= Mission: Impossible season 3 =

Mission: Impossible
- Season 3
- No. of episodes: 25

Release
- Original network: CBS
- Original release: September 29, 1968 – April 20, 1969

Season chronology
- ← Previous; Season 2 Next → Season 4

The third season of the original Mission: Impossible originally aired Sundays at 10:00–11:00 pm (EST) on CBS from September 29, 1968 to April 20, 1969.

== Cast ==
Character	Actor	Main	Recurring
Jim Phelps	Peter Graves	Entire season	
Rollin Hand	Martin Landau	Entire Season	
Cinnamon Carter	Barbara Bain	Entire Season (She did not appear in episodes 8 and 22)	
Barney Collier	Greg Morris	Entire Season (He did not appear in episode 22)	
Willy Armitage	Peter Lupus	Entire Season (He did not appear in episodes 9, 18 and 22)	

== Episodes ==
No. overall	No. in season	Title	Directed by	Written by	Original release date	Prod. code
54	1	"The Heir Apparent"	Alexander Singer	Robert E. Thompson	September 29, 1968	52
Cinnamon impersonates a lost princess to foil the planned coup of a would-be military dictator (Charles Aidman). Cinnamon Carter poses as the blind elderly Princess who apparently survived the attempt on her life.
55	2	"The Contender: Part 1"	Paul Stanley	William Read Woodfield & Allan Balter	October 6, 1968	54
Barney impersonates a boxer to prevent gangsters (Ron Randell, John Dehner) from corrupting U.S. sports. Sugar Ray Robinson guest stars as a gangster's henchman; Robert Conrad has a cameo as Barney's sparring partner. The IMF will return to the boxing ring in the seventh season episode "The Fighter" (S07/E17).
56	3	"The Contender: Part 2"	Paul Stanley	William Read Woodfield & Allan Balter	October 13, 1968	55
The conclusion of the previous episode.
57	4	"The Mercenaries"	Paul Krasny	Laurence Heath	October 27, 1968	51
The IMF travel to Africa to stop a gold-hungry mercenary (Pernell Roberts) and end his reign of terror. This is the first episode to have been produced for the third season.
58	5	"The Execution"	Alexander Singer	William Read Woodfield & Allan Balter	November 10, 1968	56
To stop a brutal racketeer (Vincent Gardenia) from controlling the U.S. grocery industry, the IMF must convince his hitman to turn state's evidence.
59	6	"The Cardinal"	Sutton Roley	John T. Dugan	November 17, 1968	58
To secure power, a general (Theodore Bikel) replaces a country's beloved cardinal (Paul Stevens) with a lookalike (also played by Paul Stevens); the team devises a plan to switch them back.
60	7	"The Elixir"	John Florea	Max Hodge	November 24, 1968	59
In South America, the IMF must prevent a vain, Evita-like matriarch (Ruth Roman) from seizing power in a coup.
61	8	"The Diplomat"	Don Richardson	Jerry Ludwig	December 1, 1968	53
The IMF must discredit an enemy diplomat (Fernando Lamas) who is supplying a foreign power with the locations of U.S. missile control centers. Cinnamon did not appear in this episode.
62	9	"The Play"	Lee H. Katzin	Lou Shaw	December 8, 1968	57
The IMF must discredit a foreign minister of culture whose influence prevents his premier from establishing a non-aggression pact with the United States. Willy did not appear in this episode. There is no dossier scene.
63	10	"The Bargain"	Richard Benedict	Robert E. Thompson	December 15, 1968	61
In Miami, the IMF must prevent a crime syndicate from funding an exiled dictator's (Albert Paulsen) plan to launch a counter-revolution. There is no dossier scene.
64	11	"The Freeze"	Alexander Singer	Paul Playdon	December 22, 1968	63
A bank robber (Donnelly Rhodes) plans to wait in prison on a lesser charge until the statute of limitations expires on his theft; the IMF must convince him to retrieve the loot early, before his double-crossed partners get wind of the con.
65	12	"The Exchange"	Alexander Singer	Laurence Heath	January 5, 1969	60
Cinnamon is captured behind the Iron Curtain, and Jim must kidnap, break, and trade an enemy agent before she breaks, bargaining with a treacherous officer (John Vernon) in the process. This is the first episode which begins in medias res, showing the IMF team in the middle of an ongoing mission before Cinnamon is captured and imprisoned.
66	13	"The Mind of Stefan Miklos"	Robert Butler	Paul Playdon	January 12, 1969	62
A double agent within U.S. intelligence is being fed false information, but his suspicious handler (Edward Asner) asks for a security check. Miklos (Steve Ihnat), an enemy mastermind, is sent to investigate and the IMF must convince him that the information is true and the handler is the traitor.
67	14	"The Test Case"	Sutton Roley	Laurence Heath	January 19, 1969	64
A "hired gun" bacteriologist (David Hurst) is developing a deadly but short-lived virus for the Warsaw Pact; the IMF must eliminate him and his virus.
68	15	"The System"	Robert Gist	Robert Hamner	January 26, 1969	65
When a crime boss escapes justice the IMF must trick an underling (James Patterson) operating a crooked casino into turning state's evidence. This episode was remade as the second episode in the revival series.
69	16	"The Glass Cage"	John Moxey	S : Alf Harris; T : Paul Playdon	February 2, 1969	66
Barney and Willy get arrested in an Eastern Bloc nation to fake the escape of a resistance leader, who is in an escape-proof cell. Larry Linville guest stars.
70	17	"Doomsday"	John Moxey	Laurence Heath	February 16, 1969	68
When a nearly bankrupt European industrialist (Alf Kjellin) tries to recover his fortune by selling a nuclear bomb to the highest bidder, the IMF must keep the weapon out of the hands of third-world nations.
71	18	"Live Bait"	Stuart Hagmann	T : James D. Buchanan & Ronald Austin; S/T : Michael Adams	February 23, 1969	67
An enemy internal security chief (Anthony Zerbe) uses his own assistant (Martin Sheen) in the hope of out-foxing the IMF and exposing a high-ranking American agent. Willy did not appear in this episode.
72	19	"The Bunker: Part 1"	John Moxey	Paul Playdon	March 2, 1969	69
Imprisoned underground in an Eastern European nation, a brilliant scientist is being forced to develop a deadly missile.
73	20	"The Bunker: Part 2"	John Moxey	Paul Playdon	March 9, 1969	70
In the conclusion of the previous episode, the IMF must rescue the scientist (Milton Selzer) and his wife (Lee Meriwether) before another nation's master of disguise can assassinate him.
74	21	"Nitro"	Bruce Kessler	Laurence Heath	March 23, 1969	71
A near-eastern ultra-nationalist assigns a demolitions expert (Mark Lenard) to kill his nation's leadership so a peace treaty can be replaced with a declaration of war. The IMF must act in time.
75	22	"Nicole"	Stuart Hagmann	Paul Playdon	March 30, 1969	73
Jim, shot and captured during exfiltration, is joined by an attractive double agent (Joan Collins) – but whose side is she really on? (Unusual for a non-season 1 episode, only two regular IMF members – Jim and Rollin – appear.) Neither Cinnamon nor Barney nor Willy appear in this episode.
76	23	"The Vault"	Richard Benedict	S : John Kingsbridge; S/T : Judy Burns	April 6, 1969	72
Coup plotters (Nehemiah Persoff, Jerry Riggio) have looted a treasury to unseat a South American president (Rodolfo Acosta).
77	24	"Illusion"	Gerald Mayer	Laurence Heath	April 13, 1969	74
The IMF must eliminate two of the three contenders for chief of secret police in an eastern European nation.
78	25	"The Interrogator"	Reza S. Badiyi	Paul Playdon	April 20, 1969	75
An enemy officer (Henry Silva) knows a deadly secret, but is under interrogation in another hostile nation. This is the final episode to feature Martin Landau as Rollin Hand and Barbara Bain as Cinnamon Carter.
