= Mission: Impossible season 6 =

Mission: Impossible
- Season 6
- No. of episodes: 22

Release
- Original network: CBS
- Original release: September 18, 1971 – February 26, 1972

Season chronology
- ← Previous; Season 5 Next → Season 7

The sixth season of the original Mission: Impossible originally aired Saturdays at 10:00–11:00 pm (EST) on CBS from September 18, 1971 to February 26, 1972.

== Cast ==
Character	Actor	Main	Recurring
Jim Phelps	Peter Graves	Entire season	
Barney Collier	Greg Morris	Entire Season	
Casey	Lynda Day George	Entire Season	
Willy Armitage	Peter Lupus	Entire Season	
Dr. Doug Robert	Sam Elliott		Episode 2

== Episodes ==
No. overall	No. in season	Title	Directed by	Written by	Original release date	Prod. code
128	1	"Blind"	Reza S. Badiyi	Arthur Weiss	September 18, 1971	126
Lynda Day George joins the regular cast as Casey. Jim undergoes surgery to be temporarily blinded in order to pose as an ex-federal investigator [who had been caught in an explosion caused by the Syndicate at an industrial facility] to protect an undercover officer in the Syndicate from being exposed by a Syndicate rival. Guest stars:Harold J. Stone; Tom Bosley; Jason Evers
129	2	"Encore"	Paul Krasny	Harold Livingston	September 25, 1971	125
To bring down a pair of crime syndicate bosses by finding evidence of a murder committed by them years before, the IMF must convince one of them (William Shatner) that he has travelled back in time to his youth in 1937. Final appearance of Sam Elliott as Doug. Third of three episodes starring both Sam Elliott and Peter Lupus. This is the first episode to have been produced for the sixth season.
130	3	"The Tram"	Paul Krasny	S : Paul Playdon; T : James L. Henderson & Samuel Roeca	October 2, 1971	131
The IMF must infiltrate a Syndicate financial meeting – held at a mountain resort only accessible by aerial tramway – to discover the group's Swiss bank account number.
131	4	"Mindbend"	Marvin Chomsky	James D. Buchanan & Ronald Austin	October 9, 1971	130
A Syndicate boss has been using a psychopathic doctor to brainwash former prison inmates to assassinate public officials and then kill themselves immediately after, and Barney must go undercover and resist the doctor's "training" to expose them.
132	5	"Shape-Up"	Paul Krasny	Ed Adamson and Norman Katkov	October 16, 1971	133
The IMF has to break the Syndicate control over a waterfront and its docks by making the local boss believe a ship is haunted by the ghost of a man he killed.
133	6	"The Miracle"	Leonard J. Horn	Dan Ullman	October 23, 1971	129
The IMF makes a Syndicate drug smuggler (Joe Don Baker) believe he has received the heart of a priest in a transplant operation, faked for the benefit of him and his associate (Billy Dee Williams), and that he is taking on the donor's personality traits in order to intercept a large heroin shipment.
134	7	"Encounter"	Barry Crane	Howard Berk	October 30, 1971	132
In order to put two Syndicate operators out of commission, Casey disguises herself as the alcoholic wife (Elizabeth Ashley) of one of the operators and fakes a Syndicate plot to murder her so as to convince the two operators that each is double-crossing the other.
135	8	"Underwater"	Sutton Roley	Arthur Weiss	November 6, 1971	134
When an underling steals a shipment of diamonds out from under the nose of a Syndicate fence (Fritz Weaver) and hides them underwater offshore, Casey makes the fence and the underling believe SCUBA diver Jim has already found them in order to retrieve the gems and the $75 million earmarked for their sale.
136	9	"Invasion"	Leslie H. Martinson	James L. Henderson & Samuel Roeca	November 13, 1971	137
After a murderous East European People's Republic enemy agent (Kevin McCarthy) steals the secrets of the US Distant Early Warning (DEW) system against nuclear missile strikes, he is made to believe the United States has been invaded by the country he's spying for in order to retrieve the document and uncover the identity of his "control" who knows where the copy of DEW microfilm plans are hidden; in a twist ending neither the agent or the IMF know is that the "control" has ordered a hitman to kill the agent. Trivia: The IMF vs the East European People's Republic had clashed before in the episode "The Party". Similar to 1/3 "Operation Rogosh"
137	10	"Blues"	Reza S. Badiyi	S : Orville H. Hampton; S/T : Howard Berk	November 20, 1971	139
Posing as an aspiring singer, Barney makes a Syndicate record executive (William Windom) believe he has an audio recording of the night the executive threw a woman off a balcony.
138	11	"The Visitors"	Reza S. Badiyi	Harold Livingston	November 27, 1971	135
A wealthy media tycoon (Steve Forrest), secretly controlled by the Syndicate, has one of his own reporters murdered when the man gets too close to the truth; Jim and Casey make the tycoon believe they are extraterrestrials with the secret to eternal life in order for the tycoon to publicly expose corrupt candidates in an upcoming election.
139	12	"Nerves"	Barry Crane	T : Garrie Bateson; S/T : Henry Sharp	December 4, 1971	140
When a paranoid Syndicate enforcer (Christopher George, Lynda Day George's husband) threatens to release deadly nerve gas in a heavily populated area to force the release of his brother from prison, the IMF must recover the defective gas canister before it leaks and kills thousands. Guest starring Tyne Daly as the enforcer's girlfriend and Rafer Johnson as his partner.
140	13	"Run for the Money"	Marvin Chomsky	Edward J. Lakso	December 11, 1971	128
To bring down a Syndicate man running illegal parimutuel betting parlors and stop the saboteur blowing up their competition, the IMF pits the two men against each other by making the saboteur believe he's buying a stolen and disguised super-horse.
141	14	"The Connection"	Barry Crane	T : Ken Pettus; S/T : Edward J. Lakso	December 18, 1971	136
In order to take down the largest supplier of uncut heroin on the eastern seaboard (Anthony Zerbe) and uncover both his opium source and his US distributor, the IMF makes him believe an island off the coast of Georgia is really off the coast of Africa. Guest star Joe Maross
142	15	"The Bride"	John Llewellyn Moxey	Jackson Gillis	January 1, 1972	127
Casey poses as the Irish mail-order bride of a Syndicate boss (James Gregory) in order to disrupt an international money laundering ring.
143	16	"Stone Pillow"	Leslie H. Martinson	Howard Browne	January 8, 1972	142
In order to discover the location of film negatives an inmate (Bradford Dillman) is using to blackmail a Syndicate boss, cellmate Jim must bust the inmate out of prison for real.
144	17	"Image"	Don McDougall	Samuel Roeca & James L. Henderson	January 15, 1972	138
When a Syndicate boss threatens to flee the country to avoid prosecution and take a secret list of corrupt officials with him, tarot reader Barney convinces him he has a heretofore unknown (and separated) conjoined twin to get him to divulge the list's location.
145	18	"Committed"	Reza S. Badiyi	S : Laurence Heath; T : Arthur Weiss	January 22, 1972	141
Casey gets herself committed to a prison-like mental hospital in order to save the only witness in a murder trial against a Syndicate boss from being driven insane by the corrupt staff.
146	19	"Bag Woman"	Paul Krasny	Ed Adamson and Norman Katkov	January 29, 1972	144
When a government agent is killed by a Syndicate hitman (George Stanford Brown), Barney impersonates him; however after Barney's cover is accidentally blown during an operation to discover the identity of a West coast politician demanding "protection" bribes from the Syndicate, the rest of the team races to warn bag woman Casey that the satchel she's carrying is actually a bomb.
147	20	"Double Dead"	Barry Crane	T : Laurence Heath; S/T : Jackson Gillis	February 12, 1972	143
When Willy is captured stealing the $10 million bankroll of a pair of Syndicate loan sharks (Lou Antonio, Paul Koslo), the rest of the IMF must not only turn the loan sharks against each other in order to get the money, but also rescue Willy before a Syndicate doctor can break him using a truth serum. There is no apartment scene.
148	21	"Casino"	Reza S. Badiyi	Walter Brough and Howard Berk	February 19, 1972	145
To take down a Syndicate casino owner (Jack Cassidy), the IMF makes his Syndicate bosses believe he's planning to rob his own vault and flee with the money to the Caribbean. The owner ends up with the stolen money; given a choice of going on a one way ride with his boss or testifying before state legislate on organized crime and gambling-the owner decides to testify. The seventh season episode "Kidnap" (S07/E11) refers to this episode.
149	22	"Trapped"	Leslie H. Martinson	S : Rick Husky; T : Samuel Roeca & James L. Henderson	February 26, 1972	146
To recover $8 million stolen during an Army payroll heist in Southeast Asia and nab a smuggling family, the IMF convinces one brother (Bert Convy) that the other brother (Jon Cypher) is trying to have him killed. However, after Jim is shot during the mission, he develops amnesia.
