= Mission: Impossible season 4 =

Mission: Impossible
- Season 4
- No. of episodes: 26

Release
- Original network: CBS
- Original release: September 28, 1969 – March 29, 1970

Season chronology
- ← Previous; Season 3 Next → Season 5

The fourth season of the original Mission: Impossible originally aired Sundays at 10:00–11:00 pm (EST) on CBS from September 28, 1969 to March 29, 1970.

== Cast ==
Character	Actor	Main	Recurring
Jim Phelps	Peter Graves	Entire season	
Paris	Leonard Nimoy	Entire Season	
Barney Collier	Greg Morris	Entire Season	
Willy Armitage	Peter Lupus	Entire Season (He did not appear in episode 21)	
Tracey	Lee Meriwether		Episodes 2, 7, 9, 14-16

== Episodes ==
No. overall	No. in season	Title	Directed by	Written by	Original release date	Prod. code
79	1	"The Code"	Stuart Hagmann	Ken Pettus	September 28, 1969	78
A Latin American dictator (Harold Gould) with the help of a European military "advisor" (Michael Constantine) conspire to invade a neighboring country to "unite" both countries under the dictators rule; in order to stop the invasion and shatter an alliance between two countries, the IMF team must photograph and break a code in a matter of minutes, by mounting a chosen-plaintext attack. First appearance of Leonard Nimoy as Paris.
80	2	"The Numbers Game"	Reza S. Badiyi	Leigh Vance	October 5, 1969	80
The IMF team tries to get a deposed dictator to divulge his Swiss bank account number by making him believe World War III is about to begin. This is the first appearance of Lee Meriwether as Tracey.
81	3	"The Controllers: Part 1"	Paul Krasny	Laurence Heath	October 12, 1969	76
Jim and a female agent (played by Dina Merrill) pose as scientists who claim to have invented a new, more efficient drug which turns people into willing slaves. Their objective is to replace the real drug with a placebo. This is the first episode to have been produced for the fourth season.
82	4	"The Controllers: Part 2"	Paul Krasny	Laurence Heath	October 19, 1969	77
The Team are forced to change tactics when one of their targets is killed upsetting the plan. This is the last two-part episode in the series.
83	5	"Fool's Gold"	Murray Golden	Ken Pettus	October 26, 1969	83
Paris poses as a counterfeiter in order to get access to and destroy a safe containing 100 million drona worth of counterfeit money as well as the plates used to make it. If the counterfeit money is released then that nation's gold reserves will be depleted and the pro-Western government will be overthrown in a revolution. The main challenge when entering the vault is to overcome the vault's ultrasonic defenses. This episode guest-starred Nehemiah Persoff as Minister Stravos and Sally Ann Howes as the female agent for the mission, Beth.
84	6	"Commandante"	Barry Crane	Laurence Heath	November 2, 1969	81
Jim and Willy pose as U. S. religious workers who are willing to trade guns in exchange for the life of an imprisoned priest who is about to be executed. The episode guest-starred Lawrence Dane as Commandante Juan Acero, Arthur Batanides as the priest, and Sid Haig as a major.
85	7	"Submarine"	Paul Krasny	Donald James	November 16, 1969	85
A fanatic ex-SS officer (Stephen McNally) plans to fund neo-Nazis with stolen money upon his release after serving 25 years as a prisoner. The IMF team simulates a submarine journey to trick him into divulging his Swiss bank account number. Ramon Bieri as Colonel Sandor.
86	8	"Mastermind"	Georg Fenady	S : Richard Neil Morgan; S/T : Jerry Ludwig	November 23, 1969	79
Paris convinces a mob figure (Donnelly Rhodes) that he can read the mind of his double-crossing boss, while Barney attempts to steal an incriminating file from the boss's safe.
87	9	"Robot"	Reza S. Badiyi	Howard Berk	November 30, 1969	82
A country is unaware that its premier is long dead and has been replaced by a double (both played by Leonard Nimoy) who is about to name a successor.
88	10	"The Double Circle"	Barry Crane	Jerry Ludwig	December 7, 1969	84
An art lover (James Patterson) is made to believe he can own a priceless Buddha statue. In the meantime the IMF team tries to retrieve a formula by breaking into his impenetrable safe.
89	11	"The Brothers"	Murray Golden	S : Robert C. Dennis; T : Leigh Vance	December 14, 1969	86
A Middle Eastern king (Lloyd Battista) needs to be restored to the throne, so the IMF team simulates a kidney transplantation during which he seemingly will donate his kidney to his murderous brother (also played by Lloyd Battista). A complication arises during the "operation" when supporters of the evil brother try to sabotage the operations and kill both brothers. In the end Colonel Hatafis (Joseph Ruskin), a supporter of the evil brother, accidentally kills him thinking he is the deposed brother.
90	12	"Time Bomb"	Murray Golden	Paul Playdon	December 21, 1969	90
The IMF team must stop a terminally ill renegade Allied agent from detonating an atomic bomb in an enemy capital.
91	13	"The Amnesiac"	Reza S. Badiyi	T : Ken Pettus; S/T : Robert Malcolm Young	December 28, 1969	91
A stolen isotope could make atomic weapons affordable to every country in the world. Paris poses as an amnesia victim to retrieve the stolen isotope.
92	14	"The Falcon: Part 1"	Reza S. Badiyi	Paul Playdon	January 4, 1970	87
The IMF team must stop an arranged wedding between the king (Noel Harrison)'s cousin Francesca (Diane Baker) and a ruthless usurper to the throne (John Vernon), and rescue the king, Francesca and the man she truly loves.
93	15	"The Falcon: Part 2"	Reza S. Badiyi	Paul Playdon	January 11, 1970	88
The wedding is halted when Francesca shoots herself dead… or does she?
94	16	"The Falcon: Part 3"	Reza S. Badiyi	Paul Playdon	January 18, 1970	89
The IMF launch the last stage of their plan, but time is running out… This is the series's only three-part episode. This is the last appearance of Lee Meriwether as Tracey.
95	17	"Chico"	Herb Wallerstein	Ken Pettus	January 25, 1970	92
The IMF team plans to use a trained dog named Chico to retrieve one of two parts of a microfilm that, when combined, reveal a list of double agents who have infiltrated a drug cartel and who are in danger of being exposed by the microfilm.
96	18	"Gitano"	Barry Crane	Laurence Heath	February 1, 1970	94
Paris, Willy and guest agent Zorka (Margarita Cordova) pose as gypsies and rescue a 12-year-old king (Barry Williams). To fool his assassins, the king has to dress up like a girl.
97	19	"Phantoms"	Marvin Chomsky	Laurence Heath	February 8, 1970	95
Using a clever projection system a dictator is made to believe that he sees the spirits of his dead victims. He must be removed from power so a political moderate can take control of the government and stop the planned purge of the nation's pro-West artist community.
98	20	"Terror"	Marvin Chomsky	Laurence Heath	February 15, 1970	93
Jim and his team must infiltrate a prison to block the release of a ruthless terrorist (Michael Tolan) who is about to be pardoned.
99	21	"Lover's Knot"	Reza S. Badiyi	Laurence Heath	February 22, 1970	96
The IMF must break a spy ring in London. Matters get complicated by the fact that Paris develops feelings for the beautiful Lady Weston, who is part of that spy ring. After that, he is cast as a jealous lover in a romantic love triangle. This episode starts Jim and the IMF team in the field getting their assignment at the U.S. Embassy in London from the State Department. Willy did not appear in this episode.
100	22	"Orpheus"	Gerald Mayer	Paul Playdon	March 1, 1970	97
The IMF team must stop an unknown assassin.
101	23	"The Crane"	Paul Krasny	Ken Pettus	March 8, 1970	99
Jim and his team rescue a prisoner and hide him at a conspicuous location right under his captors' noses. Then they use the rescue to topple the military junta that rules the nation.
102	24	"Death Squad"	Barry Crane	Laurence Heath	March 15, 1970	100
While on holiday with Jim, Barney kills a man in self-defense and is marked for execution by the dead man's brother (Pernell Roberts), a corrupt chief of police. The IMF team must rescue Barney before it is too late and expose the police chief's true colors. This episode is unusual in that there is no tape recording; instead the team goes on an "off book" mission to rescue Barney. Cicely Tyson guest-starred as Alma Ross in this episode.
103	25	"The Choice"	Allan Greedy	S : Henry Sharp; T : Ken Pettus	March 22, 1970	98
A mystic (Leonard Nimoy) plans to abuse his powerful influence over a duchess to ascend to the throne. Nimoy plays both the evil mystic and Paris disguised as the mystic at the same time.
104	26	"The Martyr"	Virgil W. Vogel	Ken Pettus	March 29, 1970	101
Paris poses as the son of a martyred youth leader in order to stop a dictator who plans to crush the youth movement of his country.
