= Mission: Impossible season 5 =

Mission: Impossible
- Season 5
- No. of episodes: 23

Release
- Original network: CBS
- Original release: September 19, 1970 – March 17, 1971

Season chronology
- ← Previous; Season 4 Next → Season 6

The fifth season of the original Mission: Impossible originally aired Saturdays at 7:30–8:30 pm (EST) from September 19, 1970 to March 6, 1971. "The Merchant" originally aired Wednesday, March 17, 1971 at 7:30–8:30 pm (EST).

== Cast ==
Character	Actor	Main	Recurring
Jim Phelps	Peter Graves	Entire season	
Paris	Leonard Nimoy	Entire Season	
Dana Lambert	Lesley Ann Warren	Entire Season	
Barney Collier	Greg Morris	Entire Season	
Willy Armitage	Peter Lupus	Episodes 1-4, 7-8, 12, 15-16, 18, 21-23	
Dr. Doug Robert	Sam Elliott	Episodes 5-6, 9-11, 13-14, 17, 19-20	Episodes 3, 22

== Episodes ==
No. overall	No. in season	Title	Directed by	Written by	Original release date	Prod. code
105	1	"The Killer"	Paul Krasny	Arthur Weiss	September 19, 1970	105
Lesley Ann Warren joins the regular cast as Dana Lambert. The IMF must stop a contract assassin (Robert Conrad) who makes all his decisions based on random chance. This episode was remade as the first episode of the revival series.
106	2	"Flip Side"	John Llewellyn Moxey	Jackson Gillis	September 26, 1970	106
The IMF must bust an illegal pharmaceutical ring where a US manufacturer (Dana Elcar) sells – legally – to a Mexican businessman (Robert Alda), who then smuggles the product back across the border to a west-coast distributor (Sal Mineo).
107	3	"The Innocent"	John Llewellyn Moxey	T : Laurence Heath; S/T : Marc Norman	October 3, 1970	108
First appearance of Sam Elliott as recurring IMF team member Doug. When Barney is accidentally poisoned and subsequently caught during an attempt to destroy a computer, the IMF must persuade the only person in the area who can fill in for Barney to do the job – except he's reluctant to help and threatens to turn the team in. First of three episodes starring both Sam Elliott and Peter Lupus. Larry Linville makes an appearance as a foreign colonel.
108	4	"Homecoming"	Reza S. Badiyi	Laurence Heath	October 10, 1970	103
Jim Phelps discovers a series of murders going on in his hometown, and he brings in the rest of the IMF team to help him get to the bottom of it. Loretta Swit, Jacqueline Scott guest star.
109	5	"Flight"	Barry Crane	S : Leigh Vance; T : Harold Livingston	October 17, 1970	110
In order to foil an assassination, the IMF must convince the only man (John Colicos) who knows the identity of the assassin that his plane has crash-landed onto a notorious penal colony.
110	6	"My Friend, My Enemy"	Gerald Mayer	S : William Wood; S/T : Gene R. Kearney	October 24, 1970	107
While motorcycling in Europe, Paris is recognized by enemy agents, kidnapped, and brainwashed to murder his "control" – Jim Phelps.
111	7	"Butterfly"	Gerald Mayer	S : Sheldon Stark; T : Eric Bercovici and Jerry Ludwig	October 31, 1970	102
Paris must impersonate a kabuki artist and Willy must fight a jujitsu master in order to expose the murder of the Japanese wife (Lisa Lu) of an American businessman (Russ Conway) by her wealthy isolationist brother (Khigh Dhiegh). James Shigeta guest stars. This is the first episode to have been produced for the fifth season.
112	8	"Decoy"	Seymour Robbie	John D. F. Black	November 7, 1970	109
The IMF must spirit the daughter of the late premier of an Eastern-bloc country – and the secret dossier he gave her – to the West out from under the nose of her brother (Paul Stevens) and the country's security chief (Michael Strong), who knows of her desire to defect and wants the secret document, a list of moderate pro-Western officials.
113	9	"The Amateur"	Paul Krasny	Ed Adamson	November 14, 1970	112
While the IMF smuggles a secret weapon out of an Eastern-bloc country, they must contend with the meddling of a nightclub owner (Anthony Zerbe) who is not as clever as he thinks he is.
114	10	"Hunted"	Terry Becker	Helen Hoblock Thompson	November 21, 1970	111
While attempting to smuggle the ill leader of a black nationalist movement from the clutches of his country's murderous white settler minority, Barney is wounded by the secret police and forced to seek refuge with a deaf-mute seamstress. Can the IMF find Barney before the secret police do?
115	11	"The Rebel"	Barry Crane	S : Norman Katkov; S/T : Ken Pettus	November 28, 1970	104
After a scientist is executed, the IMF must discover the location of his notebook in order to keep it out of the hands of the military, led by a scheming colonel (Mark Lenard).
116	12	"Squeeze Play"	Virgil W. Vogel	S : Walter Brough; S/T : David Moessinger	December 12, 1970	114
Paris impersonates an American mobster in order to infiltrate the Syndicate's Mediterranean branch, obtain the list of their opium suppliers, and prevent the branch's terminally ill boss (Albert Paulsen) from perpetuating his empire.
117	13	"The Hostage"	Barry Crane	Harold Livingston	December 19, 1970	117
At the conclusion of a successful mission in a Latin country, revolutionaries kidnap Paris, believing he actually is the successful American hotel magnate that he had been portraying.
118	14	"Takeover"	Virgil W. Vogel	S : Jerry Thomas; S/T : Arthur Weiss	January 2, 1971	118
A youth organizer is hired by a political boss and his puppet mayor (Lloyd Bochner) to foment student violence in order to make their political opponents appear weak. Dana poses as a provocateur (who is the mayor's long-lost daughter) to disrupt their plans.
119	15	"Cat's Paw"	Virgil W. Vogel	Howard Browne	January 9, 1971	116
The IMF helps Barney avenge the murder of his older brother by the black Mob.
120	16	"The Missile"	Charles R. Rondeau	Arthur Weiss	January 16, 1971	119
An enemy agent (David Sheiner) attempts to steal the guidance system and schematics for a top-secret missile, but the IMF has secretly switched them out for fakes in order to set enemy weapons research back. Unfortunately, the team must also contend with a psychotic mechanic (John Beck) who is convinced that Dana Lambert is his former girlfriend.
121	17	"The Field"	Reza S. Badiyi	S : Judy Burns; S/T : Wesley Lau	January 23, 1971	121
In order to help Barney cross an enemy minefield and destroy a nuclear satellite, Paris impersonates the American defector who designed the minefield. But when the real defector is accused of murder, the enemy forces take Paris into custody and reactivate the mines, with Barney trapped inside the field.
122	18	"Blast"	Sutton Roley	James L. Henderson & Samuel Roeca	January 30, 1971	122
Jim and Dana infiltrate a crew of bank robbers in order to discover the identity of the mysterious man they're funding, who aims to eventually overthrow the US government.
123	19	"The Catafalque"	Barry Crane	Paul Playdon	February 6, 1971	113
To discover the hidden location of a secret nuclear treaty and avoid a Cuban-style missile crisis, the IMF team must convince the son (John Vernon) of the country's deceased former leader that the new leader is framing him for murder.
124	20	"Kitara"	Murray Golden	Mann Rubin	February 20, 1971	120
In order to rescue a renowned resistance leader imprisoned in an African colony governed by apartheid, the IMF utilize drugs and a special light bulb to trick a white governor (Lawrence Dobkin) into believing that his race has been altered.
125	21	"A Ghost Story"	Reza S. Badiyi	S : John D. F. Black; T : Ken Pettus; S/T : Ed Adamson	February 27, 1971	123
A fascist militia leader (Andrew Duggan) must be made to believe that he is seeing and hearing ghosts in order to find where he has hidden the corpse of his son, which contains the only remaining clues to the secret of a deadly nerve gas. There is a twist ending where the presumed-to-have-died son whose name is Howard (Frank Farmer) is revealed to be alive.
126	22	"The Party"	Murray Golden	Harold Livingston	March 6, 1971	124
A US imprisoned Spymaster Colonel (Frank Marth) of the East European People's Republic gave his wife a code representing the location of the list of his government's spies in the US, then hypnotized himself to forget the list and its location, with the wife serving as the only trigger. In order to get the list, the IMF throws a fake party for the couple at the real embassy of the EEPR. Second of three episodes starring both Sam Elliott and Peter Lupus. This is the last episode to have been produced for the fifth season.
127	23	"The Merchant"	Leon Benson	Harold Livingston	March 17, 1971	115
Final appearances of Leonard Nimoy as Paris and Lesley Ann Warren as Dana Lambert. The IMF uses a rigged card game in order to bankrupt an illegal arms dealer (George Sanders). But when the computer the team was using is sabotaged, Paris must beat the arms dealer at five-card stud poker without any help.
