= Mission: Impossible season 7 =

Mission: Impossible
- Season 7
- No. of episodes: 22

Release
- Original network: CBS
- Original release: September 16, 1972 – March 30, 1973

Season chronology
- ← Previous; Season 6

The seventh and final season of the original Mission: Impossible originally aired Saturdays at 10:00–11:00 pm (EST) on CBS from September 16 to December 9, 1972 and Fridays at 8:00–9:00 pm (EST) from December 22, 1972 to March 30, 1973.

== Cast ==
Character	Actor	Main	Recurring
Jim Phelps	Peter Graves	Entire season	
Barney Collier	Greg Morris	Entire season	
Casey	Lynda Day George	Entire season (She did not appear in episodes 1, 3, 5, 6, 8, 9, 10, 12, 16 and 22)	
Willy Armitage	Peter Lupus	Entire season	
Mimi Davis	Barbara Anderson		Episodes 1, 3, 5, 6, 8, 9 and 10

== Episodes ==
No. overall	No. in season	Title	Directed by	Written by	Original release date	Prod. code
150	1	"Break!"	Paul Krasny	Samuel Roeca & James L. Henderson	September 16, 1972	151
In New Orleans, Jim Phelps poses as a pool shark in order to locate microfilm in a (murdered) undercover agent's wristwatch; Phelps tricks a Syndicate enforcer into becoming trapped between two crime bosses who each put a "hit contract" on him. Robert Conrad guest stars. This is the first of seven episodes in which Barbara Anderson starred as Mimi Davis, who replaced Casey while actress Lynda Day George was on maternity leave. Casey is explained to be on assignment in Europe and thus she did not appear in this episode.
151	2	"Two Thousand"	Leslie H. Martinson	Harold Livingston	September 23, 1972	148
A nuclear physicist (Vic Morrow) who stole 50 kg of plutonium to sell to foreign interests is made to believe that the United States was leveled by a nuclear holocaust, that he has been catatonic for 28 years, and that the surviving remnants of the US government plan to execute him. In a comic relief twist ending. a banker acting for the Syndicate eavesdrops on the IMF radio transmissions in order to "hijack" the plutonium, only to be involved in a gunfight with the Foreign Buyer and his henchmen; in the nick of time the IMF team arrests the buyer and his henchmen. The physicist realizes that he has been tricked and has an emotional breakdown before being arrested. Guest stars include David White and Mort Mills. This episode is similar to the episodes "Operation Rogosh" and "Invasion".
152	3	"The Deal"	Leslie H. Martinson	T : Stephen Kandel; S/T : George F. Slavin	September 30, 1972	152
The IMF must find the key to a safety deposit box containing $5 million, which is earmarked to buy the Syndicate's way into a country's takeover. Casey did not appear in this episode.
153	4	"Leona"	Leslie H. Martinson	Howard Browne	October 7, 1972	150
To rescue an undercover federal agent whose cover was blown, the IMF turns two mobsters (Dewey Martin, Robert Goulet) against one another by making one of them think he is seeing visions of his dead wife.
154	5	"TOD-5"	Lewis Allen	James D. Buchanan & Ronald Austin	October 14, 1972	155
In order to recover a stolen bioweapon canister and ferret out a diabolical scientist's (Ray Walston) terrorist organization, the IMF makes the organization's courier believe he has been infected himself. Casey did not appear in this episode.
155	6	"Cocaine"	Reza S. Badiyi	S : Norman Katkov; S/T : Harold Livingston	October 21, 1972	156
In order to find out the drop location of the largest cocaine shipment ever to come to the United States, the IMF sets up an assistant (William Shatner) of a drug kingpin (Stephen McNally) with what the assistant thinks is an opportunity to undercut him for a bigger payoff. Casey did not appear in this episode.
156	7	"Underground"	David Lowell Rich	Leigh Vance	October 28, 1972	149
In order to locate $27 million of Syndicate money, the IMF must take down a human smuggling ring which purports to smuggle criminals out of the country but, in reality, brainwashes them to give up the location of their stolen money and then disposes of them. This was the final episode of the original series to be scored by Lalo Schifrin.
157	8	"Movie"	Terry Becker	T : Arthur Weiss and Stephen Kandel; S/T : Anthony Bowers	November 4, 1972	159
Barney poses as a director making a film about an unsolved murder committed by a Syndicate money man (John Vernon) in order to get hold of Syndicate financial records. Casey did not appear in this episode.
158	9	"Hit"	Reza S. Badiyi	Douglas Weir	November 11, 1972	158
The IMF plans to remove the remaining allies of an incarcerated Syndicate chief (Dane Clark) in order to obtain both the proof of his guilt in an unsolved murder and the identity of his secret partner known only as "The General". Robert Reed guest stars as a corrupt assistant DA. Casey did not appear in this episode.
159	10	"Ultimatum"	Barry Crane	S : Shirl Hendryx; S/T : Harold Livingston	November 18, 1972	160
The IMF has less than one day to locate and disarm a hydrogen bomb planted somewhere in the western United States by a small group led by a brilliant nuclear physicist (Murray Hamilton) demanding the resignation of named Congressmen and cabinet officials and the reversal of certain foreign policies of US Government. Casey did not appear in this episode. This is the last of seven episodes in which Barbara Anderson starred as Mimi Davis.
160	11	"Kidnap"	Peter Graves	Samuel Roeca & James L. Henderson	December 2, 1972	161
In an off-book mission, a mob boss who lost money and records as a result of the IMF operation of the sixth season episode "Casino" (season 6, episode 21) holds Jim Phelps hostage for the purpose of using the team to steal a letter from a safe deposit box that can be used to convict him of murder. This is the only sequel episode of the series.
161	12	"Crack-Up"	Sutton Roley	S : Robert & Phyllis White; S/T : Arthur Weiss	December 9, 1972	154
In order to bring down a brilliant hitman (Alex Cord), the team tricks him into believing he kills people during blackouts. Casey did not appear in this episode.
162	13	"The Puppet"	Lewis Allen	Leigh Vance	December 22, 1972	162
After the head of a criminal family is injured in a hunting accident and confined to bed, his younger brother (Roddy McDowall) wants to take control of the empire and change its policies. The IMF must determine the family's new criminal enterprise involving more than $100 million, discover the reason for the change of policy, and smash the new plan.
163	14	"Incarnate"	Barry Crane	T : Stephen Kandel; S/T : Buck Houghton	January 5, 1973	165
When the ruthless leader of a criminal gang (Kim Hunter) flees to a Caribbean island that has no extradition treaty with the U.S., the IMF uses her belief in the occult to induce her to return to the US of her own free will so she can be captured and the gold she stole can be recovered.
164	15	"Boomerang"	Leslie H. Martinson	Howard Browne	January 12, 1973	164
After a mobster's wife kills him and takes his vital criminal records into her possession, the IMF induces a false belief in her that he survived and is trying to kill her so that the records can be located and turned over to the authorities.
165	16	"The Question"	Leslie H. Martinson	Stephen Kandel	January 19, 1973	157
A top KGN assassin (Gary Lockwood) claims to be defecting, and the IMF team (which includes Elizabeth Ashley guest-starring in place of Lynda Day George) must kidnap him from the headquarters of the untrustworthy Federal Intelligence Service (FIS) in order to determine whether he's a genuine defector (or "defecting" for the purpose of feeding false intelligence). Casey did not appear in this episode.
166	17	"The Fountain"	Barry Crane	Stephen Kandel	January 26, 1973	163
After a Syndicate executive (George Maharis) steals incriminating computerized records, the IMF makes him believe he has stumbled onto a mystical society with the secret of eternal youth to gain possession of the records before his crippled arch-rival (Cameron Mitchell) does. To be convincing Casey (using elaborate makeup techniques) "ages" without the water and "dies" at age 143 years before both Syndicate bosses.
167	18	"The Fighter"	Paul Krasny	S : Orville H. Hampton; T : Stephen Kandel and Nicholas E. Baehr	February 9, 1973	167
The IMF returns to boxing to expose and destroy the criminal boxing operations of the Syndicate handled by a top operative (Joe Maross) and the crooked promoter working with him (William Windom) by tricking the latter in believing that his daughter, the lover of a top prospect, is set to be murdered by the Syndicate. The IMF was previously involved in the boxing ring in the third season, two-part episode "The Contender" (S03/E02 & S03/E03).
168	19	"Speed"	Virgil W. Vogel	Lou Shaw	February 16, 1973	147
The team is sent after a powerful drug-dealer (Claude Akins), whose motorcyclist daughter (Jenny Sullivan) is addicted to amphetamines. Partly filmed on location in San Francisco. This was the first episode produced for the seventh and final season of the original series.
169	20	"The Pendulum"	Lewis Allen	Calvin Clements Jr.	February 23, 1973	168
In order to prevent a secret terrorist organization known as "The Pendulum" from disrupting the power centers of the United States and executing a major attack on the country in a plan called "Project Nightfall," the IMF must convince a brilliant planner but ruthless member of the organization (Dean Stockwell) he is being recruited by a more powerful terrorist organization "World Resources Limited," to become the new leader of "The Pendulum". This was the last episode produced for the original series. Frank Maxwell guest stars as an Army General and his imposter.
170	21	"The Western"	Leslie H. Martinson	Arnold & Lois Peyser	March 2, 1973	166
After a brilliant thief (Ed Nelson) and his accomplice looted a country's national treasure of pre-Columbian art worth $5 million, the IMF makes the thief believe that he has precognitive visions in order to locate the art and prove his guilt. This is the last episode to feature Lynda Day George as Casey within the original series.
171	22	"Imitation"	Paul Krasny	Edward J. Lakso	March 30, 1973	153
A jewel thief (Barbara McNair) and her crew (which includes Boomer, played by Pernell Roberts) steal the crown jewels of Marnsburg, a country hostile to the US. To prevent the sale of the jewels to the Syndicate, the IMF must recover the jewels and place them in a vault of Marnsburg's consulate without any help from Marnsburg. Casey did not appear in this episode. This is the last appearance of Peter Lupus as Willy Armitage. Peter Graves, Greg Morris and Lynda Day George reprised their roles in the revival Mission: Impossible.
