= Mission: Impossible (1966 TV series) =

American television series (1966–1973)

- Genre: Spy; Action
- Created by: Bruce Geller
- Starring: Steven Hill; Martin Landau; Barbara Bain; Greg Morris; Peter Lupus; Peter Graves; Leonard Nimoy; Lee Meriwether; Lesley Ann Warren; Sam Elliott; Lynda Day George
- Theme music composer: Lalo Schifrin
- Opening theme: "Theme from Mission: Impossible"
- Country of origin: United States
- No. of seasons: 7
- No. of episodes: 171 (list of episodes)

Production
- Executive producer: Bruce Geller
- Producer: Bruce Geller; Barry Crane; Joseph Gantman; Bruce Lansbury; Stanley Kallis; Laurence Heath; Allan Balter; William Woodfield
- Running time: 50–51 minutes
- Production companies: Desilu Productions; (1966–68); (seasons 1–2); Paramount Television; (1968–73); (seasons 2–7)

Original release
- Network: CBS
- Release: September 17, 1966 – March 30, 1973

Related
- Mission: Impossible (1988–90)

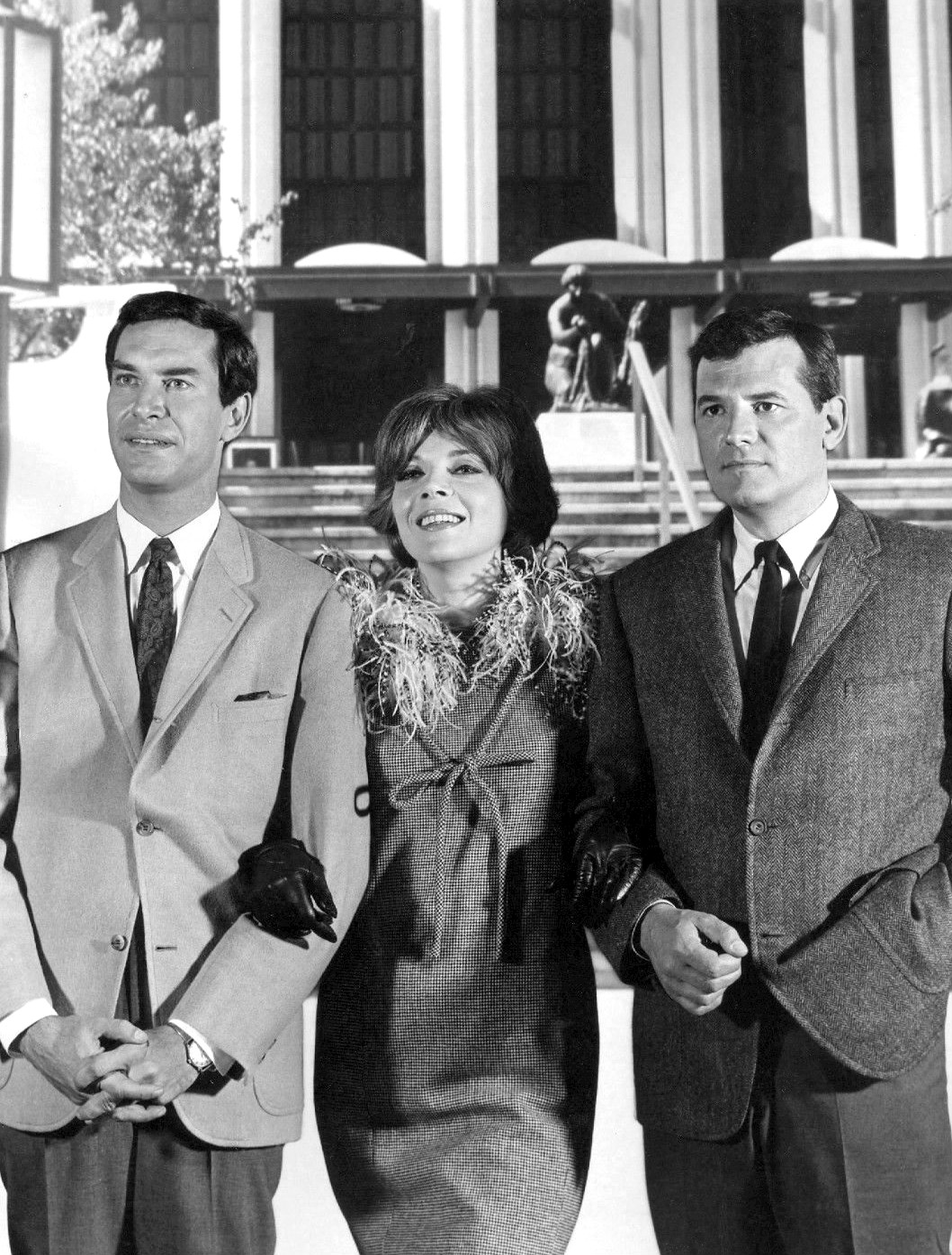
Martin Landau, Barbara Bain and Steven Hill, 1967

Mission: Impossible is an American espionage television series created by Bruce Geller, and financed and produced by Desilu Productions. It aired on CBS for seven seasons from September 17, 1966, to March 30, 1973. The series chronicled the exploits of a small team of covert government agents, known as the Impossible Missions Force, and their sophisticated methods of deceiving, manipulating and thwarting, amongst others, hostile Iron Curtain governments, third-world dictators, corrupt industrialists, and crime lords.

In the first season, the team is led by Dan Briggs (played by Steven Hill); Jim Phelps (played by Peter Graves) takes charge for the six remaining seasons. Briggs and Phelps usually assemble the same core team of agents, all of whom have careers and some degree of celebrity outside of espionage. The team is occasionally supplemented by other specialists. The series also starred Martin Landau, Barbara Bain, Greg Morris, Peter Lupus, Leonard Nimoy, Lee Meriwether, Lesley Ann Warren, and Lynda Day George.

Over the course of its initial run, Mission: Impossible won 10 Primetime Emmy Awards (including two for Outstanding Drama Series) and three Golden Globe Awards (including one for Best Television Series – Drama). It was revived in 1988 for two seasons on ABC, and later inspired the series of theatrical motion pictures starring Tom Cruise beginning in 1996.

== Premise ==
The identity of the agency that oversees the Impossible Missions Force (IMF) is never revealed. Only rare, cryptic bits of information are ever provided, such as in the third-season mission "Nicole", where the IMF leader states that his instructions come from "Division Seven". It is suggested that the IMF is an independent agency of the United States government. This is implied by the fact that, for several years, towards the end of the taped briefing messages, the narrator states: "As always, should you or any of your IM force be caught or killed, the Secretary will disavow any knowledge of your actions".

No main character was ever killed or disavowed in the original series, but a character could disappear between episodes or seasons without explanation or acknowledgment. Mimi Davis is the only character whose recruitment as an IMF agent was shown on screen, although such a scene was filmed for Dana Lambert (Lesley Ann Warren) and discarded.

== Inspiration ==
A key inspiration for Geller was the 1964 Jules Dassin film Topkapi, innovative for its methodical depiction of an elaborate heist. Geller switched the focus away from criminals, but kept Dassin's style of minimal dialogue, prominent music scoring and clockwork-precision execution by a team of diverse specialists. Several episodes show close-up shots of an agent's wristwatch to convey the suspense of working on a deadline.

Geller also insisted on minimal character development because he felt that seeing the characters as blank slates would make them more convincing in undercover work, and because he wanted to keep the focus on the caper. Geller vetoed attempts by writers to develop the main characters. Even after Geller was removed from the show, the agents were rarely if ever seen in their "real" lives, and had only one scene where they interacted at Phelps's apartment.

The producers of Mission: Impossible were sued for plagiarism by the creators of a short-lived NBC show called 21 Beacon Street. The suit was settled out of court. Geller claimed never to have seen the earlier show; 21 Beacon Street's story editor and pilot scripter, Laurence Heath, later wrote several episodes of Mission: Impossible.

Writer William Read Woodfield was a fan of David Maurer's nonfiction 1940 book about con artists, The Big Con (also an unofficial inspiration for The Sting), and many episodes are strikingly similar to cons described in the book.

The tape scene is very similar to one described in the 1964 Nick Carter-Killmaster novel Saigon, published in December 1964 and repeated in the 1966 novel Danger Key (copyright registered in February 1966). In the novels, secret agent Carter receives a package from his superior which, when activated, plays a tape-recorded message that self-destructs after playing once.

=== IMF agents ===
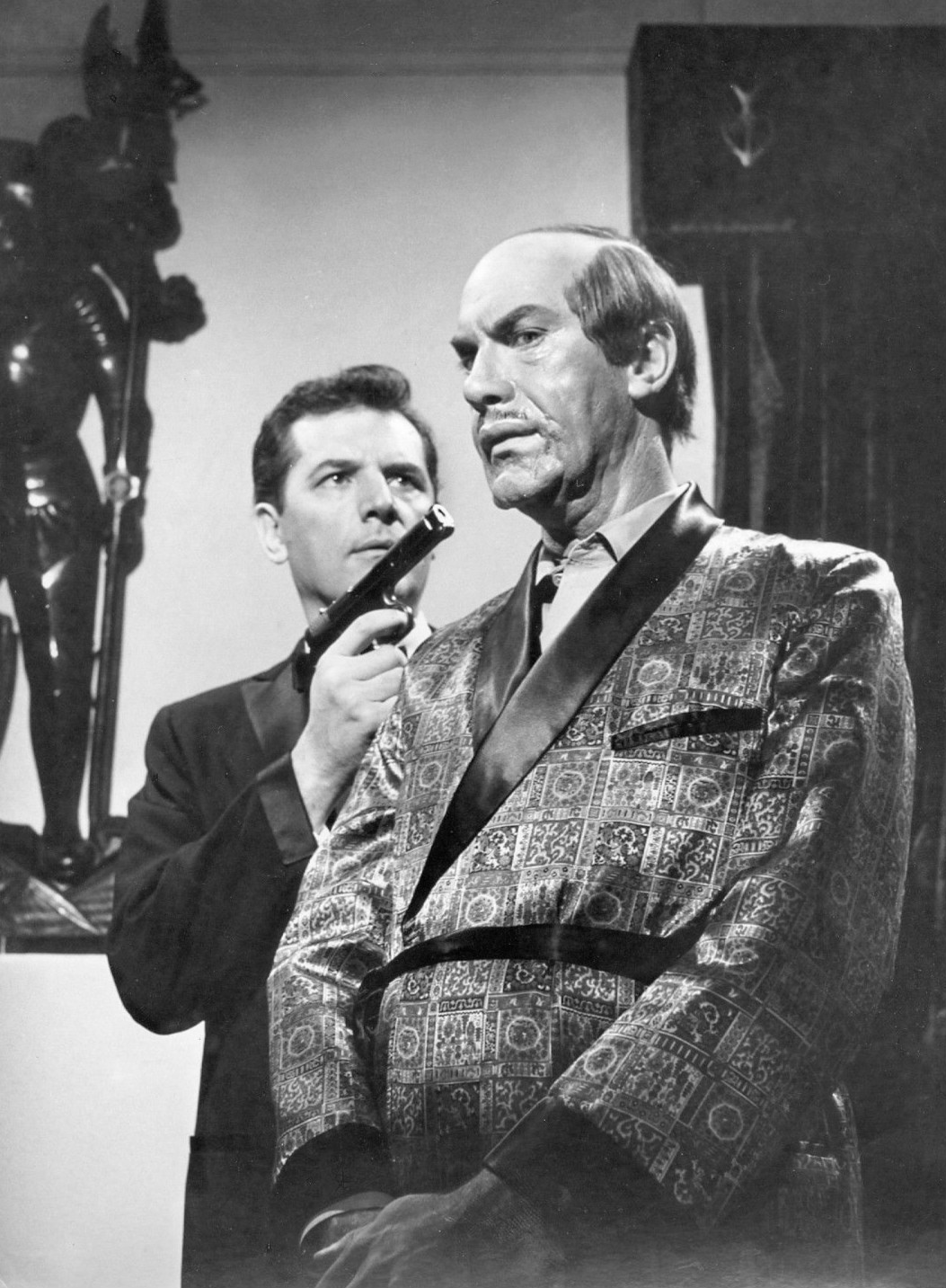
Steven Hill and Martin Landau in the pilot episode

The IMF was initially led by Dan Briggs, played by Steven Hill. As an Orthodox Jew, Hill had to leave on Fridays at 4 p.m. to be home before sundown, and he was not available until after dark the next day. Although Hill's contract allowed for religious observances, the clause proved difficult to work around due to the production schedule, and as the season progressed, Briggs appeared less and less. Hill had other problems, as well. After cooperatively crawling through dirt tunnels and repeatedly climbing a rope ladder in the episode "Snowball in Hell", in the following episode ("Action!") he balked at climbing to the rafters via a 20-foot (6.1 m) sound stage staircase and locked himself in his dressing room. Unable to come to terms with Hill, the producers re-shot the episode without him (guest cast member billed as 'co-starring' Tom Troupe as IMF Operative 'David Day' instead took the role envisaged for Briggs in the episode climbing the staircase etc.); another member of the team, Cinnamon Carter, listened to the taped message; the selected operatives' photos were displayed in "limbo"; and the team meeting was held in a different apartment. Briggs's presence in the five remaining episodes was kept to a minimum. As far as Hill's religious requirements were concerned, line producer Joseph Gantman simply had not understood what had been agreed to. He told author Patrick J. White, "'If someone understands your problems and says he understands them, you feel better about it. But if he doesn't care about your problems, then you begin to really resent him. Steven Hill may have felt exactly the same way."

Hill was replaced without an official explanation in the second season by Peter Graves (brother of Gunsmoke's James Arness), in the role of Jim Phelps. Phelps remained the team's leader for the remainder of the original series as well as the 1988–1990 revival.

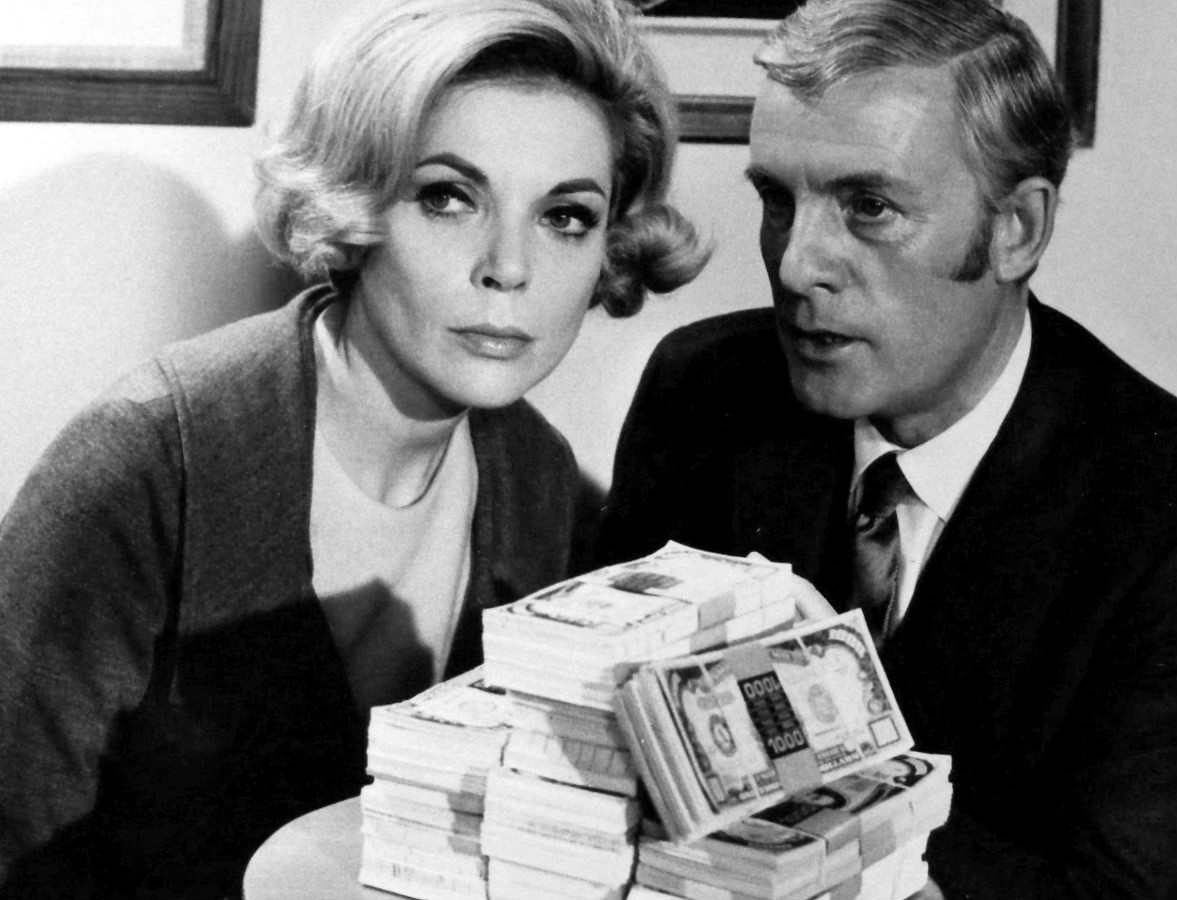
Barbara Bain as Cinnamon Carter with Alf Kjellin, 1969

In theory, Briggs and Phelps are the only full-time members of the IMF. As the series was originally conceived, they would form teams composed of part-time agents from a variety of professions based on the particular skills required for the mission. In practice, however, Briggs and Phelps choose the same core group of three or four agents for every mission, occasionally supplemented by guest stars playing agents with unique skills.

The regular agent line-up during the first season consisted of:

- Cinnamon Carter (Barbara Bain), a top fashion model and actress
- Rollin Hand (Martin Landau), a noted actor, makeup artist, escape artist, magician, and "man of a million faces"
- Barney Collier (Greg Morris), a mechanical and electronics genius and owner of Collier Electronics
- Willy Armitage (Peter Lupus), a world record-holding weight lifter

The agents' fame in their private careers never compromised their identities during missions.

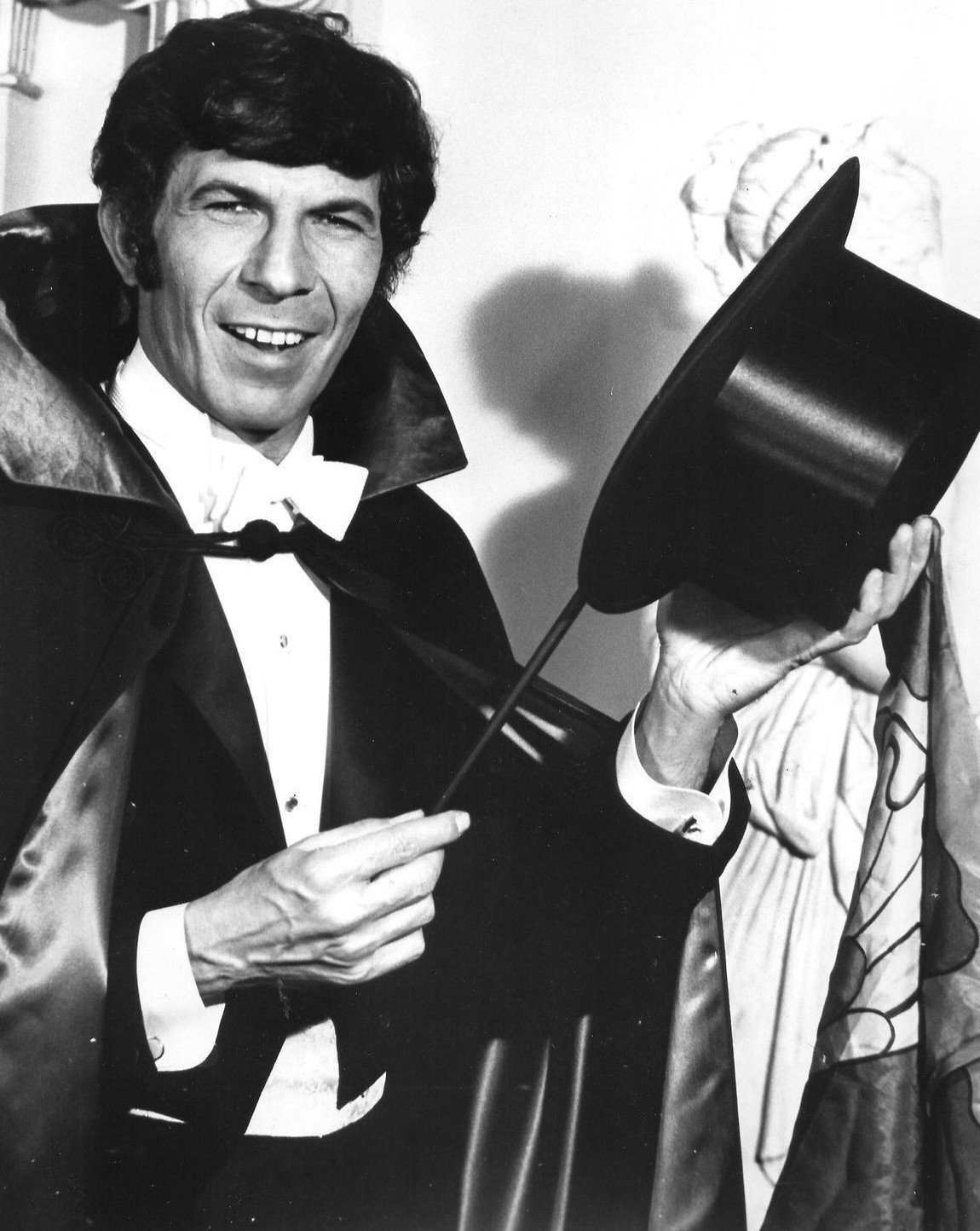
Leonard Nimoy replaced Martin Landau in seasons 4 and 5, 1969–71 (photo: 1970)

Bain and Landau were married in real life. Landau was cast as a guest star in the pilot episode with the understanding that he would be one of four or five rotating guest-star agents. His contract gave producers an option to have him "render services for (three or four) additional episodes". To fill the void left by Hill's Sabbath absences, the producers eventually struck a deal with Landau to appear in the remaining first-season episodes. He was always billed as a "guest appearance" so he had the option to give notice to work on a feature film. Landau contractually became a series regular in season two.

Bain, who won the Emmy for her performances as Cinnamon Carter three years in a row, and Landau both left the series at the conclusion of the third season. Replacements often possessed the same skills as their predecessors. For example, "The Great Paris," Rollin Hand's replacement played by Leonard Nimoy in the fourth and fifth seasons, is also an actor, makeup artist, magician, and "master of disguise". Bain was replaced in season four by a series of guest stars, only one of whom made more than one appearance: Lee Meriwether as Tracey, who appeared in six episodes. Season five added Dana Lambert, played by stage and movie actress Lesley Ann Warren (billed as "Lesley Warren"). In seasons six and seven, The Great Paris and Lambert were both replaced by cosmetologist and mistress-of-disguise Casey, whose full name was only established in the 1988–1989 revival. During her maternity leave, Casey actress Lynda Day George was replaced in a third of the season seven episodes by Mimi Davis, played by Barbara Anderson, who had been on Ironside.

Also seen in seasons five and six is Dr. Doug Robert, played by Sam Elliott. According to White, the character was introduced to add a fresh element at a time when the writers were running out of story material, but the idea was dropped once the producers realized that there was no special function that a physician could fulfill in the IMF, and as a consequence Dr. Robert consistently played little role in the stories. Most often he simply served as a surrogate for Willy Armitage, who the producers were gradually easing out of the show. After a deluge of fan mail expressed mostly negative reactions to Armitage's disappearance, however, Lupus was talked into returning.

Morris and Lupus were the only actors to remain through the entire run of the original series, although neither appeared in every episode. Morris also appeared in two episodes of the revival series, in which the character's son, Grant Collier (played by Morris's real-life son, Phil Morris), is also an IMF agent.

| Actor | Character | Seasons | | | | | | |
| Actor | Character | 1 | 2 | 3 | 4 | 5 | 6 | 7 |
|---|---|---|---|---|---|---|---|---|
| Steven Hill | Dan Briggs | Main | | | | | | |
| Barbara Bain | Cinnamon Carter | Main | Main | Main | | | | |
| Greg Morris | Barnard "Barney" Collier | Main | Main | Main | Main | Main | Main | Main |
| Peter Lupus | William "Willy" Armitage | Main | Main | Main | Main | Main | Main | Main |
| Peter Graves | Jim Phelps | | Main | Main | Main | Main | Main | Main |
| Martin Landau | Rollin Hand | Recurring | Main | Main | | | | |
| Leonard Nimoy | Paris | | | | Main | Main | | |
| Lesley Ann Warren | Dana Lambert | | | | | Main | | |
| Sam Elliott | Dr. Doug Robert | | | | | Main | | |
| Lynda Day George | Lisa Casey | | | | | | Main | Main |
| Barbara Anderson | Mimi Davis | | | | | | | Recurring |

=== Cold War subtext ===
Although a Cold War subtext is present throughout the entire series, the actual Cold War between the United States and the Soviet Union is rarely mentioned. (See, for example, the mission objectives for "The Trial" and "The Confession" in season one.) However, in the early years, specific locations behind the Iron Curtain are named (such as Lubyanka prison in the episode "Memory"), and many of the targets appear to be leaders of fictional Slavic countries, including the "European People's Republic" and the "Eastern European Republic." Additionally, real languages spoken in Eastern Europe are used. In the season-one episode "The Carriers," one of the villains reads a book whose title is the (incorrect) Russian Na Voina (About War). Police vehicles are often labeled as such with words such as "poliiçia," and "poIiia," and a gas line or tank would be labeled "Gäz," which is a Romanian translation. This "language," referred to by the production team as "Gellerese" after producer Bruce Geller, was invented specifically to be readable by non-speakers of Slavic languages, and was actually intended as a source of comic relief. Uniforms of the target regime frequently include peaked caps, jackboots, and Sam Browne belts, hinting at covert connections with Nazi Germany or the Warsaw Pact.

In 2004, Douglas Little of Clark University published a lengthy academic article explicitly linking the TV series to CIA history: "Mission Impossible: The CIA and the Cult of Covert Action in the Middle East".

=== Adversaries unrelated to the Cold War ===
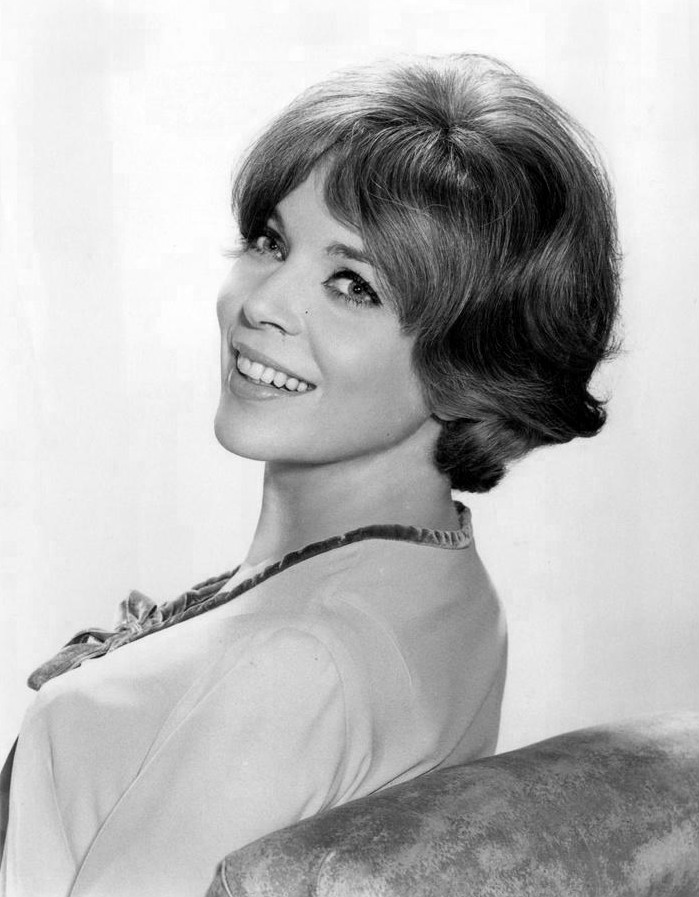
Barbara Bain series publicity photo, 1966

The IMF is also assigned to bring down politicians and dictators of Third World countries outside the Cold War. Practices such as slavery, which was still legal in some nations in 1966 ("The Slave"), and apartheid ("Kitara"), were targeted. The revival of the Nazi Party in Germany was targeted several times. Rollin Hand (played by Jewish actor Martin Landau) impersonated leading Nazi figures – Martin Bormann and Adolf Hitler. Other themes included corrupt Central or South American nations, as well as organized crime figures, corrupt businessmen, and politicians in the United States.

This mirrors actual events in the era involving the United States and regime change.

Many IMF missions were essentially assassinations in disguise. In the first-season episode "Memory", the unspecified government agency behind the IMF has forbidden it to commit outright assassinations "as a matter of policy." This policy is not consistently followed; for example in "The Legend", Briggs' original plan is to personally shoot Nazi rallying-figure Martin Bormann, which is foiled by the discovery of a dummy and a tape recorder in the "man's" sick room. In other early-season episodes, for example "The Spy" and the pilot episode, agents are shown shooting people when necessary (usually underlings or enemy soldiers). To get around this restriction, many missions instead involve the IMF setting up its targets to be killed by their own people or other enemies, such as the second-season, two-part story "The Council", later released to European movie houses under the title Mission Impossible vs. the Mob. Overall, however, gunplay is relatively rare from the IMF, as its methods are more sophisticated and subtle.

=== Fifth season ===
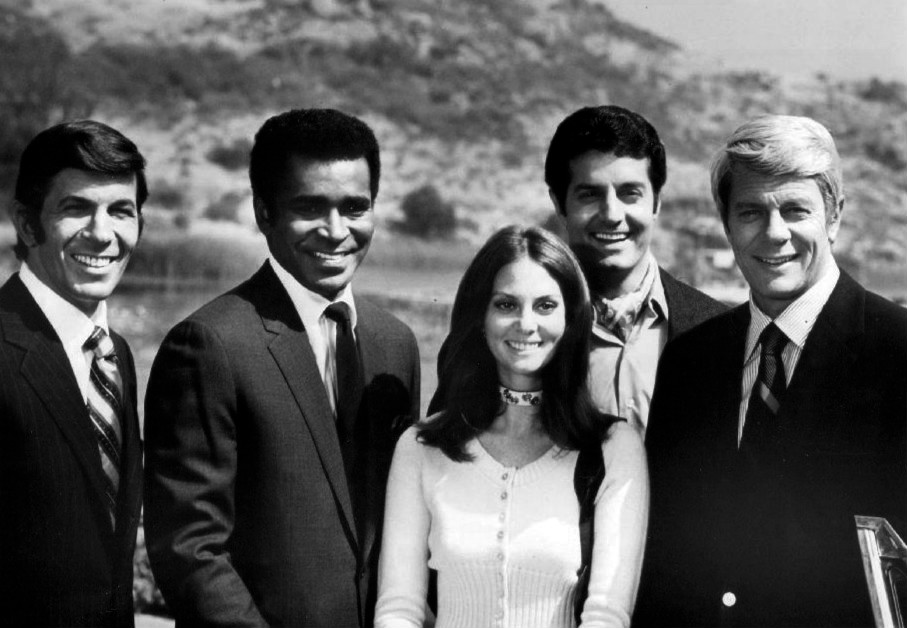
Season five (1970–1971): Leonard Nimoy, Greg Morris, Lesley Ann Warren, Peter Lupus, and Peter Graves

During the fifth season, with Paramount executives having gained greater control, new producer Bruce Lansbury began to phase out international missions. These were more expensive to film, often requiring sets to be purpose-built, along with special costuming, etc., all of which was avoided with domestic settings. This would manifest itself the following year with the IMF frequently battling organized crime, though the fifth season still featured more international forays than not. The gangland bosses are usually associated with a criminal organization called the "Syndicate", a generic organization, or its franchises. When describing such assignments, the taped message usually notes that the target is outside the reach of "conventional law enforcement".

The objective of such missions is usually to obtain evidence that might be admissible in court, often taking the form of tricking the mobsters into making confessions while being recorded. Manipulating the targets into killing one another became much less common as well. Lansbury also attempted to replace Peter Lupus, who was expressing dissatisfaction with his part at this time, with Sam Elliott. Over the course of the fifth season, Lupus's William "Willy" Armitage appeared in 13 of 23 episodes, to the outrage of fans who demanded Armitage's return. Elliott appeared in the first filmed episode of season six, but Lupus remained in the last two seasons, with Armitage being given a larger share of screen time and more demanding duties.

== Format ==
=== Title sequence ===
The title sequence began with the lighting of a fuse. The hand with the match was, until sometime in the sixth season, that of creator Bruce Geller; in the revival series, the hand belonged to Peter Graves, who was shown holding the match. The fuse burned from left to right across the screen over clips of scenes in the current episode. This was followed by lead actor credits. The show's iconic theme music played throughout the title sequence. In the fifth season, the series introduced a variation of the theme, coinciding with episodes featuring Dr. Doug Robert during that season. Though Robert did not appear in subsequent seasons, altered versions of the theme were used. The opening title sequences were created for each episode by optical effects artist Howard A. Anderson Jr.

=== Tape scene ===
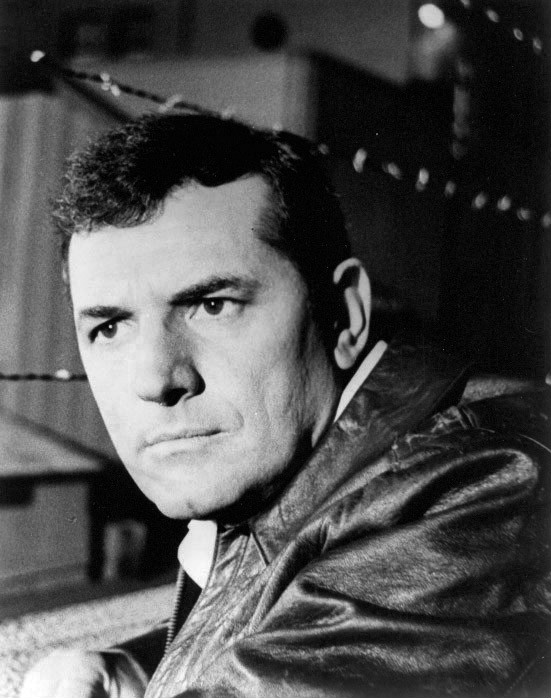
Steven Hill as Dan Briggs

Most episodes begin with Briggs or Phelps retrieving a hidden tape recorder (or, rarely, a phonograph record) along with an envelope of photos and information that describes the mission. The taped instructions were read by voice actor Robert Cleveland "Bob" Johnson, who was uncredited even though he was heard in almost every episode. The character on tape is never seen, named or identified in any meaningful way, or referenced outside the tape scene. Only the IM Team Leader hears his instructions, although Cinnamon received the instructions in one first season episode.

The taped message usually states, "Your mission, Dan/Jim, should you choose to accept it" or words to that effect, with a brief explanation of the mission's objective. At the conclusion, the listener is reminded, "As always, should you or any of your IM Force be caught or killed, the Secretary will disavow any knowledge of your actions." . At the conclusion of the instructions, Phelps/Briggs is notified, "This tape will self-destruct in five [or, occasionally, "10"] seconds. Good luck, Dan/Jim." Smoke then rises from the recorder as the tape is automatically destroyed.

Some early episodes depict Briggs applying a chemical to the tape and blowing air onto it, triggering a reaction that destroys the recording. This method was abandoned due to cost, and the effect was replicated by piping smoke through the recorder. The word "self-destruct" had existed since at least the 1950s, but was popularized by the series to the point that it is sometimes claimed to have been newly invented.

A few episodes, mostly in the first season, deviated from the use of photos and a self-destructing tape in the mission briefing. The series pilot involved a phonograph record, which was delivered to Briggs in an airtight plastic envelope and which would "decompose one minute after the breaking of the seal" from exposure to air. A record used in another episode had to be played on a vintage phonograph, which had been rigged to scratch the record so badly as to render it unplayable once the briefing was complete. In another, Briggs received his instructions from a speaker in a drive-in movie theater. In a few instances, the tape ended with instructions for the listener to dispose of it himself; Briggs/Phelps would toss it into an incinerator or some other device to destroy it.

After the first year, an entire season's worth of tape scenes were usually filmed all at once prior to production of the rest of the episodes. The voice instructions were added later, and the cast and crew never knew which tape scene would appear with which episode until it was broadcast. Some tape scenes were reused, with only minor changes to various insert shots and Johnson's recorded voice over. In the first season, for example, the same tape scene was used for both "Wheels" and "Legacy". The only differences were that the tape gave a different set of instructions in each episode, and a different set of insert shots of the photographs that Briggs is viewing is used. The cost-saving practice of recycling tape scenes continued throughout the series run; generally, each season reused at least one tape scene. One particular tape scene, of Phelps finding a tape in a parking lot attendant's hut, was used in three widely scattered episodes: "The Astrologer", "Recovery", and "The Vault".

In the fifth season, the producers experimented with the format by sometimes eliminating the taped briefing (and/or the team meeting in Phelps's apartment), starting the episode with the mission already underway.

=== Dossier scene ===
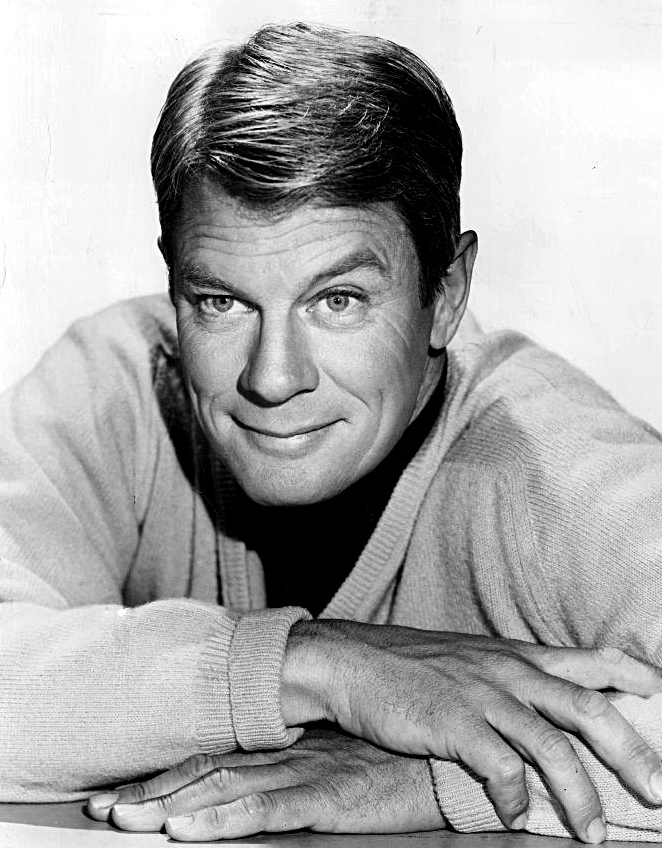
Peter Graves as Jim Phelps, 1967

The tape scene was followed by what White refers to as the "Dossier Scene". Briggs or Phelps, in his apartment, retrieves an over-sized, leather-bound folder from a locked drawer. The folder contains plastic-wrapped dossiers (usually featuring standard 8×10 glossies) of the available IMF agents. Briggs/Phelps would toss the selected agents' dossiers onto a coffee table. According to White, most of the rejected dossiers were various series staffers and their spouses, including Geller and his wife. A contemporary article in TV Guide claimed that many of the disregarded photos were of studio and network executives, and that it was considered a measure of one's status in the studio and network hierarchies to appear there, but White makes no such statement.

In early seasons, the agents selected often included guest stars playing agents with specific skills not possessed by the usual team. A doctor, particularly a specialist in a condition known to afflict the target, was a common guest agent. In numerous early episodes, the IMF leader would choose only two or three team members, though at least one of the main credited cast members was always involved. In one episode, "Elena", the team consisted of Rollin Hand and Dr. Carlos Enero (guest star Barry Atwater). Almost as often, however, Briggs would choose all of the regulars, plus one, two, or even three others.

In later seasons, the team was more fixed, consisting of the regular cast and less dependent on guest agents. Numerous dossier scenes from the Peter Graves episodes feature Phelps thumbing through photographs only to unfailingly choose the series regulars. By the third season, the dossier scene had been deemed somewhat disposable, appearing only when needed to introduce a guest agent. The first mission without the dossier scene was the last mission of the second season, "The Recovery". It was dropped entirely as of season five.

In the pilot episode, the recorded message states that the team leaders have unlimited resources and wide discretion in choosing their team.

=== Apartment scene ===
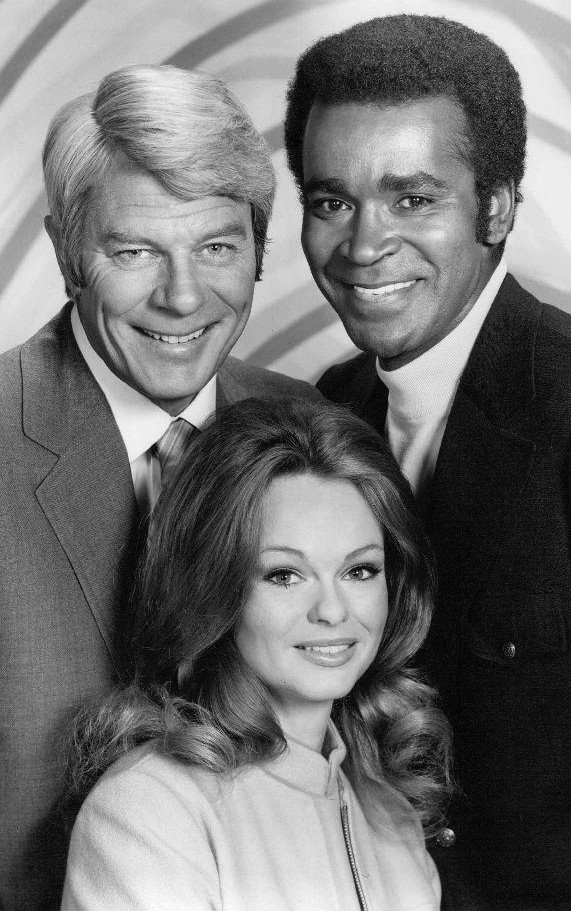
Peter Graves, Greg Morris, Lynda Day George

In the third segment of the opening act, called the "apartment scene" by White, the team would convene for their final briefing in the leader's apartment. Although the series was shot in color, the apartment had a black, white, and gray color scheme, such that the apartment was sometimes referred to off-camera as the black-and-white room. Steven Hill once suggested that an American flag be placed on a wall of Briggs' apartment, but Bruce Geller vetoed the idea to maintain the scheme. Two exceptions are the first-season episodes "Operation Rogosh", when the team immediately springs into action to capture their target in a staged auto accident; and "Action!", where the team meeting took place in another apartment.

The apartment scene acted as a teaser. Team members would make vague references to preparations necessary for the mission's successful execution, while leaving most details undisclosed. It is never clear who devised the plan, although the team leader is often shown writing or making notes. Preparations and the necessary logistics were almost never shown, and only a short period of time is implied to have elapsed from the initial assignment until the team is in the field. Early episodes occasionally showed more of the preliminaries. This scene also demonstrated and established credibility for various gadgets or ploys that were key to the plan, such as a TV camera hidden in a brooch, a miniature radio-controlled hovercraft, a chess-playing computer, a "mentalist" or sleight-of-hand act, or a trained animal. In addition, this scene would establish, or at least hint at, the specialties and roles of any guest agents. Team members posed questions about aspects of the plan or why an alternative was not considered, providing the writers with an opportunity to preemptively explain plot holes. When summing up, Phelps often stressed the difficulties in the action they were about to undertake, or some key element of the plan vital to its success, such as a deadline by which the mission had to be completed.

According to White, the producers decided to phase out the tape recorder and apartment scenes and drop the dossier scene in the fifth season. By the end of that season, however, the tape and apartment scenes were restored, but the dossier scene was eliminated for the rest of the series run. This is White's version, but in fact episodes without the tape and/or the meeting scenes were few. The 1980s revival reinstated the "dossier scene" in the first episode, when Phelps selects his new team, but since the same team appeared in subsequent episodes, no other dossier scenes were made.

=== Plan ===
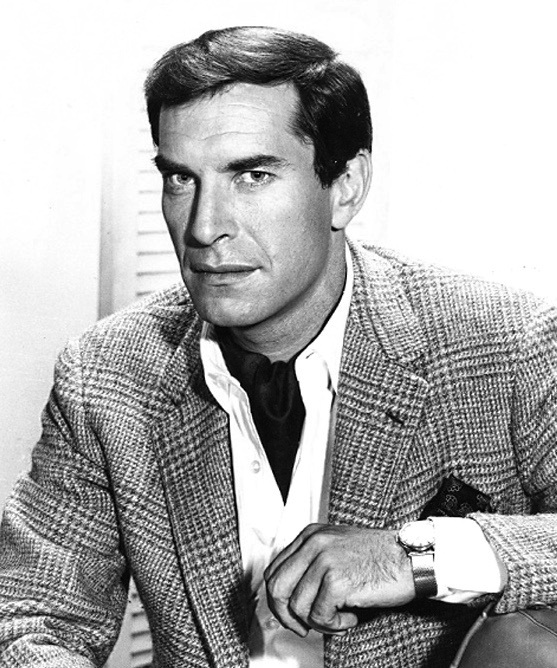
Martin Landau as Rollin Hand, 1968

The episode then depicted the plan being put into action with clockwork precision. This almost always involved elaborate and often multiple deceptions. William Read Woodfield and Allan Balter served as story consultants for the first two seasons. According to White, Woodfield and Balter relied heavily on the Maurer book The Big Con for their inspiration. Hence, Briggs/Phelps became the "grifter-in-charge", Rollin Hand and Cinnamon Carter were highly effective "ropers", and Barney Collier and Willy Armitage were experts at building or equipping "big stores".

Certain team members, as masters of disguise, impersonate the target or someone connected to the target using facial prosthetics (realistic latex face masks) and make-up. A few early season episodes showed the painstaking creation and application of these masks, usually by Rollin Hand. This was later omitted as the audience presumably became familiar with the team's methods. In the 1980s revival, the mask-making process involved a digital camera and computer, and was mostly automatic. In most cases, the guest star would play the role of both the original and the agent-imposter (ostensibly Rollin, Paris, or Casey). Some impersonations are done with the explicit cooperation of the person being impersonated. In some cases, the same actor playing the IMF agent also portrayed the person to be impersonated; this most frequently occurred during Martin Landau's tenure on the series, notably in the pilot, or supplied the voice of the person being impersonated by dubbing. Most episodes included a dramatic "reveal" (also referred to as the "peel-off") near the end of the episode, in which the team member would remove the mask.

Bona fides would be created to aid infiltration of the target government or organization. Various other technological methods were used, as well. Telephone or radio calls were often rerouted so the team could answer them. Faked radio or television broadcasts are common, as are elevators placed under the team's control. In some missions, a very elaborate simulated setting is created, such as a fake train or plane journey, submarine voyage, aftermath of a major disaster, or even the take-over of the United States by a foreign government. The IMF convinces their target that several years have passed while the target was in a coma or suffering from amnesia, in a particularly elaborate ploy used on more than one occasion. In another instance, the IMF even convinced its target, an aging mobster (played by William Shatner) that time has somehow been turned back more than 30 years, and he is a young man again.

The plans regularly turn on elaborate psychology. The team usually arranged for a situation to arise that the target would react to predictably, and the team would guide the outcome to the desired end. Many plans simply cause the target to become confused or erratic or irrational, lose self-assurance, lose trust in subordinates or partners, etc., and fall back on predictable acts of desperation. In other cases, the target's subordinates would replace the target and then act according to the team's predictions. These various ploys typically resulted in either information being revealed to the team, or the target's disgrace and discrediting, or both.

In many early episodes, the mission was to "neutralize" the target, and the target is ultimately killed by his superiors, staff, or rivals. This was rarely shown on screen; instead, the team would hear a gunshot as they decamped. In later seasons, where the targets were usually organized-crime figures or similar, the mission goal is often simply to collect incriminating evidence not obtainable by "conventional law-enforcement agencies". The team is not above falsifying such evidence as a last resort. Only four times did the IMF team directly cause the death of villains. In "Snowball in Hell", a sadistic warden is blown up by his own nuclear material; in "The Carriers", Briggs kills a guard and the IMF force infects an American expert with a deadly disease; in "The Memory Mission", two guards are electrocuted and two are shot by the IMF force; in "The Legacy", the IMF is involved in a gun battle with neo-Nazis in which one opponent is killed.

Dramatic tension was provided by situations in which team members appear to be in danger of being discovered (especially before commercial breaks). Sometimes, unexpected events occur that force the team to improvise. On occasion, an outside party or one of the targets realizes what is happening and puts the plan at risk.

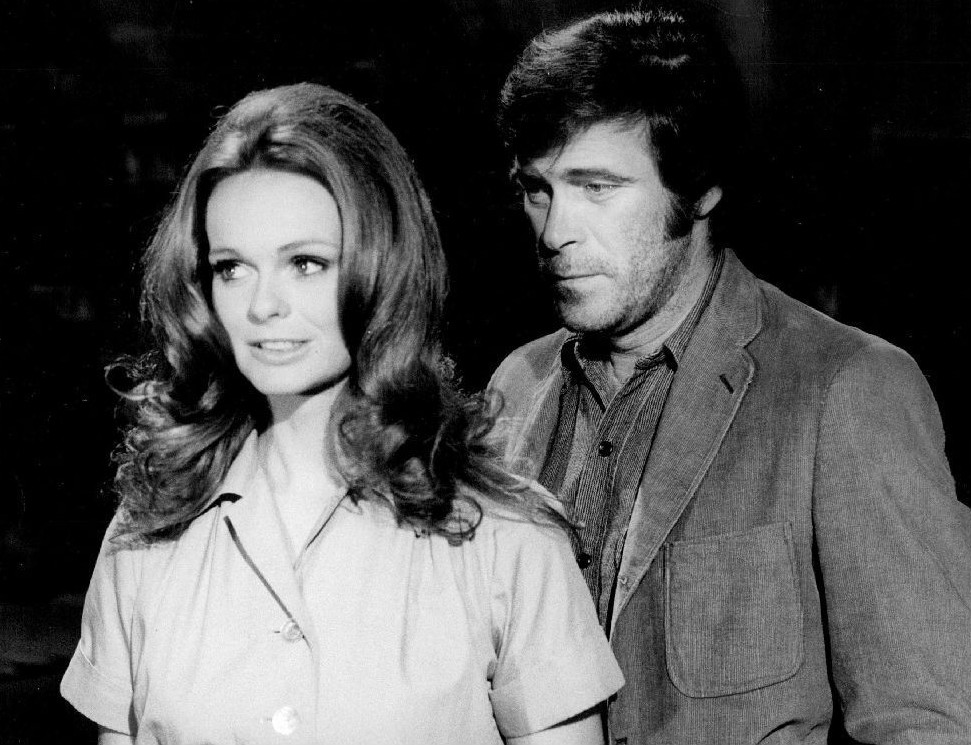
Lynda Day George and Christopher George on Mission: Impossible, 1971.

=== Conclusion ===
In most cases, the action lasted right to the final seconds. A dramatic device frequently used at the end was the sound of a gunshot or a scream in the distance as the target is killed by his associates as the IMF team makes their getaway. Most often they leave in a nondescript panel truck, with the episode ending in a freeze frame. On one particular episode, the team escapes in a van after leaving a secret underground enemy base that is destroyed by a series of explosions. In the 1980s revival, this format was altered with the addition of a tag scene showing the IMF team regrouping (often still in disguise) and walking away. From the middle of the second season onwards, Jim Phelps often makes a quip.

=== Off-book missions ===
In a few instances, a personal matter involving Briggs, Phelps or another IMF operative would result in an "off-book" mission. This first occurred in the opening season, when a "syndicate" boss kidnaps and threatens to kill the teen-aged daughter of a friend of Briggs unless he removes a grand-jury witness against the mobster from police protective custody. (How this man knew Briggs was capable of such a task was not explained.) In another instance, Phelps is captured and other team members rally to free him. The last such instance was near the end of the series, when the survivors of a previous IMF operation (season six's "Casino") recognize a vacationing Phelps from security camera photos and kidnap him to force his team to retrieve evidence that a plea-bargaining mobster is about to turn over to authorities. A mistake causes Cinnamon Carter to be exposed and captured by the villains, and Phelps concocts a plan to rescue her. One episode featured Phelps on a personal mission, in which he visits his small hometown and learns that several of his childhood acquaintances have been murdered and the local law enforcement chief is unqualified to cope. In another episode, a friend of Phelps is framed for murder, giving Phelps only 24 hours to find the real killer, prove his friend's innocence, and save his life. On two occasions, he is captured and the team has to rescue him. In "Cat's Paw", team members volunteer to go against the organization responsible for murdering Barney's brother. Willy is shot and captured in one episode, and captured and tortured by a drug kingpin in another. Paris is kidnapped and brainwashed in an attempt to get him to kill Phelps. In another episode, Paris (whilst impersonating somebody else in a fictional Latin-American country) is kidnapped by a rebel/revolutionary guerilla group who believe that he is the character being impersonated. Jim and Rollin are on a hunting trip when Jim is taken mysteriously ill. (It turns out the residents of a "Norman Rockwell" town are hired assassins who attempt to poison Phelps when he stumbles on their secret.) In the 1980s series, former IMF agent Barney Collier is framed for a crime he did not commit and the IMF team has to extricate him, leading to a reunion of Barney with his son and IMF agent Grant Collier (played by real-life father and son Greg and Phil Morris. At one point, Greg plays Grant impersonating Barney.)

=== Filming locations ===
The original series was mostly filmed on the Paramount lot, with location work around Hollywood and the Los Angeles Basin. The pilot episode was filmed at Mount St. Mary's College (Brentwood Campus) with special guest star Wally Cox. Other first season locations included the Natural History Museum of Los Angeles County ("Old Man Out") and the Los Angeles Union Pacific rail yard ("The Train"). Pasadena and the Caltech campus were common locations. Another noted location was the Bradbury Building, used in other films and series (from The Outer Limits to Blade Runner). One episode ("Trial by Fury") was filmed at the Stalag 13 set of Hogan's Heroes.

=== Cancellation ===
Paramount had the option to cancel the series after the seventh season, and did so because it could make more money syndicating the show than producing new episodes. A dispute between Paramount president Frank Yablans and CBS president Robert Wood was also a factor in the cancellation decision.

At the time of the cancellation, the production team had already started writing several stories for a prospective eighth season.

== Episodes ==
| Season | Episodes | Originally released | | Rank | Avg. rating/ Avg. viewers |
| Season | Episodes | First released | Last released | Rank | Avg. rating/ Avg. viewers |
|---|---|---|---|---|---|
| 1 | 28 | September 17, 1966 | April 22, 1967 | TBA | TBA |
| 2 | 25 | September 10, 1967 | March 17, 1968 | #32 | 19.80 |
| 3 | 25 | September 29, 1968 | April 20, 1969 | #12 | 23.30 |
| 4 | 26 | September 28, 1969 | March 29, 1970 | #50 | 17.10 |
| 5 | 23 | September 19, 1970 | March 17, 1971 | TBA | TBA |
| 6 | 22 | September 18, 1971 | February 26, 1972 | #31 | 19.30 |
| 7 | 22 | September 16, 1972 | March 30, 1973 | #57 | 15.20 |

== Music ==
Theme

The main theme was composed by Argentine composer, pianist, and conductor Lalo Schifrin and is noted for being in 5/4 time. About the unusual time signature, Schifrin joked that "things are in 2/4 or 4/4 because people dance with two legs. I did it for people from outer space who have five legs." The Morse code for M.I., the initials of Mission: Impossible, is two dashes followed by two dots, corresponding to the rhythm of the main theme. Schifrin wrote in his book Music Composition for Film and Television that he sometimes used Morse code for inspiration, to create unusual rhythms, for instance on the score for The Concorde... Airport '79. "The Plot" was also composed by Schifrin, who scored three episodes in the first season and went on to score at least one or two episodes for most of the other seasons (season two is the only one to have no Schifrin-scored episodes, in part because he was helping to launch Geller's new series Mannix).

Schifrin was awarded two Grammy Awards in 1968 for his work on the first season (Best Instrumental Theme and Best Original Score for a Motion Picture or TV Show). He was also nominated for two Emmys (for the first and third seasons). Among the other composers to work on the series were Jerry Fielding, Walter Scharf, Gerald Fried, Richard Markowitz, Benny Golson, Robert Drasnin, and Hugo Montenegro. Gerald Fried worked on Mission: Impossible concurrently while working on the Star Trek television series and re-used the infamous "Star Trek fight music" in several Mission: Impossible episodes.

=== The Best of Mission: Impossible – Then and Now ===
Although two albums of re-recorded music from the original series had previously been released under Schifrin's name, Music from Mission: Impossible (Dot, 1967) and More Mission: Impossible (Paramount, 1968) the original scores were not commercially available until 1992 when GNP Crescendo Records released The Best of Mission: Impossible – Then and Now featuring five scores by Lalo Schifrin for the original series and five by John E. Davis for the revival. Schifrin also scored three episodes of the revival, including the premiere, but none were included.

1. "Mission: Impossible — Main Title" 0:49
2. "The Plot" (from "The Contender, Part 1") 0:51
3. "Ready" (from "The Contender, Part 1") 3:12
4. "Rollin" (from "The Contender, Part 1") 0:44
5. "Time" (from "The Contender, Part 1") 0:46
6. "Sleeping Phelps" (from "The Contender, Part 1") 1:11
7. "More Plot" (from "Submarine") 2:39
8. "Mission: Impossible Theme" (from "Submarine") 1:10
9. "Bower Hotel" (from "The Killer") 1:55
10. "Check Out Time" (from "The Killer") 2:45
11. "The Trick" (from "The Killer") 2:16
12. "Signal Light" (from "Takeover") 0:42
13. "Kate Thomas" (from "Takeover") 1:28
14. "Tape Machine" (from "Underground") 3:17
15. "Good Job" (from "Underground") 0:47
16. "Mission: Impossible — End Credit" 0:29
17. "Mission: Impossible '88 — Main Title" 1:03
18. "Tricky Ears" (from "The Plague") 0:38
19. "This Is the Chase" (from "The Plague") 2:40
20. "Croc Bait" (from "Bayou") 1:46
21. "Not Worth It" (from "The Bayou") 3:38
22. "Nice Boat" (from "The Cattle King") 0:59
23. "Bait the Hook" (from "The Cattle King") 1:48
24. "Hot Time" (from "The Cattle King") 0:44
25. "I Guess It Is" (from "The Cattle King") 1:17
26. "Freak Time" (from "The Cattle King") 1:34
27. "Whacko Time" (from "The Cattle King") 1:42
28. "Melt Down" (from "Deadly Harvest") 2:00
29. "Framed" (from "Deadly Harvest") 2:05
30. "Coffee" (from "Church Bells in Bogota") 1:16
31. "Ring Around the Finger" (from "Church Bells in Bogota") 1:17
32. "Mission: Impossible '88 — End Credit" 0:35
33. "An Interview with Peter Graves" 14:55
34. "Mission: Impossible Theme" — Israeli Philharmonic cond. Lalo Schifrin 6:07

=== Mission: Impossible – The Television Scores ===
On July 28, 2015, La-La Land Records released a six-disc boxed set of the series' original music.

=== Theme from Mission: Impossible ===
An electronic dance version of the theme by U2 bandmates Larry Mullen Jr. and Adam Clayton was released in 1996 to coincide with the release of the first Mission: Impossible movie. The single was a success, and it was nominated for a Grammy Award for Best Pop Instrumental Performance (losing out to Béla Fleck and the Flecktones' "The Sinister Minister").

== Awards ==
=== Primetime Emmy Awards ===
| Year | Category | Nominee(s) | Episode(s) | Result |
|---|---|---|---|---|
| 1967 | Outstanding Dramatic Series | Joseph Gantman and Bruce Geller | | Won |
| 1967 | Outstanding Continued Performance by an Actor in a Leading Role in a Dramatic Series | Martin Landau | | Nominated |
| 1967 | Outstanding Continued Performance by an Actress in a Leading Role in a Dramatic Series | Barbara Bain | | Won |
| 1967 | Outstanding Writing Achievement in Drama | Bruce Geller | "Pilot" | Won |
| 1967 | Outstanding Individual Achievements in Film and Sound Editing | Paul Krasny and Robert Watts | | Won |
| 1967 | Individual Achievements in Music – Composition | Lalo Schifrin | | Nominated |
| 1968 | Outstanding Dramatic Series | Joseph Gantman | | Won |
| 1968 | Outstanding Continued Performance by an Actor in a Leading Role in a Dramatic Series | Martin Landau | | Nominated |
| 1968 | Outstanding Continued Performance by an Actress in a Leading Role in a Dramatic Series | Barbara Bain | | Won |
| 1968 | Outstanding Directorial Achievement in Drama | Lee H. Katzin | "The Killing" | Nominated |
| 1968 | Outstanding Writing Achievement in Drama | Allan Balter and William Read Woodfield | "The Seal" | Nominated |
| 1968 | Outstanding Achievement in Art Direction and Scenic Design | Bill Ross | "Echo of Yesterday" | Nominated |
| 1968 | Outstanding Achievement in Film Editing | David Wages | "The Photographer" | Nominated |
| 1968 | Outstanding Achievement in Film Editing | Robert Watts | "The Traitor" | Nominated |
| 1968 | Outstanding Achievement in Musical Composition | Lalo Schifrin | "The Seal" | Nominated |
| 1968 | Special Classification of Individual Achievements | Joseph G. Sorokin | "The Survivors" | Nominated |
| 1969 | Outstanding Dramatic Series | Bruce Geller | | Nominated |
| 1969 | Outstanding Dramatic Program | Alan Balter and William Read Woodfield | "The Execution" | Nominated |
| 1969 | Outstanding Continued Performance by an Actor in a Leading Role in a Dramatic Series | Peter Graves | | Nominated |
| 1969 | Outstanding Continued Performance by an Actor in a Leading Role in a Dramatic Series | Martin Landau | | Nominated |
| 1969 | Outstanding Continued Performance by an Actress in a Leading Role in a Dramatic Series | Barbara Bain | | Won |
| 1969 | Outstanding Continued Performance by an Actor in a Supporting Role in a Series | Greg Morris | | Nominated |
| 1969 | Outstanding Achievement in Art Direction and Scenic Design | Lucien Hafley and Bill Ross | "The Bunker" | Won |
| 1969 | Outstanding Achievement in Musical Composition | Lalo Schifrin | "The Heir Apparent" | Nominated |
| 1970 | Outstanding Performance by an Actor in a Supporting Role in Drama | Greg Morris | | Nominated |
| 1970 | Outstanding Achievement in Art Direction or Scenic Design – For a Dramatic Program or Feature Length Film, a Single Program of a Series or a Special Program | Lucien M. Hafley (set decorator) and Gibson Holley (art director) | | Nominated |
| 1970 | Outstanding Achievement in Cinematography for Entertainment Programming – For a Series or a Single Program of a Series | Al Francis | | Nominated |
| 1970 | Outstanding Achievement in Film Editing for Entertainment Programming – For a Series or a Single Program of a Series | Arthur David Hilton | | Nominated |
| 1970 | Outstanding Achievement in Film Sound Mixing | Gordon L. Day and Dominick Gaffey | | Won |
| 1970 | Outstanding Achievement in Any Area of Creative Technical Crafts | Jonnie Burke (Special Visual Effects) | | Nominated |
| 1971 | Outstanding Achievement in Film Sound Editing | Don Crosby, Douglas H. Grindstaff, Joe Kavigan, Chuck Perry and Frank White | | Nominated |
| 1971 | Outstanding Achievement in Makeup | Robert Dawn | | Won |
| 1972 | Outstanding Performance by an Actor in a Supporting Role in Drama | Greg Morris | | Nominated |
| 1972 | Outstanding Achievement in Art Direction or Scenic Design – For a Dramatic Program or Feature Length Film Made for Television, a Single Program of a Series or a Special Program | Lucien M. Hafley (set decorator) and Gibson Holley (art director) | | Nominated |
| 1973 | Outstanding Continued Performance by an Actress in a Leading Role (Drama Series – Continuing) | Lynda Day George | | Nominated |
| 1973 | Outstanding Achievement in Art Direction or Scenic Design – For a Dramatic Program or Feature Length Film Made for Television, a Single Program of a Series or a Special Program | Lucien M. Hafley (set decorator) and Gibson Holley (art director) | | Nominated |

=== Golden Globe ===
| Year | Category | Nominee(s) | Result |
|---|---|---|---|
| 1968 | Television Series – Drama | | Won |
| 1968 | Actor in a Television Series – Drama | Martin Landau | Won |
| 1968 | Actress in a Television Series – Drama | Barbara Bain | Nominated |
| 1969 | Actor in a Television Series – Drama | Peter Graves | Nominated |
| 1970 | Actor in a Television Series – Drama | Peter Graves | Nominated |
| 1971 | Actor in a Television Series – Drama | Peter Graves | Won |
| 1971 | Best Supporting Actress – Television | Lesley Ann Warren | Nominated |
| 1972 | Actress in a Television Series – Drama | Lynda Day George | Nominated |

=== Edgar ===
- Best Episode in a TV series – Jerome Ross, for "Operation Rogosh", 1967

== Innovations and influences ==
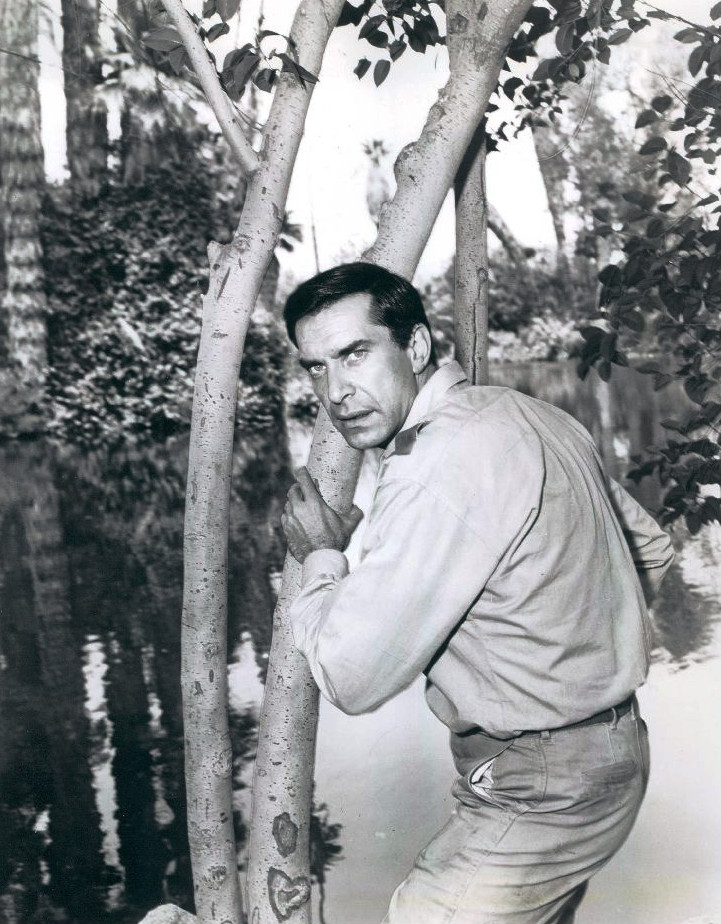
Martin Landau as Rollin Hand, 1969

Each episode's title sequence was composed of a number of very short clips of key scenes from the subject episode. Although this was, and remains, very rare for series television, it was already being done on I Spy, which like Mission opened with the lighting of a fuse. Several British teleseries produced by Gerry Anderson and his then wife Sylvia Anderson, the contemporaneous Thunderbirds (made in 1964) and the mid-1970s Space: 1999 (which starred Mission: Impossible alumni Martin Landau and Barbara Bain) amongst them, also showed clips in the opening sequence. The reimagined Battlestar Galactica TV series also used this device. The clips in the opening sequence were chosen to showcase dramatic moments in the upcoming mission, such as moments of surprise, moments of violence, or equipment in use. In particular, the first clip shown was often someone getting punched and/or knocked out. For the first two seasons, the closing credits showed clips from that mission in freeze frame. At the start of 1968, when Paramount took over from Desilu, the same clips were shown during the closing credits across episodes; later seasons eschewed that approach, featuring a freeze frame of the hand lighting the fuse.

Mission: Impossible is still recognized for its innovative use of music. Composer Lalo Schifrin wrote several distinctive pieces for the series. The visual cuts in the main title sequence were timed to the beats and measures of the theme tune—written in (unusual) 5/4 time. Most episodes included fairly long sequences showing the team members—particularly electronics expert Barney Collier—making technical preparations for the mission, usually to the accompaniment of another easily recognizable tune called "The Plot". Lalo Schifrin also wrote a theme for each main character, and the sound track for each episode incorporated variations of these throughout. Even when an episode's score is credited to some other composer, Desilu's music supervisor Jack Hunsacker would re-edit it, adding Schifrin melodies from the library. The series had great impact on film and TV music. Before Mission: Impossible, a common compliment was along the lines of "the score worked very well but never got in the way or called attention to itself." By contrast, Mission: Impossible was praised for the prominence of its music.

The original version of Mission: Impossible held the record for having the most episodes (171) of any English-language espionage television series for over 35 years (about 10 more episodes than its nearest rival, the British-produced The Avengers). Its record was broken during the eighth season of 24 in 2010.

Reruns of Mission: Impossible are still shown weekly on MeTV affiliate TV stations. The original series' seven seasons are available on the Paramount+ paid streaming service and on its own dedicated "channel" on the Pluto TV free streaming service.

== Broadcast history ==
- Saturday at 9:00–10:00 PM on CBS: September 17, 1966 – January 7, 1967
- Saturday at 8:30–9:30 PM on CBS: January 14 – April 22, 1967
- Sunday at 10:00–11:00 PM on CBS: September 10, 1967 – March 29, 1970 (the most frequent time slot)
- Saturday at 7:30–8:30 PM on CBS: September 19, 1970 – March 17, 1971
- Saturday at 10:00–11:00 PM on CBS: September 18, 1971 – December 9, 1972
- Friday at 8:00–9:00 PM on CBS: December 22, 1972 – March 30, 1973

== Home media ==
In North America, Mission: Impossible received limited VHS format release in the waning days of video cassettes: There was a subscription through Columbia House; GoodTimes Home Video issued a sell-through version of Episode 3, "Memory" (under the multiply erroneous title "Butcher of Balkins"); and Paramount Home Video released twelve two-episode volumes of "The Best of Mission: Impossible," six tapes at a time, in 1996 and 2000. Here are the episodes on the mentioned VHS releases:

Volume 1:

- Episode 1: The Pilot
- Episode 40: The Photographer

Volume 2:

- Episode 13: The Carriers
- Episode 35: The Seal

Volume 3:

- Episode 37A: The Council: Part 1
- Episode 37B: The Council: Part 2

Volume 4:

- Episode 51: The Mercenaries
- Episode 60: The Exchange

Volume 5:

- Episode 62: The Mind of Stephan Miklos
- Episode 67: Live Bait

Volume 6:

- Episode 69: The Bunker: Part 1
- Episode 70: The Bunker: Part 2

Volume 7:

- Episode 2A: Old Man Out: Part 1
- Episode 2B: Old Man Out: Part 2

Volume 8:

- Episode 4: Operation Rogosh
- Episode 23: The Train

Volume 9:

- Episode 54: The Contender: Part 1
- Episode 55: The Contender: Part 2

Volume 10:

- Episode 76: The Controllers: Part 1
- Episode 77: The Controllers: Part 2

Volume 11:

- Episode 105: The Killer
- Episode 156: Cocaine

Volume 12:

- Episode 162: The Puppet
- Episode 168: The Pendulum

For laserdisc, Volumes 1–6 are available on that format, and in Japan's case, the first four seasons in their entirety are released onto the format by CIC video.

CBS DVD (distributed by Paramount Home Entertainment) has released all seven seasons of Mission: Impossible on DVD in Regions 1, 2 & 4. The episodes of the original series of Mission: Impossible on the CBS DVD/Paramount Pictures Home Entertainment DVD releases were presented digitally restored and remastered from the original film negatives for picture clarity and sound, and are also presented in its original broadcast presentation and order.

On December 11, 2012, Paramount released Mission: Impossible – The Complete Television Collection on DVD in Region 1. The 56-disc collection features all 171 episodes of the series as well as bonus features.

On October 6, 2015, CBS Home Entertainment released a repackaged version of the complete series set, at a lower price.

On December 1, 2020, CBS Home Entertainment released a Blu-ray Disc version of the complete series set.

| DVD title | Ep # | Release date | | |
| DVD title | Ep # | Region 1 | Region 2 | Region 4 |
|---|---|---|---|---|
| The Complete 1st Season | 28 | December 5, 2006 | November 20, 2006 | November 30, 2006 |
| The Complete 2nd Season | 25 | June 5, 2007 | May 7, 2007 | April 12, 2007 |
| The Complete 3rd Season | 25 | October 29, 2007 | October 29, 2007 | November 8, 2007 |
| The Complete 4th Season | 26 | May 13, 2008 | May 5, 2008 | May 15, 2008 |
| The Complete 5th Season | 23 | October 7, 2008 | February 9, 2009 | November 6, 2008 |
| The Complete 6th Season | 22 | April 28, 2009 | May 18, 2009 | October 1, 2009 |
| The Complete 7th Season | 22 | November 3, 2009 | March 22, 2010 | October 1, 2009 |
| The Complete Collection | 171 | December 11, 2012 | August 30, 2010 | July 29, 2015 |

== Franchise successors ==
=== Television revival ===
Talk about reviving Mission: Impossible as either a television film, theatrical film, or new series began in 1978. In 1980, media reports indicated that a reunion of the original cast was in the planning stages, for a project to be called Mission: Impossible 1980. Ultimately this project was delayed into 1983 (with the working title suitably updated repeatedly) before being canceled altogether due to one plot after another being deemed inappropriate and unacceptable. In 1984, another proposed Mission: Impossible reunion was to have been a theatrical film, titled Good Morning, Mr. Phelps (Mission: Impossible – The Movie). Ultimately, the proposed large budget sank this project.

In 1988, the American fall television season was hampered by a writers' strike that prevented the commissioning of new scripts. Producers, anxious to provide new product for viewers but with the prospect of a lengthy strike, went into the vaults for previously written material. Star Trek: The Next Generation, for example, used scripts written for an aborted Star Trek revival series proposed during the 1970s. The ABC network decided to launch a new Mission: Impossible series, with a mostly new cast (except for Peter Graves, who returned as Phelps), but using scripts from the original series, suitably updated. To save even more on production costs, the series was filmed in Australia; the first season in Queensland, and the second in Melbourne. Costs were, at that time, some 20 percent lower in Australia than in Hollywood. The new Mission: Impossible was one of the first American commercial network programs to be filmed in Australia.

According to Patrick White's book, the original plan was for the series to be an actual remake of the original series, with the new cast playing the same characters from the original series: Rollin Hand, Cinnamon Carter, et al. Just before filming began, White writes, the decision was made to rework the characters so that they were now original creations, albeit still patterned after the originals, with only Jim Phelps remaining unchanged.

The new series was not a hit, but it was produced cheaply enough to keep it on the ABC schedule. The new Mission: Impossible ultimately lasted for two years; the writers' strike was resolved quickly enough that only four episodes were actual remakes, which, along with the decision to change the character names and backgrounds, resulted in the series being considered a continuation of the original series, rather than simply a remake.

The original series formula was largely repeated in the only Mission: Impossible series of the 1980s. However, by the time of the revival series, the Impossible Missions Force was larger in scale, with references now made to IMF divisions and additional teams similar to the one run by Phelps. One episode of the later series featured the only occasion in which a regular IMF agent is killed on a mission and subsequently disavowed. The 1980s series also had IMF agents using technology that nearly pushed the series into the realm of science fiction, such as one gadget that could record dreams, and another that allowed the IMF to change the surfaces (actually digital screens) of special playing cards to appear to be whatever cards the plan required.

The revived series included special appearances by several 1960s–70s IMF veterans, including Lynda Day George, and Greg Morris as Barney; Morris's son, Phil Morris, played Barney's son in the new series. Four guest stars from the original run played targets: Alex Cord, James Shigeta, and in the same episode, Barbara Luna and Australian Michael Pate.

=== Feature films ===
In the early 1970s, the second season two-part story The Council was distributed to European movie houses, theatres and cinemas as a full-length feature film titled Mission: Impossible vs. the Mob.

A feature film based upon the series was first proposed in 1978, then to be made for TV. This was the first of several attempts through the 1980s, but no feature production materialized.

Later, eight feature films were released, with one more in the works, produced by and starring Tom Cruise as team lead Ethan Hunt.

- Mission: Impossible (1996)
- Mission: Impossible 2 (2000)
- Mission: Impossible III (2006)
- Mission: Impossible – Ghost Protocol (2011)
- Mission: Impossible – Rogue Nation (2015)
- Mission: Impossible – Fallout (2018)
- Mission: Impossible – Dead Reckoning (2023)
- Mission: Impossible – The Final Reckoning (2025)

IMF leader Jim Phelps, played by Peter Graves in the original series, has a supporting role in the first of these films, and is played by Jon Voight. None of the other films feature any characters from the television series.

In the early 2000s, Mission: Impossible was the only successful franchise of Paramount Pictures.

=== Video games ===
- 1982: Spy Daisakusen. Published by Pony Canyon in Japan only. The game is based on the 1966 TV series.
- 1990: Mission: Impossible. Published by Konami under its Ultra Games label for the Nintendo Entertainment System. The game is based on the 1988–1990 TV series.
- 1998: Mission: Impossible. Published by Infogrames Entertainment for the Nintendo 64 and PlayStation. The plot is loosely based on the 1996 film.
- 1999: Mission: Impossible. Published by Infogrames Entertainment for the Game Boy Color. This version is a loose adaptation of the 1998 game.
- 2003: Mission: Impossible – Operation Surma. Published by Atari for the PlayStation 2, Xbox, GameCube, and Game Boy Advance. The game features an original story with characters from the film series, with Ving Rhames reprising his role as computer expert Luther Stickell.
- 2011: Mission: Impossible – The Game. Paramount Pictures and Funtactix social game for Facebook, based on the first three Mission: Impossible films, with a later extension based on the fourth, release to promote the film Mission: Impossible – Ghost Protocol.

In 1979, game designer Scott Adams released Mission: Impossible, a text adventure game that placed the player in the role of a secret agent trying to save the world. Adams had failed to acquire the rights to the title, and the game was quickly reissued as Impossible Mission and later Secret Mission. Beyond the title and the name "Mr. Phelps" being mentioned on the tape recording at the beginning of the game, it had no overt connection to the TV series.

The 1984 computer game Impossible Mission also featured a story in which the player takes the role of a secret agent who must stop an evil genius, but it also has no overt connection to the Mission: Impossible franchise, although the game's designer Dennis Caswell claimed that the title was chosen because "it was, at least, somewhat descriptive, and the obvious allusion to Mission: Impossible was expedient."

=== Print ===
Four original Mission: Impossible novels based upon the series were published in paperback by Popular Library between 1967 and 1969:

1. Mission: Impossible by Walter Wager as "John Tiger" * (1967)
2. Mission: Impossible #2: Code Name: Judas by Jim Lawrence as "Max Walker" * (1968)
3. Mission: Impossible #3: Code Name: Rapier by Jim Lawrence as "Max Walker" (1968)
4. Mission: Impossible #4: Code Name: Little Ivan by Walter Wager as "John Tiger" (1969)
- Whereas "John Tiger" was a pseudonym Walter Wager devised for himself (initially for what would become a series of seven original novels based on I Spy, also published by Popular Library), the Walker by-line was, very briefly, a Popular Library "house" pseudonym, used only for the two M:I novels by Lawrence and subsequently for Michael Avallone's novelization of The Last Escape.

In addition, two hardback novels for young readers were published by Whitman Books, both by Talmage Powell:

1. Mission: Impossible: The Priceless Particle (1969)
2. Mission: Impossible: The Money Explosion (1970)

Of the above, only the 1967 "John Tiger" novel featured the team as led by Dan Briggs; the rest all featured the Jim Phelps-era IMF.

Dell Comics published a Mission: Impossible comic book on a sporadic schedule that lasted from the mid-1960s to the early 1970s. Only five issues were published before the series was canceled. The first four issues were original publications; the fifth issue was a reprint of the first. In 1996, Marvel Comics published a single-issue Mission: Impossible comic which served as a prequel to the 1996 feature film.

In 1968, the GAF Corporation of Portland, Oregon/Paramount Films released a View-Master (21 stereo pictures in three round discs) with a 16-page story booklet: "Good morning Mr Phelps. The man you are looking at is Dr. Erich Rojak, the nuclear physicist who has been missing..."

== See also ==
- Gamera vs. Viras — a Japanese kaiju film inspired by Mission: Impossible.

== Bibliography ==
- White, Patrick J. (1991), The Complete Mission: Impossible Dossier, New York: Avon Books, ISBN 978-0380758777, OCLC 24914321.
- Biederman, Daniel 'Danny' (2004), The Incredible World of Spy-fi: wild and crazy spy gadgets, props, and artifacts from TV and the movies, San Francisco: Chronicle Books, ISBN 9780811842242, OCLC 475678569.
