= List of Mission: Impossible (1966 TV series) episodes =

The television series Mission: Impossible was created by Bruce Geller. The original series premiered on the CBS network in September 1966 and consisted of 171 one-hour episodes running over seven seasons before ending in March 1973. A sequel ran from 1988 to 1990. This article lists both broadcast order and production order, which often differed considerably.

== Series overview ==
Season	Episodes	Originally released		Rank	Avg. rating/ Avg. viewers
Season	Episodes	First released	Last released	Rank	Avg. rating/ Avg. viewers
1	28	September 17, 1966	April 22, 1967	TBA	TBA
2	25	September 10, 1967	March 17, 1968	#32	19.80
3	25	September 29, 1968	April 20, 1969	#12	23.30
4	26	September 28, 1969	March 29, 1970	#50	17.10
5	23	September 19, 1970	March 17, 1971	TBA	TBA
6	22	September 18, 1971	February 26, 1972	#31	19.30
7	22	September 16, 1972	March 30, 1973	#57	15.20

== Episodes ==
=== Season 1 (1966–67) ===
No. overall	No. in season	Title	Directed by	Written by	Original release date	Prod. code
1	1	"Pilot"	Bernard L. Kowalski	Bruce Geller	September 17, 1966	1
2	2	"Memory"	Charles R. Rondeau	Robert Lewin	September 24, 1966	3
3	3	"Operation Rogosh"	Leonard J. Horn	Jerome Ross	October 1, 1966	4
4	4	"Old Man Out: Part 1"	Charles R. Rondeau	Ellis Marcus	October 8, 1966	2A
5	5	"Old Man Out: Part 2"	Charles R. Rondeau	Ellis Marcus	October 15, 1966	2B
6	6	"Odds on Evil"	Charles R. Rondeau	William Read Woodfield & Allan Balter	October 22, 1966	5
7	7	"Wheels"	Tom Gries	Laurence Heath	October 29, 1966	8
8	8	"The Ransom"	Harry Harris	William Read Woodfield & Allan Balter	November 5, 1966	9
9	9	"A Spool There Was"	Bernard L. Kowalski	Ellis Marcus	November 12, 1966	6
10	10	"The Carriers"	Sherman Marks	William Read Woodfield & Allan Balter	November 19, 1966	13
11	11	"Zubrovnik's Ghost"	Leonard J. Horn	Robert Lewin	November 26, 1966	11
12	12	"Fakeout"	Bernard L. Kowalski	Leigh Chapman	December 3, 1966	7
13	13	"Elena"	Marc Daniels	Ellis Marcus	December 10, 1966	10
14	14	"The Short Tail Spy"	Leonard J. Horn	Julian Barry	December 17, 1966	14
15	15	"The Legacy"	Michael O'Herlihy	William Read Woodfield & Allan Balter	January 7, 1967	15
16	16	"The Reluctant Dragon"	Leonard J. Horn	Chester Krumholz	January 14, 1967	16
17	17	"The Frame"	Allen H. Miner	William Read Woodfield & Allan Balter	January 21, 1967	17
18	18	"The Trial"	Lewis Allan	Laurence Heath	January 28, 1967	12
19	19	"The Diamond"	Robert Douglas	William Read Woodfield & Allan Balter	February 4, 1967	18
20	20	"The Legend"	Richard Benedict	Mann Rubin	February 11, 1967	19
21	21	"Snowball in Hell"	Lee H. Katzin	Judith & Robert Guy Barrows	February 18, 1967	21
22	22	"The Confession"	Herschel Daugherty	William Read Woodfield & Allan Balter	February 25, 1967	20
23	23	"Action!"	Leonard J. Horn	Robert Lewin	March 4, 1967	22
24	24	"The Train"	Ralph Senensky	William Read Woodfield & Allan Balter	March 18, 1967	23
25	25	"Shock"	Lee H. Katzin	Laurence Heath	March 25, 1967	24
26	26	"A Cube of Sugar"	Joseph Pevney	William Read Woodfield & Allan Balter	April 1, 1967	25
27	27	"The Traitor"	Lee H. Katzin	Edward J. Lakso	April 15, 1967	26
28	28	"The Psychic"	Charles R. Rondeau	William Read Woodfield & Allan Balter	April 22, 1967	27

=== Season 2 (1967–68) ===
No. overall	No. in season	Title	Directed by	Written by	Original release date	Prod. code
29	1	"The Widow"	Lee H. Katzin	Barney Slater	September 10, 1967	33
30	2	"Trek"	Leonard J. Horn	Laurence Heath	September 17, 1967	29
31	3	"The Survivors"	Paul Stanley	William Read Woodfield & Allan Balter	September 24, 1967	28
32	4	"The Bank"	Alf Kjellin	Brad Radnitz	October 1, 1967	30
33	5	"The Slave: Part 1"	Lee H. Katzin	William Read Woodfield & Allan Balter	October 8, 1967	32A
34	6	"The Slave: Part 2"	Lee H. Katzin	William Read Woodfield & Allan Balter	October 15, 1967	32B
35	7	"Operation Heart"	Leonard J. Horn	John O'Dea & Arthur Rowe	October 22, 1967	31
36	8	"The Money Machine"	Paul Stanley	Richard M. Sakal	October 29, 1967	34
37	9	"The Seal"	Alexander Singer	William Read Woodfield & Allan Balter	November 5, 1967	35
38	10	"Sweet Charity"	Marc Daniels	Barney Slater	November 12, 1967	36
39	11	"The Council: Part 1"	Paul Stanley	William Read Woodfield & Allan Balter	November 19, 1967	37A
40	12	"The Council: Part 2"	Paul Stanley	William Read Woodfield & Allan Balter	November 26, 1967	37B
41	13	"The Astrologer"	Lee H. Katzin	James F. Griffith	December 3, 1967	39
42	14	"Echo of Yesterday"	Leonard J. Horn	Mann Rubin	December 10, 1967	38
43	15	"The Photographer"	Lee H. Katzin	William Read Woodfield & Allan Balter	December 17, 1967	40
44	16	"The Spy"	Paul Stanley	Barney Slater	January 7, 1968	41
45	17	"A Game of Chess"	Alf Kjellin	Richard M. Sakal	January 14, 1968	42
46	18	"The Emerald"	Michael O'Herlihy	William Read Woodfield & Allan Balter	January 21, 1968	43
47	19	"The Condemned"	Alf Kjellin	Laurence Heath	January 28, 1968	44
48	20	"The Counterfeiter"	Lee H. Katzin	William Read Woodfield & Allan Balter	February 4, 1968	45
49	21	"The Town"	Michael O'Herlihy	Sy Salkowitz	February 18, 1968	46
50	22	"The Killing"	Lee H. Katzin	William Read Woodfield & Allan Balter	February 25, 1968	47
51	23	"The Phoenix"	Robert Totten	S : Edward DeBlasio; S/T : John D.F. Black	March 3, 1968	48
52	24	"Trial by Fury"	Leonard J. Horn	Sy Salkowitz	March 10, 1968	49
53	25	"Recovery"	Robert Totten	William Read Woodfield & Allan Balter	March 17, 1968	50

=== Season 3 (1968–69) ===
No. overall	No. in season	Title	Directed by	Written by	Original release date	Prod. code
54	1	"The Heir Apparent"	Alexander Singer	Robert E. Thompson	September 29, 1968	52
55	2	"The Contender: Part 1"	Paul Stanley	William Read Woodfield & Allan Balter	October 6, 1968	54
56	3	"The Contender: Part 2"	Paul Stanley	William Read Woodfield & Allan Balter	October 13, 1968	55
57	4	"The Mercenaries"	Paul Krasny	Laurence Heath	October 27, 1968	51
58	5	"The Execution"	Alexander Singer	William Read Woodfield & Allan Balter	November 10, 1968	56
59	6	"The Cardinal"	Sutton Roley	John T. Dugan	November 17, 1968	58
60	7	"The Elixir"	John Florea	Max Hodge	November 24, 1968	59
61	8	"The Diplomat"	Don Richardson	Jerry Ludwig	December 1, 1968	53
62	9	"The Play"	Lee H. Katzin	Lou Shaw	December 8, 1968	57
63	10	"The Bargain"	Richard Benedict	Robert E. Thompson	December 15, 1968	61
64	11	"The Freeze"	Alexander Singer	Paul Playdon	December 22, 1968	63
65	12	"The Exchange"	Alexander Singer	Laurence Heath	January 5, 1969	60
66	13	"The Mind of Stefan Miklos"	Robert Butler	Paul Playdon	January 12, 1969	62
67	14	"The Test Case"	Sutton Roley	Laurence Heath	January 19, 1969	64
68	15	"The System"	Robert Gist	Robert Hamner	January 26, 1969	65
69	16	"The Glass Cage"	John Moxey	S : Alf Harris; T : Paul Playdon	February 2, 1969	66
70	17	"Doomsday"	John Moxey	Laurence Heath	February 16, 1969	68
71	18	"Live Bait"	Stuart Hagmann	T : James D. Buchanan & Ronald Austin; S/T : Michael Adams	February 23, 1969	67
72	19	"The Bunker: Part 1"	John Moxey	Paul Playdon	March 2, 1969	69
73	20	"The Bunker: Part 2"	John Moxey	Paul Playdon	March 9, 1969	70
74	21	"Nitro"	Bruce Kessler	Laurence Heath	March 23, 1969	71
75	22	"Nicole"	Stuart Hagmann	Paul Playdon	March 30, 1969	73
76	23	"The Vault"	Richard Benedict	S : John Kingsbridge; S/T : Judy Burns	April 6, 1969	72
77	24	"Illusion"	Gerald Mayer	Laurence Heath	April 13, 1969	74
78	25	"The Interrogator"	Reza S. Badiyi	Paul Playdon	April 20, 1969	75

=== Season 4 (1969–70) ===
No. overall	No. in season	Title	Directed by	Written by	Original release date	Prod. code
79	1	"The Code"	Stuart Hagmann	Ken Pettus	September 28, 1969	78
80	2	"The Numbers Game"	Reza S. Badiyi	Leigh Vance	October 5, 1969	80
81	3	"The Controllers: Part 1"	Paul Krasny	Laurence Heath	October 12, 1969	76
82	4	"The Controllers: Part 2"	Paul Krasny	Laurence Heath	October 19, 1969	77
83	5	"Fool's Gold"	Murray Golden	Ken Pettus	October 26, 1969	83
84	6	"Commandante"	Barry Crane	Laurence Heath	November 2, 1969	81
85	7	"Submarine"	Paul Krasny	Donald James	November 16, 1969	85
86	8	"Mastermind"	Georg Fenady	S : Richard Neil Morgan; S/T : Jerry Ludwig	November 23, 1969	79
87	9	"Robot"	Reza S. Badiyi	Howard Berk	November 30, 1969	82
88	10	"The Double Circle"	Barry Crane	Jerry Ludwig	December 7, 1969	84
89	11	"The Brothers"	Murray Golden	S : Robert C. Dennis; T : Leigh Vance	December 14, 1969	86
90	12	"Time Bomb"	Murray Golden	Paul Playdon	December 21, 1969	90
91	13	"The Amnesiac"	Reza S. Badiyi	T : Ken Pettus; S/T : Robert Malcolm Young	December 28, 1969	91
92	14	"The Falcon: Part 1"	Reza S. Badiyi	Paul Playdon	January 4, 1970	87
93	15	"The Falcon: Part 2"	Reza S. Badiyi	Paul Playdon	January 11, 1970	88
94	16	"The Falcon: Part 3"	Reza S. Badiyi	Paul Playdon	January 18, 1970	89
95	17	"Chico"	Herb Wallerstein	Ken Pettus	January 25, 1970	92
96	18	"Gitano"	Barry Crane	Laurence Heath	February 1, 1970	94
97	19	"Phantoms"	Marvin Chomsky	Laurence Heath	February 8, 1970	95
98	20	"Terror"	Marvin Chomsky	Laurence Heath	February 15, 1970	93
99	21	"Lover's Knot"	Reza S. Badiyi	Laurence Heath	February 22, 1970	96
100	22	"Orpheus"	Gerald Mayer	Paul Playdon	March 1, 1970	97
101	23	"The Crane"	Paul Krasny	Ken Pettus	March 8, 1970	99
102	24	"Death Squad"	Barry Crane	Laurence Heath	March 15, 1970	100
103	25	"The Choice"	Allan Greedy	S : Henry Sharp; T : Ken Pettus	March 22, 1970	98
104	26	"The Martyr"	Virgil W. Vogel	Ken Pettus	March 29, 1970	101

=== Season 5 (1970–71) ===
No. overall	No. in season	Title	Directed by	Written by	Original release date	Prod. code
105	1	"The Killer"	Paul Krasny	Arthur Weiss	September 19, 1970	105
106	2	"Flip Side"	John Llewellyn Moxey	Jackson Gillis	September 26, 1970	106
107	3	"The Innocent"	John Llewellyn Moxey	T : Laurence Heath; S/T : Marc Norman	October 3, 1970	108
108	4	"Homecoming"	Reza S. Badiyi	Laurence Heath	October 10, 1970	103
109	5	"Flight"	Barry Crane	S : Leigh Vance; T : Harold Livingston	October 17, 1970	110
110	6	"My Friend, My Enemy"	Gerald Mayer	S : William Wood; S/T : Gene R. Kearney	October 24, 1970	107
111	7	"Butterfly"	Gerald Mayer	S : Sheldon Stark; T : Eric Bercovici and Jerry Ludwig	October 31, 1970	102
112	8	"Decoy"	Seymour Robbie	John D. F. Black	November 7, 1970	109
113	9	"The Amateur"	Paul Krasny	Ed Adamson	November 14, 1970	112
114	10	"Hunted"	Terry Becker	Helen Hoblock Thompson	November 21, 1970	111
115	11	"The Rebel"	Barry Crane	S : Norman Katkov; S/T : Ken Pettus	November 28, 1970	104
116	12	"Squeeze Play"	Virgil W. Vogel	S : Walter Brough; S/T : David Moessinger	December 12, 1970	114
117	13	"The Hostage"	Barry Crane	Harold Livingston	December 19, 1970	117
118	14	"Takeover"	Virgil W. Vogel	S : Jerry Thomas; S/T : Arthur Weiss	January 2, 1971	118
119	15	"Cat's Paw"	Virgil W. Vogel	Howard Browne	January 9, 1971	116
120	16	"The Missile"	Charles R. Rondeau	Arthur Weiss	January 16, 1971	119
121	17	"The Field"	Reza S. Badiyi	S : Judy Burns; S/T : Wesley Lau	January 23, 1971	121
122	18	"Blast"	Sutton Roley	James L. Henderson & Samuel Roeca	January 30, 1971	122
123	19	"The Catafalque"	Barry Crane	Paul Playdon	February 6, 1971	113
124	20	"Kitara"	Murray Golden	Mann Rubin	February 20, 1971	120
125	21	"A Ghost Story"	Reza S. Badiyi	S : John D. F. Black; T : Ken Pettus; S/T : Ed Adamson	February 27, 1971	123
126	22	"The Party"	Murray Golden	Harold Livingston	March 6, 1971	124
127	23	"The Merchant"	Leon Benson	Harold Livingston	March 17, 1971	115

=== Season 6 (1971–72) ===
No. overall	No. in season	Title	Directed by	Written by	Original release date	Prod. code
128	1	"Blind"	Reza S. Badiyi	Arthur Weiss	September 18, 1971	126
129	2	"Encore"	Paul Krasny	Harold Livingston	September 25, 1971	125
130	3	"The Tram"	Paul Krasny	S : Paul Playdon; T : James L. Henderson & Samuel Roeca	October 2, 1971	131
131	4	"Mindbend"	Marvin Chomsky	James D. Buchanan & Ronald Austin	October 9, 1971	130
132	5	"Shape-Up"	Paul Krasny	Ed Adamson and Norman Katkov	October 16, 1971	133
133	6	"The Miracle"	Leonard J. Horn	Dan Ullman	October 23, 1971	129
134	7	"Encounter"	Barry Crane	Howard Berk	October 30, 1971	132
135	8	"Underwater"	Sutton Roley	Arthur Weiss	November 6, 1971	134
136	9	"Invasion"	Leslie H. Martinson	James L. Henderson & Samuel Roeca	November 13, 1971	137
137	10	"Blues"	Reza S. Badiyi	S : Orville H. Hampton; S/T : Howard Berk	November 20, 1971	139
138	11	"The Visitors"	Reza S. Badiyi	Harold Livingston	November 27, 1971	135
139	12	"Nerves"	Barry Crane	T : Garrie Bateson; S/T : Henry Sharp	December 4, 1971	140
140	13	"Run for the Money"	Marvin Chomsky	Edward J. Lakso	December 11, 1971	128
141	14	"The Connection"	Barry Crane	T : Ken Pettus; S/T : Edward J. Lakso	December 18, 1971	136
142	15	"The Bride"	John Llewellyn Moxey	Jackson Gillis	January 1, 1972	127
143	16	"Stone Pillow"	Leslie H. Martinson	Howard Browne	January 8, 1972	142
144	17	"Image"	Don McDougall	Samuel Roeca & James L. Henderson	January 15, 1972	138
145	18	"Committed"	Reza S. Badiyi	S : Laurence Heath; T : Arthur Weiss	January 22, 1972	141
146	19	"Bag Woman"	Paul Krasny	Ed Adamson and Norman Katkov	January 29, 1972	144
147	20	"Double Dead"	Barry Crane	T : Laurence Heath; S/T : Jackson Gillis	February 12, 1972	143
148	21	"Casino"	Reza S. Badiyi	Walter Brough and Howard Berk	February 19, 1972	145
149	22	"Trapped"	Leslie H. Martinson	S : Rick Husky; T : Samuel Roeca & James L. Henderson	February 26, 1972	146

=== Season 7 (1972–73) ===
No. overall	No. in season	Title	Directed by	Written by	Original release date	Prod. code
150	1	"Break!"	Paul Krasny	Samuel Roeca & James L. Henderson	September 16, 1972	151
151	2	"Two Thousand"	Leslie H. Martinson	Harold Livingston	September 23, 1972	148
152	3	"The Deal"	Leslie H. Martinson	T : Stephen Kandel; S/T : George F. Slavin	September 30, 1972	152
153	4	"Leona"	Leslie H. Martinson	Howard Browne	October 7, 1972	150
154	5	"TOD-5"	Lewis Allen	James D. Buchanan & Ronald Austin	October 14, 1972	155
155	6	"Cocaine"	Reza S. Badiyi	S : Norman Katkov; S/T : Harold Livingston	October 21, 1972	156
156	7	"Underground"	David Lowell Rich	Leigh Vance	October 28, 1972	149
157	8	"Movie"	Terry Becker	T : Arthur Weiss and Stephen Kandel; S/T : Anthony Bowers	November 4, 1972	159
158	9	"Hit"	Reza S. Badiyi	Douglas Weir	November 11, 1972	158
159	10	"Ultimatum"	Barry Crane	S : Shirl Hendryx; S/T : Harold Livingston	November 18, 1972	160
160	11	"Kidnap"	Peter Graves	Samuel Roeca & James L. Henderson	December 2, 1972	161
161	12	"Crack-Up"	Sutton Roley	S : Robert & Phyllis White; S/T : Arthur Weiss	December 9, 1972	154
162	13	"The Puppet"	Lewis Allen	Leigh Vance	December 22, 1972	162
163	14	"Incarnate"	Barry Crane	T : Stephen Kandel; S/T : Buck Houghton	January 5, 1973	165
164	15	"Boomerang"	Leslie H. Martinson	Howard Browne	January 12, 1973	164
165	16	"The Question"	Leslie H. Martinson	Stephen Kandel	January 19, 1973	157
166	17	"The Fountain"	Barry Crane	Stephen Kandel	January 26, 1973	163
167	18	"The Fighter"	Paul Krasny	S : Orville H. Hampton; T : Stephen Kandel and Nicholas E. Baehr	February 9, 1973	167
168	19	"Speed"	Virgil W. Vogel	Lou Shaw	February 16, 1973	147
169	20	"The Pendulum"	Lewis Allen	Calvin Clements Jr.	February 23, 1973	168
170	21	"The Western"	Leslie H. Martinson	Arnold & Lois Peyser	March 2, 1973	166
171	22	"Imitation"	Paul Krasny	Edward J. Lakso	March 30, 1973	153
