= Peter Lupus =

American bodybuilder and actor (born 1932)

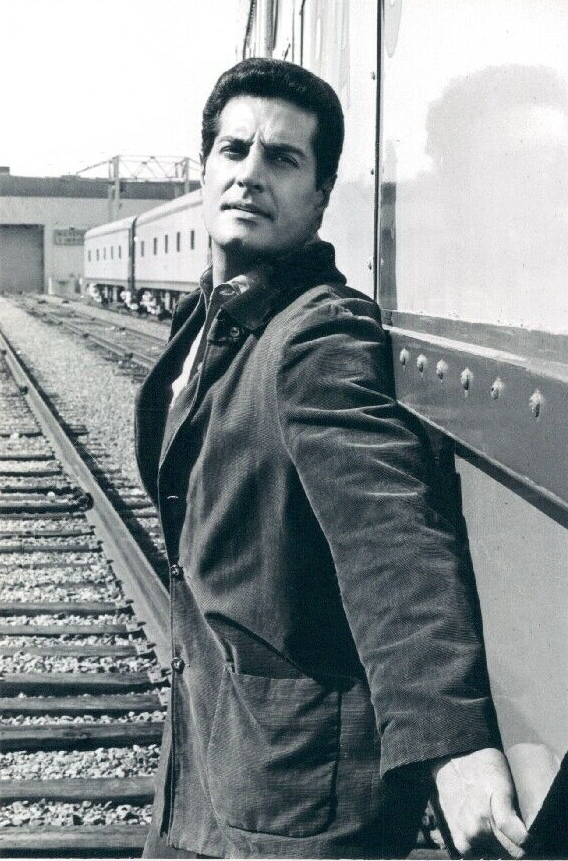
- Lupus in Mission: Impossible (1967)
- Born: June 17, 1932 (age 94); Indianapolis, Indiana, U.S.
- Other name: Rock Stevens
- Education: Butler University
- Occupations: Bodybuilder; actor
- Spouse: Sharon M. Hildebrand (m. 1960)
- Children: 1

Peter Nash Lupus Jr. (born June 17, 1932) is an American bodybuilder and actor. He is best known for his role as Willy Armitage on the television series Mission: Impossible (1966–73), as well as his appearances in several Italian peplum films under the stage name Rock Stevens.

== Early life ==
Lupus is one of three siblings born in Indianapolis, Indiana to Mary Irene (née Lambert; 1910–2003) and Peter Nash Lupus (1898–1981). He attended the Jordan College of Fine Arts at Butler University, where he also played football and basketball and was a member of Sigma Chi Fraternity, graduating in 1954.

== Career ==
=== Bodybuilder ===
Standing 6 feet 4 inches (193 cm) with a developed physique, Lupus began his career by earning the titles of Mr. Indianapolis, Mr. Indiana, Mr. Hercules and Mr. International Health Physique.

During the early 1970s, Lupus promoted European Health Spa, traveling the country to make appearances and sign autographs at several of the gyms' grand openings.

=== Actor ===
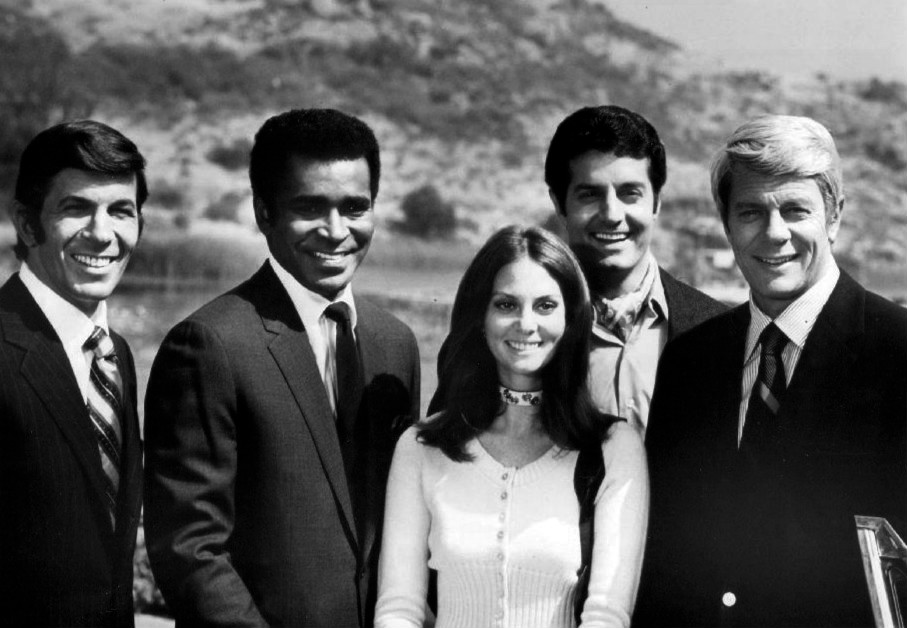
Lupus with the Mission: Impossible cast in 1970

Lupus was one of many bodybuilders who followed Steve Reeves into the Italian "sword and sandal" films of the 1960s, occasionally credited as Rock Stevens for such films as Hercules and the Tyrants of Babylon (1964), Challenge of the Gladiator (1965) and Muscle Beach Party (1964) where he starred as "Mr. Galaxy" Flex Martian. Lupus played Willy Armitage in the original Mission: Impossible television series in the 1960s. Armitage was the Impossible Missions Force's muscle man, and featured in nearly all episodes of the series. The character of Willy Armitage was the strong, silent type, usually with very little dialogue. Late in the show's run, during season five, the producers decided that his character was superfluous and he was dropped to recurring status, appearing in a little over half of that season's episodes. Outcry from fans and lack of success in finding a replacement for his character — originally replaced by Sam Elliott — resulted in his return to regular status the following season and to his getting a greater role in the stories, often assuming disguises as a convict or a thug. Only Bob Johnson and Greg Morris sustained regular roles through the show's entire run.

Lupus's other television work included a guest spot as Tarzan on Jack Benny's television show, a boxer with a glass jaw on The Joey Bishop Show, a caveman on an episode of Fantasy Island, and the recurring role of Detective Norberg on the short-lived sitcom Police Squad!

=== Playgirl pinup ===
Lupus was one of the first well-known male actors to pose with full frontal nudity for Playgirl magazine, in April 1974. Photographs of Lupus appeared in a number of issues. Before this, he was hired by the United States Air Force to appear in a series of commercials playing the role of Superman (with the permission of what is now DC Comics). He appeared for many months until the Playgirl pictorial was published.

== Personal life ==
Lupus and his wife, Sharon, have a son, Peter Nash Lupus III, who is also an actor.

On July 19, 2007, at age 75, Lupus set a world weightlifting endurance record by lifting 77,560 pounds (35,180 kg) over the course of 24 minutes, 50 seconds at the Spectrum Club in El Segundo, California. This topped the record Lupus set five years earlier in celebration of his 70th birthday of 76,280 pounds (34,600 kg) in 27 minutes.

Lupus was a member of Sheriff Joe Arpaio's volunteer posse in Maricopa County, Arizona.

== Filmography ==
=== Film ===
Year	Title	Role	Notes
1964	The Brass Bottle	Slave	Uncredited
1964	Muscle Beach Party	Flex Martian	Credited as 'Rock Stevens'
1964	Hercules and the Tyrants of Babylon	Hercules	Credited as 'Rock Stevens'
1965	Goliath at the Conquest of Damascus	Goliath	Credited as 'Rock Stevens'
1965	Challenge of the Gladiator	Spartacus	Credited as 'Rock Stevens'
1965	Giant of the Evil Island	Pedro Valverde	Credited as 'Rock Stevens'
1985	Pulsebeat	Greg Adonis	
1987	Assassination	TV Announcer	
1989	Think Big	Bad Guy	
1991	Hangfire	Sergeant Conlan	
1991	Driving Me Crazy	GM Boss	
1992	The Nutt House	Musso	
1993	Acting on Impulse	Steven Smith	
1993	Pumpkinhead II: Blood Wings	Cockfighter	
1999	Carol's Wake	Uncle Chavy	
2012	Mission: Irreparable	P.L.	
2014	Mission: Imposter	President Bush	

=== Television ===
Year	Title	Role	Notes
1962	I'm Dickens, He's Fenster	Dr. Bartless	"Nurse Dickens"
1962	The Jack Benny Program	Tarzan	"Jack Plays Tarzan"
1962	The Joey Bishop Show	Willie Foster	"Chance of a Lifetime"
1963	The Many Loves of Dobie Gillis	Casimir H. Prohosky Jr.	"Beauty Is Only Kin Deep"
1963	The Red Skelton Show	Roommate/Silent Spot	"The Mouth Shall Rise Again"
1966–73	Mission: Impossible	Willy Armitage	Main cast (161 episodes)
1966	Gypsy	Himself	"Naura Hayden/Sandy Baron/Peter Lupus"
1968–75	The Mike Douglas Show	Himself	5 episodes
1969	Pay Cards!	Himself	August 25, 1969
1970	The Carol Burnett Show	Himself (Cameo)	"Vikki Carr and Flip Wilson"
1970	Life with Linkletter	Himself	"Peter Lupus/Morton Hunt"
1970	The Real Tom Kennedy Show	Himself	"#1.35"
1970–71	The Merv Griffin Show	Himself	2 episodes
1970–74	Dinah's Place	Himself	2 episodes
1971	It's Your Bet	Himself	"Dan Dailey/Peter Lupus"
1971	The Virginia Graham Show	Himself	October 14, 1971
1979	CHiPs	Himself	"Roller Disco: Part 2"
1980	Fantasy Island	Antar	Nona/One Million B.C."
1980	The Love Boat	Dave Porter	2 episodes
1981	B.J. and the Bear	Mose	Detective Finger, I Presume"
1982	Police Squad!	Norberg	4 episodes
1984	Family Feud	Himself	2 episodes
1993	Love, Cheat & Steal	Guard #5	TV Movie
1997	Spy Game	Mr. White	"Why Spy?"
