= Mission: Impossible =

American media franchise

- Series logo
- Created by: Bruce Geller
- Original work: Mission: Impossible (1966)
- Owners: Paramount Pictures (Skydance)
- Years: 1966–present

Films and television
- Films: Mission: Impossible vs. the Mob; Film series
- Television series: Mission: Impossible (1966–1973); Mission: Impossible (1988–1990)

Games
- Video games: Mission: Impossible (1990); Mission: Impossible (1998); Mission: Impossible (1999/2000); Mission: Impossible – Operation Surma (2003)

Audio
- Soundtracks: Music from Mission: Impossible; More Mission: Impossible; Mission: Impossible; Mission: Impossible: Score; Music from and Inspired by Mission: Impossible 2; Mission: Impossible 2: Score; Mission: Impossible III; Mission: Impossible – Ghost Protocol; Mission: Impossible – Rogue Nation; Mission: Impossible – Fallout; Mission: Impossible – Dead Reckoning Part One; Mission: Impossible – The Final Reckoning
- Original music: "Theme from Mission: Impossible"; "I Disappear"; "Scum of the Earth"; "Take a Look Around"

Mission: Impossible is an American multimedia franchise based on a fictional secret espionage agency known as the Impossible Missions Force (IMF). The 1966 TV series ran for seven seasons and was revived in 1988 for two seasons. It inspired a series of theatrical motion pictures starring Tom Cruise beginning in 1996.

By 2011, the franchise had generated over $4 billion in revenue, making it one of the highest-grossing media franchises of all time.

The most recent installment, Mission: Impossible – The Final Reckoning, premiered in Tokyo on May 5, 2025, and was released internationally on May 23. It earned about $598 million worldwide, including $197.4 million in the U.S. and Canada and $400.6 million internationally, making it the highest-opening entry in the series and the eighth-highest-grossing film of 2025.

Although its title suggests finality, franchise star Tom Cruise gave mixed signals. At the Cannes premiere, he said, "It's the final ... it's not called final for nothing", while in other interviews he expressed interest in continuing the role into his eighties.

== Legacy ==
The franchise's signature theme music, composed in 5/4 time by Lalo Schifrin for the 1966 series, incorporates the Morse code for "M.I." Schifrin's composition became an enduring cultural hallmark, earning Grammy recognition. Schifrin died in June 2025 at age 93, with obituaries widely highlighting his influence on spy film music.

The Mission: Impossible films have become famous for pushing the boundaries of stunts. Each film features increasingly death-defying real-world stunts, planned meticulously by Cruise and the stunt team, and performed by Cruise himself with as few special effects as possible. Stunts have included climbing the Burj Khalifa in Mission: Impossible: Ghost Protocol, hanging onto the outside of a plane during takeoff in Mission: Impossible: Rogue Nation and riding a motorcycle off a cliff in Mission: Impossible: Dead Reckoning. The franchise has won five Taurus World Stunt Awards, two Actor Awards for its stunt team, and one Critics Choice Award for Wade Eastwood's stunt design for Mission: Impossible: The Final Reckoning.

Several actors have spoken about their experiences with the films. Jeremy Renner, who appeared in Ghost Protocol and Rogue Nation, did not return for later installments due to family commitments, stating he prioritized raising his daughter over extended location filming. Hayley Atwell, who debuted as Grace in Dead Reckoning, noted she spent over five years with the franchise, including extensive reshoots, describing it as both physically demanding and creatively rewarding.

== Media ==
=== Television series ===
Overview Mission: Impossible television series
Title	Release	Seasons	Episodes	Note(s)
Mission: Impossible (1966 TV series)	1966–1973	7	171 episodes	
Mission: Impossible (1988 TV series)	1988–1990	2	35 episodes	

=== Films ===
Overview of Mission: Impossible films
Title	Release date	Note(s)
Mission: Impossible vs. the Mob	1967	Released theatrically in Europe and Australia.
Mission: Impossible	May 22, 1996	Part of the Mission: Impossible film series.
Mission: Impossible 2	May 24, 2000	Part of the Mission: Impossible film series.
Mission: Impossible III	May 5, 2006	Part of the Mission: Impossible film series.
Mission: Impossible – Ghost Protocol	December 16, 2011	Part of the Mission: Impossible film series.
Mission: Impossible – Rogue Nation	July 31, 2015	Part of the Mission: Impossible film series.
Mission: Impossible – Fallout	July 27, 2018	Part of the Mission: Impossible film series.
Mission: Impossible – Dead Reckoning	July 12, 2023	Part of the Mission: Impossible film series.
Mission: Impossible – The Final Reckoning	May 23, 2025	Part of the Mission: Impossible film series.

=== Soundtracks ===
Overview of Mission: Impossible soundtracks
Title	Release date	Note(s)
Music from Mission: Impossible	1967	
More Mission: Impossible	1969	
Mission: Impossible (Music from and Inspired by the Motion Picture)	May 14, 1996	
Mission: Impossible – (Music from the Original Motion Picture Score)	June 18, 1996	
Music from and Inspired by Mission: Impossible 2	May 9, 2000	
Mission: Impossible 2 (Music from the Original Motion Picture Score)	June 13, 2000	
Mission: Impossible III (Music from the Original Motion Picture Soundtrack)	May 9, 2006	
Mission: Impossible – Ghost Protocol (Music from the Motion Picture)	December 13, 2011	
Mission: Impossible – Rogue Nation (Music from the Motion Picture)	July 24, 2015	
Mission: Impossible – Fallout (Music from the Motion Picture)	July 13, 2018	
Mission: Impossible – Dead Reckoning Part One (Music from the Motion Picture)	July 12, 2023	
Mission: Impossible – The Final Reckoning (Music from the Motion Picture)	May 23, 2025	

=== Video games ===
Overview of Mission: Impossible video games
Title	Platform	Release date	Note(s)
Spy Daisakusen	PC-8800 series	1982	Based on the 1966 TV series. Released in Japan only.
Spy Daisakusen	Sharp MZ	1982	Based on the 1966 TV series. Released in Japan only.
Mission: Impossible	NES	1990	Based on the 1988 TV series revival.
Mission: Impossible	MS-DOS	1991	Based on the 1988 TV series revival.
Mission: Impossible	N64	1998	Based on the 1996 film.
Mission: Impossible	PSX	1999	Based on the 1996 film.
Mission: Impossible	GBC	2000	Based on the 1996 film.
Mission: Impossible – Operation Surma	GBA	2003	
Mission: Impossible – Operation Surma	Xbox	2003	
Mission: Impossible – Operation Surma	PS2	2003	
Mission: Impossible – Operation Surma	GC	2003	
Mission: Impossible III	J2ME	2006	Developed by Gameloft
Mission: Impossible – Rogue Nation	iOS	2015	Developed by Glu
Mission: Impossible – Rogue Nation	Android	2015	Developed by Glu
Lego Dimensions - Mission: Impossible	PS3	2016	Expansion pack for Lego Dimensions. Based on the Mission: Impossible film series.
Lego Dimensions - Mission: Impossible	PS4	2016	Expansion pack for Lego Dimensions. Based on the Mission: Impossible film series.
Lego Dimensions - Mission: Impossible	Xbox One	2016	Expansion pack for Lego Dimensions. Based on the Mission: Impossible film series.
Lego Dimensions - Mission: Impossible	Xbox 360	2016	Expansion pack for Lego Dimensions. Based on the Mission: Impossible film series.
Lego Dimensions - Mission: Impossible	Wii U	2016	Expansion pack for Lego Dimensions. Based on the Mission: Impossible film series.

=== Books ===
Overview of Mission: Impossible books
Title	Release date	Author	Note(s)
Mission: Impossible 1	1967	Walter Wager (credited as John Tiger)	Part of a series
Mission: Impossible 2: Code Name: Judas	1968	Jim Lawrence (credited as Max Walker)	Part of a series
Mission: Impossible 3: Code Name: Rapier	1968	Jim Lawrence (credited as Max Walker)	Part of a series
Mission: Impossible 4: Code Name: Little Ivan	1969	Walter Wager (credited as John Tiger)	Part of a series
Mission: Impossible: The Priceless Particle	1969	Talmage Powell	Part of a series
Mission: Impossible: The Money Explosion	1970	Talmage Powell	Part of a series
Mission Impossible	1996	Peter Barsocchini	Novelization to the Tom Cruise film
Mission Impossible: The Aztec Imperative	1996	James Luceno	Tie-in series to the film series
Mission Impossible: Ring of Fire	1996	Tom Philbin	Tie-in series to the film series
Mission Impossible: The Doomsday Summit	1996	Tom Philbin	Tie-in series to the film series

=== Comics ===
Overview of Mission: Impossible comics
Title	Release date	Note(s)
Mission: Impossible	1967	Five-issue series; published by Dell Comics.
Mission: Impossible	1973	Comic strip published in TV Action. Art by John M. Burns.
Mission: Impossible	1996	Tie-in prequel one-shot to the 1996 film. Published by Marvel Comics. Written by Marv Wolfman, art by Rob Liefeld et al.

== Cast and characters ==
Overview of Mission: Impossible cast and characters
Character	TV series		Film							
Character	Mission: Impossible (1966)	Mission: Impossible (1988)	Mission: Impossible	Mission: Impossible 2	Mission: Impossible III	Mission: Impossible – Ghost Protocol	Mission: Impossible – Rogue Nation	Mission: Impossible – Fallout	Mission: Impossible – Dead Reckoning	Mission: Impossible – The Final Reckoning
Dan Briggs	Steven Hill									
Cinnamon Carter	Barbara Bain									
Barney Collier	Greg Morris	Greg Morris								
Willy Armitage	Peter Lupus									
Jim Phelps	Peter Graves	Peter Graves	Jon Voight							
Rollin Hand	Martin Landau									
The Great Paris	Leonard Nimoy									
Dana Lambert	Lesley Warren									
Dr. Doug Robert	Sam Elliott									
Lisa Casey	Lynda Day George	Lynda Day George								
Nicholas Black		Thaao Penghlis								
Max Harte		Tony Hamilton								
Grant Collier		Phil Morris								
Casey Randall		Terry Markwell								
Shannon Reed		Jane Badler								
Ethan Hunt			Tom Cruise	Tom Cruise	Tom Cruise	Tom Cruise	Tom Cruise	Tom Cruise	Tom Cruise	Tom Cruise
Luther Stickell			Ving Rhames	Ving Rhames	Ving Rhames	Ving Rhames	Ving Rhames	Ving Rhames	Ving Rhames	Ving Rhames
Eugene Kittridge			Henry Czerny						Henry Czerny	Henry Czerny
Benji Dunn					Simon Pegg	Simon Pegg	Simon Pegg	Simon Pegg	Simon Pegg	Simon Pegg
Julia Meade					Michelle Monaghan	Michelle Monaghan		Michelle Monaghan		
William Brandt						Jeremy Renner	Jeremy Renner			
Ilsa Faust							Rebecca Ferguson	Rebecca Ferguson	Rebecca Ferguson	
Alan Hunley							Alec Baldwin	Alec Baldwin		
Solomon Lane							Sean Harris	Sean Harris		
Alanna Mitsopolis White Widow								Vanessa Kirby	Vanessa Kirby	
Erica Sloane								Angela Bassett		Angela Bassett
Denlinger									Cary Elwes	Cary Elwes
Grace									Hayley Atwell	Hayley Atwell
Jasper Briggs									Shea Whigham	Shea Whigham
Gabriel									Esai Morales	Esai Morales
Paris									Pom Klementieff	Pom Klementieff
