= Franca Bianconi =

Italian figure skater and coach

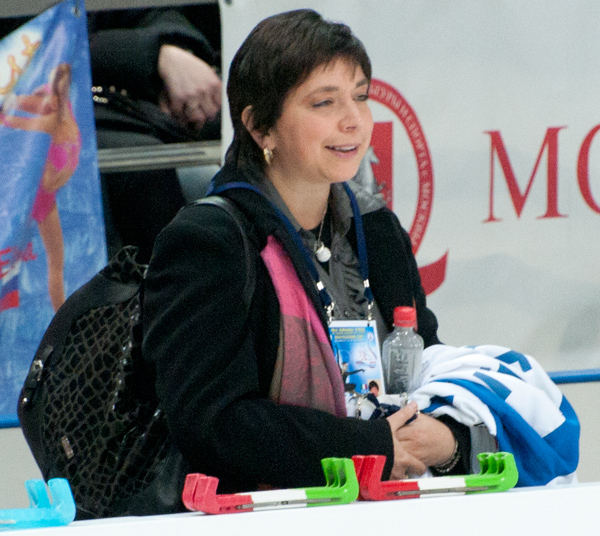
- Bianconi in 2011

Personal information
- Full name: Franca Anna Bianconi Manni
- Born: 3 March 1962 (age 64) Milan, Italy

Figure skating career
- Country: Italy
- Began skating: 1968
- Retired: 1981

Franca Anna Bianconi Manni (born 3 March 1962) is an Italian figure skating coach and former competitor. She competed at the 1980 Winter Olympics.

== Personal life ==
Bianconi was born on 3 March 1962 in Milan, Italy. She is the mother of Italian ice dancer Victoria Manni.

== Career ==
Bianconi began skating at age six in Milan. During her career, she was coached mainly by Franca Invernizzi in Milan and also spent time in Colorado training under Carlo Fassi and in Lake Placid under Tommy Litz.

Bianconi debuted at the European and World Championships in 1977. She was selected to represent Italy at the 1980 Winter Olympics in Lake Placid, New York, and finished 19th. She retired from competition in 1981 and became a coach.

Following her competitive career, Bianconi become a figure skating coach and is based at S.S.D. S.r.l. Icelab in Bergamo.

Her current students include:

- Matteo Rizzo (since he was six years old)
- Rebecca Ghilardi / Filippo Ambrosini (the 2023 European silver medalists)
- Annika Hocke / Robert Kunkel (the 2023 European bronze medalists)

Her former students include:

- Paola Tosi
- Antonio Moffa
- Valentina Marchei (as a singles skater)
- Roberta Rodeghiero
- Stefania Berton / Ondřej Hotárek (the 2013 European bronze medalists)
- Valentina Marchei / Ondřej Hotárek
- Kristen Spours
- Victoria Manni

== Competitive highlights ==
International
Event	1973–74	1974–75	1975–76	1976–77	1977–78	1978–79	1979–80	1980–81
Winter Olympics							19th	
World Championships				19th		24th		
European Championships				18th	18th	23rd		17th
National
Italian Championships	3rd		2nd	1st	2nd	2nd		2nd
