= Valentina Marchei =

Italian pair and single figure skater (born 1986)

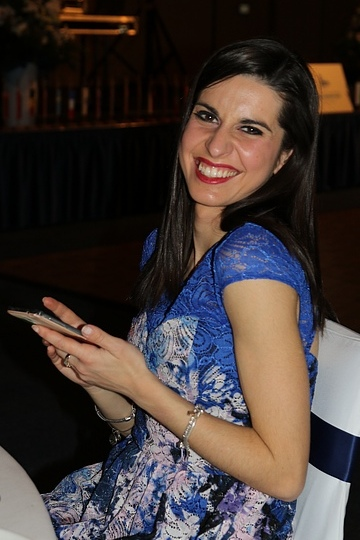
- Marchei in 2017

Personal information
- Born: 23 May 1986 (age 40) Milan, Italy
- Home town: Basiglio, Italy
- Height: 1.61 m (5 ft 3 in)

Figure skating career
- Country: Italy
- Began skating: 1993
- Retired: 2020

Medal record
Italian Championships
Gold medal – first place	2004 Milan	Singles
Gold medal – first place	2008 Milan	Singles
Gold medal – first place	2010 Brescia	Singles
Gold medal – first place	2012 Courmayeur	Singles
Gold medal – first place	2014 Merano	Singles
Gold medal – first place	2015 Turin	Pairs
Silver medal – second place	2005 Merano	Singles
Silver medal – second place	2011 Milan	Singles
Silver medal – second place	2013 Milan	Singles
Bronze medal – third place	2007 Trento	Singles
Silver medal – second place	2016 Turin	Pairs
Silver medal – second place	2017 Egna	Pairs
Silver medal – second place	2018 Milan	Pairs

Valentina Marchei (born 23 May 1986) is an Italian retired pair and single figure skater. As a singles skater, she is a five-time Italian national champion (2004, 2008, 2010, 2012, 2014). Her highest ISU Championship placements were 4th at the 2013 European Championships and 8th at the 2012 World Championships. She represented Italy at the 2014 Winter Olympics and placed 11th. Also, Marchei competed as a pair skater with Ondřej Hotárek, representing Italy. The pair finished 6th at the 2018 Winter Olympics.

== Personal life ==
Valentina Marchei was born 23 May 1986 in Milan, Italy. She is the daughter of Marco Marchei, a competitor in the marathon at the 1980 and 1984 Olympics. Her early interests were speed skating and gymnastics. She studied with a focus on sport at university and has worked as a reporter for Italian television.

== Career in singles ==
Marchei began skating in 1993. She was coached by Cristina Mauri from the age of nine.

Ahead of the 2007–08 season, Marchei spent the first part of July training with Viktor Kudriavtsev in Flims, Switzerland. She trained in Courchevel in the remainder of July and August and then Paris and Milan in the winter, coached by Pierre Trente and Cristina Mauri. Marchei injured her knee in September 2007.

In September 2008, Marchei began working with Nikolai Morozov in Hackensack, New Jersey. She missed most of the 2008–09 season after injuring her right ankle on a triple Lutz at 2008 Skate America. Marchei did not receive any Grand Prix invitations in 2009–10. She finished 8th at the 2010 European Championships. In 2010–11, Marchei returned to the Grand Prix series, competing at 2010 Skate Canada International and 2010 Cup of Russia. She was 10th at the 2011 European Championships.

In 2011, Marchei changed coaches to Jason Dungjen and Yuka Sato in Detroit. She had ankle and knee injuries in 2011. She finished 8th at the 2012 World Championships in Nice, France. Marchei represented Italy at the 2014 Winter Olympics, where she placed 11th. In September 2014, she withdrew from both of her Grand Prix assignments, the 2014 Skate Canada International and 2014 Rostelecom Cup.

== Career in pairs ==
On 2 July 2014, La Gazzetta dello Sport wrote that Marchei and Ondřej Hotárek were considering skating as a pair. Bruno Marcotte confirmed on 26 July 2014 that the two were training together. They are coached by Marcotte in Montreal and by Franca Bianconi in Milan. On 6 August 2014, Marchei sprained the medial collateral ligament of her right knee. On 8 September, she said she would resume light on-ice training in a few days. Commenting on her switch to pairs, Marchei stated: "At the beginning practicing pairs was just to do shows or stuff like that, but then it was something that got to me. It's crazy. I still do single programs at shows, but it is strange, I'm looking around, where is he?"

=== 2014–15 season ===
Marchei/Hotárek began the season by winning the bronze medal at the 2014 CS Warsaw Cup as well as the silver medal at the 2014 CS Golden Spin of Zagreb. They then went on to win the 2015 Italian Championships.

Selected to compete at the European Championships in Stockholm, Sweden, Marchei/Hotárek finished fourth.

At the World Championships in Shanghai, China, they finished eleventh.

=== 2015–16 season ===
Marchei/Hotárek started the season by winning gold at the 2015 Lombardia Trophy.

Debuting on the Grand Prix series, Marchei/Hotárek competed in the short program at 2015 Skate Canada International but withdrew on the day of the free skate due to Hotárek sustaining a concussion while practicing a triple twist. They went on to compete at the 2015 Rostelecom Cup, finishing sixth.

At the Italian Figure Skating Championships, Marchei/Hotárek won the silver medal behind Nicole Della Monica / Matteo Guarise.

Going on to compete at the 2016 European Championships in Bratislava, Slovakia, Marchei/Hotárek finished fifth. They went on to compete at the 2015 Hellmut Seibt Memorial, where they won the gold medal.

At the 2016 World Figure Skating Championships in Boston, Massachusetts, Marchei/Hotárek finished fourteenth.

=== 2016–17 season ===
Marchei/Hotárek began the season by winning the silver medal at the 2016 CS Lombardia Trophy.

They then competed on the Grand Prix series, finishing eighth at 2016 Skate America and fourth at the 2016 Rostelecom Cup. They went on to also win the gold medal at the 2016 CS Warsaw Cup.

At the 2017 Italian Championships, Marchei/Hotárek won the silver medal for the second consecutive year.

Selected to compete at the 2017 European Championships in Ostrava, Czech Republic, Marchei/Hotárek finished sixth.

Competing at the 2017 World Championships in Helsinki, Finland, Marchei/Hotárek placed ninth.

=== 2017–18 season ===
Marchei/Hotárek began the season with winning the bronze medal at the 2017 CS Lombardia Trophy.

They then competed on the 2017–18 Grand Prix series, finishing fifth at the 2017 Cup of China and fourth at the 2017 Rostelecom Cup. They also won the gold medal at the 2017 CS Warsaw Cup.

At the 2018 Italian Championships, Marchei/Hotárek won the silver medal for the third year in a row.

Competing at the 2018 European Championships in Moscow, Russia, Marchei/Hotárek finished fifth.

Selected to compete at the 2018 Winter Olympics in both the Team and Pair events, Marchei/Hotárek placed second in the free program segment of the team event, helping Team Italy finish in fourth place overall. In the pairs event, Marchei/Hotárek placed seventh in the short program and sixth in the free skate, finishing in sixth place overall.

At the 2018 World Championships in Milan, Italy, Marchei/Hotárek finished in tenth place. On 16 September 2018 Marchei announced the end of her partnership with Hotárek via Instagram.

On 1 September 2020, two years after she last competed, Marchei announced her retirement via Facebook, citing that she considered returning, if not for the ongoing pandemic.

== Programs ==
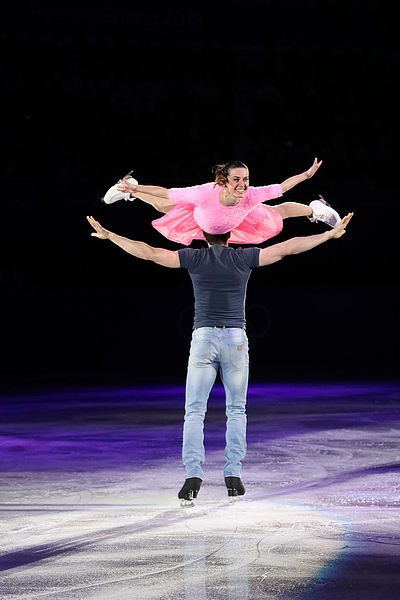
With Hotárek at the 2018 Olympics Gala

=== With Hotárek ===
Season	Short program	Free skating	Exhibition
2017–18	Tu vuò fà l'americano by Renato Carosone	Amarcord by Nino Rota	Barbie Girl by Aqua
2016–17	Seven Nation Army by The White Stripes	Skyfall (James Bond soundtrack) performed by Adele; Mission: Impossible – Rogue Nation (soundtrack)	Yesterday Performed by Michael Bolton
2015–16	Morir d'amor by Marianna Cataldi	The Way We Were by Marvin Hamlisch; Saturday Night Fever by Barry Gibb, Maurice Gibb, Robin Gibb, David Shire	
2014–15	Malagueña by Ernesto Lecuona choreo. by Massimo Scali	La Strada by Nino Rota choreo. by Corrado Giordani, Franca Bianconi	All of Me by John Legend

=== Single Skating ===
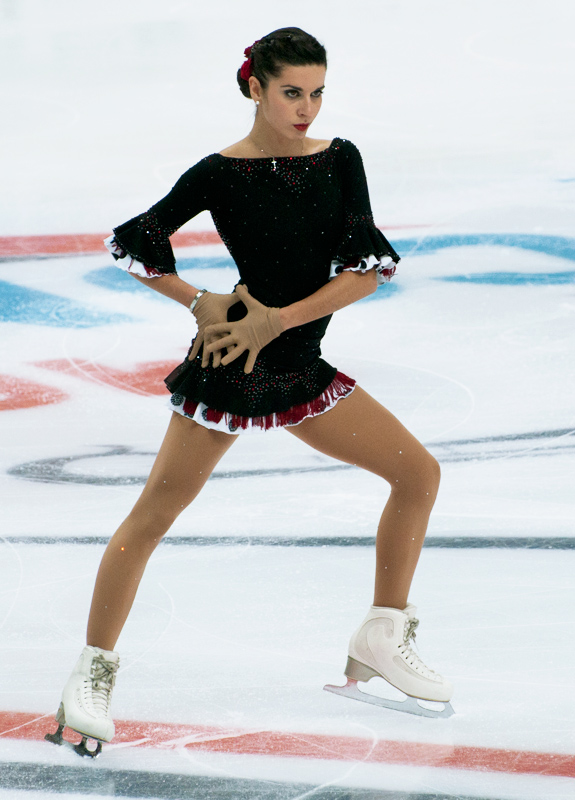
Marchei at the 2012 Rostelecom Cup

Season	Short program	Free skating	Exhibition
2013–14	Torna a Surriento by Ernesto De Curtis, Giambattista De Curtis	Nyah by Hans Zimmer performed by CH2 choreo. by Yuka Sato	
2012–13	Esperanza by Maxime Rodriguez choreo. by Massimo Scali, Giusy Galimberti	The Artist by Ludovic Bource choreo. by Yuka Sato	Toxic by Melanie Martinez; Diamonds Are a Girl's Best Friend by Jule Styne, Leo Robin performed by Marilyn Monroe
2011–12	Johnny's Mambo	Mr Pinstripe Suit by Big Bad Voodoo Daddy; Jessica's Theme from Who Framed Roger Rabbit by Alan Silvestri; Minnie the Moocher; Jumpin Jack by Big Bad Voodoo Daddy	
2010–11	Lux Aeterna (from Requiem for a Dream) by Clint Mansell	Die Fledermaus by Johann Strauss II	
2009–10	Méditation (from Thaïs) by Jules Massenet	2046 by Shigeru Umebayashi; Requiem for a Dream by Clint Mansell; The Lord of the Rings by Howard Shore	
2008–09	La traviata by Giuseppe Verdi	Theme & Polonaise (from 2046) by Shigeru Umebayashi; Requiem for a Dream by Clint Mansell	
2007–08	La traviata; Noi Siamo le Zingarelle by Giuseppe Verdi	Les Feuilles Mortes by Yves Montand	Don't Let Me Be Misunderstood by Santa Esmeralda; The Way You Look at Me by Christian Bautista
2006–07	L'Arlésienne; Carmen by Georges Bizet	Adiós Nonino by Astor Piazzolla	
2005–06	L'Arlésienne; Carmen by Georges Bizet	Xotica by René Dupéré	
2004–05	Cinderella by Sergei Prokofiev	Xotica by René Dupéré	
2003–04	Anastasia by Stephen Flaherty	Les Feuilles Mortes by Yves Montand	
2001–02	Anastasia by Stephen Flaherty	Flamenco	

== Competitive highlights ==
GP: Grand Prix; CS: Challenger Series; JGP: Junior Grand Prix

=== Pairs with Hotárek ===
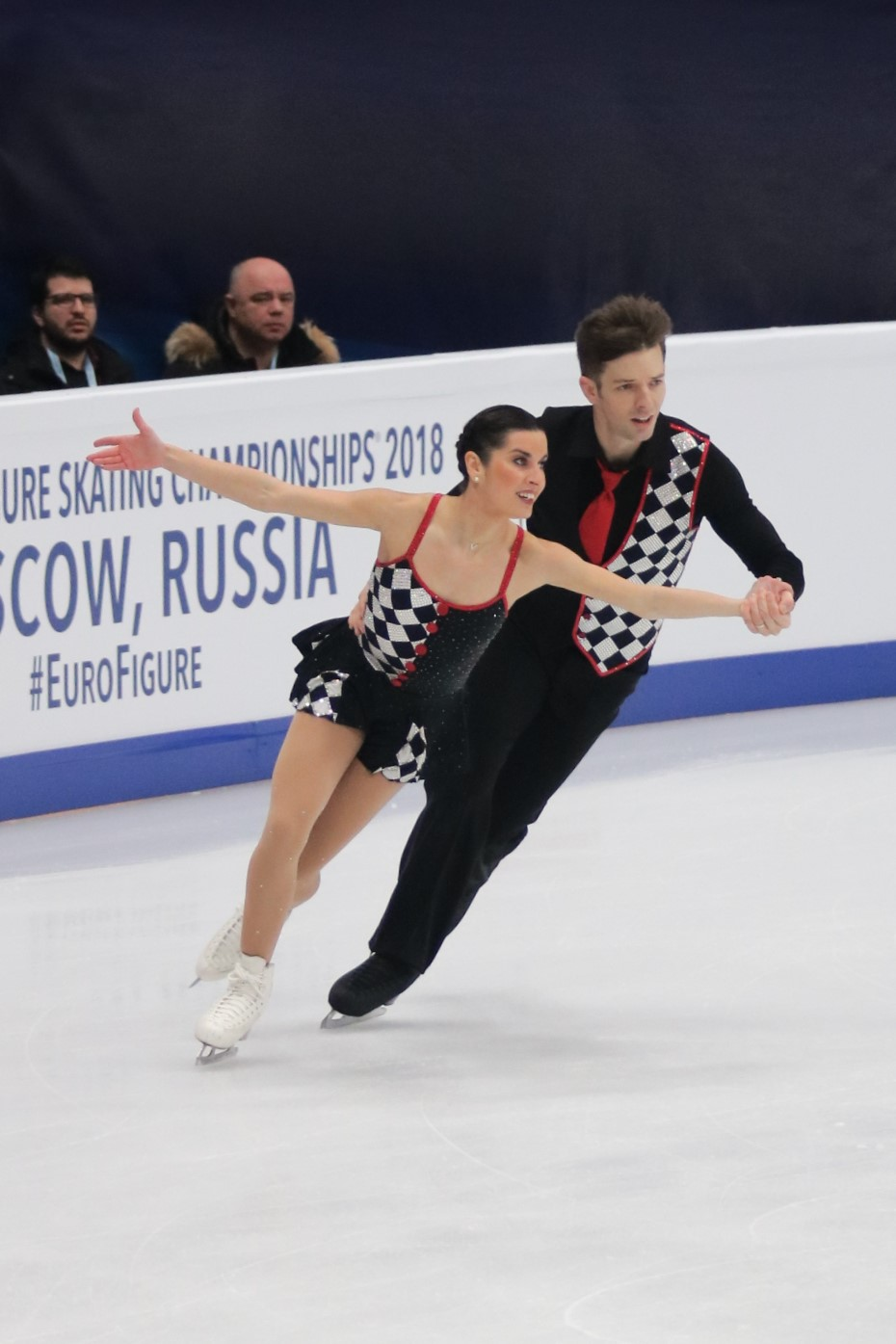
With Hotárek at the 2018 European Championships

International
Event	2014–15	2015–16	2016–17	2017–18
Olympics				6th
World Champ.	11th	14th	9th	10th
European Champ.	4th	5th	6th	5th
GP Cup of China				5th
GP Rostelecom Cup		6th	4th	4th
GP Skate America			8th	
CS Golden Spin	2nd			
CS Lombardia Trophy			2nd	3rd
CS Warsaw Cup	3rd	WD	1st	1st
Lombardia Trophy		1st		
Seibt Memorial		1st		
National
Italian Champ.	1st	2nd	2nd	
Team events
Olympics				4th T

=== Single skating ===
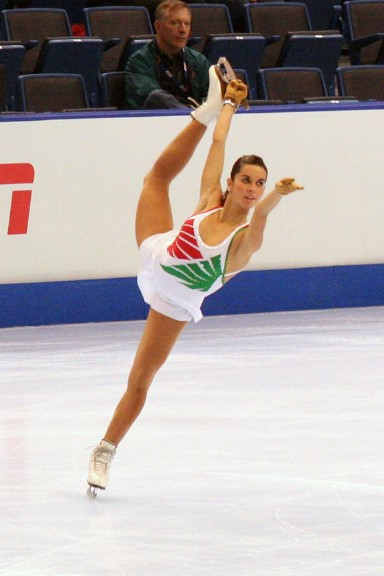
Marchei at the 2006 Skate America

International
Event	01–02	02–03	03–04	04–05	05–06	06–07	07–08	08–09	09–10	10–11	11–12	12–13	13–14
Olympics													11th
Worlds			23rd		23rd	11th	13th				8th	18th	16th
Europeans			15th	31st	19th	5th	6th		8th	10th	8th	4th	6th
GP Bompard				10th		6th	9th						
GP Cup of China											9th		
GP NHK Trophy				11th									6th
GP Rostelecom										5th		9th	
GP Skate America						9th	10th	WD			9th	4th	7th
GP Skate Canada										8th			
Challenge Cup											2nd		
Cup of Nice									2nd	2nd			
Denkova-Staviski												1st	
Finlandia Trophy							12th		8th				
Golden Spin			7th		6th								
Ice Challenge									2nd				
Lombardia Trophy													1st
Merano Cup			2nd	2nd	2nd		1st	1st	3rd				
NRW Trophy									1st				
Nepela Memorial										2nd			
Schäfer Memorial						4th							
Universiade						2nd							2nd
International: Junior
Junior Worlds			14th	16th									
JGP Bulgaria			9th										
JGP Czech Rep.	12th												
JGP Germany		13th											
JGP Japan			6th										
JGP Netherlands	6th												
JGP Serbia		6th											
Gardena	5th J												
National
Italian Champ.			1st	2nd		3rd	1st	4th	1st	2nd	1st	2nd	1st
Team events
Olympics													4th T
World Team; Trophy											6th T 8th P		

== Detailed results ==
Current personal best scores are highlighted in bold.

=== With Hotárek ===
2017–18 season
Date	Event	SP	FS	Total
19–25 March 2018	2018 World Championships	8; 71.37	8; 130.65	10; 202.02
14–15 February 2018	2018 Winter Olympics	7; **74.50**	6; **142.09**	6; **216.59**
8–12 February 2018	2018 Winter Olympics (Team event)		2; 138.44	
15–21 January 2017	2018 European Championships	4; 71.89	5; 132.31	5; 204.20
13–16 December 2015	2018 Italian Championships	1; 71.64	2; 107.15	2; 178.79
16–19 November 2017	2017 CS Warsaw Cup	1; 66.70	1; 126.44	1; 193.14
3–5 November 2017	2017 Cup of China	5; 59.53	4; 128.48	5; 188.01
20–22 October 2017	2017 Rostelecom Cup	3; 68.48	4; 125.15	4; 193.63
14–17 September 2017	2017 CS Lombardia Trophy	3; 61.32	3; 119.54	3; 180.86
2016–17 season
Date	Event	SP	FS	Total
29 March – 2 April 2017	2017 World Championships	9; 71.04	9; 132.88	9; 203.92
25–29 January 2017	2017 European Championships	6; 66.53	6; 125.40	6; 191.93
14–17 December 2016	2017 Italian Championships	2; 66.04	1; 127.34	2; 193.38
17–20 November 2016	2016 CS Warsaw Cup	1; 67.04	1; 122.22	1; 189.26
4–6 November 2016	2016 Rostelecom Cup	3; 66.82	5; 120.79	4; 187.61
21–23 October 2016	2016 Skate America	6; 62.49	8; 107.20	8; 169.69
8–11 September 2016	2016 CS Lombardia Trophy	1; 59.40	2; 120.16	2; 179.56
2015–16 season
Date	Event	SP	FS	Total
28 March – 3 April 2016	2016 World Championships	13; 59.76	15; 110.97	14; 170.73
23–27 February 2016	2016 Hellmut Seibt Memorial	1; 57.78	1; 122.42	1; 180.20
25–31 January 2016	2016 European Championships	8; 58.47	4; 124.14	5; 182.61
16–19 December 2015	2016 Italian Championships	2; 63.74	1; 118.88	2; 184.28
20–22 November 2015	2015 Rostelecom Cup	4; 62.43	6; 115.76	6; 178.19
20–22 November 2015	2015 Skate Canada International	6; 54.00	WD	WD
17–20 September 2015	2015 Lombardia Trophy	1; 63.85	1; 113.57	1; 179.56
2014–15 season
Date	Event	SP	FS	Total
23–29 March 2015	2015 World Championships	9; 60.56	11; 111.99	11; 172.55
16 January – 1 February 2015	2015 European Championships	4; 57.95	4; 117.44	4; 175.39
20–21 December 2014	2015 Italian Championships	1; 58.44	1; 115.32	1; 173.76
4–6 December 2014	2014 CS Golden Spin of Zagreb	2; 55.18	2; 112.00	2; 167.18
21–24 November 2014	2014 CS Warsaw Cup	4; 52.32	3; 102.28	3; 154.60
