= Ondřej Hotárek =

Czech-Italian pair skater and coach

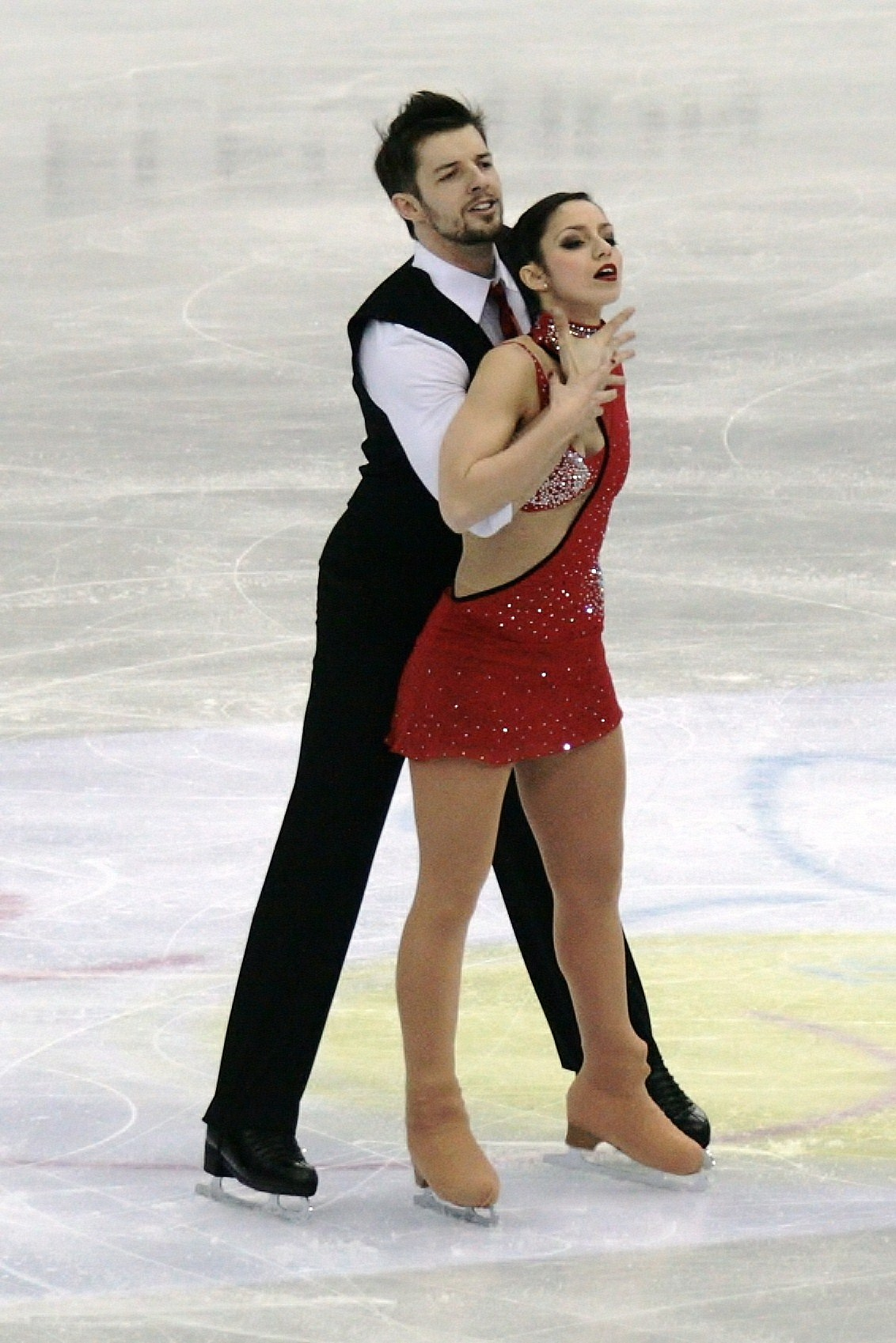
- Hotárek with Berton in 2012

Personal information
- Born: 25 January 1984 (age 42) Brno, Czechoslovakia
- Height: 1.81 m (5 ft 11 in)

Figure skating career
- Country: Italy
- Partner: Valentina Marchei
- Coach: Franca Bianconi, Bruno Marcotte, Richard Gauthier
- Skating club: Fiamme Azzurre
- Began skating: 1989

Medal record
European Championships
Bronze medal – third place	2013 Zagreb	Pairs
Italian Championships
Gold medal – first place	2007 Trento	Pairs
Gold medal – first place	2008 Milan	Pairs
Gold medal – first place	2011 Milan	Pairs
Gold medal – first place	2012 Courmayeur	Pairs
Gold medal – first place	2013 Milan	Pairs
Gold medal – first place	2014 Merano	Pairs
Gold medal – first place	2015 Turin	Pairs
Silver medal – second place	2010 Brescia	Pairs
Silver medal – second place	2016 Turin	Pairs
Silver medal – second place	2017 Egna	Pairs
Silver medal – second place	2018 Milan	Pairs
Bronze medal – third place	2009 Brescia	Pairs

Ondřej Hotárek (born 25 January 1984) is a Czech-Italian pair skater and coach who began competing for Italy in 2006. He competed with Valentina Marchei until the end of their partnership in 2018. With former partner Stefania Berton, he is the 2013 European bronze medalist, the 2013 Skate Canada International champion, and a three-time Italian national champion. Berton/Hotárek are the first Italian pair skaters to win European and Grand Prix medals.

Earlier in his career, Hotárek competed as a single skater and pair skater for the Czech Republic.

== Personal life ==
Ondřej Hotárek was born 25 January 1984 in Brno, Czechoslovakia. He moved from the Czech Republic to Italy in 2005 and became an Italian citizen in September 2010. In January 2012, he became a member of the sports group of the Italian police.

Hotárek's engagement to his girlfriend, Italian ice dancer Anna Cappellini, was announced in August 2014. The couple married on June 20, 2015, in Breccia, Italy. Figure skater Michal Březina was the best man at their wedding.

On July 2, 2021, Hotárek and Cappellini's first child was born.

== Early career ==
Hotárek began learning to skate in 1989. He competed in men's singles for the Czech Republic. He became the 2003 and 2004 Czech national bronze medalist and appeared in international events.

Hotárek found the jump elements difficult, and believed his skill set would be better suited to pair skating. His first partner was Veronika Havlíčková. In January 2006, he teamed up with Laura Magitteri to compete for Italy. They were the 2007 and 2008 Italian national champions. Their partnership ended in January 2009.

== Partnership with Berton ==
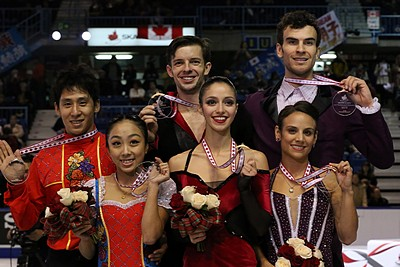
Berton and Hotárek at the Skate Canada podium.

Hotárek teamed up with Stefania Berton in early 2009. They won the silver medal at 2010 Italian Nationals and were selected to compete at the World Championships. They placed 11th in their debut at the event.

During the 2010–11 season, Berton/Hotárek won silver at the Nebelhorn Trophy and also debuted on the Grand Prix circuit, finishing sixth at Cup of Russia. They won their first Italian national title and were sent to the 2011 European Championships. They placed fourth in the short program and fifth in the free program, setting personal bests in both, and finished fifth overall with their best combined total to date, 164.83 points.

Berton/Hotárek began the 2011–12 season at the 2011 Ondrej Nepela Memorial, where they won the silver medal. In the Grand Prix season, they placed 4th at 2011 NHK Trophy and then won bronze at 2011 Rostelecom Cup, making them the first Italian pair to medal on the Grand Prix circuit. At the 2012 European Championships, they placed 4th, historically the highest Italian result in pairs.

In the 2012–13 season, Berton/Hotárek were assigned to the 2012 Skate Canada International and 2012 Trophée Eric Bompard. After taking bronze at both events, they won bronze at the 2013 European Championships, becoming the first Italian pair skaters to medal at Europeans.

Berton/Hotárek started the 2013–14 Grand Prix season at the 2013 Skate America and finished 5th. They won their first GP title at the 2013 Skate Canada and then finished 4th at the 2014 European Championships, behind Vera Bazarova / Yuri Larionov. Berton/Hotárek finished 11th in the pairs event at the 2014 Winter Olympics in Sochi, Russia.

For the 2014–15 season, Berton/Hotarek were assigned to 2014 Skate America and the 2014 Rostelecom Cup. On 2 July 2014, La Gazzetta dello Sport reported that their partnership had ended.

== Partnership with Marchei ==
On 2 July 2014, La Gazzetta dello Sport wrote that Hotárek and Valentina Marchei, a single skater, were considering a partnership. Bruno Marcotte confirmed on 26 July 2014 that the two were training together. They are coached by Marcotte in Montreal and by Franca Bianconi in Milan.

=== 2014–15 season ===
Marchei/Hotárek began the season by winning the bronze medal at the 2014 CS Warsaw Cup as well as the silver medal at the 2014 CS Golden Spin of Zagreb. They then went on to win the 2015 Italian Championships.

Selected to compete at the European Championships in Stockholm, Sweden, Marchei/Hotárek finished fourth.

At the World Championships in Shanghai, China, they finished eleventh.

=== 2015–16 season ===
Marchei/Hotárek started the season by winning gold at the 2015 Lombardia Trophy.

Debuting on the Grand Prix series, Marchei/Hotárek competed in the short program at 2015 Skate Canada International but withdrew on the day of the free skate due to Hotárek sustaining a concussion while practicing a triple twist. They went on to compete at the 2015 Rostelecom Cup, finishing sixth.

At the Italian Figure Skating Championships, Marchei/Hotárek won the silver medal behind Nicole Della Monica / Matteo Guarise.

Going on to compete at the 2016 European Championships in Bratislava, Slovakia, Marchei/Hotárek finished fifth. They went on to compete at the 2015 Hellmut Seibt Memorial, where they won the gold medal.

At the 2016 World Figure Skating Championships in Boston, Massachusetts, Marchei/Hotárek finished fourteenth.

=== 2016–17 season ===
Marchei/Hotárek began the season by winning the silver medal at the 2016 CS Lombardia Trophy.

They then competed on the Grand Prix series, finishing eighth at 2016 Skate America and fourth at the 2016 Rostelecom Cup. They went on to also win the gold medal at the 2016 CS Warsaw Cup.

At the 2017 Italian Championships, Marchei/Hotárek won the silver medal for the second consecutive year.

Selected to compete at the 2017 European Championships in Ostrava, Czech Republic, Marchei/Hotárek finished sixth.

Competing at the 2017 World Championships in Helsinki, Finland, Marchei/Hotárek placed ninth.

=== 2017–18 season ===
Marchei/Hotárek began the season with winning the bronze medal at the 2017 CS Lombardia Trophy.

They then competed on the 2017–18 Grand Prix series, finishing fifth at the 2017 Cup of China and fourth at the 2017 Rostelecom Cup. They also won the gold medal at the 2017 CS Warsaw Cup.

At the 2018 Italian Championships, Marchei/Hotárek won the silver medal for the third year in a row.

Competing at the 2018 European Championships in Moscow, Russia, Marchei/Hotárek finished fifth.

Selected to compete at the 2018 Winter Olympics in both the Team and Pair events, Marchei/Hotárek placed second in the free program segment of the team event, helping Team Italy finish in fourth place overall. In the pairs event, Marchei/Hotárek placed seventh in the short program and sixth in the free skate, finishing in sixth place overall.

At the 2018 World Championships in Milan, Italy, Marchei/Hotárek finished in tenth place.

They ended their partnership in September 2018.

== Post-competitive career ==
Following his retirement from competitive figure skating, Hotárek became a figure skating coach and currently coaches in Bergamo at the S.S.D. S.r.l. Icelab alongside his former coach, Franca Bianconi.

His current and former students include:

- (Italy) Rebecca Ghilardi / Filippo Ambrosini
- (Germany) Annika Hocke / Robert Kunkel
- (Czech Republic) Barbora Kuciánová / Martin Bidař
- (Italy) Matteo Rizzo
- (United Kingdom) Kristen Spours
- (Finland) Milania Väänänen / Filippo Clerici
- (Czech Republic) Anna Valesi / Martin Bidař
- (Italy) Anna Valesi / Manuel Piazza

== Programs ==
=== With Marchei ===
Season	Short program	Free skating	Exhibition
2017–18	Tu vuò fà l'americano by Renato Carosone	Amarcord by Nino Rota	Barbie Girl by Aqua
2016–17	Seven Nation Army by The White Stripes	Skyfall (James Bond soundtrack) performed by Adele; Mission: Impossible – Rogue Nation (soundtrack)	Yesterday Performed by Michael Bolton
2015–16	Morir d'amor by Marianna Cataldi	The Way We Were by Marvin Hamlisch; Saturday Night Fever by Barry Gibb, Maurice Gibb, Robin Gibb, David Shire	
2014–15	Malagueña by Ernesto Lecuona choreo. by Massimo Scali	La Strada by Nino Rota choreo. by Corrado Giordani, Franca Bianconi	All of Me by John Legend

=== With Berton ===
Season	Short program	Free skating	Exhibition
2013–14	The Mask by Randy Edelman	Dracula by Philip Glass	Nessun dorma by Luciano Pavarotti
2012–13	Paint It Black by The Rolling Stones	Poeta en el viento by Vicente Amigo	Dirty Dancing
2011–12	Harlem Nocturne by Earle Hagen, Dick Rogers; Demasiado Corazon by Willy DeVille choreo. by Pasquale Camerlengo	Adagio in G minor for Organ and Strings by Remo Giazotto, Tomaso Albinoni choreo. by Anjelika Krylova	Caruso by Lucio Dalla, Luciano Pavarotti
2010–11	Invierno Porteno by Astor Piazzolla	Romeo and Juliet (1968 film) by Nino Rota	Unchained Melody by The Righteous Brothers
2009–10	Caos Calmo by Buonvino	Notre Dame de Paris (1999 TV movie) by Riccardo Cocciante	Romeo and Juliet (1968 film) by Nino Rota

=== Single skating ===
Season	Short program	Free skating
2001–02	The Pink Panther Theme by Henry Mancini	La Dolce Vita by Nino Rota The City of Prague Philharmonic

== Competitive highlights ==
GP: Grand Prix; CS: Challenger Series; JGP: Junior Grand Prix

=== Pairs with Marchei for Italy ===
International
Event	2014–15	2015–16	2016–17	2017–18
Olympics				6th
World Champ.	11th	14th	9th	10th
European Champ.	4th	5th	6th	5th
GP Cup of China				5th
GP Rostelecom Cup		6th	4th	4th
GP Skate America			8th	
GP Skate Canada		WD		
CS Golden Spin	2nd			
CS Lombardia Trophy			2nd	3rd
CS Warsaw Cup	3rd	WD	1st	1st
Lombardia Trophy		1st		
Seibt Memorial		1st		
National
Italian Champ.	1st	2nd	2nd	2nd
Team events
Olympics				4th T

=== Pairs with Berton for Italy ===
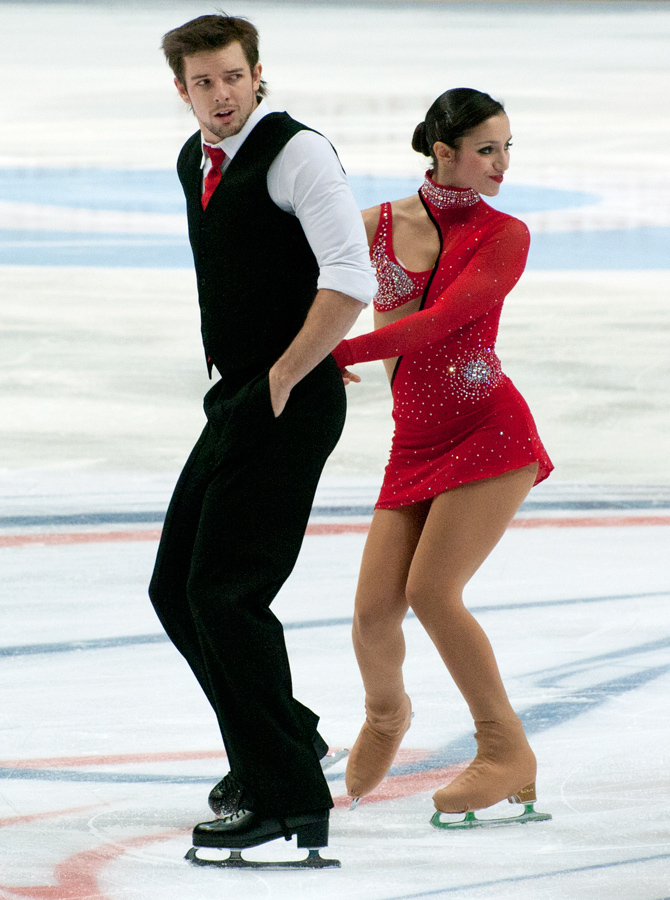
Berton/Hotárek at the 2011 Rostelecom Cup.

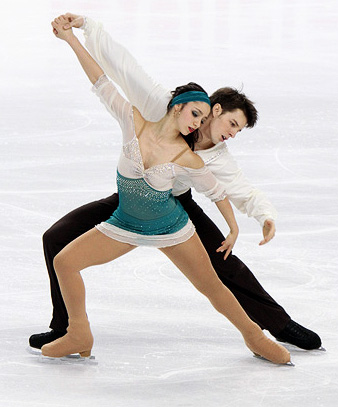
Berton/Hotárek at the 2010 World Championships.

International
Event	09–10	10–11	11–12	12–13	13–14
Olympics					11th
Worlds	11th	10th	11th	10th	9th
Europeans		5th	4th	3rd	4th
GP Bompard				3rd	
GP NHK Trophy			4th		
GP Rostelecom		6th	3rd		
GP Skate America					5th
GP Skate Canada				3rd	1st
Cup of Nice			1st		
Ice Challenge	3rd				
Lombardia Trophy					1st
Nebelhorn Trophy		2nd			
Nepela Memorial			2nd	2nd	
NRW Trophy	2nd	1st		2nd	
National
Italian Champ.	2nd	1st	1st	1st	1st
Team events
Olympics					4th T

=== Pairs with Magitteri for Italy ===
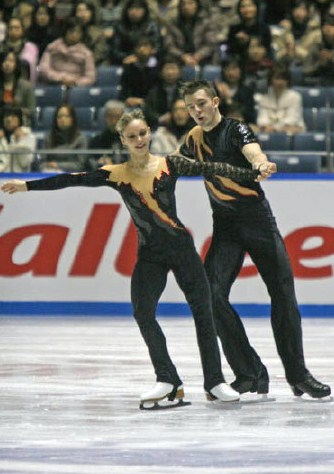
Magitteri/Hotárek in 2008

International
Event	2006–07	2007–08	2008–09
World Champ.	16th	13th	
European Champ.	9th	11th	
GP Cup of Russia		8th	
GP NHK Trophy			6th
GP Skate America		6th	
Cup of Nice	3rd		
Nebelhorn Trophy		WD	9th
National
Italian Champ.	1st	1st	3rd

=== Men's singles for the Czech Republic ===
International
Event	98–99	99–00	00–01	01–02	02–03	03–04
Nepela Memorial					6th	
Grand Prize SNP				5th		
International: Junior
JGP Czech Rep.				12th		
JGP Italy				15th		
JGP Serbia					13th	
EYOF					7th	
Grand Prize SNP			3rd J			
National
Czech				4th	3rd	3rd
Czech Junior	4th	3rd	3rd	3rd	2nd	

== Detailed results ==
Current personal best scores are highlighted in bold.

=== With Marchei ===
2017–18 season
Date	Event	SP	FS	Total
March 19–25, 2018	2018 World Championships	8; 71.37	8; 130.65	10; 202.02
February 14–15, 2018	2018 Winter Olympics	7; **74.50**	6; **142.09**	6; **216.59**
February 8–12, 2018	2018 Winter Olympics (Team event)	\	2; 138.44	\
January 15–21, 2017	2018 European Championships	4; 71.89	5; 132.31	5; 204.20
December 13–16, 2015	2018 Italian Championships	1; 71.64	2; 107.15	2; 178.79
November 16–19, 2017	2017 CS Warsaw Cup	1; 66.70	1; 126.44	1; 193.14
November 3–5, 2017	2017 Cup of China	5; 59.53	4; 128.48	5; 188.01
October 20–22, 2017	2017 Rostelecom Cup	3; 68.48	4; 125.15	4; 193.63
September 14–17, 2017	2017 CS Lombardia Trophy	3; 61.32	3; 119.54	3; 180.86
2016–17 season
Date	Event	SP	FS	Total
March 29–April 2, 2017	2017 World Championships	9; 71.04	9; 132.88	9; 203.92
January 25–29, 2017	2017 European Championships	6; 66.53	6; 125.40	6; 191.93
December 14–17, 2016	2017 Italian Championships	2; 66.04	1; 127.34	2; 193.38
November 17–20, 2016	2016 CS Warsaw Cup	1; 67.04	1; 122.22	1; 189.26
November 4–6, 2016	2016 Rostelecom Cup	3; 66.82	5; 120.79	4; 187.61
October 21–23, 2016	2016 Skate America	6; 62.49	8; 107.20	8; 169.69
September 8–11, 2016	2016 CS Lombardia Trophy	1; 59.40	2; 120.16	2; 179.56
2015–16 season
Date	Event	SP	FS	Total
March 28–April 3, 2016	2016 World Championships	13; 59.76	15; 110.97	14; 170.73
February 23–27, 2016	2016 Hellmut Seibt Memorial	1; 57.78	1; 122.42	1; 180.20
January 25–31, 2016	2016 European Championships	8; 58.47	4; 124.14	5; 182.61
December 16–19, 2015	2016 Italian Championships	2; 63.74	1; 118.88	2; 184.28
November 20–22, 2015	2015 Rostelecom Cup	4; 62.43	6; 115.76	6; 178.19
November 20–22, 2015	2015 Skate Canada International	6; 54.00	WD	WD
September 17–20, 2015	2015 Lombardia Trophy	1; 63.85	1; 113.57	1; 179.56
2014–15 season
Date	Event	SP	FS	Total
March 23–29, 2015	2015 World Championships	9; 60.56	11; 111.99	11; 172.55
January 16–February 1, 2015	2015 European Championships	4; 57.95	4; 117.44	4; 175.39
December 20–21, 2014	2015 Italian Championships	1; 58.44	1; 115.32	1; 173.76
December 4–6, 2014	2014 CS Golden Spin of Zagreb	2; 55.18	2; 112.00	2; 167.18
November 21–24, 2014	2014 CS Warsaw Cup	4; 52.32	3; 102.28	3; 154.60
