= 2013 Skate Canada International =

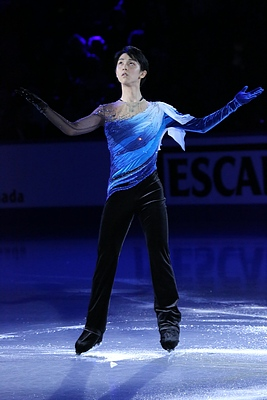
- Yuzuru Hanyu in the 2013 Skate Canada International Figure Skating Competition.
- Type: Grand Prix
- Date: October 24 – 27
- Season: 2013–14
- Location: Saint John, New Brunswick
- Host: Skate Canada
- Venue: Harbour Station

Champions
- Men's singles: (Canada) Patrick Chan
- Ladies' singles: (Russia) Yulia Lipnitskaya
- Pairs: (Italy) Stefania Berton / Ondrej Hotarek
- Ice dance: (Canada) Tessa Virtue / Scott Moir
- Previous: 2012 Skate Canada International
- Next: 2014 Skate Canada International
- Previous Grand Prix: 2013 Skate America
- Next Grand Prix: 2013 Cup of China

The 2013 Skate Canada International was the second event of six in the 2013–14 ISU Grand Prix of Figure Skating, a senior-level international invitational competition series. It was held at the Harbour Station in Saint John, New Brunswick on October 24–27. Medals were awarded in the disciplines of men's singles, ladies' singles, pair skating, and ice dancing. Skaters earned points toward qualifying for the 2013–14 Grand Prix Final.

== Eligibility ==
Skaters who reached the age of 14 by July 1, 2013 were eligible to compete on the 2013 senior Grand Prix circuit.

== Entries ==
The entries were as follows.

Country	Men	Ladies	Pairs	Ice dancing
Canada	Patrick Chan; Andrei Rogozine; Elladj Balde	Amelie Lacoste; Kaetlyn Osmond; Veronik Mallet	Meagan Duhamel / Eric Radford; Paige Lawrence / Rudi Swiegers; Margaret Purdy / Michael Marinaro	Alexandra Paul / Mitchell Islam; Kaitlyn Weaver / Andrew Poje; Tessa Virtue / Scott Moir
China			Sui Wenjing / Han Cong	
Czech Republic	Michal Březina			
Germany			Mari Vartmann / Aaron Van Cleave	Nelli Zhiganshina / Alexander Gazsi
Italy			Stefania Berton / Ondřej Hotárek	Charlene Guignard / Marco Fabbri
Japan	Takahito Mura; Nobunari Oda; Yuzuru Hanyu	Akiko Suzuki		
Russia		Yulia Lipnitskaya		Ekaterina Riazanova / Ilia Tkachenko; Alexandra Stepanova / Ivan Bukin
Ukraine		Natalia Popova		
United States	Ross Miner; Jeremy Abbott; Joshua Farris	Gracie Gold; Christina Gao; Courtney Hicks	Lindsay Davis / Rockne Brubaker; Haven Denney / Brandon Frazier	Madison Hubbell / Zachary Donohue

=== Changes to initial lineup ===
On September 26, 2013, it was reported that Yuna Kim withdrew because of a foot injury. Courtney Hicks was named to replace her. Kiira Korpi also withdrew and was replaced by Natalia Popova. Yuko Kavaguti and Alexander Smirnov withdrew due to an injury to Smirnov. They were replaced by Haven Denney and Brandon Frazier. Alena Leonova withdrew due to a leg injury. No replacement was announced.

== Results ==
=== Men ===
Rank	Name	Nation	Total points	SP		FS	
1	Patrick Chan	Canada	262.03	1	88.10	1	173.93
2	Yuzuru Hanyu	Japan	234.80	3	80.40	2	154.40
3	Nobunari Oda	Japan	233.00	2	80.82	3	152.18
4	Michal Březina	Czech Republic	218.32	7	71.71	5	146.61
5	Joshua Farris	United States	216.72	8	69.14	4	147.58
6	Jeremy Abbott	United States	215.95	4	74.58	6	141.37
7	Elladj Baldé	Canada	205.19	6	72.35	7	132.84
8	Andrei Rogozine	Canada	197.35	9	68.31	9	129.04
9	Ross Miner	United States	196.89	10	66.71	8	130.18
10	Takahito Mura	Japan	188.53	5	73.08	10	115.45

=== Ladies ===
Rank	Name	Nation	Total points	SP		FS	
1	Yulia Lipnitskaya	Russia	198.23	2	66.89	1	131.34
2	Akiko Suzuki	Japan	193.75	3	65.76	2	127.99
3	Gracie Gold	United States	186.75	1	69.45	3	117.20
4	Christina Gao	United States	173.69	4	62.82	5	110.87
5	Amelie Lacoste	Canada	163.11	6	59.13	6	103.98
6	Courtney Hicks	United States	162.00	9	50.70	4	111.30
7	Natalia Popova	Ukraine	149.59	7	52.36	7	93.52
8	Veronik Mallet	Canada	138.13	8	50.71	8	87.42
WD	Kaetlyn Osmond	Canada	60.32	5	60.32		

=== Pairs ===
Rank	Name	Nation	Total points	SP		FS	
1	Stefania Berton / Ondřej Hotárek	Italy	193.92	2	69.38	2	124.54
2	Sui Wenjing / Han Cong	China	193.77	3	69.02	1	124.75
3	Meagan Duhamel / Eric Radford	Canada	190.62	1	69.57	3	121.05
4	Paige Lawrence / Rudi Swiegers	Canada	159.82	6	52.94	4	106.88
5	Haven Denney / Brandon Frazier	United States	158.83	5	55.01	5	103.82
6	Lindsay Davis / Rockne Brubaker	United States	153.71	7	52.69	6	101.02
7	Mari Vartmann / Aaron Van Cleave	Germany	149.59	4	55.08	7	94.51
8	Margaret Purdy / Michael Marinaro	Canada	131.39	8	39.50	8	91.89

=== Ice dancing ===
Rank	Name	Nation	Total points	SD		FD	
1	Tessa Virtue / Scott Moir	Canada	181.03	1	73.15	1	107.88
2	Kaitlyn Weaver / Andrew Poje	Canada	175.23	2	70.35	2	104.88
3	Madison Hubbell / Zachary Donohue	United States	153.20	3	60.92	3	92.28
4	Ekaterina Riazanova / Ilia Tkachenko	Russia	145.56	4	59.79	5	85.77
5	Alexandra Paul / Mitchell Islam	Canada	143.77	7	53.74	4	90.03
6	Nelli Zhiganshina / Alexander Gazsi	Germany	138.16	5	55.19	6	82.25
7	Charlène Guignard / Marco Fabbri	Italy	134.28	8	52.03	7	82.25
8	Alexandra Stepanova / Ivan Bukin	Russia	133.12	6	55.63	8	77.49
