= 2013–14 figure skating season =

- Date: July 1, 2013 – June 30, 2014
- Previous: 2012–13
- Next: 2014–15

The 2013–14 figure skating season began on July 1, 2013, and ended on June 30, 2014. During this season, elite skaters competed at the 2014 European Championships, Four Continents Championships, World Junior Championships, and World Championships, as well as the 2014 Winter Olympics. They also competed at elite events such as the Grand Prix series and Junior Grand Prix series, culminating at the Grand Prix Final.

== Age eligibility ==
Skaters were eligible to compete in International Skating Union (ISU) events at the junior or senior levels according to their age. These rules may not have applied to non-ISU events such as national championships.

Level	Date of birth
Junior (females in all disciplines; males in singles)	Born between July 1, 1994 & June 30, 2000
Junior (males in pairs & ice dance)	Born between July 1, 1992 & June 30, 2000
Senior (all disciplines)	Born before July 1, 1998

== Changes ==
If skaters of different nationalities formed a team, the ISU required that they choose one country to represent. The date provided is the date when the change occurred or, if not available, the date when the change was announced.

=== Partnership changes ===
Date	Skaters	Disc.	Type	Ref.
May 2013	(United Kingdom) Caitlin Yankowskas / Hamish Gaman	Pairs	Formed	
May 2013	(Austria) Stina Martini / Severin Kiefer	Pairs	Split	
May 2013	(Austria) Miriam Ziegler / Severin Kiefer	Pairs	Formed	
May 2013	(Czech Republic) Cortney Mansour / Michal Češka	Ice dance	Formed	
May 2013	(Uzbekistan) Anna Nagornyuk / Viktor Kovalenko	Ice dance	Split	
May 2013	(Uzbekistan) Elizaveta Tretiakova / Viktor Kovalenko	Ice dance	Formed	
May 2013	(Kazakhstan) Ksenia Korobkova / Daryn Zhunussov	Ice dance	Formed	
May 2013	(Finland) Cecilia Törn / Jussiville Partanen	Ice dance	Formed	
May 2013	(Israel) Danielle Montalbano / Evgeni Krasnopolski	Pairs	Split	
May 2013	(Israel) Andrea Davidovich / Evgeni Krasnopolski	Pairs	Formed	
October 1, 2013	(Italy) Sofia Sforza / Francesco Fioretti	Ice dance	Split	
October 1, 2013	(Italy) Sofia Sforza / Leo Luca Sforza	Ice dance	Formed	
October 12, 2013	(Italy) Giulia Foresti / Luca Demattè	Pairs	Formed	
October 17, 2013	(Canada) Brittany Jones / Joshua Reagan	Pairs	Formed	
January 2014	(Russia) Anastasia Martiusheva / Alexei Rogonov	Pairs	Split	
March 9, 2014	(Israel) Andrea Davidovich / Evgeni Krasnopolski	Pairs	Split	
March 29, 2014	(France) Daria Popova / Bruno Massot	Pairs	Split	
March 29, 2014	(Germany) Aliona Savchenko / Robin Szolkowy	Pairs	Split	
March 29, 2014	(Germany) Aliona Savchenko / Bruno Massot	Pairs	Formed	
March 31, 2014	(Russia) Vera Bazarova / Yuri Larionov	Pairs	Split	
March 31, 2014	(Ukraine) Siobhan Heekin-Canedy / Dmitri Dun	Ice dance	Split	
April 6, 2014	(Estonia) Natalja Zabijako / Alexandr Zaboev	Pairs	Split	
April 6, 2014	(Russia) Natalja Zabijako / Yuri Larionov	Pairs	Formed	
April 7, 2014	(Russia) Elena Ilinykh / Nikita Katsalapov	Ice dance	Split	
April 7, 2014	(Russia) Victoria Sinitsina / Ruslan Zhiganshin	Ice dance	Split	
April 7, 2014	(Russia) Elena Ilinykh / Ruslan Zhiganshin	Ice dance	Formed	
April 7, 2014	(Russia) Victoria Sinitsina / Nikita Katsalapov	Ice dance	Formed	
April 9, 2014	(Russia) Vasilisa Davankova / Andrei Deputat	Pairs	Split	
April 9, 2014	(Russia) Vera Bazarova / Andrei Deputat	Pairs	Formed	
April 24, 2014	(Italy) Lorenza Alessandrini / Simone Vaturi	Ice dance	Split	
April 24, 2014	(Russia) Ekaterina Riazanova / Ilia Tkachenko	Ice dance	Split	
April 30, 2014	(Russia) Vasilisa Davankova / Alexander Enbert	Ice dance	Formed	
April 30, 2014	(Canada) Kirsten Moore-Towers / Dylan Moscovitch	Pairs	Split	
April/May 2014	(Russia) Kamilla Gainetdinova / Ivan Bich	Pairs	Split	
May 1, 2014	(Switzerland) Ramona Elsener / Florian Roost	Ice dance	Split	
May 2, 2014	(Lithuania) Isabella Tobias / Deividas Stagniūnas	Ice dance	Split	
May 7, 2014	(United States) Marissa Castelli / Simon Shnapir	Pairs	Split	
May 8, 2014	(Canada) Paige Lawrence / Rudi Swiegers	Pairs	Split	
May 12, 2014	(Canada) Kharis Ralph / Asher Hill	Ice dance	Split	
May 27, 2014	(Canada) Margaret Purdy / Michael Marinaro	Pairs	Split	
May 28, 2014	(United States) DeeDee Leng / Simon Shnapir	Pairs	Formed	
June 3, 2014	(Canada) Lubov Iliushechkina / Dylan Moscovitch	Pairs	Formed	
June 3, 2014	(Canada) Kirsten Moore-Towers / Michael Marinaro	Pairs	Formed	
June 9, 2014	(Russia) Kristina Astakhova / Alexei Rogonov	Pairs	Formed	
June 10, 2014	(Canada) Natasha Purich / Mervin Tran	Pairs	Split	
June 10, 2014	(United States) Marissa Castelli / Mervin Tran	Pairs	Formed	
June 18, 2014	(Germany) Tanja Kolbe / Stefano Caruso	Ice dance	Split	

=== Retirements ===
Date	Skater(s)	Disc.	Ref.
October 23, 2013	(United States) Johnny Weir	Men	
December 23, 2013	(Japan) Miki Ando	Women	
December 24, 2013	(Japan) Nobunari Oda	Men	
January 12, 2014	(United States) Rachael Flatt	Women	
February 13, 2014	(Russia) Evgeni Plushenko	Men	
February 14, 2014	(China) Pang Qing / Tong Jian	Pairs	
February 14, 2014	(France) Brian Joubert	Men	
February 19, 2014	(Russia) Ksenia Makarova	Women	
February 20, 2014	(South Korea) Kim Yuna	Women	
March 20, 2014	(Italy) Paul Bonifacio Parkinson	Men	
March 27, 2014	(Germany) Robin Szolkowy	Pairs	
March 29, 2014	(United Kingdom) Jenna McCorkell	Women	
March 31, 2014	(Ukraine) Dmitri Dun	Ice dance	
April 9, 2014	(Japan) Akiko Suzuki	Women	
April 10, 2014	(United Kingdom) Matthew Parr	Men	
April 11, 2014	(Australia) Danielle O'Brien / Gregory Merriman	Ice dance	
April 24, 2014	(United States) Lynn Kriengkrairut / Logan Giulietti-Schmitt	Ice dance	
May 2, 2014	(Lithuania) Deividas Stagniūnas	Ice dance	
May 12, 2014	(Canada) Kharis Ralph	Ice dance	
May 21, 2014	(Estonia) Jelena Glebova	Women	
May 22, 2014	(Canada) Amelie Lacoste	Women	
May 27, 2014	(Canada) Margaret Purdy	Pairs	
May 27, 2014	(Austria) Viktor Pfeifer	Men	
June 19, 2014	(United States) Alissa Czisny	Women	

=== Coaching changes ===
Date	Skater(s)	Disc.	From	To	Ref.
August 23, 2013	(Finland) Kiira Korpi	Women	Maaret Siromaa & Susanna Haarala	Rafael Arutyunyan, Vera Arutyunyan & Nadia Kanaeva	
September 2013	(United States) Gracie Gold	Women	Alex Ouriashev	Frank Carroll	
October 9, 2013	(United States) Agnes Zawadzki	Women	Christy Krall	Tom Zakrajsek	
October 9, 2013	(Spain) Sonia Lafuente	Women	Ivan Saez & Carolina Sanz	Brian Orser	
February 2014	(United Kingdom) Caitlin Yankowskas / Hamish Gaman	Pairs	Marina Zueva	Bobby Martin & Carrie Wall	
June 10, 2014	(Czech Republic) Michal Březina	Men	Viktor Petrenko	Karel Fajfr	

== Competitions ==
Code key

- S – Senior event
- J – Junior event
- N – Novice event
- M – Men's singles
- L – Ladies' singles
- P – Pair skating
- D – Ice dance

Color key

- Winter Olympics
- ISU Championships
- Grand Prix or Junior Grand Prix
- National championships
- Other competition

2013
Dates	Event	Type	Level	Disc.	Location	Results
August 8–11	Asian Trophy	Other	All	M/L	Bangkok, Thailand	Details
August 20–22	Skate Down Under	Other	All	All	Sydney, Australia	Details
August 29–31	JGP Latvia	Grand Prix	Junior	All	Riga, Latvia	Details
August 31 – September 1	Slovenia Open	Other	Senior	M/L	Celje, Slovenia	Details
September 5–7	JGP Mexico	Grand Prix	Junior	M/L/D	Mexico City, Mexico	Details
September 12–14	JGP Slovakia	Grand Prix	Junior	All	Košice, Slovakia	Details
September 12–14	U.S. International Classic	Other	Senior	All	Salt Lake City, Utah, United States	Details
September 19–21	JGP Poland	Grand Prix	Junior	M/L/D	Gdańsk, Poland	Details
September 19–22	Lombardia Trophy	Other	All	M/L/P	Milan, Italy	Details
September 26–28	JGP Belarus	Grand Prix	Junior	All	Minsk, Belarus	Details
September 26–28	Nebelhorn Trophy	Other	Senior	All	Oberstdorf, Germany	Details
September 28 – October 1	New Zealand Championships	Nationals	All	All	Dunedin, New Zealand	Details
October 3–5	JGP Czech Republic	Grand Prix	Junior	All	Ostrava, Czech Republic	Details
October 3–5	Ondrej Nepela Trophy	Other	Senior	All	Bratislava, Slovakia	Details
October 3–5	Master's de Patinage	Other	S/J	All	Orléans, France	Details
October 4–6	Finlandia Trophy	Other	Senior	All	Espoo, Finland	Details
October 5	Japan Open	Other	Senior	M/L	Saitama, Japan	Details
October 10–12	JGP Estonia	Grand Prix	Junior	All	Tallinn, Estonia	Details
October 17–20	Golden Bear of Zagreb	Other	All	M/L	Zagreb, Croatia	Details
October 18–20	Skate America	Grand Prix	Senior	All	Detroit, Michigan, United States	Details
October 18–20	Ice Star	Other	All	All	Minsk, Belarus	Details
October 23–27	International Cup of Nice	Other	S/J	All	Nice, France	Details
October 24–27	Crystal Skate of Romania	Other	All	M/L	Brașov, Romania	Details
October 24–27	Tirnavia Ice Cup	Other	J/N	M/L	Trnava, Slovakia	Details
October 25–27	Skate Canada International	Grand Prix	Senior	All	Saint John, New Brunswick, Canada	Details
November 1–3	Cup of China	Grand Prix	Senior	All	Beijing, China	Details
November 1–3	NRW Trophy	Other	All	D	Dortmund, Germany	Details
November 7–10	Volvo Open Cup	Other	All	M/L/D	Riga, Latvia	Details
November 8–10	NHK Trophy	Grand Prix	Senior	All	Tokyo, Japan	Details
November 14–17	Skate Celje	Other	J/N	M/L	Celje, Slovenia	Details
November 14–17	Warsaw Cup	Other	All	M/L/P	Warsaw, Poland	Details
November 15–17	Trophée Éric Bompard	Grand Prix	Senior	All	Paris, France	Details
November 15–17	Merano Cup	Other	S/J	M/L/P	Merano, Italy	Details
November 16–17	Pavel Roman Memorial	Other	All	D	Olomouc, Czech Republic	Details
November 20–24	Ice Challenge	Other	All	All	Graz, Austria	Details
November 21–23	Grand Prize SNP	Other	Junior	M/L	Banská Bystrica, Slovakia	Details
November 22–24	Rostelecom Cup	Grand Prix	Senior	All	Moscow, Russia	Details
November 25–30	British Championships	Nationals	All	All	Sheffield, England, United Kingdom	Details
November 28 – December 1	Tallinn Trophy	Other	J/N	M/L/D	Tallinn, Estonia	Details
November 29 – December 1	Denkova-Staviski Cup	Other	All	M/L/P	Sofia, Bulgaria	Details
December 2–6	Australian Championships	Nationals	All	All	Melbourne, Australia	Details
December 2–8	Santa Claus Cup	Other	J/N	M/L/D	Budapest, Hungary	Details
December 4–8	NRW Trophy	Other	All	M/L/P	Dortmund, Germany	Details
December 5–7	Swiss Championships	Nationals	Senior	All	La Chaux-de-Fonds, Switzerland	Details
December 5–8	Grand Prix Final	Grand Prix	S/J	All	Fukuoka, Japan	Details
December 5–8	Golden Spin of Zagreb	Other	Senior	All	Zagreb, Croatia	Details
December 6–8	Danish Championships	Nationals	All	All	Herlev, Denmark	Details
December 6–8	Latvian Championships	Nationals	All	M/L	Jelgava, Latvia	Details
December 7–8	Estonian Championships	Nationals	Senior	M/L	Tallinn, Estonia	Details
December 11–15	Winter Universiade	Other	Senior	All	Trentino, Italy	Details
December 12–15	French Championships	Nationals	Senior	All	Vaujany, France	Details
December 12–15	Swedish Championships	Nationals	S/J	M/L/P	Växjö, Sweden	Details
December 13–15	Finnish Championships	Nationals	S/J	M/L/D	Espoo, Finland	Details
December 14–15	German Championships	Nationals	Senior	All	Berlin, Germany	Details
December 18–21	Ukrainian Open	Other	Senior	All	Kyiv, Ukraine	Details
December 18–21	Austrian Championships	Nationals	S/J	All	Salzburg, Austria	Details 1, 2
December 19–21	Spanish Championships	Nationals	All	All	Jaca, Spain	Details
December 20–21	Italian Championships	Nationals	S/J	All	Merano, Italy	Details
December 20–22	Four Nationals Championships	Nationals	Senior	All	Bratislava, Slovakia	Details
December 21–22	Belarusian Championships	Nationals	Senior	All	Minsk, Belarus	Details
December 21–24	Japan Championships	Nationals	Senior	All	Saitama, Japan	Details
December 24–26	Russian Championships	Nationals	Senior	All	Sochi, Russia	Details
December 28–29	Chinese Championships	Nationals	Senior	All	Changchun, China	Details

2014
Dates	Event	Type	Level	Disc.	Location	Results
January 3–5	South Korean Championships	Nationals	Senior	M/L/D	Koyang, South Korea	Details 1 2 3
January 3–6	New Year's Cup	Other	All	M/L/D	Bratislava, Slovakia	Details
January 5–12	U.S. Championships	Nationals	All	All	Boston, Massachusetts, United States	Details
January 8–11	Mentor Nestlé Nesquik Toruń Cup	Other	Senior	P/D	Toruń, Poland	Details
January 8–11	Mentor Nestlé Nesquik Toruń Cup	Other	J/N	All	Toruń, Poland	Details
January 9–15	Canadian Championships	Nationals	All	All	Ottawa, Ontario, Canada	Details
January 15–19	European Championships	Championships	Senior	All	Budapest, Hungary	Details
January 22–25	Skate Helena	Other	All	M/L	Belgrade, Serbia	Details
January 22–25	Russian Junior Championships	Nationals	Junior	All	Saransk, Russia	Details
January 22–26	Four Continents Championships	Championships	Senior	All	Taipei, Taiwan	Details
January 29 – February 2	Bavarian Open	Other	All	All	Oberstdorf, Germany	Details
February 1–2	Sarajevo Open	Other	Senior	L	Sarajevo, Bosnia and Herzegovina	Details
February 1–2	Sarajevo Open	Other	J/N	M/L	Sarajevo, Bosnia and Herzegovina	Details
February 6–9	Dragon Trophy/Tivoli Cup	Other	All	M/L	Ljubljana, Slovenia	Details, 2
February 6–22	Winter Olympics	Olympics	Senior	All	Sochi, Russia	Details 1 2
February 14–15	Dutch Championships	Nationals	All	M/L	Amsterdam, Netherlands	Details
February 26 – March 1	Hellmut Seibt Memorial	Other	All	M/L/P	Vienna, Austria	Details 1, 2
February 27 – March 2	Nordic Championships	Other	All	M/L	Stockholm, Sweden	Details
March 4–9	Sportland Trophy	Other	Senior	L	Budapest, Hungary	Details
March 4–9	Sportland Trophy	Other	J/N	M/L	Budapest, Hungary	Details
March 5–9	International Challenge Cup	Other	All	M/L/P	The Hague, Netherlands	Details
March 10–16	World Junior Championships	Championships	Junior	All	Sofia, Bulgaria	Details
March 14–16	Coupe du Printemps	Other	All	M/L/P	Kockelscheuer, Luxembourg	Details
March 26–30	World Championships	Championships	Senior	All	Saitama, Japan	Details
March 29–30	Gardena Spring Trophy	Other	All	M/L	Sëlva, Italy	Details
April 3–6	Triglav Trophy	Other	All	M/L	Jesenice, Slovenia	Details
April 5–6	World Development Trophy	Other	J/N	M/L	Gdańsk, Poland	Details
April 21–26	World Development Trophy	Other	J/N	M/L	Mandaluyong, Philippines	Details

== International medalists ==
=== Men's singles ===
Olympics
Competition	Gold	Silver	Bronze	Results
(Russia) Winter Olympics	(Japan) Yuzuru Hanyu	(Canada) Patrick Chan	(Kazakhstan) Denis Ten	

Championships
Competition	Gold	Silver	Bronze	Results
(Hungary) European Championships	(Spain) Javier Fernández	(Russia) Sergei Voronov	(Russia) Konstantin Menshov	
(Taiwan) Four Continents Championships	(Japan) Takahito Mura	(Japan) Takahiko Kozuka	(China) Song Nan	
(Bulgaria) World Junior Championships	(Canada) Nam Nguyen	(Russia) Adian Pitkeev	(United States) Nathan Chen	
(Japan) World Championships	(Japan) Yuzuru Hanyu	(Japan) Tatsuki Machida	(Spain) Javier Fernández	

Grand Prix
Competition	Gold	Silver	Bronze	Results
(United States) Skate America	(Japan) Tatsuki Machida	(United States) Adam Rippon	(United States) Max Aaron	
Skate Canada International	(Canada) Patrick Chan	(Japan) Yuzuru Hanyu	(Japan) Nobunari Oda	
Cup of China	(China) Yan Han	(Russia) Maxim Kovtun	(Japan) Takahiko Kozuka	
(Japan) NHK Trophy	(Japan) Daisuke Takahashi	(Japan) Nobunari Oda	(United States) Jeremy Abbott	
(France) Trophée Éric Bompard	(Canada) Patrick Chan	(Japan) Yuzuru Hanyu	(United States) Jason Brown	
(Russia) Rostelecom Cup	(Japan) Tatsuki Machida	(Russia) Maxim Kovtun	(Spain) Javier Fernández	
(Japan) Grand Prix Final	(Japan) Yuzuru Hanyu	(Canada) Patrick Chan	(Japan) Nobunari Oda	

Junior Grand Prix
Competition	Gold	Silver	Bronze	Results
JGP Latvia	(China) Jin Boyang	(Russia) Adian Pitkeev	(Japan) Shoma Uno	
JGP Mexico	(United States) Nathan Chen	(Japan) Ryuju Hino	(Israel) Daniel Samohin	
JGP Slovakia	(Japan) Keiji Tanaka	(China) Zhang He	(Russia) Mikhail Kolyada	
JGP Poland	(Russia) Adian Pitkeev	(Russia) Alexander Petrov	(China) Zhang He	
JGP Belarus	(United States) Nathan Chen	(Japan) Ryuju Hino	(Russia) Murad Kurbanov	
JGP Czech Republic	(Japan) Keiji Tanaka	(Russia) Alexander Petrov	(Russia) Moris Kvitelashvili	
JGP Estonia	(China) Jin Boyang	(Russia) Mikhail Kolyada	(Philippines) Michael Christian Martinez	
(Japan) JGP Final	(China) Jin Boyang	(Russia) Adian Pitkeev	(United States) Nathan Chen	

Other international competitions
Competition	Gold	Silver	Bronze	Results
(Thailand) Asian Trophy	(Japan) Tatsuki Machida	(Uzbekistan) Misha Ge	(South Korea) Lee June-hyoung	
(Australia) Skate Down Under	(Australia) Brendan Kerry	(Australia) David Kranjec	(Malaysia) Julian Zhi Jie Yee	
Slovenia Open	(Czech Republic) Michal Březina	(Monaco) Kim Lucine	(Romania) Zoltán Kelemen	
(United States) U.S. International Classic	(United States) Max Aaron	(United States) Stephen Carriere	(United States) Joshua Farris	
(Italy) Lombardia Trophy	(Sweden) Alexander Majorov	(Philippines) Christopher Caluza	(Kazakhstan) Abzal Rakimgaliev	
(Germany) Nebelhorn Trophy	(Japan) Nobunari Oda	(United States) Jason Brown	(Canada) Jeremy Ten	
(Slovakia) Ondrej Nepela Trophy	(Czech Republic) Tomáš Verner	(Japan) Takahito Mura	(Germany) Peter Liebers	
(Finland) Finlandia Trophy	(Japan) Yuzuru Hanyu	(Russia) Sergei Voronov	(Russia) Artur Gachinski	
(Croatia) Golden Bear of Zagreb	(United Kingdom) David Richardson	(Hungary) Kristof Forgo	(Hungary) Márton Markó	
(Belarus) Ice Star	(Russia) Sergei Voronov	(Russia) Zhan Bush	(Belarus) Pavel Ignatenko	
(France) International Cup of Nice	(Czech Republic) Tomáš Verner	(Russia) Konstantin Menshov	(Russia) Zhan Bush	
Crystal Skate of Romania	(Romania) Zoltan Kelemen	(Kazakhstan) Abzal Rakimgaliev	(Italy) Maurizio Zandron	
(Latvia) Volvo Open Cup	(Russia) Evgeni Plushenko	(Russia) Alexander Petrov	(Russia) Sergei Borodulin	
(Poland) Warsaw Cup	(Switzerland) Stéphane Walker	(Belgium) Jorik Hendrickx	(Poland) Maciej Cieplucha	
(Italy) Merano Cup	(Kazakhstan) Denis Ten	(Japan) Daisuke Murakami	(Italy) Paolo Bacchini	
(Austria) Ice Challenge	(Kazakhstan) Denis Ten	(Austria) Viktor Pfeifer	(Russia) Gordei Gorshkov	
(Bulgaria) Denkova-Staviski Cup	(Uzbekistan) Misha Ge	(France) Chafik Besseghier	(France) Pierre Noel-Antoine	
(Germany) NRW Trophy	(Sweden) Alexander Majorov	(France) Brian Joubert	(Belgium) Jorik Hendrickx	
(Croatia) Golden Spin of Zagreb	(Russia) Sergei Voronov	(Russia) Artur Gachinski	(Italy) Ivan Righini	
(Italy) Winter Universiade	(China) Song Nan	(Russia) Gordei Gorshkov	(Japan) Akio Sasaki	
(Ukraine) Ukrainian Open	(Ukraine) Yakov Godorozha	(Ukraine) Ihor Reznichenko	(Ukraine) Ivan Pavlov	
(Slovakia) New Year's Cup	(Armenia) Sarkis Hayrapetyan	(Slovakia) Marco Klepoch	(Hungary) Márton Markó	
(Serbia) Skate Helena	(Philippines) Michael Christian Martinez	No other competitors		
(Germany) Bavarian Open	(Italy) Ivan Righini	(Germany) Franz Streubel	(Czech Republic) Petr Coufal	
(Slovenia) Dragon Trophy	(Russia) Mikhail Kolyada	(Denmark) Justus Strid	(Russia) Artem Lezheev	
(Austria) Hellmut Seibt Memorial	(Germany) Peter Liebers	(Germany) Paul Fentz	(Finland) Valtter Virtanen	
(Sweden) Nordic Championships	(Sweden) Alexander Majorov	(Denmark) Justus Strid	(Finland) Valtter Virtanen	
(Netherlands) International Challenge Cup	(Japan) Takahito Mura	(United States) Douglas Razzano	(France) Chafik Besseghier	
(Luxembourg) Coupe du Printemps	(Japan) Daisuke Murakami	(Japan) Ryuju Hino	(France) Charles Tetar	
(Italy) Gardena Spring Trophy	(Japan) Shoma Uno	(United States) Ross Miner	(Russia) Mikhail Kolyada	
(Slovenia) Triglav Trophy	(Philippines) Michael Christian Martinez	(Japan) Keiji Tanaka	(Japan) Ryuju Hino	

=== Ladies' singles ===
Olympics
Competition	Gold	Silver	Bronze	Results
(Russia) Winter Olympics	(Russia) Adelina Sotnikova	(South Korea) Kim Yuna	(Italy) Carolina Kostner	

Championships
Competition	Gold	Silver	Bronze	Results
(Hungary) European Championships	(Russia) Yulia Lipnitskaya	(Russia) Adelina Sotnikova	(Italy) Carolina Kostner	
(Taiwan) Four Continents Championships	(Japan) Kanako Murakami	(Japan) Satoko Miyahara	(China) Li Zijun	
(Bulgaria) World Junior Championships	(Russia) Elena Radionova	(Russia) Serafima Sakhanovich	(Russia) Evgenia Medvedeva	
(Japan) World Championships	(Japan) Mao Asada	(Russia) Yulia Lipnitskaya	(Italy) Carolina Kostner	

Grand Prix
Competition	Gold	Silver	Bronze	Results
(United States) Skate America	(Japan) Mao Asada	(United States) Ashley Wagner	(Russia) Elena Radionova	
Skate Canada International	(Russia) Yulia Lipnitskaya	(Japan) Akiko Suzuki	(United States) Gracie Gold	
Cup of China	(Russia) Anna Pogorilaya	(Russia) Adelina Sotnikova	(Italy) Carolina Kostner	
(Japan) NHK Trophy	(Japan) Mao Asada	(Russia) Elena Radionova	(Japan) Akiko Suzuki	
(France) Trophée Éric Bompard	(United States) Ashley Wagner	(Russia) Adelina Sotnikova	(Russia) Anna Pogorilaya	
(Russia) Rostelecom Cup	(Russia) Yulia Lipnitskaya	(Italy) Carolina Kostner	(United States) Mirai Nagasu	
(Japan) Grand Prix Final	(Japan) Mao Asada	(Russia) Yulia Lipnitskaya	(United States) Ashley Wagner	

Junior Grand Prix
Competition	Gold	Silver	Bronze	Results
JGP Latvia	(Russia) Evgenia Medvedeva	(Russia) Maria Sotskova	(United States) Karen Chen	
JGP Mexico	(United States) Polina Edmunds	(Russia) Natalia Ogoreltseva	(United States) Mariah Bell	
JGP Slovakia	(United States) Karen Chen	(Russia) Alexandra Proklova	(Japan) Riona Kato	
JGP Poland	(Russia) Evgenia Medvedeva	(United States) Angela Wang	(Canada) Gabrielle Daleman	
JGP Belarus	(United States) Polina Edmunds	(Kazakhstan) Elizabet Tursynbayeva	(Japan) Rika Hongo	
JGP Czech Republic	(Russia) Alexandra Proklova	(Russia) Maria Sotskova	(United States) Amber Glenn	
JGP Estonia	(Russia) Serafima Sakhanovich	(Russia) Elizaveta Iushenko	(Japan) Miyabi Oba	
(Japan) JGP Final	(Russia) Maria Sotskova	(Russia) Serafima Sakhanovich	(Russia) Evgenia Medvedeva	

Other international competitions
Competition	Gold	Silver	Bronze	Results
(Thailand) Asian Trophy	(Japan) Satoko Miyahara	(China) Zhang Kexin	(Philippines) Melissa Bulanhagui	
(Australia) Skate Down Under	(Australia) Chantelle Kerry	(Hong Kong) Sumika Yamada	(Republic of Ireland) Clara Peters	
Slovenia Open	(Austria) Kerstin Frank	(Slovenia) Daša Grm	(Luxembourg) Fleur Maxwell	
(United States) U.S. International Classic	(United States) Courtney Hicks	(United States) Gracie Gold	(United States) Samantha Cesario	
(Italy) Lombardia Trophy	(Italy) Valentina Marchei	(Germany) Sarah Hecken	(France) Anais Ventard	
(Germany) Nebelhorn Trophy	(Russia) Elena Radionova	(Japan) Miki Ando	(United States) Ashley Cain	
(Slovakia) Ondrej Nepela Trophy	(Japan) Haruka Imai	(Russia) Nikol Gosviani	(United States) Christina Gao	
(Finland) Finlandia Trophy	(Russia) Yulia Lipnitskaya	(Japan) Akiko Suzuki	(Russia) Elizaveta Tuktamysheva	
(Croatia) Golden Bear of Zagreb	(Russia) Nikol Gosviani	(Slovenia) Daša Grm	(Italy) Carol Bressanutti	
(Belarus) Ice Star	(Estonia) Helery Hälvin	(Belarus) Janina Makeenka	(Estonia) Svetlana Issakova	
(France) International Cup of Nice	(Russia) Maria Artemieva	(United States) Kiri Baga	(Germany) Nathalie Weinzierl	
Crystal Skate of Romania	(France) Laurine Lecavelier	(Italy) Francesca Rio	(Norway) Anine Rabe	
(Latvia) Volvo Open Cup	(Australia) Brooklee Han	(United Kingdom) Jenna McCorkell	(Finland) Juulia Turkkila	
(Poland) Warsaw Cup	(Poland) Agata Kryger	(Norway) Camilla Gjersem	(Czech Republic) Elizaveta Ukolova	
(Italy) Merano Cup	(Germany) Nathalie Weinzierl	(Germany) Sarah Hecken	(Italy) Carol Bressanutti	
(Austria) Ice Challenge	(United States) Courtney Hicks	(Japan) Miki Ando	(Slovakia) Nicole Rajičová	
(Bulgaria) Denkova-Staviski Cup	(Italy) Roberta Rodeghiero	(Sweden) Joshi Helgesson	(Italy) Francesca Rio	
(Germany) NRW Trophy	(Estonia) Jelena Glebova	(Russia) Polina Agafonova	(Slovakia) Nicole Rajičová	
(Croatia) Golden Spin of Zagreb	(South Korea) Kim Yuna	(Japan) Miki Ando	(Russia) Elizaveta Tuktamysheva	
(Italy) Winter Universiade	(Russia) Sofia Biryukova	(Italy) Valentina Marchei	(Russia) Sofia Mishina	
(Ukraine) Ukrainian Open	(Ukraine) Natalia Popova	(Russia) Maria Stavitskaia	(Luxembourg) Fleur Maxwell	
(Slovakia) New Year's Cup	(Czech Republic) Eliška Březinová	(Austria) Kerstin Frank	(Switzerland) Tanja Odermatt	
(Poland) Mentor Nestlé Nesquik Toruń Cup	(Poland) Agata Kryger	(Israel) Danielle Montalbano	(Spain) Marta García	
(Serbia) Skate Helena	(Finland) Juulia Turkkila	(Finland) Emilia Toikkanen	(Finland) Helena Stenbacka	
(Germany) Bavarian Open	(Sweden) Joshi Helgesson	(Switzerland) Anna Ovcharova	(France) Anais Ventard	
(Bosnia and Herzegovina) Sarajevo Open	(Sweden) Rebecka Emanelsson	(Mexico) Reyna Hamui	(Estonia) Halvin Helery	
(Slovenia) Dragon Trophy	(Russia) Valentina Chernishova	(Denmark) Anita Madsen	(Slovenia) Daša Grm	
(Austria) Hellmut Seibt Memorial	(Italy) Roberta Rodeghiero	(Italy) Francesca Rio	(Italy) Giada Russo	
(Sweden) Nordic Championships	(Sweden) Joshi Helgesson	(Sweden) Viktoria Helgesson	(Finland) Liubov Efimenko	
(Hungary) Sportland Trophy	(Italy) Carol Bressanutti	(Slovenia) Daša Grm	(Austria) Kerstin Frank	
(Netherlands) International Challenge Cup	(Sweden) Isabelle Olsson	(Japan) Haruka Imai	(Switzerland) Anna Ovcharova	
(Luxembourg) Coupe du Printemps	(Japan) Mariko Kihara	(Norway) Anine Rabe	(Switzerland) Myriam Leuenberger	
(Italy) Gardena Spring Trophy	(Japan) Satoko Miyahara	(Japan) Miyabi Oba	(Italy) Giada Russo	
(Slovenia) Triglav Trophy	(Japan) Rika Hongo	(Italy) Francesca Rio	(Sweden) Isabelle Olsson	

=== Pairs ===
Olympics
Competition	Gold	Silver	Bronze	Results
(Russia) Winter Olympics	(Russia) Tatiana Volosozhar / Maxim Trankov	(Russia) Ksenia Stolbova / Fedor Klimov	(Germany) Aliona Savchenko / Robin Szolkowy	

Championships
Competition	Gold	Silver	Bronze	Results
(Hungary) European Championships	(Russia) Tatiana Volosozhar / Maxim Trankov	(Russia) Ksenia Stolbova / Fedor Klimov	(Russia) Vera Bazarova / Yuri Larionov	
(Taiwan) Four Continents Championships	(China) Sui Wenjing / Han Cong	(United States) Tarah Kayne / Daniel O'Shea	(United States) Alexa Scimeca / Chris Knierim	
(Bulgaria) World Junior Championships	(China) Yu Xiaoyu / Jin Yang	(Russia) Evgenia Tarasova / Vladimir Morozov	(Russia) Maria Vigalova / Egor Zakroev	
(Japan) World Championships	(Germany) Aliona Savchenko / Robin Szolkowy	(Russia) Ksenia Stolbova / Fedor Klimov	(Canada) Meagan Duhamel / Eric Radford	

Grand Prix
Competition	Gold	Silver	Bronze	Results
(United States) Skate America	(Russia) Tatiana Volosozhar / Maxim Trankov	(Canada) Kirsten Moore-Towers / Dylan Moscovitch	(Russia) Ksenia Stolbova / Fedor Klimov	
Skate Canada International	(Italy) Stefania Berton / Ondřej Hotárek	(China) Sui Wenjing / Han Cong	(Canada) Meagan Duhamel / Eric Radford	
Cup of China	(Germany) Aliona Savchenko / Robin Szolkowy	(China) Pang Qing / Tong Jian	(China) Peng Cheng / Zhang Hao	
(Japan) NHK Trophy	(Russia) Tatiana Volosozhar / Maxim Trankov	(China) Peng Cheng / Zhang Hao	(China) Sui Wenjing / Han Cong	
(France) Trophée Éric Bompard	(China) Pang Qing / Tong Jian	(Canada) Meagan Duhamel / Eric Radford	(United States) Caydee Denney / John Coughlin	
(Russia) Rostelecom Cup	(Germany) Aliona Savchenko / Robin Szolkowy	(Russia) Vera Bazarova / Yuri Larionov	(Canada) Kirsten Moore-Towers / Dylan Moscovitch	
(Japan) Grand Prix Final	(Germany) Aliona Savchenko / Robin Szolkowy	(Russia) Tatiana Volosozhar / Maxim Trankov	(China) Pang Qing / Tong Jian	

Junior Grand Prix
Competition	Gold	Silver	Bronze	Results
JGP Latvia	(China) Yu Xiaoyu / Jin Yang	(Russia) Evgenia Tarasova / Vladimir Morozov	(Russia) Maria Vigalova / Egor Zakroev	
JGP Slovakia	(Russia) Maria Vigalova / Egor Zakroev	(Russia) Lina Fedorova / Maxim Miroshkin	(Russia) Oksana Nagalati / Maxim Bobrov	
JGP Belarus	(Russia) Kamilla Gainetdinova / Ivan Bich	(United States) Madeline Aaron / Max Settlage	(Russia) Vasilisa Davankova / Andrei Deputat	
JGP Czech Republic	(Russia) Lina Fedorova / Maxim Miroshkin	(Russia) Arina Cherniavskaia / Antonio Souza-Kordeyru	(Russia) Kamilla Gainetdinova / Ivan Bich	
JGP Estonia	(China) Yu Xiaoyu / Jin Yang	(Russia) Vasilisa Davankova / Andrei Deputat	(Russia) Evgenia Tarasova / Vladimir Morozov	
(Japan) JGP Final	(China) Yu Xiaoyu / Jin Yang	(Russia) Maria Vigalova / Egor Zakroev	(Russia) Lina Fedorova / Maxim Miroshkin	

Other international competitions
Competition	Gold	Silver	Bronze	Results
(Australia) Skate Down Under	(Australia) Paris Stephens / Matthew Dodds	No other competitors		
(United States) U.S. International Classic	(Canada) Kirsten Moore-Towers / Dylan Moscovitch	(United States) Caydee Denney / John Coughlin	(United States) Tarah Kayne / Daniel O'Shea	
(Italy) Lombardia Trophy	(Italy) Stefania Berton / Ondřej Hotárek	(Russia) Anastasia Martiusheva / Alexei Rogonov	(Russia) Katarina Gerboldt / Alexander Enbert	
(Germany) Nebelhorn Trophy	(Russia) Tatiana Volosozhar / Maxim Trankov	(Germany) Maylin Wende / Daniel Wende	(Germany) Mari Vartmann / Aaron Van Cleave	
(Slovakia) Ondrej Nepela Trophy	(United States) Gretchen Donlan / Andrew Speroff	(Russia) Anastasia Martiusheva / Alexei Rogonov	(United States) Alexa Scimeca / Chris Knierim	
(Belarus) Ice Star	(Russia) Kristina Astakhova / Maxim Kurdyukov	(Belarus) Maria Paliakova / Nikita Bochkov	(Russia) Arina Voevodina / Mikhail Akulov	
(France) International Cup of Nice	(Germany) Annabelle Prölss / Ruben Blommaert	(United States) Jessica Calalang / Zack Sidhu	(Germany) Maylin Wende / Daniel Wende	
(Poland) Warsaw Cup	(Russia) Ksenia Stolbova / Fedor Klimov	(Russia) Lina Fedorova / Maxim Miroshkin	(Belarus) Maria Paliakova / Nikita Bochkov	
(Italy) Merano Cup	(Italy) Stefania Berton / Ondřej Hotárek	(Germany) Maylin Wende / Daniel Wende	(Germany) Mari Vartmann / Aaron Van Cleave	
(Austria) Ice Challenge	(United States) Gretchen Donlan / Andrew Speroff	(Germany) Maylin Wende / Daniel Wende	(United States) Tarah Kayne / Daniel O'Shea	
(Bulgaria) Denkova-Staviski Cup	(France) Vanessa James / Morgan Ciprès	No other competitors		
(Germany) NRW Trophy	(Russia) Vera Bazarova / Yuri Larionov	(Germany) Maylin Wende / Daniel Wende	(Germany) Mari Vartmann / Aaron Van Cleave	
(Croatia) Golden Spin of Zagreb	(Israel) Andrea Davidovich / Evgeni Krasnopolski	(Estonia) Natalja Zabijako / Alexandr Zaboev	(Ukraine) Julia Lavrentieva / Yuri Rudyk	
(Italy) Winter Universiade	(Russia) Ksenia Stolbova / Fedor Klimov	(Russia) Evgenia Tarasova / Vladimir Morozov	(Italy) Nicole Della Monica / Matteo Guarise	
(Ukraine) Ukrainian Open	(Ukraine) Julia Lavrentieva / Yuri Rudyk	(Russia) Arina Voevodina / Mikhail Akulov	(Ukraine) Elizaveta Usmantseva / Roman Talan	
(Poland) Mentor Nestlé Nesquik Toruń Cup	(Italy) Giulia Foresti / Luca Dematte	(Spain) Veronica Grigorieva / Aritz Maestu	No other competitors	
(Netherlands) International Challenge Cup	(France) Daria Popova / Bruno Massot	(Germany) Annabelle Prölss / Ruben Blommaert	(Italy) Giulia Foresti / Luca Demattè	

=== Ice dance ===
Olympics
Competition	Gold	Silver	Bronze	Results
(Russia) Winter Olympics	(United States) Meryl Davis / Charlie White	(Canada) Tessa Virtue / Scott Moir	(Russia) Elena Ilinykh / Nikita Katsalapov	

Championships
Competition	Gold	Silver	Bronze	Results
(Hungary) European Championships	(Italy) Anna Cappellini / Luca Lanotte	(Russia) Elena Ilinykh / Nikita Katsalapov	(United Kingdom) Penny Coomes / Nicholas Buckland	
(Taiwan) Four Continents Championships	(United States) Madison Hubbell / Zachary Donohue	(Canada) Piper Gilles / Paul Poirier	(United States) Alexandra Aldridge / Daniel Eaton	
(Bulgaria) World Junior Championships	(United States) Kaitlin Hawayek / Jean-Luc Baker	(Russia) Anna Yanovskaya / Sergey Mozgov	(Canada) Madeline Edwards / Zhao Kai Pang	
(Japan) World Championships	(Italy) Anna Cappellini / Luca Lanotte	(Canada) Kaitlyn Weaver / Andrew Poje	(France) Nathalie Péchalat / Fabian Bourzat	

Grand Prix
Competition	Gold	Silver	Bronze	Results
(United States) Skate America	(United States) Meryl Davis / Charlie White	(Italy) Anna Cappellini / Luca Lanotte	(United States) Maia Shibutani / Alex Shibutani	
Skate Canada International	(Canada) Tessa Virtue / Scott Moir	(Canada) Kaitlyn Weaver / Andrew Poje	(United States) Madison Hubbell / Zachary Donohue	
Cup of China	(France) Nathalie Péchalat / Fabian Bourzat	(Russia) Ekaterina Bobrova / Dmitri Soloviev	(United States) Madison Chock / Evan Bates	
(Japan) NHK Trophy	(United States) Meryl Davis / Charlie White	(Italy) Anna Cappellini / Luca Lanotte	(United States) Maia Shibutani / Alex Shibutani	
(France) Trophée Éric Bompard	(Canada) Tessa Virtue / Scott Moir	(Russia) Elena Ilinykh / Nikita Katsalapov	(France) Nathalie Péchalat / Fabian Bourzat	
(Russia) Rostelecom Cup	(Russia) Ekaterina Bobrova / Dmitri Soloviev	(Canada) Kaitlyn Weaver / Andrew Poje	(United States) Madison Chock / Evan Bates	
(Japan) Grand Prix Final	(United States) Meryl Davis / Charlie White	(Canada) Tessa Virtue / Scott Moir	(France) Nathalie Péchalat / Fabian Bourzat	

Junior Grand Prix
Competition	Gold	Silver	Bronze	Results
JGP Latvia	(Canada) Mackenzie Bent / Garrett MacKeen	(United States) Lorraine McNamara / Quinn Carpenter	(Russia) Alla Loboda / Pavel Drozd	
JGP Mexico	(United States) Kaitlin Hawayek / Jean-Luc Baker	(Canada) Madeline Edwards / Zhao Kai Pang	(Russia) Sofia Evdokimova / Egor Bazin	
JGP Slovakia	(Russia) Anna Yanovskaya / Sergey Mozgov	(United States) Rachel Parsons / Michael Parsons	(United States) Holly Moore / Daniel Klaber	
JGP Poland	(United States) Kaitlin Hawayek / Jean-Luc Baker	(Ukraine) Oleksandra Nazarova / Maxim Nikitin	(Russia) Alla Loboda / Pavel Drozd	
JGP Belarus	(United States) Lorraine McNamara / Quinn Carpenter	(Russia) Betina Popova / Yuri Vlasenko	(Russia) Daria Morozova / Mikhail Zhirnov	
JGP Czech Republic	(Russia) Betina Popova / Yuri Vlasenko	(United States) Rachel Parsons / Michael Parsons	(Canada) Madeline Edwards / Zhao Kai Pang	
JGP Estonia	(Russia) Anna Yanovskaya / Sergey Mozgov	(Ukraine) Oleksandra Nazarova / Maxim Nikitin	(Russia) Daria Morozova / Mikhail Zhirnov	
(Japan) JGP Final	(Russia) Anna Yanovskaya / Sergey Mozgov	(United States) Kaitlin Hawayek / Jean-Luc Baker	(United States) Lorraine McNamara / Quinn Carpenter	

Other international competitions
Competition	Gold	Silver	Bronze	Results
(Australia) Skate Down Under	(Australia) Danielle O'Brien / Gregory Merriman	(Switzerland) Romana Elsener / Florian Roost	(New Zealand) Ayesha Campbell / Shane Speden	
(United States) U.S. International Classic	(United States) Meryl Davis / Charlie White	(Canada) Kaitlyn Weaver / Andrew Poje	(Canada) Nicole Orford / Thomas Williams	
(Germany) Nebelhorn Trophy	(United States) Madison Hubbell / Zachary Donohue	(Russia) Ksenia Monko / Kirill Khaliavin	(Canada) Alexandra Paul / Mitchell Islam	
(Slovakia) Ondrej Nepela Trophy	(United Kingdom) Penny Coomes / Nicholas Buckland	(Italy) Charlène Guignard / Marco Fabbri	(Germany) Tanja Kolbe / Stefano Caruso	
(Finland) Finlandia Trophy	(Canada) Tessa Virtue / Scott Moir	(United States) Madison Chock / Evan Bates	(Poland) Justyna Plutowska / Peter Gerber	
(Belarus) Ice Star	(Russia) Ekaterina Bobrova / Dmitri Soloviev	(Russia) Victoria Sinitsina / Ruslan Zhiganshin	(Russia) Ekaterina Pushkash / Jonathan Guerreiro	
(France) International Cup of Nice	(France) Gabriella Papadakis / Guillaume Cizeron	(Italy) Lorenza Alessandrini / Simone Vaturi	(Russia) Ksenia Monko / Kirill Khaliavin	
(Germany) NRW Trophy	(Italy) Charlène Guignard / Marco Fabbri	(Turkey) Alisa Agafonova / Alper Uçar	(Canada) Kharis Ralph / Asher Hill	
(Latvia) Volvo Open Cup	(Azerbaijan) Julia Zlobina / Alexei Sitnikov	(Germany) Nelli Zhiganshina / Alexander Gazsi	(Italy) Lorenza Alessandrini / Simone Vaturi	
(Netherlands) International Challenge Cup	(United States) Anastasia Cannuscio / Colin McManus	(Denmark) Laurence Fournier Beaudry / Nikolaj Sørensen	(Germany) Tanja Kolbe / Stefano Caruso	
(Croatia) Golden Spin of Zagreb	(Azerbaijan) Julia Zlobina / Alexei Sitnikov	(France) Pernelle Carron / Lloyd Jones	(Turkey) Alisa Agafonova / Alper Uçar	
(Italy) Winter Universiade	(France) Pernelle Carron / Lloyd Jones	(Azerbaijan) Julia Zlobina / Alexei Sitnikov	(Russia) Victoria Sinitsina / Ruslan Zhiganshin	
(Ukraine) Ukrainian Open	(Azerbaijan) Julia Zlobina / Alexei Sitnikov	(Estonia) Irina Shtork / Taavi Rand	(Ukraine) Siobhan Heekin-Canedy / Dmitri Dun	
(Poland) Mentor Nestlé Nesquik Toruń Cup	(Russia) Ekaterina Pushkash / Jonathan Guerreiro	(Spain) Sara Hurtado / Adrià Díaz	(Denmark) Laurence Fournier Beaudry / Nikolaj Sørensen	

== Season's best scores ==
=== Men's singles ===
Top 10 season's best scores in the men's combined total
No.	Skater	Nation	Score	Event
1	Patrick Chan	Canada	295.27	2013 Trophée Éric Bompard
2	Yuzuru Hanyu	Japan	293.25	2013–14 Grand Prix Final
3	Tatsuki Machida	Japan	282.26	2014 World Championships
4	Javier Fernández	Spain	275.93	2014 World Championships
5	Daisuke Takahashi	Japan	268.31	2013 NHK Trophy
6	Nobunari Oda	Japan	262.98	2013 Nebelhorn Trophy
7	Denis Ten	Kazakhstan	255.10	2014 Winter Olympics
8	Sergei Voronov	Russia	252.55	2014 European Championships
9	Maxim Kovtun	Russia	247.37	2014 World Championships
10	Jeremy Abbott	United States	246.35	2014 World Championships

=== Ladies' singles ===
Top 10 season's best scores in the ladies' combined total
No.	Skater	Nation	Score	Event
1	Adelina Sotnikova	Russia	224.59	2014 Winter Olympics
2	Kim Yuna	South Korea	219.11	2014 Winter Olympics
3	Carolina Kostner	Italy	216.73	2014 Winter Olympics
4	Mao Asada	Japan	216.69	2014 World Championships
5	Yulia Lipnitskaya	Russia	209.72	2014 European Championships
6	Gracie Gold	United States	205.53	2014 Winter Olympics
7	Anna Pogorilaya	Russia	197.50	2014 World Championships
8	Kanako Murakami	Japan	196.91	2014 Four Continents Championships
9	Ashley Wagner	United States	194.37	2013 Trophée Éric Bompard
10	Elena Radionova	Russia	194.29	2014 World Junior Championships

=== Pairs ===
Top 10 season's best scores in the pairs' combined total
No.	Team	Nation	Score	Event
1	Tatiana Volosozhar / Maxim Trankov	Russia	237.71	2013 Skate America
2	Aliona Savchenko / Robin Szolkowy	Germany	227.03	2013–14 Grand Prix Final
3	Ksenia Stolbova / Fedor Klimov	Russia	218.68	2014 Winter Olympics
4	Pang Qing / Tong Jian	China	213.98	2013–14 Grand Prix Final
5	Sui Wenjing / Han Cong	China	212.40	2014 Four Continents Championships
6	Meagan Duhamel / Eric Radford	Canada	210.84	2014 World Championships
7	Kirsten Moore-Towers / Dylan Moscovitch	Canada	208.45	2013 Skate America
8	Vera Bazarova / Yuri Larionov	Russia	201.61	2013 Rostelecom Cup
9	Peng Cheng / Zhang Hao	China	197.37	2013–14 Grand Prix Final
10	Stefania Berton / Ondřej Hotárek	Italy	195.61	2014 European Championships

=== Ice dance ===
Top 10 season's best scores in the combined total (ice dance)
No.	Team	Nation	Score	Event
1	Meryl Davis / Charlie White	United States	195.52	2014 Winter Olympics
2	Tessa Virtue / Scott Moir	Canada	190.99	2014 Winter Olympics
3	Elena Ilinykh / Nikita Katsalapov	Russia	183.48	2014 Winter Olympics
4	Nathalie Péchalat / Fabian Bourzat	France	177.22	2014 Winter Olympics
5	Anna Cappellini / Luca Lanotte	Italy	175.43	2014 World Championships
6	Kaitlyn Weaver / Andrew Poje	Canada	175.41	2014 World Championships
7	Ekaterina Bobrova / Dmitri Soloviev	Russia	172.92	2014 Winter Olympics
8	Madison Chock / Evan Bates	United States	167.59	2014 World Championships
9	Penny Coomes / Nicholas Buckland	Great Britain	158.69	2014 European Championships
10	Maia Shibutani / Alex Shibutani	United States	158.57	2014 World Championships

== World standings ==
=== Men's singles ===
As of March 28, 2014

No.	Skater	Nation
1	Yuzuru Hanyu	Japan
2	Patrick Chan	Canada
3	Tatsuki Machida	Japan
4	Javier Fernandez	Spain
5	Denis Ten	Kazakhstan
6	Daisuke Takahashi	Japan
7	Michal Březina	Czech Republic
8	Takahito Mura	Japan
9	Maxim Kovtun	Russia
10	Takahiko Kozuka	Japan

=== Ladies' singles ===
As of March 29, 2014

No.	Skater	Nation
1	Mao Asada	Japan
2	Carolina Kostner	Italy
3	Yulia Lipnitskaya	Russia
4	Adelina Sotnikova	Russia
5	Ashley Wagner	United States
6	Akiko Suzuki	Japan
7	Gracie Gold	United States
8	Kanako Murakami	Japan
9	Elena Radionova	Russia
10	Yuna Kim	South Korea

=== Pairs ===
As of March 27, 2014

No.	Team	Nation
1	Tatiana Volosozhar / Maxim Trankov	Russia
2	Aliona Savchenko / Robin Szolkowy	Germany
3	Kirsten Moore-Towers / Dylan Moscovitch	Canada
4	Meagan Duhamel / Eric Radford	Canada
5	Pang Qing / Tong Jian	China
6	Ksenia Stolbova / Fedor Klimov	Russia
7	Stefania Berton / Ondrej Hotarek	Italy
8	Vera Bazarova / Yuri Larionov	Russia
9	Marissa Castelli / Simon Shnapir	United States
10	Peng Cheng / Zhang Hao	China

=== Ice dance ===
As of March 29, 2014

No.	Team	Nation
1	Meryl Davis / Charlie White	United States
2	Tessa Virtue / Scott Moir	Canada
3	Ekaterina Bobrova / Dmitri Soloviev	Russia
4	Anna Cappellini / Luca Lanotte	Italy
5	Kaitlyn Weaver / Andrew Poje	Canada
6	Nathalie Péchalat / Fabian Bourzat	France
7	Elena Ilinykh / Nikita Katsalapov	Russia
8	Madison Chock / Evan Bates	United States
9	Madison Hubbell / Zachary Donohue	United States
10	Penny Coomes / Nicholas Buckland	Great Britain

== Current season's world rankings ==
=== Men's singles ===
As of March 28, 2014

No.	Skater	Nation
1	Yuzuru Hanyu	Japan
2	Tatsuki Machida	Japan
3	Patrick Chan	Canada
4	Denis Ten	Kazakhstan
5	Maxim Kovtun	Russia
6	Javier Fernandez	Spain
7	Takahito Mura	Japan
8	Yan Han	China
9	Daisuke Takahashi	Japan
10	Konstantin Menshov	Russia

=== Ladies' singles ===
As of March 29, 2014

No.	Skater	Nation
1	Yulia Lipnitskaya	Russia
2	Mao Asada	Japan
3	Adelina Sotnikova	Russia
4	Anna Pogorilaya	Russia
5	Gracie Gold	United States
6	Elena Radionova	Russia
7	Ashley Wagner	United States
8	Carolina Kostner	Italy
9	Akiko Suzuki	Japan
10	Satoko Miyahara	Japan

=== Pairs ===
As of March 27, 2014

No.	Team	Nation
1	Tatiana Volosozhar / Maxim Trankov	Russia
2	Aliona Savchenko / Robin Szolkowy	Germany
3	Kirsten Moore-Towers / Dylan Moscovitch	Canada
4	Ksenia Stolbova / Fedor Klimov	Russia
5	Pang Qing / Tong Jian	China
6	Meagan Duhamel / Eric Radford	Canada
7	Stefania Berton / Ondrej Hotarek	Italy
8	Peng Cheng / Zhang Hao	China
9	Sui Wenjing / Han Cong	China
10	Alexa Scimeca / Chris Knierim	United States

=== Ice dance ===
As of March 29, 2014

No.	Team	Nation
1	Meryl Davis / Charlie White	United States
2	Tessa Virtue / Scott Moir	Canada
3	Kaitlyn Weaver / Andrew Poje	Canada
4	Anna Cappellini / Luca Lanotte	Italy
5	Ekaterina Bobrova / Dmitri Soloviev	Russia
6	Nathalie Péchalat / Fabian Bourzat	France
7	Madison Hubbell / Zachary Donohue	United States
8	Madison Chock / Evan Bates	United States
9	Elena Ilinykh / Nikita Katsalapov	Russia
10	Nelli Zhiganshina / Alexander Gazsi	Germany
