= Margaret Purdy =

Canadian pair skater (born 1995)

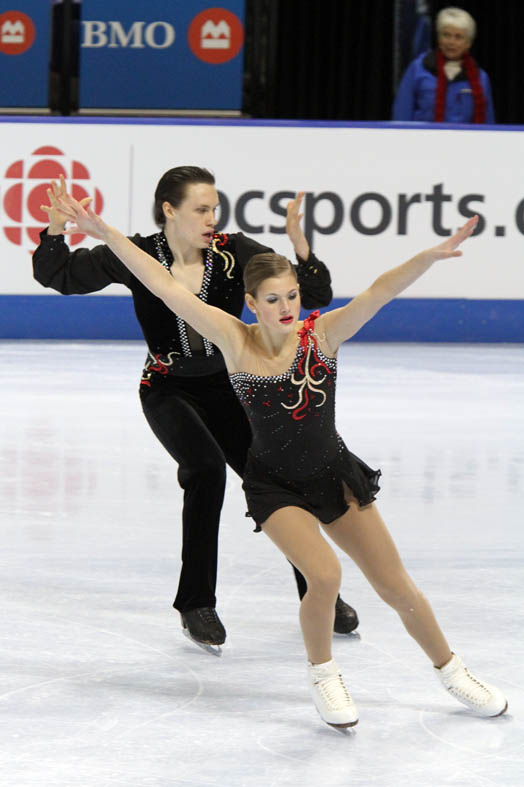
- Purdy/Marinaro at the 2011 Canadian Championships

Personal information
- Born: January 18, 1995 (age 31) London, Ontario
- Height: 1.66 m (5 ft 5 1/2 in)

Figure skating career
- Country: Canada
- Began skating: 2002
- Retired: May 27, 2014
Medal record
Representing Canada
Pair skating
World Junior Championships
Silver medal – second place	2013 Milan	Pairs

Margaret Purdy (born January 18, 1995) is a Canadian former competitive pair skater. With Michael Marinaro, she is the 2013 World Junior silver medalist and 2010 Canadian national junior champion.

== Personal life ==
Purdy attended the University of Western Ontario from September 2014 to 2018, studying social sciences.

== Career ==
Purdy started skating at age four as a hockey player and switched to figure skating at age seven.

In May 2007, Purdy teamed up with Michael Marinaro to train in pairs. In the 2009–10 season, they debuted on the ISU Junior Grand Prix series and won the Canadian junior title. The pair placed eighth in The Hague at their first World Junior Championships.

In the 2011–12 season, Purdy/Marinaro won their first JGP medal — bronze in Latvia — and placed fifth at the 2012 World Junior Championships in Minsk. The following season, they won gold at their two JGP assignments, in the United States and Croatia, and qualified for the JGP Final, where they placed fourth. The pair took silver at the 2013 World Junior Championships in Milan, behind Haven Denney / Brandon Frazier.

In September 2013, Purdy/Marinaro and their coaches moved their training base from Strathroy to Komoka. The pair appeared at two senior Grand Prix events, the 2013 Skate America and 2013 Skate Canada International, finishing eighth at both. After placing fifth at the 2014 Canadians, they were assigned to the 2014 Four Continents and came in sixth. On May 27, 2014, they announced the end of their partnership and Purdy retired from elite competition.

== Programs ==
(with Marinaro)

Season	Short program	Free skating	Exhibition
2013–2014	Unchained Melody by Alex North	Casablanca by Max Steiner	
2012–2013	O mio babbino caro (from Gianni Schicchi) by Giacomo Puccini	The Artist by Ludovic Bource	Beauty and a Beat by Justin Bieber featuring Nicki Minaj
2011–2012	Fuente y Caudal by Paco de Lucía; Harlem Nocturne	Who Wants to Live Forever; The Show Must Go On by Queen	Someone Like You by Adele
2010–2011	Fuente y Caudal by Paco de Lucía	New Moon by Alexandre Desplat	
2009–2010	Santa Maria by Gotan Project	Here, There and Everywhere; Something by The Beatles	

== Competitive highlights ==
(with Marinaro)

Results
International
Event	2007–08	2008–09	2009–10	2010–11	2011–12	2012–13	2013–14
Four Continents							6th
GP Skate America							8th
GP Skate Canada							8th
International: Junior
Junior Worlds			8th		5th	2nd	
JGP Final						4th	
JGP Austria					10th		
JGP Croatia						1st	
JGP Czech Rep.				9th			
JGP Germany			10th				
JGP Latvia					3rd		
JGP Poland			7th				
JGP UK				10th			
JGP USA						1st	
National
Canadian Champ.	2nd PN	3rd N.	1st J.	9th	6th	5th	5th
GP = Grand Prix; JGP = Junior Grand Prix; Levels: PN = Pre-novice; N. = Novice; J. = Junior
