= Stefania Berton =

Italian pair skater (born 1990)

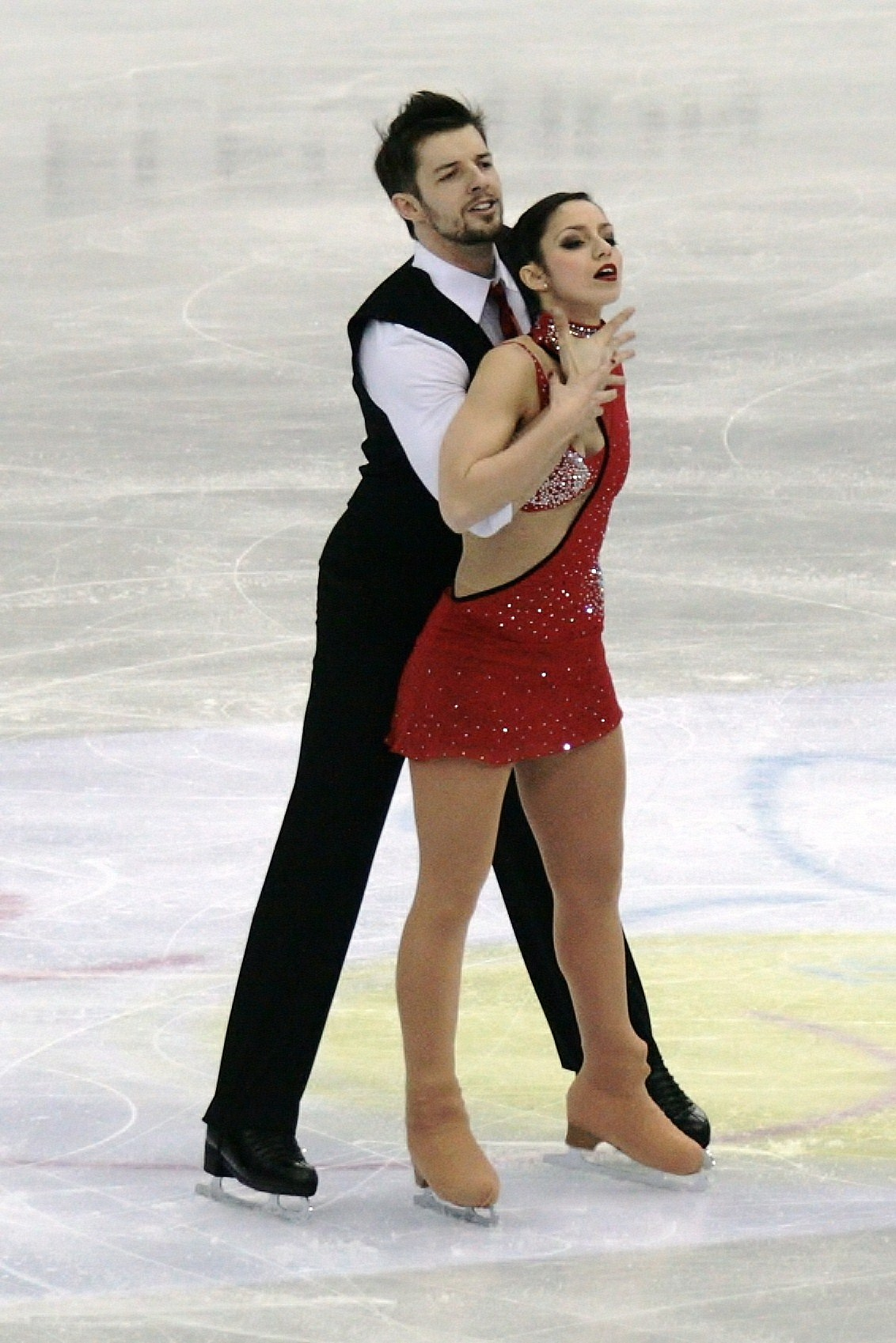
- Berton and Hotárek in 2012

Personal information
- Born: 19 July 1990 (age 36) Asiago, Italy
- Home town: Milan
- Height: 1.61 m (5 ft 3 in)

Figure skating career
- Country: Italy
- Coach: Franca Bianconi, Karel Fajfr
- Skating club: Sesto Ice Skate Milano
- Began skating: 1994

Medal record
European Championships
Bronze medal – third place	2013 Zagreb	Pairs
Italian Championships
Silver medal – second place	2007 Trento	Singles
Silver medal – second place	2008 Milan	Singles
Bronze medal – third place	2009 Pinerolo	Singles

Stefania Berton (born 19 July 1990) is an Italian competitive pair skater. With partner Ondřej Hotárek, she is the 2013 European bronze medalist, the 2013 Skate Canada International champion, and a three-time Italian national champion. Berton/Hotárek are the first Italian pair skaters to win European and Grand Prix medals.

Berton previously competed as a single skater and ice dancer.

== Personal life ==
Stefania Berton was born 19 July 1990 in Asiago, Italy. In January 2012, she became a member of the sports group of the Italian police. She became engaged to American pair skater Rockne Brubaker on 2 February 2013. The couple married on June 5, 2015, in Wisconsin.

== Career ==
As a singles skater, Berton won the silver medal at the 2007 Italian Nationals and placed 6th at the 2006 Junior Grand Prix Final. As an ice dancer, she competed on the novice level with Marco Fabbri.

=== Partnership with Hotarek ===
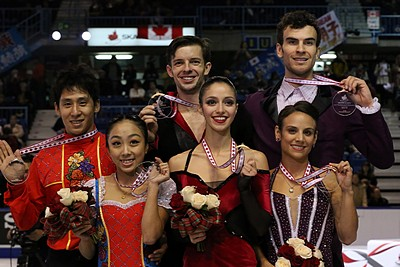
Berton and Hotárek at the Skate Canada podium.

Berton teamed up with Ondřej Hotárek to compete in pair skating in early 2009. They won the silver medal at 2010 Italian Nationals and were selected to compete at the World Championships. They placed 11th in their debut at the event.

During the 2010–11 season, Berton/Hotárek won silver at the Nebelhorn Trophy and also debuted on the Grand Prix circuit, finishing sixth at Cup of Russia. They won their first Italian national title and were sent to the 2011 European Championships. They placed fourth in the short program and fifth in the free program, setting personal bests in both, and finished fifth overall with their best combined total to date, 164.83 points.

Berton/Hotárek began the 2011–12 season at the 2011 Ondrej Nepela Memorial, where they won the silver medal. In the Grand Prix season, they placed 4th at 2011 NHK Trophy and then won bronze at 2011 Rostelecom Cup, making them the first Italian pair to medal on the Grand Prix circuit. At the 2012 European Championships, they placed 4th, historically the highest Italian result in pairs.

In the 2012–13 season, Berton/Hotárek were assigned to the 2012 Skate Canada International and 2012 Trophée Eric Bompard. After taking bronze at both events, they won bronze at the 2013 European Championships, becoming the first Italian pair skaters to medal at Europeans.

Berton/Hotárek started the 2013–14 Grand Prix season at the 2013 Skate America and finished 5th. They won their first GP title at the 2013 Skate Canada and then finished 4th at the 2014 European Championships, behind Vera Bazarova / Yuri Larionov. Berton/Hotárek finished 11th in the pairs event at the 2014 Winter Olympics in Sochi, Russia.

For the 2014–15 season, Berton/Hotarek were assigned to 2014 Skate America and the 2014 Rostelecom Cup. On 2 July 2014, La Gazzetta dello Sport reported that their partnership had ended. In August 2014, Berton said she had not wanted to split from Hotarek and that she was searching for a partner to continue her competitive career.

== Programs ==
=== With Hotarek ===
Season	Short program	Free skating	Exhibition
2013–2014	The Mask by Randy Edelman	Dracula by Philip Glass	Nessun dorma by Luciano Pavarotti
2012–2013	Paint It Black by The Rolling Stones	Poeta en el viento by Vicente Amigo	Dirty Dancing
2011–2012	Harlem Nocturne by Earle Hagen, Dick Rogers; Demasiado Corazon by Willy DeVille choreo. by Pasquale Camerlengo	Adagio in G minor for Organ and Strings by Remo Giazotto, Tomaso Albinoni choreo. by Anjelika Krylova	Caruso by Lucio Dalla, Luciano Pavarotti
2010–2011	Invierno Porteno by Astor Piazzolla	Romeo and Juliet (1968 film) by Nino Rota	Unchained Melody by The Righteous Brothers
2009–2010	Caos Calmo by Buonvino	Notre Dame de Paris (1999 TV movie) by Riccardo Cocciante	Romeo and Juliet (1968 film) by Nino Rota

=== Single skating ===
Season	Short program	Free skating
2008–2009	Jalousie Tango by Jacob Gade	Pride and Prejudice (1995 TV series) by Carl Davis
2007–2008	Ca va by Roger Waters	Les Retrouvailles by Yann Tiersen
2006–2007	Preludium and Allegro on a theme of Paganini by Fritz Kreisler	Rain by Ryuichi Sakamoto

== Competitive highlights ==
=== Pair skating with Hotárek ===
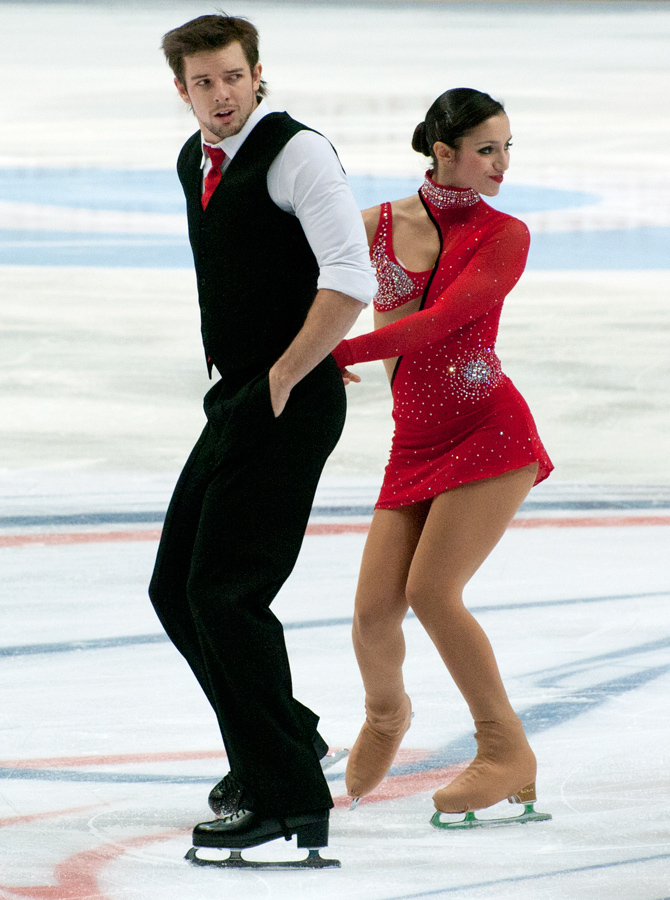
Berton/Hotárek at the 2011 Rostelecom Cup

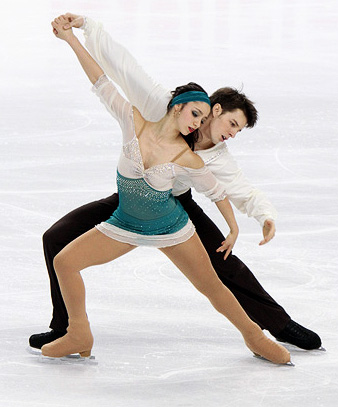
Berton/Hotárek at the 2010 World Championships.

International
Event	2009–10	2010–11	2011–12	2012–13	2013–14
Olympics					11th
Worlds	11th	10th	11th	10th	9th
Europeans		5th	4th	3rd	4th
GP Bompard				3rd	
GP NHK Trophy			4th		
GP Rostelecom		6th	3rd		
GP Skate America					5th
GP Skate Canada				3rd	1st
Cup of Nice			1st		
Ice Challenge	3rd				
Lombardia Trophy					1st
Nebelhorn Trophy		2nd			
NRW Trophy	2nd	1st		2nd	
Ondrej Nepela			2nd	2nd	
National
Italian Champ.	2nd	1st	1st	1st	1st
Team events
Olympics					4th T

=== Single skating ===
International
Event	2004–05	2005–06	2006–07	2007–08	2008–09
European Champ.				13th	16th
Crystal Skate					1st
Cup of Nice					3rd
International: Junior
World Junior Champ.			10th	13th	
JGP Final			6th		
JGP Bulgaria				6th	
JGP Croatia		12th			
JGP Czech Republic					3rd
JGP Estonia		9th			
JGP France	12th		3rd		4th
JGP Norway			2nd		
JGP Romania	17th				
JGP United Kingdom				7th	
Gardena Trophy		5th J.			
National
Italian Champ.			2nd	2nd	3rd
