= Mission: Impossible (1999 video game) =

- North American cover art
- Developer: Rebellion Developments
- Publisher: Infogrames
- Platform: Game Boy Color
- Release: FRA: November 23, 1999; NA: February 22, 2000; EU: August 1, 2000
- Genre: Adventure
- Mode: Single-player

Mission: Impossible is an adventure video game based upon the Mission: Impossible film series. It was developed by Rebellion Developments and published by Infogrames for the Game Boy Color in 1999.

== Gameplay ==
Mission: Impossible is an adventure game where the player must control the film series' character Ethan Hunt through ten levels. The game also contains a number of utility programs which include a calculator, an address book, and a notebook which can print entries when connected to a Game Boy Printer. The utilities also include a message transmitter and a universal remote which both use the system's infrared port.

== Reception ==
Reception

Aggregate score
Aggregator	Score
GameRankings	58%

Review scores
Publication	Score
AllGame	2/5
GameSpot	5.2/10
IGN	4/10
N64 Magazine	3/5
Nintendo Power	6.9/10

Mission: Impossible received mixed reviews according to video game review aggregator GameRankings. Reviewers compared it negatively to Metal Gear: Ghost Babel, but praised the game's extra features. N64 Magazine described it as a "painfully average" game, stating that opponents wander around in set patterns and that they are not smart enough to notice the player.
