= Mission: Impossible vs. the Mob =

- Australian theatrical released poster
- Directed by: Paul Stanley
- Written by: Allan Balter; William Read Woodfield; Robert Towne
- Produced by: Bruce Geller; Joseph Gantman; Robert F. O'Neill; John W. Rogers
- Starring: Peter Graves; Martin Landau; Barbara Bain; Greg Morris; Peter Lupus; Vincent Gardenia; Nick Colasanto Lucetta Kallis
- Cinematography: Michel Hugo
- Music by: Lalo Schifrin
- Distributed by: Paramount Pictures
- Release date: December 1969
- Running time: 110 minutes
- Country: United States
- Language: English

Mission: Impossible vs. the Mob is a 1969 American spy film. It is the first film based on the television series Mission: Impossible, consisting of a compilation of a two-part episode of the original series from 1967 titled "The Council".

The film was released in parts of Europe, Australia and Japan. Theatrical posters were released for its screening in Australia.

== Plot ==
By taking over honest businesses, a criminal enterprise headed by Frank Wayne is corrupting the nation’s economy by depositing millions of dollars into Swiss bank accounts, causing an intolerable drain of U.S. gold reserves. In order to get the syndicate’s records, turn them over to the proper authorities, and put an end to the organization, Rollin poses as Wayne, and Jim poses as an ambitious prosecutor.

== Cast ==
Actor	Role
Peter Graves	Jim Phelps
Martin Landau	Rollin Hand
Barbara Bain	Cinnamon Carter
Greg Morris	Barney Collier
Peter Lupus	Willy Armitage
Vincent Gardenia	Vito Lugana
Eduardo Ciannelli	Jack Rycher
Nicholas Colasanto	Jimmy Bibo
Paul Lambert	Al Morgan
Paul Stevens	Frank Wayne
Stuart Nisbet	Dr. Emerson Reese

== See also ==
- Mission: Impossible (film series)
- The Man from U.N.C.L.E. § Feature films, another spy-themed TV-series with several offshoot movies made of episodes from the series
- List of American films of 1967
