= Mission: Impossible – The Final Reckoning (soundtrack) =

Mission: Impossible – The Final Reckoning (Music from the Motion Picture)

Film score by Max Aruj and Alfie Godfrey
- Released: May 23, 2025
- Genre: Film score
- Length: 2:04:01
- Label: Sony Classical Records
- Producer: Cecile Tournesac

Max Aruj chronology
MoviePass, MovieCrash (2024)	Mission: Impossible – The Final Reckoning (Music from the Motion Picture) (2025)

Mission: Impossible – The Final Reckoning (Music from the Motion Picture) is the soundtrack to the 2025 film Mission: Impossible – The Final Reckoning, the eighth installment in the Mission: Impossible film series and the sequel to Mission: Impossible – Dead Reckoning Part One (2023). Lorne Balfe, who composed the score for the two previous films, was originally planned to come back, but in April 2025, it was announced he would be replaced by Max Aruj and Alfie Godfrey. The soundtrack to the film was released digitally on May 23, 2025, alongside the film by Sony Music Entertainment and Paramount Music, with a physical release the subsequent month.

== Development ==
Lorne Balfe was originally announced in May 2020 to compose the film's score, after composing the previous two movies' soundtracks. He was later replaced by Max Aruj and Alfie Godfrey, which was announced in April 2025, the month before the soundtrack's release. The soundtrack is a little bit over 2 hours long in total and contains only instrumental music. As well as incorporating Lalo Schifrin's thematic material from the television series throughout the score, seven cues sample music by Constance Demby from her album Sonic Immersion: A Vibratory Tonal Attunement, primarily from tracks titled "Chakra".

== Track listing ==
All music is composed by Max Aruj and Alfie Godfrey.

No.	Title	Length
1.	"We Live And Die In The Shadows^{[a]}"	0:44
2.	"Another Sunrise^{[a]}"	2:27
3.	"Come Home Ethan^{[a]}"	2:27
4.	"Main Titles (from Mission: Impossible – The Final Reckoning)^{[a]}"	1:07
5.	"Martial Law^{[a]}^{[b]}"	3:06
6.	"Enter Paris^{[b]}"	2:31
7.	"Origins^{[a]}"	3:28
8.	"It's Only Pain^{[a]}"	1:42
9.	"It Will Change You (Ça Te Changera)^{[a]}"	1:57
10.	"The Entity^{[a]}^{[c]}"	4:06
11.	"The Entity's Future^{[a]}"	3:11
12.	"I'll Be Waiting^{[a]}"	2:49
13.	"This Is Where You Leave Me^{[a]}"	3:08
14.	"I Know You^{[a]}"	5:22
15.	"Mt Weather^{[a]}^{[b]}"	2:07
16.	"Checkmate"	3:11
17.	"I Have No Regrets"	1:25
18.	"The Eye Of The Storm^{[a]}^{[b]}"	2:03
19.	"Nothing Is Certain^{[a]}^{[b]}^{[d]}"	4:36
20.	"Firefight^{[a]}^{[b]}"	4:04
21.	"The Icecap^{[a]}"	3:57
22.	"The Sevastopol^{[a]}^{[b]}^{[c]}^{[d]}^{[e]}"	5:33
23.	"Ascending"	2:31
24.	"I Owe You My Life^{[a]}"	7:21
25.	"Consequences^{[a]}"	3:23
26.	"Your Final Reckoning^{[a]}"	5:17
27.	"We'll Figure It Out^{[a]}^{[b]}"	2:03
28.	"Liftoff^{[a]}^{[b]}^{[e]}"	1:28
29.	"Decisions^{[a]}^{[b]}^{[e]}"	2:22
30.	"This Is Not Good^{[a]}^{[b]}"	1:10
31.	"Problems^{[a]}^{[b]}^{[e]}"	1:31
32.	"Tailstrike^{[a]}"	1:04
33.	"Ten Seconds... Maybe^{[a]}^{[b]}^{[e]}"	2:26
34.	"Good Luck^{[a]}"	1:58
35.	"Descending^{[a]}"	2:19
36.	"A Light We Cannot See^{[a]}"	9:15
37.	"Curtain Call^{[a]}"	1:52
38.	"For Those We Never Meet (Bonus Track)"	5:01
39.	"The Arctic (Bonus Track)^{[a]}^{[b]}"	1:44
40.	"This Is My Mission (Bonus Track)^{[a]}^{[b]}"	3:17
41.	"Encore (Bonus Track)^{[a]}"	0:59
42.	"Final Reckoning – Sacrifice Teaser (Bonus Track)^{[a]}"	1:59
Total length:		2:04:01

== Charts ==
Chart (2025)	Peak position
UK Soundtrack Albums (Official Charts)	10

== Reception ==
Tom Cruise, who plays the main character Ethan Hunt, was very supportive of the composer duo and "danced in his seat" the first time he heard the soundtrack during an early screening of the film.

Filmtracks.com dubbed the score "pleasantly surprising", noting that "[the] muscularity of Balfe's style works well without his more abrasive habits, and while this score cannot compete with Kraemer's fantastic entry, it's more enjoyable than the remainder".

== Notes ==
- ^{^a} Contain interpolations of "Theme from Mission: Impossible" composed by Lalo Schifrin
- ^{^b} Contain interpolations of "The Plot" composed by Lalo Schifrin'
- ^{^c} Contain a sample of “Chakra #1” written and performed by Constance Demby
- ^{^d} Contain a sample of “Chakra #5” written and performed by Constance Demby
- ^{^e} Contain a sample of “Chakra #3” written and performed by Constance Demby
