= Mission: Impossible – Rogue Nation (soundtrack) =

Mission: Impossible – Rogue Nation (Music from the Motion Picture)

Soundtrack album by Joe Kraemer
- Released: July 24, 2015
- Studios: Abbey Road Studios, London; British Grove Studios, London
- Genre: Film score
- Length: 73:21
- Labels: Paramount Music; La-La Land Records
- Producers: Joe Kraemer; John Finkley

Joe Kraemer chronology
Dawn Patrol (2014)	Mission: Impossible – Rogue Nation (Music from the Motion Picture) (2015)	Comrade Detective (2017)

Mission: Impossible – Rogue Nation (Music from the Motion Picture) is the score album to the 2015 film Mission: Impossible – Rogue Nation. The fifth installment in the Mission: Impossible film series, starring Tom Cruise, and the sequel to Mission: Impossible – Ghost Protocol (2011), the film is directed by Christopher McQuarrie and featured musical score composed by Joe Kraemer, who composed for McQuarrie's previous films, The Way of the Gun (2000) and Jack Reacher (2012). The album was released digitally on July 24, 2015, by Paramount Music, and the physical version of the soundtrack was released by La-La Land Records on the same day.

== Development ==
McQuarrie asked Kramer to provide the musical accompaniment for the Rogue Nation's soundtrack, based on their experience working together in their previous collaborations. Kraemer saw this as an opportunity to bring a score with a considerable dose of class and style, as he was previously known for scoring independent films. The soundtrack was recorded with small orchestral sections at British Grove Studios and with full orchestra at Abbey Road Studios.

As with all the films from the previous instalments, Lalo Schifrin's themes from the original television series were incorporated to the score. Kraemer wanted to pay homage to the original show, while ensuring that the sound would still be relevant to today's audiences.He decided to focus only on the use of the instruments that were available in 1966 and said: "And so, I went back and looked at the pilot, then many episodes from the early seasons. And decided that I would make a score that could have been recorded for the pilot, in the sense that I didn't want to use any sounds that weren't available to Lalo Schifrin when he scored it. Which meant no synthesisers, no drum machines, no techno loops. Everything was done with acoustic instruments recorded in a symphonic setting. Which is essentially how Lalo did the pilot. What I felt was that it would help me sound sort of retro but it wouldn't limit what I could write. It would only limit how I could achieve it."

While composing for the score, Kraemer took inspiration from minimalist composers like Philip Glass and Steve Reich, in order to do not break the rule that he set of only using instruments used by Schifrin during the 60s, as he felt that the high-tech sequence that involves a break-in to an underwater vault needed something electronic. He also used instruments in unconventional ways to create to new sounds for the soundtrack. For the underwater sequence, he used a piano with an extra octave at the lower end, and muffled the lowest string with a towel to produce a repetitive thumping sound like an engine.

== Release history ==
The score was digitally released by Paramount Music on July 24, 2015. The physical version of the soundtrack was released that same day by La-La Land Records.

== Reception ==
The score received positive reviews from critics. James Southall from Movie Wave wrote "This has been a film franchise which has attracted some fine music – I've enjoyed all the previous scores even in the films that didn't hit the mark – and Joe Kraemer has contributed something of real quality to it. Danny Elfman's score for the first one may remain the high water mark – but it's a close-run thing. Kraemer's music is intelligent, entertaining, old school in the best way, and sustains interest over the lengthy album. The physical release from La-La Land includes a few minutes more content than the download. I really liked Jack Reacher but in a contest (Kraemer vs Kraemer) this one's even better." Stefan Riedlinger from Amazing Movie Music wrote "The soundtrack is not the best action soundtrack this year, I still prefer “Jurassic World”, but you have to acknowledge that with Joe Kraemer, there is a fairly new face in the action genre who is able to use the full range of orchestral effects and has a great sense of drama and creating suspense."

Sean Wilson from MFiles wrote "That's why Kraemer's score is such a joy: the composer has stated that "retro" was the buzzword in crafting the music for Rogue Nation and he deliberately set out to avoid any electronic embellishments. The score is beautifully orchestrated with the various components of the orchestra playing off each other superbly, creating a dynamic and engaging soundscape that honours the great Lalo Schifrin. With its clutch of strong musical ideas, blistering action music and throwback tone, Rogue Nation is one of the 2015 summer season's best scores and deserves to catapult Kraemer to the top of the film music A-list. Mission accomplished!" David J. Moore from The Action Elite wrote "This soundtrack is not just a “must own” for soundtrack collectors, but even casual purveyors of film scores will enjoy listening to its action adventure sounds over and over again on repeat. It's the most re-playable Mission Impossible score so far."

== Track listing ==
All music is composed by Joe Kraemer.

No.	Title	Length
1.	"The A400^{[a]}^{[b]}"	6:38
2.	"Solomon Lane"	4:08
3.	"Good Evening, Mr. Hunt^{[a]}"	2:35
4.	"Escape to Danger^{[a]}^{[c]}"	2:46
5.	"Havana to Vienna^{[a]}^{[b]}"	5:13
6.	"A Flight at the Opera^{[a]}"	2:23
7.	"The Syndicate^{[a]}^{[b]}"	3:44
8.	"The Plan^{[a]}"	3:21
9.	"It's Impossible^{[a]}" (CD Exclusive Track)	1:23
10.	"The Torus^{[a]}^{[b]}"	7:02
11.	"Morocco Pursuit^{[a]}"	2:29
12.	"Grave Consequences^{[a]}"	4:12
13.	"A Matter of Going^{[a]}^{[c]}"	5:05
14.	"The Blenheim Sequence^{[a]}"	4:00
15.	"Audience with the Prime Minister^{[a]}"	4:23
16.	"This is the End, Mr. Hunt^{[b]}" (CD Exclusive Track)	3:48
17.	"A Foggy Night in London"	2:10
18.	"Meet the IMF^{[a]}"	1:47
19.	"Finale and Curtain Call^{[a]}^{[c]}"	6:14

== Charts ==
Chart (2015)	Peak position
UK Soundtrack Albums (OCC)	49

== Notes ==
- ^{^a} Contains an interpolation of "The Mission: Impossible Theme" by Lalo Schifrin
- ^{^b} Contains an interpolation of "The Plot (from Mission: Impossible TV Series)" by Lalo Schifrin
- ^{^c} Contains an interpolation of "Nessun dorma" (from Turandot) by Giacomo Puccini
