= Jeremy Culver =

American filmmaker (born 1976)

- Born: Jeremy E. Culver; January 6, 1976 (age 50); Honolulu, Hawaii, U.S.
- Occupations: Film director, screenwriter, producer
- Years active: 2012–present
- Spouse: Charleene Closshey

Jeremy Culver (born January 6, 1976) is an American film director, screenwriter and producer. He wrote, directed, and produced the indie film No Postage Necessary (2018) and the holiday film An Evergreen Christmas (2014). No Postage Necessary holds notoriety as the first film in history to release via blockchain technology available to stream using cryptocurrency.

== Career ==
Culver came to the entertainment industry later in life, not taking a traditional film school route. He earned a commercial production degree from Kutztown University of Pennsylvania and later entered the family business of multimedia computer-based training.

In 2012, Culver wrote, directed, and produced the musical Feather: A Musical Portrait which debuted in Queensland, Australia originally under the titled “Catharsis.” In 2013, the production was invited to show off-broadway at the New York Musical Theatre Festival

In 2013, Culver directed and produced feature film An Evergreen Christmas, a script he penned with sister Morgen Culver. The film starred Charleene Closshey, Academy Award nominee Robert Loggia, Naomi Judd, Tyler Ritter, Greer Grammer, Booboo Stewart and Jake Sandvig. Culver was nominated for Best Director at the California Independent Film Festival, where the film also received Best Picture and Best Actress nominations. It later played at AMFM Fest, receiving the Audience Choice Award. The film was distributed by Arc Entertainment.

In 2015, Culver was hired to direct his first full-length documentary film “Radical Kindness: The Life of Monsignor John Sheridan”. The film was narrated by parishioner Martin Sheen with music by Matthias Weber, and reflects the life and works of Irish Catholic Priest Monsignor Sheridan who served Southern California for decades as a priest, religious broadcaster, author, and poet. Culver accepted the Gabriel Award and Catholics in Media Award for his work.

Culver wrote, directed and produced romantic comedy No Postage Necessary as his second narrative feature. The film stars George Blagden, Charleene Closshey, Robbie Kay, Stelio Savante, with Michael Beach and Raymond J. Barry. Principal photography began in Plant City, FL in August 2016 filming on 35mm film, a rarity for an indie film of its size and budget. The film initially premiered on October 14, 2017, as an Official Selection of the Heartland Film Festival. Culver then presented the final version June 28, 2018 at the Tampa Theatre in Hillsborough County, Florida where the movie was exclusively filmed, serving as the Florida Premiere.

No Postage Necessary premiered in select U.S. theaters on July 6, 2018 as well as on the decentralized application Vevue. The bitcoin-themed movie became the first film to be released using blockchain technology and available to stream using cryptocurrency as payment. Given its groundbreaking release, Culver's script is now part of the Core Collection of the Margaret Herrick Library at the Academy of Motion Picture Arts and Sciences.

Culver co founded production company Two Roads Picture Co. in 2016 now specializing in blockchain film distribution with partner Charleene Closshey, breaking ground with the premiere blockchain film release in July 2018. Culver was an early adopter of bitcoin and blockchain technology. In 2018, Culver joined the board of directors and serves as Head of Premium Content for decentralized application Vevue.

== Athletics ==
Culver was a Men's Track and Field athlete, specializing in sprints and jumps. He was inducted into Kutztown University of Pennsylvania Athletic Hall of Fame in 2013.

Culver was a two-time Most Valuable Male Track & Field Athlete at the Eastern College Athletic Conference Indoor Championships, leading alma mater Kutztown University to two championships (1997 and 1998). He was a triple winner at both the 1997 and 1998 meets, winning the 200m, 400m and the 4 × 400 m relay. He currently ranks on five of Kutztown University's Indoor All-Time Top 10 lists and ranks second in the 400m, 500m, and in the 4 × 400 m relay. Culver's 4 × 400 m team held the school-record from 1997 to 2003.

During the outdoor season, Culver helped lead Kutztown to a Pennsylvania State Athletic Conference Championship in 1998 and a runner-up finish in 1999. He was the 1999 PSAC Champion in the 200m, 400m and as a member of the winning 4 × 100 m relay team. He was second at the 1996 and 1998 PSAC Championships in the 400m, and second at the 1996 championships in the 4 × 400 m relay. In 1999, he was a National Collegiate Athletic Association Provisional qualifier in the decathlon. He currently ranks on two of KU's Outdoor All-Time Top 10 lists and ranks second in the 400m.

Culver was a 1994 AAA State Champion in the Boy's 400 metres at the Pennsylvania Interscholastic Athletic Association Championships, running a 47.94 time.

== Personal life ==
Culver lives with his wife, Charleene Closshey in Plant City, Florida and writes with his sister Morgen Culver in Nashville, TN.

== Filmography ==
=== Film ===
Year	Title	Director	Producer	Writer	Notes
2012	Walking with Francis	Yes	Yes	Story	Short film based on poem by Richard Mitchell
2014	An Evergreen Christmas	Yes	Yes	Yes	Co-written by Jeremy Culver and Morgen Culver, Produced with Kim Waltrip
2015	Radical Kindness: The Life of Monsignor John Sheridan	Yes	Yes	Yes	Documentary; Co-written by Jeremy Culver and Morgen Culver, Narrated by Martin Sheen
2017	No Postage Necessary	Yes	Yes	Yes	Produced with Charleene Closshey
2019	The Past is Never Dead	No	Executive	No	First and only authorized William Faulkner documentary
