= Charleene Closshey =

American actress (born 1981)

- Closshey in September 2014
- Occupations: Actress, singer, violinist, composer, producer
- Years active: 2009–present
- Known for: No Postage Necessary, An Evergreen Christmas, Once
- Spouse: Jeremy Culver

Charleene Closshey (born January 15, 1981) is an American stage and screen actress, musician, composer, and producer. She is known for her starring roles in the romantic-comedy feature No Postage Necessary (2018) and the holiday film An Evergreen Christmas (2014). Closshey made her Broadway debut in the musical Once. Closshey has also produced No Postage Necessary, the first film released via blockchain technology, with writer-director Jeremy Culver.

Closshey has released music albums including Christmas Time is Here, An Evergreen Christmas: Music from the Motion Picture, Talk About Love: Music from the Motion Picture “No Postage Necessary”, Smile, Glimpse and Aligned: A Planetary Mantra and Gong Shower.

== Early life ==
Closshey was raised in Plant City, Florida, and started playing piano and reading music at age 2. She spent much of her childhood learning to play various instruments, including the flute, clarinet, harp, and viola.

Closshey graduated valedictorian of her high school class at Lois Cowles Harrison Center for the Visual and Performing Arts in Lakeland, Florida, in 1999, where she was president of the National Honor Society and her senior class. She subsequently obtained a Bachelor of Science degree with summa cum laude honors and concentrations in both marketing management and exercise science from Florida Southern College in 2002. She continued her artistic education in extension courses through the Juilliard School, Circle in the Square Theatre School, New York University, and Berklee College of Music.

=== Pageantry ===
Closshey competed in the Miss Florida America pageants, winning Miss Orlando, Miss Tampa and Miss Tampa Bay. She won preliminary talent and was top ten at Miss Florida, receiving multiple academic and community service awards.

=== Business ===
Following her 2002 graduation from Florida Southern College, Closshey cofounded Ideas & Innovations, a strategic consulting and marketing management firm.

== Career ==
=== Acting ===
In 2014, Closshey joined the cast of the Broadway musical Once, understudying the roles of Reza and Ex-Girlfriend. She made her debut on April 8, 2014 onstage at the Bernard B. Jacobs Theatre, the same stage where Madonna, Sean "P. Diddy" Combs, and Julia Roberts all made their Broadway debuts (1988, 2004, and 2006 respectively).

Closshey appeared in the 2012 thriller A Thousand Cuts starring Michael O'Keefe. She then starred in the holiday film An Evergreen Christmas in 2013, opposite Robert Loggia and Naomi Judd. Closshey starred in and produced 2018 indie dramedy No Postage Necessary with George Blagden, Robbie Kay, Stelio Savante, with Michael Beach and Raymond J. Barry which released in theaters across the United States July 6, 2018.

In 2012, Closshey starred in and executive produced the short film "Walking with Francis", written and directed by Jeremy Culver, recounting the last days of the man who would become St. Francis of Assisi.

Closshey and Culver later created the musical Feather, which was subsequently invited to show during the 2013 New York Musical Theatre Festival held Off Broadway at the Pershing Square Signature Center in the Alice Griffin Jewel Box Theatre.

=== Music ===
Closshey trained classically, studying her primary instruments of violin (beginning at age 12), piano (age 2), and voice (age 24). She played violin with artists including Josh Groban, Charlie Daniels, Mannheim Steamroller, Frank Sinatra, Jr., and the Trans-Siberian Orchestra among others. After Closshey began classical vocal training, she soon thereafter sang in Rome, Italy with the Operafestival di Roma and with the St. Petersburg Opera in productions of La bohème and Die Fledermaus (Sally).

In 2011, Closshey released the jazz cabaret album Smile. Her first instrumental album, Glimpse was released in 2012, was commissioned for yoga sessions at the 13th Annual Association of Comprehensive Energy Psychology conference.

Closshey scored the films No Postage Necessary, An Evergreen Christmas, and Walking with Francis.

In 2022, Closshey released her album Aligned: A Planetary Mantra and Gong Shower. In this album, she has combined NASA-recorded space sounds with ambient compositions music tuned to the mathematically-calculated frequencies of the planets, planetary gongs, and Sanskrit mantras.

== Awards and recognition ==
Closshey was appointed to the Florida Film and Entertainment Advisory Council. In 2005, she was awarded "30 Under 30" by the Tampa Bay Business Journal.

Her album Aligned: A Planetary Mantra & Gong Shower won Best Ambient/New Age song at the 2022 Hollywood Music in Media Awards and received two gold medals and one silver medal at the 2023 COVR Awards.

== Philanthropy and activism ==
Closshey supports animal-rescue organizations and other charitable causes. She frequently supports the Spring of Tampa Bay, and has sponsored a golden Labrador puppy throughout her training to become a seeing eye dog through Southeastern Guide Dogs.
