= Rudolf Buitendach =

South African film director and editor

- Citizenship: South Africa
- Occupations: Film director and editor

Rudolf Buitendach (or Rudolf B.) is a South African born film director and editor.

== Works ==
Buitendach's short film Indoor Fireworks, produced by Sleevemonkey Films, was the world's first fully uncompressed film shot on the Viper filmstream camera and lauded by such artists as filmmaker Darren Aronofsky and composer Angelo Badalamenti (who scored the film). It was picked up by Canal Plus for European distribution.

His short Rearview was nominated by BBC Three as best short of 2006 in their new talent strand and also screened at the LA International Shortsfest and Brief Encounters. It was shortlisted by the Amsterdam Fantastic Film Festival for a Golden Melies nomination and also screened in Cannes and Venice. In 2007 he was a finalist in the filmaka.com international filmmaking competition.

Buitendach also works as a film trailer editor and creative director. His trailer for The Brotherhood of the Wolf was nominated for a Golden Trailer Award in 2002. In 2007 he was nominated for two Golden Trailer Awards for best International drama trailer for Snowcake and for best Comedy Trailer for Waiter. In 2008 he worked on the trailer for the Joy Division biopic Control; the trailer was nominated for a Key Art award.

Buitendach has worked in tandem with such directors as Werner Herzog, Mike Leigh, Mike Hodges, Peter Greenaway, Alexi Tan, Richard Linklater, and Pedro Almodóvar on their trailers and has cut trailers for all the major studios and distributors.

In 2009, Buitendach directed a documentary about Arsenal's 2008–2009 season.

In 2011, he directed his debut feature film, Dark Hearts, starring Lucas Till, Kyle Schmid, Sonja Kinski, Juliet Landau, Rachel Blanchard and Goran Visnjic. Dark Hearts was nominated as Best International Feature at the 2012 Raindance Film Festival in London.

In 2013, Buitendach directed his sophomore feature, Where the Road Runs Out, making history as this was the first feature film ever to be made in Equatorial Guinea. The film starred the César Award-winning actor Isaach De Bankolé, Juliet Landau and Stelio Savante. The film had its world premiere at the San Diego International Film Festival, and won the 2014 Grand Jury Award for Best Film against the Academy Award-winning film The Imitation Game, Academy Award nominee Wild, and Golden Globe Award nominated St. Vincent. He received his reward from Academy Award nominee Tom Berenger. Where the Road Runs Out also won the United Tribune Award for Best Film. Recently, the film won the Black Reel Award for Outstanding World Cinema amongst fellow winners Moonlight and Fences.

In 2015, he won the Best Director Award at the Sunscreen Film Festival in Florida, sponsored by the Academy of Motion Picture Arts and Sciences. His award was presented by four-time Grammy Award winner Stanley Clarke. His film also won the Best Actor Award for De Bankolé.

In 2015, Rudolf edited and produced the environmental film Medicine of the Wolf, the aim of which was to try and save the aforementioned animals from extinction. The film featured Jane Goodall and Jim Brandenburg. The film won the Grand Jury Prize for best film at the Arizona International Film Festival and the Audience Award at the St. Paul/Minneapolis International Film Festival.

In 2016, he finished his third feature as director, Selling Isobel (released as Apartment 407) based on true events, with Frida Farrell playing herself as a sex trafficking victim. The film also stars Lew Temple and Alyson Stoner. The film won the Breakout Film Award at the San Diego International Film Festival, Best Indie Feature at the 2016 Raindance Film Festival, Best Non-European Feature at the ECU Film Festival in Paris and Best Film at the California Women's Film Festival. It had a limited theatrical release in the US and Scandinavia.

In 2018, he completed his fourth feature film, Hex, filmed in Cambodia, his first as writer-director. The film stars British-American actress Jenny Boyd as well as Ross McCall.
