= Stelio Savante =

South African actor

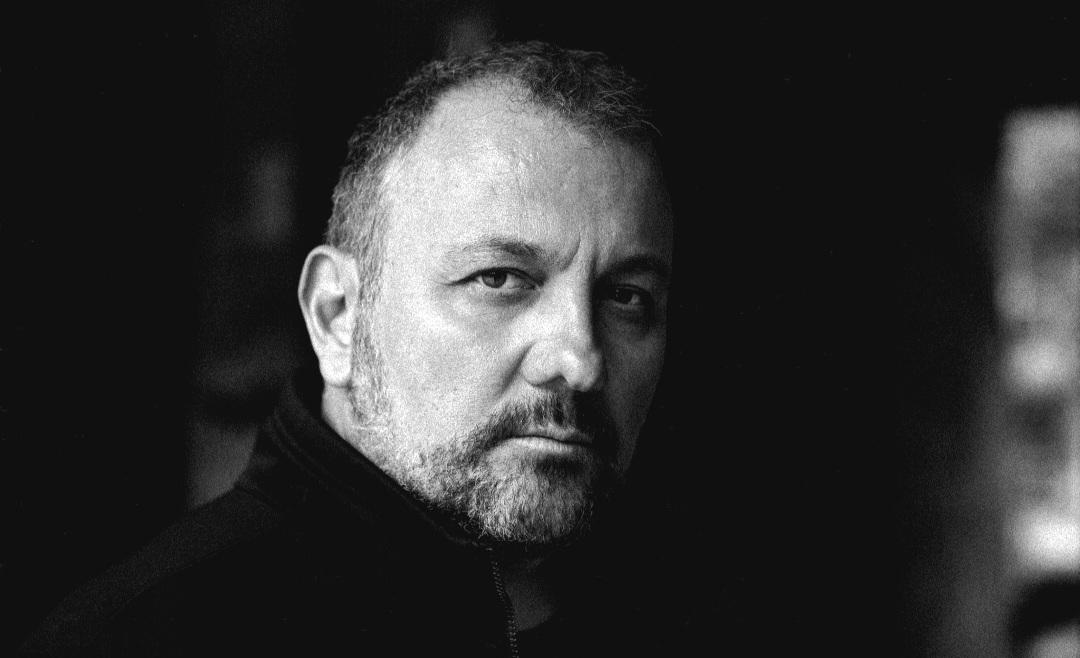
- Born: 24 April 1970 (age 56); Cape Town, South Africa
- Occupations: Actor; producer
- Years active: 1996–present
- Known for: Ugly Betty; My Super Ex-Girlfriend; Sarah's Oil; Colors of Heaven; Running for Grace; Call of Duty: Black Ops 4 The Chosen

Stelio Savante (born 24 April 1970), a South African actor.

Following two decades of Lort contract theater, his roles in television series and films, include starring with Zachary Levi, and Sonequa Martin-Green, in the Amazon MGM biopic Sarah's Oil, opposite Elizabeth Tabish and Elizabeth Mitchell in the immigrant drama Between Borders, with Matt Dillon in the Hawaiian drama Running for Grace, opposite Anne Heche, in her final film performance in the noir What Remains, with Jim Caviezel and Claudia Karvan in the political thriller Infidel, and in the South African epic drama Colors of Heaven.

In 2007 he became the first male South African-born Screen Actors Guild award nominee (Best Ensemble in a Comedy) for his recurring role on Ugly Betty followed by roles in the studio films My Super Ex-Girlfriend and Starship Troopers 3: Marauder. He is also known for the roles of Moses in the biblical series The Chosen, and the voice of Ajax in the video games Call of Duty: Black Ops 4 and Call of Duty: Mobile.

== Early life ==
A Capetonian of Greek, Italian, British, Ashkenazi, and Anatolian descent, his grandfather was a racing driver who placed and won medals at the 1955 Monte Carlo Rally.

== Career ==
His prime-time debut came in police procedural crime drama television series Law & Order: Special Victims Unit as a Bosnian–Muslim fundamentalist. Directed by Juan Jose Campanella and starring with Bradley Cooper, the episode was nominated for an Emmy. Recurred as Steve on comedy-drama television series Ugly Betty, produced by Salma Hayek. He became the first male South African to receive a Screen Actor's Guild nomination along with the lead ensemble cast in 2007.

Further television credits include S.W.A.T., FBI, Law & Order: Criminal Intent with Annabella Sciorra, The Sopranos, as Dan 'Schaffy' Schaffner in Jim Breuer's pilot Pulp Comics on Comedy Central and recurring as Antonio on Late Night with Conan O'Brien. He portrayed Joe Masseria in the mini-series The Making of the Mob: New York for AMC and David Sarnoff in American Genius for National Geographic.

Additionally a lead role with Isaach De Bankole and Juliet Landau in Rudolf Buitendach's 2014 drama film Where the Road Runs Out, the first feature filmed in Equatorial Guinea, winner of the Best Narrative Feature Award at the 2014 San Diego Film Festival and the Black Reel Award for Outstanding World Cinema in 2017. He also starred in Peter Greenaway's 2015 biographical film Eisenstein in Guanajuato nominated for the Golden Bear at the 2015 Berlin International Film Festival.

Also appeared in the 2011 feature A Million Colours.

== Films and plays produced ==
Savante has produced and served in a producing role on such films as No Postage Necessary, Official Selection of the Heartland Film Festival starring George Blagden and Michael Beach, making history as the first film to ever release via blockchain technology using cryptocurrency as payment.

To commemorate the tenth anniversary of the September 11 attacks he produced and performed 110 Stories Celebrity Benefit Performances with Katie Holmes, Samuel L. Jackson, Melissa Leo, Cynthia Nixon, and Jeremy Piven. at the Skirball Center for The Performing Arts at NYU. It was directed by Gregory Mosher. Savante describes 110 Stories as a chance to give people closure about the attacks; he was in New York City at the time of the attacks, and cites that as a reason why he produces the play. In 2010, he also produced and performed the Los Angeles theater debut of 110 Stories Celebrity Benefit Performances at the Geffen Playhouse, with John Hawkes and Ed Asner directed by Mark Freiburger. Proceeds were donated to the Red Cross Los Angeles as aid to Haiti in the aftermath of their earthquake. In 2013, he produced and performed 110 Stories at Ebony Rep in Los Angeles. The proceeds were donated to Operation Gratitude. And again he produced and performed 110 Stories opposite Robert Forster and Mira Sorvino directed by his acting teacher Bill Alderson in 2016. As playwright, his one-act play Venom was self-produced Off Broadway and nominated as a finalist for Samuel French's Love Creek festival.

== Personal life ==
Savante was diagnosed with Celiac Disease in 2010 and has become a vocal advocate for other sufferers. He stated that the disease attacked his organs, including his liver. He was also diagnosed with Hashimoto's thyroiditis in 2013. Savante is a Christian.

== Awards and nominations ==
Year	Awards	Category	Work	Outcome
2007	Screen Actors Guild Award	Outstanding Performance by an Ensemble in a Comedy Series	Ugly Betty	Nominated
2014	San Diego Film Festival	Best Narrative Feature (shared with Rudolf Buitendach)	Where The Road Runs Out	Won
2015	Berlin International Film Festival	Teddy Ballot Volkswagen Audience Award	Eisenstein in Guanajuato	Nominated
2015	The Short Film Awards SOFIE Award	Best Actor in a Short Film	Once We Were Slaves	Won
2015	American Movie Award	Best Actor	Once We Were Slaves	Won
2015	Bare Bones International Film Festival	Best Actor in a Short Film	Once We Were Slaves	Nominated
2015	Attic Film Festival	Best Male Performance	Once We Were Slaves	Nominated
2015	International Christian Film Festival	Best Actor in a Short Film	Once We Were Slaves	Nominated
2016	Philadelphia Independent Film Festival	Best Actor	Once We Were Slaves	Nominated
2018	Manhattan Film Festival	Best Comedic Drama Feature	Avalanche	Won
2021	Manhattan Film Festival	Best Horror Feature	Destination Marfa	Won
2022	Political Film Society Award for Peace	Best Film	Pulled From Darkness	Nominated
2024	Austin Film Festival	Narrative Feature Award	Summer Of Violence	Nominated
2024	Downtown Los Angeles Film Festival	Best Picture	Summer Of Violence	Won

== Filmography ==
Year	Project	Role	Notes
1995–1996	Late Night with Conan O'Brien	Antonio	2 Episodes
1996	Close Up	Frankie	
1998	Pulp Comics: The Jim Breuer Show	Dan Schaffner	1 Episode
2000	Astoria	Nick	US & Greece Theatrical
2000	The Sopranos	Gaetano Giarizzio	1 Episode: "Full Leather Jacket"
2000	Guiding Light	Mr Black	2 Episodes
2001	A Beautiful Mind	Lab Technician	Worldwide Release
2003	All My Children	Guard Berger	7 Episodes
2003	Midnight Club II	Primo	Video Game
2005	Law & Order: Criminal Intent	Phil Bartoli	1 Episode: "Unchained"
2005	Law & Order: Special Victims Unit	Milan Zergin	1 Episode: "Night"
2006	My Super Ex Girlfriend	Leo	Worldwide Release
2007	NCIS	Danny Coyle	1 Episode: "Requiem"
2007	Ugly Betty	Steve	Recurring; 8 Episodes
2008	My Own Worst Enemy: Conspiracy Theory	Oliver Chelovich / John Bentley	2 Episodes
2008	Corrado	Antonio	Worldwide Release
2008	Command & Conquer: Red Alert 3	Sergei	Video Game
2008	Starship Troopers 3: Marauder	"Bull" Brittles	Video
2009	Red Alert 3: Uprising	Sergei	Video Game
2009	Without a Trace	Dimitri Melvychenko	1 Episode: "Heartbeats"
2010	Undercovers	Hollis Kruger	1 Episode: "Instructions"
2010	Mass Effect 2	Eclipse Security Guard	Video Game; Stolen Memory DLC
2010	Army of Two: The 40th Day	Russian Elite / Russian Grunt / SA Guard / SA Elite / SA Grunt	Video Game
2010	A Million Colours	Major Shawn Dixon	Worldwide Release
2010	The Suite Life on Deck	Stefan	1 episode: "Breakup in Paris"
2010	What If...	Joel	Worldwide Release
2010	Finding Hope Now	Ruben	
2011	Uncharted 3: Drake's Deception	Indian Ocean Pirates / Various Characters	Video Game
2011	A Million Colours	Major Shawn Dixon	
2012	Where the Road Runs Out	Martin	
2012	Tom Clancy's Ghost Recon: Future Soldier	Nigerian Mercenary / Additional Voices	Video Game
2012	Breakout Kings	Malko	1 Episode: "Double Down"
2013	Jimmy	Mr. Laney	
2013	Selling Isobel	Alfonso	
2013	The Secret Village	Joe	
2013	Awakened	Benny	
2014	Once We Were Slaves	Demas	
2014	Pacific Standard Time	Marius Roos	
2014	Person of Interest	Aris Zappo	1 Episode
2015	American Genius	David Sarnoff	
2015	Togetherness	Yanni	Episode
2015	Eisenstein in Guanajuato	Hunter S. Kimbrough	
2015	The Making of the Mob: New York	Joe Masseria	2 episodes
2016	Cassidy Way	Truck Driver	
2016	Apartment 407	Alfonso	
2016	Media	Howard Boston	Television Movie
2016	Call of Duty: Infinite Warfare	Shoreline Mercenary	Video Game
2016	Uncharted 4: A Thief's End	Villain Sniper	Video Game
2017	Odious	Eddie	
2017	Blood in the Water	Marius Roos	
2017	Army Dog	Sheriff Bill	
2017	Uncharted: The Lost Legacy	Shoreline Mercenary	Video Game
2017	Windsor	Pierre Gandy	
2017	Pronoia	Jeff	short
2018	Running for Grace	Mayor	Blue Fox, Netflix
2018	Call of Duty: Black Ops 4	Ajax	Video Game
2018	No Postage Necessary	Agent Ames	
2018	Arrested Development	"Gator"	Episode
2018	Death House	Dr. Roos	
2018	The Haves and the Have Nots	Dino Malone	Episode
2018	The Cleaning Lady	Michael	
2019	Bernie the Dolphin	Brock Winters	Lionsgate
2019	I Am That Man	Detective Olsen	On Demand
2019	The Message (Camp Arrowhead)	Gerald Walker	On Demand
2019	Rapid Eye Movement	Steve Larabee	Theatrical
2020	The Penitent Thief	Tiran	Amazon, On Demand; also producer
2020	The Chosen	Moses	PeacockTV
2020	Infidel	Pierre Barthes	Cloudburst, Universal
2021	Pups Alone	Lenny	Theatrical, Saban, Paramount
2021	Under the Stadium Lights	Producer	Theatrical, Saban, Paramount
2021	Destination Marfa	Vincent, The Hitchhiker	Released on DVD, Amazon, and Vudu
2022	Angry Neighbors	Damenial Krento	Lionsgate; also producer
2022	What Remains	Scott	STARZ, Gravitas Ventures; also executive producer
2022	Find Her	Feliz Leonard	Streaming; also producer
2022	Pursuit Of Freedom	Bedros	Theatrical, PureFlix
2022	Blackwood	Henri	Theatrical, SABAN
2022	Brut Force	Cuco	Streaming, XYZ
2023	Captain Fall	The Butterfly Thug	Netflix
2023	FBI	Fabian Shabani	CBS
2023	Nefarious	Detective Russo	Theatrical Release
2023	Mobking	Big Bill	Theatrical Release
2024	Saint Nick of Bethlehem	Harvey	Streaming
2024	Between Borders	Duane	Streaming
2024	Undefiled	Manager Joe Baines	Streaming
2025	Sarah's Oil	Earl Raskin	Theatrical Release
2025	S.W.A.T.	Omar Marina	CBS
2026	Bloodhound	Detective Max Crane	Post Production
