= Susan Landau (disambiguation) =

Susan Landau may refer to:

- Susan Landau (born 1954), mathematician and computer scientist
- Susan Landau Finch, born Susan Meredith Landau, film producer, writer, and director
- Susan B. Landau (1952–2017), American film and television producer
