= Two Roads Picture Co. =

American independent film production company

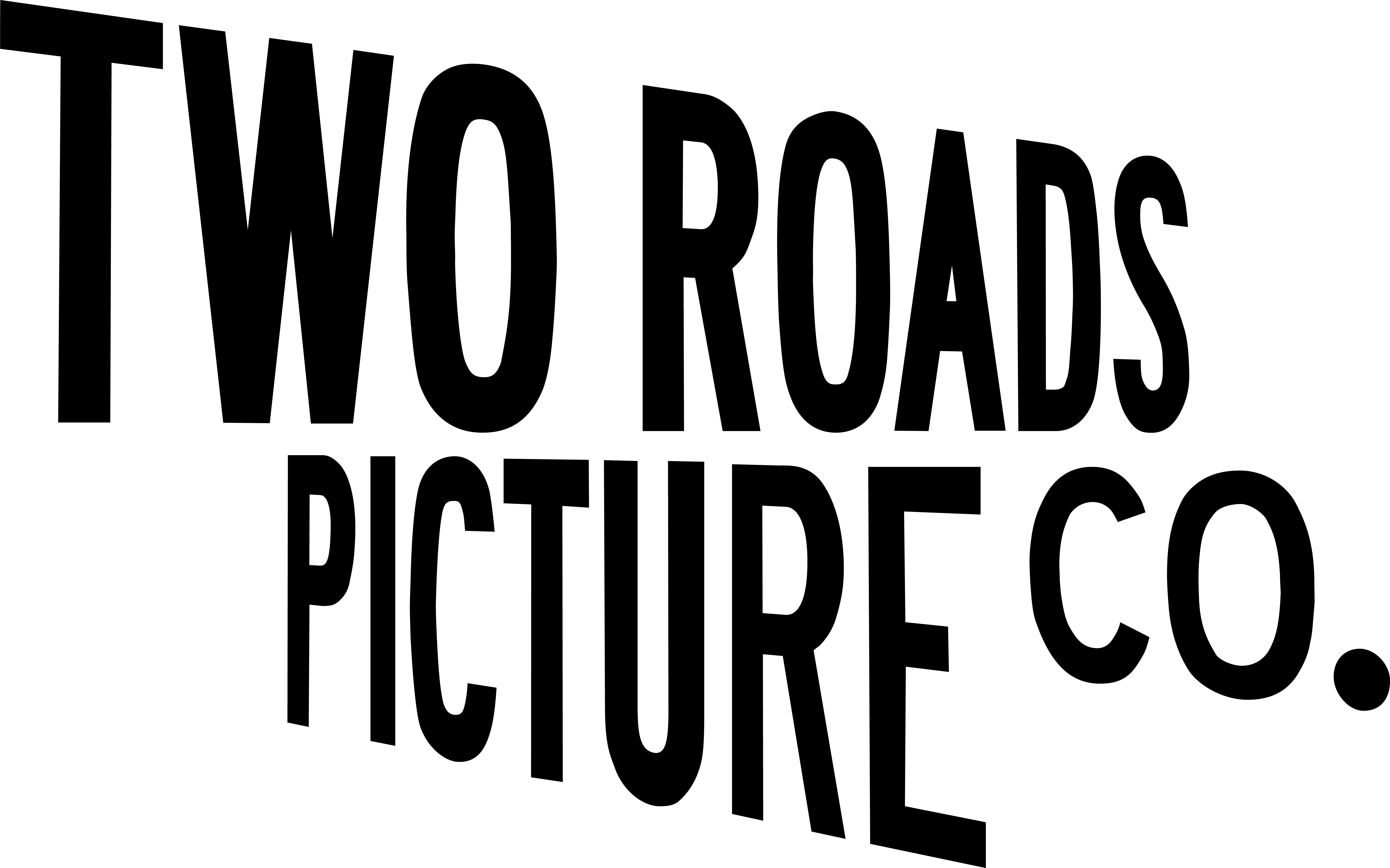
- Industry: Motion Picture, Creative Industries
- Founded: 2016
- Founders: Charleene Closshey; Jeremy Culver
- Services: Film production; Music production; Theatre; Blockchain Distribution (BVOD)
- Owner: Jeremy Culver; Charleene Closshey
- Divisions: Film, Music, Blockchain Distribution
- Website: tworoadspictureco.com

Two Roads Picture Co. is an American independent film production company founded in 2016 by Charleene Closshey and Jeremy Culver. It produced and released the first film in history able to be streamed for cryptocurrency using blockchain technology, the company's first feature film titled No Postage Necessary.

== History ==
The Florida incorporated company began in 2016 Closshey and Culver co-produced the 2018 film No Postage Necessary. For the blockchain debut, the company partnered with decentralized application Vevue, a peer-to-peer incentivized video network built on the QTUM platform and utilizing smart contracts. The company also distributed the film in the United States, screening in select U.S. theaters July 6, 2018 and available digitally online July 10, 2018. In 2018, Two Roads Picture Co. launched a blockchain distribution division of the company headed by Jeremy Culver.

== Filmography ==
Year	Film	Director	Release date	Notes
2013	Walking with Francis	Jeremy Culver	17 October 2013	Screened in Vatican City by Pope Francis
2014	An Evergreen Christmas	Jeremy Culver	4 November 2014	Distributed by Arc Entertainment (U.S.) and Spotlight Pictures (foreign)
2015	Radical Kindness: The Life of Monsignor John Sheridan	Jeremy Culver	4 September 2014	Documentary chronicling the life of Irish American poet, author and priest
2018	No Postage Necessary	Jeremy Culver	6 July 2018	First film in history to release via blockchain technology
