= Running for Grace =

2018 film directed by David L. Cunningham

- Theatrical release poster
- Directed by: David L. Cunningham
- Written by: Christian Parkes; David L. Cunningham
- Produced by: Edwin Marshall; David L. Cunningham
- Starring: Matt Dillon; Jim Caviezel; Ryan Potter
- Cinematography: Akis Konstantakopoulos
- Edited by: Kyle Gilbertson
- Music by: Elia Cmiral
- Production company: Kona Snow Pictures
- Distributed by: Blue Fox Entertainment
- Release date: July 20, 2018
- Running time: 110 minutes
- Country: United States
- Language: English
- Box office: $89,988

Running for Grace is a 2018 American romance film directed by David L. Cunningham based on the original screenplay by Christian Parkes. The film stars Matt Dillon, Jim Caviezel and Ryan Potter. The film was released on August 17, 2018 in the United States.

The film was shot on location in Hawaii and at Kona-based Honua Studios. It was originally known as Jo, the Medicine Runner.

== Plot ==
The film is set in the Kona Coffee Belt of Hawaii during the 1920s. Japanese immigrant laborers and the white upperclass live in a rigidly classist society. Jo, an orphan of mixed-race lineage, finds himself ostracized by both groups until Doc, a white doctor from the mainland, is hired as a physician for workers on the plantation owned by Mr. Danielson. Doc has Jo run medicine and translate for him on the island.

Ten years later, Jo falls in love with the plantation owner's daughter, Grace. They interact a few times at the Danielson's home under the guise of treating her ankle injury. Mr. Danielson meets a new doctor, Dr. Reyes, and invites him to tend to the white upperclass residents of the island, even as his company is going bankrupt. Throughout this time, Doc has been taking several secret trips to see a lawyer in Hilo about formally adopting Jo, even though it was illegal at that time to adopt a mixed-race child. Jo at first is impressed by the new doctor and his car, a Ford Model T, and asks him to take him on as an assistant. However, when they go to treat Mr. Danielson's accountant, who had poisoned himself as a suicide attempt, Jo realizes that the doctor is a charlatan. Dr. Reyes later expresses a romantic interest in Grace, and her father, seeing it as an opportunity to save his plantation and way of life, encourages the proposal.

Mr. Danielson sets out on a trip to Hilo to discuss his looming bankruptcy with the bank, intending to inform them that Grace is marrying into a wealthy family. Along the way, he accidentally falls into a ditch and hits his head. Doc and Jo are the first to reach him and, on inspection, Doc fears Mr. Danielson's head injury is severe. He tells Jo to find Dr. Reyes so that they can use his motorcar to transport him. At his home, Mr. Danielson and his mother insist Dr. Reyes treat his injury and that Doc and Jo leave. Moments later, Grace comes crying out of the house announcing that her father is dead. Grace's grandmother and Dr. Reyes watch Grace and Jo embrace, and Grace's grandmother scolds Grace and pulls her away.

That night, Doc and Jo are walking back to their house. Along the way, Dr. Reyes purposefully chases them in his car and tries to run them over. Doc manages to push Jo out of the way, but gets hit himself and dies shortly afterward. Dr. Reyes threatens to kill Jo if he doesn't leave town. Later, Jo returns to his mother's house and is found by the Hilo lawyer who informs him that Doc's adoption was a success. Jo runs to the scheduled wedding between Dr. Reyes and Grace and asks for her hand in marriage. Grace's caretaker of several years, Miss Hanabusa, approves the proposal and informs everyone that Mr. Danielson was bankrupt.

== Cast ==
- Matt Dillon as "Doc"
- Jim Caviezel as Doctor Reyes
- Ryan Potter as Jo
- Olivia Ritchie as Grace Danielson
- Nick Boraine as Mr. Danielson
- Rumi Oyama as Miss Hanabusa
- Juliet Mills as Grace's Grandmother
- Stelio Savante as Mayor
- Cole Takiue as Young Jo

== Release ==
The film was released two weeks early in Hawaii before it received its mainland release in the United States on Aug 17, 2018. The film first premiered in three movie theaters in Hawaii on July 20, 2018.

== Awards ==
The original screenplay The Medicine Runner by Christian Parkes was a 2003 Nicholl Fellowship Semi-Finalist.
