= A Million Colours =

- Directed by: Peter Bishai
- Written by: Peter Bishai; Andre Pieterse
- Produced by: Michael Mosca; Andre Pieterse
- Starring: Wandile Molebatsi; Jason Hartman; Masello Motana; Stelio Savante
- Cinematography: Trevor A Brown
- Edited by: Annie Ilkow
- Music by: Laurent Eyquem
- Distributed by: D Films (Canada) Nu Metro (South Africa)
- Release date: 27 September 2011 (Hollywood Black Film Festival)
- Running time: 120 minutes
- Countries: Canada; South Africa
- Language: English
- Budget: $6,000,000

A Million Colours, also called Colors of Heaven, is a 2011 film directed by Peter Bishai and co-written with Andre Pieterse. It is based on the lives of Muntu Ndebele and Norman Knox, actors in the film Forever Young, Forever Free, also known as e'Lollipop. It follows them from the success of the film around the time of the Soweto Uprising, through to the election of Nelson Mandela.

== Cast ==
- Wandile Molebatsi as Muntu Ndebele
- Jason Hartman as Norman Knox
- Masello Motana as Sabela
- Stelio Savante as Major Shawn Dixon

== Reception ==
One reviewer said of the film, "It is a tale of the exploration of morality, self-sacrifice, integrity and the conviction of one’s belief system. To those with an open mind it will offer a rich exploration of the past, but it is one that requires an appreciation of telling the story of the personal to take us inside the past, and bring child film star Muntu’s story to life."
