= No Postage Necessary =

2017 American romantic comedy movie

- Directed by: Jeremy Culver
- Screenplay by: Jeremy Culver
- Story by: Jeremy Culver and Morgen Culver
- Produced by: Jeremy Culver; Charleene Closshey
- Starring: George Blagden; Charleene Closshey; Robbie Kay; Stelio Savante; Michael Beach; Raymond J. Barry
- Cinematography: Jeff Osborne
- Edited by: Sandy S. Solowitz
- Music by: Charleene Closshey
- Production company: Two Roads Picture Co.
- Distributed by: Two Roads Picture Co.
- Release dates: October 14, 2017 (Heartland Film Festival); July 6, 2018 (United States)
- Running time: 104 minutes
- Country: United States
- Language: English

No Postage Necessary is a 2017 American romantic comedy independent film written and directed by Jeremy Culver as his second narrative feature and starring George Blagden, Charleene Closshey, Robbie Kay, Stelio Savante, with Michael Beach and Raymond J. Barry. The film integrates current political happenings — including the Silk Road (referred to "The Spice Trail" in the film's script), hacktivism, and cyberterrorism — into a dramedy set in Plant City, Florida.

Principal photography began in Plant City in August 2016 filming on 35mm film. The film initially premiered on October 14, 2017, as an Official Selection of the Heartland Film Festival. The shortened and final version later premiered on June 28, 2018, at the Tampa Theatre in Hillsborough County, Florida where the movie was filmed exclusively. It released in theaters in ten markets across the United States on July 6, 2018, by Two Roads Picture Co. as well as on the decentralized application Vevue, making history as the first film to ever release via blockchain technology and available to stream using cryptocurrency as payment. The film's script is now part of the Core Collection of the Margaret Herrick Library at the Academy of Motion Picture Arts and Sciences.

No Postage Necessary received mixed reviews, with praise for its heartfelt performances, music, production values, and ending that is "satisfying without artifice", but criticism suggesting it relies too heavily on its unique distribution strategy as its "hook".

== Plot ==
Brilliant computer hacker Sam Collins is on probation and barred from the internet; his parole officer is Harry. He steals from mailboxes and works at a local dessert shop with hacking cohort Stanley, now going by David and claiming to have undergone a spiritual awakening. When Sam steals a letter written by Josie to her dead Marine husband, he begins stalking her, stealing her letters, and finding the courage to introduce himself. FBI agent Ames accuses Sam of stealing Bitcoins, which were actually stolen by David, and are now lost. Sam and Josie begin to date tentatively.

When Sam hears about the job interview Harry arranges for him, he performs a social media attack to prove to his prospective employers he can tighten up their cybersecurity without having to use the Internet, which his probation terms prohibit him from doing. When Harry finds out, he scolds Sam. Ames increases pressure on Sam to relinquish the missing bitcoins, and goes on a hunt for Sam when he later finds out that his own personal bitcoin wallet has been emptied. Sam attempts to come clean to Josie. When Ames finds out that Sam has been stealing mail, he arrests Sam for the crime, interrupting his apology to Josie. Ames' departure is interrupted by the arrival of Harry and local police reinforcements, where Ames is arrested for money laundering.

Jack, Josie's father, consoles Josie, including the revelation that her letters to her late husband---all addressed to the Tomb of the Unknown Soldier---were always returned, because the Tomb receives no mail, and he kept them in a special box after taking out a post office box for them to be returned. Meanwhile, Harry recommends early parole release for Sam. David, now going by his real name Stanley, hacks into the Department of Justice in order to email Harry and take the blame for Sam's mail theft. Sam visits Josie at work, but she feels violated by how Sam has hacked into her life, but tells him of her plans to move to Nashville to enroll her daughter Daisy into a special education school. A month later, Josie receives an acceptance letter for Daisy to the school with an anonymous scholarship for Daisy's tuition and fees. Josie, Jack, and Daisy move to Nashville.

Sam interviews to enlist in the Army, offering his special computer intelligence skills, deciding to chase his dreams and while helping others. After he's accepted, he writes a letter to Josie, who smiles when receiving it, convinced that Sam is now becoming the man he wanted to be.

== Cast ==
Main

- George Blagden as Sam Collins, a tech genius and disaffected computer hacker who champions the underdog usually to his own detriment.
- Charleene Closshey as Josie Cartwright, a young war widow and single mother raising her 6-year-old daughter Daisy.
- Robbie Kay as Stanley, Sam's computer protege and partner in crime, searching for life's answers through spirituality.
- Stelio Savante as Special Agent Ames, an FBI officer investigating tech crimes and responsible for Sam's first run in with the law.
- Michael Beach as Harry, Sam's probation officer.
- Raymond J. Barry as Jack, Josie's father whose military background keeps him keenly aware of his daughter's struggles.

Supporting

- Michelle Moreno as Daisy Cartwright, Josie's daughter who has never met her deceased father and struggles in school.
- Matthew Cornwell as Larry Collins, Sam's older deadbeat brother who charges Sam excessive rent.
- Autumn Dial as Rachel, a co worker of Sam and Stanley at the local Twistee Treat who learns about Bitcoin via her online poker habits.

Additional

- Gareth Dunlop as Gareth, an Irish singer/songwriter who used to sing in a band with Josie.
- Fedor Steer as Tom, Josie's creepy co worker.
- Shandi Hampton as Nancy, Larry's girlfriend.
- Ricky Wayne as the Manic Man, trying to find honey made by bees.
- Marty Stonerock as the CEO.
- Matthew Sharp as the HR Guy.
- Tim Goodwin as the CIS officer.
- Peter Travis as the Receptionist.
- Margaret Murphy as the elementary school principal.
- Morgen Culver as the waitress.
- Jan Kerr as Jack's friendly neighbor.
- Chris Burns as Adam, a local catfishing creep.
- Darrin Ortiz as the Recruitment Officer.
- Sean Mahabir as the Police Officer.
- Omar Resto as the Security Officer.
- Lowrie Fawley as Barb.
- Vincenzo Hinckley as Michael, Josie's deceased husband, a Marine killed in War in Afghanistan.
- Charles Closshey as Pat the Bartender.

== Casting ==
The casting department included Sharon Howard-Field (known for her work in Grumpy Old Men, The Merchant of Venice, and Shine), Tara Feldstein and Chase Paris. (known for their work on Stranger Things).

Says director Jeremy Culver, "Sharon (Howard-Field) always had consistently brilliant ideas of actors who could play the various roles. Her strong opinions were matched by her keen eye for talent and insight into the various archetypes represented in the script. A director and casting director's relationship is unique as its usually the first step on the long road of creative collaboration - and as with every journey, it's important to get off on the right foot. Sharon provided this foundation for No Postage Necessary."

== Filming ==
Pre production on the film began in May 2016 in Hillsborough County, FL, and principal photography began on August 3, 2016, and wrapped August 21, 2016.

== Release ==
The film was released in theaters on July 6, 2018, in the United States. On July 10, 2018, the film released digitally in the United States and on the decentralized application Vevue, becoming the first film in history to release via blockchain technology and available to stream using cryptocurrency as payment.

No Postage Necessary was released on DVD and Blu-ray on October 2, 2018.
