= Barbara Bain =

American actress (born 1931)

- Bain in 1971
- Born: Mildred Fogel; September 13, 1931 (age 95); Chicago, Illinois, U.S.
- Education: University of Illinois Urbana-Champaign
- Occupations: Actress; dancer; model
- Years active: 1957–present
- Known for: Mission: Impossible; Space: 1999
- Spouse: Martin Landau (m. 1957; div. 1993)
- Children: Susan Landau Finch; Juliet Landau

Barbara Bain (born Mildred Fogel; September 13, 1931) is an American actress. She is best known for her role as Cinnamon Carter on the action television series Mission: Impossible (1966–1969), which earned her three Primetime Emmy Awards, as well as a Golden Globe Award nomination. She also starred as Dr. Helena Russell on the British-Italian coproduction science-fiction television series Space: 1999 (1975–1977). Bain has also appeared in the films Animals with the Tollkeeper (1998), Panic (2000), Forget Me Not (2009) and On the Rocks (2020).

== Early life ==
Bain was born Mildred Fogel in Chicago, Illinois, the daughter of Russian-Jewish immigrants. She graduated from the University of Illinois with a bachelor's degree in sociology. Developing an interest in dance, she moved to New York City, where she studied alongside Martha Graham. Dissatisfied with her career as a dancer, she went into modeling; jobs with Vogue, Harper's, and other publications followed.

Still uninspired, however, Bain entered the Theater Studio to study acting, first under Curt Conway, then Lonny Chapman. Progressing to the Actors Studio, she was instructed by Lee Strasberg.

Bain's first acting role was in Paddy Chayevsky's play Middle of the Night, which embarked on a national tour in October 1957. Accompanying Bain was fellow actor and new husband Martin Landau; the final leg of the tour brought the couple to Los Angeles, where they settled permanently. After moving, Bain established herself at the Actors Studio West, where she continued to teach classes and perform scene work.

== Career ==
Bain's earliest television appearances included CBS's Tightrope, with Mike Connors, and three ABC series: The Law and Mr. Jones, Adventures in Paradise, and Straightaway. After a recurring role as David Janssen's romantic interest in Richard Diamond, Private Detective in 1959, she guest-starred as Madelyn Terry in a 1960 episode of Perry Mason, "The Case of the Wary Wildcatter".

In 1963, Bain appeared as Rob Petrie's soon-to-be ex-fiancée in The Dick Van Dyke Show, in the episode "Will You Two Be My Wife?", and in 1964 played the role of Elayna Scott in "The Case of the Nautical Knot" episode of Perry Mason. In 1965, she guest-starred alongside series star Jerry Van Dyke in an episode of My Mother The Car. She appeared in the 1966 final episode of the series alongside Van Dyke.

Between 1966 and 1969, Bain appeared—alongside her husband, Martin Landau—in the major role of Cinnamon Carter in Mission: Impossible, winning three consecutive Emmy Awards for Best Dramatic Actress for her performances in 1967, 1968, and 1969, in addition to a Golden Globe Award nomination in 1968. Bain reprised her character in a 1997 episode of Diagnosis: Murder. She starred opposite Landau again in the science-fiction TV series Space: 1999 (1975–77) as Dr. Helena Russell and in the made-for-TV film The Harlem Globetrotters on Gilligan's Island (1981).

She guest-starred in the October 29, 1985, episode of Moonlighting, playing Emily Greydon. Bain also appeared in My So-Called Life, playing Angela Chase's grandmother in one episode. Other appearances include "Matryoshka", an episode of the 1990s science-fiction series Millennium.

In 1998, Bain appeared in the Walker, Texas Ranger episode "Saving Grace", as the mother superior. In 2006, she had a minor role in one episode of CSI: Crime Scene Investigation ("Living Legends"). In 2008, co-starring with her daughter Juliet Landau, Bain voiced the character of Verdona Tennyson in "What Are Little Girls Made Of?", an episode of Ben 10: Alien Force.

On April 28, 2016, Bain was honored with the 2,579th star on the Hollywood Walk of Fame, located at 6767 Hollywood Boulevard. Lifelong friends Edward Asner and Dick Van Dyke were on hand to speak and assist in the unveiling of the star.

== Personal life ==
Bain married actor Martin Landau in 1957; they divorced in 1993. They have two daughters, film producer Susan Landau Finch and actress Juliet Landau. Bain suffers from claustrophobia, which the writers of Mission: Impossible incorporated into her character on the show in the episode "The Exchange".

== Filmography ==
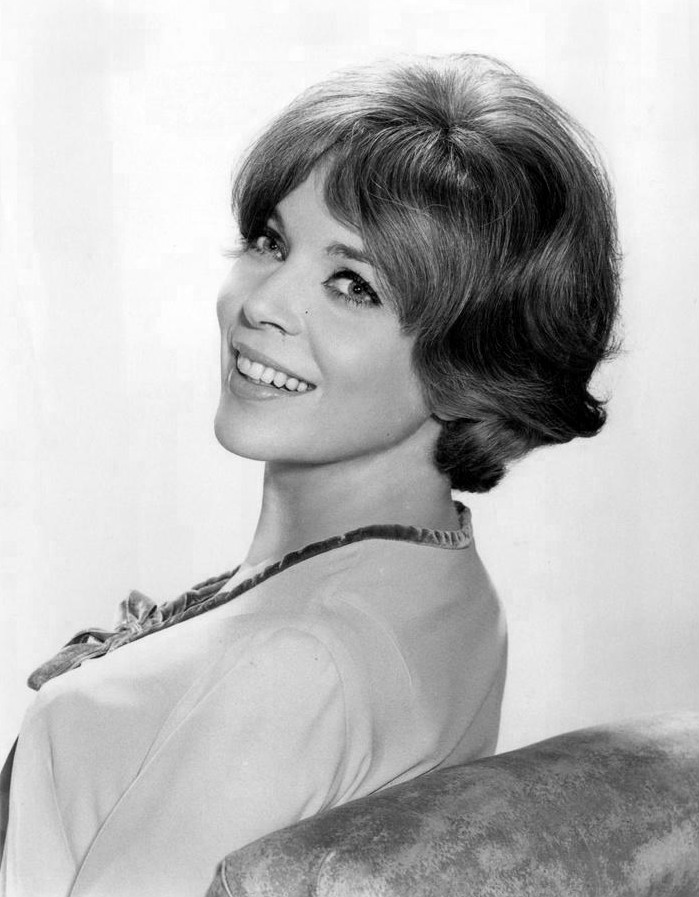
Bain in a publicity photo for Mission: Impossible, 1966

=== Film ===
Year	Title	Role	Notes		
1989	Trust Me	Mary Casal			
1989	Skinheads	Martha			
1990	The Spirit of '76	Hipster			
1997	Platform Six	Madame Harwin	Short film		
1998	Animals	The Mother			
1998	Gideon	Sarah			
1998	Dry Martini	Madame Richaud	Short film		
1998	Airtime		Short film		
2000	Panic	Deidre			
2000	Bel Air	Agnes			
2002	American Gun	Anne Tillman			
2009	In the Mix	Ms. Crump	Short film		
2009	Forget Me Not	Sister Dolores			
2009	Political Disasters	Elizabeth		Nothing Special	Catherine
2012	Match Made	Meredith	Short film		
2014	Lost Music	Roxanne	Short film		
2015	Pacific Edge	Coral	Short film		
2016	Grace	Grace / Grandma	Short film		
2016	Silver Skies	Eve			
2018	Reconnected	Gloria	Short film		
2018	The Matchmaker	Sarah	Short film		
2018	Take My Hand	Marie	Short film		
2020	On the Rocks	Gran Keane			
2025	The Eagle Obsession	Self	Documentary		

=== Television ===
Year	Title	Role	Notes
1958	Harbormaster	Mary Owens	Episode: "The Captain's Gun"
1959	Mike Hammer	Dora Church	Episode: "Accentuate the Negative"
1959	Philip Marlowe	Donna Raymond	Episode: "Ugly Duckling" (pilot)
1959	State Trooper	Madge Slausen	Episode: "Fiddle Dee Dead"
1959	Richard Diamond, Private Detective	Karen Wells	5 episodes
1959	Mr. Lucky	Prudence	Episode: "The Money Game"
1959	Alcoa Theatre	Judy Coyne	Episode: "Small Bouquet"
1959	Tightrope	Sandra	Episode: "Cold Kill"
1960	The Law and Mr. Jones	D.J.	Episode: "Christmas Is a Legal Holiday"
1960	Perry Mason	Madelyn Terry	Episode: "The Case of Wary Wildcatter"
1960–1961	Adventures in Paradise	Martha Peterson	2 episodes
1962	Straightaway	Melody	Episode: "The Craziest Race in Town"
1963	The Dick Van Dyke Show	Dorothy	Episode: "Will You Two Be My Wife?"
1963	Hawaiian Eye	Anne Munroe	Episode: "Two Million Too Much"
1963	Empire	June Bates	Episode: "Hidden Asset"
1963	The Many Loves of Dobie Gillis	Veronica	Episode: "I Was a Spy for the F.O.B."
1963	The Lieutenant	Cissie Van Osten	Episode: "A Touching of Hands"
1963	77 Sunset Strip	Rachel Dent	Episode: "By His Own Verdict"
1963	Wagon Train	Lucy Garrison	Episode: "The Fenton Canaby Story"
1964	The Greatest Show on Earth	Betty	Episode: "The Night the Monkey Died"
1964	Ben Casey	Tutor	Episode: "A Woods Full of Question Marks"
1964	Perry Mason	Elayna Scott	Episode: "The Case of the Nautical Knot"
1964	Valentine's Day	Unknown	Episode: "The Old School Tie"
1965	Get Smart	Alma	Episode: "KAOS in CONTROL"
1965–1966	My Mother the Car	Inge / Frankie	Episode: "I'm Through Being a Nice Guy" / "Desperate Minutes"
1966–1969	Mission: Impossible	Cinnamon Carter	Main cast (seasons 1–3); Primetime Emmy Award for Outstanding Lead Actress in a Drama Series (1967–1969); Nominated—Golden Globe Award for Best Actress – Television Series Drama
1969	The Red Skelton Show	Newspaperwoman	Episode: "Crime Doesn't Pay But It's Tax Free"
1971	Murder Once Removed	Lisa Manning	Television film
1973	Savage	Gail Abbot	Television film
1974	The Waltons	Angelique	Episode: "The First Day"
1975–1977	Space: 1999	Dr. Helena Russell	Main cast
1981	The Harlem Globetrotters on Gilligan's Island	Dr. Olga Schmetner	Television film
1984	Mickey Spillane's Mike Hammer	Julia Huntley	Episode: "A Death in the Family"
1985	Moonlighting	Emily Greydon	Episode: "My Fair David"
1987	Scarecrow and Mrs. King	Christina Golitsyn	Episode: "The Khrushchev List"
1987	CBS Summer Playhouse	Julie Barrington	Episode: "Barrington"
1988	Murder, She Wrote	Nora Morgan	Episode: "Coal Miner's Slaughter”
1991	Murder, She Wrote	Ellen Lombard	Episode: "Unauthorized Obituary"
1992	Likely Suspects	Buffy Hines-Baldi	Episode: "Pilot"
1994	My So-Called Life	Vivian Wood	Episode: "Other People's Mothers"
1997	The Visitor	Constance MacArthur	Episode: "Reunion"
1997	Diagnosis: Murder	Cinnamon Carter	Episode: "Discards"
1998	Walker, Texas Ranger	Mother Superior	Episode: "Saving Grace"
1999	Millennium	Lilly Unser	Episode: "Matryoshka"
2003	Strong Medicine	Mrs. March	Episode: "Orders"
2003	Tracey Ullman in the Trailer Tales	Judy Utemeyer	Television film
2006	CSI: Crime Scene Investigation	Mrs. Iris Paul	Episode: "Living Legend"
2008	Ben 10: Alien Force	Verdona	Voice, episode: "What Are Little Girls Made Of?"
2016	Code Black	Blanche	Episode: "Exodus"
2020	Space Command	Aunt Simone	Episode: "Ripple Effect"
