= The Limits of Control =

- Promotional film poster
- Directed by: Jim Jarmusch
- Written by: Jim Jarmusch
- Produced by: Stacey Smith; Gretchen McGowan
- Starring: Isaach de Bankolé; Paz de la Huerta; Tilda Swinton; Gael García Bernal; Bill Murray; Hiam Abbass; John Hurt
- Cinematography: Christopher Doyle
- Edited by: Jay Rabinowitz
- Music by: Boris
- Production companies: Entertainment Farm; PointBlank Films
- Distributed by: Focus Features
- Release date: May 1, 2009
- Running time: 116 minutes
- Country: United States
- Languages: English; Spanish; French; Japanese; Arabic
- Box office: $2 million

The Limits of Control is a 2009 American film written and directed by Jim Jarmusch, starring Isaach de Bankolé as a solitary assassin, carrying out a job in Spain. Filming began in February 2008, and took place on location in Madrid, Seville and Almería, Spain. The film was distributed by Focus Features. It received mixed reviews, with criticism for its slow pace and inaccessible dialogue while being praised for its beautiful cinematography and ambitious scope.

== Plot ==
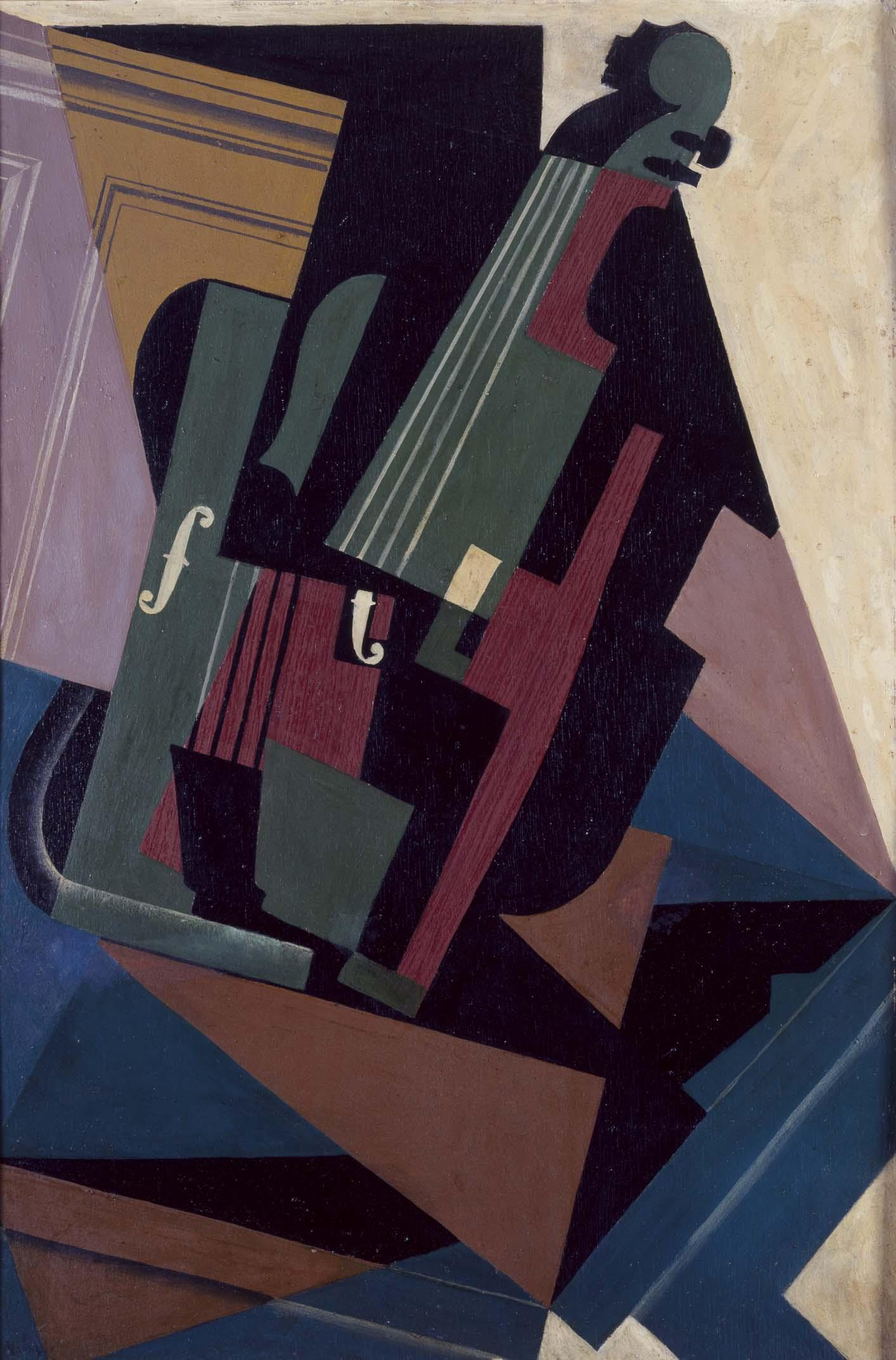
Lone Man admires Le violon by Juan Gris on his first visit to Museo Nacional Centro de Arte Reina Sofía right before meeting Violin.

In an airport, Lone Man is being instructed on his mission by Creole. The mission itself is left unstated and the instructions are cryptic, including such phrases as "Everything is subjective," "The universe has no center and no edges; reality is arbitrary," and "Use your imagination and your skills." After the meeting at the airport, he travels to Madrid and then on to Seville, meeting several people in cafés and on trains along the way.

Each meeting has the same pattern: he orders two espressos at a cafe and waits, his contact arrives and in Spanish asks, "You don't speak Spanish, right?" in different ways, to which he responds, "No." The contacts tell him about their individual interests such as molecules, art, or film, then the two of them exchange matchboxes. Inside each matchbox that Lone Man receives, is a code written on a small piece of paper. He reads them, and then eat the paper. These coded messages lead him to his next rendezvous.

He repeatedly encounters a woman who is always either completely nude or wearing only a transparent raincoat. She invites him to have sex with her but he declines, stating that he never has sex while he is working. One phrase that Creole, the man in the airport, tells him is repeated throughout the movie: "He who thinks he is bigger than the rest must go to the cemetery. There he will see what life really is: a handful of dirt." This phrase is sung in a peteneras flamenco song in a club in Seville at one point in his journey.

In Almería, he is given a ride in a pickup truck - driven by a companion of the Mexican - on which the words La vida no vale nada ('life is worth nothing') are painted, a phrase Guitar says to him in Seville, and he is taken to Tabernas desert. There lies a fortified and heavily guarded compound. After observing the compound from afar, he somehow penetrates its defenses and waits for his target inside the target's office. The target asks how he got in, and he answers, "I used my imagination." After garroting the target with a guitar string, he rides back to Madrid, to the room where he disrobes from his latest fresh suit. Folding it, and locking it away, he changes into a sweatsuit bearing the national flag of Cameroon. Before exiting the train station onto a crowded sidewalk he throws away his last matchbox.

== Cast ==
- Isaach de Bankolé as Lone Man
- Bill Murray as American
- Tilda Swinton as Blonde
- Gael García Bernal as Mexican
- Hiam Abbass as Driver
- Paz de la Huerta as Nude
- Alex Descas as Creole
- John Hurt as Guitar
- Youki Kudoh as Molecules
- Jean-François Stévenin as French
- Óscar Jaenada as The Waiter
- Luis Tosar as Violin

== Production ==
We deliberately tried to take away things that would be expected from the film. Which is the absolute opposite of the American way of approaching... "okay, what demographic, what do they want, what do they expect, give it to them." It was like, let's see, can we make an action film with no action in it? Can we make a narrative where the plot is just like a series of repeated variations on something? Can we have a film with characters that have no background, no past, no present, no name, we don't know what they represent, they're metaphorical? These are all the things that people expect, so we were trying to remove the things that they would expect, with the predictable results, in the United States, of not a whole lot of people being interested in the film. That's okay, you know, we thought it was successful experiment on our part.

— Jim Jarmusch, The Wire

Jarmusch had the first idea about "a very quiet, very centered criminal on some sort of mission" fifteen years prior to the release of the movie. Writing started with an idea for an actor, a character and a place and the rest was filled in afterwards. Isaach de Bankolé was to play a quiet centred criminal in the Torres Blancas apartment tower that Jarmusch himself first visited in the 80s. The filming was started with only what Jarmusch calls 'a minimal map', a 25-page story. The dialogues were filled in the night before each scene was shot. This was in fact the first of Jarmusch's films that took place entirely outside of the United States and there were some plans for the filming locations beginning in Madrid, then taking train south to Seville and finally southeast to desert near the coastal town of Almería.

Jarmusch cites novels about a professional criminal called Parker written by Richard Stark as an inspiration and also mentions that he loves John Boorman’s 1967 film Point Blank which was based on those novels. Jacques Rivette's films were also used as inspiration for the plot full of disorienting cryptic clues with no clear solution. The title The Limits of Control comes from an essay of the same name by William S. Burroughs, in which Jarmusch notes that he likes the double sense of: "Is it the limits to our own self-control? Or is it the limits to which they can control us, 'they' being whoever tries to inject some kind of reality over us?" Jarmusch also employed the Oblique Strategies created by musician Brian Eno to reassure himself in the creative process, specifically the using phrases "Are these sections considered transitions?", "Emphasize repetitions.", and "Look closely at the most interesting details and amplify them," all of which were explicitly naming processes that they were doing during the filmmaking.

Many small details in the film have personal significance for Jarmusch. He had received the 'Le Boxeur' matchboxes as a gift, first from musicologist Louis Sarno, then from Isaach de Bankolé. The black pickup truck with the words "La Vida No Vale Nada" written on its back was modeled after a truck owned by Joe Strummer of the Clash, who had lived for some time in the south of Spain and also appeared in Jarmusch's 1989 film Mystery Train.

The aim of the film, according to Jarmusch, was to create an "action film with no action" and a "film with suspense but no drama". He states that the film has a rather cubist nature, is "interpretable in different ways, and they’re all valid," and that it is not his job to know what the film means.

== Reception ==
On the review aggregator website Rotten Tomatoes, 43% of 128 critics' reviews are positive. The website's consensus reads: "A minimalist exercise in not much of anything, The Limits of Control is a tedious viewing experience with little reward." Metacritic, which uses a weighted average, assigned the film a score of 41 out of 100, based on 22 critics, indicating "mixed or average" reviews.

Philip French of The Guardian wrote "The Limits of Control is a picture people will love or loathe, though no one could fail to be impressed by the haunted, surreal atmosphere that is rendered by the brilliant Hong Kong-based Australian cinematographer Christopher Doyle." Manohla Dargis of The New York Times "At least for its first hour, before its repetition strategy turns tedious, the same could be said of The Limits of Control, a nondramatic work best appreciated as a pure image-and-sound event." Mike Goodridge of Screen International wrote "The Limits Of Control is a puzzle wrapped in an dream, a blur of reality and consciousness, images and sounds, which stubbornly – and proudly – refuses to follow conventions of narrative or pacing. As maddening as it is intriguing, the film is unlikely to break out of a very small arthouse niche."

Michael Koresky of IndieWire wrote "Like his poetic Western Dead Man (one of the very best films of the Nineties), Jarmusch keeps The Limits of Control smartly, if tensely, balanced between matters of existence and those of genre filmmaking. It’s less a willfully obscure puzzle movie than a careful description of the world refracted in art (Rimbaud, Burroughs, Gris, Kaurismaki, Hitchcock). And that likewise, as indicated in the film’s opening image, of De Bankole meditating in a bathroom, his tai chi moves distorted and upside down in a mirror, art is merely a funhouse reflection of reality." Rupert de of Den of Geek wrote "Jamurch, whose previous films include Ghost Dog: Way Of The Samurai (1999) and Broken Flowers (2005), has created a psychedelic indie symphony in the key of cool minor. Some will love his self-indulgent prog-filmmaking. Others think it’s a load of old tosh – kind of like Pink Floyd albums." Nathan Lee of NPR wrote "The Limits of Control may well test the limits of your patience for deadpan hipster minimalism. In other words, the new movie by Jim Jarmusch is the ultimate Jim Jarmusch movie: hyper-self-conscious, bone-dry droll, achingly chic, shamelessly intellectual."

Critic Roger Ebert rated half out of four stars, praising the cinematography but was critical of the meandering screenplay. He noted that Doyle's cinematography and his discussions with Jarmusch reminded of the silent film Man with a Movie Camera (1929), where "it shows a man with a movie camera, photographing things. Was Jarmusch remaking it without the man and the camera?" Dana Stevens of Slate, panned the film adding that "this beautifully shot and painstakingly constructed film is a self-indulgent bucket of hogwash." Peter Bradshaw of The Guardian added "Naturally, we didn't expect anything so banal as a literal "explanation" of what is supposed to have happened, but from the director of Broken Flowers and Down By Law (1986) we could have expected some wit or entertainment."

Todd McCarthy of Variety wrote "it just feels tired and recycled — the referencing of Rimbaud and Blake, the flagrant hipsterism that here falsifies rather than refreshes, the self-conscious plunking down of all manner of foreign actors in unlikely contexts, the above-it-all attitude toward connecting on a human level." Critic based at The Hollywood Reporter wrote "while the always effective De Bankole remains a captivating presence and masterful Christopher Doyle’s cinematography is undeniably arresting, Jarmusch’s meandering musings on language as a control mechanism, as filtered through the impressionistic lens of an Antonioni or Jacques Rivette, fail to make any kind of lasting impression."

In a retrospective review, Vincent Cotroneo of Movieweb called it as one of the coolest philosophical films, adding "There are no answers to many of the questions asked throughout the entire runtime. Characters come and go and artifacts seem to just serve as red herrings with, to some, seemingly no meaning. But as dreams come and go, so do the elements of The Limits of Control. The film could be a motion picture realization of a dream and its unpredictability. It's intriguing, strange, and unnatural, but we are forced to take witness to its unusual nature, and surrender control to its artistry."

== Soundtrack ==
The soundtrack is created out of existing music selected by the director Jim Jarmusch. It includes drone-doom bands Boris and Sunn O))), adagio classical music and peteneras flamenco. For scenes where no suitable music could be found, Jarmusch's own band Bad Rabbit recorded new songs. The common characteristics of the used music are its overall slowness and rich musical landscape. The Black Angels’ "You on the Run" was even slowed down while maintaining the pitch to better fit the rest of the soundtrack. Music served as the inspiration for the atmosphere and editing of the film, the guitar that appears in the story should represent a guitar that was used in the 1920s by Manuel El Sevillano to record "Por Compasión: Malagueñas", lyrics from "El Que Se Tenga Por Grande" are referenced throughout the film.
