= Forever Young, Forever Free =

- Directed by: Ashley Lazarus
- Written by: Ashley Lazarus
- Story by: Andre Pieterse
- Produced by: Ashley Lazarus; Andre Pieterse
- Starring: José Ferrer; Karen Valentine; Norman Knox; Muntu Ndebele
- Cinematography: Arthur J. Ornitz
- Edited by: Lionel Selwyn
- Music by: Lee Holdridge
- Production companies: Film Trust; Milton Okun; Ely Landau Organization (uncredited)
- Distributed by: Universal Pictures (U.S./Canada); Warner Bros. (overseas)
- Release date: 24 March 1975
- Running time: 85 minutes
- Country: South Africa
- Languages: English; Afrikaans

Forever Young, Forever Free (original South African title: e'Lollipop) is a 1975 South African drama film directed by Ashley Lazarus and starring José Ferrer and Karen Valentine. The highest-grossing South African release in its original run, it was picked up by Universal Pictures for U.S. release in re-edited and retitled form.

== Plot ==
A white orphan, Jannie, is dropped off at an orphanage run by a priest and nun in Lesotho, Southern Africa. The boy befriends another orphan, Tsepo, who is black. While playing with a tractor tyre, Jannie rolls down a cliff, severely injuring himself. During this ordeal, he has flashbacks to his parents dying. Jannie is evacuated to New York City via a USAF mercy flight, to have his kidneys operated on, due to his injuries. He has permanent renal damage, requiring him to take pills for the rest of his life. The local village raises money so Father Alberto and Tsepo can go to New York. At the airport, Tsepo is mistaken for a school student and lugged onto a school bus, before escaping the school bus in Harlem. Upon meeting a Zulu-speaker, Tsepo is taken to the police and reunited with Father Alberto. He then joins Jannie and explores New York before the two friends return to Lesotho.

== Cast ==
- José Ferrer as Father Alberto
- Karen Valentine as Carol Anne
- Muntu Ndebele as Tsepo
- Norman Knox as Jannie
- Bess Finney as Sister Marguerita
- Simon Sabela as Rakwaba the Witchdoctor
- Ken Gampu as Thomas Luke

== Production ==
e'Lollipop was the first feature film for director Ashley Lazarus (who had helmed documentaries previously) and television actress Karen Valentine. It was one of eight planned inaugural features in the Children's Film Theater, a U.S./Canadian matinee initiative slated to launch in late 1975 as a counterpart to Laundau's own American Film Theatre program. The film was named after a scene in which Tsepo and Jannie share a lollipop together, thus beginning a friendship which would mirror that of their actors Muntu Ndebele and Norman Knox.

Knox was ten years old when he was cast by talent scouts visiting his school. Filming took place in South Africa and New York City, starting on 8 July 1974. When screened for South African authorities, it was passed uncut in line with screenwriter Andre Pieterse's intent.

== Soundtrack ==
Forever Young, Forever Free

Soundtrack album by Lee Holdridge
- Released: November 1976
- Label: MCA

The soundtrack for e'Lollipop was composed by Lee Holdridge. The Pittsburgh Post-Gazette's George Anderson wrote of its U.S. release as Forever Young, Forever Free, "A mixture of innocent-sounding pop melodies and African folk music...[this] pleasant album [is] 'dedicated to children everywhere.'"

== Themes ==
The film was "one of the few [apartheid-era productions] which imagined some type of friendship between blacks and whites...[but] did not [set out to] challenge apartheid ideology". In a 2019 story for Variety magazine, director Ashley Lazarus said: " E'Lollipop took on the need of South Africa to overcome the negativity of apartheid and the ramifications. We rose above apartheid and made a film about friendship between the love of two children. And that transcended apartheid."

== Release ==
In its native South Africa, the original e'Lollipop was South Africa's highest-grossing film during its original release, despite facing an embargo in Bloemfontein theatres for fear of bans. International rights went through Warner Bros., while Universal Pictures acquired the film for U.S. and Canadian distribution as early as 31 August 1975.

Universal proceeded to re-edit and retitle it as Forever Young, Forever Free. The revised version, according to Keyan Tomaselli of Cinéaste, "turned the well-paced pathos of a little black boy who sacrifices his life for his white friend into a soppy happy ending which negates the film's moral and racial parable." Furthermore, its distribution in that market was mainly relegated to "the lower half of double bills".

In 2004, the film opened a Cannes retrospective on South African cinema. A subsequent video and DVD release in its native country was announced by Pieterse's MA Afrika company; proceeds were slated to benefit children's charities.

== Reception ==
In June 1979, David Deneui of The Bellingham Herald gave the film 2½ stars, writing that "the simple story...could be entertaining family viewing." In later years, film critic Leonard Maltin gave it the same rating in his Movie Guide, finding it "Entertaining, if a bit too sugar-coated".

== Legacy ==
Forever Young, Forever Free was labelled as a cult classic in a 2004 IOL article. The lives of actors Muntu Ndebele and Norman Knox are dramatised in the unofficial 2011 Canadian sequel, A Million Colours, directed by Peter Bishai and co-written with Andre Pieterse.
