= Ravager (film) =

- Directed by: James D. Deck
- Written by: James D. Deck
- Produced by: Stanley Isaacs; Scott McGinnis; Robert Patrick
- Starring: Bruce Payne; Yancy Butler; Juliet Landau; Robin Sachs
- Cinematography: Adam Kane
- Edited by: Nicholas Edgar
- Music by: John Nordstorm
- Distributed by: Paramount Home Entertainment
- Release dates: September 6, 1997 (USA); September 16, 1997 (Russia)
- Running time: 92 minutes
- Country: United States
- Language: English

Ravager is a 1997 horror/science fiction film written and directed by James D. Deck and starring Bruce Payne, Yancy Butler, Juliet Landau and Robin Sachs.

== Plot ==
There was no way for Avedon Hammond (Yancy Butler) to foresee the impending crisis. As command pilot of the I/P/T transport ship Armstrong, a space-weary NASA discard now used routinely in sub-orbital transport runs, the attractive, highly proficient pilot has her hands full. Upon entering the ship to prepare for liftoff, she's chagrined to find that her flight has been reassigned to another command pilot, Cooper Wayne (Bruce Payne), a daredevil she knows all too well—as an ex-lover from whom she just had to walk away. Avedon is further annoyed to find that the flight is another "mystery run," no paperwork, no flight plan, and a handful of passengers on what should be a cargo carrier.

The eclectic riffraff of passengers includes Lazarus (Salvator Xuereb), a two-bit hustler; Dr. Shephard (Robin Sachs), a skilled former micro-surgeon now addicted to his own self-prescribed medications; Cade (David Stratton), an edgy young man obsessed with finding the wife who deserted him; and Sarra (Juliet Landau), a flawlessly beautiful young woman with a mysterious past. About the only "stand-up guy" aboard is chief engineer Mick 'Clean' McClean (Stanley Kamel), a technical genius who's called upon regularly to repair just about every system on board the tired ship.

After takeoff, two booster rockets become obstructed and the Avedon is forced to crash land in a desolate, uncharted region of the South Asian desert wracked by seismic tremors. While trying to recover tridymite to fabricate new flight data circuit boards, the crew stumbles upon an underground military depository for advanced biological weapons. One of the passengers gets infected by the weapons and turns into a zombie with murderous proclivities. Avedon and Cooper attempt to protect the other passengers and get the plane repaired and to safety as soon as is possible.

== Cast ==
- Bruce Payne as Cooper Wayne
- Yancy Butler as Avedon Hammond
- Juliet Landau as Sarra
- Stanley Kamel as Clean
- Robin Sachs as Dr. Shepard
- Salvator Xuereb as Lazarus
- Stuart Cornfeld as Doctor
- Momo Yashima as Nurse
- Diane Pershing as Des (voice)

== Reception ==
The Radio Times described the film as 'Outbreak meets Alien and stated that it was 'a competently made and acted science-fiction thriller'. John Stanley stated that the interactions between Butler's character and Payne's and Landau's characters "provide more substance than usual". Tim Gross described the film as a 'fun mid 90s low budget sci-fi flick'. In contrast, Fraser Sherman described the film as 'boring'.
