= Barbara Gomes-Beach =

Boston AIDS activist

Barbara Gomes Beach
- Died: 2017
- Family: Michael Beach

Barbara Gomes-Beach (died 2017) was a community organizer and HIV/AIDS activist in Boston. She was the executive director of the Multicultural AIDS Coalition, a nonprofit AIDS prevention and outreach organization in Boston, until her death in 2017.

Gomes-Beach was born in Oakdale, Wareham, MA. She attended Wareham High School. She completed her undergraduate degree in political science from University of Massachusetts Boston and received a graduate degree in city planning from MIT. Her MA thesis on STEM pre-college programs for youth of color was supervised by Mel King. She was of Cape Verdean, Portuguese and African heritage. She was the mother of American actor, Michael Beach.

== Career and advocacy ==
Before working at the Multicultural AIDS Coalition (MAC), Gomes-Beach worked at the Dorchester Bay Economic Development Corporation. She and the MAC work to serve communities of color and end the HIV epidemic.

Gomes-Beach was an advocate for black and Hispanic communities who were affected by the HIV epidemic. During her tenure at MAC, Gomes-Beach advocated for a NIAID trial on Kemron, a low-dose oral drug that was purported to aid HIV patients. Gomes-Beach also led a Multicultural AIDS project that focused on public education on HIV/AIDS. In Massachusetts, she opposed the use of name-tracking in black and Hispanic communities that were infected with HIV. Gomes-Beach was the co-chairperson of the Congressional Black Caucus' AIDS coalition, the AIDS Ad Hoc Committee. She was invited to a Harvard conference, "The Untold Story: AIDS and Black Americans," to discuss the effects of HIV on Black communities and criticized the organizers for not reaching out to local communities.

Gomes-Beach was a commissioner on the Commission on Status of Women in Massachusetts. She was also the consultant for the National Association for Minority Contractors 1988 Convention. Gomes-Beach was a member of the Cape Verdean Day Committee established to inaugurate Governor Michael Dukakis' recognition of Cape Verdean Recognition Week.

In 2023, she was recognized as one of "Boston's most admired, beloved, and successful Black Women leaders" by the Black Women Lead project.
