= Otomo (film) =

1999 film

- Directed by: Frieder Schlaich
- Written by: Klaus Pohl; Frieder Schlaich
- Produced by: Irene von Alberti
- Starring: Isaach De Bankolé; Barnaby Metschurat; Hanno Friedrich; Eva Mattes; Lara Kugler; Sigrid Burkholder
- Cinematography: Volker Tittel
- Edited by: Magdolna Rokob
- Music by: Don Philippe
- Production company: Filmgalerie 451
- Release date: 1999
- Running time: 82 minutes
- Country: Germany
- Language: German

Otomo is a 1999 German drama film directed by Frieder Schlaich, distributed by ArtMattan productions. The plot is a fictionalised account of the events that led up to the 1989 double murder of police officers Harald Poppe and Peter Quast in Stuttgart, and follows the perpetrator, Frederic Otomo (portrayed by Isaach de Bankolé), in a reconstruction of the hours leading up to the killings.

Otomo was the winner of numerous awards, including the Diversity in Spirit Award, Vancouver 2000, Best Film, Belgamo 2000, Best Actress, Valinciennes 2000 and a Kino Award.

== Plot ==
The journey begins with Frederic Otomo departing from his home, early one morning, to get a job at a factory in Stuttgart. There, he is refused employment from a cast of German workers, predicated upon the claim that his shoes are not proper for the work. Later, he departs for home on a train, disappointed, to be kicked off of the train by a ticket inspector who claims that his ticket has expired. Suddenly, Otomo becomes a fugitive when the ticket inspector refuses to let him off of the train, and instead tries to have him arrested. Fleeing, he later encounters a grandmother who attempts to help him escape Stuttgart, to Amsterdam. He kisses her then leaves, and is finally caught by police officers, while he is waiting for her on a bridge. Left no choice but to defend himself, Otomo, in desperation, stabs the five officers, and one of them shoots him dead.

== Critical reviews ==
The film received generally positive reviews from Western critics. The review aggregator Rotten Tomatoes reported that 100% of critics gave the film positive reviews based on 10 reviews. Metacritic reported that the film had an average score of 60 out of 100, based on 8 critic reviews.

The New York Times wrote a favorable review of the film. The New York Post described the film as a critique of Germany's government bureaucracy which "sentences refugees to misery by not allowing them to work".

== Background ==
The movie is a fictionalized account of an event that occurred on 8 August 1989 in Stuttgart. Frederic Otomo, a Cameroonian who also used the name of Albert Ament from Liberia, was wanted for assaulting a tram employee when police located him within a few hours of the incident. He then attacked the arresting officers with a bayonet hidden in a rolled-up newspaper, killing officers Harald Poppe and Peter Quast and wounding three others. A wounded officer fatally shot Otomo shortly after. See de:Polizistenmord auf der Gaisburger Brücke

Director Frieder Schaich, a native of Stuttgart, was inspired to make the film after the killings spread hysteria against any foreign workers through press reports. Schaich believed that Otomo, having fled from a war-torn region, was likely affected by a traumatic past and sought to find out more about Otomo's background. However, Schaich found no background information about Otomo in news reports while inquiries to Stuttgart administrators and social workers were denied. Discovering that Otomo was denied a job opportunity the day of the stabbing, Schaich was motivated to write the screenplay for the film with playwright Klaus Pohl as an exploration of how dismissive attitudes and mistreatment by German public officials and citizens might have led an already mentally unbalanced Otomo to commit the killings.
