= Where the Road Runs Out =

- Directed by: Rudolf Buitendach
- Written by: David Hughes (Inspired by an idea from Robert Mann and Krystal Stok)
- Produced by: Rudolf Buitendach; Karin S. de Boer
- Starring: Isaach de Bankolé; Juliet Landau; Stelio Savante
- Cinematography: Kees Van Oostrum
- Edited by: Rudolf Buitendach; Phil Carnes
- Music by: Laurent Eyquem
- Production company: Cotton Tree Productions
- Distributed by: Netflix
- Release date: 26 September 2014 (San Diego)
- Running time: 91 minutes
- Countries: South Africa; Netherlands; Equatorial Guinea
- Languages: English; Spanish

Where the Road Runs Out is a 2014 South African-Dutch-Equatorial Guinean drama film directed by Rudolf Buitendach and starring Isaach de Bankolé. It is the first feature film to be shot in Equatorial Guinea.

== Cast ==
- Isaach de Bankolé as George
- Juliet Landau as Corina
- Stelio Savante as Martin
- Sizo Motsoko as Jimmy

== Production ==
The film was shot in Equatorial Guinea, as well as in Durban and Rotterdam.

== Release ==
The film made its worldwide premiere at the San Diego International Film Festival on 26 September 2014.

On 8 June 2016, it was announced that Netflix acquired the distribution rights of the film.
