= An Evergreen Christmas =

- Poster
- Directed by: Jeremy Culver
- Screenplay by: Jeremy Culver and Morgen Culver
- Story by: Jeremy Culver and Morgen Culver
- Produced by: Kim Waltrip
- Starring: Charleene Closshey; Robert Loggia; Naomi Judd; Booboo Stewart; Tyler Ritter; Jake Sandvig; Greer Grammer
- Cinematography: Jeff Osborne
- Edited by: Sandy S. Solowitz
- Music by: Charleene Closshey
- Production companies: Two Roads Picture Co. (previously Evergreen Productions), Kim&Jim Productions
- Distributed by: Arc Entertainment, Spotlight Pictures
- Release date: November 4, 2014 (United States)
- Running time: 98 minutes
- Country: United States
- Language: English

An Evergreen Christmas is a 2014 American holiday independent film written by Jeremy Culver and Morgen Culver and directed by Jeremy Culver as Culver's first narrative feature. The film stars Charleene Closshey, Robert Loggia, Naomi Judd, Tyler Ritter, Booboo Stewart, Greer Grammer and Jake Sandvig and is set in the fictional town of Balsam Falls, Tennessee. Principal photography began in Charlotte, North Carolina in February 2013. The film released direct to DVD on November 4, 2014, with premiere theater screenings in Nashville, TN and Tampa, FL. The film was available on Netflix for 38 months from December 20, 2014, until January 21, 2018. The film is rated PG.

== Cast ==
Main

- Charleene Closshey as Evergreen “Evie” Lee
- Robert Loggia as “Pops”
- Naomi Judd as Miss Honey
- Tyler Ritter as Adam Milloy
- Booboo Stewart as Angel Velenquez
- Greer Grammer as Annabelle Jones
- Jake Sandvig as Chez Walsh

Supporting

- Brantley Pollock as Thomas
- Tiz McWilliams as Becky Tamora
- Jesse Moore as Joe
- Sal Lopez as Jose Velenquez
- Dyana Ortelli as Rosie Velenquez
- Alex Van as Jacob Jones
- Skyler Stonestreet as Babette

Additional

- Don Hartman as the Inspector
- Russell Cook as Owen Lee
- Jonathan Bedford as the Shepherd DJ
- Charles Closshey as Pat

== Reception ==
The film received mixed reviews.

Reviewer Donna Rolfe of The Dove Foundation called the holiday movie "charming", further adding the film "is a heartwarming story about living your dreams and not just chasing them. Many children have moved away from their homes to places they thought may be better, only to find out there is no place better than where they grew up to find their dreams."

In her review for Common Sense Media, Renee Schonfeld rated An Evergreen Christmas two stars from five, concluding: ... "Ms. Closshey, recognized as a talented musician, wrote the music, participated in the filmmaking, and clearly wants to add acting to her résumé; it’s an adequate effort. Overall it's an OK but uninspired film for older kids and teens that's unlikely to inspire multiple viewings."

== See also ==
- List of Christmas films
