= What Remains (2022 American film) =

2022 American feature film

- Directed by: Nathan Scoggins
- Written by: Nathan Scoggins
- Produced by: Ralph Winter
- Starring: Cress Williams; Kellan Lutz; Anne Heche
- Cinematography: Ralph Linhardt
- Edited by: Lonnie Urven
- Music by: Mateo Messina
- Production company: Sharpened Iron Studios
- Distributed by: Gravitas Ventures
- Release dates: October 2022 (Austin Film Festival); December 2, 2022
- Running time: 100 minutes
- Country: United States
- Language: English

What Remains is a 2022 American independent drama film starring Cress Williams, Kellan Lutz, and Anne Heche. The movie revolves around a small-town murder connected to a local pastor and an ex-con.

What Remains is one of the final feature films for Heche, who wrapped her scenes in late October 2021 before her death in August 2022.

== Synopsis ==
A small-town pastor is forced to reckon with an act of forgiveness when the convict he forgave for murdering his wife returns to town five years later, while the town sheriff investigates another murder that may be related.

== Cast ==
- Cress Williams as Marshall Shepard
- Kellan Lutz as Troy Parker Jr.
- Anne Heche as Maureen Silverton
- Marcus Gladney Jr. as Samuel Shepard
- Stelio Savante as Scott
- Juliana Destefano as Kaitlyn
- Maria Gajdosik as Dylan
- Korey Scott Pollard as Willis
- Lindsay Walker as Elizabeth

== Production ==
Filming took place in Amarillo, Texas, over five weeks. Twenty-one students from John Paul the Great Catholic University served in various roles on set, representing over a quarter of the film's crew.

== Release ==
The movie premiered at the 2022 Austin Film Festival, alongside notable films like Darren Aronofsky’s The Whale and Sam & Kate. The film had a simultaneous VOD release and limited theatrical run and was released on December 2nd, 2022.

== Reception ==
Rod Machen, a film critic for the Austin Chronicle, wrote: "What Remains is an example of what can happen when filmmakers tackle tough issues head on. Using non-linear storytelling, What Remains eschews the easy answers of simple movies and takes the audience on a painful ride with a man who tries to do the right thing but can never be sure that he’s pulling it off. Real life is always more complicated than we wish it was.”
