= Susan Landau Finch =

American film producer, writer, and director

Susan Meredith Finch (née Landau; born August 13, 1960) is an American film producer, writer, casting director, and director.

== Early life ==
Landau is the daughter of actors Barbara Bain and Martin Landau. Both her parents were Jewish. Her younger sister is actress and director Juliet Landau. The sisters spent their early childhood in West Los Angeles.

== Career ==
As a casting director, Landau was instrumental in David Cassidy, best known as a television actor, starring in the film The Spirit of '76.

Title	Role	Year
The Spirit of '76	producer, casting director	1990
Bram Stoker's Dracula	associate producer	1992
Traveling Light	producer	1994
Animals with the Tollkeeper	casting director	1998
Family Tree	casting director	2003
Without Rhythm or Reason	casting director	2003
Wake	producer, casting director	2003
The Breaks	casting director	2004
The Passage of Mrs. Calabash	casting director	2004
Circus Sam	casting director	2019
Stick and Poke	producer	2019
Fairyland	executive producer	2023

== Personal life ==
Landau has been married to Roy Finch since November 28, 1999. They have one daughter born in 2009.

== Source ==
- Jacqueline Plaza. "A Conversation with the Filmmakers of the Award Winning Film, 'Wake'", inmag.com. Accessed September 1, 2022.
