= Juliet Landau =

American actress (born 1965)

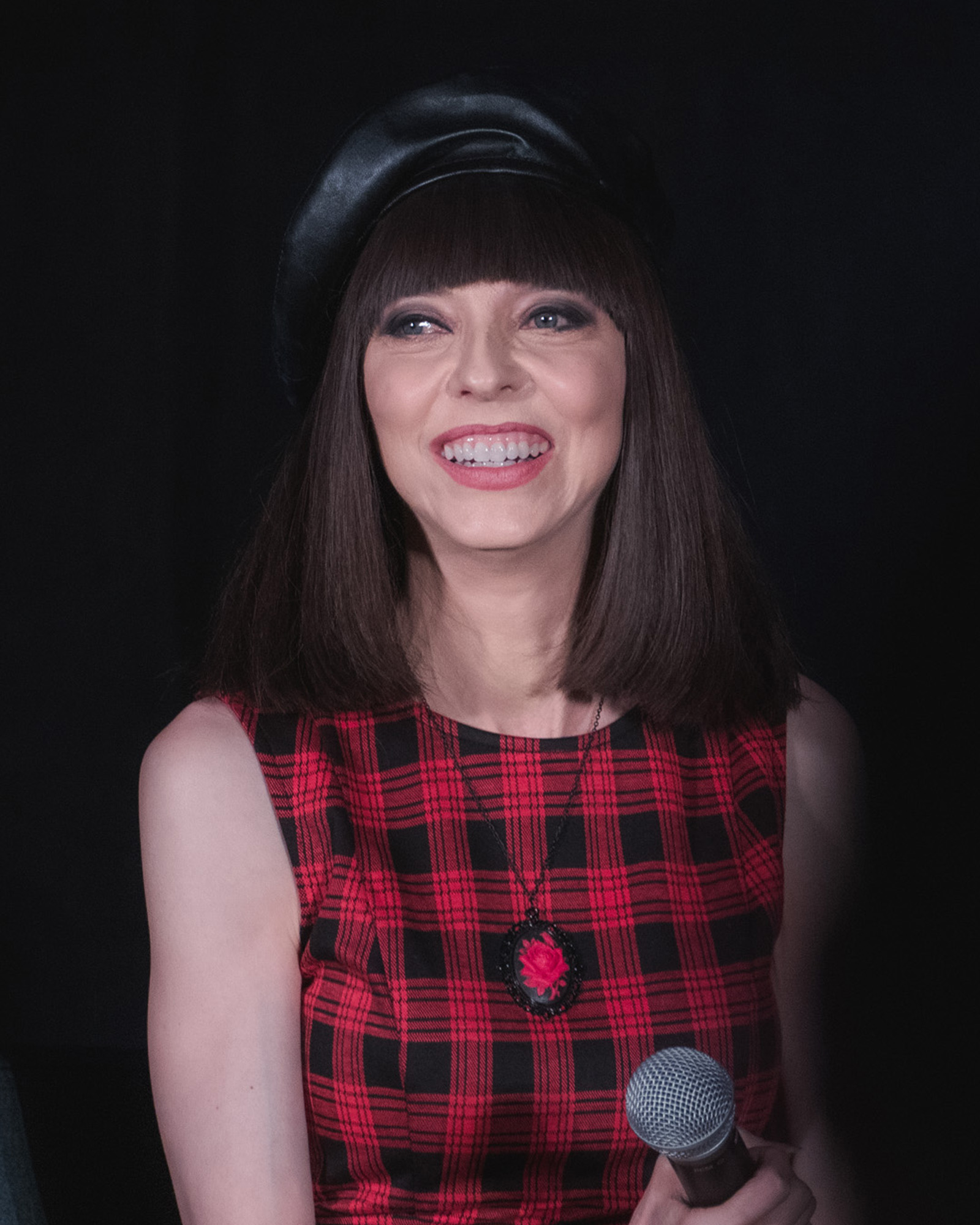
- Landau in 2025
- Born: Juliet Rose Landau; March 30, 1965 (age 61); Los Angeles, California, U.S.
- Occupations: Actress; director; producer; ballerina
- Years active: 1990–present
- Spouse: Deverill Weekes
- Parent(s): Martin Landau; Barbara Bain
- Relatives: Susan Landau Finch (sister)
- Website: julietlandau.com

Juliet Rose Landau (born March 30, 1965) is an American actress, director, producer, and ballerina best known for her role as Drusilla on Buffy the Vampire Slayer and its spinoff show Angel, the latter appearance earning her a Saturn Award nomination. She is also known for co-starring as Loretta King in Tim Burton's Ed Wood.

== Early life ==
Landau was born in Los Angeles to parents Martin Landau and Barbara Bain, both of whom were actors. Her older sister is film producer Susan Landau Finch. She spent her early childhood in West Los Angeles. Landau is a former professional ballerina.

== Career ==
Landau starred in some independent films including Where the Road Runs Out, Fairfield, Monster Mutt, Citizens, Dark Hearts, The Yellow Wallpaper, Hack!, Toolbox Murders, Repossessed, Carlo's Wake, Life Among the Cannibals, Ravager, Direct Hit, and co-starred in Henry Jaglom's Going Shopping. She also starred in the Lifetime film Fatal Reunion.

Landau guest starred in television shows Criminal Minds, Millennium, La Femme Nikita and Strong Medicine. She voiced various characters in the animated series Justice League Unlimited and Ben 10 as well as the animated film Green Lantern: First Flight. She has also voiced characters of the BioShock video games.

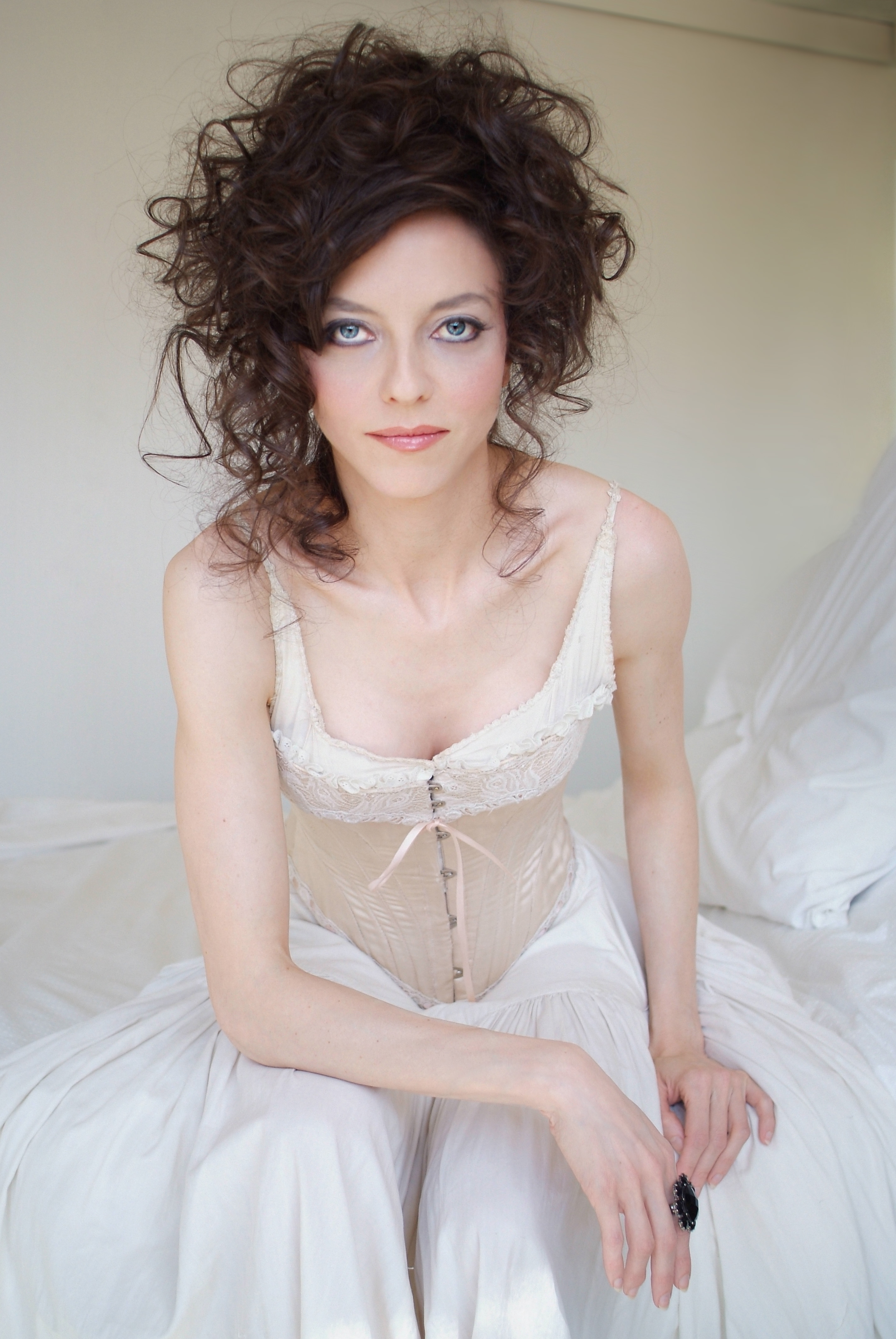
Landau in 2007

Landau's theater roles include Awake and Sing at the Pittsburgh Public Theater, the world premiere of Failure of Nerve, Danny and the Deep Blue Sea, A Streetcar Named Desire, Uncommon Women and Others, The Pushcart Peddlers, Billy Irish, We're Talking Today Here, the musical How To Steal An Election, Irish Coffee and the world premiere of musical The Songs of War. She played Natasha in a reading of Three Sisters, assembled by Al Pacino at The Actors Studio.

Landau made her directorial debut in 2008 with Take Flight, a short documentary film about Gary Oldman and his creative process. Oldman spoke positively about the experience. With her husband, Deverill Weekes, Landau co-directed Dream Out Loud, about make-up artist Kazuhiro Tsuji, who was branching into the world of fine art. The film captures one of his creations from inception to culmination, and features interviews with Guillermo del Toro, Joseph Gordon-Levitt, and Rian Johnson.

In 2009, Landau co-wrote issues #24 and #25 of the Angel comic book series for IDW Publishing, in collaboration with Brian Lynch, with storylines featuring her Buffy and Angel character Drusilla. Landau also contributed numerous ideas and references for the cover and interior art of the issues, and has stated that she would like to write more comics set in the Buffyverse. She was slated to write a five-part Drusilla miniseries from Dark Horse Comics in 2014, which is now delayed.

In 2012–13, Landau produced and starred in the play Danny and the Deep Blue Sea directed by John McNaughton at the Crown City Theater in North Hollywood. Her portrayal received positive reviews and awards, and the show was extended multiple times due to its popularity.

In July 2013, Landau was cast as a new incarnation of the Time Lord Romana in the audio dramas Gallifrey and Luna Romana, both of which are spin-offs from the BBC television series Doctor Who.

In 2019, Landau was cast as Rita Tedesco in the fifth season of Bosch on Amazon Prime Video.

In September 2019, Landau was cast as the vampire Hester for the web series Vampire: The Masquerade - LA by Night. Her character was part of a cabal of Tremere, vampires who can do blood sorcery, called the Wyrd Sisters.

== Personal life ==
Landau is a member of the Actors Studio and in 2008 was being mentored by Mike Medavoy.

== Filmography ==
=== Television ===
| Year | Title | Role | Notes |
|---|---|---|---|
| 1992 | Parker Lewis Can't Lose | Lucinda | Episode: "Dance of Romance" |
| 1999 | Millennium | Jeanie Bronstein | Episode: "Forcing the End" |
| 1999 | La Femme Nikita | Sarah Gerrard | Episode: "Before I Sleep" |
| 1999 | La Femme Nikita | Jan Baylin | Episode: "Before I Sleep" |
| 1997–2003 | Buffy the Vampire Slayer | Drusilla | 17 episodes |
| 2000–2004 | Angel | Drusilla | 7 episodes |
| 2003 | Strong Medicine | Lorraine | Episode: "Seize the Day" |
| 2005 | Fatal Reunion | Lisa Calders / Dana Declan | Television film |
| 2005–2006 | Justice League Unlimited | Tala, Plastique, Rama Kushna, Zatanna | Voice, 7 episodes |
| 2008–2010 | Ben 10: Alien Force | Helen Wheels, Verdona, Natalie Tennyson | Voice, 7 episodes |
| 2011 | Goodnight Burbank | Herself | Episode: "Lesbians on Acid" |
| 2011–2012 | Ben 10: Ultimate Alien | Verdona, Natalie Tennyson, Waitress | Voice, 4 episodes |
| 2012 | Criminal Minds | Catherine Heathridge | Episode: "Heathridge Manor" |
| 2012 | Green Lantern: The Animated Series | Drusa | Voice, 3 episodes |
| 2012 | ThunderCats | Queen Leona | Episode: "Native Son" |
| 2014 | Ben 10: Omniverse | Helen Wheels, Magistrata | Voice, episode: "Weapon XI" |
| 2015 | Muzzled: the Musical | Black Matron | |
| 2017 | Bosch | Rita Tedesco | |
| 2020 | Claws | Cordelia | |

=== Film ===
| Year | Title | Role |
|---|---|---|
| 1990 | Pump Up the Volume | Joni (scenes deleted) |
| 1992 | Neon City | Twink Talaman |
| 1994 | Ed Wood | Loretta King |
| 1994 | Direct Hit | Shelly |
| 1995 | Theodore Rex | Dr. Veronica Shade |
| 1996 | Life Among the Cannibals | Rachael |
| 1997 | Ravager | Sarra |
| 1999 | Carlo's Wake | Anna Torello |
| 2001 | Freedom Park | |
| 2002 | Citizens | Zoey |
| 2002 | Repossessed | Alison LaBatte |
| 2004 | Toolbox Murders | Julia Cunningham |
| 2005 | Going Shopping | Isabella |
| 2007 | Hack! | Mary |
| 2008 | Haunted Echoes (aka: Darkness Visible) | Claire |
| 2008 | Take Flight: Gary Oldman Directs Chutzpah | The Director |
| 2009 | Green Lantern: First Flight | Labella |
| 2009 | Monster Mutt | Nataliya |
| 2009 | Albion Rising | Ella Wheeler Wilcox |
| 2011 | InSight | Dr. Lisa Rosan |
| 2011 | The Yellow Wallpaper | Charlotte Weiland |
| 2012 | Justice League: Doom | Ten (voice) |
| 2012 | Strange Frame | Bitsea (voice) |
| 2014 | Dark Hearts | Astrid |
| 2014 | Fairfield | Ms. Matthews |
| 2014 | Where the Road Runs Out | Corina |
| 2015 | Justice League: Throne of Atlantis | Lois Lane (voice) |
| 2016 | The Bronx Bull | The Starlet |
| 2017 | The Terror of Hallow's Eve | Nurse Pryce |
| 2020 | A Place Among the Dead | Jules |

=== Video games ===
| Year | Title | Role |
|---|---|---|
| 2007 | BioShock | Little Sisters |
| 2009 | Ben 10 Alien Force: Vilgax Attacks | Verdona |
| 2012 | PlayStation All-Stars Battle Royale | Little Sister |
| 2013-2014 | BioShock Infinite: Burial at Sea | Little Sister, Masha Lutz, Leta |
| 2024 | Dragon Age: The Veilguard | Johanna Hezenkoss |

=== Web ===
| Year | Title | Role | Notes | Ref. |
|---|---|---|---|---|
| 2019 | L.A. by Night | Hester | Episode: "Witching Time" | |

== Awards and nominations ==
| Year | Award | Category | Nominee | Result |
|---|---|---|---|---|
| 2001 | Saturn Award | Best Supporting Actress on Television | Drusilla in Angel in 2000 | Nominated |
