= Robbie Kay =

British actor

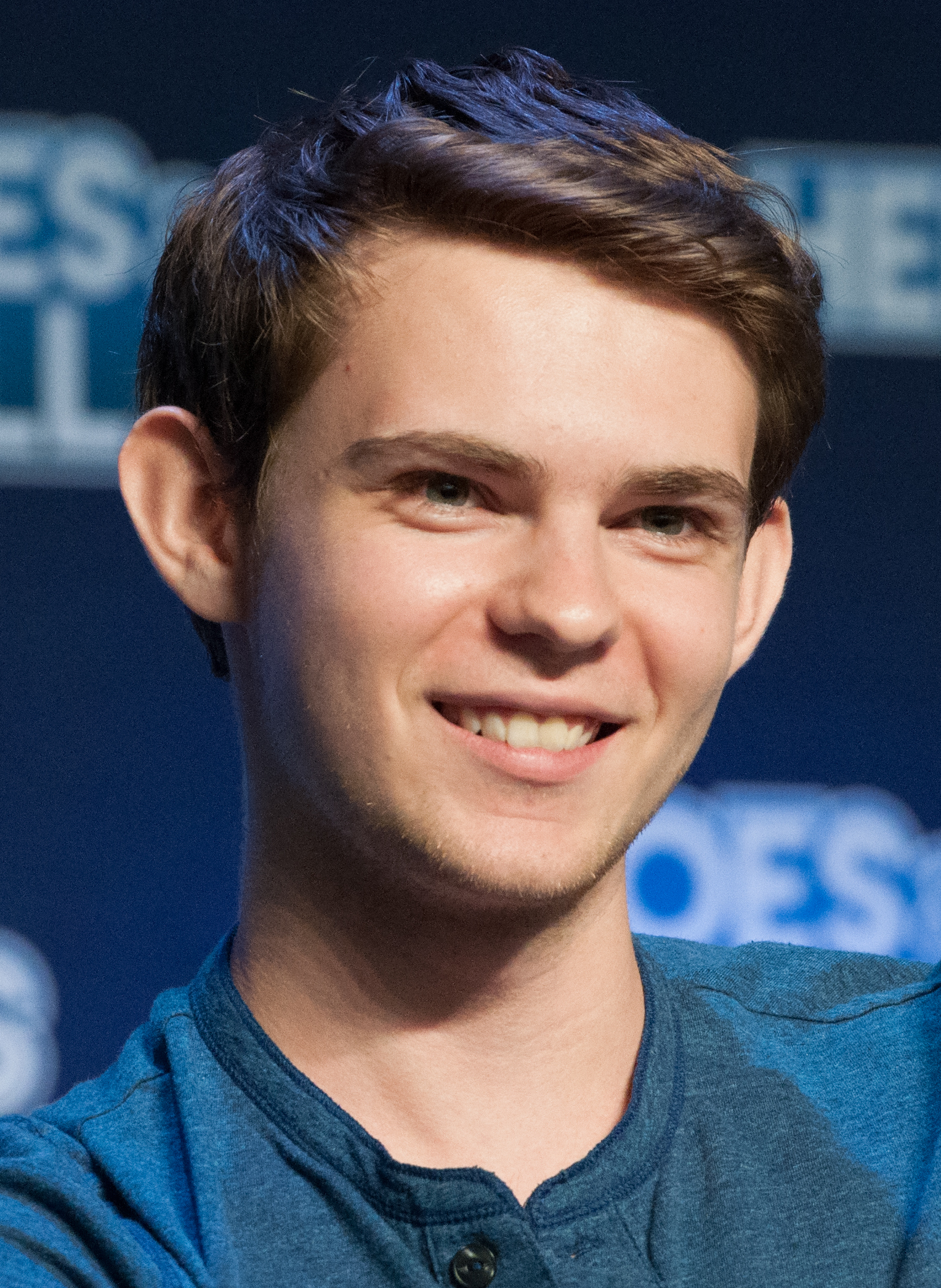
- Kay in 2016
- Born: Lymington, England
- Occupation: Actor
- Years active: 2006–present

Robbie Kay is a British actor whose credits include Fugitive Pieces, Heroes Reborn, Pinocchio, Pirates of the Caribbean: On Stranger Tides, and Once Upon a Time.

== Career ==
Kay's family moved to the Czech Republic where he saw a note on a school noticeboard for English-speaking children to be extras in a film. Despite a lack of previous acting experience, this led to him getting a speaking part in The Illusionist, but his scenes were eventually cut from the film.

After small roles in Hannibal Rising and My Boy Jack, the Canadian production company making Fugitive Pieces asked him to play the part of young Jakob, which involved a 9-week shooting schedule, three of which were on Greek islands.

The people who made Fugitive Pieces had auditioned more than 150 boys before finding 10-year-old Robbie, who had been living in Prague for two years. He spent a year studying acting, singing, and dancing at one of Britain's Stagecoach theatre schools. Kay appeared in the 2008 miniseries Pinocchio, playing the title character. After finishing Pinocchio, he went on to play Sam, a boy diagnosed with leukemia in Ways To Live Forever screening in late 2010. He appeared in Pirates of the Caribbean: On Stranger Tides, playing the Cabin Boy. More recently, he portrayed Peter Pan in Once Upon a Time.

In March 2015, Kay was cast as a high school student named Tommy Clark in the TV series Heroes Reborn.

== Reception ==
Kay's work has been generally well received by the critics. Alicia Cox of Chatelaine wrote on his work in Fugitive Pieces: "Robbie Kay, who plays the young Jakob, gives a remarkable performance with little words and a lot of emotion. When he smiles (which isn't often) you can't help but be affected."

== Personal life ==
Kay was born in Lymington, Hampshire, England, to Ivan and Stephanie Kay. He moved to Brussels, Belgium, at an early age. He has two older sisters.

In 2006, Kay and his family moved to Prague in the Czech Republic, where he attended the International School of Prague. He has been living in Houston, Texas, since 2011.

== Filmography ==
=== Film ===
Year	Title	Role	Notes
2007	Hannibal Rising	Kolnas's son	
2007	My Boy Jack	Arthur Relp	
2007	Fugitive Pieces	Young Jakob	
2008	Bathory	Pals	Voice
2010	Made in Dagenham	Graham	
2010	Ways to Live Forever	Sam McQueen	
2011	Pirates of the Caribbean: On Stranger Tides	Cabin boy	
2015	Flight World War II	Nigel Sheffield	
2016	Cold Moon	Ben Redfield	
2017	No Postage Necessary	Stanley	
2018	Blood Fest	Dax	
2018	Locating Silver Lake	Mack	
2022	Burning at Both Ends	Young German soldier	
2025	Butterfly: A Hillmedo Film	Christina's father	

=== Television ===
Year	Title	Role	Notes
2008	Pinocchio	Pinocchio	2 episodes
2013–2018	Once Upon a Time	Peter Pan	Recurring role (seasons 3, 5); guest role (season 7)
2015–2016	Heroes Reborn	Tommy Clark / Nathan Bennett	Main role
2017	Grey's Anatomy	Christopher Daniels	Episode: "Back Where You Belong"
2017	Sleepy Hollow	Logan MacDonald	2 episodes
2019	The Rookie	Simon Parks Jr.	Episode: "Homefront"
2022	9-1-1	Erik	Episode: "What's Your Fantasy"

=== Video games ===
Year	Title	Role	Notes
2022	Who Pressed Mute on Uncle Marcus	Bradley	
2024	Harry Potter: Quidditch Champions	Ronald Weasley	

== Awards and nominations ==
Year	Award	Category	Nominated work	Result
2009	Young Artist Awards	Best Performance in an International Feature Film – Leading Young Performers	Fugitive Pieces	Nominated
2009	Young Artist Awards	Best Performance in a TV Movie, Miniseries, or Special – Leading Young Actor	Pinocchio	Nominated
2014	Teen Choice Awards	Choice TV: Villain	Once Upon a Time	Nominated
