= Isaach de Bankolé =

Ivorian actor

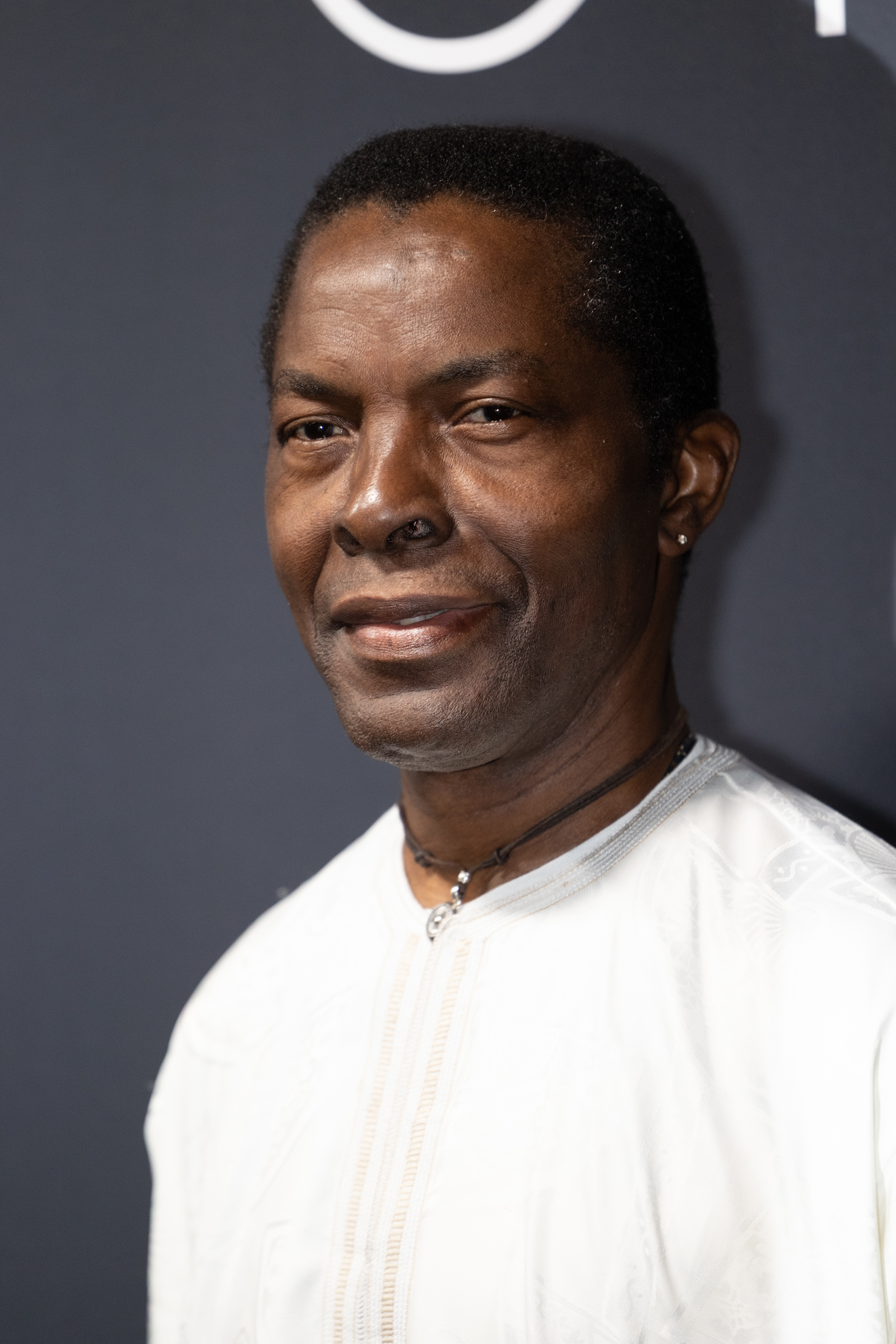
- Bankolé in 2026
- Born: Zachari Bankolé; 12 August 1957 (age 69); Abidjan, Ivory Coast
- Education: University of Paris; Cours Simon
- Occupation: Actor
- Years active: 1984–present
- Spouse: Cassandra Wilson (m. 2000; div. 2003)
- Awards: César Award for Most Promising Actor (1987, Black Mic Mac)
- Honours: Chevalier de la Légion d'honneur

Zachari Bankolé (born 12 August 1957), known professionally as Isaach de Bankolé, is an Ivorian actor, active primarily in France and the United States. He won the 1987 César Award for Most Promising Actor for his performance in the film Black Mic Mac, and rose to international prominence for his starring role in Claire Denis's 1988 film Chocolat.

He is known to international film audiences for his roles in the films of director Jim Jarmusch, Mamadou in James Ivory's A Soldier's Daughter Never Cries (1998), Timothy in Lars von Trier's Manderlay (2005), the villain Steven Obanno in the 2006 James Bond film Casino Royale, and the River Tribe Elder in the Marvel Cinematic Universe superhero film Black Panther (2018) and its 2022 sequel, and Gorden in The Brutalist (2024). He also played President Ule Matobo on the Fox television series 24 (2008–2009).

== Early life and education ==
De Bankolé was born in Abidjan, Ivory Coast, to ethnic Yoruba parents from Benin. His grandparents are from Nigeria. He moved to Paris in 1975 for his last year of lycée, and pursued a master's degree in physics and mathematics at the University of Paris. He then attended an aviation school and earned a private pilot licence, before a chance encounter with French director Gérard Vergez led him to enroll in the Cours Simon, a Parisian drama school.

== Career ==
De Bankolé has appeared in over fifty films, including Jim Jarmusch's Night on Earth, Ghost Dog: The Way of the Samurai, Coffee and Cigarettes and The Limits of Control. He has been based in the United States since 1997. He appeared in the movie Machetero, in the role of a journalist interviewing an imprisoned Puerto Rican revolutionary, along with the members of the New York City-based punk band Ricanstruction.

De Bankolé has also appeared in Lars von Trier's Manderlay. He portrayed Steven Obanno, a terrorist, in the 2006 James Bond film Casino Royale, and "The Lone Man", an assassin in Jim Jarmusch's film, The Limits of Control (2009). In 2013, he starred as Ayodele Balogun in Andrew Dosunmu's Mother of George, which premiered at the 2013 Sundance Film Festival and was the closing night selection for Maryland Film Festival 2013. He has also had roles in Calvary, The Last Witch Hunter, and Black Panther.

== Other activities ==
De Bankolé served on the jury of the 2026 Cannes Film Festival, chaired by Park Chan-wook.

== Recognition ==
In 2007, De Bankolé was ascended to a Knight of the French Legion of Honour for his contributions to the French film industry.

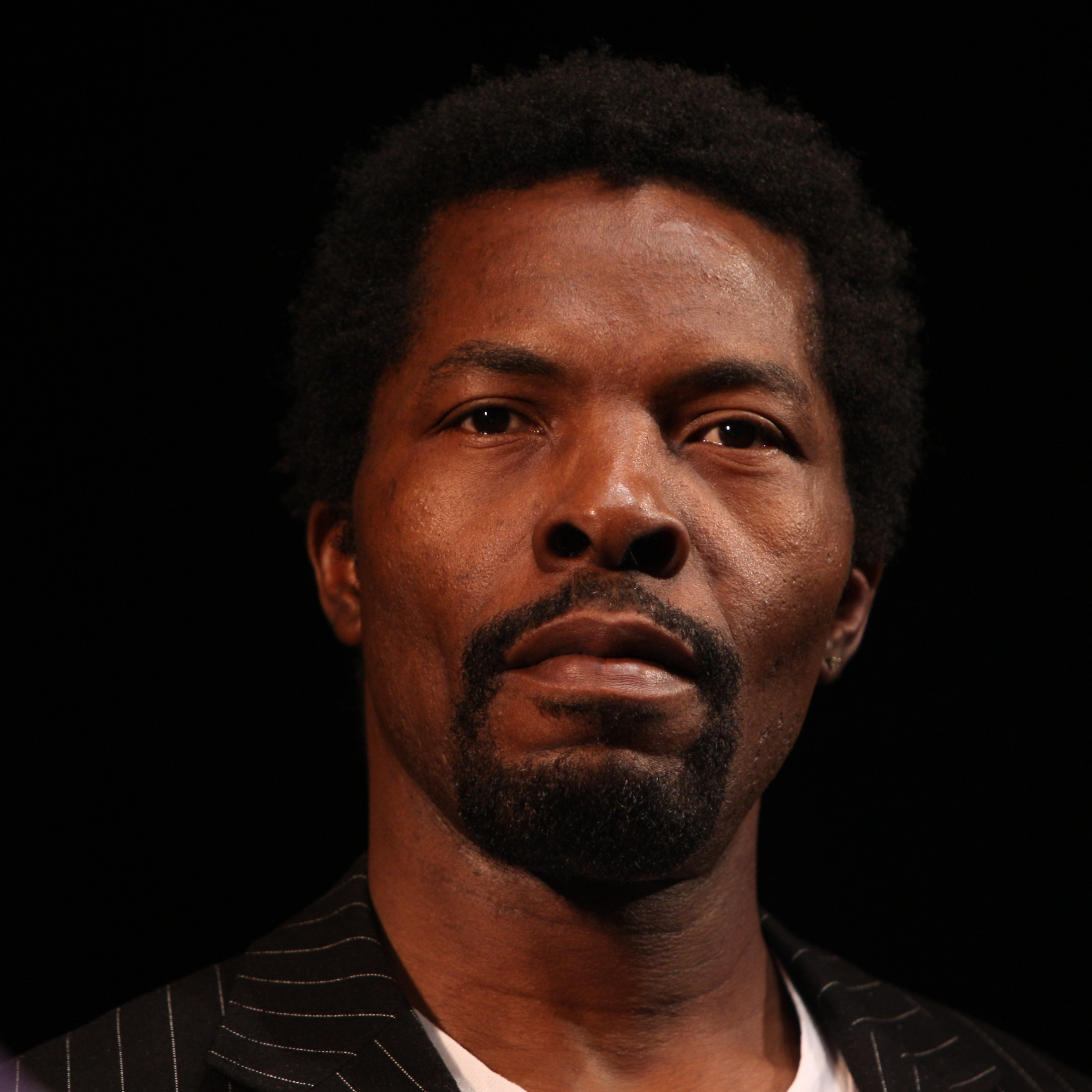
Bankolé in 2009

== Personal life ==
De Bankolé is fluent in Yoruba, Bambara, English, French, and German, and speaks some Italian. He was married to musician Cassandra Wilson from 2000 to 2003.

He has resided in the United States since 1997.

== Acting credits ==
=== Film ===
Year	Title	Role	Notes
1984	Asphalt Warriors	The Blackie	
1984	Comment draguer tous les mecs	Honoré Clair	
1984	L'addition		Uncredited
1986	Black Mic Mac	Lemi	César Award for Most Promising Actor
1986	Taxi Boy	Touré	
1986	Noir et Blanc		
1987	Lady Cops	Inspector Blaise Lacroix	
1988	Chocolat	Protée	
1988	Ada dans la jungle	Bumbo	
1989	How to Make Love to a Negro Without Getting Tired	The Old	
1989	Vanille fraise	Hippolyte N'Go	Also writer
1990	No Fear, No Die	Dah	
1991	Night on Earth	The Driver	
1994	Down to Earth	Leão	
1995	The Keeper	Jean Baptiste	
1998	A Soldier's Daughter Never Cries	Mamadou	
1999	Otomo	Frederic Otomo	
1999	Ghost Dog: The Way of the Samurai	Raymond	
1999	Cherry	Menu Man	
2000	Bàttu	Saar	
2001	3 A.M.	Angus	
2003	Coffee and Cigarettes	Isaach	
2003	The Killing Zone	Malcolm	New York VisionFest – Outstanding Achievement Award – Acting
2004	From Other Worlds	Abraham	
2004	Homework	Jean	
2005	Manderlay	Timothy	
2005	Stay	Professor	
2005	The Skeleton Key	Gas Station Owner	
2005	Before It Had a Name	Waiter	
2006	Casino Royale	Steven Obanno	
2006	Miami Vice	Neptune	
2006	5up 2down	Hunter	
2007	The Diving Bell and the Butterfly	Laurent	
2007	Battle in Seattle	Abasi	
2007	The Fifth Patient	Captain Mugambe	
2008	The Guitar	Roscoe Wasz	
2008	Machetero	Jean Dumont	
2009	White Material	The Boxer	
2009	The Limits of Control	The Lone Man	
2010	Getting High!	Hunter	Short film
2011	Oka!	Bassoun	
2012	Désordres	Vincent	
2013	Mother of George	Ayodele Balogun	
2014	Calvary	Simon	
2014	Run	Assa	Nominated – Trophées du Cinema – Best Supporting Actor
2014	Mirage	Francis	
2014	Where the Road Runs Out	George	
2015	The Last Witch Hunter	Max Schlesinger	
2016	Norman	Jacques	
2017	Double Play	Ernesto	
2018	Black Panther	River Tribe Elder	
2018	Black is Beltza	Wilson Clever	
2019	Shaft	Pierro "Gordito" Carrera	
2020	French Exit	Julius	
2022	Black Panther: Wakanda Forever	River Tribe Elder	
2022	The People We Hate at the Wedding	Henrique	
2024	The Brutalist	Gordon	
2025	The Fence	Alboury	
2026	Dune: Part Three †	Farok	Post-production

=== Television ===
Year	Title	Role	Notes
1992	The Young Indiana Jones Chronicles	Sgt. Barthelmy	Episode: "German East Africa, December 1916"
1993	Heart of Darkness	Mfumu	Television film
2001	The Sopranos	Father Obosi	Episode: "Amour Fou"
2005	L'évangile selon Aîmé	Aîmé	Television film
2006	The Unit	General Togar	Episode: "Force Majeure"
2008	24: Redemption	President Ule Matobo	Television film
2009	24	President Ule Matobo	6 episodes
2010	I Am Slave	Bah	Television film
2013	The Ordained	Mr. Obiku	Television film
2014	White Collar	Luc Renaud	2 episodes
2015	The Good Wife	Larry Oliver	Episode: "Restraint"
2018	Instinct	Ben Richfield	Episode: "Bye Bye Birdie"
2018	Sacred Lies	Dr. Carter Elgin	Episode: "Chapter Eight: Wedding Day"
2019	S.W.A.T.	Aden Syed	Episode: "Monster"
2021–2023	Godfather of Harlem	Monsieur 98	9 episodes
2023	The Boss Baby: Back in the Crib	Sebastian Amadou	Voice; 4 episodes
2024	Parish	Mr. Tongai	Episode: "A Good Man"
2025	Task	Father Daniel Georges	3 episodes

=== Theatre ===
Year	Title	Author	Director	Notes
1986	West Pier	Bernard-Marie Koltès	Patrice Chéreau	Théâtre Nanterre-Amandiers
1987	In the Solitude of Cotton Fields	Bernard-Marie Koltès	Patrice Chéreau	Théâtre Nanterre-Amandiers
1988	Le Retour au désert	Bernard-Marie Koltès	Patrice Chéreau	Théâtre Renaud-Barrault
1989	Strength to Love	Martin Luther King Jr.	Patrice Chéreau	Théâtre Renaud-Barrault

== Awards ==
- 1987 César Award for Most Promising Actor for his role in Black Mic Mac.
