= George Blagden =

British actor (born 1989)

- Born: George Paul Blagden; 28 December 1989 (age 36); London, England
- Education: Guildhall School of Music and Drama (2011)
- Occupation: Actor
- Years active: 2011–present
- Spouse: Laura Pitt-Pulford (m. 2019)
- Children: 1

George Paul Blagden (born 28 December 1989) is an English actor. He is best known for his role as Athelstan in the television series Vikings (2013–2016). He also played Grantaire in the 2012 film adaptation of Les Misérables and Louis XIV in the French-produced television series drama Versailles. He has worked extensively in theatre, with directors such as Jamie Lloyd and Marianne Elliott and has narrated over 40 audiobooks, including the Penguin Classics audiobook version of Homer’s The Odyssey.

== Early life and education ==
Blagden who was raised near to Bury St Edmunds, Suffolk, began singing at age 13, performing in various choirs and his own rock band. After studying at Old Buckenham Hall School, Suffolk, he was accepted into Oundle School with a drama scholarship, and appeared in the school's Stahl Theatre in such roles as The Baker in Into the Woods and Marc in 'Art'. Also while at Oundle, Blagden became a member of the National Youth Theatre and was selected as one of four students to participate in a masterclass with Sir Ian McKellen. Following his graduation, he studied acting at the Guildhall School of Music and Drama, from which he graduated in 2011.

== Personal life ==
Blagden married actress Laura Pitt-Pulford on 29 September 2019.

George has also raised €13000 for the UK Charity the NSPCC by donating memorabilia and his time to promote an online auction for this cause.

== Filmography ==
Film
Year	Title	Role	Notes
2012	Wrath of the Titans	Soldier No. 1	
2012	Les Misérables	Grantaire	National Board of Review Award for Best Cast; Satellite Award for Best Cast – Motion Picture; Washington D.C. Area Film Critics Association Award for Best Ensemble; Nominated—Broadcast Film Critics Association Award for Best Acting Ensemble; Nominated—Phoenix Film Critics Society Award for Best Cast; Nominated—San Diego Film Critics Society Award for Best Performance by an Ensemble; Nominated—Screen Actors Guild Award for Outstanding Performance by a Cast in a Motion Picture
2013	After the Dark	Andy	
2014	Blood Moon	Jake Norman	
2014	Holding on for a Good Time	Fellini	Short
2014	The Tap Tap Lady	Hugh	Short
2015	Blight	Fr Carey	Short; Winner Best Actor - FilmQuest International Film Festival 2016
2017	No Postage Necessary	Sam	
2019	How You Look at Me	Charlie	
2020	The Land of Dreams	Armie	Post-production
2022	The Gallery	Morgan/Dorian	Interactive movie
2022	Rubikon	Gavin Abbott	

Television
Year	Title	Role	Notes
2013–2016	Vikings	Athelstan	Main cast (seasons 1–3); Recurring (season 4); 30 episodes
2015–2018	Versailles	Louis XIV	Leading role
2017	Black Mirror	Lenny	Episode: "Hang the DJ"
2026	Love Through a Prism	Richard Church	Voice; 20 episodes

Video game roles
Year	Title	Role	Notes
2022	The Gallery	Morgan/Dorian	Interactive player
2023	Amnesia: The Bunker	Henri Clement	
2024	Elden Ring Shadow of the Erdtree	Fire Knight Queelign	
2025	The Run	Matteo	

== Theatre ==
Theatre
Year	Title	Role	Notes	Location	Category
2016-2017	Platinum	Simon	Leading role	Hampstead Theatre	Regional
2017	The Pitchfork Disney	Presley Stray	Leading role	Shoreditch Town Hall	Regional
2018	Tartuffe	Damis	Main Cast	Theatre Royal Haymarket	West End
2018-2019	Company	PJ	Main Cast	Gielgud Theatre	West End
2023	White Christmas	Bob	Leading Role	Crucible Theatre	Regional
2024	The Cabinet Minister	Valentine White	Leading Role	Menier Chocolate Factory	Off West End
2026	A Ghost in your Ear	George	Leading Role	Hampstead Theatre	Regional
2026	Kiss of the Spider Woman	Valentin	Leading role	UK Tour	
2026	Love Never Dies	Raoul	Main cast	London Palladium	West End
2027	The Popinjay Cavalier	TBA	Supporting cast	Phoenix Theatre	West End

== Awards ==
Year	Award	Category	Film	Result
2012	National Board of Review of Motion Pictures	Best Acting by an Ensemble	Les Misérables	Won
2012	National Board of Review of Motion Pictures	Best Ensemble	Les Misérables	Won
2012	San Diego Film Critics Society	Best Ensemble Performance	Les Misérables	Nominated
2012	Satellite Awards	Best Ensemble, Motion Picture	Les Misérables	Won
2012	Washington D.C. Area Film Critics Association	Best Acting Ensemble	Les Misérables	Won
2013	Screen Actors Guild Awards	Outstanding Performance by a Cast in a Motion Picture	Les Misérables	Nominated
