= Michael Beach =

American actor (born 1963)

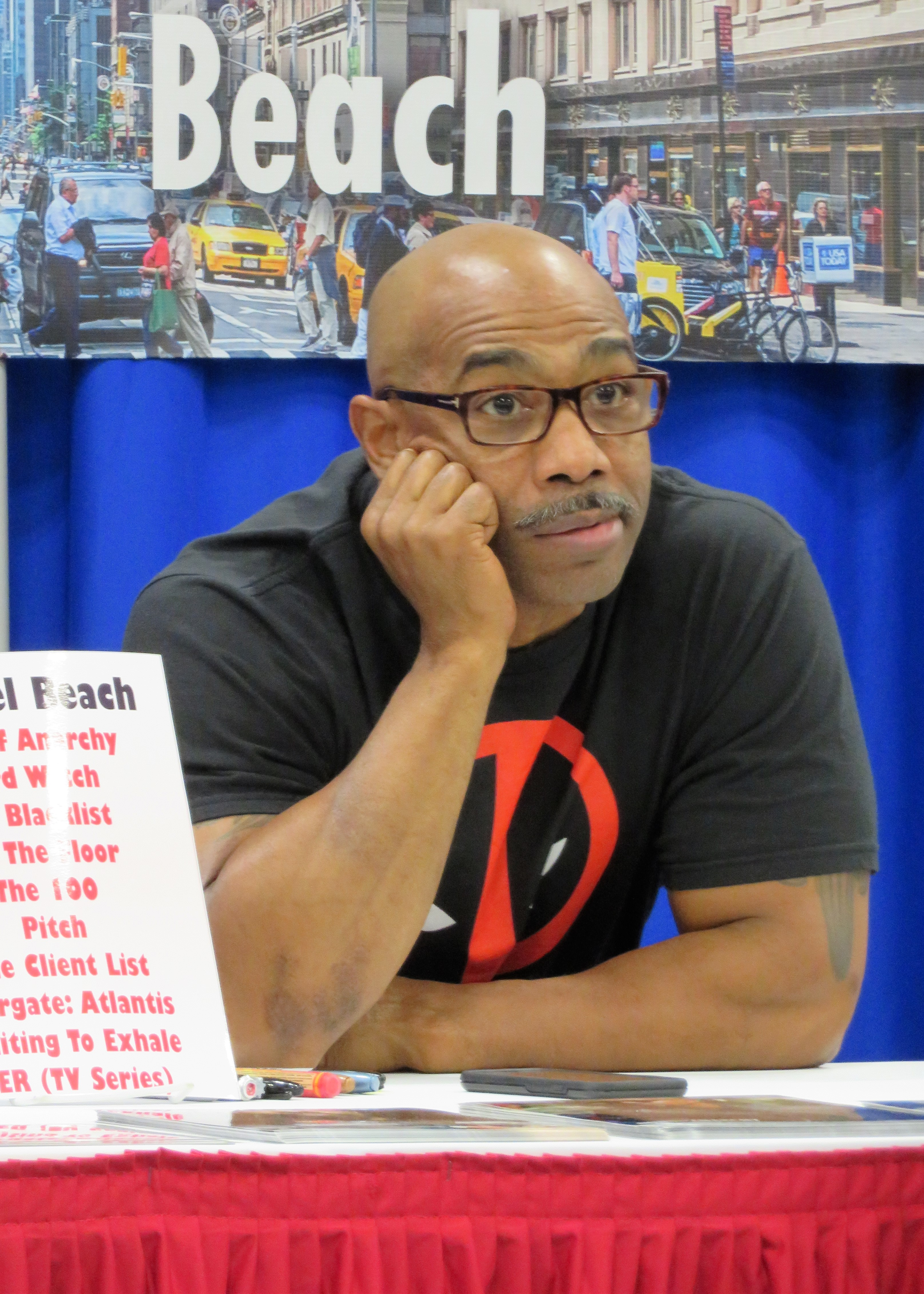
- Beach in 2017
- Born: Michael Anthony Beach; October 30, 1963 (age 63); Roxbury, Massachusetts, U.S.
- Education: Juilliard School (BFA)
- Occupation: Actor
- Years active: 1986–present
- Spouses: Tracey Beach (m. 1990; div. 2006) Elisha Wilson (m. 2007)
- Children: 8

Michael Anthony Beach (born October 30, 1963) is an American actor. He has appeared in the films Lean on Me (1989), One False Move (1992), True Romance (1993), Short Cuts (1993), Waiting to Exhale (1995), A Family Thing (1996), Soul Food (1997), Aquaman (2018), If Beale Street Could Talk (2018), and Saw X (2023). On television, he played Al Boulet on the NBC medical drama ER from 1995 to 1997. From 1999 to 2005, Beach was a regular cast member in another NBC drama series, Third Watch, as Monte Parker, and as T.O. Cross in FX's Sons of Anarchy. Beach is widely known for portraying characters in multiple crime dramas including Blue Bloods (2010), S.W.A.T. (2017) and The Rookie (2018).

== Early life ==
Beach was born in Roxbury, Massachusetts, on October 30, 1963. He attended High School at the Noble and Greenough School in Dedham,MA.He graduated from Juilliard School with a degree for the Bachelor of Fine Arts. His mother, Barbara Gomes-Beach, was of Portuguese and African descent.

== Career ==
Beach's big screen debut was in End of the Line in 1987, and he went on to appear opposite Morgan Freeman and Beverly Todd in Lean on Me (1989). Beach also co-starred in films including Internal Affairs, Cadence (both 1990), One False Move (1992) with Cynda Williams, Short Cuts and True Romance (both 1993).

Beach's big break came in 1995, playing Angela Bassett's unfaithful husband in the comedy-drama film Waiting to Exhale. In 1997, he played Vanessa L. Williams's unfaithful husband in the comedy-drama film Soul Food. On television, he played a recurring role as Al Boulet, the ex-husband of physician assistant Jeanie Boulet (Gloria Reuben) in the NBC medical drama ER from 1995 to 1997. From 1999 to 2005, Beach was a regular cast member in the NBC drama series Third Watch, playing FDNY paramedic Monte 'Doc' Parker.

Beach has had guest-starring roles on Law & Order, Law & Order: Special Victims Unit, Brothers & Sisters, Criminal Minds, Grey's Anatomy, The Closer, and The Blacklist. He was also a regular on the short-lived NBC series Crisis in 2014, and had recurring roles on Stargate Atlantis, Sons of Anarchy, The Client List, The Game, Secrets and Lies, S.W.A.T. and The 100. Most recently he has had a guest-starring role in seasons 6 and 7 of Chicago P.D. as Darius Walker, a drug dealer and community philanthropist turned confidential informant.

In December 2022, Beach was confirmed by Deadline Hollywood to have signed on to appear in Saw X, the tenth installment of the Saw film series, for release in October 2023.

== Personal life ==
Beach married Tracey Beach in 1990, and their marriage lasted until their divorce in 2006. The following year, he married Elisha Wilson.

== Filmography ==
=== Film ===
Year	Title	Role	Notes
1986	Vengeance: The Story of Tony Cimo	Rudolph Tyner	TV movie
1986	Streets of Gold	Sonny	
1987	End of the Line	Alvin	
1987	Suspect	Parking Lot Attendant	
1988	Weekend War	Wiley	TV movie
1988	In a Shallow Grave	Quintus Pearch	
1988	Open Admissions	Calvin Jefferson	TV movie
1989	Lean on Me	Mr. Darnell	
1989	The Abyss	Barnes	
1990	Internal Affairs	Dorian Fletcher	
1990	Dangerous Passion	Steve	TV movie
1990	Cadence	Webb	
1991	Fire: Trapped on the 37th Floor	Perez	TV movie
1991	Guilty as Charged	Hamilton	
1991	Late for Dinner	Dr. David Arrington	
1992	One False Move	Lane 'Pluto' Franklin	
1993	The Hit List	Detective Akin	
1993	Another Round	Tyrell	Short
1993	Short Cuts	Jim Stone	
1993	True Romance	Detective Wurlitzer	
1993	Final Appeal	Detective Thorne	TV movie
1994	Knight Rider 2010	Marshal Will McQueen	TV movie
1994	Midnight Run for Your Life	Pemberton	TV movie
1995	Bad Company	Tod Stapp	
1995	Sketch Artist II: Hands That See	George	TV movie
1995	White Man's Burden	Policeman	
1995	Waiting to Exhale	John Harris Sr.	
1996	A Family Thing	Virgil Murdoch	
1996	Rebound: The Legend of Earl Manigault	Legrand	TV movie
1996	Dr. Hugo	Hobbs	Short
1997	Casualties	Clark Cooper	
1997	Soul Food	Miles Jenkins	
1997	Ms. Scrooge	Reverend Luke	TV movie
1998	Johnny Skidmarks	Mike	
1998	A Room Without Doors	Dee	Short
1999	Asunder	Michael Hubbs	
1999	Made Men	Miles/The Skipper	
2002	Crazy as Hell	Ty Adams	
2002	Critical Assembly	FBI Agent Winston	TV movie
2006	Lenexa, 1 Mile	Paddy	
2006	Like Mike 2: Streetball	Jerome "Double J" Jenkins, Sr.	Video
2008	First Sunday	Deacon	
2008	Hell Ride	Goody Two Shoes	
2008	Stargate: The Ark of Truth	Colonel Abe Ellis	Video
2009	Relative Stranger	James Clemons	TV movie
2009	Pastor Brown	Avery Callagan	
2009	Play Dead	Devon	Video
2011	Justice for Natalee Holloway	Agent Delaney	TV movie
2012	David E. Talbert Presents: A Fool and His Money	-	Video
2012	Sparkle	Reverend Bryce	
2012	Red Dawn	Mayor Jenkins	
2013	Broken City	Tony Jansen	
2013	500 MPH Storm	Simon Caprisi	
2013	Notes from Dad	Manny Gauza	TV movie
2013	Scrapper	Hollis Wallace	
2013	Assassins Tale	Roman	
2013	Things Never Said	Will Jackson	
2013	Insidious: Chapter 2	Detective Sendal	
2013	The Exchange	Howard	Short
2014	Only Light	Roy	Short
2015	Megachurch Murder	Clay King	
2015	CSI: Immortality	Harbor Patrol SD Scinta	TV movie
2015	The Submarine Kid	Marc	
2016	Patriots Day	Governor Deval Patrick	
2016	The Bounce Back	George	
2017	No Postage Necessary	Harry	
2018	Parker's Anchor	Clinton	
2018	Deep Blue Sea 2	Carl Durant	Video
2018	Canal Street	Ronald Morgan	
2018	If Beale Street Could Talk	Frank Hunt	
2018	Gosnell: The Trial of America's Biggest Serial Killer	DA Dan Molinari	
2018	Aquaman	Jesse Kane	
2019	#Truth	Kenneth Little	
2019	Sunny Daze	Mickey	
2019	Rim of the World	General Khoury	
2019	Soliloquy or The Goose	Father Duck (voice)	Short
2019	Foster Boy	Bill Randolph	
2020	Inheritance	Harold Thewlis	
2020	Superintelligence	General Saul Gomez	
2021	Midnight in the Switchgrass	Detective Yarbrough	
2021	Real Talk	Father Daniels	
2021	The Harder They Fall	Nat Love's Father	
2021	Unspoken	Dr. Berman	Short
2022	Immanence	Jonah	
2022	The Devil You Know	Greg Hansen	
2022	The Royal	-	
2023	Saw X	Henry Kessler	
2023	I'll Be Right There	Albert	
2023	God's Grace: The Sheila Johnson Story	Dillard	
2024	Shelby Oaks	Det. Allen Burke	
2026	Dirty Hands	Dally	
TBA	Empire City	TBA	Post-production

=== Television ===
Year	Title	Role	Notes
1988	The Street	Officer Sheppard Scott	Main cast
1989	ABC Afterschool Special	Jake	Episode: "Taking a Stand"
1990	Shannon's Deal	Monty Coles	Episode: "Inside Straight"
1991	Gabriel's Fire	Michael Austin	Episode: "Birds Gotta Fly"
1991	Quantum Leap	Nathaniel Simpson	Episode: "Justice: May 11, 1965"
1991	Veronica Clare	Unknown role	Episode: "Deadly Minds"
1993	Walker, Texas Ranger	Randy Warren	Episode: "Night of the Gladiator"
1994	South Central	Isaiah Washington	Recurring cast
1994	NYPD Blue	Officer Frank Quint	Recurring cast: Season 2
1994	Sweet Justice	Jonah	Episode: "In the Name of the Son"
1994–1995	Under Suspicion	Detective Desmond Beck	Main cast
1995	Law & Order	Mr. Elliot	Episode: "Purple Heart"
1995	Touched by an Angel	Sam Mitchell	Episode: "Reunion"
1995–1997	ER	Al Boulet	Recurring cast: Season 2–4
1998	The Wonderful World of Disney	Abon Bridges	Episode: "Ruby Bridges"
1999	Todd McFarlane's Spawn	Terry Fitzgerald (voice)	Recurring cast
1999–2005	Third Watch	Paramedic Monte "Doc" Parker	Main cast: Season 1–5, Guest: Season 6
2004	Law & Order: Special Victims Unit	Andy Abbott	Episode: "Lowdown"
2004–2006	Justice League Unlimited	Mister Terrific (Michael Holt), Devil Ray (voices)	Guest: Season 1, Recurring cast: Season 3
2006	Brothers & Sisters	Noah Guare	Recurring cast: Season 1
2006	Without a Trace	Chuck Barr	Episode: "The Calm Before"
2007	Shark	Lester Space	Episode: "Student Body"
2007	Criminal Minds	Father Marks	Episode: "Lucky"
2007–2009	Stargate Atlantis	Colonel Abe Ellis	Guest: Season 3 & 5, Recurring cast: Season 4
2009	Numbers	Len Walsh	Episode: "Jacked"
2009	Soul	Isaiah	Recurring cast
2009	The Cleaner	Lonnie Simon	Recurring cast: Season 2
2010	Lie to Me	James	Episode: "Teacher and Pupils"
2010–2014	Sons of Anarchy	Taddarius Orwell 'T.O.' Cross	Recurring cast: Season 3 & 7, Guest: Season 5
2011	Grey's Anatomy	Mr. Baker	Episode: "Not Responsible"
2011	Criminal Minds: Suspect Behavior	Detective Wayne Sanderson	Episode: "Death by a Thousand Cuts"
2011	The Closer	Coach Rich Carr	Episode: "Necessary Evil"
2011–2015	The Game	Roger Keith	Recurring cast: Season 4 & 8, Guest: Season 5-6 & 9
2012	Celebrity Ghost Stories	Himself	Episode: "Erin Moran/Pia Zadora/Michael Beach"
2012	NCIS	Metro Detective Robert Flowers	Episode: "A Desperate Man"
2012	A Gifted Man	Nicky Davis	Episode: "In Case of Co-Dependants"
2013	Southland	Detective Williams	Episode: "Reckoning"
2013	The Client List	Harold Clemens	Recurring cast: Season 2
2014	Crisis	FBI Director William Olsen	Main cast
2015	The Blacklist	Brad Marking	Recurring cast: Season 2
2015	Secrets and Lies	Arthur Fenton	Recurring cast: Season 1
2015	Battle Creek	Larry Duncan	Episode: "Homecoming"
2016	Hit the Floor	James Howard	Episode: "Upset"
2016	Blue Bloods	FBI Agent Adam Parker	Episode: "Down the Rabbit Hole"
2016	Pitch	Bill Baker	Recurring cast
2016–2019	The 100	Charles Pike	Recurring cast: Season 3, Guest: Season 6
2017	Scorpion	Sandhog Chief	Episode: "The Hole Truth"
2017	Doubt	Jacob Ward	Episode: "Top Dog/Underdog"
2017	Lethal Weapon	Bryan Graves	Episode: "Fork-Getta-Bout-It"
2017	Dynasty	Police Chief Aaron Stansfield	Recurring cast: Season 1
2017–2024	S.W.A.T.	Leroy Henderson	Guest: Season 1 & 7, Recurring cast: Season 2 & 4-5
2018	Unsolved	Detective Kelly Cooper	Episode: "Wherever It Leads"
2018	Animal Kingdom	Smurf's Attorney	Recurring cast: Season 3
2018–2019	For the People	Douglas Delap	Recurring cast
2018–2024	The Rookie	Percy West	Recurring cast: Season 1 & 3, Guest: Season 6
2019	Barry	Police Detective	Episode: "The Power of No"
2019	Swamp Thing	Nathan Ellery	Recurring cast
2019–2020	Chicago P.D.	Darius Walker	Recurring cast: Season 7
2019–2020	All Rise	Rick Kramer	Recurring cast: Season 1
2019–2021	Truth Be Told	Ingram Rhoades	Main cast: Season 1–2
2020	Stumptown	Major Elders	Episode: "The Dex File"
2020	Cherish the Day	Ben	Recurring cast: Season 1
2020	Two Degrees	Mike	Episode: "Cigar Cave"
2020	SEAL Team	Chaplain Ryan Walker	Recurring cast: Season 3, Guest: Season 4
2021–2024	Mayor of Kingstown	Captain Kareem Moore	Recurring cast: Season 1-2, Main cast: Season 3
2022–2025	Law & Order	Defense Attorney Brian Harris	3 episodes
2022	Dahmer – Monster: The Jeffrey Dahmer Story	Detective Dennis Murphy	Recurring cast
2022–2025	Tulsa King	Mark Mitchell	12 episodes
2022–2024	Kingdom Business	Calvin Jordan	Main cast
2024	Dead Boy Detectives	Tragic Mick	Recurring cast
2024	The Perfect Couple	Detective Dan Carter	Main cast
2024	Secret Level	Nik Hanston	Episode: "Exodus: Odyssey"; voice

=== Video games ===
Year	Title	Role	Notes
2020	Madden 21	Reggie Brown	Also motion capture
