= Mission: Impossible season 1 =

Mission: Impossible
- Season 1
- No. of episodes: 28

Release
- Original network: CBS
- Original release: September 17, 1966 – April 22, 1967

Season chronology
- Next → Season 2

The first season of the original Mission: Impossible, as created by Bruce Geller, premiered on CBS on September 17, 1966 and concluded on April 22, 1967. It originally aired Saturdays at 9:00–10:00 pm (EST) on CBS from September 17, 1966 to January 7, 1967 and at 8:30–9:30 pm (EST) from January 14 to April 22, 1967.

== Cast ==
=== Main ===
- Steven Hill as Dan Briggs^{a}
- Barbara Bain as Cinnamon Carter^{b}
- Greg Morris as Barney Collier^{c}
- Peter Lupus as Willy Armitage^{d}

=== Recurring ===
- Martin Landau as Rollin Hand^{e}

a All Episodes except Episode 23 "Action!"
b Entire season (does not appear in episodes 11, 13, 16, 18)
c Entire season (does not appear in episodes 9, 13, 18)
d Entire season (does not appear in episodes 9, 11-14, 16, 20)
e (Does not appear in episodes 12, 14)

== Episodes ==
No. overall	No. in season	Title	Directed by	Written by	Original release date	Prod. code
1	1	"Pilot"	Bernard L. Kowalski	Bruce Geller	September 17, 1966	1
In order to remove two nuclear warheads from a Caribbean island (and prevent their imminent use), the Impossible Missions Force ("IMF") team enters a hotel being used as the headquarters of the island's dictator so that the team members may gain access to the hotel's vault where the warheads are being kept. Martin Landau plays the role of the dictator as well as his regular role of Rollin Hand (throughout the first season, Landau does not appear in the opening credits but is credited during the dossier scene). Wally Cox appears as IMF agent Terry Targo, a skilled safe cracker. The Los Angeles Griffith Park Observatory is used to film the exterior of the hotel. This episode is notable because the mission instructions voiced by Bob Johnson are delivered from a vinyl LP instead of a tape. The 2015 film, Mission: Impossible – Rogue Nation, uses a pastiche of this opening in homage to the pilot's tape scene, where the team leader enters an unusual shop (an oddities store in the pilot and a vintage record shop in the movie) and asks for an obscure record. It is also the only episode of the series written by creator Bruce Geller.
2	2	"Memory"	Charles R. Rondeau	Robert Lewin	September 24, 1966	3
Joseph Baresh (Albert Paulsen), an IMF agent with a photographic memory, allows himself to be captured and subjected to a harsh interrogation to help destroy a politically connected mass murderer (William Keene). This is the only "regular-format" episode in which the IMF does not receive its mission instructions from a recording during the tape scene and, as such, the voice of Bob Johnson is not heard; instead, IMF team leader Dan Briggs is handed a card with printed instructions while on a city sidewalk in public view.
3	3	"Operation Rogosh"	Leonard J. Horn	Jerome Ross	October 1, 1966	4
When a sadistic unbreakable foreign agent (Fritz Weaver) known as "The Monster" who specializes in mass murder is discovered in Los Angeles, the IMF team needs to break him (only to discover a planned biological attack on Los Angeles area water system). The team must trick him into revealing the location of his biological devices by convincing him that it is three years into the future, he is back in his own country, and he is on trial for being an American spy. The IMF uses his fear of dying by his own devices to find the devices; in a twist ending Rogosh is not killed by the IMF nor arrested by the US government; however he is shown being picked up by his own embassy car for a one way ride by his superior officer who knows Rogosh has both failed in his mission/and been broken and told his capturers everything...This is the first episode in which the apartment scene is not used in the opening act.
4	4	"Old Man Out: Part 1"	Charles R. Rondeau	Ellis Marcus	October 8, 1966	2A
With the rest of IMF team posing as a traveling circus performing in a city park next to an impregnable prison, Rollin allows himself to be imprisoned to rescue physically infirm Cardinal Vossek (Cyril Delevanti), the leader of a country's freedom movement who was arrested and held in the prison for interrogation (and then scheduled for execution). Vosseck is overtly based upon Cardinal József Mindszenty and his high-profile imprisonment by a totalitarian government in the Eastern Bloc. Mary Ann Mobley appears as IMF agent Crystal Walker. Plans are made for Rollin to infiltrate the prison in the middle of a circus and then find a way to break out the Cardinal. These plans go awry when the Cardinal is transferred to another cell. Guest stars Oscar Bergi and Monte Markham
5	5	"Old Man Out: Part 2"	Charles R. Rondeau	Ellis Marcus	October 15, 1966	2B
Continuation of the previous episode. The team's rescue plan hit a snag at the end of the previous episode when Cardinal Vossek was transferred to another cell.
6	6	"Odds on Evil"	Charles R. Rondeau	William Read Woodfield & Allan Balter	October 22, 1966	5
In order to prevent an arms delivery to prince Kostas (Nehemiah Persoff) of a principality by an arms dealer Borgman (Vincent Van Lynn) and to make sure that he cannot buy more (so that he is prevented from attacking an oil-rich, neighboring state), the IMF team enters a casino, utilizes a wearable computer to predict the winning number in a game of roulette (with the winning number being displayed as the date on an analog watch), and rigs a game of baccarat through the use of marked cards and special contact lenses. Kostas is forced to pay gambling debts with the money he set aside for arm purchases: Borgman cancels the arms delivery. Nico Minardos appears as IMF agent Andre Malif. This episode has similarities with Ian Fleming's Casino Royale.
7	7	"Wheels"	Tom Gries	Laurence Heath	October 29, 1966	8
In order to unfix the election result in a foreign country (and prevent the police-controlled Nationalist party from establishing a terrorist dictatorship), the IMF team enters a police station being used as both a polling place and the headquarters of the party so that Barney may gain access to the station's backroom where the two fixed voting machines rigged with three "zero" wheels are being kept. (Barney accomplishes his task despite being wounded by the Nationalists) Landau plays a proprietor of a bookstore/and as a party worker of the Liberate party as well as his regular role of Rollin Hand. Mark Lenard appears as the Nationalist party's unscrupulous candidate/Leader. Percy Rodriguez stars as a police captain
8	8	"The Ransom"	Harry Harris	William Read Woodfield & Allan Balter	November 5, 1966	9
When a friend's daughter is kidnapped by a crime boss and held as ransom for the exchange of an informant held in protective custody, Briggs calls in the IMF team to rescue her. This is the first episode in which the tape scene is not used to provide mission instructions; instead, the mission is developed by the team as an "off-book" mission (and the only one led by Dan Briggs). Also, this is the first instance in which the team confronts members of a domestic criminal organization.
9	9	"A Spool There Was"	Bernard L. Kowalski	Ellis Marcus	November 12, 1966	6
Rollin and Cinnamon pose as reunited ex-lovers in an unfriendly country in order to retrieve a spool of recording wire hidden by an agent killed while evading capture. Neither Barney nor Willy appear in this episode. Michael Shea appears as Pieter Stakovar.
10	10	"The Carriers"	Sherman Marks	William Read Woodfield & Allan Balter	November 19, 1966	13
In order to stop an expert in American traditions, slang, and customs (Arthur Hill) from conducting his plan of bacteriological warfare against the U.S. and to put him permanently out of business, the IMF team infiltrates a mock-up of an American town located behind the Iron Curtain where enemy agents learn to act as Americans. George Takei appears as IMF agent Roger Lee. The theme of using a mock-up of a town for training enemy agents was previously employed in the second-season episode "Colony Three" (S02/E03) of Danger Man and later in the fourth-season episode "Welcome to Liberty Village" (S04/E05) of Alias. Also, this episode has similarities with Ian Fleming's novel On Her Majesty's Secret Service.
11	11	"Zubrovnik's Ghost"	Leonard J. Horn	Robert Lewin	November 26, 1966	11
In this "haunted house" episode, a scientist (Beatrice Straight) is being asked to defect by the ghost of her late husband. In order to keep her from going behind the Iron Curtain and to get her working for the IMF again, Rollin, Barney, and IMF agent Ariana Domi (Martine Bartlett) pose as a psychic research team, countering the efforts of a medium (Donald Davis) who is pressuring her to work from behind the Iron Curtain. Neither Cinnamon nor Willy appear in this episode. The laboratory set (including the hallway and elevator) from "The Carriers" (the previous episode) is featured in the tape scene of this episode.
12	12	"Fakeout"	Bernard L. Kowalski	Leigh Chapman	December 3, 1966	7
With an ill-mannered leader of an international narcotics syndicate (Lloyd Bridges) living in a country that has no extradition treaty with the U.S., Cinnamon romances him in order to get him out of the country so that he can be legally arrested and stand trial in the U.S. (kidnapping him has been ruled out as being politically embarrassing). Neither Rollin nor Willy appear in this episode.
13	13	"Elena"	Marc Daniels	Ellis Marcus	December 10, 1966	10
When a woman named Elena (Barbara Luna) acting as a key agent of the IMF begins to behave in a bizarre manner indicating a severe emotional disturbance, Rollin and a psychiatrist (Barry Atwater) need to find out in six days why she is behaving so strangely and decide whether she will continue to be a dangerous threat to the IMF; if not, she will be killed. Neither Cinnamon, nor Barney, nor Willy appear in this episode, making it the only episode of the entire series in which none of the series regulars featured in the opening credits are chosen by the IMF team leader for the mission during the dossier scene as well as the only episode of the entire series in which only one main character appeared. The laboratory set (including the hallway and elevator) from "The Carriers" (S01/E10) is featured in this episode.
14	14	"The Short Tail Spy"	Leonard J. Horn	Julian Barry	December 17, 1966	14
Two feuding assassins of different ages representing two groups of an enemy country are focused on assassinating a professor who recently defected to the U.S. In order to prevent the assassinations and totally discredit the younger assassin and the group for whom he represents, Cinnamon feigns her love for the younger assassin (Eric Braeden), Dan works to move the older assassin (Albert Dekker) out of the way, and Barney protects the professor (Edward Colmans). Neither Rollin nor Willy appear in this episode.
15	15	"The Legacy"	Michael O'Herlihy	William Read Woodfield & Allan Balter	January 7, 1967	15
In this "treasure hunt" episode, sons of Adolf Hitler's most trusted Nazi officers gather in Zurich, Switzerland, to locate Hitler's "personal fortune" believed to be worth more than $300 million. Rollin infiltrates the group in order to get the money before they do (and prevent them from launching the Fourth Reich). This episode was remade as "The Legacy" (S01/E05) in the series remake (wherein "sons" was changed to "grandsons"). There are three other episodes of the original series that have been remade for the series remake: "The Condemned" (S02/E19 & S01/E04), "The System" (S03/E15 & S01/E02), and "The Killer" (S05/E01 & S01/E01).
16	16	"The Reluctant Dragon"	Leonard J. Horn	Chester Krumholz	January 14, 1967	16
An expert in rocket control (Joseph Campanella) working from behind the Iron Curtain was supposed to follow his wife (Mala Powers) in defecting to the U.S. a year earlier, but he was reluctant in leaving. Now that he has made a simple but extremely effective anti-ballistic missile system that could completely destroy the balance of power in the world if it were to fall into the wrong hands, Rollin poses as a police deputy commissioner of East Germany in order to get him out before his government discovers what he has achieved. John Colicos appears as the head of security who is suspicious of the expert. Neither Cinnamon nor Willy appear in this episode.
17	17	"The Frame"	Allen H. Miner	William Read Woodfield & Allan Balter	January 21, 1967	17
When four elected officials are killed in "accidents" and replaced with persons favorably disposed toward organized crime, Dan and Rollin pose as caterers for a lavish get-together at the home of the U.S. syndicate boss (Simon Oakland) in order to stop him from expanding into government. Arthur Batanides appears as IMF agent known as Tino.
18	18	"The Trial"	Lewis Allan	Laurence Heath	January 28, 1967	12
Dan allows himself to be arrested, charged, and subjected to a show trial as a would-be saboteur in order to stop and discredit a public prosecutor and the head of the secret police (Carroll O'Connor) so that he will never be a political threat or threaten international peace. Neither Cinnamon nor Barney appear in this episode.
19	19	"The Diamond"	Robert Douglas	William Read Woodfield & Allan Balter	February 4, 1967	18
When the despotic prime minister of a white-supremacist West African regime attempts to sell the world's largest uncut diamond in order to finance a campaign driving the native majority off their tribal trust lands, the IMF Force is sent to destroy him.
20	20	"The Legend"	Richard Benedict	Mann Rubin	February 11, 1967	19
Dan and Cinnamon impersonate a former Nazi and his daughter who are invited to attend a reunion of aged Nazi leaders at the home of Nazi fugitive Martin Bormann, who is planning the creation of the Fourth Reich. This episode shares many similarities with Alfred Hitchcock's Notorious. Willy did not appear in this episode.
21	21	"Snowball in Hell"	Lee H. Katzin	Judith & Robert Guy Barrows	February 18, 1967	21
The IMF must recover or destroy a vital component for a nuclear weapon that is in the hands of an evil prison warden (Ricardo Montalbán), and make sure that the warden does not give the formula to anyone else.
22	22	"The Confession"	Herschel Daugherty	William Read Woodfield & Allan Balter	February 25, 1967	20
When the assassination of a U.S. senator (Kent Smith) by a Communist bloc agent (David Sheiner) threatens to lead to war between America and the Communist Bloc, Dan and the IMF set out to prove the killing was actually orchestrated by the senator's principal backer (Pat Hingle). This episode has a last minute twist ending that surprises even the IMF Team!
23	23	"Action!"	Leonard J. Horn	Robert Lewin	March 4, 1967	22
An Eastern European filmmaker plans to release a film he created to falsely allege an American war crime in Vietnam; the IMF must prove the film to be a fake. Cinnamon Carter receives the recorded instructions in this episode, the only time in the show's history (the original or the 1988 revival) that someone other than Dan Briggs or Jim Phelps ever received the briefing as well as the only time in the entire series that the lead character is absent. The character of Dan Briggs does not appear in the episode. The voice in the tape says "Good morning, Ms. Carter", and the apartment scene takes place in Rollin's apartment rather than Dan's.
24	24	"The Train"	Ralph Senensky	William Read Woodfield & Allan Balter	March 18, 1967	23
The IMF team must simulate a train ride carrying a dying prime minister to a Swiss hospital, to convince the leader that his chosen successor (William Windom) would become an oppressive dictator upon his ascension. Beginning with this episode, appearances by Steven Hill were scaled back in preparation for his departure from the series.
25	25	"Shock"	Lee H. Katzin	Laurence Heath	March 25, 1967	24
When an American envoy is kidnapped and replaced by a disguised agent planning to assassinate a U.S. diplomat, the IMF must stop the assassination and elicit the whereabouts of the real envoy out of the enemy agent. The envoy, the imposter and a disguised Dan are all played by James Daly, allowing Steven Hill to be absent for most of this episode.
26	26	"A Cube of Sugar"	Joseph Pevney	William Read Woodfield & Allan Balter	April 1, 1967	25
The IMF meets drug culture as Rollin and Cinnamon infiltrate a prison to recover a kidnapped agent as well as a microchip hidden within an LSD-laced sugar cube.
27	27	"The Traitor"	Lee H. Katzin	Edward J. Lakso	April 15, 1967	26
Eartha Kitt guest stars as a contortionist recruited by Dan to help discredit an agent who has defected to the enemy.
28	28	"The Psychic"	Charles R. Rondeau	William Read Woodfield & Allan Balter	April 22, 1967	27
Cinnamon poses as a psychic to convince a tycoon that his life is in danger, leading to a high-stakes poker game against Rollin. This is the final episode in which Steven Hill appears as Dan Briggs. Note that in the opening sequence, the drive-in marquee reads: GELLER AND SOLOW, "Spend the money". Geller is Bruce Geller, the show's creator, while Solow is Herbert F Solow, the Executive in Charge of Production. "Spend The Money" is an inside joke, referring to the tendency of the show's production to often go well over their assigned budget.
