= Mission: Impossible (1988 TV series) =

1988 television series

- Genre: Action; Spy fiction
- Created by: Bruce Geller
- Starring: Peter Graves; Thaao Penghlis; Tony Hamilton; Phil Morris; Terry Markwell; Jane Badler; Bob Johnson
- Theme music composer: Lalo Schifrin
- Composers: Ron Jones, John E. Davis
- Country of origin: United States
- No. of seasons: 2
- No. of episodes: 35

Production
- Production locations: Village Roadshow Studios, Queensland, Australia; (Season 1); Melbourne, Victoria, Australia; (Season 2)
- Running time: 46–49 minutes
- Production companies: Jeffrey Hayes Productions; Paramount Network Television

Original release
- Network: ABC
- Release: October 23, 1988 – February 24, 1990

Related
- Mission: Impossible (1966–1973)

Mission: Impossible is an American television series that chronicles the missions of a team of secret American government agents known as the Impossible Missions Force (IMF). The show is a continuation of the 1966–1973 television series of the same name, and aired on ABC from October 23, 1988, to February 24, 1990. The only actor to return for the series as a regular cast member was Peter Graves who played Jim Phelps, although two other cast members from the original series (Greg Morris and Lynda Day George) returned as guest stars, and Bob Johnson continued to provide the voice of "The Tape" (in this series, "The Disc").

== Plot ==
The events of the series take place 15 years after the last season of the original Mission: Impossible television series. After his protégé and successor as leader of the top-secret Impossible Missions Force is killed, Jim Phelps is called out of retirement and asked to form a new IMF team and track down the assassin.

His team consists of:

- Nicholas Black, a professor of acting, actor, and disguise expert.
- Max Harte, a strongman who was also a weapons and undercover expert.
- Casey Randall, an interior designer turned undercover agent.
- Grant Collier, son of Barney Collier, the IMF's original technology expert, and a technical genius in his own right.

After finding the killer, Jim decides to stay on and keep the team together. Midway through season 1, Casey is killed during a mission (becoming the first ongoing IMF agent to be disavowed on screen), and Secret Service agent Shannon Reed succeeds her for the remainder of the series. With the exception of this cast change, Phelps's team remains constant throughout the series.

== Cast ==
=== Main cast ===
Character Name	Season(s)	Episodes(s)	Portrayed by	Known special abilities
Jim Phelps	1–2	1–35	Peter Graves	Leadership, disguise, role play, mimicry
Nicholas Black	1–2	1–35	Thaao Penghlis	Actor, makeup/disguise, visual effects, voice impersonation, mimicry
Max Harte	1–2	1–35	Tony Hamilton	Strength, acting, role play, marksmanship, logistics, driving, pilot
Grant Collier	1–2	1–35	Phil Morris	Electronics, computers, sabotage, engineer
Casey Randall	1	1–12	Terry Markwell	Designer, femme fatale, sharpshooter
Shannon Reed	1–2	12–35	Jane Badler	Ex-Secret Service Agent, femme fatale, disguise, mimicry, role play
Voice on Disc	1–2	1–35	Bob Johnson (voice only)	

=== Guest cast ===
The revived series had special appearances by a couple of 1960s–1970s IMF veterans, including Lynda Day George and Greg Morris as Barney Collier. (George's character's name Casey became her surname, and she was given the first name Lisa due to this series having an operative also called Casey.) The character played by Morris's real-life son, Phil Morris, is Grant Collier, Barney's son.

The appearances of Barney Collier and Lisa Casey established continuity with the original series, while the episodes "Spy" and "Reprisal" established that Jim Phelps continued to work after the original series ended.

== Production ==
=== Development ===
In 1988, the American fall television season was hampered by a writers' strike that prevented the commissioning of new scripts. Producers, anxious to provide new product for viewers but with the prospect of a lengthy strike, went into the vaults for previously written material. ABC decided to launch a new Mission: Impossible series, with a mostly new cast (except for Graves, who would return as Phelps), but using scripts from the original series, suitably updated. To save even more on production costs, the series was filmed in Australia; the first season at the new Village Roadshow Studios in Queensland, and the second season in Melbourne. Costs in 1988 were some 20 percent lower in Australia compared with Hollywood. The new Mission: Impossible was one of the first American commercial network programs to be filmed in Australia. The show's core cast included several Australian actors, and numerous Australians (along with Australian-based American and British actors) were also cast in guest roles.

According to Patrick White's book, The Complete Mission Impossible Dossier, the original plan was for the series to be an actual remake/reimaginging of the original series, with the new cast playing the same characters from the original series: Rollin Hand, Cinnamon Carter, et al. Just before filming began, White writes, the decision was made to rework the characters so that they were now original creations, albeit still patterned after the originals, with only Jim Phelps remaining unchanged, and with the Collier character becoming the son of the original to take advantage of the fact the actor cast in the role, Phil Morris, is the son of Greg Morris, the actor who played Barney Collier. One of the reworked scripts incorporated a guest appearance by the elder Morris as Barney Collier.

The strike eventually ended and the series was able to compose original storylines. Ultimately only a few episodes ended up being outright remakes of the original series, including the show's premiere episode.

=== Cancellation ===
Originally, the show had aired on Sundays, filling in for A Fine Romance, then delayed by the strike, and was moved to Saturday evenings starting with episode 9 of the first season. At the start of the second season, ABC moved the show to the Thursday 8:00 p.m. timeslot, which proved to be a disaster. Being forced to compete with NBC's The Cosby Show and A Different World, Mission: Impossible's ratings quickly declined. ABC responded by moving the show back to Saturday nights to replace the sitcoms Mr. Belvedere and Living Dolls, which faltered badly in their time slots. The move was not a success and the series was cancelled at the end of the second season.

== Episodes ==
Season	Episodes	Originally released	
Season	Episodes	First released	Last released
1	19	October 23, 1988	May 6, 1989
2	16	September 21, 1989	February 24, 1990

=== Season 1 (1988–89) ===
No. overall	No. in season	Title	Directed by	Written by	Original release date	Prod. code	U.S. viewers (millions)	Rating/share (households)
1	1	"The Killer"	Cliff Bole	Arthur Weiss	October 23, 1988	1	23.0	14.5/22
When an assassin (John de Lancie) kills his protégé and replacement as IMF team leader, Jim Phelps comes out of retirement in order to stop both the assassin and the man behind him, known only as "Scorpio". His team's job is complicated when it's discovered the killer makes his decisions at random. Remake of the first episode in season five of the original series.
2	2	"The System"	Cliff Bole	Robert Hamner	October 30, 1988	3	19.6	12.6/19
In order to get him to turn state's evidence against his Syndicate boss, the IMF makes a crooked casino owner (James Sloyan) believe his boss is setting him up to be eliminated. Remake of episode fifteen in season three of the original series.
3	3	"Holograms"	Kim Manners	Robert Brennan	November 6, 1988	4	17.3	11.0/16
In order to tempt the strongman leader of a Latin American country onto a US territorial island so that he can be extradited, the IMF uses a 15-year-old boy to pose as his long-lost son.
4	4	"The Condemned"	Cliff Bole	S : John Truman (Note: "John Truman" is a pseudonym for the original episode's writer, Laurence Heath, who had his name removed from the credits of the remake.); T : Ted Roberts & Michael Fisher	November 20, 1988	5	18.5	11.8/17
After Grant's father Barney Collier (Greg Morris, reprising his role from the original series) is framed for murder in Istanbul, the IMF must break him out of prison and determine why he was set up. Remake of episode nineteen in season two of the original series.
5	5	"The Legacy"	Kim Manners	Michael Lynn (Note: "Michael Lynn" is a pseudonym for William Read Woodfield, who had his name taken off the credits of the revived episode.) & Allan Balter	November 27, 1988	2	15.8	9.7/14
Nicholas poses as one of the four grandsons of Nazi officers who want to use a stash of Nazi gold hidden by their grandfathers at the end of WWII in order to finance a wave of terrorist activities in Europe. Remake of episode fifteen in season one of the original series.
6	6	"The Wall"	Colin Budds	David Phillips	December 11, 1988	6	20.9	12.7/19
In order to rescue the daughter of a West German negotiator, the team manipulates a crooked East German doctor who offers to smuggle people to West Berlin for an exorbitant fee but, in reality, delivers them into the hands of the Stasi.
7	7	"The Cattle King"	Mike Vejar	Ted Roberts	December 18, 1988	7	14.0	8.7/13
The IMF sets out to thwart an Australian cattle rancher and arms dealer who is offering to sell Stinger missiles to terrorists by making him think he has been cursed by an Aboriginal shaman. This episode is very similar to "Doomsday".
8	8	"The Pawn"	Brian Trenchard-Smith	Billy Marshall-Stoneking	January 15, 1989	8	14.9	8.8/13
When a Czechoslovak nuclear scientist and chess grand master wishes to defect to the west with his daughter, the IMF must get him out from under the watchful eye of his escort, a suspicious Soviet colonel.
9	9	"The Haunting"	Mike Vejar	Michael Fisher	January 28, 1989	9	14.0	9.2/16
The IMF team uses the supernatural interests of the domineering mother (Janis Paige) of a serial killer (Parker Stevenson) in order bring him down after he kills the princess of an oil-rich sultanate.
10	10	"The Lions"	Rob Stewart	S : James Crown; T : David Phillips	February 4, 1989	10	14.7	9.6/16
A royal usurper (James Shigeta) is out to kill the true heir to the throne of the Himalayan kingdom of Bajan-Du by replacing the pieces of a deadly puzzle that is part of the coronation ceremony with replicas that will ensure failure.
11	11	"The Greek"	Colin Budds	Ted Roberts	February 11, 1989	11	15.2	9.8/16
The IMF makes the heads of the organization of a Greek tycoon and relief medicine smuggler (Cesare Danova) believe he is double-crossing them.
12	12	"The Fortune"	Rod Hardy	Robert Brennan	February 18, 1989	12	16.6	10.5/18
While performing advanced recon for a mission to recover the money looted from the treasury of a Caribbean nation by its ousted dictator (Michael Pate) and his Eva Perón-like wife (Barbara Luna), Casey is captured and killed by the dictator's wife, the only time in either TV series that an IMF agent is killed and subsequently disavowed. The rest of the team, along with new team member Shannon Reed, must accomplish the mission while also obtaining proof of Casey's death. This is the final episode for Terry Markwell as Casey Randall and the first episode for Jane Badler as Shannon Reed.
13	13	"The Fixer"	Colin Budds	Walter Brough	February 25, 1989	13	13.8	9.0/16
A Washington journalist (Richard Romanus) has a sideline in blackmail and the team must stop him by turning his confidante and bodyguard against him. This is the first episode to feature Jane Badler in the opening credits.
14	14	"Spy"	Rob Stewart	Michael Fisher	March 18, 1989	14	14.6	9.6/17
The IMF must go to Africa to stop a rogue former MI6 agent from selling a cache of diamonds in order to finance the sale of chemical weapons. The mission is complicated when Jim Phelps is recognized by the enemy agent and he is shot.
15	15	"The Devils"	Arch Nicholson	Ted Roberts	March 25, 1989	15	12.9	8.7/16
The team investigates a member of the English gentry (John Stanton) who involves foreign and domestic officials in Satanic rituals and human sacrifice for blackmail purposes.
16	16	"The Plague"	Colin Budds	Rick Maier	April 8, 1989	16	12.3	8.1/15
A French terrorist (Maud Adams) has stolen a deadly bacteria that causes rapid organ deterioration in those infected by it. The IMF must convince her she has been infected herself in order to re-obtain it.
17	17	"Reprisal"	Rob Stewart	Walter Brough	April 15, 1989	17	12.0	8.2/15
When a psychotic ex-IMF scientist begins killing the old IMF team that Jim Phelps led which put him behind bars (and frames Jim Phelps for the murders), the new team must figure out how he is killing from his prison cell and try to save the remaining targeted agents. Lynda Day George reprises her role of Casey from the original series; the character was given the first name "Lisa" in order to avoid confusion with the character of Casey Randall.
18	18	"Submarine"	Colin Budds	Dale Duguid	April 29, 1989	18	12.2	8.2/16
The team must track down the purveyor (Mitchell Ryan) of a computer virus that destroys the systems of naval vessels and acquire the only antivirus from the creator. Written by series art director Dale Duguid. Despite the title, it is not a remake of the original series episode of the same name.
19	19	"Bayou"	Don Chaffey	Jeffrey M. Hayes	May 6, 1989	19	13.9	9.2/18
The team has to take down the head of a white slavery operation in Louisiana (Frank Thring) by using the voodoo beliefs of his trusted lieutenant (Paula Kelly) to drive a wedge between them.

=== Season 2 (1989–90) ===
No. overall	No. in season	Title	Directed by	Written by	Original release date	Prod. code	U.S. viewers (millions)	Rating/share (households)
20	1	"The Golden Serpent: Part 1"	Don Chaffey	T : Ted Roberts & Jeffrey M. Hayes; S/T : Michael Seims	September 21, 1989	20	12.8	8.6/14
In order to bring down the ruler of a small southeast Asian principality, who is also a member of an opium cartel, the IMF makes the prince believe his long-dead twin brother is still alive and out for revenge. Greg Morris guest stars as Barney Collier.
21	2	"The Golden Serpent: Part 2"	Don Chaffey	T : Ted Roberts & Jeffrey M. Hayes; S/T : Michael Seims	September 28, 1989	21	13.0	9.2/15
Conclusion. After making the leader of the cartel believe the prince had been stealing from him, Jim Phelps and Nicholas pose as rivals trying to take over the organization.
22	3	"The Princess"	Colin Budds	Ted Roberts	October 5, 1989	22	14.7	10.1/17
In order to save a European princess targeted for assassination by a member of her inner circle from the killer known only as "Coyote", the IMF poses as a film production crew making a film about the assassin.
23	4	"Command Performance"	Arch Nicholson	Robert Brennan	October 12, 1989	23	13.3	8.7/15
The IMF team poses as circus performers to rescue a priest who can bring down a corrupt Baltic defense minister and recover a hidden relic which contains state secrets. Similar to the original series episode "Old Man Out".
24	5	"Countdown"	Brian Trenchard-Smith	Chip Hayes	October 26, 1989	24	13.1	9.1/15
Grant must get close to a religious zealot while the team works to convince her that her co-conspirator has betrayed her by bringing her leader, the Holy One, into the blast zone of a nuclear bomb she has placed in a secret location.
25	6	"War Games"	Rod Hardy	Walter Brough	November 2, 1989	25	12.9	8.6/13
A power-hungry Eastern European general plans to turn war games on his country's border into the real thing. His objective is to conquer the bordering nation's oil fields and overthrow his own government; the team must use the general's fervent belief in astrology against him.
26	7	"Target Earth"	Colin Budds	Stephen Kandel	November 9, 1989	26	12.1	8.3/13
When the first private crewed space flight is hijacked by terrorists, with Shannon on board, the IMF has to take control of both the spacecraft and mission control before a retaliatory US missile strike levels the base – with the rest of the team hostage inside. Note: Stephen Kandel is the only writer other than Walter Brough ("The Fixer," "Reprisal" and "War Games") to contribute original scripts to both the original and revival series.
27	8	"The Fuehrer's Children"	Don Chaffey	Frank Abatemarco	November 16, 1989	27	12.7	8.8/14
A neo-Nazi leader (Albert Salmi) plans to unify the world's white supremacist groups and create a fourth Reich using kidnapped children that were brainwashed from an early age.
28	9	"Banshee"	Colin Budds	Ted Roberts	November 30, 1989	28	14.5	9.9/15
During The Troubles, the IMF uses the legend of the banshee to stop a small-town pub owner who blew up a bus full of old people in order to goose his side business of arms dealing.
29	10	"For Art's Sake"	Don Chaffey	John Whelpley	December 14, 1989	29	12.4	8.2/13
An important national painting, on loan to the United States, is stolen by an art thief and placed in a hidden gallery. The IMF have to recover the painting before an international incident occurs, with a little help from a computer-forged Degas. Alex Cord, the villain from Season 7's "Crack Up" from the original series, stars as the villain in this episode.
30	11	"Deadly Harvest"	Arch Nicholson	Jan Sardi	January 6, 1990	30	11.2	7.3/12
The IMF travels to the Middle Eastern nation of Orambaq to disrupt a terrorist plot to destroy the American wheat harvest that would introduce virus-laden seeds into the US supply.
31	12	"Cargo Cult"	Colin Budds	Dale Duguid	January 13, 1990	31	12.3	7.7/14
The IMF must stop evil miners from using the beliefs of a Pacific cargo cult to extract gold in a manner that is killing the islanders.
32	13	"The Assassin"	Arch Nicholson	Cliff Green	January 20, 1990	32	13.5	8.1/14
The team investigates a series of assassinations of government officials by their subordinates, who then kill themselves. This episode is a remake of season 6's "Mindbend".
33	14	"The Gunslinger"	Colin Budds	S : Dan Roberts; T : Ted Roberts	February 3, 1990	33	11.0	7.0/12
A wild west tourist attraction in Nevada being run by a power-broker ex-Congressman is a front for a secret operation that the IMF must uncover and put a stop to.
34	15	"Church Bells in Bogota"	Arch Nicholson	Frank Abatemarco	February 10, 1990	34	11.4	7.2/13
The plan to bring a brutal Colombian drug lord to the US to stand trial is complicated when Shannon, undercover as a singer, is in a plane crash and develops amnesia.
35	16	"The Sands of Seth"	Colin Budds	Jeffrey M. Hayes	February 24, 1990	35	11.9	7.7/13
A museum curator is killing Egyptian politicians to resurrect the ancient death cult of Seth and crown himself pharaoh.

== Formula ==
The episode structure from the original series was largely repeated. However, by the time of the revival series, the Impossible Missions Force (which was originally suggested to be an independent agency) was larger in scale, with references now made to IMF divisions and additional teams similar to the one run by Phelps. The series also had IMF agents using technology that nearly pushed the series into the realm of science fiction, such as one gadget that could record dreams.

=== Disc scene ===
Instead of retrieving a tape recorder and an envelope of photos, Phelps would converse briefly with an undercover contact who directed him to the location of a small black optical disc player with a thumbprint scanner built into its lid. After scanning the print, the device would open to reveal a video screen and a 12-button numeric keypad, on which Phelps would type in an access code. Doing so caused a panel to slide open, exposing both the disc and a pop-up insertion slot. Upon playing the disc, Phelps would see photos and video clips related to the mission and hear a voice describing it. As in the original, the voice followed its description of the mission and goals with "Your mission, Jim, should you choose/decide to accept it" or words to that effect; it would also warn that "As always, should you or any of your I.M. Force be caught or killed, the Secretary will disavow any knowledge of your actions. This disc will self-destruct in five seconds. Good luck, Jim." Phelps would then close the lid and walk away as smoke began to emit from inside the case to indicate the disc's self-destruction, at which point the camera would freeze and zoom up as the show's logo was revealed and theme song played prior to the apartment scene.

These briefings were read by voice actor Bob Johnson in the original series and the 1988 revival but the identity of the character was never revealed, nor was his face ever shown. Many episodes would show an establishing shot of either the San Francisco skyline or one of the city's famous landmarks before cutting to Phelps making his way to his contact to retrieve the disc player.

=== Apartment scene ===
The 1980s revival reinstated the "dossier scene" in the first episode when Phelps selected his new team. In keeping with the updated theme of the series, Phelps uses a computer system (hidden inside his coffee table) rather than folders of clippings and documents to make his decision (with Bob Johnson also providing the narration for the video clips of each IMF agent). Since he kept the same team in subsequent episodes no subsequent dossier scenes were made. Instead, subsequent episodes generally showed Phelps holding mission briefings with his team at his apartment, usually using his computer system to discuss with them some of the same information he got from the disc player.

=== Plan ===
In the 1980s revival, the mask-making process involved a digital camera and computer and was mostly automatic. Most episodes included a dramatic revelation near the end in which the team member (usually Nicholas Black) would remove the mask.

=== Improvisation ===
In contrast to the original series, the 1980s missions often departed from the team's original plan, requiring the team to think on their feet and use their equipment in ways that had not originally been intended.

=== Conclusion ===
In the 1980s revival, this format was altered with the addition of a tag scene showing the IMF team regrouping (often still in disguise) and walking away from the site of their concluded mission, often accompanied by a quip uttered by Jim Phelps. Phelps is first shown uttering said quip in the episode "The Fixer", which was also the first episode featuring Shannon Reed as a full member.

=== Breaking the formula ===
Several episodes break the formula. "The Fortune", an episode that aired midway through the first season, featured the death of Terry Markwell's character, Casey Randall. Casey became the first core IMF member to be killed off, and the discovery of her death by Phelps during a mission in progress leads to one IMF member, Max, openly questioning his ability to complete the mission, and Phelps reacting in anger when the culprit is captured. "The Fortune" ends with a tag scene showing, for the first time, an IMF agent being disavowed. "The Fortune" is also the only episode in Mission: Impossible history to be a "changeover" episode as it introduces Casey's successor, Shannon Reed (played by Jane Badler), who helps bring Casey's killer to justice.

== Broadcast history ==
Season	Time slot (ET)
1988–89	Sunday at 8:00 pm (Episodes 1–8); Saturday at 8:00 pm (Episodes 9–19)
1989–90	Thursday at 8:00 pm (1989); Saturday at 8:00 pm (1990)

== Home media ==
CBS DVD (distributed by Paramount) has released the entire series on DVD in region 1.

In region 2, Revelation Films released Mission: Impossible – The '88 TV Season on July 23, 2012, and The '89 TV Season on October 15, 2012.

DVD Name	Ep #	Release Dates	
DVD Name	Ep #	Region 1	Region 2
The '88 TV Season	19	November 29, 2011	July 23, 2012
The '89 TV Season	16	February 28, 2012	October 15, 2012
