= Mission: Impossible season 2 =

Mission: Impossible
- Season 2
- No. of episodes: 25

Release
- Original network: CBS
- Original release: September 10, 1967 – March 17, 1968

Season chronology
- ← Previous; Season 1 Next → Season 3

The second season of the original Mission: Impossible originally aired Sundays at 10:00–11:00 pm (EST) on CBS from September 10, 1967 to March 17, 1968.

== Cast ==
Character	Actor	Main	Recurring
Jim Phelps	Peter Graves	Entire season	
Rollin Hand	Martin Landau	Entire season	
Cinnamon Carter	Barbara Bain	Entire season (She did not appear in episode 19)	
Barney Collier	Greg Morris	Entire season (He did not appear in episode 14)	
Willy Armitage	Peter Lupus	Entire season (He did not appear in episodes 2, 8 and 24)	

== Episodes ==
No. overall	No. in season	Title	Directed by	Written by	Original release date	Prod. code
29	1	"The Widow"	Lee H. Katzin	Barney Slater	September 10, 1967	33
First episode to feature Peter Graves as Jim Phelps. The IMF capture a heroin distributor and Cinnamon goes undercover as his "widow" in order to shut down part of "the Syndicate."
30	2	"Trek"	Leonard J. Horn	Laurence Heath	September 17, 1967	29
The IMF team must recover some Incan gold artifacts, but their mission is further complicated when the one man who can lead them to the stolen artifacts goes blind. Mark Lenard co-stars. Willy did not appear in this episode.
31	3	"The Survivors"	Paul Stanley	William Read Woodfield & Allan Balter	September 24, 1967	28
The IMF team must rescue two top-secret government scientists and their wives who have been working on a revolutionary new weapon, Project 12. First episode made in production order with Peter Graves as Jim Phelps.
32	4	"The Bank"	Alf Kjellin	Brad Radnitz	October 1, 1967	30
The head of a bank in the East Zone (James Daly) murders would-be defectors after being entrusted with their money, and the IMF must permanently prevent him before he can use the embezzled money to launch a new Nazi movement.
33	5	"The Slave: Part 1"	Lee H. Katzin	William Read Woodfield & Allan Balter	October 8, 1967	32A
Slavery is still practiced in a Persian Gulf nation, but there is tension in the nation's leadership on the issue. IMF is tasked with stopping this trade, by exploiting this tension. The IMF's plan is to unleash a cloud of bats inside the prince's bedroom (a scene reminiscent of Alfred Hitchcock's The Birds) in order to kidnap the princess and sell her at the slave market.
34	6	"The Slave: Part 2"	Lee H. Katzin	William Read Woodfield & Allan Balter	October 15, 1967	32B
Continuation of the previous episode. Barbara Bain's character Cinnamon Carter is sold to a slave trader, and then switched with the kidnapped princess just before the auction. The princess is an English woman who has convinced her husband, the king's brother, that slavery is wrong. The IMF contrives to get the king's brother to the slave auction, where he discovers his own wife being sold at auction. The king's brother then demands an end to slave markets in his country.
35	7	"Operation Heart"	Leonard J. Horn	John O'Dea & Arthur Rowe	October 22, 1967	31
When an innocent American archaeologist becomes entangled in a plot to assassinate the president of a country (Pernell Roberts), the IMF must rescue the seriously ill American and prevent the president from being killed by his chief of security (Michael Strong).
36	8	"The Money Machine"	Paul Stanley	Richard M. Sakal	October 29, 1967	34
An African financier (Brock Peters) is printing counterfeit currency that could destroy his nation's economy. The IMF must put him out of business and recover the stolen printing plates he is using to make the counterfeits. Willy did not appear in this episode.
37	9	"The Seal"	Alexander Singer	William Read Woodfield & Allan Balter	November 5, 1967	35
A stolen jade statuette is sacred to a small Asian country, and in order to prevent an international incident the IMF must recover it from the private high-security collection of a wealthy but paranoid American defense contractor (Darren McGavin) by using the services of the newest member of the IMF Team--a specially trained cat named Rusty. Cat star Orangey guest stars as IMF agent cat Rusty.
38	10	"Sweet Charity"	Marc Daniels	Barney Slater	November 12, 1967	36
In order to recover millions of dollars (in the form of platinum bars) stolen from the needy by a married couple (Fritz Weaver, Hazel Court) and to put a stop their charity racket for good, the IMF team goes to the couple’s estate on the French/Italian border where a group of millionaires have been invited for the collection of $1 million supposedly to build a new hospital wing. The Wayne Manor set from the 1960s TV series Batman is featured in this episode and for the first time in the series. It will be featured again in the fourth season episode "The Numbers Game" (S04/E02).
39	11	"The Council: Part 1"	Paul Stanley	William Read Woodfield & Allan Balter	November 19, 1967	37A
By taking over honest businesses, a criminal enterprise headed by Frank Wayne (Paul Stevens) is corrupting the nation’s economy by depositing millions of dollars into Swiss bank accounts, causing an intolerable drain of U.S. gold reserves. In order to get the syndicate’s records, turn them over to the proper authorities, and put an end to the organization, Rollin poses as Wayne, and Jim poses as an ambitious prosecutor.
40	12	"The Council: Part 2"	Paul Stanley	William Read Woodfield & Allan Balter	November 26, 1967	37B
Continuation of the previous episode. This two-part story was released theatrically outside the US as Mission: Impossible vs. the Mob.
41	13	"The Astrologer"	Lee H. Katzin	James F. Griffith	December 3, 1967	39
Nikolai Kurzon the exiled leader of the Baltic state of Veyska has been kidnapped by the head of the secret police Colonel Stahl (Steve Ihnat). Kurzon possessed a microfilm containing the names of officials and citizens who support him which, if returned to the country, would result in their murder and kill their chance of liberation. In order to rescue him and ensure the microfilm does not return to the country. Cinnamon poses as an famous astrologer playing upon the astrology obsession the nation's leader has. At Paris Orly Airport, Barney and Rollin secretly board the government aircraft (the DC-6 Long Beach from Mercer Airlines) transporting the leader and perform an in-flight rescue operation through the cargo compartment of the aircraft.
42	14	"Echo of Yesterday"	Leonard J. Horn	Mann Rubin	December 10, 1967	38
The head of Europe’s munitions plant (Wilfrid Hyde-White) is planning to turn over complete control of his vast industrial empire to the leader of a resurging neo-Nazi group (Eric Braeden). In order to stop them, Jim poses as an American Nazi, and Cinnamon poses as a photographer resembling the industrial leader’s former wife to re-awaken old memories of her murder committed by Adolf Hitler. Barney did not appear in this episode.
43	15	"The Photographer"	Lee H. Katzin	William Read Woodfield & Allan Balter	December 17, 1967	40
The IMF must break the enemy's encryption code that is being utilized by way of a photographer (Anthony Zerbe) and smuggling to prevent a pneumonic plague to be released in the United States. Elite Magazine, the source of Cinnamon's dossier photo, aids the IMF in this case. This was the final episode produced under the Desilu banner.
44	16	"The Spy"	Paul Stanley	Barney Slater	January 7, 1968	41
A map of NATO's missile defense system must be duplicated in order to fool a female spy. This was the first episode produced for Paramount.
45	17	"A Game of Chess"	Alf Kjellin	Richard M. Sakal	January 14, 1968	42
A gold shipment, sent to fund an anti-communist resistance movement, has been seized by the country's government and the IMF must get it to its intended recipients, but an international chess champion and con artist is also after the gold.
46	18	"The Emerald"	Michael O'Herlihy	William Read Woodfield & Allan Balter	January 21, 1968	43
Microfilm detailing an enemy plot is affixed to an emerald in the possession of a notorious arms dealer; the IMF must obtain the microfilm and eliminate the enemy agent who has been sent to buy the gem.
47	19	"The Condemned"	Alf Kjellin	Laurence Heath	January 28, 1968	44
When a childhood friend of Phelps' is sentenced to death in Latin America, the IMF go "off-book" to save him. This episode has no tape scene or dossier scene, and Cinnamon Carter (Barbara Bain) does not appear, nor is she mentioned. This inspired the 1988 Australian-filmed series continuation as "The Condemned" (S01/E04), in that series' first reunion of the original and revival series characters.
48	20	"The Counterfeiter"	Lee H. Katzin	William Read Woodfield & Allan Balter	February 4, 1968	45
The IMF must arrange the arrest of the owner (Edmond O'Brien) of a chain of medical clinics who is distributing counterfeit pharmaceuticals.
49	21	"The Town"	Michael O'Herlihy	Sy Salkowitz	February 18, 1968	46
In an "off-book" mission, Phelps accidentally discovers that a small town is filled with enemy sleeper agents; he is drugged and declared paralyzed by a stroke, but Rollin smells a rat. Will Geer guest stars.
50	22	"The Killing"	Lee H. Katzin	William Read Woodfield & Allan Balter	February 25, 1968	47
Conventional law-enforcement methods cannot stop a criminal mastermind (Gerald S. O'Laughlin), but his superstitions may be his undoing.
51	23	"The Phoenix"	Robert Totten	S : Edward DeBlasio; S/T : John D.F. Black	March 3, 1968	48
A museum curator (Alf Kjellin) must be prevented from giving an experimental alloy to a foreign power.
52	24	"Trial by Fury"	Leonard J. Horn	Sy Salkowitz	March 10, 1968	49
The IMF must save a Latin American political prisoner who is falsely accused of being an informant by other prisoners while being held in isolation in his totalitarian country's prison camp. This episode was filmed at the Stalag 13 set which was also in use for Hogan's Heroes. Willy did not appear in this episode.
53	25	"Recovery"	Robert Totten	William Read Woodfield & Allan Balter	March 17, 1968	50
When U.S. bomber crashes behind the Iron Curtain, the IMF must recover its fail-safe before a brilliant U.S. defector (Bradford Dillman) can reveal its secrets to the communists. This episode has no dossier scene.
