= Call to Danger =

1973 American television film

- Diana Muldaur & Peter Graves in the CBS Tuesday Night Movie, Call to Danger
- Genre: Adventure
- Written by: Laurence Heath
- Directed by: Tom Gries
- Starring: Peter Graves; Diana Muldaur; Clu Gulager; Ina Balin; Tina Louise; William Jordan
- Theme music composer: Laurence Rosenthal
- Country of origin: United States
- Original language: English

Production
- Producer: Laurence Heath
- Production locations: Paramount Studios - 5555 Melrose Avenue, Hollywood, Los Angeles, California; Washington, D.C.
- Cinematography: Robert W. Browne
- Editors: John Loeffler; Chuck Freeman
- Running time: 75 min.
- Production company: Paramount Television

Original release
- Network: CBS
- Release: February 27, 1973

Call to Danger was broadcast as a New CBS Tuesday Night Movie television film on February 27, 1973. Initially ordered as a pilot, titled Deadly Target, the series was envisioned as a vehicle for Peter Graves should his current series, Mission: Impossible, not be renewed. Diana Muldaur was cast as the female lead. Parts of the movie were filmed on location in Washington, D.C.

== Plot ==
The bold kidnapping of a crime syndicate turncoat (Roy Jenson), while in the midst of giving testimony before a Federal investigating committee, calls for an equally bold move by Justice Department investigators Inspector Douglas Warfield (Peter Graves) and Carrie Donovan (Diana Muldaur). With the help of chief ally Emmitt Jergens (Clu Gulager), an expert beekeeper/archer/computer science wizard and private citizen, the team attempts to infiltrate the syndicate boss's hideaway—a heavily fortified and intricate farm enclave on the west coast. Even with additional support from a gangsters fashion-model gal pal (Tina Louise) and a Justice Dept. cohort (John Anderson), Douglas and Carrie cannot ignore the increasing and likely deadly call to danger.

== Cast ==
- Peter Graves as Inspector Douglas Warfield
- Diana Muldaur as Inspector Carrie Donovan
- Stephen McNally as Joe Barker
- John Anderson as Edward McClure
- Tina Louise as April Tierney
- Clu Gulager as Emmitt Jergens
- William Jordan as Tony Boyd
- Michael Ansara as Frank Mulvey
- Roy Jenson as Dave Falk
- Victor Campos as Danny
- Ina Balin as Marla Hayes
- Paul Mantee as Simmy Adams

== Background ==
Call to Danger was originally a television pilot in 1961 starring Larry Blyden that was shown on General Electric Theater. In 1966 Peter Graves made another television pilot with the same title. The series wasn't picked up but Graves replaced Steven Hill on the Mission Impossible television series.
