= Dana Lambert =

Dana Lambert may refer to:

- Dana Lambert (Survivor), a contestant of Survivor: Philippines
- Dana Lambert (Mission: Impossible), a character of the original Mission: Impossible television series, portrayed by Lesley Ann Warren
