= Peter Graves =

American actor (1926–2010)

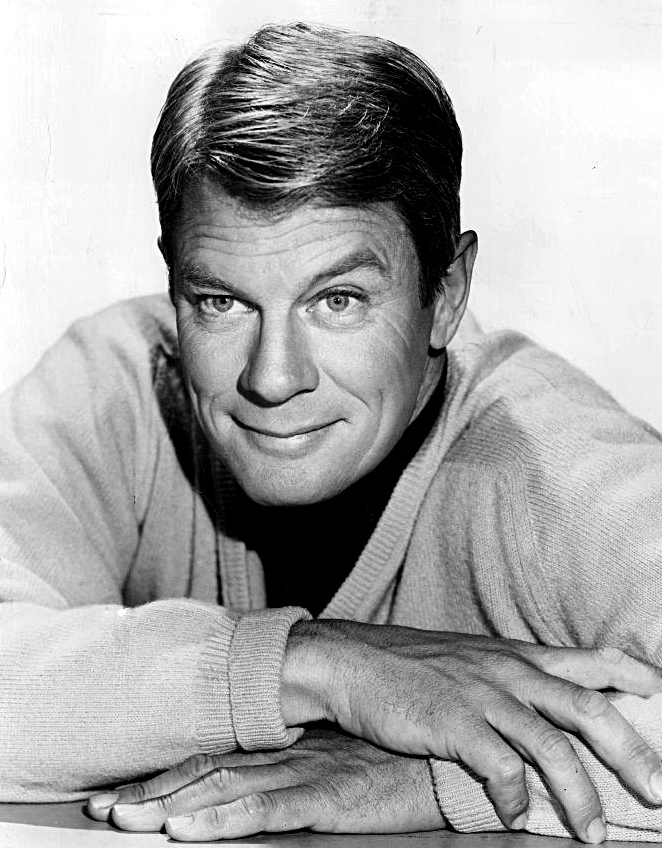
- Graves in 1967
- Born: Peter Duesler Aurness; March 18, 1926; Minneapolis, Minnesota, U.S.
- Died: March 14, 2010 (aged 83); Los Angeles, California, U.S.
- Education: University of Minnesota
- Occupation: Actor
- Years active: 1951–2010
- Spouse: Joan Endress (m. 1950)
- Children: 3
- Relatives: James Arness (brother)
- Military career
- Allegiance: United States
- Branch: United States Army Air Forces
- Service years: 1944–1945
- Rank: Corporal
- Conflicts: World War II
- Awards: American Campaign Medal; World War II Victory Medal

Peter Graves (born Peter Duesler Aurness; March 18, 1926 – March 14, 2010) was an American actor who portrayed Jim Phelps in the television series Mission: Impossible from 1967 to 1973 and in its revival from 1988 to 1990. His elder brother was actor James Arness. Graves also played airline pilot Captain Clarence Oveur in the 1980 comedy film Airplane! and its 1982 sequel Airplane II: The Sequel.

== Early life and education ==
Peter Graves was born Peter Duesler Aurness on March 18, 1926, in Minneapolis, Minnesota, the younger son of Rolf Cirkler Aurness (1894–1982), a businessman, and his wife, Ruth (née Duesler, died 1986), a journalist.

Graves's ancestry was Norwegian, German, and English. He used the stage name Graves, a maternal family name, to honor his mother's family, and also so as to not be confused with the stage name of his elder brother James Arness, star of the television series Gunsmoke.

Graves graduated from Southwest High School in 1944. He was a two-time Minnesota state track champion in the 120 yard high hurdles at Southwest. He served in the United States Army Air Forces during World War II from 1944 to 1945, reaching the rank of corporal, and was awarded the American Campaign Medal and the World War II Victory Medal. After demobilization, Graves enrolled at the University of Minnesota on the G.I. Bill, and was a member of Phi Kappa Psi fraternity.

== Career ==
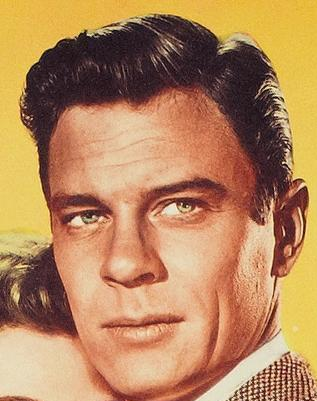
Graves on a lobby card for the 1957 film Beginning of the End

Graves appeared in more than 70 films, television shows, and television movies during his career. He was featured in a key role in the 1953 World War II film, Stalag 17. In 1955, Graves joined the NBC television series Fury, as the rancher and adoptive single father, Jim Newton.

From 1960 to 1961, Graves starred as Christopher Cobb in 34 episodes of the British/Australian TV series Whiplash. In the storyline, Cobb is an American who arrives in Australia in the 1850s to establish the country's first stagecoach line, using a bullwhip rather than a gun to fight the crooks he encounters. The series also starred Anthony Wickert. Graves also starred in the British ITC series Court Martial, playing U.S. Army lawyer Major Frank Whittaker, as well as guest roles in such series as Alfred Hitchcock Presents, Cimarron City, Route 66, and The Invaders (episode "Moonshot").

In 1967, Graves was recruited by Desilu Studios to replace Steven Hill as the lead actor on Mission: Impossible. Graves portrayed the iconic character of Jim Phelps, the sometimes-gruff director of the Impossible Missions Force, for the six following seasons of the series. After the series ended in 1973, Graves played a cameo-type support role in the feature film Sidecar Racers in Australia which was released in 1975. Graves also made a guest appearance in the teen soap opera Class of 74 in mid-1974, playing himself.

Graves was cast as Palmer Kirby in the 1983 ABC miniseries The Winds of War. He played opposite Robert Mitchum, Jan Michael Vincent, Deborah Winters and Ali MacGraw in what became in 1983 the second-most watched miniseries of all time (after Roots). He reprised the role for the 1988 sequel miniseries, War and Remembrance. During this time, he became the host of PBS's Discover: The World of Science.

After playing mainly serious roles in the 1970s, he appeared as Captain Clarence Oveur in the early 1980s comedies Airplane! and Airplane II: The Sequel.

In 1988, a Hollywood writers' strike resulted in a new Mission: Impossible series being commissioned. Graves was the only cast member from the original series to return as a regular, reprising his role as Jim Phelps, though others (most notably Greg Morris, whose son Phil was a regular in this version) made guest appearances. The series was filmed in Australia, and Graves made his third journey there for acting work. The new version of Mission: Impossible lasted for two seasons, ending in 1990. Bookending his work on Mission: Impossible, Graves starred in two pilot films, both called Call to Danger, which were attempts to create a Mission: Impossible–style series. In the first of these (1968), Graves played a government agent (the Bureau of National Resources) who recruited civilians with special talents for secret missions. In the second Call to Danger, he portrayed an investigator for the Justice Department.

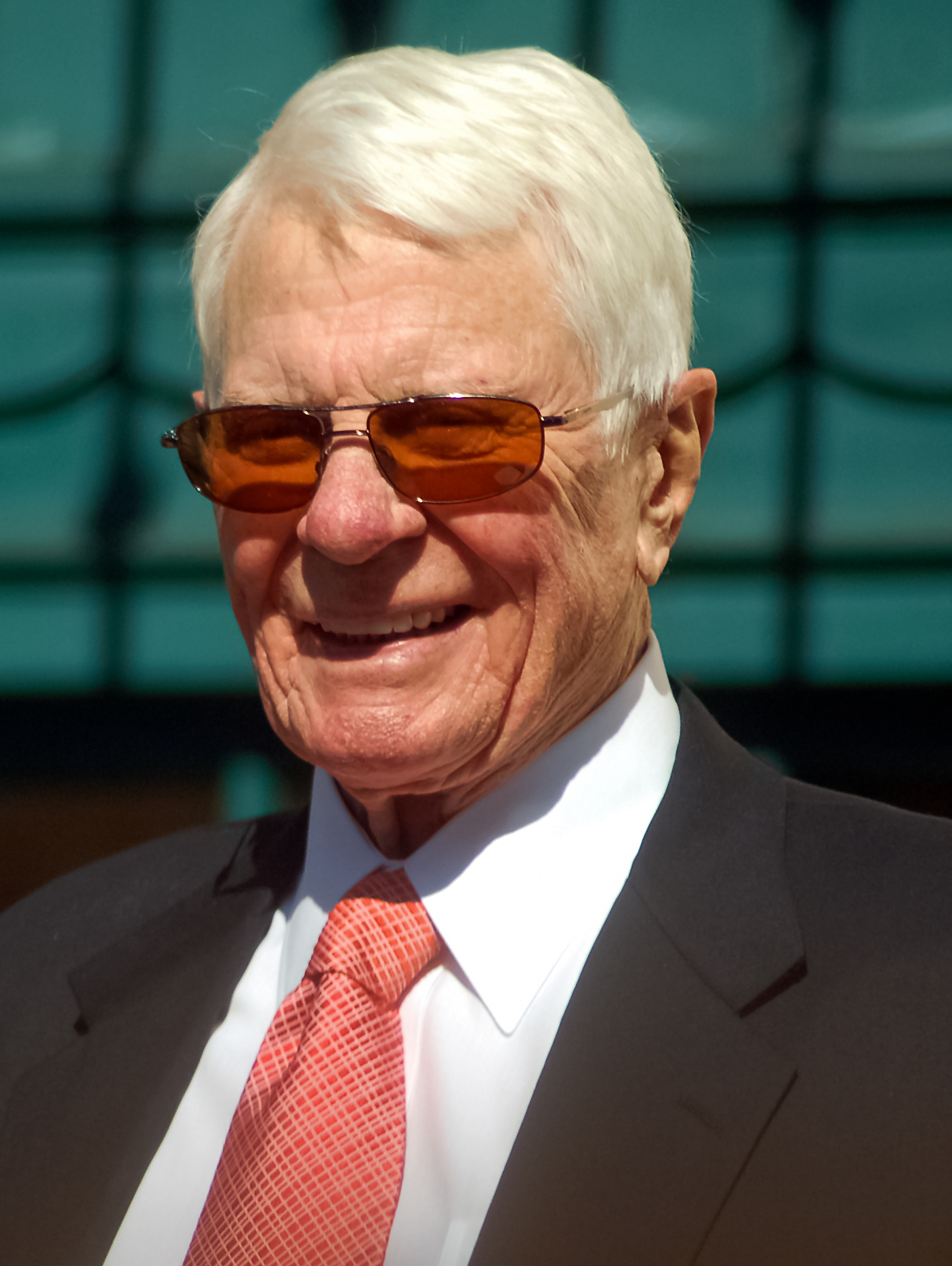
Graves attending a ceremony to receive a star on the Hollywood Walk of Fame in October 2009

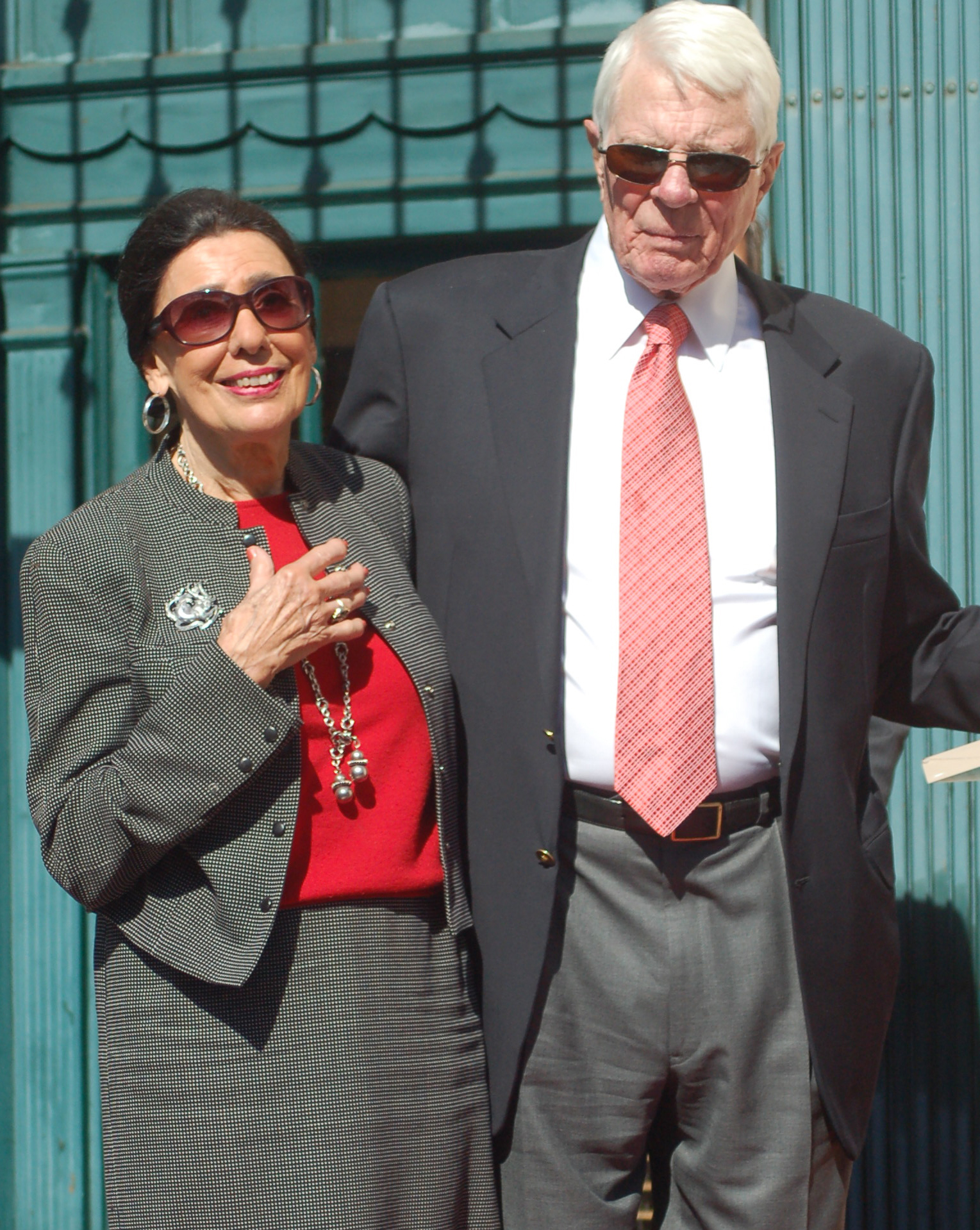
Graves with wife Joan Endress in October 2009

The 1960s version of the pilot, according to Patrick White in The Complete Mission: Impossible Dossier (which White reports was actually the second such pilot, but Graves was not involved in the first), is credited with winning Graves the role of Phelps; after Mission: Impossible ended in 1973, Graves filmed a third version of the pilot (this one structured as a made-for-TV movie), but it did not sell as a series. The concept was later used in the brief 1980s adventure series Masquerade.

During the 1990s, he hosted and narrated the documentary series Biography on A&E. He also acted in a number of films featured on Mystery Science Theater 3000, which subsequently featured running jokes about Graves' Biography work and presumed sibling rivalry with Arness. The films that have been featured on Mystery Science Theater 3000 include SST: Death Flight, It Conquered the World, Beginning of the End, and Parts: The Clonus Horror. The film Killers from Space was featured in The Film Crew, Michael J. Nelson's follow-up to MST3K. Graves himself parodied his Biography work in the film Men in Black II, hosting an exposé television show. He also played Colonel John Camden in the television series 7th Heaven.

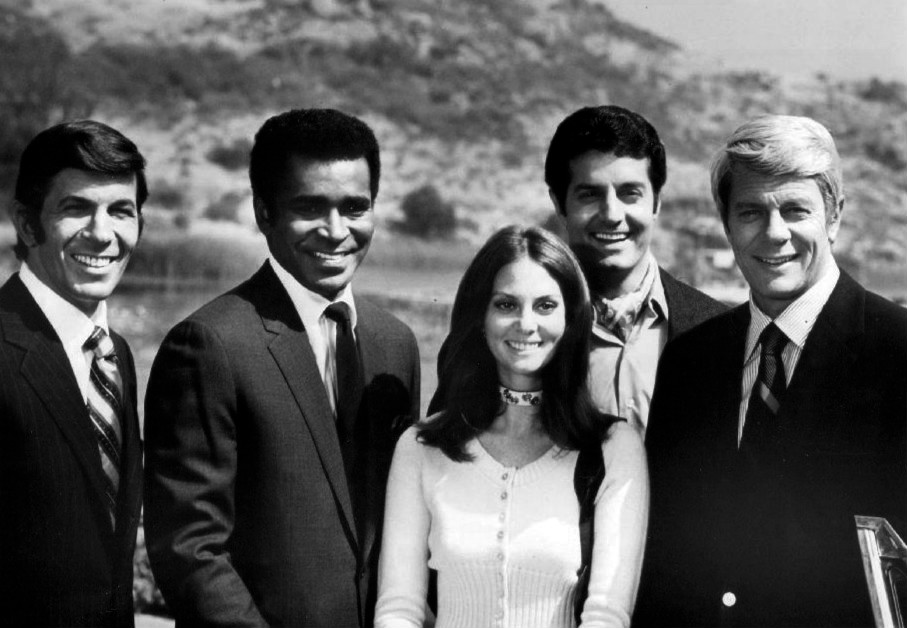
Graves with Mission: Impossible cast in 1970

Graves refused to reprise the role of Jim Phelps (played by Jon Voight) in the first 1996 theatrical film of Mission: Impossible, after the character was revealed to be a traitor and the villain of the film. In the film, Phelps murders three fellow IMF agents, and is killed in a helicopter crash at the end, a decision that disappointed Graves and fellow cast members, and upset many fans of the original series.

On October 30, 2009, Graves was honoured with a star on the Hollywood Walk of Fame at 6667 Hollywood Blvd.

AirTran Airways featured Graves in a series of web-only "Internetiquette" videos in 2009 in which Graves appeared in a pilot's uniform and references classic Airplane! lines. The videos were part of an AirTran Airways campaign to promote their in-flight wireless internet access.

In the summer of 2009, Graves signed on as a spokesman for reverse mortgage lender American Advisors Group. Graves' final project was narrating the computer game epic Darkstar: The Interactive Movie, released November 5, 2010.

== Personal life ==
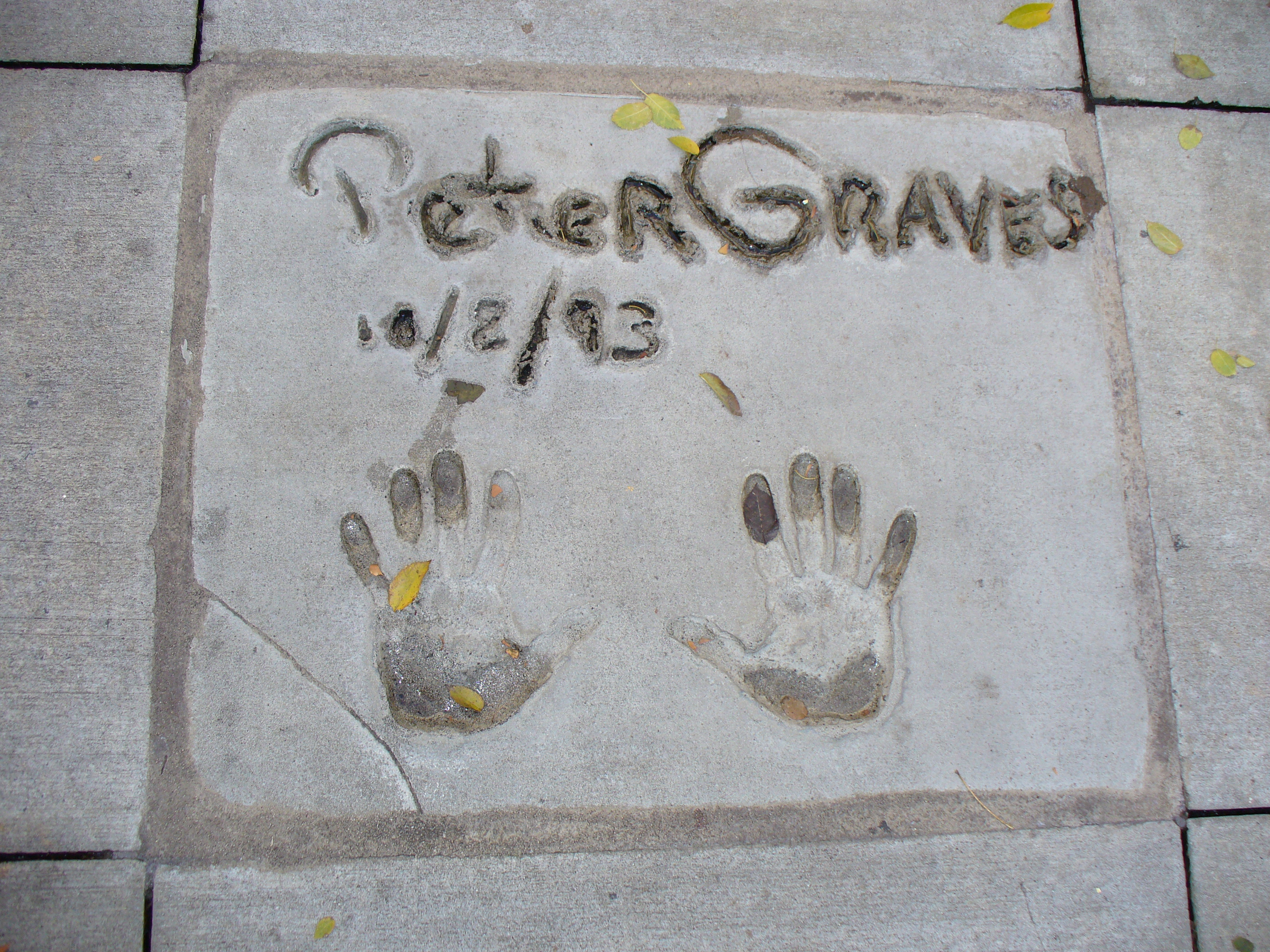
Handprints of Peter Graves in front of Hollywood Hills Amphitheater at the Disney's Hollywood Studios theme park

Graves was a devout Methodist of immigrant Norwegian paternal, and German maternal descent. He was married to Joan Endress Graves (1929-2011) for 60 years from 1950 until his death.

On March 6, 1984, Graves was hospitalized at Tahoe Forest Hospital for a fractured jaw among other injuries sustained from a fall on an icy Lake Tahoe road the previous weekend. He received 100 stitches to his lower lip during his stay.

Graves and his wife Joan had three daughters.

Graves helped organize a Los Angeles city ban on gas-powered leaf blowers.

A Republican, he was supportive of Ronald Reagan, Gerald Ford, and Richard Nixon.

== Death ==
On March 14, 2010, four days before his 84th birthday, after returning from brunch with his family, Graves suffered a heart attack outside his Los Angeles home. His daughter attempted cardiopulmonary resuscitation, but he was later pronounced dead.

== Awards ==
Graves was awarded a Golden Globe Award in 1971 for his role as Jim Phelps in the series Mission: Impossible. In 1972, he received the Golden Plate Award of the American Academy of Achievement. He also received nominations for an Emmy Award and Golden Globe awards in other seasons of that show. Graves also won a Primetime Emmy Award for outstanding informational series in 1997 as host of Biography.

== Filmography ==
=== Film ===
Year	Title	Role	Notes
1951	Rogue River	Pete Dandridge	
1951	Up Front	Military Policeman	Uncredited
1951	Angels in the Outfield	Radio Announcer	Uncredited
1951	Fort Defiance	Ned Tallon	
1952	The Congregation		Produced by the Protestant Film Commission.
1952	Red Planet Mars	Chris Cronyn	
1953	Stalag 17	Sgt. Frank Price	
1953	War Paint	Trooper Tolson	
1953	East of Sumatra	Cowboy	
1953	Beneath the 12-Mile Reef	Arnold Dix	
1954	Killers from Space	Doug Paul Martin	
1954	The Yellow Tomahawk	Walt Sawyer	
1954	The Raid	Capt. Frank Dwyer	
1954	A Man of Many Ideas	John Wanamaker	TV movie
1954	Black Tuesday	Peter Manning	
1955	The Long Gray Line	Cpl. Rudolph Heinz	
1955	The Man Who Tore Down the Wall	James Ewing	TV movie
1955	Robbers' Roost	Heesman	
1955	Wichita	Morgan Earp	
1955	The Night of the Hunter	Ben Harper	
1955	The Naked Street	Joe McFarland	
1955	Fort Yuma	Lt. Ben Keegan	
1955	The Court-Martial of Billy Mitchell	Capt. Bob Elliott	
1956	It Conquered the World	Paul Nelson	
1956	Hold Back the Night	Lt. Lee Couzens	
1956	Canyon River	Bob Andrews	
1957	Bayou	Martin Davis	
1957	Beginning of the End	Ed Wainwright	
1957	Death in Small Doses	Agent / Tom Kaylor	
1958	Wolf Larsen	Van Weyden	
1959	A Stranger in My Arms	Donald Ashton Beasley	
1961	Las Vegas Beat	Bill Ballin	TV movie
1964	Mr. Kingston		TV movie
1965	A Rage to Live	Jack Hollister	
1965	Attack of the Eye Creatures	Narrator of USAF Briefing Film	TV movie, Uncredited
1966	Texas Across the River	Capt. Stimpson	
1967	Valley of Mystery	Ben Barstow	TV movie
1967	The Ballad of Josie	Jason Meredith	
1968	Sergeant Ryker	Maj. Whitaker	Uses archive footage. The film was first shown as a two-part episode of NBC's Kraft Suspense Theatre, which spawned the series Court Martial. It was then recut and shown in cinemas
1968	Call to Danger	Jim Kingsley	TV movie
1969	The Five Man Army	Dutchman	
1969	Mission: Impossible vs. the Mob	Jim Phelps	Compilation of both parts of the two-part Mission: Impossible episode "The Council" re-edited and released to European theaters
1973	Call to Danger	Doug Warfield	TV movie
1973	The President's Plane Is Missing	Mark Jones	TV movie
1974	Scream of the Wolf	John Wetherby	TV movie
1974	The Underground Man	Lew Archer	TV movie
1974	Where Have All The People Gone?	Steven Anders	TV movie
1975	Sidecar Racers	Carson	
1975	Dead Man on the Run	Jim Gideon	TV movie
1976	The Mysterious Monsters	Himself	Documentary narrator
1977	SST: Death Flight	Paul Whitley	TV movie
1977	High Seas Hijack	Elliott Rhoades	English Version
1978	The Gift of the Magi	O. Henry	TV movie
1979	Missile X: The Neutron Bomb Incident	Alec Franklin	Also known as The Tehran Incident and Cruise Missile
1979	Spree	Kandaris	Also known as Survival Run
1979	The Rebels	George Washington	
1979	Parts: The Clonus Horror	Jeff Knight	
1979	Death Car on the Freeway	Lieutenant Haller	TV movie
1980	The Memory of Eva Ryker	Mike Rogers	
1980	Airplane!	Captain Clarence Oveur	
1981	300 Miles for Stephanie	Captain McIntyre	TV movie
1981	Best of Friends	Nick Adams	TV movie
1981	The Guns and the Fury	Mark Janser	
1982	Savannah Smiles	Harland Dobbs	
1982	Airplane II: The Sequel	Captain Clarence Oveur	
1984	Aces Go Places 3	Tom Collins	Cameo role in a Hong Kong movie
1987	Number One with a Bullet	Capt. Ferris	
1987	If It's Tuesday, It Still Must Be Belgium	Mr. Wainwright	TV movie
1993	Addams Family Values	Host	
1999	House on Haunted Hill	Himself	
2001	These Old Broads	Bill	TV movie
2002	Men in Black II	Himself	
2003	Looney Tunes: Back in Action	Host of Civil Defense Film	Uncredited
2003	With You in Spirit	Hal Whitman	TV movie
2010	Jack's Family Adventure	Uncle George Vickery	TV movie

=== Partial television credits ===
Year	Title	Role	Notes
1955–1960	Fury	Newton / Cyrus	
1959–1960	Whiplash	Christopher Cobb	
1963	The Alfred Hitchcock Hour	Mark Needham	Season 1 Episode 21: "I'll Be Judge - I'll Be Jury"
1964	The Virginian	Eastern Financier	
1965-1966	Court Martial	Major Frank Whittaker	
1966	Branded	Senator Keith Ashley	
1966	Daniel Boone	Logan Harris	Episode "Run A Crooked Mile"
1967	The F.B.I.	Manning Fryes	Episode "Rope of Gold"
1967	The Invaders	Gavin Lewis	1 episode
1967–1973	Mission: Impossible	Jim Phelps	Main role (Seasons 2-7)
1978	The Love Boat	Reverend Gerald Whitney	"Man of the Cloth" S2 E9
1979	Buck Rogers in the 25th Century	Major Noah Cooper	Episode "Return of the Fighting 69th"
1983	The Winds of War	Palmer 'Fred' Kirby	Miniseries
1984	Hammer House of Mystery and Suspense	John Bray	Episode "Tennis Court"
1984	Murder, She Wrote	Edmund Gerard	Episode "Lovers and Other Killers"
1988-1990	Mission: Impossible	Jim Phelps	Revival of the original series
1988	War and Remembrance	Palmer Kirby	
1991	The Golden Girls	Jerry Kennedy	
1995	Burke's Law	General Alexander Prescott	Episode "Who Killed the Toy Maker?"
1996–2007	7th Heaven	John 'The Colonel' Camden	
2005	House	Myron	"Love Hurts" S1 E20
2006	Cold Case	Anton Bikker	"The Hen House" S3 E21
2007	American Dad!	Mr. Pibb	
2007	WordGirl	Mr. Callahan	Voice; Episode: "Chuck the Nice Pencil-Selling Guy"

=== Video games ===
Year	Title	Role	Notes
2009	Leisure Suit Larry: Box Office Bust	Clark Tasslemuff	
2010	Darkstar: The Interactive Movie	Narrator	Posthumous release
