= List of Mission: Impossible (TV series) characters =

This is a list of recurring fictional characters in the Mission: Impossible television series (1966–1973 and 1988–1990).

== Overview ==
Character name	Season(s)	Dates	Portrayed by	Known special abilities
Dan Briggs	1	September 17, 1966– April 22, 1967	Steven Hill	Organization, leadership, role play, languages, hand-to-hand combat, voice mimicry, disguises
Rollin Hand	1–3	September 17, 1966– April 20, 1969	Martin Landau	Role play, languages, voice mimicry, disguises, sleight of hand, handwriting forgeries, ladies' man, hypnosis, fine mechanical skills such as watch repair and freehand key making, card sharp
Cinnamon Carter	1–3	September 17, 1966– April 20, 1969	Barbara Bain	Role play, languages, femme fatale, memory skills, astrology
Barney Collier	1–7 and some 1988–1990 episodes	September 17, 1966– September 8, 1973	Greg Morris	Engineering, role play, languages, building infrastructure, hand-to-hand combat, film editing, skydiving, helicopter pilot, scuba diving, voice mimicry, singing
Willy Armitage	1–7	September 17, 1966– September 8, 1973	Peter Lupus	Physical strength, role play, languages, hand-to-hand combat, marksmanship, custom construction, logistics, driving, procurement, scuba diving, card sharp, key making, long-distance swimming, motorcycling
The Voice on Tape	1–7 and 1988–1990	September 17, 1966– September 8, 1973	Bob Johnson	
Jim Phelps	2–7 and 1988–1990	September 10, 1967– September 8, 1973	Peter Graves	Organization, leadership, role play, languages, hand-to-hand combat, disguises, voice mimicry, scuba diving
The Great Paris	4–5	September 28, 1969– March 17, 1971	Leonard Nimoy	Role play, languages, voice mimicry, disguises, sleight of hand, ladies' man, hypnosis, card sharp
The Hartford and Globe Repertory Companies	4	October 5, 1969– March 8, 1970	Multiple uncredited actors	Basic role play, rapid large-scale custom construction
Tracey	4	October 5, 1969– January 18, 1970	Lee Meriwether	Role play
Dana Lambert	5	September 19, 1970– March 17, 1971	Lesley Ann Warren	Role play, femme fatale
Dr. Douglas Robert (Lang)	5–6	October 3, 1970– September 25, 1971	Sam Elliott	Medical knowledge and skills, role play, skydiving, helicopter pilot
Lisa Casey	6–7 and one episode from 1988 to 1990	September 18, 1971– March 30, 1973	Lynda Day George	Role play, femme fatale, disguises, voice mimicry, pickpocketing, stunt motorcycling
Mimi Davis	7	September 16, 1972– November 18, 1972	Barbara Anderson	Role play
Nicholas Black	1988–1990	October 23, 1988– February 24, 1990	Thaao Penghlis	Role play, Actor, makeup/disguise, visual effects, voice impersonation, mimicry
Casey Randall	1988–1989	October 23, 1988– February 18, 1989	Terry Markwell	Role play, Actor, makeup/disguise, voice impersonation, Designer, femme fatale, sharpshooter
Max Harte	1988–1990	October 23, 1988– February 24, 1990	Tony Hamilton	Strength, acting, role play, marksmanship, logistics, driving, pilot
Grant Collier	1988–1990	October 23, 1988– February 24, 1990	Phil Morris	Electronics, computers, sabotage, engineer
Shannon Reed	1989–1990	February 18, 1989– February 24, 1990	Jane Badler	Secret Service Agent, femme fatale, disguise, mimicry, role play

The cast changed considerably episode-by-episode throughout the program's seven-year run, so not all of the characters listed above took part in every mission that season. Many missions used one-time agents who were brought in as guest stars. Often, these agents were brought in for a specific skill, such as a pathologist, a psychic medium, or a contortionist.

== Introduced in season one ==
=== Dan Briggs ===
Daniel "Dan" Briggs’s main role in the team was as a Team Leader; he received the instructions from the 'Voice on Tape', and selected and coordinated the best people for the mission at hand. The team frequently consisted of Cinnamon Carter, Willy Armitage, Barney Collier, and Rollin Hand, although Briggs did not always use all of these team members and often also used other agents. He briefed the team, then if needed, handed out extra disguises or devices. Though Briggs played a significant role in many of the first-season missions, he was not an active participant in seven of the 27 missions he co-ordinated; after the mission briefings for these particular missions, Briggs did not join the team in the actual execution of the plan, evidently confident that his hand-picked team would succeed without his direct involvement.

As was the case with most characters in the series, Briggs's background and personal life were never explored in detail. The first mission of the series indicated that he had not worked with the Impossible Missions Force (IMF) for some time prior to that mission. (The 'Voice on Tape' ended the first mission's instructions with the statement, "I hope it's welcome back, Dan. It's been a while.") Another mission, "Old Man Out", revealed that he had once romanced an IMF agent played by Mary Ann Mobley. The only other insight into Briggs's personal life was his one off-book mission, "The Ransom", where the daughter of a personal friend of Briggs', a school teacher, is kidnapped to force Briggs to deliver a mob informant from police custody before he can testify before the grand jury.

Briggs was depicted at times as a cold, calculating character, quite willing to kill to complete a mission. Notably, he was the only member of the IMF shown personally killing a nontarget in anything other than self-defense, when he ambushed and killed a sentry to get through a checkpoint in "The Carriers". At other times, he exhibited a fatherlike attitude towards his agents, and was frequently seen smiling encouragement and patting shoulders as missions progressed. Several episodes, such as "Shock", revealed that Briggs had acting, voice mimicry, and disguise abilities similar to those of one of his agents, Rollin Hand.

At the start of the second season, James Phelps took over as lead of the IMF team, and no on-air explanation was offered for Briggs's disappearance. The real-life reason was that actor Steven Hill's Orthodox Jewish religious beliefs often conflicted with the shooting schedule, making it difficult for the production crew to meet deadlines. By mutual consent, his contract was not renewed for season two.

=== Rollin Hand ===
Rollin Hand’s role as an IMF agent was that of an actor and disguise expert. In a theatrical brochure that headed his dossier, he was described as a quick-change artist and billed as "The Man of a Million Faces." As such, he had formidable skills in mimicry and voice imitation (introduced in the second season), as well as a mastery of make-up. He was also an expert at sleight of hand and pickpocketing, which came into play in several missions where he would pick pockets or hide things on someone else's person without their knowledge. His language and cultural skills were formidable. He regularly passed himself off as a citizen of various Latin American and Eastern European countries, and no one ever questioned his authenticity. He also successfully impersonated well-known public figures, such as the dictator of a fictitious Latin American country, rumored Nazi fugitive Martin Bormann and Adolf Hitler. On at least two missions, he even successfully impersonated a left-handed person, doing all gestures and reflexive actions left-handed when Rollin himself was right-handed. He successfully falsified a wide variety of maladies in the course of missions to dupe targets, including seizures and drug addiction.

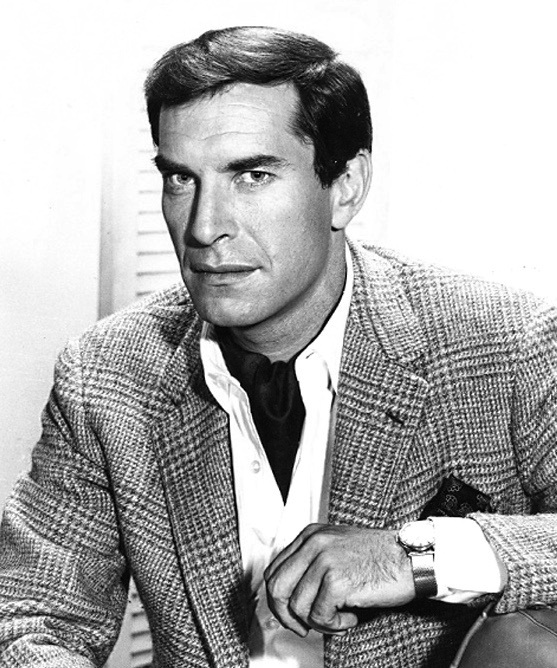
Landau as Rollin Hand

His abilities as a "ladies' man" were instrumental to the success of a number of missions. On one occasion, his role led to him having romantic feelings for a target who was killed at the end of the mission. In several early episodes, a romantic attachment to Cinnamon Carter was hinted at, if never explicit. While he probably had the least expertise in hand-to-hand combat of the original men on the IMF team, he was regularly called upon to defend himself in it, and usually came out on top. He was skilled with handguns and capable of killing when necessary. Rollin also has displayed incredible endurance several times, as shown by being put under physical torture frequently. He was willing to do solo missions as well as help with personal off book missions for the IMF leader.

The character of Rollin Hand was created specifically for actor Martin Landau, and indeed, as Patrick J. White's book The Complete 'Mission: Impossible' Dossier pointed out, he was almost named "Martin Land". To achieve many of Rollin's acts of mimicry, several of the characters he imitated were either dubbed by Landau or played by him in a double role under heavy make-up. This technique is used prominently in the first episode of the series, where Landau plays a Castro-like dictator of a small island nation whom Rollin must impersonate during a national broadcast.

=== Cinnamon Carter ===
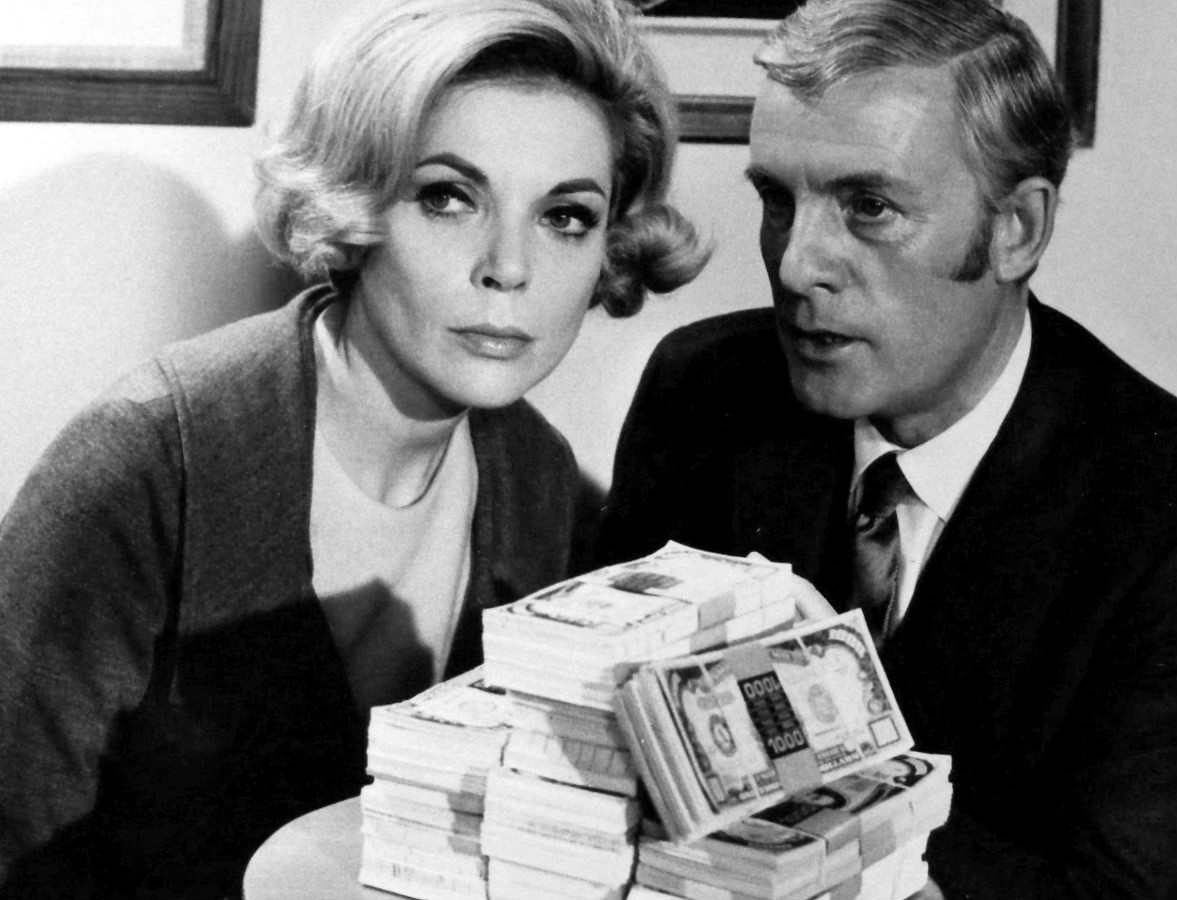
Barbara Bain as Cinnamon

Cinnamon Carter’s role as an IMF agent was that of "femme fatale" and "woman in distress". In her IMF dossier, she was noted as being a successful model, and the dossier scenes during her three seasons on the show showed at least three different magazine covers on which she was featured. How a famous international cover model failed to be recognized as such during a mission was never explained. Carter was often used to play on the vanities of powerful men to get them to lower their defenses. Frequently, she played the role of a beautiful American woman on the make to draw the subject in. On occasion, she played a woman in distress to distract someone. Carter rarely adopted elaborate disguises, as did practically everyone else on the program, because Barbara Bain, the actress playing her, suffered from claustrophobia, and could not abide being hemmed in by heavy makeup. In a nod to Bain's condition, Carter, too, was shown to be claustrophobic. In "The Heir Apparent", she is made up as an aging princess, heir to a nation, while in "The Bunker", she is masked as the objective scientist's wife. In episodes where someone was needed to get into tight spaces, another female agent was brought in, but in "The Slave", Cinnamon, in spite of her claustrophobia, is seen being placed into and later coming out of the false bottom of a food carriage as part of the IMF plan. Cinnamon's claustrophobia was used against her in a devastating way in the third-season mission, "The Exchange", when an enemy intelligence service discovers her phobia after capturing her and uses it in an attempt to break her. While Cinnamon was being interrogated, she demonstrated that she had been trained in counter-interrogation techniques, resisting all attempts to get her to give up the team.

While Carter was rarely called upon to defend herself in hand-to-hand combat, she was shown to have at least the basic skills to disable a single adversary as evidenced in missions such as "Odds On Evil" and "The Town", and she was confident handling a gun. Like Rollin Hand, her assignments did, on rare occasions, lead to her falling for her target.

She was shown to have feelings for Rollin Hand in a conversation she had with "Crystal", a woman on one mission who had feelings for Dan Briggs, when Cinnamon brought up that Crystal was worried about Dan, who was with Rollin on a risky mission. Crystal replied that Cinnamon was just as worried about Rollin as Crystal was about Dan. Another time, in "The Pilot", where Rollin impersonates a man who has "a real reputation for being a ladies' man", and Cinnamon is supposed to come to his room, he asks her to help him "get in character".

Barbara Bain was married to Martin Landau at the time, and a contract dispute Landau had with the program's producers as the third season wound down resulted in both leaving the cast.

=== Barney Collier ===
Barnard "Barney" Collier’s main role as an IMF agent was that of an electronics and mechanical genius, as well as a forgery expert. He also had an extensive knowledge of building infrastructure such as wiring and plumbing standards, including building standards in foreign countries. Generally, Collier (Greg Morris) was brought in on missions to supply high-tech custom mission support. On occasion, he custom built a computer which was well ahead of its time, such as a computer that could read playing cards face down on a table or could beat the world's greatest chess players. Starting in season five, he was revealed to possess criminology skills that were key to several missions. He was a veteran of the US Navy, specifically the Sixth Fleet. His IMF dossier noted that he owned his own electronics firm. To maintain cover when on personal travel to foreign countries, he once used the alias "Barney Davis", It was a common plot device, throughout the series, for Barney to be smuggled into a building or facility by various means, such as a collapsible filing cabinet, a specially designed crate, or even a janitor's cart, so he could carry out some task in secret.

Due to his being black, his role play in earlier missions which took place in Eastern European countries was often as a supporting character. Those missions which took place in Latin America or the United States gave him the opportunity for more visible roles within the mission. Although Barney Collier is primarily remembered as an electronics expert, he was often called upon for his hand-to-hand combat skills. Notably, he was an accomplished boxer, having been the champion of the Sixth Fleet when he was in the Navy. His boxing skills were the centerpiece of a two-part mission in the third season, "The Contenders". He also had the strength and agility to penetrate denied areas going hand-over-hand using grappling lines without any assistance, shimmying up drainpipes, and rapelling down elevator shafts. He demonstrated incredible fortitude even when injured, continuing with missions even after being shot in the back, the knee, or the head, temporarily blinded by a concussion, or poisoned. In the course of seven seasons' worth of missions, on rare occasions, he killed men in self-defense both in hand-to-hand combat and with firearms. A recurring subtheme for Collier was, when a mission was at risk, his unwavering faith in his fellow agents in their ability to come through.

Barney Collier, along with Willy Armitage, was one of only two IMF agents who were regulars on the team for the entire seven-season run of the original Mission: Impossible TV series. Like all of the regular IMF agents, he was not used in every mission, but he was the only character in the opening credits of every episode of the original series. On occasion, he did not appear during the course of a mission, but the characters used devices that were noted as being supplied by him. In later years of the series, that stayed in the United States and dealt with organized crime, Barney, although still supplying gadgets and devices, did less of the physical duties, and began to be a character more in line of the mimic and master of disguise roles played by Hand and Paris in earlier seasons. In later seasons, Barney was also a de facto second-in-command of the IMF team in situations where Jim Phelps was missing or incapacitated. Barney seems to have a strong friendship with Phelps, in particular, referring to him as a best friend in later years.

Barney had a brother Larry who was a newspaper publisher who was unaware of Barney's career in the IMF. Barney's brother was killed in the fifth-season episode "Cat's Paw" for his efforts to bring a ghetto mob to justice. Larry's murder was the catalyst for the off-book mission in that episode to bring down the mob as a way to avenge Larry's death. In that episode, Barney's mother was still alive.

In the series canon, Barney had a son named Grant, born October 3, 1957, in Georgia. However, by 1970, Barney was single in season four when he met and romanced a woman in a foreign country in an off-book mission and brought her back to the States at the mission's conclusion. (Barney's relationship with an African girl in the season-five episode "Hunted" is interpreted by some as romantic, but the actress in the role was only 17 at the time, and the relationship was most likely meant to be platonic.) Barney reprised his role for three episodes across two missions in the 1988 Mission: Impossible series revival, where his son Grant was an agent. In one of those missions, Barney was extremely despondent at the recent death of Grant's mother. Barney returned to the IMF as an agent to work with another team apart from Jim's group as the inside man investigating a drug cartel.

=== Willy Armitage ===
William "Willy" Armitage’s main role as an IMF agent was that of "muscle" and a supporting player. In the first three seasons, Willy was brought in on missions to work behind the scenes in mission preparation or in minor role-playing, such as a waiter at a party or a maintenance man. Often, he had fewer than 10 words of dialogue per episode, and in two, he has no lines at all. However, starting in season four, his role play, visibility, and dialogue as part of missions did expand, including roles that required foreign-language skills. While he was not generally used in very complex role play, on at least one occasion, his on-the-fly interpersonal skills did save the mission.

Willy's background role meant that he did not get unintentionally captured or trapped as often as other members of the IMF. However, in the season-six episode "Double Dead", Willy was captured in a mission that was almost blown, and the episode had his recovery as the main focus. In the end, Willy's ability to connect personally with one of his captors was instrumental in saving his life. In the season-seven episode "The Deal", Willy was shot after jumping off a boat to avoid capture. While his injuries were serious, he was able to rejoin the team by the end of the episode; however, Willy's disappearance does mark the only time in the entire series that a team member was believed to have been killed in the line of duty.

Even when not out front on missions, he still played a critical role as missions unfolded, often at a moment's notice. On a regular basis, his split-second timing taking down a sniper or other gunman saved the mission, as well as the life of the IMF team member in the crosshairs. In Willy's IMF dossier, he was noted to have set a world record in weight lifting. His extreme strength was particularly leveraged in several missions, mostly in season one. However, notably, in season five, Willy demonstrated a strength level that bordered on the super-human in tearing a vault door off its hinges to save Barney Collier from certain death in a fire trap. Willy was often called upon to carry or wear extremely heavy objects without visible signs of exertion to betray their weight, often as a way of smuggling teammates in and out of secure locations. He was experienced in hand-to-hand combat, and was often called on to silently disable sentries and policemen with a single blow. He had other skills which were leveraged, but not prominently featured, such as automobile customization and custom construction. He often custom-built rooms and scenes to make trapped persons believe they were somewhere they were not, such as a rubber room in a mental hospital, a hospital room 12 years in the future, or a holding cell at a slave auction. Also, he was presumably the best marksman on the team, as he generally was the team member to do any needed planned tasks with a firearm, such as shooting out a tire on a moving vehicle or firing an automatic weapon at someone's feet to get him to surrender. In the episode "Memory", he made reference to having lived in Indiana when he was 10; this is presumably where Willy grew up, as well as the birthplace of actor Peter Lupus.

Over the course of the series, Willy is strongly implied to have been also in part responsible for mission logistics, particularly the procurement and staging of materials, vehicles, etc. in foreign countries. In addition, Willy often acted as support for Barney Collier, particularly when a mission required the use of complicated electronics or required drastic alterations in physical spaces. On many occasions, Willy's construction skills allowed Collier to access the areas required to complete his own tasks.

Willy also ably filled the comparatively less glamorous role of driver for the IMF team. Experienced with a myriad of vehicles, including emergency and construction vehicles, Willy, behind the wheel of a car or panel truck, meeting the rest of the team for their extraction was often the indication of the successful completion of a mission right before the final credits rolled.

Willy Armitage, along with Barney Collier, was one of only two IMF agents who were regulars on the team for the entire seven-season run of the original series. Like all of the regular IMF agents, he was not used in every mission, but he was a regular character each season, though he was replaced by Sam Elliott's character in the opening credits of some season-five episodes. Willy was the only nonsmoker of all the regular IMF team members for the first three seasons.

=== The Voice on Tape ===
The Voice on Tape was that of a nameless, never-seen man who gave Dan Briggs and Jim Phelps their assignments. Briggs and Phelps, as leaders of the IMF, were the only ones ever to listen to the recordings, with the exception of one first-season mission, "Action!", in which Cinnamon Carter listened to the recording. Other than the mention of "The Secretary", the voice never gave any hint as to the organizational structure behind the assignment or the IMF. In each episode, the recording was planted in a different place, such as a doctor's office, behind an elevator control panel, or a pigeon coop on a roof. Some "mission drops" or methods of delivery, such as an out-of-order pay phone and a photo booth, were used more than once. Briggs or Phelps sometimes had to gain access to the recordings by exchanging passwords or countersigns (generally disguised as casual conversations in such cases) with an agent protecting it, and that agent would never be in the room while the recording was played. Pictures of the "mission targets" were almost always included with the assignment. Often, the pictures were in an envelope along with the recording, although they were occasionally shown on a movie screen or seen in a telescope or film viewer. The format of the instructions used in the recording varied slightly from episode to episode, but they generally contained these phrases:

- "Good morning/afternoon/evening, Mr. Briggs/Phelps."
- "Your mission, should you decide/choose to accept it..."
- "As always, should you or any of your IM Force be caught or killed, the Secretary will disavow any knowledge of your actions."
- "This tape/recording will self-destruct/decompose in five seconds/ten seconds/sixty seconds/immediately.” or (in a few early episodes) “Please dispose of this recording/destroy this tape in the usual manner."
- "Good luck, Dan/Jim."

Bob Johnson provided the voice on tape each season and in nearly every episode of the original series, as well as every episode of the revival. The only times the voice on tape did not initiate a mission included one mission ("Memory") where Dan Briggs got his instructions on a card from a street photographer, which he then crumpled and presumably burned; off-book missions run by both Briggs and Phelps, such as "The Ransom" and "The Condemned", one off-book mission run by Rollin Hand where Phelps was incapacitated and needed to be rescued, "The Town", and one other, when mob figures recognize Phelps and Collier from surveillance photos taken during an IMF operation against a syndicate casino ("Casino") and kidnapped Jim to force Barney to organize a mission for them ("Kidnap"). The tape scene was also absent in episodes which began during or after a mission (such as "The Hostage"), presumably these missions were assigned through taped messages which Phelps received offscreen. As a result, the voice on tape was that of the only consistent character through the entire Mission: Impossible television franchise. The recurrence of the voice in opening every episode, its standard delivery, and its consistent use of the same phrases introduced those phrases to the pop culture lexicon, most notably "Your mission, should you choose to accept it" and "This tape will self-destruct in five seconds." Although the phrase "This tape will self-destruct..." has become synonymous with Mission: Impossible, in several episodes, the IMF leader was responsible for destroying the recordings themselves, either in a nearby incinerator or in a container of acid. In the 1996 film and the 2023 film, the voice on the tape is Henry Czerny as Eugene Kittridge, IMF Director in the 1996 film and CIA Director in the 2023 film and the 2025 film. In the 2000 film, it is Anthony Hopkins as Mission Commander Swanbeck. In the 2006 film, it is Billy Crudup as John Musgrave, IMF Director of Operations. In the 2011 film and the 2015 film, it is Teddy Newton. In the 2018 film, it is Christopher McQuarrie. In the 2025 film, it is Angela Bassett as Erika Sloane, CIA director in the 2018 film and President of the United States in the 2025 film.

== Introduced in season two ==
=== Jim Phelps ===
James "Jim" Phelps (portrayed by Peter Graves, in his Golden Globe-winning role in the first two series, and later by Jon Voight in the 1996 film) was the director of the Impossible Missions Force, or IMF, in seasons two through seven of the initial television series (1967–1973), and all of the second series, first taking over the position from Daniel Briggs, and holding it twice within the course of two-and-a-half decades.

==== In television ====
While he was not as personally aloof as his predecessor, Daniel Briggs, had been, Phelps (played on television by Peter Graves) ran equally risky missions and, unlike Briggs, ran missions that put noncombatants in harm's way. Notably, Phelps ran missions that included letting a mobster blow up a car on a city street in the middle of the day, the IMF team capturing and holding the significant others of targets against their will, the IMF team tainting an entire hotel's water supply to give hotel guests symptoms mimicking typhoid, and a member of the IMF committing an armed hijacking of a commercial passenger flight to give credibility to his impersonation of a well-known terrorist.

Also unlike Briggs, who did not participate in about a quarter of the missions he co-ordinated, Phelps accompanied his team on every mission and was an active team member. Although Rollin Hand is generally known as the most versatile role player on the IMF, Phelps successfully played an extremely wide variety of roles, including a timid chemist, a tough-as-nails federal investigator, a gas company inspector, a hardware salesman, a slave trader, and a leader of the American Nazi Party. Often, his role in missions in a foreign country would be that of an American, but he did sometimes impersonate a foreigner, such as an East German policeman. Like Hand and Cinnamon Carter, Phelps was not totally immune to romantic entanglements with enemy agents and defectors. To maintain cover when on personal travel to foreign countries, he once used the alias "Jim Moore".

The 1980s revival series shows Phelps' ID in the opening credits, which state he was born on October 10, 1929, in California. Episodes of the original series establish that he grew up in Norville County (state unknown; there is no actual Norville County in any U.S. state), was a popular quarterback in his youth, and later served in the U.S. Navy. He was the son of the deceased A. Phelps, who owned a marina on a local lake. The business name "A. Phelps and Son" implied that Jim Phelps was his father's only son. During the course of the series, Jim Phelps donated the marina's land to the county to be used as a local park.

In this revival, which lasted for two seasons from 1988 to 1990, Phelps had a successor named Tom Copperfield, who was killed off in the first episode, prompting Phelps to come out of retirement. Phelps was the leader of the IMF for the entire two-season run of the late 1980s revival series. The revived series established continuity with the original, hinting that Phelps continued his IMF work after the conclusion of the original series.

==== In film ====
Phelps is the only character of the original TV series to be used in the subsequent film series. By the time of the events of the original 1996 film, Jim (now played by Jon Voight) is married to Claire Phelps (Emmanuelle Béart), a fellow member of the IMF. Having become disillusioned with the effect that the end of the Cold War has had on his espionage work, he secretly betrays the IMF and makes a deal to sell a list of CIA agents' identities to an arms dealer. He kills three of his own agents, fakes his death, and frames teammate Ethan Hunt (Tom Cruise) as a mole. After Phelps kills his wife, during a confrontation atop a train traveling through the Channel Tunnel, Ethan kills Phelps by blowing up a helicopter on which Phelps is trying to escape. Ethan subsequently becomes the new team leader.

Greg Morris, who played Barney Collier in both television series, walked out of the film premiere halfway through, citing displeasure with the turning of the Jim Phelps character and the overall production, calling it "an abomination." Peter Graves expressed dissatisfaction that he was not asked to reprise the role, and was displeased by "what happens" to the character in the film. Graves had been offered the chance to reprise his role from the TV series but turned it down upon learning his character would be revealed as a traitor and would be killed off at the end of the film.

The character is revealed to have had a son, Jim Phelps Jr. who is a U.S. Intelligence agent who uses the alias "Jasper Briggs" and appears in Dead Reckoning and The Final Reckoning, played by Shea Whigham.

== Introduced in season four ==
=== The Great Paris ===
The Great Paris (whose real name was never revealed) was a retired magician played by Leonard Nimoy (who had been released from the cast of the just-canceled Desilu series Star Trek) who joined the IMF with the first mission of season four, and he stayed with them for two seasons. Effectively, he was a replacement for Hand, who left the IMF at the end of season three. Like Rollin, the Great Paris was a master of role play, languages, and disguises, capable even of successfully impersonating an ethnic Japanese citizen in Japan.

Paris grew up in Cleveland, Ohio, and was raised by his father after Paris was abandoned as a child by his mother. When he later served as a magician's apprentice, he was caught in a love triangle between his mentor and his mentor's assistant. This led to the master magician murdering Paris's love interest, and this painful memory was used against Paris by enemy agents many years later, using a lookalike for Paris's murdered love interest.

Paris's skills as a magician were heavily leveraged when he played Zastro the Magician as part of season four's "The Falcon", the only three-part mission of either series; Nimoy thoroughly enjoyed shooting this mission. Paris's role playing may not have been as over-the-top as Rollin's was, but the Great Paris had a particular talent for a flippant or sarcastic remark at just the right time as part of his role play that would catch targets off-guard. Also, the Great Paris was particularly adept at roles in which he embedded himself as one of the targets and seemingly was working against the IMF team's mission. Paris apparently had a high tolerance for physical pain, because he got "roughed up" by antagonists several times during missions, winding up beaten and bruised, but never compromising the mission. Like some other members of the IMF, Paris was not immune to romantic entanglements with enemy agents who were targeting him, falling for enemy agent Lady Cora Weston in "Lover's Knot", and becoming entangled with phony defector Ingrid Brugge in "My Friend, My Enemy".

=== The Hartford and Globe Repertory Companies ===
The Hartford and Globe Repertory Companies were theatrical repertory companies that were part of the IMF in season four. (Though the Hartford actually first appeared in season three's finale, "The Interrogator"; a similar group, the Horizon Repertory Players, were used by Dan Briggs in season one's "Operation Rogosh".) They were used several times in missions where a larger cast of supporting characters was needed and the IMF leader needed them to role play together as a group. (Hartford was used five times and Globe was used three times.) Examples of the roles the companies played were a submarine crew, prison guards, a surgical team, and the staff of an atomic research facility. Depending on the needs, four to 20 or so members of the company were used as part of a mission when the company was brought in.

The brochure for Hartford Repertory Company, and later the Globe Repertory Company, was a dossier available to Jim Phelps when he was selecting his team. Although the company was selected in the dossier scene when they were included in missions, they almost never participated in the pre-mission briefing and planning session in Jim Phelps’ apartment. (In the episode "Submarine", two members of the Hartford Repertory are seen, but they have no dialogue.) Instead, they made their first appearance during the mission. In addition to their role playing skills, they also were implied to have aided in custom construction. This was evidenced by substantial custom construction in short timeframes in missions in which the company was a part, such as the construction of the working interior of an entire submarine in a hostile country on less than two days' notice.

The members of the company who were used varied from mission to mission. They were never introduced nor referred to by name. They generally only spoke as part of their role play, if at all. The majority of the time, the members of the company used by the IMF were all men; however, women were used on two missions, as well.

The Globe Repertory Company was implied to be used in season five in those missions that used a large group of unnamed American agents for role playing and/or custom construction as part of the mission, such as "The Killer", "Flight", "The Catafalque", and "The Party". However, no dossier scenes were used in those episodes, so the company's use can only be assumed. The series never addresses the logistics of maintaining IMF secrecy with such a large group of people.

=== Tracey ===
Tracey (no last name was given on screen) was an IMF agent who took part in four separate missions in season four, one of which was a three-parter. While she was not a regular member of the IMF (i.e., shown in the opening credits), she is generally considered to be a recurring character because she took part in four missions.

Unlike some other recurring characters, she had no specific expertise beyond her role-play abilities. She did use her ad-hoc seductive skills to save one mission, but she was never purposely given the role of a femme fatale, as Cinnamon Carter often was. As part of her missions, Tracey played a nurse, a magician's assistant who was able to see the future, and twice played a compromised agent.

The actress who played Tracey, Lee Meriwether, had previously been a guest star on Mission: Impossible as Anna Rojak, the kidnapped wife of an Allied scientist in the two-part season-three mission "The Bunker".

== Introduced in season five ==
=== Dana Lambert ===
Dana Lambert (Lesley Ann Warren, credited as "Lesley Warren") replaced Cinnamon Carter, who departed at the end of season three. She appeared only in season five.

Dana's advantage was the ability to play off her youth. With subtle gestures as simple as biting her lower lip, she could portray herself as extremely vulnerable. She was able to relate to and draw in much younger targets than other members of the IMF, for instance in "Blast", and she was also able to draw in men a generation, and even two generations, older, for instance in the episode "Homecoming", set in Phelps' hometown, where she becomes the new barmaid at a local tavern. In spite of her youth, she was capable of detecting attempted deceptions by enemy agents, as well as helping other, more experienced agents with their tasks. She was willing to compromise her personal safety for the sake of the mission, and was able to maintain her composure even when captured. She portrayed a number of roles, including an international jet-setter, a bag woman, a college activist, a nurse, and an up-and-coming singer in a band.

Dana lacked hand-to-hand combat skills. Her inability to disable a single adversary in close quarters led to her needing to be rescued at the last second by the IMF on at least two occasions. Also, she was occasionally over-zealous to move forward in defiance of protocols, necessitating the more experienced agents reining her in. She occasionally displayed over-compassionate feelings about team members when they were in jeopardy, and not putting the mission first, as was the rule in IMF protocol.

=== Dr. Douglas Robert (Lang) ===
Dr. Douglas Robert (Sam Elliott) was a semiregular of the IMF starting with the third mission of season five, "The Innocent". He used the last name "Lang" multiple times as an alias with different first names. Doug's expertise, in addition to role play, was his medical skills and knowledge. In his first mission with the team, he saved Barney Collier's life, which would have been lost, due to accidental poisoning from a biological weapon, had a medical expert not been on the team. He was also skilled in delivering knockout blows from behind, saving missions on a number of occasions. In his professional capacity as a doctor, he appeared to be widely skilled in a number of areas of anatomy and techniques, for instance possessing knowledge on mimicking drugs and later knowledge in plastic surgery and hormones in the season-six episode "Encore".

White's book noted that the character of Doug Robert was brought in to phase out Willy Armitage's character, but fan reaction led producers to bring Willy back. Doug appeared in slightly over half of the season-five missions instead of Willy Armitage. Throughout most of season five, each episode had either Doug or Willy, but never both, with the exception of Doug's first mission ("The Innocent") and Doug's last two missions ("The Party" and "Encore"), which featured both of them. Doug Robert's final appearance in "Encore" was his only episode in season six.

Although his role lasted such a short time, Doug did possess one distinction over all the other characters in the series, in being the only one ever to win an argument with Jim Phelps. In the episode "The Rebel", Jim had sustained a severe bullet wound in one arm, and Doug refused to let it go untreated, despite Jim's insistence that other things took precedence. In the end, Jim sat down and let Doug work, receiving only a glare in return when he urged the physician to hurry it up.

== Introduced in season six ==
=== Lisa Casey ===
Lisa Casey was a regular member of the IMF in seasons six and seven. The show's producer Bruce Geller intended her to be an amalgamation of the master of disguise and femme fatale characters, essentially making her a replacement for both Dana Lambert and the Great Paris following their departures at the end of season five. Geller's producing partner Doug Cramer recommended Lynda Day George for the part, feeling that she had a warmth which would benefit the series. In addition to her role-playing capabilities, Casey had a particular talent for cosmetology, similar to the Great Paris. She was also, like Paris, an expert in voice imitation, and often impersonated girlfriends or associates of gang members in the later seasons. When a mimicry of a male's voice was needed in seasons six or seven, either Barney Collier did it or a male agent with voice mimicry skills or a professional voice actor was brought in for a single mission.

After season six wrapped, George learned that she was pregnant. To accommodate her maternity leave, the production team reduced Casey's role in the first four episodes of season seven and shot ten episodes without her. George named her child Krisinda Casey in part after the character she played. In-universe, Casey was on a long-term deep-cover assignment in Eastern Europe in these episodes, leaving a slot open for a short-term recurring role for Mimi Davis, as well as two other one-time leading female agents. Casey returned full-time later in the season. While she was out, she was referred to regularly and tools used within a mission were sometimes attributed to her. Also, in some episodes, a European portion of the mission was noted as being handled by Casey. In the four season-seven episodes in which she did appear (all filmed immediately before George went on maternity leave), George's body was generally hidden.

Throughout the original series the character was introduced simply as "Casey". In an April 1989 episode of the revival series in which George made a guest appearance (number 17, "Reprisal"), Casey is indicated to be her surname and Phelps addresses her by her first name, Lisa. This was done so that she would not be confused with the character of Casey Randall in the later series. Though Lynda Day George had been greatly cutting down on her acting roles ever since the 1983 death of her husband Christopher George (who guest-starred in an episode of Mission: Impossible), she enjoyed her return to Mission: Impossible, remarking, "I got to be with Peter [Graves] again, and slipped right back into the part."

== Introduced in season seven ==
=== Mimi Davis ===
Mimi Davis's first assignment with the IMF was the first broadcast mission of season seven. She was a prison parolee and recovering alcoholic who was brought in to gain the confidence of an ex-boyfriend who was a target of that mission. As a result of that successful mission, she was released from parole and offered a recurring role with the IMF to fill in for Casey, who was on a long-term assignment in Europe.

Mimi went on to take part in a total of seven missions for the IMF until Casey's full-time return later in season seven. Mimi's role-playing abilities as an unsavory character, possibly as a result of her criminal past, were particularly leveraged in several of her missions, although she played roles as innocents in other missions, as well. In addition to role-playing abilities, she demonstrated basic cosmetology skills used for mimicking facial injuries. During one mission, Mimi persisted in spite of a serious gunshot wound to successfully complete the mission.

Barbara Anderson, the actress who played Mimi Davis in the seventh season, was never given title sequence billing.

== Introduced in 1988–1990 Era ==
=== Nicholas Black ===
He teaches drama at an Eastern University and Excels at Drama, Languages, Disguise and Acting, he was first recruited by Jim Phelps after Tom Copperfield was murdered by an assassin and had been part of his team since. He is also a professional chess player, and had the ability to mimic voices expertly. He was however once compromised by his targets into getting brainwashed in an attempted assassination attempt. He was also noticeably distressed after Casey Randall was killed, though he pressed ahead to finish her last mission.

=== Casey Randall ===
She was a top designer on 3 Continents and helped IMF track down Terrorists responsible for a bombing that killed her husband. She served as fem fatale and had skills in sharp shooting and voice mimicry. Jim recruited her initially to catch Tom Copperfield's murderer and served on her team until she was sent in alone to surveil the home of Luis and Amelia Berezan, Dictators who left their country of Alcante after robbing their treasury. She was caught and killed before the local authorities recovered her body. Jim had to come in to identify her body before the team completed her mission and sent the Berezan's to justice. She was the first IMF agent to be listed as Disavowed.

=== Max Harte ===
He was in high school when the Vietnam War ended, his brother did not return from being held in a camp as a Prisoner of War. Max organized his own mission to find him and did. Jim recruited him to catch Tom Copperfield's murderer and stuck with Jim's team since. Max usually handled in addition to roleplay, being a Lothario, and weaponry skills. The only time he was unsure he could complete an assignment was after Casey Randall was killed while on mission, though he did help to complete her mission.

=== Grant Collier ===
The son of Barney Collier graduating from MIT as one of the greatest inventive minds at 16 to come out of MIT in twenty years. Jim recruited him to assist in catching Tom Copperfield's murderer and stuck with Jim's team since. Like his father he was a handler on the technical side providing the various equipment up to date with the times he lived in. Notable missions he was involved with included rescuing his father Barney, and finding the evidence to convict the Berezan's for Casey Randall's murder. During the mission against the Golden Serpent Triad Organization, Grant had to struggle to hold his professionalism when it was believed that Barney was killed on the assignment to take them down.

=== Shannon Reed ===
Shannon worked for the secret service for five years and also had experience in journalism. Jim recruited her in the mission against the Berezan family and had to replace Casey Randall after she was caught and killed on the mission. She had been with Jim's team since. In addition to roleplay skills and being a Fem Fatale, she was useful on some notable missions including a mission where she became the first IMF agent to operate while in outer space, and a mission where she suffered amnesia and became engaged to the son of the leader of a drug cartel in order to capture him.
