= Terry Markwell =

American actress

- Born: Teresa Markwell; March 3, 1953 (age 73); Phoenix, Arizona, U.S.
- Occupations: Actor, model, interior designer
- Years active: 1986–1996

Terry Markwell (born Teresa Markwell, March 3, 1953) is an American former actress.

Markwell is probably best recognized for having appeared as IMF agent Casey Randall in the 1988–1989 season of Mission: Impossible, playing the only IMF agent in a Mission: Impossible TV series and its revival to ever be caught, killed, and disavowed. The character Casey Randall is a counterpart to Barbara Bain's character Cinnamon Carter and Lesley Ann Warren's character Dana Lambert.

== Work ==
Markwell got her first taste of acting while modeling for Plaza Three, a premiere talent agency in Phoenix during the late 1970s and early 1980s.

Markwell guest starred in the TV-series Return to Eden (1986).

Markwell portrayed IMF agent Casey Randall for the first 12 episodes in Mission: Impossible (1988). Early in her last episode, "The Fortune", the character was captured and killed by lethal injection during a solo assignment. Reportedly, Markwell left the series as she was unhappy with the amount of screen time her character was getting. One reviewer called the entire opening sequence of that episode excellent and by far the most powerful opening yet in the series. He also highlighted as poignant and well done the scene where Peter Graves's character finds out that Casey has died and reacts to the picture of her body on television as part of a news report on an unidentified body. She was replaced by Jane Badler.

After Mission: Impossible, Markwell made guest appearances in the TV-series The Client (1995–1996), Sliders (1996–1997) and The Burning Zone (1996–1997).

In film, Markwell appeared in Stones of Death (1988), Murder 101 (1991), Robo Warriors (1996) and Jane Street (1996) and had minor parts in Grievous Bodily Harm (1988), Red Wind (1991) and The Man Who Wouldn't Die (1994).

Markwell now primarily runs her own interior design company under the name of "Markwell Design Group".
