= Steven Hill =

American actor (1922–2016)

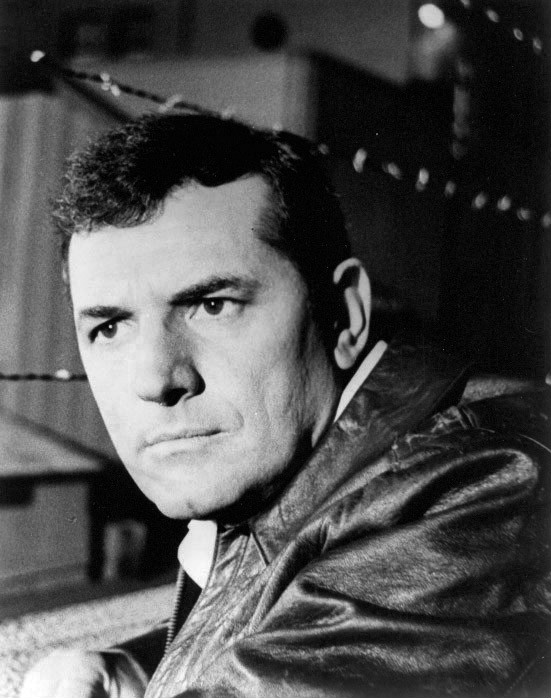
- Hill in 1966
- Born: Solomon Krakovsky; February 24, 1922; Seattle, Washington, U.S.
- Died: August 23, 2016 (aged 94); New York City, U.S.
- Other name: Steve Hill
- Education: University of Washington
- Occupation: Actor
- Years active: 1946–1967; 1977–2000
- Spouses: Selma Stern (m. 1951; div. 1964) Rachel Schenker (m. 1967)
- Children: 9

Steven Hill (born Solomon Krakovsky; February 24, 1922 – August 23, 2016) was an American actor. He is best known for his television roles as district attorney Adam Schiff on the NBC television drama series Law & Order (1990–2000) and Dan Briggs on the CBS action television series Mission: Impossible (1966–1967). For the former, he received two nominations for the Primetime Emmy Award for Outstanding Supporting Actor in a Drama Series.

His film roles include The Goddess (1958), A Child Is Waiting (1963), The Slender Thread (1965), Yentl (1983), Legal Eagles (1986), Raw Deal (1986), Running on Empty (1988), Billy Bathgate (1991), and The Firm (1993).

== Early life ==
Hill was born Solomon Krakovsky (Yiddish: שלמה קראַקאָווסקי) in Seattle, Washington, to Yiddish-speaking Jewish immigrants from the Russian Empire, Hillel Krakovsky (born Chrakovsky; 1888–1975) and Lena Rosen (1898–1999). His father, who owned a furniture store, emigrated from Dmytrivka, Ukraine. He had a brother, Charles, and two sisters, Ruth and Jo Ann. Known as Sol, he decided to become an actor at age six when he played the lead in The Pied Piper of Hamelin.

After graduating from Garfield High School in 1939, Hill attended the University of Washington and served four years in the United States Navy during World War II. He graduated from the University of Washington and moved first to Chicago and then to New York City to pursue an acting career.

== Career ==
=== Debut ===
Hill made his first Broadway stage appearance in Ben Hecht's A Flag Is Born in 1946, which also featured a young Marlon Brando. Hill said that his big break came when he landed a small part in the hit Broadway show Mister Roberts. "The director, Joshua Logan, thought I had some ability, and he let me create one of the scenes," said Hill. "So, I improvised a dialog, and it went in the show. That was my first endorsement. It gave me tremendous encouragement to stay in the business." Hill said this was a thrilling time in his life when, fresh out of the Navy, he played the hapless sailor Stefanowski. "You could almost smell it from the very first reading that took place; this is going to be an overwhelming hit," said Hill. "We all felt it and experienced it and were convinced of it, and we were riding the crest of a wave from the very first day of rehearsals."

=== Actors Studio member ===
In 1947, Hill joined Brando, Montgomery Clift, and Julie Harris, among others, as one of the 50 applicants (out of about 700 interviewed) to be accepted by the newly created Actors Studio.

=== Early screen work ===
Hill made his film debut in 1950 in A Lady Without Passport. He then re-enlisted in the Navy in 1952 for two years and, when he completed his service, resumed his acting in earnest. Strasberg later said, "Steven Hill is considered one of the finest actors America has ever produced." When he was starting out as an actor, Hill sought out roles that had a social purpose. "Later, I learned that show business is about entertaining," he said. "So, I've had to reconcile my idealistic feelings with reality."

=== TV's Golden Age ===
Hill was particularly busy in the so-called "Golden Age" of live TV drama, appearing in such offerings as The Trial of Sacco and Vanzetti in 1960, where he portrayed Bartolomeo Vanzetti. "When I first became an actor, there were two young actors in New York: Marlon Brando and Steven Hill," said Martin Landau, who later became Hill's castmate in the first season of Mission: Impossible. Landau went on to admit, "A lot of people said that Steven would have been the one, not Marlon. He was legendary—nuts, volatile, mad—and his work was exciting."

In 1961, Hill had an unusual experience when he was cast as Sigmund Freud on Broadway in Henry Denker's A Far Country, portraying Freud at the age of 35. For on April 12, 1961, the night of a sold-out performance for the Masters Children's Center of Dobbs Ferry, Hill was stricken with a virus which incapacitated him so severely that as a direct result, just as the curtain was about to rise, the producers decided to cancel the performance. Among the notables in the audience were Joseph P. Kennedy, Jack Benny, and Richard Rodgers. The audience was invited to exchange their ticket stubs for other performances. The understudy was not ready to replace Hill, so Alfred Ryder, the play's director, stepped into the role of Freud for one performance.

In 1961, he was cast as B.E. Langard in the episode "Act of Piracy" of the ABC series, Adventures in Paradise, which starred Gardner McKay. He appeared in the original Robert Stack ABC/Desilu crime drama, The Untouchables episode "Jack 'Legs' Diamond," giving a compelling, cold, evil performance as the eponymous character, and a similar sinister role as a bedridden (following an accident), ruthlessly manipulative millionaire in "The White Knight," a 1966 black-and-white, third-season episode of The Fugitive, which starred David Janssen.

Hill's early screen credits include The Goddess (1958), A Child Is Waiting (1963), and The Slender Thread (1965).

=== Mission: Impossible ===
Hill was the original leader of the Impossible Missions Force, Dan Briggs, in the series Mission: Impossible beginning in 1966. The phrase "Good morning, Mr. Briggs..." was a fixture early in each episode, where a sound or film recording he retrieved detailed the task he must accomplish. However, he was replaced in the show in 1967 after the end of the first season. As one of the few Orthodox Jewish actors working in Hollywood, he made it clear in advance of production that he was not able to work on the Sabbath (i.e., sundown Friday to dusk Saturday), and that he would leave the set every Friday before sundown. However, despite Hill's advance warnings, the show's producers were unprepared for his rigid adherence to the Sabbath, and on at least one occasion, Hill left the set while an episode was still in the midst of filming. The producers used a number of ways of reducing the role of Hill's character, Dan Briggs, whereby he would only obtain and hand out the mission details at the start of certain episodes, being unable to take further part in the mission as he was known to people they would encounter (used at least three times), or Briggs would need to don a disguise and another actor would then play his role incognito until the conclusion of the mission (and episode) when Briggs would peel off a face mask. On other occasions, Briggs was waiting to pick up the team at the end. Usually, Martin Landau's character (Rollin Hand) took over as the team leader for missions in Briggs' absence, Landau being initially a "special guest star" for the first season, not even included in the show's original opening credits.

According to Desilu executive Herb Solow, William Shatner once burst into his office, claiming "Steve asked me how many Jews worked on Star Trek. He was recruiting a minyon, a prayer group of 10 men, to worship together on top of the studio's highest building and only had six Jews so far from Mission. He asked if I would come and bring Nimoy and Justman and you."

Hill was briefly suspended from the show near the end of the season, during the production of episode 23, titled "Action!" In it, for the only time, Barbara Bain's character Cinnamon Carter obtained the mission details through the taped instructions, even though Landau's character, Rollin Hand, then actually led the team. The suspension was imposed after he refused to climb the rafters via a sound stage staircase, as was called for in the script. This incident was ostensibly unrelated to any religious observances of Hill's. Consequently, Hill was written out of that episode and when he returned to Mission: Impossible for the five remaining episodes of the season, his role was severely reduced. Hill was not asked to return for season two and was replaced as the show's star by Peter Graves.

=== Hiatus and return to acting ===
After appearing in Mission: Impossible, Hill did no acting work for the following 10 years. Hill had what he calls "tremendous periods of unemployment" in his career. "What we have here is a story of profound instability and impermanence," he said of his own career. "This is what you learn at the beginning in show business; then it gets planted in you forever." Hill left acting in 1967 and moved to a Jewish community in Rockland County, New York, where he worked in writing and real estate. Patrick J. White, in The Complete "Mission: Impossible" Dossier, quoted Hill as having said later, "I don't think an actor should act every single day. I don't think it's good for the so-called creative process. You must have periods when you leave the land fallow, letting it revitalize itself."

Hill returned to work in the 1980s and 1990s, playing parental and authority-figure roles in such films as Yentl (1983), Garbo Talks (1984), Neil Simon's Brighton Beach Memoirs (1986), Heartburn (1986), Running on Empty (1988), The Boost (1988), Billy Bathgate (1991), and The Firm (1993). Hill also appeared as a mob kingpin in Raw Deal (1986), an action vehicle for Arnold Schwarzenegger. Hill played New York District Attorney Bower in the 1986 comedy-drama Legal Eagles, foreshadowing his appearance as Adam Schiff in Law & Order. Hill had an uncredited cameo in the HBO Movie By Dawn's Early Light (1990), where he played a military officer boarding the new acting president (played by Darren McGaven) to Air Force One in the aftermath of a nuclear attack on the U.S.

=== Law & Order ===
Hill became best known, to an even greater degree than from his role in Mission: Impossible, as Adam Schiff in the NBC TV drama series Law & Order, a part that he played for 10 seasons, from 1990 to 2000. Hill's character was loosely modeled on the real former district attorney of New York City, Robert Morgenthau, and Morgenthau reportedly was a fan of the character. Hill admitted that he found the character of Adam Schiff his most difficult role because of all the legal jargon he had to learn. "It's like acting in a second language," said Hill. Hill added that he agreed with the show's philosophy, saying that "there's a certain positive statement in this show. So much is negative today. The positive must be stated to rescue us from pandemonium. To me it lies in that principle: law and order." Hill earned an Emmy nomination for Best Supporting Actor in a Dramatic Series in 1999 for his work on Law & Order.

== Personal life ==
=== Family ===
Hill and his first wife, Selma Stern, were married in 1951 and had four children before divorcing in 1964. In 1967 Hill married his second wife, Rachel Schenker, and they had five children. He resided in Monsey, New York for many years.

=== Orthodox Judaism ===
In a 1969 interview with The Jewish Press, Hill said: "I used to ask myself, 'Was I born just to memorize lines?' I knew there had to be more to life than that. I was searching—trying to find the answers—to find myself—and I did." Hill said that he had gone home to Seattle ten years earlier and was "feeling depressed because I seemed to be leading an aimless existence. Oh sure, I was a star with all the glamour and everything. But something was missing. My life seemed empty—meaningless."

Appearing as Sigmund Freud in the play A Far Country in 1961 had a profound effect on Hill. In one scene, a patient screams at Freud, "You are a Jew!" This caused Hill to think about his religion. "In the pause that followed I would think, 'What about this?' I slowly became aware that there was something more profound going on in the world than just plays and movies and TV shows. I was provoked to explore my religion."

Hill began to study Torah with Rabbi Yakov Yosef Twersky (1899–1968), the late Skverrer Rebbe, and started adhering to Orthodox Judaism. He observed a kosher diet, prayed three times a day, wore a tallit katan (four-cornered fringed garment) beneath his clothes, and strictly observed Shabbat. Hill's Shabbat observance made him unavailable for Friday night or Saturday matinee performances, effectively ending his stage career; it also made many film roles—most notably a role in The Sand Pebbles—impractical for him.

Letters from Hill sent in 1965 to an Orthodox Jewish friend, describing this challenging period in his life, were found in 2021.

=== Death ===
Hill died of cancer in a New York hospital on August 23, 2016, at the age of 94.

== Filmography ==
=== Film ===
| Year | Title | Role | Notes |
|---|---|---|---|
| 1950 | A Lady Without Passport | Jack | |
| 1955 | Storm Fear | Benjie | |
| 1958 | The Goddess | John Tower | Credited as 'Steve Hill' |
| 1959 | Kiss Her Goodbye | Ed Wilson | |
| 1963 | A Child Is Waiting | Ted Widdicombe | |
| 1965 | The Slender Thread | Mark Dyson | |
| 1970 | Miracle of Survival: Israel's Heroic Battle for Life | | Narrator |
| 1980 | It's My Turn | Dr. Jacob Gunzinger | |
| 1981 | Eyewitness | Lieutenant Jacobs | |
| 1981 | Rich and Famous | Jules Levi | |
| 1983 | Yentl | Reb Alter Vishkower | |
| 1984 | Teachers | Sloan | |
| 1984 | Garbo Talks | Walter Rolfe | |
| 1986 | On Valentine's Day | George Tyler | |
| 1986 | Raw Deal | Martin 'The Hammer' Lamanski | |
| 1986 | Legal Eagles | Bower | |
| 1986 | Heartburn | Rachel's Father | |
| 1986 | Brighton Beach Memoirs | Mr. Stroheim | |
| 1987 | Courtship | George Tyler | |
| 1988 | Running on Empty | Mr. Patterson | |
| 1988 | The Boost | Max Sherman | |
| 1990 | White Palace | Sol Horowitz | |
| 1991 | Billy Bathgate | Otto Berman | |
| 1993 | The Firm | US Attorney F. Denton Voyles | |

=== Television ===
| Year | Title | Role | Notes |
|---|---|---|---|
| 1949 | Suspense | Guest Star | Episode: "The Serpent Ring" (S 2:Ep 7) |
| 1949 | Actors Studio | Guest Star | 4 episodes |
| 1950 | Suspense | Dolph Romano | Episode: "My Old Man's Badge" (S 2:Ep 29); Credited as Steve Hill |
| 1952 | Schlitz Playhouse of Stars | Guest Star | Episode: "The Man that I Marry" (S 1:Ep 16) |
| 1952 | Danger | Guest Star | Episode: "The Hero" (S 2:Ep 28) |
| 1952 | Lux Video Theatre | Hank | Episode: "A Legacy For Love" (S 3:Ep 7) |
| 1953 | The Philco Television Playhouse | Guest Star | Episode: "The Long Way Home" (S 5:Ep 17) |
| 1954 | Goodyear Television Playhouse | Mr. Frank | Episode: "The Inward Eye" (S 3:Ep 11) |
| 1954 | Goodyear Television Playhouse | Guest Star | Episode: "The Arena" (S 3:Ep 21) |
| 1954 | The Philco Television Playhouse | George | Episode: "Middle of the Night" (S 7:p 1) |
| 1954 | The Philco Television Playhouse | Horace Mann Borden | Episode: "Man on the Mountain" (S 7:Ep 3) |
| 1956 | Playwrights '56 | Walter Uhlan | Episode: "Lost" (S 1:Ep 9) |
| 1957 | Studio One | 'Slim' Breedlove | Episode: "The Traveling Lady" (S 9:Ep 28) |
| 1957 | Alfred Hitchcock Presents | Joe Kedzie | Season 3 Episode 7: "Enough Rope for Two"; Credited as Steve Hill |
| 1958 | DuPont Show of the Month | Guest Star | Episode:"The Bridge of San Luis Rey" (S 1:Ep 5) |
| 1959 | Playhouse 90 | Agustin | Episodes: "For Whom the Bell Tolls, part 1" (S 3:Ep 23); "For Whom the Bell Tolls, part 2" (S 3:Ep 24) |
| 1960 | Playhouse 90 | Dr. Edward Gutera | Episode: "Journey to the Day" (S 4:Ep 14) |
| 1960 | Sacco-Vanzetti Story | Bartolomeo Vanzetti | Presented on 'NBC Sunday Showcase (1960); Nominated for Primetime Emmy Awards as "program of the year" |
| 1960 | The Untouchables | Jack "Legs" Diamond | Episode: "Jack "Legs" Diamond" (S 2:Ep 2) |
| 1961 | Adventures in Paradise | B.E. Langard | Episode: "Act of Piracy" (S 2:Ep 18) |
| 1962 | Route 66 | Frank Madera | Episode: "A City of Wheels" (S 2:Ep 17) |
| 1962 | The Untouchables | Joseph December Jr. | Episode: "Downfall" (S 3:Ep 22) |
| 1962 | The Eleventh Hour | Guest Star | Episode: "There Are Dragons in This Forest" (S 1:Ep 2) |
| 1962 | Ben Casey | Ollie | Episode: "Legacy From A Stranger" (S 2:Ep 4) |
| 1962 | Dr. Kildare | Dr. Chandra Ramid | Episode: "The Cobweb Chain" (S 2:Ep 8) |
| 1963 | Ben Casey | Dr. Keith Bernard | Episode: "I'll Be Alright In The Morning" (S 2:Ep 14) |
| 1963 | Naked City | Stanley | Episode: "Barefoot on a Bed of Coals" (S 4:Ep 34) |
| 1963 | Bob Hope Presents the Chrysler Theatre | Ruben Fare | Episode: "Something About Lee Wiley" (S 1:Ep 2) |
| 1963 | Espionage | Andrew Evans | Episode: "The Incurable One" (S 1:Ep 3) |
| 1964 | The Greatest Show on Earth | Guest Star | Episode: "Corsicans Don't Cry" (S 1:Ep 16) |
| 1964 | The Alfred Hitchcock Hour | Charlie Osgood | Season 2 Episode 28: "Who Needs an Enemy?" |
| 1965 | The Alfred Hitchcock Hour | Robert Manners | Season 3 Episode 15: "Thanatos Palace Hotel" |
| 1965 | Kraft Suspense Theatre | Guest Star | Episode: "The Safe House" (S 2:Ep 26) |
| 1965 | Rawhide | Marty Brown | Episode: "The Gray Rock Hotel" (S 7:Ep 30) |
| 1966 | The Fugitive | Glenn Madison | Episode: "The White Knight" (S 3:Ep 26) |
| 1966–1967 | Mission: Impossible | Dan Briggs | Main cast (season 1), 27 episodes |
| 1977 | The Andros Targets | Ed Conway | Episode: "In the Event of My Death" (S 1:Ep 3) |
| 1978 | King | Stanley Levison | TV miniseries |
| 1984–85 | One Life to Live | Aristotle Descamedes | Recurring |
| 1986 | Between Two Women | Teddy Petherton | TV movie |
| 1988 | Thirtysomething | Leo Steadman | Episode: "Business as Usual" (S 1:Ep 15) |
| 1989 | Columbo | Mr. Marosco | Episode: "Murder, Smoke and Shadows" (S 8:Ep 2) |
| 1990–2000 | Law & Order | Adam Schiff | Main cast (seasons 1–10); final appearance |
| 2000 | Law & Order: Special Victims Unit | Adam Schiff | Episode: "Entitled" (S1:Ep 15) |
| 2003 | E's 101: Most Shocking Moments in Entertainment | Himself | Interview |

== Bibliography ==
- White, Patrick J. (1991), The Complete Mission: Impossible Dossier, Avon Books, ISBN 978-0380758777, OCLC 60270697
