= Greg Morris =

American actor (1933–1996)

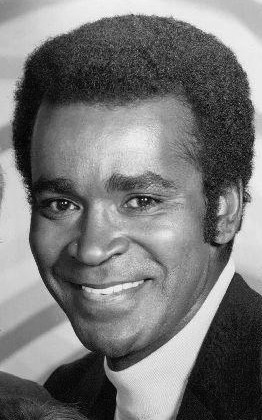
- Morris in 1972 as Barney Collier in Mission Impossible
- Born: Francis Gregory Alan Morris; September 27, 1933; Cleveland, Ohio, U.S.
- Died: August 27, 1996 (aged 62); Las Vegas, Nevada, U.S.
- Education: University of Iowa
- Occupation: Actor
- Years active: 1963–1996
- Spouse: Leona Keyes (m. 1956)
- Children: 3, including Phil and Iona
- Father: Francis Williams

Francis Gregory Alan Morris (September 27, 1933 – August 27, 1996) was an American actor. He was best known for portraying Barney Collier on the television series Mission: Impossible and Lieutenant David Nelson on Vega$.

== Early life and career ==
Born in Cleveland, Ohio, to jazz trumpeter Francis Williams, Morris served in the United States Army during the Korean War. While in college at Iowa on the G.I. Bill, Morris was active in college theater and hosted the late afternoon Jazz radio show, "Tea-Time", on the University of Iowa station, WSUI. He co-produced concerts at the university with a student friend.

Morris began his television acting career in the 1960s, making guest appearances on numerous TV shows such as The Alfred Hitchcock Hour, The Twilight Zone ("The 7th Is Made Up of Phantoms" from 1963), Branded, and Ben Casey. In 1966, Morris was cast in his most recognizable role as the team electronics expert Barney Collier in the TV series Mission: Impossible. Morris acquired a reputation as a practical joker, often playing pranks on the rest of the Mission: Impossible cast and crew. Morris and Bob Johnson were the only actors to remain with Mission: Impossible throughout its entire run.

After Iowa, his first professional stage role was in The Death of Bessie Smith. One of his earliest television roles was a cameo appearance on The Dick Van Dyke Show in the 1963 episode "That's My Boy?" in which Rob Petrie becomes convinced they have taken home the wrong baby from the hospital. The revelation of Morris's character as the other child's father prompted a record setting bout of laughter from the studio audience. He returned to the show in 1965 playing Frank "Sticks" Mandalay, a drummer, an army buddy of Rob. He also appeared in the 1963–64 season of ABC's drama about college life, Channing, starring Jason Evers and Henry Jones.

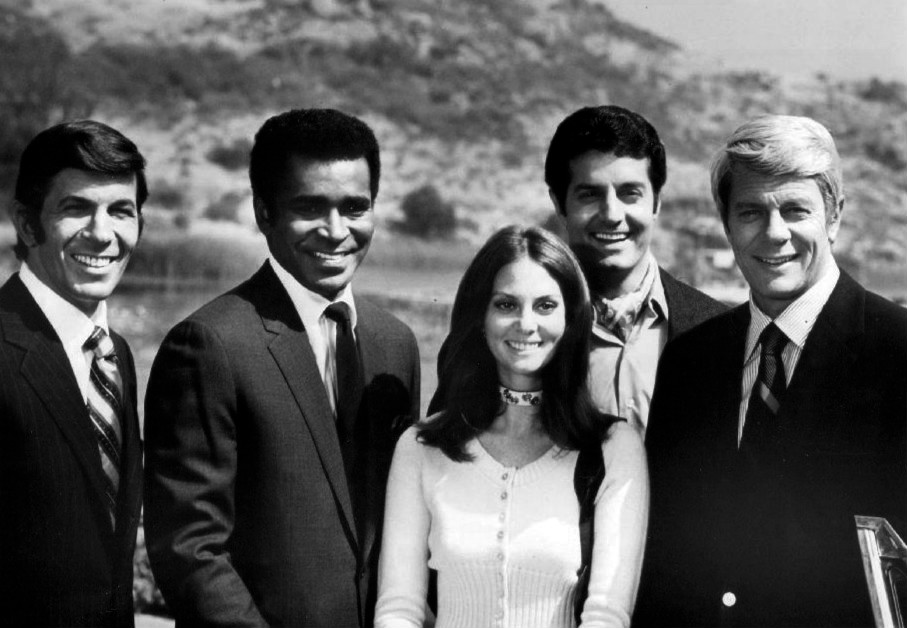
Morris with Mission: Impossible cast in 1970

After Mission: Impossible was cancelled, Morris appeared in several movies and made guest TV appearances, including The Six Million Dollar Man (Episode 1-05, "Little Orphan Airplane", 1974). Morris was then cast as Lieutenant David Nelson of the Las Vegas Metro Police in the ABC TV detective series Vega$ (1978–1981), co-starring Robert Urich, Bart Braverman, and Phyllis Davis. On March 3, 1981, by which point most filming for the season had concluded, Morris was involved in a serious car accident on I-15 near Las Vegas.

After the cancellation of Vega$, Morris continued to make guest TV appearances, including several episodes in the short-lived 1988–1990 remake of the Mission: Impossible TV series, starring his son Phil Morris. Phil Morris was cast as Grant Collier, the son of Barney. Morris also appeared in two episodes of the TV series What's Happening!! as Lawrence Nelson (father of Dwayne) and in three episodes of The Jeffersons, in which he reprised his role as an electronics expert (although not as Barney Collier) in a comparison sequel of the Mission: Impossible series. Morris was also a frequent guest star on Password, Tattletales, and Password Plus in the 1960s and 1970s.

Shortly before his death in 1996, Morris saw the film version of Mission: Impossible starring Tom Cruise. He disliked the movie so much that he left the theater early, calling it "an abomination."

== Personal life ==
Morris married his wife Leona Keyes in 1956, and remained married for 40 years until his death in 1996. Together they had three children, including actor Phil Morris and actress Iona Morris. Leona Morris died on November 2, 2016, aged 81.

== Death ==
Morris died on August 27, 1996, of lung and brain cancer in Las Vegas, Nevada, at the age of 62.

== Filmography ==
Year	Title	Role	Notes
1963	The Alfred Hitchcock Hour	Dr. Foster	Season 1 Episode 17: "Forecast: Low Clouds and Coastal Fog"
1963	Sam Benedict	Victim	Episode: "Of Rusted Cannons and Fallen Sparrows"
1963	Dr. Kildare	Lincoln Ball	Episode: "The Gift of the Koodjanuk"
1963	The Twilight Zone	Lieutenant Woodard	Season 5 Episode 10: "The 7th Is Made Up of Phantoms"
1963	The Lieutenant	Sergeant Perc Linden	Episode: "The Proud and the Angry"
1963	The Lieutenant	Crew Chief	Episode: "The Two Star Giant"
1963	The Dick Van Dyke Show	Mr. Peters	Episode: "That's My Boy??"
1964	The Alfred Hitchcock Hour	Burial Detail Inmate (uncredited)	Season 2 Episode 18: "Final Escape"
1964	The Lieutenant	Crew Chief	Episode: "To Kill a Man"
1964	The New Interns	Dr. Pete Clarke	
1964	The Lively Set	Highway Patrol Officer	
1965	The Fugitive	Mickey Deming	Episode: "Wings of an Angel"
1965	I Spy	Jim Rogers	Episode: "Lori"
1965	The Sword of Ali Baba	Yusef	
1965	The Dick Van Dyke Show	Frank "Sticks" Mandalay	Episode: "Bupkis"
1966	The Doomsday Flight	FBI Agent Balaban	TV movie written by Rod Serling
1966–1973	Mission: Impossible	Barney Collier	Main cast
1973	Mannix	Escaped Convict	Episode: "Climb a Deadly Mountain"
1974	The Six Million Dollar Man	Josh	Episode: "Little Orphan Airplane"
1974	Match Game	Himself	Game Show Participant / Celebrity Guest Star
1975	The Streets of San Francisco	Eddie Griffin	Episode: "Merchants of Death"
1976	Countdown at Kusini	Red Salter	
1976	S.T.A.B.	Richard Hill	Thai film
1976	Sanford and Son	Willis	Episodes: "The Hawaiian Connection", parts 1 & 2
1977	What's Happening!!	Lawrence Nelson	Episode: "If I'm Elected"
1978	Wonder Woman	Caribe	Episode: "Light-Fingered Lady"
1978	Quincy, M.E.	Cliff Collier	Episode: "A Night to Raise the Dead"
1978	Fantasy Island	Ted Harmon	Episode: "War Games / Queen of the Boston Bruisers"
1978	The Eddie Capra Mysteries	Shelby	Episode: "The Intimate Friends of Janet Wilde"
1978–1981	Vega$	Lieutenant Dave Nelson	Recurring
1978	The Love Boat	Guest star	Episode: "Till Death Do Us Part – Maybe/Chubs/Locked Away"
1979	Password Plus	Himself	Game Show Participant / Celebrity Guest Star
1979	Roots: The Next Generations	Beeman Jones	Miniseries, part 1
1979	What's Happening!!	Lawrence Nelson	Episode: "Dwayne's Debate"
1983	The Fall Guy	Gary Jordan	Episode: "P.S., I Love You"
1983	The Jeffersons	Jimmy's Cousin	Episodes: "Mission: Incredible" parts 1-3
1983	Fantasy Island	Chief of Surgery	Episode: "The Wedding Picture / Castaways"
1984	T. J. Hooker	Dave Reemer	Episode: "Exercise in Murder"
1984	Murder, She Wrote	Lieutenant Andrews	Episode: "Lovers and Other Killers"
1985	Super Password	Himself	Game Show Participant / Celebrity Guest Star
1988	War of the Worlds	General Masters	Episode: "The Second Seal"
1988–1990	Mission: Impossible	Barney Collier	Recurring
1989	The Adventures of Superboy	Damon	Episode: "The Invisible People"
1995	TekWar	Hacker	Episode: "Killer Instinct"
