= Bob Johnson (actor) =

American actor (1920-1993)

- Born: Robert Cleveland Johnson; May 4, 1920; Portland, Oregon, U.S.
- Died: December 31, 1993 (aged 73); Molokai, Hawaii, U.S.
- Occupation: Actor
- Years active: 1956–1991

Robert Cleveland Johnson (May 4, 1920 – December 31, 1993) was an American actor and voice actor who played supporting roles on series television and in films from the late 1950s until a few years before his death. Johnson is probably best known as the "voice behind the scenes," who gave Special Agents Dan Briggs and Jim Phelps their recorded mission briefings on both incarnations of the Mission: Impossible television series. The "Voice" was never identified by name, title, or position and was only heard in recordings, but nevertheless became one of the most iconic features of the show. He was the "voice on disc" for the 1980s revival of the series as well.

Prior to his work on Mission: Impossible, Johnson frequently provided the voices of numerous alien creatures on The Outer Limits. He was uncredited for all, except for his work as the alien "Senator" in the episode "Fun And Games".

Bob Johnson was born in Portland, Oregon, and he died at the age of 73 in Molokai, Hawaii on December 31, 1993.
