= Crawl (soundtrack) =

Crawl (Music from the Motion Picture)

Film score by Max Aruj and Steffen Thum
- Released: July 12, 2019
- Recorded: May–June 2019
- Studio: Synchron Stage Vienna
- Length: 49:56
- Label: Paramount Music
- Producer: Lorne Balfe

Max Aruj chronology
Down on the Sidewalk in Waikiki (2019)	Crawl (Music from the Motion Picture) (2019)	This Is Football (2019)

Steffen Thum chronology
Manipulation (2019)	Crawl (2019)	Looking Up (2019)

Crawl (Music from the Motion Picture) is the soundtrack to the 2019 horror film Crawl, which consisted of the film score composed by Max Aruj and Steffen Thum and produced by Lorne Balfe. The soundtrack was released under the Paramount Music label on July 12, 2019.

== Development ==
In May 2019, it was reported that Max Aruj and Steffen Thum would write and compose the score for Crawl with Lorne Balfe handling the music production; the duo had collaborated on multiple projects while working under Remote Control Productions, including on the Netflix film iBoy (2017). Aja said that the initial composer left the project due to creative differences which resulted in Aruj and Thum's later involvement when the film was under post-production. The duo had less than a month to compose the score; Paramount reassured them the film would not be delayed after Aja expressed his concerns.

Aruj involved in the meeting with Aja and the film's producer Sam Raimi and discussed on sketching new musical ideas and methods he would approach for the score. They wanted an alligator which would feel medieval and rather prehistoric. As a result, Aruj and Thum came up with the particular theme which he learnt about while referencing Jaws (1975) and its musical score by John Williams. It appears as a recurring motif throughout the film. Most of the music had been written to picture, due to their involvement in the middle of post-production and was guided by Aja who provided specific instructions on how the score should be constructed.

The score was recorded at the Synchron Stage Vienna during late-May and early-June, a month ahead of the film's release.

== Release ==
Crawl (Music from the Motion Picture) was released day-and-date with the film on July 12, 2019, under the Paramount Music label. It was initially made available only through music streaming services and for digital download. Intrada Records published the album in CDs on October 8, 2019. The soundtrack was further made available in vinyl LPs by Rusted Wave and Mondo and was released on March 6, 2020.

== Reception ==
Ben of Soundtrack Universe wrote "Crawl will not appeal to all film musical tastes, but for those that enjoy a well crafted yet simple horror score with a clear narrative flow, definitely give this work a go." Jack Bottomley of The Yorkshire Times called it as "a knockout score by Max Aruj and Steffen Thum evokes a haunting air of [Benjamin] Wallfisch and [Hans] Zimmer's score for Blade Runner 2049". Owen Gleiberman of Variety and John DeFore of The Hollywood Reporter called it as "exhilarating" and "haunting".

== Track listing ==
Crawl (Music from the Motion Picture) track listing
No.	Title	Length
1.	"Race Day"	2:36
2.	"Reckless"	1:26
3.	"Family Photos"	1:03
4.	"Ghost Town"	1:22
5.	"Shattered"	1:02
6.	"Crawl Space"	2:41
7.	"Red Eyes"	3:52
8.	"Tag Team"	1:44
9.	"Wounded"	1:04
10.	"Gas Station Attack"	1:56
11.	"Trapped"	1:05
12.	"Open Water"	2:48
13.	"Years Lost"	2:40
14.	"Battle Plan"	3:23
15.	"Gator Nest"	2:52
16.	"Dive"	3:22
17.	"Drowning"	1:46
18.	"Survival"	1:18
19.	"Washed Out"	1:24
20.	"Swim for It"	1:35
21.	"Higher Ground"	2:01
22.	"Confessions"	1:00
23.	"Death Roll"	1:46
24.	"Help Arrives"	1:58
25.	"Haley's Theme"	2:12
Total length:		49:56

== Personnel ==
Credits adapted from Paramount Music.

- Max Aruj – composer
- Steffen Thum – composer
- Lorne Balfe – producer
- Shane Rutherfoord-Jones – orchestrator
- Peter Gregson – cello
- Programming: Matt Bowlder – programming
- Bernd Mazagg – recording
- Seth Waldmann – mixing
- Robert Vosgien – mastering
- Nate Hill – music editor
- Nicholas Fitzgerald – music editor
- Joseph Cho – technical assistance
- Michael Bitton – technical assistance
- 14th Street Music – music services
- Queenie Li – music production coordinator
- Dan Goldwasser – art direction (at Warm Butter Design)

== Release history ==
Release dates and formats for Crawl (Music from the Motion Picture)
Region	Date	Format(s)	Label	Ref.
Various	July 12, 2019	Digital download; streaming	Paramount Music	
Various	October 8, 2019	CD	Intrada	
Various	March 6, 2020	Vinyl	Rusted Wave; Mondo	
