= Vienna Synchron Stage =

Recording studio in Vienna, Austria

Coordinates: 48.16153°N 16.27947°E

Vienna Synchron Stage (formerly known as "Synchron Stage Vienna") is a recording facility specializing in recording large orchestras and film music. The landmark protected building, formerly "Synchronhalle" ("Hall 6") of the historic film lot "Film City Vienna" in the Austrian capital's 23rd district is operated by Vienna Symphonic Library.

== History ==
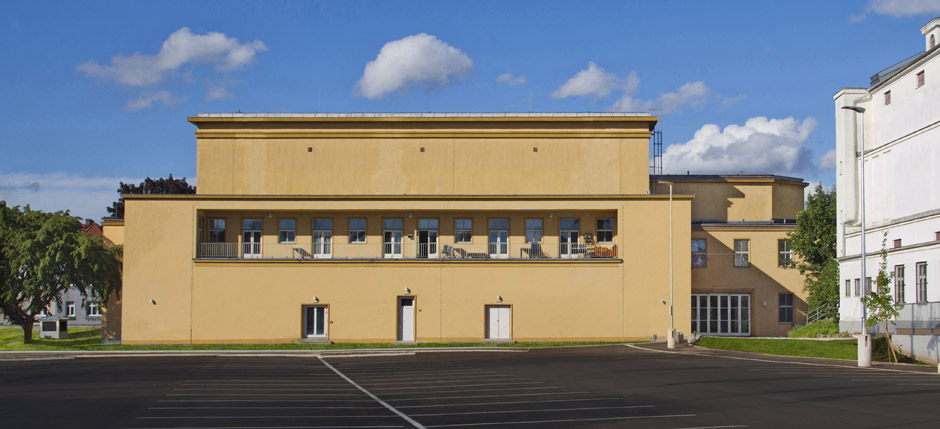
The landmark protected building of Synchron Stage Vienna formerly "Synchronhalle"

The building was constructed from 1939 to 1941 for picture-synchronized sound recordings, from which the name "Synchronhalle" derived. Joseph Goebbels is said to have commissioned the construction himself in order to shoot Nazi propaganda films with the UFA film stars of the time in Vienna. A company-owned airport and a subway station directly in front of the entrance to the film studios were planned for fast transportation.

This plan was considered in the construction of the facility: In order to shield noise and vibrations from the outside world, the hall was isolated from the rest of the building by a custom foundation and insulated against air traffic by an elaborate roof structure. The result was a house-in-house construction with the recording rooms inside. The outer shell provided office space as well as cutting rooms.

Until the 1950s, the facility shared its history with the Rosenhügel-Filmstudios. At that time the "Synchronhalle" hosted as many as ten large orchestra film score projects per year. A remnant of the building's designated use is the preserved "Lenkwil" cinema organ with three manuals that features not only various instrumental timbres but also sound effects such as rolling thunder, car horns, clopping horses, twittering birds and ocean waves. It is the only cinema organ in the world that is still housed in its original scoring stage. Because of this combination the Federal Monuments Office classified this building as a historical monument.

In the mid-1960s, the complex was acquired by the Austrian Broadcasting Corporation (ORF), initializing an era of revival. Eminent classical artists such as Karl Böhm, Herbert von Karajan, Yehudi Menuhin, Sviatoslav Richter and Mstislav Rostropovich discovered the exceptional acoustic properties and used the "Synchronhalle" for many legendary recordings.

After a few years, the use of the hall came to a standstill. Until 1990, it was primarily used as a rehearsal stage for the Theater an der Wien. The ORF made several efforts to sell the entire area. The landmark protection of the two halls 1 (artificial light studio) and 6 (Synchronhalle) made this impossible. In the end, all surrounding buildings on the site were demolished.

In 1990, a private investor planned to build a supermarket and shopping center in the Synchronhalle. This was prevented by the commitment of ORF's General Director, Thaddäus Podgorski. The ORF initially bought back the area and leased it to Filmstadt Wien GmbH. Subsequently, films such as Der Bockerer II - Österreich ist frei (1996), Comedian Harmonists (1997) and Die Klavierspielerin (2001) were shot on the Rosenhügel.

=== 2013: Acquisition and renovation ===
The hall was purchased by the Vienna Symphonic Library in 2013 and developed into a music production facility in collaboration with the Walters-Storyk Design Group and architects Schneider+Schumacher. It was completed in September 2015. The heart of the more than 2,000 m² area is the large recording hall, Stage A: with its 540 m², it offers space for an orchestra of up to 130 people.

The first project was recorded in October 2015 with Grammy Award winning recording and mixing engineer Dennis Sands and composer/orchestrator/conductor, Conrad Pope. Shortly after the official opening, Hans Zimmer's Remote Control Productions chose Synchron Stage Vienna to record a whole slate of productions, including music for Inferno, starring Tom Hanks (directed by Ron Howard, music by Hans Zimmer), and the Netflix series The Crown by Peter Morgan (music by Hans Zimmer and Rupert Gregson-Williams).

In March 2016, the Vienna Symphonic Library business offices moved into the new facility. Vienna Synchron Stage's acoustic design was nominated for 32nd TEC Award at NAMM Show in Anaheim 2017.

== Recording facilities ==
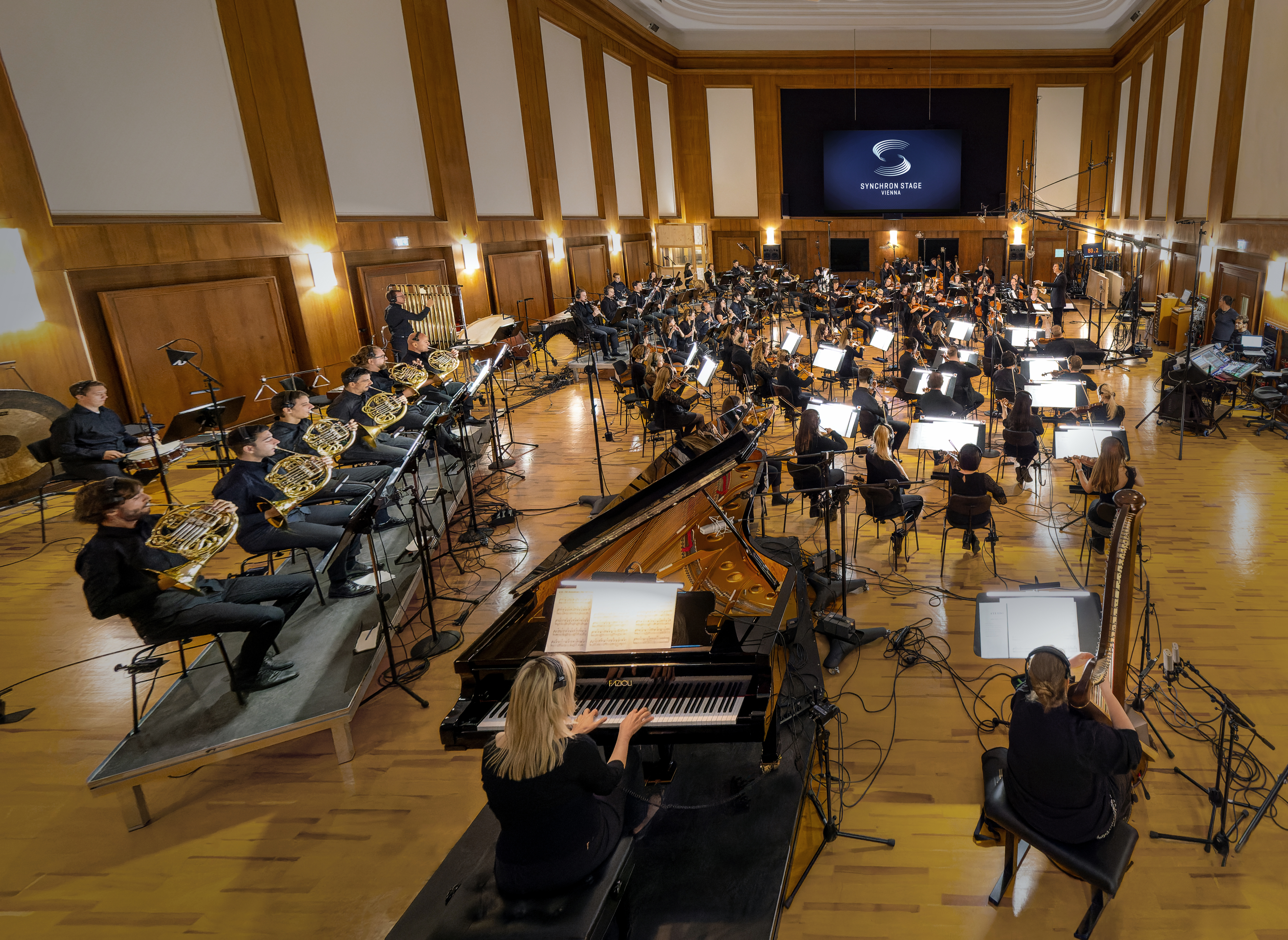
Vienna Synchron Stage's large recording hall "Stage A".

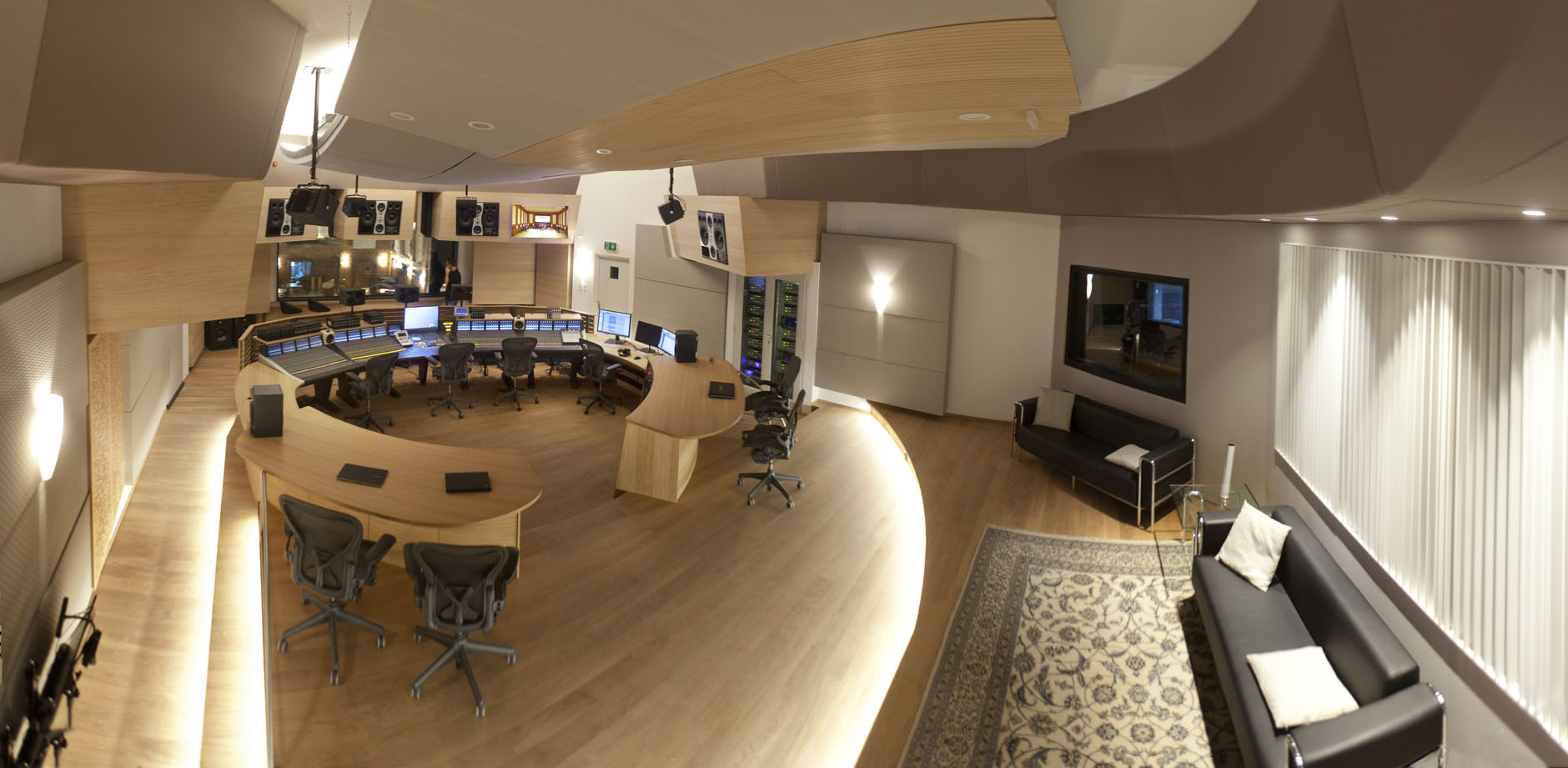
Control A

Vienna Synchron Stage is a recording facility that merges traditional and novel recording technologies and workflows with Vienna Symphonic Library's software innovations. It combines a scoring stage with several studios, isolation booths and office space used by clients and Vienna Symphonic Library's software and sample development business.

Stage A, the large main hall, accommodates orchestras of up to 130 musicians and is built as a room-in-room construction, with an up to 10-foot gap between walls, ensuring entire sonic isolation from outside noise. Additional studios and offices surround the central stage, including Stage B, another recording room, Control Rooms A and B, several lounges, isolation booths ("iso booths"), instrument storage rooms and a score archive. The facility offers the ability to route any signal source to any room of the building, including offices, without any latency or loss of audio quality. The stages and control rooms can be configured modularly depending on the recording requirements. Film composers can record their scores or augment their virtual symphonic cues with a real orchestra.

The basement comprises storage rooms for pianos and approximately 300 percussion instruments. All rooms are connected to the same ventilation system used by the recording stages, so the stored instruments are always pre-acclimated for recording. An elevator connects the storage rooms directly with Stage A.

Since 2021, Vienna Synchron Stage has been an official Dolby Atmos studio and can offer recordings in Auro-3D in addition to stereo and surround.

=== Instruments ===
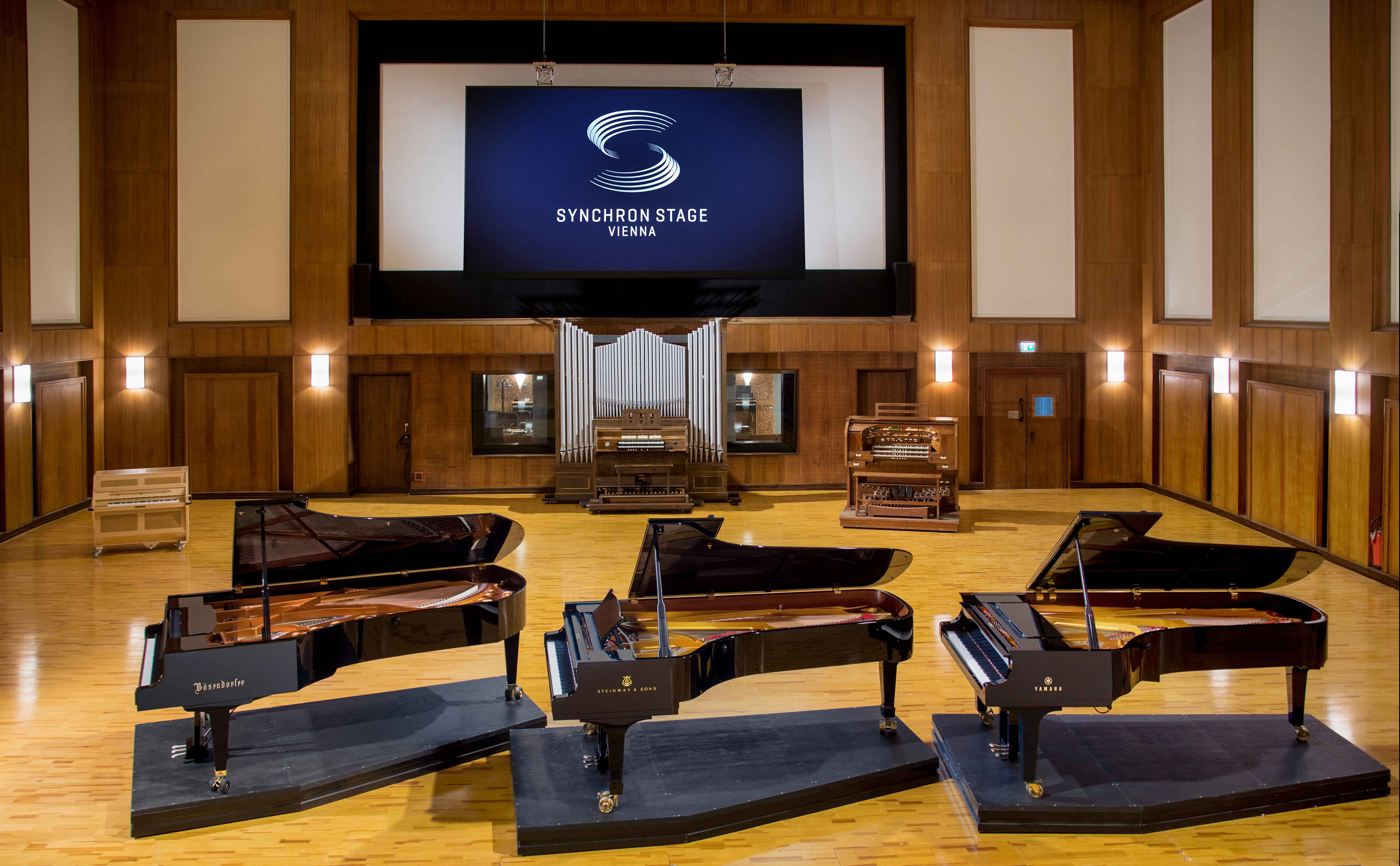
f.l.t.r. front: Bösendorfer Imperial 290, Steinway & Sons D-274 Hamburg Model, Yamaha Disklavier CFX EN PRO. back right: landmarked "Lenkwil" cinema organ. back center: Molzer organ. Stage A, Vienna Synchron Stage.

Vienna Synchron Stage currently offers four concert grand pianos, a Steinway D-274 and two remotely accessible pianos, a Bösendorfer 290 Imperial with CEUS performance reproducing system and a Yamaha Disklavier CFX EN PRO and a Fazioli F308.

The Bösendorfer CEUS technology and the Yamaha Disklavier reproducing system incorporate computer controlled mechanisms to record performances and accurately play them back on the acoustic instrument. With the CEUS system, solenoids activate each key and pedal to mirror the original, recorded performance. The ability to accurately capture a performance in terms of timing and loudness is an important step in retaining the player's unique expression. The performance reproducing pianos have several applications, e.g., a recorded piano performance can be edited in order to correct notes or to adjust dynamics and timing. Furthermore, a single pianist has the opportunity to perform a piece for four hands, accompanying an initial performance with a second take. A piano performance, played anywhere in the world, can be reproduced and recorded in one of Synchron Stage's rooms.

Furthermore, the numerous percussion instruments and a Lyon & Healey harp are available for recordings.

=== Vienna Synchron Orchestra ===
The in-house "Vienna Synchron Orchestra" is not a fixed ensemble but draws on a large pool of musicians from Vienna and the surrounding area. They play in all the major orchestras in Vienna and have been selected according to strict criteria to meet the demands of modern media music productions. Contractor Marton Barka is responsible for putting together the right instrumentalists for each project. Depending on the requirements, a wide range of styles can be covered, from classical film music and big band to pop/rock and jazz.

== Projects ==
In addition to sampling sessions for the Vienna Symphonic Library's products, the Vienna Synchron Stage has established itself as a fixture in the international film industry, regularly hosted music recordings for national and international film and television productions since its opening. Production companies from around the world, including Netflix, Sony Pictures Entertainment, Terra Mater Factual Studios, Marvel Studios and more, regularly record with the "Synchron Stage Orchestra".

Recent notable projects include the film scores for The Meg (2018), Ad Astra (2019), Klaus (2019), as well as Promising Young Woman (2020) and Over the Moon (2020). With the 2022 blockbuster Moonfall, Roland Emmerich had his film score recorded in Vienna for the second time in a row. For the final soundtrack, recordings with the Synchron Stage Orchestra were partially combined with samples from the Vienna Symphonic Library.

The music for the successful Marvel miniseries WandaVision (which was nominated 21 times for the 2021 Primetime Emmy Awards), Hawkeye, Moon Knight, She-Hulk: Attorney at Law and Ms. Marvel was also recorded at Synchron Stage.

== List of projects ==
=== 2026 ===
Production	Type	Music
Dhurandhar: The Revenge	Film	Shashwat Sachdev
La bola negra	Film	Raül Refree

=== 2025 ===
Production	Type	Music
Dhurandhar	Film	Shashwat Sachdev
Kesari Chapter 2	Film	Shashwat Sachdev
Captain America: Brave New World	Film	Laura Karpman
Ne Zha 2 (orig. title: Nezha: Mo Tong Nao Hai)	Film	Roc Chen
Creation of the Gods II: Demonic Confrontation	Film	Gordy Haab
Operation Hadal (orig. title: Jiao Long Xing Dong)	Film	Elliot Leung
Reacher Season 3	TV series	Tony Morales
The Legend of Ochi	Film	David Longstreth
Daredevil: Born Again	TV series	The Newton Brothers

=== 2024 ===
Production	Type	Music
Godzilla x Kong: The New Empire	Film	Tom Holkenborg & Antonio Di Iorio
The Acolyte	TV series	Michael Abels
Avatar: The Last Airbender	TV series	Takeshi Furukawa
Interview with the Vampire Season 2	TV series	Daniel Hart
The Day of the Jackal	TV series	Volker Bertelmann
Indiana Jones and the Great Circle	Video game	Gordy Haab
Marvel Rivals	Video game	Masahiro Aoki
Star Wars: The Bad Batch Season 3	TV series	Kevin Kiner
X-Men '97	TV series	The Newton Brothers
Call of Duty Mobile Main Theme	Video game	Hans Zimmer & Stewart Mitchell
The Rings of Power Season 2	TV series	Bear McCreary
Agatha: Coven of Chaos (previously Agatha All Along)	TV series	Chris Beck
Dune: Prophecy	Video game	Volker Bertelmann
The Count of Monte Cristo	Film	Volker Bertelmann
Kraven the Hunter	Film	Benjamin Wallfisch

=== 2023 ===
Production	Type	Music
American Fiction	Film	Laura Karpman
Ant-Man and the Wasp: Quantumania	Film	Christophe Beck
Creation of the Gods I: Kingdom of Storms (orig. title: Feng shen Di yi bu: Zhao Ge feng yun)	Film	Gordy Haab
Gran Turismo	Film	Lorne Balfe
Guardians of the Galaxy Vol. 3	Film	John Murphy
Mission: Impossible – Dead Reckoning Part One	Film	Lorne Balfe
Scream VI	Film	Brian Tyler & Sven Faulconer
The Wandering Earth 2 (orig. title: Liu lang di qiu 2)	Film	Roc Chen
Loki Season 2	TV series	Natalie Holt
Secret Invasion	TV series	Kris Bowers
Marvel's What If...? Season 2	TV series	Laura Karpman
Reacher Season 2	TV series	Tony Morales
Star Wars: The Bad Batch Season 2	TV series	Kevin Kiner
Star Wars: Young Jedi Adventures	TV series	Matt Margeson
Asgard's Wrath 2	Video game	Rob Westwood
Star Wars Jedi: Survivor	Video game	Gordy Haab & Stephen Barton

=== 2022 ===
Production	Type	Music
Water Gate Bridge (orig. title: Chang jin hu zhi shui men qiao)	Film	Elliot Leung, Zhiyi Wang, Ye Li
Voy a pasármelo bien	Film	Zeltia Montes
I Am Groot	Animated Series of Short Films	Daniele Luppi
Interview with the Vampire	TV series	Daniel Hart
God of War: Ragnarök	Video game	Bear McCreary
The Guardians of the Galaxy Holiday Special	Television Special	John Murphy
Fortnite: Chapter 4	Video game	Phill Boucher
His Dark Materials - Season 3	TV series	Lorne Balfe
The Lord of the Rings: The Rings of Power	TV series	Bear McCreary
The Sandman	TV series	David Buckley
Man vs. Bee	TV series	Lorne Balfe
Ms. Marvel	TV series	Laura Karpman
She-Hulk: Attorney at Law	TV series	Amie Doherty
Brahmastra Part One: Shiva	Film	Pritam
Beavis and Butt-Head Do the Universe	Animated Film	John Frizzeli
Moon Knight	TV series	Hesham Nazih
Hawkeye	TV series	Christophe Beck, Michael Paraskevas
Harry Potter 20th Anniversary: Return to Hogwarts	Television Special	Charlie Mole
Moonfall	Film	Harald Kloser, Thomas Wander
Reacher	TV series	Tony Morales
Mobile Suit Gundam: The Witch from Mercury	Anime TV series	Takashi Ohmama

=== 2021 ===
Production	Type	Music
Around the World in 80 Days	TV series	Christian Lundberg
The Unforgivable	Film	Hans Zimmer, David Fleming
Foundation	TV series	Bear McCreary
Epic	Music album	Schiller
Pennyworth - Season 2	TV series	David E. Russo
Age of Empires IV	Video game	Tilman Sillescu, Alexander Röder, Henning Nugel, Armin Haas, Mikolai Stroinski
Fortnite: Chapter 2	Video game	Phill Boucher
Silent Night	Film	Lorne Balfe
Cinderella	Film	Mychael Danna, Jessica Weiss
Vivo	Film	Alex Lacamoire, Lin-Manuel Miranda
WandaVision	Miniseries	Christophe Beck
9/11: Inside the President's War Room	Film	Segun Akinola
The Battle at Lake Changjin (orig. title: Chang jin hu)	Film	Elliot Leung, Zhiyi Wang
Diary of a Wimpy Kid	Animated Film	John Paesano
Back to the Outback	Animated Film	Rupert Gregson-Williams
Ophelia Riddle and the Book of Secret Stories	Music album	Harry Lightfoot
Innistrad: Midnight Hunt - Magic: The Gathering	Video game Trailer	Gordy Haab
Blade & Soul 2	Video game	Taro Iwashiro
Built to Last	Song	David Tobin, Jeff Meegan
2020 Summer Olympics opening ceremony	Song	Hans Zimmer
Symphony No. 41 in C Major	Live Concert Stream	Wolfgang Amadeus Mozart
Symphony No. 9 in E Minor	Live Concert Stream	Antonin Dvořák
Symphony No. 4 in E Minor	Live Concert Stream	Johannes Brahms

=== 2020 ===
Production	Type	Music
Moonbound	Animated Film	Ali N. Askin
We Can Be Heroes	Film	Robert Rodriguez
The Christmas Chronicles 2	Film	Christophe Beck
The Arctic: Our Last Great Wilderness	Documentary Film	Alex Heffes
Rebuilding Paradise	Documentary Film	Lorne Balfe, Hans Zimmer
Dune	Film	Hans Zimmer
Jungleland	Film	Lorne Balfe
His Dark Materials - Season 2	TV series	Lorne Balfe
Over the Moon	Animated Film	Steven Price
Tesla	Film	John Paesano
Genius: Aretha	TV series	Terence Blanchard
The Rescue	Film	Elliot Leung
Lost in Russia (orig. title: Jiong ma)	Film	Fei Peng
Promising Young Woman	Film	Anthony B. Willis
Fengshen Trilogy	Film	Gordy Haab
Source Elements	Documentary Short Film	Joe Cassidy
Game for Peace	Video game	Austin Wintory
Made in Abyss (orig. title:Fukaki Tamashî no Reimei)	Film	Kevin Penkin
The Stunt Double	Short Film	Lorne Balfe
Symphony No. 9 in D minor	Live Concert Stream	Ludwig van Beethoven

=== 2019 ===
Production	Type	Music
Master Moley	Animated Short Film	Lorne Balfe
Made in Abyss: Tabidachi no Yoake	Film	Kevin Penkin
Uri: The Surgical Strike	Film	Shashwat Sachdev
Sea of Shadows	Documentary Film	H. Scott Salinas
Happy Death Day 2U	Film	Bear McCreary
The Story of God with Morgan Freeman	Documentary Series	Steffen Thum
Kingdom (Original: Kingudamu)	Film	Yutaka Yamada
Poms	Film	Deborah Lurie
Rim of the World	Film	Bear McCreary
Wiener Blut	Film	Johannes Vogel
Looking Up (orig. title: Yin he bu xi ban)	Film	Steffen Thum
Crawl	Film	Max Aruj, Steffen Thum
The Rookies (orig. title: Su ren te gong)	Film	Dong-jun Lee
Shanghai Fortress (orig. title: Shang hai bao lei)	Film	Dong-jun Lee
Ad Astra	Film	Max Richter, Lorne Balfe
Midway	Film	Harald Kloser, Thomas Wander
His Dark Materials - Season 1	TV series	Lorne Balfe
This Is Football	Documentary Series	Max Aruj, Steffen Thum, Lorne Balfe
Crash Landing On You (orig. title: Sa-rang-eui bul-sa-chak)	TV series	Nam Hye-Seung
Red Bracelets: The Beginning (orig. title: Club der roten Bänder - Wie alles begann)	Film	Jens Oettrich
6 Underground	Film	Lorne Balfe
Klaus	Animated Film	Alfonso G. Aguilar
Das letzte Problem	Film	Herbert Tucmandl
Snowbrawl - Apple iPhone 11 Pro	Commercial	Benjamin Wallfisch
Four iconic filmmakers pay tribute to their mentors - Rolex	Commercial	
Get Smarter - TD Ameritrade	Commercial	
Switch to Super - Virgin Media	Commercial	
Loud & Clear - Stolichnaya	Commercial	Hans Zimmer, Lorne Balfe

=== 2018 ===
Production	Type	Music
Proud Mary	Film	Fil Eisler
Return of the Hero (Original: Le retour du héros)	Film	Mathieu Lamboley
Blue Planet II	Documentary TV Series	Hans Zimmer, David Fleming, Jacob Shea
Studio 54	Documentary Film	Lorne Balfe
Pacific Rim: Uprising	Film	Lorne Balfe
Detroit: Become Human	Video game	Philip Sheppard, Nima Fakhrara, John Paesano
The Meg	Film	Harry Gregson-Williams
Ignite	Documentary Short Film	Max Aruj, Steffen Thum
Warning Shot	Film	Max Aruj, Steffen Thum
Hell Fest	Film	Bear McCreary
Mr. Sunshine (Original: Miseuteo Sunshain)	TV series	Nam Hye-seung
Legend of the Ancient Sword (Original: Gu jian qi tan zhi liu yue zhao ming)	Film	Lasse Enersen
The Girl in the Spider's Web	Film	Roque Baños

=== 2017 ===
Production	Type	Music
Cold Hell (Original: Die Hölle)	Film	Marius Ruhland
The Lego Batman Movie	Animated Film	Lorne Balfe
Ghost in the Shell	Film	Lorne Balfe, Clint Mansell
Raising a Rukus	VR-Animated Short Film	Sven Faulconer
Comrade Detective	TV series	Joe Kraemer
Bullyparade - Der Film	Film	Ralf Wengenmayr
Made in Abyss	TV series	Kevin Penkin
Sky Hunter (Original: Kong tian lie)	Film	Andrew Kawczynski
Maria Theresia	TV mini series	Roman Kariolou

=== 2016 ===
Production	Type	Music
Sisi – The Movie Trilogy Suite	Music Album	Anton Profes, Paul Hertel
Inferno	Film	Hans Zimmer
The Crown - Season 1	TV series	Rupert Gregson-Williams
Epilogue - Volvo V90	Commercial	Hans Zimmer
Ultimate Classix: The Hits	Music album	Lorne Balfe
