= Paramount Music =

American record label

- Parent company: Paramount Pictures
- Founded: 2015; 11 years ago
- Distributor: TuneCore
- Genre: Various, mainly soundtrack
- Country of origin: United States
- Location: 5555 Melrose Avenue, Hollywood, Los Angeles, California
- Official website: music.paramount.com

Paramount Music is an American record label. Since 2015, it has served as the in-house label for film and television music across all divisions of Paramount Pictures.

== Background ==
The label is distributed by TuneCore, and it is the second in-house label for Paramount Pictures. Paramount Records had earlier operated between 1969 and 1974, releasing soundtracks for Paramount properties, along with several non-film and television related albums by contemporary artists.

Paramount Music occasionally releases soundtracks for older Paramount titles, branded as "Paramount Classics" releases. So far, it has not released soundtracks for the titles Paramount acquired from DreamWorks Pictures, Miramax and Republic Pictures. However, it has done soundtracks for in-house sequels to films from those studios, including Gladiator II (whose predecessor was a DreamWorks film) and Scream VI (originally a Miramax franchise).

== Soundtracks ==
Artist	Album	Details
Franz Waxman	Sunset Boulevard (Music from the Motion Picture)	Released April 4, 2016
Lorne Balfe	Mission: Impossible – Fallout: Music from the Motion Picture	Released July 14, 2018
Dan Romer	Maniac (Music from the Netflix Limited Series)	Released September 21, 2018
The Newton Brothers	The Haunting of Hill House (Music from the Netflix Horror Series)	Released October 12, 2018
Ramin Djawadi	Tom Clancy's Jack Ryan: Season 1 (Music from the Prime Original Series)	Released October 31, 2018
Jed Kurzel	Overlord (Music from the Motion Picture)	Released November 9, 2018
Michael Andrews	Instant Family (Original Motion Picture Score)	Released November 16, 2018
Dario Marianelli	Bumblebee (Motion Picture Score)	Released December 21, 2018
Christopher Young	Pet Sematary (Music From the Motion Picture)	Released April 5, 2019
Max Aruj and Steffen Thum	Crawl (Music from the Motion Picture)	Released July 12, 2019
John Debney and Germaine Franco	Dora and the Lost City of Gold (Music from the Motion Picture)	Released August 9, 2019
Eskmo	13 Reasons Why: Season 3 (A Netflix Original Score)	Released August 23, 2019
Lorne Balfe	Gemini Man (Music From the Motion Picture)	Released October 11, 2019
Siddhartha Khosla	Looking For Alaska (Original Series Score)	Released October 18, 2019
Tom Holkenborg	Terminator: Dark Fate (Music From the Motion Picture)	Released November 1, 2019
Nathan Wang	Playing With Fire (Music From the Motion Picture)	Released November 8, 2019
Christophe Beck & Jake Monaco	Like a Boss (Music from the Motion Picture)	Released January 10, 2020
Tom Holkenborg	Sonic the Hedgehog (Music from the Motion Picture)	Released February 14, 2020
Nathan Lanier	Home Before Dark: Season 1 (Apple TV+ Original Series Soundtrack)	Released April 3, 2020
Atli Örvarsson, Theme by Ólafur Arnalds	Defending Jacob (Apple TV+ Limited Series Soundtrack)	Released April 24, 2020
Joseph Bishara	Body Cam (Music from the Motion Picture)	Released June 19, 2020
Joseph Trapanese	Spontaneous (Music from the Motion Picture)	Released September 25, 2020
The Newton Brothers	The Haunting of Bly Manor (Music from the Netflix Horror Series)	Released October 9, 2020
Marco Beltrami & Marcus Trumpp	Love and Monsters (Music from the Motion Picture)	Released October 16, 2020
Quincy G. Ledbetter	Alieu the Dreamer (Music from the Motion Picture)	Released October 23, 2020
Ben Onono	Spell (Music from the Motion Picture)	Released October 30, 2020
George Fenton	We're No Angels (Music from the Motion Picture)	Released December 4, 2020
Keefus Ciancia	Made For Love: Vol. 1 (Music from the Max Original Series)	Released April 2, 2021
Hans Zimmer & Steve Mazzaro	The SpongeBob Movie: Sponge On the Run (Music from the Motion Picture)	Released April 9, 2021
Keefus Ciancia	Made For Love: Vol. 2 (Music from the Max Original Series)	Released April 16, 2021
Jónsi	Without Remorse (Music from the Motion Picture)	Released April 30, 2021
Nathan Lanier	Home Before Dark: Season 2 (AppleTV+ Original Series Soundtrack)	Released June 11, 2021
Harry Gregson-Williams	Infinite (Music from the Motion Picture)	Released June 11, 2021
	First Wives Club (Music from the BET+ Original Series)	Released June 15, 2021
Martin Todsharow	Snake Eyes: G.I. Joe Origins (Music from the Motion Picture)	Released July 23, 2021
John Debney	Clifford: The Big Red Dog (Music from the Motion Picture)	Released November 12, 2021
Dimitri Tiomkin	It's a Wonderful Life (Music from the Motion Picture: 75th Anniversary Edition)	Released December 3, 2021
Lorne Balfe	Rumble (Music from the Motion Picture)	Released December 17, 2021
Dan Romer	Station Eleven (Music from the HBO Max Limited Series)	Released January 13, 2022
J.J. Pfeifer	The In Between (Music from the Motion Picture)	Released February 11, 2022
Tony Morales	Reacher (Music from the Amazon Original Series)	Released February 11, 2022
Pinar Toprak	The Lost City (Music from the Motion Picture)	Released March 25, 2022
Jerry Goldsmith	Star Trek: The Motion Picture – The Director's Edition (Music from the Motion Picture)	Released April 4, 2022
Tom Holkenborg	Sonic the Hedgehog 2 (Music from the Motion Picture)	Released April 8, 2022
Cheche Alara	The Lost City (EP) (Music from the Motion Picture)	Released April 15, 2022
Jermaine Stegall	Senior Year (Original Score from the Netflix Film)	Released May 13, 2022
The Newton Brothers	Joe Pickett: Season 1 (Music from the Original Series)	Released May 16, 2022
Keefus Ciancia	Made For Love: Season 2 (Music from the Max Original Series)	Released May 19, 2022
Isabella Summers	The Offer: Music from the Limited Series	Released July 1, 2021
John Frizzell	Mike Judge's Beavis and Butt-Head Do the Universe (Music from the Motion Picture)	Released July 8, 2022
Normand Corbeil	Double Jeopardy (Music from the Motion Picture)	Released September 30, 2022
Oliver Coates	Significant Other (Music from the Motion Picture)	Released October 7, 2022
Cristobal Tapia de Veer	Smile (Music from the Motion Picture)	Released November 18, 2022
Rolfe Kent	Election (Music from the Motion Picture)	Released February 10, 2023
John Debney	80 For Brady (Music from the Motion Picture)	Released February 17, 2023
Franz Waxman	A Place In The Sun (Music from the Motion Picture)	Released March 10, 2023
Brian Tyler and Sven Faulconer	Scream VI (Music from the Motion Picture)	Released March 10, 2023
Howard Shore	Fire With Fire (Music from the Motion Picture)	Released June 2, 2023
Craig DeLeon	Fatal Attraction (Music from the Paramount+ Original Series)	Released July 7, 2023
Mark Isham	Fire In the Sky (Music from the Motion Picture)	Released July 16, 2023
Trent Reznor & Atticus Ross	Teenage Mutant Ninja Turtles: Mutant Mayhem (Original Score)	Released July 28, 2023
Pinar Toprak	Paw Patrol: The Mighty Movie (Music from the Motion Picture)	Released September 29, 2023
Cliff Eidelman	Leap of Faith (Music from the Motion Picture)	Released October 6, 2023
Christopher Young	Jennifer 8 (Music from the Motion Picture)	Released October 6, 2023
Brandon Roberts	Pet Sematary: Bloodlines (Music from the Paramount+ Original Movie)	Released October 6, 2023
Cliff Eidelman	The Beautician and the Beast (Music from the Motion Picture)	Released October 26, 2023
Ramin Djawadi	Tom Clancy's Jack Ryan: Seasons 3 & 4 (Prime Video Original Series Soundtrack)	Released September 1, 2023
Tony Morales	Reacher: Season 2 (Prime Video Original Series Soundtrack)	Released December 15, 2023
Jeff Richmond, Nell Benjamin and Reneé Rapp	Mean Girls (Music from the Motion Picture)	Released January 12, 2024
Steve Jablonsky	The Tiger's Apprentice (Music from the Paramount+ Original Movie)	Released February 23, 2024
Tom Howe	Knuckles (Music from the Paramount+ Original Series)	Released April 26, 2024; co-release with Sony Classical
Michael Giacchino	IF (Music from the Motion Picture)	Released May 17, 2024
Alexis Grapsas	A Quiet Place: Day One (Music from the Motion Picture)	Released June 28, 2024
Brian Tyler	Transformers One (Music from the Motion Picture)	Released September 20, 2024
Adam Price and Peter Gregson	Apartment 7A (Music from the Paramount+ Original Movie)	Released September 27, 2024
Naomi Scott	Smile 2: The Skye Riley EP (Songs from the Motion Picture)	Released October 11, 2024; co-release with Interscope Records
Cristobal Tapia de Veer	Smile 2 (Music from the Motion Picture)	Released October 25, 2024
Harry Gregson-Williams	Gladiator II (Music from the Motion Picture)	Released November 15, 2024
Rupert Gregson-Williams	Dear Santa (Music from the Paramount+ Original Movie)	Released November 29, 2024
Lorne Balfe and Andrew Kawczynski	Novocaine (Music from the Motion Picture)	Released March 14, 2025
Max Aruj and Alfie Godfrey	Mission: Impossible – The Final Reckoning (Music from the Motion Picture)	Released May 23, 2025
Henry Jackman	Smurfs (Music from the Motion Picture)	Released July 18, 2025
Lorne Balfe	The Naked Gun (Music from the Motion Picture)	Released August 1, 2025
Tom Schraeder	Vicious (Music from the Paramount+ Original Movie)	Released October 10, 2025
Nate Walcott	Regretting You (Music from the Motion Picture)	Released October 24, 2025
Steven Price	The Running Man (Music from the Motion Picture)	Released November 14, 2025
Charles Bernstein	Cujo (Music from the Motion Picture)	Released December 5, 2025
John Debney	The SpongeBob Movie: Search for SquarePants (Music from the Motion Picture)	Released December 19, 2025; co-release with Milan Records
Adrian Johnston	Primate (Music from the Motion Picture)	Released January 9, 2026
Disasterpeace	Teenage Mutant Ninja Turtles: Chrome Alone 2 – Lost in New Jersey (Music from the Short Film)	Released January 16, 2026
Leo Birenberg and Zach Robinson	Street Fighter (Music from the Motion Picture)	Released October 16, 2026

== See also ==
- List of record labels
- CBS Records (2006)
- Comedy Central Records
- DreamWorks Records
- Famous Music
- Nickelodeon Records
- Paramount Records (1969)
