= Crawl (2019 film) =

American film by Alexandre Aja

- Theatrical release poster
- Directed by: Alexandre Aja
- Written by: Michael Rasmussen; Shawn Rasmussen
- Produced by: Craig Flores; Sam Raimi; Alexandre Aja
- Starring: Kaya Scodelario; Barry Pepper
- Cinematography: Maxime Alexandre
- Edited by: Elliot Greenberg
- Music by: Max Aruj; Steffen Thum
- Production companies: Raimi Productions; Fire Axe Pictures
- Distributed by: Paramount Pictures
- Release date: July 12, 2019
- Running time: 87 minutes
- Country: United States
- Language: English
- Budget: $13.5–15 million
- Box office: $91.5 million

Crawl is a 2019 American natural horror film directed by Alexandre Aja, who produced with Sam Raimi and Craig Flores. It stars Kaya Scodelario and Barry Pepper as a daughter and father who, along with their dog, find themselves trapped in the crawl space of their home and preyed upon by alligators during a Category 5 hurricane in Florida.

Aja rewrote the spec script from the Rasmussen brothers to expand upon the story's length and characters. The film was officially announced in May 2018, and production started that August in Serbia with cinematographer Maxime Alexandre. It was primarily shot within a warehouse facility in the Port of Belgrade and wrapped after 41 days. During post-production, Max Aruj and Steffen Thum composed the score, while Rodeo FX completed the visual effects in three months.

Distributed by Paramount Pictures, the film opted out of conventional press screenings before opening in the United States on July 12, 2019, to critical and commercial success. It received generally positive reviews for its action, direction, pacing, and visual effects, earning a nomination for Best Wide Release at the 2020 Fangoria Chainsaw Awards, and grossed $91 million on a $13.5–15 million production budget. A sequel is scheduled to be released in July 2027.

== Plot ==
University of Florida swimmer Haley Keller receives a call from her older sister Beth advising her to leave the state due to the imminent arrival of a Category 5 hurricane. Concerned for the safety of her estranged father Dave, Haley checks on him at his condo but finds it empty except for the family dog, Sugar. Against the instructions of Beth's ex-boyfriend Wayne, a Florida state trooper, she ignores evacuation orders and goes with Sugar to their old family home in Coral Lake, a location at risk of flooding.

Haley finds the house empty. She enters the crawl space under the house and finds her father mauled but alive. She attempts to drag him out but is stopped by a large American alligator. She and her father retreat back where she found him, in an area that the animal cannot enter, but she drops her phone. As the house begins to flood, she attempts to retrieve the phone but encounters a second gator that crushes it and injures her leg. She retreats back to the safe space. Peeping outside through holes in the wall, she sees three looters at a nearby gas station. She gets the attention of one, but then all three are attacked and devoured by alligators swimming in the rising floodwaters.

Wayne and his partner Pete arrive at the old house searching for Haley and Dave. Wayne enters the house, but Pete is ambushed and torn to pieces by the alligators. Wayne locates the crawl space. Haley and Dave warn him of the danger, but he is pulled in and devoured. In a last-ditch effort to escape, Haley swims to a storm drain, where she discovers the alligators have made their nest and laid eggs. An alligator attacks her, but she kills it with Wayne's gun.

With the floodwaters almost filling the crawl space, Haley swims out into the flooded street through the storm drain, enters the house, and uses a crowbar to make a hole in the living room floor, saving Dave. They take the dog and make their way to a boat outside as the hurricane's eye moves over the neighborhood. However, the floodwaters break the nearby levees and crash them back into the house, separating them.

As Dave and Sugar make their way up the stairs, an alligator attacks Dave and bites off his right forearm. Haley navigates around the kitchen and uses a police radio floating in the floodwater to call for rescue. An alligator closes on her, but she traps it in the bathroom's shower stall. While making her way to the attic, she is attacked by another alligator that attempts to kill her with a death roll. She stabs the alligator in the eye with a flare and all three reunite on the roof. After narrowly avoiding another alligator, they rest briefly on the roof just as a rescue helicopter flies overhead, having received Haley's call. She lights a flare and flags it down, turning her eyes on her father in triumph and relief as he proudly watches.

== Cast ==
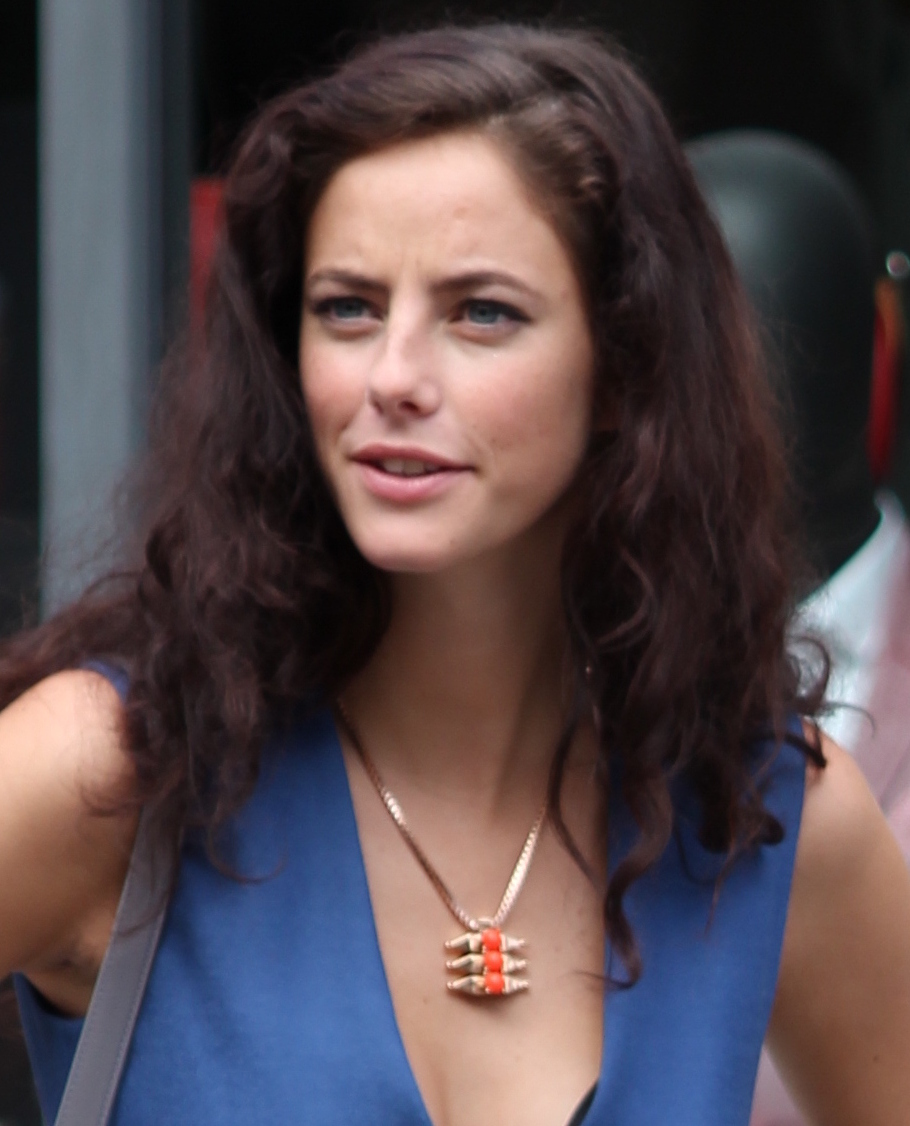
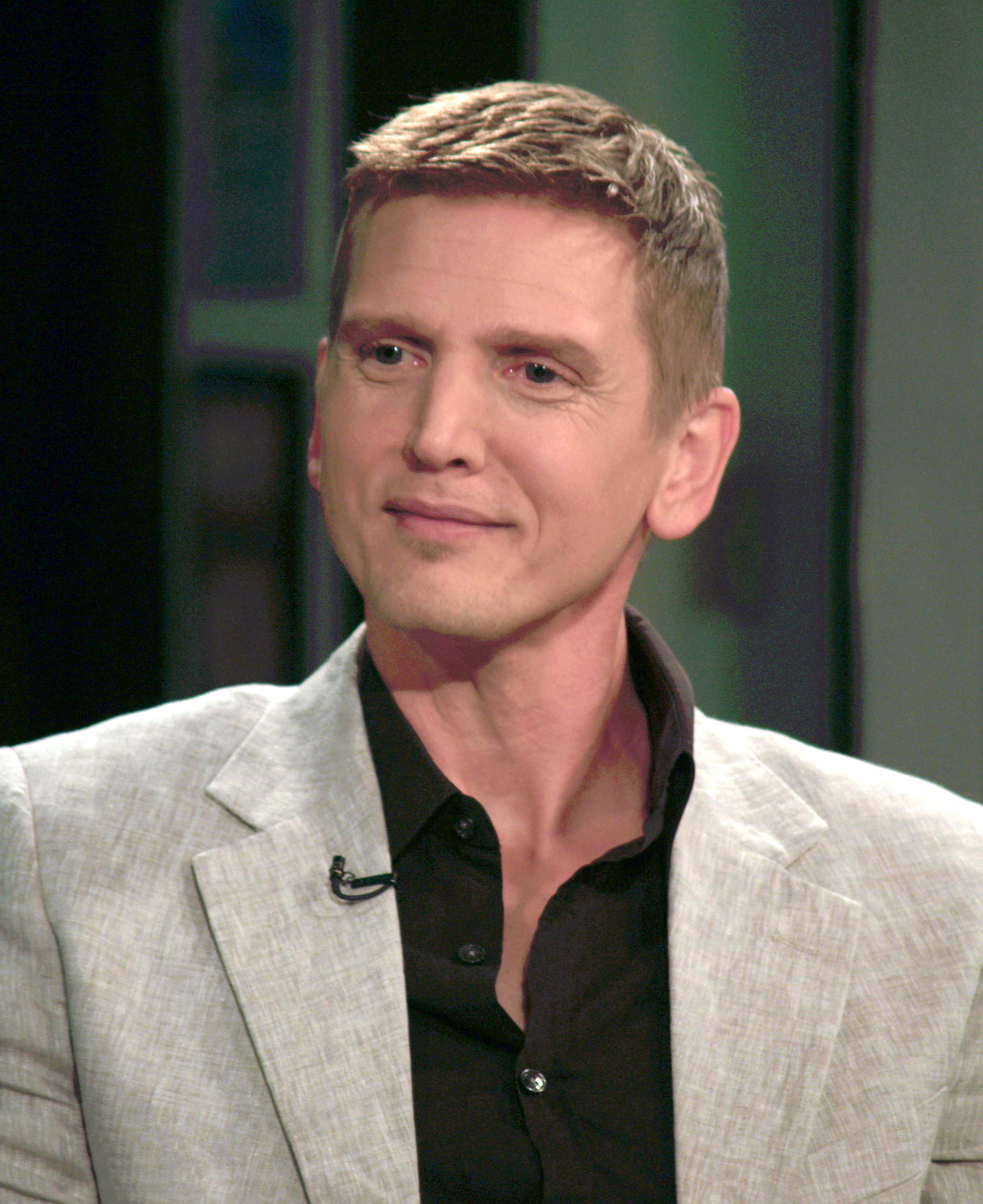
Kaya Scodelario (left) and Barry Pepper play father-and-daughter Haley and Dave Keller.
- Kaya Scodelario as Haley Keller, a University of Florida swimmer
- Barry Pepper as Dave Keller, Haley and Beth's father
- Morfydd Clark as Beth Keller, Haley's older sister
- Ross Anderson as Wayne Taylor, Beth's ex-boyfriend and a Florida state trooper
- Jose Palma as Pete Flores
- Colin McFarlane as The Governor
- George Somner as Marv
- Anson Boon as Stan
- Ami Metcalf as Lee
- Cso-Cso as Sugar, Dave's dog

== Production ==
=== Development ===
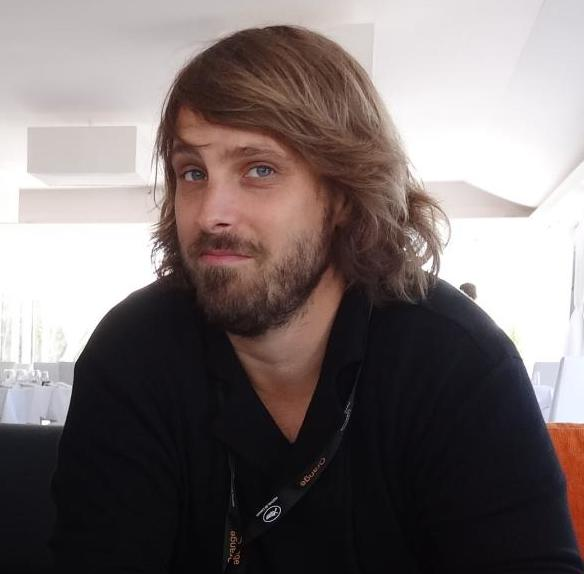
Director Alexandre Aja

Brothers Michael and Shawn Rasmussen wrote the film's spec script, which producer Craig Flores gave to French filmmaker Alexandre Aja in 2017. Aja was initially intrigued by the logline but became disappointed with the story's actual length, which took place in one location, the crawl space, and followed the characters as they were antagonized by a single alligator, with a second alligator appearing in the third act. He ultimately departed a James Wan–produced project to rewrite the script over a year to introduce new locations and expand the characters. He worked with Flores and Dana Stevens to improve the screenplay, making Haley Keller a skilled swimmer and her father Dave her former coach to make their journey and survival in the film realistic.

The scene where Haley goes against the instructions of several people to retrieve her father was influenced by a scene in Alfred Hitchcock's The Birds (1963). It was added in to highlight her determination and give audiences the "[feeling] that something is coming and building up" in an "old school" fashion. Aja aimed to put each character in the worst-case scenario possible so he rewrote the screenplay as a "home invasion movie" where the hurricane was an antagonist. He did extensive research on hurricanes and alligators and looked through "hundreds of hours" of real-world footage to find examples of both topics in their "ferocious" and "powerful" nature. The design of the alligators were based on a stuffed Mississippi alligator located at the American Museum of Natural History and a sheltered alligator in Miami nicknamed "Godzilla".

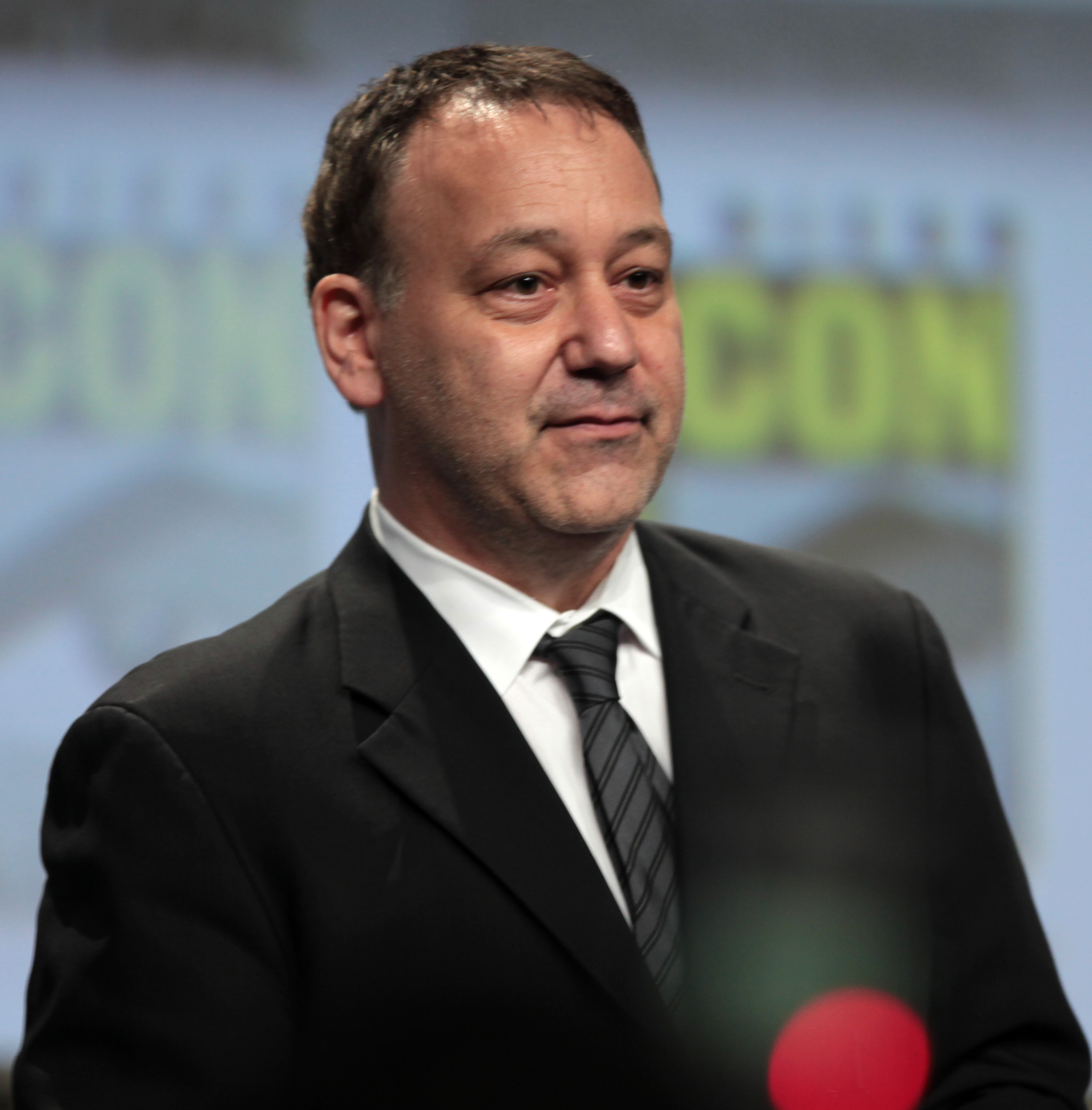
Producer Sam Raimi

On May 1, 2018, Paramount Pictures announced it had acquired the rights to the film, and described the antagonists as the "most savage and feared predators" in Florida. Aja, whose previous credits at the time included the horror films Piranha 3D (2010) and Horns (2013), came on board to direct the thriller produced by Flores and Sam Raimi. The project had previously been in development through Lakeshore Entertainment and Annapurna Pictures before moving to Paramount to benefit from the success of A Quiet Place (2018), another low-budget horror film from the studio. Aja listed the one-location styles of Alien (1979) and Cujo (1983) and the setting in Raimi's The Evil Dead (1981) as inspirations for the film. With Jaws (1975) serving as "the blueprint", Aja wanted the film to feel similar to riding a rollercoaster: suspenseful. Paramount agreed to keep the runtime short, and ultimately decided on 87 minutes. Aja went against the advice of multiple executives to introduce the alligators early on in the film, as he believed this would be unexpected to the general audience. One idea considered for the ending would have seen the main characters get eaten by an alligator. Aja also said there were several discussions on "whether the dog would live or not"; alternate scenarios involved an alligator biting the dog's tail off, the main characters feeding the dog to the alligators to escape their home, and the dog sacrificing itself to save its owners. The happy ending was picked to evoke a positive response from audiences.

=== Casting ===
Kaya Scodelario entered negotiations to star in May 2018. Paramount executive Wyck Godfrey gave her the chance to join the film in a leading role without having to audition. Accepting the part, she said she picked the film based on "the material and the character, and if it's going to empower me or teach me or test me." To physically prepare for the role, Scodelario was trained to swim by coaches from England and Serbia, including a former Olympian, who helped her for six to seven weeks at the London Aquatics Centre. Her training progressed from her having to swim in a kiddie pool with floaties to swimming at a "good speed and quite good stamina". Barry Pepper, having previously worked with Scodelario in 2015 on Maze Runner: The Scorch Trials, was added to the cast in June 2018. He also underwent months of training to improve his swimming, and said he enjoyed the idea of working on a film about a father-and-daughter relationship.

=== Design and filming ===
Crawl is the first Paramount film to be shot in the country of Serbia. Principal photography began in August 2018 and concluded in September after 41 days. Maxime Alexandre was the cinematographer. The majority of filming took place in the city of Belgrade, particularly on a set located in a warehouse facility for shipping containers in the Port of Belgrade. On July 30, 2018, days before production officially began, the set was visited by Serbian President Aleksandar Vučić and United States Ambassador to Serbia Kyle Randolph Scott. Vučić said he was "extremely glad" of the studio's decision to film in the country.

Using Arri Alexa cameras, including an Alexa SXT and an Alexa Mini, the film was shot with Leica Summilux-C lenses and Alura lightweight zooms on a Steadicam and a Technocrane. Within the facility, three soundstages were equipped, "the largest one for the exterior house and neighborhood, another for the house exterior and interiors, first and second floor—also used for underwater filming—and a third stage for the basement and roof scenes". Pepper mentioned that the warehouses used were the size of football fields and that the houses, gas stations, and trees were built on set.

Alan Gilmore was the film's production designer. To make the usage of water realistic, he watched several photo documentaries from New Orleans to research natural disasters and the effects a hurricane could have on houses without sustainable protection to make sure "it looks exactly right and causes the right damage and the right effects". For the main location, a house was constructed inside one of the warehouses and the production crew added a water tank they were able to fill to flood the house as filming progressed.

Overall, seven water tanks were built, of which two were filled simply to carry water, four were used for each section of the house, and a larger three-meter tall 60-meter by 80-meter tank was used for the neighborhood. According to the Serbia Film Commission, most of the film was shot after the house was flooded with the main water tanks, with 5 million liters of water being used on a daily basis. Scodelario found the shoot "the most physically demanding" of her career: "I was broken at the end of every day. We were shooting 16- to 18-hour days. I was on set all day, every day. I lost about 12 pounds shooting the movie, but I gained some of it in muscle, which I was quite impressed with. I broke a finger; I came home every day bruised, bloodied and cut open." She has spoken of how she "beefed up" her character as much as she could, eschewing makeup and playing most of the film in her bare feet, explaining: "I fought to have her barefoot [...] I didn't want protection on my feet. As a girl who's a swimmer, she's going to wear flip-flops and once she has to crawl around, she's going to kick them off." Additional filming took place in the United States, specifically around Tampa Bay in Tierra Verde, Lake Maggiore in St. Petersburg, and Thonotosassa, where exterior scenes and B-roll footage was shot. Scenes involving characters driving were shot in front of green screens, with some footage being filmed with stuntmen while actors were still in Belgrade.

Practical alligators, including the baby alligators, were created for a mere four to five takes in the film. To simulate the CGI alligators, scenes varied between Serbian stuntmen wearing green spandex suits, divers recreating alligator movements underwater, the director holding a pole attached to a pillow wrapped in green fabric, and actors reacting to fake alligator heads on sticks. Most of the weather elements seen in the film, including the wind and the rain, were provided on-set during filming, while the setting, trees, and hurricane itself were computer-generated. After filming concluded, the visual effects were handled during post-production for three months by Rodeo FX, supervised by Thomas Montminy Brodeur and Keith Kolder, who created a total 244 shots for the film.

== Music ==
The film score was produced by Lorne Balfe and composed by Max Aruj and Steffen Thum, who were involved in the project much later and composed the score within a month. The score was recorded at Synchron Stage Vienna. It was released on July 12, 2019, by Paramount Music, and on Vinyl LP by Rusted Wave on March 6, 2020.

== Marketing ==
The marketing campaign from Paramount Pictures for Crawl began on April 4, 2019, when initial footage was shown at CinemaCon. While /Film said the footage made the premise of the film feel similar to a "wacky sounding horror movie", Bloody Disgusting compared it to Burning Bright (2010), and Screen Rant wrote that they believed the film would have a "claustrophobic effect" on moviegoers. Early reactions compared the film to 47 Meters Down (2017) and Jaws.

On May 2, 2019, an official trailer for the feature film was released alongside the first theatrical release poster; the second poster was released two weeks later. With Chris Evangelista from /Film writing that it was "something I very much want to see", the footage from the trailer was compared to Deep Blue Sea (1999), Open Water (2003), Rogue (2007), Bait 3D (2012), and The Shallows (2016). From Syfy Wire, Josh Weiss compared the premise to the Florida Man internet meme and said that based on the trailer, Crawl would be able to compete with the Lake Placid film series, a franchise centered on crocodile horror films. Screen Rant journalist Cooper Hood wrote that the trailer "effectively conveys the thrills and sense of dread that it wants", and compared it to Don't Breathe (2016). Within a few hours of release, the trailer was watched by over a million viewers, which Entertainment Weekly credited to the "viral marketing" from Paramount, who had models, influencers, and celebrities, including several from Jersey Shore, Floribama Shore, and Siesta Key, share content from the film. In July 2019, Comic Book Resources went on to say the trailer "gave away the best scenes" without "kill[ing] any of the suspense". That same month, several clips and film stills were released; Brad Miska from Bloody Disgusting recommended viewers to avoid watching them before seeing the film.

In a marketing summary from Deadline Hollywood, Anthony D'Alessandro analyzed the reason Crawl, alongside Stuber, failed to generate the same buzz created by The Meg in 2018 and that year's Spider-Man: Far From Home and Toy Story 4. In his report, the reasoning was credited to the release of a single trailer, the appearance of digital advertisements only weeks before the film's release, and the social media campaign gaining 57 million views, below the average 82 million for horror films. Paramount opted for digital over television marketing, which would have cost $25 million.

== Release ==
=== Theatrical ===
Weeks prior to its release, the Crawl marketing crew opted out of conventional film screenings for critics and only had one during its campaign for promotional purposes. Its release to positive reviews named it "one of [the] most pleasant (and most terrifying) surprises" of 2019, and the "best 'not screened for film critics' movie in years".

In January 2019, Crawl was given a theatrical release date for later that year on August 23, to compete against the premieres of Angel Has Fallen and Overcomer. In March, the premiere date for the film was brought forward to July 12, 2019, this time to compete against The Farewell and Stuber. After the Motion Picture Association gave Crawl an "R" rating for "Bloody creature violence, and brief language," it was announced that the film would also be released in 4DX auditoriums.

=== Home media ===
Paramount Home Entertainment released Crawl via digital download on September 24, 2019, with a Blu-ray, DVD, and video on demand physical release on October 15. Special features, lasting 45 minutes, include a motion comic of an alternate opening scene involving a family being eaten by alligators, deleted and extended scenes, a compilation of scenes titled "Alligator Attacks", behind-the-scenes footage and featurettes, and interviews with the cast and crew.

== Reception ==
=== Box office ===
Crawl grossed $39 million in the United States and Canada, and $52.7 million in other territories, for a worldwide total of $91.7 million against a production budget of $13.5–15 million. Marketed as a counterprogramming option for moviegoers, the film's box office performance was seen as a commercial success.

The film premiered in the United States and Canada on July 12, in 3,170 theaters, where initial estimates predicted the feature would open with $10–14 million. In its four-day opening weekend, Crawl placed third at the box office and earned $12 million, following its earnings of $4.4 million on Friday, including $1 million from Thursday night previews, $4.3 million on Saturday, and $3.4 million on Sunday. Audiences were 64% above the age of 25, 60% between the ages of 18 and 34, and 51% male. Outside of the two countries, the film opened in theaters in 20 foreign markets, making $4.8 million in its first week, for a $16.8 million opening weekend worldwide.

In its second weekend in the United States and Canada, Crawl placed fourth at the box office, having fallen behind due to the release of The Lion King, and grossed $6 million for a $24 million total domestically after 10 days in release. That same week, the film made $2.7 million in 21 foreign markets. In its third weekend, Crawl moved to fifth place, due to the release of Once Upon a Time in Hollywood, and made $4 million. Outside of the two countries, the film grossed $3.4 million, for a $45 million total worldwide. In its fourth weekend, the film reached $53 million worldwide as eighth at the box office, before falling below the top ten list for the rest of its theatrical release.

=== Critical response ===
On review aggregator Rotten Tomatoes, the film holds an approval rating of 84% based on 211 reviews, with an average rating of 6.5/10. "An action-packed creature feature that's fast, terrifying, and benefits greatly from a completely game Kaya Scodelario, Crawl is a fun throw-back with just enough self-awareness to work." Metacritic, which uses a weighted average, assigned the film a score of 60 out of 100, based on 32 critics, indicating "mixed or average" reviews. Audiences polled by CinemaScore during its opening weekend gave the film an average grade of "B" on an A+ to F scale, while PostTrak reported audience members gave it an average rating of 2.5 out of 5 stars, with 46% saying they would definitely recommend it. Contemporary reviews of the film praised its suspense, brisk pacing, and visual presentation of its main antagonists. In a comparison with 2019's Godzilla: King of the Monsters, Daniel Menegaz from Entertainment Weekly shared positive feedback to Crawl's self-awareness, low runtime, and overall execution of its "simple" premise. Filmmaker Quentin Tarantino called it one of his favorite films of 2019.

Giving it a "B−", A.A. Dowd from The A.V. Club lauded the film for extensively using its "R" rating to increase its usage of gore. In his three-star and a half review for Rolling Stone, David Fear applauded the performances of the leads and Aja's directing. While Slate's Keith Phipps praised the action sequences and found its summer release to be adequate, Tomris Laffly from RogerEbert.com wrote that the film was engaging enough to please an audience. From the Chicago Tribune, Michael Phillips said that he "liked it pretty well" as a "pleasantly unpleasant" film. Furthermore, Vulture's Angelica Jade Bastién gave an entirely positive review, lending remarks to Scodelario's acting, Alexandre's cinematography, and premise that "more than delivers" as a "great example of a simple story exceedingly well-told".

Despite the generally positive reviews, several critics gave Crawl a mixed review. Writing for The New York Times, Jeannette Catsoulis criticized the film's screenplay while calling it an efficient popcorn movie. From The New Yorker, Richard Brody gave positive remarks to the jumpscares but found the visual effects to be unintentionally humorous. With Variety's Owen Gleiberman pillorying the realism of Haley's survival, IndieWire referred to the feature as an entertaining and suspenseful B movie, giving it a "C+". Meanwhile, The Guardian's Simran Hans and Clarisse Loughrey from The Independent both gave the film two stars out of five; the latter summarized it by writing that the film had "its bloody moments, with plenty of lingering shots of gaping wounds and protruding bones [but] just doesn't seem as gleeful in its carnage as the situation calls for".

Various journalists analyzed the presence of climate change in the film. From GQ, Noah Berlatsky wrote that the hurricane was the actual antagonist, opining that Crawl was set in an apocalyptic world where climate change was not resolved. Furthermore, Bustle magazine criticized the feature for having the hurricane "act as backdrop and excuse for something ludicrous as a giant alligator". Miles Howard, from Vice, found that Crawl was marketed to create "climate anxiety" in audiences with experiences with natural disasters such as Hurricane Katrina, writing that the film presented the hurricane as the representation of an "impending ecological collapse". Writing for Thrillist, Emma Stefansky said the film was thrilling enough to scare viewers but stated that "it's the looming menace of climate change and its consequences that ought to scare us the most". In November 2019, The Hill ranked Crawl as one of the top ten films of the year tackling climate change in an effective manner.

=== Accolades ===
At the 2020 Fangoria Chainsaw Awards, Crawl received a nomination for Best Wide Release. The film also earned a pair of nominations for Best Horror Film from the Hollywood Critics Association and IGN Awards, losing both to Us. At the 13th Houston Film Critics Society Awards, the feature received a nomination for Best Stunt Coordination Team, but lost to John Wick: Chapter 3 – Parabellum. The National Film & TV Awards nominated the film for Best Actress (Kaya Scodelario) and Best Producer (Alexandre Aja, Craig Flores, and Sam Raimi), losing both to Jennifer Lopez from Hustlers and Will Ferrell from Booksmart, respectively.

== Sequel ==
In July 2019, Aja said a potential sequel would focus on different characters in a new story. In October, he mentioned that the production crew had been developing "a few stories" for a future installment. Following its positive reception, Aja said he was "sure the question of a sequel [was] going to come up".

In April 2021, Aja revealed a screenplay was being written. In August 2024, Paramount officially greenlit Crawl 2, with Aja set to direct a script co-written by Andrew Deutschman and Jason Pagan. In August 2026, Mason Gooding and Emily Rudd were cast, and filming began in Hungary. The film is scheduled to be released on July 16, 2027.

== See also ==
- Crawl (soundtrack)
