= Vienna Symphonic Library =

Library of musical instrument samples

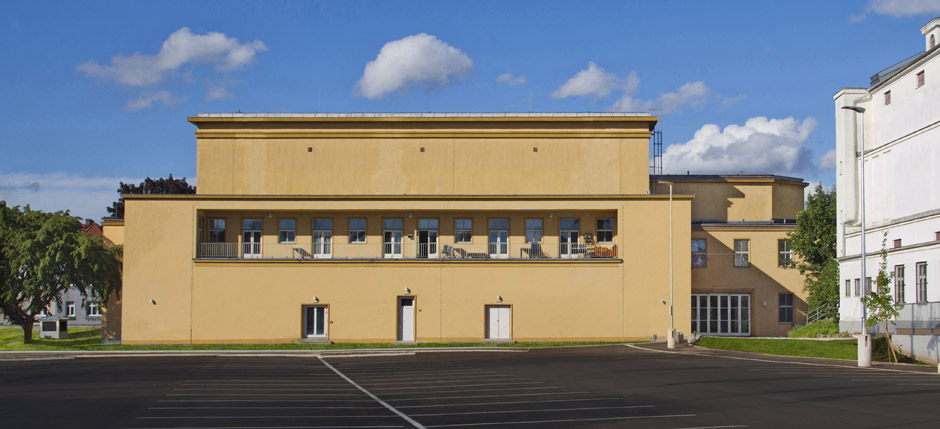
Headquarters of VSL at Synchron Stage Vienna

Vienna Symphonic Library GmbH (VSL) is a developer of sample libraries and music production software for classical orchestral music. The company is located in a landmark protected building, called Synchron Stage Vienna based in the Austrian capital's 23rd district.

The Vienna Symphonic Library provides virtual instruments and the digital recreation of the acoustics of famous concert halls such as the Konzerthaus and the Große Sendesaal at Austrian Public Radio ORF's broadcasting house, both in Vienna, and the Sage Gateshead concert hall in England. The technique used is impulse response resulting in an authentic digital convolution reverb. The virtual instruments are based on digital samples of solo voices and instruments as well as orchestral ensembles. The VSL software acts as an interface for the music composer to play the real instruments on a MIDI keyboard.

== History ==
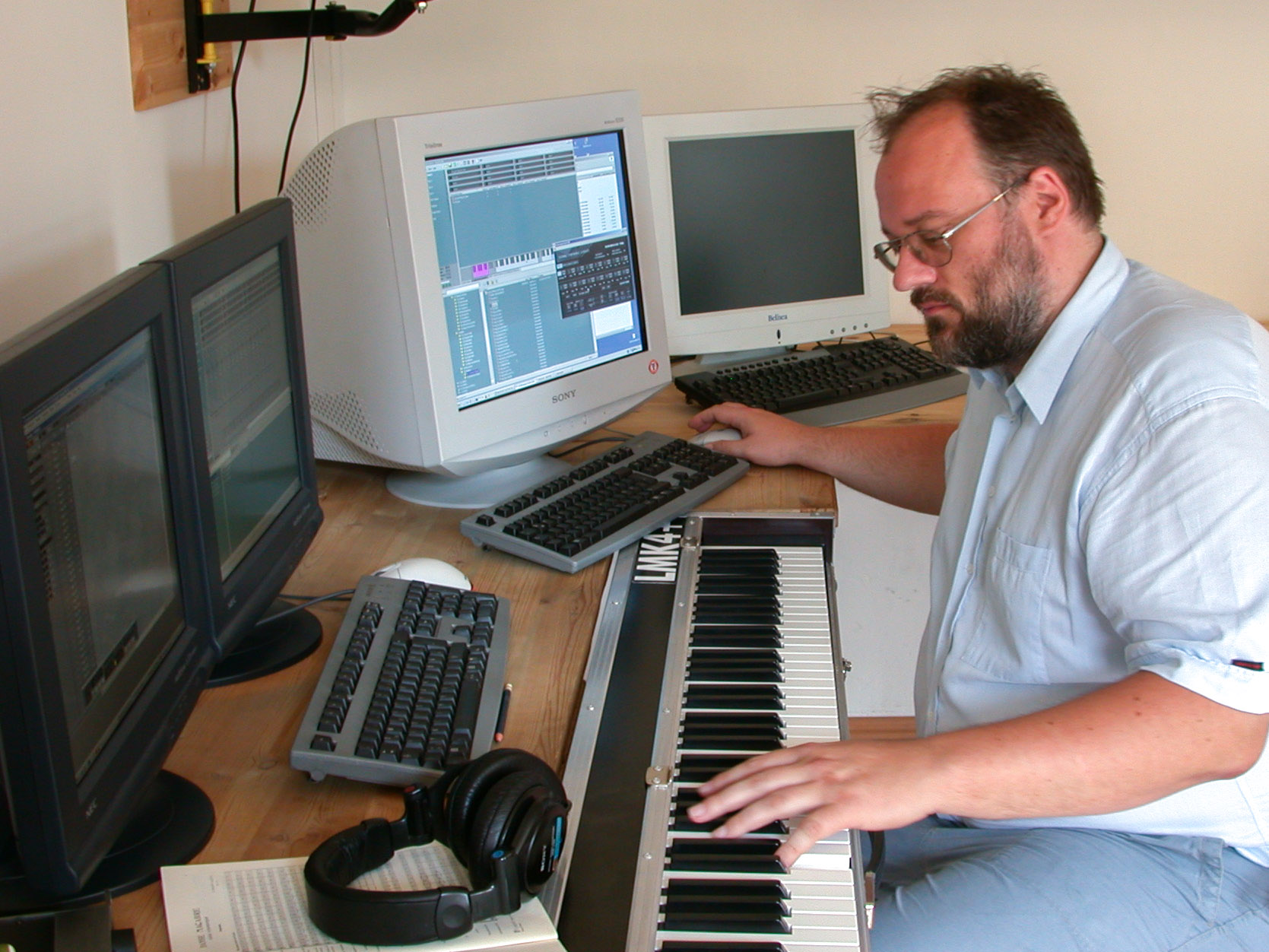
Herbert Tucmandl during first tests for the Vienna Symphonic Library.(2004) He used a Windows 2000-based workstation.

The company was founded in Vienna in October 2000 by Herbert "Herb" Tucmandl. In the 1990s, Tucmandl, a former cellist (as a substitute member with the Vienna Philharmonic, amongst others), later cameraman, director and composer used some of the available first-generation sample libraries for the creation of his own film scores. Because the sounds available at the time did not meet his requirements, he developed his own concept for an authentic-sounding sample library for orchestral music. His idea stood out for his approach of recording not only single notes but also tone combinations (e.g. legato) and tone repetitions. Through their combination, they allowed users lively interpretations for the first time. He tested his concept with the cello himself and convinced the investor Markus Kopf with the tonal results.

While the largest libraries at the time covered the entire orchestra with about 6,000 samples, Herb Tucmandl developed a structure for over a million individual notes and phrases.

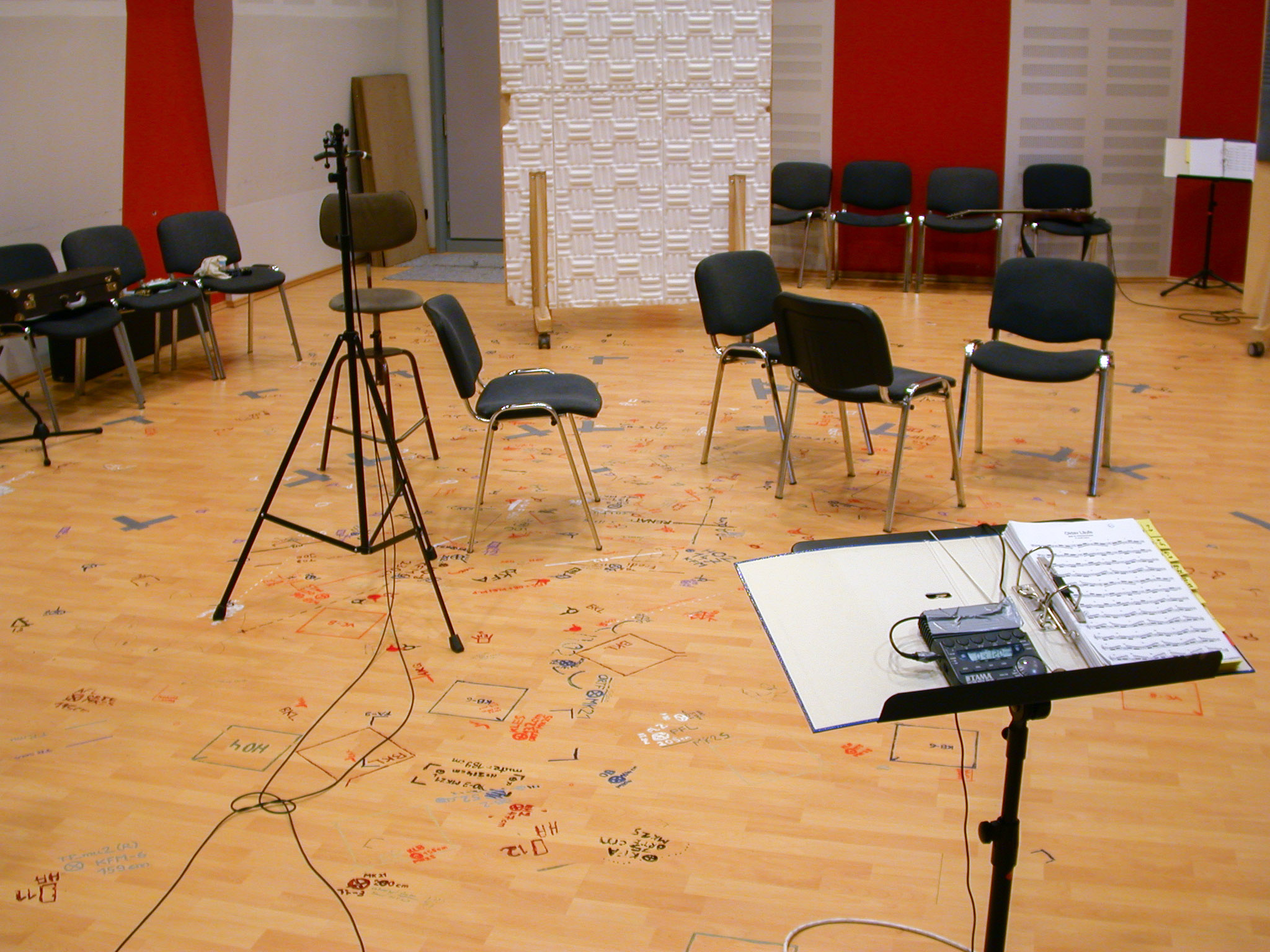
The specially built Silent Stage; the markings on the floor indicate the positions of the musicians. (2004)

=== Silent Stage ===
Since no existing recording studio could guarantee constant acoustic conditions for recording orchestral samples, the company designed and built a custom recording facility; the so-called Silent Stage. It was located in Ebreichsdorf, a village near Vienna, in Lower Austria. Until the end of 2016, Tucmandl invited singers, musicians, ensembles, orchestras there and samples were recorded almost daily under the artistic direction of Michael Hula. Tucmandl always played the cello himself.

=== Synchron Stage Vienna ===
In 2013, the Vienna Symphonic Library took over the historic, landmarked "Synchronhalle" on the grounds of the Rosenhügel film studios of the Austrian Broadcasting Corporation. The hall, which dates back to the 1940s, was converted into a globally unique music production facility, in collaboration with the renowned Walters-Storyk Design Group and architects Schneider+Schumacher. Completed in September 2015, the building features several recording and control rooms, editing studios, individual booths ("iso booths"), two instrument storage facilities with several pianos and concert grand pianos and approximately 300 percussion instruments, a sheet music archive, lounges, and offices and lounges for composers, producers, staff, and guests, totalling more than 2,000 square meters. The heart of the modern music production facility is the large recording hall, Stage A: with its 540 m^{2}, it can accommodate an orchestra of up to 130 people.

The first production at Synchron Stage Vienna in October 2015 was the recording of the film score of the famous Sissi trilogy. The score was long considered lost and had therefore never been released as a CD or download. The production was a historical bridge-building project: Back in 1955-1957, the original music for the three legendary films about Austria's Empress Elisabeth, which helped Romy Schneider to her international career, was recorded in what was then known as the "Synchronhalle." Based on the original manuscript by composer Anton Profes, Paul Hertel put together three suites which were recorded with the Synchron Stage Orchestra under Conrad Pope as conductor. Grammy Award winner Dennis Sands served as recording director.

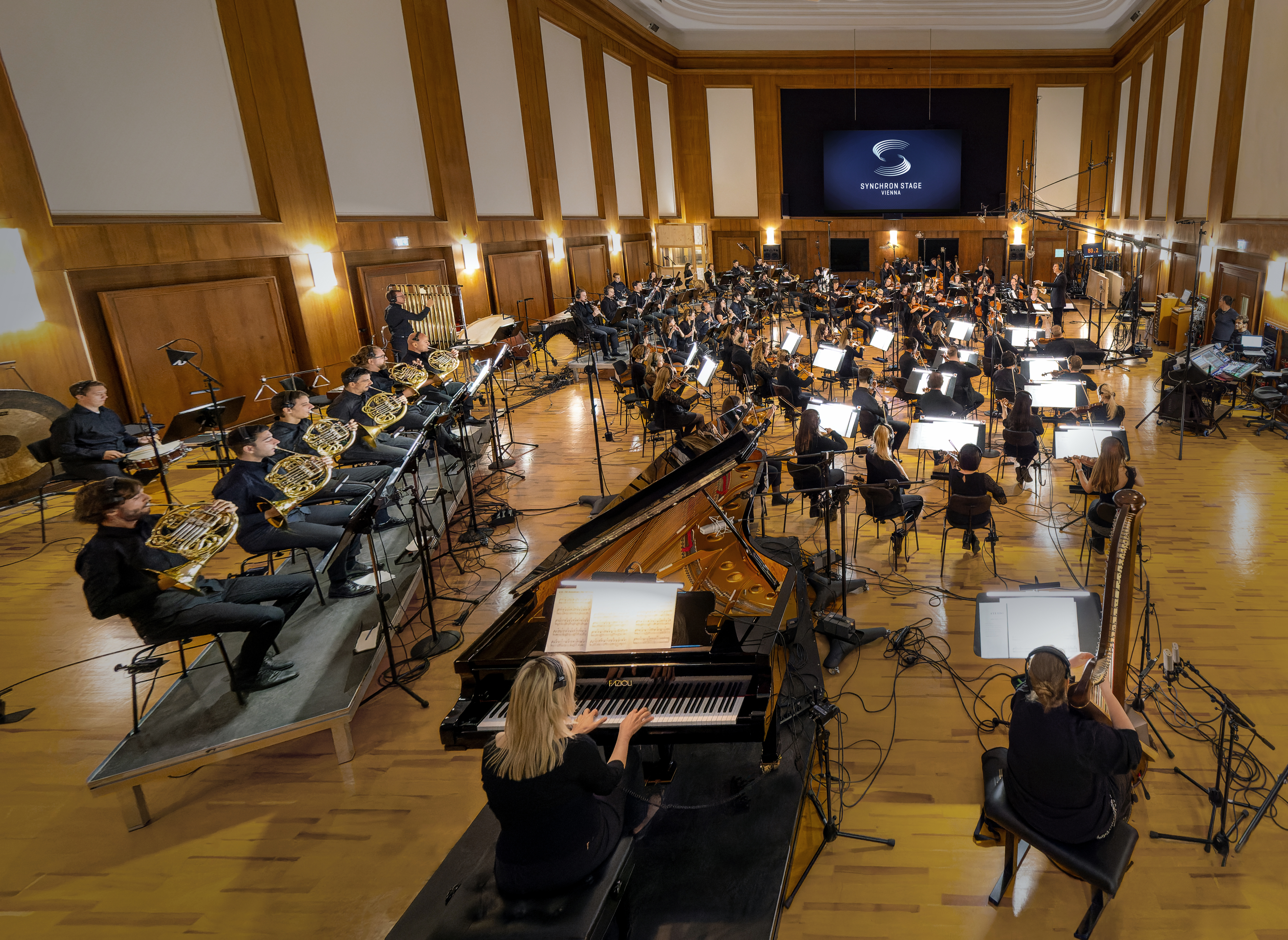
Recordings with the Synchron Stage Orchestra in the large recording hall "Stage A" of the Synchron Stage Vienna 2022.

In March 2016, the Vienna Symphonic Library business offices moved into the new recording facility at Synchron Stage Vienna. On July 15, 2016, Synchron Stage Vienna was officially opened. More than 200 people were invited to the opening ceremony to see the state-of-the-art recording facility. Hollywood stars such as Grammy winner Nan Schwartz and Joe Kraemer were on the guest list, as were ORF Director General Alexander Wrabetz, Justice Minister Wolfgang Brandstetter and VfGH President Gerhart Holzinger. Karl Markovics hosted the evening.

In addition to sampling sessions for the products of the Vienna Symphonic Library, music recordings for national and international film and television productions have been taking place regularly at Synchron Stage Vienna since 2016. Shortly after the official opening, Remote Control Productions, the production company of Hans Zimmer, had several projects recorded here. Since 2021, Synchron Stage Vienna has been an official Dolby Atmos studio and can provide stereo and surround as well as Auro-3D recordings.

→ Main page: Synchron Stage Vienna

== Product Overview ==
Vienna Symphonic Library's products range from individual instruments and instruments recorded in groups to software for composition, instrumentation and orchestration on the computer. The range is constantly being expanded and also includes recordings of choirs.

Music creators and studio owners worldwide use the products of the Vienna Symphonic Library: well-known TV and film music composers such as Hans Zimmer, Danny Elfman, A.R. Rahman, Alan Silvestri, Alexandre Desplat, James Newton Howard, Pinar Toprak use it to produce mock-ups of their orchestral scores and also combine the virtual-orchestral sounds in the final mix with live recordings of the actual orchestra. Pop musicians such as Lenny Kravitz, Beyoncé, and Justin Timberlake are also VSL users.

The first products were released in December 2002. The "First Edition" consisted of the modules "Strings", "Brass & Woodwinds", "Percussion" as well as the "Performance Set". In summer 2003, the "Pro Edition" followed with twice as many samples. Both editions were available in formats for the software samplers TASCAM GigaStudio and Apple Logic EXS24 (Emagic at that time). From late 2003, smaller packages of the "Horizon Series" followed. They were also available in formats for Steinberg HALion and Native Instruments Kontakt. The first small software development was the MIDI utility "Performance Tool", which allowed playing legatos and repetitions in real-time.

To manage the vast amount of samples more user-friendly, VSL developed a dedicated sample, the "Vienna Instruments" player. The "Vienna Instruments Collections", released from autumn 2005, contain the free player, which runs in the formats AU, VST, AAX Native and RTAS under Mac OS X and Windows. Further software developments followed: The network-ready mixing host "Vienna Ensemble PRO", the effects plug-in bundle "Vienna Suite", and the mixing and reverberation software "Vienna MIR PRO".

Since 2012, the sound libraries are no longer delivered on DVD but exclusively via download or data carriers (flash drive or hard disk).

With the release of the first library of the "Synchron" series in April 2017, the Vienna Symphonic Library became the first sample library in the world to offer its instrument library in Auro-3D in addition to stereo and surround.

The characteristic multi-microphone setup of the series increased the amount of data to be processed, which required the development of a new software player: the "Synchron Player" was equipped with a new audio engine and innovative algorithms to deliver the necessary performance.

== Sample Libraries ==
=== Vienna Instruments Series ===
The products of the "Vienna Instruments" series were recorded in the relatively dry environment of the Silent Stage. The only exception is the "Vienna Konzerthaus Organ", which was recorded in the famous Vienna Konzerthaus. With over 2.8 million samples included, it is by far the largest collection of orchestral sounds in the world. Since its introduction in late 2005, the series has been among the most powerful virtual instruments in the world. It offers intelligent performance algorithms under the user interface of easy-to-use VST/AU/AAX plug-ins. The amount of managed samples allows music creators to authentically reproduce almost any sonic nuance of an instrument or ensemble.

All products of the "Vienna Instruments" series are offered as Standard and Full Library. The differences lie in the number of included articulations.

=== Synchron Series ===
With the move to Synchron Stage Vienna, the new "Synchron" series was launched. All products in the series are recorded with a multi-microphone set up to capture the sonic character of individual instruments and their natural surround sound. Up to nine separate, phase-coherent microphone arrangements are used: microphones with medium to small distance to the sampled instrument and Decca tree und surround microphones. Depending on the sampled product, additional microphones such as condenser, ribbon, or ribbon room microphones are used. All microphone signals are available separately in the specially developed "Synchron Player".

Due to the many microphone positions, the "Synchron" products support all possible audio formats, from stereo to surround to immersive surround sound. With the release of the first "Synchron" library, "Synchron Percussion I", in April 2017, the Vienna Symphonic Library was the first sample library worldwide to offer its instrument library in Auro-3D in addition to stereo and surround.

All products of the "Synchron" series are offered as Standard and as Full Library. Both variants contain the same articulations but differ in the available number of microphone positions.

==== Big Bang Orchestra ====
The "Big Bang Orchestra" series was a premiere for the Vienna Symphonic Library, as it was the first time that the entire Synchron Stage Orchestra (or some ensembles and choir) was recorded playing together ("tutti"). The multi-microphone setup was also used, which presented a logistical and acoustic challenge in the crowded recording hall. The "Big Bang Orchestra" products mapped the entire alphabet with all product names based on astrological objects and phenomena.

The last library of the series was recorded in spring 2021 with the Gumpoldskirchner Spatzen: Before, the VSL community was asked for the first time, and they voted for producing a children's choir in the poll. With the release of "BBO: Ymir - Children's Choir" in May 2021, the "Big Bang Orchestra" series was concluded, a year and a half after the start of production.

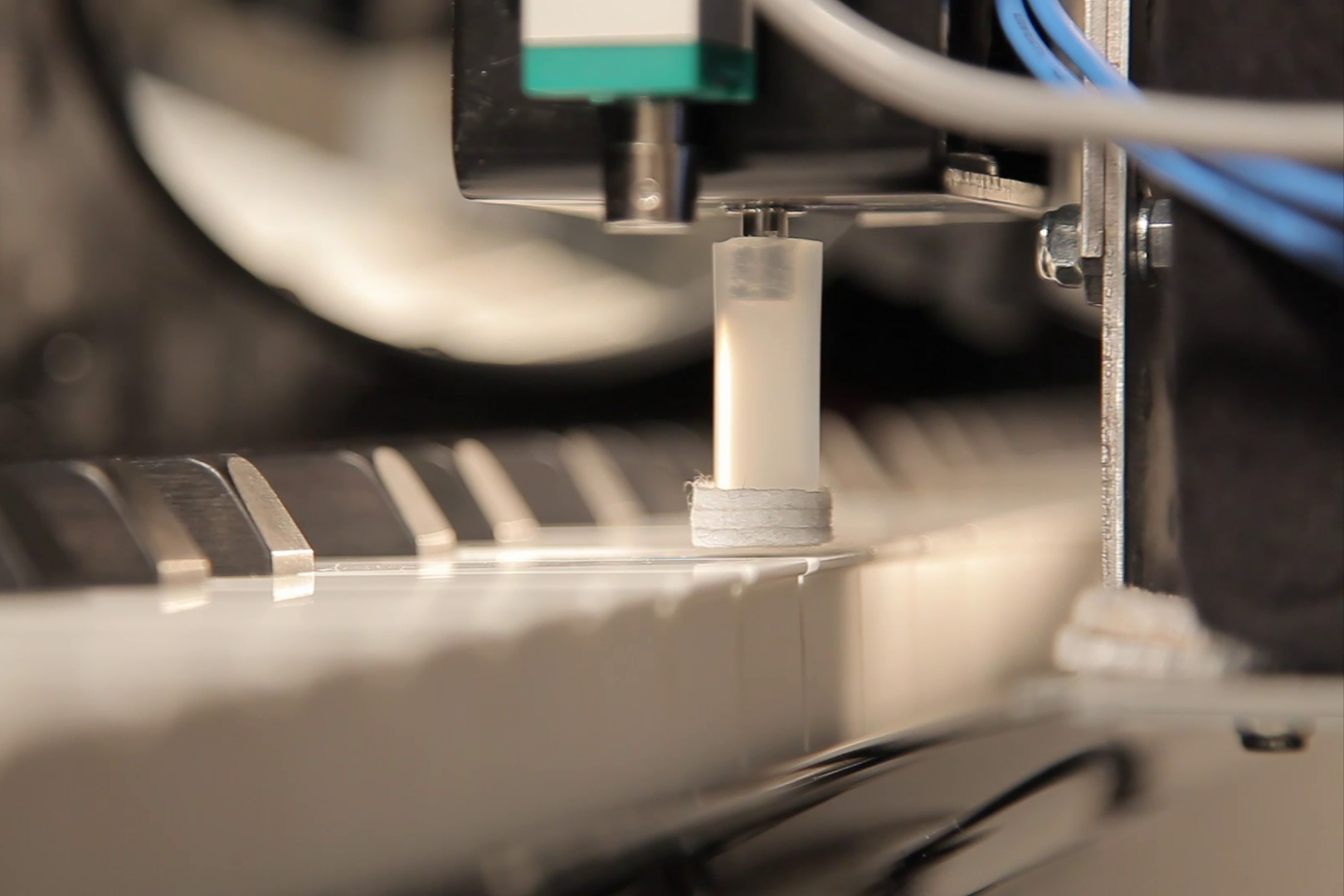
The self-developed "Piano Robot" of the Vienna Symphonic Library.

==== Synchron Pianos ====
The pianos represent a separate subgroup within the "Synchron" series. As of the end of 2022, eight "Synchron" pianos are offered: The Bösendorfer 290 Imperial, Blüthner 1895, Yamaha CFX, Steinway & Sons D-274, Bösendorfer 280VC, Fazioli F308 concert grand pianos, and the Bösendorfer Grand Upright 130 and "German Upright 1904", a C. Bechstein pian from 1904. Some of the pianos were sampled in Stage B, the smaller recording room at Synchron Stage Vienna. A multi-microphone setup was also used. VSL has developed a unique "piano robot" for its piano samplings.

== Software ==
The Vienna Symphonic Library offers various software for digital audio production. Some of these can be used with third-party plug-ins.

=== Vienna Ensemble Pro ===
Vienna Ensemble Pro is a software solution developed by the Vienna Symphonic Library for hosting virtual instruments and audio plug-ins in professional music production environments. It allows users to distribute processing loads across multiple computers connected via standard Ethernet, eliminating the need for dedicated MIDI or audio interfaces. The software supports both VST and AU formats and is compatible with macOS and Microsoft Windows.

Vienna Ensemble Pro includes functionality for parameter automation, surround audio configurations, and project handling features such as a mode that preserves instrument states across sessions. It is used in music production contexts that involve large sample libraries and complex routing setups like film score production, orchestral mock-ups, and other large-scale audio projects.

== See also ==
- Michael Cooper: A Digital Orchestra for Opera? Purists Take (and Play) Offense in The New York Times, June 11, 2014
- Jacob Hale Russell, John Jurgensen: Fugue for Man & Machine, Wall Street Journal, May 5, 2007
- A roundup of the company's history in the German Recording magazine, May 2012
