= Warning Shot (2018 film) =

2018 film directed by Dustin Fairbanks

- Film poster
- Directed by: Dustin Fairbanks
- Written by: Breanne Mattson
- Produced by: Aimee Ng; Spero Dean Stamboulis
- Starring: Tammy Blanchard; Guillermo Díaz; David Spade; Frank Whaley; Dwight Henry; Onata Aprile; Bruce Dern; James Earl Jones; Steve Eastin; Niki Koss
- Cinematography: Tiago Mesquita
- Edited by: R. Michael McWhorter
- Music by: Max Aruj; Steffen Thum
- Release date: September 14, 2018
- Running time: 87 minutes

Warning Shot is a 2018 American drama thriller directed by Dustin Fairbanks and written by Breanne Mattson. The film tells the story of a single mother (Tammy Blanchard) and her young daughter (Onata Aprile) held hostage at an isolated farmhouse by two men (Guillermo Díaz and Dwight Henry) sent by the grandson (David Spade) of an old family business rival to coerce them into giving up valuable water rights.

The film premiered at the Writers Guild Theater in Beverly Hills, California on September 6, 2018, and was released both theatrically and on VOD on September 14, 2018.

== Plot ==
Single mother Audrey and her young daughter Cheyenne attend the funeral of Audrey's grandfather. Struggling to make ends meet as a waitress, Audrey considers moving into her grandfather's old farmhouse if it is left to her in his will.

Meanwhile, Bobby, the principal of a powerful water company, unaware Audrey's grandfather has died, hires Rainy and Jawari to intimidate him into signing over the valuable water rights to a large creek on his property.

Bobby tries to assure his grandfather Calvin that he is capable of running the family business, but Calvin degrades him. Sickly and nearing the end of his life, Calvin has lost interest in business affairs, instead spending his remaining moments reminiscing about his past struggles and pondering regrets.

At the farmhouse, Rainy and Jawari confront Audrey and Cheyenne, who are merely visiting in anticipation of possible future ownership. Unsure what to do, Rainy and Jawari decide to hold them hostage until Bobby arrives with legal documents to transfer ownership of the water rights.

While Jawari is an amiable local drug dealer, Rainy exhibits sadistic tendencies, incessantly provoking reactions from Audrey, Cheyenne, and even Jawari. At first Audrey goes along, hoping she and Cheyenne will eventually be set free. It soon becomes clear, however, that Rainy intends to escalate the situation. He forces Audrey to choose between herself and Cheyenne, but Audrey's protective instincts cause her to quickly offer herself in Cheyenne's place, a characteristic that increasingly aggravates Rainy.

Audrey gets a brief reprieve when a door to door proselytizer named David arrives and draws Rainy's fixation. Now with three hostages and the situation destabilizing, Audrey tries to delay in any way she can, whether by appealing to Jawari or divulging intimate details of her life to Rainy.

Rainy continues to single out individuals and provoke them, eventually murdering Jawari to prevent his interference. With Audrey too quick to sacrifice herself for Cheyenne, Rainy attempts to force David to make a life or death decision, convinced his religious convictions are false and he would never sacrifice himself for strangers. Rainy is frustrated in this endeavor as well when David, moved by Audrey's selflessness, finds the inner strength to choose himself to be shot instead of Audrey or Cheyenne.

When Cheyenne grabs Jawari's gun, Audrey is left with no alternative but to attack Rainy. In the ensuing struggle, David gets Jawari's gun. By the time Bobby arrives the entire situation is completely out of control. He attempts to resolve the circumstances only to have Audrey, perhaps pushed beyond her coping ability, violently retaliate.

At the reading of the will, Audrey learns her grandfather's water rights have already gone into forfeiture, thus negating the entire purpose for the extortion plot and rendering all the violence following from it unnecessary. The film ends with a stunned Audrey lamenting, “All they had to do was ask.”

== Cast ==
- Tammy Blanchard as Audrey
- Guillermo Díaz as Rainy
- David Spade as Bobby
- Frank Whaley as David
- Dwight Henry as Jawari
- Onata Aprile as Cheyenne
- Bruce Dern as Calvin
- James Earl Jones as Mr. Pendleton
- Steve Eastin as Marty
- Niki Koss as Notta Chance

== Production ==
The film was shot primarily in and around Corsicana, Texas, in May and June 2016 with some scenes shot in Los Angeles and New York. The film was produced by Spero Dean Stamboulis and Aimee Ng.

The film's executive producers were Aimee Ng, Andrew K. Lo, and Geronimo Frias.

== Release ==
The film was released both theatrically and on VOD on September 14, 2018.
