= Slingshot (2024 film) =

American film by Mikael Håfström

- Theatrical release poster
- Directed by: Mikael Håfström
- Written by: R. Scott Adams; Nathan Parker
- Produced by: Richard Saperstein; Istvan Major; Beau Turpin
- Starring: Casey Affleck; Laurence Fishburne; Emily Beecham; Tomer Capone; David Morrissey; Mark Ebulué
- Cinematography: Pär M Ekberg
- Edited by: Rickard Krantz
- Music by: Steffen Thum
- Production companies: Astral Pictures; Bluestone Entertainment; Széchenyi Funds; Filmsquad
- Distributed by: Bleecker Street
- Release date: August 30, 2024
- Running time: 108 minutes
- Country: United States
- Language: English
- Box office: $818,279

Slingshot is a 2024 American science fiction psychological thriller film directed by Mikael Håfström and written by R. Scott Adams and Nathan Parker. It stars Casey Affleck, Laurence Fishburne, Emily Beecham, Tomer Kapon, and David Morrissey.

The film was released on August 30, 2024, and received mixed reviews from critics.

== Plot ==
Aboard Odyssey 1, a spacecraft on a long-term mission to Titan, Saturn's largest moon, a three-person crew is tasked with extracting and transporting vital resources such as methane back to Earth. To endure the multi-year journey, the astronaut John (portrayed by Casey Affleck), Captain Franks (portrayed by Laurence Fishburne) and aeronautics expert Nash (portrayed by Tomer Kapon) undergo repeated cycles of hibernation, waking every 90 days for system checks, maintenance, and brief communication with Earth before returning to stasis.

During one of these cycles, a critical malfunction is detected, triggering Nash's growing paranoia. Convinced the ship is compromised, he insists they must abort the mission, but Captain Franks refuses to change course. As tensions escalate, Nash's behavior grows increasingly erratic, and John begins to doubt the true condition of the ship and their chances of survival. The crew's trust begins to fracture as they face the possibility that something is terribly wrong— but the nature of the danger remains unclear.

As the mission progresses, John begins experiencing vivid and disturbing hallucinations and his grip on reality begins to falter. Meanwhile, Nash's mental state deteriorates further, and strange, inexplicable occurrences plague the spacecraft, deepening John's paranoia. John begins hallucinating conversations with the ground crew on Earth through the ship's handheld radios. He comes to believe that the other members of the crew do not exist, and that they are hallucinations caused by an overdose of the drugs used for hibernation.

Believing that the mission was actually a test and that the ship is deep underground, John chooses to exit through the airlock to return to the surface in spite of warnings from Franks. As he is shown in the process of being rescued, the movie cuts to John being thrown out of the airlock. The movie is ambiguous as to whether or not John is correct these revelations and whether he truly dies at the end.

== Cast ==
- Casey Affleck as John
- Laurence Fishburne as Captain Franks
- Emily Beecham as Zoe
- Tomer Capone as Nash
- David Morrissey as Napier
- Mark Ebulué as Gordon

== Production and release ==
On November 23, 2021, it was announced that Mikael Håfström would direct from a screenplay by R. Scott Adams and Nathan Parker. The film was produced by Bluestone Entertainment. Barry Chusid was the production designer and Pär M Ekberg was the cinematographer. Alongside the film announcement, Casey Affleck, Laurence Fishburne, Emily Beecham, Tomer Capone, David Morrissey, and Mark Ebulué were cast. Chelsea Ellis Bloch and Marisol Roncali were the casting directors. Filming began on December 1, 2021, at Korda Studios and other locations in Budapest, Hungary. The score was composed by Steffen Thum and produced by Lorne Balfe.

In February 2024, Bleecker Street acquired U.S. distribution rights to the film. The film was released on August 30, 2024, in the United States, opening on the four-day Labor Day weekend.

== Reception ==
=== Performance ===
In the United States and Canada, Slingshot was released alongside Afraid, 1992, Reagan, and City of Dreams, and was projected to gross $2.5 million at most from 845 theaters in its opening weekend. The film debuted below expectations, grossing $589,146 over the four-day Labor Day weekend.

On January 18, 2025, Slingshot overtook Top Gun: Maverick at the top of the Paramount+ streaming chart.

=== Critical response ===
On the review aggregator website Rotten Tomatoes, 39% of 57 critics' reviews are positive, with an average rating of 5.3/10. The website's consensus reads: "Casey Affleck's gripping performance can't save this Slingshot as it propels itself to nowhere." Metacritic, which uses a weighted average, assigned the film a score of 50 out of 100, based on 14 critics, indicating "mixed or average" reviews.

== See also ==
- Cliffhanger
