= Steve Eastin =

American actor (born 1948)

- Born: June 22, 1948 (age 78); Colorado, U.S.
- Education: University of Northern Colorado (BA)
- Occupations: Actor; acting teacher; author

Steve Eastin (born June 22, 1948) is an American actor, acting teacher and author. He has appeared in more than 300 television, film and stage roles throughout his career.

== Early life and education ==
Eastin was born in Colorado, where he began to study acting at the young age of six at his local theater. He received his Actor Equity card at age 16 when he performed in two musicals choreographed by Micheal Bennet. Later, he attended the University of Northern Colorado, where he appeared in several productions at the Little Theater of the Rockies, whose alumni include Nick Nolte.

After college, Eastin received a fellowship to teach at the University of Arizona, where he appeared in his first SAG role opposite Clint Eastwood in Joe Kidd. Eastin moved to Los Angeles to further pursue his acting career, enrolling in the Charles Conrad Studio upon arrival in 1974.

== Career ==
While attending Charles' class, Eastin became interested in teaching acting as well. In 1991, he founded his own acting school, the Steve Eastin Studio. The studio teaches what Eastin refers to as "Choiceless awareness", where the actors do not read into the script, nor prepare their "beats" or think about what or how they may read their lines.

Eastin is best known for appearing in such films as Field of Dreams (1989), Con Air (1997) and A Man Apart (2003). He played opposite Leonardo DiCaprio in two pivotal scenes in Catch Me if You Can (2002).

Eastin is also known for his numerous television appearances, including on Little House on the Prairie, CHiPS, T.J. Hooker, X-Files, St. Elsewhere and L.A. Law.

== Filmography ==
=== Film ===
Year	Title	Role	Notes
1972	Joe Kidd	Rider	Uncredited
1980	Cloud Dancer	Guy	
1980	A Change of Seasons	Lance	
1981	The Devil and Max Devlin	Larry Binder	
1981	Butcher, Baker, Nightmare Maker	Tom Landers	
1985	Gotcha!	CIA Agent	
1985	A Nightmare on Elm Street 2: Freddy's Revenge	Policeman	
1987	The Hidden	Agent Stadt	
1989	Field of Dreams	Eddie Cicotte	
1993	Blood In Blood Out	Hollenbeck Captain	
1993	Robot Wars	Boles	
1993	Sliver	Det. Phillip	
1994	Wagons East	Bartender	
1994	The Scout	Clubhouse Manager	
1995	Last Man Standing	Lt. Darnell Seagrove	Direct-to-video
1996	The Sweeper	Richard	Direct-to-video
1996	Ed	Shark's Manager	
1997	Con Air	Guard Falzon	
1998	Little Bigfoot 2: The Journey Home	Cavendish	
1999	Diplomatic Siege	Bates	
1999	Austin Powers: The Spy Who Shagged Me	Umpire	
1999	Stealth Fighter	Captain Thomson	
2000	Agent Red	Captain Russert	
2000	Peril	Detective Marks	Direct-to-video
2002	Catch Me If You Can	Paul Morgan	
2003	A Man Apart	Ty Frost	
2003	Matchstick Men	Mr. Schaffer	
2003	The Commission	J. Edgar Hoover	
2004	Shallow Ground	Detective Russell	
2005	Crash Landing	Detective Cobb	
2006	When a Stranger Calls	Detective Hines	
2006	The Black Dahlia	Detective	
2007	Rails & Ties	N.B. Garcia	
2007	Hollywood Dot Com	Shane	
2008	The Coverup	Chief Wilson	
2009	Up in the Air	Samuels	
2011	All Things Fall Apart	Coach Harper	
2012	Clean Ops the Chronicles of V	The Man	
2013	Watercolor Postcards	Morgan	
2014	Locker 13	Doc Herman	
2018	Warning Shot	Marty	
2023	Killers of the Flower Moon	Judge Pollock	

=== Television ===
Year	Title	Role	Notes
1974	Night Games	Airline Officer	Television film
1974–1976	Petrocelli	Various roles	7 episodes
1976	Wonder Woman	Johnny	Episode: "I Do, I Do"
1977	Little House on the Prairie	Shell game barker	Episode: "Meet Me at the Fair"
1977	Mulligan's Stew	Ranger	Episode: "Ah, Wilderness"
1977	The Waltons	Airman	Episode: "The Milestone"
1978	The Six Million Dollar Man	Ritter	Episode: "Walk a Deadly Wing"
1978	ABC Afterschool Special	Doctor	Episode: "It's a Mile from Here to Glory"
1978	Happily Ever After	First Workman	Television film
1978	The Clone Master	Huberman	Television film
1979	Crisis in Mid-Air	Jamieson	Television film
1979	CHiPs	Peter Dunslay	Episode: "Return of the Supercycle"
1980	Trouble in High Timber Country	Bob Eston	Television film
1981	The Patricia Neal Story	Frank Gilroy	Television film
1984	AfterMASH	Patient	Episode: "Chief of Staff"
1984	T. J. Hooker	Pete Tebbetts	Episode: "Psychic Terror"
1984	The Cowboy and the Ballerina	FBI agent	Television film
1984	St. Elsewhere	Detective Thibideaux	Episode: "Breathless"
1984	Silence of the Heart	Ed Rintal	Television film
1984, 1987	Scarecrow and Mrs. King	Senator Castleton / Douglas Harriman	2 episodes
1985	Heart of a Champion: The Ray Mancini Story	Male Reporter	Television film
1985	Streets of Justice	Public Relations officer	Television film
1985	The A-Team	Taylor	Episode: "There Goes the Neighborhood"
1985	Hill Street Blues	Harry Steel	Episode: "What Are Friends for?"
1985	Alfred Hitchcock Presents	Police Captain	Episode: "Prisoners"
1985–1989	Days of Our Lives	Col. Alfred Jericho / Ralph / Construction Foreman	45 episodes
1986	Crazy Like a Fox	Kirk Stoner	Episode: "Hearing Is Believing"
1986	The Colbys	Mahoney	Episode: "The Turning Point"
1986	Acceptable Risk	Jerry Haywood	Television film
1986	MacGyver	Tony	Episode: "Twice Stung"
1987	Sister Margaret and the Saturday Night Ladies	McFarlane	Television film
1987	Moonlighting	Bakery Clerk	Episode: "Blonde on Blonde"
1987	Cagney & Lacey	Bartender	Episode: "Turn, Turn, Turn: Part 1"
1987	Starmania	Foreman	Episode: "Starscape: Part 1"
1987	Buck James	Robert Lee Connors	Episode: "Sins of the Father"
1988	The Hogan Family	Plainclothes Cop	Episode: "Animal House"
1989	Life Goes On	Gary Scolassi	3 episodes
1989	Desperado: Badlands Justice	Ledon	Television film
1990	By Dawn's Early Light	Smitty	Television film
1990	Falcon Crest	Lieutenant Thayne	Episode: "Danny's Song"
1990	Nightmare on the 13th Floor	Hotel Doorman	Television film
1990	Matlock	Steve Miller	Episode: "The Biker"
1990–1991	Equal Justice	Detective Dankowski	5 episodes
1991	The New Adam 12	Mr. Harden	Episode: "Crack House"
1991	FBI: The Untold Stories	Fred Hackman	Episode: "Tony Kiritsis"
1991	Fallen Angels	Wilson Greeves	Television film
1992	Seinfeld	Cop #1	Episode: "The Ticket"
1993	Doogie Howser, M.D.	Stage Guard	Episode: "You've Come a Long Way, Babysitter"
1993	Wings	Murray	Episode: "The Key to Alex"
1993	The Positively True Adventures of the Alleged Texas Cheerleader-Murdering Mom	Bob Wilbur	Television film
1993	L.A. Law	Sam Hamman	Episode: "Testing, Testing, 1... 2... 3... 4"
1993	Saved by the Bell: The College Years	The Coach	Episode: "Pilot"
1994	Tonya & Nancy: The Inside Story	Ted Raynor	Television film
1994	Picket Fences	Lt. Col. Joseph Brent	Episode: "The Bus Stops Here"
1994	The X-Files	Sheriff Mazeroski	Episode: "Red Museum"
1995	Lois & Clark: The New Adventures of Superman	Doorman	Episode: "Chi of Steel"
1995	ER	Lorenzo	Episode: "Make of Two Hearts"
1995	The Commish	Chief Aaron Darrow	Episode: "In the Shadows of the Gallows"
1995, 1996	Diagnosis: Murder	Russ Marsh / Coz the Bartender	2 episodes
1996	The Rockford Files: If the Frame Fits...	Special Agent Millard Weeks	Television film
1996	Murphy Brown	Buchanan Operative	Episode: "The Bus Stops Here"
1996	Race Against Time: The Search for Sarah	Ben	Television film
1996	The Pretender	Cedar Point Sheriff	Episode: "To Serve and Protect"
1997	Sleeping with the Devil	Wes Dubrovich	Television film
1997	Murder One	Detective	Episode: "Chapter Thirteen, Year Two"
1997	Beyond Belief: Fact or Fiction	Mr. Stone	2 episodes
1997	Melrose Place	Detective Smith	Episode: "A Bump in the Night"
1997	Murder One: Diary of a Serial Killer	Detective	6 episodes
1997–1998	JAG	Master Chief Petty Officer Max Sullivan	Episodes: "Crossing the Line" & "Chains of Command"
1998	Ask Harriet	Jerry	Episode: "Turn Your Head & Kafka"
1999	Pensacola: Wings of Gold	Sheriff	Episode: "We Are Not Alone"
1999	The '60s	Big Max	Miniseries
1999	Profiler	Leo Cantrell	Episode: "Seduction"
1999	Three Secret	Vince	Television film
2000	Judging Amy	Ed Dunsmore	Episode: "Drawing the Line"
2000	Chicago Hope	McNeil's Coxarthrosis Patient	Episode: "Thoughts of You"
2000	Felicity	Fire Marshal Howard	Episode: "And to All a Good Night"
2001	Black Scorpion	Warden Brickhouse	4 episodes
2001	NYPD Blue	Deputy Commissioner Mueller	Episode: "Johnny Got His Gold"
2001	The District	Chief Darby	Episode: "Tug of War"
2002, 2005	Gilmore Girls	Sy	2 episodes
2003	Without a Trace	Lt. Col. Bull Carver	Episode: "Lam Li"
2003	The Guardian	Ron Hassey	Episode: "Let God Sort 'Em Out"
2004	The Handler	Colin Fitzpatrick	Episode: "Wedding Party"
2006	Vanished	Murphy Manning	Episode: "The Tunnel"
2007	Saving Grace	Pody Pope	Episode: "And You Wonder Why I Lie"
2007	Burn	Bernie Stubbs	Television film
2010	Cold Case	Carl Welter '10	Episode: "The Runaway Bunny"
2010	NCIS	Frank Smith	Episode: "Borderland"
2010	Dexter	Bill Bennett	3 episodes
2012	In Plain Sight	Cormac 'Sully' Sullivan	2 episodes
2014	Legit	Dave	Episode: "Loveline"
2017	Dipsticks	Jerry	Episode: "Debonair Bums"
