= Looking Up (film) =

Chinese film

- Theatrical release poster
- Chinese: 银河补习班
- Directed by: Deng Chao; Baimei Yu
- Written by: Baimei Yu
- Produced by: Leng Yi
- Starring: Deng Chao; Bai Yu; Ren Suxi; Wang Xi; Xilun Sun
- Cinematography: Max Da-Yung Wang
- Edited by: Ballu Saluja
- Music by: Steffen Thum
- Production company: Tianjin Orange Image Media
- Distributed by: Tianjin Orange Image Media; Horgos Orange Image Media; Tianjin Maoyan Weiying Media; Horgos Youth Enlight Pictures
- Release date: July 18, 2019
- Running time: 147 minutes
- Country: China
- Language: Mandarin
- Budget: ¥70 million (US$9.9 million)
- Box office: US$123 million

Looking Up (Chinese: 银河补习班; pinyin: Yín Hé Bǔ Xí Bān) is a 2019 Chinese drama film directed by Deng Chao and Baimei Yu. It was written by Baimei Yu, produced by Leng Yi, and starring Deng Chao, Bai Yu, Ren Suxi, Xi Wang, and Xilun Sun.

Looking Up premiered in China on July 18, 2019, and was released in the United States on July 19, 2019.

== Plot ==
At a press conference for the two astronauts about to go on the Shuguang No. 16 spacecraft – fourth-timer Gu Xinghe (Shao Bing) and first-timer Ma Fei (Bai Yu) – the latter's family is conspicuously not present.

September 1990: as a young boy (Feng Ze’ang) in the city of Dongpei, Ma Fei's father, engineer Ma Haowen (Deng Chao), had given him a globe made from a football. But during a splashy ceremony for the opening of a bridge that Ma Haowen had designed, the bridge had collapsed, tarring Ma Haowen's reputation forever.

15 December 2019: After 57 days the two astronauts are due to return to Earth in three days’ time. Suddenly, however, all contact is lost with Jiuquan when some space debris damages the spacecraft's radio antenna.

February 1991: Ma Haowen has been convicted of negligence and sent to a remote prison, where his wife Xinyu (Ren Suxi) visits and gets him to sign divorce papers. During his prison sentence, Ma Haowen is bullied by fellow convicts; at home, his son Ma Fei is also bullied.

In 1997 Ma Haowen returned home to Dongpei after seven years, still hated by people in the town. Xinyu now has a sugar daddy, railway administrator Meng (Liang Chao), and the two have sent Ma Fei (Sun Xilun) to Boyu High School, an exclusive local boarder that's among the four best in Dongpei. When Ma Fei is expelled for skipping class and reading a Jin Yong martial arts novel, Ma Haowen publicly challenges the headmaster, Yan (Li Jianyi), over the decision that if he can make his son become a top ten student, Yan will overturn his decision to expel him. Yan finally agrees to let Ma Fei stay on for a while, as long as he makes the top 10 in class. When Meng has to go to Guangzhou on business, Ma Haowen spends time with his son but he's still mocked by locals in the street and still can't find a job due to his tarnished reputation, despite his vast architectural experience. One man, Liu Baliang (Wu Yaheng) who works as a construction supervisor does give him a job after Ma Haowen helps him out in setting a proper demolition of a structure in just two minutes while Liu's men cannot; and Ma Haowen's one-time apprentice, Lu Datou (Wang Ge), surreptitiously gives him and his son a place to stay. In return, Ma Haowen does a lot of work under Lu Datou's name.

With his father's encouragement, Ma Fei starts to study hard, though Xinyu is appalled at what is going on. At the high school, Ma Haowen becomes friendly with Gao Tianxiang (Wang Xi), a young replacement teacher who believes in Ma Fei. Ma Haowen tries to get his son to learn in a lateral way, not just rote from school books, and to open his eyes to the world. He finally pulls him out of high school and educates him on the road, though Ma Fei is almost drowned in a heavy storm that separates the two of them. After a difficult test, Ma Fei failed to score in the top ten but Ma Haowen cheered his son up and stated that he was still proud of him for trying his best. Gao sneaks into the principal's office and finds Ma Fei's essay and persuades the teacher's council to give Ma Fei a chance to read his essay, which she believes to be good enough to give him a top-ten position. Eventually, the essay moves the teachers and enables Ma Fei to have a perfect score to be a top ten student, making Yan lose the bet. Outside, an insane man comes and wreaks havoc on the school grounds and Ma Haowen forces the principal to reveal that the insane man is actually Yan's son who was once a top student but after a failed test, Yan disowned his son. Depressed, the son committed suicide but survived. However, the head injuries from the suicide caused him to become mentally invalid.

After revealing the truth, Yan breaks down and cries causing everyone to realize that the reason he puts Ma Fei down is to hide his own failure as a father. Ma Haowen then makes Yan change his way as his conservative way is the reason why he lost his son.

Several years later, Ma Fei graduated from his school and was accepted into aviation school. While eating at a restaurant, Ma Haowen discovered that Lu Datou was the one behind the collapse of the bridge after eavesdropping on him talking with his subordinate. Shocked to realize that the reason why Lu was so nice to him and his son was to avoid suspicion all the time, Haowen breaks into the room and confronts Lu. Cornered, Lu reveals that he sabotaged the bridge to gain Haowen's position as chief engineer. Enraged, Haowen beats up Lu and brings him to the court to fully vindicate him after many years.

16 December 2019: Ma Fei volunteers to go outside the spacecraft to inspect the damaged antenna, without which they cannot return to Earth. Gu Xinghe forbids him, but eventually Ma Fei is to make his own, unconventional decision, as his father has always taught him.

== Cast ==
- Deng Chao as Ma Haowen
  - Ma Haowen has been working hard to give his children a relatively free educational environment. He has only one requirement for his children, "Don't stop thinking". He hopes that his children can think independently, face the world bravely, and do what they like.
- Bai Yu as Ma Fei (Adult son)
  - Ma Fei is the son of Ma Haowen and Xinyu. When he grew up, he realized his dream and became an astronaut. Ma Fei's disagreement with his father before going into space made Ma Haowen suspect that his education had failed. When encountering difficulties in space, Ma Fei once again remembered every step his father taught him on the way to grow up.
- Ren Suxi as Xinyu
  - Xinyu is Ma Fei's mother and Ma Haowen's ex-wife, who later remarried to Lao Meng. She has a fiery personality on the surface but a stoic heart. She had a dispute with Ma Haowen because of her son's education, and believed that Ma Haowen regarded her son as his experimental product.
- Wang Xi as Teacher Xiao Gao
  - Teacher Xiao Gao of Boyu School, facing Ma Fei, a "problem student" who was almost expelled from the school, as an acting class teacher, she never gave up on her students. She is quite dissatisfied with Director Yan's attitude of "targeting" the poor student Ma Fei, and she always tries her best to help Ma Fei.
- Sun Xilun as Ma Fei (Youth son)
  - Ma Fei, a young student in the first year of junior high school, lost the seven years of his father's accompanying growth because of his father Ma Haowen's imprisonment. Because his mother was busy with her career, Ma Fei, who lacked interest and confidence in learning, became rather rebellious.
- Li Jianyi as Director Yan
  - Director of Ma Fei School. In school, Ma Fei, who was at the bottom of the grades, has always been a student who caused Director Yan a headache, "No matter how hard you wash coal balls, they will never turn into diamonds." Facing his son Ma Fei who is not favored by the teacher, his father Ma Haowen and the teaching director, Director Yan, made a bet, and an educational game kicked off.
- Chao Liang as Uncle Meng
  - After Xinyu and Ma Haowen divorced, they remarried to Lao Meng, and the upright Lao Meng became Ma Fei's stepfather. Although he often couldn't understand what Ma Haowen was saying, he could always agree with Ma Haowen instinctively, because Ma Fei was also rushing about going to school.
- Bing Shao as Gu Xinghe
- Ge Wang as Lu Datou
- Yaheng Wu as Liu Baliang
- Zun Wei as Fengzi
- Zeang Feng as Ma Fei (Childhood son)
- Zhidi Bai Ma as Fei's high school teacher
- Lele Dai Gu as Xinghe's wife
- Jing Wu as Pan Wanli

== Music ==
Steffen Thum's score was recorded at Synchron Stage in Vienna.

== Production ==
=== Creative Background ===
Xi'an is the hometown of director Yu Baimei, and it is from here that Yu Baimei went out and embarked on the road of film. Yu Baimei said that many of Ma Haowen's stories in the film come from his father, and the film is also a gift he dedicated to his father. In the film, Ma Haowen took Ma Fei to observe nature to understand the meaning of the poem "the grass looks far away, but there is nothing close up", which is the true story of Yu's father. Yu Baimei said that he studied computer science at Xidian University, and he worked in a very good unit after graduation, but that job was not what he wanted to do, and he was determined to write scripts. The whole family opposed it, thinking that he was too far away from this industry. In the end, it was his father who supported him to go the way he wanted to go.

=== Casting ===
Director Deng Chao personally played the role of Ma Fei's father Ma Haowen. Sun Xilun and Feng Zeang played the roles of Ma Fei as a child and Ma Fei as a teenager respectively, and Bai Yu as an adult Ma Fei. Sun Xilun and Feng Ze'ang were selected by the director from tens of thousands of young actors, while Bai Yu was the crew's favorite from the very beginning.

Ren Suxi was selected by director Yu Baimei as the candidate for the role of Xinyu by virtue of her performance in works such as "Donkey Gets Water" and "The Unknown Man".

In order to find an actor with outstanding temperament and the appearance of a female teacher in the 90s, the two directors chose Wang Xilai to play Teacher Xiao Gao among thousands of actors.

=== Preliminary Reparation ===
There is a large part of the film that restores the appearance of cities in the 1990s. In order to ensure that the scenes are realistic, the crew has visited and investigated more than 200 cities across the country. Aspects meet the above characteristics.

On June 15, 2018, Deng Chao led the crew of the film to set up a location in Jiande-17 Xin'an River, Hangzhou. From June 16 to 19, Deng Chao successively visited many primary and secondary schools, factories, residential buildings, railway stations, and the Land and Resources Bureau in Lanxi to see the scenery. On June 18, Lanxi officially announced the recruitment of extras. In less than 24 hours, the number of applicants exceeded 4,000. On June 20, auditioned extras in the Lanxi Sports Center. On June 21, the crew came to the Jiuquan Satellite Launch Center to check in.

There are more than 9,000 sets of costumes in the film, and more than 1,000 sets of costumes are needed for just one scene of the Asian Games. The styles and details of each set are different. For this reason, the crew consulted a lot of historical materials, changed their drafts, and restored the school on the spot. Hospitals, folk customs, dances, etc. More than 20 mass squares were dispatched at the same time; the art department produced more than 24,000 pieces, ranging from frog toys, BB machines, to Kodak film washing shops, shaved ice stands on the road, and even roadside pandas. The shape of cartoon trash cans all bear the imprint of the age.

=== Shooting Process ===
On September 10, 2018, "Galaxy Tutorial" announced its launch, and the launch conference was scheduled to be held at Shushan Middle School in Lanxi, Zhejiang. On October 28, the shooting ceremony of the film was held in Jiande City. On January 3, 2019, the film was announced to be finished.

The main scene in the film that reproduces the catastrophic flood in 1998 is both a continuous night scene and a rain scene. In the cold night of early autumn, Deng Chao took the lead in climbing back and forth on the dam in the torrential rain. Regardless of his body covered in mud and his lips turning purple from the cold, he kept asking for "one more" and fought for more than 10 consecutive nights. What is even more challenging is that in addition to completing the performance, Deng Chao also directed the shooting of complex long shots, and worked with Yu Baimei to complete the large-scale scene scheduling involving thousands of actors such as flood fighting officers and soldiers, and people in the disaster area.

=== Props and Sets ===
==== Asian Games ====
For the scene of the Asian Games alone, the crew started preparations 180 days in advance, took 1,400 hours, and actually trained 30 phalanxes. On the set, the extras shouted cheers and slogans. Director Yu Baimei said that there is only one sentence in the script, "a sea of people", but they had to do a lot of homework to realize this "sea of people" when shooting. They found thousands of historical concept drawings, the police at that time, the old man playing the suona, the lion dance team, the medical team, the bystanders on both sides, and the garland team. "The level of sophistication is even "even the hairstyles of every background crowd must conform to the times." The torch in Ma Haowen's hand was found by the designer of the Asian Games torch back then, and a 1:1 restoration is absolutely "authentic".

==== Flood ====
The flood scene in the film is the most difficult scene in the film. It took the crew 50 days to complete the construction of the dam, which is equivalent to moving two mountains. The actors of the disaster relief soldiers in the play were the first to receive training in the film. The most difficult part is the precipitation. All actors and crew members have to keep working in the majestic rainfall, the amount of rainfall in three days is equivalent to 4 swimming pools. Most of these shots required thousands of people to be dispatched at the same time. Under the high tension and rigorous preparation, this group of scenes that were most difficult to complete was filmed the fastest. The weather was not too hot when shooting, and the water temperature was only a dozen degrees. Actor Sun Xilun spent three days soaking in the water while filming this scene, and it was still drenched in "heavy rain". Deng Chao said that after one shot, they quickly pulled him up to wrap him in a blanket and bake the lamp. He was shivering from the cold, and his lips turned white, but when it was time for him to be shot, he went into the water without saying a word, without being coquettish for a minute. Not only hard work, but also very "high risk". The camera and lighting must operate in the flooded scene, and there are wires connected everywhere, and the circuit insurance must be foolproof.

==== Aerospace ====
The aerospace scenes in the film originated from the production of behind-the-scenes personnel from four countries. The special effects part is the responsibility of the Russian team that once produced "Space Rescue". The orbital module of "Dawn 16" in the movie is built according to the real Chinese spacecraft. Considering that the plot takes place in the future, some futuristic elements are added. In order to build the entire platform, the crew did detailed desk work and manufactured it precisely, from the model of the screws to the material texture of each panel. At least tens of thousands of screws were used.

The name of the spacecraft also has a lot of origins: the "Dawn" program, also known as Project 714, was the first crewed space program in Chinese history, but was shelved for some reason. The film named the spacecraft carried by Ma Fei as "Dawn 16", which is a nostalgic commemoration and a high tribute to China's aerospace industry. In the movie, Wentian Pavilion is restored and built with reference to the 1:1 ratio of the style of Jiuquan Aerospace Base in China.

The film also invited a number of aerospace experts as consultants to help the crew check the aerospace part setting one by one to ensure the authenticity: from the expression of technical terms such as relay antenna, lift return, and heat insulation tile damage, to the action design of the out-of-vehicle operation, the open space, etc. Communication system, three sets of redundant system design, etc., are professionally checked. In particular, how to return to the cabin after Ma Fei left the cabin to repair the antenna is feasible in the scientific redundant design: astronauts can use the design of redundant oxygen to buy enough time to realize the return operation.

Most of Bai Yu's roles are concentrated in the aerospace part, and he has to complete a large number of difficult movements such as simulating weightlessness and space walking. In order to create a realistic weightless effect, he needs to be tied to a wire and rehearse continuously for more than ten hours every day at a height of more than 10 meters. The result is often that after the rehearsal, the muscles of his whole body are stiff and unable to move. In order to complete this role, Bai Yu took the initiative to ask to join the group to receive special training one month in advance. The film took 2,521 hours and the work of 2,400 people in front of and behind the scenes to reproduce the torrent of the 30-year era.

==== Soundtrack Team ====
In terms of soundtrack, Stephen Tom, who has composed the soundtracks for "Mission: Impossible 6" and "Ghost in the Shell", was invited to be responsible for the original soundtrack for the film. The music of the movie is divided into two themes, the theme of father and son is warm and heartwarming, and the theme of space is passionate and mighty. Deng Chao and Yu Baimei made a special trip to Vienna, Austria, and gathered 80 musicians to score the film live. The sound production of the film invited Michael Hengis, who won the Oscar for Best Sound Effects twice. The film adopts the Dolby panoramic sound system, and uses different tools to make the sound appear in all directions, so that the audience can feel the surround sound effect no matter where they sit in the theater, and feel immersive.

==== Editing Team ====
The editing director of the film is Balu Saluya, who once served as a judge for the Oscars and is also the director of the Indian film "Wrestle!" The editing guide of "Dad". The final cut of the film is nearly 2 hours and 30 minutes long.

== Release and promotion ==
The film was released on July 24, 2019, and featured at the 2019 Busan International Film Festival as well as the 32nd Tokyo International Film Festival.

== Awards and nominations ==
Year	Ceremony	Category	Recipient	Results
2019	The 11th Macau International Film Festival	Best Actress	Ren Suxi	Nominated
2019	The 11th Macau International Film Festival	Best Actor	Dong Chao	Nominated
2019	The 11th Macau International Film Festival	Best Film	Looking Up	Nominated
2019	The 6th Hengdian Film and Television Festival	Best Screenplay	Yu Baimei	Won
2019	Weibo Movie Night	Best Actor	Louis Koo	Won
2019	The 6th "Wen Rong Award"	Best Screenplay	Looking Up	Won
2020	The 27th Huading Award	Best New Actor Award	Wang Xi	Nominated
2021	Weibo Movie Night	Best Actor	Louis Koo	Won
