= Paul Hertel =

Austrian composer (born 1953)

Paul Hertel (born 9 May 1953 in Vienna) is an Austrian composer. He is a recipient of the Theodor Körner Prize, Staatsstipendium der Republik Österreich, and has an Honorary Degree as the Best Composer of Film Music at the 12th International Fajr Film Festival.

He provided the film score to the film Der gute Ort.

== See also ==
- Music of Austria
