= Max Aruj =

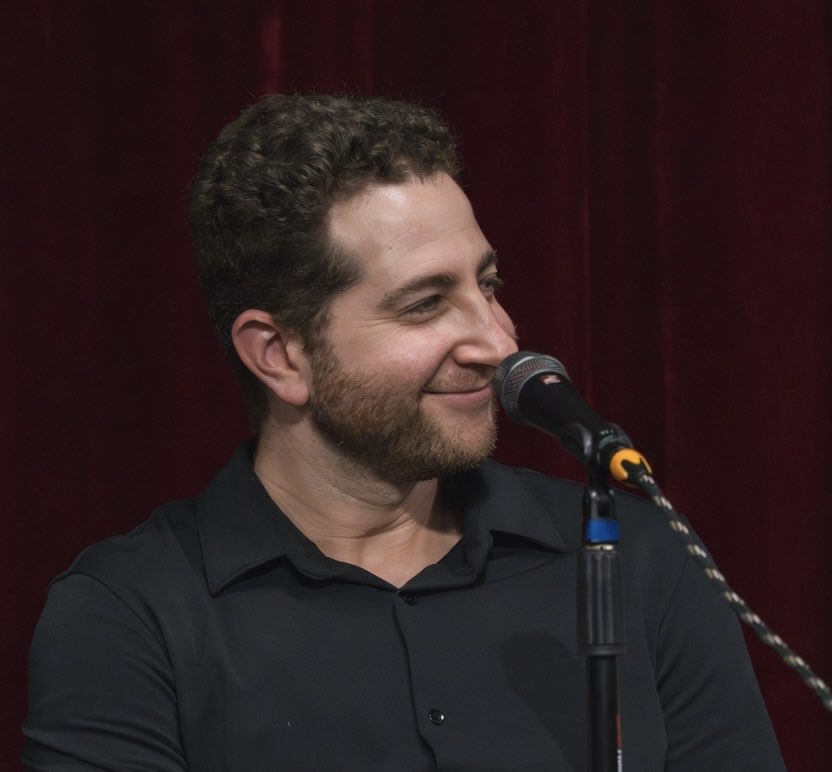
- Aruj in May 2026

Background information
- Born: Max Simon Aruj; August 7, 1989 (age 37); Los Angeles, California, U.S.
- Education: USC Thornton School of Music (BM)
- Genres: Film and television scores, jazz, electronic
- Occupations: Composer, music producer
- Instruments: Piano, keyboards, synthesizer, guitar
- Years active: 2010s–present
- Website: maxaruj.com

Max Aruj (born August 7, 1989) is an American composer known for his work in film, television, and video games.

== Early life ==
Aruj was born and raised in Los Angeles. He began playing classical and jazz piano at age six and started composing music in high school, including scoring a student film titled Black Martini. He earned a Bachelor of Music in composition from the USC Thornton School of Music between 2007 and 2012, along with a minor in business administration from USC Marshall School of Business.

== Career ==
Aruj began his professional career with an internship at Hans Zimmer's Remote Control Productions during his studies at USC, where he later worked extensively with composers Lorne Balfe and Rupert Gregson-Williams. His early contributions included additional music and arrangements for projects such as Top Gun: Maverick (2022), Mission: Impossible – Fallout (2018), Black Widow (2021), The Crown, and His Dark Materials.

As a lead composer, Aruj scored the horror film Crawl (2019), the crime drama Lansky (2021), and action thriller The Ice Road (2021) starring Liam Neeson. He composed for the video game expansion Assassin's Creed Valhalla: Wrath of the Druids (2021) and the Netflix animated series Mech Cadets (2023).

Other notable scores include The Tank (2023), the documentary MoviePass, MovieCrash (2024), and Betrayal (2024). In 2025, he composed the score for Mission: Impossible – The Final Reckoning in collaboration with Alfie Godfrey.

Beyond screen media, Aruj co-produced the orchestral album Gravity Deluxe by electronic music artist Gryffin.

== Selected filmography ==
Year	Title	Director	Notes
2019	Crawl	Alexandre Aja	Co-composed with Steffen Thum
2021	Me You Madness	Louise Linton	
2021	Lansky	Eytan Rockaway	
2021	The Ice Road	Jonathan Hensleigh	
2021	Assassin's Creed Valhalla: Wrath of the Druids	Ashraf Ismail; Eric Baptizat	Video game DLC
2023	The Tank	Scott Walker	
2023	Betrayal	Rodger Griffiths	Co-composed with Steffen Thum
2023	Mech Cadets	Kazuma Shimzu; Hiroyuki Hayashi	Television series; 8 episodes
2024	MoviePass, MovieCrash	Muta’Ali	Documentary film
2025	Mission: Impossible – The Final Reckoning	Christopher McQuarrie	Replaced Lorne Balfe; co-composed with Alfie Godfrey
2026	Screamer	Federico Cardini	Video game
2026	Man on Fire	Steven Caple Jr. Vicente Amorim; Clare Kilner; Michael Cuesta	Television series; 7 episodes
2026	The Girl in the River	Brando Benetton	
