= Steffen Thum =

- Born: 8 June 1988 (age 37); Germany
- Genres: Film score
- Occupation: Composer
- Website: steffenthum.com

Steffen Thum (born 8 June 1988) is a German composer for film, TV, games and advertising, based in Berlin. He is known for his work on the Netflix Original film The Old Guard 2, Paramount Pictures' Crawl, Slingshot, Stockholm Bloodbath, Looking Up, the Netflix Original film iBoy and the indie thriller Warning Shot.

His score for the 2020 horror feature film Tribal - Get Out Alive won Best Original Score at the UK Motion Picture Festival.

From 2014 to 2020, Thum worked at Hans Zimmer's studio Remote Control Productions, providing additional music for feature films like Top Gun: Maverick, Black Widow, Bad Boys For Life and Mission Impossible: Fallout, TV shows like The Crown, His Dark Materials and Genius, as well as video games like Skylanders: Superchargers, among others.

The Film Music Institute listed him among "Best Scores of 2019 - Composers To Watch".

== Filmography (selection) ==
Composer

- 2017: iBoy
- 2018: Warning Shot
- 2019: Crawl
- 2019: Looking Up
- 2019: This Is Football
- 2020: Tribal - Get Out Alive
- 2021: Quinceañero (Short)
- 2023: Stockholm Bloodbath
- 2023: Betrayal
- 2024: Slingshot
- 2025: The Old Guard 2

Further Credits (Additional Music & Arrangement)

- 2015: Terminator: Genisys
- 2015: Skylanders: SuperChargers
- 2015: Saints & Strangers (TV series)
- 2016: 13 Hours: The Secret Soldiers of Benghazi
- 2016: War on Everyone
- 2016–2017: The Crown (TV series)
- 2016–2020: Marcella (TV series)
- 2016–2019: The Story of God with Morgan Freeman (TV series)
- 2017: The Lego Batman Movie
- 2017: Ghost In The Shell
- 2017: Churchill
- 2017: Rakka (Short)
- 2017: Zygote (Short)
- 2017: Genius: Albert Einstein (TV series)
- 2017: Transformers: The Last Knight
- 2017: Dunkirk (uncredited)
- 2017: Geostorm
- 2018: Operation: 12 Strong
- 2018: Studio 54: The Documentary
- 2018: The Hurricane Heist
- 2018–2021: Bulletproof (TV series)
- 2018: The Investigator: A British Crime Story (TV series)
- 2018: Genius: Picasso (TV series)
- 2018: Mission Impossible: Fallout
- 2018: Driven
- 2018: FIFA 19 (Video Game)
- 2018: The Cry (TV series)
- 2019: Where's My Roy Cohn?
- 2019: Georgetown
- 2019: Ad Astra
- 2019: Gemini Man
- 2019: 6 Underground
- 2019–2020: His Dark Materials (TV series)
- 2020: Bad Boys For Life
- 2020: Rebuilding Paradise
- 2020: The Reagans (TV series)
- 2020: Songbird
- 2021: Pennyworth (TV series)
- 2021: Black Widow
- 2021: Rumble
- 2022: The Gilded Age (TV series)
- 2022: Top Gun: Maverick
- 2023: Hunters (TV series)
- 2023: Murder Mystery 2
- 2023: Marvel's Spider-Man 2
- 2023: Aquaman and the Lost Kingdom
- 2024: Alien: Romulus
- 2024: Twisters
- 2024: Dragon Age: The Veilguard
- 2025: Mission: Impossible – The Final Reckoning
