= Chevy Humphrey =

American museum director

Chevy Humphrey is President and CEO of Griffin Museum of Science and Industry in Chicago. In 2005 she became the first Black American to lead a science center as President and CEO of the Arizona Science Center. She serves on several Boards including Choose Chicago, the Argonne National Lab, and The Theodore Roosevelt Presidential Library.

== Early life and education ==
Humphrey was born in Houston, Texas. During her early years her family valued education, having her bussed each day to a school in a neighborhood 45 minutes away. She attended University of Phoenix to earn her Bachelor's degree and completed her Masters at Northeastern University. In 2024, she eared a doctoral degree in business administration from Grand Canyon University.

== Career ==
Humphrey credits her worth ethic and career foundation to her father. She told The New York Times:

"My father allowed me to be the C.E.O. and C.F.O. of our household. I actually had to pay the bills. I had to write the checks out. I had to keep the books. I always knew I wanted to be a manager or C.E.O. of something. I wanted to be in charge."

Humphrey's first job was at a Baskin-Robbins in her home town of Houston. As she advanced through her career, one of her long term goals was to become a CEO of a nonprofit, "You get to run a business, but that business goes back to supporting the community, and all the proceeds that you build, you reinvest in the community or reinvest in people." After moving into nonprofits, she held leadership positions at University of Texas at Austin, University of Houston, and Houston Symphony Orchestra. She has a long history of museum leadership, working as a museum CEO for 20 years.

=== Arizona Space Center ===
In 1998 Humphrey was hired as director of development at the Arizona Science Center. During her time there she served as vice president of marketing, executive vice president, and interim CEO. In 2005 Humphrey was named the Hazel A. Hare President and CEO of the institution.

To honor her contributions the Center created the Chevy Humphrey Women in STEM Scholarship, funded by the Helios Education Foundation.

"This award celebrates the contributions of Chevy Humphrey, whose STEM advocacy and inclusion work has been vital to expanding STEM education here in Arizona,” said Guy Labine, current The Hazel A. Hare President and CEO of Arizona Science Center.

Under Humphrey’s leadership, museum assets grew from $3 million to $42 million and both annual revenue and the number of annual visitors increased.

=== Griffin Museum of Science and Industry ===
In 2020 Humphrey joined Griffin Museum of Science and Industry as President and CEO. She became the first woman to hold the position.

In 2024, under Humphrey's leadership, thanks to "the largest single gift in the museum’s history," the Museum of Science and Industry was rebranded as Griffin Museum of Science and Industry. At this time, the Museum also refreshed the Henry Crown Space Center adding historic and space-tested artifacts including a SpaceX Dragon capsule. Humphrey was instrumental in acquiring the Dragon capsule, working closing with board members to secure the first large artifact in more than 30 years.

The Museum is set to reopen the South Portico entrance in 2027. Humphrey's leadership helped secure funding and gain support of the local community during the planning of the new ADA accessible entrance. The construction project is using a "light touch" to match the historic design of the 133 year old building. Humphrey told the Chicago Sun-Times “We want to celebrate that history, but we also want to show how we’re modernizing [and bringing] it back to its original intent of welcoming visitors on the south side of our building.”

Humphrey is continuing her efforts to work with the Jackson Park community alongside the Obama Presidential Center.

In a joint op-ed in the Chicago Tribune, Obama Foundation CEO Valerie Jarrett and Humphrey wrote:

"Access is the word that unites us — not as a mere brochure promise but as design decisions. Both of our institutions are also leading with free admission days, creative spaces and after-school programs that draw young people from the neighborhoods that ring this campus."
