= Museum of Science and Industry (Chicago) =

Science museum in Chicago, Illinois

Griffin Museum of Science and Industry

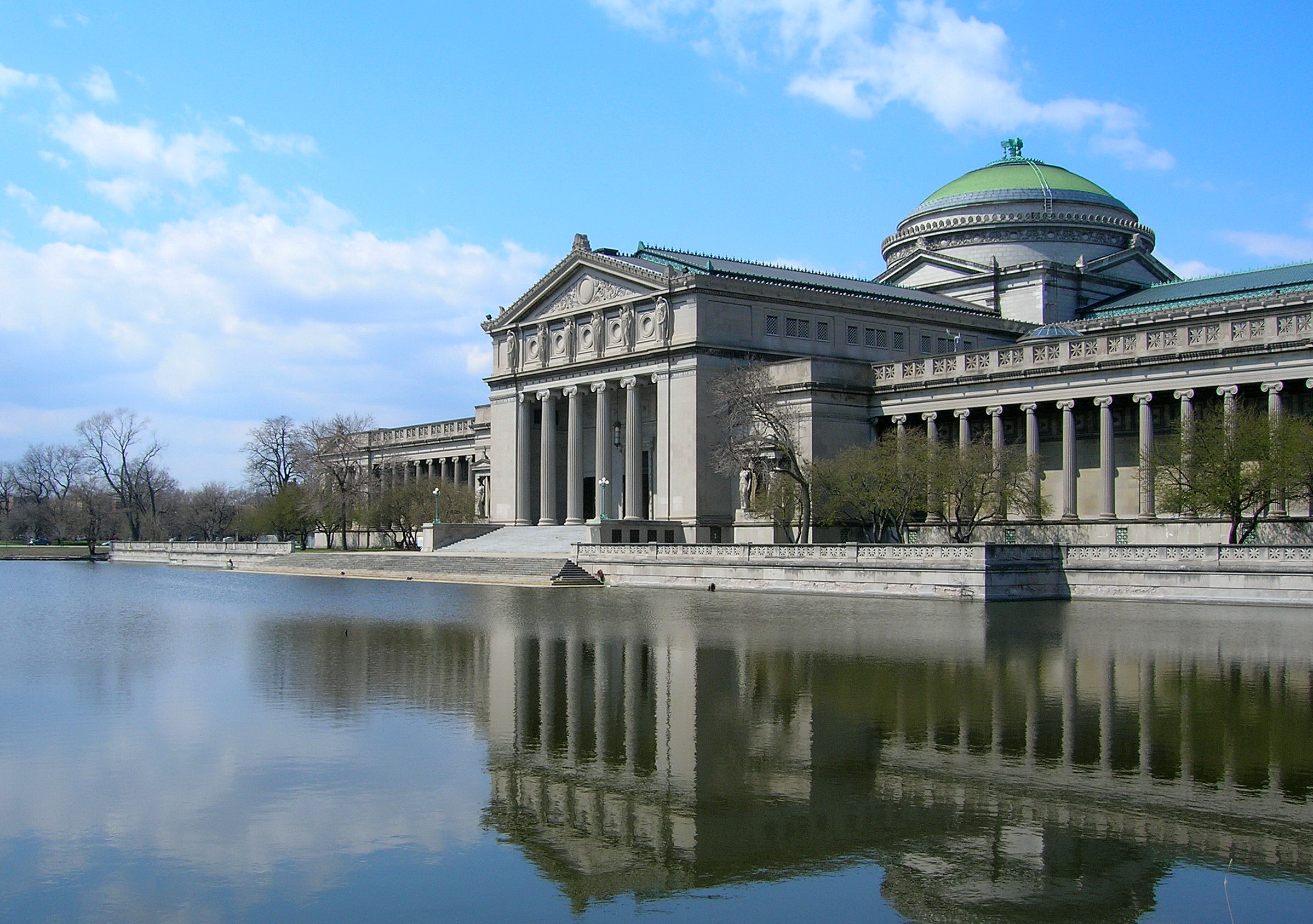
- The south facade of the Museum overlooks a reflecting lagoon in Jackson Park, 2007.
- Former name: Chicago Museum of Science and Industry, Rosenwald Industrial Museum
- Established: 1933; 93 years ago
- Location: 5700 South DuSable Lake Shore Drive; Chicago, Illinois, 60637
- Coordinates: 41°47′26″N 87°34′58″W
- Type: Science and technology museum
- Visitors: 1.5 million (2016)
- Founder: Julius Rosenwald
- Directors: Chevy Humphrey, President and CEO
- Public transit access: CTA bus routes: 6 10 28 55; Metra/South Shore Line Train: 55th/56th/57th Street
- Website: griffinmsi.org

Chicago Landmark
- Designated: November 1, 1995

The Griffin Museum of Science and Industry (MSI; formerly Museum of Science and Industry) is a private, non-profit science museum located in Jackson Park, the Hyde Park neighborhood, Chicago, Illinois. It is adjacent to Lake Michigan and the University of Chicago campus.

The museum is housed in the Palace of Fine Arts built during the 1893 World's Columbian Exposition (also known as the 1893 Chicago World's Fair). Initially endowed by Sears, Roebuck and Company president and philanthropist Julius Rosenwald and supported by the Commercial Club of Chicago, it opened in 1933 during the Century of Progress Exposition, (also known as the 1933 Chicago's World's Fair). It was renamed for benefactor and financier Kenneth C. Griffin on May 19, 2024.

Among the museum's most popular exhibits are the actual German submarine U-505 Type IXC captured during World War II; a United Airlines Boeing 727; the Pioneer Zephyr (the first streamlined diesel-powered passenger train in the US); the command module of the Apollo 8 spacecraft; a full-size replica coal mine; and a 3,500-square-foot (330 m^{2}) model railroad. Permanent or special exhibits cover manufacturing, environmental science, chemistry, physics, computers, the brain, mechanics of the human body, and agricultural science, among other subjects.

== History ==
=== World's Columbian Exposition and aftermath ===
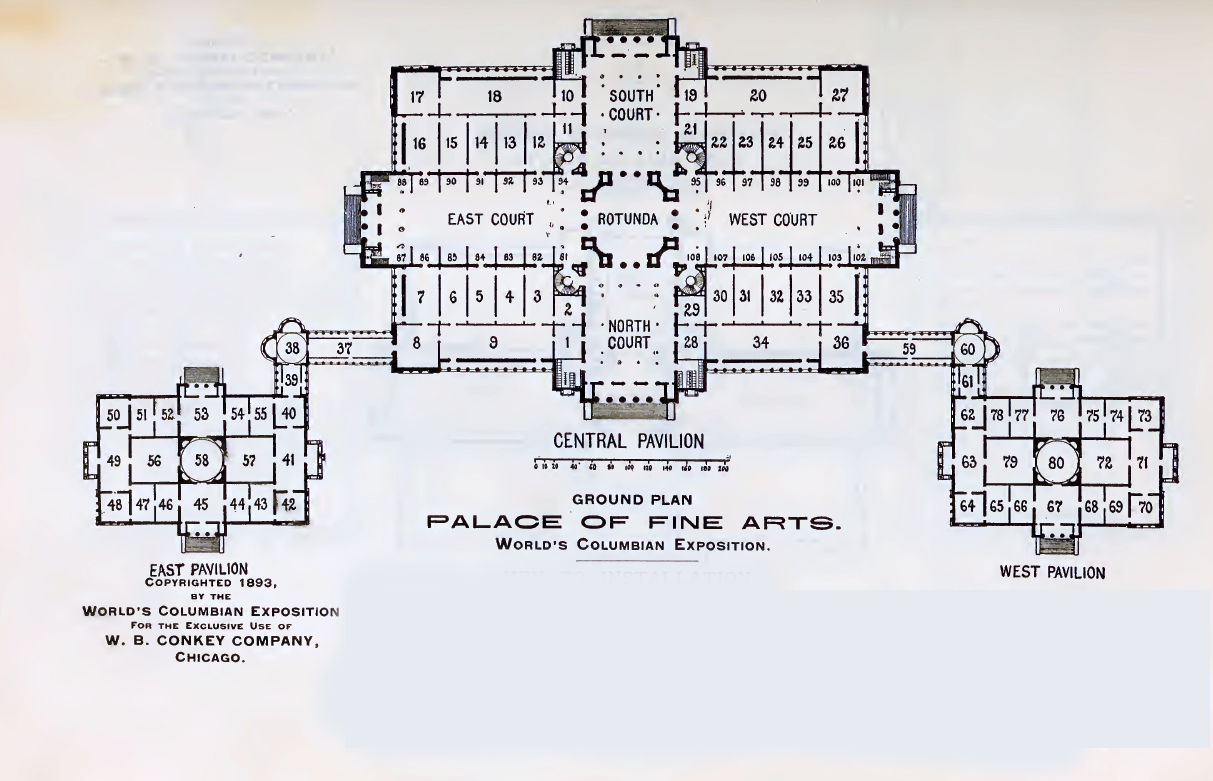
Palace of Fine Arts floor plan

The building which houses the Museum was constructed as the Palace of Fine Arts, built for the 1893 World's Columbian Exposition and designed by Charles B. Atwood for D. H. Burnham & Company. During the fair, the palace displayed paintings, prints, drawing, sculpture, and metalwork from around the world. Unlike the other "White City" buildings, which were primarily temporary, it was constructed with a permanent brick substructure under its plaster facade.

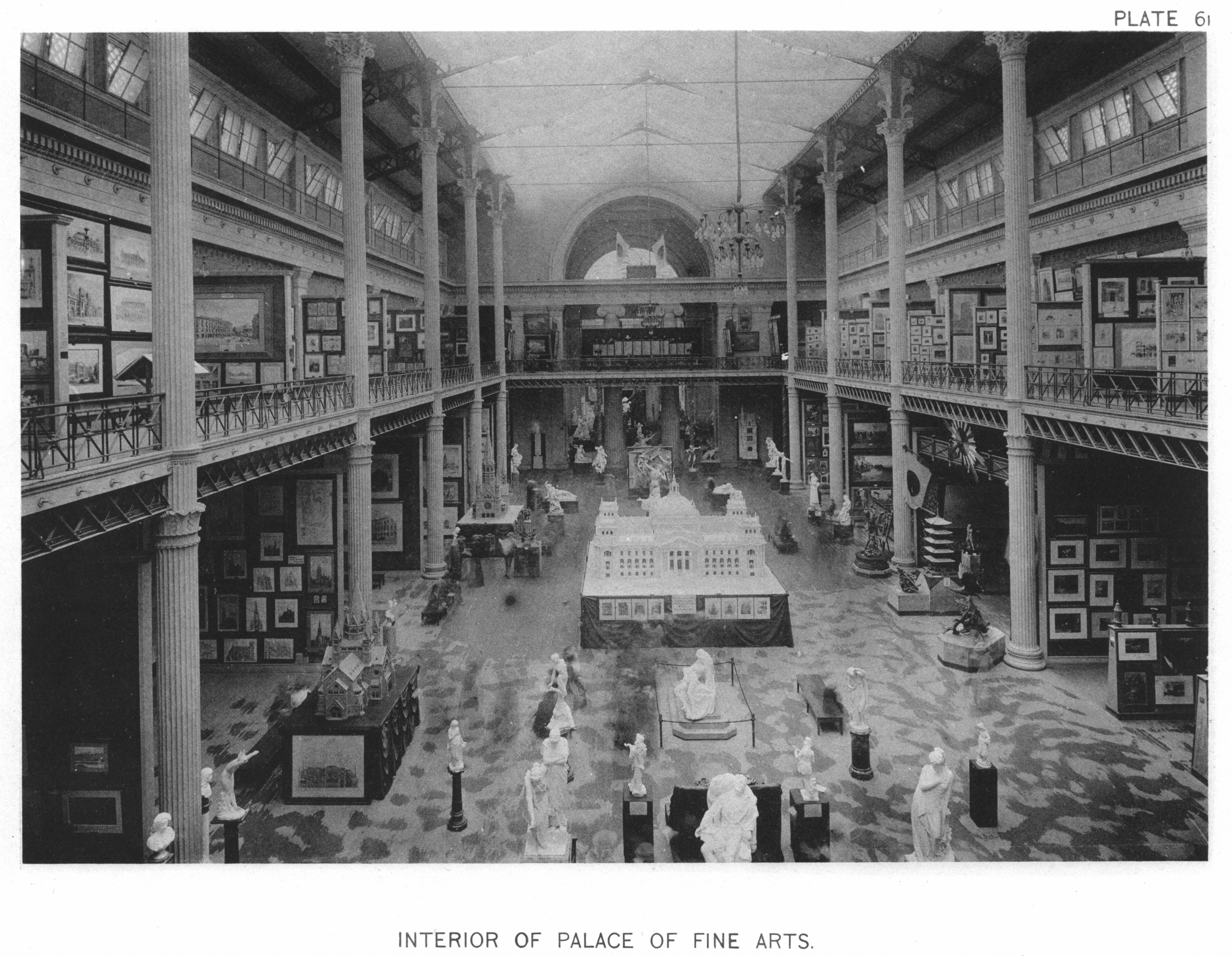
Interior of Palace of Fine Arts. Unlike other structures at the World's Fair, the palace was constructed to be more permanent.

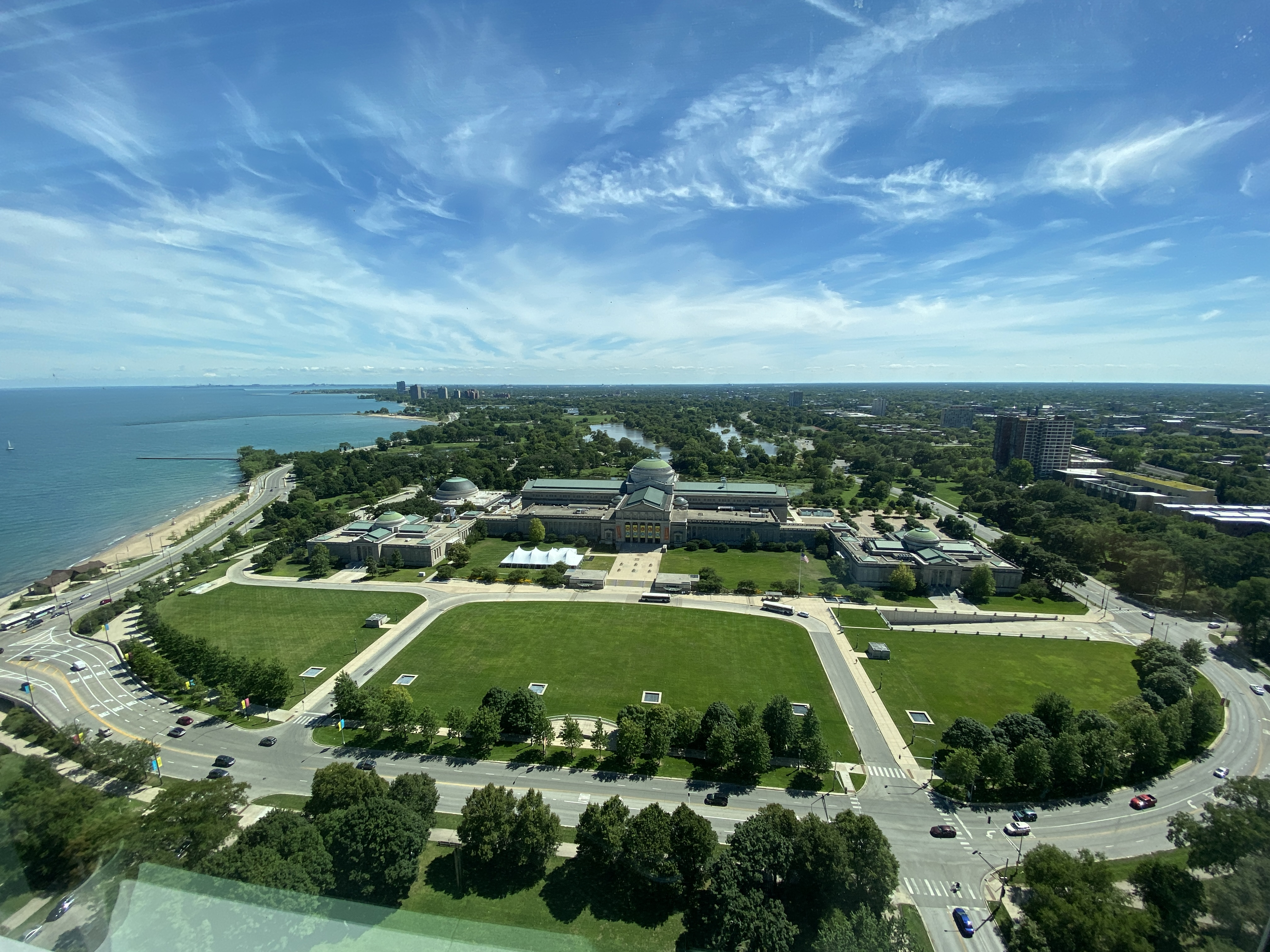
Museum of Science and Industry from 1700 East 56th Street

After the World's Fair, the palace initially housed the Columbian Museum, largely displaying collections left from the fair, which evolved into the Field Museum of Natural History. When the Field Museum moved to a new building five miles north in the Near South Side in 1920, the palace was left vacant.

School of the Art Institute of Chicago professor Lorado Taft led a public campaign to restore the building and turn it into another art museum, one devoted to sculpture. The South Park Commissioners (now part of the Chicago Park District) won approval in a referendum to sell $5 million in bonds to pay for restoration costs, hoping to turn the building into a sculpture museum, a technical trade school, and other things. However, after a few years, the building was selected as the site for a new science museum.

=== Museum formation ===
At this time, the Commercial Club of Chicago was interested in establishing a science museum in Chicago. Julius Rosenwald, philanthropist and Sears, Roebuck and Company president, energized his fellow club members by pledging to pay $3 million towards the cost of converting the Palace of Fine Arts; Rosenwald eventually contributed more than $5 million ($118 million in 2025) to the project. During its conversion into the MSI, the building's exterior was re-cast in limestone to retain its 1893 Beaux Arts look. The interior was replaced with a new one in Art Moderne style designed by Alfred P. Shaw.

Rosenwald established the museum organization in 1926 but declined to have his name on the building. For the first two years of development, the museum was often referred to as the "Rosenwald Industrial Museum". In 1928, the name of the museum officially became the Museum of Science and Industry. Rosenwald's vision was to create a museum in the style of the Deutsches Museum of science and technology in Munich, which he had visited in 1911 while in Germany with his family.

Sewell Avery, another businessman, had supported the museum within the Commercial Club and was selected as its first president of the board of directors. The museum conducted a nationwide search for the first director. MSI's Board of Directors selected Waldemar Kaempffert, then the science editor of The New York Times, because he shared Rosenwald's vision.

He assembled the museum's curatorial staff and directed the organization and construction of the exhibits. In order to prepare the museum, Kaempffert and his staff visited the Deutsches Museum in Munich, the Science Museum in Kensington, and the Technical Museum in Vienna, all of which served as models. Kaempffert was instrumental in developing close ties with the science departments of the University of Chicago, which supplied much of the scholarship for the exhibits. Kaempffert resigned in early 1931 amid growing disputes with the second president of the board of directors; they disagreed over the objectivity and neutrality of the exhibits and Kaempffert's management of the staff.

=== Opening ===
The museum underwent renovation work, including the installation of a Ludowici tile roof on the central dome in 1930, before opening to the public in three stages between 1933 and 1940. The first opening ceremony took place during the Century of Progress Exposition. Two of the museum's presidents, a number of curators and other staff members, and exhibits came to MSI from the Century of Progress event.

In 1992, the museum began planning a series of renovations as part of the "MSI2000" plan. This included an underground three-level parking deck beneath the front lawn. Construction of the underground parking deck was finished in July 1998. These renovations also eventually incorporated a new subterranean main entrance hall which visitors descend into before re-ascending into the main building, similar to the entryway beneath the Louvre Pyramid in Paris.

For the first 5 decades of its operation, general admission to the MSI was free, although certain exhibits (such as the Coal Mine and U-505) required small fees. General entrance fees were first charged in the early 1990s, with general admission rates increasing from $13 in 2008 to $18 in 2015 and $25.95 in 2024.Many "free days"—for Illinois residents only—are offered throughout the year.

=== Renaming ===
On October 3, 2019, the museum announced that it intended to change its name to the Kenneth C. Griffin Museum of Science and Industry, after a donation of $125 million from billionaire Kenneth C. Griffin. It is the largest single gift in the museum's history, effectively doubling its endowment. However, president and chief executive officer David Mosena said the formal name change could take some time, due to the legal complexity of the process. He also said part of the gift will go into funding "a state-of-the-art digital gallery and performance space that will be the only experience of its kind in North America." Chevy Humphrey became president and CEO of the private, non-profit museum in January 2021.

The new name was officially unveiled on May 19, 2024, alongside an updated logo. Due to Griffin's conservative political views, the name change drew criticism from some in the community. Specifically, some were upset that Griffin had offloaded many of his Chicago properties and moved his family to Miami due to the city of Chicago's politics and crime rates.

In 2025, the Driehaus Foundation, which has interests in preserving neo-classical architecture, announced its largest capital grant to date of $10 million to help fund the renovation of the museum's south entrance accessibility and new public amenity spaces. The south portico with platforms and steps down to the Jackson Park lagoon was the building's main entrance during the world's fair when it was built in the 1890s. The south entrance also faces toward the nearby Barack Obama Presidential Center part of the Museum Campus South.

== Exhibits ==
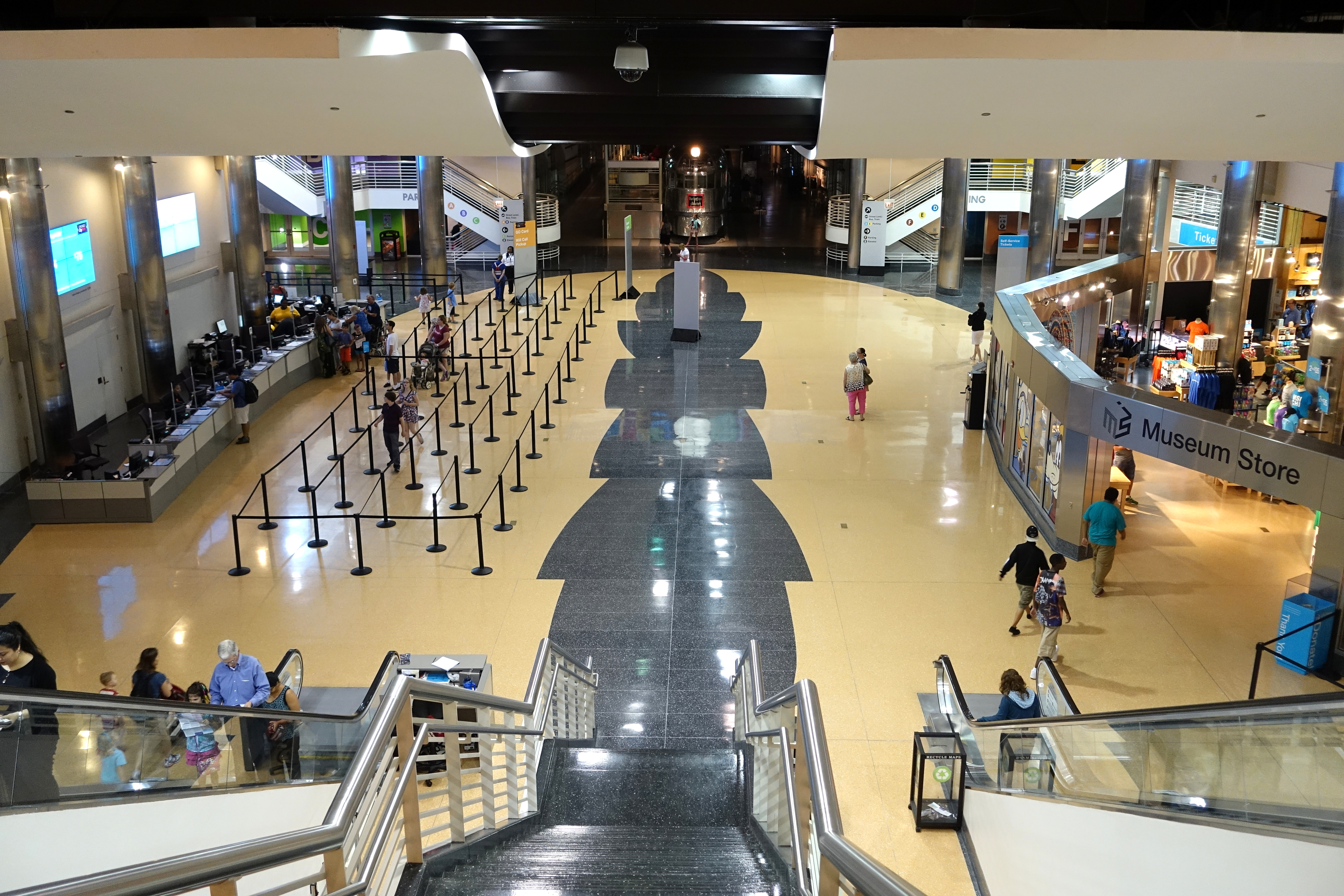
Admissions and museum store

The museum has over 2,000 exhibits, displayed in 75 major halls. Many of the major exhibits are permanent or semi-permanent. Access to the Coal Mine, U-505 on-board tour, and other special exhibits requires an additional fee, while other exhibits require a free timed-entry ticket. In keeping with Rosenwald's vision for the museum, many of the exhibits are interactive.

=== Entry Hall ===
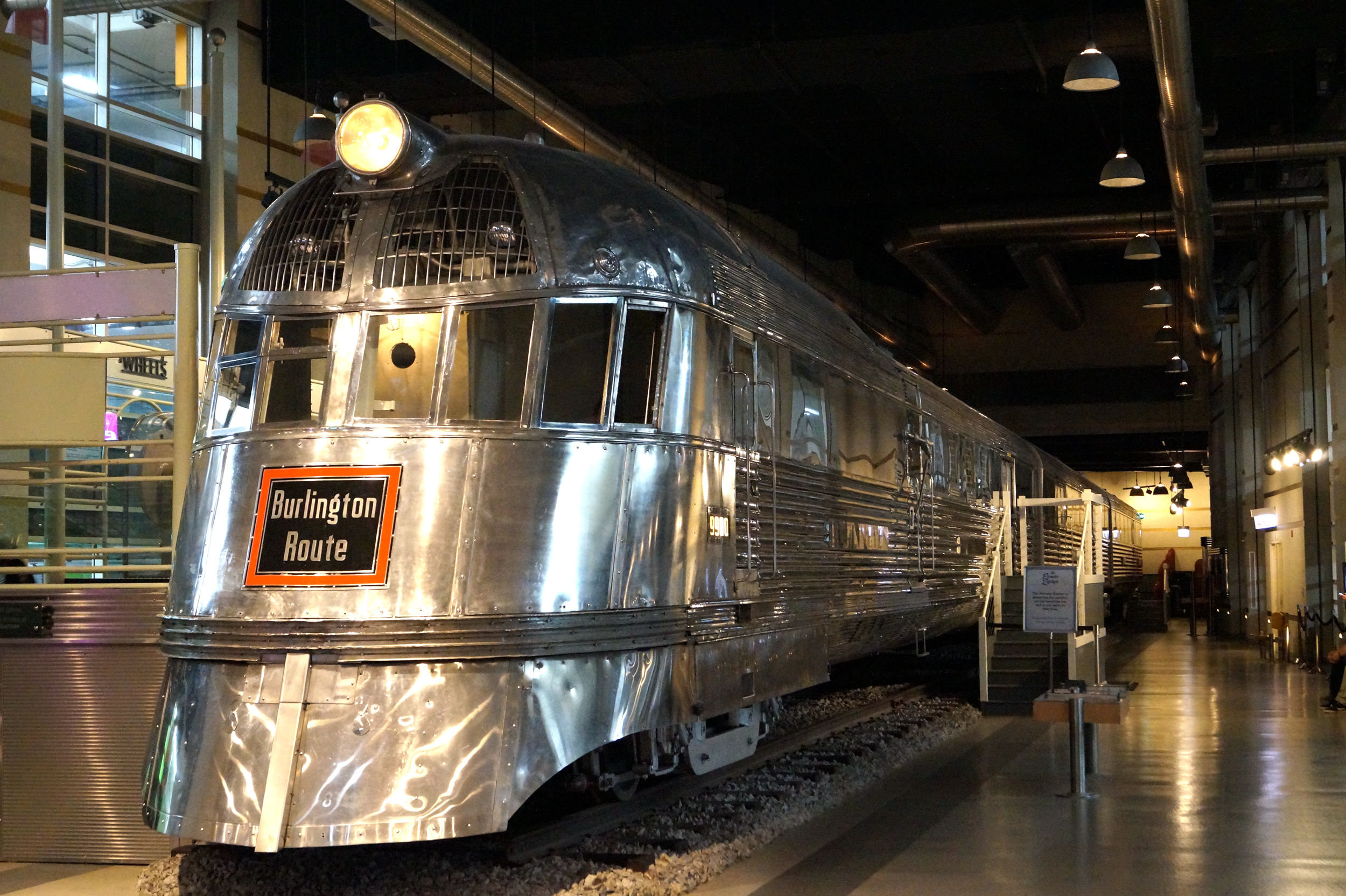
The Pioneer Zephyr

==== Pioneer Zephyr ====
The first diesel-powered, streamlined stainless-steel passenger train, the Pioneer Zephyr, is on permanent display in the Entry Hall (previously the Great Hall, renamed in 2008). The train was previously displayed outdoors, before being relocated indoors during the construction of the museum's underground parking lot in the 1990s.

==== NASCAR Next Gen 2023 Ford Mustang ====
Added to the Entry Hall to coincide with the first NASCAR Chicago Street Race, the Next Gen Ford Mustang is painted by local Chicago artists Paint The city, and showcases modern race-car engineering. It closed in June 2025.

=== Lower level ===
==== U-505 ====
German submarine U-505 is one of just six German submarines captured by the Allies during World War II, and, since its arrival in 1954, the only one on display in the Western Hemisphere. The U-505 exhibit was dedicated as a permanent war memorial by the museum in 1954, and the submarine was designated a National Historic Landmark in 1989.

For its first 50 years at the museum, U-505 was displayed outdoors. Starting in 2004, the U-boat was newly restored and incorporated into its current indoor exhibit, which opened as The New U-505 Experience on June 5, 2005. An enclosure was built around the boat, which was not moved during the renovation. The submarine is now located in a large concrete bunker at the end of the multi-floor exhibit, alongside various artifacts found aboard, as well as interactive games related to the operation of a submarine. Guided tours of the submarine's interior are offered for an additional fee.

Located outside the entrance to the exhibit, there is both a Mold-A-Rama machine and a penny flattening device with U-505 designs.

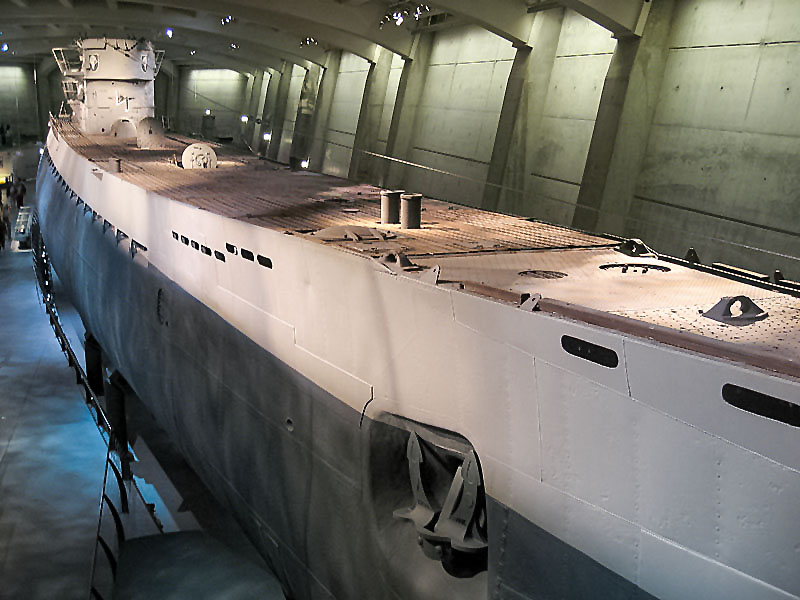
German submarine U-505

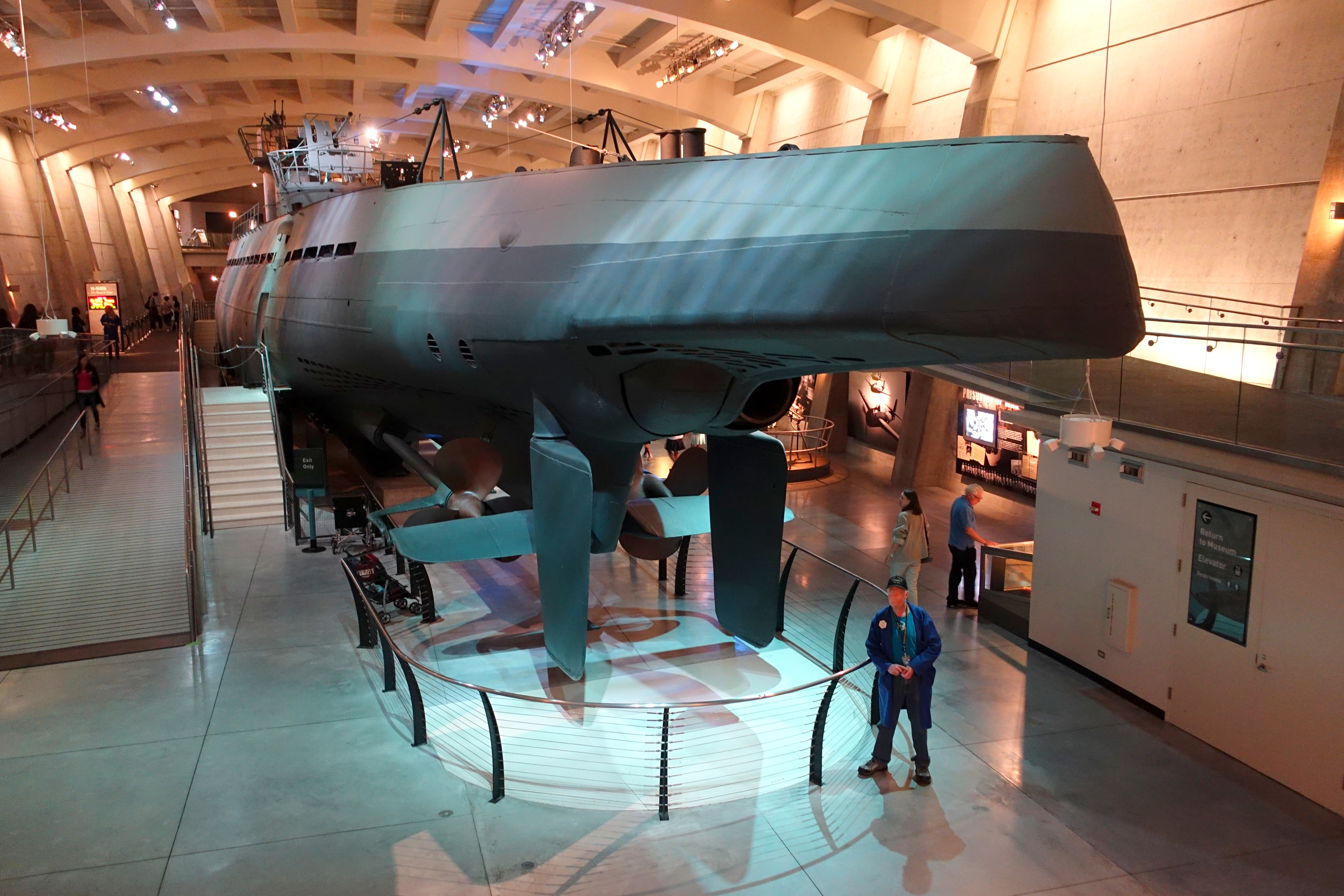
View of propellers and rudders

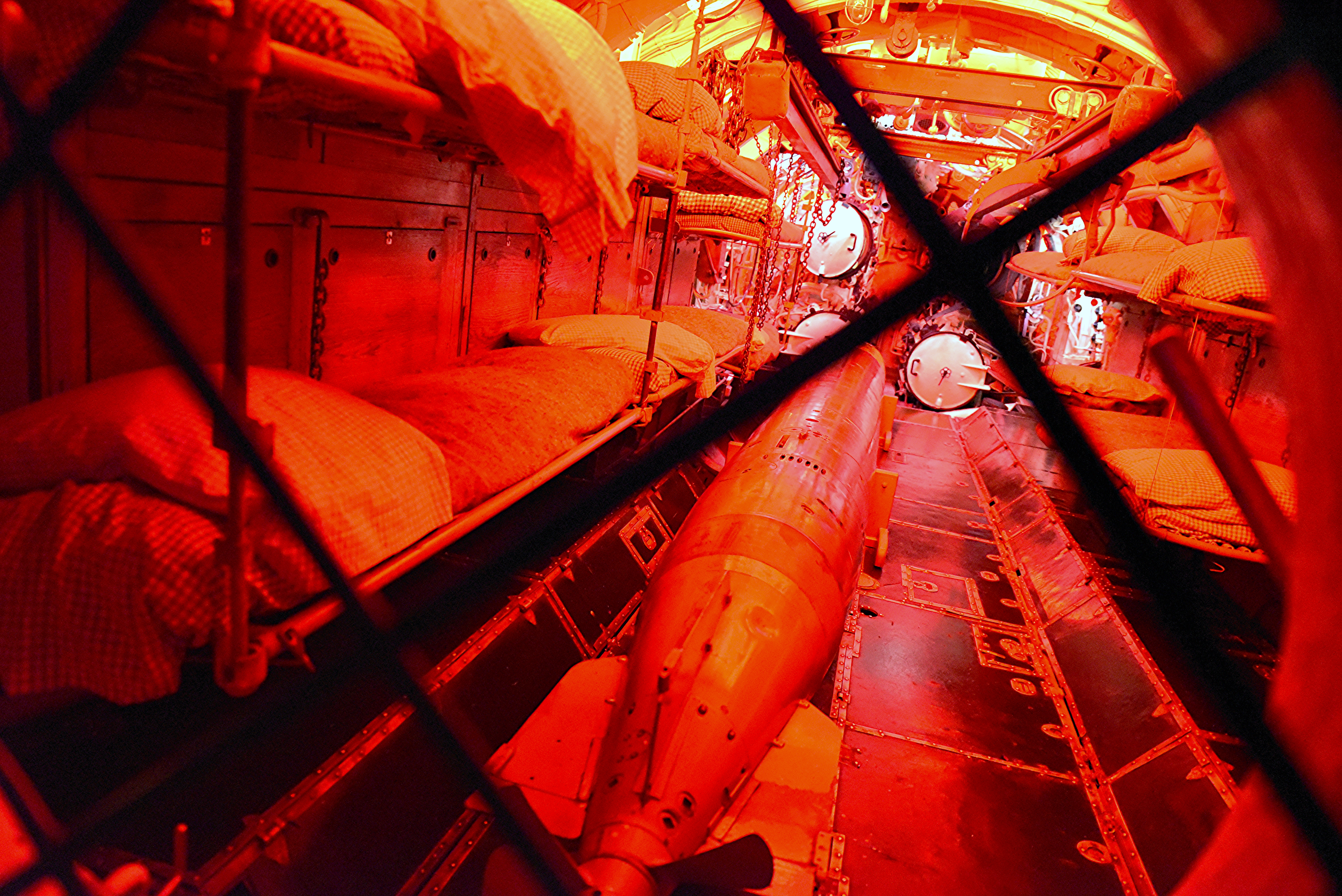
Crew bunks shared with a torpedo

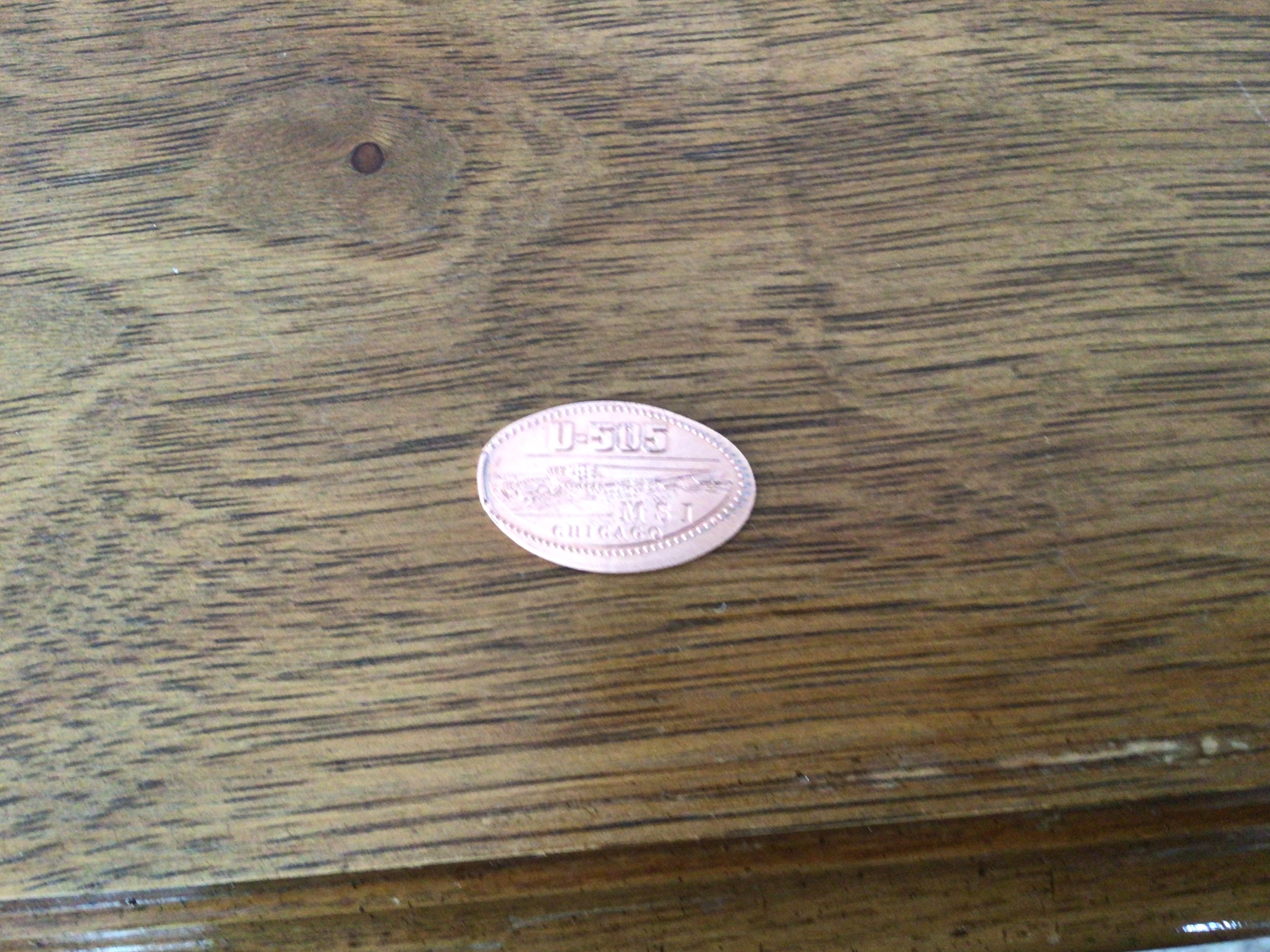
A U-505 flattened US penny from the MSI

==== Henry Crown Space Center ====
MSI's Henry Crown Space Center is located in its own connected wing on the building's southeast side. It opened in 1986, and was extensively renovated and reopened in 2024.

The Space Center includes the Apollo 8 command module, which flew the first human beings around the Moon; the Mercury-Atlas 7 capsule which flew the second American to orbit the Earth; a NASA lunar module trainer used to test procedures for the Apollo lunar landings, and a SpaceX Dragon 1 cargo spacecraft.

Located in the Henry Crown Space Center is the Giant Dome Theater, a domed theater which shows movies on a 5-story wrap-around screen of perforated aluminum (allowing the speakers to be mounted behind the screen and heard throughout the theater).

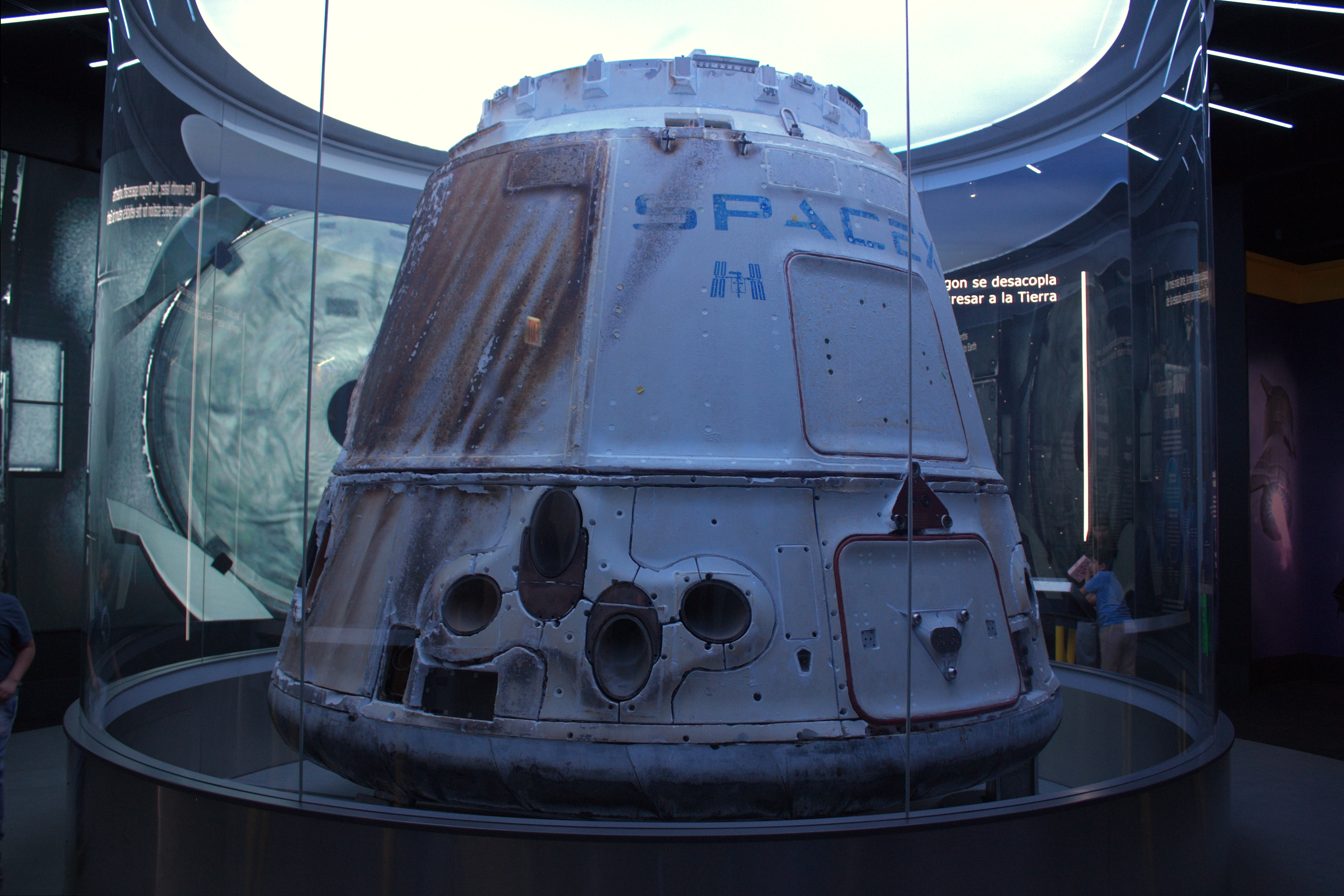
SpaceX Dragon 1 C113

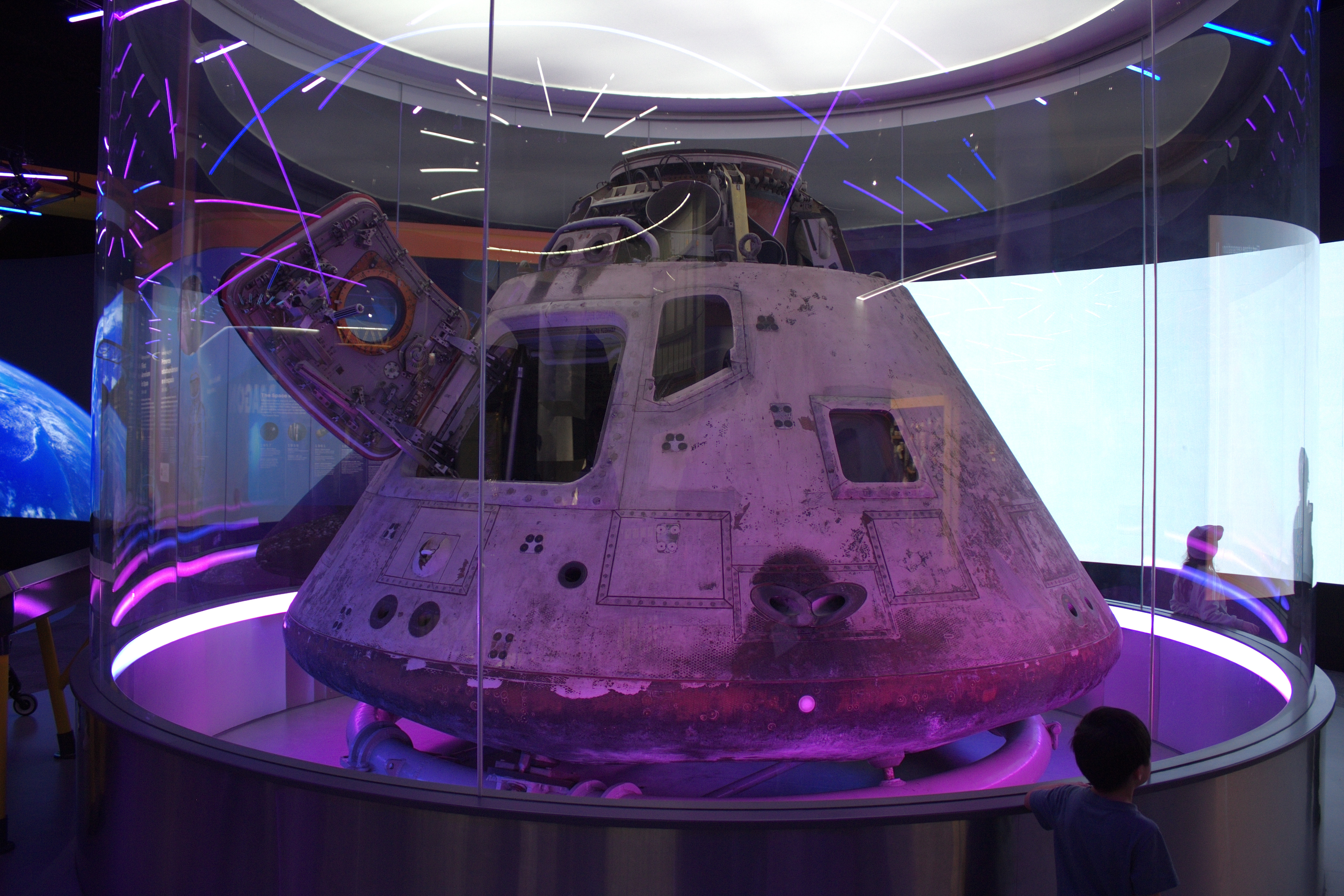
Apollo 8 Command Module

==== FarmTech ====
The FarmTech exhibit showcases modern agricultural techniques and how farmers use modern technology like GPS systems to improve work on the farm, and includes a tractor and a combine harvester from John Deere. The exhibit also showcases a greenhouse, a mock-up of a kitchen showcasing how much of the food we eat comes from soybeans, and how we use cows, from energy to what we drink.

==== Other ====
The west wing of the museum's lower level includes two transportation exhibits, one displaying models of "Ships Through the Ages" and the other a collection of historic racing cars.

The lower level includes a number of single-room exhibits. Black Creativity: Architecture covers the history of Black architects, as part of the museum's wider Black Creativity initiative.

Mold-A-Rama™: Molded for the Future showcases several Mold-A-Rama machines and the history and mechanics of injection-molded plastics manufacturing.[25] Colleen Moore's Fairy Castle, an intricate miniature fantasy house with decorations inspired by folklore and fairy tales, is also on display, having been at the museum since 1949.[26][27] 90 and Beyond opened in 2023 to celebrate MSI's 90th anniversary, and showcases objects from each of the 9 decades in the museum's history.[28]

There are multiple exhibits on the lower level aimed at younger children, including the Swiss Jollyball, a kinetic art rolling ball sculpture built by a British man in Switzerland using nothing but salvaged junk, which showcases a metal ball moving on a track (described by the museum as a "pinball machine". The Idea Factory, a toddler water table play area; and the Eye Spy gallery, a hallway with humorous tableaus behind windows.

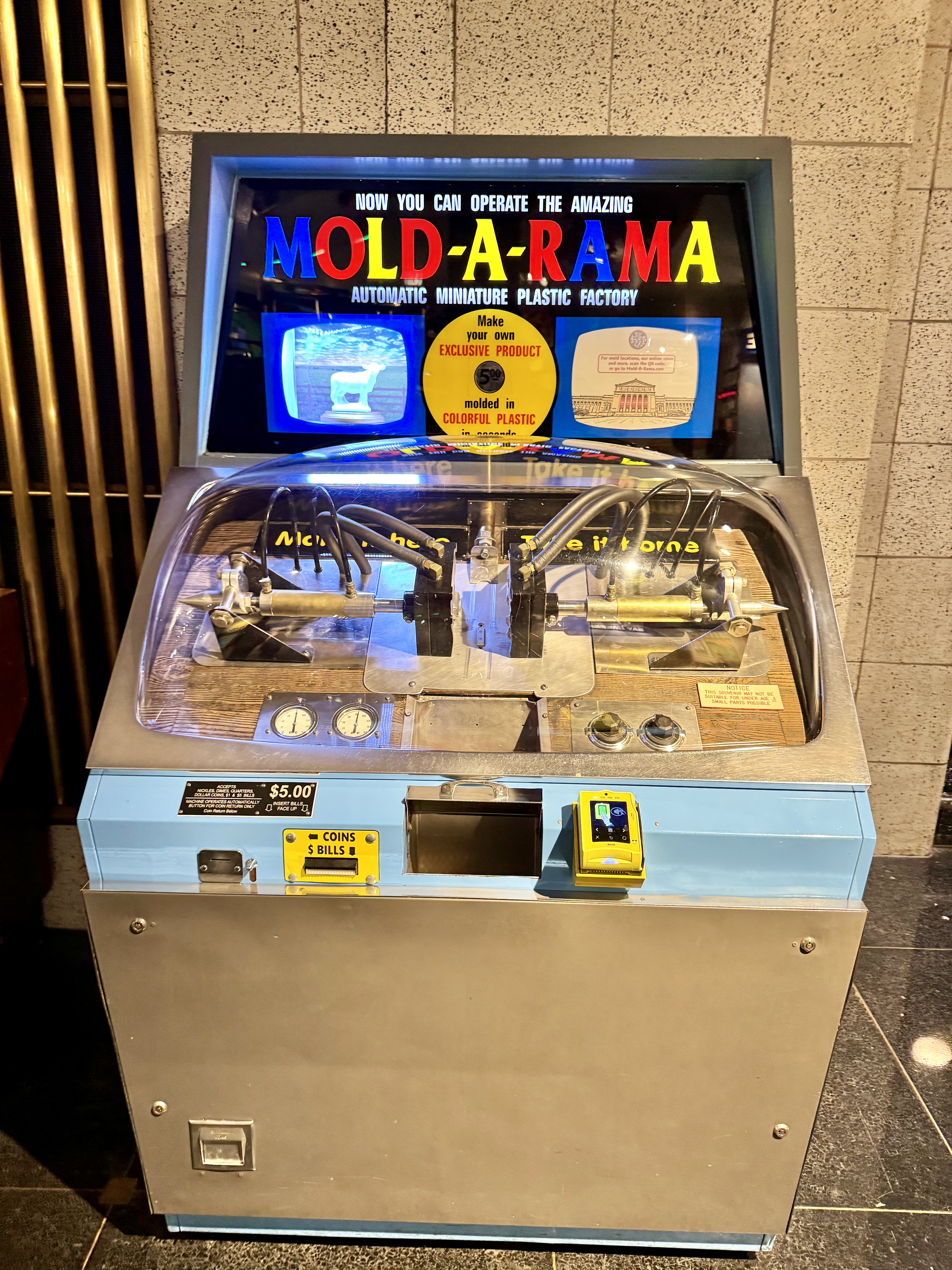
Mold-A-Rama machine

A tractor from a Mold-A-Rama

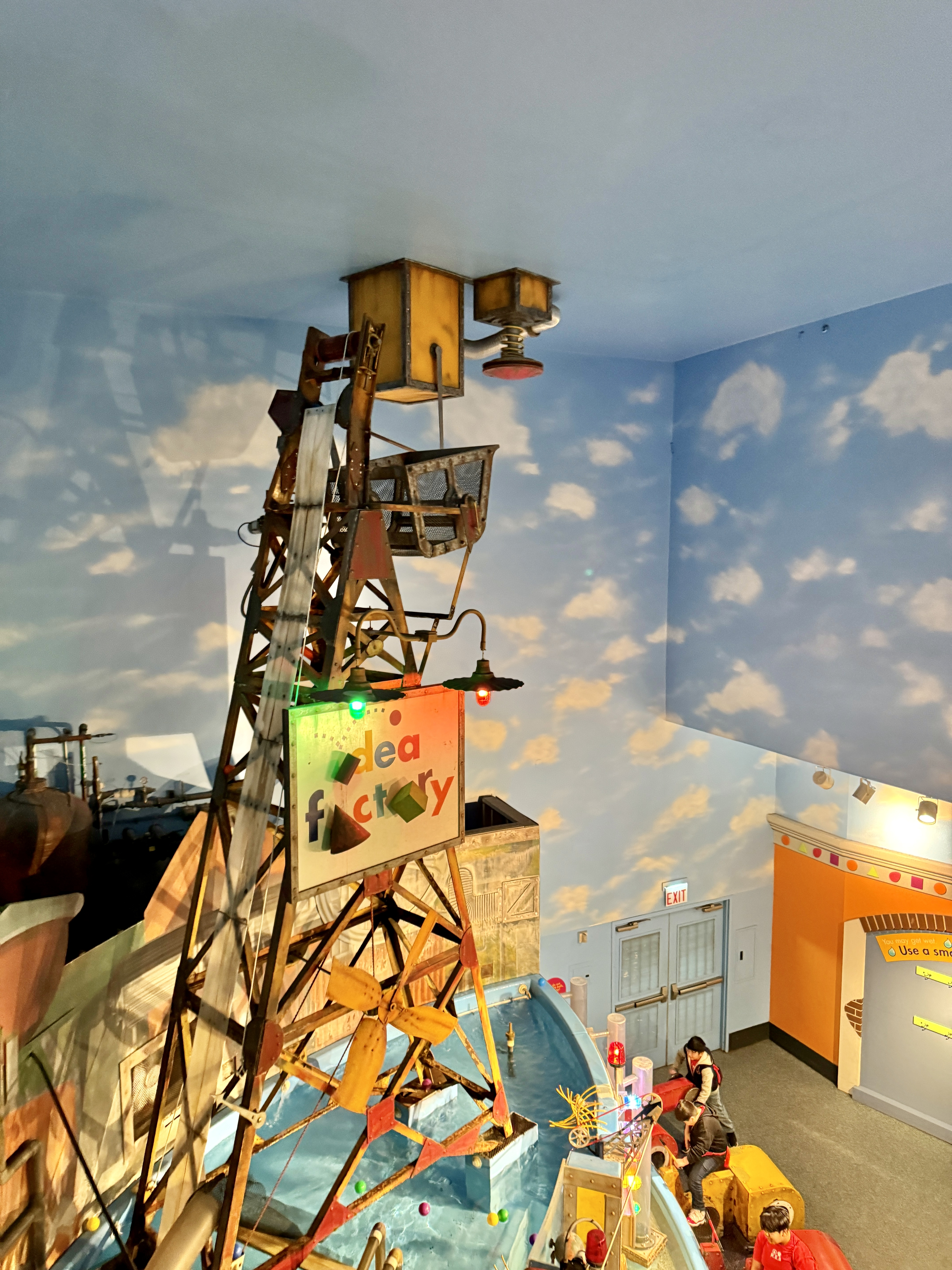
Idea Factory

=== First level ===
==== Transportation Gallery ====
The Transportation Gallery, located in the east wing of the museum on the first and second levels, contains several permanent exhibits:

- In the middle of the wing is The Great Train Story, a 3,500-square-foot (330 m^{2}) HO-scale model railroad which recreates an embellished version of the Empire Builder rail line from Chicago to Seattle, with sections depicting downtown Chicago, the Chicago suburbs, the Great Plains, the Rocky Mountains and the Cascades, and downtown Seattle with a cargo port.
- In the main level of the gallery is NYC & HRR Locomotive No. 999, known as the Empire State Express, which is alleged by some sources to have been the first steam locomotive in the world to exceed 100 miles per hour (160 km/h). It was donated to the museum in 1962, and displayed outside until being moved indoors and restored in 1993.
- The first level of the Transportation Gallery also includes a replica of Stephenson's Rocket, which was the first steam locomotive to exceed 25 miles per hour; as well as several carriages and cars showcasing historic and modern road vehicles.
- The second level of the Transportation Gallery consists of the Take Flight exhibit, which features the first Boeing 727 jet plane in commercial service, donated by United Airlines, with one wing removed and holes cut on the fuselage to facilitate visitor access. A formerly-working replica of the Wright Brothers' first airplane, the Wright Flyer, is also on display.
- Two World War II warplanes are also exhibited, both donated by the British government: a German Ju 87 R-2/Trop. Stuka dive-bomber—one of only two fully-intact Stukas left in the world—and a British Mark 1A Supermarine Spitfire.
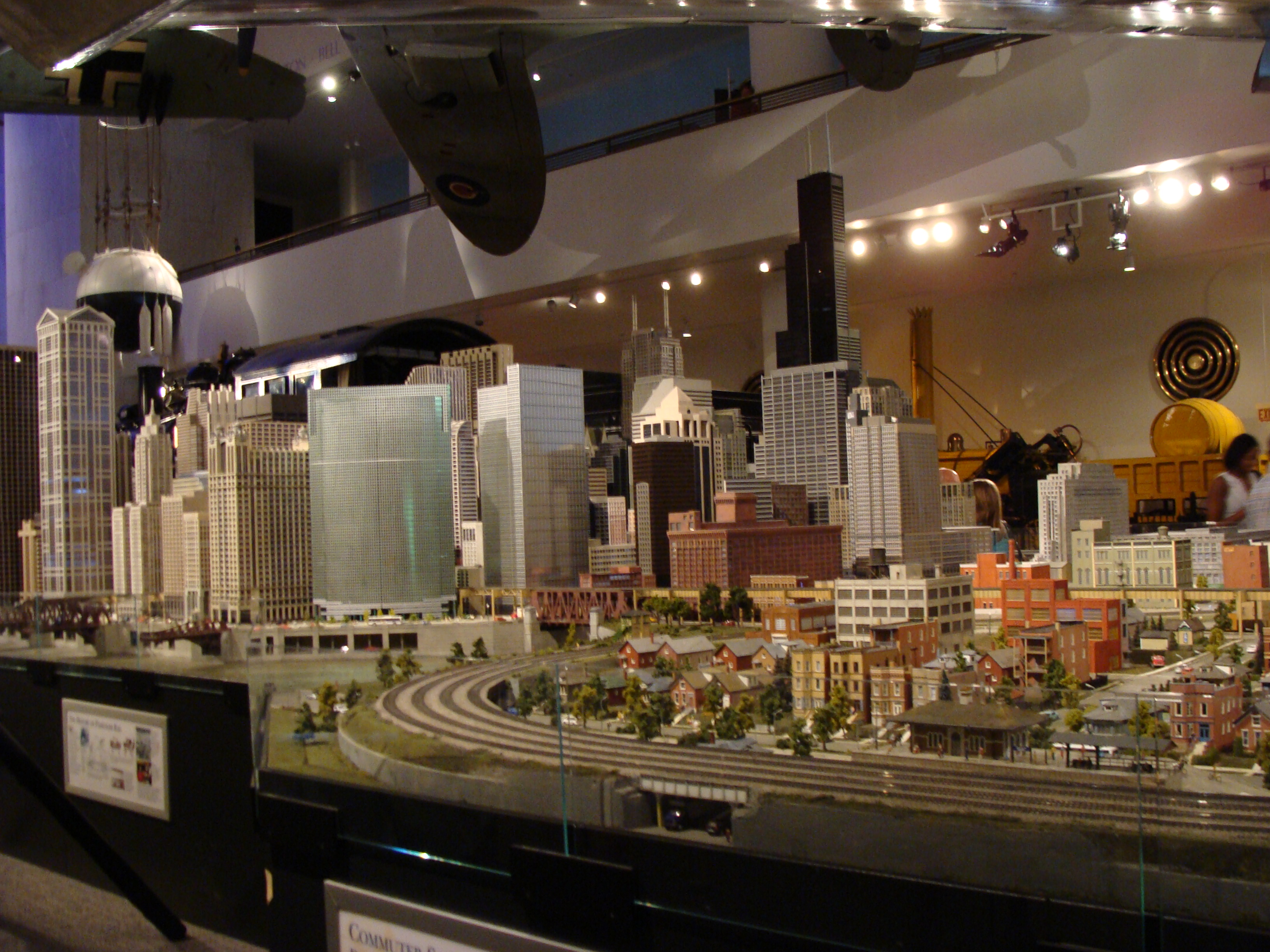
The Great Train Story

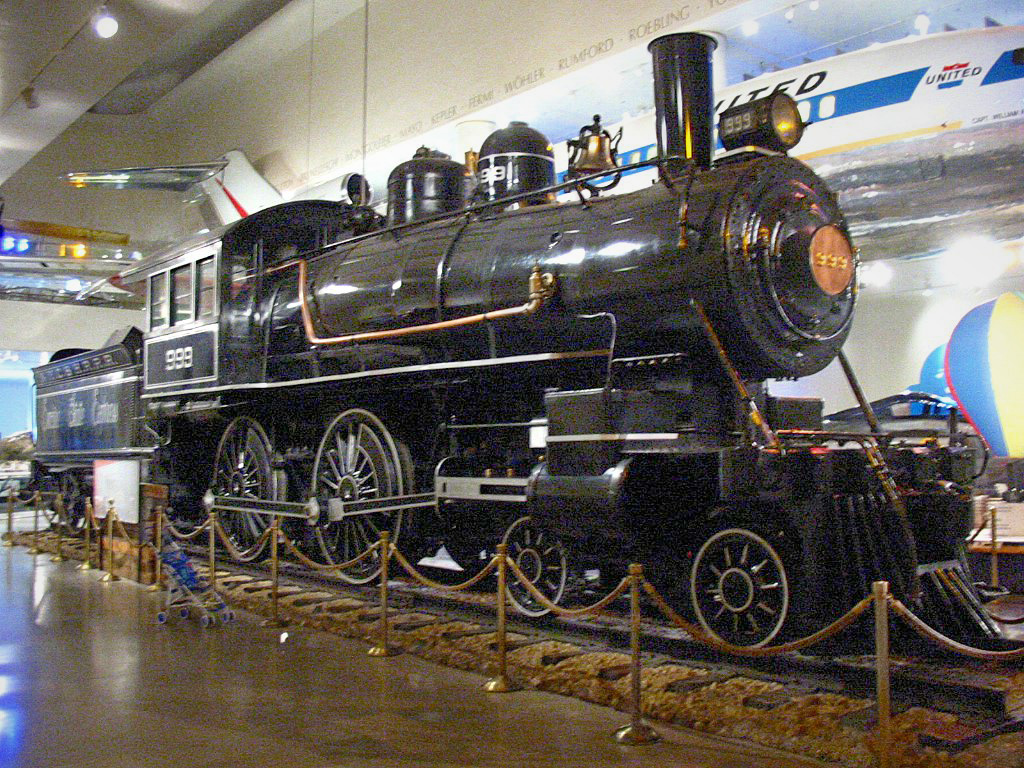
New York Central and Hudson River Railroad No. 999

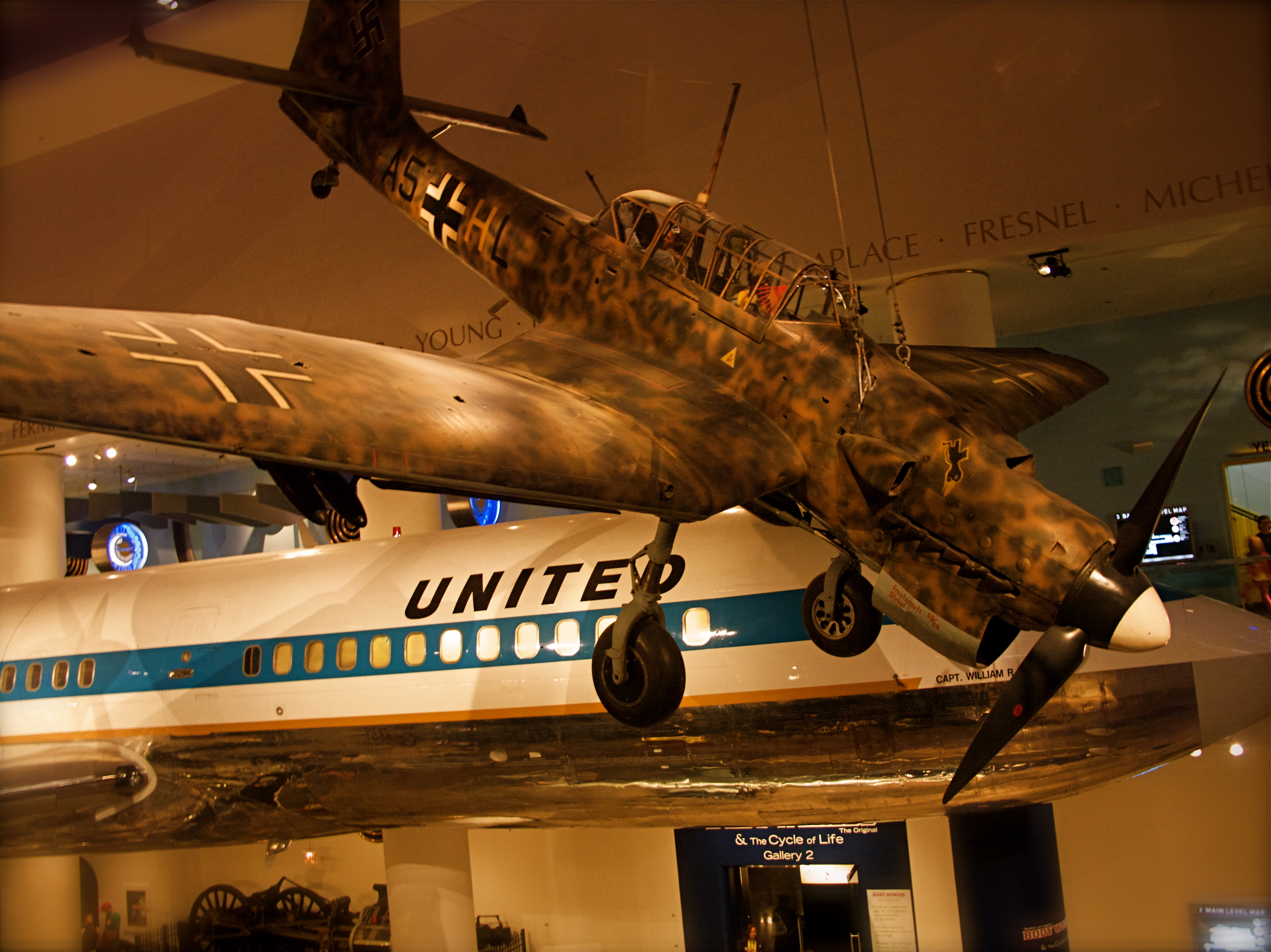
Junkers Ju 87 "Stuka"

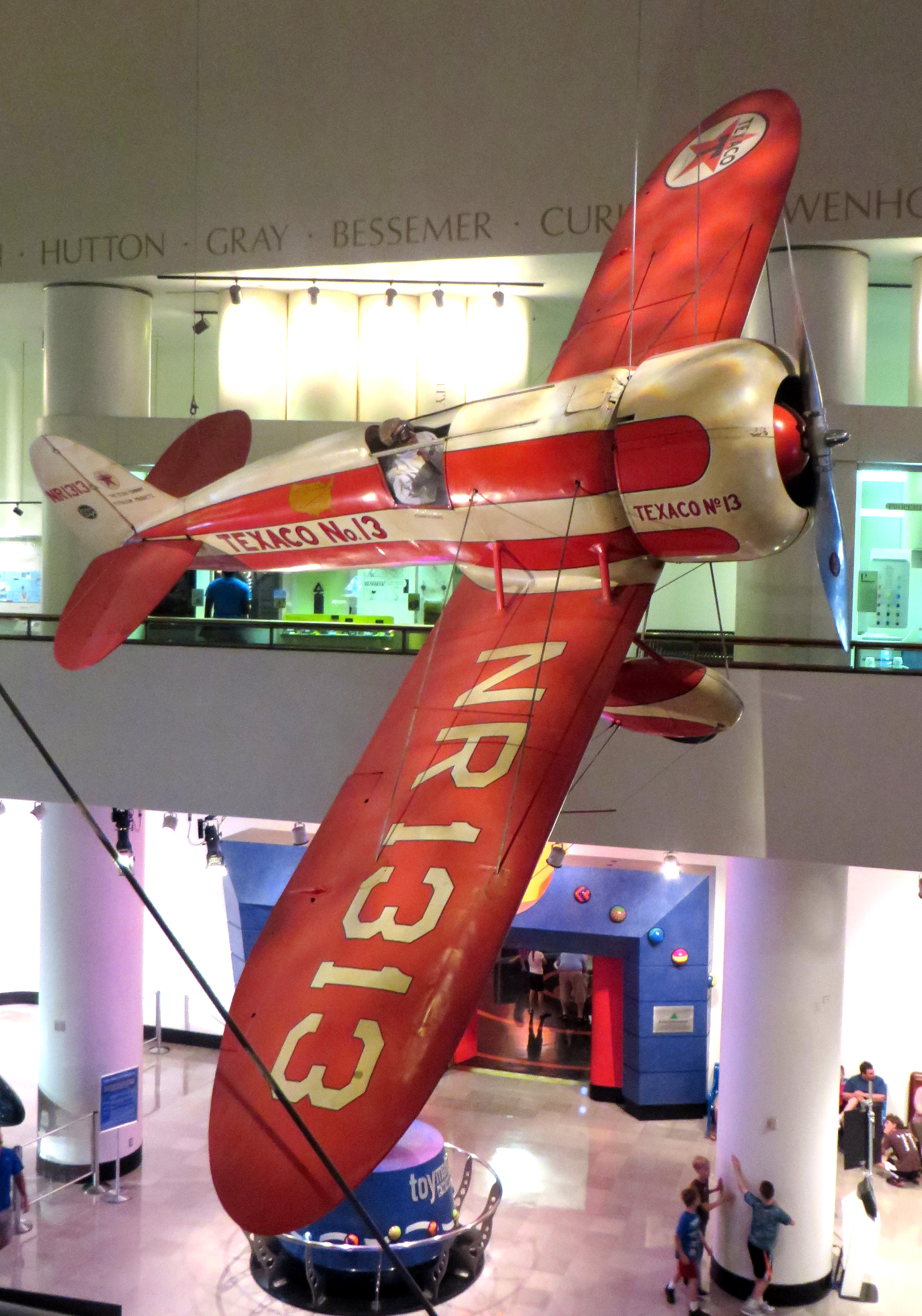
Travel Air Type R "Texaco 13"

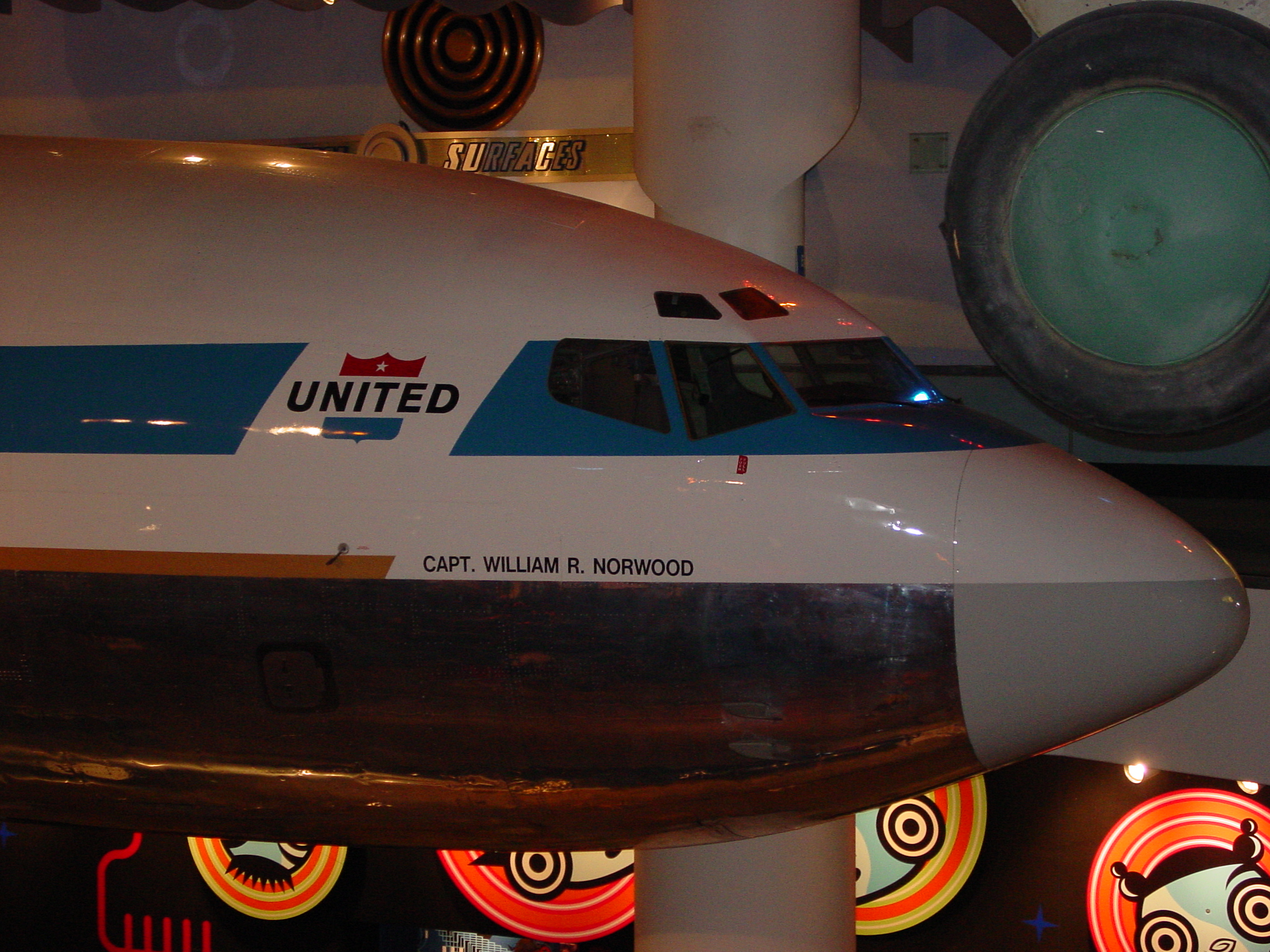
Boeing 727

==== Science Storms ====
Opened in March 2010, Science Storms is a permanent multi-level exhibit which occupies the Allstate Court on the west side of the museum. On the first level it features a 40-foot (12-meter) water vapor tornado vortex, a rotating sand avalanche disk, a Foucault pendulum suspended from the ceiling, a tsunami wave tank, tethered hot air balloons, a heliostat system with solar panel-powered cars, and a section about light and color; on the second level it features a Tesla coil mounted to the ceiling which fires approximately every 30 minutes, a Wimshurst machine built by James Wimshurst in the late 19th century, a giant Newton's cradle, and sections on fire, chemistry, and magnetism.

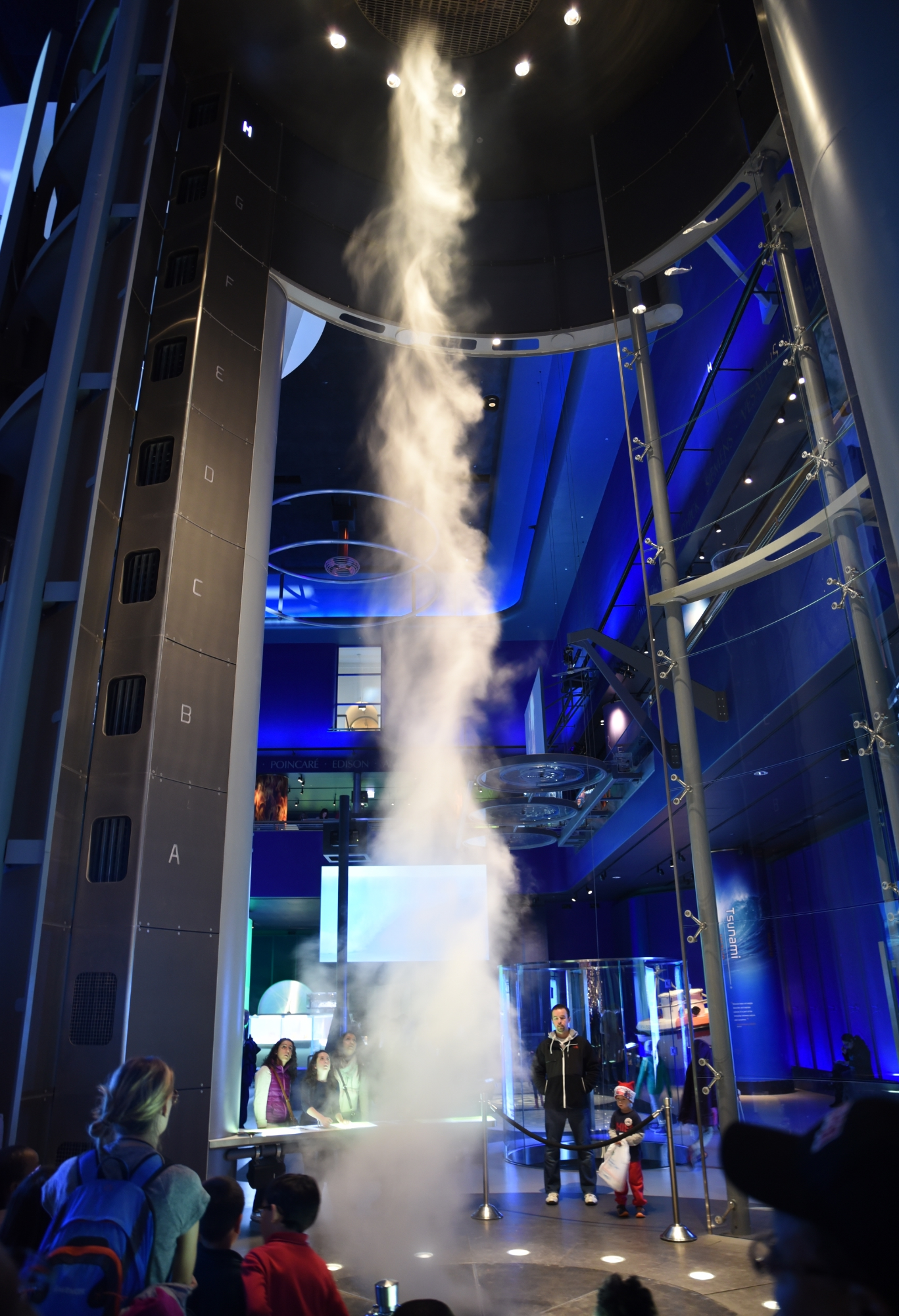
Tornado vortex

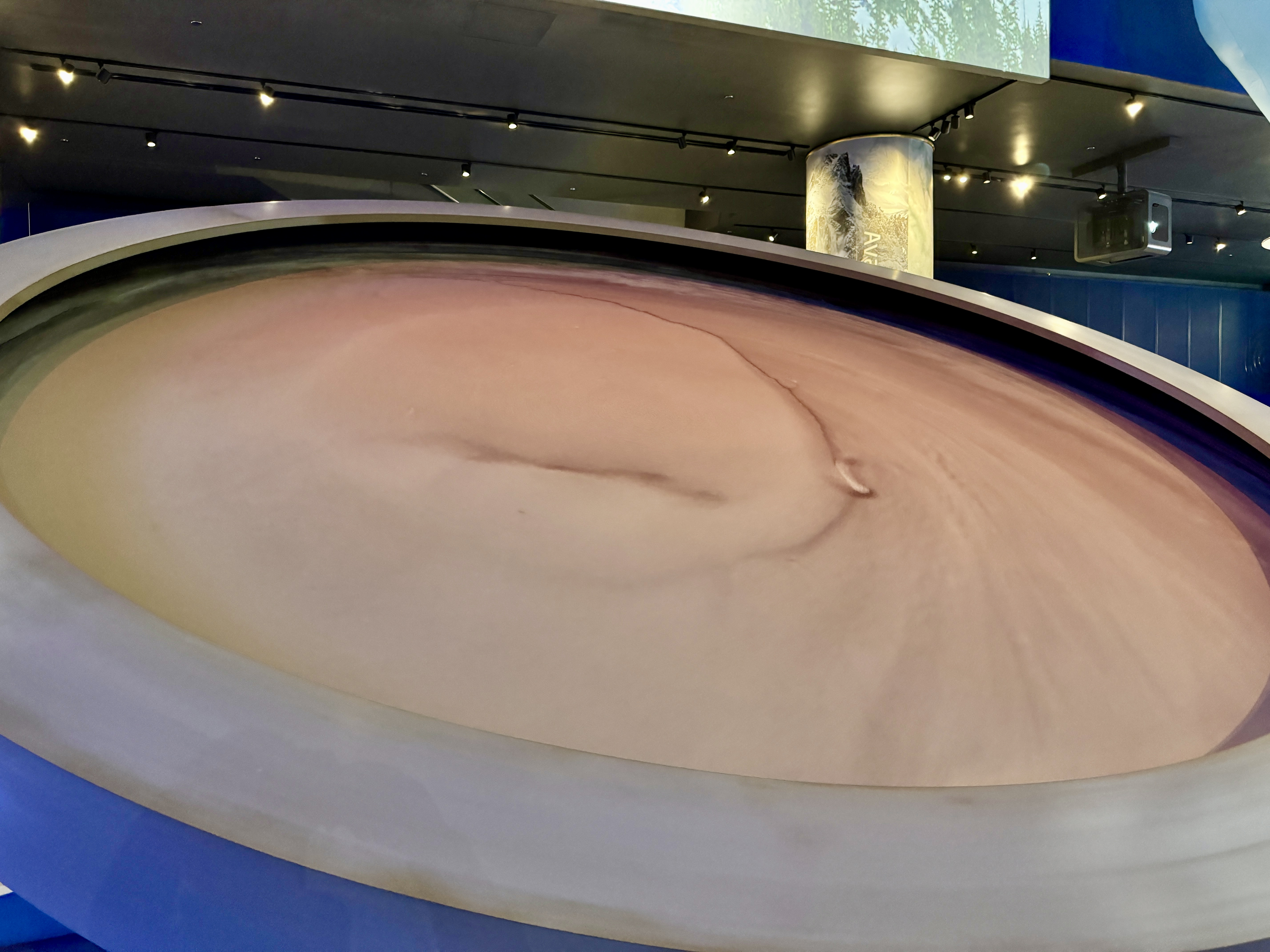
Rotating sand

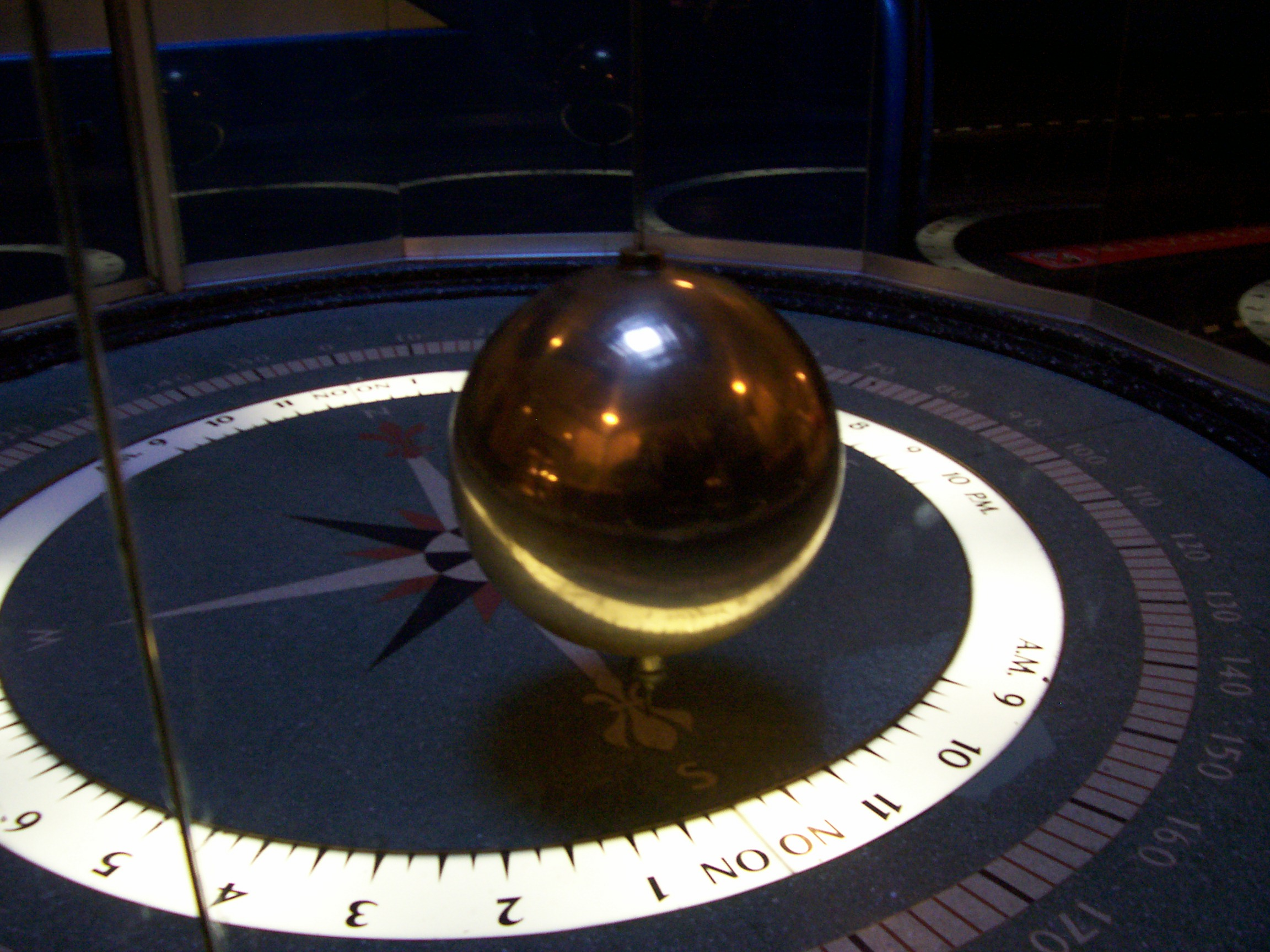
Foucault pendulum

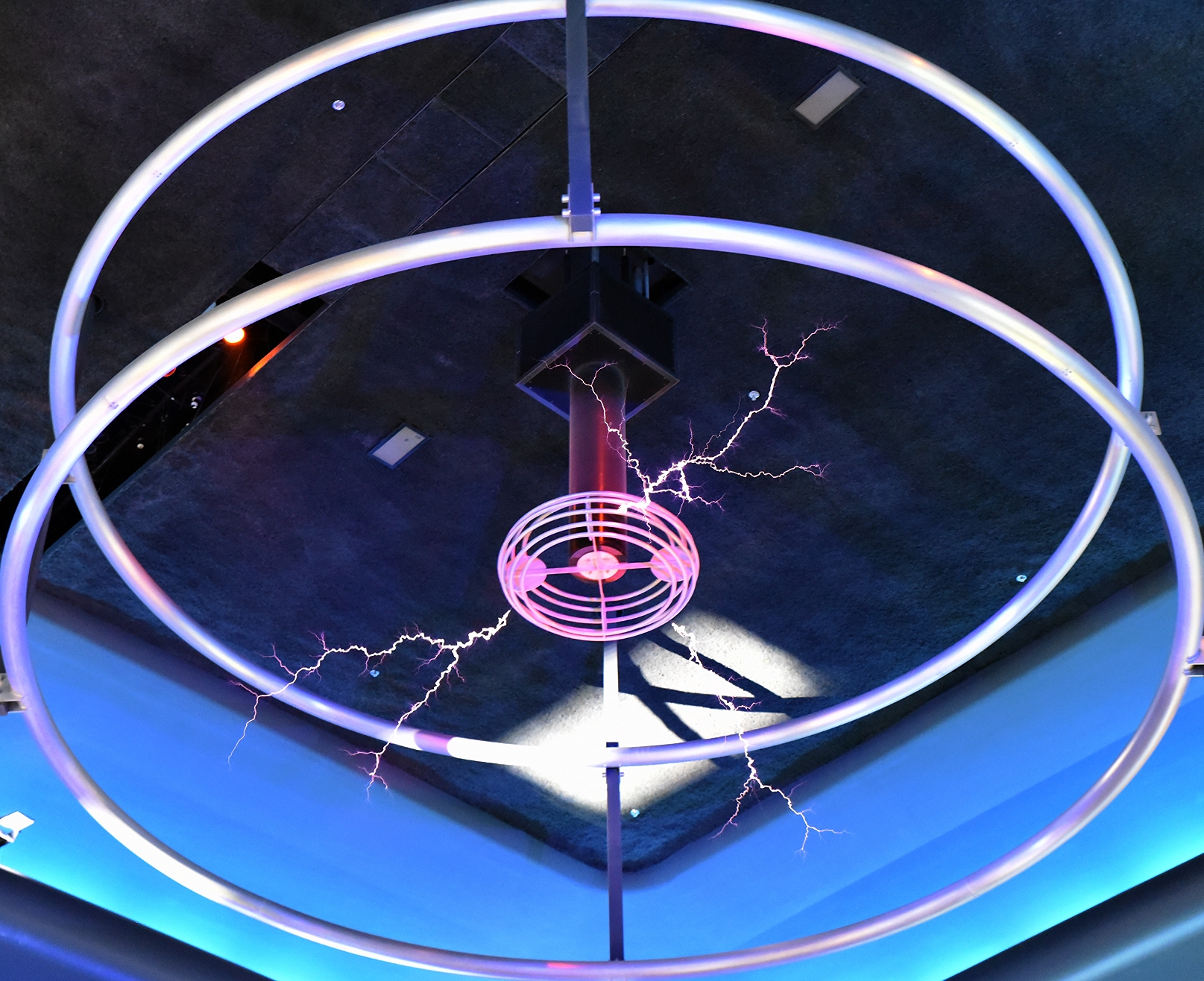
Tesla coil

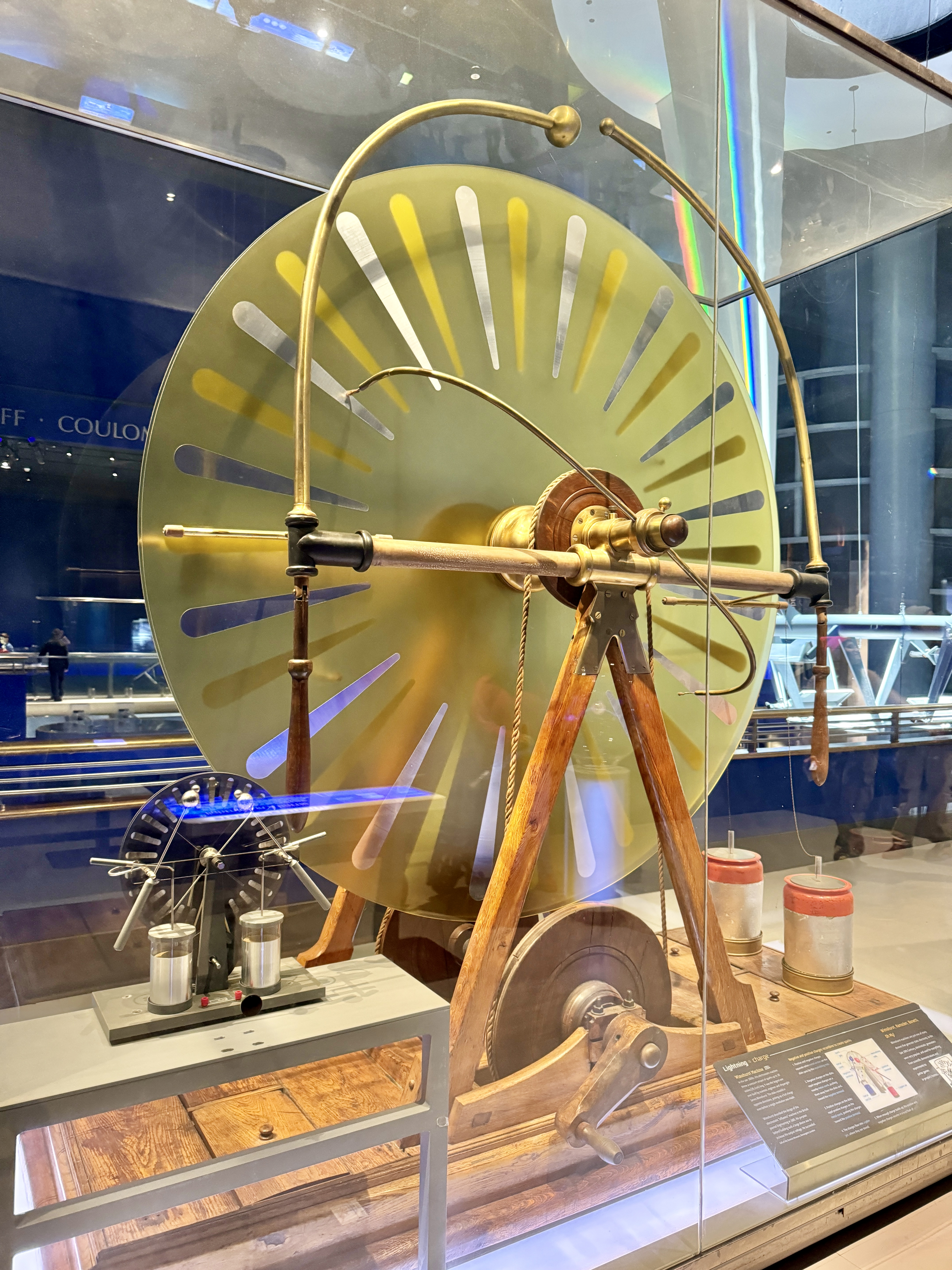
Wimshurst machine

==== Coal Mine ====
Located in and beneath the south end of the museum's Central Pavilion, The Coal Mine re-creates a working deep-shaft bituminous coal mine, using original equipment from Old Ben #17, a mine in Johnston City, Illinois which closed in 1923. It is the museum's oldest exhibit, opening with MSI in 1933. Visitors are led through the exhibit by one or more "coal miner" guides, including a ride on a genuine mine train, and learn the history of unions and the science of coal mining and other types of energy production. The experience takes around 30 minutes and requires an additional fee.

==== Griffin Studio & Notes to Neurons ====
Opened in 2024, the Kenneth C. Griffin Studio (or simply Griffin Studio) is an "immersive multimedia experience" with projections, sound, and movement recognition, intended to rotate presentations throughout its life. Its first and current presentation is entitled Notes to Neurons, and examines how music interacts with the human mind and body.

==== Numbers in Nature: A Mirror Maze ====
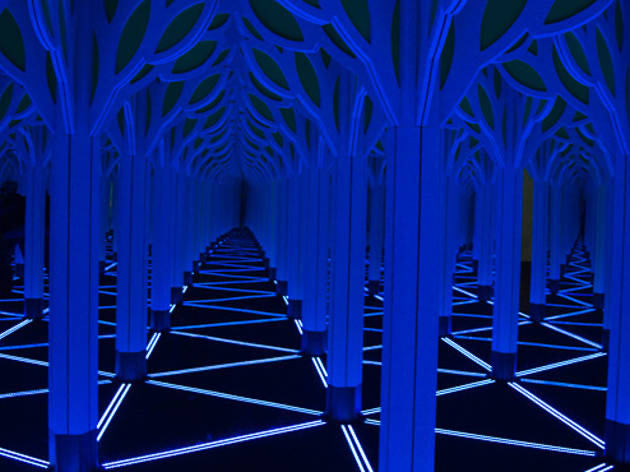
Inside the Mirror Maze.

Numbers in Nature: A Mirror Maze contains interactive stations to learn about patterns in nature, including the Golden Ratio, spirals, fractal branching, and Voronoi patterns.

It also contains a mirror maze as a demonstration of geometric patterns. The exhibit requires a free timed entry ticket.[36]

==== The Blue Paradox ====
The Blue Paradox is an immersive exhibit discussing the ocean plastics crisis which opened on July 1, 2023. Before being relocated to MSI, it was originally a pop-up experience in London, and is sponsored by S.C. Johnson.

==== Genetics: Decoding Life ====
Genetics: Decoding Life looks at how genetics affect human and animal development, as well as containing a chick hatchery composed of an incubator where baby chickens hatch from their eggs and a chick pen for those that have already hatched, as well as housing genetically modified frogs, mice, and drought resistant plants. In 2025, the exhibit was permanently closed, and the chicks were moved to the FarmTech exhibit

The chick hatchery has been part of the museum since 1956.

About 20 chicks are hatched a day, around 140 hatch in a week, and up to 8000 hatch in a year. At one time, chicks would be collected by Lincoln Park Zoo to be fed to various animals, including lions, crocodiles, snakes, vultures, owls and tigers. This partnership between the museum and the zoo operated for decades, with about 7000 chicks being sent to the zoo each year. Some of the chicks hatched are of the Java species of chicken, and these are sent to a farm in La Fox, Illinois that works to preserve the rare breed.[40][41] There have been numerous efforts to shut down the exhibit, as early as 1998 and as recent as 2017.[42] The exhibit was eventually closed in 2025, and as a result the baby chicks were eventually relocated to the Farm Tech exhibit.

==== Yesterday's Main Street ====
Yesterday's Main Street is a mock-up of a Chicago street from the early 20th century, complete with a cobblestone roadway, old-fashioned light fixtures, fire hydrants, and several shops, including the precursors to several Chicago-based businesses. Included are:

- The Berghoff restaurant
- Chicago Post Office
- Commonwealth Edison
- Gossard Corset Shop
- Jewel Tea Company grocery
- Jenner and Block Law office
- Lytton's Clothing Store
- Dr. John B. Murphy's office
- The Nickelodeon Cinema
- Chas. A. Stevens & Co.
- Walgreens Drug Company

Unlike the other shops, the Nickelodeon Cinema can be entered and is functional, and plays silent films throughout the day.

==== ToyMaker 3000 ====
ToyMaker 3000 is a working assembly line which lets visitors order a "Gravitron" spinning top toy and watch as it is assembled.

==== Wanger Family Fab Lab ====
The Wanger Family Fab Lab (or simply "Fab Lab") is a digital fabrication facility with 3D-printers, laser-cutters, and various other tools and technologies used to create "almost anything you can imagine." It is visible through windows, but not accessible to the general public, and is used by museum-sponsored workshops and summer camps.

==== Other ====
Extreme Ice is an exhibit showcasing the effect of climate change on Earth's polar ice caps, including climate survey equipment, interactive screens, and a large ice wall which visitors can touch.

Opened in spring 2013, The Art of the Bicycle showcases the history of bicycles, and how modern bikes continue to evolve.

Earth Revealed centers around a "Science on a Sphere" holographic projection globe, and has presentations about planetary science, space exploration, and movies about rising sea levels and water use.

The Whispering Gallery, which opened in 1938, is a room shaped to reflect sound.

=== Second level ===
==== YOU! The Experience ====
YOU! The Experience uses more than 50 interactive stations to teach about what goes on in your body, among them a 13-foot-tall, animated 3-D heart beating in time with yours or jogging in a human-sized hamster wheel.

==== Periodic Table ====
The Regenstein Hall of Chemistry includes a giant periodic table of the elements with samples of each element as well as cases displaying food and materials science.

==== Mystery Ship ====
On display hanging above the Coal Mine exhibit is the Travel Air Type R Mystery Ship, nicknamed "Texaco 13", an airplane which set many world records in flying.

==== Simulators ====
Located in the rear of the Take Flight exhibit is a series of flight simulators that allow visitors to fly historic fighter aircraft, and motion simulators that simulate journeys through the sky and space.

=== Notable former exhibits ===
An F-104 Starfighter on loan to MSI from the US Air Force since 1978 was sent to the Mid-America Air Museum in Liberal, Kansas, in 1993.

In March 1995, Santa Fe Steam Locomotive 2903 was moved from outside the museum to the Illinois Railway Museum.

Telefun Town, a hall dedicated to the wonders of telephone communication, sponsored by the company then known as the Bell Telephone Company, no longer exists.

One well-known past exhibit was a walk-through model of the human heart, which was removed in 2009 for the construction of YOU! the Experience.

Fast Forward... Inventing the Future, an exhibit about "cutting-edge" technologies such as hydroponics, space manufacturing and telerobotics, closed in 2022 to make way for the Griffin Studio and Notes to Neurons. It was intended as a "rotating gallery", with sections being changed throughout its run at the museum to reflect new technological developments.

Out of the Vault, an exhibit showcasing various objects from MSI's collections, closed in 2022 to make way for The Blue Paradox. The Spaceport, an exhibit about the fantasy and reality of space exploration with uniforms from Star Trek and models of spacecraft on display, also closed in 2022 to make way for The Blue Paradox.

Future Energy Chicago was an exhibit showcasing alternative resources and energy production with a focus on energy use in the future. It opened in September 2013 and closed in August 2022.

== Special exhibitions ==
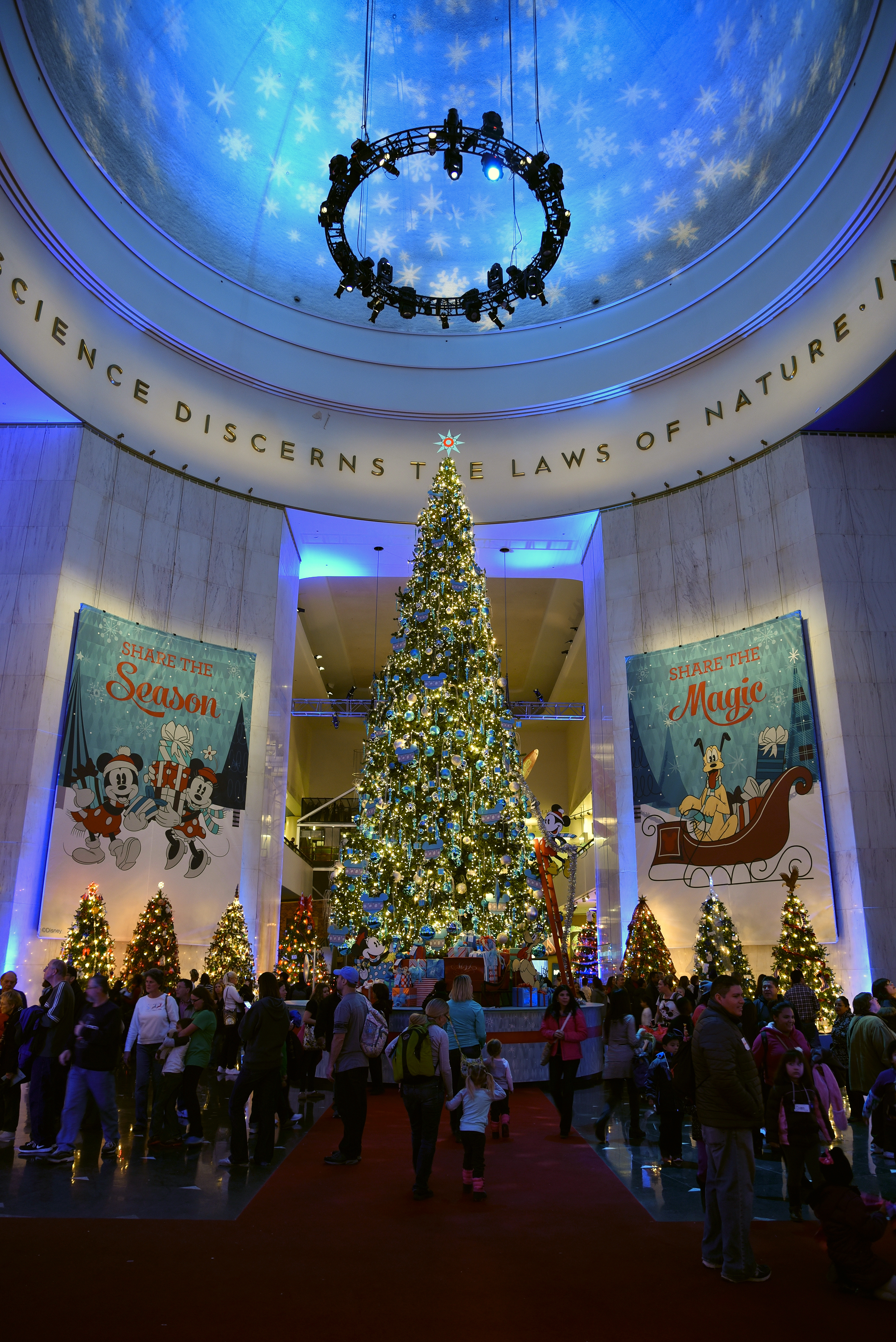
The annual Christmas Around the World exhibit features various pine trees, each decorated in honor or in the traditions of various nations around the world.

In addition to its three floors of standing exhibits, the museum hosts temporary and traveling exhibitions. These exhibitions typically last for less than one year, and usually require a separate paid admission fee.

Past exhibitions at MSI have included:

- Titanic: The Exhibition, which was the largest display of relics from the wreck of RMS Titanic
- Gunther von Hagens's Body Worlds, a view into the human body through use of plastinated human specimens
- Game On, which featured the history and culture of video games
- Leonardo da Vinci: Man, Inventor, Genius
- Body Worlds: Animal Inside Out, part of Gunther von Hagen's Body Worlds series of exhibitions, this time shows the viewing of various animal bodies through the use of plastinated animal specimens
- CSI: The Experience
- Robots Like Us
- City of the Future
- Star Wars: Where Science Meets Imagination
- The Glass Experience: explores the science, everyday uses, and artistry of glass through artifacts and live demonstrations.
- Harry Potter: The Exhibition
- Robot Revolution, which was sponsored by Google and featured numerous hands-on demonstrations and advice from experts for prospective future robot scientists and engineers
- Four installments of Smart Home: Green + Wired, featuring the work of green architect Michelle Kaufmann
- The Science Behind Pixar (opened May 24, 2018)
- Wired to Wear, an exhibit covering wearable technology (opened on March 21, 2019) which, following its run as a temporary exhibition, was reworked into a smaller exhibit and relocated to the museum's upper level for several years.
- Marvel: Universe of Super Heroes (opened March 7, 2021).
- The Art of the Brick (opened February 10, 2022)
- Pompeii: The Exhibition (opened February 23, 2023)
- 007 Science (opened March 7, 2024)

Yearly, from late November to early January, the museum hosts its Christmas Around the World and Holidays of Light exhibitions, featuring Christmas trees from different cultures from around the world and displays about various other cultural holiday celebrations. Started in 1942 with just one tree to honor soldiers fighting in World War Two, the tradition expanded into more than 50 trees.

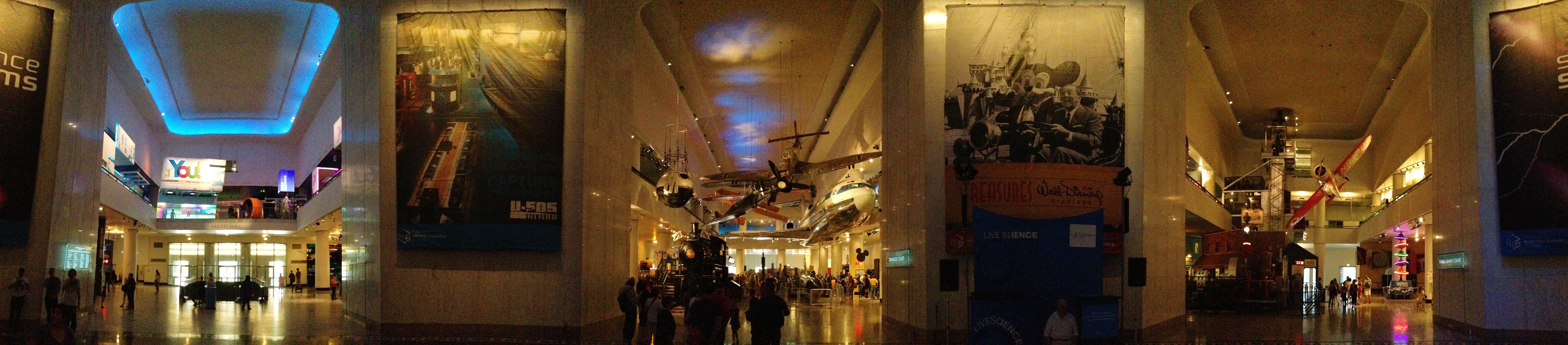
Interior panorama, viewed from a central hall

== See also ==
- Architecture of Chicago
- List of museums and cultural institutions in Chicago
