= The Great Train Story =

Model railroad in Chicago, USA

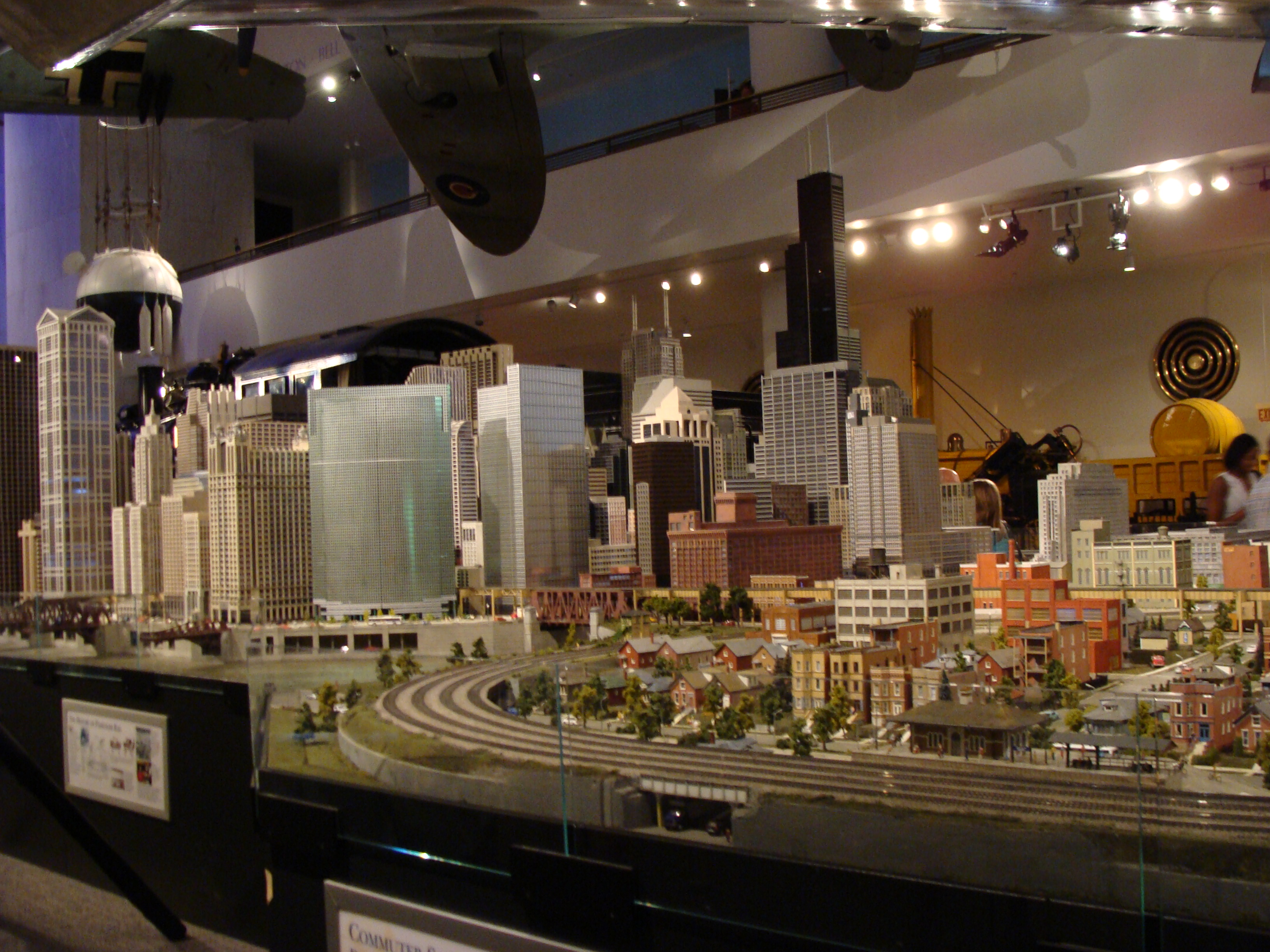
The Great Train Story

The Great Train Story is a 3,500-square-foot (330 m^{2}) HO scale model railroad display located in the Transportation Zone of Chicago's Museum of Science and Industry. It explains the story of modern-day rail transportation in a 2,206-mile (3,550 km) journey from Seattle, Washington, through several plains states en route to Chicago, Illinois. The layout features 192 custom models of buildings and landmarks including the Willis Tower, Chicago Board of Trade Building, and Union Station in Chicago; and Seattle’s Space Needle, Experience Music Project and King Street Station. The landscape between the two cities includes several natural features such as the Cascade Range, Rocky Mountains, waterfalls and forests. Man-made highlights include small towns, tunnels, truss arch and truss bridges, a lumber mill, farms, grain silos, a fruit packing house, a coal mine, and a steel mill.

In the exhibit, BNSF Railway freight trains move raw materials with centerbeam lumber cars while hopper cars carry grain and coal. Intermodal cars laden with shipping containers, and car carriers also transport finished products on freight train consists. Passenger operations include Amtrak, Metra, the Chicago Transit Authority’s 'L' and Chicago’s South Shore Line trains.

== Layouts from the past ==
The museum had an earlier model railroad layout, dating back to the early 1940s when Minton Cronkhite built the original Museum and Santa Fe Railway; a 2,340-square-foot (217 m^{2}) layout in O scale. This layout had over 1,000 feet (300 m) of track and over 20,000 hand-laid ties. The project was financed with a $58,000 grant from the Atchison, Topeka and Santa Fe Railway. Cronkhite began construction in 1939 and the exhibit made its public debut in January 1941. Much of the rolling stock and locomotives were hand built from scratch by Cronkhite using original Santa Fe plans. It featured Santa Fe’s southwestern freight and passenger operations, including a depiction of the Grand Canyon and quickly became a favorite with children and adults visiting the museum.

In 1953 Central Locomotive Works owner Bob Smith rebuilt the layout in O scale and added several diesel locomotives. It was updated again in 1988 during a year-long effort once again financed by Santa Fe. Santa Fe transferred ownership of the layout to the Museum in the early 1990s.

Wear and tear from six decades of continuous daily use gradually took its toll, and by the time of its demise the layout had only a couple of operating loops. The Museum and Santa Fe Railway was closed in May 2002. That summer, the exhibit's surviving items — several original buildings, rolling stock (both used and surplus), and pieces of scale scenery — were placed into forty lots and sold in an eBay auction. The auction generated over $21,500 for MSI.

== Current layout ==
The Great Train Story was funded with $3.5 million in donations. Contributors to the project included General American Transportation Corporation, Burlington Northern Santa Fe, Chicago Mercantile Exchange, the Elizabeth Morse Genius Charitable Trust and the Duchossois Family Foundation.

The current layout was conceived by museum exhibit designer John Llewellyn. The project took a year to build and made its public debut on November 22, 2002. Senior exhibit developer Jennifer Johnston played a key role in developing and creating the 24 information stations covering operations and public safety incorporated in the exhibit. Part of Lleyellyn and Johnston's research for the project included an 11-day trip from Seattle to Chicago. The development team studied visitor interaction with the former layout and designed the new display in a Serpentine shape in order to bring guests into the exhibit to enhance the visual experience. Guests can also avail themselves a bird's-eye view of the layout from the balcony that surrounds it.

Trains in the exhibit operate on a DC block system rather than the more modern DCC mode many railroad modelers have adopted. Several signal semaphore towers at the beginning of each block and crossing gates activate at crossings where roads intersect with rail lines to help give the viewer the impression that the system is being run in prototypical fashion.

There are seven interactive points around the layout provided for visitors to operate various functions including a Lumberjack chopping down a tree, blasting for a future mountain tunnel, and an operating drawbridge over the Chicago River. Guests can also send a Metra train on its way after a stop at a suburban station. Up to 34 trains can run simultaneously on 17 tracks including a 1,425-foot (434 m) three-track main line. The display has a number of whimsical scenes including a CowParade, Star Trek's Captain Kirk at the Space Needle, garden gnomes tending part of a forest, a man on a one-way canoe trip approaching a waterfall, and campers encountering skunks and bears. Street and building lights turn on when the exhibition hall's lights are dimmed during periodic demonstrations of the Boeing 727 suspended overhead.

== Images ==
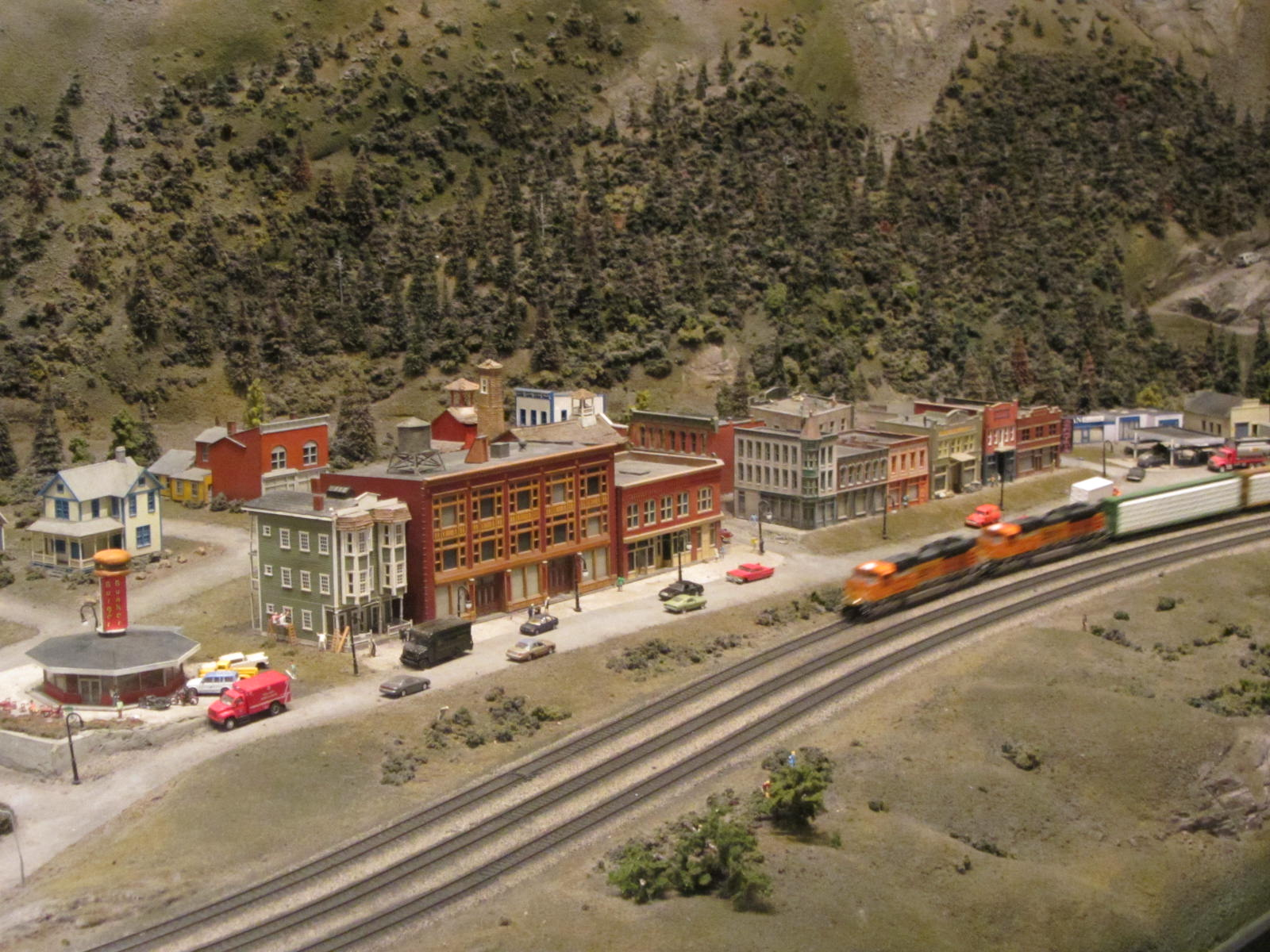

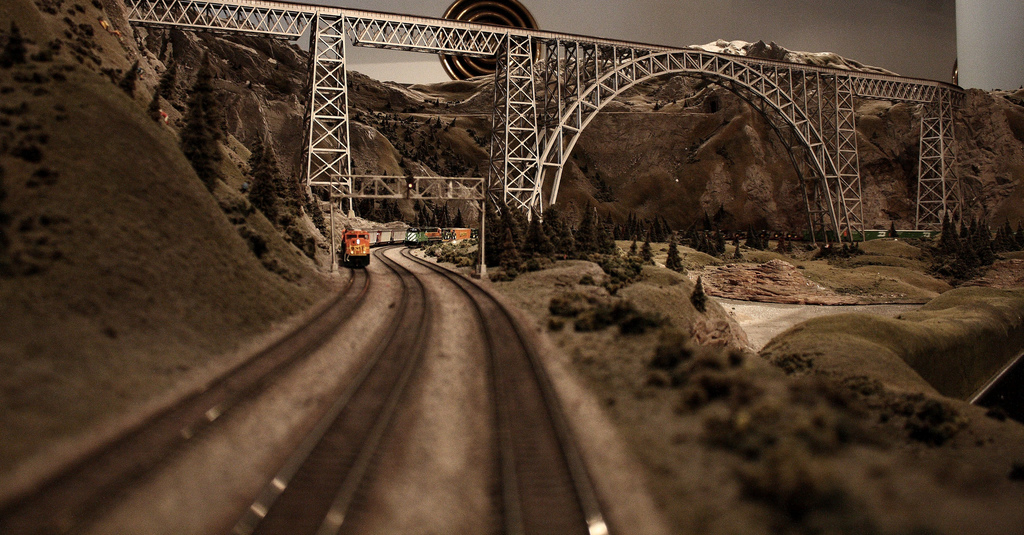

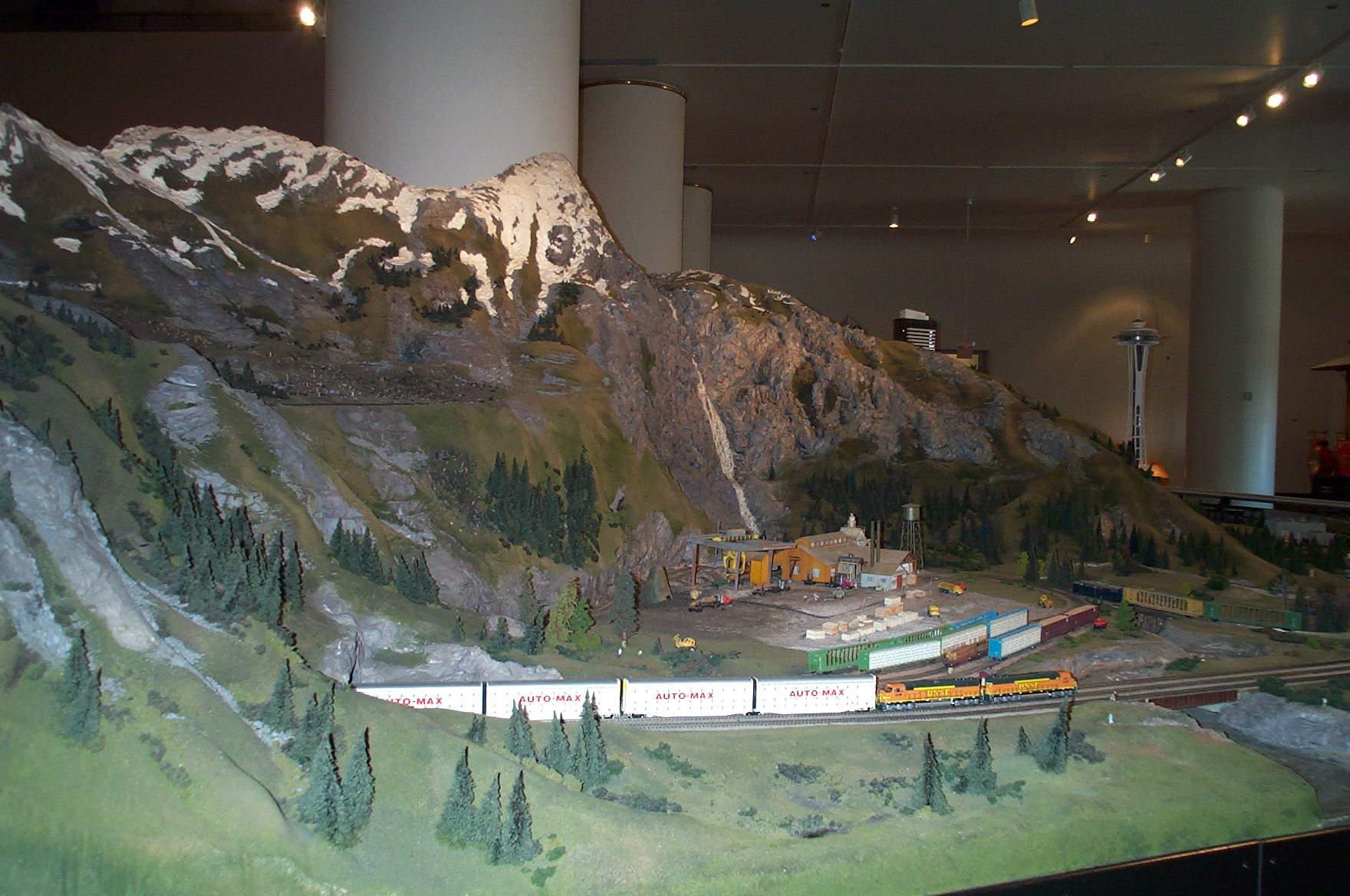

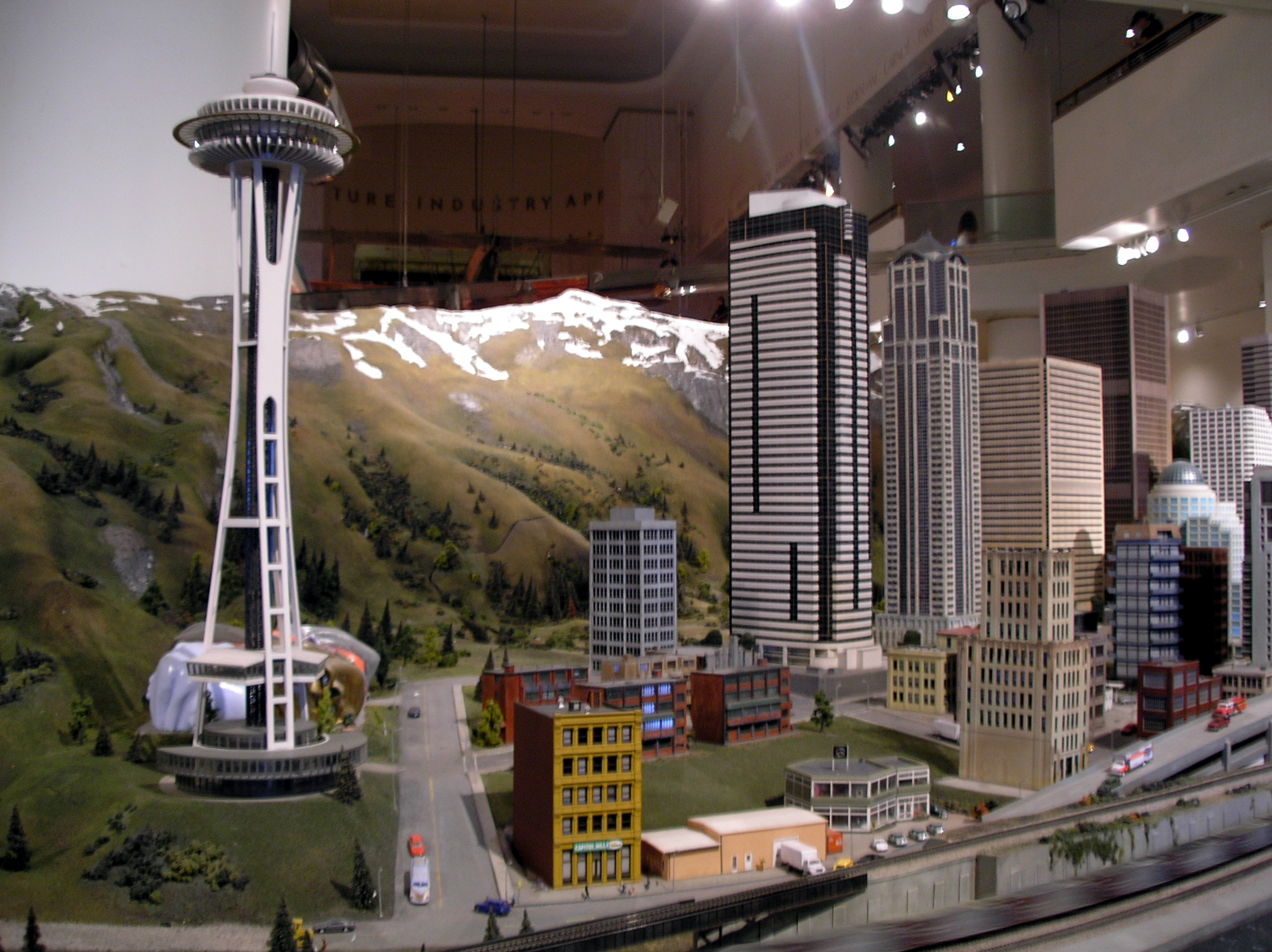

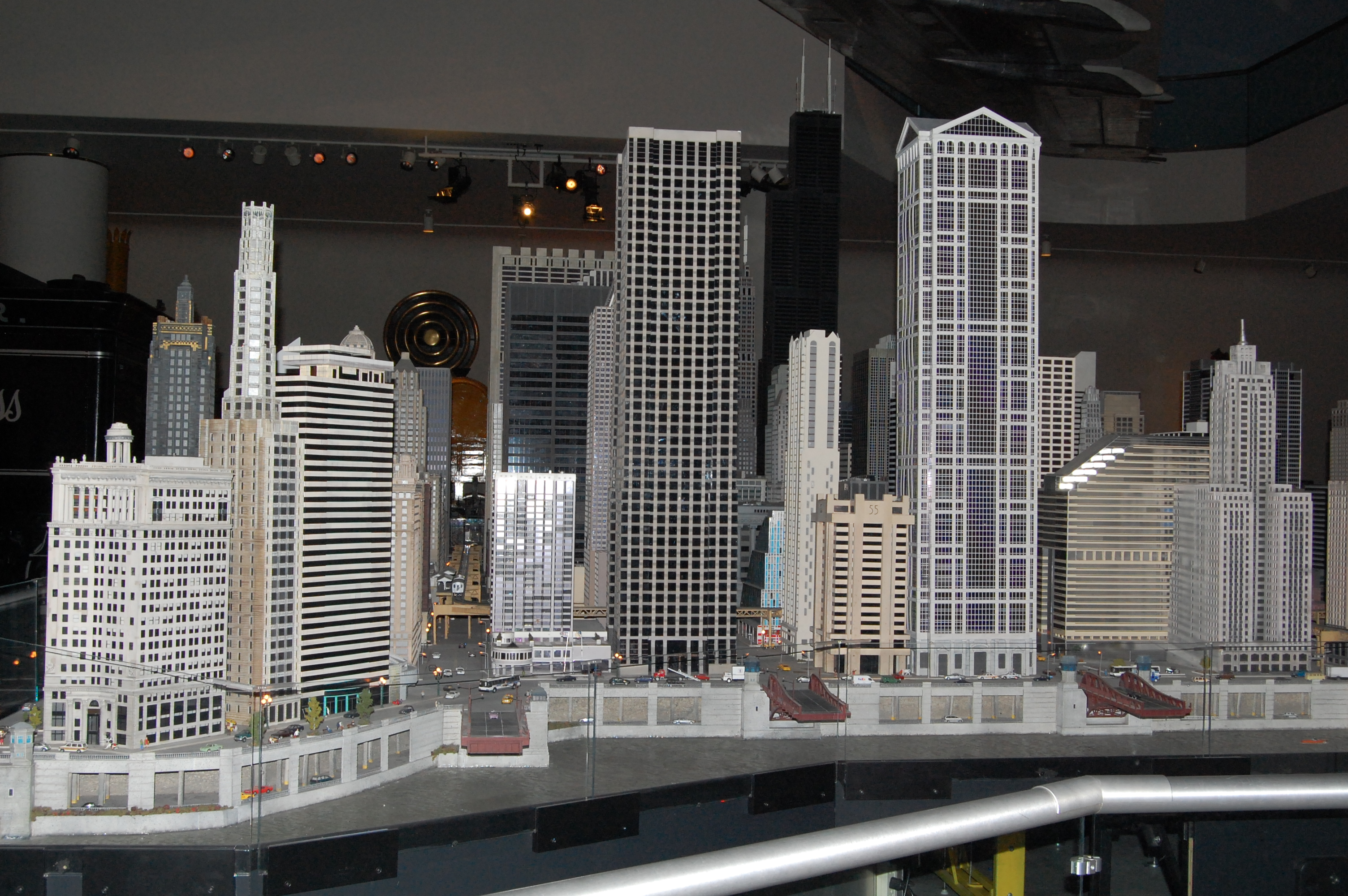

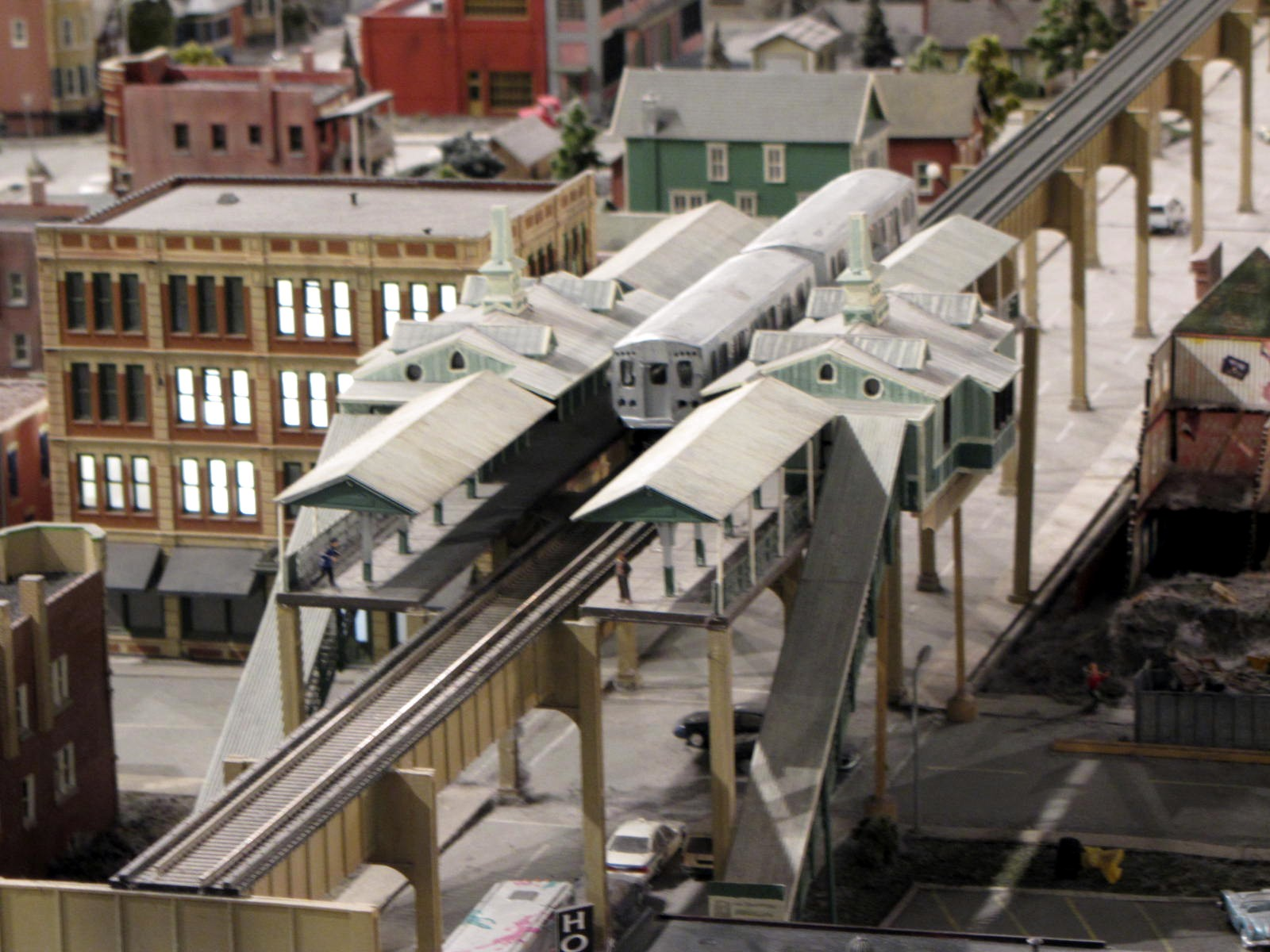
