= Henry Crown Space Center =

Artifacts and interactive

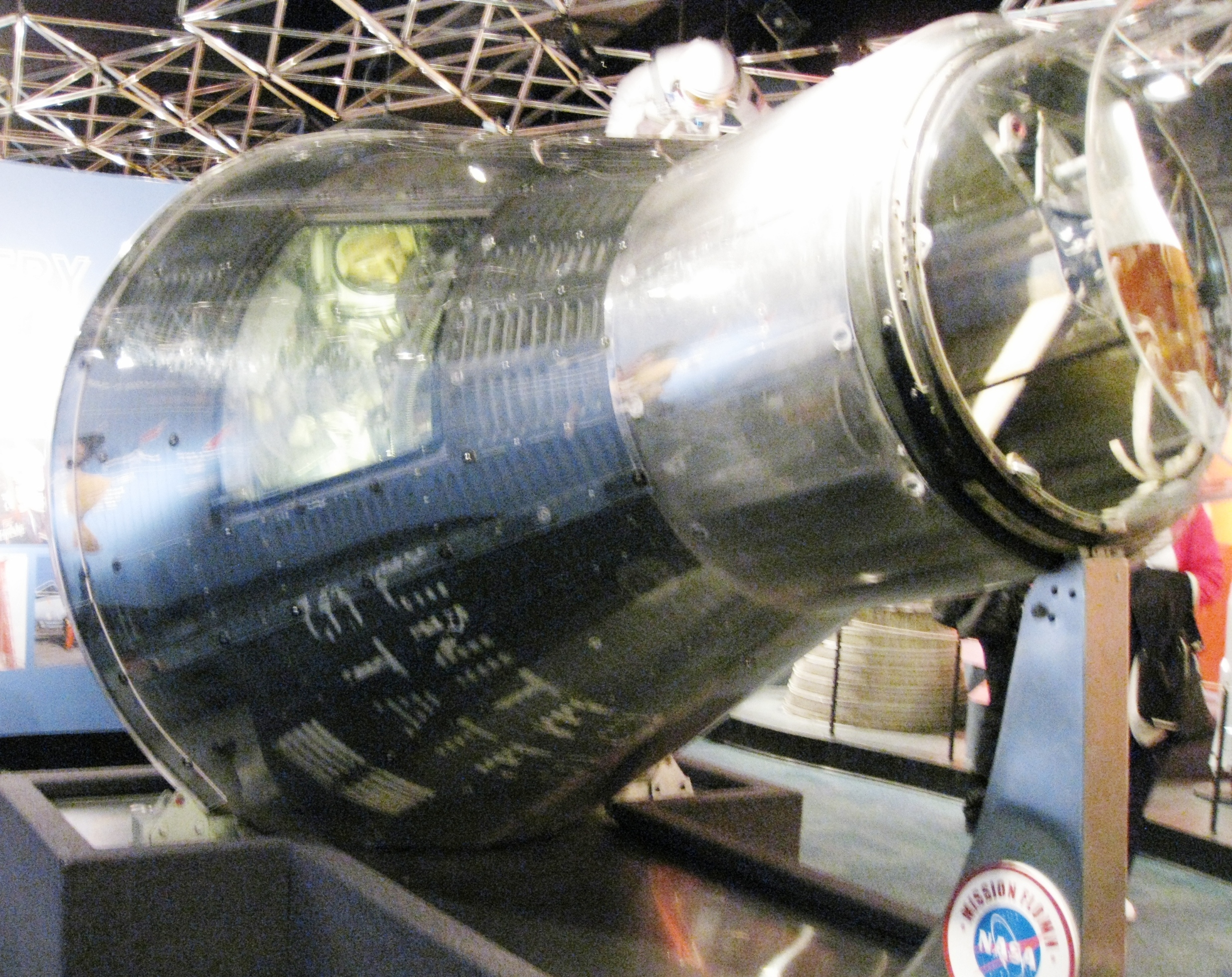
- Aurora 7 capsule
- Established: 1986; 40 years ago
- Location: 5700 South Lake Shore Drive (at East 57th Street), Chicago, Illinois, US, 60637
- Coordinates: 41°47′26″N 87°34′58″W
- Type: Space Museum
- Collection size: Spacecraft: Remote control Mars Rover; Apollo 8 spacecraft; Aurora 7 capsule
- Website: www.msichicago.org/explore/whats-here/exhibits/henry-crown-space-center/

Henry Crown Space Center opened in 1986. The space center includes artifacts and interactive exhibits about space travel. Located in the Griffin Museum of Science and Industry in Chicago, Illinois, the Henry Crown Space Center includes the Apollo 8 spacecraft and Aurora 7 capsule.

== Exhibits ==
- Interactive docking simulation with a replica of the International Space Station.
- Remote control Mars Rover
- Apollo 8 spacecraft
- Aurora 7 capsule
- Jet-packs that astronauts wear
- Lunar module used for Apollo 11 training

== History ==
The museum was established with a donation from philanthropist Henry Crown. Crown was a billionaire who built General Dynamics. General Dynamics also played a role in Aerospace.

The space center opened with a visit from James Lovell in 1986. The cost of the Space center was 12 million dollars. The museum of Science and Industry in Chicago also opened an OmniMax theater in 1986: it was built inside the space center. The space center was remodeled and reopened in May 2024.
