= Virgil Wood =

American civil rights activist (1931–2024)

The Reverend Dr. Virgil Wood
- Virgil Wood speaking at Walpole State Prison in 1971
- Born: April 6, 1931; Charlottesville, Virginia, U.S.
- Died: December 28, 2024 (aged 93); Houston, Texas, U.S.
- Education: Virginia Union University (BA); Andover Newton Theological School (MDiv); Harvard University (PhD)
- Occupations: Baptist minister; professor
- Organizations: SCLC; PNBC; OIC
- Movement: Civil rights
- Spouse: Lillian Walker
- Children: 2, David and Deborah

Virgil Alexander Wood (April 6, 1931 – December 28, 2024) was an American civil rights activist and Baptist minister. Ordained as a minister in his late teens, Wood served various churches in Rhode Island, Massachusetts, and Virginia for over 50 years. He served as pastor of the Diamond Hill Baptist Church in Lynchburg between 1958 and 1963, where he established the Lynchburg Improvement Association, a local chapter of the Southern Christian Leadership Conference. As a close associate of Martin Luther King, Wood helped organize the state of Virginia for the 1963 March on Washington. He spent the next 10 years in Boston, where he was heavily involved in civil rights activism, particularly against school segregation. He later moved to Texas after retiring from pastoral duties in 2005, and continued to promote the cause of Civil Rights.

== Early life and education ==
Virgil Alexander Wood was born in Charlottesville, Virginia on April 6, 1931. In 1948 he interviewed his grandfather Jesse, who had been born into slavery and recalled witnessing the reading of the Emancipation Proclamation by a Union soldier.

Wood was ordained as a Baptist minister in his late teens. He obtained a Bachelor of Arts degree in history from Virginia Union University in 1952, and in 1956 he graduated with a Master of Divinity degree from Andover Newton Theological School. He earned a Doctorate in Education from Harvard University in 1973, where his doctoral mentors included Chris Argyris and David McClelland.

He worked as an associate professor at Northeastern University, where he was also dean and director of the university's African American Institute (https://jdoaai.sites.northeastern.edu/). He has also been a professor at Virginia Seminary and College in Lynchburg, and a visiting lecturer, researcher and teaching fellow at Harvard University. He was a Ridenour fellow at the Virginia Tech School of Public and International Affairs. Wood also created the Martin Luther King Jr. studies PhD program at the Union Institute & University in Cincinnati.

== Civil Rights Movement ==
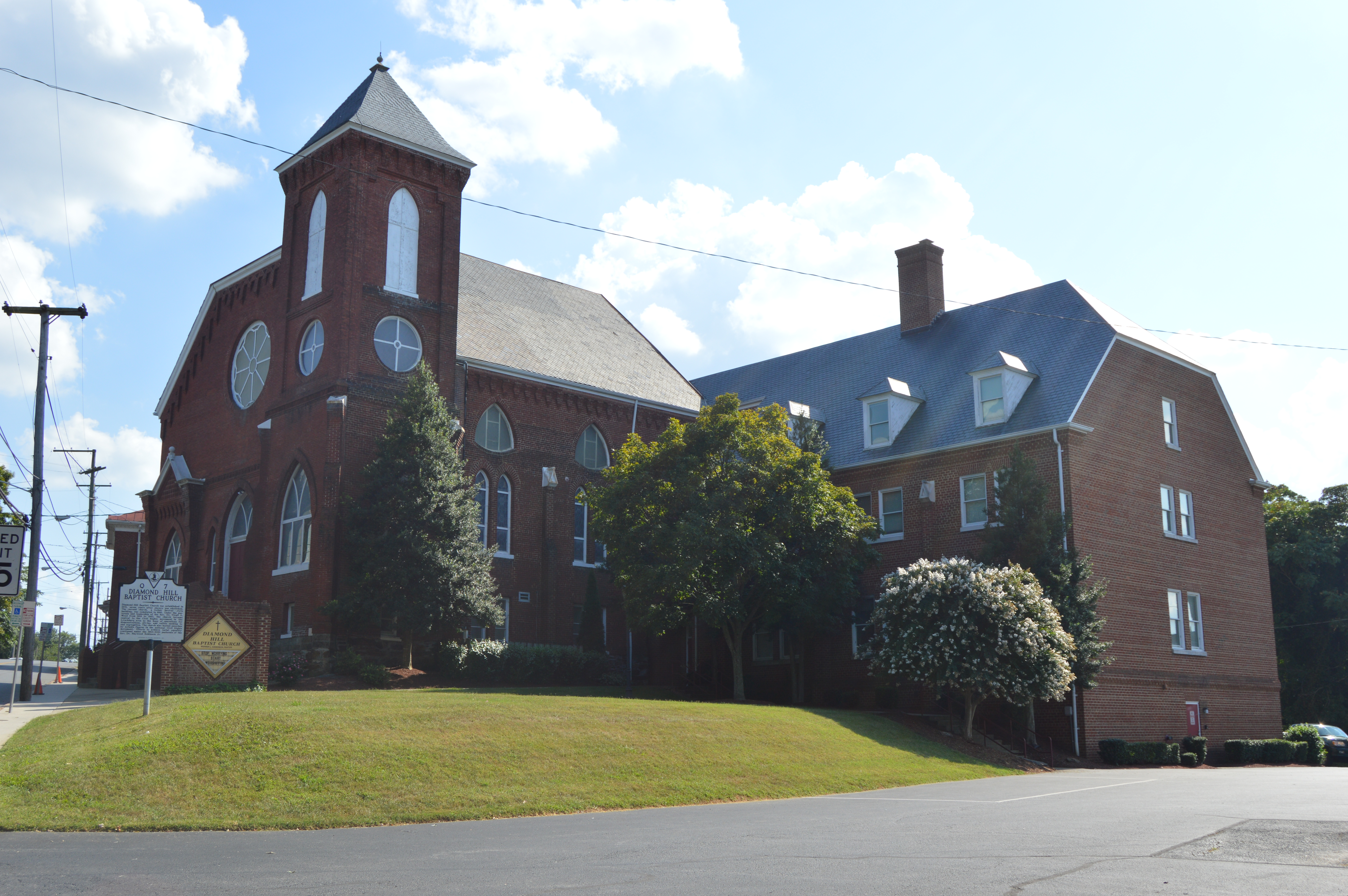
Diamond Hill Baptist Church, which Wood served as pastor of between 1958 and 1963

Wood first became involved in the civil rights movement in the late 1950s while serving as pastor of the Diamond Hill Baptist Church in Lynchburg, Virginia, where set up a local unit of the Southern Christian Leadership Conference (SCLC) known as the Lynchburg Improvement Association. Wood worked with Martin Luther King Jr. from 1959 until King's assassination in 1968, and had previously worked with his father Martin Luther King Sr. In August 1962, Virgil Wood travelled from Lynchburg, Virginia to Albany, Georgia, as part of a delegation of 103 ministers from across the United States in order to support the Albany Movement, in which Martin Luther King Jr. had already been arrested multiple times. Wood helped to mobilize his home state of Virginia for the March on Washington on August 28, 1963. In December 1963, Wood led 80 youths from North Carolina in a memorial service at the birthplace of President John F. Kennedy in Brookline, Massachusetts, the month after Kennedy had been assassinated.

At various points in his career, Wood was subjected to arrest and legal action for his activism, including serving time in jail for engaging in demonstrations. Virgil Wood and other civil rights leaders were subpoenaed by the Committee on Offenses Against the Administration of Justice in January 1962. On October 31, Wood and two other officials were threatened to be cited for contempt after they refused to answer the committee's questions on constitutional grounds. Wood said that he was interrogated and ridiculed during the committee hearing and that he expected to be cited for contempt, but that he "never expected anything less from a committee so intent upon destroying democracy". In July 1963, Wood was arrested in Danville, Virginia, while participating in a march calling for greater civil rights legislation to be passed by Congress. Wood was also subjected to multiple vigilante attacks due to his opposition to segregation. In May 1961, two days after it was announced that demonstrations against segregation would resume, the windshield and rear window of Wood's car were smashed while it was parked in front of his home in Lynchburg, causing $250 in damage. In 1963, at about 10:30pm on the night of his return from the March on Washington, a rock was thrown through the window of Wood's home in Lynchburg by unidentified assailants. Wood blamed the attack on the recent visit of American Nazi Party leader George Lincoln Rockwell to Virginia.

=== Virginia campaigns ===
In 1960, Wood headed a special committee of the NAACP which recommended that stores in Lynchburg which refused to give lunch counter service to black customers should be subjected to picketing and boycotts. On March 10, 1960, the special committee sent a request to the F. W. Woolworth store in Lynchburg, calling for full lunch counter service to all patrons regardless of race. Picketing continued into June 1961, when the Lynchburg Ministerial Association and the NAACP endorsed the Lynchburg Interracial Commission, which was set up by the mayor after sit-down demonstrations brought trade to a standstill. The Ministerial Association's resolution was brought forward by Wood, whose Lynchburg Improvement Association was picketing against job discrimination in downtown stores. In August 1962, Wood also promised that the SCLC would boycott and picket the home games of the White Sox baseball team as part of a protest against segregation. He called for volunteers to continue picketing the team until they received assurances from a city-appointed committee on baseball. Wood also criticised the committee named by the mayor of Lynchburg, William C. Vaughan, because it did not contain a single black member despite there being black players on the baseball team. Wood said that it was "inconceivable that a team could leave two cities because of trouble about segregation and not confront the same problem here".

While on a preaching visit to the Friendship Baptist Church in Toledo, Ohio, in April 1963, Wood said that voting and selective use of buying power were the priority methods for integration in the southern states. He encouraged African-Americans to register to vote, saying that "All over the South we are discovering that the ballot is the most powerful factor in integration". He also said that selective buying was an effective method for African-Americans to use by spending their money at businesses which hired black employees and treated them equally. In the same interview, Wood emphasised this religious commitment to desegregation as a member of the SCLC, saying that "We believe the Judeo-Christian philosophy and American democracy are at stake in the continuation of segregation." He added that "We feel the failure of America to act in its own best tradition has given rise to another problem: black supremacy, as personified by the Black Muslim movement. Black supremacy is as much to be abhorred as white supremacy." In July 1963, the Lynchburg Improvement Association began a campaign for the racial integration of the Jones Memorial Library and the Young Women's Christian Association. Wood said that "if they don't admit us, we will worry the hell out of them with demonstrations". Wood acknowledged that since the library was endowed by a private fund, it had "no legal obligation to admit Negroes if they don't want to", but that "they do have a moral obligation".

Wood and other civil rights leaders also fought against laws requiring segregation in Virginia by taking legal action. In March 1961, Lynchburg City Council set aside a request to declare itself opposed to segregation and instead referred the issue of racial integration to the Lynchburg interracial committee, after approving a motion introduced by councilman Claude A. Hoskins that the committee hold public hearings before giving its recommendations. Wood argued that the matter did not belong with the committee, and that the council ought to make a "public witness" that would "sound the death knell of tension about racial segregation". The Lynchburg Improvement Association called for an immediate end to segregation and threatened to seek relief in federal court. In July 1961, 12-year-old Brian Robinson drowned in an abandoned canal in Lynchburg after the city had closed public pools in order to prevent their use by black residents. Of the three municipal pools in Lynchburg, two were whites-only. The Lynchburg Improvement Association had called for them to be open to everyone, but all three were closed by city manager Robert Morrison after an attempted swim in Miller Park pool on July 4. Wood decried Robinson's "needless" death as a result of the city's failure to comply with court rulings which mandated the racial integration of public pools. Robinson and his parents were also members of the Diamond Hill Baptist Church, of which Wood was the pastor. The boy's mother, Grace Robinson, similarly blamed the city official who gave the order to close the city's pools for her son's death. In July 1962, Judge Thomas J. Michie of Charlottesville, Virginia, announced that he would declare Lynchburg's law requiring segregation of public assemblies as unconstitutional, but warned the plaintiff, Virgil Wood, that officials in Lynchburg would close its armory before they would desegregate it.

At the end of August 1961, Virgil Wood claimed that he had been fired from his role as an instructor at Virginia Seminary and College because of his involvement in civil rights activism. Wood's claim was echoed by Rev. Richard R. Hicks, who said that he was also terminated from his role as an art instructor at around the same time. In October, the executive board of trustees of Virginia Seminary and College passed a vote of confidence in its president, M. C. Allen, after allegations by Wood that Allen had a policy of "firing instructors and expelling students" because the college was opposed to the civil rights of African-Americans. The executive committee's report claimed that there was no evidence Virgil Wood had been fired, but rather that his contract had expired and Wood had not discussed a new contract for the next term until 3 months later, meaning he did not receive a contract for the next year. M. C. Allen denied the allegations, which he said were "an attempt to embarrass me and the school" and that "those men are definitely lying."

In October 1962, a 37-year-old white man, George Walton Brooks, was convicted by an all-white jury for the rape of an 11-year-old African-American girl. Despite being caught in the act by two white police officers, he pleaded innocent and blamed the testimony given by police on "the Rev. Virgil Wood and the NAACP", and ultimately received only the minimum 5-year prison sentence. The next year, Wood was present at the passing of the second death sentence on an 18-year-old African-American, Thomas C. Wansley, who was convicted for the rape of a white woman and a Japanese woman in 1962. Wood and other civil rights leaders expressed concern for the sentence passed on Wansley, accusing the justice system of double standards by comparing Wansley's death penalty to the 5-year prison term given to George Walton Brooks the previous year. Wood had earlier been held in contempt by Judge O. Raymond Cundiff for distributing a pamphlet attacking the first death sentence. Wansley's attorney Reuben Lawson later spoke at a prayer meeting held at Diamond Hill Baptist Church to raise funds to appeal the convictions. Wansley's convictions were overturned by the Virginia Supreme Court in 1964, and he was sentenced to life imprisonment at a second trial in 1967. His 1967 convictions were overturned in 1973 on the grounds that prejudicial publicity in local newspapers, which Judge Robert R. Merhige Jr. described as "shockingly" prejudiced and "highly inflammatory", had deprived him of a fair trial.

=== Boston decade ===
Virgil Wood moved to Boston in 1963, shortly after the March on Washington. He referred to the 10-year period between 1963 and 1973 as his "Boston decade", which formed the foundation of his later work in civil rights, education and church leadership. He later served on the national executive board of the Southern Christian Leadership Conference, and was in charge of the SCLC's Massachusetts branch during his decade in Boston. Wood also served as pastoral director of the Blue Hill Christian Center in Roxbury, Boston between 1963 and 1970. In March 1965, Virgil Wood attended a civil rights rally on Boston Common during which a minute of silence was held in memory of Reverend James Reeb, who had died after being beaten in the street by white supremacists in Birmingham, Alabama. The beginning of the meeting had been disturbed by the presence of Jozef Mlot-Mroz, an anti-Communist activist known for his opposition to the civil rights movement, who took up a prominent position on the steps leading up to the speaker's platform while holding a large cross inscribed with the words "Smash Communism". Virgil Wood and others objected to his presence, with some comparing it to a symbol of the Ku Klux Klan, although he remained for the duration of the rally.

During his time in Boston, Wood campaigned against educational inequality in Boston's schools, many of which remained de facto segregated. As president of the Massachusetts branch of the SCLC, Wood endorsed a school "stay-out" day in 1964, in defiance of a ruling by Massachusetts attorney general Edward W. Brooke that the planned protest was illegal. After the ruling, the Civil Liberties Union of Massachusetts reaffirmed its position that there was no valid legal or constitutional objection to a peaceful school stay-out. The school boycott was also endorsed by the Civil Rights Committee of students and faculty at the Boston University School of Social Work. In April 1965, Wood marched alongside Martin Luther King from Roxbury to the Boston Common in a demonstration against school segregation. The protest was organized by Wood and other Boston activist leaders who had invited King to the city to lead the march, marking the first time King led a march outside the south. Boston Mayor John F. Collins objected to the planned demonstration in front of City Hall, but Wood noted that officials in Selma had also objected to demonstrations which went ahead anyway. Wood responded to Collins by saying that "Boston is no different from Selma" and that "if we choose to do it, we will do it.". Wood, now acting as head of the Boston branch of the SCLC, was informed by the school committee that they would only meet with Dr. King, which Wood described as "nonsense" because "Dr. King wouldn't presume to speak for the local people.". Dr. King consequently did not meet with the school committee. Wood hailed the march as a "magnificent success". The day after the march, the majority-black Everett School was damaged by a fire which school committee chair Louise Day Hicks described as "a very strange coincidence", adding that the nearby Sherwin School had suffered fire damage just 10 days after a protest rally in 1963. Wood responded to Hicks by describing her comments as "political opportunism".

In September 1965, Wood drove a school bus of black students to the mostly white Parkman School in Jamaica Plain as part of a protest against racial inequality and overcrowding in Boston schools. The protest, named "Operation Exodus", was organized after the school committee had refused to authorise busing from one school to another. The black students, guided by their teachers and civil rights leaders, entered the school and sat down at the empty desks, despite attempts to block their entry by Parkman school principal George O'Connell. The black students wore pins with messages that included "I have no desk or books", "May I join you in your classes?", and "I wish to learn also". Principal O'Connell told Wood that the students required transfer slips to enroll, to which Wood responded that he should "take that up with the school department". The children were permitted to stay at the school for the day. Similar protests occurred at several other schools, with approximately 5 busloads of 40 to 50 children each arriving at white-majority schools. In August 1966, Wood spoke to over a thousand African-Americans at a rally against school segregation in Providence, Rhode Island, in one of the city's largest civil rights rallies. He told the crowd to "get off your behinds" in order to force the Providence School Committee to end de facto segregation in public schools, and also said that "black power is one of the most beautiful phrases I've heard in a long time".

News report on the 1967 riots in Roxbury

In response to the race riots in the summer of 1967 in the Grove Hall area of Boston, which Boston mayor John F. Collins described as "the worst manifestation of disrespect for the rights of others that Boston has ever seen", Wood said that "war was declared on the black people by the police force" and that he "must lay the blame entirely" on the police. Wood continued that violence was likely to occur again "unless the whole attitude of the administration changes". Significant damage was caused by the riots along Blue Hill Avenue in the Grove Hall area of Roxbury. Reverend Vernon E. Carter urged the city's residents to join him in a "peace vigil" to "make our communities a safe haven of healthy citizenship". In December 1967, Virgil Wood testified before the U.S. Commission on Civil Rights, telling commissioners that some people in Roxbury had discovered they could get a faster police response to their calls for help if they told dispatchers that they were witnessing a black person beating up a white person.

In April 1968, Boston mayor Kevin H. White said that the demands of the "United Front" coalition led by Wood were unreasonable and threatened to wreck progress made on racial integration in the city. Wood, as the United Front's spokesman, listed 21 demands including that "the white community at large immediately make $100 million available to the black community", and that "all white-owned and white-controlled businesses be closed until further notice while the transfer of the ownership of these businesses to the black community is being negotiated through the United Front". White responded to these demands by saying that "I will not by one word or one act add to the delusion that it is rational, workable or dignified either for black or white", adding that "social reform rarely benefits from expropriation". A separate list of demands put forward by the NAACP was received more favourably by White, who described it as "a worthy basis for serious implementation".

In February 1969, Wood addressed student protesters outside Ford Hall at Brandeis University who were demanding that they be empowered to name the head of the new African and Afro-American Studies Department. Also in 1969, Wood addressed over 10,000 Christian Scientists at the Church's first annual meeting to permit non-members to attend, during which Wood and other members of a delegation representing the Metropolitan Boston Committee of Black Churchmen read demands for $100 million in reparations from the city's churches. The delegation was initially denied entrance by security guards, until they threatened to force their way into the meeting. Chairman Inman H. Douglass spoke with members of the delegation and brought them before the meeting, where Wood told the audience: "We command the Christian Science Church to acknowledge and repent its participation in the collective racism of this society".

==== Patrick T. Campbell School incident ====
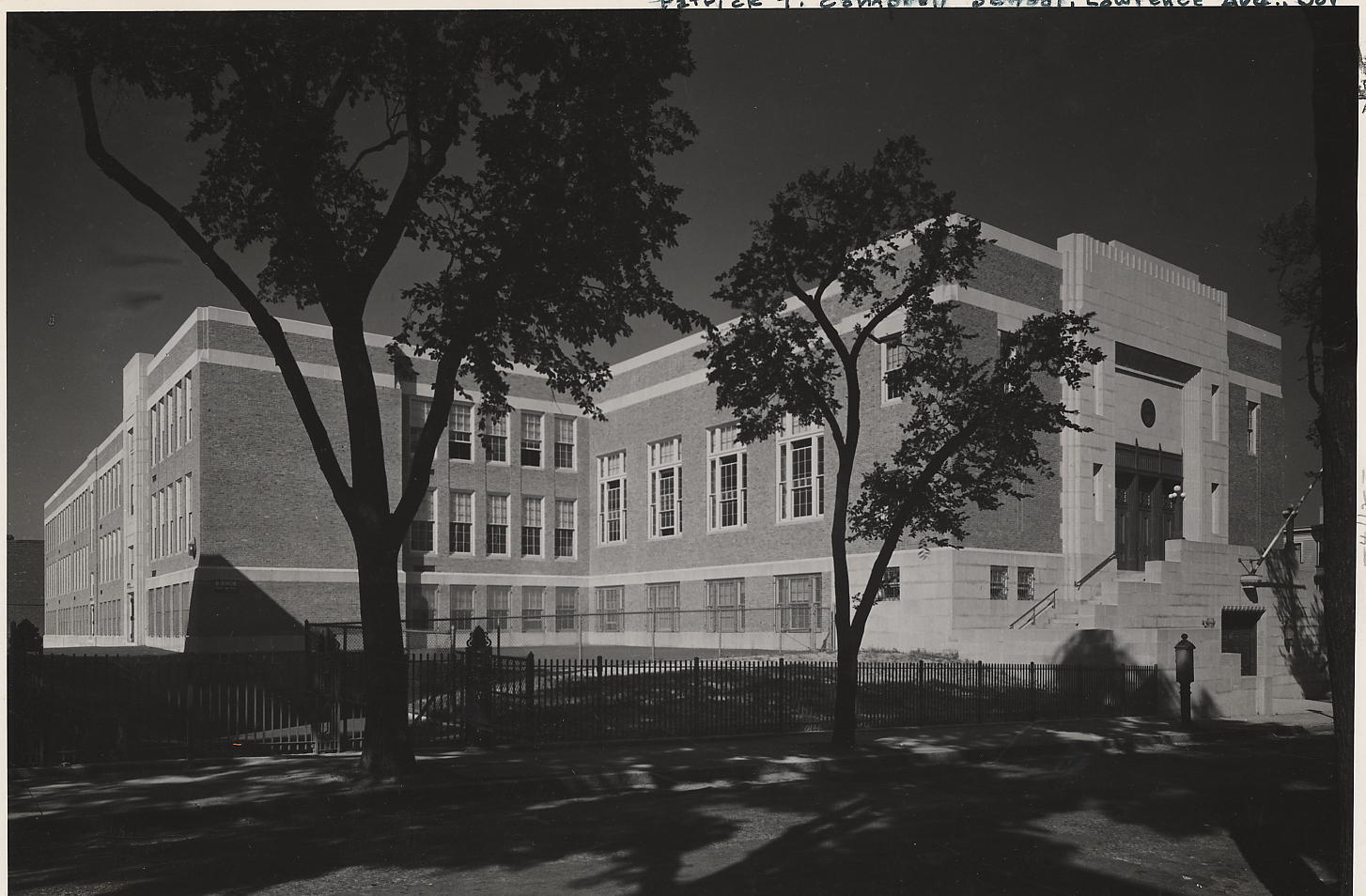
Patrick T. Campbell School, later renamed after Martin Luther King Jr.

On June 16, 1966, Wood was forcibly removed from the stage at a graduation ceremony in Patrick T. Campbell Junior High School after interrupting the ceremony to denounce the attendance of school committeewoman Louise Day Hicks, who was known for her opposition to school desegregation. Wood described Hicks as "the Hitler of Boston" and asked school principal Francis E. Harrington "would any Synagogue invite Hitler?". Wood was arrested by plain clothed police officers, but he was ultimately cleared of charges of disrupting the peace by Judge Jerome P. Troy. Wood testified in court that he took the stage in order to calm audience members who were disturbed by the presence of committeewoman Hicks, and six defense witnesses corroborated Wood's claim that it was the presence of Hicks which caused the disturbance. Immediately after the incident, Hicks requested round-the-clock police protection from Wood, whom she called "a dangerous man and a threat to my safety as long as he's walking the streets free", further accusing Wood of endangering "women and small children" at the graduation. Boston police commissioner Edmund McNamara denied her request, stating that "Mrs. Hicks will be provided with the same protection given all citizens of Boston - no more, no less". Civil rights leaders hoped to hold a second "freedom graduation" in the school auditorium, as Wood argued that the students had been deprived of a proper graduation, but the school committee refused to approve of a second graduation ceremony. Nonetheless, Operation Exodus leader Ellen Jackson immediately announced that outdoor ceremonies would be held in the schoolyard. Originally named after Patrick T. Campbell, the school was renamed in honor of Martin Luther King Jr. on April 11, 1968, a week after his assassination on April 4.

== Later activism ==
Wood was a member of three White House conferences under presidents Johnson, Nixon and Carter. He also served as a member of the Economic Development Taskforce of the National Conference of Black Mayors, as first chairman of the Economic Development Commission of the Progressive National Baptist Convention, and as consultant to the National Negro Business League. During his time in Lynchburg, Virginia, Wood organized that city's chapter of the Opportunities Industrialization Center which provides education and job training to disadvantaged adults, and as an administrator he helped to establish 13 OIC centres in 8 states across the south as well as in Boston. After moving to the Houston area, Wood advocated for the establishment of a black think tank, based on a similar concept in San Francisco established by Julia and Nathan Hare in 1979.

Wood had collaborated with others on multiple projects, which at one point included the website "SoulScope" in partnership with LifeWorx Associates, an organization described as "specialists in measuring and teaching the Enneagram types". In 2011 Wood collaborated with Fred Stawitz to organize the "Free the Dream" movement, and in 2017 Wood became a leader of the Beloved Community Initiative. Alongside the "Beloved Community", Wood advocated for a "Beloved Economy" to tackle the challenges of poverty, education and crime. He also added to Martin Luther King's statement that "The arc of the moral universe is long, but it bends towards justice" by pointing out that "Everywhere it bends, there stands a black person and a white person", giving the example of Frederick Douglass and Abraham Lincoln to illustrate the importance that members of both races work together to achieve change.

Wood was a leading figure in the drive to change the official name of the state of Rhode Island to remove references to plantations, due to the association of the term with slavery. Previously, the official name of the state was the "State of Rhode Island and Providence Plantations". Wood argued that the name ought to be changed because "It is a requirement of a civil society that it does not insult some of its citizens knowingly" and that "there is no longer any room for not knowing". The state would eventually change its name to simply the "State of Rhode Island" in November 2020, after voters approved an amendment to the state constitution.

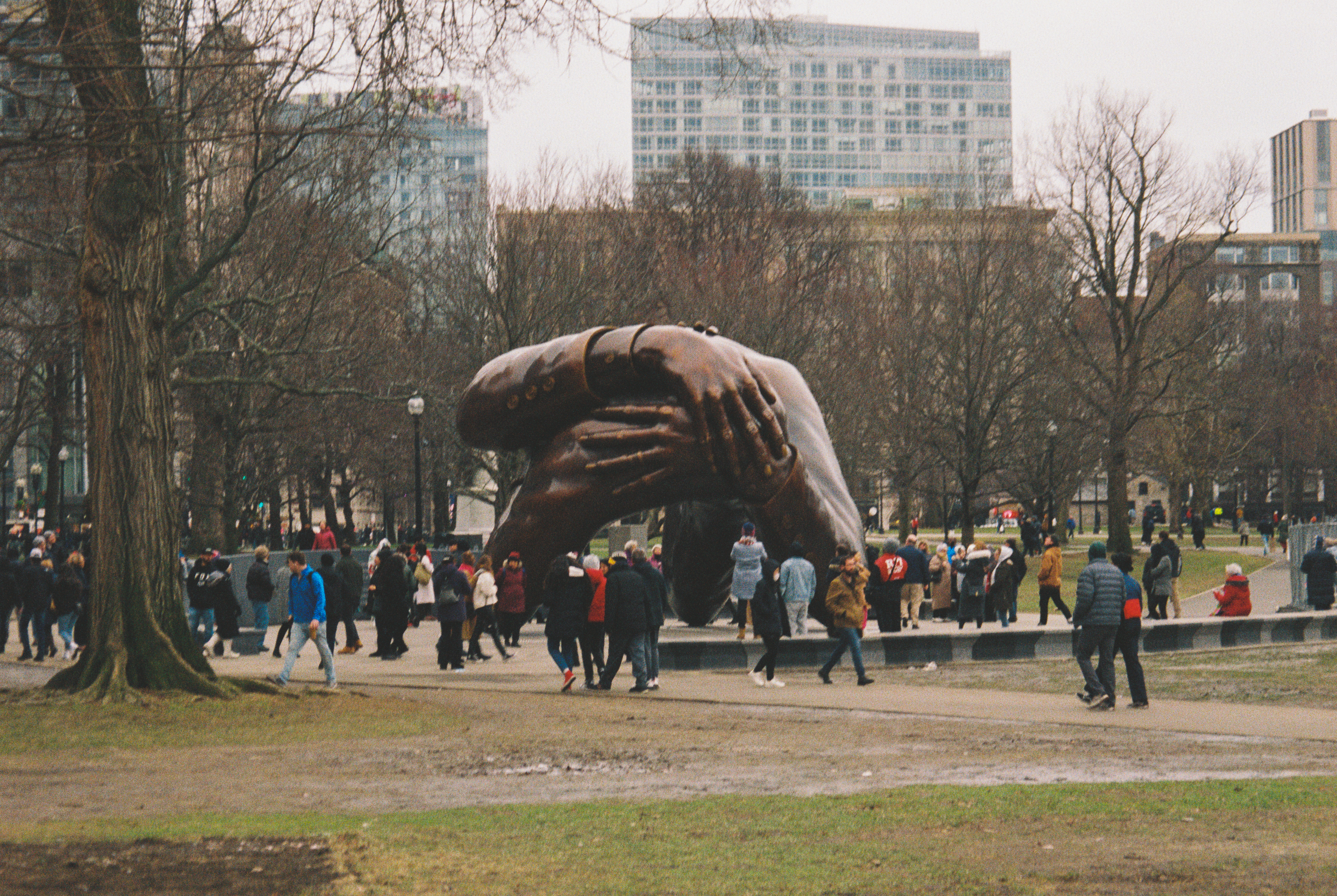
The Embrace sculpture in Boston. Wood is one of 69 civil rights activists memorialized in the surrounding plaza.

Wood has written multiple books about his experiences during the civil rights movement and his work with Martin Luther King Jr., and in 2005 Wood published In Love We Trust: Lessons I Learned From Martin Luther King. He later published a second book, In Love We Still Trust: Lessons we learned from Martin Luther King Jr. and Sr. in 2020, which illustrates the nonviolent principles of the "Beloved Community" ethos adapted by King. Wood has also criticized the vast sums of money spent on physical memorials to Martin Luther King, including the Martin Luther King Jr. Memorial in Washington D.C. and The Embrace sculpture in Boston, which he argued would be better spent on making King's wishes a reality by promoting racial justice and addressing the root causes of poverty. Wood himself is memorialized as one of the "heroes" of Boston on the 1965 Freedom Plaza which surrounds The Embrace sculpture on Boston Common.

In 2012 Wood expressed support for the Occupy Movement, asserting that "the origin of the Occupy Movement is a Civil Rights Movement". During the racial unrest of 2020–2023 Wood expressed sympathy for the Black Lives Matter movement, but was critical of its lack of organization. In 2021 he said that the Black Lives Matter movement was "falling apart, as you know right now, because they didn’t understand one thing, you don’t jump out and march first. You plan your strategy and you also give the people who have the power to do what you need, give them the opportunity to respond positively first. And if they don’t respond, then when you hit that thing, man, you know what part of it you’re hitting." In the aftermath of the George Floyd protests he also expressed anger at the failure of churches to deal with poverty among black Americans, saying that "We must have 40 to 50 megachurches in Houston, and all we can do for George Floyd is to hold a charade on his grave."

In an interview in 2021, Wood said that current inequality in education began when schools "desegregated wrongly" and that "We should never have desegregated education below high school." Wood argued that the desegregation of schools had not resulted in greater equality, but rather put black children "in the hands of people who not only didn’t know them, but don’t care about them". He further added that "we have given away the franchise on the education of our people. We had it, up to the Plessy v. Ferguson. We had great education going on until we allowed them to fire those black women teachers". He also expressed support for Vice President Kamala Harris, saying "I love Kamala, I think she’s one of the best things that’s happened for us" and that "She may well become our first black president. It wasn’t Bill Clinton and it wasn’t Barack Obama. For the most part, all we’ve had is presidents who have been Ronald Reagan in one guise or another".

== Personal life and death ==
Virgil Wood married Lillian Walker, with whom he had two children. The couple relocated to Pearland, Texas, after Virgil retired from his pastoral role at Pond Street Baptist Church in Providence, Rhode Island, which he first served from 1955 to 1958, and again from 1983 until his retirement in 2005. Virgil and Lillian Wood were also lifelong friends of Rosa Parks, whom Virgil had met while serving on the Boston board of the SCLC, and the couple were present when Parks received the Presidential Medal of Freedom.

Virgil Wood died in Houston, Texas, on December 28, 2024, at the age of 93. He is survived by his wife Lillian Walker Wood, two children; David A. Wood of Diamond Bar, CA., and Deborah Y. Wood of Pearland, TX, two grandsons; Christopher and Jordan, and two great-grandchildren; Makayla and Isaiah.

== Notable works ==
- Introduction to Black Church Economic Studies (1974)
- The Jubilee Bible (originator and contributing editor, 1999 and 2012)
- In Love We Trust: Lessons I Learned From Martin Luther King (2005)
- In Love We Still Trust: Lessons We Learned From Martin Luther King Jr. and Sr. (2020)
