= James D. St. Clair =

American lawyer (1920–2001)

James Draper St. Clair (April 14, 1920 – March 10, 2001) was an American lawyer, who practiced law for many years in Boston with the firm of Hale & Dorr. He was the chief legal counsel for President Richard Nixon during the Watergate scandal.

== Early life ==
James St. Clair was born on April 14, 1920, in Akron, Ohio. He was raised in a number of Midwest cities, including Erie, Pennsylvania, Buffalo, New York, and Albany, New York. He received a bachelor's degree from the University of Illinois in 1941. From 1942 to 1945 was an officer in the United States Navy. He graduated from Harvard Law School in 1947 and joined the firm of Hale & Dorr two years later. He became a senior partner in 1954.

== Legal career ==
=== Army–McCarthy hearings ===
St. Clair first gained notice while assisting Joseph Welch in the Army–McCarthy hearings of 1954. St. Clair selected Fred Fisher to assist with the case. Fisher was sent home before the hearings began after Welch confirmed his prior membership in the National Lawyers Guild, an organization accused of Communist sympathies. Joseph McCarthy attacked Fisher's membership in the group, which led to Welch's famous line "Have you no sense of decency, sir? At long last, have you left no sense of decency?"

In 1955, St. Clair assisted with the defense of Wendell H. Furry, a Harvard physics professor who was charged with Contempt of Congress for refusing to testify before McCarthy and the Senate Permanent Subcommittee on Investigations.

=== 1960s and 70s ===
In 1961, he was hired by Massachusetts Governor John A. Volpe to prepare removal proceedings against Boston police commissioner Leo J. Sullivan. The following year he handled the removal proceedings against state waterways director Rodolphe G. Bessette following Bessette's indictment for perjury and conspiracy. In 1967 he defended Frederick Wiseman when the Massachusetts government attempted to censor Titicut Follies, Wiseman's documentary about the conditions of Bridgewater State Hospital. In 1968 he defended William Sloane Coffin, a Yale chaplain who was found guilty of treason for advising students to avoid the draft (Coffin's counsel during the appeals process, Arthur Goldberg, got the conviction overturned). In 1972, the Massachusetts Supreme Judicial Court appointed St. Clair and Raymond Young to investigate the complaints against Judge Jerome P. Troy. During the early 1970s, St. Clair served as the chief counsel for the Boston School Committee in a lawsuit that led to court ordered bussing. He left the case to become counsel for President Nixon and Hale & Dorr resigned from the case that following year when the school committee refused to approve a citywide busing plan.

=== Counsel for Richard Nixon ===
In December 1973, St. Clair was appointed as a special counsel to Richard Nixon. He had previously been offered the position of chief litigator for special prosecutor Archibald Cox, however he chose to work for Nixon instead, as he wanted to be in charge rather than report to another attorney. He assisted Republican counsel to the House Judiciary Committee Albert E. Jenner Jr. and defended Nixon before the United States Supreme Court in United States v. Nixon. The court ruled unanimously against Nixon. Nixon resigned on August 9, 1974, and St. Clair's assignment as his legal counsel ended on August 14 after completing Judge John Sirica's request to make a final search for a missing White House tape.

=== Later career ===
In 1976, St. Clair was assigned by the Roxbury District Court to defend Randolph Lewis, an African-American charged with severely beating a white man, who later died. During the trial, St. Clair was assigned bodyguards due to threats made against him. Lewis was found guilty, but St. Clair was able to get the conviction overturned on appeal. The indictments against Lewis were dropped in 1983.

St. Clair served as legal counsel for the states of Maine, South Carolina, and the town of Mashpee, Massachusetts, who were being sued by Native Americans claiming lands once occupied by their tribes. In 1982 he represented Boston Marathon sponsorship agent Marshall Medoff in his dispute with the Boston Athletic Association. In 1983, St. Clair led Buddy LeRoux's legal battle to take over ownership of the Boston Red Sox. In 1987 he defended Westfield State College president Francis J. Pilecki, who was accused of sexually molesting two students. Pilecki was found not guilty in one of the cases and the charges were dropped in the other after a civil settlement was reached.

In 1992, Boston Mayor Raymond Flynn appointed St. Clair to lead a commission investigating the Police Department. The commission made 36 recommendations, including that Flynn not reappoint his lifelong friend, Francis Roache, as police commissioner. The police department elected to adopt 31 of the 36 recommendations, however the mayor elected to retain Roache.

== Personal life and death ==
St. Clair resided in Wellesley, Massachusetts. He died on March 10, 2001, at a nursing home in Westwood, Massachusetts. He was survived by his wife of 56 years and three children, one of whom, Margaret, served as Secretary of Energy under Governor Edward J. King.
