= Gunnar Peterson =

American personal trainer

- Born: Houston, Texas, U.S.
- Occupations: Businessman, personal trainer, author, actor
- Spouse(s): Janet Crown (divorced), Jessica Friedman
- Children: 5
- Family: Lester Crown (former father-in-law), Jill and Charlie McMillan

Gunnar Peterson is an American personal trainer, author, businessman, and actor best known for his work with professional athletes and celebrities. He is also a speaker, creator of major fitness programs, and developer of fitness equipment with a focus on functional training. His known best students are Dwayne "The Rock" Johnson, Billy Dee Williams.

== Early life and education ==
As a child in Houston, Texas, Peterson struggled with his weight. At age 10, his mother enrolled him in Weight Watchers and began driving him to weekly meetings. As he tells People Magazine, "At one meeting they announced I'd lost 5lbs., I celebrated by buying two ice-cream sandwiches." By college, Gunnar had gotten serious about fitness and started his career; People notes the extra weight is "now but a memory on his 9.5 percent body fat frame."

He is a graduate of Duke University (class of 1985) in Durham, North Carolina with degrees in Physical Fitness, Psychology and Nutrition. He is also a Certified Strength and Conditioning Specialist (CSCS), a National Strength and Conditioning Association (NSCA) Certified Personal Trainer (CPT), and is certified by the American Council on Exercise.

== Career ==
=== Fitness expert and personal trainer ===
Peterson owns and operates a private training facility in Beverly Hills, California where he works out up to 9 clients per day. He told Sports Illustrated, "My main focus is function" - a reference to his emphasis on functional training modalities. He is widely recognized for his expertise in functional training and his commitment to developing and implementing innovative fitness techniques. In 2022, Peterson became the Chief of Athletics for the functional fitness franchise F45, where he partnered with David Beckham to create the DB45 workout.

As a personal trainer, Peterson does one-on-one sessions with workouts. This practice is tied to his emphasis on functional training. He has worked with athletes from the NBA, NHL, NFL, USTA, professional boxing and various NCAA sports, as well as guided Film and television actors in preparing for roles.

Gunnar Peterson works out up to nine clients a day at his Beverly Hills gym, and they're often a mix of pro athletes and movie stars. J-Lo says he's the best trainer she's ever had, Sly Stallone was so grateful for Peterson's help he cast the trainer in Rocky Balboa, and after Pete Sampras won the 2002 U.S. Open he gave Peterson a racquet signed THANKS FOR EXTENDING MY CAREER.

— Sports Illustrated

Sports Illustrated has called him a "Fitness Guru" and "Trainer to the Stars". Discovery Health features his diet and fitness tips. Today/ MSNBC quotes excerpts from his book detailing how to shape up attitudes and bodies. CNN quotes Gunnar's philosophy: "Get on a regular routine. Exercise should be a cornerstone of your life, like brushing your teeth. It's not even an option to blow it off."

=== Author, videos and business products ===
Peterson released his first book, G-Force, in January 2005 (Regan Books). Outlined in the book are what Peterson calls the four "F-words" – Function, Foundation, Freedom and Focus.

He serves as an editor and writes a regular column for Muscle and Fitness magazine, is on the advisory board for Fitness magazine, and has been a contributing editor for Glamour magazine as well as a contributor for Clean Eating.

Peterson is regularly featured in Allure, Elle, InStyle, In Touch Weekly, US Weekly, Men's Health, Women's Health, Self and other magazines. His television appearances include The Today Show, Fox & Friends, CNN, CNN Headline News, The Big Idea with Donny Deutsch, Extra, shows for E! and VH1, and as a fitness expert on reality television shows.

As developer of the "Core Secrets" workout, Gunnar created a series of 18 home fitness DVDs by the same name.

Peterson teamed up with Molly Sims for the National PetFit Challenge and has created pet and pet owner videos with exercise programs for dogs and cats.

Through his own fitness product development company, Outside Shot, Peterson created The Bottom Line, a body exercise machine, The RAC, an accessory that incorporates weighted upper body work with Spinning, and Hoop Hands, a basketball-specific resistance training aid.

In 2017, Peterson was hired as a celebrity trainer to promote telepresence fitness instruction offered by a Maryland-based company.

== Personal life ==
He is divorced from Janet Crown, daughter of billionaire Lester Crown and granddaughter of Junius Myer Schine. The couple had three children. He then married Jessica Friedman and had two more children before moving with his family to Nashville, Tennessee.
