= Fred Fisher (lawyer) =

Figure in the Army–McCarthy hearings (1921–1989)

President of the Massachusetts Bar Association
- In office 1973–1974

Personal details
- Born: Frederick George Fisher Jr. April 19, 1921 Brockton, Massachusetts, U.S.
- Died: May 25, 1989 (aged 68) Tel Aviv, Israel
- Parent(s): Frederick George Fisher; Genevieve Clark
- Education: Bowdoin College; Harvard Law School
- Profession: Lawyer
- Known for: Role in the Army–McCarthy hearings

Military service
- Allegiance: United States
- Branch/service: United States Army Signal Corps
- Battles/wars: World War II

Frederick George Fisher Jr. (April 19, 1921 – May 25, 1989) was an American lawyer who first entered the public eye in connection with Senator Joseph McCarthy.

== Life and career ==
Fisher was born in Brockton, Massachusetts, the son of Genevieve (Clark) and Frederick George Fisher. He graduated from Bowdoin College in 1942, summa cum laude. After serving in the Army Signal Corps during World War II, he attended Harvard Law School. He graduated in 1948 and joined the law firm of Hale and Dorr in Boston.

In 1954, the firm represented the U.S. Army at the Army–McCarthy hearings on Senator Joseph McCarthy's conduct. Fisher and James D. St. Clair were the two attorneys initially sent to Washington, D.C. to assist Joseph Welch. On questioning them, Welch learned of Fisher's having belonged to the National Lawyers Guild while in law school and shortly after. Welch decided that that left-wing association made Fisher's participation in the hearings a potential problem, and a colleague, John Kimball, Jr., replaced Fisher on the case.

Fisher's name was prominently publicized when McCarthy intimated on national television that Welch should get Fisher fired as a Communist, and that Welch had specifically chosen him for the abortive assignment. Welch dismissed Fisher's association with the NLG as a youthful indiscretion and attacked McCarthy for naming the young man before a nationwide television audience without prior warning or previous agreement to do so, famously stating:

Until this moment, Senator, I think I have never really gauged your cruelty or your recklessness. Fred Fisher is a young man who went to the Harvard Law School and came into my firm and is starting what looks to be a brilliant career with us.… Little did I dream you could be so reckless and so cruel as to do an injury to that lad. It is true he is still with Hale and Dorr. It is true that he will continue to be with Hale and Dorr. It is, I regret to say, equally true that I fear he shall always bear a scar needlessly inflicted by you. If it were in my power to forgive you for your reckless cruelty I would do so. I like to think I am a gentle man but your forgiveness will have to come from someone other than me.

When McCarthy tried to renew his attack, Welch interrupted him:

Senator, may we not drop this? We know he belonged to the Lawyers Guild.… Let us not assassinate this lad further, Senator. You've done enough. Have you no sense of decency, sir? At long last, have you left no sense of decency?

McCarthy tried to ask Welch another question about Fisher, and Welch cut him off:

Mr. McCarthy, I will not discuss this further with you. You have sat within six feet of me and could have asked me about Fred Fisher. You have seen fit to bring it out, and if there is a God in Heaven it will do neither you nor your cause any good. I will not discuss it further.

The gallery erupted in applause.

These proceedings have been recorded in the documentary film Point of Order. Fisher's work for the Lawyers Guild had been confirmed by Welch several weeks earlier in a New York Times article, which in turn led McCarthy to insinuate that Fisher was a communist during the hearings. Fisher went on to become a partner at Hale and Dorr. In 1973–74, he served as president of the Massachusetts Bar Association.

In 1989, Fisher died in Tel Aviv, Israel, where he was lecturing. In his New York Times obituary, Fisher was referred to as a "McCarthy target."

== Legacy ==
In the 1977 made-for-television film Tail Gunner Joe, the scene was re-enacted with Burgess Meredith portraying Welch and Peter Boyle as McCarthy.
