= James Crown =

American businessman and heir (1953–2023)

Jim Crown
- Born: James Schine Crown; June 25, 1953; Chicago, Illinois, U.S.
- Died: June 25, 2023 (aged 70); Woody Creek, Colorado, U.S
- Education: Hampshire College (BA); Stanford University (JD)
- Spouse: Paula Hannaway
- Children: 4
- Relatives: Lester Crown (father); Susan Crown (sister); Henry Crown (grandfather); Junius Myer Schine (grandfather); G. David Schine (uncle)

James Schine Crown (June 25, 1953 – June 25, 2023) was an American businessman and heir. He was president of Henry Crown and Company, a family investment company. Crown was a director of JPMorgan Chase & Co., General Dynamics and Sara Lee. He was also the managing partner of the Aspen Skiing Company.

== Early life ==
Crown was born the son of Renée (née Schine) and Lester Crown. His mother was the sister of producer G. David Schine and the daughter of theater and hotel magnate, Junius Myer Schine. His grandfather was Chicago industrialist Henry Crown. His sister was Susan Crown.

== Career ==
In 1976, Crown earned a Bachelor of Arts from Hampshire College in Amherst, Massachusetts, and a Juris Doctor from Stanford Law School in 1980. He served as chairman of the board of trustees of the University of Chicago from 2003 to 2009. After law school, Crown worked as an associate for Salomon Brothers in New York City where he became a vice president in the Capital Markets Service Group in 1983.

In 1985, he returned to Chicago to join his family's investment firm. He became president in 2002 and chairman and chief executive in 2018.

In June 2023, Crown served as the chairman of the Commercial Club of Chicago Civic Committee's public safety task force.

== Personal life and death ==
In 1985, Crown married Paula Hannaway, a 1980 magna cum laude A.B. graduate of Duke University and 2012 M.A. graduate of School of the Art Institute of Chicago. The couple had four children.

Crown died in a single vehicle crash at the Aspen Motorsports Park in Woody Creek, Colorado, on June 25, 2023, his 70th birthday.
