= Roger Lewis (businessman) =

American business executive

- Born: January 11, 1912; Los Angeles, California, U.S.
- Died: November 12, 1987 (aged 75); Washington, D.C., U.S.
- Education: Stanford University
- Occupation: Business executive
- Known for: Formerly Chairman/Chief Executive Officer of General Dynamics and President of Amtrak
- Spouse: Elly Thummler
- Children: 3

Roger Lewis (January 11, 1912 – November 12, 1987) was an American business executive. He was the CEO of General Dynamics from 1962 to 1970 and was the first CEO of Amtrak from 1971 to 1975. From 1953 to 1955, he was the Assistant United States Secretary of the Air Force.

== Early life and education ==
Roger Lewis was born in Los Angeles and graduated from Stanford University in 1934.

== Career ==
After college, he worked at Lockheed in the sheet metal shop. He remained with Lockheed in progressively higher positions through World War II when he was the company's director of materiel. After Lockheed, he went to Canadair and, in 1950, took a job as vice president of sales and management for Curtiss-Wright.

In 1953, President Dwight Eisenhower nominated him as the Assistant Secretary of the Air Force for Materiel. The Senate confirmed his nomination on April 3, 1953, and he was sworn in on April 4. Eisenhower awarded him the Medal of Freedom for his service. After leaving the government, he went to work for Pan Am in its defense projects.

In 1962, Henry Crown, the majority shareholder of General Dynamics recruited Lewis to take over as the president of the company, which had experienced sharp losses in 1960 and 1961 after the company wrote off development costs in its jet program.

General Dynamics suffered some setbacks during Lewis' tenure. He worked to push Crown off the company's board and borrowed heavily to buy Crown's preferred stock for $100 million. The F-111 program suffered from safety concerns and the United States Navy cancelled its orders for F-111B's in 1968. In 1970, the company's reported net earnings of only $2.5 million for 1969. That figure was challenged by associates of Crown, who had bought back shares in the company at depressed prices and regained a board seat. An analysis by Crown suggested that the financials should have shown a $12.1 million loss. The allegations led to a shareholder lawsuit against the company. As the company's Quincy Shipbuilding Division, which Lewis acquired in 1964, and its Stromberg-Carlson divisions weighed on the financial results in 1970 and the dividend was pulled, Crown proposed hiring David S. Lewis to the board as the new chairman and CEO.

In 1971, Lewis was nominated as the first CEO of Amtrak, taking the reins of the passenger rail operations of the major railroads. Although the initial year of Amtrak was troubled as the company ran out of funds and had little left over for capital expenditure, by the end of 1972, passenger traffic was up 11% and revenues were up. Lewis ordered UAC TurboTrains, improved reservations and on-board services. However, Lewis was criticized as the company shed half of its passenger routes after they were assumed. Lewis announced his resignation from Amtrak in 1974 and was succeeded by Paul Reistrup.

After leaving Amtrak, Lewis worked with companies in finance and telecommunications.

== Death ==
Lewis died on November 12, 1987, at the age of 75.

Business positions
Preceded by position created	CEO of Amtrak; 1971 – 1975	Succeeded by Paul Reistrup
