= G. David Schine in Hell =

Play written by Tony Kushner

G. David Schine in Hell is a one-act play written by Tony Kushner. It was first published in the New York Times Magazine in 1996 under the title "A Backstage Pass to Hell". It was published as a part of the Kushner anthology Death and Taxes: Hydriotaphia and Other Plays in 2000 by the Theatre Communications Group.

== Plot ==
The play centers on G. David Schine, who arrives in Hell, described as resembling a "dinner theater in Orange County California", and is re-united with Roy Cohn, Richard Nixon, Whittaker Chambers, and J. Edgar Hoover. Many of the characters are dressed in drag—Hoover, for example, is wearing a "black Chanel dress, hose and stiletto pumps"—and Nixon bemoans the "gender confusion" rampant in hell.

== Background ==
Kushner writes in the introduction of Death and Taxes that G. David Schine in Hell was written as a "year-end roundup of deceased notable Americans", and that Times’s policy required him to edit out "much of the profanity in the piece".

The play is noted for its similarity with Kushner's 1993 hit Angels in America: A Gay Fantasia on National Themes due to the appearance of Roy Cohn, the characteristic "mixture of history, fantasy, and outrageous humor", and the "depiction of the traditional battles between the twentieth century's conservative and liberal political poles".
