= Francis Newton Littlejohn =

Francis Newton Littlejohn, Sr. (July 20, 1908 – November 24, 2005) was the news director at the American Broadcasting Company that made the decision to cover the Army-McCarthy Hearings live, from gavel to gavel. He resigned from ABC in 1961.
