= Diamond Hill Baptist Church =

Historic church in Virginia, US

- U.S. National Register of Historic Places
- U.S. Historic district – Contributing property
- Virginia Landmarks Register
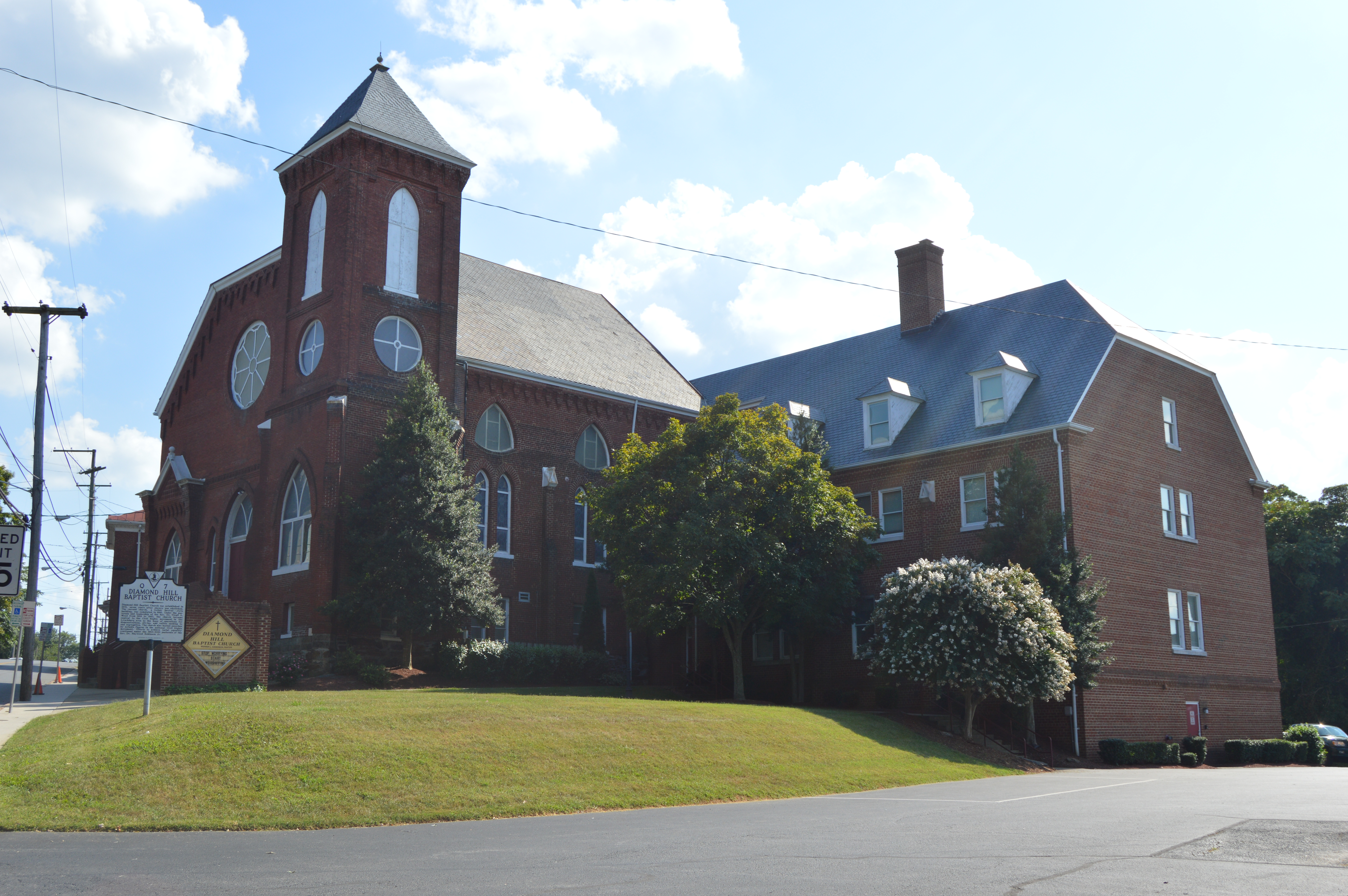
- Overview from the north

- Location within Virginia Location within the United States
- Location: 1415 Grace St., Lynchburg, Virginia
- Coordinates: 37°24′27″N 79°8′37″W
- Area: Less than 1 acre (0.40 ha)
- Built: 1937
- Architect: Lewis Bolling
- Architectural style: Late Gothic Revival
- NRHP reference No.: 11000026
- VLR No.: 118-0060-0057

Significant dates
- Added to NRHP: February 22, 2011
- Designated VLR: December 16, 2010

Diamond Hill Baptist Church is a historic African-American Baptist church located at Lynchburg, Virginia. It was built in 1886, and is a three-story, L-shaped, brick church building in the Late Gothic Revival style. It has brick buttresses capped with limestone, Gothic pointed arched windows, a three-story entrance tower with steeple, and a jerkinhead roof. From 1958 to 1963 the pastor was Virgil Wood, the pastor most associated with the Civil Rights Movement in Lynchburg.

Individually listed on the National Register of Historic Places in 2011, it is located in the Diamond Hill Historic District.
