= Diamond Hill Historic District =

Historic district in Virginia, United States

- U.S. National Register of Historic Places
- U.S. Historic district
- Virginia Landmarks Register
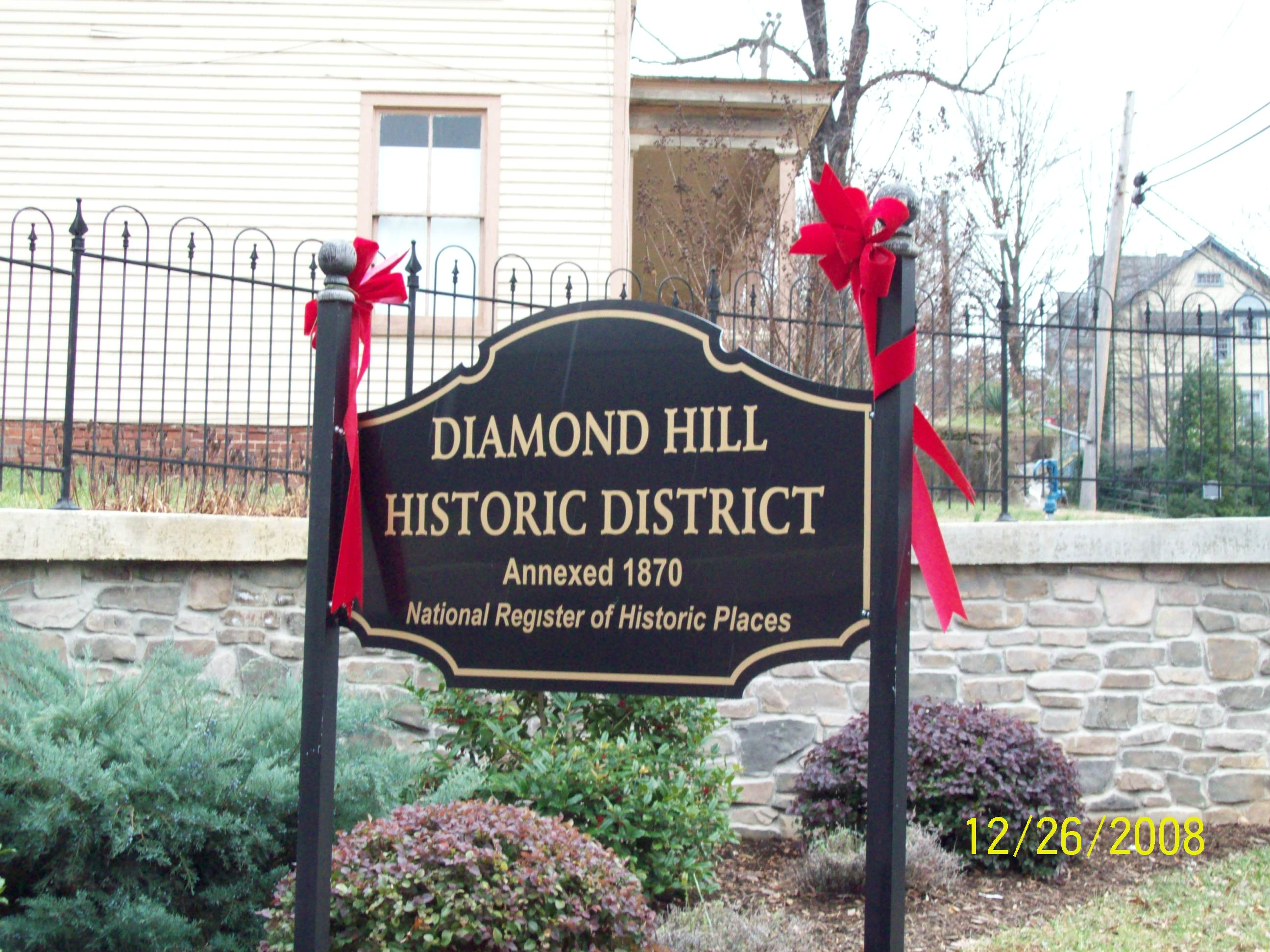
- Diamond Hill Historic District Sign, December 2008

- Location within Virginia Location within the United States
- Location: Roughly bounded by Dunbar Dr., Main, Jackson and Arch Sts., Grace St. Lynchburg, Virginia
- Coordinates: 37°24′31″N 79°8′23″W
- Area: 45 acres (18 ha)
- Built: 1817
- Architectural style: Colonial Revival, Late Victorian
- NRHP reference No.: 79003283; 83003290
- VLR No.: 118-0060

Significant dates
- Added to NRHP: October 1, 1979
- Boundary increase: April 14, 1983
- Designated VLR: May 15, 1979, April 19, 1983

The Diamond Hill Historic District is a national historic district located in Lynchburg, Virginia. The district is irregularly shaped and approximately 14 blocks in area. It is wedged between the Lynchburg Expressway (Rt. 29) to the south and the city's central commercial core to the north. Most houses on Diamond Hill were erected during the late 19th and early 20th centuries and range from speculative houses to upper-middle-class residences. The more formidable residences line Washington and Clay streets and include a high number of Georgian Revival and Colonial Revival houses. Located in the district is the separately listed Diamond Hill Baptist Church.

It was listed on the National Register of Historic Places in 1979 and expanded in 1983.

== Gallery ==
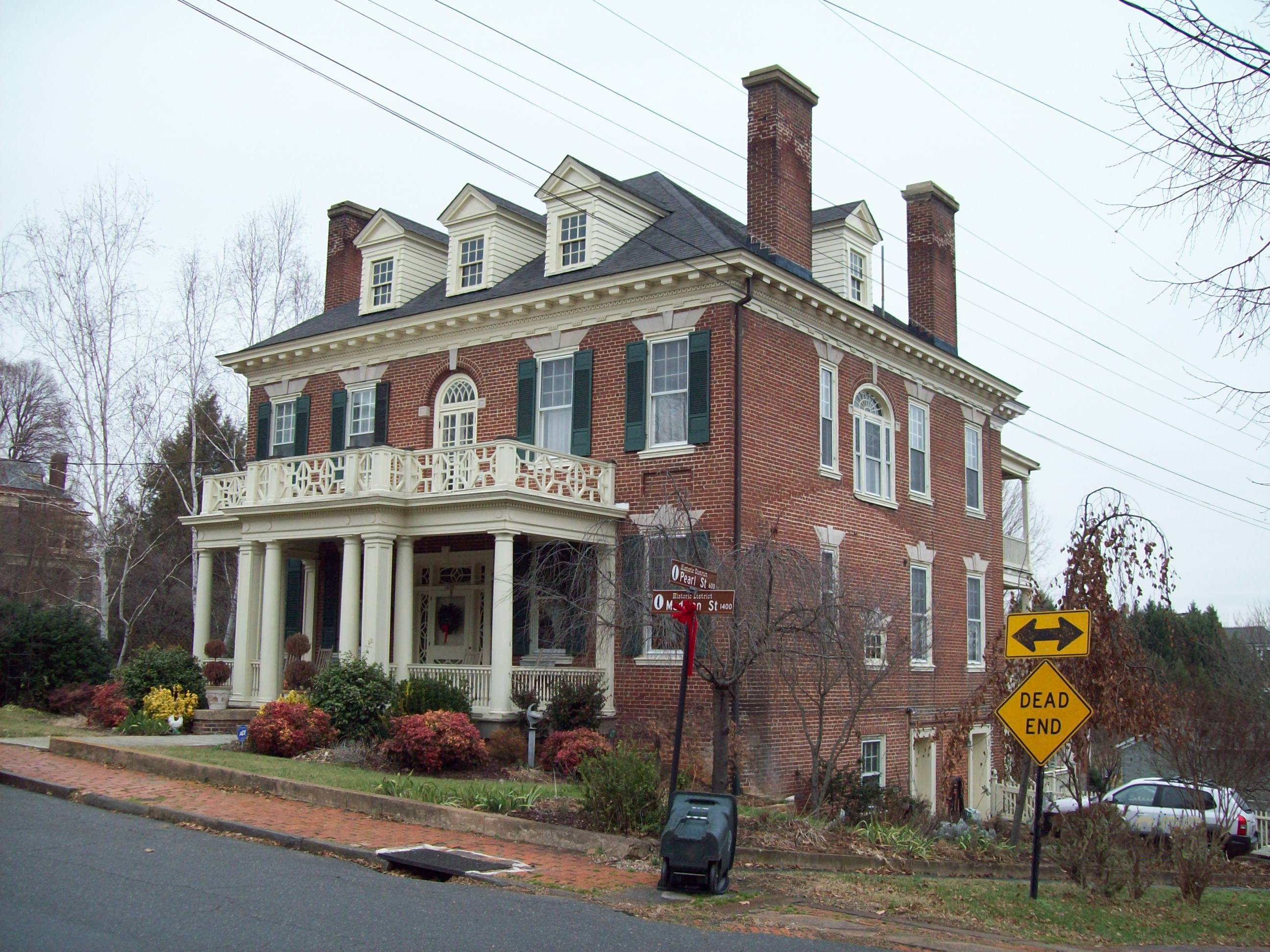
Diamond Hill Historic District house, Lynchburg VA, December 2008

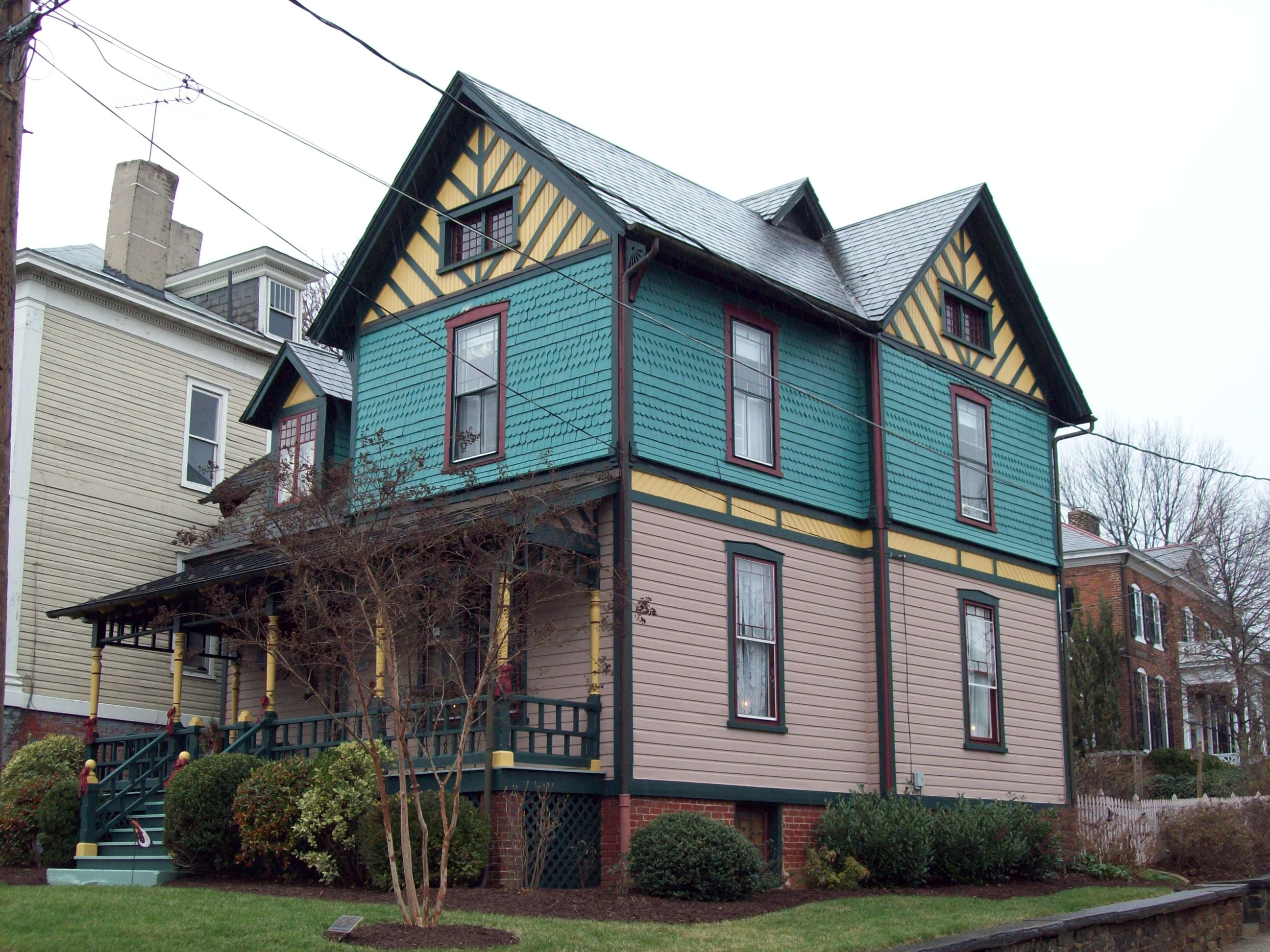
Diamond Hill Historic District house, Lynchburg VA, December 2008

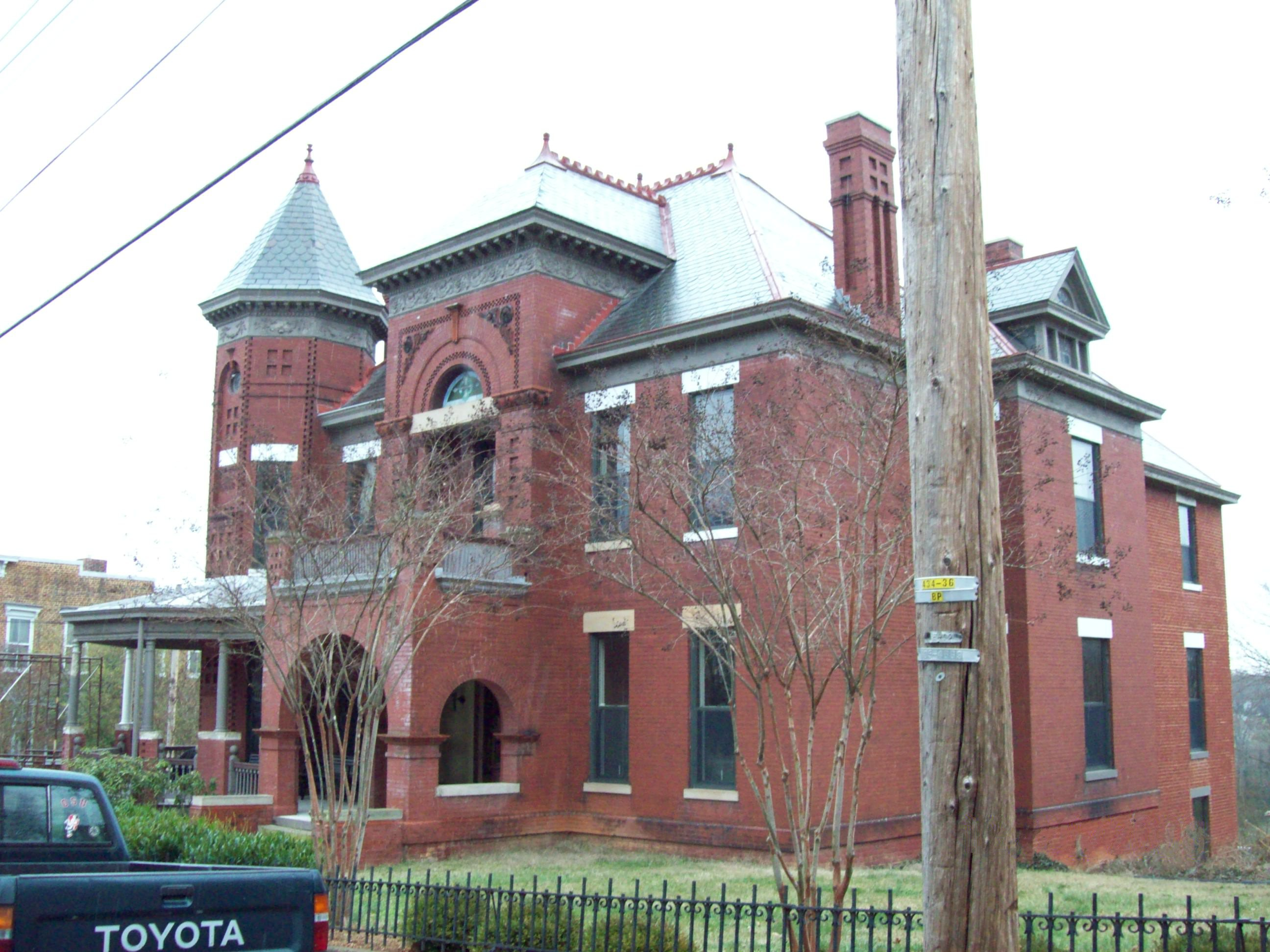
Diamond Hill Historic District house, Lynchburg VA, December 2008
