= Lester Crown =

American businessman (born 1925)

- Born: June 7, 1925 (age 101); Chicago, Illinois, U.S.
- Education: Northwestern University (BS); Harvard University (MBA)
- Known for: General Dynamics
- Spouse: Renee Schine (m. 1950)
- Children: 7, including James Crown and Susan Crown Kunkler
- Father: Henry Crown
- Relatives: G. David Schine (brother-in-law); Junius Myer Schine (father-in-law); Gunnar Peterson (former son-in-law)

Lester Crown (born June 7, 1925) is an American businessman and the son of Chicago financier Henry Crown (1896–1990), who created the Material Service Corporation with two brothers in 1919, which merged with General Dynamics in 1959.

Crown has been a perennial member of the Forbes 400 list since 1982. He controls family holdings, including large stakes in Maytag, Hilton Hotels, Alltel, Aspen Skiing Company, New York's Rockefeller Center, and pro basketball's Chicago Bulls. He also holds a 13% stake in the New York Yankees, an increase from 10% when he was an original limited partner with George Steinbrenner's investment group in 1973. Presumably, the large stake held in Bank One at the time of the 2003 Forbes 400 listing has converted to JPMorgan Chase stock and was derived from an interest in First Chicago Bank, which was enumerated in the 1998 Forbes 400 list as First Chicago NBD shares. Recent achievements include brokering a controversial agreement to expand O'Hare International Airport, and spearheading the funding of the new Cook County Hospital (Stroger Hospital). He is the chairman of the Commercial Club of Chicago and Chicago Council on Global Affairs.

== Early life ==
Born in Chicago on June 7, 1925, Crown is the son of Rebecca (née Kranz) and Henry Crown and was raised in Evanston, Illinois. He is of Jewish descent. During high school, he worked at the family business, Material Service Corporation (merged into General Dynamics in 1959). His mother died in 1943. Crown received a B.S. in chemical engineering from Northwestern University in 1946 and an M.B.A. from Harvard University in 1949.

== Career ==
Crown was president of Marblehead Lime Co, as well as the president of Royal Crown RC Cola from 1956 to 1966. During the 1950s, the Crown family had a controlling interest in New York's Empire State Building. He has been the president and chair of General Dynamics. He was president of Henry Crown & Co. from 1969 to 2002, then chairman until 2018. He is a former director of Continental Illinois bank, Trans World Airlines, Maytag, and Esmark. In the 1980s, he gradually took over the family business, Henry Crown & Co, from his father.

== Affiliations ==
Affiliations include: Trusteeship of Northwestern University, the Aspen Institute and the Michael Reese Health Trust. Crown is on the Board of Directors of Lyric Opera and Children's Memorial Hospital, and the America Abroad Media advisory board. He is a member of Lake Shore Country Club, Northmoor Country Club, Standard Club, Economic Club of Chicago, and Northwestern University's John Evans Club. He is a Deputy Chair of the International Board of the Weizmann Institute of Science in Israel and a member of the Tel Aviv University's Board of Governors. Crown is also involved with The Crown Center for Middle East Studies at Brandeis University. He donated the initial $10 million gift that started the center in 2005. He and the rest of his family are involved with the Crown Fellows program in American history at Brandeis, as well.

With his wife Renee Helene Schine Crown, he funded the honors program at Syracuse University. In 1984, Renee Schine made a $2,500,000 contribution to Syracuse University for the Schine Student Center, which opened in October 1985.

== Political views ==
In a 2008 letter to voters Crown expressed his support for Barack Obama, the Democratic Presidential Candidate:

While my involvement in politics is motivated by a variety of issues, there is one issue that is fundamental: My deep commitment to Israel and to a strong U.S.-Israel relationship that strengthens both Israel's security and its efforts to seek peace," Crown wrote. "I am writing to share with you my confidence that Senator Barack Obama's stellar record on Israel gives me great comfort that, as President, he will be the friend to Israel that we all want to see in the White House - stalwart in his defense of Israel's security, and committed to helping Israel achieve peace with its neighbors."

In April 2013, Crown was one of 100 prominent American Jews who signed a letter to Israeli Prime Minister Benjamin Netanyahu urging him to "work closely" with Secretary of State John Kerry "to devise pragmatic initiatives, consistent with Israel's security needs, which would represent Israel's readiness to make painful territorial sacrifices for the sake of peace."

== Personal life ==
In 1950, he married Renée Schine at the Waldorf Astoria. His wife is the sister of producer G. David Schine and daughter of theater and hotel magnate, Junius Myer Schine. They have seven children: A. Steven Crown, James Crown, Patricia Crown, Susan Crown Kunkler, Daniel Crown, Sara Crown Star, and Janet Crown Peterson.

Their son James (1953–2023) succeeded him as the President and Chairman of Henry Crown & Co. A daughter, Janet, is founder and owner of Burn 60 Fitness Studios and is divorced from celebrity trainer Gunnar Peterson. Among his seven children are board members of several major cultural institutions. Another daughter, Susan, is chairwoman of the Shoah Foundation. Together the family's net worth exceeds ten billion dollars, as of December 2020.

== Awards ==
Crown received the Golden Plate Award of the American Academy of Achievement in 1989. He was inducted as a Laureate of The Lincoln Academy of Illinois and awarded the Order of Lincoln (the State's highest honor) by the Governor of Illinois in 1999 in the area of Business and Social Service. Crown, alongside his wife, received the Blessed are the Peacemakers Award from Catholic Theological Union in 2012.

== See also ==
- List of billionaires
