= Point of Order (film) =

1963 documentary film by Emile de Antonio

Point of Order!
- Directed by: Emile de Antonio
- Produced by: Emile de Antonio and Daniel Talbot
- Edited by: Robert Duncan
- Production company: Point Films
- Distributed by: Continental Distributing
- Release date: September 1963 (New York)
- Running time: 97 minutes
- Country: United States
- Language: English

Point of Order! is a 1963 American documentary film by Emile de Antonio about the Senate Army–McCarthy hearings of 1954.

== Background ==
The Army–McCarthy hearings came about when the Army accused Senator Joseph McCarthy of improperly pressuring the Army for special privileges for Private G. David Schine, formerly of McCarthy's investigative staff. McCarthy counter-charged that the Army was holding Schine hostage to keep him from searching for Communists in the Army. The hearings were broadcast live on television in their entirety and also recorded via kinescope. This film was created from those kinescope recordings.

== Synopsis ==
The film uses selections from the hearings to show the overall development of the trial, beginning with introductions from several main participants, such as Joseph N. Welch and McCarthy. Each participant is shown in a still image with a brief audio recording, except for McCarthy, who is introduced with longer footage of a speech he made during the hearings.

In a sequence titled "Charge and Countercharge", Senator Stuart Symington summarizes the principal charge and counter-charge of the case. This sequence includes questioning of Roy Cohn for allegedly threatening to "wreck the army" if David Schine were not made a General, a statement Cohn denies. The film follows with a scene in which the Army counsel questions the origin of a photograph of that shows Schine in a meeting with Secretary of the Army Robert T. Stevens; the photograph is shown to be cropped to suggest a closer relationship between Schine and Stevens, but McCarthy's counsel denies any knowledge of photographic alteration.

A sequence titled "The Accusation" shows McCarthy accusing a member of Welch's law firm (Fred Fisher) of membership in the National Lawyer's Guild, which McCarthy and others accused of serving the interests of the Communist Party USA. The sequence includes a frequently quoted exchange from the hearings: Welch asks McCarthy, "Have you no sense of decency, sir, at long last? Have you left no sense of decency?"

The film ends with a heated exchange between Symington and McCarthy that occurred when the hearings were about to adjourn for the day. Symington sharply questions the handling of McCarthy's secret files by his staff. McCarthy calls this a "smear" against the men on his staff; and, as Symington starts to leave, McCarthy accuses him of using "the same tactics that the Communist Party has used for too long." Symington returns to the microphone and says: "Apparently every time anybody says anything against anybody working for Senator McCarthy, he is declaring them and accusing them of being Communists!" Symington leaves and the hearings adjourn. McCarthy continues his passionate but repetitious defense of his staff and his attack on Symington, speaking to an increasingly empty chamber. The actual end to the hearings, in which McCarthy was cleared of any wrongdoing, does not appear in the film.

== Production ==
Point of Order! was first imagined by Emile de Antonio and Daniel Talbot in 1961. De Antonio and Talbot thought a film about the Army–McCarthy hearings could be successful at Henry Rosenberg's New Yorker Theater. De Antonio persuaded Richard Ellison at CBS to help him find footage of the Army–McCarthy Hearings; Ellison informed de Antonio that the network held a complete set of kinescopes for the hearings. These kinescopes totaled nearly 188 hours. Talbot initially asked Orson Welles, then Irving Lerner to direct the film, but neither man agreed to do so. Talbot hired Paul Falkenberg to edit the film, and Falkenberg asked Richard Rovere to write narration for the film, to be read by Mike Wallace. However, when Falkenberg screened a rough cut of the film for the producers, they did not approve and decided to start over. De Antonio offered to direct the film for free, which Talbot accepted.

De Antonio hired a young editor named Robert Duncan to help edit the film. Their plan was to remove any narration, music, or added scenes and create a documentary using only the footage from the kinescopes of the hearings. This approach to filmmaking—which de Antonio would use on later films—was similar to the use of assemblage in the works of modern artists like Robert Rauschenberg, who was a friend of de Antonio. De Antonio said that his two main decisions with regard to making the film were "only footage from the actual hearings would be used" and "no preaching."

== Exhibition ==
The film premiered in New York City in conjunction with the first New York Film Festival at the Museum of Modern Art in September 1963. It was released in New York on January 14, 1964. It was distributed by Continental Distributing in 103 theaters nationwide. In 1968 it was recut and shown on television, with an added introduction by Paul Newman, to provide context for audiences unfamiliar with the Army–McCarthy hearings.

Several versions of Point of Order! have appeared on the home video market in the United States. The version with the Newman introduction was released by Zenger Video in 1984, with added instructional materials for classroom use. This version ran 102 minutes. In 1986, MPI Home Video released an abridged 49-minute version (with the Newman Introduction) under the title McCarthy, Death of a Witch Hunter: a Film of the Era of Senator Joseph R. McCarthy. Point of Order! was released on DVD by New Yorker Films in 2005, in its original 97-minute cut.

== Reception ==
The Museum of Modern Art suggested that Point of Order may not be strictly defined as a film. De Antonio wrote that Point of Order! "may have been the first political documentary in the U.S. after World War II as well as a documentary which, in opposition to prevailing trends, also changed the form of documentary."

Critical reception to the film was largely positive. Among its proponents were Dwight Macdonald, Susan Sontag, Brendan Gill, and Stanley Kaufmann. Even Roy Cohn wrote about the film's historical significance, despite disagreement over the film's portrayals of him and Senator McCarthy. Some film critics felt that what de Antonio made was different from what most understood as a documentary. Judith Crist wrote in the New York Herald Tribune that "the producers have excerpted a superdocumentary instead of creating one of their own."

The Washington Daily News remarked that the "innate evil of the greatest demagogue since Adolf Hitler" was "vividly, dramatically and tragically shown" in the documentary.

At the time of its 1964 release, the U.S. Communist Party newspaper The Daily World called the documentary a "disappointing frustration." The reviewer observed that nothing was said about the "many thousands of men and women hounded out of jobs and professions," and "bypasses in silence all that led up to the Army hearings."

Film critic J. Hoberman, writing in the New York Times when the documentary was revived in 1998, remarked that "Point of Order is the first documentary feature to treat American politics as spectacle, as well as a portrait of the first American politician to achieve full media symbiosis." Hoberman wrote: "An electronic cave painting from the dawn of the media-saturated age, Point of Order demonstrates the way that television inevitably recasts news as entertainment, subsumes politics in personality, elevates anecdote to history and, in the final analysis, substitutes its own flickering image for collective memory."

== Book tie-in ==
In 1964, W.W. Norton & Company published the book Point of Order! A Documentary of the Army–McCarthy Hearings, in book form. The 108-page book featured still photos captured from the kinescopes of CBS. David T. Bazelon wrote the introduction and epilogue.

== Honors ==
In 1993, this film was selected for preservation in the United States National Film Registry by the Library of Congress as being "culturally, historically, or aesthetically significant".

== See also ==
- List of American films of 1963
- Joseph McCarthy
- Roy Cohn
- Army–McCarthy hearings
