= Junius Myer Schine =

American businessman (1890–1971)

- Junius Schine and Hildegarde Feldman circa 1940-1950
- Born: February 20, 1890; Latvia
- Died: May 8, 1971 (aged 81); Manhattan, New York City, US
- Known for: Hotels and theaters
- Spouse: Hildegarde Feldman
- Children: 4, including Gerard David Schine
- Relatives: Lester Crown (son-in-law); James Crown (grandson); Susan Crown (granddaughter)

Junius Myer Schine (February 20, 1890 – May 8, 1971), often called J. Myer Schine, was a New York theater and hotel magnate whose holdings comprised 185 movie theaters, notably Glove Theatre and Schines Auburn Theatre, and several hotels, including Ambassador Hotel.

== Biography ==
He was born on February 20 or February 28, 1890 to a Jewish family in Latvia, Russian Empire. In 1902 as an eleven-year-old, he, his brother Louis Schine (1892–1977), age nine, and their mother Anne emigrated to join their father in Gloversville, New York.

He married Hildegarde Feldman (1903–1994). They had four children, Doris June (married name Maxwell), Renee Helene (wife of Lester Crown), Gerard David (usually known as G. David or David), and Charles Richard.

In 1957 Junius chose his son David, a central figure in the Army-McCarthy Hearings of 1954, to head Schine Enterprises, but in 1963 Junius resumed his position as head of the company. In 1965 Schine's holdings were bought by Lawrence Wien and Harry B. Helmsley. Junius died on May 9, 1971, in Manhattan, New York City.

== Legacy ==
Renee Helene Schine Crown made a $2,500,000 contribution to Syracuse University in 1984 for the Schine Student Center, which opened in October 1985.

== Patent ==
In 1965 Schine received Patent GB1002524 for a golf training apparatus that evaluated whether a stroke was a slice or a hook and calculated the distance the golf ball would have gone.
