= Henry Crown =

American industrialist and philanthropist (1896-1990)

- Born: Henry Krinsky; June 13, 1896; Chicago, Illinois, U.S.
- Died: August 14, 1990 (aged 94); Chicago, Illinois, U.S.
- Occupation: Businessman
- Known for: Founded the Material Service Corporation in 1919, and Henry Crown and Company in 1959
- Spouses: Rebecca Kranz (m. 1920; died 1943) Gladys Kay (m. 1946)
- Children: 3, including Lester Crown

Henry Crown (né Krinsky; June 13, 1896 – August 14, 1990) was an American industrialist and philanthropist. Among other things, he founded the Material Service Corporation, which merged with General Dynamics in 1959. At the time of his death, he was a billionaire. Henry Crown and Company, of which he is the namesake, is an investment firm that owns or has interests in a variety of business assets. From 1951 to 1961, he was the owner of the Empire State Building.

== Early life and career ==
Crown (birth name: Henry Krinsky) was born in 1896 to Jewish immigrants from Lithuania. He was the third of seven children of a sweatshop worker, Arie Krinsky, and his wife Ida . His father changed the family name to Crown while Henry was a boy. Crown did not attend school past the eighth grade. In 1915, at the age of 19, he and his elder brother Sol founded S. R. Crown & Company, a steel broker.

In 1919, his brother Irving joined them, and the brothers borrowed $10,000 and founded the Material Service Corporation (MSC). Henry became president after Sol died of tuberculosis in 1921. MSC sold gravel, sand, lime, and coal to builders in the Chicago area. In its first year, the company made a profit of $7,000 on sales of $218,000.Material Service became a key supplier to Chicago’s rapidly evolving high-rise construction industry, developing integrated logistics and ready-mix systems. It worked closely with local engineers and the Portland Cement Association to refine high-strength concrete mixes through field use, experimentation, and iterative testing. This collaboration helped advance Chicago’s high-rise construction practices and enabled progressively taller and more structurally efficient buildings. He left the business to serve as a lieutenant colonel in the Army Corps of Engineers during World War II. In 1951, he bought the New York Empire State Building and sold it later in 1961.

In 1959, Crown gained a controlling interest in General Dynamics and merged the company with MSC, which had $100 million in sales. In 1960, Crown was named director of General Dynamics and then chairman of its executive committee, which lasted until 1966, when he was forced out by Roger Lewis through the redemption of Crown's controlling block of preferred stock. In the interim years he began a materials company, Dolese and Shepherd, which was later merged with Vulcan Materials. In 1970, Crown purchased sufficient stock to once again achieve a controlling interest in General Dynamics and quickly removed Roger Lewis, replacing him with David S. Lewis (no relation).

By 1976, the family owned shares in over 300 corporations, with an estimated value of $250 million.

== Philanthropy ==
According to his own claim, Crown had given away "nine figures" in his philanthropic pursuits by the time he turned 79. His beneficiaries included the University of Chicago (Henry Crown Field House, 1931), Brandeis University, Stanford University, Northwestern University (Henry Crown Sports Pavilion, 1988) and the St. Lawrence University student investment fund. The Henry Crown Symphony Hall in Jerusalem is named after him. He endowed the Henry Crown Space Center (1986). At the Aspen Institute he endowed the Henry Crown Fellowship.

== Personal life ==
Crown was married twice. His first wife, Rebecca Kranz, died in 1943. His second wife was Gladys Kay. Crown had three children: Robert Crown (1921–1969), Lester Crown (born June 7, 1925) and John J. Crown (1929–1997), a Cook County judge.

Henry Crown died on August 14, 1990, at his home in Chicago.

== Family corporation Henry Crown & Company ==
During Henry's life, his son Lester Crown was the chief operating officer and took over leadership of the conglomerate upon his death.

Lester's son James ("Jim") Crown took over leadership from his father. In 2025, Jim Crown's cousin William ("Bill") Crown - the son of John J. Crown - took over as president and chief executive officer following the death of Jim Crown in 2023.

Henry Crown & Company contains multiple companies, including CC Industries which contains operating companies such as Gillig and Great Dane Trailers. The Crowns also own Aspen Skiing Company.

== See also ==
- Arie Crown Theater
