= G. David Schine =

Figure in the 1954 Army–McCarthy hearings

David Schine
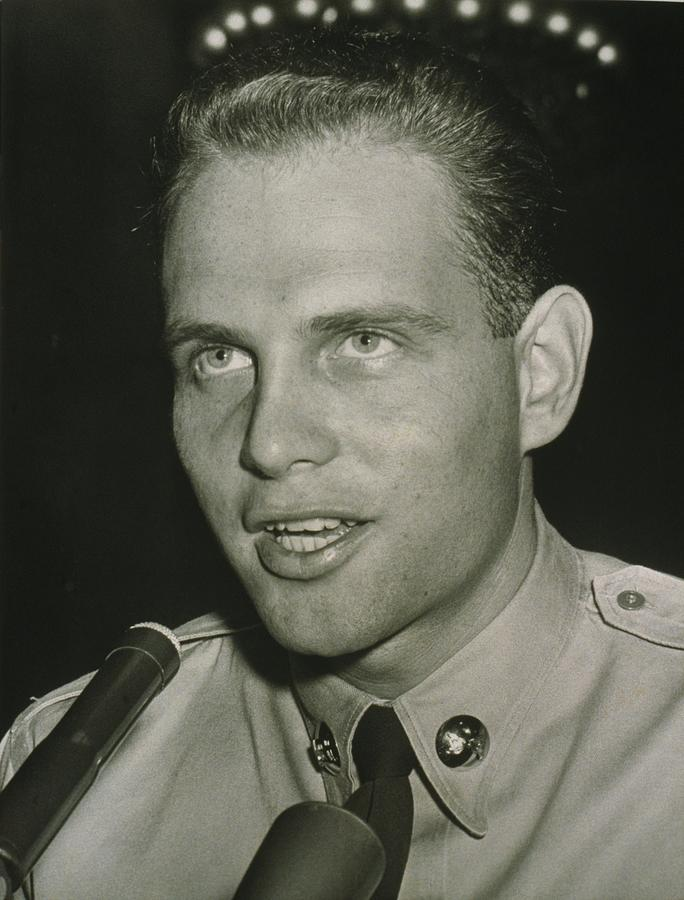
- Schine at the Army-McCarthy hearings, 1954
- Born: Gerard David Schine; September 11, 1927; Gloversville, New York, U.S.
- Died: June 19, 1996 (aged 68); Los Angeles, California, U.S.
- Resting place: Westwood Village Cemetery
- Education: Harvard University (BA)
- Known for: Army–McCarthy hearings
- Spouse: Hillevi Rombin (m. 1957)
- Children: 6
- Relatives: Junius Myer Schine (father); Lester Crown (brother-in-law)

Gerard David Schine, better known as G. David Schine or David Schine (September 11, 1927 – June 19, 1996), was the wealthy heir to a hotel chain fortune who became a central figure in the Army–McCarthy hearings of 1954 in his role as the chief consultant to the Senate Permanent Subcommittee on Investigations. Later in life, he became a part of the film/television industry. He was the executive producer for the 1971 film The French Connection.

== Early life ==
Schine was born in Gloversville, New York, to Jewish parents, hotel magnate Junius Myer Schine and Hildegarde Feldman. He attended Phillips Academy and matriculated at Harvard University in the summer of 1945. He took a leave of absence in the spring of 1946, and returned in the fall of 1947 after a year working as an assistant purser for the Army Transport Service. Though this was a civilian position, he wrote on his application for re-admission to Harvard that he was a "lieutenant in the Army," and other students resented his calling himself a veteran. Said one, "We were all veterans and his pretending to be one went over like a lead balloon." He graduated in 1949.

At Harvard, he lived, according to a later Harvard Crimson portrait, "in a style which went out here with the era of the Gold Coast," the years before World War I when wealthy Harvard students lived apart from their classmates in private accommodations. College administrators denied his requests to use his dormitory room as an office and to allow a female secretary to visit outside of regular visiting hours. He conducted the university band and served as its drum major.

== Anti-communism and Army–McCarthy hearings ==
In 1952, Schine published a six-page anti-communist pamphlet called "Definition of Communism" and had a copy placed in every room of his family's chain of hotels. Although the pamphlet contained many errors, Time called it "remarkably succinct." The pamphlet introduced Schine to Roy Cohn through newspaper columnist George Sokolsky, and the two became friends. Cohn at that time was Senator Joseph McCarthy's chief counsel, and he brought Schine onto McCarthy's staff as an unpaid "chief consultant".

McCarthy-era opponents of Communism sought to stamp out material they viewed as pro-Communist. Schine and Cohn conducted a much-criticized tour of Europe in 1953, examining libraries of the United States Information Agency for books written by authors they deemed to be Communists or fellow travelers. Die Welt of Hamburg called them Schnüffler or snoops. Theodore Kaghan, Deputy Director of the Public Affairs Division in the Office of the U.S. High Commissioner for Germany and a target of the subcommittee, called them "junketeering gumshoes."

In November 1953, Schine was drafted into the United States Army as a private. Cohn immediately began a campaign to obtain special privileges for Schine. Cohn met with and made repeated telephone calls to military officials from the Secretary of the Army down to Schine's company commander. He asked that Schine be given a commission (which the Army refused due to Schine's lack of qualifications) as well as light duties, extra leave, and no overseas assignments. At one point, Cohn was reported to have threatened to "wreck the Army" if his demands were not met. During the Army-McCarthy Hearings of 1954, the Army charged Cohn and McCarthy with using improper pressure to influence the Army, while McCarthy and Cohn counter-charged that the Army was holding Schine "hostage" in order to pressure them into abandoning their investigation of Communist infiltration of the military.

The hearings were broadcast live using the relatively new medium of television and were viewed by an estimated 20 million people. Just prior to the hearings, Schine and Cohn appeared on the cover of Time on March 22, 1954, under the banner "McCarthy and His Men".

The Army–McCarthy hearings absolved McCarthy of any direct wrongdoing, blaming Cohn alone. The exposure of McCarthy and his methods before a television audience, however, is widely considered to have heralded the beginning of the end of his career. Cohn resigned from McCarthy's staff shortly after the hearings.

== Later years ==
After the hearings, Schine left politics and refused to comment on the episode for the rest of his life, so his view of his relationship with Cohn remains unknown. He remained active in the private sector as a businessman and an entrepreneur, working in the hotel, music, and film industries. He was for a time a member of the Young Presidents' Organization. On October 22, 1957, he married Miss Universe of 1955, Hillevi Rombin of Sweden. They had six children and were married for nearly 40 years. Also in 1957, Schine's father named him head of Schine Enterprises, though in 1963 Schine's father resumed his position as head of the company. In 1977, Schine described himself as "retired."

== Television/film/music industry work ==
Schine made a cameo appearance as himself on a 1968 episode of Batman. Schine was executive producer of the 1971 film The French Connection, which was nominated for eight Academy Awards and won five, including Best Picture. In 1977, he produced the documentary That's Action!. Shortly afterwards, Schine was involved with music by The DeFranco Family that achieved Billboard gold and platinum and Cash Box No. 1. Schine's company, Schine Music, also provided songs to Lou Rawls and Bobby Sherman, among others. A musician himself, Schine had music he composed published. He once conducted the Boston Pops Orchestra in place of Arthur Fiedler at a concert celebrating his Harvard University 25th reunion in a performance of Sibelius' Karelia Suite. Some of the musicians refused to play for him and one commented later: "That man ruined my father's life. No way I was going to play for him." Schine's post-production video house in Hollywood, Studio Television Services, handled clients such as HBO, Disney, Orion, and MGM/UA. His publicly traded research and development company, High Resolution Sciences, endeavored for years to bring high definition to broadcast television.

== Filmography ==
Films
Title	Year	Role
The French Connection	1971	Executive producer
That's Action!	1977	Writer/Director

== Death ==
Schine and Hillevi's marriage lasted almost 40 years until their deaths together in 1996 in a private plane accident. Schine, 68, and Hillevi, 62, died on June 19, 1996, along with their 34-year-old son Berndt, who was piloting the plane that crashed in Burbank, California. They were buried at Westwood Village Memorial Park Cemetery in Los Angeles.

== Legacy ==
- A documentary film, Point of Order! (1964), was edited by Emile de Antonio from the kinescope recordings of the Army-McCarthy hearings.
- In the 1992 HBO film Citizen Cohn, Schine is portrayed by Jeffrey Nordling.
- Following Schine's death, playwright Tony Kushner, who previously wrote the Pulitzer-prize winning Angels in America, wrote a one-act play titled G. David Schine in Hell. The play takes place on the day Schine died and portrays Schine as he arrives in hell and is reunited with Roy Cohn, Richard Nixon, Whittaker Chambers, and J. Edgar Hoover.
- Where's My Roy Cohn? (2019)
- Schine appears in the first five episodes of the 2023 Showtime miniseries Fellow Travelers, portrayed by Matt Visser.
