= Tail Gunner Joe =

1977 television movie dramatizing the life of US Senator Joseph McCarthy

- Genre: Biography; Drama
- Written by: Lane Slate
- Directed by: Jud Taylor
- Starring: Peter Boyle; Burgess Meredith; Patricia Neal; John Forsythe; Ned Beatty
- Music by: Billy May
- Country of origin: United States
- Original language: English

Production
- Producer: George Eckstein
- Cinematography: Ric Waite
- Editor: Bernard J. Small
- Running time: 145 min
- Production company: Universal Television

Original release
- Network: NBC
- Release: February 6, 1977

Tail Gunner Joe is a 1977 television movie dramatizing the life of U.S. Senator Joseph R. McCarthy, a Wisconsin Republican who claimed knowledge of communist infiltration of the U.S. government during the 1950s. The film was broadcast on NBC. It was nominated for six Emmy awards and won two: best writing and best supporting actor for Burgess Meredith's portrayal of attorney Joseph N. Welch. It starred Peter Boyle (as McCarthy) and John Forsythe. Robert F. Simon appeared as journalist Drew Pearson.

The nickname 'Tail Gunner Joe' is a derisive term for the Senator that originated from his exaggerated claims of the number of times flying as a tail gunner on American dive bombers during World War II.

== Cast ==
- Peter Boyle as Senator Joseph McCarthy
- Burgess Meredith as Joseph N. Welch
- John Forsythe as Paul Cunningham
- Heather Menzies as Logan
- Charles Cioffi as Logan's Boss
- Jean Stapleton as Mrs. DeCamp
- Philip Abbott as Senator Scott W. Lucas
- Wesley Addy as Middleton
- Ned Beatty as Sylvester
- Karen Carlson as Jean Kerr
- John Carradine as Wisconsin Farmer
- Robert F. Simon as Drew Pearson
- Robert Symonds as President Truman
- Andrew Duggan as President Eisenhower
- Alan Oppenheimer as Eisenhower Publicist
- Diana Douglas as Sarah
- Henry Jones as Armitage
- Tim O'Connor as Librarian
- Addison Powell as General George C. Marshall
- Andrew Prine as Peter Parker McNair Gates
- William Schallert as General Zwicker
- Murray Matheson as Publisher
- George Wyner as Roy Cohn
- Patricia Neal as Senator Margaret Chase Smith
- Howard Hesseman as Lt. Ted Cantwell

== Reception ==
John Carmody wrote in The Washington Post:

The story makes the unassailable point that McCarthy, who chased Communists around for years without every [sic] actually catching one, wouldn't have been "successful" if the media and a lot of politicians, including President Truman and Eisenhower, hadn't tolerated him.

There is a certain hand-wringing quality to some of the narration Sunday night (scriptwriters long to be on the side of the angels, too) and there is a little side-stepping when it comes to explaining the sources of McCarthy's political strengths, such as they were.

From a review by ModCinema:

Tail Gunner Joe is in its own way as biased and unfair as any of Joe McCarthy's diatribes but this made-for-TV movie works as a brisk, entertaining recollection of an era in which "guilt by association" was a byword. As Joe McCarthy, Peter Boyle's performance is so convincing that it borders on the supernatural.
