= Joseph N. Welch =

American lawyer (1890–1960)

Joseph Welch
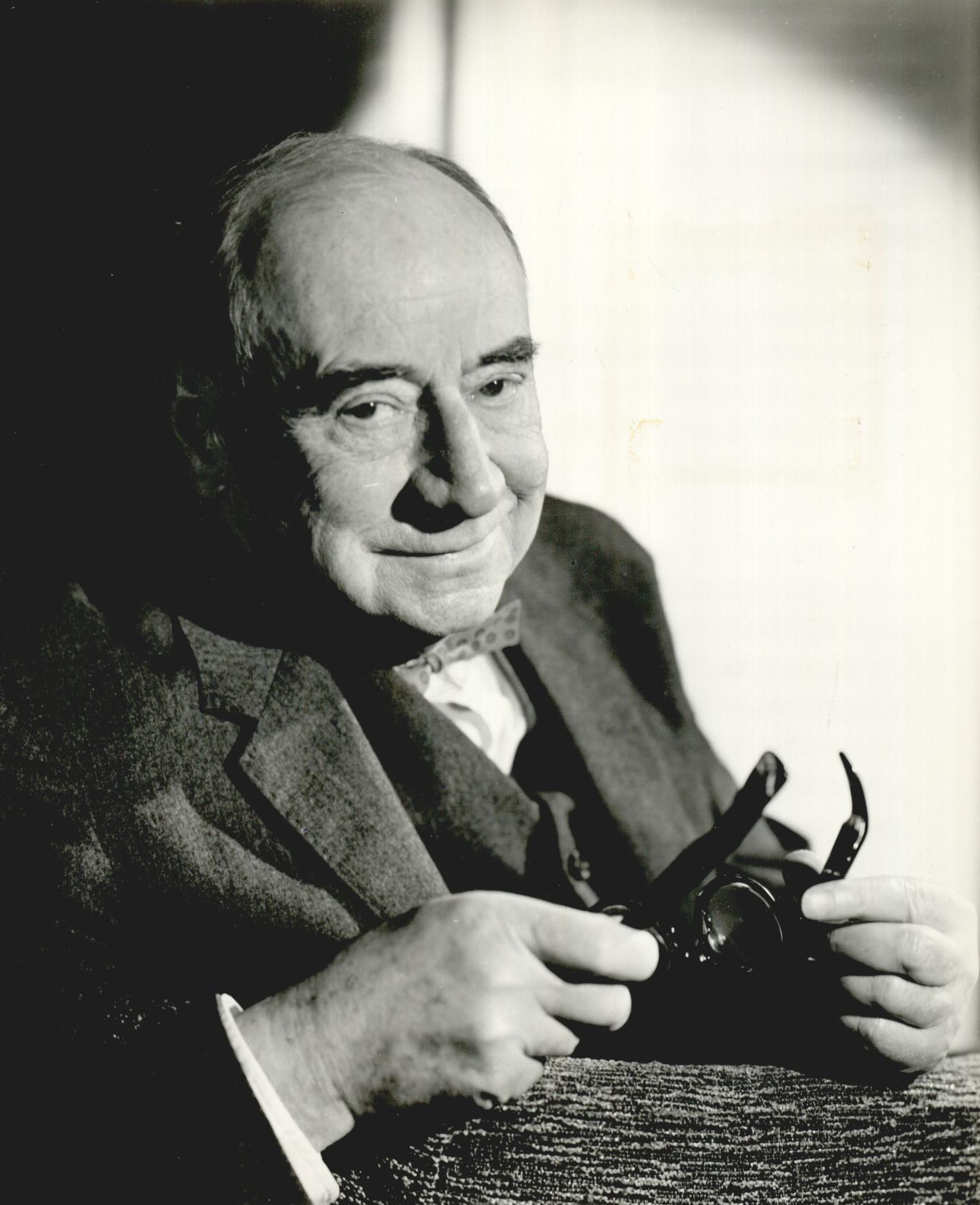
- Born: Joseph Nye Welch; October 22, 1890; Primghar, Iowa, U.S.
- Died: October 6, 1960 (aged 69); Hyannis, Massachusetts, U.S.
- Education: Grinnell College (BA); Harvard University (LLB)
- Years active: 1923–1960
- Known for: Army–McCarthy hearings
- Spouses: Judith Lyndon (m. 1917; died 1956) Agnes Rodgers Brown (m. 1957)
- Children: 2
- Relatives: Amy Landecker (great-granddaughter)

Joseph Nye Welch (October 22, 1890 – October 6, 1960) was an American lawyer who served as the chief counsel for the United States Army while it was under investigation for alleged Communist activities by Senator Joseph McCarthy's Senate Permanent Subcommittee on Investigations, an investigation known as the Army–McCarthy hearings. His confrontation with McCarthy during the hearings, in which he asked McCarthy, "Have you no sense of decency, sir, at long last?", is seen as a turning point in the history of McCarthyism.

== Early life ==
Welch was born in Primghar, Iowa, on October 22, 1890, the seventh and youngest child of English immigrants Martha (Thyer) and William Welch. He attended Grinnell College and graduated Phi Beta Kappa in 1914, then attended Harvard Law School and graduated in 1917, magna cum laude, with the second highest grade point average in his graduating class. Welch married Judith Lyndon on September 20, 1917. They had two sons, Joe and Lyndon. He enlisted in the United States Army for World War I. After joining as a private in August 1918, he applied for a commission. Welch was attending officer training school at Camp Zachary Taylor, Kentucky, when the Armistice took place. His services no longer required, Welch was discharged from the Army on November 27, 1918.

== Career ==
Beginning in 1923, Welch was a partner at Hale and Dorr, a Boston law firm, and lived in nearby Walpole, Massachusetts.

=== Army–McCarthy hearings ===
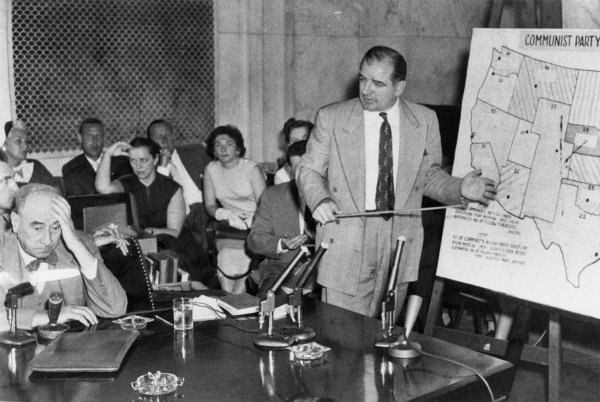
Welch (left) being questioned by Senator Joe McCarthy (right) at the Army–McCarthy hearings, June 9, 1954

On June 9, 1954, the 30th day of the Army–McCarthy hearings, Welch challenged Roy Cohn to provide U.S. Attorney General Herbert Brownell Jr. with McCarthy's list of 130 Communists or subversives in defense plants "before sundown". McCarthy stepped in and said that if Welch was so concerned about persons aiding the Communist Party, he should check on a man in his Boston law office named Fred Fisher, who had once belonged to the National Lawyers Guild, which Brownell had called "the legal mouthpiece of the Communist Party". Welch had privately discussed the matter with Fisher beforehand and the two agreed Fisher should not participate in the hearings. Welch dismissed Fisher's association with the NLG as a youthful indiscretion and attacked McCarthy for naming the young man before a nationwide television audience without prior warning or previous agreement to do so:

Until this moment, Senator, I think I have never really gauged your cruelty or your recklessness. Fred Fisher is a young man who went to the Harvard Law School and came into my firm and is starting what looks to be a brilliant career with us. ... Little did I dream you could be so reckless and so cruel as to do an injury to that lad. It is true he is still with Hale and Dorr. It is true that he will continue to be with Hale and Dorr. It is, I regret to say, equally true that I fear he shall always bear a scar needlessly inflicted by you. If it were in my power to forgive you for your reckless cruelty, I would do so. I like to think I am a gentleman, but your forgiveness will have to come from someone other than me.

When McCarthy tried to renew his attack, Welch interrupted him:

Senator, may we not drop this? We know he belonged to the Lawyers Guild ... Let us not assassinate this lad further, Senator. You've done enough. Have you no sense of decency, sir? At long last, have you left no sense of decency?

McCarthy tried to ask Welch another question about Fisher, and Welch interrupted:

Mr. McCarthy, I will not discuss this further with you. You have sat within six feet of me and could have asked me about Fred Fisher. You have seen fit to bring it out. And if there is a God in Heaven, it will do neither you nor your cause any good. I will not discuss it further. I will not ask Mr. Cohn any more questions. You, Mr. Chairman, may, if you will, call the next witness.

At this, those watching the proceedings broke into applause. Welch's TV performance turned the tide of public and press opinion against McCarthy overnight. In July, a Republican senator introduced a motion, which passed later that year, censuring McCarthy for acts that "tended to bring the Senate into dishonor and disrepute, to obstruct the constitutional processes of the Senate, and to impair its dignity."

In his review of the film Point of Order that depicted the hearings, Vincent Canby called Welch "one of the great performers ever to appear on the small screen" whether in demanding Cohn expose the security risks in the nation's defense plants or accepting a heavily insincere compliment from Cohn, in a manner which demolished Cohn.

=== Acting ===
Welch played a Michigan judge in Otto Preminger's Anatomy of a Murder (1959). He said he took the role because "it looked like that was the only way I'd ever get to be a judge." Welch actually took the part on the condition that his wife, Agnes, would be in the film. She was cast as a juror. He was nominated for a Golden Globe Award for Best Supporting Actor – Motion Picture and a BAFTA Award for Best Newcomer for the role. He also narrated the television shows Omnibus and Dow Hour of Great Mysteries.

== Personal life ==
Welch's first wife, Judith Lyndon, died on December 21, 1956, and he married Agnes Rodgers Brown in 1957. After remarrying, he moved to Harwich Port, Massachusetts, on Cape Cod, where he lived until his death.

Sixteen days before his 70th birthday, and fifteen months after the release of Anatomy of a Murder, Welch suffered a heart attack and died on October 6, 1960, at Cape Cod Hospital in Hyannis, Massachusetts.

== In popular culture ==
- In a 1959 television special sponsored by the Ford Motor Company, presenting a concert by Leonard Bernstein and the New York Philharmonic in Moscow during a tour of the Soviet Union, Welch appears in a commercial-break-replacing short film about American history showcasing Independence Hall in Philadelphia.
- In the 1977 NBC biopic Tail Gunner Joe, Welch was played by Burgess Meredith.
- In the 1992 HBO film Citizen Cohn, Welch was played by Ed Flanders.
- Welch's "Let us not assassinate this lad further, senator" passage appears as an excerpt in the R.E.M. song "Exhuming McCarthy" on their fifth studio album, Document.
- A sample of Welch's line, “Have you no sense of decency, sir?” is included in the JAY-Z song “Caught Their Eyes,” featuring Frank Ocean from the album 4:44.

== Filmography ==
Title	Year	Role	Notes
Anatomy of a Murder	1959	Judge Weaver	
