= Ellen Swepson Jackson =

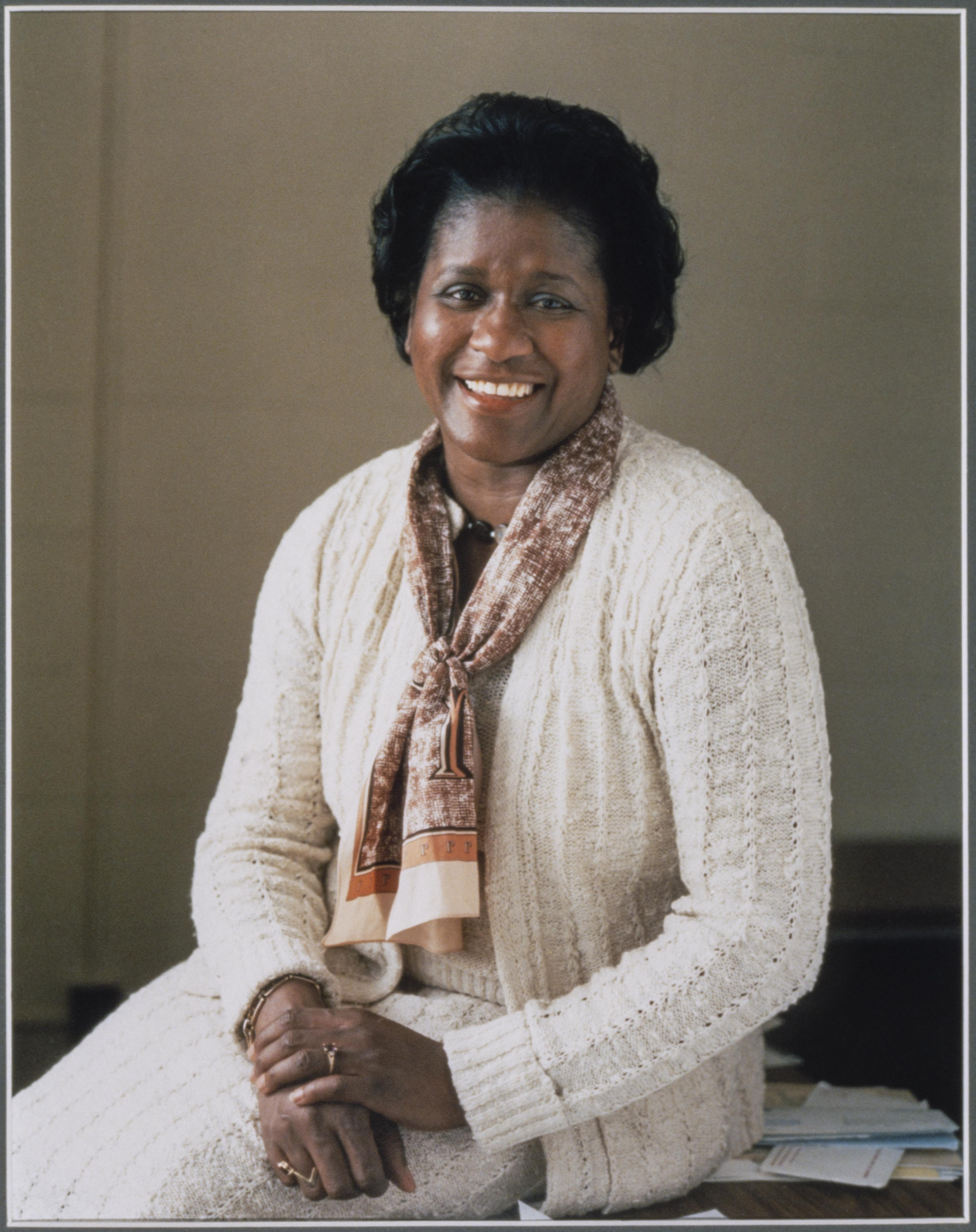
- Born: Ellen Swepson; October 29, 1935; Boston, US
- Died: November 20, 2005 (aged 70); Boston, US
- Resting place: Forest Hills Cemetery
- Education: Boston State College; Harvard University
- Occupations: Educator, activist
- Spouse: Hugo Jackson

Ellen Swepson Jackson (1935 – 2005) was an American educator and activist. She is best known for founding Operation Exodus, a program that bused students from overcrowded, predominantly black Boston schools to less crowded, predominantly white schools in the 1960s. The program paved the way for the desegregation of Boston's public schools.

== Early life and education ==
Jackson was born in Boston on October 29, 1935, the middle child of David and Marguerite Booker Swepson. She grew up in the Sugar Hill section of Roxbury and attended Girls' Latin School. As a teen she belonged to the NAACP Youth Council. She graduated from Boston State College in 1958 and received her master's degree in education from Harvard University in 1971.

In 1954, during her first year of college, she married Hugo Jackson. The couple had five children.

== Career ==
From 1962 to 1964, she served as parent coordinator for the Northern Student Movement, organizing black parents and advocating for students' equal rights. She also worked for a Boston bank at the time, and was fired in 1962 for going to a rally to hear Martin Luther King Jr. speak. She was involved in voter registration, and picketed for better representation on the board of directors of Action for Boston Community Development. She worked as a Social Service Supervisor for the Head Start program in 1964.

=== Operation Exodus ===
Jackson was a housewife with five children when she formed the Roxbury-North Dorchester Parents' Council in 1965. The neighborhood's predominantly black schools were overcrowded, and students were usually encouraged to enter vocational programs rather than prepare for college. The Parents' Council wrote letters and circulated petitions, but were unable to get the Boston School Committee to change anything. Then one day someone gave Jackson a document showing the numbers of students and seats in each classroom and school in Boston. She and other parents conceived the idea of sending students from overcrowded schools to less crowded ones, usually in white neighborhoods. They founded a program called Operation Exodus, with Jackson as executive director. From 1965 to 1969, the program transported over 1,000 students to less crowded schools.

Jackson's actions laid the groundwork for the filing of the 1972 NAACP lawsuit that led to the desegregation of Boston's public schools. At a testimonial for Jackson in 1975, U.S. district judge David S. Nelson said, "I always thought of Ellen and Operation Exodus as the beginning of it all in our community...She showed us that something could be done."

=== Later work ===
She served as national director of the Black Women's Community Development Foundation in Washington DC from 1969 to 1974. In the early years of busing in Boston, she was a member of the Citywide Coordinating Council, established by US District Judge W. Arthur Garrity Jr. to oversee the desegregation of the public schools. She also worked for the Massachusetts Department of Education as a project director for the Title IV program in the early 1970s. From 1974 to 1978, she worked with Muriel S. Snowden as director of the Freedom House Institute on Schools and Education, which offered children's educational programs and provided information on school busing. From 1978 to 1997, she served as the dean and director of affirmative action at Northeastern University.

Jackson was a delegate to several White House Conferences. In 1972 she was a delegate and member of the Democratic Platform Committee, and gave a convention speech titled "Rights, Power and Social Justice." She was involved with many charitable and civic organizations, including the Young Women's Leadership Development Program, the Legal Defense and Education Fund, the Boston Chamber of Commerce, the American Association for Higher Education, the Governor's Community Development Coordinating Council, and Boston Children's Hospital, among others.

She died of a stroke at the Beth Israel Deaconess Medical Center in Boston on November 20, 2005.

After her death, Jackson's friend and fellow activist Sarah-Ann Shaw said to a reporter, "She was a person with strong opinions, who was willing to fight for things in order to create a better society. Young people have no idea of the contributions that she and others made in that era."

== Awards and honors ==
The Ellen S. Jackson Fellowship at the Harvard Graduate School of Education was established in Jackson's honor in 1975, and a day-care center on Mission Hill was named for her in 1983. She received the Mary Hudson Onley Achievement Award in 2000, and received honorary doctorates from Northeastern University, the University of Massachusetts, Wheelock College, and Bridgewater State College. Her memoirs are included in the Black Women Oral History Project at Radcliffe College, and she is remembered in connection with Freedom House on the Boston Women's Heritage Trail.

== Publications ==
- Jackson, Ellen; Teele, James E.; Mayo, Clara A. W. (1967). Family Experiences in Operation Exodus. Behavioral Publications.
