= Jerome P. Troy =

American judge (1916–2011)

Jerome Patrick Troy

Judge of the Dorchester District Court
- In office 1962–1973

Personal details
- Born: December 21, 1916 Rockland, Massachusetts, U.S.
- Died: August 25, 2011 (aged 94) Marshfield, Massachusetts, U.S.
- Children: 1 daughter
- Education: Boston College (BA), Georgetown Law School (JD)
- Profession: Lawyer, judge

Jerome Patrick Troy (December 21, 1916 – August 25, 2011) was an American jurist who served as Judge of the Dorchester District Court from 1962 until he was removed from the bench in 1973.

== Early life ==
Troy was born on December 21, 1916, in Rockland, Massachusetts. He worked his way through school and graduated from Boston College in 1939. During World War II, he served as a combat officer in the United States Navy. After the war, he moved to Washington, D.C., where he attended Georgetown Law School and was an officer with the United States Capitol Police. After graduation, he moved to Boston, where he operated a private law practice and was a legal counsel for the Massachusetts Department of Public Health.

Troy was an unsuccessful candidate for Massachusetts Secretary of the Commonwealth in 1948, the Boston City Council in 1950, and the Boston School Committee in 1951. From 1959 to 1961, he served as First Deputy Secretary of the Commonwealth under Joseph D. Ward. In 1960, he served as chairman of Ward's unsuccessful campaign for Governor of Massachusetts.

== Judicial career ==
On December 27, 1962, Troy was appointed presiding Judge of the Dorchester District Court by Governor John Volpe four minutes before the outgoing Governor's deadline for nominations. Volpe's appointment of his previous Democratic opponent's campaign manager was seen as a move to appease the Democratic members of the Massachusetts Governor's Council, specifically Patrick J. McDonough.

=== Complaints from The People First ===
In 1971, The People First, a Dorchester community group, began a drive to remove Troy from the bench. On February 4, 1972, a judge of the United States District Court ruled that Troy's practice of ordering female welfare recipients to swear out non-support complaints against their husbands or fathers of their children was "coercive and intimidating" and denied the men due process under the 14th Amendment by putting them on trial. That same year, a three-judge panel found that Troy showed discrimination against persons involved in non-support and illegitimacy cases, held defendants in jail without bail in cases that "did not warrant this result", issued bails in a number of cases that were "clearly excessive", gave "frequently excessive" suspended sentences, failed to advise defendants of their right to counsel, failed to notify defendants of their right to obtain an immediate review of their bail order, that his court did not have a "reliable, consistent" record-keeping system, and his records contained "irregular entries...made long after the fact and for some self-serving purpose". The panel recommended that the Massachusetts Supreme Judicial Court appoint a special administrator to take over management of the Dorchester District Court but did not recommend any discipline against Troy.

=== Real estate dealings ===
In April 1973, The Boston Globe published their report of a month-long investigation into Troy's business dealings. They found that he had sat in judgment on a case involving men he had a business relationship with, assigned business associates to represent indigent defendants instead of public defenders, decided cases where one side was represented by a lawyer he had a business relationship with, and had profited from a real estate transaction by dubiously claiming non-profit status. They also found that he was a director of a New Hampshire firm led by George Kattar, a businessman who had links to Raymond L. S. Patriarca, head of the Patriarca crime family.

In 1968, Troy purchased a 23-acre parcel of land in Dorchester. He planned to construct a marina and resort hotel on the waterfront property. Soon thereafter, the Massachusetts General Court approved $178,000 for a sewer extension to the property, however public outcry led to the appropriation being canceled. His building permit required that he build an enclosure and use "earth and rock free of wood or organic material" to fill the tidewaters, but instead, he used construction debris which contained wood. He also failed to pay the fee to fill in the tidewaters. On May 1, 1970, Troy was found to have illegally filled 20 acres of wetlands with timber debris and his permit was revoked. On August 12, 1974, he was ordered to remove the landfill. On June 30, 1975, Troy was found in contempt of court for failing to remove the fill. In 1980, Troy was found by the Massachusetts Attorney General's office to not have enough money to comply with the court order and was deemed "judgment-proof". In 1982, Troy agreed to give part of the land to the Commonwealth of Massachusetts. In exchange, Troy's $44,000 fine was forgiven. The rest of the site was donated to the Commonwealth in 1985. The Massachusetts Department of Environmental Protection removed the toxic waste from the fill and the Metropolitan District Commission developed the land into a park. The park was opened to the public in 1988 as Victory Road Park.

=== Removal ===
On November 2, 1972, the Boston Bar Association filed charges against Troy based on complaints from The People First. The Massachusetts Supreme Judicial Court appointed attorneys James D. St. Clair and Raymond Young to investigate the complaints against Troy. On July 26, 1973, the Court found that Troy had lied under oath while answering questions in a lawsuit brought by an insurance company following his wife's death, pressured an attorney into making a political contribution to Francis X. Bellotti, "willfully directed the filling of Tenean Creek in an illegal manner" and subsequently lied during his testimony in a suit brought against him for the filling, had a court officer work on his marina project during court hours, and obtained free legal services from attorneys who practiced in his court. The Court ordered that Troy be disbarred and enjoined from sitting as a judge. The Massachusetts General Court approved a petition calling for Troy's removal and on November 8, 1973, the Massachusetts Governor's Council voted 7 to 1 to remove Troy from the bench, with the ninth member, Patrick J. McDonough, abstaining due to his friendship with Troy. On November 1, 1974, his disbarment was upheld by the US Court of Appeals.

== Personal life ==
Troy's first wife, College, died on July 22, 1965, at the age of 47. On February 22, 1966, he married Mary Lynn Hays. They had one daughter. In 1969, Troy and his family moved from South Boston to a 12-acre estate in Marshfield, Massachusetts. In 1980, Troy was reported to still be living on his estate in Marshfield, which had a swimming pool, tennis court, sheep, and a pony. He held no regular job but assisted his wife, who worked as a real estate agent. He took many trips to Ireland and wanted to move there, but his wife objected. Troy died on August 25, 2011, in Marshfield.
