= Army–McCarthy hearings =

1954 U.S. Senate hearings

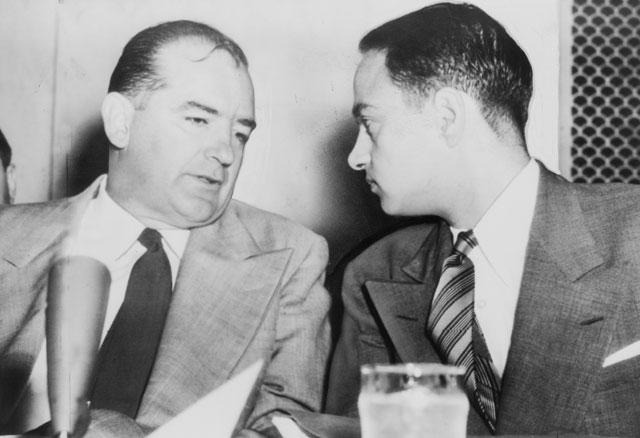
- Joseph McCarthy (left) chats with Roy Cohn at the hearings
- Event: Senate hearing probing conduct of Senator Joseph McCarthy and his chief counsel Roy Cohn
- Time: April–June 1954
- Place: Washington, D.C.
- Participants: U.S. Army, including Army Secretary Robert T. Stevens and counsel Joseph N. Welch; Joseph McCarthy, Roy Cohn, G. David Schine
- Chairman: Senator Karl Mundt
- Result: Contributed to end of McCarthy's career

The Army–McCarthy hearings were a series of televised hearings held by the United States Senate's Subcommittee on Investigations (April–June 1954) to investigate conflicting accusations between the United States Army and Senator Joseph McCarthy of Wisconsin. The Army accused McCarthy and his chief counsel Roy Cohn of pressuring the Army to give preferential treatment to G. David Schine, a former McCarthy aide and friend of Cohn's. McCarthy counter-charged that this accusation was made in bad faith and in retaliation for his recent aggressive investigations of suspected communists and security risks in the Army.

Chaired by Senator Karl Mundt, the hearings convened on March 16, 1954, and received considerable press attention, including gavel-to-gavel live television coverage on ABC and DuMont (April 22 – June 17). A confrontation between McCarthy and Army counsel Joseph N. Welch was one of the highlights of the hearing.

The committee report exonerated McCarthy from direct involvement in the pressure campaign, but criticized him and Cohn. It chided Army Secretary Robert T. Stevens but rejected McCarthy's counter-charges. Media reports on the hearing, particularly live television coverage, greatly contributed to McCarthy's decline in popularity and his censure by the Senate the following December.

== Background ==
McCarthy came to national prominence in February 1950 after giving a speech in Wheeling, West Virginia, in which he claimed to have a list of 205 State Department employees who were members of the Communist Party. McCarthy claimed the list was provided to but dismissed by Secretary of State Dean Acheson, saying that the "State Department harbors a nest of Communists and Communist sympathizers who are helping to shape our foreign policy". In January 1953, McCarthy began his second term and the Republican Party regained control of the Senate; with the Republicans in the majority, McCarthy was made chairman of the Senate Committee on Government Operations. This committee included the Permanent Subcommittee on Investigations, and the mandate of this subcommittee allowed McCarthy to use it to carry out his investigations of communists in the government. McCarthy appointed 26-year-old Roy Cohn as chief counsel to the subcommittee and future attorney general Robert F. Kennedy as assistant counsel, while reassigning Francis Flanagan to the ad hoc position of general counsel.

In 1953, McCarthy's committee began inquiries into the United States Army, starting by investigating supposed communist infiltration of the Army Signal Corps laboratory at Fort Monmouth. McCarthy's investigations were largely fruitless, but after the Army accused McCarthy and his staff of seeking a direct commission for Private G. David Schine, a chief consultant to the Senate Permanent Subcommittee on Investigations and a close friend of Cohn's who had been drafted into the Army as a private the previous year, McCarthy claimed that the accusation was made in bad faith in retaliation for the Fort Monmouth probe. The accusations were made on March 11, 1954, two days after Edward R. Murrow's critical report on McCarthy was broadcast in the CBS News program See It Now.

== The hearings ==
The Senate decided that these conflicting charges should be investigated and the appropriate committee to do this was the Senate Permanent Subcommittee on Investigations, chaired by McCarthy. Since McCarthy was one of the targets of the hearings, Senator Karl Mundt was appointed to assume his responsibilities as chairman of the subcommittee. John G. Adams served as the Army's counsel for the hearing. Acting as special counsel was Joseph Welch of the Boston law firm of Hale & Dorr (now called WilmerHale).

=== National broadcasts ===
CBS chose not to broadcast the hearings and NBC carried only two days of the proceedings. ABC. The hearings were broadcast nationally, in full, on the new ABC and DuMont networks. Francis Newton Littlejohn, the news director at ABC, made the decision to cover the hearings live, gavel-to-gavel.

A New York Times article observed in 1998 that the "full hearings were carried by ABC, a network then so weak that it had no daytime schedule to pre-empt. This gamble proved to be a brilliant coup. Public response was enormous. As the hearings built to a climax in June, CBS and NBC affiliates dumped their afternoon soaps to pick up the ABC feed while the Gallup Poll reported that an astounding 89 percent of adult Americans were following the show."

The televised hearings lasted for 36 days and an estimated 80 million people saw at least part of the hearings. Some segments of the hearings were viewed by as many as 20 million people.

The live television influenced the tenor of the proceedings. McCarthy made references to the television audience being ''the jury in this case."

=== Photograph ===
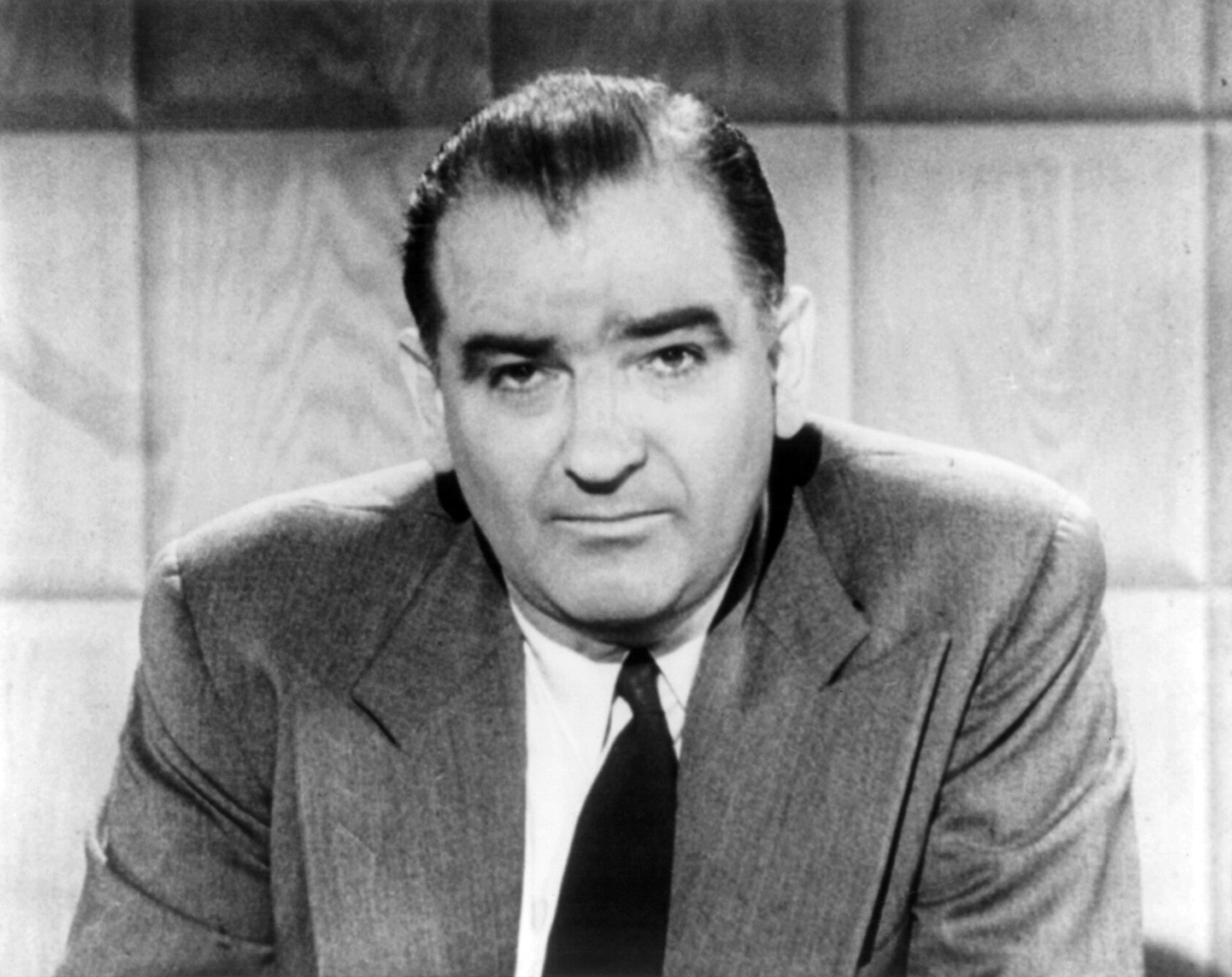
Senator Joseph McCarthy of Wisconsin

While the hearings went on, a photograph of Schine was introduced, and Welch accused Cohn of doctoring the image to show Schine alone with Army Secretary Robert T. Stevens. On the witness stand, Cohn and Schine both insisted that the picture entered into evidence (Schine and Stevens alone) was requested by Stevens and that no one was edited out of the photograph. Welch then produced a wider shot of Stevens and Schine with McGuire AFB wing commander Colonel Jack Bradley standing to Schine's right. A fourth person also edited out of the picture (his sleeve was visible to Bradley's right in the Welch photograph) was identified as McCarthy aide Frank Carr.

=== Hoover memo ===
After the photograph was discredited, McCarthy produced a copy of a confidential letter he claimed was a January 26, 1951, memo written and sent by FBI Director J. Edgar Hoover, to Major General Alexander R. Bolling, warning Army intelligence of subversives in the Army Signal Corps. McCarthy claimed the letter was in the Army files when Stevens became secretary in 1953, and that Stevens willfully ignored it. Welch was the first to question the letter's validity, claiming that McCarthy's "purported copy" did not come from Army files; McCarthy stated he never received any document from the FBI, but when questioned on the stand by special Senate counsel Ray Jenkins and cross-examined by Welch, McCarthy, while admitting the document was given to him by an intelligence officer, refused to identify his source.

Robert Collier, assistant to Ray Jenkins, read a letter from Attorney General Herbert Brownell Jr., in which he stated that Hoover examined the document and that he neither wrote nor ordered the letter, and that no such copy existed in official FBI records, rendering McCarthy's claims meritless, and the letter spurious.

=== Homosexuality ===
Though the hearings were sometimes about government subversion, they occasionally took on accusations of a more taboo nature: a portion of the hearings assessed the security risk of homosexuals in government. The issue remained an undercurrent throughout the hearings. One such example of this undercurrent was an exchange between Senator McCarthy and Welch. Welch was questioning McCarthy staff member James Juliana about the unedited picture of Schine with Stevens and Bradley, asking him "Did you think this came from a Pixie?" (an inexpensive amateur camera), at which point McCarthy asked to have the question re-read:

McCarthy. Will counsel [Welch] for my benefit define – I think he might be an expert on that – what a pixie is?
Welch. Yes. I should say, Mr. Senator, that a pixie is a close relative of a fairy. (Laughter from the chamber) Shall I proceed, sir? Have I enlightened you?
McCarthy. As I said, I think you may be an authority on what a pixie is.

Welch's response compared the mythological pixie and fairy as well as using "fairy" as a derogatory term for a homosexual male.

==== Cohn, Schine and McCarthy ====
At least a portion of the Army's allegations were correct. Cohn did take steps to request preferential treatment for Schine, going so far on at least one occasion to sign McCarthy's name without his knowledge on a request for Schine to have access to the Senators' baths, a pool and steam room reserved exclusively for senators.

The exact relationship between Cohn, McCarthy and Schine remains unknown. Cohn and Schine were certainly close, and rather than work out of the Senate offices, the two rented nearby office space and shared bills. McCarthy commented that Cohn was unreasonable in matters dealing with Schine. It is unclear if Schine ever had a romantic or sexual relationship with Cohn, who was a closeted homosexual. Three years after the hearings, Schine married and eventually had six children. Some have also suggested that McCarthy may have been homosexual, and was even possibly involved with Schine or Cohn.

== Joseph N. Welch confronts McCarthy ==
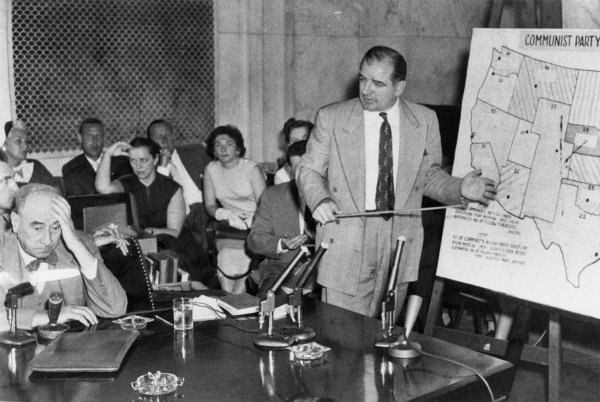
Joseph N. Welch (left) being questioned by Senator Joseph McCarthy (right), June 9, 1954

In what played out to be the most dramatic exchange of the hearings, McCarthy responded to aggressive questioning from Army counsel Joseph N. Welch. On June 9, 1954, day 30 of the hearings, Welch challenged Cohn to give McCarthy's list of 130 subversives in defense plants to the office of the FBI and the Department of Defense "before the sun goes down". In response to Welch's badgering of Cohn, McCarthy suggested that Welch should "check" on Fred Fisher, a young lawyer in Welch's own Boston law firm whom Welch had planned to have on his staff for the hearings. Fisher had once belonged to the National Lawyers Guild (NLG), a group which Attorney General Brownell had called "the legal bulwark of the Communist Party". McCarthy had previously agreed to keep Fisher's involvement in both Welch's law firm and the NLG confidential. In exchange, Welch agreed to leave a controversy regarding Cohn's draft status out of the hearings.

Welch revealed he had confirmed Fisher's former membership in the National Lawyers Guild approximately six weeks before the hearings started. After Fisher admitted his membership in the National Lawyers Guild, Welch decided to send Fisher back to Boston. His replacement by another colleague on Welch's staff was also covered by The New York Times. Welch then reprimanded McCarthy for his needless attack on Fisher, saying "Until this moment, Senator, I think I never really gauged your cruelty or your recklessness." McCarthy, accusing Welch of filibustering the hearing and baiting Cohn, resumed his attack on Fisher, at which point Welch angrily cut him short:

Senator, may we not drop this? We know he belonged to the Lawyers Guild ... Let us not assassinate this lad further, Senator; you've done enough. Have you no sense of decency, sir? At long last, have you left no sense of decency?

Welch excluded himself from the remainder of the hearings with a parting shot to McCarthy: "Mr. McCarthy, I will not discuss this further with you ... You have seen fit to bring [the Fisher/NLG affair] out, and if there is a God in heaven, it will do neither you nor your cause any good! I will not discuss it further ... You, Mr. Chairman, may as you will, call the next witness!" After Welch deferred to Chairman Mundt to call the next witness, the gallery burst into applause.

After viewing the documentary Point of Order in the 1960s, the critic Dwight Macdonald suggested that Welch's famous condemnation of McCarthy "seemed to be a spontaneous cry of moral indignation -- 'seemed' because on this viewing, at least, I thought I detected a calculated artistry in Welch's performance."

=== Confrontation with Symington ===
Near the end of the hearings, McCarthy and Senator Stuart Symington sparred over the handling of secret files by McCarthy's staff. McCarthy staff director Frank Carr testified that everyone who worked on McCarthy's staff had access to classified files regardless of their level of security clearance. Symington hinted that some members of McCarthy's own staff might themselves be subversive and signed a document agreeing to take the stand in the hearings to reveal their names in return for McCarthy's signature on the same document agreeing to an investigation of his staff. But McCarthy, after calling Symington "Sanctimonious Stu", refused to sign the agreement, claiming it contained false statements, and called the accusations an "unfounded smear" on his men. He then rebuked Symington by saying "You're not fooling anyone!" Symington responded, "Senator, the American people have had a look at you now for six weeks; you're not fooling anyone, either."

== Committee reports ==
After 36 days of hearings, the Republican majority and Democratic minority of the committee issued separate reports on August 31. The majority report signed was signed by Republican committee members Mundt, Everett Dirksen, Charles E. Potter and Henry C. Dworshak. It concluded that McCarthy himself had not exercised any improper influence on Schine's behalf, but that he had allowed Roy Cohn and perhaps others to "make things uncomfortable for the Army" if it did not give Schine special privileges, and that Cohn had engaged in some "unduly aggressive and persistent" on behalf of Schine. The majority report found that McCarthy appeared to have known about the efforts being conducted for Schine and to have condoned them, and that he should have made vigorous efforts to prevent them from happening.

The majority found that Cohn "consumed an inordinate amount of committee time" helping Schine, but that the Fort Monmouth investigation was not conducted as part of that effort. It found questionable behavior on the part of the Army. Its report found that Stevens and Army Counsel John Adams "made efforts to terminate or influence the investigation and hearings at Fort Monmouth", and that Adams "made vigorous and diligent efforts" to block subpoenas for members of the Army Loyalty and Screening Board "by means of personal appeal to certain members of the [McCarthy] committee". The majority rejected McCarthy's counter-charge of bad faith. It said that while his motives were "above reproach," he "followed a course of placation, appeasement and vacillation," and should have reported improper conduct to the committee and "terminated such contacts through administrative action."

The minority report was signed by Democratic committee members McClellan, Symington and Henry Jackson. It found that McCarthy "fully acquiesced in and condoned" Cohn's actions, and said that both he and Cohn "merit severe criticism." The minority report also rebuked Stevens and said that he demonstrated "an inexcusable indecisiveness."

== Aftermath and censure ==
In Gallup polls from January 1954, McCarthy's approval rating was at 50%, with only 29% disapproving. By June, both percentages had shifted by 16%, with more people (34% approving, 45% disapproving) now rejecting McCarthy and his methods.

Before the official reports were released, Cohn had resigned as McCarthy's chief counsel, and Senator Ralph Flanders (R-Vermont) had introduced a resolution of censure against McCarthy in the Senate.

Despite McCarthy's acquittal of misconduct in the Schine matter, the Army–McCarthy hearings ultimately became the main catalyst in McCarthy's downfall from political power. Daily newspaper summaries were increasingly unfavorable toward McCarthy, while television audiences witnessed firsthand McCarthy's conduct.

On December 2, 1954, the Senate voted 67–22 to censure McCarthy, effectively eradicating his influence, though not expelling him from office. McCarthy continued to chair the Subcommittee on Investigations until January 3, 1955, the day the 84th United States Congress was inaugurated; Senator John L. McClellan (D-Arkansas) replaced McCarthy as chairman.

Fred Fisher was relatively unaffected by McCarthy's charges and went on to become a partner in Boston's prestigious Hale & Dorr law firm and organized its commercial law department. He also served as president of the Massachusetts Bar Association and as chairman of many committees of the American and Boston bar associations.

After his censuring, Senator McCarthy continued his anti-communist oratory, often speaking to an empty or near-empty Senate chamber. Turning increasingly to alcohol, McCarthy died of hepatitis on May 2, 1957, at the age of 48.

== Legacy ==
Writing in the New York Times in 1998 on the re-release of Point of Order, writer J. Hoberman observed that "While televised hearings had made a national figure of Senator Estes Kefauver in 1951, the same format destroyed McCarthy." The hearings pointed up the adverse nature McCarthy's personality, the sepulchral urgency and a mirthless laugh that proved perversely untelegenic."

Hoberman observed that even though "the subsequent subcommittee report was ambiguous, the Wisconsin Senator's hold was broken".

== See also ==
- House Un-American Activities Committee
- McCarthyism
- Point of Order!
- United States Senate Subcommittee on Internal Security
