= James D. Zirin =

New York lawyer, author

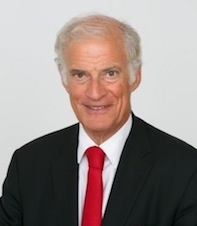
- Born: January 10, 1940 (age 86); New York City
- Occupations: Attorney, author
- Website: jimzirin.com

James David Zirin (born January 10, 1940) is an American lawyer, author, and television talk-show host.

== Early life and education ==
James David Zirin was born in New York City to Morris Zirin, a lawyer and author, and Kate (née Sapir) Zirin. He graduated from Princeton University in 1961 and the University of Michigan Law School, where he was an editor of the Michigan Law Review.

== Career ==
=== Government and law work ===
Zirin was an Assistant United States Attorney for three years in Manhattan. He served in the criminal division under Robert M. Morgenthau. Zirin was a partner in the law firm of Breed, Abbott & Morgan in New York before he joined Sidley Austin, a firm focused on transactional and litigation matters, in 1993. In 2003, Mayor Michael R. Bloomberg appointed Zirin to the New York City Commission to Combat Police Corruption. He is a Fellow of the American College of Trial Lawyers, and the past chair of its International Law Committee. He is a current trustee of the Asia Society, and a member of the Council on Foreign Relations.

=== Author and TV host ===
Zirin is the author of three books, and has written op-ed pieces for publications on legal, political, and foreign policy subjects. His essays have appeared in Forbes, Time, Huffington Post, The Hill, The Nation, New York Daily News, The Washington Post, and Washington Monthly. Zirin hosts Conversations with Jim Zirin, a PBS-syndicated television program. Zirin was interviewed in Where's My Roy Cohn? (2019), a documentary film about American lawyer Roy Cohn directed by Matt Tyrnauer.

== Philanthropy ==
Zirin and his wife, Marlene Hess Zirin, donated money toward construction of the Marlene Hess and James D. Zirin Lounge at the Museum of Modern Art (MOMA) in Midtown Manhattan. He is a member of the Consolidated Corporate Fund Leadership Committee of the Lincoln Center for the Performing Arts.

== Personal life ==
In 1990, Zirin married Marlene Hess, daughter of businessman and former New York Jets owner Leon Hess.

== Works ==
- Zirin, James (2014). The mother court : tales of cases that mattered in America's greatest trial court. Chicago, Illinois: American Bar Association. ISBN 978-1-62722-322-5.
- Supremely Partisan (2016) argues that the Supreme Court of the United States is heavily influenced by politics
- Plaintiff in Chief: A Portrait of Donald Trump in 3,500 Lawsuits (2019) regarding President Trump's use of the justice system

=== The Mother Court ===
James D. Zirin
- Author: James D. Zirin
- Genre: Non-fiction
- Publisher: American Bar Association
- Publication date: July 1, 2014
- Publication place: United States
- Media type: Print (hardcover)
- Pages: 322
- ISBN: 978-1627223225

The Mother Court: Tales of Cases That Mattered in America's Greatest Trial Court is a non-fiction book by Zirin that was published by the American Bar Association in 2014. The book contains a series of anecdotes about trials, courts, and judges within the United States District Court for the Southern District of New York. The nickname for this court system is "The Mother Court". The stories and anecdotes are focused on landmark decisions that helped to shape America's laws. It was followed two years later by Zirin's second book, Supremely Partisan.

The book received mixed reviews. Mandy Twaddell with The Providence Journal stated, "[this book] bolsters confidence in our court system." David J. Dickson in The Journal: of the Law Society of Scotland called it a "...readable and revealing book..."

=== Supremely Partisan ===
James D. Zirin
- Author: James D. Zirin
- Publisher: Rowman & Littlefield
- Publication date: September 15, 2016
- Publication place: United States
- Media type: Print, Ebook
- Pages: 312
- ISBN: 978-1-4422-6636-0 (Hardcover)

Supremely Partisan: How Raw Politics Tips the Scales in the United States Supreme Court is a non-fiction book by Zirin published by Rowman & Littlefield on September 15, 2016. The book was published two years after The Mother Court. In the book, Zirin argues that the Supreme Court has become dangerously partisan. According to Supreme Court correspondent Dahlia Lithwick, Zirin argues persuasively that "the [2016] court is as dangerously partisan as it can be, asserting that it is 'a court of law in many cases, and a political court in many others, with 5–4 decisions laced with ideology, a partisan divide, and diminished public confidence in the court’s legitimacy as the final interpreter of the law of the land'."

Liane Jackson from the ABA Journal wrote, "Zirin’s book is particularly timely and thought-provoking, whether or not you agree with his premise." Spectator political columnist Michael Beloff opines, "...[Zirin] uses skills developed both from behind the bar and in front of the camera to mount the charge that the US Supreme Court is a political court."

=== Plaintiff in Chief ===
Plaintiff in Chief: A Portrait of Donald Trump in 3,500 Lawsuits
- Author: James D. Zirin
- Language: English
- Genre: Politics
- Published: September 24, 2019
- Publisher: All Points Books
- Publication place: United States
- Pages: 336
- ISBN: 9781250201621

Published in September 2019, Zirin's third book Plaintiff in Chief: A Portrait of Donald Trump in 3,500 Lawsuits focuses on lawsuits involving Donald Trump and his real estate development projects, allegations of sexual misconduct, and the Mueller Special Counsel investigation, among others. The study is based on three years of research and spans 45 years of Trump's career and personal life. Specific cases include one brought by the U.S. government for housing discrimination in 1973, another involving unpaid undocumented workers, a class action related to Trump University, and a defamation suit filed by Trump against an employee of The New York Times. Zirin also describes Roy Cohn's influence on Trump, including the former U.S. president's understanding and application of the law. Lee Rawles of ABA Journal included the book in a list of the top 10 stories of 2020.
