= Studio 54 (film) =

2018 documentary by Matt Tyrnauer

- Promotional poster
- Directed by: Matt Tyrnauer
- Produced by: Matt Tyrnauer; John Battsek; Corey Reeser
- Starring: Ian Schrager; Steve Rubell
- Cinematography: Tom Hurwitz
- Music by: Lorne Balfe
- Release date: October 5, 2018
- Country: United States
- Language: English

Studio 54 is a 2018 American documentary film directed by Matt Tyrnauer, examining the meteoric history of the Studio 54 nightclub, an extravagant disco venue infamous for hedonistic excess. Those responsible for the club's wild success reflect on the scene they sparked in 1977. Discotheque co-owner Ian Schrager recounts his role at the center of it all, including the club's fraudulent accounting and legal consequences.

== Overview ==
Steve Rubell and Ian Schrager opened the Studio 54 nightclub on April 26, 1977, revolutionizing New York City nightlife. The club's third owner and silent partner Jack Dushey also shares his reflections. Vintage footage and photographs show the club's heyday in the late 1970s, highlighting its zeitgeist of freedom and escapism, notorious for widespread drug use and sexual promiscuity.

Interviews recount details of the club's design, production, and promotion. The nightclub repurposed the building's theatrical and broadcasting features to elaborate effect, with immersive dancefloor lighting and a cast staging thematic party spectacles. Frequented by many celebrity guests, the club's constant stream of media attention brought throngs of hopefuls to wait outside. Those lucky enough to pass through the velvet ropes were transported into a liberated adult fantasy, dancing among the likes of Halston, Liza Minnelli, Bianca Jagger, and Andy Warhol.

Studio 54 faced multiple government raids and became entangled in numerous legal battles, with attorney Roy Cohn defending Rubell and Schrager on drug allegations and charges of tax evasion. Public scandal surrounding White House Chief of Staff Hamilton Jordan added to the club's infamy. Rubell and Schrager threw a farewell party before serving time in prison. After their 1981 release, the two men made a comeback in the hospitality industry. Many club staffers, including Rubell, later died in the AIDS epidemic.

== Critical reception ==
On the review aggregator website Rotten Tomatoes, the film has an approval rating of 90%, based on 84 reviews, with an average rating of 7.3/10. The website's consensus reads, "Studio 54 offers audiences an engrossing close-up look at an emblem of a decade's decadence – as well as its sobering aftermath."

The New York Times wrote, "The movie is a fast account that is sometimes a tad facile in its analysis of a cultural moment. But as Mr. Schrager's personal too-much-too-soon story, it's compelling."

Film Threat praised the documentary as a piece of a cultural history that "paints a picture of an era of New York that had a significant effect on the world. And it goes without saying, changed the nightclub industry forever."
