= Mother Court =

Mother Court may refer to:

- United States District Court for the Southern District of New York, nickname
- The Mother Court, a book about the S.D.N.Y. court
