= Wheel of time (disambiguation) =

The wheel of time or the wheel of history is a religious concept regarding the cyclical nature of time, predominant in Buddhism and Hinduism.

It may also refer to:

== Books and derived works ==
- The Wheel of Time, a series of fantasy novels begun by Robert Jordan in 1990
  - The Wheel of Time Collectible Card Game, based on the Jordan series
  - The Wheel of Time Roleplaying Game, based on the Jordan series
  - The Wheel of Time (video game), a first-person shooter based on the Jordan series
  - The Wheel of Time (TV series), a 2021 adaptation based on the novel series
  - The Wheel of Time (TV series) soundtracks, various albums released between 2021 and 2023
- Dragon Knight: The Wheel of Time, a 1998 anime OVA adaptation of Dragon Knight 4.

== Other uses ==
- Wheel of Time (film), a 2003 documentary directed by Werner Herzog
- The Wheel of Time (album), a 2002 release by Sandra
- "Wheel of Time", a 2010 song from the Blind Guardian album At the Edge of Time

== See also ==
- Kalachakra, wheel of time in Tibetan Buddhism
- Timewheel, a huge hourglass located in Budapest, Hungary
- Wheel of the Year, annual cycle of seasonal festivals observed by neopagans
