= Murder in the Air (film) =

- Theatrical release poster
- Directed by: Lewis Seiler
- Screenplay by: Raymond L. Schrock
- Produced by: Bryan Foy
- Starring: Ronald Reagan; John Litel; Lya Lys; James Stephenson; Eddie Foy, Jr. Robert Warwick; Victor Zimmerman
- Cinematography: Ted D. McCord
- Edited by: Frank Magee
- Music by: William Lava
- Production company: First National Pictures
- Distributed by: Warner Bros. Pictures
- Release date: June 1, 1940
- Running time: 55 minutes
- Country: United States
- Language: English

Murder in the Air (aka The Enemy Within) is a 1940 American drama film with science fiction elements directed by Lewis Seiler and written by Raymond L. Schrock. The film stars Ronald Reagan, John Litel, Lya Lys, James Stephenson, Eddie Foy, Jr., Robert Warwick and Victor Zimmerman. Murder in the Air was released by Warner Bros. Pictures on June 1, 1940.

== Plot ==
Agent Saxby (John Litel), the head of the Secret Service in the U.S. Treasury Department, assigns agent Lieutenant "Brass" Bancroft (Ronald Reagan) to impersonate deceased spy Steve Swenko. Gabby Watters (Eddie Foy, Jr.), Brass's assistant, finds a letter in the dead spy's shoe, addressed to Joe Garvey (James Stephenson), the leader of a group being investigated by the House Un-American Activities Committee.

Swenko's wife, Hilda Riker (Lya Lys) finds out her husband is dead and recognizes Bancroft as an imposter. Before she can alert Garvey that there is a federal agent about, Gabby, posing as a taxi driver, follows Brass to Hilda's apartment and comes to his rescue.

An unwitting Garvey assigns Bancroft to board the U.S. Navy dirigible USS Mason, which carries the newly invented "Inertia Projector", a sort of death-ray that can shut off an engine. Once aboard, Bancroft is to contact Garvey's henchman Rumford (Victor Zimmerman). Rumford is posing as an assistant to Dr. Finchley (Robert Warwick), a scientist working for the League of Nations, who invented the projector.

While he steals the plans for the inertia projector, Rumford orders Bancroft to destroy the dirigible, but Garvey and Rumford learn Bancroft is a government agent. When the dirigible crashes during a storm, Rumford takes the plans and leaves the unconscious Bancroft to die in the crash.

Brass is rescued and taken to a Navy hospital. Garvey tries to fly to Mexico with Rumford and the stolen documents. Brass alerts Saxby to Garvey's plan. In a spectacular air chase, the agents catch Garvey's aircraft. They bring it down with the inertia projector, sending both spies to their death in a burst of flames.

== Cast ==
- Ronald Reagan as "Brass" Bancroft/ Steve Swenko
- John Litel as Saxby
- Lya Lys as Hilda Riker
- James Stephenson as Joe Garvey
- Eddie Foy, Jr. as Gabby Watters
- Robert Warwick as Doctor Finchley
- Victor Zimmerman as Rumford
- William Gould as Admiral Winfield
- Kenneth Harlan as Commander Wayne
- Frank Wilcox as Hotel Clerk
- Owen King as George Hayden
- Dick Rich as John Kramer
- Charles Brokaw as Otto
- Helen Lynd as Dolly

== Aircraft appearing ==
- Douglas DC-2
- Douglas DC-3
- Boeing 247 c/n 1736, NC13354
- Travel Air 6000
- Stearman C3R
- Buhl Airsedan (Note: The scenes of the dirigible is the German Zeppelin Hindenburg filmed in flight in the United States and on the ground, at Lakehurst, New Jersey in 1936-1937.)

== Reception ==
Film reviewer Bosley Crowther, in his review for The New York Times, enjoyed 'Murder in the Air', "Ronald Reagan and the Warners' FBI agents have the situation well in hand. After some sixty minutes of highly incredible melodramatic incident, the government's prized 'inertia projector' is rescued from foreign hands and the saboteurs are either killed off or jailed. (The 'inertia projector' is an instrument which fouls electric current at the source; its amazing practicality is illustrated when it is focused on the plane in which the enemy agents attempt to flee the country.) Mr. Reagan, who had seen service previously with the Warners' FBI force, handles his role of counter-espionage agent with the customary daring. Eddie Foy Jr. has a few good comical moments, and Lya Lys of the golden tresses makes an attractive Mata Hari. The screen play by Raymond Schrock is compact, if not 'original', and the direction by Lewis Seiler is swiftly paced. All of which tends to make 'Murder in the Air' acceptable program fare."

Aviation film historian James H, Farmer in Celluloid Wings: The Impact of Movies on Aviation (1984), described Murder in the Air as, "... an action-packed thriller."

== Legacy ==
Footage from the film is used in the 2020 documentary The Reagans to illustrate President Reagan's support for the Star Wars defense program, which conceptualized the capabilities of a similar device from the film. Clips were also used in the 2003 miniseries The Reagans.
