= Albert C. Cohn =

American judge (1885–1959)

- Born: December 20, 1885; New York City, U.S.
- Died: January 8, 1959 (aged 73); New York City, U.S.
- Employer: New York State Supreme Court
- Political party: Democratic Party
- Spouse: Dora Marcus (1892–1967) (m. 1924)
- Children: Roy Cohn

Albert C. Cohn (December 20, 1885 – January 8, 1959) was a New York State Supreme Court Justice and the father of Roy Cohn. He was influential in Democratic Party politics.

== Biography ==
Cohn was born and raised in New York; married Dora (née Marcus; 1892–1967) in 1924, when he was the First Assistant District Attorney for Bronx County. Their only son, renowned attorney Roy Cohn, was born in 1927. Cohn was inducted as a justice of the New York Supreme Court into Part III of Bronx Supreme Court in April 1929. A 1931 decision by Cohn stripped control of amateur boxing in New York from the Amateur Athletic Union (AAU) and placed it under control of the New York State Athletic Commission. In April 1937, Governor Herbert H. Lehman promoted Cohn to a five-year term on the New York Supreme Court, Appellate Division, where his fellow Justices included Irwin Untermyer.

He spearheaded a program for accreditation by the American Bar Association for his alma mater, New York Law School, starting in 1947, which was successful, in 1954. He died on January 8, 1959, in New York City.
