= Clear All Wires! =

1933 film

- Directed by: George Hill
- Screenplay by: Delmer Daves
- Based on: From the stage play written by Bella and Samuel Spewack and produced by Herman Shumlin
- Produced by: George Hill
- Starring: Lee Tracy; Benita Hume; Una Merkel; James Gleason
- Cinematography: Norbert Brodine
- Edited by: Hugh Wynn
- Music by: William Axt
- Production companies: Metro-Goldwyn-Mayer; A George Hill Production
- Distributed by: Metro-Goldwyn-Mayer
- Release date: February 24, 1933
- Running time: 78 minutes
- Country: United States
- Language: English

Clear All Wires! is a 1933 American pre-Code comedy film directed by George Hill and written by Bella and Samuel Spewack (from their 1932 play of the same name) and Delmer Daves. The film stars Lee Tracy, Benita Hume, Una Merkel, James Gleason, Alan Edwards and Eugene Sigaloff. The film was released on February 24, 1933, by Metro-Goldwyn-Mayer.

== Cast ==
- Lee Tracy as Buckley Joyce Thomas
- Benita Hume as Kate
- Una Merkel as Dolly
- James Gleason as Lefty
- Alan Edwards as Pettingwaite
- Eugene Sigaloff as Prince Alexander
- Ari Kutai as Kostya
- C. Henry Gordon as Commissar
- Lya Lys as Eugenie
- John Melvin Bleifer as Sozanoff
- Lawrence Grant as MacKenzie
