= The Return of Doctor X =

1939 film

- Theatrical release poster
- Directed by: Vincent Sherman
- Screenplay by: Lee Katz
- Based on: The Doctor's Secret; 1938 story in Detective Fiction Weekly by William J. Makin
- Produced by: Bryan Foy; Hal B. Wallis (uncredited executive producer); Jack L. Warner (executive producer)
- Starring: Wayne Morris; Rosemary Lane; Humphrey Bogart
- Cinematography: Sidney Hickox
- Edited by: Thomas Pratt
- Music by: Bernhard Kaun
- Color process: Black and white
- Production company: Warner Bros. Pictures
- Distributed by: Warner Bros. Pictures
- Release date: December 2, 1939
- Running time: 62 minutes
- Country: United States
- Language: English

The Return of Doctor X (also billed as The Return of Dr. X) is a 1939 American science fiction-horror film directed by Vincent Sherman and starring Wayne Morris, Rosemary Lane, and Humphrey Bogart as the title character. It was based on the short story "The Doctor's Secret" by William J. Makin. Despite supposedly being a sequel to Doctor X (1932), also produced by Warner Bros. Pictures, the films are unrelated.

This was Bogart's only science fiction or horror film.

== Plot summary ==
A pair of bizarre murders occur wherein the victims are drained of their rare Type One blood type. Reporter Walter Garrett consults with his friend Dr. Mike Rhodes which leads them to Rhodes' former mentor, hematologist Dr. Francis Flegg. Flegg is initially unhelpful, but Garrett and Rhodes notice a striking resemblance between Flegg's strange assistant Marshall Quesne and the late Dr. Maurice Xavier in old press cuttings. After opening Xavier's grave and finding it empty, they confront Flegg. Flegg admits using his new scientific methods to bring Xavier back from the dead and has employed synthetic blood to sustain his life. However, the blood cannot replace itself and therefore Quesne/Xavier must seek out human victims with the rare Type One blood type contained in the formula in order to stay alive.

A hunt begins for Quesne, who has discovered that Joan Vance, a nurse and Rhodes' sweetheart, is a carrier of the rare blood type. He escapes with her in a taxi, professing to be taking her to Rhodes. Barnett and Rhodes, accompanied by the police, track them to their location. Quesne is shot dead, and Joan is saved from the fate of the others.

== Cast ==
- Wayne Morris as Walter Garrett (Barnett in the on-screen credits)
- Rosemary Lane as Joan Vance
- Humphrey Bogart as Dr. Maurice Xavier, a.k.a. Marshall Quesne
- Dennis Morgan as Dr. Mike Rhodes
- John Litel as Dr. Francis Flegg
- Lya Lys as Angela Merrova
- Huntz Hall as Pinky
- Charles Wilson as Detective Ray Kincaid (Garrett calls him Roy several times)
- Vera Lewis as Miss Sweetman
- Howard Hickman as Chairman (scenes deleted)
- Olin Howland as Undertaker
- Arthur Aylesworth as Guide
- Cliff Saum as Detective Sergeant Moran
- Creighton Hale as Hotel Manager
- John Ridgely as Rodgers
- Joe Crehan as Editor
- Glen Langan as Intern
- DeWolf Hopper as Intern

== See also ==
- Vampire film
