= Carville: Winning Is Everything, Stupid! =

2024 documentary film directed by Matt Tyrnauer

- Release poster
- Directed by: Matt Tyrnauer
- Produced by: Matt Tyrnauer; Ryan Rothmaier; Corey Reeser; Susan Mccue; Graham High
- Edited by: Ryan Rothmaier
- Music by: Lorne Balfe
- Production companies: Altimeter Films; Foothill Productions
- Distributed by: CNN Films; Greenwich Entertainment
- Release dates: August 30, 2024 (TFF); October 11, 2024 (NY); October 25, 2024 (LA)
- Running time: 98 minutes
- Country: United States
- Language: English
- Box office: $19,207

Carville: Winning Is Everything, Stupid! is a 2024 American documentary film about the life of Democratic political operative James Carville and his marriage to Republican adviser Mary Matalin. It is produced and directed by Matt Tyrnauer. It premiered at the 51st Telluride Film Festival. It was released in New York on October 11, 2024, and in Los Angeles on October 25, 2024.

== Synopsis ==
James Carville recounts his recollections of the Louisiana Governors Huey Long and his brother Governor Earl Long. Snake oil product Hadacol used to be promoted by Dudley LeBlanc in Louisiana. Using LeBlanc as a model, Carville learned how to make politics relatable. Carville was a "poor student" in the early 1960s. He dropped out of college to join the United States Marine Corps. Nonetheless, afterward the Marine Corps, he returned to the same college to obtain his bachelor's degree followed by a law degree. According to himself, he practiced law for two years and "was terrible at it." Then, in 1982, at the age of 38, he consults for a political campaign. In 1984, Lloyd Doggett "gets crushed" in the Reagan landslide—failing in his US Senate bid. So, Walter Isaacson remarks, "James [Carville] was famous for losing races—over and over again!" In 1986, Carville takes a job in the gubernatorial campaign of Bob Casey Sr. Next, the 1991 United States Senate special election in Pennsylvania resulting in Harris Wofford's win increases Carville's exposure as a winning political consultant. Carville warns that "black male" voters are increasingly leaving the Democratic Party. He, moreover, finds fault with "woke" policies like "defund the police." After the 2024 Joe Biden–Donald Trump presidential debate, Carville joins the chorus of Democratic political consultants who say that Joe Biden was "too old."

== Cast ==
- Donna Brazile
- James Carville
- Adam Carolla
- Mary Matalin
- Paul Begala
- Michael Beychock
- Walter Isaacson
- Tim Russert, archival footage
- Mitch Landrieu

== Reception ==
On the review aggregator website Rotten Tomatoes, 100% of 14 critics' reviews are positive, with an average rating of 7.5/10.

Joe Leydon of Variety wrote, "It helps a lot that Carville: Winning Is Everything, Stupid intersperses scenes depicting the high drama of the 2024 presidential race with the relentless evolution of Carville from political neophyte to indefatigable kingmaker." Stephen Farber of The Hollywood Reporter wrote, "Aside from the overemphasis on Joe Biden's age (Carville is only a year or two younger) and stubbornness in remaining in the presidential race — until he didn't — the film may be relevant in introducing young viewers to an experienced operative. And the portrait of a marriage of political contraries may inspire some people to believe in the possibility of finding common ground with someone whose views you mainly despise."
