= Black Widow (soundtrack) =

Black Widow (Original Motion Picture Soundtrack)

Film score by Lorne Balfe
- Released: July 9, 2021
- Genre: Film score
- Length: 79:53
- Labels: Hollywood Records; Marvel Music

Lorne Balfe chronology
The Tomorrow War (2021)	Black Widow (Original Motion Picture Soundtrack) (2021)	The Forgiven (2021)

Black Widow (Original Motion Picture Soundtrack) is the film score for the 2021 Marvel Studios film Black Widow. The score was composed by Lorne Balfe, with the soundtrack album being released by Hollywood Records on July 9, 2021.

== Background ==
Alexandre Desplat was revealed to be composing the music for Black Widow in January 2020. Late in the film's post-production, Lorne Balfe replaced Desplat as composer, which Desplat confirmed in May 2020. Balfe previously composed the additional music and arrangements for Ramin Djawadi's score of the 2008 MCU film, Iron Man. Balfe's score was released digitally by Marvel Music and Hollywood Records on July 9, 2021. Black Widow director Cate Shortland believed Balfe had created a "soulful score that is really Russian".

Balfe employed London's Metro Voices for a 118-piece orchestra and a 60-voice choir singing Russian lyrics, with a 40-voice male choir and 20-voice female choir, doing takes with and without lyrics. These lyrics were adapted from Russian poetry by Alexander Pushkin, Leo Tolstoy and Mikhail Lermontov. Balfe said that "the music of the Red Army was also a massive influence", and that he "wanted to give Yelena that Red Army robustness with her theme." Balfe avoided more cliché Russian instruments like balalaikas as they "didn't fit the film" and could "become a parody".

== Track listing ==
All music composed by Lorne Balfe.

No.	Title	Length
1.	"Natasha's Lullaby"	3:24
2.	"Latrodectus"	2:40
3.	"Fireflies"	3:13
4.	"The Pursuit"	2:53
5.	"The First Bite Is the Deepest"	3:05
6.	"Last Glimmer"	4:19
7.	"Dreykov"	3:34
8.	"You Don't Know Me"	2:01
9.	"Yelena Belova"	3:36
10.	"From the Shadows"	3:44
11.	"Hand in Hand"	2:46
12.	"Blood Ties"	2:54
13.	"Whirlwind"	3:28
14.	"Arise"	2:13
15.	"Natasha's Fragments"	1:55
16.	"A Sister Says Goodbye"	4:14
17.	"I Can't Save Us"	1:51
18.	"Red Rising"	3:57
19.	"The Betrayed"	5:38
20.	"The Descent"	2:05
21.	"Faces to the Sun"	1:51
22.	"Natasha Soars"	2:19
23.	"Last Love"	1:59
24.	"Into the Past"	4:55
25.	"Broken Free"	3:09
26.	"A Calling"	2:10
Total length:		79:53

== Charts ==
Weekly chart performance for Black Widow (Original Motion Picture Soundtrack)
Chart (2023)	Peak position
UK Album Downloads (OCC)	37
UK Soundtrack Albums (OCC)	18

== Additional music ==
A cover of Nirvana's "Smells Like Teen Spirit" by Think Up Anger, featuring Malia J is used in the film's opening credits. Also featured are "American Pie" by Don McLean, Yelena Belova's favorite song as a child, "Cheap Thrills" by Sia and Sean Paul, "Bond Fights Snake" by John Barry, "Atshan Ya Zeina" by Ahmed Mohamed El Gaml, and "Rise Ye Soldiers of Salvation". Alan Silvestri's Avengers theme is also referenced in Balfe's score.
