= List of The Wheel of Time (TV series) soundtracks =

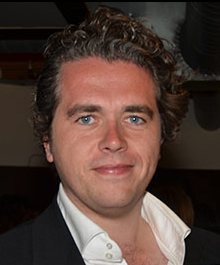
Lorne Balfe is the composer for The Wheel of Time.

The Wheel of Time is an American high fantasy television series developed by Rafe Judkins for Amazon Prime Video, based on the book series of the same name by Robert Jordan and Brandon Sanderson. The music for the series is composed by Lorne Balfe. To date, four soundtrack albums have been released for the first season, and two albums for the second season.

== Season 1 ==
=== The First Turn ===
A soundtrack album for the series, The First Turn, was released a week before television premiere on November 12, 2021, by Milan Records in digital, CD, and vinyl formats. The album contains fourteen tracks that are largely conceptual but include key themes that spawned variations in the final score. Balfe said that "The score to this series is a re-imagination of fantasy music, doing away with the genre's reliance on large, traditional orchestras in favor of more modern colors while retaining the strong melodies and bold harmonies that fans can expect from such an epic."

The Wheel of Time: The First Turn

Soundtrack album by Lorne Balfe
- Released: November 12, 2021
- Genre: Soundtrack
- Length: 53:07
- Label: Sony Music
- Producer: Lorne Balfe

The Wheel of Time music chronology
The Wheel of Time: The First Turn (2021)	The Wheel of Time: Season 1, Vol. 1 (2021)

Lorne Balfe soundtrack chronology
Black Widow (2021)	The Wheel of Time: The First Turn (2021)	Dopesick (2021)

All tracks are written by Lorne Balfe.

The Wheel of Time: The First Turn
No.	Title	Length
1.	"Mashithamel (Young Love)"	3:33
2.	"Moiraine Sedai"	4:08
3.	"Ta'maral'ailen (Web of Destiny)"	4:01
4.	"Aes Sedai (Servants of All)"	2:24
5.	"Ost Ninto Shostya (On Your Knees)"	2:29
6.	"Mashiara (Lost Love)"	6:19
7.	"Al'Naito (The Flame)"	4:08
8.	"Al'Cair Sei (Goldeneyes)"	2:57
9.	"Caisen'shar (Old Blood)"	3:34
10.	"Aman Syndai (Dragon Reborn)"	2:48
11.	"Noriv al Zaffid (Two Halves of One Whole)"	2:00
12.	"Al'Dival (For the Light)"	3:36
13.	"Wab'shar (Bonded)"	4:39
14.	"Mordero'Sheen (Bringers of Death)"	6:28
Total length:		53:07

=== Volume 1 ===
A second album, The Wheel of Time: Season 1, Volume 1, was released on November 19, 2021, featuring music that was largely used in the first season's first three episodes.

The Wheel of Time: Season 1, Vol. 1

Soundtrack album by Lorne Balfe
- Released: November 19, 2021
- Genre: Soundtrack
- Length: 46:44
- Label: Sony Music
- Producer: Lorne Balfe

The Wheel of Time music chronology
The Wheel of Time: The First Turn (2021)	The Wheel of Time: Season 1, Vol. 1 (2021)	The Wheel of Time: Season 1, Vol. 2 (2021)

Lorne Balfe soundtrack chronology
Dopesick (2021)	The Wheel of Time: Season 1, Vol. 1 (2021)	The Wheel of Time: Season 1, Vol. 2 (2021)

All tracks are written by Lorne Balfe.

The Wheel of Time: Season 1, Vol. 1
No.	Title	Length
1.	"The Wheel of Time"	1:35
2.	"The Hunt"	3:29
3.	"Trust the River"	2:41
4.	"Innocence"	2:11
5.	"Lanterns"	3:03
6.	"Trollocs Attack"	2:56
7.	"The Battle at Bel Tine"	4:12
8.	"The Aftermath"	3:28
9.	"Leaving Home"	2:59
10.	"Pyre for Light"	2:54
11.	"Closer to You"	2:15
12.	"Shadar Logoth"	3:42
13.	"The Wisdom"	2:46
14.	"Traversing Planes"	2:08
15.	"Healing"	3:01
16.	"The Choices We're Given"	3:20
Total length:		46:44

=== Volume 2 ===
The Wheel of Time: Season 1, Volume 2 was released on December 3, 2021.

The Wheel of Time: Season 1, Vol. 2

Soundtrack album by Lorne Balfe
- Released: December 3, 2021
- Genre: Soundtrack
- Length: 51:01
- Label: Sony Music
- Producer: Lorne Balfe

The Wheel of Time music chronology
The Wheel of Time: Season 1, Vol. 1 (2021)	The Wheel of Time: Season 1, Vol. 2 (2021)	The Wheel of Time: Season 1, Vol. 3 (2021)

Lorne Balfe soundtrack chronology
The Wheel of Time: Season 1, Vol. 1 (2021)	The Wheel of Time: Season 1, Vol. 2 (2021)	Silent Night (2021)

All tracks are written by Lorne Balfe.

The Wheel of Time: Season 1, Vol. 2
No.	Title	Length
1.	"Storm the Castle"	2:25
2.	"Balance of Power"	3:10
3.	"No Bond is Closer"	2:00
4.	"The Woven Shield"	3:06
5.	"The Way of the Leaf"	3:19
6.	"Tuatha'an Tales"	4:14
7.	"Nightmares"	2:18
8.	"Arrows Fall"	3:15
9.	"Like a Raging Sun"	3:00
10.	"Tar Valon"	2:43
11.	"Breaking the Leaf"	2:25
12.	"Wolf Ambush"	2:15
13.	"Humble Beginnings"	3:46
14.	"Clouded by Greed"	2:25
15.	"Beyond the Hidden Door"	2:53
16.	"Reunited"	3:30
17.	"The Path Forward"	4:09
Total length:		51:01

=== Volume 3 ===
The final album, The Wheel of Time: Season 1, Volume 3, was released on December 17, 2021.

The Wheel of Time: Season 1, Vol. 3

Soundtrack album by Lorne Balfe
- Released: December 17, 2021
- Genre: Soundtrack
- Length: 43:35
- Label: Sony Music
- Producer: Lorne Balfe

The Wheel of Time music chronology
The Wheel of Time: Season 1, Vol. 2 (2021)	The Wheel of Time: Season 1, Vol. 3 (2021)	The Wheel of Time: Season 2, Vol. 1 (2023)

Lorne Balfe soundtrack chronology
Silent Night (2021)	The Wheel of Time: Season 1, Vol. 3 (2021)	Rumble (2021)

All tracks are written by Lorne Balfe.

The Wheel of Time: Season 1, Vol. 3
No.	Title	Length
1.	"A Mother's Strength"	2:08
2.	"Assaulted By Voices"	3:43
3.	"Revelation"	2:59
4.	"Follow Your Heart"	2:12
5.	"You Won't"	2:37
6.	"Cracks of Light"	2:24
7.	"War Council"	5:10
8.	"Call to Arms"	2:29
9.	"Sisters United"	2:42
10.	"Life or Death"	7:24
11.	"False Promise"	5:57
12.	"From the West"	3:47
Total length:		43:35

== Season 2 ==
On January 12, 2022, Balfe confirmed that he would be returning to score the second season.

=== Volume 1 ===
The Wheel of Time: Season 2, Volume 1 was released on September 8, 2023.

The Wheel of Time: Season 2, Vol. 1

Soundtrack album by Lorne Balfe
- Released: September 8, 2023
- Genre: Soundtrack
- Length: 35:05
- Label: Sony Music
- Producer: Lorne Balfe

The Wheel of Time music chronology
The Wheel of Time: Season 1, Vol. 3 (2021)	The Wheel of Time: Season 2, Vol. 1 (2023)

Lorne Balfe soundtrack chronology
Gran Turismo (2023)	The Wheel of Time: Season 2, Vol. 1 (2023)	The Wheel of Time: Season 2, Vol. 2 (2023)

All tracks are written by Lorne Balfe.

The Wheel of Time: Season 2, Vol. 1
No.	Title	Length
1.	"The Desert Warriors"	3:23
2.	"The Hailene"	3:09
3.	"Darkness and Shadows"	3:59
4.	"Liandrin Guirale"	2:23
5.	"Aviendha"	2:15
6.	"Mat Cauthon"	3:15
7.	"The Dragon's Heart"	2:41
8.	"Egwene al'Vere"	3:02
9.	"Nynaeve al'Meara"	3:10
10.	"Last Light"	3:19
11.	"Coming Home"	4:24
Total length:		35:05

=== Volume 2 ===
The Wheel of Time: Season 2, Volume 2 was released on September 22, 2023.

The Wheel of Time: Season 2, Vol. 2

Soundtrack album by Lorne Balfe
- Released: September 22, 2023
- Genre: Soundtrack
- Length: 49:28
- Label: Sony Music
- Producer: Lorne Balfe

The Wheel of Time music chronology
The Wheel of Time: Season 2, Vol. 1 (2021)	The Wheel of Time: Season 2, Vol. 2 (2023)

Lorne Balfe soundtrack chronology
The Wheel of Time: Season 2, Vol. 1 (2023)	The Wheel of Time: Season 2, Vol. 2 (2023)

All tracks are written by Lorne Balfe.

The Wheel of Time: Season 2, Vol. 2
No.	Title	Length
1.	"Damane"	2:22
2.	"The Well"	3:39
3.	"Family Reunion"	3:31
4.	"The Bond That Cannot Break"	2:22
5.	"Evil Has No Limits"	2:54
6.	"New Beginnings"	4:31
7.	"Face It On Your Feet"	3:24
8.	"Making Plans"	2:11
9.	"A Daring Rescue"	2:25
10.	"Desert Dreams"	2:44
11.	"Uprising"	3:30
12.	"The Thrill of Battle"	4:10
13.	"The Test"	2:10
14.	"The Horn of Valere"	2:52
15.	"Echoes of the Past"	2:55
16.	"The Source of Power"	3:42
Total length:		49:28

== Reception ==
James Southall of Movie Wave wrote "It is essential to approach The Wheel of Time with an open mind–it is far from what you would expect of the music for an epic fantasy, either in an historical sense or more modern examples. For me though it's really quite impressive what Lorne Balfe has conjured up–it's a sound that very much works in the context of the show and also one I've found has become quite compelling on these albums." Calling it as "intimidating and epic" Emma Ayars of Collider summarized "the soundtrack at times flattens the show's extensive lore. It serves its purpose in the series and the vocals are impressive, but it ranks lowest on the list for its lack of diversity in its musical choices."
