= Lya Lys =

American actress

- Born: Nathalie Margoulis; May 18, 1908; Berlin, German Empire
- Died: June 2, 1986 (aged 78); Newport Beach, California, U.S.
- Other names: Natalie Margulis; Natalie Löscht
- Occupation: Actress
- Years active: 1929–1940
- Spouses: Charles Morton (m. 1931; div. 1932) (1 child) Percy Montague (m. 1932; div. 1933) John Gunnerson (m. 1940; div. 1943) George Feit (m. 1954)

Lya Lys (born Nathalie Margoulis; May 18, 1908 – June 2, 1986) was a German-born American actress.

== Biography ==
Lya Lys was born in Berlin on May 18, 1908 to a Russian banker and French pediatrician who moved to Paris when she was about seven. Her mother was Ina Löscht (née Blumenfeld), who later served at a French field hospital during the early months of World War II. Her fate during or after the German invasion is unclear. Nathalie was educated in France and Switzerland and later studied language at the Sorbonne.

In the late 1920s, Lya Lys was among a group of French actors that included Charles Boyer, André Berley, and Mona Goya, who were brought to Hollywood by MGM to work on films intended for the French market. Reportedly, after her contract expired, Lys received a Hollywood movie offer just as she was about to board an ocean liner to return to Europe. In 1930, Lys returned to Paris to star in Salvador Dalí and Luis Buñuel's surrealist film, L'Age d'Or (1930), considered by many as her most memorable performance. She then returned to America.

In 1931 she married Charles Morton, a young silent film actor. The couple divorced some months later not long after the birth of their daughter. Later a dispute over alimony payments would see Morton spending a few days behind bars. Her second marriage to Percy Montague, a business manager, in April 1932 ended in divorce sometime before the end of the decade. Lys took US citizenship in 1933.

Just prior to the outbreak of World War II, Lya Lys was in Paris to perform in the play The King's Dough. As the possibility of war became more imminent she decided it prudent to return to America. Because of the number of refugees fleeing Europe, Lys was unable to obtain passage on a passenger ship from France and was advised to travel north to a less crowded Scandinavian port. This meant crossing through Nazi Germany where Lys, by then an American citizen, was detained by German border guards for two or three days. Sometime earlier she'd bluntly turned down an offer by a Nazi official to appear in German propaganda films. Lys was finally allowed to leave after having her luggage searched and travel money confiscated. Some months later she appeared in the American anti-Nazi film Confessions of a Nazi Spy.

Once while filming a scene in the 1939 film The Return of Doctor X, actor Dennis Morgan took Lys by the arm and broke into song when she became upset over blowing her lines. A moment later Humphrey Bogart, who was also in the scene, joined Morgan in the serenade. Lys' early Hollywood career was hampered by her thick accent. By the time she appeared in Paramount's The Great Gambini (1937) and toured in the play Night of January 16, it had become barely noticeable. She appeared in films with Ronald Reagan, was a friend of Clark Gable, and a frequent guest at the Hearst estate. For much of the time, she lived on Park Avenue near Central Park in New York City, enjoying the city's lifestyle.

In 1940, she married John Gunnerson, a Chicago vending machine manufacturer and former husband of actress Anna Q. Nilsson. Their marriage, which Lys later described as the worst mistake of her life, ended in a Mexican divorce in 1943, some nine months after she'd suffered a nervous breakdown. On the same day she filed for divorce, with no request for alimony. She never returned to acting. Her last film was Murder in the Air (1940) opposite Ronald Reagan. Lys' name continued to appear in the papers for a few years in columns giving fashion advice. In 1954 she married George Feit. Lya was one of the first people to raise and show champion Afghan Hounds at Madison Square Garden.

Lya Lys Feit died on June 2, 1986, at Hoag Memorial Hospital in Newport Beach, from heart failure at the age of 78. She was survived by George Feit, her husband of 32 years, daughter Joyce Morton, grandson Randy Caruso, Author, Marisa Rudder and two granddaughters.

== Legacy ==
Jacqueline Susann's play, The Temporary Mrs. Smith, is a story about a likable, but less than talented singer whose search for a rich husband is complicated by her former husbands, was in part based on the life of Lya Lys. At one time the two were neighbors at the Hotel Navarro near New York's Central Park.

Critic Ado Kyrou wrote of Ava Gardner's Pandora in the 1951 film Pandora and the Flying Dutchman, "Ava now belonged in the exclusive pantheon with Lya Lys of Dalí and Buñuel's L'Age d'Or as the greatest surrealistic woman in the history of film'."

== Filmography ==
- 1929: Maman Colibri as La jeune femme
- 1930: Morals at Midnight as Nora
- 1930: L'Age d'Or as Young Girl
- 1930: Soyons gais
- 1931: Casanova wider Willen
- 1931: Buster se marie
- 1933: Clear All Wires! as Eugenie Smirnova
- 1933: The Big Brain as Minor Role (uncredited)
- 1933: Jimmy and Sally as Pola Wenski
- 1933: Enemies of Society
- 1934: The Merry Widow as Newswoman (uncredited)
- 1935: The Lives of a Bengal Lancer as Girl on Train (uncredited)
- 1935: George White's 1935 Scandals as French Girl - Old Southern Custom (uncredited)
- 1935: Vagabond Lady as Pat, Tony's friend
- 1937: The Great Gambini as Luba
- 1937: My Dear Miss Aldrich as The Queen (uncredited)
- 1938: The Young in Heart as Lucille (uncredited)
- 1939: Confessions of a Nazi Spy as Erika Wolf
- 1939: The Return of Doctor X as Angela Merrova
- 1940: Murder in the Air as Hilda Riker, a.k.a. Mrs. Steve Swenko (final film role)
