= Valentino: The Last Emperor =

- Promotional film poster
- Directed by: Matt Tyrnauer
- Produced by: Matt Kapp; Matt Tyrnauer
- Starring: Giancarlo Giammetti; Valentino Garavani
- Cinematography: Tom Hurwitz
- Edited by: Bob Eisenhardt; Frédéric Tcheng
- Production company: Acolyte Films
- Distributed by: Truly Indie
- Release dates: September 7, 2008 (Toronto); March 18, 2009 (United States)
- Running time: 96 minutes
- Country: United States
- Languages: English; French; Italian
- Box office: $2.2 million

Valentino: The Last Emperor is a 2008 documentary film produced and directed by Matt Tyrnauer, a special correspondent for Vanity Fair magazine. The film is an exploration of the singular world of Italian fashion designer Valentino Garavani. The film documents the dramatic closing act of Valentino's career, tells the story of his life, and explores the larger themes affecting the fashion business. At the heart of the film is the relationship between Valentino and his business partner and companion of 50 years, Giancarlo Giammetti.

== Production ==
In production from June 2005 to July 2007, the filmmakers shot over 250 hours of footage with exclusive access to Valentino and his entourage. "We were let in to the inner circle, but we had to stick it out for a long time, practically move in, to capture the truly great moments," says Tyrnauer. "Valentino is surrounded by a tight-knit family of friends and employees, but, eventually, their guard came down and they forgot there was a camera crew in the room."

"Valentino was one of the first designers to make himself the inspirational figure at the center of the story he was telling," says Tyrnauer. "He is a born dreamer and the last true couturier, who let us in on his creative process and also let us in on the life he built around him to sustain this process," adds Tyrnauer. "He lives as lavishly as his clients and set a standard for the industry. He shuts out all that is not beautiful, and we followed him around the world to capture that special world."

== Release ==
Shot in widescreen high-definition, Valentino The Last Emperor premiered at film festivals beginning in August 2008, with gala premiere parties and special events.

Valentino The Last Emperor had its world premiere at the 2008 Venice International Film Festival and its North American Premiere at the 2008 Toronto International Film Festival. In March 2009, Valentino The Last Emperor was released theatrically in New York. The film was called by Indiewire the highest grossing documentary debut of 2009. Throughout April, the film opened theatrically in U.S cities.

== Reception ==
On the review aggregator website Rotten Tomatoes, 78% of 73 critics' reviews are positive. The website's consensus reads: "Valentino: the Last Emperor utilizes its access to the fashion icon to the fullest, and the result is a glitzy, dishy, and insightful documentary." Metacritic, which uses a weighted average, assigned the film a score of 68 out of 100, based on 22 critics, indicating "generally favorable" reviews.
