= Roy Cohn =

American lawyer and prosecutor (1927–1986)

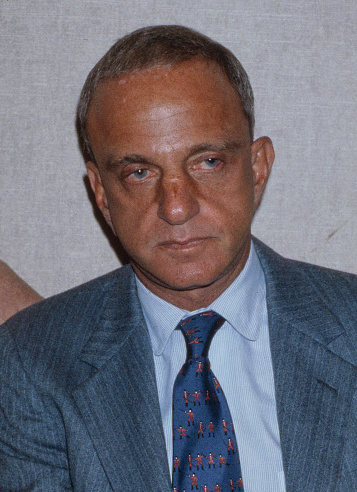
- Cohn in 1981

Special Assistant to the Attorney General for Internal Security
- In office September 3, 1952 – January 20, 1953
- President: Harry S. Truman
- Attorney General: James P. McGranery

Personal details
- Born: Roy Marcus Cohn; February 20, 1927 New York City, U.S.
- Died: August 2, 1986 (aged 59) Bethesda, Maryland, U.S.
- Cause of death: Complications due to HIV/AIDS
- Parent: Albert C. Cohn (father)
- Relatives: Joshua Lionel Cowen (maternal great-uncle)
- Education: Columbia University (BA, LLB)
- Occupation: Activist; author; lawyer; political campaign staffer; law professor
- Known for: Prosecution of Julius and Ethel Rosenberg (1951); Chief Counsel to Permanent Subcommittee on Investigations (1951–1954); Attorney to Donald Trump (1973–1986)
- Movement: Jewish conservatism; McCarthyism

Roy Marcus Cohn (/koʊn/ KOHN; February 20, 1927 – August 2, 1986) was an American lawyer, prosecutor, and conservative political activist. He first gained fame as a prosecutor of Julius and Ethel Rosenberg in their trials (1952–1953) and as Senator Joseph McCarthy's chief counsel during the Army–McCarthy hearings in 1954. Cohn had been assisting McCarthy's investigations of suspected communists. In the 1970s and during the 1980s, he became a prominent legal and political fixer in New York City. He represented and mentored Donald Trump during Trump's early business career.

Cohn was born in the Bronx in New York City and educated at Columbia University. He rose to prominence as a U.S. Department of Justice prosecutor at the espionage trial of Julius and Ethel Rosenberg, where he successfully prosecuted the Rosenbergs, which led to their conviction and execution in 1953. After his time as prosecuting chief counsel during the McCarthy trials, his reputation deteriorated during the late 1950s to late 1970s as he settled in New York City and became a private lawyer to many clients, including real estate magnates, political operatives, Catholic clergy and organized crime.

In 1986, Cohn was disbarred by the Appellate Division of the New York State Supreme Court for unethical conduct after attempting to defraud a dying client by forcing him to sign a will amendment leaving his fortune to Cohn. Cohn died five weeks later from AIDS-related complications, having vehemently denied that he was HIV-positive. Cohn has been the subject of many media portrayals before and since his death.

== Early life and education ==
Roy Marcus Cohn was born on February 20, 1927 into an affluent Ashkenazi Jewish family in the Bronx, New York City. He was the only child of Dora (née Marcus) and Justice Albert C. Cohn; Cohn's father was an assistant district attorney of Bronx County at the time, and was later appointed as a judge of the Appellate Division of the New York State Supreme Court. His maternal great-uncle was Joshua Lionel Cowen, the founder and long-time owner of the Lionel Corporation, a manufacturer of toy trains. A botched pediatric surgery to modify the appearance of his nose left Cohn with a prominent scar.

Cohn and his mother were close; they lived together until her death in 1967 and she was constantly attentive to his grades, appearance and relationships. When Cohn's father insisted that his son be sent to a summer camp, his mother rented a house near the camp and her presence cast a pall over his experience. In personal interactions, Cohn showed tenderness which was absent from his public persona, but he was described as vain and deeply insecure.

Cohn's maternal grandfather Joseph S. Marcus founded the Bank of United States in 1913. The bank failed in 1931 during the Great Depression, and its then-president Bernie Marcus, Cohn's uncle, was convicted of fraud. Bernie Marcus was imprisoned at Sing Sing, and the young Cohn frequently visited him there.

After attending Fieldston School and the Horace Mann School and completing studies at Columbia University in 1946, Cohn graduated from Columbia Law School at the age of 20.

== Early career ==
After graduating from law school, Cohn worked as a clerk for the U.S. Attorney for the Southern District of New York for two years. In May 1948, at age 21, he was old enough to be admitted to the New York bar. He became an assistant U.S. attorney later that month. That same year, Cohn also became a board member of the American Jewish League Against Communism.

As an Assistant U.S. Attorney, Cohn helped to secure convictions in a number of well-publicized trials of accused Soviet moles. One of the first began in December 1950 with the prosecution of William Remington, a former Commerce Department employee and member of the War Production Board who had been charged with espionage following the defection of former KGB handler Elizabeth Bentley. Although an indictment for espionage could not be secured, Remington had denied his long-time membership in the Communist Party USA under oath on two separate occasions and was later convicted of perjury in two separate trials.

While working in Irving H. Saypol's office for the Southern District of New York, Cohn assisted with the prosecutor's case against 11 senior members of the American Communist Party for advocating for the violent overthrow of the U.S. Federal Government, under the Smith Act.

By November 19, 1952, he was also reported to be working as adjunct professor at New York Law School. There, he taught criminology and legal ethics. Cohn was no longer teaching at NYLS by 1981, with his last reported activity being in 1979.

== Rosenberg trial ==
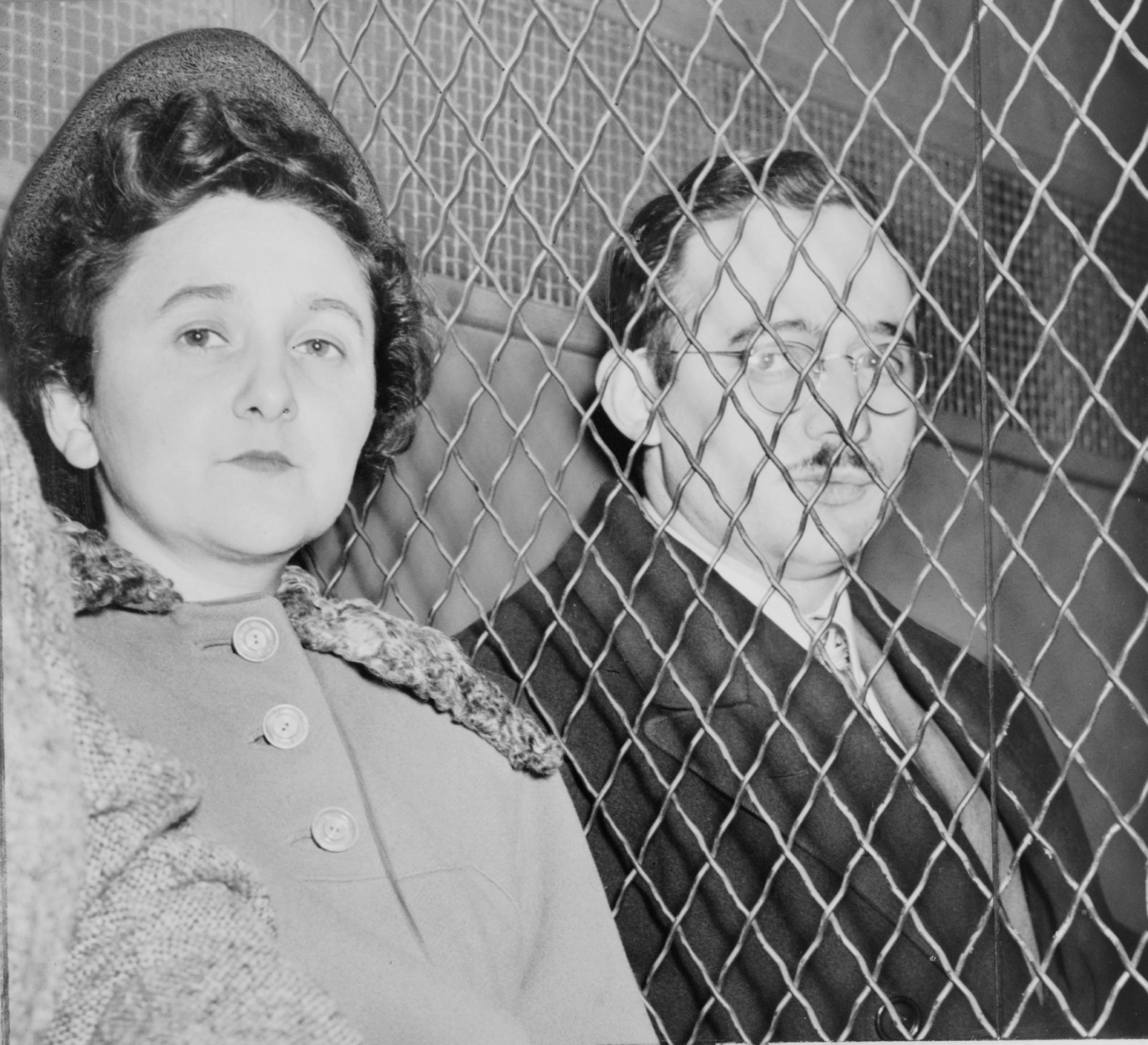
Ethel and Julius Rosenberg after their jury conviction in 1951

Cohn played a prominent role in the 1951 espionage trial of Julius and Ethel Rosenberg. Cohn's direct examination of Ethel's brother, David Greenglass, produced testimony that was central to the Rosenbergs' conviction and subsequent execution. Greenglass testified that he had assisted the espionage activities of his brother-in-law by acting as a courier of classified documents that had been stolen from the Manhattan Project by Klaus Fuchs.

Greenglass would later change his story and allege that he committed perjury at the trial in order "to protect himself and his wife, Ruth, and that he was encouraged by the prosecution to do so." Cohn always took great pride in the Rosenberg verdict and claimed to have played an even greater part than his public role. He said in his autobiography that his own influence had led to both Chief Prosecutor Saypol and Judge Irving Kaufman being appointed to the case. Cohn further said that Kaufman imposed the death penalty for Ethel based on his personal recommendation while Kaufman had told Cohn he decided before the trial began that he was going to impose the death penalty on Julius. Cohn denied, however, participation in any illegal ex parte discussions.

Consensus among legal scholars is that Julius Rosenberg was guilty of being a highly valued NKVD spymaster against the United States, but that his trial was marred by prosecutorial misconduct—mainly by Cohn—and in 2016, the general legal characterization of the Rosenbergs' execution was changed to “ill-advised,” and in 2018 changed again to “unwarranted.” Summarizing both these consensuses, Harvard Law School professor Alan Dershowitz wrote that the Rosenbergs were "guilty—and framed."

== Work with Joseph McCarthy ==
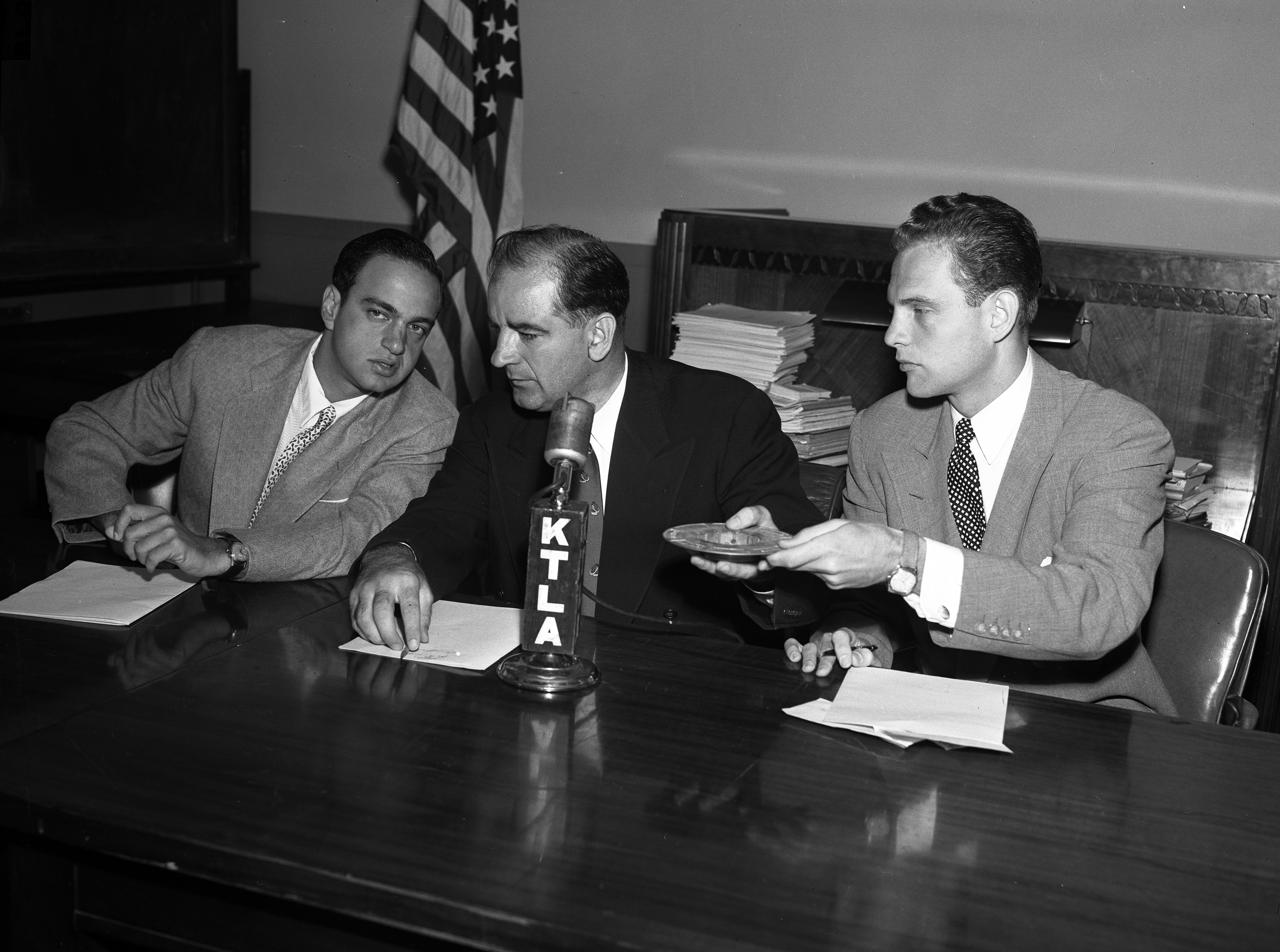
Roy Cohn, Joseph McCarthy, and G. David Schine in 1953

The Rosenberg trial brought the 24-year-old Cohn to the attention of Federal Bureau of Investigation (FBI) director J. Edgar Hoover. With support from Hoover and Cardinal Spellman, Hearst columnist George Sokolsky convinced Joseph McCarthy to hire Cohn as his chief counsel, choosing him over Robert F. Kennedy. Cohn assisted McCarthy with his work for the Senate Permanent Subcommittee on Investigations, becoming known for his aggressive questioning of suspected Communists. Cohn preferred not to hold hearings in open forums, which went well with McCarthy's preference for holding "executive sessions" and "off-the-record" sessions away from the Capitol to minimize public scrutiny and to question witnesses with relative impunity. Cohn was given free rein in pursuit of many investigations, with McCarthy joining in only for the more publicized sessions.

Cohn played a major role in McCarthy's anti-Communist hearings. During the Lavender Scare, Cohn and McCarthy alleged that Soviet Bloc intelligence services had blackmailed multiple U.S. Federal Government employees into committing espionage in return for not exposing their closeted homosexuality. In response, President Dwight Eisenhower signed Executive Order 10450 on April 27, 1953, to ban homosexuals, whom he considered a national security risk, from being employed by the federal government. According to David L. Marcus, Cohn's cousin, many Federal employees in Washington, D.C. whom Cohn and McCarthy exposed as homosexuals committed suicide. As time went on, it became well known that Cohn was himself gay, although he always denied it. McCarthy and Cohn were responsible for the firing of many gay men from government employment, and strong-armed opponents into silence using rumors of their homosexuality. Former U.S. Senator Alan K. Simpson wrote: "The so-called 'Red Scare' has been the main focus of most historians of that period of time. A lesser-known element…and one that harmed far more people was the witch-hunt McCarthy and others conducted against homosexuals."

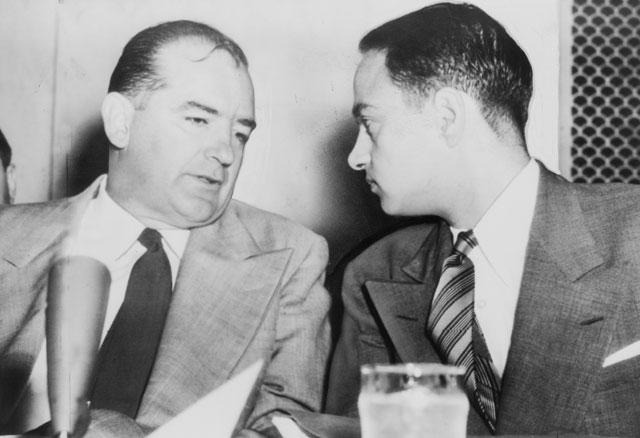
Senator Joseph McCarthy chats with Cohn at the Army–McCarthy hearings in 1954

Sokolsky introduced G. David Schine, an anti-Communist propagandist, to Cohn, who invited him to join McCarthy's staff as an unpaid consultant. When Schine was drafted into the U.S. Army in 1953, Cohn made extensive efforts to procure special treatment for him, even threatening to "wreck the Army" if his demands were not met. That conflict, along with McCarthy's claims that there were Communists in the Defense Department, led to the Army–McCarthy hearings of 1954, during which the Army charged Cohn and McCarthy with using improper pressure on Schine's behalf, and McCarthy and Cohn countercharged that the Army was holding Schine "hostage" in an attempt to squelch McCarthy's investigations into Communists in the Army. The Army-McCarthy hearings ultimately contributed to McCarthy's censure by the Senate later that year. After resigning from McCarthy's staff, Cohn returned to New York and entered private practice as an attorney.

== Legal career in New York ==
After resigning from McCarthy's staff, Cohn had a 30-year career as an attorney in New York City. His clients included Donald Trump; New York Yankees baseball club owner George Steinbrenner; Aristotle Onassis; Mafia figures Tony Salerno, Carmine Galante, John Gotti, Paul Castellano, and Mario Gigante; Studio 54 owners Steve Rubell and Ian Schrager; the Roman Catholic Archdiocese of New York; Texas financier and philanthropist Shearn Moody Jr.; and business owner Richard Dupont. Dupont, then 48, was convicted of aggravated harassment and attempted grand larceny for his attempts at coercing further representation by Cohn for a bogus claim to property ownership in a case against the actual owner of 644 Greenwich Street, Manhattan, where Dupont had operated Big Gym, and from where he had been evicted in January 1979. Cohn's other clients included retired Harvard Law School professor Alan Dershowitz, who has referenced Cohn as "the quintessential fixer".

== Indictments ==
In the 1960s, Robert Morgenthau as U.S. Attorney for the Southern District indicted Cohn three times in six years on various charges. He was acquitted on all charges.

In September 1963, Cohn and attorney Murray Gottesman were indicted for perjury and obstruction of justice, alleging that they had obstructed a federal investigation into allegations that Samuel S. Garfield and others defrauded United Dye and Chemical Corporation out of $5 million. On July 17, 1964, Cohn and Gottesman were acquitted on all charges. In January 1969, he was again indicted for conspiracy, extortion and blackmail. According to the indictment, Cohn had blackmailed some of the shareholders of Fifth Avenue Coach Lines into selling their shares, which led to the B.S.F. Company (a holding company headed by Victor Muscat) taking control of Fifth Avenue Coach Lines's bus routes. Judge Inzer Bass Wyatt dismissed the blackmail charge against Cohn. Cohn was acquitted.

== Political activities ==
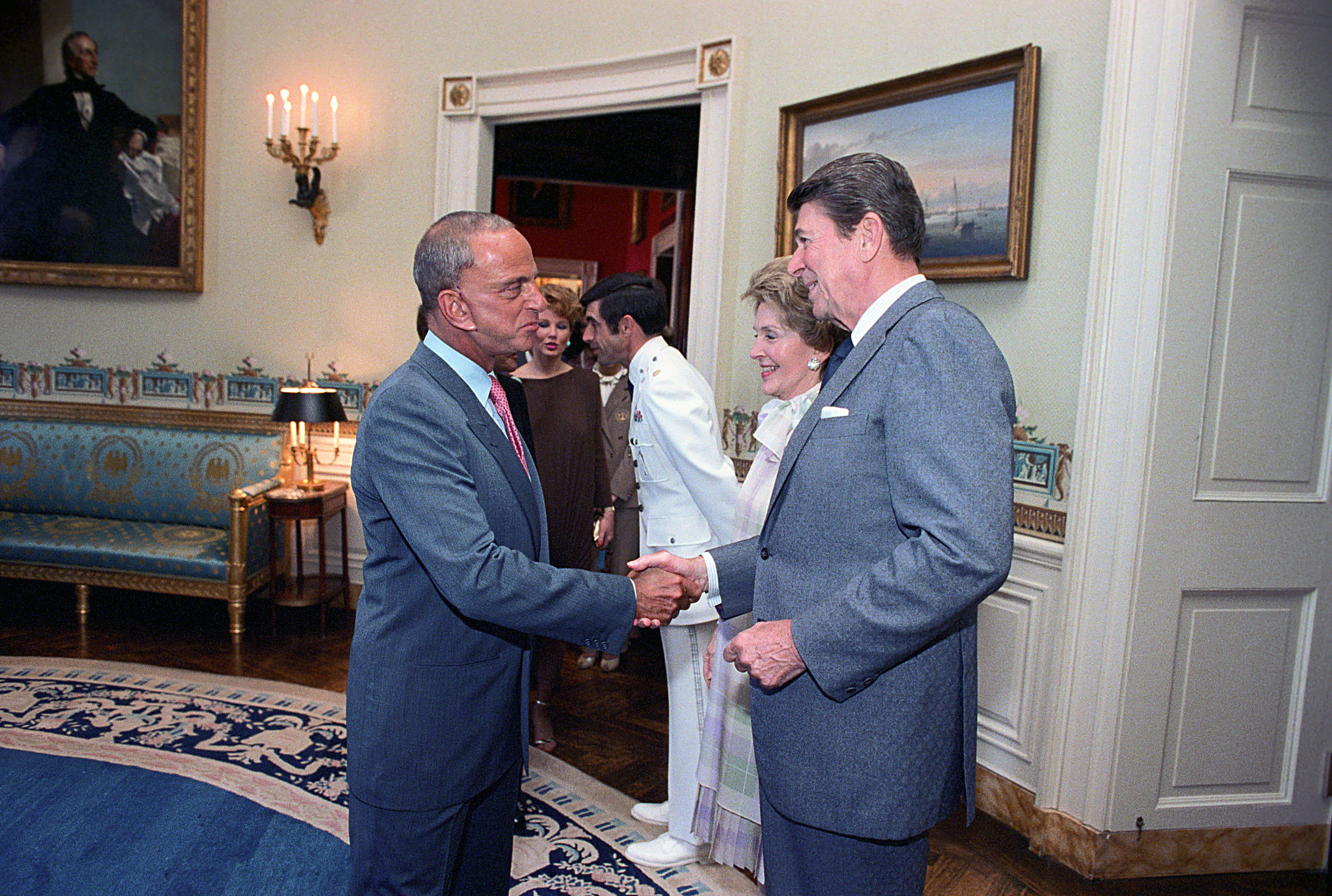
Cohn with President Ronald Reagan and Nancy Reagan at the White House in 1982

In 1979, Cohn became a member of the Western Goals Foundation; he served on the board of directors with Edward Teller. Cohn was also claimed to have been a member of the John Birch Society, though he publicly opposed the group despite being part of the affiliated Western Goals Foundation. Although he was registered as a Democrat, Cohn supported most of the Republican presidents of his time and Republicans in major offices across New York. Bird and Goldmark report that Cohn voted for Jimmy Carter in 1976, having grown impatient with the old-guard Republican Party that Gerald Ford represented, but was soon disillusioned with Carter, particularly over the Panama Canal treaties. He maintained close ties in conservative political circles, serving as an informal advisor to Richard Nixon and Ronald Reagan. While aligning himself with Republicans he simultaneously forged close ties to Democrats including New York mayor Ed Koch, New York secretary of state Carmine DeSapio, and Brooklyn party boss Meade Esposito.

In 1972, he helped Nixon discredit the candidacy of George McGovern's Vice Presidential running mate Thomas Eagleton by leaking Eagleton's medical records to the press. Eagleton's medical record unveiled that he had been treated for depression.

During the years of debate over the passage of New York's first gay rights bill, Cohn would align himself with the Archdiocese of New York and express his conviction that "homosexual teachers are a grave threat to our children".

=== Association with Ronald Reagan ===
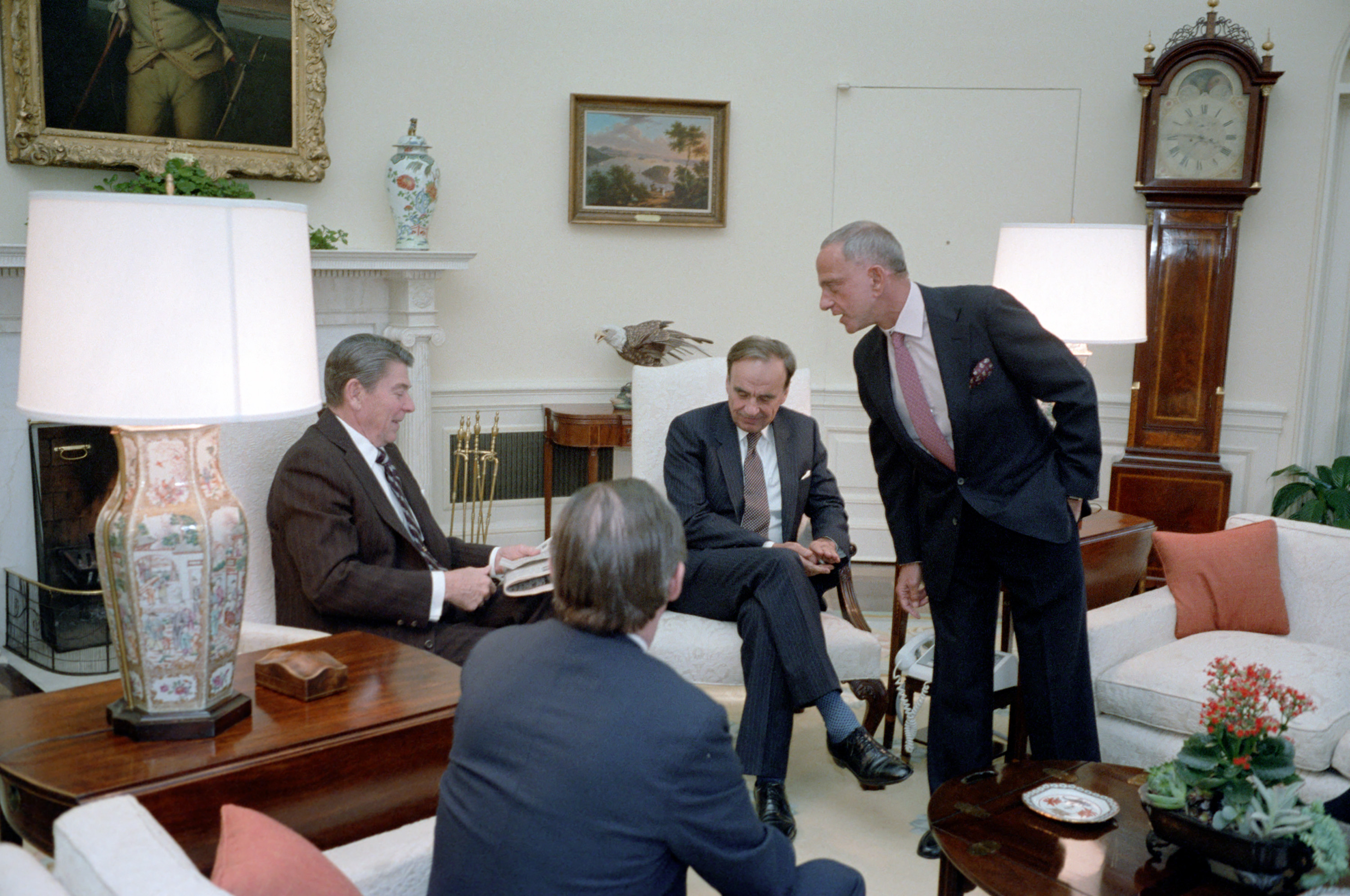
President Reagan meets with Rupert Murdoch, Roy Cohn, and Thomas Bolan at the White House in 1983

Cohn worked on the 1980 Reagan campaign, where he befriended Roger Stone. Cohn aided Roger Stone in Ronald Reagan's presidential campaign in 1979–1980, helping Stone arrange for John B. Anderson to get the nomination of the Liberal Party of New York, a move that would help split the opposition to Reagan in the state. Stone said Cohn gave him a suitcase that Stone avoided opening and, as instructed by Cohn, he dropped it off at the office of a lawyer influential in Liberal Party circles. Reagan carried the state with 46% of the vote to Carter's 44%, with Anderson taking over 7% of the vote. Speaking after the statute of limitations for bribery had expired, Stone said, "I paid his law firm. Legal fees. I don't know what he did for the money, but whatever it was, the Liberal Party reached its right conclusion out of a matter of principle."

Rupert Murdoch was a client, and Cohn repeatedly pressured President Ronald Reagan to further Murdoch's interests. He is credited with introducing Trump and Murdoch, in the mid-1970s, marking the beginning of what was to be a long association between the two.

=== Representation of Donald Trump ===
In 1971, Donald Trump first undertook large construction projects in Manhattan. In 1973, the Justice Department accused Trump of violating the Fair Housing Act in 39 of his properties. The government alleged that Trump's corporation quoted different rental terms and conditions and made false "no vacancy" statements to Black applicants for apartments it managed in Brooklyn, Queens, and Staten Island. Representing Trump, Cohn filed a countersuit against the government for $100 million, asserting that the charges were "irresponsible and baseless". The countersuit was unsuccessful. Trump settled the charges out of court in 1975, saying he was satisfied that the agreement did not "compel the Trump organization to accept persons on welfare as tenants unless as qualified as any other tenant." The corporation was required to send a bi-weekly list of vacancies to the New York Urban League, a civil rights group, and give the league priority for certain locations. In 1978, the Trump Organization was again in court for violating terms of the 1975 settlement; Cohn called the new charges "nothing more than a rehash of complaints by a couple of planted malcontents." Trump denied the charges.

While representing Trump, Cohn also represented mobster Anthony Salerno, who along with other mobsters controlled the concrete unions in New York. Cohn is alleged to have introduced Salerno to Trump, which later led to Salerno's aiding Trump in the construction of Trump Tower by providing concrete at reduced prices.

In his 1987 book The Art of the Deal Trump wrote about "all the hundreds of 'respectable' guys who made careers out of boasting about their uncompromising integrity but have absolutely no loyalty …. What I liked most about Roy Cohn was that he would do just the opposite."

Trump has often been described as having abandoned Cohn once he learned that Cohn was dying of AIDS, a version summed up in a remark attributed to Cohn: "Donald pisses ice water." In American Scoundrel (2026), Kai Bird and Susan Goldmark argue that this is not entirely accurate. Citing Chris Seymour, a switchboard operator at Cohn's Manhattan law firm, they write that Trump began to keep his distance and relied on Cohn less as a lawyer, the calls between them becoming fewer, but did not cut him off; in March 1986, five months before Cohn's death, Trump hosted a farewell dinner for him at Mar-a-Lago. A witness reported seeing Trump weeping at Cohn's memorial service.

== Lionel trains ==
Cohn was the grand-nephew of Joshua Lionel Cowen, founder of the Lionel model train company. By 1959, Cowen and his son Lawrence had become involved in a family dispute over control of the company. In October 1959, Cohn and a group of investors stepped in and gained control of the company, having bought 200,000 of the firm's 700,000 shares, which were purchased by his syndicate from the Cowens and on the open market over a three-month period prior to the takeover. Under Cohn's three-and-a-half-year leadership, Lionel was plagued by declining sales, quality-control problems and huge financial losses. In 1963, Cohn was forced to resign from the company after losing a proxy fight.

== Disbarment and death ==
In 1986, a five-judge panel of the Appellate Division of the New York State Supreme Court disbarred Cohn for unethical and unprofessional conduct, including misappropriation of clients' funds, lying on a bar application, and falsifying a change to a will. The last charge arose from an incident in 1975, when Cohn entered the hospital room of the dying and unconscious Lewis Rosenstiel, forced a pen into his hand, and lifted it to a document appointing himself and Cathy Frank, Rosenstiel's granddaughter, executors. The resulting marks were determined in court to be indecipherable and in no way a valid signature. Despite the disbarment, many famous people showed up as character witnesses, including Barbara Walters, Firing Line host William F. Buckley Jr., and Donald Trump.

AIDS Memorial Quilt panel for Roy Cohn, 1988

In 1984, Cohn was diagnosed with AIDS and attempted to keep his condition secret while receiving experimental drug treatment. He participated in clinical trials of AZT, a drug initially synthesized to treat cancer but later developed as the first anti-HIV agent for AIDS patients. He insisted until his death he was ill with liver cancer. He died on August 2, 1986, at a hospital at the National Institutes of Health campus in Bethesda, Maryland, due to complications from AIDS. He was 59. After his death, the IRS seized almost everything he had including his house, cars, bank accounts, and other personal property and assets. According to Roger Stone, Cohn's "absolute goal was to die completely broke and owing millions to the IRS. He succeeded in that." One of the things that the IRS did not seize was a pair of counterfeit Bulgari diamond cuff links given to him by Trump, his former mentee.

Cohn is buried in Union Field Cemetery in Queens, New York. His tombstone describes him as a lawyer and a patriot. His AIDS Memorial Quilt panel is white with the words "Roy Cohn. Bully. Coward. Victim" written on it, with "Roy Cohn" in black letters, "victim" in blue, "bully" in red and "coward" in yellow.

== Views ==
In his autobiography, Cohn was described as an ideologically "hard-line, right-wing, pro-Nixon Republican". He is also regarded as a staunch anti-communist and History.com calls him the "chief architect" of McCarthyism. Later cultural depictions portray him as ultraconservative.

Peter Manso, on Politico, said Cohn was racist, antisemitic, homophobic, and misogynistic.

=== Economic views ===
==== Taxes ====
In How to Stand Up for Your Rights—and Win! Cohn stated he moved because he was "tired of supporting our welfare and food stamp programs", adding, "Only a fool pays more tax than is legally required." Invoking Learned Hand, he argued there is "nothing sinister" about keeping taxes low, noting there are "more direct ways" of financially contributing to the federal government than through the IRS.

He claims the "15 percent state income tax ... property and gross occupancy taxes" are evidence that the New York State government is overextended, and criticizes their funding of "welfare rolls ... a slew of unnecessary bureaucratic jobs", and a pension system that can exceed "up to 120 percent" of on-job pay.

Cohn advocated for "paying as little as the law allows". However, he warned, "There is a very fine line between tax avoidance—perfectly proper—and tax evasion." Still, if a deduction is "reasonably arguable", it should be forwarded 'argued openly', with careful documentation and detailed records.

He also argues IRS audits can be "vendettas", with the agency itself used "to harass or destroy an enemy". In his own case, he says the IRS disallowed "every substantial deduction", while his law firm paid his expenses and left him enough for personal living costs and current taxes.

In The Autobiography of Roy Cohn, Sidney Zion summarized Cohn as someone who "cared nothing about money", instead being "in it for the game, [and] the power".

==== Consumer affairs ====
Cohn insisted that "price tags are generally negotiable", warning against the "sucker's gambit" of accepting the first figure, urging consumers to ask for a lower "bottom price", cash discounts, and not be embarrassed to advocate for themselves. He also urges consumers to "ask for a receipt", check such, and ensure promises are "in writing".

On regulatory policy, he argues that public agencies claiming to protect consumers often serve industry. Regarding the practice of bumping in the airline industry, he cites the Civil Aeronautics Board as an example that "was formed to promote the interests of the airline industry", and he considers the above practice a result of incentive failure and fine print.

In the lodging industry, he rejects the idea that higher liability costs would be passed on to everyone, as it would remove incentives for careful management. He explains that better-run establishments should be cheaper, thereby driving out negligent competitors.

In real estate, he states that a lawyer should ensure "everything significant is written into the contract", and that the contract should specify repairs, contingencies, and escrow terms. He also mentions that a lawyer can often "knock down the purchase price".

=== Social views ===
==== Privacy and civil rights ====
In How to Stand Up for Your Rights—and Win!, he wrote, "Although generally a law-and-order conservative, I have always been deeply troubled by the invasion of privacy" from "wiretapping, searches and seizures, and mail interceptions." He said that when all parties consent, "there is no legal or ethical problem," and that secret surveillance is a serious intrusion on private life.

==== Marriage ====
Cohn suggested couples should rely less on psychiatry and more on common sense, advising them to think twice before splitting up. He emphasized that "marriage is the bulwark of society" and that it "protects children." In custody disputes, he preferred the parent who can best provide stability but criticized automatic assumptions that favor the mother without question.

He also dismissed palimony as upheld in Marvin v. Marvin, arguing that similar cases "distort reality," and reiterating that "marriage is the bulwark of society." He believed courts should not replace their judgment with that of "the people's representatives". Additionally, he warned that the doctrine can lead to fraud and cloud the social meaning of marriage.

==== Gay rights ====
Cohn stated that "the law [has not] recognized a single homosexual marriage" and that "marriage requires members of the opposite sex." Regarding New York City, he also mentioned that "the Gay Rights Bill has never passed the City Council" and that the ERA and other similar liberal reforms were unsuccessful.

In his autobiography, he expressed harsher views towards homosexuals both publicly and privately. When opposing the aforementioned bill, he told Andrew Stein, "You've gotta get off this fag stuff," and called gay activists "fucking fags."

=== Foreign policy ===
==== Anti-communism ====
Cohn stated that U.S. President Harry Truman "led the war against domestic and international Communism," and that McCarthy's investigations were a continuation of that logic rather than a break. He depicted the anti-Communist effort as the legitimate defense of the United States against the Soviet Union. He emphasized that the administration's loyalty-security program, prosecutions, and the broader anti-Communist campaign had support from both main political parties. Additionally, he described the Soviet Union as having "tentacles" inside the State Department. He claimed he was combating "Stalinist infiltration directly and indirectly into our government, defense, and foreign policy fabric."

==== Europe and the Free World ====
Cohn stated that when the Permanent Subcommittee on Investigations under McCarthy went abroad to see how the United States was presenting its "best foot forward in the fight for men's minds in the Free World," they discovered that overseas libraries were filled with "anti-American, pro-Soviet books." He argued that the purpose of the program was to promote America abroad, not to fund its enemies, dismissing the idea that the former's efforts amounted to censorship; instead, they were part of the information war during the Cold War.

He also remarked that McCarthy was not an isolationist, saying that the latter's concern was keeping Western Europe and Asia from falling to Communism.

==== China and the Korean War ====
Cohn considered international trade with the People's Republic of China during the Korean War a scandal. He states that Western Allied trade with China and other Communist countries exceeded two billion dollars, and that McCarthy was outraged that these allies were profiting while America was engaged in the conflict.

==== Israel and the Middle East ====
Cohn stated that McCarthy was "a friend of the Jews and the new State of Israel," and the former's autobiographical account later characterized Cohn as "consistently pro-Israel."

== Personal life ==
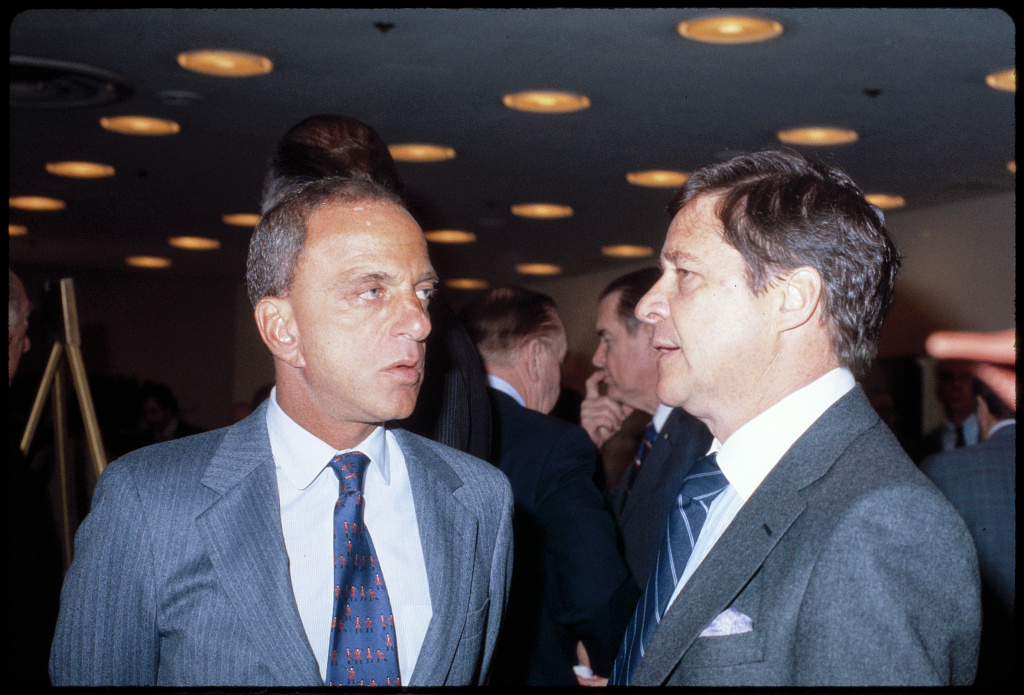
Cohn (left) as a political aide at the Steinbrenner event in 1980

Cohn dated Barbara Walters in college and remained friends with her. SI Newhouse, heir to the Condé Nast publishing empire, was Cohn's classmate at Horace Mann, and they remained lifelong friends. Cohn described Generoso Pope as "a second father". Cohn exchanged Christmas gifts with FBI director J. Edgar Hoover; they attended parties with their mutual friend, Lewis Rosenstiel, founder of liquor company Schenley Industries. Cohn referred to Donald Trump as his best friend. Cohn told journalists that Trump phoned him 15 to 20 times a day and according to Christine Seymour, his long-time switchboard operator, Trump was the last person to speak to Cohn on the phone before he died in 1986.

Cohn had many influential social contacts. According to Seymour, he had frequent phone calls with Nancy Reagan, and former CIA director William Casey "called Roy almost daily during [Reagan's] 1st election." Both Casey and Cohn were reportedly close with Craig J. Spence, an influential Republican lobbyist. He was a friend of Republican strategist Roger Stone whom he worked with on the Reagan Campaign and reportedly hosted a birthday party for Stone. Cohn met Alan Dershowitz when they worked together on the Claus von Bülow case and praised Dershowitz's support for Israel. Cohn was also friends with Estée Lauder, William F. Buckley Jr., and New York City mayor Abraham Beame.

=== Sexuality ===
When Cohn recruited G. David Schine as chief consultant to the McCarthy staff, speculation arose that Schine and Cohn had a sexual relationship. Schine's chauffeur later volunteered to testify that he had seen the two "engaged in homosexual acts" in the back of his limousine, though there was no evidence that Schine ever had any romantic feelings for Cohn. During this period, Schine dated the actress Piper Laurie, and he eventually married Hillevi Rombin, a former Miss Universe, with whom he had six children. During the Army–McCarthy hearings, Cohn denied having any "special interest" in Schine or being bound to him "closer than to the ordinary friend". Joseph Welch, the Army's attorney in the hearings, made an apparent reference to Cohn's homosexuality. After asking a witness, at McCarthy's request, if a photo entered as evidence "came from a pixie", Welch defined "pixie" as "a close relative of a fairy". Pixie was the brand-name of a popular inexpensive amateur camera of the era, while "fairy" is a derogatory term for a homosexual man. The people at the hearing recognized the implication and found it amusing; Cohn later called the remark "malicious", "wicked", and "indecent".

The young Cohn also attached himself to several older powerful men who, in return, provided Cohn with assistance. One of them may have been New York's Cardinal Francis Spellman, whose own alleged homosexuality has been a subject of controversy in the Catholic Church. Although Cohn always denied his homosexuality in public, he had a few known boyfriends over the course of his life, including his assistant Russell Eldridge, who died from AIDS in 1984, and Peter Fraser, Cohn's partner for the last two years of his life, who was 30 years his junior. Speculation about Cohn's sexuality intensified following his death from AIDS in 1986. In a 2008 article published in The New Yorker, Jeffrey Toobin quotes Cohn associate Roger Stone: "Roy was not gay. He was a man who liked having sex with men. Gays were weak, effeminate. He always seemed to have these young blond boys around. It just wasn't discussed. He was interested in power and access."

=== Sexual blackmail allegations ===
Some of Cohn's former clients, including Bill Bonanno, son of Joseph Bonanno, credit him with having compromising photographs of former FBI director J. Edgar Hoover. Because Hoover knew the pictures existed, Cohn told Bonanno, Hoover feared being blackmailed. Other organized crime figures have corroborated these allegations.

== Reputation ==
In 1978, Ken Auletta wrote in an Esquire profile of Cohn: "He fights his cases as if they were his own. It is war. If he feels his adversary has been unfair, it is war to the death. No white flags. No Mr. Nice Guy. Prospective clients who want to kill their husband, torture a business partner, break the government's legs, hire Roy Cohn. He is a legal executioner—the toughest, meanest, loyalest, vilest, and one of the most brilliant lawyers in America."

In a New York Times column about Matt Tyrnauer's film Where's My Roy Cohn?, Maureen Dowd wrote, "Roy Cohn understood the political value of wrapping himself in the flag. He made good copy. He knew how to manipulate the press and dictate stories to the New York tabloids. He surrounded himself with gorgeous women. There was always something of a nefarious nature going on. He was like a caged animal who would go after you the minute the cage door was opened."

Several people have asserted that Cohn had considerable influence on the presidency of Donald Trump. Ivy Meeropol, director of Bully, Coward, Victim: The Story of Roy Cohn, said "Cohn really paved the way for Trump and set him up with the right people, introduced him to Paul Manafort and Roger Stone—the people who helped him get to the White House."

Vanity Fair's Marie Brenner wrote in an article about Cohn's mentorship of Trump: "Cohn—possessed of a keen intellect, unlike Trump—could keep a jury spellbound. When he was indicted for bribery, in 1969, his lawyer suffered a heart attack near the end of the trial. Cohn deftly stepped in and did a seven-hour closing argument—never once referring to a notepad.... When Cohn spoke, he would fix you with a hypnotic stare. His eyes were the palest blue, all the more startling because they appeared to protrude from the sides of his head. While Al Pacino's version of Cohn (in Mike Nichols's 2003 HBO adaptation of Tony Kushner's Angels in America) captured Cohn's intensity, it failed to convey his child-like yearning to be liked." A portion of Cohn's personal papers is owned by the R.E.M. singer Michael Stipe. Bird and Goldmark drew on the collection for American Scoundrel, including sworn testimony Cohn gave in 1974 in which he said he had lost millions of dollars on the stock market, a claim contradicted by an FBI memorandum.

== Media portrayals ==
=== Theatre ===
Cohn inspired several fictional portrayals after his death. Probably the best known is in Tony Kushner's Angels in America (1991), which portrays Cohn as a closeted, power-hungry hypocrite haunted by the ghost of Ethel Rosenberg as he denies dying of AIDS. In the initial Broadway production, the role was played by Ron Leibman; in the HBO miniseries (2003), Cohn is played by Al Pacino; and in the 2010 Off-Broadway revival by the Signature Theatre Company in Manhattan, the role was reprised by Frank Wood. Nathan Lane played Cohn in the 2017 Royal National Theatre production and the 2018 Broadway production. Cohn is also a character in Kushner's one-act play, G. David Schine in Hell (1996). In the early 1990s, Cohn was one of two subjects of Ron Vawter's one-man show Roy Cohn/Jack Smith; his part was written by Gary Indiana.

=== Cinema, music, and television ===
Cohn had been played numerous times on both film and television. Cinematic portrayals include the following:

Year	Actor	Project	Notes	Ref.
1977	George Wyner	Tail Gunner Joe	NBC television film	
1985	Joe Pantoliano	Robert Kennedy and His Times	CBS miniseries	
1992	James Woods	Citizen Cohn	HBO television film	
2003	Al Pacino	Angels in America	HBO miniseries	
2023	Will Brill	Fellow Travelers	Showtime miniseries	
2024	Jeremy Strong	The Apprentice	Film	

Cohn was the subject of two 2019 documentaries: Bully, Coward, Victim: The Story of Roy Cohn, directed by Ivy Meeropol (a documentary filmmaker and granddaughter of Julius and Ethel Rosenberg) and Matt Tyrnauer's Where's My Roy Cohn? David Moreland appears as Cohn in The X-Files episode "Travelers" (1998). Roland Blum, played by Michael Sheen, is a dishonest lawyer inspired by Cohn, who appears in "The One Inspired by Roy Cohn", Season 3, Episode 2 of The Good Fight. Cohn and The Rosenbergs are name checked in the Billy Joel song "We Didn't Start the Fire". The Apprentice is a 2024 independent biographical drama film that examines Trump's career as a real estate businessman in New York City in the 1970s and 1980s, including his relationship with Roy Cohn portraying himself as Trump's attorney and mentor; the film was nominated for two Academy Awards, including for Jeremy Strong's portrayal of Cohn. The film explores their friendship while Cohn is shown leading an actively gay lifestyle in New York City while forming a closer business relationship with Trump.

== Bibliography ==
- Cohn, Roy (1954). Only a Miracle Can Save America from the Red Conspiracy. Wanderer Printing Co.
- Cohn, Roy (1968). McCarthy. New American Library. ISBN 978-1125326596.
- Cohn, Roy (1972). A Fool for a Client: My Struggle Against the Power of a Public Prosecutor. Dell Publishing. ISBN 978-0-440-02667-9.
- Cohn, Roy (1977). McCarthy: The Answer to 'Tail Gunner Joe'. Manor Books. ISBN 978-0-532-22106-7.
- Cohn, Roy (1981). How to Stand Up for Your Rights and Win!. Devin-Adair Publishers. ISBN 978-0-8159-5723-2.
- Cohn, Roy (1982). 'Outlaws of Amerika' The Weather Underground. Western Goals.
- Cohn, Roy (1986). Roy Cohn on Divorce: Words to the Wise and Not So Wise. Random House. ISBN 978-0-394-54383-3.
- Bird, Kai; Goldmark, Susan (2026). American Scoundrel: Roy Cohn's Dark Journey from Joe McCarthy to Donald Trump. Charles Scribner's Sons. ISBN 978-1668031575.
