= Where's My Roy Cohn? =

2019 documentary film, directed by Matt Tyrnauer

- Film poster
- Directed by: Matt Tyrnauer
- Produced by: Matt Tyrnauer; Corey Reeser; Marie Brenner; Joyce Deep; Andrea Lewis
- Starring: Roy Cohn
- Edited by: Andrea Lewis
- Music by: Lorne Balfe
- Production companies: Altimeter Films; Concordia Studio; Wavelength Productions; The Fertel Foundation
- Distributed by: Sony Pictures Classics
- Release dates: 25 January 2019 (Sundance); 20 September 2019 (United States)
- Running time: 97 minutes
- Country: United States
- Language: English
- Box office: $721,161

Where's My Roy Cohn? is a 2019 American documentary film, directed by Matt Tyrnauer, and produced by Tyrnauer, Marie Brenner, Corey Reeser, Joyce Deep, and Andrea Lewis. The film stars American lawyer Roy Cohn as himself, alongside Ken Auletta, Anne Roiphe, Roger Stone, Donald Trump, and Barbara Walters. The title is reported to be a quote from President Donald Trump, as he discussed Attorney General Jeff Sessions's recusal from the Mueller Investigation.

== Plot ==
The film looks into New York lawyer Roy Cohn whose career ranged from Senator Joseph McCarthy's chief counsel in the Second Red Scare to Former President Donald Trump's personal attorney.

In 1951, Cohn is a 24-year-old legal assistant at the office of United States Attorney General J. Howard McGrath at the Justice Department. The "Communist menace" according to one of the commentators was preoccupying the public in the 1950s. Cohn serves on the prosecution team in the trial of Julius and Ethel Rosenberg. The commentators accuse judge Irving Kaufman of judicial misconduct.

Cohn graduates from Columbia Law School at the age of 20; he is admitted to the New York State Bar Association in 1948—at the age of 21.

In the 1940s and 1950s, being gay was widely seen a negative trait; people in positions of power in government weren't permitted to be homosexual. Cohn served as legal counsel during the Lavender scare in the 1950s. The commentators claim that there was a "romantic crush" between David Schine and Cohn. Since being gay was a pejorative in the 1950s, the opposing counsel Joseph N. Welch in the Army–McCarthy hearings made many homophobic remarks against Cohn.

=== After 1955 ===
Cohn develops close ties with Cardinal Francis Spellman in New York. Cohn's great uncle was a founder of the Lionel, LLC train company.

Cohn was romantically tied to Barbara Walters for a while.

=== 1970s ===
Organized crime figures Carmine Galante and Anthony Salerno hire Cohn as their attorney.

=== 1980s ===
Donald Trump hires Cohn as his attorney. They first meet at the Le Club in Manhattan when Trump is 23 years old.

In interviews with Mike Wallace and Larry King, Cohn repeatedly and expressly states that he isn't gay; furthermore, he states that he doesn't have AIDS. The commentators say that Cohn had developed HIV-associated neurocognitive disorder shortly before dying.

== Cast ==
- Roy Cohn
- Ken Auletta
- Anne Roiphe
- Roger Stone
- Donald Trump
- Barbara Walters

== Reception ==
On the review aggregator Rotten Tomatoes, the film holds an approval rating of 87%, based on 82 reviews, with an average rating of 7.1/10. The website's consensus reads, "It's blunt rather than balanced, but Where's My Roy Cohn? does what it sets out to do, offering a disquieting summary of its subject's life and legacy." Metacritic, which uses a weighted average, assigned the film a score of 70 out of 100, based on 26 critics, indicating "Generally favorable reviews".

Leah Greenblatt of Entertainment Weekly wrote, "Tyrnauer smartly doesn't overplay the symbolism of their relationship, or work too hard to connect the dots; it's all there to take or leave in the film's shrewd, illuminating exploration of a man whose influence, for better or worse, may have far outdone even his wildest dreams". David Klion of The New Republic wrote, "As a portrait of Cohn, the documentary is riveting". Justin Chang of the Los Angeles Times wrote, "The movie can't fully disguise its glee as it lingers over the particulars of Cohn's death — or, for that matter, its all-too-convincing lament that his spirit is still alive and well". Brian Lowry of CNN wrote, "Where's My Roy Cohn? is by no means a flattering portrait; rather, the film portrays Cohn as being emblematic of everything that's wrong with politics, class disparity and the current toxic political environment".

Katherine Steinbach of Nonfics wrote, "Matt Tyrnauer's scintillating, gossipy, heavy-handed documentary Where's My Roy Cohn? delves into Cohn's contradictions without much illumination". Armond White of the National Review wrote, "Where's My Roy Cohn? typifies the "Gotcha" doc, a genre of the Fake News era that ignores objectivity and fairness in order to press politicized righteousness". Charles Bramesco of The A.V. Club wrote, "Anyone with the vaguest consciousness of American political history doesn't need 97 minutes to learn that this dead-eyed ethical vacuum was a bad person, or even the depth of his badness".
