= The Reagans (miniseries) =

Television documentary

- Genre: Documentary
- Directed by: Matt Tyrnauer
- Original language: English

Original release
- Network: Showtime
- Release: November 15 – December 6, 2020

The Reagans is a 2020 American television documentary miniseries about former U.S. President Ronald Reagan and First Lady Nancy Reagan. The four-part series was directed by Matt Tyrnauer and aired on Showtime starting on November 15, 2020. The series received positive reviews from critics, who praised the series for its coverage of the Reagan presidency, but stated that it could have provided more in-depth coverage.

== Episodes ==
No.	Title	Directed by	Written by	Original release date
1	"The Hollywood Myth Machine"	Matt Tyrnauer	Unknown	November 15, 2020
The episode follows Ronald Reagan's early life and Hollywood career, his marriage to Jane Wyman and later to Nancy Davis, and his shift from the Democratic Party to the Republican Party during the 1960s and the civil rights movement. Even though Ronald Reagan doesn't become a professional American football player that he had hoped, he portrays George Gipp in the 1940 movie Knute Rockne, All American which makes him nationally famous. Ron Reagan says that the "WPA was a big lifeline" for Ronald Reagan's parents. As a result, Ronald Reagan's parents were affiliated with liberals. During World War II, Ronald Reagan made war propaganda movies under Jack Warner. After the divorce from Jane Wyman, director Mervyn LeRoy matches Ronald Reagan with Nancy Reagan. His contract to host General Electric Theater netted him $125,000 (equivalent to $1,504,000 in 2025) annually in addition to perquisites such as a 1950s-modern fully electrified mansion. MCA Inc. was the show's producer. Reagan becomes Goldwater surrogate in the 1964 presidential election. Reagan outlines his vision for Republicans in "A Time for Choosing" speech.: Guests: Ron Reagan; George Shultz, Lou Cannon, Maya Wiley, James Baker, Grover Norquist, Ed Rollins.; Archival footage: Henry Salvatori.
2	"The Right Turn"	Matt Tyrnauer	Unknown	November 22, 2020
The episode discusses Reagan's campaign for and career as Governor of California and his 1980 presidential campaign, including his use of racist dogwhistles to win votes. Nancy's role in influencing the Reagans' public image is also covered. People's Park (Berkeley) protests in 1969 are discussed.
3	"The Great Undoing"	Matt Tyrnauer	Unknown	November 29, 2020
The episode covers Reagan's first term as President, including his undoing of the New Deal and Great Society, the war on drugs and the implementation of Reaganomics, which results in economic hardship for the lower classes and a widening gap in wealth between the poor and the rich. It also explores how the Reagans' public images suffer during this time of economic hardship.
4	"In the Stars"	Matt Tyrnauer	Unknown	December 6, 2020
The episode covers Reagan's 1984 re-election campaign and his second term as President, including Nancy's reliance on astrologer Joan Quigley for advice, his administration's response to the AIDS crisis, the Iran–Contra affair and its impact on his administration, and his role in contributing to the end of the Cold War, such as his meetings with Mikhail Gorbachev and his famous "Tear down this wall!" speech.

== Production ==
In a November 2020 interview with The Hollywood Reporter, director Matt Tyrnauer stated that the series would "take a fresh look" at the presidency of Ronald Reagan, describing Reagan's legacy as "a brilliantly confected myth". He added: "The real Ronald and Nancy Reagan are virtually unknown ... They carefully constructed their myth, and they acted it out." Tyrnauer had also stated in an earlier interview: "The reason I wanted to make this was to show how Reagan in many ways paved the way for Trump — and the Republican Party that has now fallen into Trump’s hands".

In a December 2020 interview with Los Angeles magazine, Tyrnauer said: "For years, I’ve thought that the Reagans were under-examined, and were so brilliant at creating a mythology around themselves and tending to that image and shaping it, and really editing their own story", and added: "There was something about that era that, as a kid in Southern California, I just remember being somewhat scarring, with the hangover of the harsh 1960s gubernatorial years ... The real Reagan, I think, was more apparent to me from an early age."

The series includes interviews with three members of the Reagan administration, James Baker (Chief of Staff), George Shultz (Secretary of State) and Colin Powell (National Security Adviser), as well as Ronald and Nancy Reagan's son Ron, Reagan biographer Lou Cannon, National Institute of Allergy and Infectious Diseases (NIAID) director Anthony Fauci and journalist Lesley Stahl.

Showtime released the trailer for the series on October 22, 2020, hours before the final 2020 presidential debate.

== Reception ==
The series received positive reviews from critics. It holds an approval rating of 83% on review aggregator Rotten Tomatoes based on 12 reviews, with an average rating of 7/10. The critics' consensus states: "It could stand to dig deeper, but The Reagans is a sturdy primer on a controversial first family that acts as a staunch reminder of the long-term impacts of drastic policy changes." The series holds a score of 66 on Metacritic based on 6 reviews, indicating "Generally favorable reviews".

Writing for IndieWire, Steve Greene gave the series a grade of B, saying that it "has effectively made the case that Ronald Reagan was something of an alchemist for American conservative thought, being wholly shaped by his movement's predecessors and then becoming a decades-long standard-bearer". He described it as a "compelling overview", but stated: "The simmering idea that Nancy was the guiding hand behind their ascent pops up repeatedly but never gets more than a passing consideration." Dorothy Rabinowitz of The Wall Street Journal said that "The testimony—from journalists, academics, sociologists, historians—is steeped in acid, especially about matters like the Reagan administration's passion for cutting social services." She concluded: "along with all its charges, this richly compelling series gives Reagan his due for achievements." Brad Newsome, writing for The Sydney Morning Herald, said that the series "provides plenty of fascinating insights into how the Republican Party – and by extension the entire United States – has come to be how it is today."

Mike Hale, writing for The New York Times, described the series as "a consistently revisionist enterprise, resting on the premise that Ronald Reagan has been treated far too well by history — that he's seen today as an exemplary president", and noted that the series provided many parallels between the Reagan presidency and the Trump presidency. He added: "While the documentary also gives a detailed portrait of Reagan as a fantasist who believed in and embodied a mythical American ideal, it could do a more comprehensive job of showing how race, nostalgia and American exceptionalism were inextricably woven together in his politics."

Melanie McFarland, writing for the progressive website Salon, was more critical of the series, saying that it "doesn't adequately dig into who Ron and Nancy were or tell us much of anything we don't already know about them within its four hours" and adding that the series "isn't terrible, but merely serviceable – not particularly flattering, but not all that enlightening either." She concluded: "It's a shame that four hours of "The Reagans" doesn't do a better job of helping us to better understand what his part in reshaping America back then implies about our future."

Inkoo Kang, writing for The Hollywood Reporter, said that Tyrnauer "succeeds in illustrating familiar concepts like the Southern strategy and racial dogwhistles, but his criticisms of Reagan's presidency never quite cohere into definitive (let alone fresh) "take" on the conservative icon. … There's no meaningful contextualization of Reagan among other presidents, nor much about his political legacy." Kang concluded: "Tyrnauer lets his interviewees make provocative assertions about the marriage — that Reagan wouldn't have become the politician that he was without his Lady Macbeth, and that she had more influence over policy after the onset of his dementia — without the elaboration needed to flesh out those believable but detail-demanding claims. Unfortunately, that's of a piece with the disappointing shallowness of the rest of the doc, which drifts instead of diving in."

Alvin S. Felzenberg, writing for the conservative magazine National Review, said that the series "is neither objective history nor a fair-minded attempt to review past controversies through the perspective of the present", and wrote: "Instead of hearing from people offering more than a point of view and allowing them to debate issues, the series’ creators rely on commentary from familiar regulars on MSNBC, who offer similar commentaries as they do regularly elsewhere."
