= Lorne Balfe =

Scottish composer (born 1976)

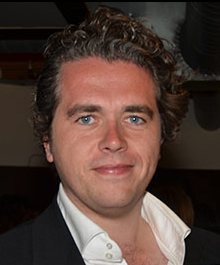
- Balfe in 2007

Background information
- Also known as: Oswin Mackintosh
- Born: 23 February 1976 (age 50); Inverness, Scotland, UK
- Genres: Film score; video game score; jazz; electronic; new-age; ambient; rock; alternative rock; electronic rock; synthwave; EDM
- Occupations: Composer; music producer
- Instruments: Piano; keyboards; synthesiser; guitar
- Years active: 1999–present
- Website: Official website

Lorne Balfe (born 23 February 1976) is a British Scottish composer and music producer, known for his work scoring film, television, and video games.

== Life and career ==
Balfe was born in Inverness, Scotland, UK. He went to Fettes College in Edinburgh, where he had a music scholarship.

A veteran of Hans Zimmer's Remote Control Productions, Balfe's scoring credits include the films Terminator Genisys, 13 Hours: The Secret Soldiers of Benghazi, The Lego Batman Movie, Mission: Impossible – Fallout and its sequel Mission: Impossible – Dead Reckoning Part One, Bad Boys for Life and its sequel Bad Boys: Ride or Die, Black Widow, Black Adam, Rumble, Dungeons & Dragons: Honor Among Thieves, Gran Turismo, Argylle, Beverly Hills Cop: Axel F, The Naked Gun, The Cat in the Hat, and three DreamWorks Animation films: Megamind, Penguins of Madagascar, and Home.

He has also scored the video games Assassin's Creed Revelations, Assassin's Creed III, Crysis 2, Skylanders, and Call of Duty: Modern Warfare 2. He has also scored the television series The Bible, Marcella, The Crown, and Genius, the latter for which he earned a nomination for a Primetime Emmy Award for Outstanding Original Main Title Theme Music.

He also frequently collaborates with the directors Michael Bay, Chris McKay, Christopher McQuarrie, Adil El Arbi and Bilall Fallah, Mikael Håfström and Jaume Collet-Serra; and violinists Charlie Bisharat and Eun-Mee Ahn.

He composed the new fanfare for Skydance Media transcribed as There's a World, There's A Moon. Balfe also composed the Annapurna Pictures deep note opening logo.

Balfe is also involved in The Game Awards as the conductor of the Game Awards Orchestra and the composer and arranger of several musical performances performed at the show. Since The Game Awards 2018, he has composed a medley of the themes of the six nominees for Game of the Year every year as a presentation of the award at the end of the show.

== Filmography ==
=== Feature films ===
Year	Title	Director(s)	Studio(s)	Notes
2004	Crazy in Love	Matt Routledge	United Home Entertainment; Studio Bangkok Entertainment Co. Ltd.	—N/a
2009	Crying with Laughter	Justin Molotnikov	Brit Films; Cinetic Rights Management	Nominated - World Soundtrack Award for Discovery of the Year
2010	Megamind	Tom McGrath	Paramount Pictures; DreamWorks Animation; PDI/DreamWorks	Composed with Hans Zimmer. First score for an animated film.
2011	The Dilemma	Ron Howard	Universal Pictures; Imagine Entertainment; Spyglass Entertainment	Composed with Hans Zimmer
2011	Ironclad	Jonathan English	Warner Bros. Pictures	—N/a
2012	The Sweeney	Nick Love	Entertainment One; Vertigo Films	—N/a
2013	The Frozen Ground	Scott Walker	Lionsgate	—N/a
2013	Red Wing	Will Wallace	Gravitas Ventures	—N/a
2013	Side by Side	Arthur Landon	Newtide Films; Nanny Films	—N/a
2013	Not Another Happy Ending	John McKay	Kaleidoscope Home Entertainment; Synchronicity Films Ltd. British Film Company	Composed with Dan Michaelson
2014	Son of God	Christopher Spencer	20th Century Fox; Lightworkers Media	Composed with Hans Zimmer & Lisa Gerrard
2014	Blackwood	Adam Wimpenny	Wildcard Films	—N/a
2014	Words with Gods	Guillermo Arriaga	—N/a	Segment: "God's Blood"
2014	Gloria	Christian Keller	Picturehouse	Nominated – Ariel Award for Best Original Score
2014	Penguins of Madagascar	Eric Darnell; Simon J. Smith	20th Century Fox; DreamWorks Animation; PDI/DreamWorks	First solo work on a DreamWorks film without Hans Zimmer
2015	Home	Tim Johnson	20th Century Fox; DreamWorks Animation	Composed with Stargate
2015	Bone in the Throat	Graham Henman	Upload Films; Hello and Company; Dignity Film Finance	—N/a
2015	Dough	John Goldschmidt	—N/a	—N/a
2015	Terminator Genisys	Alan Taylor	Paramount Pictures; Skydance Productions	Replaced Christophe Beck; Terminator themes by Brad Fiedel
2015	Sommeren '92	Kasper Barfoed	SF Film	Composed with Jeppe Kaas
2015	Captive	Jerry Jameson	Paramount Pictures	—N/a
2015	American Hero	Nick Love	Screen Media Films; Vertigo Films	—N/a
2016	13 Hours: The Secret Soldiers of Benghazi	Michael Bay	Paramount Pictures; 3 Arts Entertainment; Bay Films	—N/a
2016	War on Everyone	John Michael McDonagh	Icon Film Distribution	—N/a
2017	The Lego Batman Movie	Chris McKay	Warner Bros. Pictures; Warner Animation Group; DC Entertainment; RatPac Entertainment; Lego System A/S	—N/a
2017	Ghost in the Shell	Rupert Sanders	Paramount Pictures; DreamWorks Pictures	Composed with Clint Mansell
2017	Churchill	Jonathan Teplitzky	Lionsgate	—N/a
2017	The Florida Project	Sean Baker	A24; Cre Film; Freestyle Picture Company; Cinereach; June Pictures	Orchestral version of "Celebration" by Kool & The Gang
2017	Geostorm	Dean Devlin	Warner Bros. Pictures; Skydance Media	Replaced Pinar Toprak
2018	12 Strong	Nicolai Fuglsig	Warner Bros. Pictures; Lionsgate; Alcon Entertainment; Black Label Media; Jerry Bruckheimer Films; Torridon Films	—N/a
2018	The Hurricane Heist	Rob Cohen	Entertainment Studios	—N/a
2018	Pacific Rim Uprising	Steven S. DeKnight	Universal Pictures; Legendary Pictures; Double Dare You Productions	Replaced John Paesano
2018	Mission: Impossible – Fallout	Christopher McQuarrie	Paramount Pictures; Skydance Media; Bad Robot	Mission: Impossible themes by Lalo Schifrin
2019	Georgetown	Christoph Waltz	Vertical Entertainment; Paramount Pictures	—N/a
2019	Gemini Man	Ang Lee	Paramount Pictures; Skydance Media; Jerry Bruckheimer Films	Replaced Marco Beltrami
2019	Jungleland	Max Winkler	Vertical Entertainment; Romulus Entertainment; Scott Free Productions	—N/a
2019	Military Wives	Peter Cattaneo	Lionsgate	—N/a
2019	6 Underground	Michael Bay	Netflix; Skydance Media	—N/a
2020	Bad Boys for Life	Adil El Arbi; Bilall Fallah	Columbia Pictures; Don Simpson/Jerry Bruckheimer Films	Bad Boys themes by Mark Mancina
2020	Songbird	Adam Mason	STXfilms	—N/a
2021	Outside the Wire	Mikael Håfström	Netflix	—N/a
2021	The Tomorrow War	Chris McKay	Amazon Studios; Paramount Pictures; Skydance Media	—N/a
2021	Black Widow	Cate Shortland	Walt Disney Studios Motion Pictures; Marvel Studios	Replaced Alexandre Desplat
2021	The Forgiven	John Michael McDonagh	Focus Features	—N/a
2021	Silent Night	Camille Griffin	RLJE Films	—N/a
2021	Rumble	Hamish Grieve	Paramount Pictures; Paramount Animation; WWE Studios	—N/a
2022	Infinite Storm	Małgorzata Szumowska; Michał Englert	Bleecker Street	—N/a
2022	Ambulance	Michael Bay	Universal Pictures	Additional Music by Adam Price
2022	Top Gun: Maverick	Joseph Kosinski	Paramount Pictures; Don Simpson/Jerry Bruckheimer Films; Skydance Media	Score producer Composed by Harold Faltermeyer, Hans Zimmer and Lady Gaga
2022	Secret Headquarters	Henry Joost; Ariel Schulman	Paramount Pictures; Jerry Bruckheimer Films	—N/a
2022	Black Adam	Jaume Collet-Serra	Warner Bros. Pictures; New Line Cinema; DC Films; Seven Bucks Productions; FlynnPictureCo.	—N/a
2022	Ticket to Paradise	Ol Parker	Universal Pictures; Working Title Films; Smokehouse Pictures; Red Om Films	—N/a
2023	Dungeons & Dragons: Honor Among Thieves	Jonathan Goldstein; John Francis Daley	Paramount Pictures eOne	—N/a
2023	Tetris	Jon S. Baird	Apple TV+	—N/a
2023	Ghosted	Dexter Fletcher	Apple TV+	—N/a
2023	Gran Turismo	Neill Blomkamp	Columbia Pictures; PlayStation Productions; Trigger Street Productions; 2.0 Entertainment	Replaced Stephen Barton; Composed with Andrew Kawczynski
2023	Mission: Impossible – Dead Reckoning	Christopher McQuarrie	Paramount Pictures; Skydance Media	Mission: Impossible themes by Lalo Schifrin; Additional music by Max Aruj & Alfie Godfrey
2024	Argylle	Matthew Vaughn	Apple TV+ Universal Pictures	—N/a
2024	Bad Boys: Ride or Die	Adil El Arbi; Bilall Fallah	Columbia Pictures; Don Simpson/Jerry Bruckheimer Films; Westbrook Entertainment; 2.0 Entertainment	Bad Boys themes by Mark Mancina
2024	Beverly Hills Cop: Axel F	Mark Molloy	Netflix; Don Simpson/Jerry Bruckheimer Films	Beverly Hills Cop themes by Harold Faltermeyer
2024	Decoded	Chen Sicheng	China Media Capital; As One Productions; Beijing Happy Pictures	Composed with Kevin Riepl
2024	Slingshot	Mikael Håfström	Astral Pictures	—N/a
2024	The Cut	Sean Ellis	Tea Shop Productions; Amazing Owl	Composed with Stuart Michael Thomas
2024	Wallace & Gromit: Vengeance Most Fowl	Nick Park; Merlin Crossingham	Netflix; Aardman Animations	Composed with Julian Nott
2024	Carry-On	Jaume Collet-Serra	Dylan Clark Productions; DreamWorks Pictures; Netflix (distributor)	—N/a
2025	Novocaine	Dan Berk; Robert Olsen	Paramount Pictures; Infrared Pictures	Composed with Andrew Kawczynski
2025	The Woman in the Yard	Jaume Collet-Serra	Blumhouse Productions; Homegrown Pictures; Ombra Films; Universal Pictures (distributor)	—N/a
2025	The Naked Gun	Akiva Schaffer	Paramount Pictures; Fuzzy Door Productions	Replaced Joel McNeely
2026	7 Dogs	Adil El Arbi; Bilall Fallah	General Entertainment Authority; Sela	Only film scored by Balfe to be produced in Saudi Arabia
2026	The Cat in the Hat	Alessandro Carloni; Erica Rivinoja	Warner Bros. Pictures; Warner Bros. Pictures Animation; Dr. Seuss Enterprises	—N/a

==== Additional music ====
Year	Title	Director(s)	Composer(s)	Notes
2002	666 – Traue keinem, mit dem du schläfst!	Rainer Matsutani	Henning Lohner	—N/a
2003	Mimic 3: Sentinel	J. T. Petty	Henning Lohner	—N/a
2004	Incident at Loch Ness	Zak Penn	Henning Lohner	—N/a
2004	Laura's Star	Piet De Rycker; Thilo Rothkirch	Hans Zimmer; Henning Lohner; Nick Glennie-Smith	—N/a
2005	Hellraiser: Deader	Rick Bota	Henning Lohner	—N/a
2005	BloodRayne	Uwe Boll	Henning Lohner	—N/a
2005	Santa's Slay	David Steiman	Henning Lohner	Uncredited
2005	Wallace & Gromit: The Curse of the Were-Rabbit	Steve Box; Nick Park	Julian Nott	—N/a
2006	The Da Vinci Code	Ron Howard	Hans Zimmer	—N/a
2006	Pirates of the Caribbean: Dead Man's Chest	Gore Verbinski	Hans Zimmer	—N/a
2006	The Killing of John Lennon	Andrew Piddington	Martin Kiszko; Makana	—N/a
2006	The Holiday	Nancy Meyers	Hans Zimmer	—N/a
2007	Pirates of the Caribbean: At World's End	Gore Verbinski	Hans Zimmer	—N/a
2007	Transformers	Michael Bay	Steve Jablonsky	—N/a
2007	The Simpsons Movie	David Silverman	Hans Zimmer	—N/a
2007	Bee Movie	Simon J. Smith Steve Hickner	Rupert Gregson-Williams	—N/a
2008	Iron Man	Jon Favreau	Ramin Djawadi	Also arranger
2008	The Dark Knight	Christopher Nolan	Hans Zimmer; James Newton Howard	—N/a
2008	Frost/Nixon	Ron Howard	Hans Zimmer	Also orchestrator
2008	Madagascar: Escape 2 Africa	Eric Darnell; Tom McGrath	Hans Zimmer	—N/a
2009	Angels & Demons	Ron Howard	Hans Zimmer	—N/a
2009	Transformers: Revenge of the Fallen	Michael Bay	Steve Jablonsky	—N/a
2009	Sherlock Holmes	Guy Ritchie	Hans Zimmer	Also score producer
2010	Inception	Christopher Nolan	Hans Zimmer	Also score producer
2011	Rango	Gore Verbinski	Hans Zimmer	Also score producer
2011	Kung Fu Panda 2	Jennifer Yuh Nelson	Hans Zimmer; John Powell	—N/a
2011	Sherlock Holmes: A Game of Shadows	Guy Ritchie	Hans Zimmer	Also score producer
2012	Madagascar 3: Europe's Most Wanted	Eric Darnell; Conrad Vernon; Tom McGrath	Hans Zimmer	—N/a
2012	The Dark Knight Rises	Christopher Nolan	Hans Zimmer	—N/a
2013	The Lone Ranger	Gore Verbinski	Hans Zimmer	—N/a
2013	Rush	Ron Howard	Hans Zimmer	—N/a
2013	Captain Phillips	Paul Greengrass	Henry Jackman	Uncredited
2016	Kung Fu Panda 3	Jennifer Yuh Nelson; Alessandro Carloni	Hans Zimmer	Also score producer
2017	Dunkirk	Christopher Nolan	Hans Zimmer	Also score producer
2019	Looking Up	Deng Chao	Steffen Thum	Also executive score producer
2019	Ad Astra	James Gray	Max Richter	—N/a

=== Documentary films ===
Year	Title	Director(s)	Notes
2013	Girl Rising	Richard Robbins	—N/a
2013	Salinger	Shane Salerno	—N/a
2014	Manny	Leon Gast; Ryan Moore	—N/a
2014	The Last Man on the Moon	Mark Craig	—N/a
2014	Pantani: The Accidental Death of a Cyclist	James Erskine	—N/a
2014	Above and Beyond	Roberta Grossman	—N/a
2016	Le Mans: 3D	James Erskine	—N/a
2016	The Fresco Fiasco	Victoria Wimpenny	—N/a
2018	Studio 54	Matt Tyrnauer	—N/a
2019	Where's My Roy Cohn?	Matt Tyrnauer	—N/a
2020	Rebuilding Paradise	Ron Howard	Composed With Hans Zimmer
2024	Carville: Winning Is Everything, Stupid!	Matt Tyrnauer	—N/a
2025	We Are Storror	Michael Bay	—N/a

=== Short films ===
Year	Title	Director(s)	Notes
2002	Cigarette	Oliver Moran	—N/a
2003	Loved, Alone	Indra Bhose	—N/a
2010	Uganda: Friends of the Gorilla	Rachel Layne McDonald	—N/a
2010	Sodales	Jessica Biel	—N/a
2011	When You Find Me	Bryce Dallas Howard	—N/a
2011	J.A.W.	Nate Parker	—N/a
2013	Evermore	Biz Stone	—N/a
2013	Making a Scene	Janusz Kamiński	—N/a
2013	The Championship Rounds	Daniel Stine	—N/a
2014	Almost Home	Todd Wilderman	—N/a
2015	Wasted Beauty	Martin Paves	—N/a
2016	Kung Fu Panda: Secrets of the Scroll	Rodolphe Guenoden	Composed with John Powell and Hans Zimmer
2016	Alibi	Cameron Burnett	—N/a
2017	Them	Nate James Williams	—N/a
2017	Rakka	Neill Blomkamp	Main composer
2017	Firebase	Neill Blomkamp	Main composer
2017	Zygote	Neill Blomkamp	Main composer
2017	Adam: The Mirror	Neill Blomkamp	Main composer
2017	Happy Birthday to Me	Michael Reilly	Composed with Max Aruj

=== Television ===
Year	Title	Notes
2004	Shoebox Zoo	
2005-06	Nova	Documentary series
2006-07	How to Look Good Naked	Documentary series
2007	The Science of Superstorms	Documentary series
2007	River City	Main theme by Hard Todd
2009	WWII in HD	Documentary series
2012	Restless	
2013	The Bible	Miniseries; Composed with Hans Zimmer & Lisa Gerrard
2014	The Driver	
2015	Sons of Liberty	Miniseries; Main theme composed by Hans Zimmer
2015	A.D. The Bible Continues	Miniseries; Composed with Hans Zimmer
2015	Saints & Strangers	Miniseries
2016	The Story of God with Morgan Freeman	Documentary series
2016-18	The Investigator: A British Crime Story	Documentary series
2016-18	Marcella	
2017	Le Mans: Racing Is Everything	Documentary series
2017	The Crown	Main theme composed by Hans Zimmer; Composed with Rupert Gregson-Williams
2017–2018	Genius	Main theme composed with Hans Zimmer Nominated - Primetime Emmy Award for Outstanding Original Main Title Theme Music
2018	The Cry	Miniseries
2019	This is Football	Documentary series
2019–2022	His Dark Materials	
2020	Pennyworth	
2021	Dopesick	Miniseries
2021	The Wheel of Time	Replaced David Buckley; soundtracks
2022–present	Sherwood	
2022	Man vs. Bee	
2022	Mayflies	
2023	Life on Our Planet	
2025	The Hack	Miniseries Composed with Joshua Pacey
2025	The War Between the Land and the Sea	Miniseries
2025	Man vs. Baby	
2026	The Dinosaurs	

=== Video games ===
Year	Title	Notes	Ref.
2009	Call of Duty: Modern Warfare 2	Composed with Hans Zimmer Nominated - BAFTA Award for Best Original Score; Nominated - IMFCA Award for Best Original Score for a Video Game or Interactive Media; Nominated - Interactive Achievement Award for Outstanding Achievement in Original Music Composition	
2011	Rango	—N/a	
2011	Crysis 2	Main theme composed by Hans Zimmer; Composed with Borislav Slavov, Hans Zimmer & Tilman Sillescu	
2011	Skylanders: Spyro's Adventure	Main theme composed by Hans Zimmer; Additional music by Andrew Kawczynski & Pete Adams	
2011	Assassin's Creed: Revelations	Cinematics and multiplayer music with Jesper Kyd Nominated - BAFTA Award for Best Original Music	
2012	Skylanders: Giants	—N/a	
2012	Assassin's Creed III	Nominated- BAFTA Award for Best Original Music	
2013	Beyond: Two Souls	Finished score due to the death of Normand Corbeil Nominated - BAFTA Award for Best Original Music; Nominated - IMFCA Award for Best Original Score for a Video Game or Interactive Media; Nominated - D.I.C.E. Award for Outstanding Achievement in Original Music Composition	
2013	Skylanders: Swap Force	—N/a	
2014	Skylanders: Trap Team	—N/a	
2015	Skylanders: SuperChargers	—N/a	
2015	Honor of Kings	Composed with Hans Zimmer, Duncan Watt & Jeff Broadbent	
2016	Skylanders: Imaginators	Stock Music from the Previous Skylanders Games only.	
2018	FIFA 19	Composed with Hans Zimmer	
2024	Dragon Age: The Veilguard	Composed with Hans Zimmer	
