= Matt Tyrnauer =

American film director

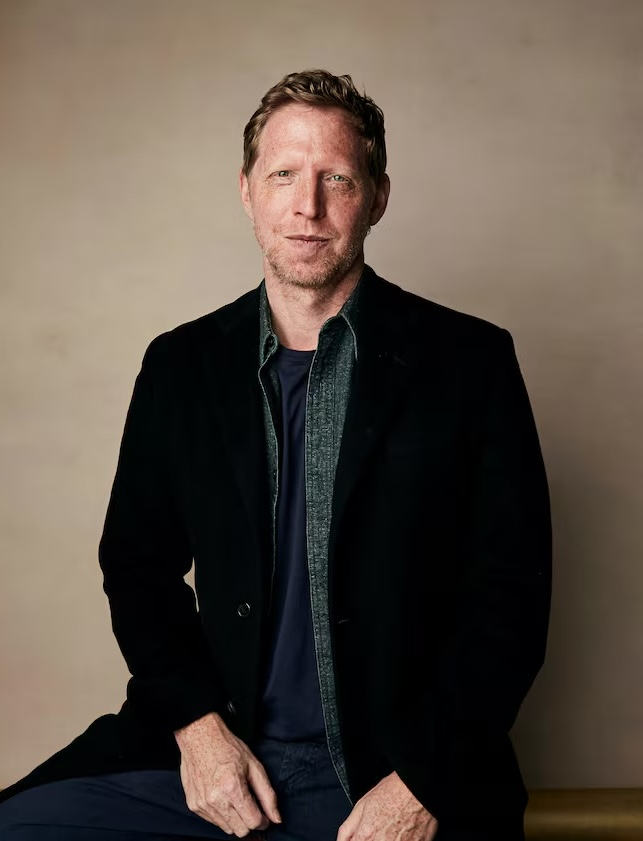
- Born: United States
- Occupations: Film director, journalist

Matt Tyrnauer is an American film director. He directed the documentary feature Valentino: The Last Emperor (2009), which was short listed for an Oscar nomination in 2010, Citizen Jane: Battle for the City (2016), the Emmy nominated, Scotty and the Secret History of Hollywood (2017), the 2018 documentary Studio 54 detailing New York's famed Studio 54 nightclub, Where's My Roy Cohn? (2019), and the Showtime four-part series, The Reagans (2020). Tyrnauer also developed and executive produced the docuseries Home, directing its Hong Kong episode, about the Gary Chang's Domestic Transformer home. The nine-part series premiered on Apple TV Plus in April 2020.

Tyrnauer subsequently directed Victoria's Secret: Angels and Demons (2022), the Emmy-nominated three-part documentary series about the rise and fall of the Victoria's Secret brand and its longtime CEO, Les Wexner; Carville: Winning Is Everything, Stupid! (2024), a documentary about political strategist James Carville; and Nobu(2024), a documentary about renowned chef Nobu Matsuhisa and his global culinary empire. His most recent film, Tribeca 25 (2026), chronicles how Robert De Niro and Jane Rosenthal founded the Tribeca Festival in the wake of 9/11 and follows the festival through its first 25 years.

Scotty and the Secret History of Hollywood is being adapted as a narrative film, with Tyrnauer producing, Luca Guadagnino directing and Seth Rogen and Evan Goldberg writing the script. Tyrnauer has been Editor-At-Large and Special Correspondent for Vanity Fair, where he has contributed many feature articles.

== Education ==
Tyrnauer was educated at the Crossroads School for Arts and Sciences, a college preparatory school in Santa Monica, California, followed by Wesleyan University.

== Career ==
Tyrnauer is also a writer. He first wrote for Spy magazine. Graydon Carter, the co-founder of Spy, later hired Tyrnauer to write for Vanity Fair. He currently writes for Vanity Fair, where he has written many feature stories. Tyrnauer's feature story, "Once Upon a Time in Beverly Hills," which appeared in the March 2011 issue of Vanity Fair, won the best magazine feature of 2011 from the Deadline Club. It is currently being adapted into a feature film for HBO. Additionally, he has written stories on Martha Stewart, Siegfried & Roy, Frank Gehry, Merv Griffin, and Gore Vidal. In 2007, art book publisher Taschen released a commemorative, signed book on fashion designer Valentino Garavani featuring interviews conducted by and archival material assembled by Tyrnauer.

In addition to Valentino: An Extraordinary Story, Tyrnauer also wrote the foreword or contributed to the books Bottega Veneta by Tomas Maier, Theater of Shopping by Alastair Gordon, the anthology Commune: Designed In California, and Design Commune. In 2016, Rizzoli published the monograph Francesco Vezzoli, on the work and career of the Italian artist. Tyrnauer contributed an essay to the book, analyzing Vezzoli's exhibition and short film, Trailer for the Remake of Gore Vidal's Caligula. Tyrnauer also appears in the film Best of Enemies (2015 film), about the Vidal–Buckley debates on ABC News in 1968. He was interviewed as a friend of Vidal's, as well as editor of a half dozen of Vidal's essays, which appeared in Vanity Fair, and Vidal's celebrated anthologies, Perpetual War for Perpetual Peace and Imperial America: Reflections on the United States of Amnesia, and The Selected Essays of Gore Vidal.

Tyrnauer's first feature Valentino: The Last Emperor premiered at the Venice Film Festival and the Toronto Film Festival, and won the Gold Hugo Award for Best Documentary at the 2008 Chicago International Film Festival and the Capri Documentary Award at the 2009 Capri Hollywood International Film Festival. His Citizen Jane: Battle for the City premiered at the 2016 Toronto International Film Festival; Scotty and the Secret History of Hollywood premiered at the 2017 Toronto International Film Festival. Studio 54 premiered at the Sundance Film Festival, as did Where's My Roy Cohn? Nobu and Carville: Winning Is Everything, Stupid both premiered at the Telluride Film Festival. His most recent film, Tribeca 25, showed an exclusive sneak peek at the Tribeca Festival before premiering on Netflix on 9/11 2026.

He is the founder of Tyrnauer Media, Inc.

Valentino: The Last Emperor, Citizen Jane, Scotty and the Secret History of Hollywood, Studio 54 and Where's my Roy Cohn? were each the top-grossing films at the specialty box office for the week of their theatrical premieres.

Tyrnauer has been the recipient of grants from the Ford, Rockefeller, and Knight Foundations, as well as the National Endowment for the Arts.

== Filmography ==
- Valentino: The Last Emperor (2009)
- Made In Milan (2015, short)
- Jean Nouvel: Reflections (2016, short)
- Citizen Jane: Battle for the City (2016)
- Scotty and the Secret History of Hollywood (2017, News and Documentary Emmy Award Nominee for Outstanding Historical Documentary)
- Studio 54 (2018)
- Where's My Roy Cohn? (2019)
- Home (2020)
- The Reagans (2020)
- Victoria's Secret: Angels and Demons (2022, News and Documentary Emmy Award Nominee for Outstanding Business and Economic Documentary)
- Carville: Winning Is Everything, Stupid! (2024, News and Documentary Emmy Award Nominee for Outstanding Government and Politics Documentary)
- Nobu (2024)
- Tribeca 25 (2026)
- Once Upon A Time In Beverly Hills (TBA)

== Personal life ==
Tyrnauer's step-father, Robert Van Scoyk, was a successful TV writer and producer, responsible for scripting some of the best-known programs on TV, such as Columbo, The Virginian and Murder, She Wrote.

He lives in Los Angeles, California.
