= Mission: Impossible – The Final Reckoning =

2025 American film by Christopher McQuarrie

- Theatrical release poster
- Directed by: Christopher McQuarrie
- Written by: Christopher McQuarrie; Erik Jendresen
- Based on: Mission: Impossible by Bruce Geller
- Produced by: Tom Cruise; Christopher McQuarrie
- Starring: Tom Cruise; Hayley Atwell; Ving Rhames; Simon Pegg; Esai Morales; Henry Czerny; Angela Bassett
- Cinematography: Fraser Taggart
- Edited by: Eddie Hamilton
- Music by: Max Aruj (Note: Mission: Impossible Theme composed by Lalo Schifrin); Alfie Godfrey
- Production companies: Paramount Pictures; Skydance; TC Productions
- Distributed by: Paramount Pictures
- Release dates: May 5, 2025 (Tokyo); May 23, 2025 (United States)
- Running time: 170 minutes
- Country: United States
- Language: English
- Budget: $300–400 million
- Box office: $598.8 million

Mission: Impossible – The Final Reckoning is a 2025 American action spy film directed by Christopher McQuarrie from a screenplay he co-wrote with Erik Jendresen. It is the sequel to Mission: Impossible – Dead Reckoning Part One (Note: Later retitled Mission: Impossible – Dead Reckoning) (2023) and the eighth installment in the Mission: Impossible film series. The ensemble cast includes Tom Cruise (in his final portrayal of Ethan Hunt), Hayley Atwell, Ving Rhames, Simon Pegg, Henry Czerny and Angela Bassett. In the film, Hunt and his IMF team continue their mission to prevent the Entity, a rogue artificial intelligence, from destroying all of humanity.

In January 2019, Cruise announced that the seventh and eighth Mission: Impossible films would be shot back-to-back with McQuarrie co-writing and directing. Plans for the eighth film changed in February 2021, with returning and new cast and crew members announced soon after, including Lorne Balfe, who composed the score for two other films in the series; Balfe was later replaced by Max Aruj and Alfie Godfrey. Principal photography began in March 2022, but was suspended in July 2023 due to the SAG-AFTRA strike. Production resumed in March 2024 and concluded in November, with filming locations including England, Malta, Norway and South Africa. The subtitle was changed from Dead Reckoning Part Two in November 2024. With an estimated production budget of $300–400 million, The Final Reckoning is one of the most expensive films ever made.

The Final Reckoning had its world premiere in Tokyo on May 5, 2025, was screened out of competition at the 78th Cannes Film Festival on May 14, and was theatrically released in the United States on May 23 by Paramount Pictures. The film received generally positive reviews from critics, who praised McQuarrie's direction, Cruise's performance, the supporting cast and the action sequences, although the runtime and the pacing of the second act were criticized. It grossed $598.8 million worldwide and was considered a box office disappointment due to its budget, though it performed slightly better overseas and was recorded as the largest opening weekend of the franchise at $79 million. (Note: Attributed to multiple references:) It was the final film co-produced by Paramount and Skydance before they merged in August 2025.

== Plot ==
Two months after retrieving the key to the source code for the malevolent artificial intelligence known as the Entity, (Note: As depicted in Mission: Impossible – Dead Reckoning Part One (2023)) rogue IMF agent Ethan Hunt receives a message from U.S. President Erika Sloane, informing Ethan that the Entity continues to seize control of global nuclear systems, aided by undercover doomsday cultists. Ethan is ordered to surrender the key, but he refuses and continues pursuing Gabriel, the Entity's former proxy, who was forsaken after failing to steal the key himself.

Ethan and fellow IMF agent Benji Dunn first visit their ill IMF hacker Luther Stickell in his off-grid laboratory beneath London, where he has finished developing the "Poison Pill" malware that can target the Entity. In Austria, the team breaks Gabriel's former lieutenant, Paris, out of prison and also recruits Jasper Briggs's partner, Theo Degas.

In London, Gabriel's men capture Ethan and IMF agent Grace. Gabriel orders Ethan to recover the "Podkova" module, developed from the Rabbit's Foot, (Note: As depicted in Mission: Impossible III (2006)) from the sunken Russian submarine Sevastopol, which would give him control over the Entity. However, with help from the team, Ethan and Grace escape. Contacting the Entity, Ethan is shown visions of a nuclear apocalypse. The Entity says Luther will die and demands access to a digital bunker in South Africa to survive.

Ethan tasks his team with getting the Sevastopol's coordinates and retrieving him after the dive. He races to save Luther, but Gabriel steals the Poison Pill and traps Luther with a time bomb. Luther sacrifices himself to minimize the blast while Ethan escapes, but is caught by Briggs, who is revealed to be the son of Jim Phelps, and is taken to Mount Weather Emergency Operations Center. With three days until the Entity takes over the remaining nuclear weapons control facilities and launches nuclear armageddon, Ethan convinces Sloane to let him locate the Sevastopol, against CIA director Eugene Kittridge's objections.

Grace, Benji, Paris and Degas travel to St. Matthew Island in the Bering Sea, home to a Cold War-era naval sonar array that detected the Sevastopol's sinking. They meet former CIA analyst William Donloe, who was exiled to the island after Ethan's break-in at CIA headquarters thirty years ago (Note: As depicted in Mission: Impossible (1996)) and coincidentally memorized the Sevastopol's coordinates. Russian special forces intercept them seeking the coordinates, though Grace and Donloe's wife, Tapeesa, escape by dog sled while the others fight off the soldiers as Donloe transmits the coordinates to Ethan.

Ethan joins the aircraft carrier USS George H. W. Bush in the northern Pacific Ocean and boards the submarine USS Ohio. After receiving the coordinates and barely surviving a doomsday assassin named Hagar, who had infiltrated the USS Ohio, Ethan uses an experimental diving suit to reach the Sevastopol and retrieve the Podkova as the wreck slides down the continental shelf. Narrowly escaping without his diving suit, Ethan is revived from decompression sickness by Grace using a portable decompression chamber. After reuniting with his team, Ethan plans to plug the Poison Pill into the Podkova, fooling the Entity into entering a physical drive instead of the bunker mainframe.

At the bunker, Gabriel ambushes the team with a timed nuclear device, demanding the Podkova, though they are interrupted by Kittridge and a team of agents seeking control of the Entity. During the gunfight, the bomb is activated and Benji is shot. Gabriel escapes with the Poison Pill, pursued by Ethan with the Podkova. Donloe, Tapeesa and Degas defuse the bomb while Paris, Grace and Benji prepare the mainframe to trap the Entity.

President Sloane refuses to order a preemptive nuclear strike, though a failed attack by a doomsday assassin allows the Entity time to take full control of the world's nuclear arsenal. After a lengthy chase in a pair of biplanes, Ethan climbs onto Gabriel's plane and retrieves the Poison Pill. While attempting to escape, Gabriel is killed hitting his groin and then his head on the plane's vertical stabilizer. Parachuting away, Ethan inserts the Poison Pill into the Podkova mid-air, allowing Grace to trap the Entity just before nuclear launch.

Upon landing, Ethan listens to a farewell message from Luther in the Poison Pill, which self-destructs afterward. He gives the destroyed Podkova to Kittridge, and Briggs makes amends with Ethan for exposing his father as a traitor. Reuniting in London's Trafalgar Square, Grace gives Ethan the drive with the Entity and the IMF team part ways.

== Cast ==
- Tom Cruise as Ethan Hunt: An IMF agent and leader of a team of operatives.
- Hayley Atwell as Grace: A former thief turned IMF agent and Ethan's ally.
- Ving Rhames as Luther Stickell: An IMF computer technician, one of Ethan's closest friends, and member of Ethan's team.
- Simon Pegg as Benji Dunn: An IMF technical field agent and a member of Ethan's team.
- Esai Morales as Gabriel: An assassin with ties to Ethan's past before the IMF, who previously acted as the Entity's liaison.
- Pom Klementieff as Paris: A French assassin who was betrayed by Gabriel and became Ethan's ally in order to kill Gabriel.
- Henry Czerny as Eugene Kittridge: The ex-director of the IMF in the first film who now is the director of the CIA from Dead Reckoning.
- Angela Bassett as Erika Sloane: The former CIA director, now President of the United States; Bassett returns from Fallout.
- Greg Tarzan Davis as Theo Degas: A U.S. Intelligence agent and Briggs' former partner who was assigned to track down Ethan and his team. He joins Ethan's team in this film.
- Holt McCallany as Serling Bernstein: The U.S. Secretary of Defense.
- Janet McTeer as Walters: The U.S. Secretary of State.
- Nick Offerman as General Sidney: A U.S. Army General and the Chairman of the Joint Chiefs of Staff.
- Hannah Waddingham as Rear Admiral Neely: USN, the commander of Carrier Strike Group 10.
- Tramell Tillman as Captain Jack Bledsoe: The USN commanding officer of the rescue submarine USS Ohio.
- Shea Whigham as Jasper Briggs / Jim Phelps Jr.: A U.S. Intelligence agent assigned to track down Ethan and his team, and the son of Ethan's former team leader who went rogue, Jim Phelps.
- Charles Parnell as Richards: The DNI and head of the NRO.
- Mark Gatiss as Angstrom: Head of the NSA.
- Rolf Saxon as William "Bill" Donloe: A CIA analyst last seen in the first film, and who has since been transferred to Alaska.
- Lucy Tulugarjuk as Tapeesa: Donloe's wife.
- Katy O'Brian as Kodiak: A U.S. Navy diver on board the submarine.
- Stephen Oyoung as Pills: A U.S. Navy diver on board the submarine.
- Tomas Paredes as Hagar: A U.S. Navy diver on board the submarine and a Doomsday cultist.
- Paul Bullion as Shirley: A U.S. Navy diver on board the submarine.
- Mariela Garriga as Marie: A woman from Ethan and Gabriel's past, seen in a brief flashback.
- Pasha D. Lychnikoff as Captain Koltsov: Captain of a Spetsnaz unit.
- Tommie Earl Jenkins as Colonel Burdick: U.S. Army colonel, General Sidney's executive assistant.
- Cary Elwes as Denlinger: The Director of National Intelligence in Dead Reckoning, seen in a brief flashback.
- Sydney Cole Alexander as Lieutenant Commander Bennet.

Additionally, through archival footage from previous films, Jon Voight, Michelle Monaghan, Rebecca Ferguson, Vanessa Kirby, Emilio Estevez, Ingeborga Dapkūnaitė, Marcin Dorociński, Ivan Ivashkin, Anthony Hopkins, Philip Seymour Hoffman, Laurence Fishburne, Jeremy Renner, Paula Patton, Maggie Q, Jean Reno, Dougray Scott, Michael Nyqvist, Emmanuelle Béart, Léa Seydoux, Kristoffer Joner, Keri Russell, Kristin Scott Thomas, Jens Hultén, Henry Cavill, Vanessa Redgrave, Liang Yang and Alec Baldwin all appear as their respective characters Jim Phelps, Julia Meade-Hunt, Ilsa Faust, Alanna "The White Widow" Mitsopolis, Jack Harmon, Hannah Williams, Sevastopol's Captain 1st rank, Sevastopol's second-in-command, Swanbeck, Owen Davian, Theodore Brassel, William Brandt, Jane Carter, Zhen Lei, Franz Krieger, Sean Ambrose, Dr. Kurt "Cobalt" Hendricks, Claire Phelps, Sabine Moreau, Nils Delbruuk, Lindsey Farris, Sarah Davies, Janik "Bone Doctor" Vinter, August "John Lark" Walker, Max Mitsopolis, the fake John Lark and Alan Hunley (Hoffman and Nyqvist appearing posthumously). Rob Delaney and Indira Varma, also uncredited, appear as the heads of JSOC and the DIA, respectively, via archival audio footage from Dead Reckoning. Director Christopher McQuarrie also makes a cameo appearance at the end of the film.

== Production ==
=== Development ===
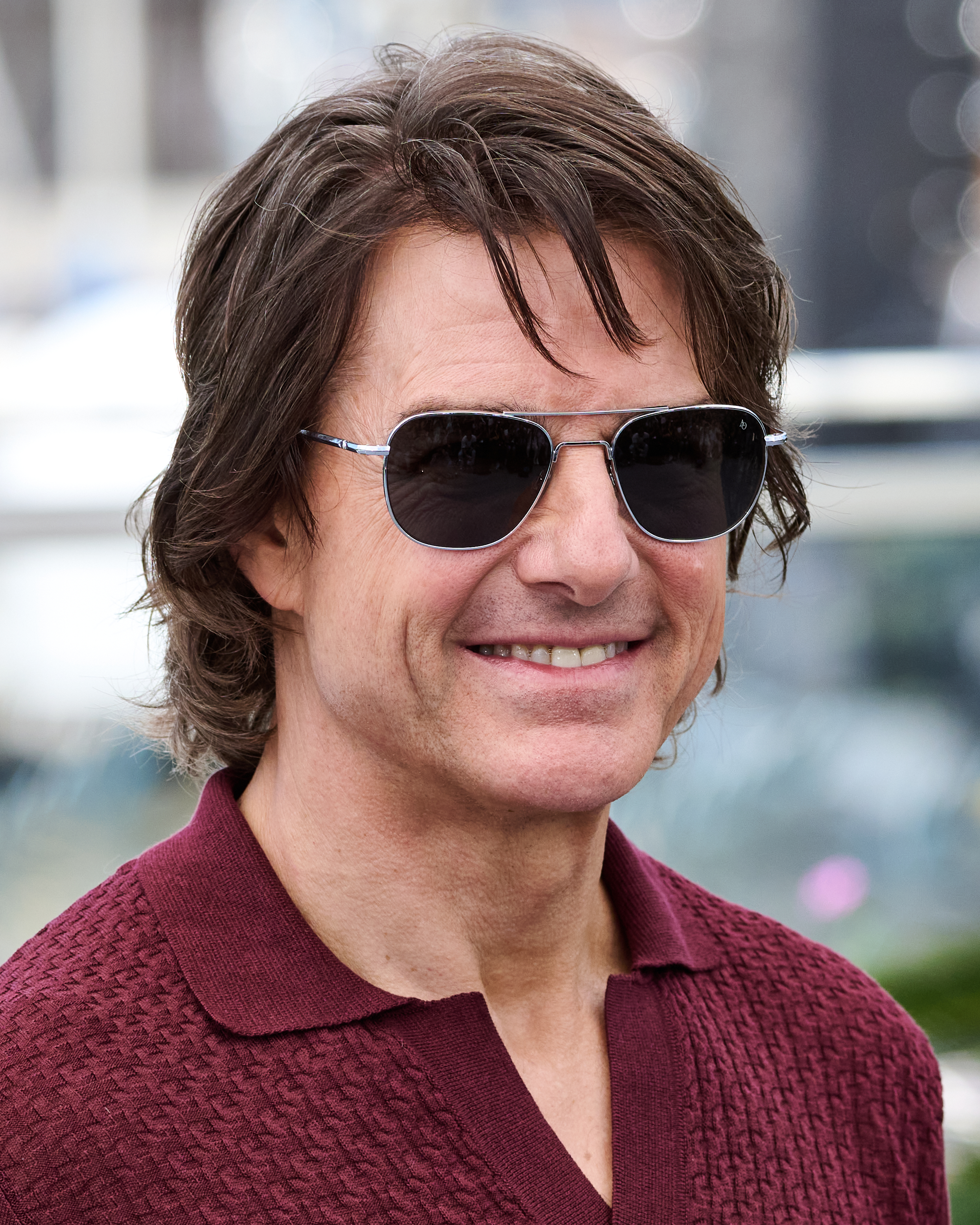
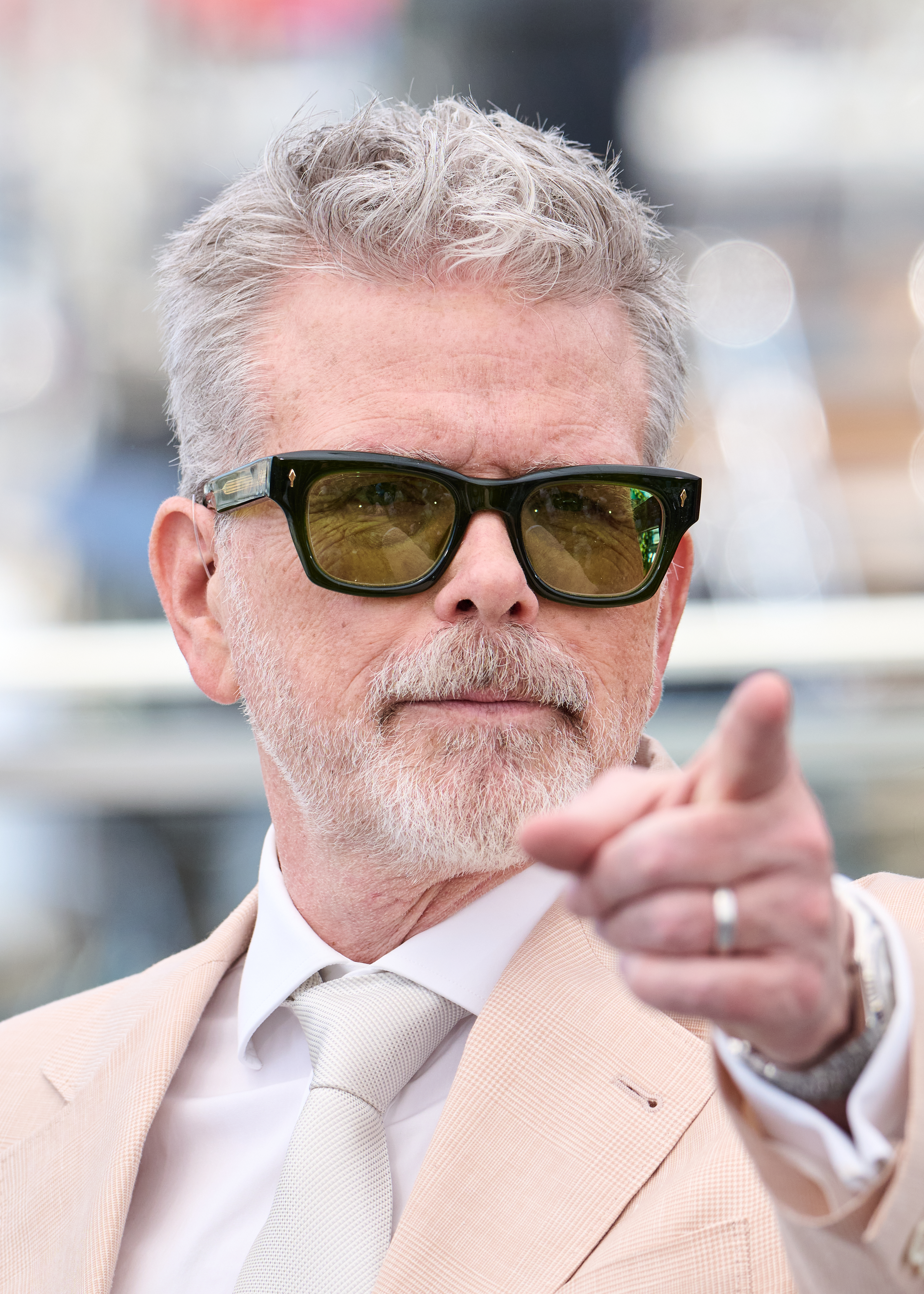
Tom Cruise (left) and Christopher McQuarrie (right) promoting the film at the 2025 Cannes Film Festival

On January 14, 2019, Tom Cruise revealed that the seventh and eighth Mission: Impossible films would be shot back-to-back with Christopher McQuarrie writing and directing both films for July 23, 2021 and August 5, 2022, releases. However, in February 2021, Deadline Hollywood revealed that Paramount had decided to no longer move forward with that plan.

=== Casting ===
In September 2019, Hayley Atwell and Pom Klementieff joined the cast of the eighth installment. In December, Simon Pegg confirmed his return for the film, while Shea Whigham was also cast. Nicholas Hoult joined the cast by January 2020, along with Henry Czerny, who reprised his role as Eugene Kittridge from Mission: Impossible – Dead Reckoning Part One and the first film. However, due to scheduling conflicts, Hoult was replaced by Esai Morales for both films. Vanessa Kirby, who first appeared in Fallout, revealed she was returning for both films, but did not appear in The Final Reckoning.

In July 2022, it was reported that Holt McCallany had joined the cast. In August 2022, it was announced that Nick Offerman and Janet McTeer were also added to the cast.

In March 2023, McQuarrie announced Hannah Waddingham, Lucy Tulugarjuk and Rolf Saxon's addition to the cast, the last of whom reprises his role from the first film. In March and April 2024, respectively, Katy O'Brian and Tramell Tillman joined the cast in then-undisclosed roles. In November 2024, it was announced that Angela Bassett would reprise her role as CIA director Erika Sloane.

=== Filming ===
In February 2021, Deadline Hollywood reported that the film would no longer be filmed back-to-back with Dead Reckoning Part One. By November, McQuarrie was in the process of rewriting the film's script. On March 23, 2022, The Hollywood Reporter reported the beginning of principal photography of the then-untitled Mission: Impossible 8. Filming took place in the UK at Longcross Studios and the Lake District. Other locations included Malta, Norway and South Africa. In December 2022, filming was finished in the UK. The crew then moved to Apulia in Italy to continue filming aboard the aircraft carrier USS George H. W. Bush. During the 2023 Writers Guild of America strike, production was thought to have been put on hold according to an interview with McQuarrie in the June 2023 issue of the Empire magazine. However, this was later announced to have been a misinterpretation of McQuarrie's statement and continued production was only waiting for the promotion of Part One to complete. Filming was officially suspended in July due to the 2023 SAG-AFTRA strike.

The film returned to production in March 2024, though in May, it encountered a delay due to a submarine malfunction. During filming in England, Cruise and Morales were observed performing stunts from an airborne biplane, with Cruise holding onto the wings of the open cockpit aircraft as it flew upside down, while the pilot wore a greenscreen suit so as to be digitally removed from the final shot. In July 2024, Simon Pegg revealed filming had concluded for his part, though the cast and crew were maintaining radio silence. By November 2024, production had concluded and the film was in post-production. The Hollywood Reporter reported that the budget had neared $400 million due to the production delays.

=== Post-production ===
Industrial Light & Magic returned from the seventh film to produce the visual effects, with Clear Angle Studios and Halon Entertainment as the additional vendors for lidar, cyber scanning and previsualization. In October 2023, Dead Reckoning Part Two was removed as the film's subtitle and the new subtitle was confirmed as The Final Reckoning on November 11, 2024.

== Music ==
Lorne Balfe was originally announced in May 2020 to be composing the film's score, after previously doing so for Mission: Impossible – Fallout (2018) and Mission: Impossible – Dead Reckoning Part One (2023), but it was later revealed in April 2025 that he would be replaced with Max Aruj and Alfie Godfrey. Aruj has previously provided additional music for Dead Reckoning and served as technical score assistant on Fallout. Both Aruj and Godfrey have contributed music to numerous projects scored by Balfe over the years. Cecile Tournesac was credited as the score producer and supervising music editor. The full album was released on May 23, 2025.

== Release ==
The Final Reckoning had its world premiere in Tokyo on May 5, 2025. It was screened at the 2025 Cannes Film Festival on May 14, 2025, prior to its scheduled theatrical release on May 23, by Paramount Pictures. It was previously set for release on August 5, 2022, but was delayed to November 4, 2022, July 7, 2023, June 28, 2024, and the final date in response to the 2023 SAG-AFTRA strike, taking the original release date of The SpongeBob Movie: Search for SquarePants. Due to delays caused by the COVID-19 pandemic and the 2023 Hollywood labor disputes, the budget reportedly increased to at least $400 million, placing it among the most expensive films ever made. Based on typical industry expectations, the film may need to earn around $1 billion worldwide to recoup its production costs. However, in addition to its box office, its performance on Paramount+ was also expected to be a significant factor in evaluating its overall success. The Final Reckoning was released theatrically in Australia, India, New Zealand, Philippines and South Korea on May 17, 2025, before releasing in the United Kingdom on May 21. It was released in 4DX, Dolby Cinema, IMAX, RPX, ScreenX and other premium large formats.

=== Home media ===
Mission: Impossible – The Final Reckoning was released on digital download on August 19, 2025, and was released on 4K Ultra HD Blu-ray, Blu-ray and DVD on October 14, 2025. The film began streaming on Paramount+ on December 4, 2025. On April 3, 2026, it started streaming on Prime Video.

== Reception ==
=== Box office ===
Mission: Impossible – The Final Reckoning grossed $197.4 million in the United States and Canada, and $401.4 million in other territories, for a worldwide total of $598.8 million. It was considered a box office disappointment, given its $300–400 million budget.

In the United States and Canada, The Final Reckoning was released alongside Lilo & Stitch, and was initially projected to gross $80–110 million over the four-day Memorial Day weekend. Final Reckoning earned $24.8 million on its opening day, which included $8.3 million from Thursday night previews, setting a new opening day record for the franchise. The film debuted to $64 million over its standard three-day weekend and reached $79 million across the four-day Memorial Day weekend, placing second behind Lilo & Stitch. Despite not topping the box office on its opening weekend, a first for the franchise, not counting Mission: Impossible – Ghost Protocol's limited release in IMAX and other large-format theaters in its first five days where it finished third, it contributed to the biggest Memorial Day weekend in domestic box office history, with all films combining for a record-breaking $334.5 million. (Note: Attributed to multiple references:) In its second weekend the film made $27.3 million (a drop of 57%), remaining in second ahead of Karate Kid: Legends. In its third weekend the film made $14.8 million, and it finished in third place behind Lilo & Stitch and Ballerina.

The Final Reckoning opened in 64 markets alongside the United States and Canada, earning $127 million on its opening weekend and with its biggest numbers coming from South Korea ($12.7 million), Japan ($11 million) and the United Kingdom ($10.7 million). The $31 million earned from IMAX screenings was the biggest of the franchise. It opened in China on June 2, topping the box office with a $25.6 million gross, with $4.9 million from IMAX screenings and is also IMAX's biggest opening weekend for a Hollywood film in China in 2025.

=== Critical response ===
Reviews for The Final Reckoning were generally positive, but subdued compared to the four previous critically acclaimed installments, (Note: Attributed to multiple references:) with several critics praising the action sequences but criticizing the exposition in the first hour. On the review aggregator website Rotten Tomatoes, 80% of 427 critics' reviews are positive, with an average rating of 6.8/10. The website's consensus reads: "Gargantuan in action, runtime, and scope, The Final Reckoning is a sentimental sendoff for Ethan Hunt that accomplishes its mission with a characteristic flair for the impossible." Metacritic, which uses a weighted average, assigned the film a score of 67 out of 100, based on 57 critics, indicating "generally favorable" reviews. Audiences polled by CinemaScore gave the film an average grade of "A–" on an A+ to F scale, while those surveyed by PostTrak gave it an 89% overall positive score, with 79% saying they would definitely recommend the film.

Peter Bradshaw of The Guardian rated the film five stars out of five, calling it a "wildly silly, wildly entertaining adventure which periodically gives us a greatest-hits flashback montage of the other seven films". In another positive review, Michael Phillips of the Chicago Tribune said the film was a "satisfying capper to an eight-film franchise" and praised the return of Rolf Saxon, writing, "He may not hang off a biplane, but the year's unlikeliest franchise MVP makes Final Reckoning something better than superhuman: human." Robbie Collin of The Telegraph wrote, "Even by the series' own now well-established standards, this widely presumed last entry in Tom Cruise's Mission: Impossible franchise is an awe-inspiringly bananas piece of work." Ann Hornaday of The Washington Post gave the film 3 out of 4 stars, writing it "stays true" to the franchise's "core tenets, even if it too often feels baggy and redundant", and particularly praised "a callback from the first film that strikes a particularly winning chord of humor and sentimentality".

Brian Tallerico of RogerEbert.com was more critical of the film, calling its first hour "unwieldy and truly clunky" and "the worst segment in the entire franchise", although he noted that the action sequences during the film's peaks were "enough to ignore everything wrong with the movie up to that point". Cary Darling of the Houston Chronicle described the film as a "disappointing installment" that felt "bloated and tired, despite the dizzying, high-flying stunt work at the film's climax". He also criticized its runtime, writing, "Just shy of three hours (the longest in the series), it takes a heck of a long time to achieve lift-off."

=== Accolades ===
Cruise set a Guinness World Record for most burning parachute jumps by an individual while filming one of the film's final stunts, where Cruise burned his first parachute doused in flammable liquid before opening his second parachute a total of sixteen times; an article about the stunt was published on the Guinness World Records' official website on June 5, 2025.

Award	Date of ceremony	Category	Recipient(s)	Result	Ref.
Actor Awards	March 1, 2026	Outstanding Action Performance by a Stunt Ensemble in a Motion Picture	Various (Note: Joel Adrian, Izaiah Aduhene, Ray Armstrong, Scott Armstrong, Oliver Bailey, Russell Balogh, Marco Bianco, Tamiko Brownlee, Kabelo Chalatsane, Lee Charles, David Cheung, Paul Clark, Jonathan Cohen, Lucy Cork, Campbell Dalziel, Sanda Damba, Wade Eastwood, Matthew Fraser-Dawson, Kyle Freemantle, Luke Gomes, Martin Gordon, Allan Hewitt, Theo Hill, Nick Homewood, Jack Jagodka, Igor Karpovich, Joe Kennard, Bogdan Kumshatsky, Mike Li, John Macdonald, Kai Martin, Stefan Mihalache, Alexis Naughton, Cali Nelle, Haruka Oshima, Tomas Paredes, Stevie Parker, Tilly Powell, Ralph Ridge, Tom Rodgers, Luke Scott, Jon Slayer, Mike Snow, Leos Stransky, Malachi Templeton, James Unsworth, Matthew Van Leeve, David Van Zeyl, Ruda Vrba, Martin Wilde, and Jahgo Williams)	Won	
Alliance of Women Film Journalists	December 31, 2025	Female Focus: Best Stunts Performance	Hayley Atwell	Nominated	
Alliance of Women Film Journalists	December 31, 2025	Female Focus: Best Stunts Performance	Pom Klementieff	Nominated	
American Cinematheque Tribute to the Crafts Awards	January 16, 2026	Stunts	Mission: Impossible – The Final Reckoning (Wade Eastwood)	Honored	
Art Directors Guild Awards	February 28, 2026	Contemporary Feature Film	Gary Freeman	Nominated	
Astra Film Awards	January 9, 2026	Best Action or Science Fiction Feature	Mission: Impossible – The Final Reckoning	Nominated	
Astra Film Awards	December 11, 2025	Best Stunts	Mission: Impossible – The Final Reckoning	Won	
Astra Film Awards	December 11, 2025	Best Stunt Coordinator	Wade Eastwood	Won	
Astra Film Awards	December 11, 2025	Best Second Unit Director	Wade Eastwood	Nominated	
Astra Midseason Movie Awards	July 3, 2025	Best Picture	Mission: Impossible – The Final Reckoning	Nominated	
Astra Midseason Movie Awards	July 3, 2025	Best Stunts	Mission: Impossible – The Final Reckoning	Won	
Austin Film Critics Association	December 18, 2025	Best Stunt Work	Mission: Impossible – The Final Reckoning	Won	
Chicago Film Critics Association	December 11, 2025	Best Use of Visual Effects	Mission: Impossible – The Final Reckoning	Nominated	
Chinese American Film Festival	November 7, 2025	Most Popular U.S. Film in China	Mission: Impossible – The Final Reckoning	Honored (Note: This award does not have a single winner, but recognizes multiple films.)	
Cinema Audio Society Awards	March 7, 2026	Motion Pictures – Live Action	Lloyd Dudley (production mixer); Chris Burdon and Mark Taylor (re-recording mixers); Chris Fogel (scoring mixer); Nick Roberts (ADR mixer); Adam Mendez (foley mixer)	Nominated	
Critics' Choice Awards	January 4, 2026	Best Visual Effects	Alex Wuttke, Ian Lowe, Jeff Sutherland and Kirstin Hall	Nominated	
Critics' Choice Awards	January 4, 2026	Best Stunt Design	Wade Eastwood	Won	
Critics' Choice Super Awards	August 7, 2025	Best Action Movie	Mission: Impossible – The Final Reckoning	Won	
Critics' Choice Super Awards	August 7, 2025	Best Actor in an Action Movie	Tom Cruise	Won	
Golden Globes	January 11, 2026	Cinematic and Box Office Achievement	Mission: Impossible – The Final Reckoning	Nominated	
Golden Reel Awards	March 8, 2026	Outstanding Achievement in Music Editing – Feature Motion Picture	Cécile Tournesac and Timeri Duplat	Nominated	
Golden Tomato Awards	January 13, 2026	Fan Favorite Movies	Mission: Impossible – The Final Reckoning	Nominated	
Golden Tomato Awards	January 13, 2026	Fan Favorite Action Movie	Mission: Impossible – The Final Reckoning	Nominated	
Golden Trailer Awards	May 29, 2025	Best Action TV Spot (Feature Film)	"Crackle" (Paramount Pictures / AV Squad)	Won	
Golden Trailer Awards	May 29, 2025	Best Original Score	"Certainty" (Paramount Pictures / AV Squad)	Won	
Golden Trailer Awards	May 29, 2025	Best Summer 2025 Blockbuster Trailer	"Certainty" (Paramount Pictures / AV Squad)	Nominated	
Houston Film Critics Society	January 20, 2026	Best Stunt Coordination Team	Mission: Impossible – The Final Reckoning	Won	
ICG Publicists Awards	March 13, 2026	Maxwell Weinberg Award for Motion Picture Publicity Campaign	Mission: Impossible – The Final Reckoning	Nominated	
International Film Music Critics Association	February 26, 2026	Best Original Score for an Action/Adventure Film	Mission: Impossible – The Final Reckoning (Max Aruj and Alfie Godfrey)	Nominated	
Japan Academy Film Prize	March 13, 2026	Excellent Foreign Work	Mission: Impossible – The Final Reckoning	Nominated	
Kansas City Film Critics Circle	December 21, 2025	Buster Keaton Award for the Best Stunt Ensemble Film	Mission: Impossible – The Final Reckoning	Won	
Las Vegas Film Critics Society	December 19, 2025	Best Action Film	Mission: Impossible – The Final Reckoning	Won	
Las Vegas Film Critics Society	December 19, 2025	Best Stunts	Mission: Impossible – The Final Reckoning	Won	
Las Vegas Film Critics Society	December 19, 2025	Best Visual Effects	Mission: Impossible – The Final Reckoning	Nominated	
Location Managers Guild International Awards	August 23, 2025	Outstanding Locations in a Contemporary Feature Film	Peter Bardsley, Jasmine Burridge, Clara Butler, Jonas Christiansen, Ben Firminger, Sam Millner, Morten Nelson, Niall O'Shea and Jason Roberts	Won	
Movieguide Awards	February 6, 2026	Best Movie for Mature Audiences	Mission: Impossible – The Final Reckoning	Nominated	
Movieguide Awards	February 6, 2026	Faith and Freedom Award for Movies	Mission: Impossible – The Final Reckoning	Nominated	
National Board of Review	December 3, 2025	Outstanding Achievement in Stunt Artistry	Mission: Impossible – The Final Reckoning	Won	
National Film Awards	July 1, 2026	Best International Film	Mission: Impossible – The Final Reckoning	Won	
Online Film Critics Society	January 26, 2026	Best Choreography (Dance & Stunt)	Mission: Impossible – The Final Reckoning	Nominated	
San Diego Film Critics Society	December 15, 2025	Best Visual Effects	Mission: Impossible – The Final Reckoning	Nominated	
San Diego Film Critics Society	December 15, 2025	Best Stunt Choreography	Mission: Impossible – The Final Reckoning	Won	
Satellite Awards	March 10, 2026	Best Sound (Editing and Mixing)	Chris Burdon, Lloyd Dudley, James H. Mather, Mark Taylor and Cécile Tournesac	Nominated	
Satellite Awards	March 10, 2026	Best Visual Effects	Alex Wuttke, Ian Lowe, Jeff Sutherland and Kirstin Hall	Nominated	
Saturn Awards	March 8, 2026	Best Action / Adventure Film	Mission: Impossible – The Final Reckoning	Won	
Saturn Awards	March 8, 2026	Best Film Direction	Christopher McQuarrie	Nominated	
Saturn Awards	March 8, 2026	Best Actor in a Film	Tom Cruise	Won	
Saturn Awards	March 8, 2026	Best Film Screenwriting	Christopher McQuarrie and Erik Jendresen	Nominated	
Saturn Awards	March 8, 2026	Best Film Editing	Eddie Hamilton	Nominated	
Saturn Awards	March 8, 2026	Best Film Visual / Special Effects	Alex Wuttke, Jeff Sutherland, Ian Lowe, Kristin Hall and Dave Newton	Nominated	
Saturn Awards	March 8, 2026	Best 4K Home Media Release	Mission: Impossible – The Final Reckoning	Nominated	
Seattle Film Critics Society	December 15, 2025	Best Action Choreography	Wade Eastwood	Won	
St. Louis Film Critics Association	December 14, 2025	Best Action Film	Mission: Impossible – The Final Reckoning	Won	
St. Louis Film Critics Association	December 14, 2025	Best Stunts	Mission: Impossible – The Final Reckoning	Won	
Washington D.C. Area Film Critics Association	December 7, 2025	Best Stunts	Mission: Impossible – The Final Reckoning	Won	
Yahoo! Japan Search Awards	December 3, 2025	Movie Category	Mission: Impossible – The Final Reckoning	3rd place	

== Future ==
In June 2023, McQuarrie told Fandango that both parts of Dead Reckoning would not necessarily end the series, and they were developing ideas for future installments. In July 2023, during promotion for Dead Reckoning, Cruise expressed interest in reprising his role as Hunt in future films, citing Harrison Ford's portrayal of Indiana Jones over 40 years from Raiders of the Lost Ark (1981) to Indiana Jones and the Dial of Destiny (2023).

On November 12, 2024, Jeff Sneider reported that Cruise sought to cast Glen Powell, one of his co-stars in Top Gun: Maverick (2022), to replace him as the new lead for potential future Mission: Impossible films; Powell denied this during an appearance on The Pat McAfee Show.

In May 2025, during the New York premiere for The Final Reckoning, Cruise confirmed that the film would be his final time portraying Ethan Hunt in the series, stating, "It's the final! It's not called 'final' for nothing."

== See also ==
- List of Mission: Impossible film locations
