= Mission: Impossible – Ghost Protocol =

2011 film by Brad Bird

- Theatrical release poster
- Directed by: Brad Bird
- Written by: Josh Appelbaum; André Nemec
- Based on: Mission: Impossible by Bruce Geller
- Produced by: Tom Cruise; J. J. Abrams; Bryan Burk
- Starring: Tom Cruise; Jeremy Renner; Simon Pegg; Paula Patton
- Cinematography: Robert Elswit
- Edited by: Paul Hirsch
- Music by: Michael Giacchino (Note: Mission: Impossible Theme composed by Lalo Schifrin)
- Production companies: Paramount Pictures; Skydance Productions; Bad Robot; TC Productions
- Distributed by: Paramount Pictures
- Release dates: December 7, 2011 (DIFF); December 16, 2011 (United States)
- Running time: 133 minutes
- Country: United States
- Language: English
- Budget: $145 million
- Box office: $694.7 million

Mission: Impossible – Ghost Protocol is a 2011 American action spy film directed by Brad Bird (in his live-action directorial debut) from a screenplay by the writing team of Josh Appelbaum and André Nemec, who also serve as co-producers. Produced by Tom Cruise, J. J. Abrams, and Bryan Burk, it is the sequel to Mission: Impossible III (2006) and the fourth installment in the Mission: Impossible film series. The film stars Cruise, Jeremy Renner, Simon Pegg, and Paula Patton, with Michael Nyqvist, Vladimir Mashkov, Josh Holloway, Anil Kapoor, and Léa Seydoux in supporting roles. In the film, the Impossible Missions Force (IMF) is shut down after being publicly implicated in a bombing of the Kremlin, causing Ethan Hunt (Cruise) and his team to go without their usual resources or backup in a life-threatening effort to clear their names.

Development for Mission: Impossible – Ghost Protocol began in August 2009, when Appelbaum and Nemec were hired to write the screenplay (which was later rewritten by eventual series director and writer Christopher McQuarrie). Cruise's return was confirmed by March 2010 after Bird was announced to direct the film, replacing Abrams (who directed the predecessor), who stayed on this film as a producer. The film was officially titled in October 2010, after which, principal photography took place and lasted until March 2011, with filming locations including Bangalore, Mumbai, Budapest, Moscow, Dubai, and Canadian Motion Picture Park Studios in Vancouver. Like previous entries in the franchise, the cast, most notably Cruise, completed most of their own stunts, while parts of the film were shot in IMAX.

Mission: Impossible – Ghost Protocol premiered at the Dubai International Film Festival on December 7, 2011, and was released in IMAX and select large-format theaters on December 16, before being theatrically released in the United States by Paramount Pictures on December 21. It received positive reviews from critics, with praise for the action sequences, Cruise's performance, and Bird's direction. It grossed $694.7 million worldwide, becoming the fifth-highest-grossing film of 2011, as well as the highest-grossing film in the franchise and the highest-grossing film starring Cruise until it was surpassed by Mission: Impossible – Rogue Nation (2015). Retrospective reviews later credit the film for revitalizing the Mission: Impossible franchise back into mainstream success. The film was followed by Mission: Impossible – Rogue Nation in 2015.

== Plot ==
IMF agent Trevor Hanaway is killed in Budapest by assassin Sabine Moreau, who steals Russian nuclear launch codes to sell to a man named "Cobalt". IMF agent Ethan Hunt is extracted from a Moscow prison, along with an asset named Bogdan, by Hanaway's handler and girlfriend, Jane Carter, and newly promoted field agent Benji Dunn. The team is ordered to infiltrate the Kremlin for information on Cobalt. While they are inside, Cobalt blows the team's cover, and they escape before a bomb destroys the Kremlin. Ethan is arrested by SVR agent Anatoly Sidorov and is blamed for the bombing.

Ethan escapes and meets with the IMF Secretary in Moscow with analyst William Brandt. Brandt identifies Cobalt as Kurt Hendricks, a strategist seeking nuclear war between the U.S. and Russia. They determine that Hendricks bombed the Kremlin to cover his theft of a Russian launch control device. The Secretary explains that the President has initiated the "Ghost Protocol", disavowing the IMF. He secretly orders Ethan to continue pursuing Cobalt before being killed along with both his driver and bodyguard in an ambush by Sidorov's forces. Ethan escapes with Brandt and regroups with Jane and Benji. They plan to infiltrate a meeting between Hendricks's associate, Wistrom, and Moreau at the Burj Khalifa in Dubai, where Wistrom will buy the stolen launch codes.

The team plans to intercept the codes by faking two meetings: Ethan and Brandt posing as Wistrom and Leonid Lisenker, a cryptographer, to receive the codes from Moreau; Jane poses as Moreau, passing counterfeit codes to the real Wistrom and Lisenker. They are forced to give the actual codes when they discover that Lisenker can immediately authenticate them, relying on radioactive isotopes on the paper to track Wistrom afterward. Completing the buy, Wistrom double-crosses and murders Lisenker. Having deduced that the buy is a setup, Moreau attempts to flee, but Jane intercepts her. When Moreau attacks Benji while trying to escape, an enraged Jane breaks her promise to Ethan earlier about fighting assets and attacks Moreau. Brandt overhears the gunfire and rushes into the room but fails to stop Jane from defenestrating Moreau. Sidorov attempts but fails to apprehend Ethan, who flees the Burj Khalifa and pursues Wistrom.

As Ethan and Wistrom run into a sandstorm, Wistrom reveals himself to be a masked Hendricks and escapes. In front of the team, Ethan confronts Brandt over the advanced fighting skills that he displayed in the hotel. After Ethan leaves, Brandt admits he resigned as a field agent after failing to protect Julia Meade, Ethan's wife, (Note: As depicted in Mission: Impossible III (2006)) from a hit. Bogdan takes Ethan to the Fog, an arms dealer, and learns that Hendricks is planning to launch missiles using an old Soviet military satellite. The satellite is owned by an Indian media tycoon, Brij Nath. The Fog sells the same information to Sidorov. In Mumbai, Jane seduces Nath and then overpowers him to get the satellite's override code; the team pursues Hendricks and Wistrom to one of Nath's broadcast stations to stop him from sending the codes via the satellite.

Hendricks sends launch orders to a Russian nuclear submarine to fire a missile at San Francisco, while Wistrom sabotages the station system to prevent IMF interference. Benji, Brandt, and Jane attempt to repair the station while Ethan pursues Hendricks. Cornered by Ethan, Hendricks kills himself by jumping off a high ledge with the launch device to place it out of reach. After Benji kills Wistrom, Brandt turns on the power and Jane reconnects the system; Ethan then retrieves the launch device to disable the missile moments before detonation; a fatally wounded Hendricks witnesses the failure of his plan before dying. Sidorov arrives and realizes that the IMF was innocent of the Kremlin bombing, thus clearing its name and being reinstated.

In Seattle, Ethan assembles his team for another mission given by Luther Stickell. Brandt confesses to Ethan his failure to protect Julia, but Ethan reveals that she is alive and her death was staged to give her a new identity safely away from him and to let him infiltrate the prison to find Bogdan. A relieved Brandt accepts his mission. Julia arrives and smiles at Ethan from afar before he slips away and receives an IMF briefing.

== Cast ==
- Tom Cruise as Ethan Hunt: An agent of the Impossible Missions Force (IMF).
- Jeremy Renner as William Brandt: The IMF Secretary's aide and an intelligence analyst. Former field agent.
- Simon Pegg as Benji Dunn: A new IMF field agent and former IMF technician.
- Paula Patton as Jane Carter: An IMF agent and Hanaway's handler who works with Ethan.
- Michael Nyqvist as Kurt Hendricks: A Swedish-born Russian nuclear strategist codenamed "Cobalt".
- Vladimir Mashkov as Anatoly Sidorov: A Russian SVR Agent who is after Ethan.
- Léa Seydoux as Sabine Moreau: An assassin who worked for Hendricks in Dubai.
- Josh Holloway as Trevor Hanaway: An IMF agent murdered by Moreau.
- Anil Kapoor as Brij Nath: A media tycoon in Mumbai.
- Samuli Edelmann as Marius Wistrom: Hendricks's henchman.
- Ivan Shvedoff as Leonid Lisenker: A cryptography expert coerced by Hendricks.
- Miraj Grbić as Bogdan: An informant in a Moscow prison.
- Ilia Volok as The Fog: An arms dealer and Bogdan's cousin.
- Andreas Wisniewski as The Fog's contact. Wisniewski's character originally appeared in Mission: Impossible, working for arms dealer Max.
- Tom Wilkinson (uncredited) as the IMF Secretary
- Ving Rhames (uncredited cameo) as Luther Stickell: Ethan's oldest friend and main computer technician who sits out the mission.
- Michelle Monaghan (uncredited cameo) as Julia Meade-Hunt: Ethan's wife.
- Goran Navojec (uncredited cameo) as Russian prisoner

== Production ==
=== Development ===
Despite Mission: Impossible III (2006) earning less than its predecessors at the box office, Paramount Pictures was keen on developing a fourth film in the Mission: Impossible film series. In August 2009, Josh Appelbaum and André Nemec were hired to write the film's screenplay. Due to commitments to his film Super 8, J. J. Abrams said that it was unlikely for him to return as director but made note that he would produce the film alongside Tom Cruise. By March 2010, director Brad Bird was in talks to direct the film (beating out other contenders such as Ruben Fleischer and Edgar Wright) with Cruise returning to star as Ethan Hunt. The film was originally announced with the working title of Mission: Impossible 4 and code-named "Aries" during early production. By August 2010, title considerations did not include the Mission: Impossible 4 name, and thought was given to omitting the specific term "Mission: Impossible", which Variety compared to Christopher Nolan's Batman sequel film The Dark Knight. In late October 2010, the title was confirmed as Mission: Impossible – Ghost Protocol.

=== Casting ===
Jeremy Renner was announced to have joined the film on August 26, 2010. Deadline Hollywood reported that Renner's character would be a potential lead for future films if Cruise decided to quit the franchise. Cruise subsequently denied this. On August 27, it was reported that Lauren German, Paula Patton and Kristin Kreuk were auditioning for the role of a young female operative. On September 1, Patton was announced to have been cast in the part. Vladimir Mashkov was announced on September 23 as a Russian agent. On 28 September Josh Holloway was announced as a member of the Impossible Missions Force. On October 7 Anil Kapoor was announced in a supporting role. The same day, Léa Seydoux was announced as a female villain.

=== Filming ===
The film was partially shot with IMAX film cameras, which made up approximately 30 minutes of the film's run time. Bird insisted that certain scenes of the film be shot in IMAX, as opposed to 3D, as he felt that the IMAX format offered the viewer more immersion due to its brighter, higher quality image, which is projected on a larger screen, without the need for specialised glasses. Bird also believed that the IMAX format would bring back "a level of showmanship" to the presentation of Hollywood films, which he believes the industry has lost due to its emphasis on screening films in multiplexes as opposed to grand theaters, and vetoing "first runs" in favor of wider initial releases.

When we were first looking at the image of Tom climbing the Burj, in the long shots we could not only see the traffic in the reflections when he presses down on the glass ... But you actually saw the glass warp slightly because of the pressure of his hand. You would never see that in 35mm. The fact that the screen fills your vision and is super sharp seems more life-like.

— Brad Bird describing the advantages of filming in the IMAX format

Principal photography took place from October 2010 to March 19, 2011. Filming took place in Budapest, Mumbai, Prague, Moscow, Vancouver, Bangalore, Chennai, and Dubai. Although Cruise appears to be free solo climbing in the film with the help of special gloves, in reality, he was securely attached to the Burj Khalifa at all times by multiple cables; Industrial Light & Magic digitally erased the cables in post-production. Following Cruise's example, Patton and Seydoux also chose to forgo the use of stunt doubles for their fight scene at the Burj Khalifa.

Many of the film's interior scenes were shot at Vancouver's Canadian Motion Picture Park Studios, including a key transition scene in a specially equipped IMF train car and the fight between Hunt and Hendricks in a Mumbai automated multi-level parking garage (which was constructed over a six-month period just for the film). The Vancouver Convention Centre was modified to double as downtown Mumbai. The film's opening Moscow prison escape scenes were shot on location in a real former prison near Prague.

In the middle of production Cruise brought screenwriter Christopher McQuarrie, with whom he had worked on the film Valkyrie (2008) to rewrite the screenplay. McQuarrie described his contribution: "The script had these fantastic sequences in it but there was a mystery in it that was very complicated. What I did was about clarity. The mystery had to be made simpler." McQuarrie did not receive a screenplay credit for his rewrite, although certain trailers included his name in the credits.

Bird incorporated the trademark "A113", a reference to the classroom he attended while in the California Institute of the Arts, into the film on two separate occasions. The first is the design print on Hanaway's ring during the flashback sequence, and the second being when Hunt calls in for support and uses the drop callsign, Alpha 1–1–3.

== Music ==
The musical score for Mission: Impossible – Ghost Protocol was composed by Michael Giacchino, who also composed the music for the third film and collaborated with Bird on The Incredibles (2004) and Ratatouille (2007), conducted by Tim Simonec and performed by the Hollywood Studio Symphony. As in previous installments, the score incorporates Lalo Schifrin's themes from the original television series. "Lalo is an amazing jazz writer. You know you can't write a straight-up jazz score for a film like this but you can certainly hint at it here and there," said Giacchino, explaining the stylistic influence generated by Schifrin's history with the franchise. A soundtrack album was released by Varèse Sarabande on December 13, 2011.

== Marketing ==
In June 2011, a teaser trailer for Ghost Protocol was released in front of Transformers: Dark of the Moon, illustrating new shots from the film, one of which being Tom Cruise scaling the world's tallest building, the Burj Khalifa in Dubai. Moreover, prior to its release, the studio presented IMAX footage of the film to an invitation-only crowd of opinion makers and journalists at central London's BFI IMAX theater. One of the many scenes that were included was a chase scene in a Dubai desert sandstorm.

During November 2011, the Paramount released a Facebook game of the film in order to promote it. The new game allowed players to choose the roles of IMF agents and assemble teams to embark on a multiplayer journey. Players were also able to garner tickets to the film's American premiere and a hometown screening of the film for 30 friends.

== Release ==
=== Theatrical ===
Following the world premiere in Dubai on December 7, 2011, the film was released in IMAX and other large-format theaters in the U.S. on December 16, 2011, with general release on December 21, 2011. This is the first film to use the new Paramount Pictures logo, with the a brand new fanfare composed by Michael Giacchino, who also composed the film, as part of the studio's 100th anniversary in 2012.

=== Home media ===
Mission: Impossible – Ghost Protocol was released on DVD, Blu-ray, and digital download on April 17, 2012. The home media releases, however, do not preserve the original IMAX imagery, and its aspect ratio is consistently cropped to 2.40:1 rather than switching to a 1.78:1 aspect ratio during the IMAX scenes. Prior Blu-ray Disc releases such as The Dark Knight, Tron: Legacy, and Transformers: Revenge of the Fallen have switched between 2.40:1 for regular scenes and 1.78:1 for IMAX scenes. The film was released on 4K UHD Blu-ray on June 26, 2018.

== Reception ==
=== Box office ===
Ghost Protocol grossed $209.4 million in North America and $485.3 million in other countries for a worldwide total of $694.7 million. It is the second-highest-grossing film worldwide in the Mission: Impossible series, and the fifth-highest-grossing film of 2011. It is also the third-highest-grossing film worldwide starring Cruise, surpassing War of the Worlds from the top spot. It was the franchise's highest-grossing film and Cruise's biggest film at the time of release, before being surpassed by Mission: Impossible – Rogue Nation four years later.

In its limited release at 425 locations in North America, it earned $12.8 million over its opening weekend, finishing in third behind Sherlock Holmes: A Game of Shadows and Alvin and the Chipmunks: Chipwrecked. After five days of its limited release, it expanded to 3,448 theaters on its sixth day and reached #1 at the box office with $8.92 million. The film reached the top stop at the box office in its second and third weekends with $29.6 million and $29.4 million, respectively. Though only 9% of the film's screenings were in IMAX theaters, they accounted for 23% of the film's box office.

Outside North America, it debuted to $69.5 million in 42 markets representing approximately 70% of the marketplace. In the United Arab Emirates, it set an opening-weekend record of $2.4 million (since surpassed by Marvel's The Avengers). In two countries outside the U.S. in which filming took place, its opening weekend gross increased by multiples over the previous installment: in Russia, more than doubling, to $6.08 million and in India, more than quadrupling, to $4.0 million. It is the second-highest-grossing Mission: Impossible film outside North America. It topped the box office outside North America for three consecutive weekends (during December 2011) and five weekends in total (the other two in 2012). Its highest-grossing markets after North America are China ($102.5 million), Japan ($69.7 million), and South Korea ($51.1 million).

=== Critical response ===
On Rotten Tomatoes, Mission: Impossible – Ghost Protocol has an approval rating of 94% based on 253 reviews and an average rating of 7.7/10. The critical consensus on Rotten Tomatoes reads: "Stylish, fast-paced, and loaded with gripping set pieces, the fourth Mission: Impossible is big-budget popcorn entertainment that really works." Metacritic assigned the film a score of 73 out of 100 based on 47 critics, indicating "generally favorable reviews". Audiences polled by CinemaScore gave the film an average grade of "A−" on an A+ to F scale.

Roger Ebert of the Chicago Sun-Times gave the film 3.5 out of four stars, saying the film "is a terrific thriller with action sequences that function as a kind of action poetry." Stephen Whitty of The Star-Ledger wrote "The eye-candy—from high-tech gadgets to gorgeous people—has only been ratcheted up. And so has the excitement." He also gave the film 3.5 out of four stars. Giving the film three out of four stars, Wesley Morris of The Boston Globe said "In its way, the movie has old-Hollywood elegance. The scope and sets are vast, tall, and cavernous, but Bird scales down for spatial intimacy."

Philippa Hawker of The Sydney Morning Herald gave the film three stars out of five and said it is "ludicrously improbable, but also quite fun." Owen Gleiberman of Entertainment Weekly opined that the movie "brims with scenes that are exciting and amazing at the same time; they're brought off with such casual aplomb that they're funny, too. ... Ghost Protocol is fast and explosive, but it's also a supremely clever sleight-of-hand thriller. Brad Bird, the animation wizard, ... showing an animator's miraculously precise use of visual space, has a playful, screw-tightening ingenuity all his own." Roger Moore of The Charlotte Observer gave the film three out of four stars; said "Brad Bird passes his audition for a career as a live-action director. And Ghost Protocol more than makes its bones as an argument for why Tom Cruise should continue in this role as long as his knees, and his nerves, hold up."

=== Accolades ===
Accolades received by Mission: Impossible – Ghost Protocol
Award	Date of ceremony	Category	Recipient(s)	Result	Ref.
Alliance of Women Film Journalists Awards	January 10, 2012	Kick Ass Award for Best Female Action Star	Paula Patton	Nominated	
Golden Reel Awards	February 19, 2012	Outstanding Achievement in Sound Editing – Sound Effects and Foley for Feature Film	Mission: Impossible – Ghost Protocol	Nominated	
Golden Trailer Awards	May 31, 2012	Best Action TV Spot	"Trailer 1" (AV Squad)	Nominated	
Golden Trailer Awards	May 31, 2012	Best Action TV Spot	"Harder" (AV Squad)	Nominated	
Golden Trailer Awards	May 31, 2012	Best Graphics in a TV Spot	"Masthead:15" (AV Squad)	Nominated	
Golden Trailer Awards	May 6, 2015	Most Original TV Spot	"Prison Mission" (n87 Creative)	Nominated	
Golden Trailer Awards	June 29, 2023	Most Original TV Spot (for a Feature Film)	Mission: Impossible – Christmas Protocol (Creative EMEAA)	Nominated	
International Film Music Critics Association Awards	February 23, 2012	Best Original Score for an Action/Adventure/Thriller Film	Michael Giacchino	Nominated	
MTV Movie Awards	June 3, 2012	Best Fight	Tom Cruise vs. Michael Nyqvist	Nominated	
MTV Movie Awards	June 3, 2012	Best Gut-Wrenching Performance	Tom Cruise	Nominated	
Nickelodeon Kids' Choice Awards	March 31, 2012	Favorite Buttkicker	Tom Cruise	Nominated	
Saturn Awards	July 26, 2012	Best Action or Adventure Film	Mission: Impossible – Ghost Protocol	Won	
Saturn Awards	July 26, 2012	Best Director	Brad Bird	Nominated	
Saturn Awards	July 26, 2012	Best Actor	Tom Cruise	Nominated	
Saturn Awards	July 26, 2012	Best Supporting Actress	Paula Patton	Nominated	
Saturn Awards	July 26, 2012	Best Music	Michael Giacchino	Nominated	
Saturn Awards	July 26, 2012	Best Editing	Paul Hirsch	Won	
Teen Choice Awards	July 22, 2012	Choice Movie: Action	Mission Impossible – Ghost Protocol	Nominated	
Teen Choice Awards	July 22, 2012	Choice Movie Actor: Action	Tom Cruise	Nominated	
Teen Choice Awards	July 22, 2012	Choice Movie Actress: Action	Paula Patton	Nominated	
Visual Effects Society Awards	February 7, 2012	Outstanding Models in a Feature Motion Picture	John Goodson, Paul Francis Russell, and Victor Schutz	Nominated	

== Sequel ==
Ghost Protocol was followed by Rogue Nation (2015). It achieved similar financial and critical success as Ghost Protocol. A sixth film, Fallout, was released in 2018, receiving critical praise and surpassing the box-office take of Ghost Protocol. (Note: Attributed to multiple references:)
