= Mission: Impossible (film series) =

Action spy film series

- Official film series logo
- Based on: Mission: Impossible by Bruce Geller
- Produced by: Tom Cruise; Paula Wagner (1–3); J. J. Abrams (4–6); Christopher McQuarrie (6–8)
- Starring: Tom Cruise; Ving Rhames; Henry Czerny (1, 7–8); Simon Pegg (3–8); Rebecca Ferguson (5–7)
- Production companies: Paramount Pictures; Cruise/Wagner Productions (1–3); Skydance (4–8) (Note: Known as Skydance Productions for the fourth and fifth films. The company later merged with Paramount Global to form Paramount Skydance Corporation.); TC Productions (4–8); Bad Robot (4–6)
- Distributed by: Paramount Pictures
- Running time: 110–170 minutes
- Country: United States
- Language: English
- Budget: $1.5 billion (8 films)
- Box office: $4.74 billion (8 films)

Mission: Impossible is an American series of action spy films, based on the 1966 television series created by Bruce Geller. The series is mainly produced by Tom Cruise, who plays Ethan Hunt, an agent of the Impossible Missions Force (IMF). The films have been directed, written, and scored by various filmmakers and crew, while incorporating musical themes from the original series by Lalo Schifrin.

Starting in 1996, the series follows the missions of the IMF's main field team, under Hunt's leadership, to stop an enemy force and prevent an impending global disaster. The series focuses on Hunt's character, and like the television series' structure, is complemented by an ensemble cast, such as Luther Stickell (played by Ving Rhames) and Benji Dunn (played by Simon Pegg), who have recurring roles.

The series has experienced a generally positive reception from critics and audience. It is the 16th-highest-grossing film series of all time, earning over $4.35 billion worldwide, and is often cited as one of the best action franchises to date. The sixth film, subtitled Fallout, was released on July 27, 2018, and is currently the series' highest-grossing entry. The seventh film, Dead Reckoning Part One, (Note: Retroactively retitled Mission: Impossible – Dead Reckoning upon release on streaming platforms.) was released in July 2023, and the eighth film, The Final Reckoning, had its theatrical release in late May 2025. The films are co-produced and released by Paramount Pictures.

In 2024, the series received its first Academy Award nominations, with Dead Reckoning Part One being nominated in the categories of Best Visual Effects and Best Sound at the 96th ceremony.

== Films ==
Mission: Impossible films
Film	U.S. release date	Directed by	Screenplay by	Story by	Produced by
Mission: Impossible	May 22, 1996	Brian De Palma	David Koepp & Robert Towne	David Koepp & Steven Zaillian	Tom Cruise & Paula Wagner
Mission: Impossible 2	May 24, 2000	John Woo	Robert Towne	Brannon Braga & Ronald D. Moore	Tom Cruise & Paula Wagner
Mission: Impossible III	May 5, 2006	J. J. Abrams	J. J. Abrams, Roberto Orci & Alex Kurtzman	J. J. Abrams, Roberto Orci & Alex Kurtzman	Tom Cruise & Paula Wagner
Mission: Impossible – Ghost Protocol	December 16, 2011	Brad Bird	André Nemec & Josh Appelbaum	André Nemec & Josh Appelbaum	Tom Cruise, Bryan Burk & J. J. Abrams
Mission: Impossible – Rogue Nation	July 31, 2015	Christopher McQuarrie	Christopher McQuarrie	Drew Pearce & Christopher McQuarrie	Tom Cruise, Bryan Burk, Don Granger, J. J. Abrams, Dana Goldberg & David Ellison
Mission: Impossible – Fallout	July 27, 2018	Christopher McQuarrie	Christopher McQuarrie	Christopher McQuarrie	Tom Cruise, Jake Myers, J. J. Abrams & Christopher McQuarrie
Mission: Impossible – Dead Reckoning Part One	July 12, 2023	Christopher McQuarrie	Christopher McQuarrie & Erik Jendresen	Christopher McQuarrie & Erik Jendresen	Tom Cruise & Christopher McQuarrie
Mission: Impossible – The Final Reckoning	May 23, 2025	Christopher McQuarrie	Christopher McQuarrie & Erik Jendresen	Christopher McQuarrie & Erik Jendresen	Tom Cruise & Christopher McQuarrie

Film releases timeline
1996	Mission: Impossible
1997
1998
1999
2000	Mission: Impossible 2
2001
2002
2003
2004
2005
2006	Mission: Impossible III
2007
2008
2009
2010
2011	Ghost Protocol
2012
2013
2014
2015	Rogue Nation
2016
2017
2018	Fallout
2019
2020
2021
2022
2023	Dead Reckoning
2024
2025	The Final Reckoning

=== Mission: Impossible (1996) ===
In the first film of the series, Ethan Hunt is framed for the murder of his Impossible Mission Force (IMF) team during a botched mission in Prague and accused of selling government secrets to an arms dealer known only as "Max". On the run, Ethan seeks to discover the real traitor and clear his name from the incident.

=== Mission: Impossible 2 (2000) ===
In the second film, Ethan Hunt goes back in action and works with a professional thief Nyah Nordoff-Hall (Thandie Newton). The duo go undercover to stop rogue IMF agent Sean Ambrose (Dougray Scott) (who is also Nyah's former lover) from stealing a deadly virus, starting a pandemic and selling the antidote to the highest bidder.

=== Mission: Impossible III (2006) ===
In the third film, Ethan is engaged to Julia Meade (Michelle Monaghan), who is unaware of his true job. He assembles a team to face the elusive arms and information broker Owen Davian (Philip Seymour Hoffman) who intends to sell a mysterious dangerous object known as "The Rabbit's Foot".

=== Mission: Impossible – Ghost Protocol (2011) ===
In the fourth film, Ethan and the entire IMF are framed for the bombing of the Kremlin while investigating an individual known only as "Cobalt" (Michael Nyqvist). Ethan and three other agents are left to stop Cobalt from starting a global nuclear war.

=== Mission: Impossible – Rogue Nation (2015) ===
In the fifth film, Ethan Hunt comes under threat from the Syndicate. Faced with the IMF's disbandment, Hunt assembles his team for their mission to prove the Syndicate's existence and bring the organization down by any means necessary.

=== Mission: Impossible – Fallout (2018) ===
In the sixth film, when an IMF mission to recover plutonium goes wrong, the world is faced with the threat of the Apostles, a terrorist group formed by former members of the Syndicate. As Ethan Hunt takes it upon himself to fulfill the original mission, the CIA begins to question his loyalty and his motives.

=== Mission: Impossible – Dead Reckoning Part One (2023) ===
In the seventh film, an AI called the Entity is responsible for the sinking of the next-generation Russian submarine Sevastopol. The Entity has since gone rogue and entrenched itself into cyberspace; the secret to stopping or controlling it lies with the key, which Ethan Hunt and the IMF must track down, as various world powers and nefarious forces race to obtain the key in order to use the Entity for their own purpose.

=== Mission: Impossible – The Final Reckoning (2025) ===
In the eighth film, two months later, Ethan Hunt and the IMF, joined by new allies, continue to search for the Entity, aiming to destroy it before it can trigger a nuclear apocalypse.

=== Future ===
In June 2023, Christopher McQuarrie stated that Dead Reckoning Part One and The Final Reckoning would not end the series, as there are developments for future installments. In July 2023, during promotion for Dead Reckoning Part One, Cruise expressed interest in continuing to make further films in the series as Ethan Hunt, despite both films having previously been billed as a send-off to the character. Inspired by Harrison Ford's continued success in the Indiana Jones films, Cruise stated that he would like to keep making Mission: Impossible films until he is likewise in his eighties. Nevertheless, in May 2025, during the New York premiere for The Final Reckoning, Cruise confirmed that the film would be his final film in the series, stating "The film is the final! It's not called 'final' for nothing".

== Cast and characters ==
List indicators

This section includes characters who will appear or have appeared in the Mission Impossible film series.

- An empty grey cell indicates the character was not in the film, or that the character's official presence has not yet been confirmed.
- ^{A} indicates an appearance through archival footage or audio.
- ^{C} indicates a cameo role.
- ^{P} indicates an appearance in onscreen photographs.
- ^{U} indicates an uncredited appearance.
- ^{V} indicates a voice-only role.

Character	Films							
Character	Mission: Impossible	Mission: Impossible 2	Mission: Impossible III	Mission: Impossible – Ghost Protocol	Mission: Impossible – Rogue Nation	Mission: Impossible – Fallout	Mission: Impossible – Dead Reckoning Part One	Mission: Impossible – The Final Reckoning
Character	1996	2000	2006	2011	2015	2018	2023	2025
Ethan Hunt	Tom Cruise	Tom Cruise	Tom Cruise	Tom Cruise	Tom Cruise	Tom Cruise	Tom Cruise	Tom Cruise
Luther Stickell	Ving Rhames	Ving Rhames	Ving Rhames	Ving Rhames^{U}^{C}	Ving Rhames	Ving Rhames	Ving Rhames	Ving Rhames
The Voice on Tape	Henry Czerny	Anthony Hopkins	Billy Crudup^{V}	Teddy Newton^{V}	Teddy Newton^{V}	Christopher McQuarrie^{V}	Henry Czerny	Angela Bassett^{V}
Eugene Kittridge	Henry Czerny						Henry Czerny	Henry Czerny
William Donloe	Rolf Saxon							Rolf Saxon
The Contact	Andreas Wisniewski			Andreas Wisniewski^{C}				
Jim Phelps	Jon Voight							Jon Voight^{U}^{A}
Claire Phelps	Emmanuelle Béart							Emmanuelle Béart^{U}^{A}
Franz Krieger	Jean Reno							
Sarah Davies	Kristin Scott Thomas							Kristin Scott Thomas^{U}^{A}
Max Mitsopolis The Black Widow	Vanessa Redgrave					Mentioned	Mentioned	Vanessa Redgrave^{U}^{A}
Hannah Williams	Ingeborga Dapkūnaitė							Ingeborga Dapkūnaitė^{U}^{A}
Jack Harmon	Emilio Estevez^{U}							Emilio Estevez^{U}^{A}
Alexander Golitsyn	Marcel Iureș							
Sean Ambrose		Dougray Scott						Dougray Scott^{U}^{A}
Nyah Nordoff-Hall		Thandie Newton						
Hugh Stamp		Richard Roxburgh						
Billy Baird		John Polson						
John C. McCloy		Brendan Gleeson						
Dr. Vladimir Nekhorvich		Rade Šerbedžija						
Benjamin "Benji" Dunn			Simon Pegg	Simon Pegg	Simon Pegg	Simon Pegg	Simon Pegg	Simon Pegg
Dr. Julia "Jules" Meade			Michelle Monaghan	Michelle Monaghan^{U}^{C}		Michelle Monaghan		Michelle Monaghan^{U}^{A}
Owen Davian			Philip Seymour Hoffman					Philip Seymour Hoffman^{U}^{A}
John Musgrave			Billy Crudup					
Declan Gormley			Jonathan Rhys Meyers					
Lindsey Farris			Keri Russell					Keri Russell^{U}^{A}
Zhen Lei			Maggie Q					Maggie Q^{U}^{A}
Theodore Brassel			Laurence Fishburne					Laurence Fishburne^{U}^{A}
William Brandt				Jeremy Renner	Jeremy Renner			Jeremy Renner^{U}^{A}
Jane Carter				Paula Patton				Paula Patton^{U}^{A}
Kurt Hendricks "Cobalt"				Michael Nyqvist				Michael Nyqvist^{U}^{A}
Anatoly Sidorov				Vladimir Mashkov				
Sabine Moreau				Léa Seydoux				Léa Seydoux^{U}^{A}
Trevor Hanaway				Josh Holloway				
Briji Nath				Anil Kapoor				
Marius Wistrom				Samuli Edelmann				
Leonid Lisenker				Ivan Shvedoff				
IIsa Faust					Rebecca Ferguson	Rebecca Ferguson	Rebecca Ferguson	Rebecca Ferguson^{U}^{A}
Solomon Lane					Sean Harris	Sean Harris		Sean Harris^{U}^{A}^{V}
Alan Hunley					Alec Baldwin	Alec Baldwin		Alec Baldwin^{U}^{A}
Atlee					Simon McBurney			
Lauren					Zhang Jingchu			
the Prime Minister of the United Kingdom					Tom Hollander			
Janik "Bone" Doctor" Vinter					Jens Hultén			Jens Hultén^{U}^{A}
Alanna Mitsopolis The White Widow						Vanessa Kirby	Vanessa Kirby	Vanessa Kirby^{U}^{A}^{V}
Zola Mitsopolis						Frederick Schmidt	Frederick Schmidt	
President Erika Sloane						Angela Bassett	Angela Bassett^{P}	Angela Bassett
August Walker						Henry Cavill		Henry Cavill^{U}^{A}
Erik						Wes Bentley		
John Lark						Liang Yang		Liang Yang^{U}^{A}
Nils Delbruuk						Kristoffer Joner		Kristoffer Joner^{U}^{A}
Grace							Hayley Atwell	Hayley Atwell
Gabriel Martinelli							Esai Morales	Esai Morales
Paris							Pom Klementieff	Pom Klementieff
Marie							Mariela Garriga	Mariela Garriga
Jim Phelps Jr. Jasper Briggs							Shea Whigham	Shea Whigham
Theo Degas							Greg Tarzan Davis	Greg Tarzan Davis
Head of the NSA							Mark Gatiss	Mark Gatiss
Head of the NRO							Charles Parnell	Charles Parnell
Delinger							Cary Elwes	Cary Elwes
Head of the JSOC							Rob Delaney	
Head of the DIA							Indira Varma	
Serling Bernstein								Holt McCallany
Walters								Janet McTeer
General Sidney								Nick Offerman
Rear Admiral Neely								Hannah Waddingham
Capt. Jack Bledsoe								Tramell Tillman

== Additional crew and production details ==
Production details of Mission: Impossible films
Film	Crew/Detail					
Film	Composer	Cinematographer	Editor(s)	Production companies	Distributing companies	Running time
Mission: Impossible	Danny Elfman	Stephen H. Burum	Paul Hirsch	Paramount Pictures; Cruise/Wagner Productions	Paramount Pictures	110 min
Mission: Impossible 2	Hans Zimmer	Jeffrey L. Kimball	Steven Kemper; Christian Wagner	Paramount Pictures; Cruise/Wagner Productions; Munich Film Partners & Company	Paramount Pictures	124 min
Mission: Impossible III	Michael Giacchino	Dan Mindel	Mary Jo Markey; Maryann Brandon	Paramount Pictures; Cruise/Wagner Productions; The Fourth Production Company Film Group	Paramount Pictures	126 min
Mission: Impossible – Ghost Protocol	Michael Giacchino	Robert Elswit	Paul Hirsch	TC Productions; Skydance Media; Paramount Pictures; Bad Robot	Paramount Pictures	133 min
Mission: Impossible – Rogue Nation	Joe Kraemer	Robert Elswit	Eddie Hamilton	TC Productions; Skydance Media; Paramount Pictures; Bad Robot	Paramount Pictures	131 min
Mission: Impossible – Fallout	Lorne Balfe	Rob Hardy	Eddie Hamilton	TC Productions; Skydance Media; Paramount Pictures; Bad Robot	Paramount Pictures	147 min
Mission: Impossible – Dead Reckoning Part One	Lorne Balfe	Fraser Taggart	Eddie Hamilton	TC Productions; Skydance Media; Paramount Pictures	Paramount Pictures	163 min
Mission: Impossible – The Final Reckoning	Max Aruj and Alfie Godfrey	Fraser Taggart	Eddie Hamilton	TC Productions; Skydance Media; Paramount Pictures	Paramount Pictures	170 min

== Reception ==
=== Box office performance ===
Box-office performance of Mission: Impossible films (Dollar amounts are not adjusted for inflation)
Film	U.S. release date	Budget	Box-office gross		
Film	U.S. release date	Budget	Domestic	International	Worldwide
Mission: Impossible	May 22, 1996	$80 million	$180,981,856	$276,714,535	$457,696,391
Mission: Impossible 2	May 24, 2000	$125 million	$215,409,889	$330,978,219	$546,388,108
Mission: Impossible III	May 5, 2006	$150 million	$134,029,801	$264,449,696	$398,479,497
Mission: Impossible – Ghost Protocol	December 16, 2011	$145 million	$209,397,903	$485,315,477	$694,713,380
Mission: Impossible – Rogue Nation	July 31, 2015	$150 million	$195,042,377	$515,874,026	$710,916,403
Mission: Impossible – Fallout	July 27, 2018	$178 million	$220,159,104	$571,498,294	$791,657,398
Mission: Impossible – Dead Reckoning Part One	July 12, 2023	$291 million	$172,640,980	$398,484,455	$571,125,435
Mission: Impossible – The Final Reckoning	May 23, 2025	$300–400 million	$197,413,515	$401,353,542	$598,767,057
Total		$1.419–1.519 billion	$1,525,075,425	$3,244,668,244	$4,769,743,669

=== Critical and public response ===
The Mission: Impossible film series has received positive reviews from critics and audiences, with Ghost Protocol through Dead Reckoning Part One attracting significant praise directed towards their direction, cinematography, stunts, action sequences, performances, and musical scores.

Critical and popular reception of Mission: Impossible films
Film	Rotten Tomatoes	Metacritic	CinemaScore
Mission: Impossible	65% (159 reviews)	59 (29 reviews)	B+
Mission: Impossible 2	57% (211 reviews)	59 (40 reviews)	B
Mission: Impossible III	73% (248 reviews)	66 (42 reviews)	A−
Mission: Impossible – Ghost Protocol	94% (250 reviews)	73 (47 reviews)	A−
Mission: Impossible – Rogue Nation	94% (326 reviews)	75 (46 reviews)	A−
Mission: Impossible – Fallout	98% (443 reviews)	87 (60 reviews)	A
Mission: Impossible – Dead Reckoning Part One	96% (439 reviews)	81 (66 reviews)	A
Mission: Impossible – The Final Reckoning	80% (428 reviews)	67 (57 reviews)	A−

== Music ==
Theme

The television version is in a rarely used 5/4 time (an unusual time signature with five crotchets to a bar) and is difficult to dance to, as was demonstrated by a memorable segment of American Bandstand in which teenage dancers were caught off-guard by Dick Clark's playing of the Lalo Schifrin single release.

The opening theme music for the eight films are stylized renditions of Schifrin's original iconic theme, preserving the 5/4 rhythm, by Danny Elfman, Hans Zimmer, Michael Giacchino, Joe Kraemer, Lorne Balfe, Max Aruj and Alfie Godfrey, respectively.

For Adam Clayton and Larry Mullen Jr.'s version featured on the first film's motion picture soundtrack, the time signature was changed to standard pop 4/4 time to make it more dance-friendly, although the intro is still in 5/4 time. The Limp Bizkit song "Take a Look Around" from the soundtrack to the second film was set to a similar 4/4 modification of the theme, with an interlude in 5/4.
