= CMPP =

CMPP may stand for:

- Canadian Motion Picture Park Studios, one of the largest and newest film production centers in North America
- Centre for Multidisciplinary Postgraduate Programmes, a center of the NED University of Engineering and Technology (Karachi, Pakistan) to provide cheap educational and professional in training to existing professionals.
- Certified Medical Publication Professional, an international professional qualification awarded by the International Society for Medical Publication Professionals (ISMPP)
- Communication, Media & Public Policy, a Magnet program of Skyline High School (Michigan) in Michigan
- Millennium Bureau of Canada, which was a temporary agency of the Government of Canada, to celebrate the "millennium" during the year 2000
- Moroccan Centre for Clean Manufacturing, an Arab centre to promote entrepreneurship
- China Mobile Peer to Peer, a binary message protocol used by China Mobile for SMS communication
- Cuban Medical Professional Parole program
