= Mission: Impossible – Operation Surma =

2003 video game

- Developers: Paradigm Entertainment; M4 Limited (GBA)
- Publisher: Atari
- Designer: Craig Bolin
- Composer: Robert Daspit
- Platforms: Game Boy Advance, Xbox, PlayStation 2, GameCube
- Release: Game Boy Advance, PlayStation 2, Xbox: EU: December 5, 2003; NA: December 9, 2003; GameCube: NA: March 23, 2004; EU: April 2, 2004
- Genres: Action-adventure, stealth
- Mode: Single-player

Mission: Impossible – Operation Surma is a 2003 action-adventure stealth video game developed by Paradigm Entertainment and published by Atari for Game Boy Advance, Xbox, PlayStation 2 and GameCube. The game takes place between Mission: Impossible 2 and Mission: Impossible III.

== Plot ==
IMF operative Ethan Hunt is scuba diving a shipwreck in the Black Sea. Two other scuba diving IMF agents give him an attachment to his goggles to show him his next mission briefing. Ethan will have to escort Mikail Marcou, a former advisor of Yugaria's dictator Simon Algo, and acquire a mini disk that contains vital information on Algo's operations. His team consists of Luther Stickell and Billy Baird from Mission: Impossible 2, and new agents Jasmine Curry, a former FBI agent, and master of disguise George Spelvin.

Ethan arrives at the Yugarian Ministry of Information and makes contact with Marcou. Before Ethan can extract him, Marcou is killed by Vasyl Berkut, the head of the Yugarian Secret Service. Ethan takes possession of the disk and pursues Berkut, but he escapes.

At Los Muertos Laboratories, Ethan disguises himself as a security guard, and Agent Spelvin disguises himself as a scientist. Ethan sees Jong Ho Li, a contractor and ally to Algo, and Sofia Ivanescu, a software engineer, come to download information onto the computer core. Ethan hacks the core, and Luther reveals Los Muertos' plan to use three strains of neurodioxin. Luther calls an abort, but Ethan stays behind to destroy the neurodioxin. When Jong Ho discovers this, he accuses Sofia of being a spy. He places bombs throughout the facility to cover his tracks, but Ethan disarms them. Outside, Sofia sabotages a helicopter, and leaves Jong Ho behind. Ethan kills Jong Ho and follows Sofia to Yugaria.

Sneaking back into Yugaria's Ministry of Information, Ethan learns of ICEWORM, a computer virus capable of breaking through any type of security system. Unable to get ICEWORM's codes through the computer, Berkut orders his men to apprehend Sofia to obtain the codes. Ethan overhears that Sofia's deceased father, Nicholas Ivanescu, is actually still alive. Ethan protects Sofia from Berkut's men, and they leave together.

Ethan, Sofia, Agent Curry, and Agent Spelvin travel to the Sansara prison, off the coast of North Africa, to destroy the remains of the neurodioxin. Curry and Spelvin meet with Berkut and enter the "Rat Trap". Meanwhile, Sofia tells Algo she developed ICEWORM as revenge for her father's apparent death at the hands of Yugaria's previous corrupt government. Ethan finds Sofia's father Nicholas alive in the prison, and he agrees to help Ethan destroy the neurodioxin. Ethan impersonates Berkut and disables the neurodioxin. Ethan witnesses Algo kill Agent Spelvin, injure Agent Curry, and take Sofia hostage. Ethan plants explosives in the lab, and escapes with Nicholas and Agent Curry.

Learning that Algo is using a plane as his headquarters, Ethan skydives and activates a jetpack to make his way to the plane. On board, Algo betrays and kills Berkut by using an experimental rocket launcher. Moments later, Ethan boards the plane and plants explosives on each wing of the plane. As Algo prepares to kill Sofia, she kicks him out of the plane, but he grabs her, and they fall out together. Ethan pursues the two, grabbing a parachute from one of Algo's men in the process. He rescues Sofia, and all three land on the SURMA Building, a company Algo runs as a front for his terrorist activities. On the roof, Algo uses an experimental invisibility device, but Ethan disrupts the technology and kills him.

Weeks after the incident, Ethan and Sofia are on a private cruise off the coast of Aruba. As Sofia says her dealings with technology are over, she and Ethan kiss, and the two go on a scuba diving adventure.

== Voice cast ==
Tom Cruise, who plays Ethan Hunt in the Mission: Impossible films, does not lend his likeness or voice to the character in the game. Veteran voice actor Steve Blum replaces him. Ving Rhames and John Polson reprise their roles of Luther Stickell and Billy Baird from Mission: Impossible 2 respectively.

== Reception ==
Reception

Aggregate score
Aggregator	Score			
Aggregator	GBA	GameCube	PS2	Xbox
Metacritic	42/100	64/100	64/100	67/100

Review scores
Publication	Score			
Publication	GBA	GameCube	PS2	Xbox
Electronic Gaming Monthly	N/A	N/A	6.33/10 (Note: Two critics of Electronic Gaming Monthly gave the PlayStation 2 and Xbox versions each a score of 6.5/10, and the other gave them 6/10.)	6.33/10
Eurogamer	N/A	N/A	5/10	N/A
Famitsu	N/A	28/40	28/40	N/A
Game Informer	6.25/10	N/A	7.75/10	7.75/10
GameSpot	5/10	N/A	7.3/10	7.3/10
GameSpy	1/5	N/A	2/5	2/5
GameZone	5/10	N/A	7/10	7.8/10
IGN	3.5/10	7.3/10	7.3/10	7.3/10
Nintendo Power	2.9/5	3.2/5	N/A	N/A
Official U.S. PlayStation Magazine	N/A	N/A	2/5	N/A
Official Xbox Magazine (US)	N/A	N/A	N/A	8.4/10
X-Play	1/5	N/A	N/A	3/5
Maxim	N/A	N/A	6/10	6/10

The game received "mixed or average reviews" on all platforms except the Game Boy Advance version, which received "generally unfavorable reviews", according to video game review aggregator Metacritic. Official Xbox Magazine gave the Xbox version a favorable review while it was still in development. In Japan, where the GameCube and PlayStation 2 versions were ported for release on March 25, 2004, Famitsu gave them each a score of all four sevens for a total of 28 out of 40. GamePro said of the Xbox version, "Atari's previous Mission Impossible games came out so long ago that the company was just settling into the Infogrames name, but this Mission soars head and shoulders above those PlayStation turkeys. You can expect Sam Fisher to smoke Ethan Hunt when Pandora Tomorrow comes out, but until then, Operation Surma is a great way to keep your stealth skills sharp." (Note: GamePro gave the Xbox version three 4/5 scores for graphics, control, and fun factor, and 4.5/5 for sound.)
