= Mission: Impossible – Rogue Nation =

2015 film by Christopher McQuarrie

- Theatrical release poster
- Directed by: Christopher McQuarrie
- Screenplay by: Christopher McQuarrie
- Story by: Christopher McQuarrie; Drew Pearce
- Based on: Mission: Impossible by Bruce Geller
- Produced by: Tom Cruise; J. J. Abrams; Bryan Burk; David Ellison; Dana Goldberg; Don Granger
- Starring: Tom Cruise; Jeremy Renner; Simon Pegg; Rebecca Ferguson; Ving Rhames; Sean Harris; Sagar Radia; Alec Baldwin
- Cinematography: Robert Elswit
- Edited by: Eddie Hamilton
- Music by: Joe Kraemer (Note: Mission: Impossible Theme composed by Lalo Schifrin)
- Production companies: Skydance Productions; Bad Robot; TC Productions; Alibaba Pictures
- Distributed by: Paramount Pictures
- Release dates: July 23, 2015 (Vienna State Opera); July 31, 2015 (United States)
- Running time: 131 minutes
- Country: United States
- Language: English
- Budget: $150 million
- Box office: $710.9 million

Mission: Impossible – Rogue Nation is a 2015 American action spy film written and directed by Christopher McQuarrie. It is the sequel to Mission: Impossible – Ghost Protocol (2011) and the fifth installment in the Mission: Impossible film series. The film stars Tom Cruise, Jeremy Renner, Simon Pegg, Ving Rhames, Rebecca Ferguson, Sean Harris, Sagar Radia and Alec Baldwin. In the film, Impossible Missions Force agent Ethan Hunt (Cruise) and his IMF team, who, subsequent to their disbandment and Hunt's pursuit by the Central Intelligence Agency, must fight The Syndicate, an international group of rogue government agents.

McQuarrie, who completed uncredited rewrites for Mission: Impossible – Ghost Protocol, was announced as the director of Mission: Impossible – Rogue Nation in August 2013. The returns of Cruise, Renner, Pegg and Rhames were confirmed by July 2014 while the screenplay was also developed by Pearce and Will Staples; it was ultimately solely credited to McQuarrie, with Pearce receiving story credit. Ferguson, Harris and Baldwin rounded out the cast that October. Principal photography was from August 2014 to March 2015, in key locations including London, Vienna, Casablanca, and at Leavesden Studios in Hertfordshire, UK. The film's official title was revealed in March 2015.

Mission: Impossible – Rogue Nation premiered at the Vienna State Opera (one of its filming locations) on July 23, 2015, and was theatrically released in the United States by Paramount Pictures a week later. The film received positive reviews for McQuarrie's direction, screenplay, action sequences, and the performances of Cruise, Pegg, and Ferguson. It grossed $710.9 million worldwide, becoming the eighth-highest-grossing film of 2015 and the then-highest-grossing film in the franchise. A sequel, Mission: Impossible – Fallout, was released in 2018.

== Plot ==
IMF Agent Ethan Hunt intercepts a shipment of nerve gas being moved from Minsk by The Syndicate, a secret consortium of rogue field operatives from various intelligence agencies that he has been tracking. At an IMF station in London, The Syndicate compromises the briefing. Before being gassed unconscious, he is forced to watch a blond man wearing glasses kill the station operative.

In Washington D.C., CIA Director Alan Hunley convinces a Senate committee to decommission the IMF and assimilate all the assets into the CIA after their actions caused destructive events in Russia. (Note: As depicted in Mission: Impossible – Ghost Protocol (2011).) Agents Benji Dunn and William Brandt are forced to work for the CIA under strict scrutiny, while hacker Luther Stickell resigns in protest. Ethan awakes and is tortured by ex-KGB agent Janik "Bone Doctor" Vinter. He escapes with the help of Ilsa Faust, an undercover British MI6 agent. Six months later, Ethan, a wanted fugitive for refusing to turn himself over to the CIA, covertly passes information about The Syndicate to Benji and arranges his tickets to Turandot, performed at the Vienna State Opera. Upon Benji's arrival in Vienna, Ethan asks him to help track down the blond man who killed the IMF station operative in London.

At the opera, they encounter Ilsa and several other Syndicate agents there to assassinate the Chancellor of Austria. Ethan prevents the hit and escapes with Ilsa, only to witness the Chancellor being killed by a car bomb. Chased by Syndicate agents, Ethan and Benji are forced to release Ilsa to protect her cover. Hunley wrongfully blames both Ethan and Benji for the assassination and orders the Special Activities Division to capture or kill them both. Brandt finds Luther and convinces him to help him locate both Ethan and Benji before the CIA does.

Ethan and Benji find Ilsa in Casablanca, where she identifies Ethan's suspect as the rogue MI6 agent and leader of The Syndicate, Solomon Lane. The three then infiltrate an underwater vault beneath a power plant to retrieve a digital ledger stolen from Lane that purportedly contains the names of all Syndicate operatives. However, Ilsa flees with the data to London and meets her handler, MI6 Chief Atlee, who discreetly deletes the data and forces her to continue her undercover assignment.

Later, Benji and Ethan are found by Luther and Brandt. Luther discovers that the data, which was copied by Benji earlier before finding Ilsa, is an encrypted British government virtual red box that requires the biometrics of the prime minister of the United Kingdom to unlock it. They all travel to London, but Lane's men abduct Benji during the team's meeting with Ilsa at King's Cross railway station and use him to blackmail Ethan into decrypting and delivering the data to him. Despite Brandt's protests, Ethan accepts the mission. Brandt secretly reveals their location to Hunley.

In Oxford, Hunley, Brandt, and Ethan (disguised as Atlee) meet the Prime Minister, who confirms that The Syndicate was a secret black project proposed by Atlee to recruit former intelligence agents and perform illegal missions without oversight and zero accountability, which the Prime Minister unequivocally rejected. Ethan tranquilizes the Prime Minister; he and Brandt secure the Prime Minister's biometrics, allowing Luther to decrypt the file. When the real Atlee arrives, Ethan and Brandt force him to admit that he secretly started The Syndicate without the Prime Minister's knowledge before Lane hijacked it, after which Atlee tried to frame Ilsa.

When decrypting the file, the red box actually contains access to £2.4 billion in numerous accounts. Ethan destroys the data after deducing that Lane plans to fund The Syndicate with the money. Arriving at the meeting place arranged by Lane, Ethan finds Benji strapped to a bomb and wearing a headset and contact lens camera to serve as Lane's proxy alongside Ilsa. Ethan tells Lane that he has memorized the data and offers himself in exchange for Benji's safety. Benji escapes after Lane remotely disarms the bomb while Vinter's men chase Ethan and Ilsa through the Tower of London. Ilsa kills Vinter while Lane, who pursues Ethan, is lured into a bulletproof glass cell and gassed unconscious.

Having witnessed an IMF success firsthand, Hunley returns to the Senate committee and claims that their previous meeting served as the first part of an elaborate plan to help Ethan and his team expose and bring down The Syndicate, persuading the committee to restore the IMF. After the meeting, Brandt welcomes Hunley as the new IMF Secretary.

== Cast ==
- Tom Cruise as Ethan Hunt: An agent of the Impossible Mission Force (IMF).
- Jeremy Renner as William Brandt: An IMF Agent and intelligence analyst transferred to the CIA when the IMF is disbanded.
- Simon Pegg as Benji Dunn: An IMF technical field agent transferred to the CIA's cyber operations division when the IMF is disbanded.
- Rebecca Ferguson as Ilsa Faust: A disavowed MI6 Agent undercover in The Syndicate.
- Ving Rhames as Luther Stickell: An IMF Agent, Ethan's closest friend and computer hacker who retires when the IMF is disbanded and returns when Brandt calls him for help finding Hunt.
- Sean Harris as Solomon Lane: An ex-MI6 Agent who became the leader of The Syndicate.
- Simon McBurney as Atlee: MI6 Director and founder of The Syndicate.
- Zhang Jingchu as Lauren: A CIA analyst.
- Tom Hollander as the Prime Minister of the United Kingdom.
- Jens Hultén as Janik "Bone Doctor" Vinter: An ex-KGB Agent turned Syndicate operative and Lane's second-in-command.
- Alec Baldwin as Alan Hunley: The Director of the CIA, who initially doubted the Syndicate's existence, leading to the shutdown of the IMF and framing Hunt as an alleged terrorist.
- Hermione Corfield as an IMF agent working at a London record shop who is killed by Lane.
- Sagar Radia as a controlled lab technician.

Additional cast includes Robert Maaser as Richter, a KSA agent turned Syndicate operative assigned to kill Ilsa if she fails to kill the Chancellor; Wolfgang Stegemann as Kagan, a Mossad agent turned Syndicate operative who fights Hunt at the Vienna State Opera; Alec Utgoff as the crewman of the A400 cargo plane carrying nerve gas; Mateo Rufino and Fernando Abadie as low-level Chechen separatists piloting the A400; and Rupert Wickham as the Austrian chancellor.

== Production ==
=== Development ===
Paramount Pictures announced in August 2013 that Christopher McQuarrie would direct the fifth Mission: Impossible film, from a script by Drew Pearce, with Tom Cruise reprising his role as Ethan Hunt. TC Productions and Bad Robot would produce and Skydance Productions, who served as co-financers and executive producers of Mission: Impossible – Ghost Protocol, will work closely with the team in the development and production process". On November 14, 2013, Paramount announced a release date of December 25, 2015. The same month, Simon Pegg confirmed he would reprise his role as Benji. In May 2014, Will Staples replaced Pearce as screenwriter. Also that month, Jeremy Renner confirmed he was returning in the role of William Brandt, and Cruise said the film would shoot in London, with a later report saying it would first shoot in Vienna in August. At some point, McQuarrie replaced Staples as screenwriter; the final credits list McQuarrie as screenwriter, with story by Pearce.

Earlier script drafts of the film by Drew Pearce included an opening sequence set in the 1960s. The character of Dan Briggs from the first season of the original TV series was also considered to return, but his role was given to new character Ilsa Faust instead as McQuarrie didn't want to include fan service for the sake of it. Bryan Burk also attempted to include Martin Landau in the film but plans ultimately fell through. Jessica Chastain was reportedly offered the role of Ilsa Faust, but she declined.

In July 2014, Rebecca Ferguson was cast and Alec Baldwin was in talks for the film. Baldwin was confirmed to have joined the cast in August 2014, and Ving Rhames was confirmed to be reprising his role of Luther Stickell. On September 5, it was announced that Sean Harris was in negotiations for the villain role. On October 2, Simon McBurney joined the cast of the film. On October 6, Chinese actress Zhang Jingchu joined the film's cast (she only appears for 30 seconds in the finished film). On March 22, 2015, Paramount revealed the film's official title, Mission: Impossible – Rogue Nation, along with a teaser poster and trailer.

Cruise chose Ferguson for the role of Ilsa Faust after watching her in the miniseries The White Queen (2013) and noticing a resemblance between her and Ingrid Bergman. Bergman's spy character in Notorious (1946) was one of Ferguson's inspirations for her role in Rogue Nation after Cruise sent her a copy of Notorious along with other Alfred Hitchcock films on DVD. The name Ilsa Faust is also a tribute to Bergman's character in Casablanca (1942), Ilsa Lund, which was also a spy.

=== Filming ===
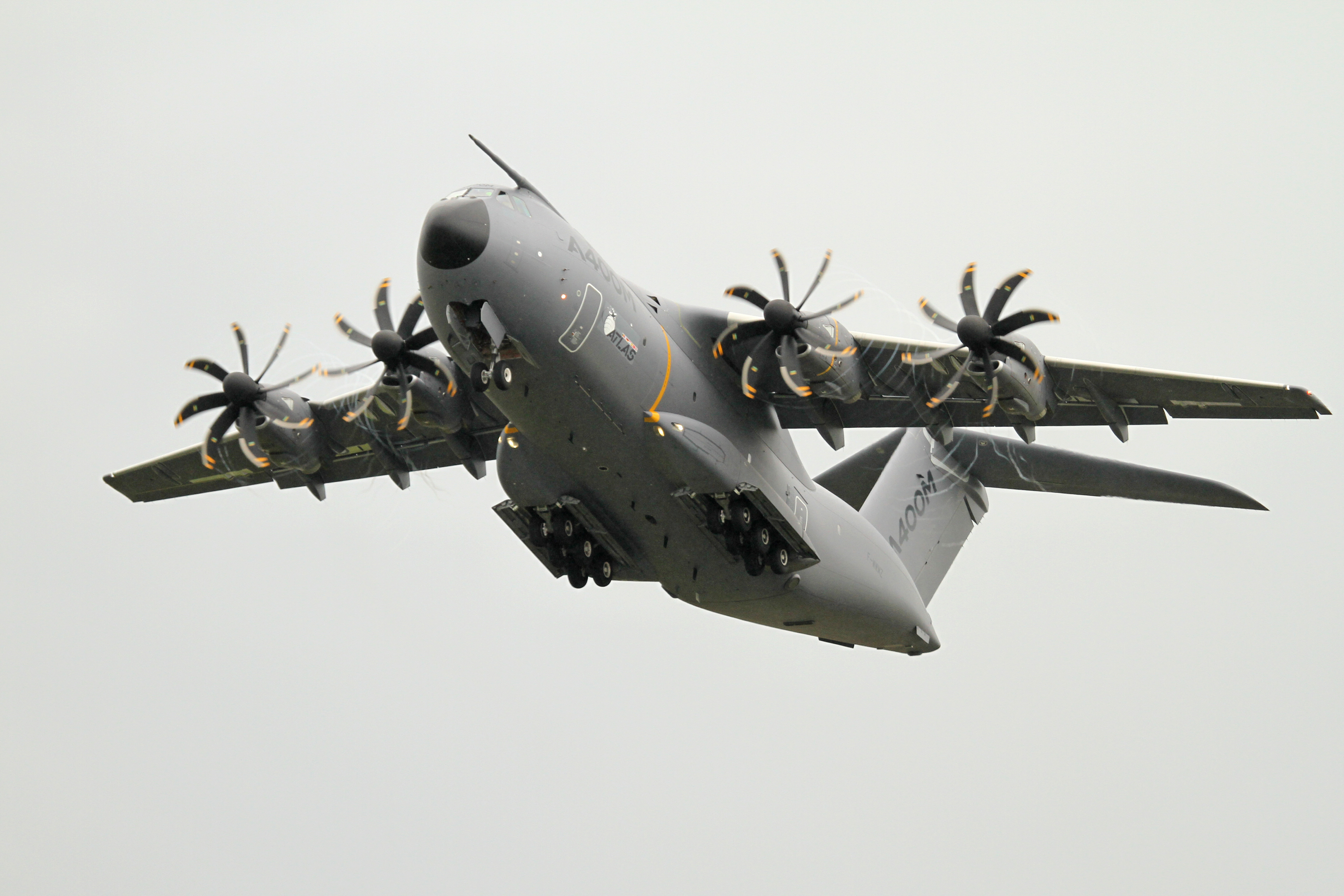
This particular Airbus A400M Atlas, registered F-WWMZ, was used to film the action scene at RAF Wittering.

Principal photography began in August 2014. On August 21, the production released its first photos from the set in Vienna, Austria. In August actors Cruise and Pegg, along with director Christopher McQuarrie, were in Vienna, at the Metro and on the roof-top of Vienna State Opera. After finishing one and a half weeks of filming in Austria, on August 30, Cruise arrived in the Moroccan capital city of Rabat for filming more scenes. Here the Marrakesh Highway was closed for fourteen days (August 30 – September 12). Other filming locations in Morocco include Agadir, Rabat and Casablanca. On September 8 and 9, filming took place in the Marrakesh Stadium, which was closed both days for filming purposes, and Kasbah of the Udayas, in Rabat.

After more than a month of shooting in Austria and Morocco, filming moved to London on September 28. Filming of an action scene featuring Ethan Hunt climbing and hanging on the outside of a flying Airbus A400M Atlas took place at RAF Wittering near Stamford. Tom Cruise performed the sequence, at times suspended on the aircraft over 5,000 feet (1,500 m) in the air, without the use of a stunt double. To pull off this particular stunt, the production team were given a limited period of only 48 hours. The plane took off and landed 8 times before they had the perfect shot.

On November 9, filming began on Southampton Water, and Fawley Power Station. Tom Cruise trained under diving specialist Kirk Krack to be able to hold his breath for three minutes to perform an underwater sequence which was filmed in a single long take without any edits (though the scene in the movie was cut with several breaks, giving the impression for the scene having several takes). However, stunt coordinator Wade Eastwood claims that Cruise held his breath for just over six minutes.

Some footage also took place at Leavesden Studios in the UK, with the crew spending a month filming footage in Leavesden's underwater tank. The tank was approximately forty feet in length, and circular tracks were constructed around its drive bays in order to attach the camera and dolly. Other footage shot at Leavesden included additional insert shots, shots of Cruise running through grass which were filmed using a Technocrane, and several crowd shots. On February 20, 2015, The Hollywood Reporter said filming was halted to give McQuarrie, Cruise, and an unknown third person time to rework the film's ending. Filming ended on March 12, 2015.

== Music ==
The musical score for Mission: Impossible – Rogue Nation was composed by Joe Kraemer, who had previously collaborated with director McQuarrie on The Way of the Gun and Jack Reacher. Kraemer was announced as the composer for the film in September 2014. The soundtrack was recorded with small orchestral sections at British Grove Studios and with full orchestra at Abbey Road Studios. As well as incorporating Lalo Schifrin's thematic material from the television series throughout the score, three tracks ("Escape to Danger", "A Matter of Going", and "Finale and Curtain Call") interpolate Puccini's Nessun dorma aria from his opera Turandot, featured in the opera house scene.

The physical soundtrack was released by La-La Land Records on July 24, 2015, with the digital album made available from Paramount Music on the same day.

== Release ==
Paramount had originally scheduled the film for a December 25, 2015, release. On January 26, 2015, Paramount advanced the release date to July 31, 2015. The main reason cited by The Hollywood Reporter was to avoid competition with two other 2015 films, Star Wars: The Force Awakens and Spectre. In the United States and Canada, it was released in the Dolby Vision format in Dolby Cinema, the first-ever time for Paramount. On February 13, 2015, Paramount and IMAX Corporation announced that they would digitally remaster the film into the IMAX format and release it in IMAX theaters worldwide on the scheduled date. It was released in North America on July 31, 2015. Lotte released the film in South Korea on July 30, 2015. It was released in China on September 8, 2015.

In August 2015, Fox Networks acquired the American cable broadcast rights, for broadcast after its theatrical release. The film is available for FX Networks and its suite of networks: FX, FXX, FXM, as well as the video-on-demand platform FXNow.

=== Marketing ===
Paramount Pictures spent $42 million on advertising for the film.

A comic book was released in conjunction with the film's DVD/Blu-ray release. It follows Hunt going rogue during the events of the film. The comic is written by the film's writer and director Christopher McQuarrie and illustrated by Lazarus artist Owen Freeman.

=== Home media ===
Mission: Impossible – Rogue Nation was released on Blu-ray and DVD on December 15, 2015, in the United States. A 4K Ultra HD Blu-ray was released on June 26, 2018, along with the first four films.

== Reception ==
=== Box office ===
Mission: Impossible – Rogue Nation grossed $195 million in the U.S. and Canada, and $515.9 million in other countries, for a worldwide total of $710.9 million. It was the eighth-highest-grossing film of 2015. It became the highest-grossing Mission: Impossible film and the biggest movie for Cruise at the time until Fallout (2018). It had a worldwide opening of $121 million and an IMAX worldwide opening total of $12.5 million (the third-biggest of July behind The Dark Knight Rises (2012) and Harry Potter and the Deathly Hallows – Part 2 (2011)). Deadline Hollywood calculated the net profit of the film to be $108.9 million, when factoring together all expenses and revenues for the film.

==== United States and Canada ====
In the United States and Canada, according to pre-release tracking, the film was projected to earn around $40–50 million in its opening weekend, less than what the first three Mission: Impossible films earned in their initial weekend. It made $4 million from its Thursday night showings which began at 8 p.m. from 2,764 theaters, and $20.3 million on its opening day, which is the second-biggest opening day for Cruise (behind War of the Worlds) and the biggest in the Mission: Impossible franchise (breaking Mission: Impossible 2's record), with 16% of ticket sales from the film's 367 IMAX theaters. In its opening weekend, the film grossed $55.5 million exceeding expectations and is the second-highest opening in the franchise, behind Mission: Impossible 2 ($57.8 million) and the third-biggest for Cruise behind War of the Worlds ($64.8 million) and Mission: Impossible 2. IMAX contributed $8.4 million of the total opening gross from 369 IMAX screens which is the third-best for a July opening after The Dark Knight Rises ($19 million) and Harry Potter and the Deathly Hallows – Part 2 ($15.2 million). Premium large format grossed up $2.6 million, 13% of Friday's gross with Cinemark XD grossing close to $700,000 at 108 screens. It remained at the top spot for the second weekend earning an estimated $28.5 million (down 48.7%) from 3,988 theaters (32+ theaters) buoyed by word of mouth, rapturous reviews and strong plays at IMAX theaters. Revenues from IMAX also dropped steadily by 39% to $4.3 million in its second weekend. It topped the North American box office for two consecutive weekends until surpassed by the music biographical drama Straight Outta Compton in its third weekend. It ended its theatrical run on October 29, 2015, playing in theaters for a total of 91 days, or 13 weeks, earning a total of $195 million at the North American box office which is just 28.6% of its total worldwide gross. It is the fourth-highest-grossing Mission: Impossible film behind Mission: Impossible – Fallout ($220 million), Mission: Impossible 2 ($215 million) and Mission: Impossible – Ghost Protocol ($209 million).

==== Other countries ====
Elsewhere, the film opened in 40 international markets including 135 IMAX theaters on July 31, 2015, in big markets such the United Kingdom, Mexico, and Australia. It grossed $64.5 million in its opening weekend and went No. 1 in 33 markets and IMAX contributed $4.1 million of its international opening. Revenues from its second weekend increased by 0.5% to $65 million. It added 18 new markets including India, Japan, and Russia and opened at No. 1 in 17 of the 18 markets with the exception of Japan where it was behind Jurassic World. Overall, it opened at No. 1 in 55 of the 63 territories it has been released in and had the biggest opening weekend ever for the franchise in 46 markets and Cruise's best opening in 40 markets. It topped the box office outside of North America for three consecutive weekends before being overtaken by Paramount's own Terminator Genisys in its fourth weekend and four in total.

It had the biggest opening for the franchise in the UK, Ireland and Malta ($8.3 million), France ($7 million), India ($7.5 million), Japan ($6.1 million), Russia and the CIS ($5.3 million), Mexico ($5 million), the Middle East ($4.7; including $2.5 million from UAE alone), Taiwan ($5.1 million), Australia ($3.8 million), Germany ($3.2 million), Brazil ($3.1 million) and Pakistan ($1 million). In South Korea, where the franchise has been a hit it opened to $16.95 million (49% above Ghost Protocol), which is the second-biggest opening ever for Paramount, behind Transformers: Dark of the Moon; Cruise's biggest-ever opening; the best for the Mission: Impossible franchise; and the second-biggest opening for a Western film of 2015. It added $8.1 and $3.7 million in its second and third weekend for a total of $41.1 million making South Korea the film's second-highest market followed by Japan ($41.2 million), the United Kingdom ($32 million), France ($20.9 million), and Germany ($13 million). In Japan, it faced competition with the continued run of Jurassic World. In China, Rogue Nation emerged very successful and earned $18.5 million on its opening day of September 8 (including $1.4 million from midnight screenings), which is the country's biggest opening for a Hollywood 2D film, the second-biggest for any 2D film in China (only behind the $22.2 million debut of local 2D film Pancake Man), and the fifth-biggest opening for any film. Despite opening on a Tuesday—during which most children are off to school—the film opened successfully and almost matched the opening figure of North America. Rob Cain of Forbes cited out possible reasons for the successful opening: the well-establishment of the franchise in China (its immediate predecessor Ghost Protocol earned $102.7 million), rapid expansion and growth of Chinese movie market, being the second Hollywood movie (after Terminator Genisys) to be released after the nearly 60-day blackout period in which non-Chinese movies were dabarred from going to general release in the country, and the successful awareness campaign and marketing efforts by the team including Tom Cruise visiting several Chinese cities. It went on to earn an estimated $85.8 million through its opening weekend (Tuesday–Sunday) from 5,500 screens. It is the highest-grossing 2D Hollywood film there with $136.8 million (breaking Interstellar's record). Rogue Nation was projected to make roughly 70% of its worldwide gross abroad, and indeed ended up making $487,287,762 or 71.4% of its entire worldwide gross overseas which is the second highest among the series.

=== Critical response ===
On the review aggregator Rotten Tomatoes, Mission: Impossible – Rogue Nation has a rating of 94% based on 328 reviews and an average rating of 7.50/10. The website's critical consensus reads, "Mission: Impossible Rogue Nation continues the franchise's thrilling resurgence—and proves that Tom Cruise remains an action star without equal." Metacritic gives the film a score of 75 out of 100 based on 46 critics, indicating "generally favorable reviews". Audiences surveyed by CinemaScore gave the film a grade of "A−" on an A+ to F scale.

Ty Burr of The Boston Globe called the film "preposterously enjoyable" and said that it "unfolds with fluid, twisty, old-school pleasure," highlighting the performances of Cruise, Pegg, Ferguson, and Baldwin and comparing the action scenes to those of the James Bond films as well as Alfred Hitchcock's The Man Who Knew Too Much (1956). He ultimately gave the film 3 out of 4 stars. Richard Roeper of the Chicago Sun-Times gave Rogue Nation 3.5 out of 4 stars, highly praising the film's cast and stating that the film "keeps topping itself". However, he criticized the villain for not being too memorable or intimidating. Kenneth Turan of the Los Angeles Times said that McQuarrie's direction allowed Rogue Nation to stand out among the other films in terms of action and its inclusion of female characters, singling out Ferguson's Ilsa as uniquely empowered and action-oriented, also praising her scenes with Cruise. Christopher Orr of The Atlantic praised Cruise, saying "You overcome the impossible through the application of sheer, unvarnished willpower, a quality that Cruise has always possessed in abundance" and describing him as the driving force of the film and the franchise. He, too, praised Ferguson among the supporting cast for her role as an action heroine. Joseph Wigler of MTV.com considered the movie as "one of the most entertaining Ethan Hunt adventures" which proves that "the franchise still has plenty of fight left in it, with no signs of slowing down." He praised the performances of Cruise and Ferguson, applauding the latter for playing "the most fascinating character in the entire movie" and "one of the most complicated and alluring characters in the entire five film series." Manohla Dargis of The New York Times stated "Sleek and bloated, specific and generic, 'Rogue Nation' is pretty much like most of the 'Impossible' movies in that it's an immense machine that Mr. McQuarrie, after tinkering and oiling, has cranked up again and set humming with twists and turns, global trotting and gadgets, a crack supporting cast and a hard-working star."

A. A. Dowd of The A.V. Club remarked, "Rather than go full auteur on his formulaic material, McQuarrie instead offers a kind of greatest-hits package: 'Rogue Nation' marries the shifting loyalties of Brian De Palma's original to the kinetic action beats of John Woo's series nadir and the all-set-piece structure of Brad Bird's series zenith, adding an omnipotent villain not far removed from the one Philip Seymour Hoffman played in J.J. Abrams' entry. It's the least visually or conceptually distinctive of the five movies, leaning on what's worked before rather than forging its own path." Chris Nashawaty of Entertainment Weekly gave the film a B+, calling it "breathlessly thrilling" and giving high praise to its action sequences, saying "all you can do is pick your jaw off your lap and grin at the breathtakingly bananas spectacle you've just witnessed." Meanwhile, David Edelstein of Vulture.com called Ferguson the "best reason" to see the film. However, he felt it did not surpass its predecessor and singled out several elements of some of the action sequences for criticism. Joe Morgenstern of The Wall Street Journal also praised Ferguson but felt that she and Cruise had "zero chemistry" onscreen. Nonetheless, he praised the film for working "ingenious changes on old tropes". Daniel Krupa of IGN only gave the film a score of 7/10, praising the action sequences and the performances of the central cast but criticizing it for not adding enough to the series or expanding on the plot of Ghost Protocol. Chris Evangelista from /Film commented in July 2023 in the wake of Mission: Impossible – Dead Reckoning Part One the effects from the introduction of Rebecca Ferguson's character Ilsa Faust in Rogue Nation as "a smart, sexy, highly capable spy playing all angles." He called her "a great character" and "something of a revelation to the franchise – someone who could go toe to toe with Ethan Hunt." Concluding Evangelista observed that Ilsa Faust became "a fan favorite, thanks to how complex the character was written, how much she kicked ass, and Ferguson's compelling, sleek performance."

=== Accolades ===
Accolades received by Mission: Impossible – Rogue Nation
Award	Date of ceremony	Category	Recipient(s)	Result	Ref.
Critics' Choice Movie Awards	January 17, 2016	Best Action Movie	Mission: Impossible – Rogue Nation	Nominated	
Critics' Choice Movie Awards	January 17, 2016	Best Actor in an Action Movie	Tom Cruise	Nominated	
Critics' Choice Movie Awards	January 17, 2016	Best Actress in an Action Movie	Rebecca Ferguson	Nominated	
Empire Awards	March 20, 2016	Best Thriller	Mission: Impossible – Rogue Nation	Nominated	
Empire Awards	March 20, 2016	Best Female Newcomer	Rebecca Ferguson	Nominated	
Golden Reel Awards	February 27, 2016	Outstanding Achievement in Sound Editing – Feature Underscore	John Finklea	Nominated	
Golden Trailer Awards	May 4, 2016	Best Action TV Spot	"Fate Alt Rev." (Trailer Park, Inc.)	Won	
Golden Trailer Awards	May 4, 2016	Best Music TV Spot	"Fate Alt Rev." (Trailer Park, Inc.)	Nominated	
Golden Trailer Awards	May 4, 2016	Best Summer Blockbuster TV Spot	"Live Obstacle Course" (Grandesign)	Nominated	
Golden Trailer Awards	May 4, 2016	Best Viral Campaign	"Live Obstacle Course" (Grandesign)	Nominated	
Golden Trailer Awards	May 4, 2016	Most Innovative Advertising for a Feature Film	"Live Obstacle Course" (Grandesign)	Won	
International Film Music Critics Association Awards	February 18, 2016	Best Original Score for an Action/Adventure/Thriller Film	Joe Kraemer	Won	
London Film Critics Circle Awards	January 17, 2016	Technical Achievement Award	Wade Eastwood (stunts)	Nominated	
Movieguide Awards	February 5, 2016	Best Movies for Mature Audiences	Mission: Impossible – Rogue Nation	Nominated	
Saturn Awards	June 22, 2016	Best Action or Adventure Film	Mission: Impossible – Rogue Nation	Nominated	
Saturn Awards	June 22, 2016	Best Supporting Actor	Simon Pegg	Nominated	
Screen Actors Guild Awards	January 30, 2016	Outstanding Performance by a Stunt Ensemble in a Motion Picture	Mission: Impossible – Rogue Nation	Nominated	
Visual Effects Society Awards	February 2, 2016	Outstanding Virtual Cinematography in a Photoreal Project	Vincent Aupetit, Margaux Durand-Rival, Christopher Anciaume, and Robert Elswit for "Underwater Torus Chamber"	Nominated	
World Soundtrack Awards	October 19, 2016	Discovery of the Year	Joe Kraemer	Won	

== Sequel ==
By May 2015, Paramount was developing a sixth Mission: Impossible film, with Cruise, Abrams, Ellison, and Goldberg returning to produce, along with Don Granger and Matt Grimm executive producing, and Elizabeth Raposo overseeing development. Christopher McQuarrie returned to write and direct the film, which began filming April 2017 for a July 2018 release.
