= Canadian Motion Picture Park Studios =

Film production center in British Columbia, Canada

Canadian Motion Picture Park Studios (CMPP) is one of the largest and newest film production centers in North America with over 350,000 square feet of facilities including 18 stages. Located in Burnaby, British Columbia, in the metropolitan area of Vancouver, the eighteen stages are state-of-the-art and purpose-built for film and television production. The CMPP complex has been home to a wide variety of production projects, including high-budget feature films, television series, and commercials. The eighteen stages range in size from 7,000 square feet to 42,000 square feet. The complex includes a unique Back Lot with North American streets, plus extensive support facilities, and speciality shops for construction, carpentry, paint, mechanical and lock-ups for props. The complex includes stages CMPP, Pacific Studios, MJA, and CinePrep Studio.

== Partial credit list ==
=== Movies ===
- Skyscraper (2018 film)
- Alpha (2018 film)
- Fifty Shades Darker (2017)
- Bobsville Two (2015)
- Godzilla (2014)
- Mission: Impossible – Ghost Protocol (2011)
- Watchmen (2009)
- TRON: Legacy (2010)
- The Twilight Saga: Breaking dawn Part 1 (2011)
- Twilight Saga: Eclipse (2010)
- The Twilight Saga: New Moon (2009)
- I, Robot (2004)
- Red Riding Hood (2011)
- The Core (2003)
- RV (2006)
- Bobsville (film) (2006)
- Firewall (2006)
- Exorcism of Emily Rose (2005)
- Eragon (2006)
- Hot Tub Time Machine (2010)
- Little Man (2006)
- Cats & Dogs (2001)
- Charlie St. Cloud (2010)
- Deck the Halls (2006)

=== TV shows ===
- Supernatural (2005-2020)
- Legends of Tomorrow (2014-)
- A Series of Unfortunate Events (2017–18)
- Lucifer (2014-2021)
- Trial and Error (2017-2018)
- True Justice (2010)
- Godiva's (2005-2006)
- Mr. Young (2010-)
- Battlestar Galactica (2004-2009)
- Stargate Universe (2009-2011)

=== Commercials ===
- Mattel
- Target Corporation
- A&W
- BC Hydro
- Fischer Price
- Lexus
- Hyundai
- Playskool
- Taco Bell
- Kitchen Aid
- Gillette
- Rolex
- Western Digital

== Facilities ==
=== Stages ===
CMPP Studios has 18 sound stages ranging from 42,000 sq. ft.to 7,000 sq. ft., including a mega-stage, a perfectly square stage, and smaller insert studios. The stages offer sound deadening, laser-smooth floors, clear-spans to 40' heights, and trusses designed for heavy loads. The complex has its own custom-built power stations to meet the heavy power demands of the film industry. In addition, there are custom-built, computer-controlled air exchange systems.

=== Back lot ===
CMPP also offers a 10-acre back lot that includes six American City streets. An additional 80,000 square feet of facilities on the back lot is available for construction, painting, wardrobe, set-dec/prop storage and SFX. The six buildings include a 40,000 square foot warehouse with 8,000 square feet of office space. There are two acres of parking space available.

=== Support facilities and services ===
CMPP has over 70,000 sq. ft. of office and support space, including furnished offices, both cubicle and private, meeting rooms, kitchens, and utility areas scattered throughout the facilities. In addition CMPP offers security, VoIP phone systems, IT support, and janitorial services
