= Luther Stickell =

- Mission: Impossible character
- Ving Rhames as Luther Stickell in Mission: Impossible III
- First appearance: Mission: Impossible (1996)
- Last appearance: Mission: Impossible – The Final Reckoning (2025)
- Created by: David Koepp; Robert Towne; Steven Zaillian
- Portrayed by: Ving Rhames
- Voiced by: Ving Rhames (Operation Surma); John Eric Bentley (Lego Dimensions)

In-universe information
- Nicknames: The Net Ranger; Phineas Phreak
- Gender: Male
- Occupation: IMF Agent
- Nationality: American

Luther Stickell is a fictional character in the Mission: Impossible film series who first appeared in the 1996 film Mission: Impossible and is the only character besides Ethan Hunt to appear in all eight films.

In the films, Luther is an expert computer hacker who works for the IMF (Impossible Missions Force) division of the CIA alongside Ethan Hunt. He is portrayed by Ving Rhames.

== Appearances ==
Over the course of the series, Luther's character goes from being a soft-spoken, down-to-business and reliable team member to being Ethan's most trusted friend and confidant.

=== Movies ===
==== Mission: Impossible ====
IMF Agent Ethan Hunt (portrayed by Tom Cruise) is "disavowed" by the IMF following a botched mission in Prague, a "mole hunt" for an agent who plans to steal the CIA's non-official cover (NOC) list, a detailed file of all the IMF agents situated in Eastern Europe. Framed as the mole, with only his teammate Claire Phelps alive, Ethan plots to steal a copy of the list to lure the real traitor out of hiding. Ethan enlists the help of two other "disavowed" IMF agents: Luther Stickell and Franz Krieger (portrayed by Jean Reno). Stickell is told he has been chosen as "Cyber-Ops". Reluctant at first, Luther is baited into the hack when Ethan plays to Stickell's ego, reminding Luther of his reputation in the hacking/phreaking community (he was nicknamed "The Net Ranger" and "Phineas Phreak" due to his skills), bringing up his greatest achievement (being "the only man alive who hacked NATO Ghost Com") and selling the upcoming job proposal as "the Mount Everest of hacks". Posing as a team of firefighters, the rogue IMF group breaches the CIA and infiltrates the main computer mainframe via a remote terminal in Langley, Virginia. In order to gain access to the floor with the NOC list, Luther hacks into the building's computer-controlled electrical system, triggering the fire alarm on that floor. Because of his agility, Ethan performs the physical act of obtaining the information himself but has Luther, in his ear via headset, instructing him on performing the hack. Luther provides the password needed to log in at the terminal, having seen it being entered via a camera built into Ethan's eyeglasses. After obtaining the list, Ethan discovers that his team leader Jim Phelps not only survived the initial mission in Prague, but also is the real mole. He is the man responsible for framing Ethan, despite Jim's insistence that CIA Director Kittridge is the mole. After learning this from Ethan, Luther helps him double-cross Claire and Jim together. Aboard a train headed for Paris, the arms dealer called Max (Ethan's buyer of the NOC list) and her bodyguard are caught with the stolen data, the CIA drops their case against Ethan and reinstates him, along with Luther. While celebrating with Ethan at a British pub, Luther proclaims he is "the flavor of the month", indicating that the CIA is now treating him like royalty thanks to his help. At the same time, he muses that he is "gonna miss being disreputable" as he is no longer in hiding and incapable of the illegal computer activities he was privy to performing before being reinstated. Before going their separate ways, Ethan smiles and tells Luther that, if it makes him feel any better, he will always see Luther in that light.

==== Mission: Impossible 2 ====
In Mission: Impossible 2, Hunt eagerly recruits Luther (along with IMF Agent Billy Baird) to help stop Sean Ambrose, a former IMF agent, from unleashing a deadly virus (code-named, "Chimera" after the mythological beast) upon Sydney, Australia. This time around, Luther utilizes GPS tracking satellites to keep tabs on Nyah Nordoff-Hall, a GPS-bugged mole they have planted inside of Ambrose's complex. As the mission progresses, Ethan enlists Nyah to lift a memory card containing information on the virus from Ambrose's jacket so that Luther can analyze the virus and its capabilities. Luther also provides Ethan with an entrance to a biological lab in the city of Sydney through a jammed-open vent on the roof by hacking into the building's computer-controlled electronics system. During the infiltration of the building, however, Luther is nearly killed when one of Ambrose's men plants a bomb on the underside of the van Luther is using as an observation station in an attempt to trap Ethan in the building without a second pair of eyes to get him out. Luther manages to escape just in time with only some cuts and bruises but finds that his main laptop is damaged in the bombing and that the rest of his computer equipment has been destroyed. After repairing it, he eventually assists Ethan in infiltrating an island complex where Nyah has been tracked and Ambrose is selling the virus. Luther helps Ethan find his way around once the fight moves above ground but backs off when the helicopter he is in comes under fire by Ambrose's troops. He eventually injects Nyah with the cure to the virus (symbolically named, "Bellerophon" after the Greek hero who managed to slay the Chimera according to myth) and helps Ethan escort her safely away from Ambrose.

==== Mission: Impossible III ====
In Mission: Impossible III, Luther reunites with a semi-retired and engaged Ethan Hunt to help rescue Ethan's kidnapped protégé, Lindsay Farris. Along with being Ethan's usual "second set of eyes" and manning his routes through the building from a van, Luther also activates and utilizes remote-controlled sentry machine guns in order to cause chaos and confusion so that Ethan does not have to bother taking out several armed and alert men under pressure. He asks Ethan about Julia during the operation, to which Ethan jokingly declines answering. Despite the team's effort, Farris dies from a small explosive device that was implanted in her head. Afterwards, Ethan comes across a microdot that was sent to him by Farris before her death. He immediately consults Luther about it but Luther finds that the microdot contains nothing, much to Ethan's dismay. Luther gently prods Ethan for reasons why Farris would send Ethan a blank microdot, let alone anything at all, eventually implying that Ethan slept with Lindsay. Nonetheless, Luther continues to be of assistance to Ethan, helping him abduct the man responsible for kidnapping Lindsay, an illegal arms dealer named Owen Davian. On top of providing his usual computer navigation, Luther also assists Ethan by providing him with a pull-away mask and specially-encoded voice patch so that Ethan can imitate Davian. On their way to bring Davian to authorities, Luther finds out that the microdot Farris sent was not blank but that the data was merely hidden and encrypted. The "data" is in the form of a video file shot by Lindsay in which she tells Ethan that she has found out that Brassell is a mole and has been leaking IMF data to Davian. Things take a turn for the worse when the convoy is attacked, Davian gets rescued, Ethan's fiancée is nabbed by Davian's men and Ethan and Luther are briefly separated when the CIA, believing that Ethan is the one who was behind the attack, apprehend him. Luther is reunited with Ethan in Shanghai after Musgrave allows him to escape and, once again, becomes his eyes, helping him to steal the "Rabbit's Foot", and escape the building in one piece, musing, "Langley was a cakewalk compared to this." However, that is the extent of Luther's help as Ethan is instructed to bring the Rabbit's Foot to Davian alone. He does not meet with Ethan again until the mission is over and everything is settled. He, along with the other members of the mission, cheer for Ethan and Julia as they leave for their honeymoon.

It is revealed in the later film Fallout that after Ethan and Julia fake her death, Luther is responsible for teaching Julia how to be a 'ghost': to disappear and avoid being hunted by anyone looking to use her against Ethan.

==== Mission: Impossible – Ghost Protocol ====
Luther is never involved in Ethan's mission of stopping a Swedish extremist from starting a nuclear war between the U.S. and Russia. He meets Hunt for a beer in a bar in Seattle (at the very end of the film) following the mission's success. Luther playfully mocks Ethan's over-dramatic method of aborting the missile that was to take out the city of San Francisco, saying that he cannot believe that, as he aborted the launch, Ethan actually yelled, aloud, the words, "MISSION ACCOMPLISHED!". Luther is then introduced to Ethan's team, IMF agents Jane Carter (portrayed by Paula Patton), William Brandt (portrayed by Jeremy Renner) and Benji Dunn (portrayed by Simon Pegg), the latter of the three, Luther has already met. Luther reveals that, thanks to them, he and his IMF mission clean-up crew "blew the entire weekend at the bottom of the San Francisco Bay" searching for the disabled nuclear warhead that Ethan aborted. He leaves after this, fist-bumping Ethan and says, "See you in Kandahar".

==== Mission: Impossible – Rogue Nation ====
In the fifth entry of the franchise, Luther helps take control of a plane taking off with an illegal package by hacking into a Russian satellite, much to Brandt's disapproval, as the IMF is under investigation for misconduct. Later, he is among the agents to remain loyal to Ethan when the IMF is shut down and Ethan is wanted by the CIA while working to take down a rogue international espionage ring called the Syndicate. Luther retires from IMF rather than be forced to betray Ethan but is called back to action by Brandt to help Ethan. There is nevertheless some tension between the two as the mission unfolds, with Brandt expressing concern about Ethan's plans due to the potential risk of their enemies gaining access to the funds they require to continue their operations, Brandt arguing that this cannot be the only option while Luther affirms his belief that sometimes Ethan is the one best qualified to see all the options. Despite Brandt's doubts, Ethan's plan succeeds in luring adversary Solomon Lane into a trap.

==== Mission: Impossible – Fallout ====
Rhames reprised his role in Mission: Impossible – Fallout. He is indirectly responsible for the threat of the main storyline, when Ethan allows his current adversaries to get away with three plutonium cores that could be used to create nuclear weapons to save Luther after he is taken hostage. Luther later joins Ethan and Benji in hunting the Apostles, a splinter group consisting of the still-free members of the Syndicate, as they attempt to break Lane out of prison with the aid of his associate John Lark, who is in reality August Walker of the CIA. During the mission, Walker and Lane attempt to make the attack personal by using the two remaining nuclear weapons to blow up a medical aid camp where Ethan's estranged wife, Julia, is now working, but she is able to assist Luther in disarming one of the warheads while Benji and Ilsa Faust disable the other and Ethan kills Walker for the prime detonator.

==== Mission: Impossible – Dead Reckoning Part One ====
Rhames reprises his role in Mission: Impossible – Dead Reckoning Part One, acting as the computer expert for Ethan's team. He provides Ethan assistance while navigating an airport in Abu Dhabi and helps Benji disarm a nuclear bomb in the baggage area, which turns out to be a hoax orchestrated by the Entity, an advanced AI. After Entity goes into their computers and tricks Ethan by mimicking Benji's voice, he and Benji destroy all electronic devices present. The next day, he goes on his own to study the Entity, and to give the team tech subterfuge as they complete their mission while fighting against Gabriel, Ethan's nemesis and apostle to the Entity. Before he leaves, he advises Ethan not to kill Gabriel out of vengeance for Ilsa's death, as they need him alive so they can question him later, a warning that Ethan ultimately heeded.

==== Mission: Impossible – The Final Reckoning ====
Rhames reprises his role as Luther in Mission: Impossible – The Final Reckoning, where he has been diagnosed with an unspecified illness but continues to help the team by building a "poison pill", a device that can permanently incapacitate the Entity. However, Gabriel steals the poison pill and traps him with a time bomb. After saying goodbye to Ethan, Luther sacrifices himself in order to minimize the blast. After Ethan defeats the Entity using the poison pill, he listens to a farewell message from Luther embedded inside it.

=== Video games ===
The video game version of Luther Stickell (modeled after Ving Rhames) in Mission: Impossible – Operation Surma

The character of Luther Stickell has also appeared in video games. In 2003 Atari released Mission: Impossible – Operation Surma for the Xbox, PlayStation 2, and GameCube. The game features Rhames as Stickell. GameSpot noted that the voices were great and added that having Rhames reprise his role made Luther "a little more authentic (and badass)." He also appears in the crossover game Lego Dimensions, voiced by John Eric Bentley.
