= Liang Yang =

Chinese actor, stuntman, martial artist (born 1980)

- Born: March 26, 1980 (age 46); Harbin, China
- Occupations: Actor; stuntman; martial artist
- Years active: 2007–present
- Known for: Star Wars: The Force Awakens; Mission: Impossible – Fallout
- Awards: SAG award for Outstanding Action Performance by a Stunt Ensemble in a Motion Picture (shared); SAG award for Outstanding Action Performance by a Stunt Ensemble in a Comedy or Drama Series (shared)

Liang Yang (Chinese: 杨亮; pinyin: Yáng Liàng; born March 26, 1980) is a Chinese actor, stuntman and martial artist. He is known for his work in the Hollywood film industry in movies such as Skyfall, Star Wars: The Force Awakens and Mission: Impossible – Fallout.

== Work ==
Yang first appeared as a stunt performer in 2007 with the action movie Underground. In 2011, he debuted in Hollywood with the movies Pirates of the Caribbean: On Stranger Tides and X-Men: First Class. In 2012, he played a brief role in the James Bond movie, Skyfall, opposite Daniel Craig. At 19th annual Screen Actors Guild Awards, Yang, along with the rest of the stunt team of Skyfall, received the SAG award for Outstanding Action Performance by a Stunt Ensemble in a Motion Picture. Yang was the stunt double for Emily Blunt in the 2014 movie Edge of Tomorrow.

For the 2015 movie, Star Wars: The Force Awakens, Yang played the role of a stormtrooper, engaged in a battle against Finn, portrayed by John Boyega. He was ultimately shot by Han Solo (Harrison Ford) in the movie. Yang also helped train Daisy Ridley for her role as Rey in the installment. Yang was also seen as Pedro Pascal's (who played Oberyn Martell) stunt double in the HBO series Game of Thrones, for which he, along with his team, won the SAG award for Outstanding Action Performance by a Stunt Ensemble in a Comedy or Drama Series.

Yang trained Felicity Jones for her character, Jyn Erso, and Donnie Yen who played Chirrut Imwe, in Rogue One: A Star Wars Story, the 2016 prequel to the Star Wars original trilogy.

In 2018, he made his most notable appearance in the action movie, Mission: Impossible – Fallout, in a bathroom fight scene against Tom Cruise and Henry Cavill where he briefly played the role of a decoy villain. His character was eventually shot by Rebecca Ferguson. The scene was reportedly shot over a month, with Henry Cavill calling the shoot "uncomfortably long" and stating afterwards that he was "shattered". Cavill went on to praise Yang as a "true champion of ability and especially character."

Liang Yang was chosen as fight coordinator for the 2022 Marvel movie, Doctor Strange in the Multiverse of Madness, and 2023 movie, The Marvels.

== Filmography ==
Year	Movie/ TV show	Notes
2007	Underground	First appearance
2008	Phoo Action	
2008	Bodyguard: A New Beginning	
2011	Pirates of the Caribbean: On Stranger Tides	Hollywood debut
2011	X-Men: First Class	
2011	Ra.One	Hindi debut, Tom Wu stunt double
2011	Johnny English Reborn	
2012	Snow White and the Huntsman	
2012	Skyfall	Cast as a bodyguard
2013	World War Z	
2013	Rush	
2013	47 Ronin	
2014	Edge of Tomorrow	Emily Blunt's stunt double
2014	Game of Thrones	Appeared in 1 episode; Pedro Pascal's (Oberyn Martell) stunt double
2014	Dracula Untold	
2014	Exodus: Gods and Kings	
2014	Kingsman: The Secret Service	
2015	Mission: Impossible – Rogue Nation	
2015	The Martian	Appears in second movie directed by Ridley Scott
2015	Pan	
2015	Star Wars: The Force Awakens	Plays the role of a stormtrooper, FN-2199, engaged in a battle against Finn, portrayed by John Boyega. Yells out "Traitor!", the voice of which is provided by David Acord.
2016	The Huntsman: Winter's War	
2016	Rogue One: A Star Wars Story	Fight coordinator
2017	Star Wars: The Last Jedi	
2018	Pacific Rim Uprising	
2018	Solo: A Star Wars Story	
2018	Mission: Impossible – Fallout	Briefly played the role of a decoy John Lark (villain), in a bathroom fight scene against Tom Cruise and Henry Cavill. His character was finally defeated by Rebecca Ferguson.
2019	Shanghai Fortress	
2020	Wonder Woman 1984	Fight coordinator
2021	Infinite	
2021	The King's Man	
2022	Morbius	
2022	Doctor Strange in the Multiverse of Madness	Fight coordinator
2022	Jurassic World Dominion	
2023	American Born Chinese	Fight coordinator; 1 episode
2023	Mission: Impossible – Dead Reckoning Part One	
2023	The Equalizer 3	
2023	The Marvels	Stunt coordinator
2024	Argylle	
2024	Deadpool & Wolverine	
2024	Kraven the Hunter	Additional photography
2025	The Gorge	
2025	The Forbidden City	
2025	Fuze	
2026	Masters of the Universe	
2027	Star Wars: Starfighter	
