= Ethan Hunt =

Fictional character from the Mission: Impossible films

- Mission: Impossible character
- Tom Cruise as Ethan Hunt in Mission: Impossible – Dead Reckoning Part One
- First appearance: Mission: Impossible (1996)
- Last appearance: Mission: Impossible – The Final Reckoning (2025)
- Portrayed by: Tom Cruise
- Voiced by: Kevin Bayliss; Steve Blum

In-universe information
- Spouse: Julia Meade (divorced)
- Relatives: Donald Hunt (paternal uncle); Margaret Hunt (mother)

Ethan Matthew Hunt is a fictional character and the main protagonist of the Mission: Impossible film series. He is portrayed by Tom Cruise. The character of Ethan Hunt is a highly skilled field agent and operative for the Impossible Missions Force (IMF), a secret government agency that handles dangerous and high-stakes missions.

== Appearances ==
=== Mission: Impossible (1996) ===
In the first film, Hunt acts as the IMF point man for an experienced field team led by veteran Jim Phelps (Jon Voight), his mentor. While attempting to prevent files containing information on all IMF's field agents from being stolen during a mission in Prague, the entire team, save for Hunt, appear to be killed, and the files are stolen. Hunt is seen as the main suspect as he learns that the mission was a set-up to expose a mole who had been selling secrets to an arms dealer called Max (Vanessa Redgrave); the real files are still secure at CIA headquarters in Langley. Hunt decides to steal the actual list himself for the arms dealer in exchange for a meeting with the actual mole and $10,000,000 in bearer bonds. He recruits a team of other disavowed agents such as hacker Luther Stickell (Ving Rhames), pilot Franz Krieger (Jean Reno), and Jim's wife Claire (Emmanuelle Béart), the only other survivor of the mission in Prague, to help him break into CIA headquarters in order to steal the genuine list in exchange for an introduction to the real mole, which he successfully does. Ethan later finds Jim alive and deduces that he is the real mole, working with Claire and Krieger to escape with the money and frame Ethan for their crimes. In a final confrontation aboard a TGV train in the Channel Tunnel, Claire is killed when she tries to protect Ethan, as Ethan clears his name by stopping and killing Phelps and Krieger before they are able to escape with the money and by securing the list. Ethan gets Luther reinstated as an IMF agent and considers leaving the IMF, but is offered a mission of his own during the flight home.

=== Mission: Impossible 2 (2000) ===
In the second film, Hunt is tasked with retrieving a deadly genetically engineered virus, known as "Chimera", from a rogue IMF agent, Sean Ambrose (Dougray Scott), who intends to release the virus after acquiring a controlling influence on the company that created it so that he can profit from sales of the cure. Hunt attempts to infiltrate Ambrose's inner circle through Ambrose's former girlfriend, Nyah Nordoff-Hall (Thandiwe Newton), an accomplished thief. During their mission, Hunt and Nordoff-Hall engage in an affair that complicates the mission. During a stand-off with Ambrose's forces, Nordoff-Hall is forced to infect herself with the last virus in order to save Hunt; with Hunt having destroyed the only other traces of the virus, she was thus able to shield Hunt until he could escape the confrontation. Subsequently, racing against time— the virus is incurable twenty hours after infection— Hunt manages to acquire the cure and is forced to kill Ambrose.

=== Mission: Impossible III (2006) ===
In the third film, Hunt is now a semi-retired training officer for IMF and plans a quiet life with his fiancée Julia Meade (Michelle Monaghan), who does not know about the IMF. He is called back into service to rescue a former student called Lindsey Farris (Keri Russell) who was captured during a mission in Germany, and recovers confidential information via a stolen laptop after Farris is killed. He is forced to once again go rogue in an attempt to track down arms dealer, Owen Davian (Philip Seymour Hoffman) and secure a dangerous mystery item known as the 'Rabbit's Foot'. After an impromptu ceremony, Hunt and Julia are married, only for Owen, who has a double agent working within IMF, to kidnap Julia. With the help of his IMF team: Stickell, Declan Gormley (Jonathan Rhys Meyers), and Zhen Lei (Maggie Q), Hunt finds the Rabbit's foot, saves Julia, and kills Owen Davian in Shanghai.

The sixth film of the series, Mission: Impossible – Fallout, has Stickell confirm that Ethan and Julia were happy for a while, but their marriage was tainted every time they heard about a disaster due to Ethan's potential to have prevented them from happening.

=== Mission: Impossible – Ghost Protocol (2011) ===
In the fourth film, Hunt—having just escaped from a deep-cover mission in prison—and his IMF team, Benji Dunn (Simon Pegg) and Jane Carter (Paula Patton), are blamed for an attack that destroys the Kremlin, resulting in the disavowal of the entire IMF. He is informed of this by the IMF secretary (Tom Wilkinson), who is then promptly assassinated in an incident that only Ethan and William Brandt (Jeremy Renner) survive. Despite lacking their usual resources, connections, technology, and backup, they set out to find and stop Kurt Hendricks (Michael Nyqvist), AKA Cobalt, a former Soviet nuclear strategist who is intent on starting a nuclear war to usher in the next era of human evolution. As they chase Hendricks to Dubai and on to Mumbai, India, they themselves are pursued by a team of Russian agents trying to apprehend them. The team becomes increasingly fractured as individual members fight their own demons while trying to trust the others, notably Brandt, who had been assigned to protect Ethan and Julia years earlier, only for Julia to supposedly die at the hands of six Serbian terrorists, whom Hunt promptly killed, leading to his arrest at the start of the film. Hunt manages to pull the team together, stop a nuclear bomb and clear the IMF of any involvement in the Kremlin attack. Hunt later reveals to Brandt that he had Julia's death faked to protect her, something only he and the IMF Secretary knew about, giving him the pretext to infiltrate the prison his team freed him from in the opening scene.

=== Mission: Impossible – Rogue Nation (2015) ===
In the fifth film, Hunt is assigned a mission that culminates in him hanging outside of an A400M military aircraft 5,000 feet above the ground in Belarus to recover a package that contains VX nerve gas. Although this mission succeeds, when he learns that the thieves responsible for stealing the gas lacked the connections to do so, Hunt begins to uncover evidence of the existence of the Syndicate, a consortium of covert operatives from various intelligence agencies who wreak terrorist attacks worldwide. After Hunt is nearly killed by the Syndicate, barely escaping the Syndicate with the help of MI-6 agent Ilsa Faust (Rebecca Ferguson), the IMF is disbanded and absorbed into the CIA due to its controversial and destructive methods. As a result, he spends six months trying to track the Syndicate, eventually heading to an opera house where the Chancellor of Austria is killed by a car bomb. Hunt and Benji become tracked by the CIA in their attempts to take down the Syndicate, and eventually, he and his entire team (Benji Dunn, William Brandt, and Luther Stickell) along with Faust, learn from the prime minister of the United Kingdom (Tom Hollander) that the Syndicate was actually originally a British project of MI-6 director Atlee (Simon McBurney) to perform missions without oversight, but disillusioned British agent Solomon Lane (Sean Harris) took the plans and went rogue, now seeking to steal files that would grant him access to various established bank accounts to finance future Syndicate operations. Refusing to allow the Syndicate to continue, Hunt and his team are able to capture Lane, with CIA Director Alan Hunley (Alec Baldwin) subsequently forced to claim that the disbanding of IMF was a cover to allow them to track the Syndicate. Hunley subsequently also becomes the new IMF Secretary.

=== Mission: Impossible – Fallout (2018) ===
In the sixth film, Ethan suffers a nightmare of being wed to Julia in an island, only for Lane to be revealed to be the priest and all 3 to perish in a nuclear explosion. Later, Ethan is tasked by the IMF with retrieving three plutonium cores in the possession of Eastern European extremists who aim to trade them to the remnants of the Syndicate, known now as the Apostles, who aim to give them to nuclear extremist "John Lark". However, during the mission, Stickell is taken hostage, and Hunt saves him, thus failing to retrieve the cores. As a result of their failure, Hunley's replacement, Erika Sloane (Angela Bassett) forces Ethan to work with the CIA's top agent, August Walker (Henry Cavill). Ethan assumes the identity of Lark and helps Max's daughter Alanna to gain one of the cores in exchange for breaking Lane out of prison – despite opposition from Ilsa Faust, now under orders to kill Lane or bring him back to Britain. After capturing Lane, Ethan and his crew discover Walker framed Ethan, and have Benji disguise himself as Lane to reveal Walker as the real John Lark, who has grown disillusioned with society and aims to use the plutonium to create a new world order. When Hunley is killed by Walker, Ethan's team and Ilsa track down Walker and Lane to a medical aid camp in Kashmir where Julia, Ethan's former wife, is currently working, Ethan realizing that Lane and Walker intend to detonate the bombs there for both personal reason of hurting Ethan and the wider-scale reason that such a nuclear detonation would contaminate the water supply for almost a third of the world's population. While Luther, Julia, Benji and Ilsa disable the bombs and confront Lane, Ethan is forced to steal a helicopter to pursue Walker and acquire the bomb detonator, culminating in a desperate and brutal struggle on a steep cliff that ends with Walker tumbles off the cliff along with the helicopter and dies. With the crisis concluded, Ethan's reputation and the IMF is redeemed in the eyes of the CIA, who muse that Ethan's focus on individual lives is important for his superiors as it allows them to focus on the bigger picture.

=== Mission: Impossible – Dead Reckoning (2023) ===
In the seventh film, Hunt tries to track down two halves of a key that could help take down a rogue artificial intelligence known as The Entity, initially created by the United States. In the process he confronts Gabriel, a terrorist in allegiance with the Entity, who was also responsible for the murder of Hunt's girlfriend, Marie, which led Hunt to become an IMF agent. While tracking the keys, Ethan's ally Ilsa Faust is killed, but Ethan, Luther and Benji make a new ally in the form of Grace, a skilled thief who was hired by Gabriel to acquire the keys but turned against Gabriel when he attempted to kill her. Having established that the keys would allow access to the Entity's source code, Luther goes off-grid to devise a way to properly oppose and shut down the Entity while Ethan and Benji retrieve the keys from Grace, who officially joins the IMF as a new agent.

=== Mission: Impossible – The Final Reckoning (2025) ===
In the eighth film of the series, two months after the events of Dead Reckoning, Ethan continues his mission to stop Gabriel from obtaining the AI program known as "the Entity" with the help of Grace. Gabriel captures the two and coerces Ethan into retrieving the core module, revealed to be the "Rabbit's Foot", from the sunken Russian submarine Sevastopol for him, which would give him control over the Entity's source code. With help of Benji, and new recruits Paris and Degas, the two escape and find the device Gabriel used to communicate with the Entity, which shows Ethan a vision of a coming nuclear apocalypse. Realizing the Entity needs access to a secure digital bunker, the Doomsday Vault, in South Africa to ensure its survival, Ethan sends his team to retrieve Sevastopol's coordinates and rejoins Luther, who reveals Gabriel has stolen the "Poison Pill", a malware he created for the Entity, and planted a nuclear bomb in London, which Luther sacrifices himself to disarm. Ethan is apprehended, but he convinces President Erika Sloane to let him continue the mission. With help from Benji, Grace, Paris, and William Donloe, Ethan acquires the module from the wreck. After being revived from decompression sickness, he arrives at the bunker in South Africa with his group and finds Gabriel with his allies, demanding the module. As Kittridge and Briggs intervene, Ethan chases Gabriel as he escapes in a biplane. Gabriel is killed during an escape attempt, and Ethan, having collected the Poison Pill, descends using a second parachute, and unites the Poison Pill with the module, successfully trapping the Entity in a drive. Briggs, who is revealed to be Jim Phelps Jr., the son of Ethan's original team leader Jim Phelps, makes peace with him. The IMF team reunites in London, where Grace gives the drive to Ethan, and the team members go their separate ways.

== Video games ==
Aside from the Mission: Impossible films, Ethan Hunt has appeared in the 1998 video game based on the first film, voiced by Kevin Bayliss, and the 2003 video game Mission: Impossible – Operation Surma, in which he's voiced by Steve Blum; this version does not bear any resemblance to the film iteration of the character in either likeness or voice. He also appears as a playable character in the crossover game Lego Dimensions, with archive recordings of Tom Cruise being used for his voice.

== Reception ==
Vlad Dima, writing in Bright Lights Film Journal, said while the series succeeds due to "inventive, over-the-top stunts, the relentless trickery, and ultimately... Tom Cruise's star-power", he said, "One less obvious element, though, is a myth that slowly develops over the span of the series and comes to full bloom in Fallout... [is Ethan] Hunt's eternal quest... to become the perfect man." Dima said Ethan Hunt "comes from a long line of action heroes" and that the character (and the films) have become more like James Bond and Jason Bourne. Hunt "erases all of the weaknesses we have ever noticed in any of these screen heroes". He is unlike Bourne in knowing his status as "a good guy" and unlike Bond in not womanizing, having cared about only two women. Dima said, "This personal detail seems to be an important requirement in the mythology of the perfect man."
