= Bruce Geller =

American television producer and writer (1930–1978)

- Born: Bruce Bernard Geller; October 13, 1930; New York City, U.S.
- Died: May 21, 1978 (aged 47); Santa Barbara, California, U.S.
- Education: Yale University
- Known for: Producing Mission: Impossible and Mannix
- Spouse: Jeannette Marx (m. 1953)
- Children: 2

Bruce Bernard Geller (October 13, 1930 – May 21, 1978) was an American lyricist, screenwriter, director, and television producer. He was best known for the action series Mission: Impossible (1966–1973), and detective drama Mannix (1967–1975).

== Early life and education ==
Geller was born in a Jewish family in New York City, the son of Dorothy (née Friedlander) and General Sessions Judge Abraham N. Geller. Geller graduated from Yale University in 1952, where he had studied psychology and sociology and was involved in many activities including theater.

== Career ==
He pursued a career writing scripts for shows on the DuMont Television Network including Jimmy Hughes, Rookie Cop (1953) and others. He also wrote the book and lyrics for musical theatre productions including Livin' the Life (1957) and All in Love (1961), but his efforts met with only modest success. Geller left New York for Los Angeles, where he was employed writing scripts for episodes of several television series, including Zane Grey Theater, Have Gun – Will Travel, The Rebel, and The Rifleman. He also worked as the co-executive producer of the Rawhide series for the 1964-1965 television season.

While producing Rawhide, he developed the idea for a new "cloak-and-dagger" series, Mission: Impossible. In 1966, Geller created and produced Mission: Impossible (for which he wrote the pilot episode), the accomplishment for which he is best remembered. The show ran on CBS from 1966 to 1973 and earned him an Emmy Award in 1966 as producer plus another for Outstanding Writing Achievement in Drama. During the early seasons, a photograph of Geller was included in the dossier of Impossible Missions Force (IMF) agents that IMF leaders Briggs and Phelps perused each week and was often visible on screen (such as in the episodes "Memory", "Operation Rogosh" and "Operation - Heart"). The series was revived in 1988 and aired until 1990 on ABC.

Geller also wrote, produced, and directed for the series Mannix (1967–1975), which was twice nominated for an Emmy Award. In 1973, he made his only venture into feature films, producing and directing Harry in Your Pocket starring James Coburn and Walter Pidgeon.

== Death ==
A flying enthusiast, Bruce Geller died on May 21, 1978, when the Cessna Skymaster he was piloting ran into fog and crashed into Buena Vista Canyon near Santa Barbara, California. He is interred in the Jewish Mount Sinai Memorial Park Cemetery in Los Angeles.

== Accolades ==
Awards and nominations
Year	Association	Category	Work	Result
1961	Writers Guild of America Awards	Anthology Drama, 30 Minutes in Length	The DuPont Show with June Allyson: "The Trench Coat"	Nominated
1962	Writers Guild of America Awards	Episodic Drama	The Westerner: "Brown"	Nominated
1964	Writers Guild of America Awards	Anthology, Any Length	The Dick Powell Show: "The Judge"	Nominated
1965	Bronze Wrangler	Fictional Television Drama	Rawhide: "Corporal Dasovic"	Won
1967	Primetime Emmy Awards	Outstanding Dramatic Series	Mission: Impossible: "Pilot"	Won
1967	Primetime Emmy Awards	Outstanding Writing Achievement in Drama	Mission: Impossible: "Pilot"	Won
1969	Primetime Emmy Awards	Outstanding Dramatic Series	Mission: Impossible: "Pilot"	Nominated
1969	Writers Guild of America Awards	Episodic Drama	Mannix: "The Name is Mannix"	Nominated
1972	Primetime Emmy Awards	Outstanding Drama Series	Mannix	Nominated
1973	Primetime Emmy Awards	Outstanding Drama Series	Mannix	Nominated
