= Hollweg =

Hollweg is a surname of German origin. Notable people with the surname include:

- Alexander Hollweg (1936–2020), British painter and sculptor
- Ilse Hollweg (1922–1990), German operatic coloratura soprano
- Nikolaus Hollweg (1897–1923), Bavarian police officer, casualty of the Beer Hall Putsch
- Rebecca Hollweg (born 1964), English singer-songwriter
- Ryan Hollweg (born 1983), American professional ice hockey forward
- Uwe Hollweg (1937–2024), German entrepreneur and politician

== See also ==
- August von Bethmann-Hollweg (1795–1877), German jurist and Prussian politician
- Joachim von Bethmann-Hollweg (1911–2001), German ice hockey player
- Theobald von Bethmann-Hollweg (1856–1921), German politician and statesman
