= Rebecca Hollweg =

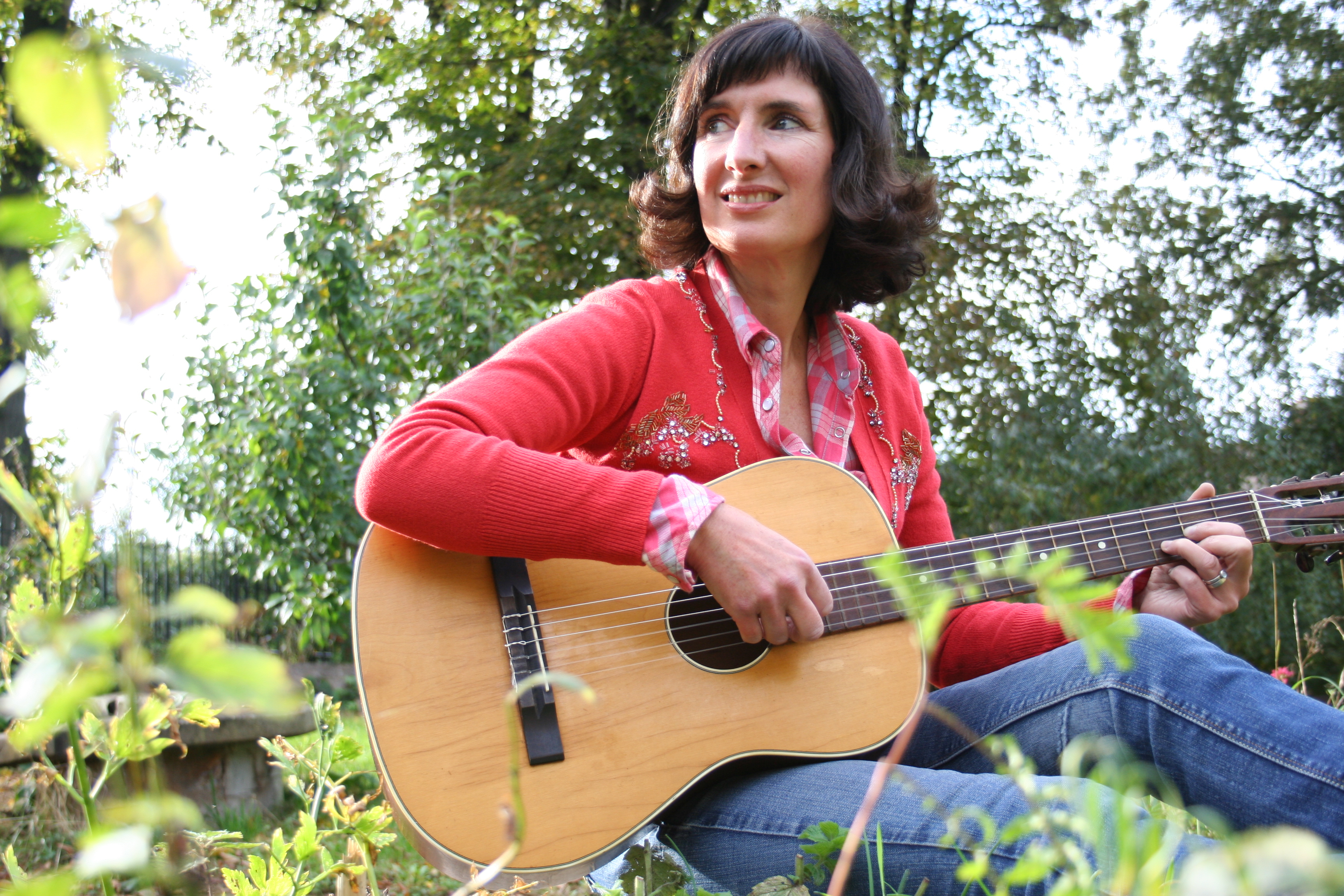
- Rebecca Hollweg in 2014, from the cover of her album Country Girl. Photo by Emily Bowling

Background information
- Born: Rebecca von Bethmann-Hollweg; 30 June 1964 (age 62); London, England
- Genres: Singer-songwriter; mainstream jazz and melodic pop music
- Instrument: vocals; guitar
- Label: Emu Records
- Website: www.rebeccahollweg.com

Rebecca Hollweg (born 30 June 1964) is an English singer-songwriter. She has been described as "a talented songsmith" who "combines old-school craftsmanship with Joni Mitchell's perspectives on relationships and environment" and "a silky-voiced jazz-influenced songwriter" who "laces her low-key arrangements with exquisite vocals".

== Early life and education ==
Rebecca Hollweg was born in west London, and from the age of nine grew up in rural west Somerset. She is the daughter of visual artists, who have both internationally exhibited. Her father, Alexander Hollweg (grandson of the painter Edward Wadsworth and son of the Olympic ice hockey player Joachim von Bethmann-Hollweg), was a painter and sculptor whose work is in the Tate Gallery collection and in private and corporate collections in North America and in Italy. His murals are in the Charlotte Street Hotel and the Soho Hotel in central London. Her mother Geraldine Hollweg (née James) is a silversmith and enameller, who trained as a painter at the Ruskin School of Drawing and Fine Art, Oxford and worked as a scene painter at the Royal Shakespeare Company. Her brother is chef and food writer Lucas Hollweg.

Rebecca Hollweg went to West Somerset College in Minehead and then to St Edmund Hall, Oxford. She has a Bachelor of Arts in French and German from Oxford University and a Diploma in Jazz and Studio Music from London's Guildhall School of Music and Drama.

== Professional career ==
=== Performance and songwriting ===
Rebecca Hollweg did her own headline tour of the United Kingdom in 2002, and supported The Byrds' Roger McGuinn on his 2002 UK tour. She also toured the UK in 2003, supporting Paul Carrack of Squeeze and Mike & The Mechanics.

She has played London venues including Ronnie Scott's, 606 Club, PizzaExpress Jazz Club, The Pheasantry and the Southbank Centre, as well as arts centres, theatres and music venues elsewhere in the UK. She is a regular musical guest of poet John Hegley at his monthly nights at the Betsey Trotwood pub in Clerkenwell, London and was also his guest twice during his poet-in-residency at Keats House, Hampstead.

In 2002 she wrote lyrics for "Falling", which had been composed by Harvie S and had been recorded by him as an instrumental piece played by saxophonist David Sanborn. Singer Carleen Anderson recorded the song, with Rebecca Hollweg's lyrics, on Andy Hamill's 2002 album Bee for Bass. Rebecca Hollweg then recorded it on her 2008 album Orange Roses.

Three of her songs are on the soundtrack of a short film The Bitterest Pill, which stars BBC Radio 1 DJ Sara Cox. Other songs of hers have been covered live by Claire Martin.

Rebecca Hollweg has performed and recorded with the same band for more than 20 years, which consists of leading British jazz session musicians Andy Hamill (bass), Mike Outram (guitar), Tom Gordon (drums), Phil Peskett (piano), and Julian Ferraretto (violin). She also works in different contexts with a wide selection of the country's top jazz session players.

=== The Demos ===
In 1999 Rebecca Hollweg published, privately in a limited edition, a demo album, The Demos, which featured earlier versions of songs from June Babies and Orange Roses. Since 2009 it has also been available via the CD Baby website.

=== June Babies ===
In October 2001 she released her first album, June Babies. Consisting of melodic pop songs, it featured string arrangements by Chris Bowden and a guest appearance by Jeb Loy Nichols. It was critically acclaimed in the British national and music press. Dan Cairns, writing in the Culture section of The Sunday Times, praised "the title track’s ode to friendship and late developers, the bare-bones upcloseness of Where Are You Going? and the wryly observational Is It Me You’re Looking For?" and said: "there is something of [Joni] Mitchell in her soaring vocal lines and [Suzanne] Vega in her confessional ones, though there are unexpected echoes, too, of Marianne Faithfull at her throatiest". Rob Beattie in Q magazine described her as a "gifted tunesmith, happy to wrangle words into memorable phrases ('You cannot see these bruises/They are inside my head')" and praised "Weather Song, with its infectious chorus, and the beautiful, bouncing Warhol and Williams".

Songs from the album were played on Jeremy Vine's BBC Radio 2 show. The title track was used in a BBC television programme about women runners.

The album was produced by Andy Hamill, bass player with 4hero, Carleen Anderson and Shea Seger, who has played bass on albums by Laura Mvula, Rumer, Carleen Anderson, Natacha Atlas, 4Hero, Nitin Sawhney, and has also worked with Kylie, Martha Reeves, Tim Minchin, John Hegley, and Omar.

=== Orange Roses ===
In March 2008 she completed and released Orange Roses, whose songs have a country tinge. Produced by Andy Hamill and mixed by Brad Nunn of 4hero, the album features the same musicians as on June Babies and a sleeve design by Jeb Loy Nichols. Reviewing the album for NetRhythms, Mike Davies described it as "an equally warm, mellow affair that colours the folk core with jazz, pop and country on more songs about childhood, the awakenings passing years bring, beginning and endings, and relationships". Mick Houghton, in a four-starred review in the March issue of Uncut, described her as "akin to an old school Brill Building songsmith. Carole King couldn’t have come up with a better pop song than 'These Are My Tears'. If only the Carpenters were around to cover it – someone should."

Andy Cole, writing in Maverick music magazine, said: "Rebecca writes deceptively about the everyday things of life... Orange Roses... is personally my contender for song of the year. It’s about wiping away the sadness and embracing new beginnings... These Are My Tears with its smooth electric guitar is something you could imagine the late Karen Carpenter wrapping her voice around this near perfect pop song...highly listenable from beginning to end which has you reaching for the replay button for more chill-out joy. Music of the highest quality."

=== Country Girl ===
Her album Country Girl was released in February 2015. Produced and recorded by Andy Hamill at Emu's Nest Studios in London, it was mixed by Andy Hamill and Chris Lewis and was mastered by Chris Lewis. It was launched at the Cavendish Arms in Stockwell, London on 23 November 2014.

The title track was played on BBC Radio 2 by Janice Long and by Robert Elms on his BBC London 94.9 radio show. Jamie Cullum played the song "Light" on his BBC Radio 2 programme on 3 March 2015, saying "a great singer who I love very much... a real great listen from start to finish... this great, great album".

Reviewing Country Girl for Uncut magazine, Mick Houghton gave it 8 of 10, describing it as "another delightful batch of tunes" and adding: "The title track sets the tone, a jaunty, bass-driven, tongue-in-cheek look at city life, 'Ruby' is sung to her daughter and would have fitted snugly on any Carpenters’ album."

=== Other People's Songs ===
Hollweg released a digital album, Other People's Songs, in November 2020.

== Broadcasting ==
In February 2015 Rebecca Hollweg was on Robert Elms' BBC London 94.9 radio show. Also in February 2015, she was interviewed and played live on World Update with Dan Damon on BBC World Service radio, and the title track of her new album Country Girl was played on BBC Radio 2 by Janice Long. She has been interviewed and played live on Woman's Hour on BBC Radio 4 and the Nicky Campbell show on BBC Radio 5 Live and has appeared twice on Janice Long's show. She has performed sessions for BBC 6Music, Simon Lederman's show on BBC London, Gyles Brandreth and Wendy Lloyd's programmes on LBC, BBC Radio Scotland, BBC Radio 4's Loose Ends and on Artsworld for Illumina TV.

== Discography ==
Album	Release date	Label
The Demos	Limited edition, published privately, 1999	Emu Records
June Babies	9 October 2001	Emu Records (EMU 02)
Orange Roses	10 March 2008	Emu Records (EMU 04)
Country Girl	9 February 2015	Emu Records (EMU 05)
Other People's Songs	November 2020	Emu Records (EMU 07)

== Other recordings ==
Rebecca Hollweg provided background vocals on Now Then, the 2005 album by Jeb Loy Nichols and on Hopetown House, the 2009 album by Clara Sanabras & the Real Lowdown. She has also recorded duets with Tony Penultimate, aka Peter Brooke Turner of the Ukulele Orchestra of Great Britain, on his 2014 album Adventures in Gibberish. She sang a duet with Jeb Loy Nichols on his song "Dear Love" on Andy Hamill's album Bee for Bass (2003).

== Publications ==
- (with Jeb Loy Nichols): The Ball That Got Stuck in the Tree, Emu Records, 2010. ISBN 978-0956592606

== Personal life ==
- Rebecca Hollweg lives in London. She and her husband, bass player Andy Hamill, married in 2003. They have a daughter, born in 2004.

== References and footnotes ==
As of this edit, this article uses content from "Rebecca Hollweg's official website", which is licensed in a way that permits reuse under the Creative Commons Attribution-ShareAlike 3.0 Unported License, but not under the GFDL. All relevant terms must be followed.
