= Von Bethmann-Hollweg =

Origin
- Language: German

Von Bethmann-Hollweg is a German-language surname. The name may refer to:

- Moritz August von Bethmann-Hollweg (1795–1877), German jurist and Prussian politician
- Theobald von Bethmann Hollweg (1856–1921), German politician who was the Chancellor of the German Empire from 1909 to 1917
- Joachim Albrecht von Bethmann-Hollweg (1911–2001), German ice hockey player who competed for the German national team at the 1936 Winter Olympics in Garmisch-Partenkirchen, Bavaria, southern Germany
- Alexander von Bethmann-Hollweg (known as Alexander Hollweg; 1936–2020), English painter
