= Now Then (Jeb Loy Nichols album) =

Studio album by Jeb Loy Nichols
- Released: 2005
- Genre: Pop rock
- Length: 38:56 (UK)/41:55 (US)
- Label: Tuition Records (UK); Bongo Beat (US)
- Producer: Mark Nevers

Jeb Loy Nichols chronology
Easy Now (2002)	Now Then (2005)	Days Are Mighty (2007)

Alternative cover
- U.S. release cover

Now Then is the fourth album by American-born singer/songwriter Jeb Loy Nichols, released in 2005 on the Tuition record label in the UK and Bongo Beat in the US.

== Track listing ==
1. "Sometimes Shooting Stars" – 2:56
2. "Really Together" – 3:23
3. "Lelah Mae" – 2:46
4. "Painted My Dream House Blue'" – 3:26
5. "Bad Fruit" – 2:31
6. "Let's Make It Up" – 2:49
7. "Morning Love" – 3:13
8. "Black Water Road" – 3:25
9. "Don't Dance With Me" – 3:26
10. "Ever Feel Like Leaving" – 3:20
11. "When Did You Stop Loving Me" – 3:54
12. "Sweet Tough and Terrible" – 3:47
13. "Love Me Too" – 2:59 (US release only)

== Reception ==
Professional ratings
Review scores
Source	Rating
Allmusic	4.5/5 stars

Now Then was recorded in Nashville and London and received very positive reviews. Allmusic.com said "Jeb Loy Nichols' fourth offering reveals the totality of the promise that his earlier records suggested and developed. All the beautiful threads he wove in Lovers Knot through Just What Time It Is and Easy Now have become a golden braid with Now Then." The editorial review at Amazon.com says it is "a remarkable record, a masterpiece of distilled soul." Ralph Alonso, owner of Bongo Beat Records which licensed the album for release in the US said "I am going to personally state on the record that this is one of the finest albums on my roster, something so fully formed and beautiful, it will continue to resonate and unravel its wonder long after you and I are long gone and forgotten. Like the best of Al Green or Marvin Gaye, this CD is perfect from beginning to end; a smooth and subtle sexual menage a trois of reggae, country and soul."
