= Lover's knot =

Lover's knot may refer to:

- True lover's knot, a type of knot
- True lover's knot (moth), a species of moth
- Lovers' Knots, 1992 novel by Marion Halligan
- Lover's Knot (film), 1995 romantic comedy film starring Jennifer Grey and Billy Campbell
- Lovers Knot (album), 1997 album by Jeb Loy Nichols
