= June Babies =

Studio album by Rebecca Hollweg
- Released: 9 October 2001
- Genre: singer-songwriter
- Length: 41:46
- Label: Emu Records
- Producer: Andy Hamill

Rebecca Hollweg chronology
The Demos (1999)	June Babies (2001)	Orange Roses (2008)

June Babies, the first album by English singer-songwriter Rebecca Hollweg, was released on 9 October 2001 on Emu Records. Consisting of melodic pop songs, it featured string arrangements by Chris Bowden and a guest appearance by Jeb Loy Nichols. It was critically acclaimed in the British national and music press and was played on Jeremy Vine's BBC Radio 2 show. The title track was used in a BBC television programme about women runners.

== Production and launch ==
The album was produced and recorded by Andy Hamill in London.

== Reception ==
Dan Cairns, writing in the Culture section of The Sunday Times, praised "the title track’s ode to friendship and late developers, the bare-bones upcloseness of Where Are You Going? and the wryly observational Is It Me You’re Looking For?" and said: "there is something of [Joni] Mitchell in her soaring vocal lines and [Suzanne] Vega in her confessional ones, though there are unexpected echoes, too, of Marianne Faithfull at her throatiest".

Rob Beattie in Q magazine described her as a "gifted tunesmith, happy to wrangle words into memorable phrases ('You cannot see these bruises/They are inside my head')" and praised "Weather Song, with its infectious chorus, and the beautiful, bouncing Warhol and Williams".

Songs from the album were played on Jeremy Vine's BBC Radio 2 show. The title track was used in a BBC television programme about women runners.

== Track listing ==
1. "June Babies" (3:14)
2. "Getting On" (3:35)
3. "Sorry" (2:44)
4. "Warhol & Williams/Playout" (4:27)
5. "Is It Me You're Looking For?" (3:48)
6. "Long Lie" (3:14)
7. "Dancing in the Kitchen" (3:04)
8. "Weather Song" (2:19)
9. "Have You Heard the Birds Sing in the Night?" (3:30)
10. "Take Me Away" (3:38)
11. "Where Are You Going?" (3:31)
12. "Existential" (3:39)

Running time: 41:46

== Personnel ==
- Rebecca Hollweg – vocals, acoustic guitar
- Andy Hamill – double bass, bass guitars, backing vocals
- Jeb Loy Nichols – backing vocals on "Warhol & Williams/Playout"
- Phil Peskett – piano, electric piano
- Mike Outram – guitar, backing vocals
- Mark Johns – guitar
- Tom Gordon – drums, percussion
- Chris Bowden – saxophone
- Chris Worsley – cello
- Alex Hollweg – sousaphone on "Warhol & Williams/Playout"
- Reiad Chibah – viola
- Everton Nelson – violin
- Jacqueline Norrie – violin
