= Mission: Impossible – Fallout =

2018 film by Christopher McQuarrie

- Theatrical release poster
- Directed by: Christopher McQuarrie
- Written by: Christopher McQuarrie
- Based on: Mission: Impossible by Bruce Geller
- Produced by: Tom Cruise; J. J. Abrams; Christopher McQuarrie; Jake Myers
- Starring: Tom Cruise; Henry Cavill; Ving Rhames; Simon Pegg; Rebecca Ferguson; Sean Harris; Angela Bassett; Vanessa Kirby; Michelle Monaghan; Alec Baldwin
- Cinematography: Rob Hardy
- Edited by: Eddie Hamilton
- Music by: Lorne Balfe (Note: Mission: Impossible Theme composed by Lalo Schifrin)
- Production companies: Paramount Pictures; Skydance; TC Productions; Bad Robot
- Distributed by: Paramount Pictures
- Release dates: July 12, 2018 (Paris); July 27, 2018 (United States)
- Running time: 147 minutes
- Country: United States
- Language: English
- Budget: $178–250 million
- Box office: $791.1 million

Mission: Impossible – Fallout is a 2018 American action spy film written and directed by Christopher McQuarrie. It is the sequel to Mission: Impossible – Rogue Nation (2015) and the sixth installment in the Mission: Impossible film series. The ensemble cast includes Tom Cruise, Henry Cavill, Ving Rhames, Simon Pegg, Rebecca Ferguson, Sean Harris, Angela Bassett, Vanessa Kirby, Michelle Monaghan, and Alec Baldwin. Set two years after the events of Rogue Nation, Fallout follows Impossible Missions Force agent Ethan Hunt (Cruise) and his team in their efforts to prevent a nuclear attack by terrorist Solomon Lane (Harris) and the mysterious extremist John Lark.

Work on a sequel to Rogue Nation commenced before its 2015 release. The series' first returning director, McQuarrie intended for Fallout to better explore Ethan's character and emotions, believing previous entries had left him primarily a cipher for audiences, and to test the limits of Ethan's abilities, morality, and personal relationships. The script was brief, only 33 pages, serving as an outline driven primarily by the interesting filming locations and allowing for improvisation and significant changes to scenes throughout filming. Principal photography began in April 2017, on a $178–180 million budget, in Paris, continuing on to London, New Zealand, Norway, and the United Arab Emirates by early 2018. Filming was delayed for several months after Cruise broke his ankle during a stunt, significantly inflating the budget while the production waited for his return but also providing McQuarrie the opportunity to further develop unfinished scenes in the script.

Mission: Impossible – Fallout premiered in Paris on July 12, 2018, and was theatrically released in the United States on July 27. The film garnered universal acclaim, particularly for its standout setpieces, and received several awards. It also broke box office records for the series and grossed $791.1 million worldwide, making it the highest-grossing film in the Mission: Impossible series and the eighth-highest-grossing film of 2018. Fallout was followed by two sequels: Mission: Impossible – Dead Reckoning Part One (Note: Later retitled Mission: Impossible – Dead Reckoning.) (2023) and Mission: Impossible – The Final Reckoning (2025).

== Plot ==
Two years after the capture of rogue British agent Solomon Lane, (Note: As depicted in Mission: Impossible – Rogue Nation (2015)) his terrorist network, the Syndicate, has reorganized as the Apostles, a terror-for-hire group. They are recruited by extremist "John Lark" to acquire three plutonium cores for nuclear bombs he will use to dismantle the existing world order.

Impossible Missions Force (IMF) agent Ethan Hunt fails to recover the cores in Berlin after the Apostles take his teammate Luther Stickell hostage; Ethan chooses to save Luther, allowing the Apostles to steal the cores. Ethan, Luther, and teammate Benji Dunn capture Lark's nuclear weapons specialist, Nils Delbruuk, and trick him into providing schematics for Lark's bombs. Central Intelligence Agency (CIA) director Erika Sloane confronts Ethan and IMF secretary Alan Hunley over the team's failure to recover the plutonium. She insists on sending her agent, August Walker, with them to find the cores, directing him to consider anyone expendable.

Ethan and Walker perform a HALO jump above Paris and infiltrate a nightclub where Lark is to purchase the cores from arms broker Alanna Mitsopolis. They approach a man whom they believe to be Lark but after an intense fight in the men's restroom, Ethan's ally MI6 agent, Ilsa Faust, intervenes and kills the man to save Ethan. Assuming Lark's identity, Ethan meets Mitsopolis, who gives him one core, explaining that the Apostles will deliver the others after he attacks a police convoy and liberates its prisoner, Lane. Meanwhile, Walker gives Sloane evidence suggesting Ethan is the real Lark.

Ethan deviates from the plan and rams the truck carrying Lane into the Seine to protect its police escort from Mitsopolis's mercenaries. He leads the police away while Benji and Luther secure Lane and thwarts an assassination attempt on Lane by Ilsa. Meeting with Ethan, Ilsa explains that MI6 assigned her to kill Lane to prevent foreign governments from interrogating him and prove her loyalty after working undercover as a Syndicate agent. She was ordered to protect Lark and ensure Lane's escape, but disobeyed to protect Ethan.

The team brings Lane to London for the exchange, but Hunley confronts them with Walker's evidence. The team tricks Walker into admitting he is Lark, and Sloane sends a CIA unit to arrest them all. However, the Apostles intervene, and in the ensuing gunfight, Walker kills Hunley and escapes alongside Lane. Ethan gives chase until Walker reveals he has located Julia—Ethan's ex-wife, who was sent into hiding to protect her from his enemies (Note: Julia was introduced in Mission: Impossible III (2006), and her death had been faked before the events of the following film, Mission: Impossible – Ghost Protocol (2011))—and threatens her life. Walker is unable to kill Ethan, as Lane is withholding the remaining cores until he can take revenge on Ethan.

Ethan, Benji, Luther, and Ilsa track Lane and Walker to a medical camp near the Siachen Glacier in Kashmir, treating a smallpox outbreak orchestrated by the Apostles. Ilsa deduces that Lane will use the bombs to irradiate the water supplies of bordering India, Pakistan, and China, threatening billions of people. Benji explains the bombs operate as a circuit, meaning defusing one bomb will trigger the other unless the detonator is first disabled. At the camp, Ethan discovers Julia and her new husband are leading the medical team at the request of an anonymous donor, implied to be Walker. The bomb countdown is started, and Walker leaves with the detonator by helicopter, while Lane remains behind to die. Luther and Julia work together to defuse one bomb, while Ilsa and Benji subdue Lane and begin defusing the second.

Meanwhile, Ethan hijacks a helicopter and crashes it into Walker's, causing both helicopters to crash on a cliff, leaving one suspended over the edge by its cargo hook. Ethan releases the hook, which impales and kills Walker, before disarming the detonator. The wounded Ethan is recovered to the medical camp by Sloane, who has Lane returned to MI6, freeing Ilsa. Ethan apologizes to Julia for the perils he has put her in, but she expresses gratitude for his efforts to safeguard the world and her new life. Ilsa and Ethan share a moment together as narration by Sloane praises him for caring about every individual life.

== Cast ==
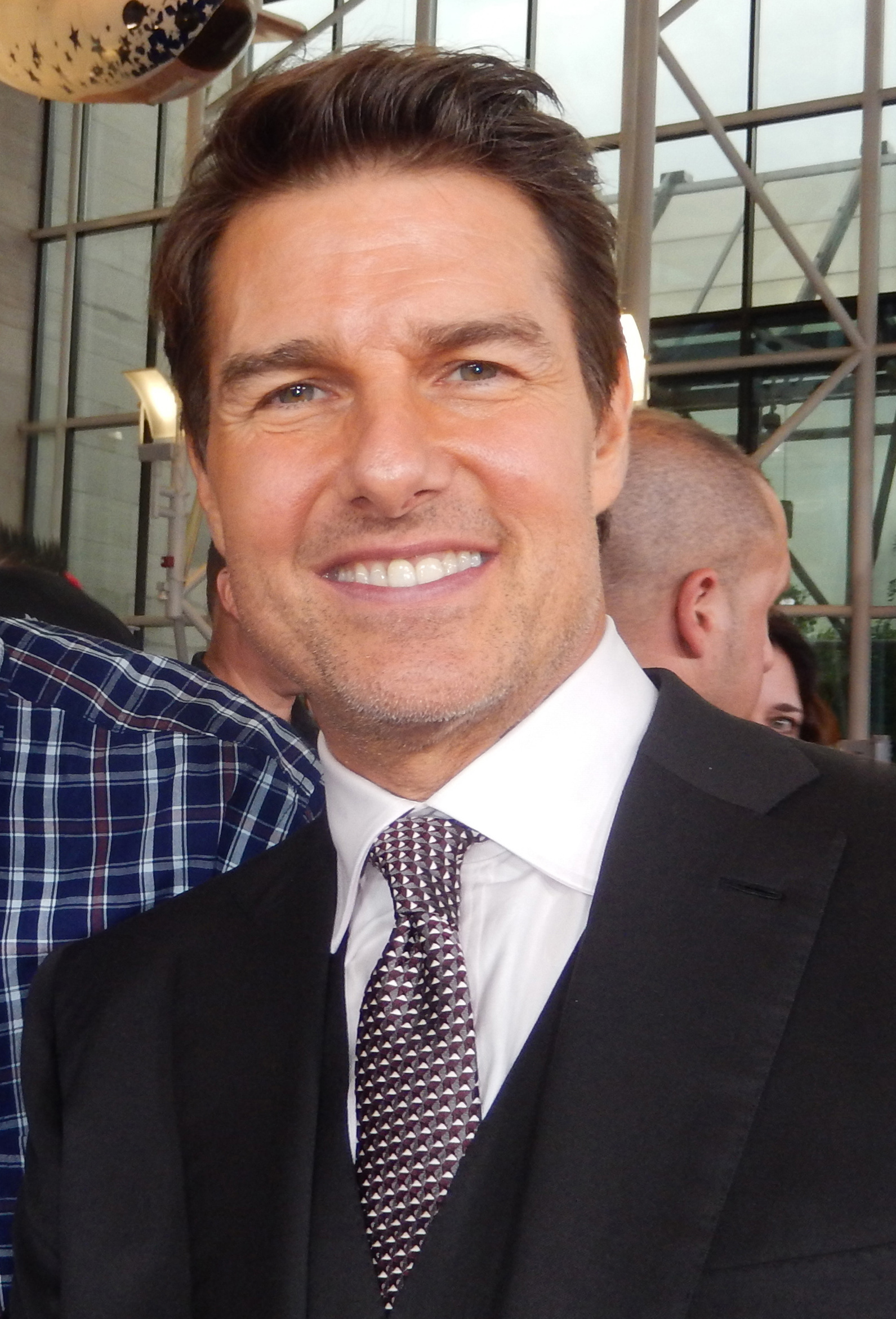
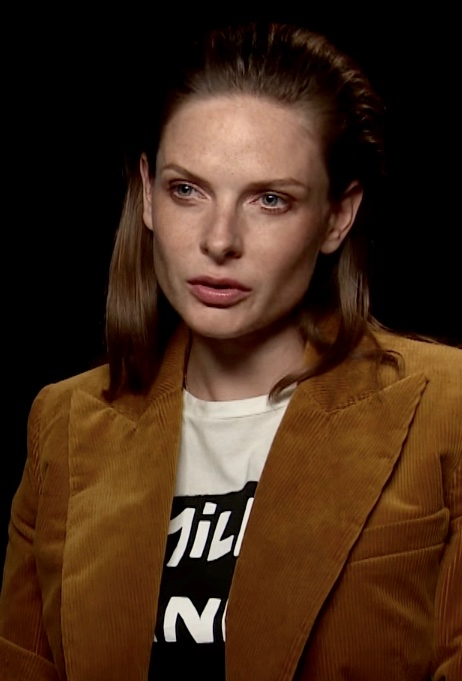
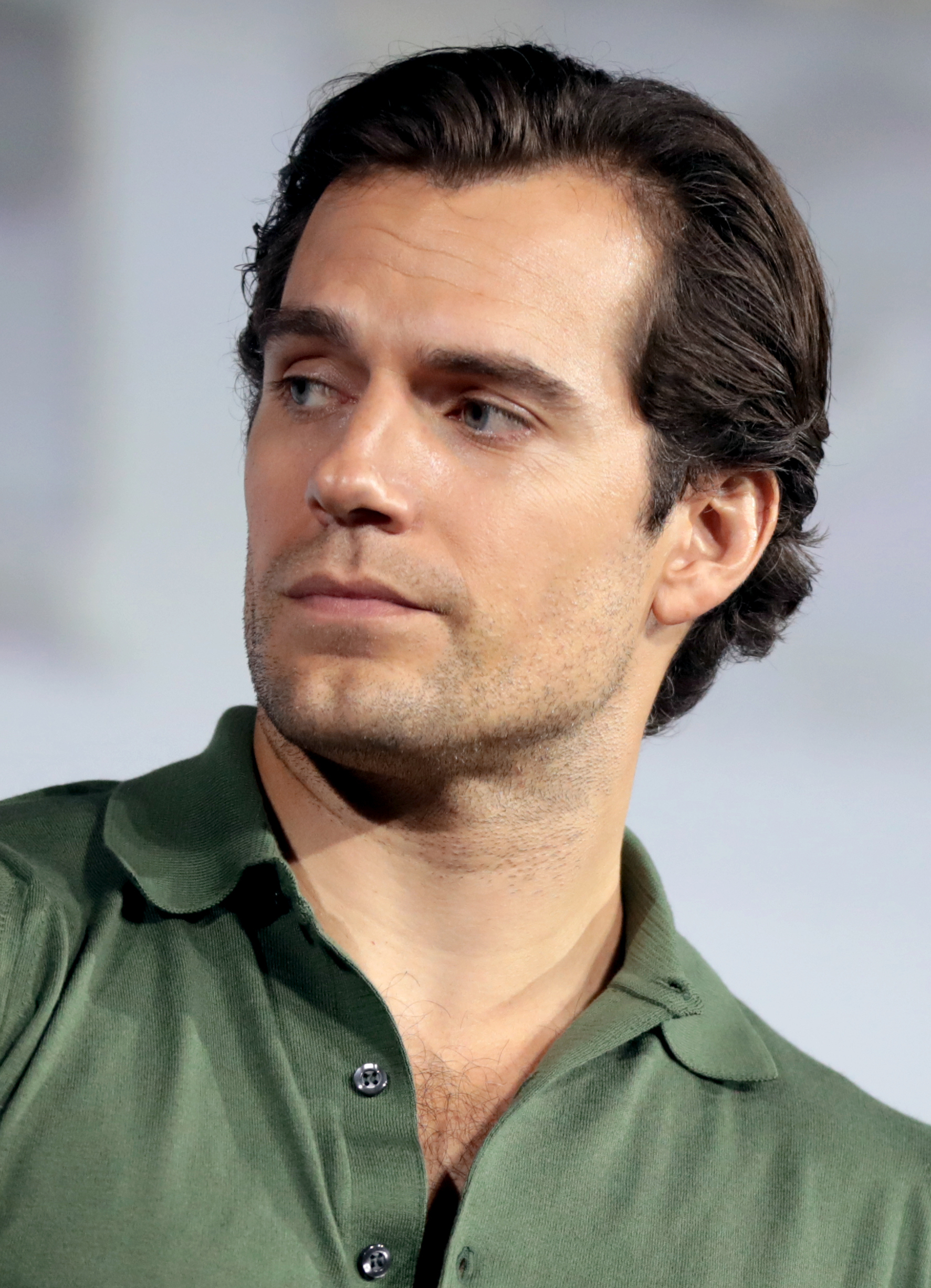
Tom Cruise, Rebecca Ferguson (both pictured in 2018), and Henry Cavill (2019)
- Tom Cruise as Ethan Hunt: A highly skilled, determined, and self-sacrificing IMF agent
- Henry Cavill as August Walker: A ruthless and burly CIA assassin
- Ving Rhames as Luther Stickell: An expert computer hacker and loyal friend to Ethan
- Simon Pegg as Benji Dunn: A skillful IMF technician and Ethan's friend
- Rebecca Ferguson as Ilsa Faust: A cunning and capable MI6 agent
- Sean Harris as Solomon Lane: A clinical ex-MI6 agent turned rogue international terrorist
- Angela Bassett as Erika Sloane: The pragmatic deputy director of the CIA, and Hunley's former assistant
- Vanessa Kirby as Alanna Mitsopolis: A high-level European arms broker and con artist known as The White Widow
- Michelle Monaghan as Julia: A doctor and Ethan's ex-wife who went into hiding from his enemies
- Alec Baldwin as Alan Hunley: The former CIA director now serving as the IMF secretary

The rest of the cast includes Wes Bentley as Erik, Julia's fellow doctor, and husband; Frederick Schmidt as Zola, Alanna's gangster brother; Liang Yang as the decoy John Lark; and Kristoffer Joner as Nils Delbruuk, Lark's nuclear weapons expert. Alix Bénézech portrays a Parisian policewoman; and Caspar Phillipson appears as the European. Fallout also features cameo appearances by news host Wolf Blitzer portraying himself (in actuality a disguise worn by Dunn); disc jockey DJ Harvey as himself; and director Christopher McQuarrie voices Ethan's mission briefing.

== Production ==
=== Development ===
A sixth entry in the Mission: Impossible film series—based on the 1966 TV series of the same name—began development shortly before the successful release of the fifth entry, Mission: Impossible – Rogue Nation, in July 2015. (Note: Attributed to multiple references:) That month, the series' lead actor Tom Cruise announced that filming was planned to begin by August 2016, as production studios Paramount Pictures and Skydance Media wanted a quick turnaround on the sequel.

In November, Christopher McQuarrie, writer and director for Rogue Nation, confirmed he would return to both roles, marking the first time in the series that a director would lead more than one installment. McQuarrie was initially reluctant to return, having found filming Rogue Nation difficult, partly because of the complicated stunt sequences and the expectation that a sequel would exceed them. He was also conscious that fans had come to expect a different director with each installment. Cruise, however, wanted McQuarrie to lead the sequel. McQuarrie, Cruise (via his TC Productions company), J. J. Abrams (via Bad Robot), and Jake Myers served as Fallout's producers; Skydance executives David Ellison, Don Granger, and Dana Goldberg were executive producers. Paramount Pictures and Skydance Media provided the film's finance. (Note: Attributed to multiple references:) Chinese film company Alibaba Pictures provided investment financing in exchange for serving as a local marketing partner in China.

=== Writing ===
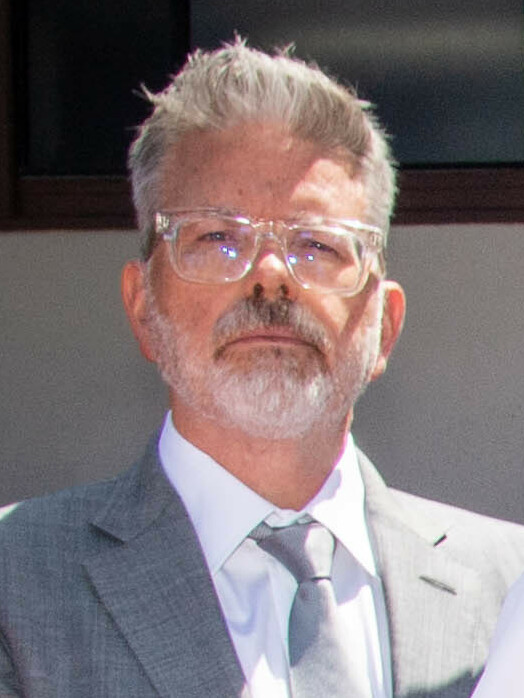
Director and writer Christopher McQuarrie in 2022

McQuarrie wrote the screenplay for Mission: Impossible – Fallout and collaborated with Cruise to develop the narrative. Cruise was particularly interested in resolving the long-running narrative between Ethan and his wife Julia (Michelle Monaghan) which began in Mission: Impossible III (2006) and had received an ambiguous resolution in the fourth film, Mission: Impossible – Ghost Protocol (2011). Fans often asked Cruise about Julia's fate and he wanted to provide them with closure which could also serve as Fallout's primary emotional narrative arc. Cruise and McQuarrie agreed in their early conversations that the film should end with Julia and Ethan completing their story together.

McQuarrie aimed to delve deeper into Ethan's emotions and motivations to foster a stronger emotional connection with the audience. He noted that in previous films, Ethan was somewhat enigmatic, leaving viewers to guess his thoughts. McQuarrie wanted to change that by clearly revealing Ethan's deepest fears and thoughts. As part of this, the original primary narrative involved Ethan assuming Lark's identity for most of the film, forcing him to portray a villainous alter ego and face moral quandaries, tasking him with performing "horrible things" to preserve the greater good. Cruise supported the idea, and it remained part of the script for some time until McQuarrie determined it made Fallout too long, sacrificed action for intellectualism, reduced focus on the supporting characters, and prevented him from including many of the traditional elements fans expected from the Mission: Impossible series.

Several abandoned ideas from Rogue Nation were resurrected for Fallout, including Lane challenging Ethan by asking, "Your mission should you choose to accept it ... did you ever choose not to?", and a motorcade sequence involving Lane which evolved into the Paris heist. McQuarrie and Cruise had discussed wanting to break Lane out of prison in a sequel. The "mousetrap" sequence, in which Ethan, Luther, and Benji trick Delbruuk into revealing details of Lark's bombs, was also intended for Rogue Nation but McQuarrie could not make it work within that film's narrative. He wanted the audience to experience what would happen if the antagonist actually won and how Ethan would feel in response.

A central character was to be killed off during the opening scene of Ethan attempting to purchase the plutonium cores, but McQuarrie did not want to kill Luther or Benji as he did not believe the rest of the film could recover from those deaths. He chose to kill William Brandt (portrayed by Jeremy Renner in Ghost Protocol and Rogue Nation), but the actor declined to return. McQuarrie wrote with a self-imposed rule that the female characters could not be helpless, which initially made it challenging to place them in difficult situations, like having Ilsa captured by Lane. Eventually, he justified it by ensuring she frees herself without help from a man.

According to The Hollywood Reporter, unspecified issues with the script risked derailing the project altogether in July 2016, delaying the start of filming from November 2016 to January 2017. The final script was only 33 pages long. McQuarrie felt this worked for Mission: Impossible films, where a broad outline for locations, sets, and actors is provided, but scenes are adjusted, added, or removed based on how events unfold during filming. He was primarily focused on finding interesting locations to create a "great-looking spy movie".

=== Casting ===
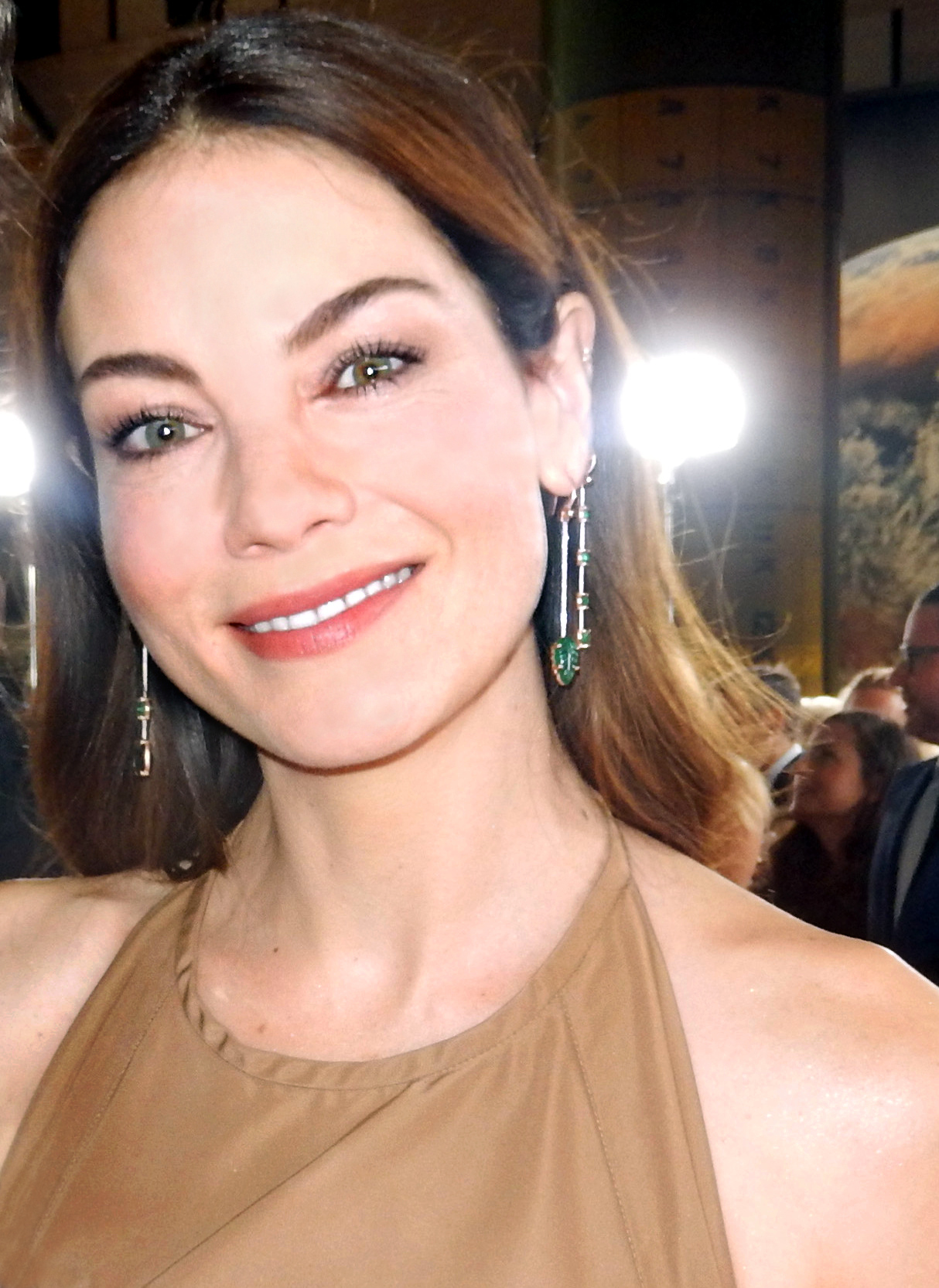
Michelle Monaghan in 2018

Fallout features Cruise, Baldwin, Harris, Ferguson, Pegg, and Rhames reprising their roles from previous Mission: Impossible films. A dispute over Cruise's pay in August 2016 further stalled pre-production, and though resolved by September, it caused several months of further delay in filming from January 2017. Cruise wanted to be paid more than the $11–13 million he received for The Mummy (2017) as well as receiving gross points, a percentage of the initial box office gross received by Paramount and Skydance before any disbursements to the other financial partners are paid. (Note: Attributed to multiple references:) Michelle Monaghan was confirmed to join the cast in June 2017, reprising her role as Julia for the first time in seven years. Ferguson's Rogue Nation contract included an option clause that allowed the studio to commit her to reprise her role as Ilsa Faust in a sequel. She enjoyed portraying a strong woman and embraced performing her own stunts when possible. While concurrently filming scenes for The Kid Who Would Be King (2019), Ferguson was pregnant during early filming of Fallout.

Sean Harris had initially wanted the Solomon Lane character to die in Rogue Nation but returned for Fallout, becoming the series' first recurring villain. McQuarrie and Cruise had determined that killing Lane was not the right choice for Rogue Nation as they already had future ideas for him. Alec Baldwin agreed to reprise his role as Alan Hunley on the condition that the character be killed off. Renner declined to reprise his role as William Brandt, in part because he was committed to filming Avengers: Infinity War (2018)—although he ultimately did not appear in that film—but he had also been displeased with the frequent script changes in the previous films that interfered with his spending time with his family.

Fallout introduces Vanessa Kirby as Alanna Mitsopolis, the White Widow. The character, alongside her brother Zola, are the children of Max, an arms dealer from the original film, Mission: Impossible (1996). Kirby followed a strict exercise regimen to prepare for performing some of her own stunts and regularly ran with a personal trainer. Kirby was concurrently filming the Netflix series The Crown, which required her to film during the day in London before traveling by Eurostar train to Paris for Fallout.

Cavill joined the cast in March 2017. He suggested Walker's mustache-and-stubble aesthetic, and McQuarrie rewrote the character to better match Cavill's dry sense of humor. An unnamed well-known actor was originally set to play the decoy John Lark as a surprise cameo, but in preliminary tests, he was unable to keep pace with Cruise and Cavill during a fight scene between their three characters in a Parisian bathroom. As such, the actor was replaced with stuntman Liang Yang. The police officer encountered on the street by the IMF team was written as a man, but Cruise recommended swapping the gender as he felt a woman (Alix Bénézech) would make the scene more emotionally impactful. Actor Siân Brooke was also cast in an undisclosed role that was cut from the finished film.

=== Filming ===
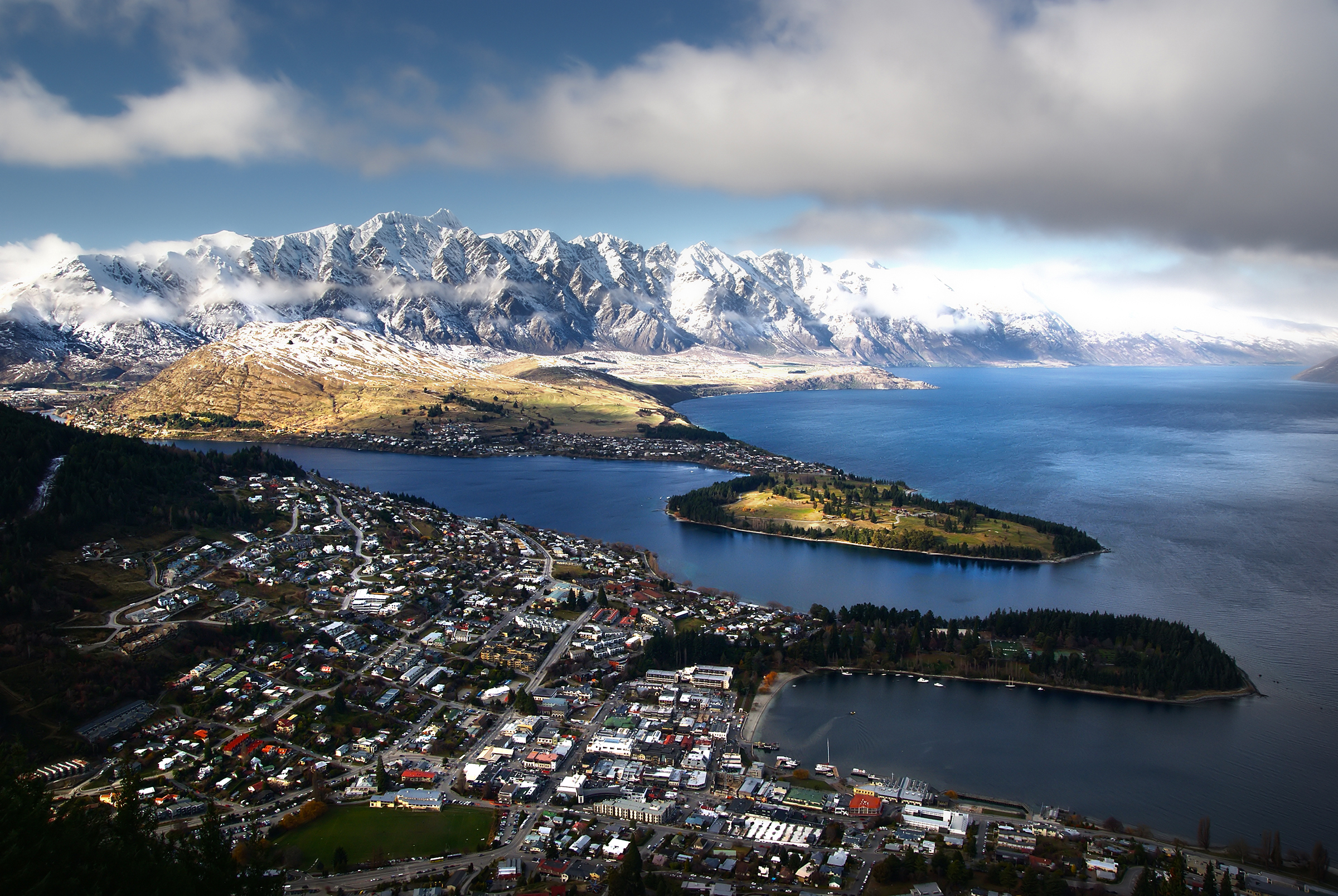
Mission: Impossible – Fallout was filmed in Paris, France, and Queenstown, New Zealand, which stood in for Kashmir.

Principal photography began on April 8, 2017, in Paris, France. Fallout was primarily photographed on 35 mm movie film using Kodak analog film stock and Panavision Millennium XL cameras, which were lightweight and easily switched between handheld and steadicam modes. Aerial scenes were filmed digitally using Panavision DXL cameras because cinematographer Rob Hardy considered it impractical to repeatedly land the aircraft to reload the film stock.

The helicopter carrying the imprisoned Lane was filmed atop the Paris Ministry of Finance. The helicopter weighed 14 t (14,000 kg), but the helipad was only rated to hold four so the pilot hovered the craft imperceptibly above the pad's surface. As the sequence moves under a bridge along the Seine, the area was draped with 300 ft (91 m) of silk to conceal events from onlookers and paparazzi, and the guns used were silent with gunfire being added in post-production. As Ethan and Walker escape in a truck, different parts of the sequence were filmed alternately in clear and rainy weather, but McQuarrie did not believe viewers would notice. Fallout was also filmed at the Trocadéro and Palais-Royal.

In late May, the production moved to New Zealand for 6–8 weeks, primarily to film Fallout's final act. The opening nightmare wedding sequence (filmed at Milford Sound) between Julia and Ethan was among the first scenes filmed to accommodate Monaghan's conflicting schedule on The Path (2015–2018). Baldwin was intended but unavailable to portray the minister and was replaced by Harris. There was only an hour on a specific day to film the scene, but the typically clement weather had turned cloudy and cold, making the actors' breath visible. McQuarrie decided this worked for the nightmare sequence, as the warm-looking background contrasting with the visible breath signaled to the audience that something was wrong from the start. McQuarrie wanted a warmer visual color tone for Fallout to visually convey it as a major summer film, but the delayed production meant scenes would be filmed in locations during the winter. He only wanted the scene of Ethan waking up following the nightmare to appear cold to represent Ethan's lonely existence. Hardy found this cliché, so he made the set look cold while lighting it warmly. Because the abandoned building used for filming was already cold, Cruise was surrounded by heaters that gave him a red glow.

The Kashmir sequences were filmed in Queenstown. India was extensively scouted to film Kashmir scenes there because McQuarrie wanted Fallout to have a more political narrative, but he could not secure permission to film there. For the camp scenes, Julia was scripted to have a baby, but McQuarrie opted to remove this only two days before her scenes were filmed. There were only five hours of daylight for each filming day, so the set was arranged to give Monaghan the best natural light for her character's reveal. The schedule only allowed Cruise eight minutes to film his side of the conversation between Ethan and Julia. In Fallout's final scene, Ferguson improvised Ilsa whispering something unintelligible to Julia. The film ends with a shot of Ethan in a medical bed. The planned ending was longer, but the camera ran out of film, and the resulting flash of white was used as a transition to the credits. Cruise was reluctant to end Fallout this way, but McQuarrie felt the film was already too long and the improvised ending fitting.

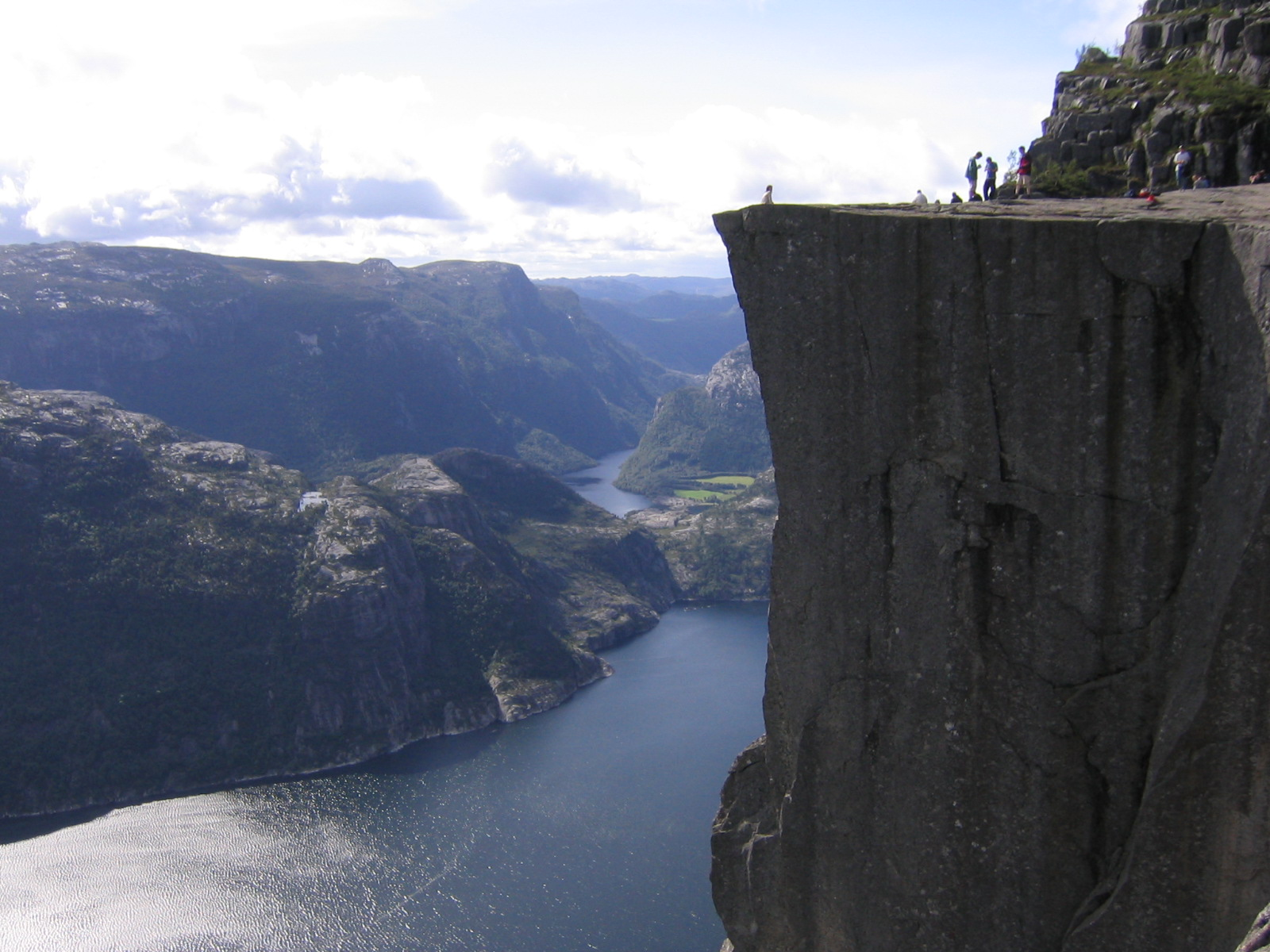
Pulpit Rock, Norway, is the location of the final battle between Ethan Hunt and August Walker.

The production relocated to London in early July, filming in locations such as Blackfriars Bridge and Tate Modern. Cavill's mustache became a source of conflict when he needed to reprise his role as Superman for reshoots of Justice League (2017) and had to be clean-shaven. McQuarrie, unwilling to let Cavill shave unless compensated, requested $3 million from the Justice League production to cover the costs of digitally re-adding Cavill's facial hair back for Fallout until it regrew. Paramount eventually intervened and refused permission altogether, necessitating the mustache to be digitally removed for Justice League.

In August, Cruise broke his right ankle after colliding with a wall during a stunt jump between buildings for a foot pursuit scene. (Note: Attributed to multiple references:) Cruise completed the scene and moved off camera before acknowledging his injury; the footage was used in Fallout. Production was expected to shut down for two to three months while Cruise recovered. McQuarrie used the hiatus to improve underdeveloped scenes around the pursuit as they lacked compelling drama, some filming locations had not yet been secured, such as St Paul's Cathedral, and Benji's interactions with Ethan were still being determined. Editor Eddie Hamilton and his team also began processing existing footage to save time later.

Cruise focused on rehabilitation due to concerns that too long a delay would force Fallout to miss its planned July 27, 2018, release date. He was not fully recovered when he returned to filming in October, after 7–8 weeks. (Note: Attributed to multiple references:) He filmed several scenes with his injured ankle, including completing the foot pursuit, the meeting in London between the IMF (the scene takes place around a table so that Cruise and Baldwin—who was awaiting double hip replacement surgery—could lean on it for relief), and the climactic cliff-top battle between Ethan and Walker on Pulpit Rock, Norway, filmed in November. (Note: Attributed to multiple references:)

The limited script outline allowed for many scenes to be added, developed, or removed throughout filming. The initial meeting between Ethan and Walker was re-shot because Walker's role had evolved throughout filming. Similarly, a planned confrontation between Ilsa and Alanna was removed because of the well-received chemistry between Cruise and Kirby during a riverside dialogue scene. The scene, in which Ethan is gifted one of the cores by Alanna, was added only days before it was filmed as McQuarrie had struggled to explain how only two cores remained by the finale. The opening scene, in which the cores are stolen, was reworked to add banter between Cruise and his teammates because the intended suspenseful tone was not making for an interesting scene. Principal photography officially concluded on February 22, 2018.

=== Visual effects and stunts ===
Fallout's approximately 2,000 visual effects shots were supervised by Jody Johnson and developed by DNEG, Bluebolt, One of Us, Lola, The Third Floor, and Blind. The majority of their work contributed to realizing the three main action sequences—the High Altitude Low Opening (HALO) jump and the Paris and helicopter chases. This also involved cleanup such as concealing cameras and crew reflected in mirrors during the bathroom fight. Other contributions included adding digital cars and backgrounds in some public spaces where the area had been blocked off to avoid paparazzi.

The HALO jump over Paris was planned over a year and filmed after principal photography. Filming took place in the United Arab Emirates as it was the only area that would legally allow them to perform the stunt. One of the world's largest wind tunnels was built to train for the sequence, and though the facility was also considered for filming, McQuarrie and Cruise found it looked unrealistic. Cruise performed the single-take stunt 106 times, including practice jumps, falling at speeds of 200 to 220 mph (320 to 350 km/h) from 25,000 to 30,000 ft (7,600 to 9,100 m) from a Boeing C-17 Globemaster III accompanied by a camera operator. (Note: Attributed to multiple references:) To prepare for each jump, Cruise inhaled pure oxygen for 20 minutes to avoid decompression sickness. His helmet also provided oxygen and was designed to clearly show his face to enhance the realism. Each jump allowed only three minutes of filming per day, as it was filmed close to sunset, allowing just enough light to see the actors clearly. This resulted in three successful takes. CGI vapor was added to Cruise's helmet, and DNEG digitally replaced the desert background with a stormy Parisian landscape and inserted the Grand Palais where Ethan lands. Matching the camera movements to the digital backdrop was difficult, requiring fifteen tracking artists to make necessary adjustments.

The motorbike segment, in which Ethan rides the wrong way against seventy stunt drivers around the Arc de Triomphe, was filmed in 90 minutes early on a Sunday morning when it could be closed due to light traffic. Ethan crashing his motorcycle and being thrown from the vehicle was a practical stunt. The bike was fixed to a hydraulic rig synchronized to the movement of the car with which it collides, while Cruise, attached to a cable, was lifted away at the point of impact.

The helicopter pursuit was filmed in Norway and New Zealand. (Note: Attributed to multiple references:) Cruise insisted on filming Ethan's rope climb up to a flying Airbus BK17 helicopter even though McQuarrie considered it uninteresting. For the following scene in which Ethan commandeers the craft, Cruise earned a pilot's license in 12 days and spent about 18 months training for the stunt. Variations were filmed showing Ethan having either little or no knowledge about flying to provide options in post-production. Cavill leant out of his own craft in 0 °C (32 °F) winds firing a M249 light machine gun; he received weapons training from McQuarrie's brother, Doug. The helicopter noise prevented Cavill from hearing any instructions, and he improvised much of his performance. The helicopter chase resulted in 70 hours of footage which was edited to just 7.5 minutes. The scene of Ethan's helicopter crashing into Walker's was a CGI effect combined with a practical chopper body (designed by Neil Corbould). Ethan's craft was suspended from a wire between two cranes at Hagrid's Hill, Leavesden Studios in England, allowing it to travel 100 ft (30 m) before crashing. The scene was enhanced by DNEG to add snow, extend helicopter blades, and hang Walker's helicopter from the face of Pulpit Rock as a practical model was disallowed due to risks of damaging the rock face. Safety wires and cranes were removed from Cruise and Cavill as their characters fought atop the rock. Walker's facial disfigurement from the crash was suggested by Cruise five days before the scene was filmed and involved a prosthetic appliance.

=== Post-production ===
McQuarrie considered the theatrical cut to be the definitive version of the film, saying any deleted scenes were those whose inclusion could not be justified. Deleted scenes included Benji, disguised as Lane, expositing to Walker, and Mitsopolis singing in her initial appearance, which McQuarrie believed undermined the tension. Her introductory speech was a combination of existing footage not showing her singing and reshot footage. Scenes of Ilsa and Ethan kissing were filmed, one scripted and one improvised, but McQuarrie felt they weakened her character, removed future potential romantic tension, and interfered with Ethan's unresolved relationship with Julia. A multi-page scripted scene explaining Ilsa's and Ethan's relationship was trimmed to one line: "You should've come with me." Ilsa was also introduced earlier in the Parisian club, but this was changed to her surprise appearance saving Ethan in the club bathroom. A scene of Walker reaching for his gun when confronted by the female French police officer was filmed in post-production to add tension. Hunley's death had not been confirmed when the scene was filmed, but the filmmakers determined it was the correct choice. Cruise suggested his final line, "Go", which Baldwin recorded on his phone at home. Baldwin was also intended to narrate the opening mission briefing, but McQuarrie replaced him because he found Baldwin's voice was too "velvety".

The "what if" scenarios in previous Mission: Impossible films visualized how their plans would play out with explanatory narration. However, McQuarrie chose not to include narration in the scene portraying the hypothetical future of Ethan attacking Lane's police convoy and fatally injuring an officer. The absence of narration aimed to keep the audience uncertain about the scene's reality.

Shortly after filming concluded, a 170-minute cut was screened for about 70 of the cast's and crew's friends and family at the Soho Hotel, London. Hamilton described a positive reaction tempered with clear improvements that needed to be made. New versions were screened every two weeks for American test audiences thereafter. The ending where Lane is given to Mitsopolis was intended as the final scene because Cruise did not want to end with Ethan in a medical bed, but test audiences preferred the latter option. McQuarrie intercut both scenes instead, ending with Ethan. Blood was also added digitally to the decoy Lark's death because the audiences did not find the scene humorous without it. More footage was filmed based on feedback about seven weeks after principal photography, but feedback was consistent in improving the film's pace. By the fourth screening, McQuarrie and Hamilton reduced the runtime to 147 minutes, which earned the highest audience scores and became the theatrical cut. The studio requested further trims to reduce the runtime, but each attempt received lower scores. Permission was secured to play the opening studio logos at double speed to save some time. (Note: Attributed to multiple references:)

The final budget for Mission: Impossible – Fallout is estimated at $178–180 million, with another $150 million allocated for promotion and distribution. The delays caused by Cruise's injury inflated the budget to about $250 million, including paying to retain the cast and crew in the interim. Most of these costs were repaid by the film's insurance.

=== Music ===
The Mission: Impossible – Fallout score was composed by Lorne Balfe. He was recommended to McQuarrie by Paramount head of music Randy Spendlove, and already had connections with producer Jake Myers as well as Paramount and Skydance. The score was written over eight to nine months. Balfe's writing office was adjacent to the editing room, allowing him and McQuarrie to collaborate and experiment with rapid changes in the score to match the edits. McQuarrie only used Balfe's score when reviewing scenes, as he did not like using the standard process of placeholder temp music. The 90-minute score was recorded over 30 days at two large London stages, using 300 musicians that included 100 string players, 80 choristers, 42 brass players, 14 drummers, 12 bongo players, and a few woodwind players. Balfe based each piece of the score on the original Mission: Impossible television series theme. He found writing for the mission briefing scene the most difficult because it had to support the tone of the scene without overwhelming the expository dialogue.

== Release ==
=== Marketing ===
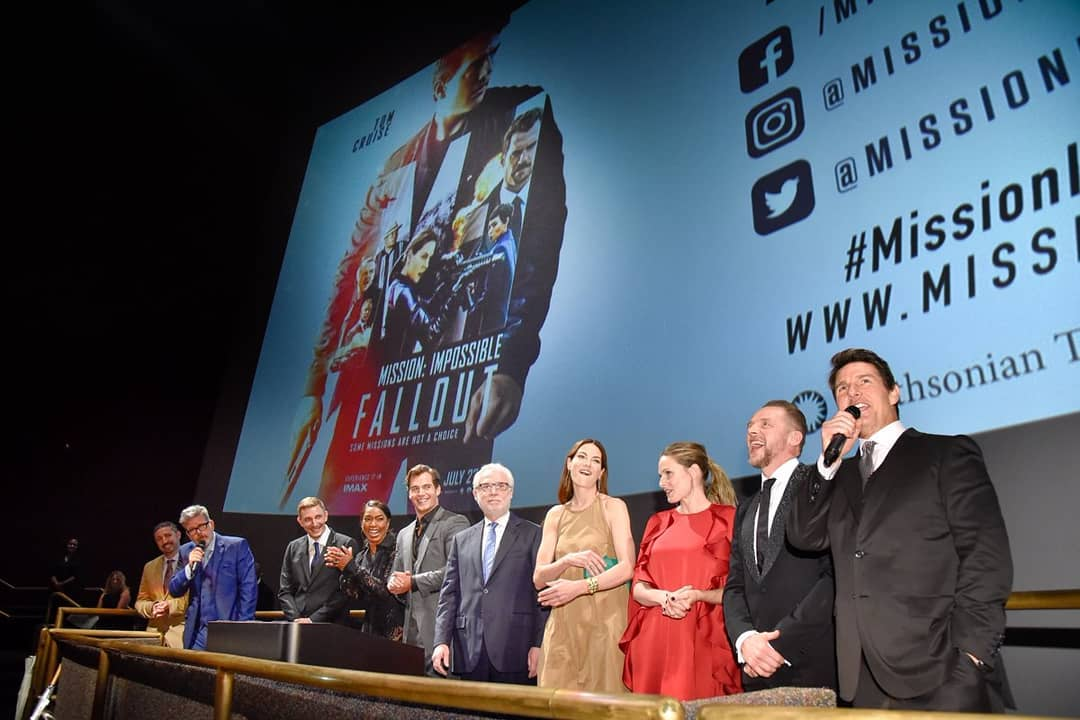
The cast and crew of Mission: Impossible – Fallout at a promotional screening of the film in July 2018.

The title, Mission: Impossible – Fallout, was announced in January 2018. About $140 million was spent on the film's global marketing campaign which focused on behind-the-scenes featurettes promoting the film's depiction of realistic stunt and action sequences instead of CGI. The first trailer debuted during Super Bowl LII in February 2018 (receiving 24.6 million views by July), and the HALO jump scene was promoted at CinemaCon and the 2018 NBA Finals, as well as being shown on YouTube and running before theatrical screenings of every number 1 theatrical film for 14 weeks. Paramount published a virtual reality version of the jump on Oculus VR, YouTube's VR channel, and Facebook's Entertainment and 360° pages. Fallout was also promoted throughout the 2018 FIFA World Cup, and at international airports.

Deadline Hollywood reported the film had about 245 million social media impressions across the actors' individual pages, Facebook, Twitter, YouTube, and Instagram, exceeding the typical 168 million for an action-adventure film. Paramount's parent company Viacom promoted Fallout with different content across most of its own global television networks, including a 30-minute Making-of special, and Cruise personally promoted the film in markets such as the UK, Tokyo, and Seoul. Fallout also received the most promotional partner funding in the franchise with $135 million spent worldwide. This included Amazon Prime, BMW, Kärcher, Airbus, Shell, LG, M&M's, and Uber, as well as an ESPN promo with James Harden, a Visa screening program/partnership, and an American Ninja Warrior themed episode.

Media analyst Jeff Bock said that, as in 2017, there was a deluge of sequels but 2018's offerings were ones audiences actually wanted to watch, including Ant-Man and the Wasp, Jurassic World: Fallen Kingdom, Mission: Impossible – Fallout, and The First Purge. Pre-release estimates suggested Mission: Impossible – Fallout would earn $48–$65 million during its opening weekend in the United States and Canada, and $75–$80 million from 36 other countries for a weekend total of $135 million. (Note: Attributed to multiple references:) Industry tracking showed 82% of audiences polled were aware of the film, with 42% showing "definite interest" in it.

=== Box office ===
The premiere of Mission: Impossible – Fallout took place at the Palais de Chaillot in Paris on July 12, 2018, with a UK premiere the following day. Fallout was released in the United States and Canada on July 27. During its opening weekend, the film grossed $61.2 million from 4,836 theaters—an average of $13,961 per theater—making it the number one film of the weekend, ahead of Mamma Mia! Here We Go Again ($15.1 million) and The Equalizer 2 ($14 million), both in their second weekends. This included $7.5 million from 406 IMAX screen previews or 12% of the weekend total gross, with a series-best $6 million grossed from Thursday night previews (a record later broken by Mission: Impossible – Dead Reckoning Part One (2023) with $7 million). (Note: Attributed to multiple references:) The weekend total figure gave Fallout the highest 3-day opening in the franchise, ahead of Mission: Impossible 2's (2000) $57.8 million, and later beaten by Mission: Impossible – The Final Reckoning (2025) with $64 million. Fallout's opening weekend also represented Cruise's second-highest of his career, behind War of the Worlds (2005) $64.8 million. (Note: Attributed to multiple references:)

It retained the number one position in its second weekend with a gross of $35.3 million (the highest-grossing second weekend in the franchise), ahead of the debuts of Christopher Robin ($24.6 million) and The Spy Who Dumped Me ($12.1 million). It fell to the number two position in its third weekend with a gross of $19.4 million, behind the debut of The Meg ($45.4 million) and ahead of Christopher Robin ($13 million). Although Fallout never reclaimed the number one position, it remained in the top ten-highest-grossing films for a total of 8 weeks, grossing a total of $220.2 million. This made Fallout the eighth-highest-grossing film of 2018, ahead of Ant-Man and the Wasp ($216.6 million) and behind Jumanji: Welcome to the Jungle ($232.5 million).

Outside of the U.S. and Canada, Fallout overperformed against projections to gross $94.6 million during its opening weekend in 36 countries, including the UK, Russia, Spain, South Korea, Latin America, and most of Asia. This gave a cumulative worldwide gross of $155.8 million, surpassing Rogue Nation's $131.5 million worldwide opening weekend. (Note: Attributed to multiple references:) Fallout opened at number one in 29 countries, its highest grosses originating from Korea ($24.9 million), the UK ($9.5 million), India ($8.2 million), Taiwan ($5.4 million), and Mexico ($4.9 million). The film opened in a further 20 countries by the end of August including China and Japan. In total, Fallout grossed $571 million in these markets, including China ($181.2 million), South Korea ($49.8 million), Japan ($42.4 million), the UK ($31.1 million), France ($27.1 million), Germany ($15.9 million), India ($15.9 million), Taiwan ($14.6 million), Australia ($14.2 million), and Mexico ($11.9 million).

Worldwide, Fallout grossed $791.1 million, making it the highest-grossing film in the franchise and the eighth-highest-grossing film of the year, ahead of Deadpool 2 ($734.5 million) and behind Venom ($856.1 million). Those involved with the film and rival studios estimated that Fallout would have to earn $560–$650 million before it would become profitable. Analysis by Deadline Hollywood suggested that it was not expected to generate a profit until its home media release. This was partly because those involved were guaranteed a share of the initial box office gross, including Cruise, Abrams, and Skydance, which reduced the profits returned to Paramount.

=== Home media ===
The film soundtrack was released digitally and on compact disc in July 2018. Mission: Impossible – Fallout was released as a digital download in November 2018, followed in December with 4K Ultra HD Blu-ray, Blu-ray, and DVD releases. (Note: Attributed to multiple references:) All versions except the DVD contain special features including audio commentaries by McQuarrie, Cruise, Balfe, and Hamilton, "Behind the Fallout" – a 7-part documentary covering the film's production and characters – deleted scenes, storyboards, and the film's trailer. Fallout was also released in a collection alongside the five previous Mission: Impossible films. The soundtrack received a vinyl record release in July 2019.

== Reception ==
=== Critical response ===
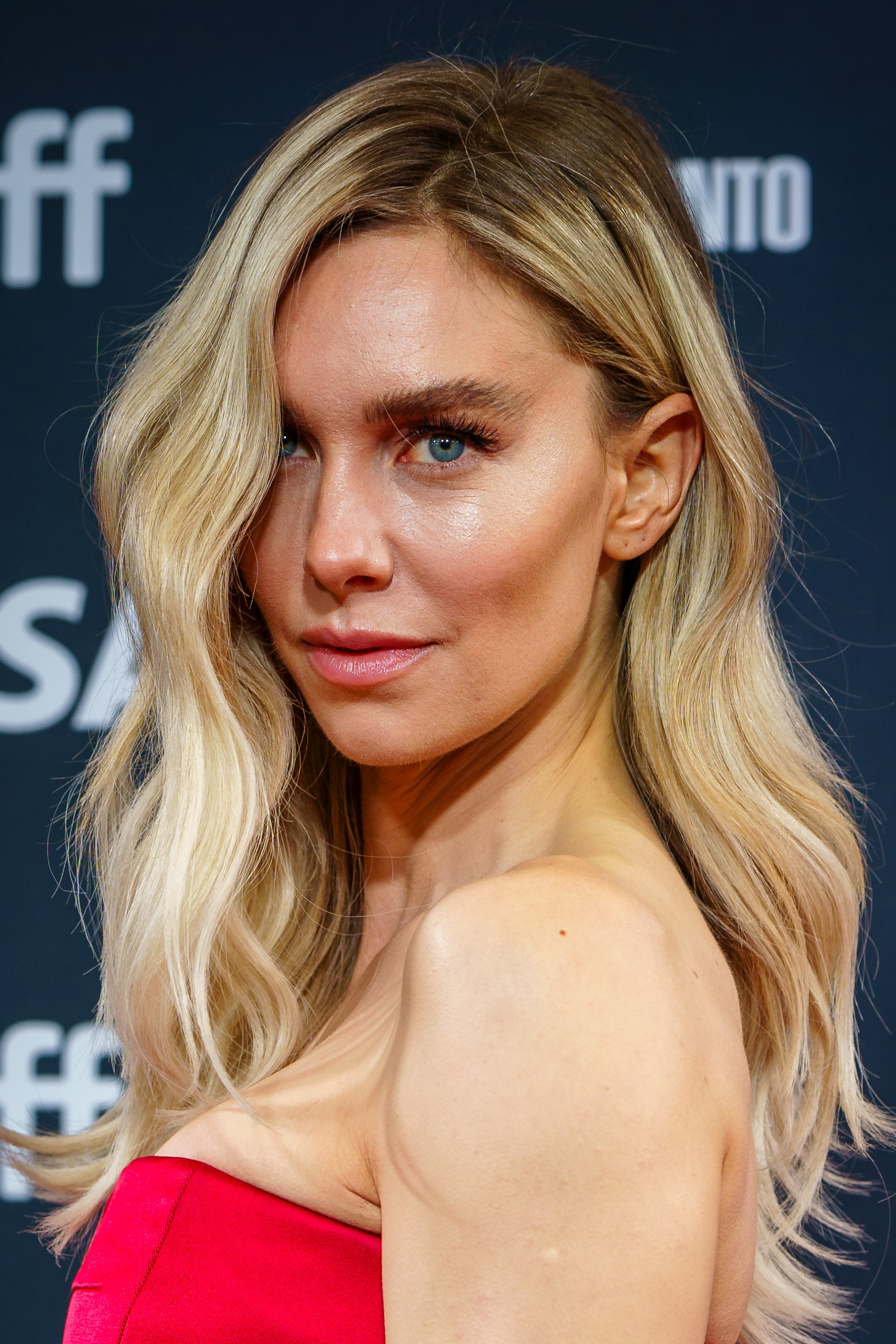
Critics singled out the stand-out performance of Vanessa Kirby with praise (pictured in 2024)

Mission: Impossible – Fallout received critical praise, and was among the most critically acclaimed films of 2018, with 53 critics placing it among the year's top 10 films. (Note: Attributed to multiple references:) The website Rotten Tomatoes reported that 98% of 444 critics gave the film a positive review, making it the highest rated Mission: Impossible film. The website's consensus reads: "Fast, sleek, and fun, Mission: Impossible – Fallout lives up to the 'impossible' part of its name by setting yet another high mark for insane set pieces in a franchise full of them." On Metacritic, the film has a weighted average score of 87 out of 100, based on 60 critics, indicating "universal acclaim". Audiences polled by PostTrak gave Fallout an 84% overall positive score with 65% recommending it, and CinemaScore reported filmgoers gave it an average grade of "A" on an A+ to F scale, the highest response in the franchise.

Richard Roeper and Stephanie Zacharek, among others, praised Fallout as one of, if not the best films in the franchise. (Note: Attributed to multiple references:) RogerEbert.com's Brian Tallerico and IndieWire's David Ehrlich described it as one of the best action films ever made, comparing it favorably to Die Hard (1988) and Mad Max: Fury Road (2015). The action sequences were praised by critics such as Leonard Maltin and Peter Travers, particularly for the realism provided by Cruise performing his own stunts. (Note: Attributed to multiple references:) Writing for PopMatters, J.R. Kinnard said the closing action sequence in Kashmir set the new standard for extravagant action sequences, although Michael Phillips considered the violence in the sequence to be excessive.

Writing for Salon.com, Matthew Rozsa found the narrative predictable but enjoyable. He praised the introspection of the "intriguing" moral dilemma concerning Hunt's dedication to preserving life and the greater good despite the personal costs to himself. Writing for Time Out, Dan Jolin wrote that McQuarrie returning as director gave Fallout an evolved narrative continuity lacking in previous installments, although Slate's Sam Adams criticized the seemingly improvisational nature of some scenes that left some narrative threads abandoned. In particular, Adams lamented "provocative" ideas that are posited and ignored, such as the villains' plans to bomb holy cities. Critics such as James Berardinelli and Peter Bradshaw favorably compared the film and the Mission: Impossible series to the James Bond film series. USA Today's Brian Truitt and Entertainment Weekly's Chris Nashawaty said Fallout's combination of exotic locations, espionage, and action had successfully established the series as the standard for international action-adventure films, and Cruise as the modern James Bond.

Cruise's performance was praised by critics such as Maltin and the Chicago Reader's J.R. Jones, (Note: Attributed to multiple references:) with Kinnard, Rozsa, and Jolin commending his commitment to performing his own stunts. Reviews suggested that Cruise's stunt work was a significant aspect of the series' appeal. (Note: Attributed to multiple references:) Roeper wrote that Cruise successfully embodied Ethan's world-weary cynicism yet unwavering determination to combat those who would harm innocents. Cavill's performance was described as "wooden" and uninteresting by Kinnard and The Washington Post's Ann Hornaday, although Hornaday said his physical presence made him a suitable foil for Ethan. Roeper wrote that Cavill's performance fit Walker's persona as someone lacking humanity.

Phillips and Empire's Helen O'Hara, among others, praised the returning cast of Rhames, Pegg, Baldwin, and Harris, while lamenting the film's focus on Ethan left little room to develop their characters. (Note: Attributed to multiple references:) Zacharek wrote that Pegg and Rhames made Cruise more relatable by association, although Kinnard felt that Pegg's humor and Harris's "delightfully wicked" portrayal were underused. Ferguson was praised by reviewers such as Screen Daily's Tim Grierson and Berardinelli for her smart, formidable, and captivating performance and "palpable" romantic chemistry with Cruise. David Edelstein said that she upstaged the other cast as the franchise's standout character. Kirby was also well received by critics such as Kenneth Turan for her captivating and engaging portrayal that provided some of the film's more interesting moments. (Note: Attributed to multiple references:)

=== Accolades ===
At the 72nd British Academy Film Awards in 2018, Mission: Impossible – Fallout was nominated for Best Sound (Gilbert Lake, James H. Mather, Christopher Munro, and Mike Prestwood Smith). For the 44th People's Choice Awards, the film was nominated for Action Movie of 2018 and Movie of 2018, as well as Action Movie Star of 2018 and Male Movie Star of 2018 (both Cruise). Fallout won Best Action Movie at the 24th Critics' Choice Awards and was nominated for Best Visual Effects. At the 45th Saturn Awards, Fallout was named Best Action or Adventure Film and was nominated for Best Actor (Cruise), Best Writing (McQuarrie), and Best Special Effects (Andrew Booth, Neil Corbould, Huw J. Evans, and Jody Johnson).

The stunt crew were nominated for Outstanding Performance by a Stunt Ensemble in a Motion Picture at the 25th Screen Actors Guild Awards. Jody Johnson and Eddie Hamilton won respective awards for Best Visual Effects and Best Film Editing from the Seattle Film Critics Society; Rob Hardy and Lorne Balfe received separate nominations for Best Cinematography and Best Original Score, and the film received a nomination for Best Picture. The 2019 Location Managers Guild Awards gave awards for Outstanding Locations in Contemporary Films (David Campbell-Bell and Ben Piltz) and Outstanding Film Commission (KJ Jennings – Film Otago Southland).

== Thematic analysis ==
=== Morality and sacrifice ===
Fallout delves into Ethan's moral struggles as he grapples with the weight of saving countless lives. Originally, McQuarrie envisioned Ethan adopting the Lark persona for the majority of Fallout, forcing him into morally gray acts to safeguard the greater good. The title Fallout was chosen both to represent the literal nuclear threat and the fallout of Ethan's actions. Critic Matthew Rozsa wrote that Fallout challenges Ethan to face the repercussions of his well-intentioned decisions, particularly his unwavering stance against sacrificing innocent lives. His dilemma lies in caring deeply about every individual, both his strength and vulnerability. (Note: Attributed to multiple references:)

According to analysis by RogerEbert.com, some characters see Ethan's refusal to sacrifice lives unnecessarily as his greatest asset. However, Ethan regularly gives little value to his own life, entering into one dangerous situation after another. Fallout elucidates that a man like Hunt continuously endangers his life and opts to undertake impossible missions because he possesses the ability to save people and cannot bear the thought of allowing deaths through his own inaction. (Note: Attributed to multiple references:) Critic Peter Debruge posited that Ethan's steadfast, heroic persona serves a dual purpose narratively and practically, leveraging Cruise's public image as a moralistic cinema star who portrays characters with a conscience and steadfast convictions.

Fallout also explores the toll Ethan's life takes on him and those close to him. Debruge observed that Ethan's marriage to Julia falters, partly because she realizes his duty to protect the world outweighs his commitment to her. Critic Nick Allen points out that unlike typical tropes, such as motivating the male protagonist through the death of a loved one, as seen in Casino Royale (2006) and The Dark Knight (2008), the Mission: Impossible series, including Fallout, sidesteps this narrative convention. As Fallout concludes, the evolving nature of their relationship is evident, revealing that Julia has forged her own path independently, without waiting for Ethan, symbolizing growth for both characters. Due to Ethan's established connection with Julia, his dynamic with Ilsa remains primarily platonic, allowing Ilsa to be portrayed as a fully developed character distinct from her relationship with Ethan. Ilsa, depicted as Ethan's equal in the world of espionage, possesses the capability to protect herself in perilous situations, relieving Ethan from compromising his career for a romantic relationship.

In contrast to Ethan's self-sacrificing nature, his adversaries are indifferent to life, viewing the current world order as corrupt and in need of destruction. Their ideology dictates that great suffering must be inflicted to achieve an even greater peace. (Note: Attributed to multiple references:) Lane's motivations are fueled by a desire for vengeance against Ethan, intending to inflict suffering by placing Julia and Ethan's friends at the center of a potential nuclear explosion. Walker represents the antithesis of Ethan's measured approach, described as a "hammer" who achieves his objectives regardless of collateral damage. Tallerico reflects on how Fallout prompts a consideration between Ethan's ethical approach and Walker's ruthless efficiency.

=== Aging ===
Film professor Lisa Purse examined the cultural perceptions of and media interest in Cruise's relatively youthful appearance compared to his age (56-years-old when Fallout was released). His commitment to real stunts and physicality contrasts with the age-related decline typically seen in his aging action-star contemporaries. Professor Kelvin Ke Jinde's considered age to be typically associated with decline and decay, but also representing maturity and personal growth, which, aided by the longevity of the Mission: Impossible series, allowed the Ethan character to evolve over several decades and reshape the representation of the ageing hero. Purse acknowledges Cruise's significant investment in cosmetic products, procedures, and physical conditioning, but argues that his action performances defy stereotypes of aging decline by showcasing physically demanding feats.

Ke Jinde and Dr Glen Donnar delve into the resurgence of aging action stars like Arnold Schwarzenegger, Sylvester Stallone, and Bruce Willis, reviving '80s action franchises characterized by simplistic, violence-driven portrayals of hyper-masculinity. Jinde observes the evolution in representations of aging heroes, especially Ethan in the Mission: Impossible series. The modern aging hero focuses on social connections, self-sacrifice, and action beyond violence, reshaping the perception of mature heroes. This transformation involves sacrifices such as Ethan's choice to end his relationship with Julia and forgo a settled family life, driven by his sense of responsibility to the world.

Donnar's analysis focuses on how attention is diverted from the spectacle of these stars' once idealized, younger, muscular bodies, with an emphasis on oversized weaponry, fetishized vehicles, and even digital recreations of their younger forms. According to Donnar, Cruise never possessed the same hypermuscular form of actors like Schwarzenegger or Stallone, instead presenting a smaller, leaner, and sexualized appearance. As Cruise aged, and his physical appearance could no longer serve as primarily a subject of physical objectification as it had in his youth, discussion shifted to emphasize and celebrate his stunt work.

=== Fake news ===
Analysts Rebecca Keegan and Matt Miller, and media educator Brett Lamb, analyzed an early scene in which the IMF trick Nils Delbruuk into divulging information about Lark's bombs through a fabricated news broadcast, drawing parallels between this fictional scenario and real-world concerns about the rise of fake news. Their analyses reflected contemporary concerns about political attacks on journalism, organized misinformation, declining public trust in media, and the difficulty of distinguishing truth from fiction. Keegan argued that the use of real news figures such as Wolf Blitzer in fictional news broadcasts, while adding an element of realism, blurred the distinction between journalism and entertainment. Deborah Potter, a former network correspondent, and Duy Linh Tu, a journalism professor, voiced apprehensions regarding the implications of this cameo appearance.

== Legacy ==
=== Modern reception ===
As of the release of the eighth installment, Mission: Impossible – The Final Reckoning, in 2025, Fallout remains the highest-grossing installment in the series, and is the highest-critically rated entry according to aggregated scores by Rotten Tomatoes and Metacritic. Among the films in the Mission: Impossible franchise, Fallout is frequently ranked as the best installment, only occasionally ranking second behind Ghost Protocol, Rogue Nation, or Dead Reckoning. (Note: Attributed to multiple references:) Cavill's August Walker has also been repeatedly listed as among the top three Mission: Impossible antagonists, alongside Solomon Lane and Owen Davian (Mission: Impossible III). (Note: Attributed to multiple references:) A retrospective assessment by /Film stated that a protagonist is only as memorable as his antagonist, highlighting Walker as a great villain because of his imposing physicality and charm. McQuarrie mentioned that he received "endless grief" from fans on social media for killing off Walker.

In the years since its release, several publications, such as Esquire, IndieWire, and Time Out, have highlighted Fallout as a standout entry in the action and spy genres. (Note: Attributed to multiple references:) (Note: Attributed to multiple references:)

In 2025, it was one of the films voted for the "Readers' Choice" edition of The New York Times' list of "The 100 Best Movies of the 21st Century," finishing at number 172.

In 2026, IndieWire ranked it number 16 on its list of "Top 100 Best Movie Sequels of All Time".

=== Cultural influence ===
A scene of Cavill pumping or "reloading" his biceps in preparation during the bathroom fight with the decoy Lark became an Internet meme. (Note: Attributed to multiple references:) Cavill improvised the motion to warm up his muscles due to soreness after three weeks of filming the scene. When no one remarked on the move, he thought it had looked out of place and did not repeat it until McQuarrie asked him to keep doing it. (Note: Attributed to multiple references:) In 2020, Fallout was among the action films director James Gunn recommended people watch during the COVID-19 pandemic. Cavill would again reference the "reloading" scene in a cameo appearance as a version of the Marvel Comics character Logan / Wolverine in the Marvel Cinematic Universe (MCU) film Deadpool & Wolverine (2024).

== Sequels ==
Mission: Impossible – Fallout was followed by Mission: Impossible – Dead Reckoning Part One (2023). It features many of the same cast and crew including Cruise, Rhames, Pegg, Ferguson, and Kirby reprising their roles, as well as McQuarrie as director and writer. Dead Reckoning Part One also introduces Hayley Atwell as an ally to Ethan, and Esai Morales as his old rival who is working for a rogue artificial intelligence known as The Entity. Another sequel, Mission: Impossible – The Final Reckoning, was released in 2025. Though further sequels are planned, Cruise has confirmed that The Final Reckoning would be his final portrayal of Ethan Hunt in the franchise.
