= Come Home to Me =

Come Home to Me may refer to:

- "Come Home to Me", 1990 song by Miki Howard from Miki Howard (album)
- "Come Home to Me", 1991 song from And Along Came Jones by George Jones
- Come Home to Me, 2014 novel of the Homefront series by Jessica Scott
- "Come Home to Me", 2015 song from Country Girl (Rebecca Hollweg album)
