= Easy Now =

Easy Now may refer to:

- Easy Now (album), a 2002 album by Jeb Loy Nichols
- "Easy Now" (song), a 1970 song by Eric Clapton
