= Orange Roses =

Studio album by Rebecca Hollweg
- Released: 10 March 2008
- Genre: singer-songwriter
- Length: 30:46
- Label: Emu Records
- Producer: Andy Hamill

Rebecca Hollweg chronology
June Babies (2001)	Orange Roses (2008)	Country Girl (2015)

Orange Roses, the second album by English singer-songwriter Rebecca Hollweg, was released on 10 March 2008 on Emu Records. Its songs have a country tinge. Produced in London by Andy Hamill and mixed by Brad Nunn of 4 Hero, it features the same musicians as on Rebecca Hollweg's debut album June Babies and a sleeve design by Jeb Loy Nichols.

== Reception ==
Reviewing the album for NetRhythms, Mike Davies described it as "an equally warm, mellow affair that colours the folk core with jazz, pop and country on more songs about childhood, the awakenings passing years bring, beginning and endings, and relationships".

Mick Houghton, in a four-starred review in the March issue of Uncut, described her as "akin to an old school Brill Building songsmith. Carole King couldn’t have come up with a better pop song than 'These Are My Tears'. If only the Carpenters were around to cover it – someone should."

Andy Cole, writing in Maverick music magazine, said: "Rebecca writes deceptively about the everyday things of life... Orange Roses... is personally my contender for song of the year. It’s about wiping away the sadness and embracing new beginnings... These Are My Tears with its smooth electric guitar is something you could imagine the late Karen Carpenter wrapping her voice around this near perfect pop song...highly listenable from beginning to end which has you reaching for the replay button for more chill-out joy. Music of the highest quality."

Rebecca Hollweg performed "Love Me Back" live on Janice Long's BBC Radio 2 show.

== Track listing ==
1. "Love Me Back" (3:09)
2. "Orange Roses" (4:37)
3. "These Are My Tears" (3:11)
4. "Worse Things Happen At Sea" (3:16)
5. "Millennium Mailshot" (1:22)
6. "Somerset" (4:07)
7. "Mushroom Song" (4:08)
8. "Rocked By Your Love" (3:40)
9. "Falling" (2:38)

Running time: 30:46

== Personnel ==
- Rebecca Hollweg – vocals, acoustic guitar
- Andy Hamill – bass, chromatic harmonica
- Tom Gordon – drums, percussion
- Mike Outram – guitars
- Phil Peskett – piano
- Julian Ferraretto – violin, viola, string arrangements
