= Strange Faith and Practice =

Studio album by Jeb Loy Nichols
- Released: 2009
- Genre: Pop/Rock
- Length: 48:57
- Label: Impossible Ark Records
- Producer: Benedic Lamdin, Riaan Vosloo

Jeb Loy Nichols chronology
Parish Bar (2009)	Strange Faith and Practice (2009)	Only Time Will Tell (2010)

Strange Faith and Practice is the seventh album by American-born singer/songwriter Jeb Loy Nichols, released in 2009 on Impossible Ark Records.

== Track listing ==
1. "Sometime Somewhere Somebody" - 2:59
2. "Lake Whitfield" - 4:14
3. "The Day That Never Came" - 4:10
4. "Can't Stay Here" - 4:39
5. "This Morning" - 3:10
6. "Probably Never Stop" - 3:05
7. "Interlude One" - 2:03
8. "Strange Faith and Practice" - 4:36
9. "If I Can Come Home to You" - 4:41
10. "Interlude Two" - 3:15
11. "Cruel Winter" - 2:39
12. "Home Wasn't Built in a Day" - 5:43
13. "Next Time" - 3:43

== Reception ==
Professional ratings
Review scores
Source	Rating
Allmusic	4.5/5 stars

Nichols' seventh release received positive reviews. Allmusic said "this is the most organic-sounding record Nichols has ever made -- and that's saying something, because all of his previous offerings have been warm and intimate.' The Independent said "this foray into drifting, downtempo jazz is a wonderful and surprising departure, the 13-song sequence of Strange Faith & Practice deepening as it goes."
