= Mike Prestwood Smith =

Sound engineer

- Occupation: Sound engineer
- Years active: 1996-present

Mike Prestwood Smith is a sound engineer. Smith and his fellow sound engineers are nominated for an Academy Award for Best Sound Mixing for the 2013 film Captain Phillips. He was also nominated for a British Academy Film Award in the category Best Sound for the film Mission: Impossible – Fallout. His nomination was shared with Gilbert Lake, James Mather and Chris Munro.

He has worked on over 100 films since 1996.
