= Only Time Will Tell (Ian Gomm and Jeb Loy Nichols album) =

Studio album by Ian Gomm and Jeb Loy Nichols
- Released: 2010
- Genre: Pop/Rock
- Length: 52:40
- Label: Relaxa Records International
- Producer: Jeb Loy Nichols, Ian Gomm

Ian Gomm and Jeb Loy Nichols chronology
Strange Faith and Practice (2009)	Only Time Will Tell (2010)	The Jeb Loy Nichols Special (2012)

Only Time Will Tell is a collaborative record by Ian Gomm and Jeb Loy Nichols, released in 2010 on the Relaxa Records International record label.

== Track listing ==
1. "Take This Hurt Off Me" - 2:59
2. "Hold On To A Dream" - 4:14
3. "I'll Take Good Care Of You" - 4:10
4. "Snakes and Ladders" - 4:39
5. "Surprise Surprise" - 3:10
6. "Mister Moon" - 3:05
7. "Quiet Life" - 2:03
8. "Hooked On Love" - 4:36
9. "You Must Believe Me" - 4:41
10. "Lovers Walk" - 3:15
11. "Years From Now" - 2:39
12. "Go Through Sunday" - 5:43
13. "No-One Love You Like I Do" - 3:43
14. "I Can't Write Another Song" - 3:43

== Reception ==
Professional ratings
Review scores
Source	Rating
Allmusic	4.0/5 stars
