= Parish Bar =

Studio album by Jeb Loy Nichols
- Released: 2009
- Genre: Pop rock
- Length: 39:44
- Label: Tuition Records (UK); Compass Records (US)
- Producer: Jeb Loy Nichols

Jeb Loy Nichols chronology
Days Are Mighty (2007)	Parish Bar (2009)	Strange Faith and Practice (2009)

Parish Bar is the sixth studio album by American singer/songwriter Jeb Loy Nichols, released in 2009 on the Tuition record label in the UK and the Compass record label in the US. The album is made of songs recorded in-between other projects.

== Track listing ==
1. "Countrymusicdisco45" - 4:12
2. "Whole Thing Going On" - 2:55
3. "Just a Country Boy" - 2:16
4. "I'm Blue I'm Lonesome Too" - 2:38
5. "Days Are Mighty" - 2:46
6. "Too Much Not Enough" - 2:14
7. "Satan's Helper" - 2:52
8. "Foggy Road Ride" - 2:59
9. "My Kind" - 3:31
10. "Neath the Cold Ground" - 3:35
11. "So Sad" - 3:14
12. "Dr. Noblio" - 4:02
13. "I Took a Memory to Lunch" - 3:30

== Reception ==
Professional ratings
Review scores
Source	Rating
Allmusic	4/5 stars

Nichols' sixth release received positive reviews. Allmusic said "Parish Bar may be the album that puts Nichols over, and it deserves to. He's slowly but surely gone about his business, and his sense of craft, honesty, and curiosity makes for music that is rich, sophisticated, and resonant with all the qualities of the human spirit." NPR's Fresh Air said "this new collection, which Nichols says he recorded over the past couple years — mostly at home in his spare time between other projects — is his most inviting album yet. It seems both offhand and sincerely curious in its musical explorations." Crawdaddy! said "Nichols delivers his tales in a Boz Scaggs-meets-J.J. Cale tone that’s slyly jazzy and sincerely country, a kicked-back style that complements the languid grooves he creates for his music."
