= Gilbert Lake (sound engineer) =

British sound engineer

- Occupation: Sound engineer

Gilbert Lake is a British sound engineer. He was nominated for a British Academy Film Award in the category Best Sound for the film Mission: Impossible – Fallout. He was also nominated for three Cinema Audio Society Awards for the films District 9, Wonder Woman and A Shaun the Sheep Movie: Farmageddon.

== Selected filmography ==
- Mission: Impossible – Fallout (2018; co-nominated with James Mather, Chris Munro and Mike Prestwood Smith)
