= Alexander Hollweg =

British painter and sculptor (1936–2020)

- Born: Alexander von Bethmann-Hollweg; 26 December 1936; Kensington, London
- Died: 20 January 2020 (aged 83); Nettlecombe, West Somerset
- Resting place: Nettlecombe, West Somerset
- Education: Camberwell School of Art
- Known for: Sculpture; murals; paintings
- Spouse: Geraldine James
- Children: Rebecca Hollweg + Lucas Hollweg

Alexander Hollweg (26 December 1936 – 20 January 2020) was a British painter and sculptor.

== Early life and education ==
Hollweg was born in Kensington, London, one of two sons of British novelist and author Barbara Wadsworth (daughter of the painter Edward Wadsworth and violinist Fanny Eveleigh) and the German Olympic ice-hockey player Joachim Albrecht von Bethmann-Hollweg, who came to England from Germany in 1934.

He went to Ashdown House, followed by Charterhouse School, and then studied French and German at New College, Oxford.

== Family heritage ==
His family name and that of his wife and children remains officially von Bethmann-Hollweg, and some of his work is signed thus. He was the second cousin once removed of Theobald von Bethmann Hollweg who was, until 1917, Chancellor of Germany under Kaiser Wilhelm II. He was the grandson of British modernist painter Edward Wadsworth, famous for his work on the Dazzle ships during the First World War, and Alex and his mother and brother lived with him and his violinist wife Fanny Wadsworth during the Second World War in Buxton, Derbyshire ).

== Professional career ==
After university Hollweg studied painting at Camberwell School of Art, from 1960 to 1963. He exhibited in the UK, including one-man shows at the Whitechapel Gallery in 1971, the Redfern Gallery, the Felicity Samuel Gallery (1972–77), the Marina Henderson Gallery and the Gordon Samuel Gallery. He exhibited regularly in the 1970s and 1980s in New York (the Kornblee Gallery) and in northern Italy, in Venice (the Gabriella Cardazzo Gallery) and Vicenza (the Tino Ghelfi Gallery). He drew and painted at the National Theatre in London. A retrospective, "Alexander Hollweg: Journeys in Art" opened at the Museum of Somerset, Taunton, in November 2023.

He taught at Maidstone College of Art and Bristol Polytechnic.

Hollweg's work in public collections includes "Country Dance", a woodcut (printed by Lizzie Cox) in the Tate's collection, part of a portfolio of prints commissioned by Bernard Jacobsen Gallery to celebrate the bicentenary of John Constable, alongside other contemporary artists including David Hockney. There are several works by Hollweg in hospitals in his adopted home county of Somerset, and in the Royal Brompton Hospital and Harefield Hospital in Chelsea, London. Three of his paintings are held at the Ystrad Mynach campus of Coleg y Cymoedd in Wales.

He continued to produce commissions for private patrons and to sell from his studio in Somerset. In 2000 and 2004 he produced two large-scale murals for the Charlotte Street Hotel and the Soho Hotel in central London. These were commissioned by Kit and Tim Kemp of Firmdale Hotels.

The Museum of Somerset staged a retrospective exhibition of his life and work from 14 November 2023 to 9 March 2024. It was curated by Sarah Cox of the museum who also wrote the catalogue essay, alongside Denys Wilcox of The Court Gallery. Margaret Drabble wrote the foreword to the catalogue. Films of the exhibition are on YouTube, and articles appeared in the TLS, House & Garden and Somerset Life magazine.

Hollweg was also a semi-professional musician, playing mostly guitar and ukulele and singing with a number of jazz bands in West Somerset, primarily his own band Dr Jazz. He also played E flat bass or tuba for more than 30 years with his local West Somerset Brass band in Watchet. In the final week of his retrospective exhibition, the brass band played a concert including his arrangements of French songs "Chantons en choeur – All together now", written for the French twinning visits. These are available as sheet music for other bands to play.

== Publications ==
- Brick Wall (1973), 10pp, Bernard Jacobson (picture book)

== Personal and family life ==
In 1962 he married Geraldine James, a silversmith and enameller, in her home town of Melbourne, Derbyshire. She trained as a painter at the Ruskin School of Drawing and Fine Art, Oxford and worked as a scene painter at the Royal Shakespeare Company.

Hollweg and his wife lived in Bedford Park, London. They had two children: Rebecca Hollweg (1964), a singer and songwriter, and a son. They all moved to rural West Somerset in 1973 and lived on the edge of Exmoor at Nettlecombe.

Alexander Hollweg died at home in Nettlecombe, West Somerset on 20 January 2020. He is buried in the graveyard there, in front of the farm and field depicted in his "Country Dance" print.
