= Days Are Mighty =

Studio album by Jeb Loy Nichols
- Released: 2007
- Genre: Pop/Rock
- Length: 33:24/23:40 (Disc 2)
- Label: Tuition Records (UK); Compass Records (US)
- Producer: Jeb Loy Nichols, Jonathan Lee, Andy Hamilton, Jennifer Carr

Jeb Loy Nichols chronology
Now Then (2005)	Days Are Mighty (2007)	Parish Bar (2009)

Days Are Mighty is the fifth album by American-born singer-songwriter Jeb Loy Nichols, released in 2007 on the Tuition record label in the UK and the Compass record label in the US. The US release also included a limited edition 2-CD set in which the second disc was a set of demos featuring Nichols singing and playing the acoustic guitar.

== Track listing ==
1. "My Kind" – 2:53
2. "Days Are Mighty" – 2:47
3. "Lay Down and Cry" – 3:11
4. "25 Years Too Late" – 3:17
5. "Can't Find the Words" – 2:16
6. "Poor Little Barn" – 2:58
7. "That's Not What She Said to Me" – 2:40
8. "After November" – 3:07
9. "Let's Not Fall" – 3:06
10. "Almost" – 2:55
11. "I Need You So" – 4:14

Disc 2 (available only on limited edition Compass Records release)

1. "I Need You So" – 2:19
2. "Let's Not Fall" – 2:47
3. "My Kind" – 2:20
4. "Days Are Mighty" – 2:14
5. "Can't Find the Words" – 2:22
6. "Lazy Afternoon" – 1:48
7. "Poor Little Barn" – 1:51
8. "Almost" – 2:16
9. "25 Years Too Late" – 2:56
10. "Still Tomorrow" – 2:47

== Reception ==
Professional ratings
Review scores
Source	Rating
Allmusic	4/5 stars

Nichols' fifth release received positive reviews. Allmusic said "this is the best recording he's issued yet. He has no gimmick, no schtick; his artful, unpretentious songwriting is accessible to virtually anyone, and is so precise in a musical sense that it is poetic and spacious without having to venture to reach very far." Twangville said "overall Jeb Loy Nichols has given us a group of songs on Days are Mighty that provide an impactful musical and emotional milieu."
