= The Jeb Loy Nichols Special =

Studio album by Jeb Loy Nichols
- Released: 2012
- Recorded: Dollis Hill, London
- Genre: Pop/Rock
- Length: 36:40
- Label: Decca Records
- Producer: Benedic Lamdin

Jeb Loy Nichols chronology
Only Time Will Tell (2010)	The Jeb Loy Nichols Special (2012)

The Jeb Loy Nichols Special is a record by Jeb Loy Nichols, released in 2012 on the Decca Records label. It was recorded in an analogue studio in Dollis Hill, London, with producer Benedic Lamdin and his Nostalgia 77, a band of jazz musicians.

== Track listing ==
1. "Intro" - 0:22
2. "Different Ways for Different Things" - 3:12
3. "Something About the Rain" - 3:05
4. "Nothing and No One" - 2:01
5. "Going Where the Lonely Go" - 2:53
6. "Ain't It Funny" - 2:15
7. "Countrymusicdisco45" - 4:08
8. "People Like Me" - 3:40
9. "Hard Times" - 2:39
10. "Disappointment" - 4:55
11. "Things Ain't What They Used to Be (And Probably Never Was)" - 2:11
12. "Waiting Round to Die" - 2:34
13. "The Quiet Life" - 2:45

== Cover versions ==
As well as original material, the album features a number of cover versions: "Things Ain’t What They Used To Be (And Probably Never Was)" by Larry Jon Wilson, "Going Where The Lonely Go" by Merle Haggard, "Ain’t It Funny" by George Jackson, "Waiting Round To Die" by Townes Van Zandt and "Hard Times" by Pablo Gad.

== Reception ==
Nichols' ninth release received positive reviews. The BBC said "it is an impressive vision' The New Zealand Herald said "Nichols brings just enough folk and blues to the mix, which means the (songs) are in very safe, smooth hands." Angus Cargill of Caught by the River said "The Jeb Loy Nichols Special is, above all, one of those great albums which, with a natural rhythm and pacing to it, just seems to make sense."
