= Country Girl (Rebecca Hollweg album) =

Studio album by Rebecca Hollweg
- Released: 9 February 2015 (UK)
- Genre: singer-songwriter
- Label: Emu Records
- Producer: Andy Hamill

Rebecca Hollweg chronology
Orange Roses (2008)	Country Girl (2015)	Other People's Songs (2020)

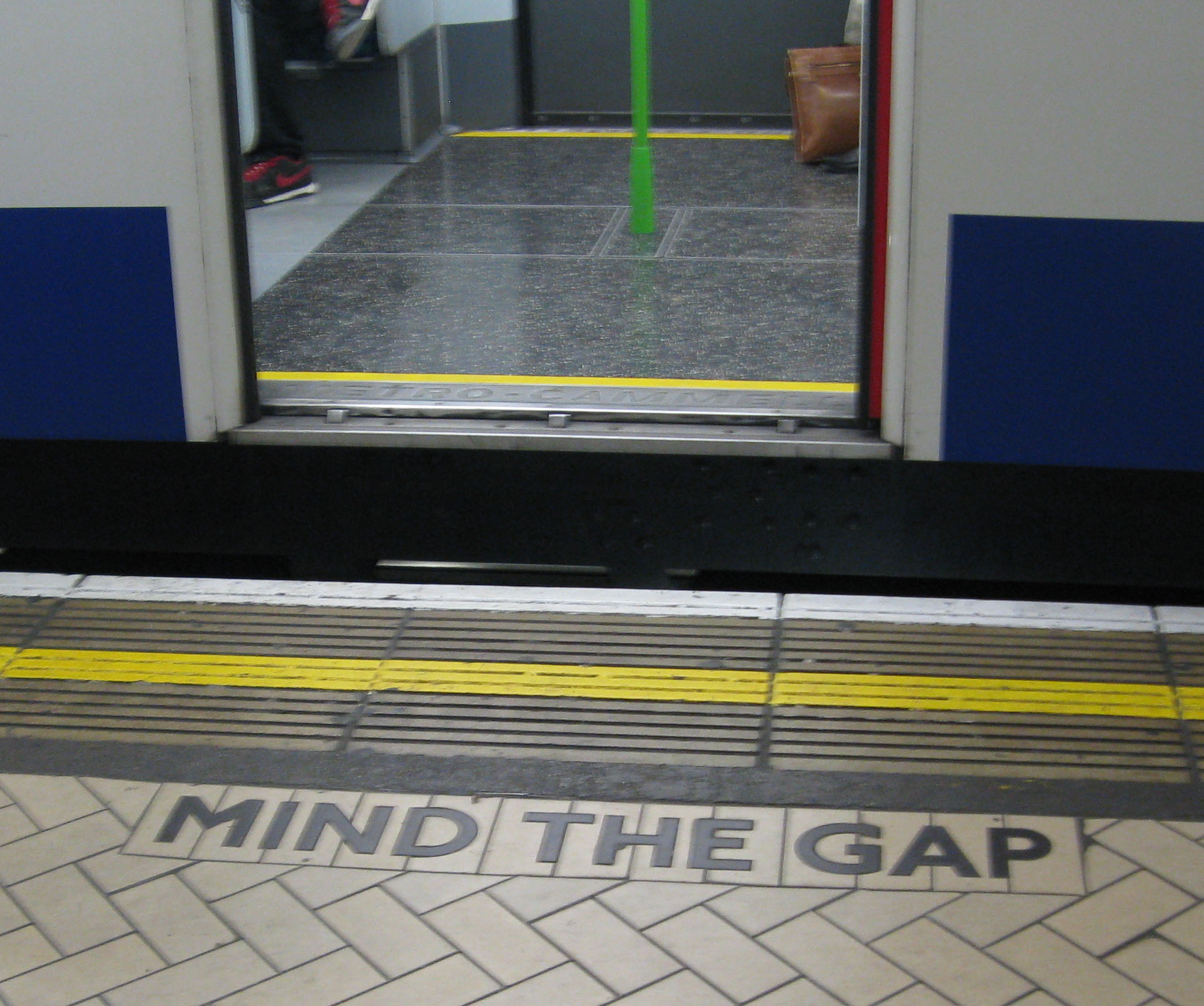
"Mind the gap" tile mosaic on the London Underground District line platform at London Victoria station

Country Girl, the third album by English singer-songwriter Rebecca Hollweg, was released on 9 February 2015 on Emu Records. The title track samples a recording of the "Mind the gap" announcement by Oswald Laurence which is used on the London Underground's Embankment station on the Northern line northbound platform to warn passengers when crossing the gap between the train and the platform.

== Production and launch ==
The album, which was produced and recorded by Andy Hamill at Emu's Nest Studios in London, was mixed by Andy Hamill and Chris Lewis and was mastered by Chris Lewis. It was launched at the Cavendish Arms in Stockwell, London on 23 November 2014.

== Reception ==
Reviewing Country Girl for Uncut magazine, Mick Houghton gave it 8 of 10, describing it as "another delightful batch of tunes" and adding: "The title track sets the tone, a jaunty, bass-driven, tongue-in-cheek look at city life, 'Ruby' is sung to her daughter and would have fitted snugly on any Carpenters’ album."

The title track was played on BBC Radio 2 by Janice Long and by Robert Elms on his BBC London 94.9 radio show. Jamie Cullum played the song "Light" on his BBC Radio 2 programme on 3 March 2015, saying "a great singer who I love very much... a real great listen from start to finish... this great, great album".

== Track listing ==
1. "Country Girl" (Rebecca Hollweg)
2. "Ruby" (Rebecca Hollweg)
3. "The Week" (Rebecca Hollweg)
4. "Come Home to Me" (Rebecca Hollweg)
5. "Camelia" (Rebecca Hollweg)
6. "Word" (Rebecca Hollweg)
7. "Light" (Rebecca Hollweg)
8. "Happy Here" (Rebecca Hollweg)
9. "Eden" (Rebecca Hollweg)
10. "Telescopic" (music by Chris Bowden, lyrics by Rebecca Hollweg)

== Personnel ==
- Rebecca Hollweg – vocals, acoustic guitar on "Light"
- Andy Hamill – double bass, bass guitar, harmonica, cello, glockenspiel, alto clarinet, flugelhorn, tuba, music boxes, backing vocals
- Ruby Hamill – backing vocals
- Julian Ferraretto – violin, viola, mandolin, musical saw
- Tom Gordon – drums, percussion
- Lucas Hollweg – trombone on "Happy Here"
- Mike Outram – electric and acoustic guitars, banjo
- Phil Peskett – piano

The strings were arranged by Julian Ferraretto and Andy Hamill

== Album cover ==
The CD cover was designed by Jeb Loy Nichols and incorporates photographs by Emily Bowling.
