= Charlotte Street Hotel =

Hotel in Fitzrovia, London

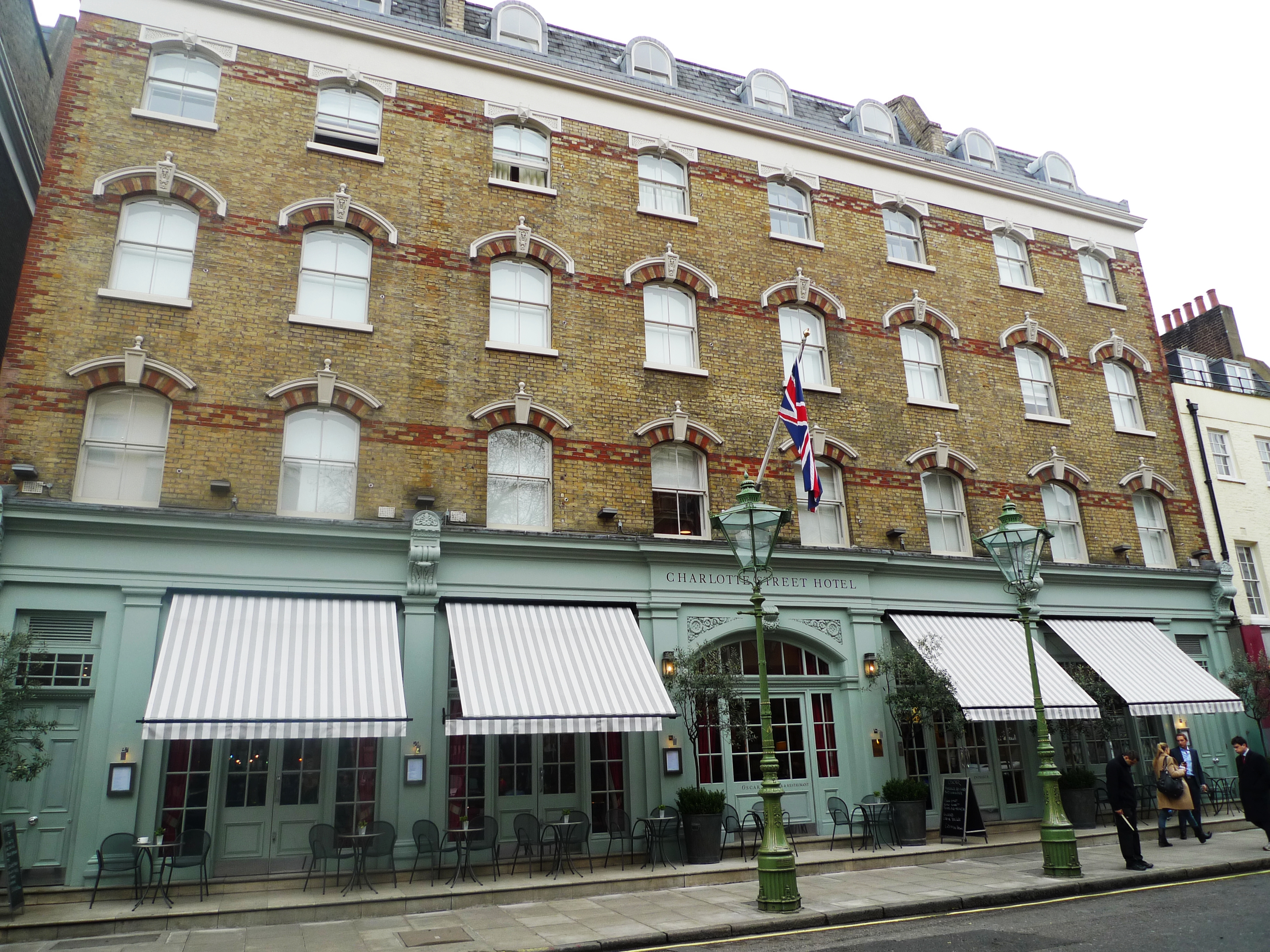

- Location within Central London

General information
- Location: 15 Charlotte Street, Fitzrovia, London, England, United Kingdom
- Coordinates: 51°31′5.99″N 0°8′6.04″W
- Opening: 5 June 2000

Other information
- Number of rooms: 52

Website
- http://www.firmdale.com/

Charlotte Street Hotel is a luxury 5-star hotel in London, England. It is located at 15 Charlotte Street in Fitzrovia. The hotel opened on 5 June 2000 and contains 52 rooms.

Charlotte Street Hotel is a modern boutique hotel furnished with 20th-century and contemporary art and a Botero sculpture. It features the work of British artists such as Roger Fry, Duncan Grant, Alexander Hollweg and Vanessa Bell. The hotel was designed by Kit Kemp, who purposefully wanted the design of the hotel to reflect vibrant contemporary London.

The hotel is served by the Oscar Restaurant and Bar serving British cuisine on the ground floor next to the hotel lobby. The bar opens out onto the local street during the summer months where most media professionals wind down.

On the ground floor are two open plan and spacious drawing rooms and a screening room with 67 Ferrari leather seats, showing films in the evening. The hotel also has two meeting rooms, a library and a fitness room on the lower ground floor.
