= World Update =

- Genre: News, current events, and factual
- Running time: 54 minutes
- Country of origin: United Kingdom
- Language: English
- Home station: BBC World Service
- Hosted by: Dan Damon
- Edited by: Ian Brimacombe
- Recording studio: Broadcasting House
- Original release: 2020

World Update is a radio programme that was BBC World Service's morning news strand. Broadcast at 10:06 GMT, it was also carried by public radio stations across the United States. Between 2003 and 2020, the programme was presented by Dan Damon. On 25 June 2012, World Update became the first English-language World Service programme to come from Broadcasting House.

In January 2020, the BBC announced that it would be discontinuing World Update.

== Presenters ==
=== Current ===
Years	Presenter	Current role
2003–2020	Dan Damon	Main presenter
?–2020	Julian Marshall	Occasional relief presenter
?–2020	Rebecca Kesby	Occasional relief presenter

=== Former ===
- American journalist Vicki Barker was the main presenter from 1997 to 2003.

== See also ==
- BBC News
- BBC World News, The BBC's International Television Station
