= Just What Time It Is =

Studio album by Jeb Loy Nichols
- Released: December 20, 2000
- Genre: Pop/Rock
- Length: 50:35
- Label: Rough Trade
- Producer: Jeb Loy Nichols, Wayne Nunes, Ewan Pearson

Jeb Loy Nichols chronology
Lovers Knot (1997)	Just What Time It Is (2000)	Easy Now (2002)

Just What Time It Is is the second album by American-born singer/songwriter Jeb Loy Nichols, released in 2000 on the Rough Trade record label.

== Track listing ==
All songs written by Jeb Loy Nichols except as indicated.

1. "Heaven Right Here" – 3:38
2. "Perfect Stranger" – 4:16
3. "Hold Me Till I Fall" (Nichols, Wayne Nunes) – 3"23
4. "Kissing Gate" (Nichols, Nunes) – 3:32
5. "Say Goodbye to Christopher" (Nichols, Ewan Pearson) – 4:01
6. "Room 522" (Nichols, Nunes) – 3:38
7. "She Reminded Me" – 2:57
8. "Midnight (All Night Long)" – 3:55
9. "Summer Came" – 4:17
10. "Trying to Get Over" (Nichols, Nunes) – 3:48
11. "Sadly Sometimes" (Nichols, Lorraine Morley) – 4:12
12. "Double Dose of You" – 3:18
13. "Heavy Changes" – 5:40

== Reception ==
Professional ratings
Review scores
Source	Rating
Allmusic	3/5 stars
Chicago Tribune	(favorable)
Robert Christgau	(2-star Honorable Mention)
Cincinnati CityBeat	(favorable)
Entertainment Weekly	B
The Guardian	4/5 stars
Spin	8/10

Nichols' second release received good reviews. Allmusic.com said "He has soul oozing out of every pore." They add "And on top of it all, the songs are great." KEXP.org, the radio station of the Experience Music Project said "Deceptively light, it gets deeper with every listen."
