= Easy Now (album) =

Studio album by Jeb Loy Nichols
- Released: 2002
- Genre: Pop/Rock
- Length: 43:55
- Label: Rykodisc
- Producer: Jeb Loy Nichols, Wayne Nunes, Ewan Pearson

Jeb Loy Nichols chronology
Just What Time It Is (2000)	Easy Now (2002)	Now Then (2005)

Easy Now is the third album by American-born singer/songwriter Jeb Loy Nichols, released in 2002 on the Rykodisc record label.

== Track listing ==
1. "Letter to an Angel" – 2:28
2. "Better Than Beautiful" – 2:56
3. "They Don't Know" – 3:44
4. "Wild Honeycomb'" – 3:45
5. "A Little Love" – 3:34
6. "Heaven Help Me" – 3:26
7. "Mostly Bittersweet" – 3:19
8. "Sure Felt Good to Me" – 3:44
9. "Wanna Walk (A Little Bit)" – 0:47
10. "The Other Side" – 4:41
11. "Hold Me Strong" – 3:08
12. "Not the Only Man" – 3:59
13. "Never Coming Back" – 4:24

== Reception ==
Professional ratings
Review scores
Source	Rating
Allmusic	3/5 stars

Nichols' third release received mostly positive reviews. Allmusic.com said "The album is bookended by the two best songs he's written: "Letter to an Angel" and "Never Coming Back. Popmatters.com described it as "another inspiring touchstone on what looks like a long and promising future."
