= Kit Kemp =

British decorator (born 1950)

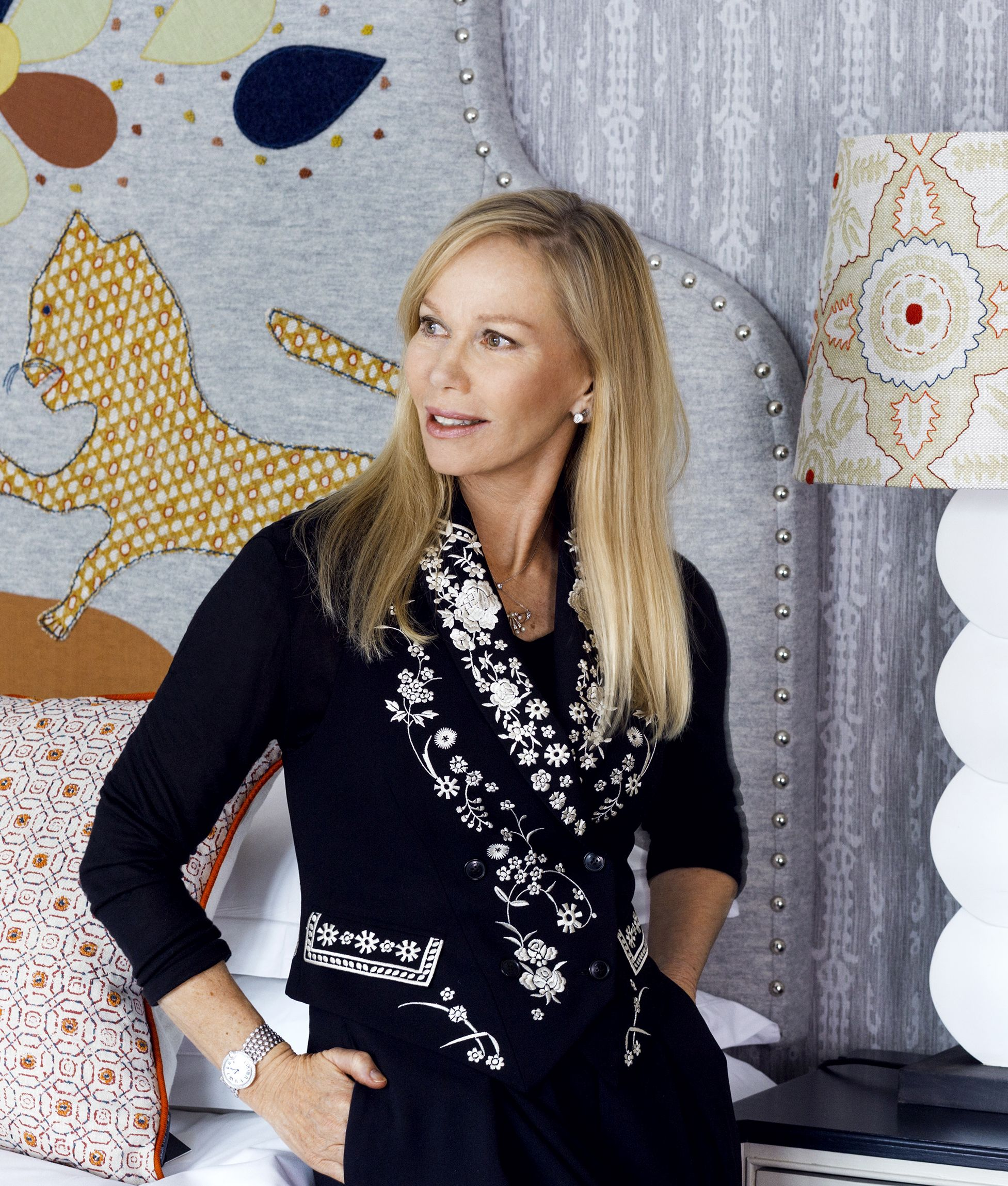
- Born: Judith Kit Kemp; 1950 (age 75–76); Southampton, England
- Occupation: Interior designer
- Spouse: Tim Kemp
- Website: www.kitkemp.com

Judith Kit Kemp MBE (born 1950), is a British interior designer, and founder of Firmdale Hotels, a chain of eleven hotels in London and New York. She is married to Tim Kemp. They were jointly awarded an MBE in 2012, for services to the hotel industry and charity.

== Career ==
Kemp commenced working for an auctioneer, and then for Polish architect Leszek Nowicki. She met her husband Tim Kemp through the architectural practice in the 1980s, and together they started to develop boutique hotels.

Kemp's first establishment was Dorset Square Hotel in 1985. Firmdale has 11 properties, with eight hotels in London including Ham Yard Hotel, the Soho Hotel, Covent Garden Hotel, Charlotte Street Hotel, Haymarket Hotel, Number Sixteen Hotel and Knightsbridge Hotel, and three in New York, The Whitby Hotel, Crosby Street Hotel and Warren Street Hotel.

Kit Kemp and her husband Tim Kemp have converted properties such as warehouses and car parks into hotels. In 2007, they were awarded the Crown Estate's Urban Business Award for the regeneration of Haymarket Hotel. They have received press coverage for the Soho Hotel and Ham Yard Hotel in London, as well as Crosby Street Hotel and The Whitby Hotel in New York.

She has won awards for her work including House & Garden's Hotel Designer of the Year, Andrew Martin International Interior Designer of the Year and Conde Nast Traveller’s Best Hotel in the World for Design.

Kemp has collaborated with brands including Wedgwood, Wilton Carpets, Andrew Martin International, Anthropologie, Christopher Farr, Chelsea Textiles, C P Hart, Porta Romana and Fine Cell Work.

== Publications ==
In 2012, Kemp published her first book, A Living Space. This was followed by Every Room Tells A Story which was published in 2015. Her third book, Design Thread, was published in February 2019. Kemp has been a guest editor for Homes & Gardens (UK) and Hospitality Design (US).

She is a trustee of Fine Cell Work and the Heritage of London Trust.

== Personal life ==
Kemp has three daughters, Tiffany, Willow, and Araminta (Minnie). Willow and Minnie both work with Kemp.
