= Dan Damon =

- Occupation(s): Journalist, presenter
- Notable credit: World Update

Dan Damon is a BBC journalist and radio broadcaster who presented World Update for the BBC World Service.

== Early career ==
Damon joined the BBC in 1974 as a technical operator for radio news. His move into journalism took place in 1982 with a nightly phone in on LBC. Damon, with his wife Sian, spent seven years filming the downfall of the Soviet Union throughout Eastern Europe. He then returned to the BBC to work as a presenter and reporter for BBC World Service and BBC Radio 4. During this time he was a regular presenter of PM.

== World Update ==
In 2003 Damon became the main presenter of World Update on the BBC World Service. He presented the programme on weekdays at 1000 UK Time. He presented the programme from locations around the world.

The BBC ended the World Update programme in early 2020. Dan Damon was not heard on BBC since.

There was a segment in May 2020 on the BBC World News programme “Over to You”, where listeners worldwide stated their praise for World Update and their wish for the program to continue. “Over to You” is an opportunity to “Talk back to the BBC and challenge the programme makers.” with presenter Rajan Datar.
