= Joachim von Bethmann-Hollweg =

Prussian-born German ice hockey player

- Born: 16 December 1911 Neldenmühle, Prussia, German Empire
- Died: 13 August 2001 (aged 89) Royal Tunbridge Wells, England, UK
- Position: Defence
- Shot: Right
- Played for: SC Riessersee
- National team: Germany
- Playing career: 1929–1936

Joachim Albrecht von Bethmann-Hollweg (16 December 1911 – 13 August 2001) was a German ice hockey player who competed for the German national team at the 1936 Winter Olympics in Garmisch-Partenkirchen and played club hockey for SC Riessersee. he was also a businessman and an amateur jazz piano player.

In 1934, he married the British novelist and author Barbara Wadsworth (daughter of the painter Edward Wadsworth and violinist Fanny Eveleigh) in Munich, where his wife-to-be had come from England to learn German. Later that year, he moved from Germany to live in the United Kingdom.

Von Bethmann-Hollweg trained in marketing for Unilever at Port Sunlight but was then interned at the outbreak of the Second World War in Douglas, Isle of Man for the whole duration of the war, due to his German ice hockey career and his German political relatives. A family connection giving him a good character reference eventually enabled him to leave the Isle of Man and spend the last year of the war working as a woodsman at the Chatsworth Estate in Derbyshire. He had grown up on similar estates belonging to his aristocratic family, at Runowo in Prussia (now in Poland) and then at Rheineck, near Koblenz in Germany. Rheineck was built by his ancestor, the lawyer Moritz August von Bethmann-Hollweg.

With his wife, he went back to live in Germany in the 1960s, at his cousin’s estate at Jersbek in Schleswig Holstein and founded a successful business there called "Schatzinsel" (Treasure Island), exporting English antiques to Germany. They returned to live in England in the 1990s, to Earl's Court, London.

Von Bethmann-Hollweg was inducted into the German Ice Hockey Hall of Fame in 1988. He was inducted into the Spengler Cup Ice Hockey Hall of Fame in Davos, Switzerland, on 29 December 2024, as an exceptional international ice hockey player of his generation who took part in that championship in the 1930s.

He and his wife had two sons – Dietrich (later Derek) von Bethmann-Hollweg (1934—2023), an actor and former international personnel manager for Shell; and Alexander Hollweg (1936–2000), the painter and sculptor.

He was the grandfather of singer-songwriter Rebecca Hollweg and Lucas Hollweg, cook and food writer for The Sunday Times and Waitrose Magazine, and author of Good things to eat (Harper Collins).
