= Lovers Knot (album) =

Studio album by Jeb Loy Nichols
- Released: 1997
- Genre: Pop, rock
- Length: 38:08
- Label: Capitol
- Producer: Craig Street

Jeb Loy Nichols chronology
| Lovers Knot (1997) | Just What Time It Is (2000) |

Professional ratings
Review scores
| Source | Rating |
|---|---|
| AllMusic | 4/5 stars |
| Robert Christgau | A− |

Lovers Knot is an album by the American-born singer/songwriter Jeb Loy Nichols, released in 1997. It was his first album released under his own name. It features artists such as Doug Wimbish, John Medeski of Medeski Martin & Wood, Curtis Fowlkes and Roy Nathanson of The Jazz Passengers, the Holmes Brothers, and Joe Higgs.

== Reception ==
The album received strong critical reviews. AllMusic wrote that Nichols fit the pieces of rhythm and blues and country and western together in a new and fresh way. KEXP.org, the radio station of the Experience Music Project, said: "Nichols and his sweetly soulful songs are the deserved focus here, and this rich, subtle gem is one of the year's best albums." The Memphis Flyer called it "an earthy, organic album that belied [Nichols's] roots in alt-country music while revealing his adventurous spirit."

The record sold poorly. Nichols was dropped from the label and the album was withdrawn after only a short release in North America.

== Track listing ==
1. "As The Rain" – 4:55
2. "Our Good Thing (Just Gets Better)" – 3:08
3. "Coming Down Again" – 3:08
4. "Dark Hollow'" – 3:37
5. "Something We Had" – 3:52
6. "Yesterday's a Long Time Ago" – 4:34
7. "Quickly into Trouble" – 3:47
8. "Wipe Away a Million Tears" – 3:24
9. "Sugar Creek" – 4:28
10. "Ill Angel" – 3:15
