= Soho Hotel =

Hotel in London, England

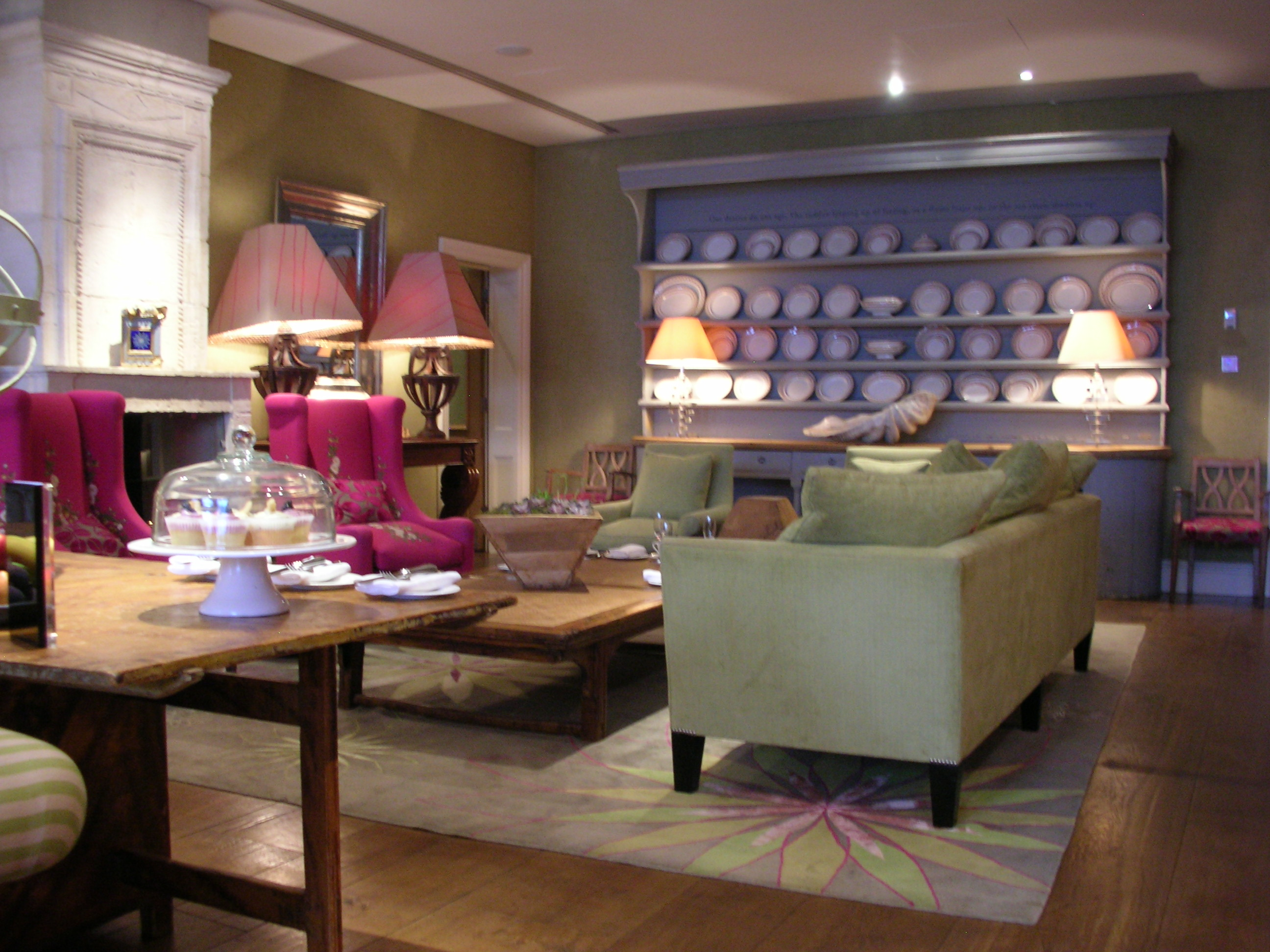
- Soho Hotel library room.

- Location within Central London
- Hotel chain: Firmdale Hotels

General information
- Location: 4 Richmond Mews, Soho, London, England, United Kingdom
- Coordinates: 51°31′02″N 0°7′04″W

Other information
- Number of rooms: 96

Website
- www.firmdalehotels.com/hotels/london/the-soho-hotel/

The Soho Hotel is a luxury 5-star hotel in London, England. Located at 4 Richmond Mews in Soho, the hotel has 96 bedrooms and suites, each one individually designed by Firmdale Hotels’ co-owner and Creative Director, Kit Kemp. The hotel's Refuel Restaurant & Bar serves breakfast, brunch, lunch, afternoon tea and dinner a la carte. The restaurant also has a covered and heated outdoor dining area on the hotel's forecourt. The Soho Hotel has two screen rooms and three private event rooms; the Crimson Bar and Indigo and Sandra Blow Rooms.
