= Jeb Loy Nichols =

American singer-songwriter

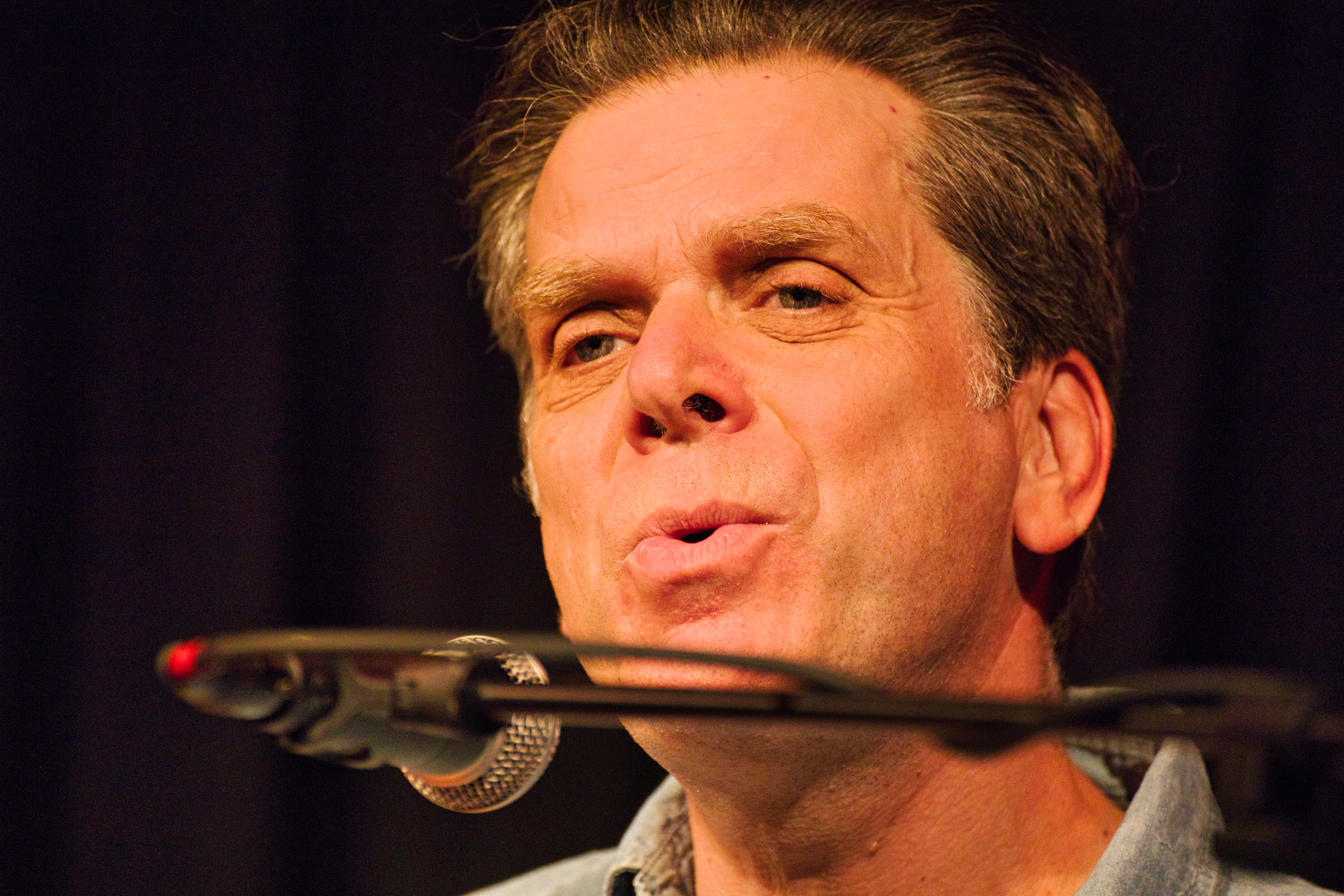
Jeb Loy Nichols, 2022

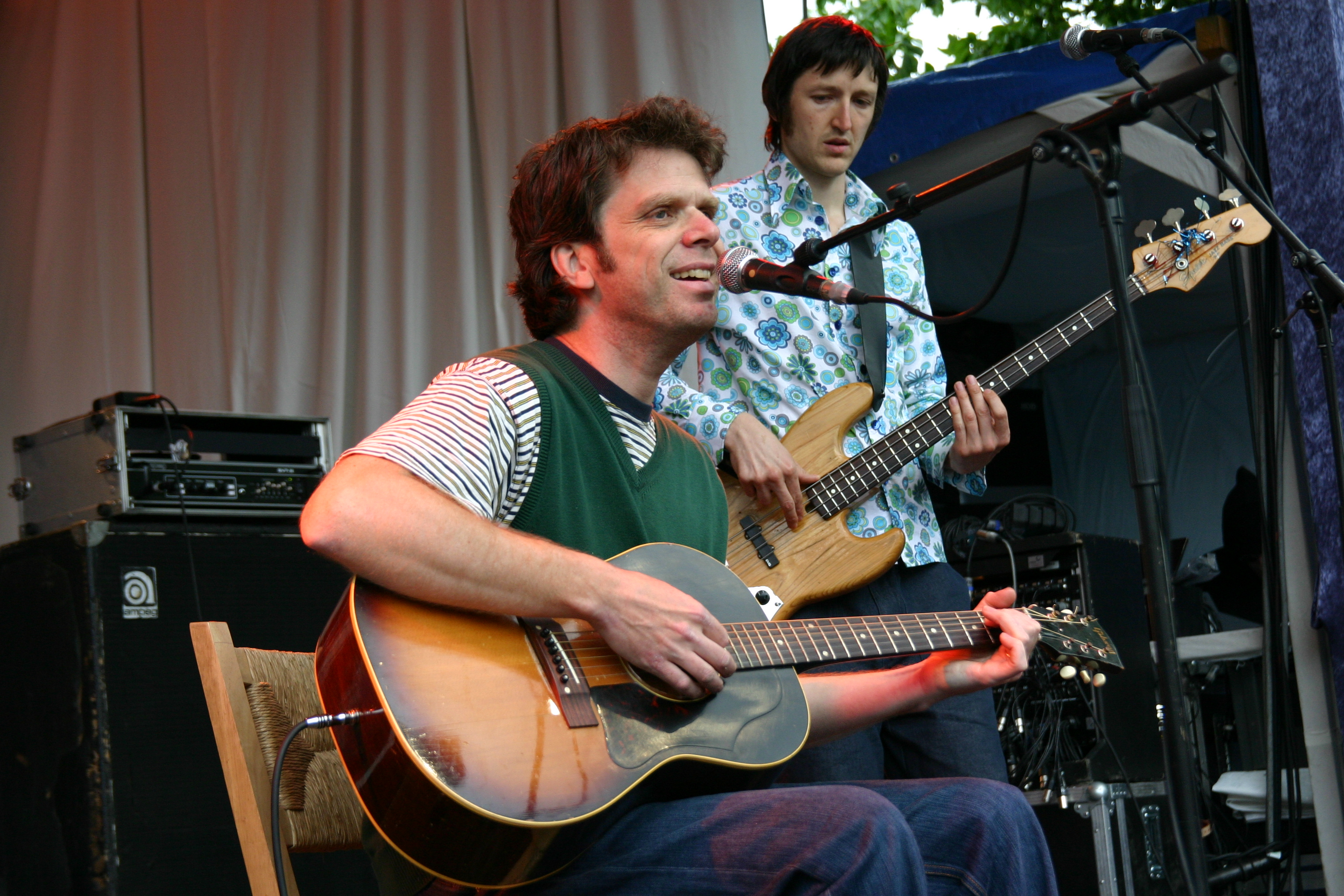
Jeb Loy Nichols, 2006

Jeb Loy Nichols is an American-born singer, songwriter, and musician, who is based in Wales. His music combines elements of soul, country, folk, reggae and blues.

== Biography ==
Jeb Loy Nichols was born in Lander, Wyoming. He has lived in Missouri, Texas and New York City before moving to London in 1981.

In 1990, he formed The Fellow Travellers with his wife, the vocalist Loraine Morley. That year, they released the album No Easy Way on the independent Ohio-based OKra record label, followed by Just a Visitor in 1992, Things and Time in 1993, Love Shines Brighter in 1993 and A Few Good Dubs in 1995. In 1994–95, Morley released the album A Face Drawn in Sand (OKra/NORMAL Rec) with mandolin, harmonica and occasional backing-vocals courtesy of Nichols.

In 1997, Nichols released his first album under his own name, Lovers Knot on Capitol Records. Positive critical reviews could not overcome poor sales and he was dropped from the label. He then released Just What Time It Is on the Rough Trade in 2000, the same year he moved from London to mid-Wales. Rykodisc released Easy Now in 2002. 2005's Now Then on the Tuition label marked the fourth record label in a row. Tuition then released his 2007 release Days Are Mighty. Parish Bar was released in 2009 on Tuition in the UK, and Compass in the US. Strange Faith and Practice was released in 2009 on the Impossible Ark record label.

== Collaborations ==
Nichols's voice is heard on the Groove Armada song "What's Your Version" on their Soundboy Rock album.

Nichols released the 2010 album Only Time Will Tell with British singer/songwriter Ian Gomm on the Relaxa Records label. They recorded fourteen new tracks together at Gwyn Jones's Bos Studio in Llanerfyl, mid Wales. Nashville musicians Clive Gregson and Pat McInerney contributed to the recording between UK touring commitments. It was mixed at The Butcher Shoppe, Nashville, Tennessee, US by David Ferguson and mastered at Foxwood Mastering, Nashville, Tennessee, by Dave Shipley.

Nichols was part of the 1993 'OKra All-Stars' project, which brought together members of four OKra records artists to form an alt-Country Supergroup. Nichols worked with Ricky Barnes (Ricky Barnes & the Hootowls), Dave Schramm (the Schramms, Yo La Tengo), and Hank McCoy (Hank McCoy and the Dead Ringers) on the group's only recording, contributing four original songs and singing on all the tracks. The band performed live in the United States only once, at Stache's in Columbus Ohio (OKra Records' home base). They embarked on a successful tour of Germany and Austria in January 2024.

== Discography ==
- OKra All-Stars (1993)
- Lovers Knot (1997)
- Just What Time It Is (2000)
- Easy Now (2002)
- Now Then (2005)
- Days Are Mighty (2007)
- Parish Bar (2009)
- Strange Faith and Practice (2009)
- Only Time Will Tell (2010) (with Ian Gomm)
- The Jeb Loy Nichols Special (2012)
- Long Time Traveller (2016)
- Country Hustle (2017)
- June Is Short, July Is Long (2019)
- Season of Decline (2020)
- Jeb Loy (2021)
- The United States of the Broken Hearted (2022)
- Nichols & Phillips: Three Fools (2023)
- Shadow on the Day (2024)

== Publications ==
- (with Rebecca Hollweg): The Ball That Got Stuck in the Tree, Emu Records, 2010. ISBN 978-0956592606
