= Jack Reacher (soundtrack) =

Jack Reacher: Music from the Motion Picture

Film score by Joe Kraemer
- Released: December 18, 2012
- Studios: Sony Scoring Stage, Culver City, California
- Genre: Film score
- Length: 56:25
- Labels: La-La Land Records; Paramount Music
- Producer: Joe Kraemer

Joe Kraemer chronology
Confession of a Gangster (2010)	Jack Reacher (2012)	Favor (2013)

Jack Reacher: Music from the Motion Picture is the soundtrack accompanying the Christopher McQuarrie-directed 2012 film of the same name starring Tom Cruise, and features an original score composed by Joe Kraemer. Kraemer, who previously scored McQuarrie's directorial debut The Way of the Gun (2000), was hired to score the film in July 2012. The score was performed by the Hollywood Studio Symphony and recorded at the Sony Scoring Stage in Culver City, California. A soundtrack album for the film was released on December 18, 2012, by La-La Land Records in CDs, while the digital distribution was handled by Paramount Music.

== Development ==
Kraemer was announced as the composer for the film in July 2012, having already started work on it. After spending eight weeks working with McQuarrie on materials to present to producers, Kraemer's hiring was approved and he directly began working on the film's opening eight minutes.

The film is noted for its balance between music and silence, with music primarily absent or reserved during a majority of the film's action sequences.

== Track listing ==
No.	Title	Artist(s)	Length
1.	"Main Title"	Joe Kraemer	3:50
2.	"Who Is Jack Reacher?"	Joe Kraemer	3:12
3.	"The Investigation"	Joe Kraemer	3:20
4.	"Barr and Helen"	Joe Kraemer	4:38
5.	"Farrier and the Zec"	Joe Kraemer	4:37
6.	"The Riverwalk"	Joe Kraemer	4:04
7.	"Helen's Story"	Joe Kraemer	3:12
8.	"Evidence"	Joe Kraemer	8:31
9.	"Helen in Jeopardy"	Joe Kraemer	4:58
10.	"The Quarry Sequence"	Joe Kraemer	3:57
11.	"Showdown"	Joe Kraemer	4:36
12.	"Finale & End Credits"	Joe Kraemer	7:30
Total length:			56:25

CD bonus track
No.	Title	Artist(s)	Length
13.	"Prisoner Human Being"	Joe Kraemer	4:37
Total length:			61:02

iTunes bonus track
No.	Title	Artist(s)	Length
13.	"Suite from Jack Reacher"	Joe Kraemer	6:48
Total length:			63:13

== Reception ==
Music critic Jonathan Broxton of Movie Music UK wrote: "Although Jack Reacher is not a flashy score that will garner legions of fans, the score does what it does very well, and that blockbuster main theme will be a favorite of many." James Southall of Movie Wave commented: "This is an impressive score, intelligently-written and while it lacks crash-bang-wallop thrills, that’s perhaps what makes it even more entertaining."

Daniel Schweiger of Assignment X wrote: "More than adding the remaining 10 inches and 90 pounds to comfortably fill Tom Cruise’s physique into Jack Reacher's literary frame, Joe Kraemer proves himself as this year’s best bad-ass musical makeup artist, one who will hopefully be committing far more major Hollywood crimes to come after this."

Brent Simon of Screen International wrote: "while Joe Kraemer contributes a serviceable score, the director also makes notable use of music’s frequent utter absence — particularly in a solid car chase scene and shootout in a gravel quarry, in which grinding gears and gunshot echoes, respectively, are artfully elevated to tense emotional markers." Richard Corliss of Time wrote: "Joe Kraemer’s thumping score, which, during helicopter shots of the crime scene, explodes like God’s farts over Pittsburgh." In contrast, Jason Pirodsky of The Prague Reporter criticised the score as an "unmemorable dud".

Kraemer's score has been longlisted as one among the 104 contenders for the Academy Award for Best Original Score at the 85th ceremony for films released in 2012.

== Credits ==
Credits adapted from CD liner notes.

- Nico Abondolo – bass
- Richard Altenbach – violin
- Steven Becknell – percussion
- Charlie Bisharat – violin
- Chris Bleth – oboe
- Annie Bosler – percussion
- Bruce Botnick – engineer, mixing
- Jacqueline Brand – violin
- Robert Brophy – viola
- Roberto Cani – violin
- Heather Clark – flute
- Stuart Clark – clarinet
- Giovanna Clayton – cello
- Paul Cohen – cello
- Kevin Connolly – violin
- Rose Corrigan – bassoon
- Wade Culbreath – percussion
- Tim Davies – orchestration
- Brian Dembow – viola
- Thomas Diener – viola
- Stephen Dress – bass
- Andrew Duckles – viola
- Erika Duke-Kirkpatrick – cello
- Bruce Dukov – violin
- Stephen Erdody – cello
- Alan Estes – percussion
- Dave Everson – percussion
- Nina Evtuhov – violin
- Judith Farmer – bassoon
- Alma Fernandez – viola
- John Finklea – music editor
- Marlow Fisher – viola
- Allen Fogle – percussion
- Vanessa Freebairn-Smith – cello
- Lorenz Gamma – violin
- Michael V. Gerhard – executive in charge of music
- Julie Gigante – violin
- Dan Goldwasser – executive in charge of music, session photographer
- Gregory Goodall – percussion
- Craig Gosnell – trombone
- Agnes Gottschewski – violin
- Richard Grant – auricle programming
- Tim Greiving – liner notes
- Justin Hageman – percussion
- Jennie Hansen – viola
- Dylan Hart – percussion
- Thomas Harte Jr. – bass
- Tamara Hatwan – violin
- Gary Hickman – Tuba
- Oscar Hidalgo – bass
- Paula Hochhalter – cello
- Michael Hoffman – trombone
- Steven Hoffman – trombone
- Alex Iles – trombone
- Pamela Jacobson – viola
- Dennis Karmazyn – cello
- Phillip Keen – trombone
- Randy Kerber – keyboards
- Joe Kraemer – composer, conductor, liner notes, soundtrack producer
- Aimee Kreston – violin
- Armen Ksajikian – cello
- Timothy Landauer – cello
- Songa Lee – violin
- Natalie Leggett – violin
- Phillip Levy – violin
- Lorand Lokuszta – violin
- Timothy Loo – cello
- Maya Magub – violin
- Shawn Mann – viola
- Darrin McCann – viola
- Serena McKinney – violin
- Christopher McQuarrie – liner notes
- Edward Meares – bass
- Joseph Meyer – percussion
- Bruce Morgenthaler – bass
- Helen Nightingale – violin
- Michael Nowak – viola
- Brian O'Connor – percussion
- Katherine Oliver – bassoon
- Adam Olmstead – digital recording
- Geoffrey Osika – bass
- David Parmeter – bass
- Nicolas Philippon – bass
- Radu Pieptea – violin
- Katia Popov – violin
- Susan Ranney – bass
- Jason Richmond – soundtrack co-ordination
- Rafael Rishik – violin
- Jay Rosen – violin
- Geri Rotella – flute
- Peter Rotter – orchestra contractor
- Zack Ryan – orchestration
- Bart Samolis – bass
- Neil Samples – violin
- Marc Sazer – violin
- Steven Schaeffer – percussion
- Kim Scholes – cello
- Andrew Shulman – cello
- Randy Spendlove – executive soundtrack producer
- Tereza Stanislav – violin
- Lisa M. Sutton – violin
- James Thatcher – percussion
- Sarah Tpercussionblade – violin
- Doug Tornquist – Tuba
- Jo Ann Turovsky – Harp
- Michael Valerio – bass
- Matt Verboys – executive in charge of music
- Josefina Vergara – violin
- Irina Voloshina – violin
- Dave Walther – viola
- John Walz – cello
- David Washburn – trumpet
- Booker White – music preparation
- Roger Wilkie – violin
- Don Williams – percussion
- Ralph Williams – clarinet
- Phillip Yao – percussion
- Yelena Yegoryan – violin
- Xiao-Dan Zheng – cello
