= Christopher McQuarrie's unrealized projects =

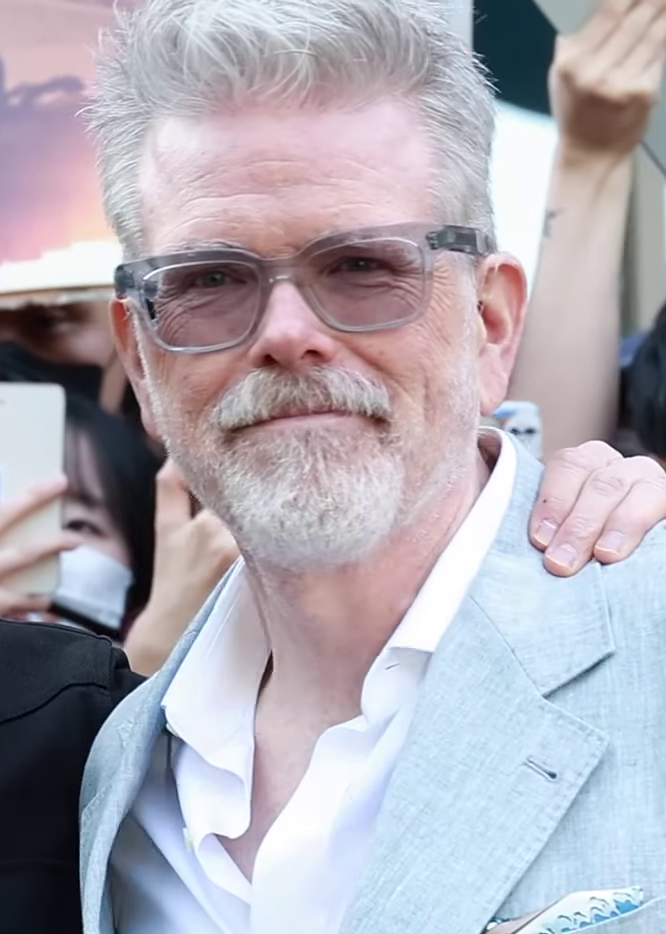
McQuarrie in 2025

During his long career, American filmmaker Christopher McQuarrie has worked on a number of projects which never progressed beyond the pre-production stage under his direction. Some of these projects fell into development hell, were officially cancelled, or would eventually be completed by a different production team.

== 1990s ==
=== Alexander ===
Since the mid-1990s, McQuarrie had worked on an Alexander the Great epic that he wanted to make his directorial debut, budgeted at $85 million. On June 9, 1998, it was reported by Variety that he had completed the script, and that Warner Bros. was eyeing Matthew McConaughey for the lead. On July 30, 1999, it was reported that McQuarrie was currently attached as the project's director. With Alexander, he sought to make a film that would be "similar to the films I grew up on that were larger than life with grand heroic characters at the center." On November 17, 2000, McQuarrie revealed that he was retooling the project after having directed The Way of the Gun. "My vision of Alexander has been completely blown apart," he said. "I am starting all over from scratch. Knowledge is death in my experience. The more I know about film, the harder it is to create freely." On October 22, 2001, Martin Scorsese became attached to direct the script, with Leonardo DiCaprio lined up to star as Alexander.

=== Untitled Che Guevera project ===
On November 4, 1998, it was reported that Laura Bickford would serve as producer on an upcoming Che Guevera project that McQuarrie planned to write and direct.

== 2000s ==
=== The Prisoner ===
On April 5, 2000, it was announced that McQuarrie would script the film adaptation of the 1960s television series The Prisoner, under director Simon West and producer Barry Mendel at Universal Pictures with Patrick McGoohan, who created the original series, serving as executive producer. By August 2006, it was reported that Christopher Nolan was attached to direct the project, using a different script by David and Janet Peoples. In January 2016, it was announced that Ridley Scott had entered talks to direct the project, with William Monahan having written the most recent draft.

=== Nocturne ===
Also in 2000, McQuarrie worked with ABC on the Touchstone drama pilot episode Nocturne.

=== Men of Destiny ===
On March 25, 2002, IGN reported that McQuarrie was being sought to perform rewrites for the historical epic Men of Destiny, directed by John Woo and initially written by Tom Vaughan and previously revised by Mike Werb and Michael Colleary. McQuarrie's involvement with the project was confirmed in August.

=== Untitled ABC detective series ===
On August 6, 2002, it was announced that McQuarrie was partnering with Touchstone Television to create and develop a detective drama series for ABC about a husband and wife crime-solving duo, with the project being developed for the fall of 2003.

=== Iron Curtain ===
McQuarrie had written the action thriller screenplay Iron Curtain in 2003, and by March 2004 was attached to also direct and produce the project for Intermedia, before the rights later transferred to the Resurgence Media Group. On April 24, 2023, it was announced that the project had been revived at Amazon Studios, with McQuarrie and Erik Jendresen set to rewrite the screenplay and McQuarrie also producing the project alongside Michael B. Jordan's Outlier Society.

=== Untitled military action adventure film ===
On March 18, 2004, it was reported that McQuarrie would write the screenplay for an untitled military action adventure film for Paramount Pictures, with Sean Daniel, Jim Jacks, and Michelle Manning producing and McQuarrie also serving as an executive producer.

=== The Stanford Prison Experiment ===
On July 18, 2004, it was announced that McQuarrie would produce and potentially direct a film about the 1971 Stanford prison experiment for Maverick Films, supervising a screenplay by Tim Talbott. By August 2008, it was reported that the project was expected to begin production in January 2009, with McQuarrie confirmed as the director. McQuarrie described the project in 2008 as "a very small movie". The film was ultimately directed by Kyle Patrick Alvarez and produced by Abandon Features, Coup d’État Films, and Sandbar Pictures, with IFC Films acquiring the film in March 2015.

=== Logan's Run remake ===
In February 2005, McQuarrie was hired to rewrite the screenplay of a remake of Logan's Run (1976), to be directed by Bryan Singer and produced by Joel Silver. In June 2010, it was reported that Alex Garland was now writing the screenplay, with Carl Rinsch attached to direct.

=== Booth ===
Sometime in the mid-2000s, in the interim between working on several other projects, McQuarrie wrote a script about John Wilkes Booth. By April 2013, the project was still unproduced, with McQuarrie describing the project and The Last Mission in an interview with Empire as projects "I have to ask permission" to make.

=== The Last Mission ===
In December 2008, during an interview with Mike Russell, McQuarrie revealed he and his Valkyrie co-writer Nathan Alexander were developing a screenplay called The Last Mission, about the Kyūjō incident, that they had written simultaneously with Valkyrie. By April 2013, the project was still unproduced, with McQuarrie describing the project and Booth in an interview with Empire as projects "I have to ask permission" to make.

=== The Champions ===
On November 16, 2008, it was announced that McQuarrie would co-write and co-produce with Guillermo del Toro a film adaptation of the 1960s television series The Champions for United Artists, with Tom Cruise and Paula Wagner also producing the project.

=== The Monster of Florence ===
It was additionally announced on November 16, 2008, that McQuarrie intended to write a film for United Artists based on Douglas Preston and Mario Spezi's true crime book The Monster of Florence: A True Story (2008), which McQuarrie had optioned two years previously; McQuarrie would also serve as producer alongside Dan Jinks and Bruce Cohen. On January 4, 2011, it was announced that the project had moved to Fox 2000, with George Clooney now attached to star as Douglas Preston and McQuarrie now co-writing the script with Nathan Alexander.

=== Flying Tigers ===
On December 18, 2008, it was announced that McQuarrie was set to reunite with Tom Cruise on the war film Flying Tigers, based on the aviation unit of the same name, with McQuarrie writing the screenplay with Mason Alley for New Regency. The project was one of three potential collaborations being developed by McQuarrie for Cruise at the time, alongside The Champions and The Tourist.

=== The Wolverine ===
On August 14, 2009, it was reported that McQuarrie had been hired to write the screenplay for the sequel to X-Men Origins: Wolverine for 20th Century Fox. On March 3, 2010, McQuarrie had finished the script, and the project was reportedly set to begin production in January 2011. On June 15, 2011, James Mangold was selected to direct the film, replacing Darren Aronofsky. By September, Mark Bomback was set to rewrite the screenplay.

== 2010s ==
=== Unforgiven film ===
On August 25, 2010, it was announced that GK Films had set McQuarrie to write a film adaptation of the British miniseries Unforgiven (2009) as a potential star vehicle for Angelina Jolie. On November 8, 2011, it was announced that Scott Frank had been hired to direct the project and would also perform rewrites on the script. On June 25, 2013, it was announced that McQuarrie was set to return to the project, and would now serve as director and producer as well as writer. On November 4, 2019, it was announced that Sandra Bullock would star in and produce the film, which had been set up at Netflix, with Nora Fingscheidt now set to direct. The film was eventually released on Netflix on December 10, 2021, under the title The Unforgivable, with Peter Craig, Hillary Seitz, and Courtenay Miles credited for the screenplay.

=== Star Blazers ===
In February 2011, McQuarrie was hired by Skydance Media to write and produce a feature film adaptation of the 1970s animated television series Star Blazers (itself an adaptation of anime Space Battleship Yamato). In 2013, he was selected to direct the project, with Zach Dean being hired to write a new draft of the script in 2017.

=== Rubicon ===
On October 14, 2011, it was announced that McQuarrie would write, direct, and produce Rubicon, a new multimedia property which was to be centered around United States Navy SEALs and would additionally be developed as a video game and graphic novel.

=== Without Remorse ===
On August 7, 2012, it was announced that McQuarrie would write and produce a film adaptation of the Tom Clancy novel Without Remorse for Paramount Pictures, with an eye towards directing the project. By 2018, McQuarrie was no longer involved with the project, with Michael B. Jordan set to star and produce and Stefano Sollima directing.

=== Ice Station Zebra remake ===
On May 6, 2013, it was announced that McQuarrie had been set by Warner Bros. to write and direct the action thriller Ice Station Zebra, a remake of the 1968 film of the same name and itself adapted from the 1963 novel by Alistair MacLean.

=== Three to Kill ===
On November 20, 2013, it was announced that McQuarrie would direct an adaptation of the Jean-Patrick Manchette novel Three to Kill for Andrew Lauren Productions, with Colin Firth set to star in the project and Howard A. Rodman writing the screenplay.

=== Jack Reacher sequel ===
At the time Jack Reacher was made, McQuarrie had plans with Tom Cruise for future installments in which "Reacher could have been an R-rated movie and an R-rated franchise and really fed into the brutality of those books." However, McQuarrie and Cruise would move onto other projects, while the sequel, Jack Reacher: Never Go Back, would be directed by Edward Zwick instead.

=== The Chameleon ===
On July 26, 2017, it was announced that McQuarrie and Terence Winter were developing The Chameleon for Netflix, based on a New Yorker article by David Grann about Frédéric Bourdin, with McQuarrie aiming the direct the project while Winter co-wrote the screenplay with Carl Capotorto. Winter and McQuarrie were also set to produce the project alongside Rachel Winter and Heather McQuarrie.

=== Man of Steel sequel ===
In April 2018, it was reported that McQuarrie and Henry Cavill had discussed ideas for a Man of Steel sequel during production of Mission: Impossible – Fallout. However, his story pitch was rejected by Warner Bros.

=== Green Lantern Corps ===
McQuarrie also admittedly pitched to Warner Bros. another project centering on the Green Lantern Corps, revealing via Twitter that it was meant as a tie-in film to the Man of Steel sequel.

== 2020s ==
=== Broadsword ===
In March 2020, McQuarrie and Tom Cruise discussed collaborating on a movie together with a "harder edge," that they later nicknamed The Gnarly Movie. During production of Mission: Impossible – The Final Reckoning (2025) in August 2022, it was reported that the two were planning ideas for their subsequent collaborations, and McQuarrie later stated that he was writing the film with his Mission: Impossible – Dead Reckoning (2023) co-writer Erik Jendresen. As preparation for production began, the film was titled Broadsword and linked to Warner Bros. Pictures, where Cruise had set up a partnership deal. In July 2024, Henry Cavill and Marion Cotillard joined the cast. Principal photography was expected to begin on July 7, 2025, with locations including France and London, England, under the working title Appalachia.

=== Untitled SpaceX film ===
On July 30, 2020, McQuarrie was set to serve as producer and story advisor on an untitled film developed with Cruise, SpaceX, and Universal Pictures as the prospective first ever narrative film to be shot in outer space, with Doug Liman writing and directing and an estimated cost of $200 million.

=== Untitled musical film ===
On August 8, 2022, it was also reported that Cruise and McQuarrie were also developing an original musical project as a star vehicle for Cruise.

=== Untitled Les Grossman film ===
Cruise and McQuarrie were also reported as interested in a project involving Les Grossman, Cruise's character in Tropic Thunder, though it was unknown if this would be an entire film centered on Grossman or if the character would be borrowed for one of the other projects. As of 2025, Cruise and McQuarrie continued to remain in discussions about the film.

=== Mission: Impossible sequels ===
In June 2023, McQuarrie told Fandango that Dead Reckoning (2023) and The Final Reckoning (2025) would not necessarily end the Mission: Impossible series, and that he and Cruise were developing ideas for future installments.

=== Sicario 3 ===
In October 2023, McQuarrie was confirmed to be involved in the third Sicario film, with producers saying the script was nearly complete.
