= Scott Storm =

American film director

Scott Storm (born March 25, 1966) is an American filmmaker, director, and animator. His work includes feature films such as Burn, Ten 'til Noon and We Run Shit, and animated short films The Apple Tree

Storm was born in Los Angeles, California, but moved to Albany, New York a few months later. Storm had already started attending New York's School of Visual Arts when met composer Joe Kraemer; Joe scored and acted in a feature-length film, The Chiming Hour. At the School of Visual Arts, Storm befriended Bryan Singer, through whom he also met Christopher McQuarrie. Storm finished his Bachelor of Fine Arts (Film and Television) at NYU's Tisch School of the Arts in 1989.

In 1996, Storm relocated to Los Angeles, where he worked as a production assistant on Bryan Singer's Apt Pupil.

In 1997, he directed feature film Burn, starring Andrea Roth and David Hayter. Burn premiered in 1998 at Slamdance Film Festival, winning the Special Jury Honor.

In 2004/2005, Storm directed Ten 'til Noon, starring Alfonso Freeman, which won numerous film festival awards, including Best of the Fest at ReelHeART International Film Festival and the Jury Award at the San Fernando Valley International Film Festival. "Ten 'til Noon" was described as "the Tarantino follow-up picture we've been waiting for since 1995. It just took two guys who aren't Quentin Tarantino to bring it to us." The film - and its film festival run - was at the center of the 2009 documentary, "Official Rejection". This time, Storm was in front of the camera, not behind it.

We Run Shit premiered at Phoenix Film Festival in 2012 and was a documentary co-directed by Storm and Michael Creighton Rogers; Storm also edited, and for this effort, won Best Editing awards at ReelHeART International Film Festival and Golden Door International Film Festival. The film also picked up Best Documentary at Phoenix Film Festival. Notably, Storm also made the animated sequences and won Best Animation at ReelHeART International Film Festival; this rekindled Storm's love of animation.

Storm worked on labor of love The Apple Tree sporadically from 2010 to 2015. It had its world premiere at Dances With Films 18 on May 30, 2015. Through its film festival run, the film picked up numerous awards, including Best Animation at Manhattan Film Festival and Seattle Shorts Film Festival.

Storm's upcoming animated short film, Custodian, is currently in production.
