= Joe Kraemer (composer) =

American composer (born 1971)

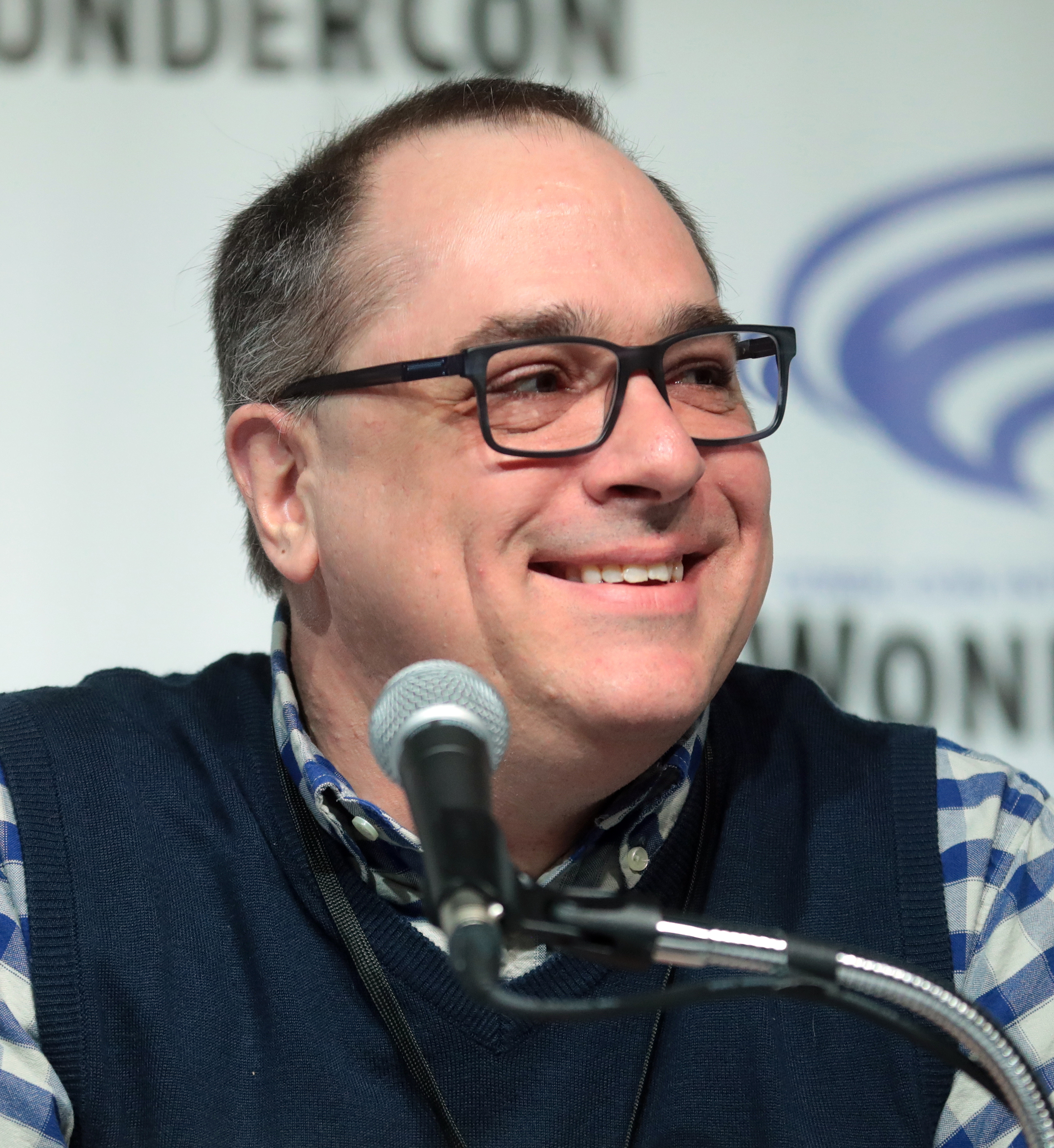
- Kraemer at the 2019 WonderCon

Background information
- Born: June 21, 1971 (age 55); Buffalo, New York, U.S.
- Genre: Film score
- Occupations: Composer, conductor
- Years active: 1986-present

Joe Kraemer (born June 21, 1971) is an American composer and conductor of film and television scores. He has worked with director Christopher McQuarrie several times -- The Way of the Gun (2000), Jack Reacher (2012), and Mission: Impossible – Rogue Nation (2015).

== Biography ==
Kraemer was born in Buffalo, New York and raised in Albany, New York. His father and uncle were both musicians, and Kraemer began taking piano lessons at an early age. In high school he befriended an older boy named Scott Storm, who became a professional filmmaker. Kraemer's first film score was for a Super-8 film written and directed by Storm, called Chiming Hour. Kraemer, who also acted in the film, was 15 at the time. Storm later introduced Kraemer to filmmakers Bryan Singer and Christopher McQuarrie.

While attending Berklee College of Music in Boston, Kraemer decided he wanted to be a film composer. Through contacts such as Singer and McQuarrie, he was able to obtain work first as a sound (and occasionally music) editor, before eventually crossing over into television and film composing.

Kraemer's first feature film score was the 2000 film The Way of the Gun, a modern-day western written and directed by Oscar-winner Christopher McQuarrie. The film starred Benicio del Toro, Ryan Phillippe, and James Caan. Though the film performed poorly at the box office, it became something of a cult classic, and some industry insiders began to expect great things from Kraemer. (Note: "Kraemer was heralded as one of film music’s ‘next big things’ following his excellent score for the thriller The Way of the Gun in 2000.")

Over the next few years, Kraemer scored music for the hit TV series Femme Fatales, the docudrama Emerald Cowboy (2003); in 2006 he teamed up with his old classmate Scott Storm for the low-budget crime thriller Ten 'til Noon, which won awards at the film festival level; and in 2008 he scored the direct-to-video thriller Joy Ride 2: Dead Ahead, written by J. J. Abrams.

In 2012, Kraemer got his chance, composing the score for the Tom Cruise action thriller Jack Reacher (directed by McQuarrie). His score was nominated in the Best Original Score - Feature Film category at the 2012 Hollywood Music In Media Awards. His credits also include the 2014 film Dawn Patrol, starring Scott Eastwood.

Kraemer worked with McQuarrie and Cruise again when he scored the fifth film in the Mission: Impossible franchise, Mission: Impossible – Rogue Nation (2015).

Since 2015, Kraemer has been providing music and sound design to a number of audio plays released by Big Finish Productions. These include spin-offs for Doctor Who characters such as Madam Vastra, Missy and Rose Tyler, starring the original actors.

In 2016, Kraemer was commissioned by the Dallas Chamber Symphony to write new music for F.W. Murnau's Sunrise: A Song of Two Humans. The score premiered on October 18, 2016, at Moody Performance Hall with Richard McKay conducting. Selections from the score were recorded and released on Caldera Records.

In 2017, Kraemer composed the score for the teen anthology series Creeped Out on CBBC.

== Filmography ==
=== Film ===
Year	Title	Director	Notes
1998	Burn	Scott Storm	
1999	Chi Girl	Heidi Van Lier	
2000	The Way of the Gun	Christopher McQuarrie	Also conductor
2000	Slammed	Michael Gene Brown	
2003	Hard Ground	Frank Q. Dobbs	
2004	Open House	Dan Mirvish	Composed with Andrew Melton
2004	Somewhere	Thomas Whelan	
2004	Dynamite	Walter Baltzer	
2005	All Souls Day	Jeremy Kasten	
2005	House of the Dead 2	Michael Hurst	
2005	My Big Fat Independent Movie	Philip Zlotorynski	Composed with Jeremy Sweet
2005	The Poseidon Adventure	John Putch	
2006	Monday	Heidi Van Lier	
2006	Ten 'til Noon	Scott Storm	
2006	Room 6	Michael Hurst	
2006	Grand Junction	Freddy F. Hakimi	
2006	The Thirst	Jeremy Kasten	
2006	Dead and Deader	Patrick Dinhut	
2006	The Darkroom	Michael Hurst	
2007	Sacrifices of the Heart	David S. Cass Sr.	
2008	Joy Ride 2: Dead Ahead	Louis Morneau	
2010	Confession of a Gangster	Kenneth Castillo	
2012	Jack Reacher	Christopher McQuarrie	Also conductor BMI Film Music Award for Best Film Music
2013	Favor	Paul Osborne	
2014	Dawn Patrol	Daniel Petrie Jr.	
2015	Boned	Laura Lee Bahr	Composed with Jeremy Broomfield
2015	Mission: Impossible – Rogue Nation	Christopher McQuarrie	Also conductor Original Mission: Impossible themes by Lalo Schifrin; IFMCA Award for Best Original Score for an Action/Adventure/Thriller Film; World Soundtrack Award for Discovery of the Year
2016	Blood Moon	Kenneth Kokin	
2018	Cruel Hearts	Paul Osborne	Composed with Ian Arber and John Massari
2018	The Man Who Killed Hitler and Then the Bigfoot	Robert D. Krzykowski	
2020	Emily and the Magical Journey	Marcus Ovnell	Previously called Faunutland and the Lost Magic
2022	Old Man	Lucky McKee	

=== Television ===
Year	Title	Studio	Episode(s)
1997	Cartoon Sushi	MTV; Teletoon	1
2009	Misadventures in Matchmaking	—N/a	5
2011	Femme Fatales	Cinemax	8
2017	Comrade Detective	Amazon Video	6
2017	Creeped Out	CBBC; Family Channel	13

=== Audiobooks ===
Since 2015, Kraemer has been providing music and sound design to a number of audio plays released by Big Finish Productions. At first, these were mainly Doctor Who Monthly Adventures plays, but Kraemer has moved to work mainly on spin-offs from the main range.

Year	Title	Music	Sound Design
2015	Doctor Who: The Defectors	Yes	Yes
2016	Doctor Who: Absolute Power	Yes	Yes
2017	Doctor Who: Vortex Ice / Cortex Fire	Yes	Yes
2017	Doctor Who: The Behemoth	Yes	With Josh Arakelian
2017	Doctor Who: Static	Yes	With Josh Arakelian
2018	Doctor Who: Kingdom of Lies	Yes	With Josh Arakelian
2018	Doctor Who: The Helliax Rift	Yes	With Josh Arakelian
2018	Jenny - The Doctor's Daughter	Yes	With Josh Arakelian
2018	Doctor Who: Red Planets	Yes	With Josh Arakelian
2018	Doctor Who: The Dispossessed	Yes	With Josh Arakelian
2018	Doctor Who: The Quantum Possibility Engine	Yes	With Josh Arakelian
2019	Missy: Series 1	Yes	With Josh Arakelian
2019	The Eighth of March	Yes	With Nigel Fairs and Howard Carter
2019	The Paternoster Gang: Heritage 1	Yes	Yes
2019	Transference	Yes	No
2019	Rose Tyler: The Dimension Cannon	Yes	With Josh Arakelian
2019	The Paternoster Gang: Heritage 2	Yes	With Josh Arakelian
2019	The Robots 1	Yes	With Josh Arakelian
2020	The Paternoster Gang: Heritage 3	Yes	With Josh Arakelian
2020	Missy: Series 2	Yes	No
2020	The Robots 2	Yes	Yes
2020	The Paternoster Gang: Heritage 4	Yes	Yes
2020	The Robots 3	Yes	No
2021	Masterful	Yes	Yes
2021	Space 1999: Volume 1	Incidental	No
2021	Thunderbirds: Terror from the Stars	Yes	No
2021	The Box of Delights	Yes	No
2021	First Action Bureau Series 01	Yes	No
2021	The Robots 4	Yes	With Kristin Simpson
2021	Doctor Who: The God of Phantoms	Yes	Yes
