= Jack the Giant Slayer =

2013 fantasy adventure film by Bryan Singer

- Theatrical release poster
- Directed by: Bryan Singer
- Screenplay by: Darren Lemke; Christopher McQuarrie; Dan Studney
- Story by: Darren Lemke; David Dobkin
- Based on: "Jack the Giant Killer"; "Jack and the Beanstalk"
- Produced by: Neal H. Moritz; David Dobkin; Bryan Singer; Patrick McCormick; Ori Marmur
- Starring: Nicholas Hoult; Eleanor Tomlinson; Stanley Tucci; Ian McShane; Bill Nighy; Ewan McGregor
- Cinematography: Newton Thomas Sigel
- Edited by: John Ottman; Bob Ducsay
- Music by: John Ottman
- Production companies: New Line Cinema; Legendary Pictures; Original Film; Big Kid Pictures; Bad Hat Harry Productions
- Distributed by: Warner Bros. Pictures
- Release dates: February 26, 2013 (Hollywood); March 1, 2013 (United States)
- Running time: 114 minutes
- Country: United States
- Language: English
- Budget: $185–200 million
- Box office: $197.7 million

Jack the Giant Slayer (previously titled Jack the Giant Killer) is a 2013 American fantasy adventure film directed by Bryan Singer and written by Darren Lemke, Christopher McQuarrie and Dan Studney, from a story by Lemke and David Dobkin. The film, based on the British fairy tales "Jack the Giant Killer" and "Jack and the Beanstalk", stars Nicholas Hoult, Eleanor Tomlinson, Stanley Tucci, Ian McShane, Bill Nighy, and Ewan McGregor. The film tells the story of Jack, a young farmhand who must save a captured princess from a race of giants after accidentally opening a gateway to their land in the sky while also contending with a crooked lord.

Development of Jack the Giant Slayer began in 2005, when Lemke first pitched the idea. D. J. Caruso was hired to direct the film in January 2009, but in September of that year, Caruso was replaced by Singer, who hired McQuarrie and Studney to rework the script. The main characters were cast between February and March 2011, and principal photography began in April 2011 in England with locations in Somerset, Gloucestershire and Norfolk. The release of the film was moved back in post-production to allow more time for visual effects and marketing.

Jack the Giant Slayer premiered on February 26, 2013, in Hollywood. It was released theatrically in the United States by Warner Bros. Pictures on March 1, 2013, receiving mixed reviews from critics and was a box-office failure, earning $197.7 million worldwide against a budget of $185–200 million.

== Plot ==
In the Kingdom of Cloister, monks craft magic beans that grow into a large beanstalk. They reach Gantua, home to a race of man-eating giants. The giants kill the monks and attack the Earth below. Using a magical crown made from a giant's heart that lets its wearer control the giants, King Erik forces them to return to Gantua, and the beanstalk is cut down. When Erik dies, his crown and the remaining beans are buried with him for safekeeping.

Years later, Jack, an eighteen-year-old peasant, is sent by his uncle to sell his horse Anser at the market. There, he runs into a disguised Princess Isabelle, whom the royal guards, led by Captain Elmont, take back to the castle. Meanwhile, Lord Roderick, advisor to King Brahmwell, secretly steals the beans and crown for his own gain. A monk steals the beans from Roderick, runs into Jack while trying to escape, and exchanges the beans for Anser. Warning Jack not to get the beans wet, the monk flees, pursued by the guards.

Isabelle later sneaks out of the castle again, but is caught in a storm and seeks shelter at Jack's house. While they talk, the rain leaks into the house and wets one of the magic beans. It grows into a massive beanstalk that traps Isabelle in the house as it is lifted into the sky. The next morning, Brahmwell sends a team of knights led by Elmont and Roderick up the beanstalk to retrieve Isabelle; Jack volunteers to join. During the climb, Roderick secretly causes most of the knights to fall to their deaths. After reaching Gantua, Roderick corners Jack and takes the remaining beans, though Jack secretly keeps one.

The group splits up. A giant knocks out Elmont and his second-in-command, Crawe, and takes them captive. Meanwhile, another giant attacks Roderick and his servant Wicke. Wicke is eaten, but Roderick reveals Erik's magic crown and forces the giants to obey him. Elmont and Crawe are taken to the giants' two-headed leader, Fallon, and are reunited with Isabelle, with Jack secretly following. Fallon eats Crawe, and then Roderick arrives to take command of the giant horde. He proclaims himself king of the giants and orders them to descend the beanstalk and conquer the world for him.

Jack frees Isabelle and Elmont from a giant preparing to cook them, and the three flee towards the beanstalk. When King Brahmwell see a giant accidentally fall to the ground, he fears an invasion and orders the beanstalk cut down. While Jack and Isabelle climb down the beanstalk, Elmont stays behind to confront Roderick and kills him. Fallon then takes the crown and claims the title of king of the giants. Meanwhile, the beanstalk is successfully cut down, and Jack, Isabelle, and Elmont safely ride it down as it collapses. Isabelle is reunited with Brahmwell, who rewards Jack for her rescue. Fallon finds the remaining beans and uses them to grow more beanstalks, which the giants ride down.

Reuniting with Anser, Jack sees the descending beanstalks and races to warn Isabelle. After they reach the safety of the city walls, they raise the drawbridge and pour oil into the moat to set it on fire. Initially drowning in the fiery moat, Fallon finds an underwater passageway into the castle. While the other giants overwhelm the royal guards, Fallon captures Jack and Isabelle. Fallon prepares to eat Jack, but Jack throws the last bean down his throat. The bean grows into another beanstalk, ripping Fallon apart from within. Jack takes the crown and uses it to stop the giants' attack.

After the giants are forced back to Gantua and cut down their beanstalks, Brahmwell allows Jack and Isabelle to marry. Their story becomes a popular fairy tale and the crown is secretly crafted into St Edward's Crown. In the present-day at the Tower of London, a member of the tour group gazes at the crown. Meanwhile, Gantua still exists above London.

== Cast ==
- Nicholas Hoult as Jack, a young farmhand who leads the quest to find the princess.
  - Michael Self as young Jack
- Eleanor Tomlinson as Princess Isabelle, the princess who is taken by giants and is the king's daughter.
- Stanley Tucci as Lord Roderick, a lord and the king's advisor who plans on taking over the kingdom.
- Ian McShane as King Brahmwell, the ruler of Cloister and Isabelle's father who wants his daughter to marry Lord Roderick.
- Bill Nighy as the voice and motion-capture of General Fallon, the leader of the giants
- Ewan McGregor as Elmont, the captain of the royal guards who joins the quest to rescue the princess.
- Eddie Marsan as Crawe, Elmont's second-in-command and a member of the royal guards.
- Ewen Bremner as Wicke, Lord Roderick's attendant.
- Ralph Brown as General Entin, the leader of King Brahmwell's army.
- John Kassir as the voice of General Fallon's small head
- Cornell John as the voice and motion-capture of Fee, a giant lieutenant.
- Andrew Brooke as the voice and motion-capture of Fye, a giant lieutenant.
- Angus Barnett as the voice and motion-capture of Foe, a giant lieutenant.
- Ben Daniels as the voice and motion-capture of Fumm, a giant lieutenant who resents Fallon.
- Christopher Fairbank as Jack's uncle
- Warwick Davis as Old Hamm
- Philip Philmar as the voice and motion-capture of the Cook Giant, a giant with a cataract in one eye that tries to cook Isabelle and Elmont.
- Peter Elliott as the voice and motion-capture of:
  - A giant sentry
  - A bugler giant
- Don McCorkindale as the voice and motion-capture of a tongue giant

== Production ==
It's a very traditional fairytale, probably the most traditional thing I've ever done. But it'll also be a fun twist on the notion of how these tales are told ... Fairytales are often borne of socio-political commentary and translated into stories for children. But what if they were based on something that really happened?.. What if we look back at the story that inspired the story that you read to your kids? That's kind of what this movie's about.

— Bryan Singer, director of Jack the Giant Slayer, about the film

=== Development ===
Screenwriter Darren Lemke first proposed the idea of contemporizing the "Jack and the Beanstalk" fairy tale with CGI in 2005 before the release of other contemporary films based on fairy tales such as Alice in Wonderland (2010), Red Riding Hood (2011) and Snow White and the Huntsman (2012). Lemke described the script as "a male-oriented story of a boy becoming a man" and drew a parallel between Jack and Luke Skywalker of Star Wars. In January 2009, New Line Cinema hired D. J. Caruso to direct the script, which was subsequently rewritten by Mark Bomback. By August 2009, it was reported that Bryan Singer might be replacing Caruso; this became official in September 2009.

In April 2010, Singer re-teamed with screenwriter Christopher McQuarrie to rework the screenplay. Singer and McQuarrie had previously collaborated on Public Access, The Usual Suspects, Apt Pupil, and Valkyrie. Singer stated, "Chris McQuarrie did a significant re-write for me. He brought a different structure. It was very much a page-one situation; a different storyline. It involved the same characters, but some we juggled around and switched around. He just brought a very different perspective". McQuarrie's re-write included a deeper back story for the giants and explanation of their relationship with the humans, which Singer considered a "vast improvement"; it also upped the budget. To get the budget back in line, Singer brought in television writer Dan Studney to work on the project.

In May 2010, ReelzChannel reported that production of the film would be delayed until February 2011. The report cited Singer's interest in being able to pre-visualize scenes with the digital giants in-camera with the live-action actors (a la James Cameron's Avatar) and the need for more time to work out the complex process as reasons for the delay.

=== Pre-production ===
In October 2010, New Line Cinema gave Bryan Singer the green-light to begin pre-production work on Jack the Giant Killer, with production scheduled to begin the following spring. In November 2010, Singer began screen-testing for the male and female leads. Aaron Johnson, Nicholas Hoult, and Aneurin Barnard were considered for the role of the young farmhand, and Adelaide Kane, Lily Collins, and Juno Temple tested for the princess role.

In December 2010, Singer said, "I'm very much looking forward to using the EPIC Red for my next movie Jack the Giant Killer which will be shot in, what else, 3D. The camera's incredibly compact size and extraordinary resolution are ideal for the 3D format. But more importantly Jack the Giant Killer is my first movie set in a time before electricity. The EPIC's extraordinary exposure latitude will allow me to more effectively explore the use of natural light".

In February 2011, The Hollywood Reporter reported that Stanley Tucci had been cast as the antagonist, the king's advisor who plans on taking over the kingdom, and Bill Nighy and John Kassir were cast as Fallon, the two-headed leader of the giants; Nighy would play the big head and Kassir would play the smaller head. Also in February, Nicholas Hoult was offered the lead role. Singer said he had liked him since Skins and was very supportive of his casting in X-Men: First Class. Later that month, Ewan McGregor joined the cast as the leader of the king's elite guard, who helps fight giants.

In March 2011, Eleanor Tomlinson was cast opposite Nicholas Hoult as the princess and Ian McShane was cast to play her father, King Brahmwell. Two days later, New Line Cinema and Warner Bros. Pictures announced a release date of June 15, 2012.

=== Filming ===
Principal photography began on April 12, 2011, in the British countryside. In May 2011, production moved to Somerset, England for two weeks with filming scheduled in Wells, Cheddar and secret locations in the county including scenes filmed at Wells Cathedral. Also in May, scenes were shot at Puzzlewood in the Forest of Dean near Coleford, Gloucestershire. Puzzlewood, which features unusual tree and rock formations, has previously been used for filming of the BBC TV series Doctor Who and Merlin. The same forest is said to have inspired J. R. R. Tolkien to write The Hobbit. Later that month, filming took place at Norwich Cathedral in Norwich, Norfolk.

About the motion-capture process Singer stated, "It's fascinating ... It takes you back to play-acting as a kid in your living room because you are running around and having to imagine that you are in Gantua and imagine that there are these weapons and all these giant things. But there's nothing when you are there other than styrofoam and blocks. It forces the actors to regress to when they would play-act as kids or do minimalist theatre. But in that way it's fascinating - I can see why Robert Zemeckis and James Cameron have started to shoot pictures this way".

=== Visual effects and post-production ===
The giant beanstalk, before and after it was rendered with computer graphics

In January 2012, Warner Bros. moved back the release date by nine months, from June 15, 2012, to March 22, 2013. The Hollywood Reporter stated: "Warner can likely afford the move because of Christopher Nolan's The Dark Knight Rises, which opened in July. And moving the film back gives the studio more time for special effects, as well as a chance to attach trailers for it to Peter Jackson's Christmas tentpole The Hobbit: An Unexpected Journey". In October 2012, Warner Bros. again moved the release date, this time to March 1, 2013, three weeks earlier than the previous date. Warner Bros also changed the title of the film from Jack the Giant Killer to Jack the Giant Slayer.

The film's visual effects were completed by seven different visual effects houses: Digital Domain, Giant Studios, The Third Floor, Moving Picture Company (MPC), Soho VFX, Rodeo FX and Hatch Productions. Creating the giants took four main steps. The first step was Pre-Capture, in which motion capture was used to capture the actor's facial and body movements and render them in a real-time virtual environment. The second step took place during principal photography, where Simulcam technology was used to help the human characters virtually interact with the giants that were rendered earlier in Pre-Capture. The third step was Post-Capture, a second motion capture shoot to adjust giants' movements to seamlessly fit the live-action performances. The final step involved putting the finishing touches on the giant's animation, skin, hair and clothing, and composition in the shots. Creating the beanstalk involved two main requirements: set extension for shots of the actors interacting with the beanstalk, which were shot against a bluescreen, and complete CGI renderings for shots of the beanstalk growing and extending from Earth into the world of the giants.

Singer stated that he had to tone down the visual effects to keep the film age-appropriate for children. He said, "This movie probably has a bigger on-screen body count than any movie I've done before. It's done in a way that's fun, but it was a challenge to get away with that without it becoming upsetting to people ... It was about creating a tone like Raiders of the Lost Ark or Star Wars that allows you to get away with a lot of stuff because it feels like a movie."

== Soundtrack ==
Jack The Giant Slayer: Original Motion Picture Soundtrack

Soundtrack album by John Ottman
- Released: February 26, 2013
- Genre: Classical
- Length: 1:12:51
- Label: WaterTower Music

The film's soundtrack features music composed by John Ottman, who also served as an editor and associate producer on the film. Jack the Giant Slayer marks Ottman's seventh collaboration with director Bryan Singer; they previously worked together on Public Access, The Usual Suspects, Apt Pupil, X2: X-Men United, Superman Returns, and Valkyrie. The soundtrack album was released on February 26, 2013, by WaterTower Music.

Jack The Giant Slayer: Original Motion Picture Soundtrack
No.	Title	Length
1.	"Jack and Isabelle (Theme from Jack the Giant Slayer)"	3:56
2.	"Logo Mania"	1:00
3.	"To Cloister"	1:28
4.	"The Climb"	2:41
5.	"Fee Appears"	3:16
6.	"How Do You Do"	2:23
7.	"Why Do People Scream?"	3:17
8.	"Story of the Giants"	3:22
9.	"Welcome to Gantua"	4:12
10.	"Power of the Crown"	1:21
11.	"Not Wildly Keen on Heights"	2:19
12.	"Top of the World"	2:30
13.	"The Legends Are True / First Kiss"	3:43
14.	"Roderick's Demise / The Beanstalk Falls"	5:36
15.	"Kitchen Nightmare"	3:24
16.	"Onward and Downward!"	3:19
17.	"Waking a Sleeping Giant"	2:21
18.	"Chase to Cloister"	5:19
19.	"Goodbyes"	2:29
20.	"The Battle"	5:31
21.	"Sniffing Out Fear / All is Lost"	5:07
22.	"The New King / Stories"	4:17
Total length:		1:12:51

== Release ==
Jack the Giant Slayer premiered on Tuesday, February 26, 2013, at TCL Chinese Theatre in Los Angeles, California.

== Reception ==
=== Box office ===
Pre-release tracking showed that Jack the Giant Slayer was projected to gross $30 million to $35 million in its opening weekend, a disappointing figure considering it cost at least $185 million to produce. The film grossed $400,000 from Thursday night and midnight runs, ahead of its wide release open on Friday, March 1, 2013. Through the weekend, the film grossed $28.01 million in North America at 3,525 locations, taking first place at the box office. The audience was 55% male and 56% were over the age of 25, despite the studio's efforts to target families. At the same time, the film took in an additional $13.7 million in 10 Asian markets at 1,824 locations.

Four weeks into its theatrical run, The Hollywood Reporter reported that the film was on track to lose between $125 million and $140 million for Legendary Pictures, suggesting that the film would likely close at $200 million worldwide, short of its combined production and marketing budget. Jack the Giant Slayer closed in theaters on June 13, 2013, grossing a total of $65,187,603 in North America and $197,687,603 worldwide. In explaining its box office failure, analysts pointed to the conflict between the director's darker, more adult-themed vision with the studio's desire for a family-friendly product, leading to the final compromise of a PG-13 film that did not sufficiently appeal to adults or children.

=== Critical reception ===
Jack the Giant Slayer received a mixed response from film critics. On the review aggregation website Rotten Tomatoes the film has a rating of 52%, based on 208 reviews, with an average rating of 5.70/10. The site's critical consensus reads, "It's enthusiastically acted and reasonably fun, but Jack the Giant Slayer is also overwhelmed by digital effects and a bland, impersonal story." On Metacritic, it has a weighted average score of 51 out of 100, based on 37 critics, indicating "mixed or average" reviews. Audiences surveyed by CinemaScore gave the film a grade "B+" on scale of A to F.

Todd McCarthy of The Hollywood Reporter said, "Simply in terms of efficient storytelling, clear logistics and consistent viewer engagement, Jack is markedly superior to the recent Hobbit." Richard Roeper of the Chicago Sun-Times said, "Jack the Giant Slayer is a rousing, original and thoroughly entertaining adventure."

Justin Chang of Variety said, "Jack the Giant Slayer feels, unsurprisingly, like an attempt to cash in on a trend, recycling storybook characters, situations and battle sequences to mechanical and wearyingly predictable effect." Manohla Dargis of The New York Times said, "This finally is just a digitally souped-up, one-dimensional take on 'Jack and the Beanstalk'." Kenneth Turan of the Los Angeles Times said, "Bryan Singer's take on the old fairy tale has all things money can buy — except a good script."

=== Accolades ===
Awards
Year	Award	Category	Recipient	Result	Ref.
2013	Phoenix Film Critics Society	The Overlooked Film of the Year	Jack the Giant Slayer	Nominated	
2013	Phoenix Film Critics Society	Best Visual Effects	Jack the Giant Slayer	Nominated	
2013	BMI Film & TV Awards	Film Music Award	John Ottman	Won	
2014	Saturn Awards	Best Fantasy Film	Jack the Giant Slayer	Nominated	

=== Home media ===
In April 2013, Warner Home Video announced the release of Jack the Giant Slayer on Blu-ray 3D, Blu-ray Disc and DVD. The discs were released on June 18, 2013, in two editions; a three-disc 3D/Blu-ray/DVD combo pack, and a two-disc Blu-ray/DVD combo pack. Both sets include the "Become a Giant Slayer" featurette, deleted scenes, a gag reel and a digital copy of the film.
