= 1999 New York Underground Film Festival =

These are the films shown at the 6th New York Underground Film Festival, held from March 10–14, 1999

Film Name	Director	Type	Length	Notes
10 Beers in 10 Minutes	Jesse Sugarman & Mike Long	Experimental Video	12:00	
A Domestic Hole	Gritt Uldall-Jessen	Short Video	7:00	
Alex the Clown Goes To Hell	Keith Schofield	Animation Video	2:00	
Balls Out!	Tara Spartz	Short 16mm	7:15	
Bang Bang	Jeff Scher	Experimental 16mm	6:00	
Beauty Knows No Pain	Dana Discordia	Documentary Video	23:00	
Birth of a Nation 1965	Alfred Leslie	Experimental 8mm/35mm on video	24:00	
Bite My Boohonkus	Xan Price	Short 16mm	16:00	
Bovine Vendetta	Bob Judd	Experimental Video	2:30	
Brainspotting	Colm Wood	Short 16mm	12:12	
Brothers	Paul Suderman	Short 16mm	14:00	
Bury Me in Kern County	Julien Nitzberg	Feature 16mm	90:00	New York Premiere
Chi Girl	Heidi Van Lier	Feature 35mm	88:00	New York Premiere
Cloven Hoofed	Dietmar Post	Short 16mm	12:00	
Crack	Jon Moritsugu	Short 16mm	0:45	
Crawley	Ben Edlund & Lisa Hammer	Short Super-8 on video	7:00	
Crudbucket	Mike Gaut	Documentary Video	66:00	New York Premiere
Culture	Ari Gold	Short 35mm	1:00	
Destroy All Mobsters	Duncan Reekie	Experimental Super-8 on video	10:00	
Devil Tour '94	John Geary	Documentary Video	3:00	
Do You Think I'm Creepy?	Jana Ritter	Short 16mm	9:00	
Do You Think I'm Creepy?	Jana Ritter	Short 16mm	9:00	
Dresden	Ben Speth	Feature 16mm	82:00	New York Premiere
Eat In	Mark Locke	Short 16mm	9:30	
Evil of Dracula	Martha Colburn	Animation Super-8 on 16mm	2:00	
Farewell to the Deuce (excerpts from work in progress)	June Lang	Video	6:00	
Fife Vanderplough, the Wild Naked Boy of the Lemondrop Forest	Glenn Ficarra	Short 16mm	8:40	
Films by Jeff Keen	Jeff Keen	Experimental Super-8 on video	5:00	
Fin	Gabriela Marti	Short 16mm	9:00	
Fishing for Brad	Nicole Koschmann	Experimental 35mm	6:15	
Footage of 42nd Street	June Lang & Jeffrey Arsenault	Super 8 on video	4:00	
Fun For Men!	Arn McConnel	Animation Video	13:00	
Gladys Nolen's House	Arthur Bradford	Documentary Video	28:00	
Goldfarb	Jeremy Saulnier	Short 16mm	15:00	
Gradually Going Gonzo	Jim Heneghan	Short 16mm/Video	4:00	
Graham Cracker Cream Pie	Huck Botko	Documentary Video	10:00	
Herd	Mike Mitchell	Short 16mm	17:00	
How's Your News?	Arthur Bradford	Documentary Super-8 / Video	28:00	
Human Error In The Mechanical Age	Paul Tarragó	Short Super-8	11:00	
I Created Lancelot Link	Jeff Krulik & Diane Bernard	Documentary Video	12:00	
Jaunt	Joey Kötting	Documentary 16mm on video	6:00	
Johnny Bagpipes	Todd Korgan	Short 16mm on video	12:12	
Junk	Roddy Bogawa	Feature 16mm	85:00	World Premiere
Kitty Porn	Angela Christlieb	Experimental 16mm	3:00	
Lady Rescue	Colette Rouhier	Short Video	4:00	
Lez B. Friends: A Biker Bitch Hate Story	Steak House & Aunti Lou	Experimental Video	20:00	
Life History of A Star	Jennifer Gentile	Short 16mm	13:30	
Lift-Off	Martha Colburn	Animation Super-8 on 16mm	3:00	
Liquids	Jimmy Mazzullo	Experimental 16mm/Video	17:00	
Looking for Mr. Cole Part One	Jennet Thomas	Experimental Video with performance	8:30	
Made In New York	Yongman Kim	Short 35mm	15:00	
Millennium Bug	Lee Lanier	Animation 35mm	1:24	
Mutantis	Enzo Mazzula	Experimental Super-8 /Video	13:00	
My Brother Cicero	Tony Nittoli	Short 16mm on video	28:00	
My Sister Story	Jessica Jennings	Documentary Video	21:07	
Nocturnu	Dennison Ramalho	Short 16mm	10:40	
Outlet	Robert Banks, Jr.	Experimental 35mm	3:30	
Pervert in our Pool	Martha Colburn	Animation Super-8 on 16mm	3:00	
Phi-Brite	Jeff Koone	Animation 16mm	2:30	
Pig	Nico B & Rozz Williams	Experimental 16mm	23:00	
Pop	Thomas Zagrosek	Experimental Video	2:30	
Pranks!	Jesse Brown & Morgwn Rimel	Documentary Video	13:00	
Puberty: Benji's Special Time	Luke Fannin	Short 16mm	16:30	
Puke	Matthew Harrison	Short Super-8	4:00	
Racecar	Adam Schecter & Jesse Brown	Animation Video	1:00	
Radiation	Suki Hawley & Michael Galinsky	Feature 16mm	85:00	New York Premiere
Random Acts of Intimacy	Clio Barnard	Documentary 16mm	15:00	
Rape of the Arthuropods	Arthur Lager	Short Super-8 on video	3:00	
Red, White and Yellow	Mark Littman & Marshall Dostal	Documentary 16mm	80:00	
Release	Brant Sersen	Documentary Video	65:00	World Premiere
Revelation	S.M.X.	Experimental Super-8/Video	1:26	
Roadhead	Bob Sabiston	Documentary 35mm	14:00	
Sadisinfectenz	Giulia Frati	Experimental 16mm	1:58	
She-Beast: Greatest Hits from her Films	Julie Cavello	Short 16mm	8:00	
Shine on Sweet Starlet (EXCERPTS)	John Michael McCarthy	Documentary Super-8 on video	6:00	
Sin City Stopless	Richard Less & Johnny LaTrene	Documentary Video	2:00	
Sleep	Peter Calvin	Feature 16mm	103:00	World Premiere
Sodom and Gomorrha	Rudy Burckhardt	16mm	5:00	
Split	Erik Deutschman	Experimental 16mm	12:00	
Square Times	Rudy Burckhardt	16mm	5:00	
Strange Parallel	Steve Hanft	Documentary 16mm	28:30	
Synergy	Valerian Bennett	Documentary 16mm	60:00	New York Premiere
Tattu	Terry Roethlein	Experimental Super-8	14:42	
The Acid House	Paul McGuigan	Feature 35mm	106:00	US Premiere
The Acid King	Brian Tane	Documentary Video	5:20	
The Atrocity Exhibition	Jonathan Weiss	Feature 35mm/Video	105:00	New York Premiere
The Bats	Jim Trainor	Animation 16mm	8:00	
The Dance of Death	Lisa Hammer (aka Blessed Elysium)	Short Video	3:00	
The Dolls House	Scott Flockhart	Short 16mm on video	7:00	
The Fall of Communism as Seen in Gay Pornography	William E. Jones	Experimental Video	20:00	
The Gods of Times Square	Richard Sandler	Documentary Video	103:00	New York Premiere
The Great Coagulator!	Geoffrey Chadwick	Short 16mm	8:00	
The Kinsey 3	Angela Robinson	Short 16mm	12:00	
The Last Clean Shirt	Alfred Leslie	Experimental 35mm	39:00	
The Magician	Tommy Turner	Experimental Super-8	10:00	
The Psychotic Odyssey of Richard Chase	Carey Burtt	Short 16mm	6:00	
The Tony Montana School of Business	Langdon Doty	Short Video	8:23	
The Trip Back—Strangers With Candy: The Lost Episode	Adam Bernstein	Short 16mm	22:00	
The Trouble With Perpetual Deja-Vu	Todd Verow	Feature Video	80:00	World Premiere
Three Days	Carter Smith & Kevin Ford	Documentary 35mm/16mm/Super-8/Video	94:00	New York Premiere
Tiny Sun-Bathers	Olivier Boulanger & Martin Koscielniak	Animation 35mm	2:05	
True Gore	Monte Cazazza & Matthew Causey	Documentary Video	75:00	
TV Ministry	Mark Hejnar	Documentary Video	11:00	
Un Ga Nai - Bad Luck	Christophe Draeger & Martin Frei	Documentary Super-8/Video	40:00	
Under Chad Valley	Jeffrey Erbach	Experimental 35mm	8:00	
Wake	Albert Meycir	Animation 16mm	3:15	
Welcome	James Brett	Experimental 35mm	10:00	
What's Convenient?	Jane Gang	Experimental Super-8	3:00	
What's On?	Martha Colburn	Animation Super-8 on 16mm	1:45	
Wheels of Fury	Dan Dinello, Paul Dinello & Mitch Rouse	Short 16mm	14:00	
Xavier	Todd Lincoln	Short 16mm on video	6:00	

== See also ==
- New York Underground Film Festival site
- 1999 Festival Archive
