= Lion's Den (1988 film) =

1988 short film by Bryan Singer

- Directed by: Bryan Singer; John Ottman
- Written by: Bryan Singer
- Produced by: Bryan Singer; Anthony Miller
- Starring: Ethan Hawke; Bryan Singer; Brandon Keith; Dylan Kussman; David Leslie Conhaim
- Cinematography: John B. Aronson
- Edited by: John Ottman
- Music by: Trevor Rhodes
- Release date: 1988
- Running time: 25 minutes
- Country: United States
- Language: English

Lion's Den is a 1988 short film directed by Bryan Singer and John Ottman. It marks Singer's first film as a director. The film is about five men who meet up at their old hang-out spot (called the Lion's Den) after finishing their first semester of college. The film is 25 minutes in length. Ethan Hawke, who had known Bryan Singer as a child in New Jersey, agreed to star in it at the same time that he was filming Dad with Jack Lemmon. Ottman also edited the film.

== Cast ==
- Bryan Singer as Michael
- Susan Kussman as Cathy
- Ethan Hawke as Chris
- Dylan Kussman as Kyle
- Brandon Keith as Darren
- David Leslie Conhaim as Dean
- Jim Napoli as Costumer
- Anthony Miller as Diner Chef
