= Ten 'til Noon =

- Promotional poster
- Directed by: Scott Storm
- Written by: Paul Osborne
- Starring: Alfonso Freeman; Rick D. Wasserman; Rayne Guest; Jenya Lano; Thomas Kopache
- Cinematography: Alice Brooks
- Edited by: Kalman Alexander; Scott Storm
- Music by: Joe Kraemer
- Production companies: Shut Up & Shoot Pictures
- Distributed by: Radio London Films
- Release date: February 3, 2006 (San Francisco Independent Film Festival)
- Running time: 88 minutes
- Country: United States
- Language: English
- Budget: $750,000

Ten 'Til Noon is a 2006 crime thriller directed by Scott Storm and starring Alfonso Freeman, Rick D. Wasserman, Rayne Guest, Jenya Lano, and Thomas Kopache. It was produced by Michael Creighton Rogers, Michael Mannheim, Gavin Franks, and Brian Osborne.

The film depicts the same ten minutes between 11:50am and 12 noon, during which time a crime is committed, from the perspective of ten different characters. It was filmed on a shoestring budget over the course of several months.

After a premiere screening in Los Angeles, Jon Voight's company, Crystal Sky, bought foreign and domestic distribution rights to the film, and it opened theatrically in Los Angeles on March 30, 2007. The film won awards at the San Francisco Independent Film Festival, San Diego Film Festival, and Newport Beach Film Festival.
