= Chi Girl =

1999 American mockumentary

- Directed by: Heidi Van Lier
- Written by: Heidi Van Lier
- Produced by: Michael Blaha; Heidi Van Lier
- Starring: Heidi Van Lier; Joe Kraemer
- Cinematography: Anders Uhl
- Edited by: Paul Gordon
- Music by: Joe Kraemer
- Distributed by: TriShore Entertainment
- Release date: 1999
- Running time: 87 minutes
- Country: United States
- Language: English

Chi Girl is a 1999 black-and-white mockumentary produced, directed, written by, and starring Heidi Van Lier. The story follows Heather, an unlikable woman who makes a bet with a filmmaker that she can sleep with any man she wants at any time. The film was shown at a number of film festivals including Slamdance Film Festival, Cleveland International Film Festival, New York Underground Film Festival, Edinburgh International Film Festival, and Chicago Alt.film Festival. Chi Girl was low-budget and was made on less than $50,000, which Van Lier borrowed from her mother.

== Synopsis ==
Heather Green (Van Lier) is a Chicago newspaper columnist who makes a bet with a filmmaker, Randy, that she can sleep with any man she wants, whenever she wants because she theorizes that all men crave sex. Randy films her unsuccessful attempts to prove her theory right, as well as her stalking her ex-boyfriend. Over the course of the movie, Randy begins to fall in love with Heather. When Heather finds a boyfriend, Cliff, and tells Randy filming is over, he begins to stalk her. She repeatedly tells him to leave her alone. Heather once again allows Randy to film after Cliff breaks up with her but this time he has to record without sound. At the end of the movie, Heather boards a train to an unknown destination. Randy watches her leave and decides to wait for her return.

== Cast ==
- Heidi Van Lier as Heather Green
- Joe Kraemer as Randy (voice)
- Scott Benjaminson as Cliff
- Phil Smith as Jack
- Alicia Hyde as Marie
- Sarah Willis as Kelly
- Troy West as Jeff
- Bret Grafton as Jacob
- Jill Kraft as Michelle
- Paul Jeans as George
- Cherise Silvestri as a Jennie
- Stephanie Caterer as a Jennie
- Erinn Haynes as a Jennie

== Accolades ==
Year	Award	Presenting Body	Notes	Ref
1999	Grand Jury Prize	Slamdance Film Festival		
1999	Best Director	Chicago Alt.Film Fest	Heidi Van Lier	
