= Richard Sandler =

American photographer and filmmaker

Richard Sandler (born 1946) is an American street photographer and documentary filmmaker who has made work in New York City.

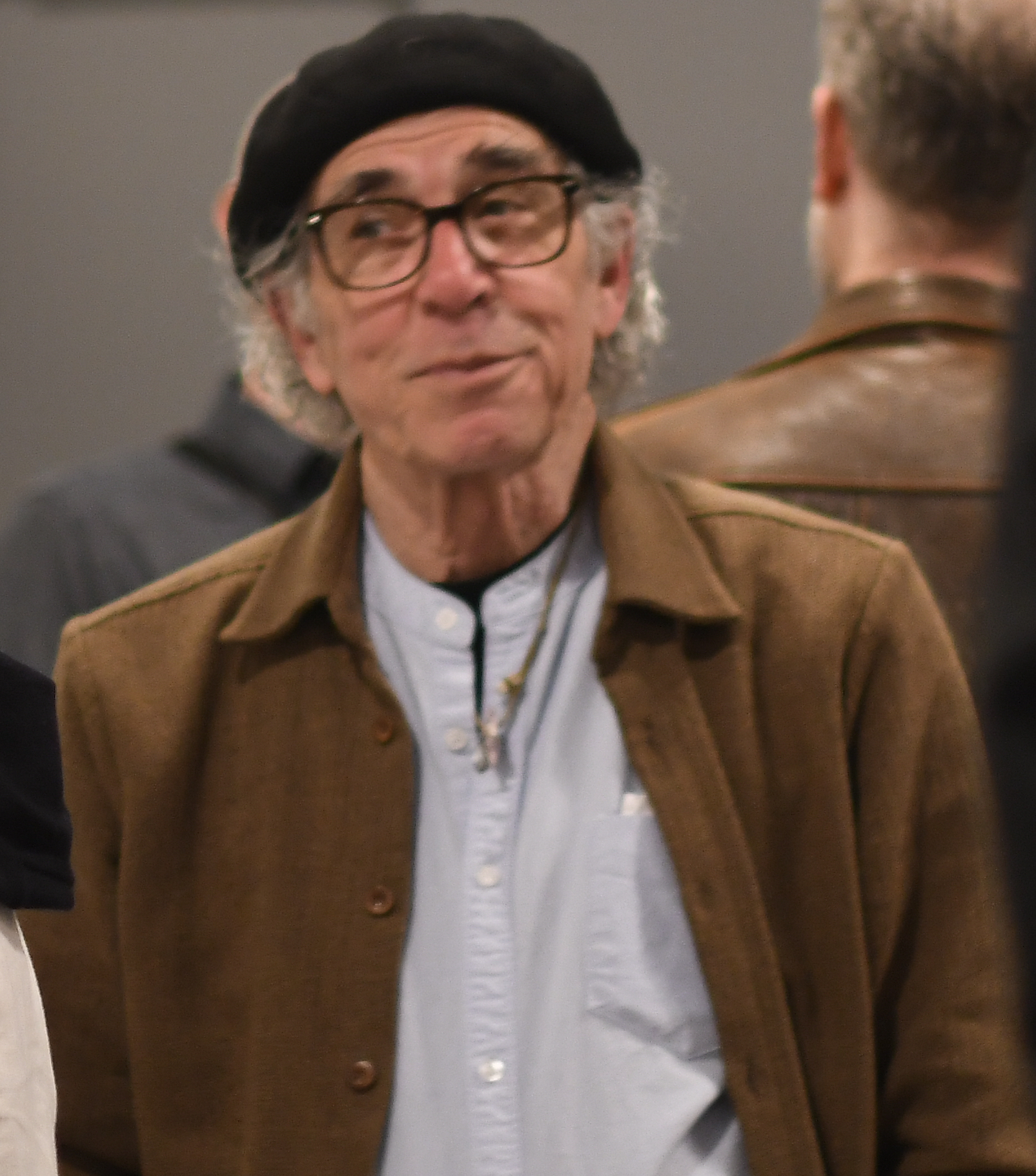
Richard Sandler in Vancouver Canada.

His photographs have been published in The Eyes of the City (2016) and are held in the collections of Brooklyn Museum and the Museum of Fine Arts, Houston. His films include The Gods of Times Square (1999), Brave New York (2004), and Radioactive City (2011). He has received a Guggenheim Fellowship for filmmaking.

== Life and work ==
Sandler grew up in Forest Hills, Queens, New York City. In 1968, he moved to Boston to work as a macrobiotic chef, and later as an acupuncturist. At some point he boarded with motivational psychologist David McClelland and his wife Mary. "Mary gave Sandler her Leica 3F in 1977 and taught him how to develop film in their basement darkroom." That year he began making photographs on the streets of Boston, which led to him working as a photojournalist. Three years later he moved back to New York City where he continued to make street photographs until September 11, 2001. Sandler had begun making films in New York in the early 1990s and after 9/11 he switched from photography to filmmaking, producing a series of free-form documentaries.

His book, The Eyes of the City (2016), contains photographs made between 1977 and the weeks before 9/11 in New York and Boston, with most from between 1977 and 1992 in New York, and several from Boston.

Sandler's work was featured in a retrospective exhibition at the Bronx Documentary Center in New York City from February 11 to March 26, 2023.

== Publications ==
- The Eyes of the City. Brooklyn, NY: powerHouse, 2016. With a foreword by David Isay and an afterword by Jonathan Ames. ISBN 9781576877876.

== Films ==
Sandler directed and produced the following documentaries:

- The Gods of Times Square (1999)
- Brave New York (2004)
- Sway (2006)
- Everybody Is Hurting (2006)
- The Rocks of Eternity: Conversations with Satish Kumar (2007)
- Forever and Sunsmell (2010)
- Radioactive City (2011)

== Exhibitions ==
- The Eyes of the City, a retrospective, the Bronx Documentary Center, New York City, February 11 – March 26, 2023

== Awards ==
- 2006: Guggenheim Fellowship from the John Simon Guggenheim Memorial Foundation for filmmaking

== Collections ==
Sandler's work is held in the following permanent collections:

- Brooklyn Museum, Brooklyn, New York: 2 prints (as of 3 October 2022)
- Museum of Fine Arts, Houston, Texas: 1 print1 (as of 3 October 2022)
