= Public Access (1993 film) =

- Film poster
- Directed by: Bryan Singer
- Written by: Bryan Singer; Christopher McQuarrie; Michael Feit Dougan
- Produced by: Kenneth Kokin
- Cinematography: Bruce Douglas Johnson
- Edited by: John Ottman
- Music by: John Ottman
- Production companies: Occidental Studios; Cinemabeam
- Release date: January 1993
- Running time: 90 minutes
- Country: United States
- Language: English
- Budget: US$250,000

Public Access is a 1993 American drama film directed by Bryan Singer in his feature film debut. Singer also wrote the screenplay with Christopher McQuarrie and Michael Feit Dougan. The film was shot in 18 days for US$250,000. It was screened at the 1993 Sundance Film Festival, where it was a joint winner of the Grand Jury Prize. Critics praised the technical direction of Public Access, but did not lend similar praise to the film's story and the characters.

== Plot ==
A clean-cut drifter ends up in a small town called Brewster. Getting wind of the local public-access television cable TV station, the man decides to host his own show called Our Town, which becomes a focal point for town citizens to call in and voice their problems anonymously. However, things start to get ugly and tensions rise for the show, which begins to elevate the man's signature catchphrase "What's wrong with Brewster?" into an entirely new subject for the people of Brewster, when the town becomes embroiled in a mess it has created, driven by a man whose intentions might be far more sinister than he appears to be.

== Cast ==
- Ron Marquette as Whiley Pritcher
- Dina Brooks as Rachel
- Bert Williams as Bob Hodges
- Larry Maxwell as Jeff Abernathy
- Charles Kavanaugh as Mayor Breyer
- Brandon Boyce as Kevin Havey
- Margaret Kerry as Marge
- Randall Slavin as Pudd
- Liz Dilts as Lisa
- Mark Norling as Lyle Macintosh
- Jason Varlance as Tray

== Production ==
Bryan Singer, Christopher McQuarrie, and Michael Feit Dougan wrote the screenplay for Public Access. Singer directed the screenplay in 1992 on a budget of $250,000 and with a schedule of 18 days. The crew used leftover film stock from Bram Stoker's Dracula and Hoffa. The director recalled the production experience: "Chris and I look at that film and wince a little. Part of our reaction is, 'Wow, look what we did then. It was so small and undeveloped.' Part of it is reliving the circumstances of the days we filmed each scene. This production was fraught with 100 times more turmoil than Usual Suspects—every day was a crisis. And then we also feel very nostalgic about it." Singer compared Public Access's themes to his follow-up film The Usual Suspects: "The two films are similar in the notion of things not always being what they seem. They're also about audiences' projections on a stranger. In many ways, Verbal in The Usual Suspects is an extension of Whiley, by being a foil for our projections. Both films are about telling stories and provoking, which segues into my style—using sound and images and music to create tension."

== Reception ==
When Public Access screened at the 1993 Sundance Film Festival, it was one of the two films to win the Grand Jury Prize in dramatic competition, sharing the award with Ruby in Paradise. It also screened at the 1993 Florida Film Festival and won the Audience Award for best feature film. Despite the recognition, the film did not secure a theatrical distributor.

Variety called Public Access a "technically proficient" film considering its small budget and schedule. The trade paper observed: "What Singer and his co-scenarists seem to be getting at is a critique of Reagan-era greed, hypocrisy and antihumanism, as well as a commentary on the power of the media and its ability to distract the public from issues with attractive surfaces." It summarized: "This very low-budget study of malaise lurking beneath the tranquil surface of a typical small American town is serious-minded and bounces around some provocative ideas, but is vague about important matters such as key story points, motivation and overriding theme." Newsweek wrote: "The 27-year-old Singer's a real talent, but the moody Public Access needed a stronger script. After an intriguing buildup, in which a mysterious stranger enters a small town and stirs up trouble on public-access TV, the story self-destructs."

Time Out Film Guide described Public Access as "this chilly little parable [that] taps into the poisonous well-springs of the middle-American psyche". The magazine went on: "The film is overly measured, with lots of slow zooms and slow motion (even the actors seem to be on go-slow), but it's engrossing, and Marquette [who plays Whiley Pritcher] is a genuinely scary customer, a dry-cleaned all-American sociopath." In contrast, The Hollywood Reporter's Henry Sheehan wrote of Public Access as "a virtuosically stylish independent feature that is as full of flourishes as it is devoid of meaning". Sheehan found the film "visually... ingenious" and that the soundtrack had "an inventive sophistication". Despite the highlights, he felt that Public Access's characters were "mere exigencies" and that the film could be "in the service of a more coherent or articulate story".

Awards
Preceded by In the Soup	Sundance Grand Jury Prize: U.S. Dramatic; 1993 tied with Ruby in Paradise	Succeeded by What Happened Was
