= Christopher McQuarrie =

American filmmaker (born 1968)

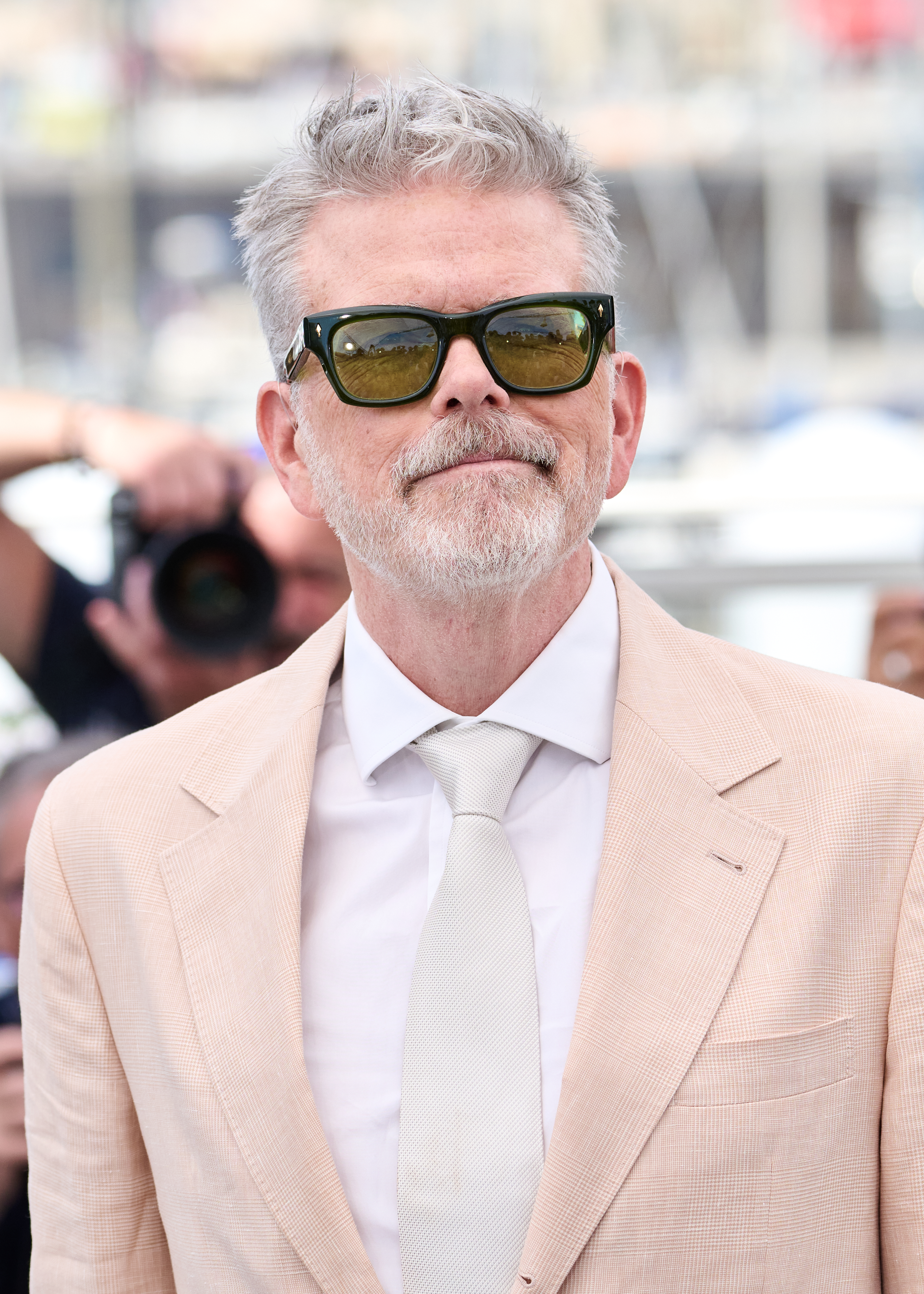
- McQuarrie in 2025
- Born: October 25, 1968 (age 58); Princeton, New Jersey, U.S.
- Other name: McQ
- Occupations: Screenwriter; director; producer
- Years active: 1993–present
- Spouse: Heather Neely (m. 2000)
- Children: 2

Christopher McQuarrie (born October 25, 1968) is an American filmmaker. He received the BAFTA Award, Independent Spirit Award, and Academy Award for Best Original Screenplay for the neo-noir mystery film The Usual Suspects (1995). He made his directorial debut with the crime thriller film The Way of the Gun (2000).

McQuarrie is a frequent collaborator with Tom Cruise, having written and directed the action film Jack Reacher (2012), as well as four installments of the Mission: Impossible film series: Rogue Nation (2015), Fallout (2018), Dead Reckoning (2023), and The Final Reckoning (2025), in addition to uncredited rewrites on Ghost Protocol (2011). He was also a part of the writing and/or producing team on the Cruise films Valkyrie (2008), Edge of Tomorrow (2014), Jack Reacher: Never Go Back (2016), The Mummy (2017), and Top Gun: Maverick (2022), the last of which received Academy Award nominations for Best Adapted Screenplay and Best Picture.

== Early life ==
McQuarrie was born in Princeton, New Jersey. After graduating from West Windsor-Plainsboro High School South in 1986, he worked as an assistant at Christ Church Grammar School in Perth, Western Australia, recalling in 2013, "I was offered an Interim program ... I picked a place out of a hat and ended up at Christ Church Grammar School. I lived at the school and worked at the boarding school, though I did very little work". Fired after nine months, "I hitchhiked for three months, came home, knocked around for about a month and then immediately started working for this detective agency.... [It] was actually a glorified security-guard position. I think in the four years I worked there I did about six investigations."

McQuarrie worked for four years at a movie theater in New Jersey as a security guard. Because the theater was in a violent area, he was often tasked to stand at the back of the room and observe the audience as they were watching the film, ensuring no fights broke out. He described the experience as "[his] film school" and "the single most educational experience [he] ever had," stating that it helped him "develop an innate sense of how the audience is responding" to a film.

== Career ==
=== 1993–2000: Early films and Oscar win ===
McQuarrie's first feature film was the 1993 thriller Public Access, directed by Bryan Singer and produced by Kenneth Kokin. It won the Critics Award at the Deauville American Film Festival and shared the Sundance Film Festival's Grand Jury Prize. It was not released theatrically in the United States. On review aggregator Rotten Tomatoes, it received an approval rating of 58%.

McQuarrie wrote The Usual Suspects (1995), for which he received Best Screenplay awards from the British and American Academy Awards, as well as from Premiere magazine, the Texas Board of Review, and the Chicago Critics, as well as the Edgar Award and Independent Spirit Award. It was later included on the New York Times list of the 1000 greatest films ever made, and the character Verbal Kint was included on AFI's list of the 100 greatest Heroes and Villains of all time. In 2006, the Writers Guild of America voted The Usual Suspects #35 on their list of 101 Greatest Screenplays. In his third collaboration with Singer, McQuarrie did an extensive rewrite on X-Men, but ultimately removed his name from the project.

In 2000, McQuarrie made his directorial debut with The Way of the Gun, a modern-day Western, for which he also wrote the script and was produced by Kenneth Kokin. It starred Benicio del Toro, Ryan Phillippe, Taye Diggs, and James Caan. The film, budgeted at US$9.5 million, received mixed reviews and grossed US$16 million worldwide.

=== 2008–2013: Further writing, producing ===
McQuarrie first met frequent collaborator Tom Cruise, seeking simply to unload a screenplay in order to pay his debts and exit the film industry. This screenplay, co-written with Nathan Alexander, later turned into Valkyrie, which opened on December 25, 2008, and would also be the first film where McQuarrie served as a producer. The film is based on the real-life July 20, 1944 plot to assassinate Adolf Hitler. While researching the screenplay, the writers had access to members of the Stauffenberg family; consulted a book written by Fabian von Schlabrendorff, a conspirator who survived; and spoke with Hitler's surviving bodyguard. The film, directed by Bryan Singer, received the BMI Film Music Award and the Bambi Award for Courage. McQuarrie initially only took a producing credit on the film for its associated pay increase. But, after a conversation with Paula Wagner, whose increased commitments with United Artists left little time for creative collaboration with Cruise, he decided to fully involve himself in the film's production, as well as replace Wagner as Cruise's primary creative partner.

In 2009, McQuarrie was hired to pen the script for the then-untitled The Wolverine. He also co-wrote the 2010 film The Tourist with Julian Fellowes, Jeffrey Nachmanoff and director Florian Henckel von Donnersmarck. It starred Johnny Depp and Angelina Jolie and grossed US$278 million worldwide. It received three Golden Globe Award nominations and several other awards, among them the Redbox Movie Award for the most rented drama of 2011. McQuarrie then provided uncredited rewrites on the 2011 action spy film Mission: Impossible – Ghost Protocol during the film's production.

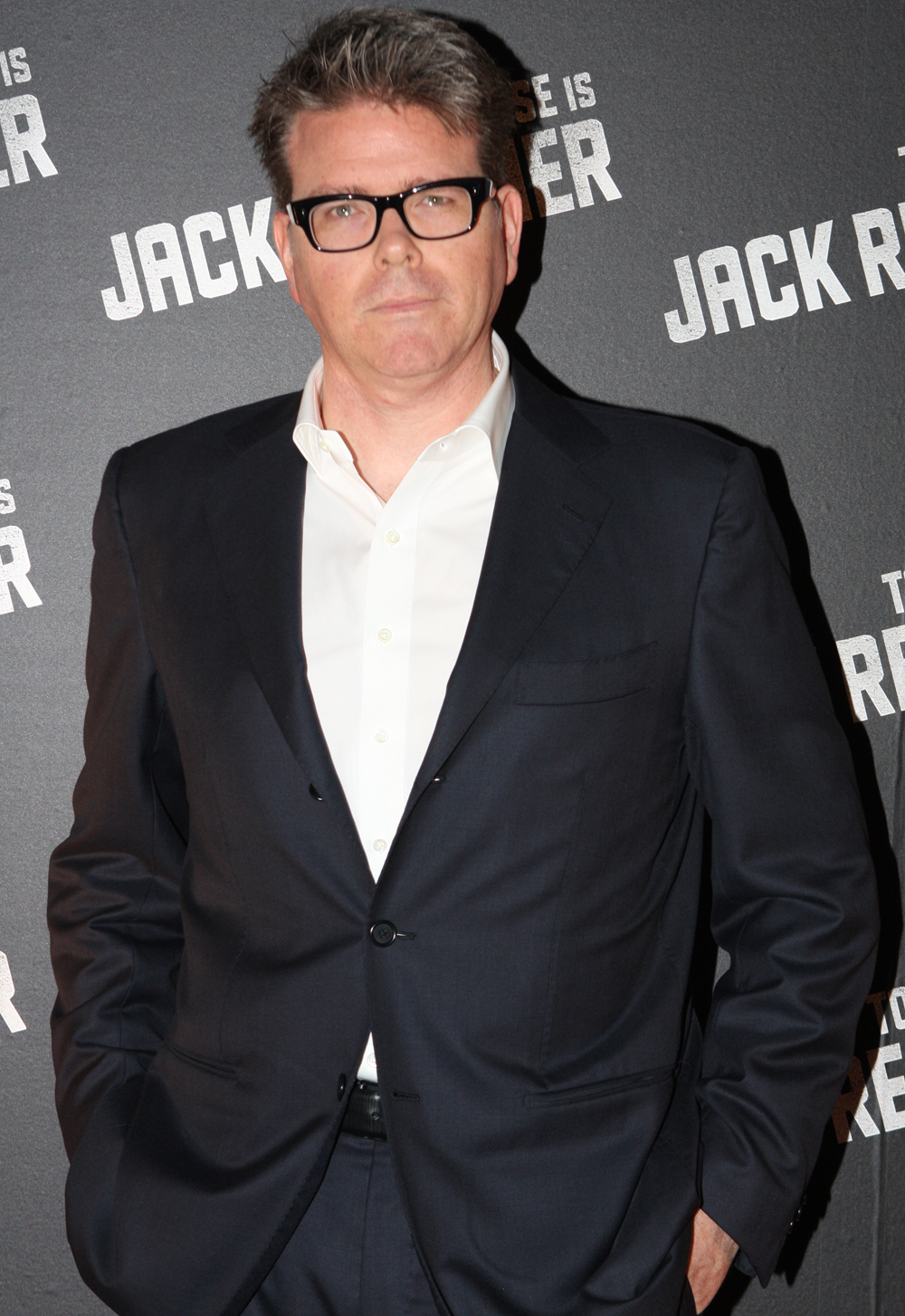
McQuarrie at premiere of Jack Reacher in 2012

In 2011, McQuarrie directed his second feature, Jack Reacher, an adaptation of One Shot, the ninth in the series of 21 Jack Reacher novels by Lee Child. Filming began in the Pittsburgh metropolitan area on October 3, 2011, and continued through the end of January 2012. The movie was released in December 2012 by Paramount Pictures. In 2012, McQuarrie stepped in to rewrite the script for World War Z after Drew Goddard and Damon Lindelof left the film.

2013 saw the release of McQuarrie's fourth collaboration with Singer, Jack the Giant Slayer, co-written by McQuarrie. Critical reviews were mixed, and it was a box office failure, grossing only US$198 million against an estimated US$240 million budget (excluding promotion). McQuarrie co-wrote the 2014 science fiction action thriller Edge of Tomorrow with Jez and John-Henry Butterworth, based on the Japanese novel All You Need Is Kill.

=== 2014–present: Mission: Impossible and more ===
Tom Cruise had called McQuarrie "the uncredited hero" of MI: Ghost Protocol and told Paramount CEO in 2014 that he wanted McQuarrie as the director for Mission: Impossible – Rogue Nation. It was McQuarrie's third feature as director and he co-wrote it with Drew Pearce. It received strong reviews, grossed over US$195 million at the North American box office, and won a Golden Tomato for Best Action-Adventure Movie of 2015.

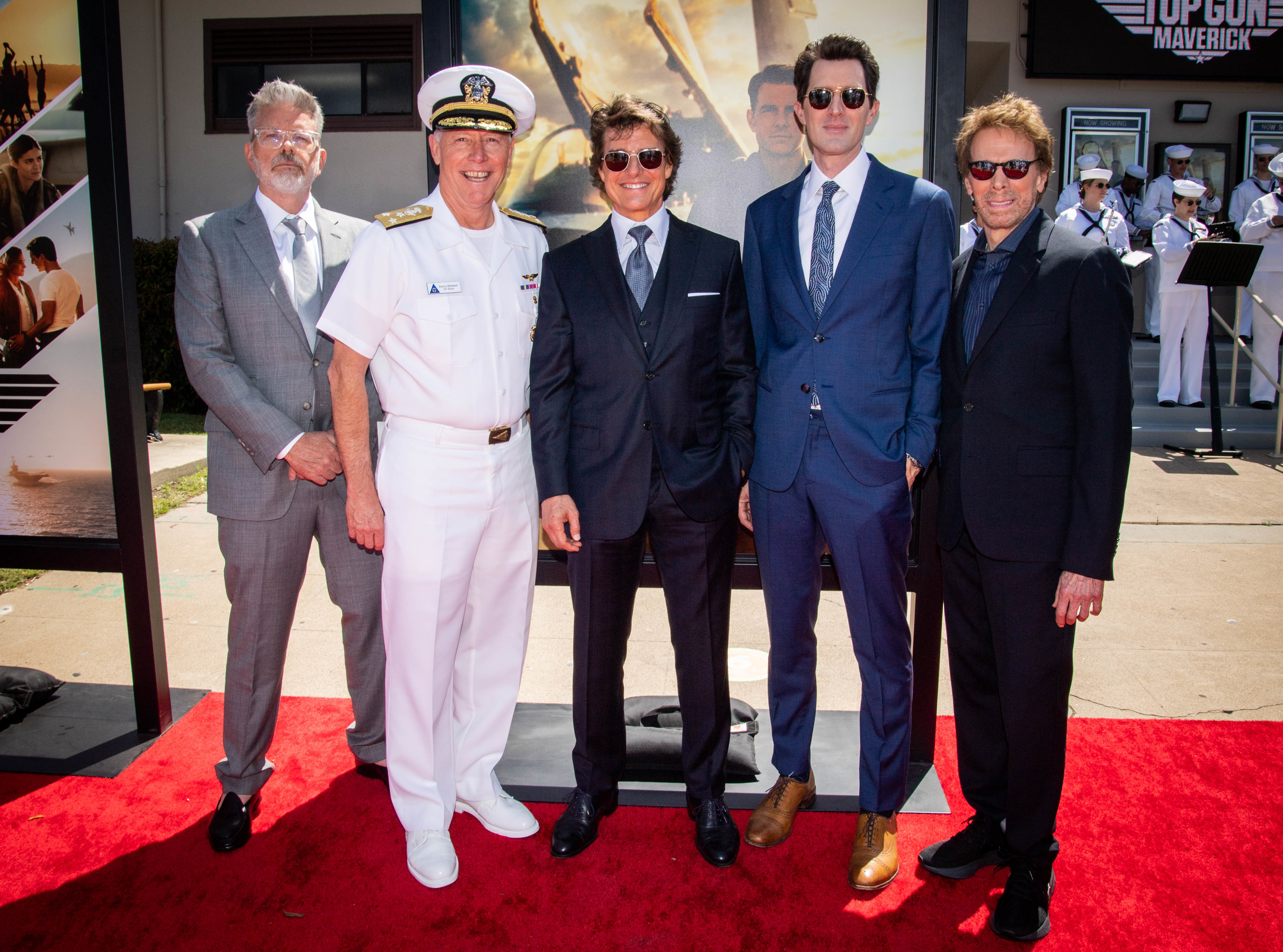
McQuarrie, Kenneth R. Whitesell, Tom Cruise, Joseph Kosinski, and Jerry Bruckheimer at the premiere of Top Gun: Maverick at Naval Air Station North Island

By October 2015, McQuarrie completed a rewrite of Rogue One: A Star Wars Story and spent two weeks "tightening up the story". McQuarrie and screenwriter Dylan Kussman were commissioned by Tom Cruise to write a new script for The Mummy.

In November 2015, McQuarrie confirmed he would return to write and direct the sixth Mission: Impossible film, his third directing collaboration with Tom Cruise. The film, titled Mission: Impossible – Fallout, was released in the United States on July 27, 2018. It received strong reviews from critics, and grossed over $791 million worldwide, becoming the franchise's highest-grossing title.

McQuarrie pitched a sequel to Man of Steel after working with Superman actor Henry Cavill on Fallout that would have tied into a Green Lantern movie McQuarrie also proposed, although Warner Bros. rejected both ideas. McQuarrie and Cruise collaborated again on Top Gun: Maverick, for which McQuarrie co-wrote the screenplay and produced the film.

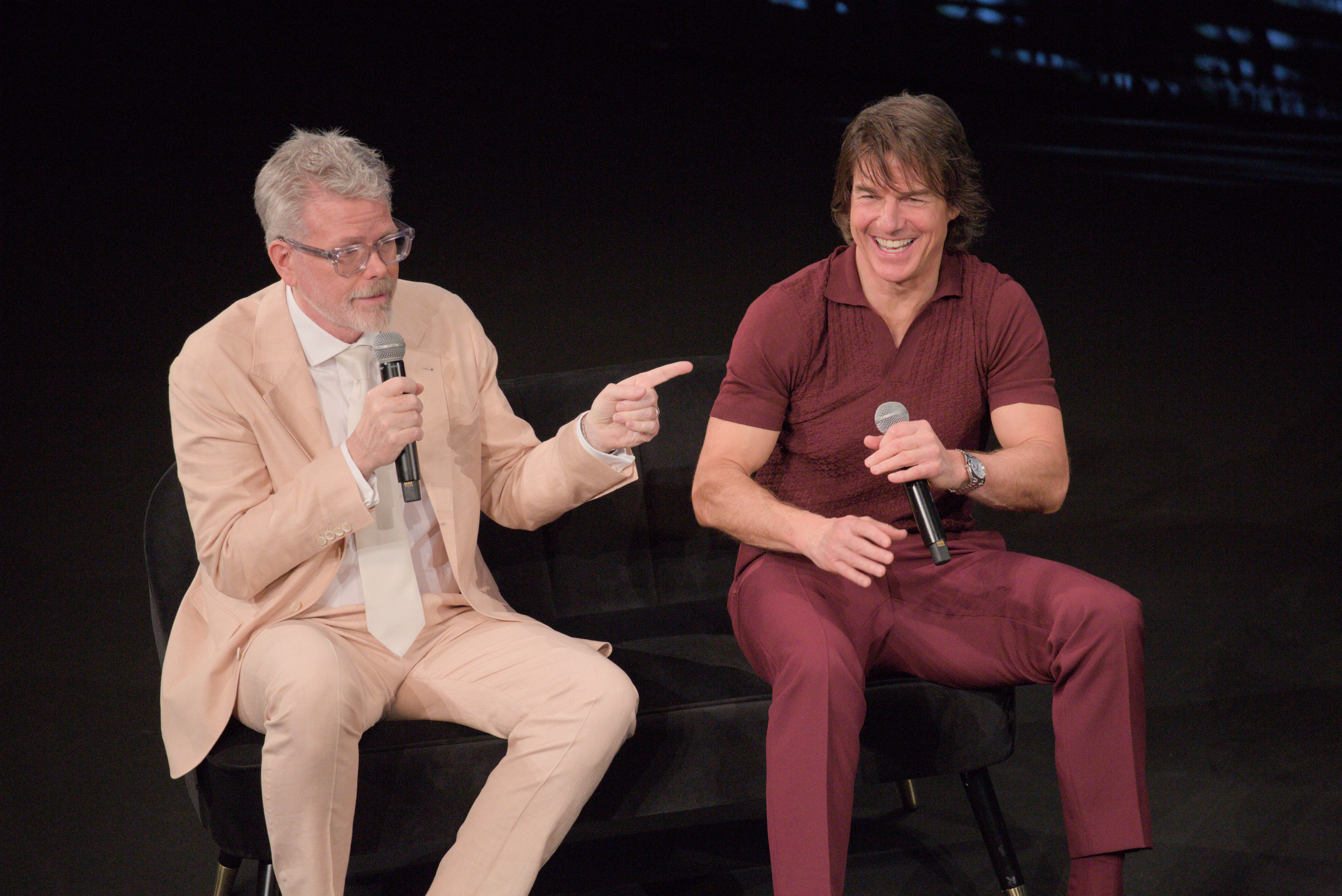
McQuarrie and Tom Cruise at the 2025 Cannes Film Festival

Initially hesitant to return to the franchise, McQuarrie finalized a deal to write and direct Mission: Impossible – Dead Reckoning Part One and Mission: Impossible – The Final Reckoning in January 2019. Dead Reckoning Part One was released on July 12, 2023, while The Final Reckoning was released on May 23, 2025. Ahead of the latter's release, McQuarrie was honored with a Director of the Year award at the 2025 CinemaCon, which was presented to him by Tom Cruise.

=== Upcoming projects ===
In August 2022, McQuarrie announced on the Light the Fuse podcast that he was developing a new project with Tom Cruise, to be co-written by Erik Jendresen, which he claimed would be "gnarlier" than the Mission: Impossible films and described as being "something we've talked about for a really long time. It's way outside of what you're used to seeing Tom do." A few days later, it was announced he and Cruise were also developing an original musical as a star vehicle for Cruise, as well as eyeing a potential project for Cruise to reprise the role of Les Grossman from Tropic Thunder, though it was unknown if Grossman would receive his own film or be included in the other films.

Although the Reacher franchise has migrated to television, McQuarrie and Cruise are continuing to develop a Reacher-like thriller film.

== Personal life ==
McQuarrie married producer Heather Neely after she worked as a costume designer on his directorial debut The Way of the Gun (2000). The pair now have two daughters.

McQuarrie served as Victoria Mahoney's mentor at the Sundance Screenwriters Lab. He struggles with hearing loss caused by congenital damage in his middle ear, which requires him to wear hearing aids. He has difficulties with focus and at one point tried ADHD medication, though he did not pursue it.

== Filmography ==
=== Feature film ===
Year	Title	Director	Writer	Producer
2000	The Way of the Gun	Yes	Yes	No
2012	Jack Reacher	Yes	Yes	No
2015	Mission: Impossible – Rogue Nation	Yes	Yes	No
2018	Mission: Impossible – Fallout	Yes	Yes	Yes
2023	Mission: Impossible – Dead Reckoning	Yes	Yes	Yes
2025	Mission: Impossible – The Final Reckoning	Yes	Yes	Yes
2027	Compassionate Release	Yes	No	Yes

==== Writer and producer ====
Year	Title	Writer	Producer
1993	Public Access	Yes	No
1995	The Usual Suspects	Yes	No
2008	Valkyrie	Yes	Yes
2010	The Tourist	Yes	No
2013	Jack the Giant Slayer	Yes	No
2014	Edge of Tomorrow	Yes	No
2016	Jack Reacher: Never Go Back	No	Yes
2017	The Mummy	Yes	No
2022	Top Gun: Maverick	Yes	Yes

Uncredited writing work

- Batman & Robin (1997)
- X-Men (2000)
- Ghost Ship (2002)
- Mission: Impossible – Ghost Protocol (2011)
- World War Z (2013)
- The Wolverine (2013)
- Rogue One (2016)

=== Television ===
Year	Title	Writer	Executive producer	Notes
1994	NYPD Blue	Story	No	Episode: "The Final Adjustment"
2010	Persons Unknown	Yes	Yes	Creator and executive producer (13 episodes) / Writer (Episode: "Pilot")

== Awards and nominations ==
Award	Year	Category	Title	Result
Sundance Film Festival	1993	Grand Jury Prize	Public Access	Won
Academy Awards	1995	Best Original Screenplay	The Usual Suspects	Won
BAFTA Awards	1995	Best Original Screenplay	The Usual Suspects	Won
Independent Spirit Awards	1995	Best Screenplay	The Usual Suspects	Won
Edgar Awards	1995	Best Motion Picture	The Usual Suspects	Won
Hugo Award	2014	Best Dramatic Presentation	Edge of Tomorrow	Nominated
Saturn Awards	2014	Best Writing	Edge of Tomorrow	Nominated
Golden Raspberry Awards	2017	Worst Screenplay	The Mummy	Nominated
Saturn Awards	2018	Best Writing	Mission: Impossible – Fallout	Nominated
Writers Guild of America Awards	2022	Best Adapted Screenplay	Top Gun: Maverick	Nominated
Academy Awards	2022	Best Picture	Top Gun: Maverick	Nominated
Academy Awards	2022	Best Adapted Screenplay	Top Gun: Maverick	Nominated
Satellite Awards	2022	Best Adapted Screenplay	Top Gun: Maverick	Nominated
Saturn Awards	2024	Best Writing	Mission: Impossible – Dead Reckoning Part One	Nominated
Saturn Awards	2026	Best Writing	Mission: Impossible – The Final Reckoning	Nominated
Saturn Awards	2026	Best Director	Mission: Impossible – The Final Reckoning	Nominated
Saturn Awards	2026	Visionary Award	Mission: Impossible – The Final Reckoning	Won

== See also ==
- Christopher McQuarrie's unrealized projects

== Bibliography ==
- McQuarrie, Christopher (2000). The Usual Suspects. London: Faber and Faber. ISBN 9780571203253. OCLC 42659852.
