= The Way of the Gun =

- Theatrical release poster
- Directed by: Christopher McQuarrie
- Written by: Christopher McQuarrie
- Produced by: Kenneth Kokin
- Starring: Ryan Phillippe; Benicio del Toro; Juliette Lewis; Taye Diggs; Nicky Katt; Scott Wilson; James Caan
- Cinematography: Dick Pope
- Edited by: Stephen Semel
- Music by: Joe Kraemer
- Production companies: Artisan Entertainment; Aqaba Productions
- Distributed by: Artisan Entertainment
- Release date: September 8, 2000
- Running time: 119 minutes
- Country: United States
- Language: English
- Budget: $8.5 million
- Box office: $13.1 million

The Way of the Gun is a 2000 American neo-Western crime drama film written and directed by Christopher McQuarrie in his directorial debut. Set in the Southwestern United States, the film follows two low-level criminals (Ryan Phillippe and Benicio del Toro) who kidnap a woman (Juliette Lewis) pregnant with the child of a mafia money launderer, only to find themselves facing a more complex and dangerous situation than they first realized. Taye Diggs, Nicky Katt, Scott Wilson, and James Caan play supporting roles.

The film was released on September 8, 2000, and was a minor commercial success, grossing $13 million against a production budget of $8.5 million. The critical reception was mixed, with some critics praising the acting, direction and action sequences, but criticizing the limits of the script, pacing and character development.

== Plot ==
Parker and Longbaugh are petty criminals from Illinois who travel to New Mexico hoping for the proverbial "big score." At a sperm donation clinic, the pair overhear a telephone conversation detailing a $1 million payment to a surrogate mother. They kidnap the heavily pregnant surrogate, Robin, resulting in a shootout with her bodyguards, Jeffers and Obecks, who are arrested. Longbaugh summons Robin's gynecologist, Dr. Allen Painter, to a truck stop to examine her, and he explains that she is carrying the child of money launderer Hale Chidduck and his wife, Francesca.

Jeffers and Obecks are bailed out by Chidduck's right-hand man, Joe Sarno, and Painter is revealed to be Chidduck's son. The kidnappers call from a motel south of the Mexican border, demanding that Chidduck send the doctor to deliver a $15 million ransom and induce labor. Francesca is having an affair with Jeffers, and overhears his and Obecks' plan to recover the baby but kill the kidnappers, Robin, and Painter, keeping the money for themselves.

Sarno approaches Longbaugh as Chidduck's "bagman", and Longbaugh declines $1 million to simply walk away but joins him for a cup of coffee. They commiserate about the state of their underworld professions, filled with characters who "want to be criminals more than they want to commit crimes", and guardedly go their separate ways, but Sarno leaves his associate Abner to watch the kidnappers. Robin reveals to Parker and Longbaugh that Francesca's embryo failed to implant, and Painter is actually the father of her child.

At the motel, Parker has second thoughts, but Robin seizes a shotgun and calls the police, forcing Parker and Longbaugh to flee. Mexican police arrive as Robin is confronted by Jeffers, Obecks, Painter, and Abner. As the officers hold everyone at gunpoint, Parker and Longbaugh open fire from a nearby hilltop, killing the officers and wounding Obecks, and Jeffers drives off with Painter and Robin. Parker and Longbaugh torture Obecks to reveal that Jeffers has taken Robin to a Mexican brothel, and a mortally wounded Abner notifies Sarno.

Jeffers forces Painter to perform a Caesarean section to retrieve the baby, despite Robin's confession that the child is not the Chidducks'. Parker and Longbaugh, heavily armed, storm the brothel, while Sarno arrives with his own men and stacks the ransom money in the courtyard outside. Painter shoots Jeffers, and Longbaugh has a change of heart at seeing Robin's condition, urging Parker that "She's had enough." Aware that the money is bait, Parker and Longbaugh charge headlong into an ambush.

Sarno's men are killed in the ensuing firefight, but Sarno shoots and cripples Parker and Longbaugh. An ambulance arrives as Painter emerges with Robin and the baby. The ambulance departs with Robin, Painter, their child, Sarno, and the money, leaving Parker and Longbaugh to die. Days later, Francesca reveals to her husband that she’s pregnant (possibly due to her affair with Jeffers).

== Cast ==
- Ryan Phillippe as Parker
- Benicio del Toro as Longbaugh
- Juliette Lewis as Robin
- James Caan as Joe Sarno
- Taye Diggs as Jeffers
- Nicky Katt as Obecks
- Geoffrey Lewis as Abner Mercer
- Dylan Kussman as Dr. Allen Painter
- Scott Wilson as Hale Chidduck
- Kristin Lehman as Francesca Chidduck
- Mando Guerrero as Federale
- Sarah Silverman as Raving Bitch

== Production ==
After winning an Academy Award for The Usual Suspects, Christopher McQuarrie assumed that he would have no problem making his next movie "and then you slowly start to realize no one in Hollywood is interested in making your film, they're interested in making their films." He spent years as a script doctor while trying to get financing for an epic biopic of Alexander the Great for Warner Bros. before finally realizing that he "had to make a film with some commercial success to be taken seriously." He approached 20th Century Fox and told them that he would be willing to write and direct a movie for any budget they would be willing to give him as long as he had complete creative control. "Fox told me to get fucked. No money. No control. No nothing. They didn't want my input, they just wanted me. For nothing."

Over coffee, Benicio del Toro asked McQuarrie why he had not made another crime film. McQuarrie replied that he did not want to be typecast as "a crime guy" but realized that he had nothing to lose, "unemployed and ready to make trouble". Del Toro convinced him to write a crime film on his own terms because he would get the least amount of interference from a studio. McQuarrie was interested in making a movie "that you can follow characters who don't go out of their way to ingratiate themselves to you, who aren't traditionally sympathetic."

McQuarrie started to write the script and "the first thing I did was to write a list of every taboo, everything I knew a cowardly executive would refuse to accept from a 'sympathetic' leading man." The first ten pages were a prologue, a trailer to another movie with Parker and Longbaugh (the real last names of Butch Cassidy and the Sundance Kid) and was "to be shot as slick and hip as possible, but with horrible, unspeakable acts of violence and degradation." During pre-production, McQuarrie realized that this was too extreme and cut it out. He and del Toro gave the script to several high-profile actors at the time all of whom turned them down. Ryan Phillippe wanted to change the direction of his career and "was besieged with choice offers, and we didn't want him, but he would not take no for an answer."

== Reception ==
=== Box office ===
The film opened at #9 at the North American box office making $2,150,979 in its opening weekend.

=== Critical response ===
On Rotten Tomatoes, the film has an approval rating of 46% based on 134 reviews, with an average rating of 5.50/10. The site's consensus reads: "Christopher McQuarrie may exhibit a way behind the camera in the stylish The Way of the Gun, but his script falters with dull characterization and a plot so needlessly twisty that most viewers will be ready to tune out before the final reveal." On Metacritic, the film has a score of 49 out of 100, sampled from 30 critic reviews, indicating "mixed or average reviews". Audiences surveyed by CinemaScore gave the film a grade of B− on a scale of A to F.

In his review for The New York Times, Elvis Mitchell wrote, "It's a song you've heard before, but each chord is hit with extraordinary concentration." Andy Seiler praised James Caan's performance in his review for USA Today, "To hear Caan menacingly intone 'I can promise you a day of reckoning you will not live long enough to never forget' is to remember why this man is a star." In his review for the Village Voice, J. Hoberman wrote, "Phillippe talks like Brando; Del Toro apes the body language. Nevertheless, James Caan steals the movie as a veteran tough guy, rotating his torso around some unseen truss." Entertainment Weekly gave the film a "B" rating and Owen Gleiberman wrote, "The Way of the Gun plays like an unusually ritzy festival circuit audition film, though McQuarrie, it must be said, aces the audition."

Roger Ebert of the Chicago Sun-Times gave the film two-and-a-half stars out of four and wrote, "McQuarrie pulls, pummels and pushes us, makes his characters jump through hoops, and at the end produces carloads of 'bag men' who have no other function than to pop up and be shot at ... Enough, already." In his review for Time, Richard Corliss criticized McQuarrie for devising, "a two-hour gunfight interrupted by questions of paternity. But he's not so hot as a director, so what aims at being terrifying is just loud and goofy." Peter Stack, in his review for San Francisco Chronicle, wrote, "The Way of the Gun attempts to be poetical Peckinpah, but it's a pointless exercise in gun violence with characterizations so thin they vaporize."

About the movie's reception, Christopher McQuarrie said: "I'm very proud of the film. Is the film flawed, is it uneven? Certainly. But it's sincere."

== Home media ==
The film was released on VHS, DVD and Blu-ray. To commemorate its 25th anniversary, Lionsgate released the film on 4K UHD Blu-ray on June 17, 2025.

== See also ==
- Tarantinoesque film
