= Kenneth Kokin =

Kenneth Kokin (Ken Kokin) is an American film producer, director, and executive.

== Education ==
Kokin attended the University of Southern California's cinema department.

== Production ==
Kokin served as a producer on Public Access (the winner of the Sundance Film Festival's Grand Jury Prize), The Usual Suspects, The Way of the Gun, Forbidden Kiss, Captain Abu Raed (the first independent movie made in Jordan and the Sundance Audience Award for World Dramatic Competition), and Mortdecai, and also serving as 2nd unit director on The Usual Suspects and The Way of the Gun.

As an executive, Kokin worked for several years heading production and development for Perfect World Pictures as well as consulting for NBCUniversal.

== Directed ==
Kokin produced and directed the documentary For Tomorrow in Argentina, which was an official selection for the Tribeca Film Festival and the Newport Beach Film Festival, where he won the Humanitarian Vision Award. The documentary premiered in 10 film festivals and created awareness for Toms Shoes.

In 2016, he directed Blood Moon, starring James Callis, Maya Kazan, and Frank Medrano and written by Nicholas Kazan.

He has also directed documentaries in South America, Haiti, and Africa about poverty and HIV facing children in those regions.
