= Bryan Singer =

American filmmaker (born 1965)

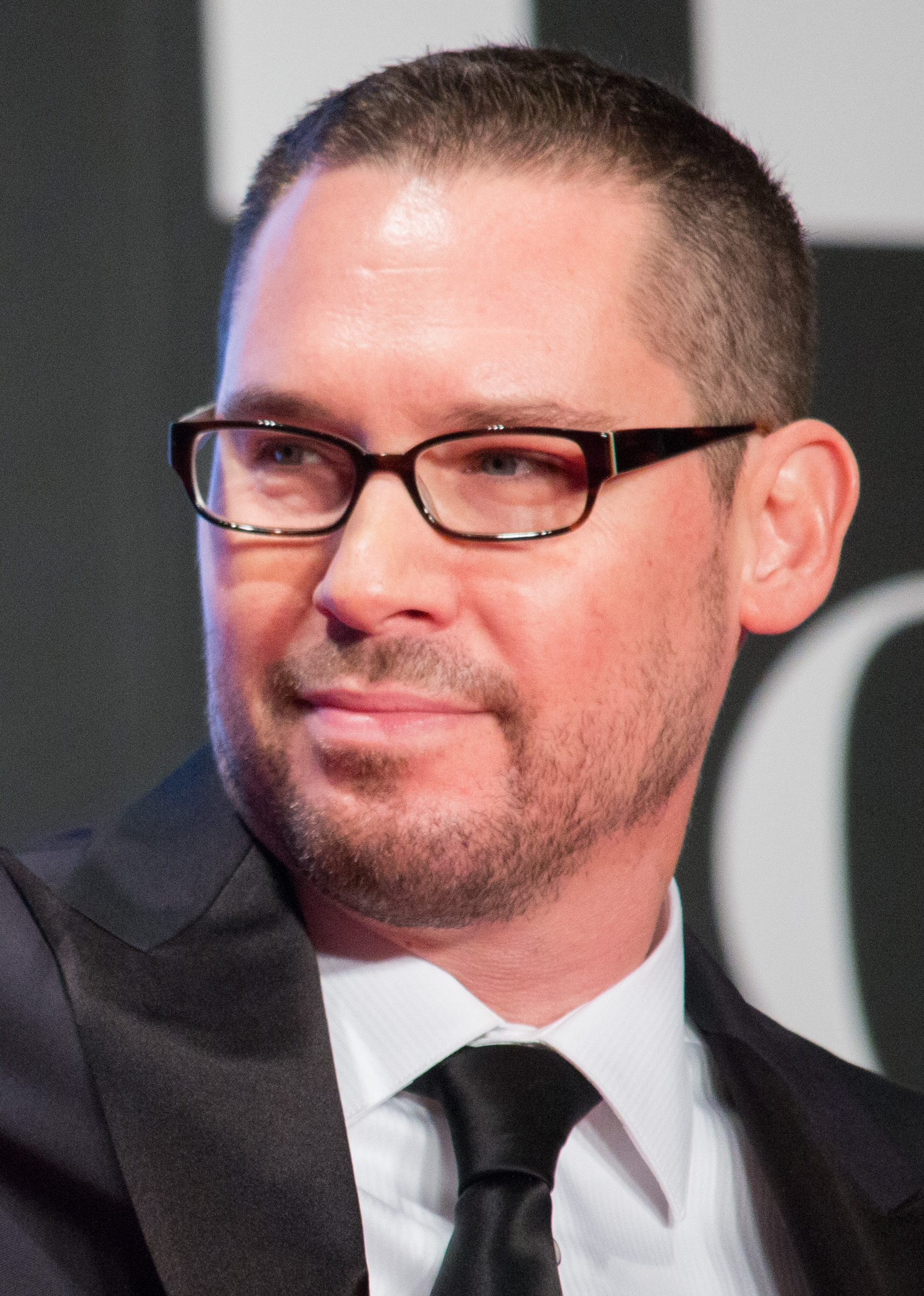
- Singer in 2015
- Born: Bryan Jay Singer; September 17, 1965 (age 61); New York City, U.S.
- Occupations: Director; film producer; screenwriter
- Years active: 1984–present
- Children: 1
- Website: bryansinger.com

Bryan Jay Singer (born September 17, 1965) is an American filmmaker. He is the founder of Bad Hat Harry Productions and has produced almost all of the films he has directed, as well as multiple television series.

After graduating from the University of Southern California, Singer directed his first short film, Lion's Den (1988). On the basis of that film, he received financing for his next film, Public Access (1993), which was a co-winner of the Grand Jury Prize at the 1993 Sundance Film Festival. In the mid-1990s, Singer received critical acclaim for directing the neo-noir crime thriller The Usual Suspects (1995). He followed this with another thriller, Apt Pupil (1998), an adaptation of a Stephen King novella about a boy's fascination with a Nazi war criminal.

In the 2000s, he became known for big budget superhero films such as X-Men (2000), for which Singer won the 2000 Saturn Award for Best Director, its sequel X2 (2003), and Superman Returns (2006). He then directed the World War II historical thriller Valkyrie (2008), co-wrote/co-produced X-Men: First Class (2011), and directed the fantasy adventure film Jack the Giant Slayer (2013), as well as two more X-Men films, X-Men: Days of Future Past (2014) and X-Men: Apocalypse (2016). Singer also directed the Queen biographical film Bohemian Rhapsody (2018), although he was fired during the last weeks of filming.

Lawsuits containing allegations of sexual assault were filed against Singer in 1997, 2014, and 2017. In 2019, The Atlantic published a report containing multiple allegations of sexual misconduct, which led to him losing several jobs in the entertainment industry.

== Early life ==
Singer was born on September 17, 1965 in New York City. He was adopted by Grace Sinden, an environmental activist, and Norbert Dave Singer, a corporate executive. He grew up in a Jewish household in West Windsor Township, New Jersey. In his early teens, he started making 8mm films as well as experimenting with photography. He attended West Windsor-Plainsboro High School South, graduating in 1984. He studied filmmaking for two years at the School of Visual Arts in New York. Later, he transferred to the USC School of Cinematic Arts in Los Angeles, where he participated in the Critical Studies program.

== Career ==
=== 1980s–1990s ===
Singer directed a short film in 1988 called Lion's Den involving a number of friends, including actor Ethan Hawke, whom he knew from his childhood in New Jersey, and editor John Ottman, whom he had met while working on a friend's short film. After a screening of Lion's Den, Singer was approached by someone from Tokuma Japan Productions, a Japanese company interested in funding a series of low-budget films. Singer pitched a concept that eventually became the drama film Public Access (1993). Ottman again served as editor but this time also composed the score for the film. At the 1993 Sundance Film Festival, the film was named as co-winner of the Grand Jury Prize with Ruby in Paradise.

In 1994, he founded the production company Bad Hat Harry Productions, in homage to Steven Spielberg and the famous line from Jaws. Singer followed this by directing the crime thriller film The Usual Suspects, which was screened out of competition at the 1995 Cannes Film Festival. It was a success, winning Christopher McQuarrie an Academy Award for Best Writing (Original Screenplay), and actor Kevin Spacey an Academy Award for Best Supporting Actor.

In 1998, Singer obtained the rights to adapt Stephen King's novella Apt Pupil, a thriller about an all-American boy discovering that a wanted Nazi war criminal lives in his neighborhood. Singer's thriller film adaptation starred Ian McKellen, Brad Renfro, and David Schwimmer.

=== 2000s ===
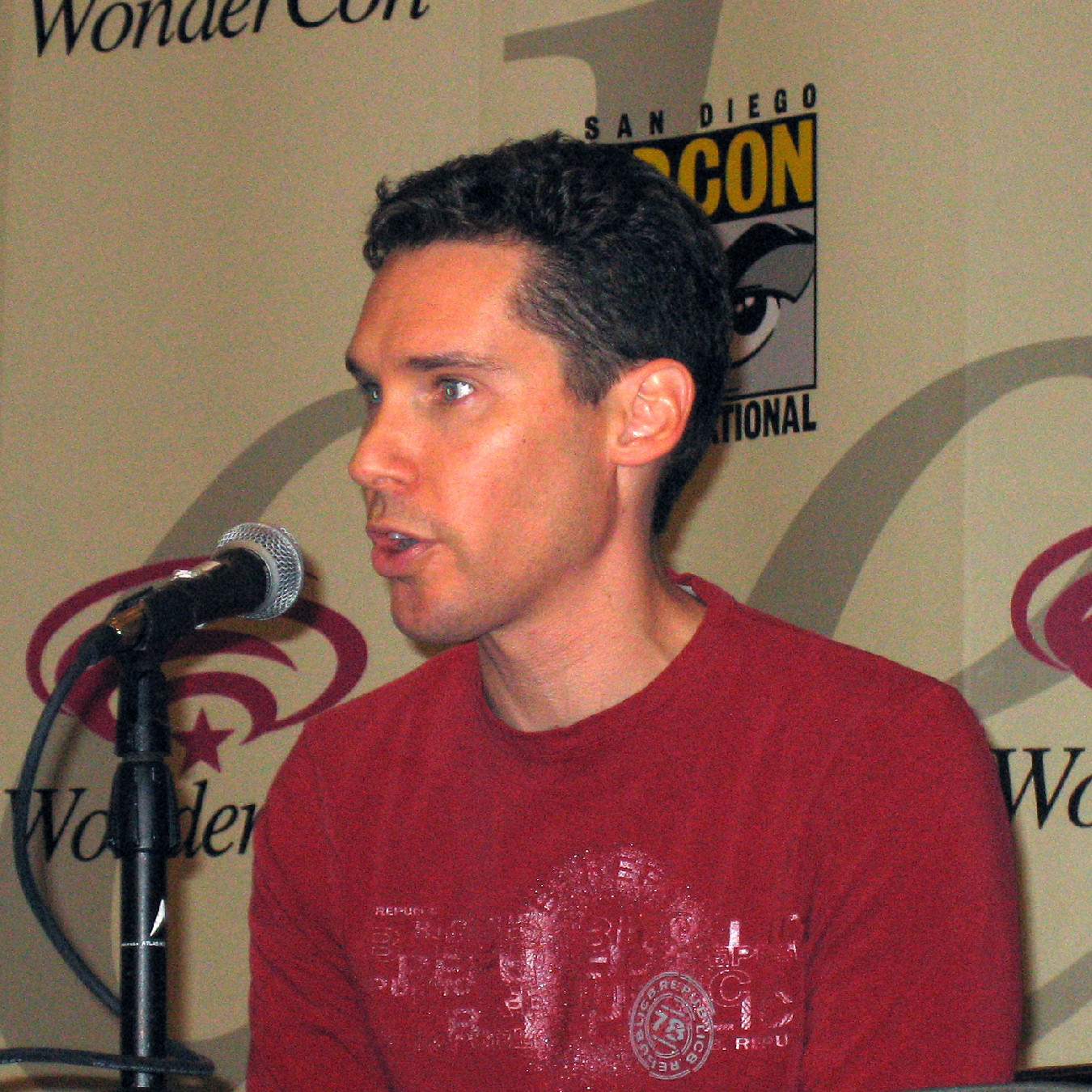
Singer at Comic Con 2006

In the early 2000s, Singer was hoping to direct Confessions of a Dangerous Mind based on the Chuck Barris book of the same name. The film was later directed by George Clooney for Miramax Films with Sam Rockwell in the lead role. In February 2001, Singer was attempting to produce a new Battlestar Galactica television series for Studios USA (now NBC Universal Television Studio). Speaking to BBC News, Singer said he was "confident that the Galactica brand is a sleeping giant. It was a show I watched during its initial run, from the pilot to the final episode. The essence and the brand name is quite potent in a climate where there's a great deficit of sci-fi programming." Singer eventually left the project, which was produced by another team on the Sci Fi Channel.

Singer directed the superhero films X-Men (2000) and X2 (2003), which were commercial successes. In mid-2004, Singer was in negotiations to direct X-Men: The Last Stand for 20th Century Fox when he agreed to direct Superman Returns for Warner Bros. Pictures. In consequence, 20th Century Fox terminated its production deal with Bad Hat Harry Productions, Singer's production company.

Superman Returns was filmed in Australia in 2005, and was released on June 28, 2006. Singer said that he had always admired and identified with the character, citing the fact that he and Superman are both orphans, noting that he was inspired by the 1978 film starring Christopher Reeve and by the comics of Alex Ross.

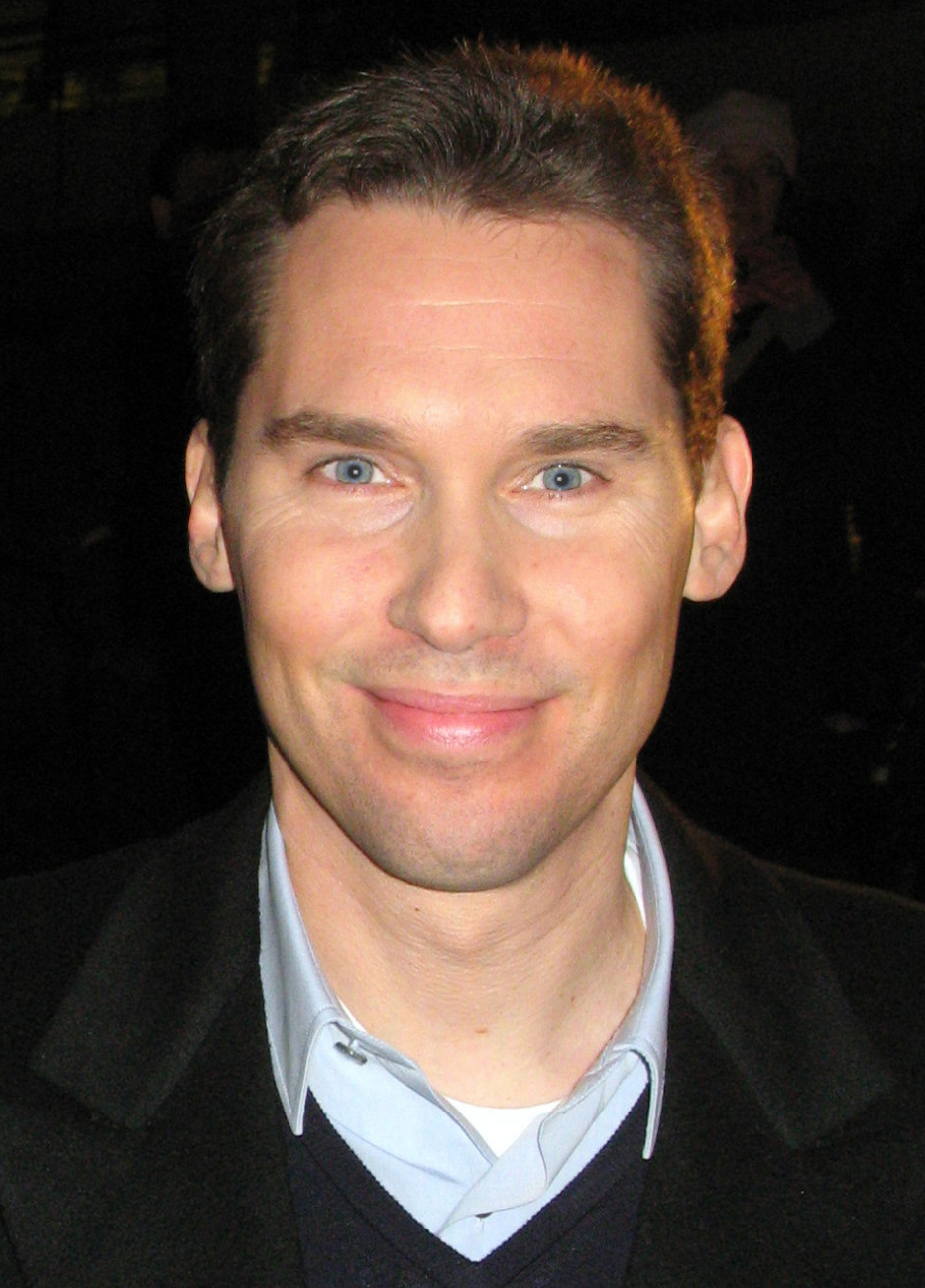
Singer at the premiere of Valkyrie in 2009

In August 2009, Universal Pictures announced that Singer would direct and produce a big screen reimagining of the Battlestar Galactica television series of the late-1970s, which would not draw any material from the Syfy Channel reimagined series. On September 10, 2009, it was announced that NBC had partnered with Singer and Bryan Fuller to adapt Augusten Burroughs's novel Sellevision into a series about a fictional home shopping network, according to The Hollywood Reporter. Neither project was ultimately produced.

At the premiere of James Cameron's Avatar on December 16, 2009, Singer confirmed that he would be directing the fantasy adventure film Jack the Giant Slayer (2013) for Warner Bros. Pictures, and that he had signed on to do X-Men: First Class, but conflicts between the two projects led to Singer being only a producer and co-screenwriter on First Class, with Matthew Vaughn taking over directorial duties.

=== 2010s ===
In October 2012, it was announced that Singer would direct the next movie in the X-Men series, X-Men: Days of Future Past; Vaughn stayed on as a producer and screenwriter, and the film was released in May 2014. Singer produced the commercials for the ice cream Magnum Gold, which featured Benicio del Toro. In 2012, Singer was the executive producer alongside Jane Lynch of the short film, Ronny and I, directed by Guy Shalem that screened at Outfest and Cannes. Singer directed another X-Men film, X-Men: Apocalypse, which he also produced and co-wrote with Simon Kinberg, Dan Harris, and Michael Dougherty. Days of Future Past stars Hugh Jackman, James McAvoy, Michael Fassbender, Jennifer Lawrence, Nicholas Hoult, Lucas Till, and Evan Peters re-teamed with Singer for Apocalypse. After the release of X-Men: Apocalypse in 2016, Singer expressed interest in directing a solo Mystique film starring Jennifer Lawrence.

In 2015, Singer, Bad Hat Harry Productions, and Same Name Productions started to collaborate on a documentary project with Guy Shalem. The documentary was set to explore the Israeli–Palestinian conflict through the vantage point of a dynamic Arab-Israeli activist. In 2016, Fox announced that Singer would direct its version of Twenty Thousand Leagues Under the Seas, after having been asked to participate on the elaboration of the movie's script.

In November 2016, it was announced that Singer would direct the Queen biopic Bohemian Rhapsody. He produced the film with Jim Beach and Graham King. On December 1, 2017, The Hollywood Reporter reported that 20th Century Fox had temporarily halted production due to the "unexpected unavailability" of Singer, with sources saying that he had failed to return to the set after the Thanksgiving week. Producers were nervous about the state of production and started discussions about potentially replacing him, at which point cinematographer Newton Thomas Sigel may have stepped in to direct during Singer's absence. Singer's absence was reportedly due to "a personal health matter concerning [him] and his family", and Singer's representatives stated that he was visiting his ill mother. However, other sources stated that the film's lead actor Rami Malek and the crew had grown tired of Singer's behavior; Singer had reportedly shown up late to set on multiple occasions, and had repeatedly clashed with Malek. On December 4, 2017, Singer was fired as a director with about two weeks remaining in principal photography. Singer's replacement Dexter Fletcher is quoted saying he came in and "just finished it up, really." 20th Century Fox terminated his Bad Hat Harry Productions deal with the studio. Singer still received directorial credit for Bohemian Rhapsody due to a Directors Guild of America ruling that only a sole director can receive credit.

At the end of January 2017, Singer signed on to direct an action adventure pilot in the X-Men Universe entitled The Gifted. The show was broadcast on Fox and canceled after two seasons.

=== 2020s ===
In June 2023, Variety reported that Singer was producing and self-financing a documentary in which he would address the accusations of sexual abuse made against him.

In August 2025, Variety reported that Singer was secretly directing his first feature film in eight years, with Jon Voight in a starring role. Entitled Monument, the historical drama film was released in 2026, and also stars Joseph Mazzello as Voight's son. Set in 1999 in south Lebanon and Israel, the narrative of the true story follows father and son architects tasked by the Israeli government and the South Lebanon Army to build a controversial war memorial honoring fallen Lebanese soldiers.

== Personal life ==
Singer is bisexual. He has said that growing up in a Jewish household as a sexual minority influenced his movies. He and actress Michelle Clunie have a son who was born in January 2015.

Singer lived in Malibu, California before selling his property there in 2021. As of June 2023, he resided in Israel.

== Sexual assault allegations ==
=== 1997 lawsuit ===
In 1997, a 14-year-old extra accused Singer of asking him and other minors to film a shower scene nude for the film Apt Pupil. Two other adolescent boys, 16 and 17 years old, later supported the 14-year-old's claim. The boys claimed trauma from the experience and filed a civil suit against the filmmakers alleging infliction of emotional distress, negligence, and invasion of privacy, and alleged that they were filmed for sexual gratification. While some sources state that the civil case was dismissed due to insufficient evidence, others indicate that it was settled out of court. The Los Angeles County District Attorney's Office declined to press criminal charges.

=== 2014 lawsuits and allegations ===
In April 2014, Singer was accused in a civil lawsuit of sexual assault of a minor. According to the suit filed by attorney Jeff Herman, Singer is alleged to have drugged and raped actor and model Michael Egan III in Hawaii, after initially meeting him at parties hosted by convicted sex offender Marc Collins-Rector in the late 1990s. Singer's attorney called the allegations "completely fabricated" and said Singer planned to countersue. Singer denied the allegations in a statement, calling them "outrageous, vicious, and completely false". On May 22, 2014, Singer's attorney presented evidence to Federal District Judge Susan Oki Mollway stating that neither Singer nor Egan was in Hawaii at the time. In early August 2014, Egan sought to withdraw his lawsuit via a Request for Court Order of Dismissal, and asked that it be granted "without prejudice or an award of costs or fees, in the interest of justice."

In May 2014, another lawsuit was filed by attorney Jeff Herman on behalf of an anonymous British man. Both Singer and producer Gary Goddard (who was also named separately in the first case) were accused of sexually assaulting "John Doe No. 117". According to the lawsuit, Goddard and Singer met the man for sex when he was a minor and engaged in acts of "gender violence" against him while in London for the premiere of Superman Returns. The charge against Singer in this case was dismissed, at the accuser's request, in July 2014.

Singer was cited in the 2014 documentary film on child sexual abuse in Hollywood, An Open Secret, but details of Egan's allegations were omitted after Egan withdrew his lawsuit during the film's production. Author Bret Easton Ellis alleged that two of his former partners had attended underage sex parties hosted by Singer and fellow director Roland Emmerich.

=== 2017 lawsuit ===
On December 7, 2017, Cesar Sanchez-Guzman filed a lawsuit in Washington against Singer, alleging that he had been raped at age 17 by Singer in 2003. Singer denied the allegations and deleted his Twitter account. After the lawsuit was announced, the USC School of Cinematic Arts removed Singer's name from its Division of Cinema & Media Studies program, an action which had previously been petitioned for by students at the school due to the many allegations against him.

In June 2019, Sanchez-Guzman's bankruptcy trustee Nancy James recommended that a $150,000 settlement be approved, citing the absence of evidence that Singer attended the yacht party where the alleged assault took place. Singer's attorney Andrew Brettler said that Singer has maintained his innocence and that the "decision to resolve the matter with the bankruptcy trustee was purely a business one". Much of the settlement would go towards paying creditors and the administrators of the case, with the remainder allocated to Sanchez-Guzman.

=== 2019 allegations ===
On January 23, 2019, Alex French and Maximillian Potter published an investigative report in The Atlantic in which four more men alleged that Singer sexually assaulted them when they were underage. The article also claimed that Sanchez-Guzman's 2017 lawsuit was stalled when Singer's legal team reported Sanchez-Guzman to the Internal Revenue Service and to US immigration officials, although this was disputed by one of Singer's lawyers. In response to the men's allegations, Singer denied any association with them and described the journalists as "homophobic".

In the wake of the renewed allegations, GLAAD withdrew Bohemian Rhapsody's nomination for the year's GLAAD Media Award (in the Outstanding Film – Wide Release category) because "Singer's response to The Atlantic story wrongfully used 'homophobia' to deflect from sexual assault allegations". Time's Up released a statement on Twitter applauding the decision, stating, "The recent allegations regarding Bryan Singer's behavior are horrifying and MUST be taken seriously and investigated." On February 6, the British Academy of Film and Television Arts removed Singer's name from Bohemian Rhapsody's nomination for the BAFTA Award for Best British Film due to the allegations against him.

On February 11, Millennium Films stated that Red Sonja, a film that Singer had been attached to as director, was no longer on their slate of films; the company's founder, Avi Lerner, had previously defended hiring Singer in spite of the allegations.

== Filmography ==
=== Film ===
Year	Title	Credited as				Notes
Year	Title	Director	Producer	Writer	Actor	Notes
1988	Lion's Den	Yes	Yes	Yes	Yes	As Michael; short film
1993	Public Access	Yes	No	Yes	No	
1995	The Usual Suspects	Yes	Yes	No	No	
1998	Apt Pupil	Yes	Yes	No	No	
1998	Burn	No	Yes	No	No	
2000	X-Men	Yes	No	Story	No	
2002	Star Trek: Nemesis	No	No	No	Yes	As Kelly
2003	X2	Yes	Executive	Story	Cameo	As security guard
2006	Superman Returns	Yes	Yes	Story	No	
2006	Look, Up in the Sky: The Amazing Story of Superman	No	Executive	No	No	Documentary
2007	Color Me Olsen	No	Yes	No	No	Short film
2007	Trick 'r Treat	No	Yes	No	No	
2008	Valkyrie	Yes	Yes	No	No	
2011	X-Men: First Class	No	Yes	Story	No	
2013	Jack the Giant Slayer	Yes	Yes	No	No	
2013	Uwantme2killhim?	No	Yes	No	No	
2014	X-Men: Days of Future Past	Yes	Yes	No	Cameo	As man with a small film camera
2014	The Taking of Deborah Logan	No	Yes	No	No	
2016	X-Men: Apocalypse	Yes	Yes	Story	Cameo	As security guard
2018	Bohemian Rhapsody	Yes	Uncredited	No	No	Replaced by Dexter Fletcher late in production but retained credit as director
2019	Dark Phoenix	No	Uncredited	No	No	Removed from production and credits amid sexual assault allegations.
2026	Monument	Yes	Yes	No	No	

=== Television ===
Year	Title	Credited as				Notes
Year	Title	Director	Producer	Story	Actor	Notes
2004–2012	House	Yes	Executive	No	Yes	Episodes: "Pilot" (also known as "Everybody Lies"), "Occam's Razor" and "Sports Medicine"
2005	The Triangle	No	Yes	Yes	No	Miniseries
2006	The Science of Superman	No	Yes	No	No	TV documentary
2007	Football Wives	Yes	Yes	No	No	Episode: "Pilot"
2007–2009	Dirty Sexy Money	No	Yes	No	No	
2008	Valkyrie: The Plot to Kill Hitler	No	Yes	No	No	TV documentary
2012	Mockingbird Lane	Yes	Executive	No	No	TV special
2015	Battle Creek	Yes	Executive	No	No	Episode: "The Battle Creek Way"
2017	Legion	No	Executive	No	No	Removed from credits for season two onward amid sexual assault allegations
2017–2019	The Gifted	Yes	Executive	No	No	Episode: "eXposed"

=== Web series ===
Year	Title	Credited as				Notes
Year	Title	Director	Producer	Writer	Actor	Notes
2012–2013	H+: The Digital Series	No	Yes	No	No	

== Awards and nominations ==
Year	Work	Award	Category	Result	Ref.
1993	Public Access	Sundance Film Festival	Grand Jury Prize	Won	
1993	Public Access	Deauville American Film Festival	International Critics' prize	Won	
1995	The Usual Suspects	Tokyo International Film Festival	Silver prize	Won	
1995	The Usual Suspects	Seattle International Film Festival	Best Director	Won	
1996	The Usual Suspects	Empire Awards	Best Newcomer	Won	
1996	The Usual Suspects	Saturn Award	Best Director	Nominated	
1996	Himself	Saturn Award	President's Memorial Award	Won	
1999	Apt Pupil	Saturn Award	Best Director	Nominated	
2001	X-Men	Empire Awards	Best Director	Won	
2001	X-Men	Saturn Award	Best Director	Won	
2002	X-Men	Prix Nebula	Best Script	Nominated	
2004	X2	Saturn Award	Best Director	Nominated	
2007	Superman Returns	Empire Awards	Best Director	Nominated	
2007	Superman Returns	Saturn Award	Best Director	Won	
2009	Valkyrie	Saturn Award	Best Director	Nominated	
2015	X-Men: Days of Future Past	Saturn Award	Best Director	Nominated	
2017	X-Men: Apocalypse	Saturn Award	Best Director	Nominated	

Note: Singer was initially listed as a nominee for Best British Film at the British Academy Film Awards for Bohemian Rhapsody as a co-producer in 2019; however, following sexual assault allegations, the Academy announced that they had rescinded his nomination.

Directed Academy Award performances
Under Singer's direction, these actors have received Academy Award nominations and wins for their performances in their respective roles.

Year	Performer	Film	Result
Academy Award for Best Actor
2018	Rami Malek	Bohemian Rhapsody	Won
Academy Award for Best Supporting Actor
1995	Kevin Spacey	The Usual Suspects	Won
