= Meg Ryan filmography =

Actress filmography

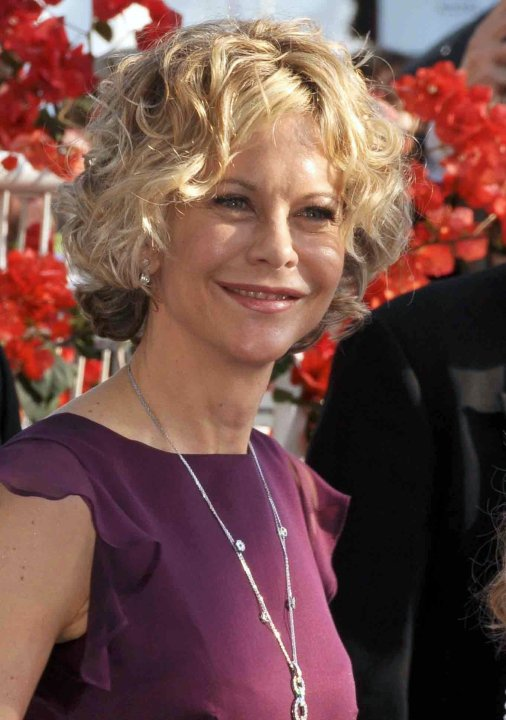
Ryan in 2010

Meg Ryan is an American actress and producer. Ryan began her acting career in 1981 in minor roles before joining the cast of the CBS soap opera As the World Turns in 1982. Subsequently, she began to appear in supporting roles in films during the mid 1980s like box office hit Top Gun, achieving recognition in independent films such as Promised Land (1987) before her performance in the Rob Reiner-directed romantic comedy When Harry Met Sally... (1989) brought her widespread attention and her first Golden Globe nomination.

Ryan subsequently established herself, both nationally and internationally, as one of the most successful actresses in the 1990s and early 2000s, particularly in romantic comedy films such as Sleepless in Seattle (1993), French Kiss (1995), You've Got Mail (1998), Hanging Up (2000) and Kate & Leopold (2001). Her other films include The Doors (1991), When a Man Loves a Woman (1994), Courage Under Fire (1996), Addicted to Love (1997), City of Angels (1998), Proof of Life (2000), and The Women (2008). In 2015, she made her directorial debut with Ithaca, a film in which she also acted.

== Filmography ==
Key
†	Denotes works that have not yet been released

=== Film ===
Year	Title	Role	Notes
1981	Rich and Famous	Debby Blake	
1983	Amityville 3-D	Lisa	
1986	Top Gun	Carole Bradshaw	
1986	Armed and Dangerous	Maggie Cavanaugh	
1987	Promised Land	Beverly "Bev" Sykes	
1987	Innerspace	Lydia Maxwell	
1988	D.O.A.	Sydney Fuller	
1988	The Presidio	Donna Caldwell	
1989	When Harry Met Sally...	Sally Albright	
1990	Joe Versus the Volcano	DeDe / Angelica Graynamore / Patricia Graynamore	
1991	The Doors	Pamela Courson	
1992	Prelude to a Kiss	Rita Boyle	
1993	Sleepless in Seattle	Annie Reed	
1993	Flesh and Bone	Kay Davies	
1994	When a Man Loves a Woman	Alice Green	
1994	I.Q.	Catherine Boyd	
1995	French Kiss	Kate	Also producer
1995	Restoration	Katharine	
1996	Courage Under Fire	CPT Karen Emma Walden	
1997	Addicted to Love	Maggie	
1997	Anastasia	Anastasia Romanov (voice)	
1998	City of Angels	Dr. Maggie Rice	
1998	Hurlyburly	Bonnie	
1998	You've Got Mail	Kathleen Kelly	
2000	Hanging Up	Eve Mozell Marks	
2000	Proof of Life	Alice Bowman	
2001	Kate & Leopold	Kate McKay	
2003	In the Cut	Frannie Avery	
2004	Against the Ropes	Jackie Kallen	
2007	In the Land of Women	Sarah Hardwicke	
2008	The Deal	Deidre Heam	
2008	My Mom's New Boyfriend	Martha Durand	
2008	The Women	Mary Haines	
2009	Serious Moonlight	Louise "Lou"	
2015	Ithaca	Mrs. Kate Macauley	Also director and producer
2023	What Happens Later	Wilhelmina "Willa" Davis	Also director and writer
2026	Good Sex †	TBA	Post-production

=== Television ===
Year	Title	Role	Notes
1982	As the World Turns	Betsy Stewart Montgomery Andropoulos	Main Cast, 1982-1984
1982	ABC Afterschool Special	Denise	Episode: "Amy and the Angel"
1982	One of the Boys	Jane	Recurring role, 13 episodes
1983	Tattletales	Herself	Soap opera couples week
1984–1985	Charles in Charge	Megan Harper	2 episodes
1985	Wildside	Cally Oaks	Recurring role, 6 episodes
1990–1991	Captain Planet and the Planeteers	Dr. Blight (voice)	Recurring role (season 1)
1997	Northern Lights	—N/a	Television film, Executive producer
2003	Tinseltown TV	Herself	Episode: "December 6, 2003"
2007	The Simpsons	Dr. Swanson (voice)	Episode: "Yokel Chords"
2008	Pangea Day	Herself	Television film
2009	Curb Your Enthusiasm	Herself	Episode: "The Reunion"
2011–2013	Web Therapy	Karen Sharpe	5 episodes
2015	Fan Girl	Mary Farrow	Television film
2026	The Simpsons	Sam (voice)	Episode: "Dream Scenari-Moe"

=== Documentaries ===
Year	Title	Role	Notes
1994	A Century of Cinema	Herself	Documentary with film personalities.
1998–2000	HBO First Look	Herself	Television documentary – The Making of Proof of Life (2000) – Getting Connected: On the Set of Hanging Up (2000) – The Making of You've Got Mail: A Conversation with Nora Ephron (1998)
1999–2001	The Directors	Herself	Television documentary – The Films of Lawrence Kasdan (2001) – The Films of Rob Reiner (1999)
2000	The Making of Hanging Up	Herself	Television documentary
2002	Nature	Herself	Television documentary – The White Elephants of Thailand
2002	Searching for Debra Winger	Herself	
2003	What's Going On?	Herself	Television documentary – Intolerance in Northern Ireland
2004	Love Hollywood Style	Herself	Television documentary
2006	The Making of Anastasia	Herself	Video documentary
2012	Half the Sky: Turning Oppression into Opportunity for Women Worldwide	Herself	
2015	Everything Is Copy	Herself	
2016	Gylne tider	Herself	Television documentary Episode: "Gylne tabber og tilbakeblikk"
