= Tony Krantz =

American film producer

- Born: June 16, 1959 (age 66)
- Occupations: Film producer; television producer; writer; director
- Parent(s): Judith Krantz; Steve Krantz
- Relatives: Mallory Lewis (cousin)

Tony Krantz (born June 16, 1959) is an American film and television producer, writer, and director. He began his career at Creative Artists Agency (CAA), where he worked for 15 years and led the primetime television department. During his time at CAA, he was involved in packaging several notable television series and films.

Krantz later co-founded Imagine Television, where he served as co-chairman and CEO, producing various television series and films. In 2002, he began directing and writing for film and television. His directing credits include Sublime, Otis, and The Big Bang. He is the founder and principal of the production company Flame Ventures.

== Early life ==
Krantz was born on June 16, 1959, in New York City to novelist Judith Krantz and film and television producer Stephen Falk Krantz. Krantz graduated from Beverly Hills High School in 1977 where he was senior class president. He then went on to college at the University of California, Berkeley where Krantz worked as a concert promoter for the student body. Krantz produced the Berkeley Jazz Festival in 1980 among numerous punk rock and rock concerts which would later influence his work.

== Career ==
Two weeks after graduation, Krantz started his professional career in the mailroom at CAA. After being promoted to assistant, Krantz quickly proved his knowledge and merit in the industry. Michael Ovitz noticed his potential and he was made an agent in the TV Literary Department shortly thereafter.

As Krantz rose from a TV literary agent to a television packaging agent at CAA, one of his early movie of the week packages won the Emmy for best television movie: Inherit the Wind, starring Kirk Douglas and Jason Robards directed by David Green. Afterwards, Krantz expanded into series, largely working with the agency's motion picture clients who at the time viewed the television business with skepticism. In 1990, Twin Peaks creator Mark Frost said he credited the development of the series to Krantz's "determination to get Frost and co-creator David Lynch to write a television script." Krantz later described packaging Twin Peaks as his personal "artistic high point" as an agent. Krantz also packaged ER. During an internal development meeting at CAA in 1993, Krantz remembered a film script that Michael Crichton had written years earlier based on his experience at Harvard medical school. Krantz re-read the script and then convinced a reticent Crichton and the script's owner Amblin Television and Warner Bros. to turn that 13-year-old work into what would eventually become the ultra-successful NBC drama, ER. Krantz found a showrunner for Crichton, John Wells (whom Krantz also represented), and the pilot was taken word for word from Crichton's film script. The series ran for 15 seasons and is widely considered one of the most successful dramas in television history. Other top series Krantz put together include Beverly Hills, 90210, Melrose Place and The West Wing.

Krantz built a reputation as an expert in his field and in 1996, he taught a course at UCLA Extension's department of entertainment studies and performing arts titled "Creating a Career in the Entertainment Industry." The course included discussions of conceptualization, business savvy, selling strategy and global distribution. He also taught extensively at the U.C. Berkeley's Haas School of Business and for three years to graduate students at U.S.C.'s Peter Stark Producing Program.

In 1998, Krantz left his career at CAA to produce television, and partnered with Brian Grazer and Ron Howard to found Imagine Television. Krantz served as CEO and co-chairman and was its principal partner. He executive produced many television shows, including Felicity with J. J. Abrams and Matt Reeves, Sports Night with Aaron Sorkin, Wonderland with Peter Berg, The PJs with Eddie Murphy, Mulholland Drive. with David Lynch, and 24 with Kiefer Sutherland. After six years at Imagine, Krantz chose to leave and pursue his producing and directing dream at his own company, Flame Ventures. In 2002, he was replaced at Imagine by former Fox executive Vice President of Programming, David Nevins, who now runs Showtime.

Krantz's opportunity to direct came with the development of the Raw Feed project, a series of direct-to-DVD movies that represented a first of this format for Warner Bros. Studios under their Warner Home Video division. Krantz told Elyse Eisenberg at Warner Home Video that his dream since the third grade was to direct. Eisenberg told him "Warner Bros would approve you as a director in a heartbeat." So Krantz became part of a trio of directors (alongside Daniel Myrick, director of The Blair Witch Project and John Shiban, writer and executive producer for Supernatural and The X-Files) who were tapped to create "Raw Feed," a series of films in the sci fi, horror, and thriller genres. In March 2007, the second film in the 6-part film series, a surreal psychological sci-fi thriller called Sublime, that marked Krantz's first directorial effort, was released. The film was directed by Krantz and written by Erik Jendresen. Krantz described it as "a thinking man's horror film" with a huge twist at the end. In 2008, the fourth film of the Raw Feed series, a black comedy/horror film entitled Otis was released. The film was co-penned by Jendresen and directed by Krantz during an 18-day shoot. The film stars Daniel Stern, Illeana Douglas and Kevin Pollak. In a 2008 interview at SXSW where it opened the festival in its midnight slot, Krantz described Otis as a purposeful satire on the over-abundance of torture and gore porn movies, but also a "meditation on the Iraq war."

The independent thriller The Big Bang was Krantz's most involved directing project to date. In a 2011 interview, Krantz stated that directing The Big Bang was "the most fun [he's] ever had professionally." He was involved in the project from its creative conception and developed the concept alongside frequent collaborator Erik Jendresen. The script was completed within four months. Krantz and Jendresen were influenced by the Coen brothers and David Lynch with the concept of putting a mystery story about particle physics into the middle of a neo-noir detective thriller about the search for a missing girl.

Agent Ed Limato of the William Morris Agency read the script, fell in love with it and gave it to Antonio Banderas, who quickly agreed to star in the film. Banderas was knowledgeable about astrophysics and particle physics, and immediately appreciated the hidden meanings in the script. Once he agreed to do the movie, the film was financed despite a difficult financial environment for independent film financing at the time. Actors were attracted to the unique film despite its lower budget. Along with Banderas, the cast included Thomas Kretschmann, William Fichtner, Delroy Lindo, Autumn Reeser, Sienna Guillory, James Van Der Beek, Sam Elliott, Jimmi Simpson and Snoop Dogg.

Much of the look of the movie was a result of Shelly Johnson's work in collaboration with Krantz as director. The film's visual style was also inspired by the surreal photography of Gregory Crewdson. J. Todd Anderson, a storyboard artist who works primarily with the Coen Brothers, agreed to work with Krantz to storyboard The Big Bang. Johnny Marr, acclaimed lead guitarist for The Smiths, wrote the score, the first time Marr had ever done a score for film. The film was shot over 30 days.

In late 2011, Krantz left his representation at WME and went back to CAA, this time as a client. Among the projects produced was Scruples, an adaptation of a 1978 novel written by Krantz's mother, Judith Krantz which was executive produced by Krantz with Natalie Portman. In 2013, Krantz's series Dracula aired on NBC, starring Jonathan Rhys-Meyers in the titular role and was produced by Krantz alongside Carnival Films, the production company behind the acclaimed Downtown Abby. Krantz is also credited as an executive producer for Blood & Oil with Don Johnson and Wu Assassins for Netflix.

John-Eric Caps is the current executive vice president of production and development at Flame Ventures.

== Projects in development ==
Among many television projects in development across broadcast, cable and streaming, Krantz is writing a movie on the famous Watergate burglars called the Plumbers, producing a remake of Cooley High (a film his father produced) and a multi-part scripted virtual reality science fiction series titled Six, about a doomed mission to Jupiter's moon Europa, 75 years in the future.

Krantz is also busy at work on Phantom, a noir thriller series he's created set in 1919 Paris, adapted from the classic book, Phantom of the Opera. Phantom is being done for DirectTV. Krantz is writing all episodes and directing most of that series.

== Creative Influences ==
Krantz describes his work as a concert promoter at Berkeley as the major early influence on his career, because it was all about "idealism, spirituality and artistic integrity." He says one particular concert with Talking Heads, that he produced with his partners at Berkeley, was one of the most transformative experiences in live music he ever had, along with his Berkeley Jazz Festival.

Apocalypse Now is Krantz's favorite film. At CAA he had the opportunity to represent Francis Coppola, packaging television projects for the director, including a television movie called White Dwarf, written by Bruce Wagner which aired on Fox.

When interviewed about his highly unusual transition from agent to executive producer to director and writer, Krantz shared that he has wanted to direct since he was in third grade at Rudolf Steiner School in New York City, but he knew that it would be difficult to enter that realm. As a child, he wrote letters to Woody Allen, Francis Coppola and Miloš Forman, asking them what it was like to be a director. He says the directing heroes of his life are Mike Nichols, Coppola, the Coen Brothers, David Fincher, Paul Thomas Anderson, and David Lynch because of their artistry. He acknowledges that he joined CAA at the start of his career mostly because he was looking for a job with structure and a path to earn a living after college. As an agent, the transition to producer was more seamless, and then he finally came around to being the director he always wanted to be. He defies a widely held conception in Hollywood that agents and even producers are not creatively inclined as directors and writers.

== Personal life ==
Krantz is married to Kristin Krantz, the co-founder and CEO of Prana Animation Studios. and CEO of Oscar and Emmy-winning visual effects company, Rhythm & Hues. They met at CAA and live together in Beverly Hills, California, and in Soho, New York City. Krantz has a brother, Nicholas Krantz.

His mother, Judith, was the sister of Jeremy P. Tarcher. Tarcher was the husband of entertainer Shari Lewis, and the father of entertainer Mallory Lewis.

When Krantz was worried about leaving his established, comfortable career at CAA to produce television, it was his wife who encouraged him to pick up the phone and call Brian Grazer to inquire about a partnership, after the couple saw the movie "Ransom" in San Francisco which Grazer produced and Ron Howard directed. This call eventually led to the founding of Imagine Television.

== Political life ==
As an active member of the Writers Guild and the Directors Guild, Krantz is also active in Democratic politics on a local and national level.

In May 2014, Krantz hosted a Foreign Policy Roundtable (on which he serves as a board member) at his home in Beverly Hills where attendees listened in on a conversation between Ari Shavit, noted Israeli journalist and author of My Promised Land, and Jessica Yellin, former CNN White House correspondent. The next year, Henry Kissinger spoke at the Krantz home as a guest of FPR.

== Awards ==
Krantz's shows have won numerous Emmys and Golden Globes and have been nominated for Oscars. In 2002, Krantz received the Producer's Guild Award for best dramatic series for his work on 24 as its executive producer.

== Filmography ==
=== Television ===
==== Comedy ====
- Hiller and Diller (1997–1998)
- Rock Me Baby (2003–2004)

==== Drama ====
- Sports Night (1998–2000)
- Felicity (1998–2002)
- Wonderland (2000)
- The Beast (2001)
- 24 (2001–2004)
- South Beach (2006)
- Kaya (2007)
- Dracula (2013–2014)
- Blood & Oil (2015)
- Wu Assassins (2019–present)
- The International (2020)

==== Animation ====
- The PJs (1999–2001)
