= The Big Bang (2011 film) =

- Theatrical release poster
- Directed by: Tony Krantz
- Written by: Erik Jendresen
- Produced by: Erik Jendresen; Richard Rionda Del Castro
- Starring: Antonio Banderas; Sienna Guillory; Autumn Reeser
- Cinematography: Shelly Johnson
- Edited by: Fred Raskin
- Music by: Johnny Marr
- Distributed by: Anchor Bay Entertainment; Big Bang Production; Flame Ventures; Hannibal Pictures; North by Northwest Entertainment
- Release dates: February 3, 2011 (Bahrain); May 13, 2011 (United States)
- Running time: 101 minutes
- Country: United States
- Language: English
- Budget: $17 million

The Big Bang is a 2011 American action thriller film written by Erik Jendresen and directed by Tony Krantz, starring Antonio Banderas and Sienna Guillory.

== Synopsis ==
Ned Cruz (Antonio Banderas) is a Los Angeles private investigator trying to find Lexie Persimmon (Sienna Guillory). The reclusive and eccentric billionaire Simon Kestral (Sam Elliott) is obsessed with finding "the god particle" by recreating the exact situation in which the universe may have formed. As the mystery unravels, Ned becomes unsure about whether Lexie actually exists. The film makes many references to particle physics and famous scientists. The character Fay Neman's name is a reference to physicist Richard Feynman.

== Plot ==
Detectives Poley (William Fichtner), Frizer (Thomas Kretschmann), and Skeres (Delroy Lindo) are interrogating Ned Cruz (Antonio Banderas), a Los Angeles private investigator, who tells them that five years earlier, Russian mobster Skinny Faddeev gave $30 million in blood diamonds as an advance to Anton (Robert Maillet), a boxer, to intentionally lose a fight against his nephew. However, during the fight, Anton unintentionally killed the nephew. When Skinny was found dead, Anton was sentenced to life in prison. While Anton was in prison, he received over 200 letters from a woman named Lexie Persimmon.

Anton gives Ned the job of finding Lexie. Ned is skeptical about his job, since he doesn't have a photo of Lexie. As he starts investigating the various clues, people start dying mysteriously. Ned also notices that a black Lincoln is following him, which he assumes is the Russian Mafia. He finds a clue that leads him to believe that Lexie might be in San Celeritas, New Mexico.

Ned then meets a waitress named Fay Neman (Autumn Reeser)—a particle physics buff—who helps him and sleeps with him. Ned meets Simon (Sam Elliott), his wife Julie (Sienna Guillory), and Niels Geck (Jimmi Simpson), a physicist who is conducting an experiment for Simon. Simon is interested only in finding the "God particle" and feels indifferent when Julie tries to warm up to Ned. Ned suspects that Julie might really be Lexie and decides to tell her what is happening. Meanwhile, Anton tracks down Ned to Simon's bungalow. Ned confronts Julie with his suspicions about Lexie's true identity, but Julie has no idea what he is talking about. Ned and Julie hear gunshots, causing Ned to suspect that Anton is at the house.

Realizing that he and Anton have both mistaken Julie for Lexie, Ned tries to save her. When the duo head toward the basement, Ned is astonished to find Niels dressed like a woman, and in a blonde wig. A box containing cosmetics has the phrase "Lex Parsimoniae"—a Latin phrase meaning "When all things are equal, the simplest solution is the best"—printed on it. Ned realizes that Niels had written the letters to Anton, who becomes angered when Niels tries to convince Anton to accept him. In a shootout, Ned is injured and passes out.

The story cuts back to the present day, where it is revealed that Niels and Anton killed each other while the detectives, who had followed Ned to Simon's house, held Ned and Julie hostage. Julie is kept bound and gagged with duct tape. Ned accuses the trio of following him and killing the people he met, also stating that Skinny was killed for diamonds, which his killer never recovered. Ned proves that Frizer killed all the people who could have known about the diamonds. Frizer admits his crimes, for which the other detectives scold him. Ned looks at a glass tank containing a gecko and realizes something; he tells the villains that he knows where Niels stored the diamonds.

The detectives take Ned and Julie to the spot where he had confronted Julie after she had shown him a hidden shoe box. While Julie and Ned are in the car, Skeres and Frizer go to get the shoe box. Meanwhile, Poley spots Julie and Ned signaling each other. He attacks them, but they overpower him and manage to drive the car towards Skeres and Frizer. Skeres and Frizer are disappointed when they discover the diamonds are not in the box. When they see the car coming towards them, they realize what is happening and start shooting. Ned shoots them both dead. Meanwhile, Simon the physicist's experiment destroys his lab and creates a giant crevasse. Ned and Julie speed away in the car, and later pick up Fay, who in a non serious tone complains that Ned solved the case, got the girl, the diamonds, while she gets a gecko (Its assumed that her fling with Ned is over much to her chagrin now that he is with Julie) and mockingly suggest they give the diamonds to Angola or Liberia, before lamenting she loves the car as the three drive away.

== Cast ==
- Antonio Banderas as Ned Cruz
- Sienna Guillory as Julie Kestral
- Thomas Kretschmann as Frizer
- Autumn Reeser as Fay Neman
- James Van Der Beek as Adam Nova
- Snoop Dogg as Puss
- Bill Duke as Drummer
- Delroy Lindo as Detective Skeres
- William Fichtner as Detective Poley
- Sam Elliott as Simon Kestral
- Rebecca Mader as Zooey Wigner
- Robert Maillet as Anton 'The Pro' Protopov
- Jimmi Simpson as Niels Geck
- William Marlowe as Skinny Fadeev

== Reception ==
The film received negative reviews. As of February 2025, the film holds a 19% approval rating on Rotten Tomatoes, based on 16 reviews with an average rating of 3.3/10. On Metacritic, the film has a weighted average score of 25/100 based on 9 critics, indicating "generally unfavourable reviews".
