= Erik Jendresen =

American screenwriter

- Jendresen in 2025
- Born: December 22, 1959 (age 66); Milwaukee, Wisconsin, U.S.
- Occupations: Author, playwright, screenwriter and producer
- Writing career
- Notable works: Band of Brothers; Killing Lincoln; Mission: Impossible – Dead Reckoning Part One

Erik Jendresen (born December 22, 1959) is an American author, playwright, screenwriter and producer. His projects include HBO miniseries Band of Brothers, executive produced by Steven Spielberg and Tom Hanks, Killing Lincoln, co-produced with Tony and Ridley Scott for the National Geographic Channel; a series based on the Francis Ford Coppola film, The Conversation (with Christopher McQuarrie); The Pony Express (with Robert Duvall); an eight-hour adaptation of Gregory Maguire's novel, Wicked (ABC); an eight-hour miniseries Majestic-12; and The Command - a series set in the world of the Joint Special Operations Command (FIC). He also co-wrote the seventh and eighth installments of the Mission: Impossible film series with McQuarrie.

== Career ==
As co-creator, lead writer and a supervising producer of the critically acclaimed mini-series Band of Brothers for HBO in 2001, Jendresen was one of the recipients of that year's Emmy Award for "Outstanding Miniseries", which he shared with Tom Hanks and Steven Spielberg, among others. Jendresen also shared an Emmy nomination for that show in the category of "Outstanding Writing for a Miniseries, Movie or a Dramatic Special". The show also resulted in a Golden Globe Award for "Best Mini-Series or Motion Picture Made for Television", and 20 other awards, including the Peabody Award.

As a writer/ producer for film, his current projects include The Mariner (directed by Christopher McQuarrie for FOX); Mission: Blacklist (directed by Rodrigo Cortés); Saint-Ex (directed by Christopher McQuarrie); Aloft (starring Robert Redford); Solo (directed by Antonio Banderas); and an adaptation of Walter Tevis's The Man Who Fell to Earth (directed by David Slade). Earlier film projects include Star Trek: The Beginning (Paramount), Sublime, starring Tom Cavanagh and Kathleen York, Otis and The Big Bang (starring Antonio Banderas and Sam Elliott), and Ithaca - an adaptation of William Saroyan's The Human Comedy (directed by Meg Ryan and starring Sam Shepard and Hamish Linklater).

As a writer, producer, and showrunner for television, his current projects include Special, a series based on documentary filmmakers of the 1960s (with Marti Noxon, for the National Geographic Channel); a series based on the stories of the French Foreign Legion (with Thomas Bidegain and Dimitri Rassam); The War, a five-season series about the unending interconnected conflicts of the 20th century (with Christopher McQuarrie); The 43, a six-hour mini-series about WWII British ex-servicemen fighting fascism on their home soil (BBC/NBC); A Coloured Man's Reminiscences, an eight-hour miniseries chronicling the story of James Madison's slave, Paul Jennings (with Tyger Williams and Rodrigo Garcia, for ABC); Castner's Cutthroats, a six-hour miniseries about the Battle of the Aleutians (Discovery Channel); Rocket Men, a ten-hour miniseries about Wernher von Braun and the men who took us to the moon and beyond; Climb to Conquer, a ten-hour miniseries about the 10th Mountain Division in World War II (with Wildwood); and Shot All to Hell, a four-hour miniseries about the James-Younger Gang and the Northfield, Minnesota, raid (TNT).

Jendresen also has authored several books, several dealing with the socio-anthropology of Peru and the Amazon Basin, including Dance of the Four Winds and its sequel, Island of the Sun (both based upon the journals of and co-written with Alberto Villoldo), and the children's book, The First Story Ever Told (also with Villoldo). Hanuman (with Joshua M. Greene, and Li Ming) is a re-telling for children of a portion of the Ramayana.

Jendresen co-wrote Mission: Impossible – Dead Reckoning Part One and Mission: Impossible – The Final Reckoning (originally Dead Reckoning Part Two) with director Christopher McQuarrie. McQuarrie and Jendresen have also been working on an as-yet untitled film with Tom Cruise, which McQuarrie described in 2022 as being "gnarlier" than the Mission: Impossible films and as "something we've talked about for a really long time. It's way outside of what you're used to seeing Tom do.".

He is also a playwright (The Killing of Michael Malloy, Excuse My Dust, Malice Aforethought).

== Personal life ==
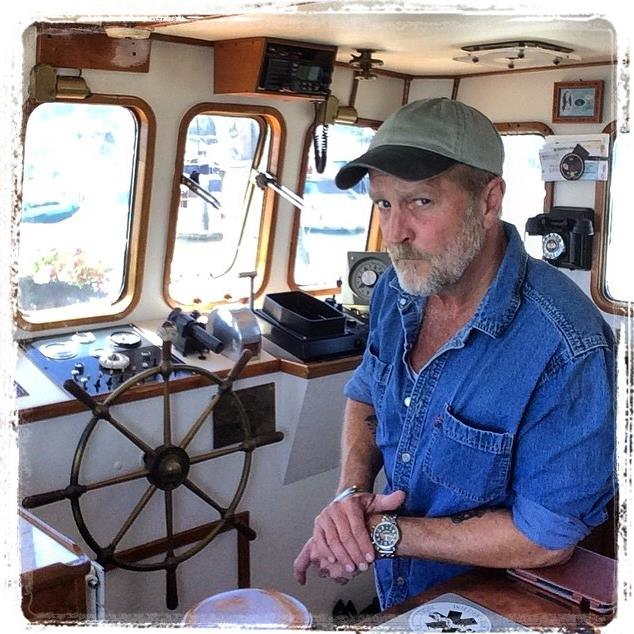
Jendresen aboard the MV Hindeloopen in 2020

Jendresen lives in Charlotte, North Carolina and Sausalito, California, aboard the M.V. Hindeloopen, a 119-year-old riveted wrought iron vessel which saw service during the Dunkirk evacuation in 1940. He is married to Venus Madora Aslee Bobis, a psychotherapist and his partner in Pilothouse Pictures.

== Filmography ==
Film

Year	Title	Writer	Producer
2002	Crazy as Hell	Yes	No
2011	The Big Bang	Yes	Yes
2015	Ithaca	Yes	Yes
2023	Mission: Impossible – Dead Reckoning Part One	Yes	No
2025	Mission: Impossible – The Final Reckoning	Yes	No

Direct-to-video

Year	Title	Writer	Co-Producer
2007	Sublime	Yes	Yes
2008	Otis	Yes	No

TV movies

Year	Title	Writer	Executive producer
2000	Deadlocked	Yes	No
2013	Killing Lincoln	Yes	Yes

TV series

Year	Title	Writer	Executive producer	Notes
2001	Band of Brothers	Yes	Yes	3 episodes
