= Crazy Kind of Love =

- Theatrical released poster
- Directed by: Sarah Siegel-Magness
- Screenplay by: Karen McCullah Lutz
- Based on: Angel Angel by April Stevens
- Produced by: Bobbi Sue Luther; Gary Magness; Karen McCullah Lutz
- Starring: Virginia Madsen; Amanda Crew; Zach Gilford; Sam Trammell; Aly Michalka; Eva Longoria; Graham Rogers
- Cinematography: Dean Cundey
- Edited by: Dana Congdon
- Music by: Mario Grigorov
- Production company: Smokewood Entertainment Group
- Distributed by: Phase 4 Films
- Release date: May 31, 2013
- Running time: 100 minutes
- Country: United States
- Language: English
- Budget: $10 million
- Box office: $21.2 million

Crazy Kind of Love is a 2013 American romantic comedy-drama film directed by Sarah Siegel-Magness which is based on the 1995 novel Angel Angel by April Stevens. The film stars Virginia Madsen, Graham Rogers, Amanda Crew, Zach Gilford and Sam Trammell in lead roles and was released on May 31, 2013.

== Plot ==
Depressed after getting dumped by her cheating husband, Augusta recovers from a resulting nervous breakdown by way of observing her two sons, 18-year-old Henry and older brother Matthew, as they come of age.

== Cast ==
- Virginia Madsen as Augusta Iris
- Graham Rogers as Henry Iris
- Amanda Crew as Bette Mack
- Zach Gilford as Matthew Iris
- Sam Trammell as Jeff Lucas
- Madeline Zima as Annie Miller
- Kristoffer Ryan Winters as Dave
- Anthony LaPaglia as Gordie
- Aly Michalka as Janeen Bosh
- Lin Shaye as Denise Mack
- Christopher Atkins as Mr. Jeffries

== Production and casting ==
The original working title was Long Time Gone. Meg Ryan was originally attached to the role of Augusta, but bowed out and was replaced by Virginia Madsen in September 2011.

This was the directorial debut for Sarah Siegel-Magness, who had been producer on three films, including Precious (2009), prior to joining this film. Karen McCullah wrote the screenplay after optioning the book. On June 16, 2011, Variety reported that newcomer Graham Rogers joined the adaptation playing a teen son. Seth Jaret, Bobbi Sue Luther and Gary Magness produced the film. True Blood actor Sam Trammell also joined the cast. In early July 2011, Zach Gilford, Madeline Zima and Aly Michalka were signed to the film.
