= Otis (film) =

- DVD cover
- Directed by: Tony Krantz
- Written by: Erik Jendresen; Thomas Schnauz
- Produced by: Tony Krantz; Daniel Myrick; John Shiban; Steve Ecclesine
- Starring: Bostin Christopher; Ashley Johnson; Daniel Stern; Illeana Douglas; Kevin Pollak; Jere Burns
- Cinematography: Thomas Yatsko
- Edited by: Alex Marquez
- Music by: James S. Levine
- Production company: Raw Feed
- Distributed by: Warner Home Video
- Release dates: March 7, 2008 (SXSW); June 10, 2008
- Running time: 100 minutes
- Country: United States
- Language: English

Otis is a 2008 American direct-to-DVD comedy horror film directed by Tony Krantz, and written by Erik Jendresen and Thomas Schnauz. It is the fourth Raw Feed release from Warner Home Video.

== Plot ==
In the midst of a serial killer's rampage and kidnappings, beautiful young Riley Lawson goes missing. When her desperate parents, Will and Kate, are contacted by her kidnapper, insufferable FBI Special Agent Hotchkiss takes charge of the case.

However, from deep within the psychopathic subterranean world created by Otis Broth, Riley turns the tables on her tormentor, manages to escape, and then contact her parents. Fed up with the inability of the FBI to find their girl, Will, Kate, and Riley's brother Reed, decide to take matters – and revenge – into their own hands.

== Cast ==
- Bostin Christopher as Otis Broth
- Ashley Johnson as Riley Lawson
- Daniel Stern as Will Lawson
- Illeana Douglas as Kate Lawson
- Jere Burns as FBI Special Agent Ralph Hotchkiss
- Jared Kusnitz as Reed Lawson
- Kevin Pollak as Elmo Broth
- Tarah Paige as Ashland Warner/Kim
- Tracy Scoggins as Rita Vitale/Anchorwoman
- Ashley Greene as Kim #4
- Lawrence Hilton-Jacobs as Orderly
