= Dracula (2013 TV series) =

British-American television drama

- Genre: Drama; Gothic horror; Thriller
- Created by: Cole Haddon; Daniel Knauff
- Based on: Dracula by Bram Stoker
- Starring: Jonathan Rhys Meyers; Mohamed Attia; Jessica De Gouw; Thomas Kretschmann; Victoria Smurfit; Oliver Jackson-Cohen; Nonso Anozie; Katie McGrath
- Composer: Trevor Morris
- Countries of origin: United Kingdom; United States
- Original language: English
- No. of seasons: 1
- No. of episodes: 10

Production
- Executive producers: Colin Callender; Daniel Knauf; Tony Krantz; Gareth Neame; Anne Mensahn
- Production location: Hungary
- Cinematography: Ousama Rawi
- Editor: Paul Knight
- Running time: 43 minutes
- Production companies: Universal Television; Carnival Films; Flame Ventures; Playground Entertainment

Original release
- Network: NBC (US); Sky Living (UK)
- Release: 25 October 2013 – 24 January 2014

Dracula is a horror drama television series. The series, a reimagining of Bram Stoker's 1897 novel Dracula, was produced by London-based Carnival Films; it aired in the United States on NBC and in the United Kingdom on Sky Living from 25 October 2013, to 24 January 2014. It was created by Cole Haddon and Daniel Knauf, while Daniel Knauf served as showrunner and head writer.

The series was given a straight-to-series commitment of ten episodes. It was cancelled after one season.

== Premise ==
After being revived by a mysterious figure through the blood of a graveyard thief, Dracula arrives in London posing as Alexander Grayson, an American entrepreneur who claims to bring modern science to Victorian society. In reality, he seeks revenge on the Order of the Dragon, a power-hungry organization that ruined his life centuries earlier. Abraham Van Helsing, who was later revealed to have brought Dracula back to life, is also out for revenge, and the two form an uneasy alliance. Their plans are complicated when Dracula becomes fascinated with Mina Murray, a woman who seems to be a reincarnation of his dead wife, Ilona.

== Cast and characters ==
=== Main cast ===
- Jonathan Rhys Meyers as Dracula / Alexander Grayson / Vlad Basarab III / Vlad Tepes
- Jessica De Gouw as Mina Murray / Ilona, a medical student and the reincarnation of Dracula's long-dead wife.
- Thomas Kretschmann as Abraham Van Helsing, Mina's lecturer at university and a former member of the Order of the Dragon. Kretschmann previously played Dracula in the 2012 Italian horror film Dracula 3D.
- Victoria Smurfit as Lady Jayne Wetherby, a fashionable huntswoman who is immediately enticed by the King of Vampires.
- Oliver Jackson-Cohen as Jonathan Harker, a gauche journalist who is desperate to climb the ranks of aristocracy.
- Nonso Anozie as R. M. Renfield, Dracula's loyal confidant and keeper of secrets.
- Katie McGrath as Lucy Westenra, a rich society girl who harbors secret romantic feelings for Mina, her best friend.

=== Recurring cast ===
- Ben Miles as Lord Browning, the leader of the Order of the Dragon.
- Robert Bathurst as Lord Thomas Davenport
- Miklós Bányai as Szabo, Harker's friend and former co-worker at the newspaper.
- Phil McKee as Joseph Kowalski, Grayson's head technician.
- Anthony Calf as Dr. William Murray, Mina's father and the director of Bethlem Royal Hospital.
- Jemma Redgrave as Minerva Westenra, Lucy's mother.
- Tamer Hassan as Kaha Ruma aka "The Moroccan".

== Production ==
According to co-creator Haddon, who in 2023 wrote a retrospective on the series titled The Horror of Dracula, the series was born in February 2011, as a result of his feature spec Hyde, another monster reinvention, which got on the Black List. Gore Verbinski passed on the project, and it seemingly stalled until September 27, when NBC bought the pilot script. The subsequent development and production were arduous, with an unidentified producer on the series meddling with several key decisions, and nearly causing Haddon to quit several times. The essay series drew strong praise from other television professionals for its insight and honesty about the production process, including from showrunners Mickey Fisher and Steven S. DeKnight.

The series was shot in Budapest. Prior to the series premiere, NBC released an animated web companion entitled Dracula Rising, which serves as a prequel that depicts the origin story of the titular character.

== Episodes ==
No.	Title	Directed by	Written by	Original release date	US viewers (millions)
1	"The Blood Is the Life"	Steve Shill	Cole Haddon	25 October 2013	5.26
After recently coming to England, Dracula, posing as rich American Entrepreneur, Alexandar Grayson, hosts a ball for the locals of the town he moved to. There he meets, Mina, a woman he would later grow fixated on due to her looking like his dead former lover Ilona.
2	"A Whiff of Sulfur"	Steve Shill	Daniel Knauf	1 November 2013	3.39
Grayson and Lady Jayne become lovers, despite his suspicions about her being involved with the Order of the Dragon. Mina asks for Grayson's help with a challenge at medical school which leads to a much desired success; Van Helsing continues his work on a solar vaccine for Dracula as Harker enters a bargain with the devil.
3	"Goblin Merchant Men"	Andy Goddard	Harley Peyton	8 November 2013	2.96
With the help of Mina, Grayson starts to attack members of the Order of the Dragon. From there he investigates Lady Jayne, finding out her life within the Order. However, Mina soon grows depressed to which her best friend Lucy tries to help. Jonathan who is Mina's current lover gets advice from Grayson on how he might fix the situation of her being depressed.
4	"From Darkness to Light"	Andy Goddard	Tom Grieves	15 November 2013	2.99
Grayson goes out and tries to win over Order member Lady Jayne to keep suspicion away from him being Dracula, who they were looking for. Lucy, who loved her best friend Mina, attempts to hide her broken heart by planning Mina's engagement party to Jonathan.
5	"The Devil's Waltz"	Nick Murphy	Nicole Taylor	29 November 2013	2.84
Mina receives a dream which shows Grayson telling her that Jonathan wasn't the right man. Van Helsing and Grayson attempt to revive a woman vampire. After finding out Renfield was tortured, he went out and avenged them. It is then shown at a party that Mina attempts to introduce Helsing and Grayson, not realizing they had already met prior. Lucy sees Jayne searching for someone, assuming it was because she was in love with Grayson already. The Order discusses with Jayne the possibility of Grayson being Dracula, as both appeared at the same time. Jayne dismisses the Order, but the Order warns her that she will be the first woman vampire hunter to be blinded by lust.
6	"Of Monsters and Men"	Nick Murphy	Katie Lovejoy	6 December 2013	3.83
Browning decides to host a board meeting in the sunlight in an effort to expose Grayson, putting Van Helsing under even more pressure, albeit he finds a method via reanimating Grayson's heart. Grayson attends the meeting whilst exposed to direct sunlight and manages to pull through, until Lord Davenport stops him, causing his cheek to burn. Lucy comes over for a sleepover with Mina in which she professes her true feelings and attempts to seduce Mina, but this upsets her, leading her to ask Lucy to leave. Finally, Mina and Harker reconcile and have sex.
7	"Servant to Two Masters"	Brian Kelly	Rebecca Kirsch	3 January 2014	2.90
Grayson is blinded by his invulnerability to sunlight that he stops drinking blood, which leads him to grow sickly. Renfield is sent to Budapest to get a painting of Ilona which was stolen by the Order. Davenport learns that Mina is the one Grayson wants. Jayne suggests Lucy entice Harker to seduce Mina for her gain.
8	"Come to Die"	Brian Kelly	Harley Peyton	10 January 2014	2.47
Mina tries to avoid Grayson and focus on her schoolwork, but gets attacked by Davenport's men. Harker becomes mad with jealousy after seeing Mina's portrait, which is actually a portrait of Ilona and has sex with Lucy. Lady Jayne learns that Dracula has returned to London after seeing Davenport's men impaled on gates.
9	"Four Roses"	Tim Fywell	Story by : Jesse Peyronel; Teleplay by : Daniel Knauf	17 January 2014	2.78
Grayson goes to war with the Order of the Dragon just as Harker becomes a member of the group. Lucy reveals to Mina that she and Harker slept together that damages her friendship with Mina, as she recovers from her attack. Mr. Browning desperately searches for his children. Lady Jayne prepares to hunt the ultimate vampire, Dracula. Grayson turns Lucy into vampire for betraying Mina, as he believes that she is a monster.
10	"Let There Be Light"	Tim Fywell	Cole Haddon	24 January 2014	3.04
After Harker sabotages a demonstration of sunlight technology, Grayson now knows that he is the enemy and part of the Order of the Dragon. Jayne employs a seer with a relic containing the blood of Christ and gets killed by Grayson. Grayson reveals to Mina that she is the reincarnation of his long dead wife, Ilona and they officially become a couple in the process. Van Helsing intends to hunt down Dracula, due to having a falling out, with him and tells Harker that Grayson is Dracula.

== Awards and nominations ==
Year	Group	Award	Result	Notes
2014	American Society of Cinematographers	Outstanding Achievement in Cinematography in One-Hour Episodic Television Series	Nominated	Dracula
2014	People's Choice Awards	Favorite New TV Drama	Nominated	Dracula
2014	People's Choice Awards	Favorite Actor in a New TV Series - Jonathan Rhys Meyers	Nominated	Dracula

== See also ==
- Vampire film
- List of vampire television series
