= Angel Angel =

1995 novel by April Stevens

- Author: April Stevens
- Language: English
- Genre: Novel
- Publisher: Viking Press
- Publication date: 1995
- Publication place: United States
- Media type: Print (hard & paperback)
- Pages: 669
- ISBN: 0-14-024213-9

Angel Angel is the 1995 debut novel by American writer April Stevens. The story, set in Connecticut, centers upon a dysfunctional suburban family whose malaise is challenged by the introduction of the older son's live-in girlfriend. The novel, published by Viking Press, was well received.

== Plot summary ==
The Irises, a typical suburban family in Connecticut, are thrown into disarray upon the discovery of the patriarch's extra-marital affair. With his absence in the marital home, his wife, Augusta, struggles to understand or come to terms with the betrayal and takes to her bed for weeks. Her two sons, Matthew and Henry, face their own demons and are little help to their mother. However the introduction of Henry's sassy live-in girlfriend forces the family out of their emotional downward spiral.

== Reception ==
Gary Krist, writing in The New York Times, noted that Stevens "is a wonderfully fluent storyteller with a shrewd eye for the offbeat". Time described the book as "intelligent and moving", continuing that Stevens conveys the protagonist's "knowing honesty reminiscent of Edna O'Brien". Publishers Weekly described it as an "auspicious debut", continuing that Stevens' "touch is assured (and) her ear for vernacular dialogue marvelously sharp". The writer Stewart O'Nan also cited Angel Angel in a list of his favorite "overlooked" books.

== Film adaptation ==
In May 2011, Variety reported that the novel would be adapted into the film Long Time Gone, with Precious producer Sarah Siegel-Magness making her directorial debut and Meg Ryan attached to star as Augusta, however she was later replaced by Virginia Madsen. Production was slated to begin in the fall of 2012 in Los Angeles.
