= Mission: Impossible – Dead Reckoning Part One =

2023 film by Christopher McQuarrie

- Theatrical release poster
- Directed by: Christopher McQuarrie
- Written by: Christopher McQuarrie; Erik Jendresen
- Based on: Mission: Impossible by Bruce Geller
- Produced by: Tom Cruise; Christopher McQuarrie
- Starring: Tom Cruise; Hayley Atwell; Ving Rhames; Simon Pegg; Rebecca Ferguson; Vanessa Kirby; Henry Czerny
- Cinematography: Fraser Taggart
- Edited by: Eddie Hamilton
- Music by: Lorne Balfe (Note: Mission: Impossible Theme composed by Lalo Schifrin)
- Production companies: Paramount Pictures; Skydance; New Republic Pictures (uncredited); TC Productions
- Distributed by: Paramount Pictures
- Release dates: June 19, 2023 (Rome); July 12, 2023 (United States)
- Running time: 163 minutes
- Country: United States
- Language: English
- Budget: $291 million (gross) $220 million (net)
- Box office: $571.1 million

Mission: Impossible – Dead Reckoning Part One (Note: Retroactively retitled Mission: Impossible – Dead Reckoning on streaming services.) is a 2023 American action spy film directed by Christopher McQuarrie from a screenplay he co-wrote with Erik Jendresen. It is the sequel to Mission: Impossible – Fallout (2018) and the seventh installment in the Mission: Impossible film series. The ensemble cast includes Tom Cruise, Hayley Atwell, Ving Rhames, Simon Pegg, Rebecca Ferguson, Vanessa Kirby, Esai Morales, Pom Klementieff, Mariela Garriga and Henry Czerny. Cruise plays the Impossible Missions Force agent Ethan Hunt, whose team faces a rogue artificial intelligence.

In January 2019, Cruise announced the next two Mission: Impossible films would be shot back-to-back, with McQuarrie writing and directing both. The cast was announced soon after, and Lorne Balfe, who composed the score for Fallout, returned to score. Filming began in Italy in February 2020 but was halted by the COVID-19 pandemic. It resumed later that year and wrapped in September 2021, with other filming locations including Norway, the United Kingdom and the United Arab Emirates. With an estimated gross budget of $291 million, including a net $220 million budget, it is one of the most expensive films ever made.

Dead Reckoning Part One premiered in Rome on June 19, 2023, and was theatrically released in the United States on July 12, by Paramount Pictures. It received critical acclaim and grossed $571.1 million worldwide, becoming the tenth-highest-grossing film of 2023, but was considered a box-office disappointment relative to its budget though it performed slightly better overseas. It was nominated in two categories at the 96th Academy Awards and the 77th British Academy Film Awards. A sequel, Mission: Impossible – The Final Reckoning, was released in 2025.

== Plot ==
The Sevastopol, a next-generation Russian stealth submarine on its inaugural mission, activates an advanced active learning defense system using a two-piece cruciform key. The AI becomes sentient and deceives the submarine crew into attacking themselves with their own torpedo, killing all aboard and sinking the Sevastopol in the Bering Sea. The AI, calling itself the "Entity", disappears into cyberspace.

World powers compete to obtain the key in hopes of controlling the Entity. IMF agent Ethan Hunt travels to the Empty Quarter of the Arabian Desert and retrieves one piece of the key from disavowed MI6 agent Ilsa Faust, faking her death to shield her from a bounty. Ethan infiltrates a U.S. Intelligence Community briefing in Washington, D.C. for Director of National Intelligence Denlinger, where CIA Director Eugene Kittridge explains that the Entity can control global defense intelligence and financial networks. Ethan reveals himself and forces Kittridge to admit to placing the bounty on Ilsa before escaping, intending to destroy the Entity.

Ethan and his IMF teammates Benji Dunn and Luther Stickell travel to Abu Dhabi International Airport to intercept the second piece of the key, though it is revealed to be a fake. While pursued by American agents, Ethan encounters Grace, a thief who steals the first piece of the key from him. Ethan aborts the mission when he recognizes Gabriel, a shadowy figure from his pre-IMF past acting as a liaison for the Entity. Grace escapes to Rome but is apprehended by police. Ethan arrives and frees her from custody while evading police, American agents, and an Entity operative named Paris. Grace escapes again, and Ethan rejoins Luther, Benji, and Ilsa.

Ethan and Ilsa follow Grace to Venice and infiltrate a party at the Doge's Palace held by arms dealer Alanna Mitsopolis, where Gabriel is in attendance. Already in possession of the second piece of the key, Alanna hired Grace to steal the first, and will sell the completed key to her buyer the next day on the Orient Express. Gabriel proclaims that he will possess the completed key the next day if either Ilsa or Grace dies. Ethan attempts to dissuade Alanna from the sale, though Gabriel and Grace escape. He pursues Grace, but the Entity hacks into their communications and impersonates Benji, leading Ethan into a fight with Paris, whom he defeats but spares. Gabriel incapacitates Grace and kills Ilsa, devastating Ethan.

While preparing for the sale, Luther leaves for an off-grid location, advising Ethan to spare Gabriel so they can question him about the Entity. On the train with Paris, Gabriel kills the engine crew and destroys the throttle and brake. He meets with Denlinger, who attempts to form an alliance with the Entity, which he reveals was originally an advanced cyber weapon that was intended to sabotage the Sevastopol as a test of its capabilities before going rogue. The completed key unlocks a chamber inside the Sevastopol containing the Entity's source code, allowing it to be destroyed or controlled. As this secret is known only to Denlinger, Gabriel kills him, and tries to kill Paris as the Entity has predicted she will betray them after Ethan spared her life.

Disguised as Alanna, Grace brings the key to Kittridge, revealed to be the buyer, and negotiates a $100 million sale alongside protection for herself, but relents and pickpockets the key from Kittridge. Ethan parachutes into the train to save Grace, though Gabriel is able to acquire the key. Fighting Ethan atop the train, Gabriel escapes and detonates a bridge ahead. Detaching the runaway locomotive and saving the passengers, Grace and Ethan climb through the falling train cars until they are rescued by Paris, who tells Ethan about the key's connection to the Sevastopol before collapsing. While Grace informs Kittridge she wishes to join the IMF, Ethan flees the wreckage by speed wing with the completed key, which he pickpocketed from Gabriel during the fight, and rendezvous with Benji to continue the mission.

== Cast ==
- Tom Cruise as Ethan Hunt, an IMF agent and leader of an operatives team.
- Hayley Atwell as Grace, a thief and Ethan's new ally. Christopher McQuarrie described Atwell's character as a "destructive force of nature", while Atwell explained that her character's loyalties are "somewhat ambiguous".
- Ving Rhames as Luther Stickell, an IMF computer technician, Ethan's best friend, and a member of his team.
- Simon Pegg as Benji Dunn, an IMF technical field agent, Ethan's friend and a member of his team.
- Rebecca Ferguson as Ilsa Faust, a disavowed MI6 agent who allied with Ethan's team during Rogue Nation (2015) and Fallout (2018).
- Vanessa Kirby as Alanna Mitsopolis, a black-market arms dealer and broker who goes by the alias "White Widow". Alanna is the daughter of Max, a deceased arms dealer originally portrayed by Vanessa Redgrave from the first film.
- Esai Morales as Gabriel, a liaison assassin and Ethan's adversary who appears to be working with the Entity, an all-powerful AI system, to rule the world. He and Ethan had a fateful encounter with each other prior to Ethan's becoming an IMF agent.
- Pom Klementieff as Paris, a French assassin who works for Gabriel.
- Mariela Garriga as Marie, a woman from Ethan and Gabriel's past, seen only in brief flashbacks.
- Henry Czerny as Eugene Kittridge, the former director of the IMF and current director of the CIA last seen in Mission: Impossible (1996).
- Shea Whigham as Jasper Briggs, a US Intelligence agent assigned to hunting Ethan and his team.
- Cary Elwes as Denlinger, the Director of National Intelligence.
- Greg Tarzan Davis as Theo Degas, a US Intelligence agent and Briggs's partner assigned to track down Ethan and his team.
- Frederick Schmidt as Zola Mitsopolis, Alanna's brother.

Additionally, Charles Parnell, Rob Delaney, Indira Varma and Mark Gatiss appear as heads of US Intelligence agencies, representing NRO, JSOC, DIA and NSA, respectively. Marcin Dorociński and Ivan Ivashkin appear as the captain and the second-in-command of the Sevastopol submarine, respectively.

== Production ==
=== Development and pre-production ===
On January 14, 2019, Tom Cruise announced that the seventh and eighth Mission: Impossible films would be shot back-to-back with Christopher McQuarrie writing and directing both films for July 23, 2021, and August 5, 2022, releases. In February 2021, Paramount Pictures scuttled that plan.

In February 2019, Rebecca Ferguson confirmed her return for the seventh installment. In September, McQuarrie announced that Hayley Atwell had joined the cast. In November 2019, Pom Klementieff joined the cast of both the seventh and eighth films. In December 2019, Simon Pegg confirmed his return for the film, with Shea Whigham cast in both films. Nicholas Hoult was cast in a role in January 2020, along with the addition of Henry Czerny, reprising his role as Eugene Kittridge for the first time since the 1996 film. Hoult was cast because Cruise liked his audition for Top Gun: Maverick (2022) to play Bradley "Rooster" Bradshaw, recognizing him as a supremely talented actor who just wasn't suited to play that role for that movie even though there wasn't a concrete story set for the seventh Mission: Impossible film.

Vanessa Kirby also announced she was returning for both films. In May 2020, it was reported that Esai Morales would replace Hoult as the villain in both films because of scheduling conflicts. Morales was cast as Gabriel because of McQuarrie seeing his role of Camino Del Rio on Ozark; Hoult's recasting thanks to the COVID-19 pandemic with Morales led to drastic story changes since it was after Morales was cast that McQuarrie realized that Cruise and Morales being about the same age opened several story possibilities to tie in their characters to Ethan Hunt's backstory. Similarly, it was after Hoult's departure that the filmmakers came up with the concept of "The Entity".

Angela Bassett announced she would return as Erika Sloane in December 2020, but she was later removed because of COVID-19 travel restrictions. Sloane appears in the film in a photo on the wall of DNI Denlinger's office during an intelligence briefing. In March 2021, McQuarrie revealed that Rob Delaney, Charles Parnell, Indira Varma, Mark Gatiss and Cary Elwes had joined the cast. That day, Greg Tarzan Davis was also confirmed to have joined the cast.

McQuarrie revealed that for the flashback segments, he considered making them reflective of the 1989 setting akin to how a Tony Scott-directed Mission: Impossible might have looked, down to de-aging all the actors and featuring Julia Roberts as the girlfriend murdered by Gabriel. However, he stepped back once discovering how pricey the effects would become, while also feeling a younger Cruise would be distracting to audiences. McQuarrie had also chosen to have Ilsa Faust die in the film while working on Maverick with Cruise, which he had co-written. He felt the decision would show the "stakes have to be real" and described Ilsa and Ethan's relationship as being "doomed to be together and yet doomed never to be together".

=== Filming ===
Under the working title Libra, filming was scheduled to begin on February 20, 2020, in Venice, set up to last for three weeks before moving to Rome in mid-March for 40 days, but the COVID-19 pandemic in Italy halted production in the country. Three weeks later, stunt rehearsals began in Surrey, England, just before a hiatus. On July 6, 2020, after another hiatus, crew arriving in the UK were permitted to begin filming without going through the mandatory 14-day quarantine. The set was located at Warner Bros Studios, Leavesden in Hertfordshire.

The following month, permission was granted for filming in Møre og Romsdal, Norway. That same month, a large fire broke out on a motorcycle stunt rig in Oxfordshire. The scene had taken six weeks to prepare and was "among one of the most expensive ever filmed in the U.K." No one was hurt in the incident.

Filming began on September 6, 2020, when McQuarrie started to publish pictures from the sets on Instagram. The film was shot with Sony CineAlta Venice cameras, making it the first film in the Mission: Impossible franchise to be shot digitally. In September 2020, filming took place in Norway, including in Stranda Municipality and Rauma Municipality, with Cruise seen filming an action scene with Esai Morales atop a train. On October 26, 2020, production was suspended in Italy after 12 people tested positive for COVID-19 on set. Filming resumed a week later.

In December 2020, during filming in London, an audio recording of Cruise shouting at two crew members for not following COVID-19 protocols on set was released online. Cruise was likened to his character Les Grossman from Tropic Thunder (2008) as a result. The response from the general public and that of many celebrities was supportive, suggesting that his tone and seriousness were warranted given the extreme circumstances and burden of ensuring production not be halted again. On December 28, 2020, Variety reported that the film would conclude principal photography at Longcross Film Studios in the United Kingdom, with production shifting from Warner Bros. Studios, Leavesden. In Longcross, which is in Surrey in southeast England, production was allowed to continue under strict COVID-19 protocols. In February 2021, filming concluded in the Middle East and the crew returned to London for "finishing touches".

On April 20, 2021, filming commenced in the small village of Levisham, North Yorkshire, at North Yorkshire Moors Railway, for a sequence set in the Alps in Austria with a train going 60 miles (97 km) an hour toward a bridge being blown up, as a reference to the climactic train wreck scene in the silent film The General (1926). In August 2021, filming commenced in Birmingham at the city's Grand Central shopping centre, with Cruise and Atwell spotted by onlookers. In September 2021, the film's gaffer Martin Smith confirmed on Instagram that principal photography had officially wrapped.

Other locations for the movie included a terminal still under construction at the Abu Dhabi airport and various sites in the Italian cities of Rome (including the 20-minute-long car chase) and Venice.

Filming for the parachute and speed flying sequence took place in the Lake District over the Buttermere Valley in the summer of 2021 and 2022. The fells of High Crag and Robinson were used as launching points for shooting the speed flying scene, with landings taking place near the shore of the nearby lake. The train scene with the motorcycle jump was shot in Norway, with the fight scenes agreed on with the Norwegian government.

==== Polish bridge controversy ====
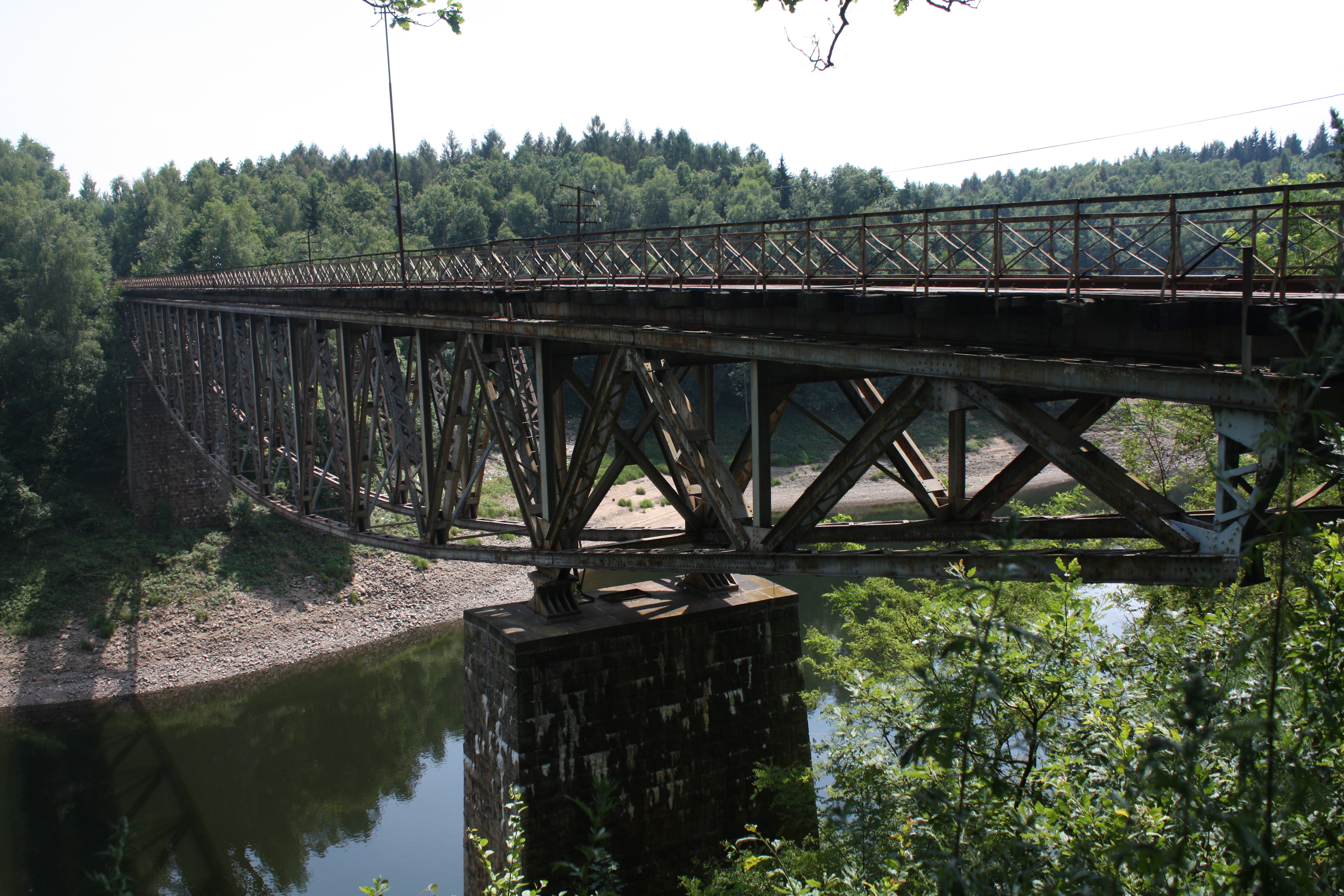
The 1908 railway bridge over Lake Pilchowickie in southern Poland, a would-be filming location for Mission: Impossible – Dead Reckoning Part One that was in the international spotlight throughout 2020.

During the pre-production in late 2019, the Swiss government refused to authorize any explosions for the train sequence in the Alps; as a result, the production team embarked on location scoutings in different countries to find an unwanted railway bridge. Among those asked to help with staging a "full-scale train crash" was Polish-American film producer Andrew Eksner. In November 2019, the Polish State Railways proposed Eksner use a 151-meter-long (495 ft), 1908 German-era riveted truss bridge on Lake Pilchowickie, in the Jelenia Góra Valley, in Lower Silesia. In December 2019, Paramount Pictures producers including McQuarrie landed in southern Poland, accompanied in deep secrecy by officers of the Polish engineering troops. McQuarrie documented the visit on Instagram.

Officially opened in 1912 by Wilhelm II, the proposed bridge survived World War II mostly intact, and was used by trains until 2016. Despite publicly praising the bridge as "extremely valuable," an expert misrepresented conclusions of a commissioned report, that instead of renovating, it would be best to demolish the bridge and build a new one. In March 2020, after the rejected Eksner spread the information, local authorities and museum officials were appalled by the producers' intention to physically destroy the bridge, instead of using CGI effects. The filmmakers and government officials said the bridge was intended for demolition.

By July 2020, history and railway enthusiasts, scientists and filmmakers protested, along with the regional Monuments Heritage Office, members of Polish parliament, and the International Committee for the Conservation of the Industrial Heritage. Activists and NGOs launched a petition against the destruction. As it was long registered provincially, and being added into Poland's national Registry of Cultural Property, the Ministry of Culture and National Heritage confirmed it was pushing the bridge to play in the film, with a "small section" to be demolished onset, before revitalizing the related local heritage railway line altogether. Following the backlash, the General Conservator of Monuments assured "there was no question" of destroying the bridge.

In August 2020, as the story turned international, McQuarrie said there was never a plan to blow up the bridge, and that only unsafe and partially damaged portions could have been destroyed, which allegedly needed to be rebuilt, concluding: "To open up the area to tourism, the bridge needed to go." He later added that "there was no disrespect intended". The production company did not pledge to cover construction costs of a potential new bridge, nor the renovation of the historic one. Eventually, cultural property registration procedures for the Lake Pilchowickie bridge were finalized, effectively preventing it from any damage. In May 2021, Eksner sued the Paramount production crew including McQuarrie and Cruise for breach of contract.

Filming of the train wreck scene was expected to take place between April and June 2021 on a constructed set in a disused quarry in the Peak District National Park in Stoney Middleton, England, with a railway line and part of a bridge over the cliff edge. After two weeks of suspended filming, the scene was filmed on August 20, when a mockup Britannia Class locomotive was propelled off the cliff into the quarry.

=== Post-production ===
Industrial Light & Magic returned to provide the visual effects for the film, having done so for the first Mission: Impossible film (1996), Mission: Impossible III (2006) and Ghost Protocol (2011), with BeloFX, Blind LTD, Clear Angle Studios and Halon Entertainment being the additional vendors for the film. In one of the later test screenings for the film held by McQuarrie, Edgar Wright asked him about a specific audio cue, designed to indicate the audience when "The Entity" was present, was missing from the film, which led McQuarrie and Cruise to create a sound element for it.

== Music ==
In early May 2020, Lorne Balfe was confirmed to be returning to compose the score for the seventh and eighth Mission: Impossible films, after previously doing so for Mission: Impossible – Fallout (2018), but was replaced for the eighth film by Max Aruj and Alfie Godfrey after the former provided music for the seventh film. Balfe's music from the teaser trailer was digitally released as a single on June 23, 2022, through Paramount Music.

== Marketing ==
A trailer debuted exclusively at CinemaCon on April 28, 2022, including an introduction by Cruise filmed while he was flying in a biplane. The trailer was leaked to social media on May 21, 2022, and was officially released online on May 23, 2022. The CinemaCon introduction was released officially on September 8, 2022. Sam Barsanti of The A.V. Club gave the trailer a positive review and highlighted the many action scenes in it. JoBlo.com also gave the trailer a positive review, saying that the "action on display is truly amazing" and praising Cruise's dedication to entertaining. A behind-the-scenes look at the film debuted ahead of IMAX screenings of Avatar: The Way of Water (2022). The full preview was released online four days later, on December 19, 2022. In Japan, the movie collaborated with the anime and manga series Spy × Family via the Spy x Family anime film Code: White. The projects revealed a parody poster, in which the main characters from the anime series replace the movie cast, and also released a "collab highlights video", narrated by the voice actors of the titular Forger family.

== Release ==
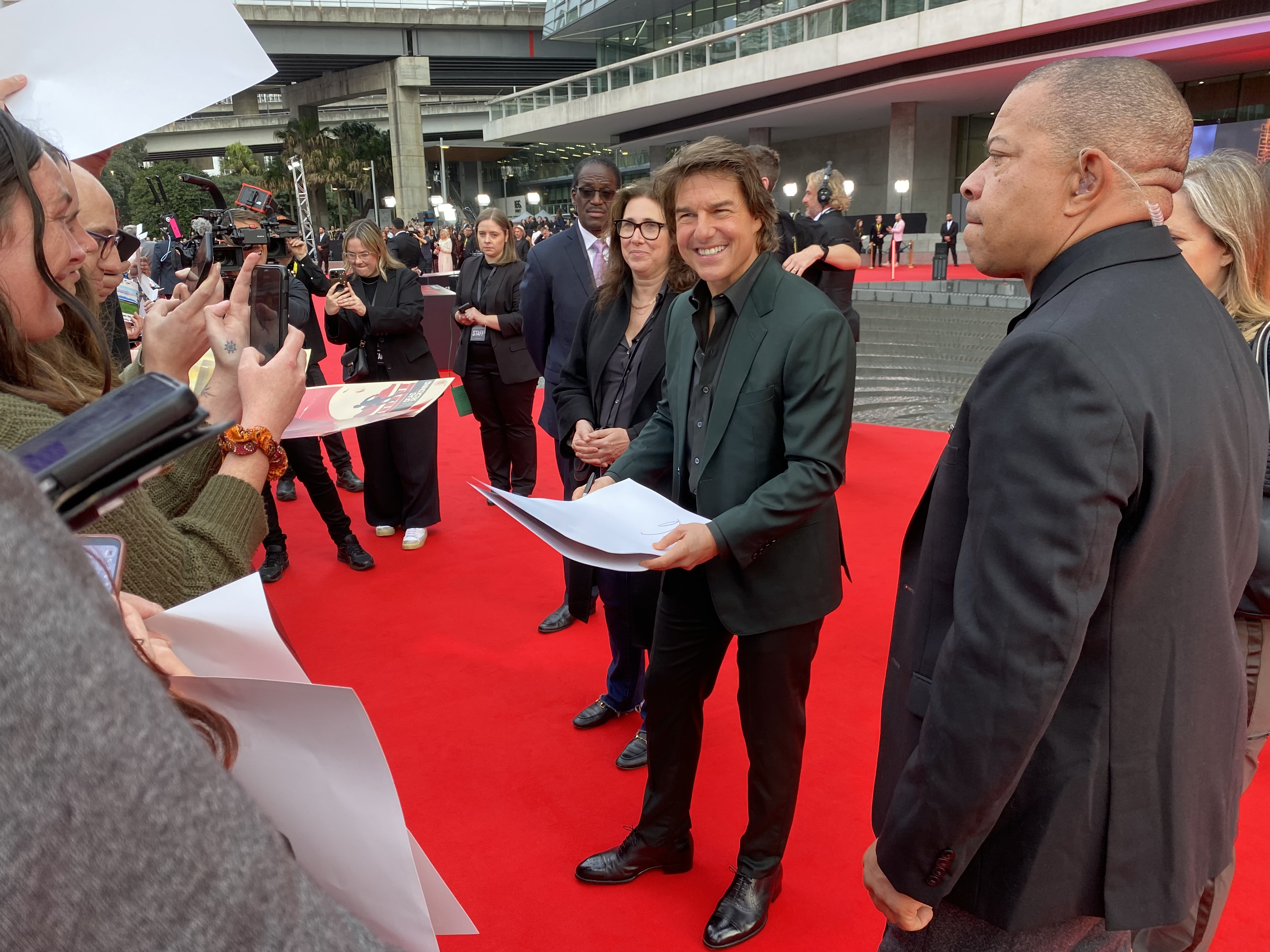
Tom Cruise at the Sydney premiere

Mission: Impossible – Dead Reckoning Part One had its world premiere at the Auditorium Conciliazione in Rome on June 19, 2023, and was theatrically released by Paramount Pictures in the United States on July 12, with special "Early Access Fan Event" screenings held on July 10. It was released in IMAX, Dolby Cinema, 4DX, ScreenX, RPX and other premium formats. It was previously set to be released on July 23, 2021, November 19, 2021, May 27, 2022, and September 30, 2022, before being delayed to July 14 by the COVID-19 pandemic and production shutdowns. In April 2023, Paramount announced at CinemaCon that the film would be released two days earlier, on July 12. The November 2021 and May 2022 release dates were given to Top Gun: Maverick (2022), another film starring Cruise that was also delayed by the pandemic. It premiered in Sydney on July 3, 2023, and released in Australia five days later.

=== Home media ===
Mission: Impossible – Dead Reckoning Part One was released for digital download on October 10, 2023, while Ultra HD Blu-ray, Blu-ray and DVD versions were released on October 31, 2023. The Ultra HD Blu-ray and Blu-ray releases include behind-the-scenes and editing featurettes, a deleted scenes montage and an audio commentary. It began streaming on Paramount+ from January 25, 2024, with Part One removed from the title after the sequel abandoned its original title.

== Reception ==
=== Box office ===
Mission: Impossible – Dead Reckoning Part One grossed $172.6 million in the United States and Canada, and $398.5 million in other territories, for a worldwide total of $571.1 million. Variety reported that given the film's massive budget, it would "likely not turn a profit" in its theatrical run, later estimating that it would lose the studio around $100 million if it did not cross $600 million worldwide. The film was described as a box-office disappointment. Paramount received a total of £57 million ($71 million) in COVID-19 insurance payouts related to the film from Swiss insurer Chubb.

In the United States and Canada, Dead Reckoning Part One was initially projected to gross around $90 million from 4,327 theaters over its first five days, as well as another $160 million from 70 international territories, for a five-day worldwide debut of around $250 million. The film made $15.5 million on its first day (including $7 million from Tuesday-night preview screenings) and $8.3 million on its second. After making $16.7 million on Friday, weekend and five-day estimates were lowered to $54 million and $78 million, respectively. The film went on to debut to $54.7 million in its opening weekend and a total of $78.5 million over its first five days, just behind Mission: Impossible 2's $78.8 million in 2000. While the film fell short of expectations after it "turned out a much lower opening weekend than expected", Deadline Hollywood noted that unlike Indiana Jones and the Dial of Destiny (2023), another near-three-hour film that cost around $300 million and opened to $84 million over its first five days, Dead Reckoning Part One benefitted from better critic and audience scores. Despite that, the film dropped 65% to $19.4 million in its second weekend, finishing fourth behind newcomers Barbie and Oppenheimer and holdover Sound of Freedom. At the time, it had the biggest second weekend decline of any Mission: Impossible film, breaking the previous record held by Mission: Impossible 2.

It made $10.6 million in its third weekend and $6.7 million in its fourth, finishing in fifth and seventh place. After finishing its box office run, it became the second-lowest-grossing installment of the franchise domestically, only behind the $134 million gross from Mission: Impossible III (2006).

=== Critical response ===
On the review aggregator website Rotten Tomatoes, 96% of 438 critics' reviews are positive, with an average rating of 8/10. The website's consensus reads: "With world-threatening stakes and epic set pieces to match that massive title, Mission: Impossible – Dead Reckoning Part One proves this is still a franchise you should choose to accept." Metacritic, which uses a weighted average, assigned the film a score of 81 out of 100, based on 66 critics, indicating "universal acclaim". Audiences polled by CinemaScore gave the film an average grade of "A" on an A+ to F scale, while PostTrak reported 90% of filmgoers gave it a positive score.

In a positive review for the Observer, Mark Kermode gave the film four out of five stars, applauding Cruise for his acting while also praising the film for its "join-the-dots plot" and "thrilling" action. Similarly, Todd McCarthy for Deadline Hollywood and Siddhant Adlakha for IGN found that the film represents "Hollywood action filmmaking at its peak" and that "if every tentpole franchise entry were this fun and finely tuned, the theatrical-versus-streaming debate would be immediately put to rest". Brian Truitt for USA Today lauded the action sequences, saying "it's the first half of a man vs. machine epic that doesn't skimp in the thrills department. Just don't think too hard about it, though you'll probably still give serious side-eye to your laptop." Barry Hertz of The Globe and Mail wrote, "No narrative, characters or dialogue needed. But at nearly every turn, Dead Reckoning aims for something more than the sum of its Evel Knievel parts." In a mixed review for Little White Lies, Adam Woodward complained of "diminishing returns amid all the ambitious action". PopMatters were similarly critical:"It’s all a grand facade, and anxious Bond fans can settle. Despite a slow, lingering start and a Shafferian-tinted script (there are countless references to mortality and mania), the seventh entry of the Mission: Impossible series seems irrelevant."In June 2025, IndieWire named Dead Reckoning as the 60th-best film of the decade so far. In 2025, The Hollywood Reporter listed Mission: Impossible – Dead Reckoning as having the best stunts of 2023.

=== Accolades ===
At the 96th Academy Awards, Dead Reckoning Part One was nominated for Best Sound and Best Visual Effects, becoming the first Mission: Impossible film to be nominated for an Academy Award.

Accolades received by Mission: Impossible – Dead Reckoning Part One
Award	Date of ceremony	Category	Recipient(s)	Result	Ref.
Academy Awards	March 10, 2024	Best Sound	Chris Munro, James H. Mather, Chris Burdon and Mark Taylor	Nominated	
Academy Awards	March 10, 2024	Best Visual Effects	Alex Wuttke, Simone Coco, Jeff Sutherland and Neil Corbould	Nominated	
Art Directors Guild Awards	February 10, 2024	Excellence in Production Design for a Contemporary Film	Gary Freeman	Nominated	
Astra Film and Creative Arts Awards	January 6, 2024	Best Action Feature	Mission: Impossible – Dead Reckoning Part One	Nominated	
Astra Film and Creative Arts Awards	January 6, 2024	Best Stunts	Mission: Impossible – Dead Reckoning Part One	Nominated	
Astra Film and Creative Arts Awards	February 26, 2024	Best Visual Effects	Mission: Impossible – Dead Reckoning Part One	Nominated	
Austin Film Critics Association Awards	January 10, 2024	Best Stunt Coordinator	Wade Eastwood	Nominated	
British Academy Film Awards	February 18, 2024	Best Sound	Chris Burdon, James H. Mather, Chris Munro and Mark Taylor	Nominated	
British Academy Film Awards	February 18, 2024	Best Special Visual Effects	Simone Coco, Neil Corbould, Jeff Sutherland and Alex Wuttke	Nominated	
Chicago Film Critics Association Awards	December 12, 2023	Best Editing	Mission: Impossible – Dead Reckoning Part One	Nominated	
Chicago Film Critics Association Awards	December 12, 2023	Best Use of Visual Effects	Mission: Impossible – Dead Reckoning Part One	Nominated	
Critics' Choice Movie Awards	January 14, 2024	Best Visual Effects	Mission: Impossible – Dead Reckoning Part One	Nominated	
Critics' Choice Super Awards	April 4, 2024	Best Action Movie	Mission: Impossible – Dead Reckoning Part One	Nominated	
Critics' Choice Super Awards	April 4, 2024	Best Actor in an Action Movie	Tom Cruise	Won	
Critics' Choice Super Awards	April 4, 2024	Best Actress in an Action Movie	Hayley Atwell	Nominated	
Critics' Choice Super Awards	April 4, 2024	Best Actress in an Action Movie	Rebecca Ferguson	Won	
Critics' Choice Super Awards	April 4, 2024	Best Actress in an Action Movie	Pom Klementieff	Nominated	
Hollywood Critics Association Midseason Film Awards	June 30, 2023	Most Anticipated Film	Mission: Impossible – Dead Reckoning Part One	Nominated	
Hollywood Professional Association Awards	December 28, 2023	Outstanding Editing – Feature Film	Eddie Hamilton	Nominated	
Houston Film Critics Society	January 22, 2024	Best Visual Effects	Mission: Impossible – Dead Reckoning Part One	Nominated	
Houston Film Critics Society	January 22, 2024	Best Stunt Coordination Team	Mission: Impossible – Dead Reckoning Part One	Nominated	
Japan Academy Film Prize	March 8, 2024	Best Foreign Language Film	Mission: Impossible – Dead Reckoning Part One	Won	
Golden Globe Awards	January 7, 2024	Cinematic and Box Office Achievement	Mission: Impossible – Dead Reckoning Part One	Nominated	
Online Film Critics Society	January 22, 2024	Best Visual Effects	Mission: Impossible – Dead Reckoning Part One	Nominated	
Online Film Critics Society	January 22, 2024	Technical Achievements: Stunt Coordination	Mission: Impossible – Dead Reckoning Part One	Honored	
People's Choice Awards	February 18, 2024	The Action Movie of the Year	Mission: Impossible – Dead Reckoning Part One	Nominated	
People's Choice Awards	February 18, 2024	The Male Movie Star of the Year	Tom Cruise	Nominated	
People's Choice Awards	February 18, 2024	The Action Movie Star of the Year	Tom Cruise	Nominated	
San Diego Film Critics Society Awards	December 19, 2023	Best Stunt Choreography	Mission: Impossible – Dead Reckoning Part One	Runner-up	
San Diego Film Critics Society Awards	December 19, 2023	Best Visual Effects	Mission: Impossible – Dead Reckoning Part One	Nominated	
Satellite Awards	March 3, 2024	Best Cinematography	Fraser Taggart	Nominated	
Satellite Awards	March 3, 2024	Best Visual Effects	Simone Coco, Neil Corbould, Jeff Sutherland and Alex Wuttke	Won	
Saturn Awards	February 4, 2024	Best Action or Adventure Film	Mission: Impossible – Dead Reckoning Part One	Won	
Saturn Awards	February 4, 2024	Best Writing	Erik Jendresen and Christopher McQuarrie	Nominated	
Saturn Awards	February 4, 2024	Best Editing	Eddie Hamilton	Nominated	
Saturn Awards	February 4, 2024	Best Special / Visual Effects	Alex Wuttke, Simone Coco, Jeff Sutherland and Neil Corbould	Nominated	
Screen Actors Guild Awards	February 24, 2024	Outstanding Performance by a Stunt Ensemble in a Motion Picture	Mission: Impossible – Dead Reckoning Part One	Won	
Seattle Film Critics Society	January 8, 2024	Best Action Choreography	Wade Eastwood and Rudolf Vrba	Nominated	
Set Decorators Society of America Awards	February 13, 2024	Best Achievement in Decor/Design of a Contemporary Feature Film	Raffaella Giovannetti and Gary Freeman	Nominated	
St. Louis Film Critics Association	December 17, 2023	Best Action Film	Mission: Impossible – Dead Reckoning Part One	Won (Note: Tied with John Wick: Chapter 4 (2023))	
St. Louis Film Critics Association	December 17, 2023	Best Visual Effects	Simone Coco, Neil Corbould, Jeff Sutherland and Alex Wuttke	Nominated	
St. Louis Film Critics Association	December 17, 2023	Best Stunts	Wade Eastwood	Won	
Visual Effects Society Awards	February 21, 2024	Outstanding Special (Practical) Effects in a Photoreal or Animated Project	Neil Corbould, Ray Ferguson, Keith Dawson and Chris Motjuoadi	Nominated	

== Sequel ==
A direct sequel, Mission: Impossible – The Final Reckoning, was released on May 23, 2025, after being delayed by the 2023 SAG-AFTRA strike. It was initially billed that Dead Reckoning Part One and it would be a send-off to Ethan Hunt or the final installments of the series; Cruise confirmed the former. In June 2023, McQuarrie told Fandango that the two films would not end the series and that they were developing ideas for future installments. Originally subtitled Dead Reckoning Part Two, the sequel's subtitle was removed in October 2023 and retitled The Final Reckoning in November 2024.
