= When a Man Loves a Woman (film) =

- Theatrical release poster
- Directed by: Luis Mandoki
- Written by: Ronald Bass; Al Franken
- Produced by: Jon Avnet; Jordan Kerner
- Starring: Andy García; Meg Ryan; Lauren Tom; Ellen Burstyn
- Cinematography: Lajos Koltai
- Edited by: Garth Craven
- Music by: Zbigniew Preisner
- Production companies: Touchstone Pictures; Avnet/Kerner Productions
- Distributed by: Buena Vista Pictures Distribution
- Release date: April 29, 1994
- Running time: 126 minutes
- Country: United States
- Language: English
- Box office: $119 million

When a Man Loves a Woman is a 1994 American romantic drama film directed by Luis Mandoki and written by Al Franken and Ronald Bass. The film stars Andy García, Meg Ryan, Tina Majorino and Mae Whitman (in their film debuts), Ellen Burstyn, Lauren Tom, and Philip Seymour Hoffman.

When a Man Loves a Woman was released in the United States on April 29, 1994. For her performance as an alcoholic mother, Ryan was nominated for a Screen Actors Guild Award for Best Female Actor in a Leading Role. The film's title is taken from the song of the same name by Percy Sledge.

== Plot ==
Alice Green is a school counselor struggling with alcoholism and is married to Michael, an airline pilot. Though she is lighthearted and loving, Alice is often reckless and, when drunk, even neglects her children: nine-year-old Jess from a previous marriage, and four-year-old Casey, whose father is Michael.

One afternoon, Alice enters their home in a drunken, incoherent state. She dismisses the reluctant babysitter Amy, who leaves her alone with her children. Still drinking, Alice is confronted by Jess, who is concerned for her welfare. In return, she slaps Jess, who runs to her room in tears. While in the shower, Alice retches, calls for Jess, and cannot control her balance, which causes her to fall through the shower door onto the bathroom floor and lose consciousness. Fearing Alice has died, Jess contacts Michael who immediately flies home to be by Alice's side.

In the hospital, Michael and Alice confront the truth about Alice's drinking. They both decide that she must seek professional help for her alcoholism. Upon release from the hospital, a timid Alice enters a rehabilitation clinic.

Michael finds himself now the main caregiver of their home and children, a role he struggles to maintain along with his career as an airline pilot, as well as fighting with Amy and driving her out of the house. Meanwhile, at the clinic, Alice is flourishing; her recovery is painful, but stabilizing, and she is well-liked and respected by both staff and fellow clinic tenants alike. During a family visit day at the clinic, Alice immediately begins to rebuild her shattered bond with the children, leaving Michael alone to wander the grounds uncomfortable and out of place in Alice's new lifestyle.

Alice returns home sober yet guarded – she is vocal, strong, and changed. Michael is having trouble adjusting to Alice's post-treatment aloofness, distant and cold behavior towards him. He has become used to being the stable and responsible one in their relationship and appropriately feels neglected by Alice's newly established and highly prioritized outside friendships. She resents the fact that Michael seems to be out of touch with her ability to cope at home, yet whenever he expresses his love and concern, she shuts him out. Coming to terms with their estrangement, a reluctant Michael agrees to Alice's suggestion that the two see a marriage counselor, who considers Michael's behavior as "codependent."

During an argument, Alice confesses that Michael's clearly genuine desire to be a supportive husband "makes her skin crawl." Michael moves out, and Alice stays in their home with the children. Michael is unable to process the change his relationship has undergone and seeks out a support group for spouses of alcoholics. Initially shy, Michael becomes a more vocal member of the group and shares his sorrow over his lack of understanding for the gravity his wife's sobriety would have on him, his children, and his marriage.

Alice and Michael singularly return to the hospital to celebrate the birth of Amy's baby. They spend time together and as they depart, Alice asks Michael if he would attend her 180-day sober speech where she will acknowledge her failings and accomplishments. She also tells him that she has been thinking about asking him to come home with her. Michael tells Alice he has been offered a job in Denver. For the first time since they both agreed Alice should enter rehab, they both agree Michael should take the position.

Alice later stands on a stage and tells her sobriety story; the toll it took on her, her children, and her marriage. Her audience is moved to tears. Her speech ends and she is surrounded by well-wishers. Out of the crowd appears Michael. At ease with himself and Alice, he explains what he missed along the way..."to listen, to really listen." They share an intense, longing, passionate kiss.

== Cast ==
- Meg Ryan as Alice Green
- Andy García as Michael Green
- Lauren Tom as Amy (the babysitter)
- Philip Seymour Hoffman as Gary
- Tina Majorino as Jess Green
- Mae Whitman as Casey Green
- Ellen Burstyn as Emily

== Production ==
Tom Hanks was considered for Garcia's role and Michelle Pfeiffer and Debra Winger were considered for Ryan's role.

== Reception ==
=== Critical response ===
When a Man Loves a Woman holds a 68% approval rating among critics at Rotten Tomatoes based on 98 reviews. The site's consensus states: "When a Man Loves a Woman delves into the complex dynamics of a marriage shadowed by addiction, aided by strong performances from Andy Garcia and Meg Ryan." Audiences surveyed by CinemaScore gave the film a grade "A−" on scale of A to F.

Roger Ebert, himself a recovering alcoholic, gave the film four out of four stars and wrote, "Here is a wise and ambitious film about the way alcoholism affects the fabric of a marriage. So many movies about the disease simplify it into a three-step process: Gradual onset, spectacular bottom, eventual recovery. It isn't that simple; most alcoholics never even give themselves a chance to recover. And recovery is a beginning, not an end." He praised the acting of Meg Ryan, Andy Garcia, and Lauren Tom, and said one of the film's strengths is "it isn't just about Alice's recovery. It's about Michael's recovery from Alice's recovery."

James Berardinelli said that the "ending is too facile", and that its "occasional didactic tendencies are its weakness", but concluded "the script does a good enough job establishing the dynamics of the Green family that we never doubt that the story deserves to be told. The film's poignancy is its strength...In balance, the former by far outweighs the latter, making this a worthwhile picture." Berardinelli also gave praise to the performances of Tina Majorino and Mae Whitman, and argued that seeing the characters of Alice and Michael through the children's eyes helps elevate the story.

David Denby of New York Magazine called the film an "earnest and highly prolonged counseling disappointment" and a "pushy therapeutic exercise" which, although intelligent, features "endless talk, a stunted mise en scène, and a moral atmosphere of dogged and literal-minded persistence" which "overvalues its own sobriety".

In a 2012 review for Bitch magazine, Christen McCurdy wrote, "It's a rare film that begins its story in the middle of a relationship, and whose happy ending does not depend on one character's white-hot epiphany and subsequent breathless confession (though we get something like that in the final scene). Instead, both characters' roles in the relationship have to evolve."

=== Box office ===
The film debuted at number two at the US box office behind The Crow. It grossed $50 million in the United States and Canada and $119 million worldwide.

=== Year-end lists ===
- "The second 10" (not ranked) – Sean P. Means, The Salt Lake Tribune
- Honorable mention – Duane Dudek, Milwaukee Sentinel
- Honorable mention – William Arnold, Seattle Post-Intelligencer

== Soundtrack ==
A soundtrack featuring the musical score by Zbigniew Preisner was released. The track list is as follows:

1. "When a Man Loves a Woman" (feat. Percy Sledge)
2. "Crazy Love" by Van Morrison
3. El Gusto
4. Main Title
5. Garbage Compulsion
6. Homecoming
7. I Hit Her Hard
8. Dressing Casey
9. Gary
10. Michael Decides
11. Alice & Michael

Not included on the soundtrack but featured in the film are the tracks "Running From Mercy" and "Stewart's Coat" by Rickie Lee Jones, "I'm a Good Man" by Robert Cray and "Everybody Hurts" by R.E.M.
