= Ithaca (film) =

2015 film by Meg Ryan

- Theatrical release poster
- Directed by: Meg Ryan
- Written by: Erik Jendresen
- Based on: The Human Comedy by William Saroyan
- Produced by: Janet Brenner; Laura Ivey; Erik Jendresen
- Starring: Alex Neustaedter; Meg Ryan; Jack Quaid; Sam Shepard; Hamish Linklater; Tom Hanks
- Cinematography: Andrew Dunn
- Edited by: John F. Lyons
- Music by: John Mellencamp
- Production company: Apple Lane Productions
- Distributed by: Momentum Pictures
- Release dates: October 23, 2015 (Middleburg Film Festival); September 9, 2016 (United States)
- Running time: 96 minutes
- Country: United States
- Language: English

Ithaca is a 2015 American drama film directed by Meg Ryan and written by Erik Jendresen. It is based on the 1943 novel The Human Comedy by William Saroyan. The film stars Alex Neustaedter, Jack Quaid, Meg Ryan, Sam Shepard, Hamish Linklater and Tom Hanks. The film was released on September 9, 2016, by Momentum Pictures.

== Plot ==
In 1942, Homer Macauley is a determined 14-year-old who seeks work delivering telegrams to take care of his widowed mother Katie, his older sister Bess and his 4-year-old brother Ulysses. He aims to be the best and fastest bicycle telegraph messenger of the small fictional town of Ithaca, California.

The very first telegram Homer delivers is to a Hispanic woman who is illiterate in English. She asks him to read it out loud. It's from the Secretary of Defense, informing her of her son's death in the war.

Homer's older brother Marcus, along with most of the young men of the town, has gone to serve in World War II, leaving the families worried. Their father has died recently in the war.

Marcus writes regularly, telling them about his life in the war. He reminds Homer that he's the man of the house in his absence.

At Homer's job he has to make sure the telegrapher Willie Grogan stays alert. He wakes him with cold water and strong coffee. Homer loses his boyish innocence as he delivers telegrams bringing messages of love, wishes, pain, and death, hoping that one of them announces the return of his brother.

Homer is envious of Ulysses as he seems fearless and oblivious to the war. Restless, he goes in to the telegraph office in case he's needed.

Katie regularly 'sees' her husband, Matthew. When Homer wakes to a nightmare and the next day when he tells her his envy of Ulysses' fearlessness, she sees him. Later that day, even the little boy gets spooked by a half man, half machine window display. That night, Homer reads a letter from Marcus out loud to Mr. Grogan, saying he'll shut out the world if his brother dies in the war.

The next afternoon, Homer checks in on Mr. Grogan, only to find him dead after typing out one last telegraph message. It is the one he's been dreading since his brother left. Toby, Marcus' fellow soldier, and Homer arrive at the Macauley house to deliver the news of Marcus' demise.

== Cast ==
- Alex Neustaedter as Homer Macauley
- Meg Ryan as Kate Macauley
- Jack Quaid as Marcus Macauley
- Sam Shepard as Willie Grogan
- Hamish Linklater as Tom Spangler
- Tom Hanks as Matthew Macauley
- Christine Nelson as Bess Macauley
- Spencer Howell as Ulysses Macauley
- Zachary Webber as Horse
- Nick Williams as Texas
- Lois Robbins as Mrs. Beaufrere
- Robin Skye as Mrs. Brockington
- Scott Shepherd as Corbett
- Jacob Rodriguez as Shag
- Gabriel Basso as Tobey George
- Molly Gordon as Mary Arena
- Nathan Riter as Enoch

== Production ==
On January 29, 2014, it was announced Meg Ryan would direct Ithaca, a film based on the 1943 novel The Human Comedy by William Saroyan, with Ryan, Sam Shepard, Hamish Linklater, and Ryan's son Jack Quaid starring in the film. On June 25, 2014, Tom Hanks joined the cast. Principal photography began on July 21, 2014, and ended on August 22, 2014. It was filmed in Petersburg, Virginia, and also some opening scenes of the film were shot on the Western Maryland Scenic Railroad.

== Release ==
The film premiered on October 23, 2015, at the Middleburg Film Festival. The film was released on September 9, 2016, by Momentum Pictures.

== Music ==
John Mellencamp, Ryan's boyfriend at the time, wrote the entire score for the movie. "Not one note [in Ithaca] is anything other than Mellencamp. He did everything," Ryan said.

In a May 6, 2016 Q&A after a screening of the movie at Geena Davis' Bentonville Film Festival, Ryan said: "The music is so beautiful. John Mellencamp wrote every note – everything – the tiny little needle drops you hear in the back. He wrote about half of it after I read him the script, and then the next half after he saw the movie. He's just incredible."

In addition to the score, Mellencamp wrote two original songs for Ithaca: "Sugar Hill Mountain" (sung by Carlene Carter) and "Seeing You Around" (sung by Leon Redbone). "Sugar Hill Mountain" is a fiddle-driven folk song that describes an idyllic location where there's "bubble gum and cigarette trees," no clocks, every day is spring, and anything you need is "gratis." Meanwhile, the piano-heavy "Seeing You Around" has the sound of a 1940s standard (the time period the movie takes place in) and is made all the more authentically '40s-sounding by Redbone's gruff, baritone vocals. Mellencamp's band provided the backing on both tracks and performed all the music that is in the movie.

Said Carter in 2015: "The way John Mellencamp and I met was he invited me to come and sing this song he had written for the movie that Meg Ryan has coming out called Ithaca. That was when we became friends, when I went to Indiana and recorded with him and the guys this really cool song called 'Sugar Hill Mountain' that's in the movie. And the movie is wonderful. We got to see a rough cut of it and I was very impressed."

The track "Sugar Hill Mountain" (sung by Carlene Carter) was later included in John Mellencamp's album Sad Clowns & Hillbillies released in 2017 and which features 6 tracks with Carlene Carter: this one, one she wrote, one she co-wrote with Mellencamp, one that is a reworking of a track from the 2013 John Mellencamp & Stephen King project Ghost Brothers of Darkland County (which had featured Carter's stepsister Rosanne Cash), one that is a Mellencamp version of a Woody Guthrie lyric, and one where she does backing vocals on a song which was originally for his 1996 album Mr. Happy Go Lucky.

== Critical reception ==
On the review aggregator website Rotten Tomatoes, 24% of 17 critics' reviews are positive, with an average rating of 3.7/10. Metacritic, which uses a weighted average, assigned the film a score of 36 out of 100, based on nine critics, indicating "generally unfavorable" reviews.
