= The Human Comedy (novel) =

1943 novel by William Saroyan

- First edition cover
- Author: William Saroyan
- Illustrator: Don Freeman
- Language: English
- Publisher: Harcourt
- Publication date: February 4, 1943
- Publication place: United States
- Media type: Print (hardback and paperback)

The Human Comedy is a 1943 novel by William Saroyan. It originated as a 240-page film script written for MGM. Saroyan was planning to produce and direct the film, but he was dropped from the project either because the script was too long or because a short film he directed as a test was not considered acceptable – or both. He walked off the lot, went home, and swiftly created a novelization, which was published just before the film came out. It was the March 1943 Book-of-the-Month Club selection, and became a best-seller a week after its release. Saroyan won the Academy Award for Best Story for the film, The Human Comedy.

== Plot ==
Homer Macauley is a 14-year-old boy growing up fatherless in the San Joaquin Valley of California during World War II. His oldest brother, Marcus, is off fighting the war, and Homer feels he needs to be the man of the family. To make money, he takes an evening job as a telegraph boy, meaning sometimes he has to deliver the news to a family that a son has died in the war. Yet Homer keeps up his normal life, going to school, to church, and to the movies. He is encouraged by his home environment and his loving family, including a very young brother and a mother who plays the harp. His roots and an almost instinctive sense of right and wrong keep him honest and hopeful. The novel's optimistic tone came, at least in part, from starting as a screen-treatment for MGM's Louis B. Mayer.

== Characters ==
- Homer Macauley – Protagonist, 14-year-old telegraph messenger living in fictional town of Ithaca, California
- Katie Macauley – Homer's mother, who plays the harp
- Bess Macauley – Homer's elder sister, who plays the piano
- Mary Arena – Neighbor, girlfriend of Homer's brother Marcus, friend of sister Bess
- Ulysses Macauley – Homer's four-year-old brother
- Mr. Grogan – Owner and old-time telegraph operator of Ithaca's telegraph station
- Mr. Spangler – Manager of telegraph station
- Miss Hicks – Homer's history teacher, who moralizes during Homer's detention
- Hubert Ackley III – Homer's rival
- Auggie Gottlieb – Newspaper boy and leader of a neighborhood gang of young boys
- Matthew Macauley – Homer's deceased father
- Marcus Macauley – Homer's elder brother, enrolled in the Army
- Mr. Ara – Town grocer
- Diana Steed – Mr. Spangler's girlfriend
- "Girl on the corner"
- Helen Elliot - Homer’s classmate and crush
- Coach Byfield - Homer’s athletics coach and bully

== Themes and setting ==
The story of The Human Comedy, including the characters Homer and Ulysses in particular, is based on Saroyan's life, living fatherless with his siblings and his mother. The town in the novel, Ithaca, California, is based on the real town of Fresno, California, Saroyan's hometown.

The book contains several references to Homer's Odyssey, including the use of Homer as the name of the main character in this novel. Homer's young brother's name, Ulysses, is the Roman form of the name Odysseus, the protagonist of Homer's Odyssey. The books share the theme of returning home. Ithaca is both Homer's and Ulysses' hometown in the novel and Odysseus' home island in the Odyssey. The name Helen Eliot (a nod to Homer's Helen of Troy) is used as the name of the girl that Homer loves.

The story occurs during World War II.

== Revision ==
Dell Paperbacks released a revised edition of the novel in 1966. The revised edition is credited to William Saroyan, with several substantial edits that reduce the story to 192 pages.

== Adaptations ==
The film based on Saroyan's script, The Human Comedy, was released in 1943.

In 1943, Nick Hoffer drew a newspaper comic strip, La Comédie Humaine, based on The Human Comedy. It ran in Le Petit Journal, a Québec newspaper.

An adaption by S. Lee Pogostin aired on television on the DuPont Show of the Month in March 1959. Pogostin's adaptation was highly praised by the New York Times. This production starred Michael J. Pollard and featured narration by Burgess Meredith.

A musical adaptation for the stage, which The New York Times described as a "pop folk opera", opened at Joseph Papp's Public Theatre on December 28, 1983, and eventually transferred to Broadway, where it closed after 19 previews and 13 performances.

In 1992, Richard Klautsch directed an adaptation for the stage by Phil Atlakson at Boise State University that featured Randy Davison.

A second film version, Ithaca (2015), was directed by Meg Ryan. Filming began in Richmond, Virginia and Petersburg, Virginia in July 2014.
