= Flame Ventures =

- Logo used since 2008
- Industry: Entertainment
- Headquarters: Beverly Hills, California, United States
- Key people: Tony Krantz (owner and CEO) Alex Spear
- Services: Television production

Flame Ventures LLC. is an American production company started by current owner and CEO Tony Krantz based in Beverly Hills, California. The company was a producer and distributor of Major League Gaming's Boost Mobile MLG Pro Circuit television program.

In 2006, Flame Ventures co-produced the Unstable Fables animated series, Netflix Shorts and animated shorts. The company also worked on the NBC series Dracula. Flame Ventures produced Wu Assassins for Netflix, a martial arts series starring Iko Uwais and it premiered on August 8, 2019.

== Selected filmography ==
Television series by Flame Ventures
Year	Title	Air Date	Distributor
2013	Dracula	October 25, 2013 – January 24, 2014	NBC
2019	Wu Assassins	August 8, 2019	Netflix
2022	Dangerous Liaisons	November 6, 2022 – December 25, 2022	Starz
2024	Franklin	April 12, 2024	Apple TV+
TBA	Spirit of the Law	TBA	NBC
