= Meg Ryan =

American actress (born 1961)

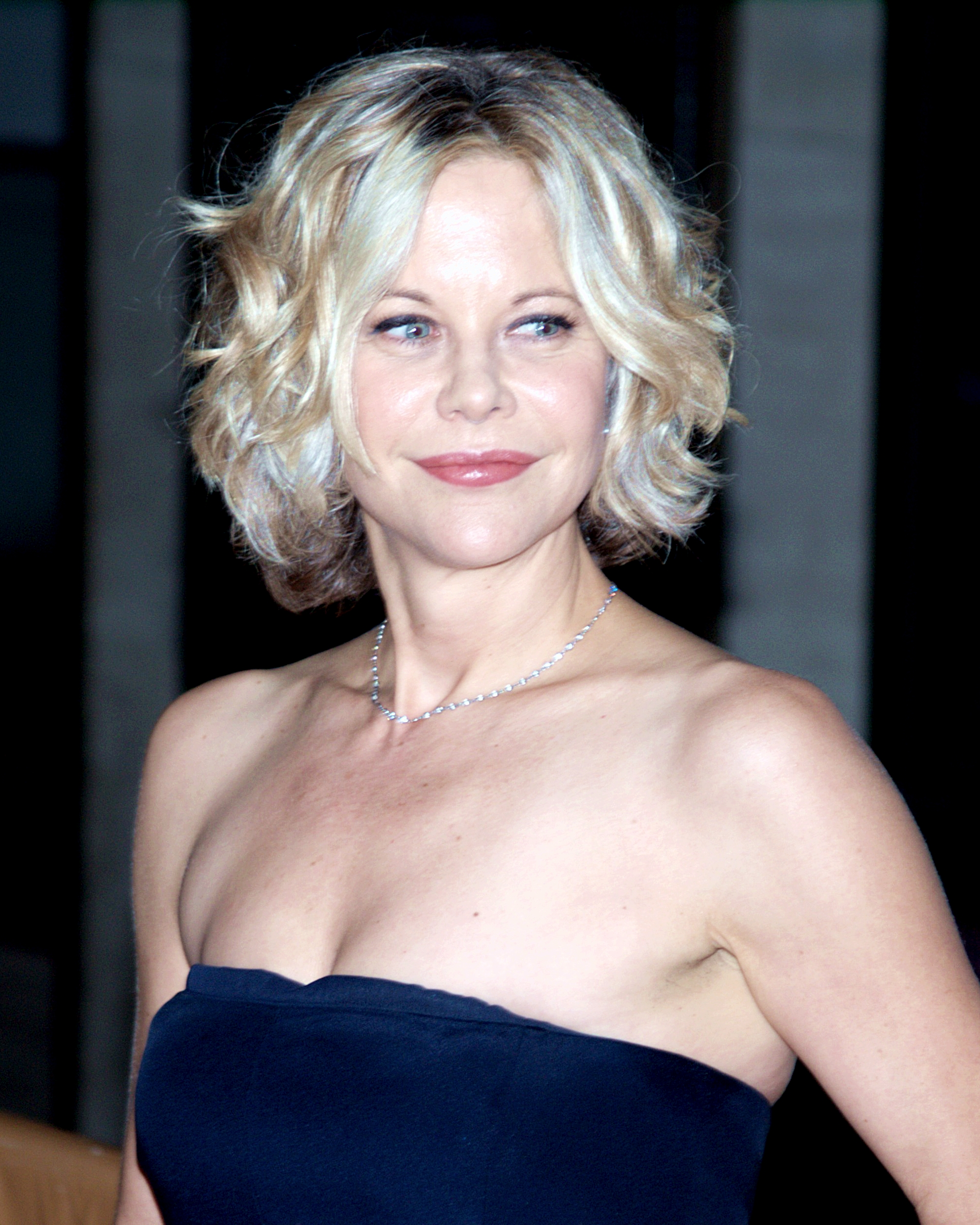
- Ryan in 2010
- Born: Margaret Mary Emily Anne Hyra; November 19, 1961 (age 65); Fairfield, Connecticut, U.S.
- Occupation: Actress
- Years active: 1981–present
- Works: Full list
- Spouse: Dennis Quaid (m. 1991; div. 2001)
- Children: 2, including Jack
- Relatives: Andrew Hyra (brother)

Margaret Mary Emily Anne Hyra (born November 19, 1961), known professionally as Meg Ryan, is an American actress. Known for playing quirky, charismatic women since the late 1980s, Ryan is particularly recognized for her leading roles in romantic comedies, a genre she dominated during the 1990s. Dubbed "America's Sweetheart" by the media, she became one of Hollywood's most bankable stars of the latter decade.

She made her acting debut in 1981 in the drama film Rich and Famous. She joined the cast of the CBS soap opera As the World Turns in 1982. In the 1980s, Ryan appeared in Top Gun (1986), Promised Land (1987), and the Rob Reiner-directed romantic comedy When Harry Met Sally... (1989), for which she earned a Golden Globe nomination.

A prolific actress through the 1990s and 2000s, Ryan starred in Joe Versus the Volcano (1990), The Doors (1991), Sleepless in Seattle (1993), When a Man Loves a Woman (1994), French Kiss (1995), Courage Under Fire (1996), Anastasia (1997), Addicted to Love (1997), You've Got Mail (1998), City of Angels (1998), Proof of Life (2000), Kate & Leopold (2001), and The Women (2008). In 2015, she made her directorial debut with Ithaca, in which she also starred. Following an eight-year hiatus after her career opportunities shrank, Ryan returned to the screen in the romantic comedy What Happens Later (2023), which she also directed.

== Early life ==
Ryan was born and raised in Fairfield, Connecticut, to Susan Jordan Duggan, a former actress and English teacher, and Harry Hyra, a math teacher. Her father is of Polish descent, and she also has some Irish ancestry. She was raised Catholic and attended St. Pius X Elementary School in Fairfield. She had two sisters, Dana (d. 2022) and Annie (d. 2019), and has one brother, musician Andrew Hyra, a member of the duo Billy Pilgrim. Her parents divorced in 1976 when she was 15.

Ryan graduated from Bethel High School in 1979. She studied journalism as an undergraduate, first at the University of Connecticut and then at New York University. During college, she acted in television commercials and the soap opera As the World Turns to earn extra money. Her success as an actress led her to leave college a semester before she planned to graduate. When she joined the Screen Actors Guild, she used the surname "Ryan", her maternal grandmother's maiden name.

== Career ==
=== Early work ===
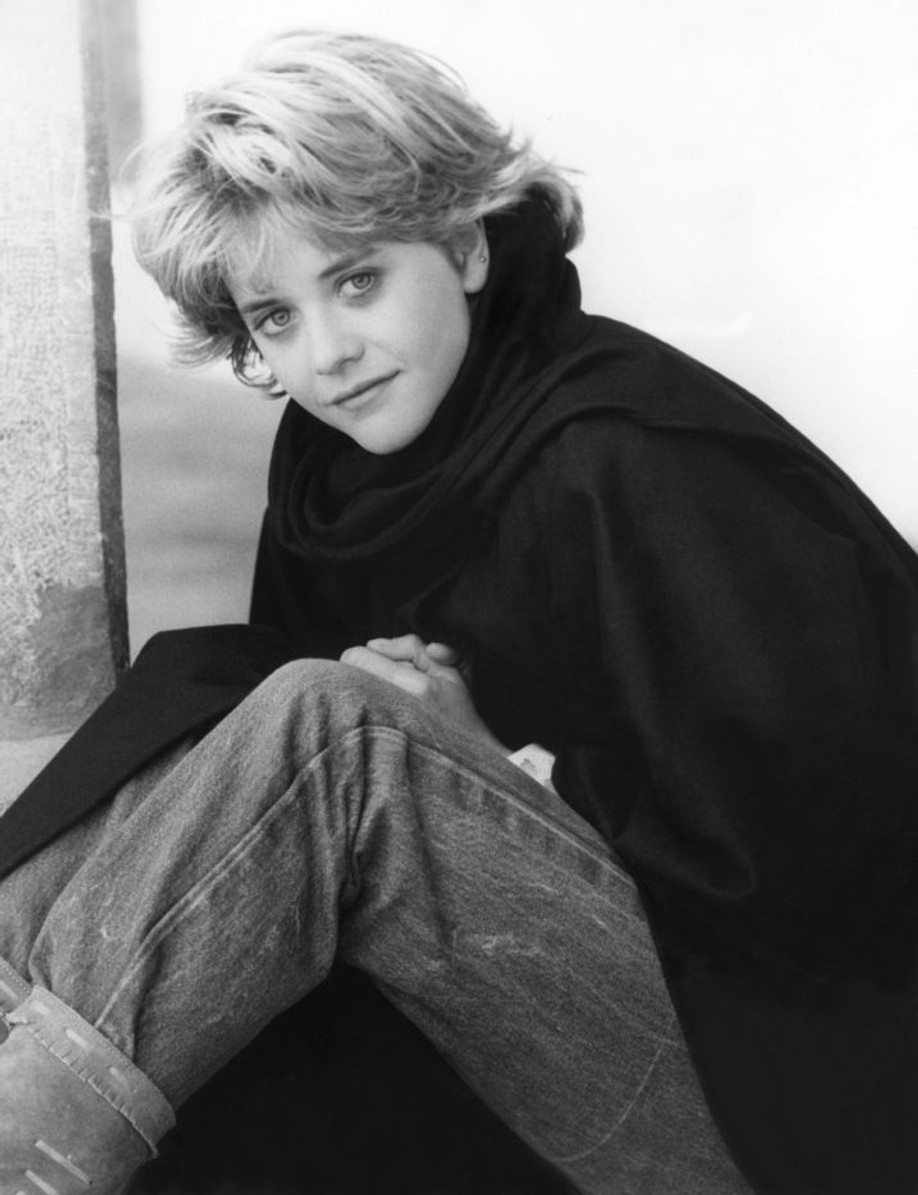
Ryan in As the World Turns (1983)

After her film debut in director George Cukor's final film, Rich and Famous, in 1981, Ryan played Betsy Stewart in the daytime drama As the World Turns from 1982 to 1984; her character was featured in a popular romantic story arc. She also appeared in some television commercials during the early 1980s for Burger King and Aim toothpaste, among others. Several television and smaller film roles followed, including appearances in Charles in Charge, Armed and Dangerous, and Amityville 3-D. Her role in Promised Land (1987) earned Ryan her first Independent Spirit Award nomination.

In 1986, she played Carole Bradshaw, the wife of Anthony Edwards' character, naval flight officer Nick "Goose" Bradshaw, in Top Gun. Scenes with them were reprised in the 2022 sequel Top Gun: Maverick as flashbacks to illustrate the emotional conflicts between lead character Pete "Maverick" Mitchell (Tom Cruise) and the Bradshaws' grown son, Bradley "Rooster" Bradshaw (Miles Teller).

Ryan appeared in the film Innerspace in 1987 with her future husband Dennis Quaid, and they subsequently costarred in the remake of D.O.A. (1988) and Flesh and Bone (1993). She also costarred in 1988 with Sean Connery and Mark Harmon in The Presidio.

=== 1989–1999: Career breakthrough and stardom ===
Ryan's first leading role was the romantic comedy When Harry Met Sally... (1989), which paired her with comic actor Billy Crystal and earned her a nomination for the Golden Globe Award for Best Actress – Motion Picture Comedy or Musical. Her portrayal of Sally Albright includes an oft-recounted scene in which her character, lunching with Crystal's character in Katz's Delicatessen in Manhattan, theatrically demonstrates for him how easy it is for a woman to fake an orgasm.

Ryan next appeared in Oliver Stone's moderately successful film The Doors, and in Prelude to a Kiss, which flopped. In 1993, the hugely successful romantic comedy Sleepless in Seattle paired Ryan for a second time with Tom Hanks. They had previously been the romantic leads, with Ryan playing three different women, in John Patrick Shanley's Joe Versus the Volcano in 1990 — a commercial disappointment which later developed a cult following. (Hanks and Ryan were once again paired in another box-office success, You've Got Mail, in 1998.) She earned her second nomination for the Golden Globe Award for Best Actress – Motion Picture Comedy or Musical for her performance in Sleepless in Seattle. She was offered the role of FBI agent Clarice Starling, the protagonist of The Silence of the Lambs (1991), but rejected it due to the film's gruesome and violent themes.

In 1994, Ryan played an alcoholic high-school guidance counselor – far from the romantic-comedy ingenue roles for which she had become famous – in Luis Mandoki's social romantic drama When a Man Loves a Woman, also starring Andy Garcia. The film and her performance were both well received by critics. A critic for Variety called the film "a first-class production, accentuated by fine performances and an unflinching script," and another praised Ryan for her "roller-coaster role". The film was a notable success, grossing $50 million in the United States alone, and garnered Ryan a nomination for the Screen Actors Guild Award for Outstanding Performance by a Female Actor in a Leading Role. The same year, Ryan returned to type, starring alongside Tim Robbins in Fred Schepisi's romantic comedy I.Q. The film centers on a mechanic and a Princeton doctoral candidate who fall in love, with the aid of the graduate student's uncle, Albert Einstein (played by Walter Matthau). Ryan later won Harvard's Hasty Pudding Woman of the Year award, and People Magazine dubbed her one of "the 50 most beautiful people in the world".

In 1995, critic Richard Corliss called Ryan "the current soul of romantic comedy". The same year she also starred opposite Kevin Kline in Lawrence Kasdan's French Kiss, a comedy catering to her "America's Sweetheart" image, and was awarded the Women in Film Crystal Award – given to "outstanding women who, through their endurance and the excellence of their work, have helped to expand the role of women within the entertainment industry."

In 1996, Ryan starred as a helicopter pilot in the war drama Courage Under Fire, a critical and commercial success. The following year, she voiced the lead role in the animated film Anastasia, which met with good reviews and box office success, and she and Matthew Broderick played a pair of jilted lovers bent on revenge in the black comedy Addicted to Love, giving Ryan a female lead at least superficially different from her usual roles. In 1998, she starred in two films. City of Angels (an American remake of Wim Wenders' Wings of Desire) drew positive reviews and earned nearly $200 million worldwide. You've Got Mail, reteaming Ryan with Hanks, earned her a third nomination for the Golden Globe Award for Best Actress – Motion Picture Comedy or Musical and made more than $250 million worldwide. She also appeared in 1998's Hurlyburly with Sean Penn.

=== 2000–2006: Continued roles ===
Ryan's first film of the 2000s was Hanging Up, a Diane Keaton-directed family comedy-drama about a trio of sisters who bond over the approaching death of their curmudgeonly father. Also starring Keaton, Lisa Kudrow and Walter Matthau, the film adaptation of Delia Ephron's 1995 novel received poor reviews from critics.

The same year, Ryan was cast in the action thriller Proof of Life with Russell Crowe, directed by Taylor Hackford. In the film, she portrayed the distraught wife of a kidnapped engineer, played by David Morse, while relying on a resourceful troubleshooter who makes a profession of dealing with international bandits. While the film became a lukewarm critical and commercial success, grossing $63 million worldwide, it garnered much reportage in the tabloid press in association with Ryan and Crowe's affair. Stephen Holden, film critic for The New York Times, did not think the film worked well and opined that the actors did not connect.

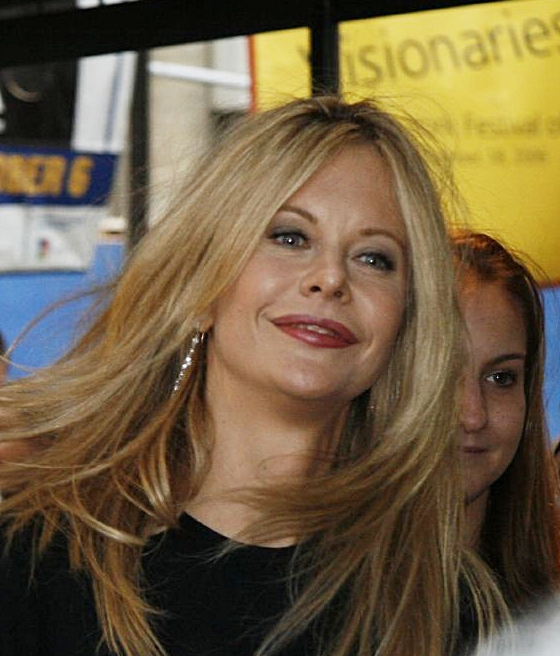
Ryan in September 2006

A year later, she once again returned to her romantic comedy roots with Kate & Leopold (2001), alongside Hugh Jackman. A film about a British Duke who travels through time from New York in 1876 to the present and falls in love with a successful market researcher in the modern New York, the James Mangold-directed film received a mixed-to-positive response, with Lael Loewenstein of Variety summing it as "a mostly charming and diverting tale". At a total gross of $70 million, it would be Ryan's highest-grossing film of the decade.

In 2003, Ryan broke away from her usual roles, starring alongside Mark Ruffalo and Jennifer Jason Leigh in Jane Campion's erotic thriller film In the Cut. Co-producer Nicole Kidman had originally been cast in the lead, but the actress eventually dropped out after five years of development, leaving the role to Ryan, who appeared nude in a lengthy and rather graphic love scene for the first time in her career. Although her image-conflicting depiction earned Ryan and the film much media attention, the film failed with critics and grossed only $23 million in theaters. While promoting In the Cut on Michael Parkinson's talk show Parkinson, the actress was offended by the host's questions and comments, including comments about filming nude scenes in the movie; she appeared disinterested, delivering one-word responses, and when asked by Parkinson what she would do if she was in charge of the interview, retorted that she would "wrap it up." The interaction is considered in Britain to be one of the most infamous in talk show history. Three years after the interview aired, Ryan explained that she felt Parkinson was berating her for performing nude scenes and had attempted to disagree with his views respectfully. Parkinson eventually apologized for losing his temper in 2021, but maintained that Ryan's behavior "played a part in it too".

She continued the strategy of acting against type with a leading role in Charles S. Dutton's directorial debut Against the Ropes (2004), a fictionalized sport drama about American boxing manager Jackie Kallen, the first woman to become a success in the sport. The film grossed less than $6 million in the U.S. and was panned by critics, in part because of its resemblance to other boxing films, such as the Rocky series.

=== 2007–2009: Independent films ===
Following a three-year hiatus, Ryan returned to film with Jon Kasdan's 2007 independent film In the Land of Women. Starring alongside Kristen Stewart and Olympia Dukakis, she played Sarah Hardwicke, a mother and wife facing breast cancer, who connects with her neighbor's much younger grandson, played by Adam Brody. Released to mixed reviews by critics, the film grossed $17.5 million worldwide, exceeding its budget of $10 million. Ryan received a positive response for her performance, with Kenneth Turan of the Los Angeles Times noting it "the best work [she] has done in forever".

Ryan's first film release of 2008 was The Deal, a satirical comedy film based on Peter Lefcourt's 1991 novel of the same title about Hollywood. Directed by Steven Schachter and co-starring William H. Macy, the film was shot in Cape Town and other South African locations and celebrated its world premiere at the 2008 Sundance Film Festival. Garnering generally mixed to negative reviews, it failed to draw interest among film studios, resulting in a straight-to-DVD release in January 2009. In his review for Variety, Peter Debruge said, "The characters seem to be doing all the laughing, while the general public has nothing to cling to but the horndog flirtation between mismatched leads William H. Macy and Meg Ryan—hardly ideal ingredients for mainstream success." Ryan also starred in George Gallo's My Mom's New Boyfriend, shot in 2006 but released direct-to-DVD in 2008. Co-starring Colin Hanks, Selma Blair and Antonio Banderas, the action comedy received overwhelmingly negative reviews, with David Nusair of Reel Film noting it "an unmitigated disaster virtually from its opening frames".

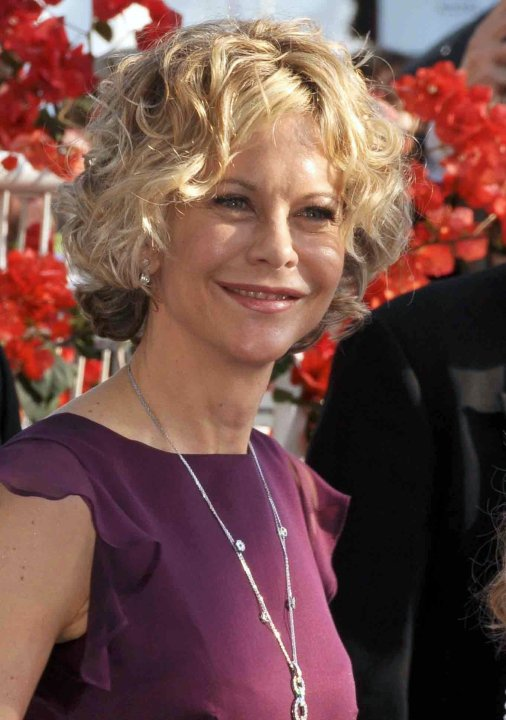
Ryan at the 2010 Cannes Film Festival

Ryan's last film of 2008 was The Women, a remake of the 1939 production. The all-female cast comprises Annette Bening, Debra Messing, and Jada Pinkett Smith. Written, produced and directed by Diane English, the film centers on a group of four female Manhattan socialites whose primary interest is idle gossip, with Ryan portraying a wealthy woman whose husband is cheating on her with a shop girl, played by Eva Mendes. Ryan was the first actress to join the long-delayed production, which had struggled to find financing since the early 1990s, resulting in an independent production budgeted at $18 million. Upon its release, The Women received a disastrous response from critics, with Richard Schickel of Time calling it "one of the worst movies I've ever seen". The film was a financial success, however, becoming Ryan's most successful film since 2001's Kate & Leopold with a worldwide gross of $50 million.

In 2009, Ryan starred alongside Kristen Bell and Justin Long in the independent comedy film Serious Moonlight. In this film, directed by actress Cheryl Hines and based on a screenplay by late writer Adrienne Shelly, who was murdered a year prior to filming, Ryan portrayed a high-powered female attorney who learns that her husband, played by Timothy Hutton, is about to leave their troubled marriage, and decides to hold him captive by duct-taping him to a toilet. Picked up by Magnolia Pictures, the production received a limited release throughout North America only and grossed less than $150,000 worldwide. Critical reaction to the film was generally mixed-to-negative, although Ryan was praised for her "terrific" performance. Also in 2009, Ryan guest-starred on the seventh season of Curb Your Enthusiasm.

=== 2010–present: Directing ===
Ryan was attached to several productions in the early 2010s—including the ensemble drama Lives of The Saints opposite Kat Dennings, Kevin Zegers, and John Lithgow, and Long Time Gone, a film adaptation of the April Stevens novel Angel Angel,—all of which failed to materialize. In April 2011, it was announced that Ryan would make her feature film directing debut in Into the Beautiful, described as "a contemporary Big Chill with longtime friends reconnecting", but it was never made.

In October 2012, Ryan was featured in the PBS documentary Half the Sky: Turning Oppression into Opportunity for Women Worldwide. The series introduces women and girls living under difficult circumstances and fighting to challenge them. The same month, Ryan's audiobook recording of William Saroyan's The Human Comedy was released. In October 2013, it was reported that Ryan would be returning to television to produce and star in a new comedy for NBC revolving around a former hotshot New York editor, for which it again failed to get production approval.

Following another four-year hiatus, Ryan re-teamed with Lisa Kudrow on her improvisational comedy series Web Therapy, for which she filmed five episodes in 2013. The following year, she provided the future voice of Greta Gerwig's character in the pilot of How I Met Your Dad, a woman-centric variation of the CBS sitcom How I Met Your Mother that was not picked up. CBS later passed on the project.

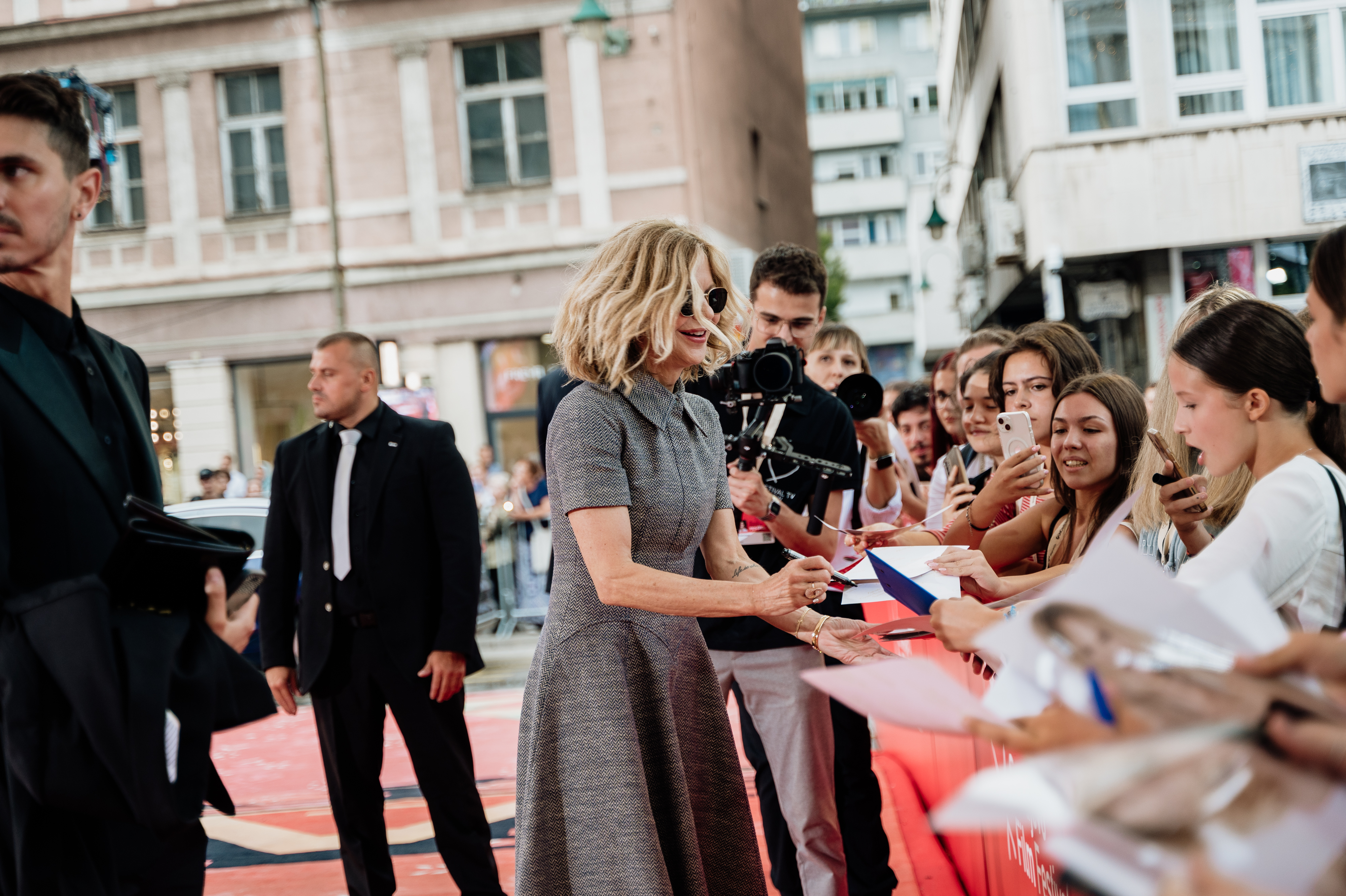
Ryan in Sarajevo during the 2024 Sarajevo Film Festival

Ryan's next feature film was the ABC Family film Fan Girl, an independent comedy about a 15-year-old girl, played by Kiernan Shipka, with a passion for filmmaking who sets out to make a movie about her favorite band, All Time Low. It premiered at the Los Angeles Film Festival in June 2015.

Also in 2015, Ryan made her directing debut with Ithaca, a drama film based on the 1943 novel The Human Comedy by William Saroyan. Filmed in Petersburg, Virginia, it starred Ryan and had its world premiere at the Middleburg Film Festival in October. Ryan returned to the screen alongside David Duchovny in the 2023 romantic comedy, What Happens Later, also directed by Ryan. In May 2025, it was announced that she had been cast in Lena Dunham's upcoming romantic comedy, Good Sex.

In 2024, Ryan attended the Sarajevo Film Festival to receive the highest award the Heart of Sarajevo. She also held a masterclass moderated by Academy Award winning Bosnian director Danis Tanović

== Public image and legacy ==
During the peak of her career, Ryan was one of Hollywood's most bankable stars, comparable to Julia Roberts. She has been called one of the greatest actresses of the 1990s. She was also one of Hollywood's highest-paid, earning as much as $15 million per film by the end of the decade. Ryan is particularly known for her work in romantic comedies, having starred in several from the late 1980s until the early 2000s. The 1990s were particularly prolific for Ryan's work in the genre, appearing in six romantic comedies during the decade. Two of her films, When Harry Met Sally...(1989) and Sleepless in Seattle (1993), are ranked among the 10 greatest romantic comedies of all time by the American Film Institute. The organization also ranked the same films among the 100 greatest romance films, at numbers 25 and 45 respectively. Journalist Jane Pauley, as well as Kate Erbland of IndieWire, recognized Ryan as one of the leading ladies responsible for the genre's resurgence, earning her the nickname the "Queen of Rom-coms". Benjamin Lee of The Guardian attributes Ryan's association with the genre to her "endless source of warmth and charisma, boasting a magic, ineffable charm that only a handful of other actors have ever truly had". Journalist Michael Shnayerson declared Ryan the "queen of the screwball romantic comedy" whose "instinct for physical comedy puts her in a league with the greats—Carole Lombard, Rosalind Russell, Jean Arthur".

For much of her career, Ryan typically played cheerful, witty, and quirky women in romantic comedies, but she has also starred in thrillers, dramas, and action films. Ryan does not feel she was pigeonholed into the romantic comedy genre, explaining that they comprise a comparatively small portion of her filmography, and insists that her desire to explore different genres as an actor did not stem from any pressure to reinvent herself, but rather a genuine passion for trying new roles. Described as an embodiment of the girl next door archetype, the media dubbed Ryan "America's sweetheart" (a description first applied to silent screen star Mary Pickford) due to her wholesome on and offscreen personas; it was a label she admitted to feeling conflicted about. Joanna Robinson of Vanity Fair felt Ryan's early roles limited both the jobs she was offered and audience perception of her. However, journalist Andrew Anthony insists Ryan was greatly responsible for the image she perpetuated, rather than a victim of it.

Some of the actress' attempts to explore different archetypes and genres have been met with mixed results. Notably, her role in In the Cut (2003) drew backlash from critics and fans, after which she dramatically limited her workload and public appearances. The New Republic's David Thomson said Ryan became "widely regarded as that nice girl next door ... who lost her sweetness" after the film. In retrospect, Ryan said they should have prepared audiences for her departure from the archetype she had become known for. According to Anthony Brett of The Daily Telegraph, Ryan's infamous Parkinson interview damaged her reputation for several years. Ryan's public image also suffered from rumors that she had an affair with her Proof of Life (2000) co-star Russell Crowe while still married to Dennis Quaid In 2019, Ryan described herself as a "terrible celebrity" who finds fame to be uncomfortable, exhausting and disabling.

Ryan is particularly fond of movies from the 1930s, 1940s, and 1950s, citing actors Claudette Colbert, Clark Gable, Carole Lombard, Katharine Hepburn and Jimmy Stewart as personal favorites and influences of hers. She claims to have never read an article written about her or her work, describing herself as too vulnerable. Ryan also became known for the shag haircut she wore during the 1990s, which was often requested by fans and nicknamed "The Meg" after her.

== Personal life ==
Ryan married actor Dennis Quaid on February 14, 1991. They have one child together, Jack Quaid, born April 24, 1992. She and Quaid announced their separation in June 2000, and their divorce became final in July 2001. There were allegations of infidelity on both sides, and Quaid added that Ryan's fame eclipsing his was a factor in the divorce.

Ryan became romantically involved with actor Russell Crowe while working on their 2000 film Proof of Life, but also said the relationship with Crowe was not a factor in her divorce from Quaid.

In January 2006, Ryan adopted a 14-month-old girl from China whom she named Daisy True. From 2010 to 2014, Ryan was in a relationship with American singer-songwriter John Mellencamp. They reunited in 2017, and Ryan announced their engagement on November 8, 2018. In October 2019, it was reported that Ryan had ended their engagement.

== Political views ==
Ryan has publicly supported the Democratic Party, particularly its environmental protection initiatives. In 2003, she supported Wesley Clark's campaign for U.S. president. She later endorsed John Kerry during the 2004 presidential election.

== Accolades ==
Ryan has received multiple awards and nominations throughout her career, including three Golden Globe Award nominations for Best Actress – Motion Picture Comedy or Musical for her performance in the romantic comedies When Harry Met Sally... (1989), Sleepless in Seattle (1993) and You've Got Mail (1998).

=== Honors ===
- 1989: Honored as the Female Discovery of the Year with Pauline Collins by the Golden Apple Awards.
- 1994: Recognized as the Woman of the Year during the Hasty Pudding Theatricals.
- 1995: Honored with the Crystal Award during the Women in Film Crystal + Lucy Awards.
- 1999: Honored with Anjelica Huston, Susan Sarandon, and Amy Pascal during the Elle Women in Hollywood Awards with the Icon Award presented to her by Elle magazine.
- 1999: Recognized as the Actress of the Year by the ShoWest Convention.
- 2006: Nominated – EDA Special Mention Award for Actress Most In Need of a New Agent by the Alliance of Women Film Journalists.
- 2008: Received the Francois Truffaut Award during the Giffoni Film Festival.
- 2015: Honored with the Lifetime Achievement Award during the Savannah Film Festival.
- 2018: Received the Leopard Club Award during the Locarno International Film Festival.
- 2024: Honorary Heart of Sarajevo Award during the Sarajevo Film Festival.

=== Awards and nominations ===
Association	Year	Category	Title	Result
American Comedy Awards	1990	Funniest Actress in a Motion Picture	When Harry Met Sally	Won
American Comedy Awards	1994	Funniest Actress in a Motion Picture	Sleepless in Seattle	Won
American Comedy Awards	1996	Funniest Actress in a Motion Picture	French Kiss	Nominated
American Comedy Awards	1999	Funniest Actress in a Motion Picture	You've Got Mail	Nominated
Annie Awards	1998	Best Voice Acting by a Female Performer in an Animated Feature Production	Anastasia	Nominated
Awards Circuit Community Awards	1993	Best Actress in a Leading Role	Sleepless in Seattle	Nominated
Bambi Awards	2008	Best Actress — International	The Women	Won
Blockbuster Entertainment Awards	1999	Favorite Actress — Drama/Romance	City of Angels	Nominated
Blockbuster Entertainment Awards	1999	Favorite Actress — Comedy/Romance	You've Got Mail	Won
Blockbuster Entertainment Awards	2001	Favorite Actress — Suspense	Proof of Life	Nominated
Chicago Film Critics Association Awards	1990	Best Actress	When Harry Met Sally	Nominated
David di Donatello Awards	1990	Best Foreign Actress	When Harry Met Sally	Nominated
Edinburgh International Film Festival	2016	Audience Award	Ithaca	Nominated
Film by the Sea International Film Festival	2016	Film and Literature Award	Ithaca	Nominated
Golden Globe Awards	1990	Best Actress in a Motion Picture — Comedy or Musical	When Harry Met Sally	Nominated
Golden Globe Awards	1994	Best Actress in a Motion Picture — Comedy or Musical	Sleepless in Seattle	Nominated
Golden Globe Awards	1999	Best Actress in a Motion Picture — Comedy or Musical	You've Got Mail	Nominated
Golden Raspberry Awards	2009	Worst Actress (shared with cast)	The Women	Nominated
Independent Spirit Awards	1989	Best Female Lead	Promised Land	Nominated
Kid's Choice Awards	1999	Favorite Movie Actress	You've Got Mail	Nominated
MTV Movie + TV Awards	1994	Best Female Performance	Sleepless in Seattle	Nominated
MTV Movie + TV Awards	1994	Best On-Screen Duo (shared with Tom Hanks)	Sleepless in Seattle	Nominated
MTV Movie + TV Awards	1995	Best Female Performance	When a Man Loves a Woman	Nominated
MTV Movie + TV Awards	1999	Best On-Screen Duo (shared with Nicolas Cage)	City of Angels	Nominated
Online Film & Television Association Awards	1998	Best Voice-Over Performance	Anastasia	Nominated
People's Choice Awards	1993	Favorite Motion Picture Actress	Sleepless in Seattle	Nominated
People's Choice Awards	1996	Favorite Motion Picture Actress	French Kiss	Nominated
Satellite Awards	1999	Best Actress in a Motion Picture — Comedy or Musical	You've Got Mail	Nominated
Saturn Awards	1999	Best Actress	City of Angels	Nominated
Screen Actors Guild Awards	1995	Outstanding Performance by a Female Actor in a Leading Role	When a Man Loves a Woman	Nominated
The Stinkers Bad Movie Awards	2000	Worst On-Screen Group (shared with Diane Keaton & Lisa Kudrow)	Hanging Up	Nominated
The Stinkers Bad Movie Awards	2004	Worst Actress	Against the Ropes	Nominated
The Stinkers Bad Movie Awards	2004	Worst Fake Accent — Female	Against the Ropes	Nominated
