= Skydance Studios =

Skydance Studios is one of Skydance's main organizational divisions and business segments, responsible for supervise and operate Skydance Motion Picture Group oversees the company's theatrical film production and distribution operations. Led by Dana Goldberg and Josh Greenstein, it encompasses the Paramount Pictures and Warner Bros. Pictures film studios and their associated production labels.

== Leadership ==
- Dana Goldberg - Co-chair & chief business officer, Skydance Motion Pictures Studios
- Josh Greenstein - Co-chair & chief business officer, Skydance Motion Pictures Studios
- Kira Goldberg - Co-CEO of Paramount Pictures
- Don Granger - Co-CEO of Paramount Pictures
- Jesse Ehrman - CEO of Warner Bros. Pictures
- Jennifer Dodge - CEO of Warner Bros. Pictures Animation
- Traci Belthazor - CEO of Paramount Animation
- Richard Brener - CEO of New Line Cinema
- John Lasseter - CEO of Skydance Animation
- Jeremy Latcham - CEO of DC Studios
- Lia Bauman - CEO of Republic Pictures
- JD Lifshitz - Co-CEO of Paramount Primal
- Raphael Mergules - Co-CEO of Paramount Primal
- Christian Parkes - CEO of Warner Bros. Clockwork

== Properties ==
=== Paramount Pictures ===
- Paramount Animation
- Paramount Players
- Nickelodeon Movies
- Republic Pictures
- Skydance Animation
- Skydance Animation Madrid
- Paramount Primal
- Miramax (49% with beIN Media Group)

=== Warner Bros. Pictures ===
- New Line Cinema
- Warner Bros. Clockwork
- Warner Bros. Pictures Animation
- Warner Bros. International
- Spyglass Media Group (5%)

=== Others ===
- DC Studios

=== Divested/defunct ===
- Castlerock
- MGM
- Orion Pictures
- United Artist

== See Also ==
- Skydance Direct-to-Consumer
