= Alliance of Motion Picture and Television Producers =

American trade association

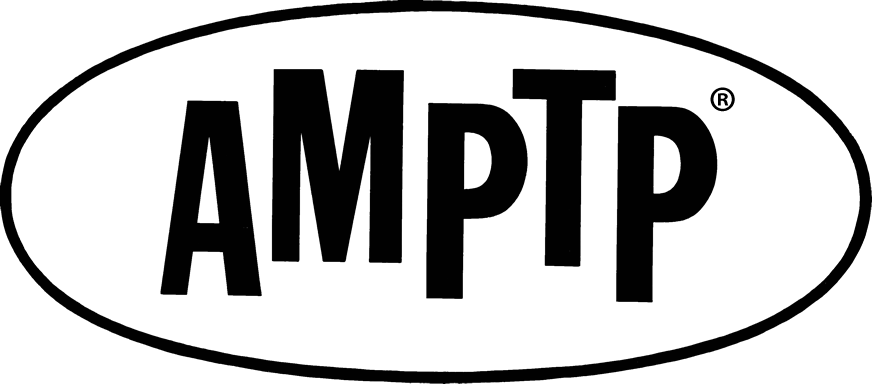
- Abbreviation: AMPTP
- Founded: 1924; 102 years ago
- Type: Trade association
- Headquarters: Los Angeles, California, U.S.
- Location: United States
- Members: Amazon MGM Studios; Skydance Studios; Sony Pictures; Universal Pictures; Walt Disney Studios; ABC; CBS; FOX; NBC; Netflix; Apple; Amazon; Others
- President: Greg Hessinger
- Affiliations: MPA
- Website: www.amptp.org
- Formerly called: Association of Motion Picture Producers

The Alliance of Motion Picture and Television Producers (AMPTP) (Note: Formerly the Association of Motion Picture and Television Producers.) is a trade association based in Sherman Oaks, Los Angeles, California, that represents over 350 American television and film production companies in collective bargaining negotiations with entertainment industry trade unions that include, among others, SAG-AFTRA, the Directors Guild of America, the Writers Guild of America West and East, the American Federation of Musicians, and the International Alliance of Theatrical Stage Employees.

== Overview ==
As the entertainment industry's official collective bargaining representative, the AMPTP, like the Motion Picture Association (MPA), is a key trade association for major film and television producers in the United States. The AMPTP currently negotiates 80 industry-wide collective bargaining agreements on behalf of over 350 motion picture and television producers. AMPTP member companies include the major motion picture studios (including Skydance's Paramount and Warner Bros., Sony, Universal and Walt Disney), the principal broadcast television networks (including ABC, CBS, Fox and NBC), streaming services like Netflix, Apple TV, and Amazon Prime Video, certain cable television networks, and other independent film and television production companies.

== History ==
The AMPTP was founded in 1924 as the Association of Motion Picture Producers (AMPP). It merged with the Alliance of Television Film Producers (ATFP) in 1964 (Note: Founded in 1951.) and was renamed the Association of Motion Picture and Television Producers. In 1966, it also merged with the Society of Independent Producers (formed in 1964). In September 1975, Universal quit the Association during craft negotiations and United Artists and Walt Disney Productions also notified the Association of their intention to withdraw the following month. Paramount and Universal formed a new organization, the Alliance. In 1982, the Alliance and the AMPTP merged to form the Alliance of Motion Picture and Television Producers.

Since its formation, the AMPTP has only had two presidents, beginning with Nick Counter from 1982 until 2009. With Counter's retirement in March 2009, Carol Lombardini took over on an interim basis until becoming permanent president seven months later in October.

Jarryd Gonzales served as AMPTP's spokesperson from 2015 to 2023.

The AMPTP was an affiliate of the Motion Picture Association of America (MPAA). Jack Valenti, former top White House aide to Lyndon Johnson, started his long tenure as MPAA president in 1966.

Other key 20th-century film industry executives who helped shape producer associations were Joseph Schenck, Lew Wasserman, Sid Sheinberg, Y. Frank Freeman and Richard Jencks.

In October 2023, it was announced that over 2300 film and TV producers signed a petition to drop the word "Producers" from the AMPTP acronym (so that it would be AMPT), saying it was "left over from a long-gone era." They claimed that the alliance reflected the views and interests of the major studios and executives, rather than the consensus of individual producers since the 1993 repeal of the FCC's fin-syn rules that re-centralized most major studio production and distribution, and cited that the AMPTP has become a de facto media industry metonym to describe the major studios and streamers in shorthand, rather than individual production companies.

=== Post Production Guild ===
In 2022, post-production workers in New York City, represented by Communications Workers of America (CWA) under the name The Post Production Guild, signed union cards and asked AMPTP for voluntary union recognition. AMPTP declined to voluntarily recognize the union, saying they support "a secret ballot election process by which a union can become certified as the collective bargaining representative of employees". The CWA referred to AMPTP as "anti-union", alleging the workers are "supervisors" and ineligible for representation by the National Labor Relations Board. The group filed for a union election on March 8, 2022.

== See also ==
- 1988 Writers Guild of America strike
- 2007–08 Writers Guild of America strike
- 2023 Writers Guild of America strike
- 2023 SAG-AFTRA strike
