= List of unproduced DC Comics projects =

Current DC Comics logo

This is a list of unmade and unreleased projects by DC Comics. Some of these productions were, or still are, in "development hell" in other media.

== Batman ==
=== Fleischer Studios' Batman ===
Following the success of the Fleischer Superman cartoons, Fleischer Studios communicated with DC Comics over the possibility of adapting Batman. The communication got to the point of budget discussions as illustrated in a letter dated January 25, 1942, and reproduced in longtime Batman executive producer, Michael E. Uslan's 2011 memoir, The Boy Who Loved Batman. It is, however, unknown how far the production of this project went before being abandoned.

=== CBS' Mike Henry Batman ===
Before the 1966 juggernaut that was the Adam West/Burt Ward Batman series, CBS attempted to launch a live-action children's program based on the character. Former Rams linebacker and Tarzan actor Mike Henry was soon approached to appear as the character and even took publicity stills. The project went into limbo, and after a long stagnation, producers attempted to sell it to NBC; they passed on the project in 1965.

=== Batman vs. Godzilla ===
The original idea for this seemingly mismatched crossover between Batman and Godzilla comes from the hand of series writer Shinichi Sekizawa, who submitted a manuscript of the proposal in November 1965. Sekizawa's concept featured several characters from the Batman universe, including Robin and Commissioner James Gordon. To battle Godzilla, Batman and his sidekicks would have utilized several vehicles to engage in combat, including the Batmobile, the Batcopter, and the Batcycle. The concept also featured the introduction of a weather control apparatus, an idea which would later be used for Son of Godzilla (1967). It was also going to have another device to control Godzilla himself, which would possibly indicate another antagonist pitting the two characters against each other. In terms of Sekizawa's motivation, his reasoning seems clear in these drafts: to try and repeat the mammoth international success that the crossover film King Kong vs. Godzilla (1962) enjoyed. This is made apparent in allusions to the earlier 1962 film, as even this extremely early take at the concept included mention of Godzilla's battle with King Kong, which was noted as being included with stock footage of the two titans fighting. The concept never got far enough for a full-fledged script to have been created. There are many questions related to the proposal still unknown, such as whether DC Comics was ever actually approached with the idea or not. It is also not known to what degree the then-recent Batman TV series, which debuted two months after Sekizawa proposed this idea, might have played, if any. Also, references to "Batgirl" are made in the concept, which would predate the Barbara Gordon version of the character that would later become synonymous with the name in 1966.

=== Tim Burton's Batman III ===
During the early development of the canceled Catwoman spin-off, Tim Burton expressed his interest in directing the third installment of the Batman film series that began with Batman in 1989. Robin Williams was attached to star as the Riddler, the film's main antagonist. Also, Harvey Dent's transformation into Two-Face was supposed to occur in the film, with Billy Dee Williams reprising his role as Dent from the first film, after turning down the offer to appear in Batman Returns. Along with these, Michelle Pfeiffer was attached to return as Catwoman, Marlon Wayans was attached to star as Robin, and Rene Russo was attached to star as Chase Meridian. When Warner Bros. felt that the script was just as "gloomy" as the previous film, they decided to put Joel Schumacher as the director of the third installment, leading to the release of Batman Forever, in which Burton served as producer, without being able to contribute ideas.

=== Batman: Assault on Arkham 2 ===
In a 2016 interview, Jay Oliva mentioned that he had plans to make a sequel to Batman: Assault on Arkham, but following his departure from Warner Bros. Animation, the project was dropped.

=== Batman: The Musical ===
In 2002, Burton, Jim Steinman, and David Ives had worked on a theater production called Batman: The Musical. Steinman has revealed five songs from the musical. The first is the opening theme for "Gotham City" and the entry of Batman with his tortured solo "The Graveyard Shift"; followed by "The Joker's Song (Where Does He Get All Those Wonderful Toys?)", "The Catwoman's Song (I Need All The Love I Can Get)", "We're Still the Children We Once Were" (the climactic sequence) and "In the Land of the Pig, the Butcher is King", sung by the corrupt bloodsuckers ruling Gotham; the last song mentioned here was covered on the Meat Loaf album Bat Out of Hell III: The Monster Is Loose. After production was canceled, these songs were released on the Batman: The Musical memorial site.

=== Gotham High ===
An animated series that reimagined Batman characters as high school students was in development in the late 2000s and early 2010s. A similar idea was used for the DC Super Hero Girls shorts and animated series.

=== Batman: No Man's Land ===
Both in the mid and late 2000s, an animated TV show based on the "No Man's Land" storyline was put in development by producer James Tucker. Character designer Coran Stone worked on the project and made designs for the first version, but the project was ultimately scrapped for being "too dark", which led to Warner Bros. Animation and Cartoon Network focusing on Batman: The Brave and the Bold instead. Another attempt was made, and some artwork was made as well, but the project was also canceled, like the first attempt.

=== Batman: Arkham ===
After the success of Batman & Mr. Freeze: Subzero, Warner Bros. greenlit a third installment, entitled Batman: Arkham. Boyd Kirkland, the director of this film, was attached to write and direct. The film would have Batman and Robin facing off against a collection of Arkham Asylum escapees, in addition to Batman finding himself falling in love with a new love interest, planned to be voiced by Angie Harmon. The main cast of Batman: The Animated Series was attached to reprise their roles. Steven E. Gordon also drew some art concepts for the film. The film was ultimately canceled in favor of Batman Beyond: Return of the Joker, while Batman: Arkham eventually became a successful video game series.

=== The Batman vs. Hush ===
A second film of The Batman titled The Batman vs. Hush that featured Hush as the main villain along with the Joker, the Penguin, the Riddler, Catwoman and Clayface was planned for a long time. The film ended up being scrapped. Before its cancellation, producer Alan Burnett had hopes of making one or two more DTV films based on The Batman. A similar film based on Batman: Hush ultimately came out in 2019 as part of the DC Animated Movie Universe.

=== Batman R.I.P. film ===
In 2015, Bruce Timm expressed interest in an animated adaptation of the Batman R.I.P. storyline.

=== Batman: Going Sane film ===
Writer J. M. DeMatteis was interested in adaptation of his Batman story arc Going Sane set in the DC Animated Movie Universe.

=== Arkham Asylum film ===
In 2015, director Jay Oliva expressed an interest in making an animated film adaptation of Arkham Asylum: A Serious House on Serious Earth, but Oliva departed from Warner Bros. Animation in 2017 before such adaptation could be made.

=== Batman Beyond ===
==== Untitled Batman Beyond: Return of the Joker sequel ====
A second Batman Beyond film was planned for release but was finally scrapped due to the dark tones and controversies of Batman Beyond: Return of the Joker in 2001.

==== Untitled Batman Beyond animated film ====
Timm has mentioned that a Batman Beyond film is a possibility, and in August 2017, Tucker said that discussions about a possible Batman Beyond film occurred several times at the studio.

=== DCEU Batman film ===
Ben Affleck, who was cast as Bruce Wayne / Batman and appeared in several DCEU projects, was in negotiations to direct, produce, star in, and co-write (with Geoff Johns) a Batman film in 2015 and was subsequently confirmed to direct it. His film would have been set after the events of Justice League and would have featured Slade Wilson / Deathstroke as a primary antagonist. Affleck stepped down as director in January 2017, and Matt Reeves was hired to direct and co-produce the film the next month. Under Reeves, the film shifted focus towards a younger, more inexperienced iteration of the character while drawing more from the comics' roots in noir and detective fiction. Affleck eventually left the project altogether and was replaced by Robert Pattinson as Batman, allowing the film to drop its connections to the DCEU, establishing it in a new standalone universe.

=== In the Batman Family ===
==== Batgirl ====
A spin-off of the 1966 Batman show was noted in 1967 but did not go past a seven-minute presentation.

==== Batgirl: Year One ====
Batman: Year One's executive producer Bruce Timm and co-director Lauren Montgomery expressed interest in producing an animated film based on Batgirl: Year One, but DC canceled all plans for an adaptation.

==== Robin ====
A spin-off to Batman & Robin based on Robin was in the works but was canceled due to the critical and box office failure of the 1997 film.

==== CW's The Graysons TV series ====
By November 2008, a television prequel series centered around Dick Grayson, with Kelly Souders and Brian Peterson writing and executive producing along with McG and Phil Johnson, was nixed by Jeff Robinov, who decided to develop other projects instead.

==== Nightwing: The Animated Series ====
An animated series featuring Nightwing was in development from Ki Hyun Ryu of The Boondocks and The Legend of Korra fame, but was rejected in favor for Young Justice.

==== DCEU Nightwing film ====
By February 2017, a film centered around Dick Grayson / Nightwing was in development, with Chris McKay and Bill Dubuque signed on as director and screenwriter, respectively. Although the script was nearing its final draft, McKay said in 2021 that the project was delayed due to DC having "other priorities", but also reaffirmed his intentions to still make the film. He also said that the film could possibly be reworked to remove its connections to the DCEU continuity. The project was ultimately canceled in August 2023.

==== Catwoman: The Animated Series ====
Following the success of Batman: The Animated Series, Fox Kids approached Bruce Timm on making a spin-off based on Catwoman, but it was scrapped in favor of Superman: The Animated Series.

==== Tim Burton's Catwoman spin-off ====
"After the traumas of Batman Returns she has amnesia, and she doesn't really remember why she has all these bullet holes in her body, so she goes to relax in Oasisburg. What Gotham City is to New York City, Oasisburg is to Las Vegas-Los Angeles-Palm Springs. [It's a] resort area in the middle of the desert. It's run by superheroes, and the movie has great fun at making fun of the whole male superhero mythos. Then they end up being not very good at all deep down, and she's got to go back to that whole Catwoman thing".

— Daniel Waters on his script for Catwoman

Batman Returns would be the last film in the Warner Bros. Batman film series that featured Burton and Michael Keaton as director and leading actor. With Batman Forever, Warner Bros. decided to go in a "lighter" direction to be more mainstream in the process of a family film. Burton had no interest in returning to direct a sequel but was credited as producer. With Warner Bros. moving on development for Batman Forever in June 1993, a Catwoman spin-off was announced. Michelle Pfeiffer was to reprise her role, with the character not to appear in Forever because of her own spin-off.

Burton became attached as director, while producer Denise Di Novi and writer Daniel Waters also returned. In January 1994, Burton was unsure of his plans to direct Catwoman or an adaptation of "The Fall of the House of Usher". On June 6, 1995, Waters turned in his Catwoman script to Warner Bros., the same day Batman Forever was released. Burton was still being courted to direct. Waters joked: "Turning it in the day Batman Forever opened may not have been my best logistical move, in that it's the celebration of the fun-for-the-whole-family Batman. Catwoman is definitely not a fun-for-the-whole-family script". In an August 1995 interview, Pfeiffer reiterated her interest in the spin-off, but explained her priorities would be challenged as a mother and commitments to other projects. In January 1999, writer John August pitched his script, where Selina Kyle leaves Gotham and goes to her home town of Lake City. The film labored in development hell for years, with Pfeiffer replaced by Ashley Judd. The film ended up becoming Catwoman (2004), starring Halle Berry.

==== Untitled direct-to-video Catwoman film ====
Around 2003, during the production of Batman: Mystery of the Batwoman, Warner Bros. approached Boyd Kirkland to write a Catwoman direct-to-video feature film as a tie-in with the 2004 live-action film. Although the script was written, the project was scrapped after the poor reception of the live-action film.

==== Direct-to-video Joker film ====
In 2016, Batman: The Killing Joke screenwriter and comic book writer Brian Azzarello said that he would like to adapt his novel Joker into an animated film.

==== DCEU Joker film ====
In 2018, a film featuring the Joker entered development. Jared Leto was attached as an executive producer in addition to reprising his role as the Joker, as well as being involved with hiring the film's production crew. By February 2019, the film had been canceled, and a Joker film unrelated to the DCEU was released later that year.

=== The Joker vs. the Powerpuff Girls ===
During the initial run of the Cartoon Network series The Powerpuff Girls, series creator Craig McCracken wanted to do a crossover episode featuring the Joker. On Tumblr, he said:

When we did the original series, I really wanted to do an episode where the Joker came to town and started committing crimes. The idea was that The Mayor was so excited to have a celebrity villain in town that he actually tried to thwart The Girls from stopping him because the Joker was finally putting Townsville on the map! We wanted to use Bruce Timm's designs from Batman: The Animated Series and get Mark Hamill to do the voice. Unfortunately, Warner Bros. said no.

== Superman ==
=== Superman III: Supergirl ===
Producer Ilya Salkind originally wrote a treatment for the third installment from the Superman film series starring Christopher Reeve that expanded the film's scope to a cosmic scale, introducing the villains Brainiac and Mister Mxyzptlk, as well as Supergirl. The original outline featured a father–daughter relationship between Brainiac and Supergirl and a romance between Superman and Supergirl, even though the two are cousins in the comics. Warner Bros. rejected the outline and made their own Superman III film, while Supergirl later appeared in her own film, portrayed by Helen Slater.

=== Black Superman ===
A Black Superman movie was a project in development at Warner Bros. before the Warner Bros. Discovery merger, led by J.J. Abrams and Ta-Nehisi Coates. It was intended to feature a Black version of Superman, separate from the mainline Clark Kent character. As of July 2025, it appears to have been stalled.

=== Superman V ===
Before the failure of Superman IV: The Quest for Peace, Cannon Films considered producing a fifth film with Albert Pyun as director. Cannon's bankruptcy in 1989 resulted in the film rights reverting to Ilya and Alexander Salkind. The story had Superman dying and resurrecting in the bottled city of Kandor. The premise of Superman's death and rebirth coincidentally predated 1992's "The Death of Superman" comic book storyline. In 1993, Warner Bros. acquired the film rights entirely from the Salkinds.

=== Untitled Superman spin-off series ===
In June 2006, during an interview about Superman: Brainiac Attacks, writer Duane Capizzi mentioned a Superman series set in the same universe of The Batman, a possibility supported by Superman's revealed existence during the show's fifth season. Despite this, the expansion was never realized, and Capizzi never again mentioned the spin-off.

=== Superman trilogy by Mark Millar and Matthew Vaughn ===
During an early development of new Superman film in late 2000s, Mark Millar and director Matthew Vaughn planned to make an epic eight-hour Superman trilogy, with each installment released a year apart, similar to The Lord of the Rings. The proposal would have chronicled the entire life of Superman, from the early days of Krypton, where Kal-El witnesses his father's tireless struggle to save the planet, to the finale where Superman loses his powers as the Sun starts to go supernova. According to Millar, Vaughn suggested his Stardust actor Charlie Cox as a Golden-Age inspired Superman "when he was a bit more of a regular person". Vaughn later said that his pitch for a trilogy film would have been similar in tone to Richard Donner's 1978 film, and would have included villains such as Zod, Brainiac, and Lex Luthor.

=== Untitled Superman project ===
At one point, an untitled Superman animated project was in the conceptual stage, with designs by James Tucker.

=== Untitled Superman DC Nation project ===
Animator Genndy Tartakovsky, the creator of Samurai Jack and Star Wars: Clone Wars, was developing a Superman short for DC Nation back in 2013, but Cartoon Network's cancellation of the block in the following year resulted in this animated project getting cut. Early design work on the short was completed.

=== Superman: Red Son live action film ===
In 2017, Jordan Vogt-Roberts pitched a Red Son adaptation to Warner Bros, as an "offshoot" of the DC Extended Universe with different actors for Superman and Batman, but "was told no". An animated film ultimately came out in 2020 as part of the DC Universe Animated Original Movies line. Another filmmaker, Matthew Vaughn, expressed interest in directing a film adaptation of the comic starring Henry Cavill, who previously portrayed Superman in the DC Extended Universe.

=== Smallville animated series ===
In 2021, Tom Welling and Smallville co-star Michael Rosenbaum were developing an animated series revival to the series and wanted to "use as many of the original cast members as possible". He and Rosenbaum prepared a pitch of the series for Warner Bros., and they delivered to them in January 2022. John Glover, Sam Jones III, Kristin Kreuk, Erica Durance, and original series showrunners Alfred Gough and Miles Millar were said to return, with the exception of Allison Mack due to sex trafficking charges made against her for which she was convicted and imprisoned. No production updates were provided following the initial announcements.

=== In the Superman Family ===
==== Bizarro Superman film ====
In July 2009, Galaxy Quest team Dean Parisot and Robert Gordon were set to make a film about Bizarro, but it never materialized.

==== Metropolis TV series ====
In January 2018, Gotham producers John Stephens and Danny Cannon and Warner Bros. Television were reportedly given a 13-episode straight-to-series order for the DC Universe series Metropolis, which follows Lois Lane and Lex Luthor as they investigate the world of fringe science and expose the city's dark and bizarre secrets. Later in May, the series was redeveloped, but no further news came of project's status.

==== Untitled Superman Family animated series ====
In May 2018, Vinton Heuck and Sean Galloway pitched an idea for a Superman Family animated series to Warner Bros. Animation, but the pitch was rejected in favor of Harley Quinn. The characters would have included Kong Kenan, Jon Kent, Damian Wayne, Mister Mxyzptlk, and Natasha Irons/Steel, among others.

==== DCEU Supergirl film ====
In 2018, a film centered around Kara Zor-El / Supergirl was in development with Oren Uziel penning the script. Three years later, Sasha Calle was cast in the role, with the character debuting in The Flash.

=== Untitled Val-Zod series ===
By July 2021, a limited series centered around Val-Zod was in development for HBO Max and was to be set in the DC Extended Universe. Michael B. Jordan was set to produce the series and also potentially star, while Darnell Metayer and Josh Peters were attached to write. Jordan previously pitched a feature film centered around an African-American Superman, only to place development on hold due to his busy production schedule.

== Wonder Woman ==
=== Who's Afraid of Diana Prince TV pilot (1967) ===
A television series about Wonder Woman was proposed in 1967, resulting only in the production of a short pilot. The success of the Batman television series led Batman producer William Dozier to commission a pilot script by Stan Hart and Larry Siegel. Batman writer Stanley Ralph Ross was then asked to perform a rewrite after Hart and Siegel's script was deemed unsuitable. A portion of the pilot, under five minutes in length, was filmed by Greenway Productions, the company behind the Batman show under the title Who's Afraid of Diana Prince? The piece starred Ellie Walker (Robert Walker Jr.'s wife) as Diana Prince, Linda Harrison as Wonder Woman, and Maudie Prickett as Diana's mother. In the proposed series, Diana Prince (not Wonder Woman) would have been the focus of the comedy. Diana, an awkward and rather plain young woman, lives with her mother close to a United States Air Force base. Much of the film consists of her mother berating Diana about not having a boyfriend. When her mother leaves the room, Diana changes into her Wonder Woman costume and admires her reflection in a mirror. What she sees is not Diana Prince, but rather a sexy super-heroic figure (played by Linda Harrison) who proceeds to preen and pose as the song "Oh, You Beautiful Doll" plays on the soundtrack. The pilot ends with Diana climbing out a window and flying away, indicating that, despite her apparent delusions regarding her alter ego, she does have some superpowers. This pilot episode was never broadcast, and the project was abandoned.

=== Filmation's Wonder Woman animated series ===
Animation studio Filmation considered making an animated series based on Wonder Woman in 1968, following the then-massive success of the TV series Batman, but nothing came out of it.

=== Wonder Woman: The Animated Series proposal ===
Director Boyd Kirkland approached Fox Kids about a Wonder Woman animated series in 1994, following the success of Batman: The Animated Series on the same channel, and would subsequently approach Kids' WB for his concept. Although an artwork for his pitch exists, the networks passed on the proposal.

=== 1999 NBC series ===
Lois & Clark: The New Adventures of Superman producer Deborah Joy LeVine attempted to do a Wonder Woman TV series in 1999 for NBC. The character was stated to be "a Greek history professor, a young and very bright woman having a hard time juggling her personal life with her work".

=== Smallville's Wonder Woman spin-off series ===
After the success of Smallville, Alfred Gough & Miles Millar planned a Wonder Woman series about Diana Prince as a college intern at the United Nations Building with Queen Hippolyta as the ambassador of Themyscira.

=== Wonder Woman 2 (2011) ===
There were plans to make a sequel to the 2009 direct-to-video film Wonder Woman, but was canceled due to poor DVD sales.

=== Wonder Woman TV pilot (2011) ===
A TV series based on Wonder Woman was in the works in 2010 that would have aired on NBC in 2011.

=== The CW's Amazon ===
In 2012, The CW, Warner Bros. Television and DC Comics were developing a new origin story for Wonder Woman called Amazon. A year later, the network pushed the pilot back until the 2014/15 season. The same year in May, the show was still in development, with a new script by Aron Eli Coleite, replacing Allan Heinberg, who wrote the previous script for the planned pilot, but in July, The Flash, by Greg Berlanti and Andrew Kreisberg was fast-tracked instead. Mark Pedowitz said that Amazon was delayed because they wanted a right script and interpretation for Wonder Woman. The project was canceled in early 2014, as Pedowitz confirmed to The Hollywood Reporter: "We did not go forward with it [...] it all depends on the script. We were very careful with Arrow, and we're being very careful with Flash [...] these are iconic characters, so we're going to be very careful with Wonder Woman. You only get one shot before you get bit". Pedowitz later said in August 2017 that the success of the feature film has killed any current attempts to bring the Amazonian warrior to the small screen on their channel.

=== Wonder Woman: World War II animated series ===
Producer Butch Lukic brought a proposal to Warner Bros. for a Wonder Woman animated series set in World War II, but was rejected due to the development of the live-action film Wonder Woman, which is set in the World War I. Some of the concepts for the story and setting were later incorporated in the animated film Justice Society: World War II, which was produced by Lukic.

=== Wonder Woman 1984 sequel and The Amazons spin-off film ===
After principal photography on Wonder Woman 1984 was completed, director and co-writer Patty Jenkins said that the plot for a third Wonder Woman film was written. The story arc for Wonder Woman was planned over three films, with the third taking place in the present. Two days after 1984 was released, a third film was officially greenlit by Warner Bros. Pictures. Jenkins was set to return as director, with a script she wrote, while Gal Gadot was planned to reprise her role as the titular heroine. The script for the film was completed in the fall of 2022. Filming was expected to begin in mid-2023, but in December the third film was revealed to be no longer moving forward because the script conflicted with the current plans for the DC Universe (DCU) franchise formulated by Gunn and Safran.

In addition to WW1984 sequel, a Wonder Woman spin-off The Amazons was also in development in 2019. The film would have been set between the second and third film and Jenkins was attached as an executive producer. The project was also cancelled along with WW1984 sequel. A similar project is currently in development for DCU franchise, a television series named Paradise Lost, a political drama about the scheming and power struggles on the island of Themyscira before the birth of Wonder Woman.

=== Wonder Woman 1854 ===
In 2024, Zack Snyder revealed that initially there had been plans to have the character of Wonder Woman in a project with the title of Wonder Woman 1854. Snyder explained that the photograph which Bruce Wayne discovers during the events of Justice League was the story that was intended to be explored first, depicting the character's continued search for her villainous uncle Ares throughout various time periods of history, and the romantic relationships she had while living as an immortal who does not age. The filmmaker stated that the image was intended to give the audience a glimpse of her time fighting in the Crimean War, while crediting Stephen Berkman with arranging the behind-the-scenes layout of the image. Further elaborating, Snyder stated that Wonder Woman's story in the DCEU would have shown her traveling to anywhere in history where there was conflict with the intent of ending Ares' influence on mankind. After the success of the 2017 titular film however, the decision was made to create a sequel instead of another prequel.

=== In the Wonder Women Family ===
==== Wonder Girl series by Debra Winger ====
Debra Winger, who portrayed Wonder Girl in Wonder Woman, was approached by producers to appear in more episodes of the series, including a lead role in a potential Wonder Girl series, but she declined the offer as she wanted to pursue more serious roles in her acting career.

==== Arrowverse Wonder Girl series ====
In the late 2020, The CW, Greg Berlanti, and Dailyn Rodriguez intended to develop a Wonder Girl TV series set in Arrowverse, focusing on the Yara Flor incarnation of Wonder Girl. The CW ultimately decided not to move forward with the series.

== Justice League ==
=== Justice League of America (1990) ===
In 1990, Magnum Pictures developed a script for a Justice League TV show starring Booster Gold, Blue Beetle, Fire and Ice plus other members from the comic's Justice League International run.

=== George Miller's Justice League: Mortal ===
In 2007, Warner Bros. hired husband and wife duo Michele and Kieran Mulroney to write a script for a Justice League film. Titled Justice League: Mortal, they submitted their script to Warner Bros. in June, receiving positive feedback, which prompted the studio to immediately fast track production in the hopes of filming to begin before the 2007-2008 Writers Guild of America strike. Warner Bros. intended for Justice League: Mortal to be the start of a new film franchise, and to branch out into separate sequels and spin-offs. Jason Reitman was the original choice to direct Justice League, but he turned it down. George Miller signed to direct that September, with Barrie Osbourne producing on a projected $220 million budget.

Over 40 actors and actresses were auditioning for the ensemble superhero roles. Miller intended to cast younger actors as he wanted them to "grow" into their roles over the course of several films. D. J. Cotrona was cast as Superman, along with Armie Hammer as Batman. Megan Gale was cast as Wonder Woman, although other actresses were considered for the role such as Jessica Biel (who declined the role after being in negotiations), Teresa Palmer, Shannyn Sossamon, and Mary Elizabeth Winstead, the latter who auditioned for the role. Palmer was cast as Talia al Ghul, whom Miller had in mind to act with a Russian accent. Hip hop musician Common was cast as John Stewart / Green Lantern (a role originally offered to Columbus Short), while Adam Brody was cast as the Flash. Jay Baruchel was cast as the lead villain, Maxwell Lord. Longtime Miller collaborator Hugh Keays-Byrne was cast as Martian Manhunter, while Aquaman's casting was not determined.

Although the Writers Strike delayed the project, the development was fast tracked once more in February 2008 when the strike ended. Warner Bros. and Miller wanted to start filming immediately, but production was pushed back three months. Originally, the majority of Justice League: Mortal was to be shot at Fox Studios Australia in Sydney, with other locations scouted nearby at local colleges, and Sydney Heads doubling for Happy Harbor. The production crew was composed entirely of Australians, but the Australian government denied Warner Bros. a 40 percent tax rebate as they felt they had not hired enough Australian actors. Production offices were then moved to Vancouver Film Studios in Canada. Filming was pushed back to July, and the film was planned to be released in the summer of 2009.

With production delays continuing, and the success of The Dark Knight in 2008, Warner Bros. decided to cancel the project. Cotrona's and Hammer's options expired, and the studio allowed director Christopher Nolan to separately complete his Batman trilogy with The Dark Knight Rises in 2012.

=== Early attempt at a Justice League series ===
An early attempt at a Justice League television series was to feature lesser-known superheroes, like the Question and Doctor Fate, that would have been part of the DC Animated Universe. The series was canceled in favor of Batman Beyond.

=== Justice League: Worlds Collide ===
Circa 2004, Bruce Timm announced a direct-to-video feature film based on Justice League animated series. The film was intended to make a bridge between the second season of Justice League and the first season of Justice League Unlimited. The film was planned to reveal how Wonder Woman acquired her invisible jet, and also planned to feature the Crime Syndicate as the main antagonists, an idea that was originally conceived for the two-part episode "A Better World", until the Syndicate was replaced by the Justice Lords. Dwayne McDuffie wrote the script and Andrea Romano assembled the cast, but Warner Bros. finally scrapped the project. In 2010, the scrapped film was adapted into Justice League: Crisis on Two Earths, a standalone film that is unconnected to the DC Animated Universe.

=== Smallville Justice League spin-off ===
After the show's debut of Justice League in the Smallville episode "Justice", there was a consideration for the Justice League spin-off, but it never came to fruition. Smallville writer Steven S. DeKnight revealed that a spin-off Justice League series was expected to happen after the episode "Justice" and would have continued the story of Oliver Queen and his new team.

=== JLA/Avengers film ===
In 2009, Bruce Timm expressed interest in an animated film based on the JLA/Avengers crossover limited series. As of 2024, no updates have appeared since.

=== Crisis on Infinite Earths film ===
==== Animated adaptation by Bruce Timm ====
In 2009, Bruce Timm mentioned the possibility of an animated film of Crisis on Infinite Earths. A similar project was released in 2024 as the final installment of the DC Animated Movie Universe franchise.

==== Live-action adaptation ====
In August 2022, when Warner Bros. Discovery merger was completed and Walter Hamada began preparations to leave his role as President of DC Films, it was revealed that before these events Warner Bros. had been developing a project based on Crisis on Infinite Earths. The plot would have similarly incorporated the multiverse and iterations of the main characters from alternate realities. Following Hamada's departure from the studios, the project's future realization is dependent on Gunn and Safran's plans for the franchise.

=== Untitled direct-to-video Justice League film ===
An untitled Justice League direct-to-DVD film was in the works in 2008, with a design by James Tucker.

=== Wonder Woman-centered Justice League film ===
In 2013, producer James Tucker spoke about wanting a Wonder Woman-centered Justice League film.

=== Justice League: Gods and Monsters Chronicles season 2 ===
A second season of the series was planned to be released in 2016 and would have featured ten episodes.

=== Untitled Justice League sequels ===
A sequel to Justice League (2017) was in development, with Zack Snyder attached to direct. By 2019, Warner Bros. had prioritized standalone films over the project. A sequel was once again under consideration while De Luca and Abdy were in charge of DC Films, before Gunn and Safran took over. Due to the Gunn and Safran's plans for the new franchise called DC Universe, none of the actors from Justice League were expected to reprise the roles in the new projects.

=== Kingdom Come animated film ===
In 2023, the creative team for Justice League: Warworld planned to develop a film adaptation of the Kingdom Come comic book miniseries, but the idea was discarded by James Gunn and Peter Safran after they were named CEOs of DC Studios.

== Superman and Batman ==
=== Untitled Superman/Batman TV series ===
There were plans to make an animated series featuring Superman and Batman, and would have been an origin story.

== Teen Titans ==
=== Hanna-Barbera's Teen Titans ===
In the 1980s, Hanna-Barbera planned to make a Teen Titans series set in the same universe as the Super Friends. The show would have featured Wonder Girl as the leader, along with Cyborg, Kid Flash, Changeling, Raven, and Starfire.

=== DCAU's Teen Titans TV series ===
An early plan for the Teen Titans TV series was to include it in the DC Animated Universe. This idea was later abandoned in favor of being its own stand-alone series. This roster would have included Robin, Kid Flash, Wonder Girl, Speedy, Aqualad, the Flash, and Aquaman.

=== Teen Titans live action film ===
Around the time of the cancellation of Teen Titans (2003–06), Warner Bros. was thinking of a live action film version of the Teen Titans with different looks, but later on it got scrapped and left behind a well-hidden Easter egg in 2007's I Am Legend, where Will Smith's character enters a local video store and in the background is a 2009 Teen Titans movie poster saying that the film is coming soon to DVD. This was turned into Teen Titans: Trouble in Tokyo. The live action film was in development by May 2007, and Robin was the only confirmed member. Akiva Goldsman and Mark Verheiden were attached to write.

=== TNT's Blackbirds ===
In September 2014, TNT announced a live-action Teen Titans television series originally titled Titans before it was renamed as Blackbirds. Akiva Goldsman and Marc Haimes wrote the script for the pilot. Filming was scheduled to begin in mid-2015 but was postponed to October. The project was ultimately canceled in January 2016. The roster would have included Nightwing, Starfire, Raven, Hawk and Dove, and Oracle. A similar project was later released for DC Universe and HBO Max networks, titled Titans in 2018.

=== Teen Titans Go! spin-off animated series ===
In 2021, Cartoon Network announced a Teen Titans Go! spin-off series based on the song "The Night Begins to Shine" that appeared in several episodes. No production updates were released following the initial announcement.

== The Flash ==
=== Filmation's The Flash animated series ===
Animation studio Filmation considered making The Flash animated series following the success of The Superman/Aquaman Hour of Adventure, but nothing came out of it.

=== The WB's Flash and Smallville Flash spin-off ===
In 2003, The WB was planning a Flash TV series with Todd Komarnicki signed on to write and executive produce it. Inspired by the 1960s science fiction drama The Time Tunnel, the series would have been a loose adaptation of the Flash, depicting him as a fresh-out-of-college Gotham City resident who uses his powers to travel backwards and forwards in time, going on missions. As with Smallville, the series would have eschewed superhero costumes altogether. Steven S. DeKnight, who was the writer for Smallville, said that there were creative differences over how a Flash television series should be handled, given the previous attempt at translating the character to the small screen in 1990, and that the studio wanted to create a Flash who was a "time-traveling college student from Gotham City". As a result, the series never materialized, and the character was ultimately brought to Smallville. At one point, there was a consideration for Smallville spin-off starring Bart Allen, but it never came to fruition.

=== Untitled The Flash sequel ===
Before the release of the film, a script for a sequel to The Flash was written by David Leslie Johnson-McGoldrick, who wrote the Aquaman films, in the event The Flash performed well. The script reportedly included Michael Keaton's Batman and Sasha Calle's Supergirl. Warner Bros. was not expected to retain Ezra Miller for future films because of the actor's controversies and legal issues, although some Warner Bros. executives were open to continuing with Miller by January 2023, since they began treatment. DC Studios co-CEOs James Gunn and Peter Safran said there was potential for Miller to reprise their role in the new franchise, the DC Universe (DCU), but a decision on the character had not been made. Gunn said that The Flash resets the continuity of the DCEU and, alongside Aquaman and the Lost Kingdom, leads into the DCU's first film, Superman (2025). Andy and Barbara Muschietti wanted to make a sequel, have Miller return in his role, and wanted to feature Eobard Thawne / Reverse-Flash as an antagonist for a sequel, while also confirming that the character was responsible for Nora Allen's death in this film. The Flash was released in June 2023 and performed below expectations at the box-office, which led many commentators to question and doubt the prospects of a sequel being made, and in October 2023, Variety reported that no actors from Zack Snyder's DCEU films, including Miller, would reprise their roles in the DCU.

=== Brash Entertainment The Flash ===
In 2008, Brash Entertainment began developing a The Flash game for multiple platforms (Playstation 3 and Xbox 360), the game's story would be written by Marv Wolfman with around 15 chapters each consisting of a member of the Rogue Gallery (Captain Boomerang, Weather Wizard, Murmur, Pied Piper, Captain Cold, Tar Pit, Mirror Master, the Top, and Abra Kadabra). At the end, it would be revealed that a mysterious character who would be helping the player throughout the game was secretly the Reverse Flash, who would join Gorilla Grodd and fight the Flash inside the Speed Force. It would be an open world and would originally be set in fictional cities across the United States, such as Gotham City, but due to project limitations, it was reduced to just Central City and Keystone City. Wally West would be The Flash and would have a multiplayer system of up to four players with several other characters, including: (Jay Garrick, Max Mercury, John Fox, Bart Allen, Jesse Quick, Kid Flash, The Rival, Reverse-Flash and Superman). The game would also have a morality system in secondary missions that would make the population start building statues to the Flash in his honor, which would culminate in the creation of the Flash Museum and would also have a system of unlocking combos and abilities for being a Flash at the beginning of his career. The game was canceled due to the bankruptcy of Brash Entertainment, which could no longer continue the project.

=== Warner Bros Games. Montréal The Flash ===
In 2023, after the release of Gotham Knights, Warner Bros. Games Montréal began looking for ideas for other DC-based games, and one of their favorites was a pitch for a Flash game. However, due to the negative reception of The Flash film, the concept was canceled.

== Plastic Man ==
=== Early attempts of a live-action Plastic Man film ===
A live-action feature film featuring Plastic Man was in the works in 1992. It would have been produced by Amblin Entertainment, Warner Bros., and DreamWorks SKG, written by The Wachowskis, and to be directed by Brian Spicer, following the success of 1989's Batman. Nothing was made official until 14 years later, following the box-office disaster of The Wachowskis's Speed Racer, they decided to resurrect the old script and make the film with a release date set for December 2009. Both Jim Carrey and Bruce Campbell were considered for the role, until Keanu Reeves was announced to play Plastic Man. Nothing came out of this proposed 2009 film either. In 2013, rumors began to spread that David Tennant would play Plastic Man in the 2017 Justice League film as a comical character, something that The Flash's role in the film is. Later in December 2018, a new development of a Plastic Man film was put as part of DC Extended Universe, with Amanda Idoko instead writing the screenplay and Robert Shaye executive producing. Cat Vasko was later hired to do a rewrite of her screenplay, now reworked as a female-centered film.

=== Plastic Man animated film ===
Filmmaker and comic book writer Kevin Smith mentioned at Calgary Comic and Entertainment Expo that he met with Geoff Johns and pitched an animated Plastic Man film that he wrote for DC. There have been no further developments since. Jim Parsons was set to voice the character before the film got scrapped.

=== Plastic Man TV series by other studios ===
Before the release of The Plastic Man Comedy/Adventure Show by Ruby-Spears Productions in 1979, several attempts to make a TV series based on Plastic Man were in development, one being in 1967 at Hal Seeger Productions, and another at Filmation.

Another Plastic Man series was attempted in 2006 when Warner Bros. Animation and Cartoon Network commissioned an animated pilot titled "Puddle Trouble". They ultimately decided not to pick it up as a series, but the pilot can be seen on the Plastic Man: The Complete Collection DVD set.

== Aquaman ==
=== Aquaman animated film ===
An animated film based on Aquaman was first mentioned by Bruce Timm in 2010, but was canceled due to marketing concerns. Filmmaker Adam Green even wrote a screenplay to Aquaman.

=== Early attempts of an Aquaman live action film ===
In 2003, Sunrise Entertainment made plans to produce an Aquaman film with Warner Bros., with first-time writer Ben Grant set to write the screenplay. Nothing came out of this. A year later, Leonardo DiCaprio signed on to the project that would have been produced by his production company, Appian Way Productions, but nothing came out of this either.

=== DCEU Black Manta spin-off film ===
In 2019, Warner Bros. announced a horror-themed spin-off from Aquaman focusing on the villainous Trench kingdom. Peter Safran and James Wan were set to produce, with Noah Gardner and Aidan Fitzgerald writing the script. The film was planned to have a lower production budget than other DCEU films and was expected to be released before Aquaman and the Lost Kingdom. In April 2021, the project was canceled, though Warner Bros. said that it could be revived in the future. In October, Wan revealed that the initially announced name of The Trench was a working title, to misdirect the audience that the film was secretly centered on Black Manta.

=== Aqualad TV series ===
An Aqualad live-action series for HBO Max starring Jake Hyde was in development since 2022, with Charlize Theron, A.J. Dix, Beth Kono, and Andrew Haas of Denver & Delilah Films attached as executive producers. No production updates were provided following an announcement.

== Green Lantern ==
=== Green Lantern: First Flight sequel ===
There were plans to make a sequel to Green Lantern: First Flight, but nothing came of it due to poor DVD sales.

=== Green Lantern (2011) sequels ===
Green Lantern, directed by Martin Campbell and released in 2011, was initially planned to be the first part of the trilogy, in addition to being the first entry of a new DC film series. Warner Bros. commissioned a script for a sequel from Greg Berlanti, Michael Green, and Marc Guggenheim while filming for the first film was underway. Michael Goldenberg was also attached to write the screenplay, based on the sequel treatment. The scene in the film's end credits showing Sinestro becoming a Yellow Lantern teased the planned sequel. The plans were cancelled due to the film's negative reviews and disappointing box office run.

=== DCEU Green Lantern reboot ===
Following the release of Man of Steel in 2013, which became the first film in the DC Extended Universe, a new version of the Green Lantern was expected to be featured in that franchise. Warner Bros. planned to release a solo Green Lantern film titled Green Lantern Corps, with an original release date of June 19, 2020, and with Hal Jordan and John Stewart as Green Lanterns in the film. In 2017, David S. Goyer and Justin Rhodes were attached to write the film's script and to produce the film, with Geoff Johns and Jon Berg as executive producers. In March 2021, after the release of Zack Snyder's Justice League, the director's cut of Justice League, Zack Snyder revealed that a scrapped idea for the film had Batman meeting up with the Green Lantern Corps, with Ryan Reynolds appearing as an "additional lantern... to fill out the corps a bit", but he never spoke with Reynolds about this. The project was later repurposed for DC Universe franchise in the form of television series, titled Lanterns.

=== Green Lantern series by Greg Berlanti ===
A 10 one-hour episodic Green Lantern television series separate from the film was in development for HBO Max from Marc Guggenheim and Seth Grahame-Smith with Berlanti Productions producing the series. The series was to focus on the Guy Gardner, Jessica Cruz, Simon Baz, and Alan Scott versions of Green Lantern alongside Sinestro and Kilowog. The version with Berlanti was later cancelled, with this new series focusing on Hal Jordan and John Stewart as part of DC Studios' new shared universe.

=== Sinestro Corps War animated film ===
DC's executive editor Dan DiDio has expressed interest in seeing Sinestro Corps War comic storyline adapted into an animated film.

== Green Arrow ==
=== Filmation's Green Arrow animated series ===
In the 1960s, studio Filmation considered making a Green Arrow animated series following the success of The Superman/Aquaman Hour of Adventure, but it did not come to fruition.

=== Green Arrow series ===
In 1990, according to TV Guide magazine at the time, a Green Arrow live-action series was in development, and was in the planning stages as of 1994 with a pilot script by Michael Nankin, but nothing came of it.

=== Green Arrow: Escape from Super Max ===
David S. Goyer and Justin Marks penned a script for a film starring Green Arrow originally called Super Max; the film was retitled Green Arrow: Escape from Super Max by June 2008. The reported storyline stated that the hero, who was framed for a crime he did not commit, must escape a high-security prison filled with villains and rogue superheroes. Black Canary was not in the script, and film would have included cameos from the Riddler, Lex Luthor, and the Joker.

Elements of the script were adapted for the seventh season of Arrow, where Oliver Queen is locked in the Slabside Maximum Security Prison after being outed as the Green Arrow.

=== Untitled Green Arrow animated film ===
Bruce Timm has said that he would like to do a Green Arrow film.

=== Smallville Green Arrow spin-off ===
During the sixth season of Smallville there was talk of spinning off the Green Arrow into his own series, but Justin Hartley refused to talk about the possibility of it because of his role on Smallville. The actor felt it was his duty to respect what the show had accomplished in five seasons, and not "steal the spotlight" because there was "talk" of a spin-off after his two appearances. According to Hartley, "talking" was as far as the spin-off idea ever got. Alfred Gough said that the Green Arrow spin-off would have introduced the idea of Oliver acting in more of a "Professor X" role, where he takes in people with superpowers who have no place to go and trains them. The show's writer Steven S. DeKnight clarified that the series would have featured the introduction of new characters—such as Teen Titans and others from the DC Comics universe—as well as going into more depth for the background story of its primary characters, like Bart, Victor, and Arthur. As with the other potential series, this one never came to fruition.

=== Arrow spin-off Green Arrow & the Canaries ===
In 2019, a spin-off of Arrow was in development. It was to be a female-led spin-off series, with Katherine McNamara, Katie Cassidy, and Juliana Harkavy as the leads, reprising their roles from Arrow. An episode of Arrow's final season was to serve as a backdoor pilot for the potential series. Filming for the backdoor pilot began on October 21, with its title, along with the series, being named Green Arrow and the Canaries. No progress on the proposal was made and in January 2021, The CW officially passed on the spin-off; Marc Guggenheim said this decision was made at the beginning of the COVID-19 pandemic, and that it was the "deciding factor" in not moving forward with the series. Having the series move to HBO Max was also reportedly "thoroughly explored", which was another contributing factor to the length of time it took to officially announce its cancellation.

== Cyborg ==
=== Cyborg TV series ===
A planned Cyborg series was in development in the 2010s. At some point, Drake was considered for the starring role.

=== DCEU Cyborg film ===
A solo Cyborg film in the DC Extended Universe was announced in October 2014, with Ray Fisher set to reprise his role from the then upcoming Batman v Superman: Dawn of Justice. Joe Morton was also set to reprise his role as Silas Stone. Though the film was consistently stated to be in production until 2020, by 2021, amidst a dispute between Ray Fisher and Warner Bros. Pictures regarding an investigation in the reshoot process on Justice League, Fisher said that he would not play the role in any film that has then President of DC Films Walter Hamada's involvement. DC Films responded that they will not recast the role. Variety later reported that Fisher will not reprise the role, along with other Justice League cast members in the DC Universe franchise.

== Deadman ==
=== Deadman film ===
Guillermo del Toro has taken interest in producing a film based on Deadman, supposedly from the only source. Nikolaj Arcel was set to direct the film. Since then, no updates have emerged for the project.

=== Deadman TV series ===
Following the success of X-Men in 2000, Warner Bros. Television began to develop a Deadman television film for TNT, also acting as a pilot for a potential television series. The project was still in development by 2003, but was later shelved. In 2011, WBTV hired Supernatural creator Eric Kripke to helm a Deadman television series for The CW, as the network was looking to commission a new superhero series. The following year, another superhero series debuted on the network. A Deadman series never materialized, and Kripke has since moved on to other projects.

== Rōnin ==
=== Rōnin film ===
In 1998, Darren Aronofsky signed a deal with New Line Cinema for a film adaptation of the graphic novel Rōnin. In 2007, Gianni Nunnari, producer of 300, was attached to produce and Sylvain White, director of Stomp the Yard, was hired to direct the Rōnin film adaptation. No further news came after its announcement.

=== Rōnin TV miniseries ===
In April 2014, the Syfy channel revealed its intention to adapt Rōnin into a miniseries. No further news came after its announcement.

== Static ==
=== Static Shock TV series ===
In October 2014, Warner Bros. intended to launch a live-action Static Shock program from Reginald Hudlin as part of the company's new Blue Ribbon Content digital division, and were eyeing Jaden Smith for the role of Virgil Hawkins/Static. Actor Tyler James Williams said in the following year that Smith was cast as Static, but was not confirmed by Blue Ribbon Content or Warner Bros. Hudlin, DC Comics Chief Creative Officer Geoff Johns, and Static co-creator Denys Cowan were collaborating on the live-action project. Since then, there have been no new announcements.

=== Static animated direct-to-video film ===
In 2017, when asked if the character could have a feature film set in the DC Animated Universe as part of the DC Universe Animated Original Movies line, producer James Tucker responded that there was interest in Static at the studio. There have been no further discussions for such a project.

=== DCEU Static Shock film ===
A live-action film centered around Static was in development since August 2020, with Michael B. Jordan joining the production team as a producer alongside Reginald Hudlin in October. Several months later, Randy McKinnon was hired as screenwriter.

=== Milestone animated film ===
An animated film featuring characters from the Milestone Media imprint was announced in October 2021. The film was set to be written by Brandon Thomas and feature "more than one character," according to Milestone co-founder Denys Cowan. The announcement included promotional concept art of Static, Hardware, Icon, and Rocket. No production updates were provided since then.

=== Static Shock Spin-Offs ===
Dwayne McDuffie it was pitched and attempted to create a spin-off show for Gear and Shebang, but nothing came of it.

== Lobo ==
=== Comedic Lobo film ===
In the late 1990s, writer Jerrold E. Brown was writing a comedy film about Lobo with Joel Silver attached as producer.

=== Lobo: The Animated Series ===
Following his appearance on Superman: The Animated Series, a children's television show based on Lobo was in development at Kids WB. Due to executive issues, the series was converted into an adult-oriented Flash animated web series that was released in 2000.

=== Lobo TV series spin-off ===
Syfy announced a Lobo spin-off series from season 2 of Krypton in June 2019, with Krypton executive producer Cameron Welsh serving as executive producer/writer. Two months later, Syfy canceled the Lobo spin-off along with Krypton.

=== Lobo & Crush ===
Olan Rogers pitched an adult animated series based on Lobo and his daughter Crush to WB in 2020 before it was scrapped year later in September.

=== DCEU Lobo film ===
In September 2009, a film centered around Lobo was in development. Guy Ritchie and Brad Peyton were attached to direct at different times, while Dwayne Johnson was originally intended to star. After various iterations, in 2016, Jason Fuchs was hired as screenwriter. By February 2018, Michael Bay was attached to direct. Fuchs rewrote the script at Bay's request so the budget could be considerably lowered. In the autumn of 2022, Jason Momoa revealed that under the direction of James Gunn and Peter Safran, a project that he categorized as a "dream come true" was in development, which included his favorite comic book character. The project was later reported to be Lobo. Gunn and Safran later addressed Momoa's involvement with future adaptations of the character, stating that the actor would not portray two characters in the franchise. Momoa was later confirmed to portray Lobo in the DC Universe (DCU) franchise, starting with the film Supergirl (2026).

== Hourman ==
=== Hourman TV series ===
In November 2013, a live-action Hourman series was in development at The CW. Michael Caleo was writing the script to executive-produce the series alongside Dan Lin and Jennifer Gwartz. The premise of the series "centers on a brilliant yet troubled pharmaceutical analyst who discovers that the visions that have plagued him since childhood are actually glimpses of tragic events occurring one hour in the future. Determined to win back his ex-wife and son, he heroically prevents these tragedies from unfolding, finding both purpose and redemption along the way". Since then, no progress on the series was made after its announcement.

=== DCEU Hourman film ===
In March 2021, a film focused on the character of Hourman, written by Gavin James and Neil Widener, was in development.

== New Gods ==
=== New Gods animated film ===
Writer J. M. DeMatteis was interested in scripting a New Gods film set in the DC Animated Movie Universe.

=== DCEU New Gods film ===
In March 2018, Ava DuVernay signed on to direct a film centered around the New Gods. Initially, with a script written by Kario Salem, Tom King was later brought to co-write the film with DuVernay. Darkseid was planned to be the main antagonist of the film, and the Female Furies were set to appear. New Gods was canceled in April 2021, despite Warner Bros. stating that it could be revived in the future. The project faced difficulties due to Darkseid's role in Zack Snyder's Justice League, and Warner Bros. wanted time to pass before the character appeared again. DuVernay later revealed that Mister Miracle, Big Barda, Granny Goodness, and Highfather would have appeared in the film.

== Suicide Squad ==
=== Arrowverse Suicide Squad spin-off ===
In 2014, following the squad's debut episode in the second season of Arrow, Diggle's actor David Ramsey revealed that there was a talk of a spin-off focusing on Arrow's version of the Suicide Squad. Arrow co-producer and comic book writer Keto Shimizu later commented that it did not seem as a possibility due to David Ayer's Suicide Squad film in development at the time. Series producer Greg Berlanti later confirmed that the team's inclusion within Arrow was used to test the audience's reception and interest prior to Ayer's film being put into production.

=== DCEU Suicide Squad spin-offs ===
Several Suicide Squad spin-offs set in the DC Extended Universe were in various stages of development before they were canceled or delayed:

- Deadshot, a spin-off film centered around Floyd Lawton / Deadshot was in development by 2016, with Will Smith reprising his role from Suicide Squad. Smith later left due to scheduling conflicts, and the character was written out of The Suicide Squad to allow Smith an opportunity to return in a future film. By 2022, the production of the film was delayed in favor of other projects due to the production payroll that Smith had requested.
- Gotham City Sirens, a spin-off film based on the Gotham City Sirens (a team consisting of Harley Quinn, Catwoman, and Poison Ivy) was in development by 2016, with David Ayer signed on as director and co-producer from a script by Geneva Robertson-Dworet. Margot Robbie and Jared Leto were set to reprise their roles of Quinn and the Joker from Suicide Squad, with Robbie also taking the role of an executive producer. The film's development was later postponed in favor of Birds of Prey. The project was still on hold, and Robbie said that she chose to film Birds of Prey first to introduce audiences to lesser-known characters. She was still "pushing" forward with Gotham City Sirens, and also wanted to explore the relationship of Quinn with Ivy and Catwoman, including a romantic relationship portrayed between Quinn and Ivy as in the comics.
- By July 2017, a spin-off film featuring Harley Quinn and the Joker was in development with the working title of Harley Quinn vs. the Joker. Glenn Ficarra and John Requa were hired as co-writers, co-directors, and co-producers. By 2018, the script was completed and submitted to Warner Bros., and the production was scheduled to commence after Birds of Prey. The film was canceled in February 2019.
- By May 2020, Warner Bros. was in talks to make another Harley Quinn spin-off film set after The Suicide Squad.

=== Untitled The Suicide Squad sequel and spin-offs ===
In 2021, James Gunn said he had ideas for a sequel to The Suicide Squad and would have gone in a different direction by featuring a new Suicide Squad team. He considered to make this feature film after finishing on the first season of television series Peacemaker, but later canned the project following the new plans for DC Universe (DCU) franchise by him and Peter Safran. Additionally, Gunn planned several television spin-offs following the release of the film and Peacemaker, with Safran commenting that some members of the Squad could appear in own spin-offs like Bloodsport or Ratcatcher. One of the projects that Gunn worked on was separate from Amanda Waller series, featuring some characters from Peacemaker. The project was later revealed to be Creature Commandos, an animated show which was repurposed as the first entry of DC Universe franchise and was released in December 2024.

== Starman ==
=== Starman television series ===
A television series based on Jack Knight's adventures was planned by the creators of Smallville and Birds of Prey. It would have featured both Jack and his father, been set in Opal City, and attempted to follow the comics as closely as possible. In 2003, after the failure of Birds of Prey, it was last referred to as being "indefinitely on hold". There has since been no sign that it will ever be produced.

=== Starman live-action web series ===
Machinima Inc. and DC Entertainment were producing a live-action web series based on an updated version of the original concept of Starman titled DC's Hero Project. No production updates were provided after its initial announcement.

== Doom Patrol ==
=== Filmation's Doom Patrol animated series ===
During the 1960s, due to the success of the show The Superman/Aquaman Hour of Adventure, studio Filmation planned to make Doom Patrol animated series, but the plans were canceled due to CBS having animation rights to Batman and other DC characters.

=== Doom Patrol film ===
In 2006, Warner Bros. hired Adam Turner to pen a Doom Patrol screenplay. No director, cast, or release date were announced, and the project was later canceled.

== Metal Men ==
=== Filmation's Metal Men animated series ===
Due to the success of The Superman/Aquaman Hour of Adventure from the 1960s, Filmation planned to produce pilots for multiple DC heroes, with one of the concept drawings featuring the Metal Men. Those plans were canceled when CBS secured the animation rights to Batman in the wake of ABC's recent success with the Batman live-action television series at the time.

=== Metal Men film ===
A film adaptation of Metal Men entered development in 2007. Later in June 2012, Barry Sonnenfeld was in talks to direct the film. The project was in limbo until October 2021, when it was initially positioned as part of the DC Extended Universe.

=== Metal Men animated film ===
In December 2021, John Musker and Ron Clements were set to produce & direct an animated Metal Men film with Celeste Ballard writing the screenplay based on Musker & Clements' treatment.

== Blackhawks ==
=== Filmation's The Blackhawks animated series ===
A 1968 "presentation drawing" from Filmation depicts a red-shirted interpretation of Blackhawk and a member of the squadron fighting a group of aliens. Created during the height of The Superman/Aquaman Hour of Adventure's popularity, the artwork is believed to have been part of an attempt to convince CBS of the animation viability of other DC Comics properties.

=== The Blackhawks film ===
In the early 1980s, Steven Spielberg planned to direct a film adaptation of the Blackhawk comic book series, with Dan Aykroyd attached to play the title character, but the project was canceled and Spielberg chose to direct Raiders of the Lost Ark instead. In April 2018, Warner Bros. revived the Blackhawk project, with Spielberg returning to direct and produce and David Koepp writing the screenplay. Additionally, Spielberg was to co-produce the film with Kristie Macosko Krieger and Sue Kroll and was initially expected to begin after the completion of West Side Story.

== Swamp Thing ==
=== Swamp Thing reboot ===
Since 2009, Joel Silver planned to produce a reboot of Wes Craven's Swamp Thing film from a story written by Akiva Goldsman. In April 2010, Vincenzo Natali was confirmed to direct, but in May, he decided to delay the Swamp Thing reboot to pursue other projects. Since then, nothing has been said about the project. Another reboot of Swamp Thing is currently in development as part of the DC Universe (DCU) franchise.

=== Canceled Swamp Thing spin-off ===
Before the cancellation of the 2019 Swamp Thing series, there were plans to introduce Justice League Dark and create a spin-off series based on the team.

== Shazam ==
=== Captain Marvel/Shazam animated series proposals ===
Artist and writer Alex Ross pitched a Captain Marvel/Shazam animated series circa 1999 with Paul Dini. The proposal was brought to Cartoon Network, but was shelved for unknown reasons. The designs for the show would have been a mixture of the Bruce Timm style and the aesthetic of The Powerpuff Girls. Another proposal was a design work for an untitled Shazam project by Jake Castorena.

=== Untitled Black Adam sequel ===
After the release of Shazam! spin-off Black Adam in October 2022, Dwayne Johnson confirmed plans for Black Adam to fight Superman in the DC Extended Universe, and reaffirmed plans for the character to crossover with Shazam. Producers Hiram Garcia and Beau Flynn planned a fast-track production on the project. Due to the critical and commercial failure of the film, the plans for the sequel were cancelled due to the plans for the new DC film universe under James Gunn and Peter Safran. Johnson said that both DC Studios and his production company Seven Bucks Productions will continue to collaborate on plans for Black Adam.

== Wonder Twins ==
=== Wonder Twins: Powers Activate animated series ===
Kat Hudson, lead designer on DC Super Hero Girls and other projects, developed a pitch for an animated series based on the Wonder Twins. Despite the full pitch, the project ultimately did not come to fruition.

=== DCEU Wonder Twins film ===
In February 2022, a film centered around Zan and Jayna / the Wonder Twins entered development for HBO Max. Adam Sztykiel was slated to make his directorial debut and write the screenplay, with Marty Bowen and Wyck Godfrey serving as producers. By April, KJ Apa and Isabel May were cast in the lead roles of Zan and Jayna, respectively. Principal photography was scheduled to commence in Atlanta, Georgia in July, but the project was canceled in May following WarnerMedia's merger with Discovery Inc. and the creation of Warner Bros. Discovery. The CEO of the newly formed conglomerate, David Zaslav, felt that the film's estimated $75 million-plus budget would not bolster enough of a return as a straight-to-streaming release. Additionally, his directive mandate is that DC Films will first focus on theatrical releases, with internal criticism being that the project was conceived in a style deemed "too niche".

== Dial H for Hero ==
=== Dial "H" for Hero animated series ===
Marv Wolfman had pitched a Dial "H" for Hero TV show to Hanna-Barbera alongside the Teen Titans back in the 1980s.

=== #4Hero live-action series ===
Machinima Inc. and DC Entertainment were producing a live-action web series based on an updated version of Dial H for Hero. Titled #4Hero, the VFX-heavy comedy would have been about a young woman named Nellie Tribble who discovers a smartphone app that allows her to temporarily gain semi-useful superpowers dictated by whatever is trending at the moment. Since then, no production updates have been announced.

== Booster Gold ==
=== Booster Gold series by Greg Berlanti and Andrew Kreisberg ===
In 2011, Syfy ordered a live-action Booster Gold series, developed by Greg Berlanti and Andrew Kreisberg. Two years later, a pilot script was turned in, but nothing came of it.

=== DCEU Booster Gold film ===
In 2015, a buddy cop film centered around Booster Gold and Blue Beetle was in development with Greg Berlanti attached as producer, with interest in directing it. Zack Stentz was hired to write the script, which was completed in March 2018. The project was later repurposed for the DC Universe franchise, in the form of a titular television series.

== Others ==
=== Unlimited Powers ===
In 1989, Danny Bilson and Paul De Meo worked on a live-action series Unlimited Powers, starring Flash, Doctor Occult, Blok, and the daughter of Green Arrow. The premise was set in a dystopian future where superheroes had been outlawed, taking cues from comics such as Watchmen and The Dark Knight Returns. It did not make it past the script phase.

=== Zatanna film ===
In 2005, Ice Princess screenwriter Hadley Davis was hired to write an action-comedy film about a teenage version of Zatanna. Warner Bros. later put Zatanna solo film as part of the DC Extended Universe in 2018. Zatanna was initially in development as an HBO Max-exclusive film, and Emerald Fennell was hired as screenwriter. The film was to be produced by J. J. Abrams. By 2022, the film was initially scrapped at HBO Max, but later began being shopped around to other streaming services.

=== Blue Beetle TV series ===
Geoff Johns announced a live action TV series featuring the Jamie Reyes incarnation of Blue Beetle. A test trailer was released with stuntman and actor Garrett Plotkin as Jaime Reyes. Scenes of this trailer were shown as part of the DC Nation block of programming in 2012 on Cartoon Network during the premiere of Green Lantern: The Animated Series. Since then, nothing has been announced about the project.

=== Spectre TV series ===
Fox announced in 2011 plans to develop a television series featuring the Spectre. There have been no further developments since.

=== The original Human Target TV series ===
The original version of Human Target was created by Warner Bros. Television and Pet Fly Productions, producers of The Flash and later The Sentinel for Paramount Pictures. The original pilot for the series was filmed in 1990 but ABC declined to pick up the series for the 1990-91 television season and this pilot never aired. In the original unaired pilot, musician Clarence Clemons, who was trying to establish himself as an actor, played Chance's pilot.

Harvey Shephard, then the president of Warner Bros. Television, told The New York Times in December 1991 that Human Target was intended for both American audiences and the international television market. A different pilot was filmed, resulting in the 1992 short-lived TV series Human Target.

=== Jonah Hex TV special ===
In 2000, 20th Century Fox developed a one-hour adaptation based on the character Jonah Hex to television with producers Akiva Goldsman and Robert Zappia involved, but the project never made it into production.

=== Early attempts at a Mad TV series ===
A 1974 animated television pilot based on the Mad magazine that used selected material from the magazine was commissioned by ABC, but the network decided not broadcast it. Dick DeBartolo noted that "nobody wanted to sponsor a show that made fun of products that were advertised on TV, like car manufacturers". The program was instead created into a TV special and is available for online viewing.

In the mid-1980s, Hanna-Barbera developed another potential Mad animated television series which was never broadcast.

=== Sgt. Rock film ===
In the late 1980s and early 1990s, Arnold Schwarzenegger was attached to the title role of a Sgt. Rock film, despite the seeming incongruity of an Austrian actor playing an American G.I. in World War II. Screenplays were written by David Webb Peoples in 1987, Steven E. de Souza in 1988, John Milius in 1993, and Brian Helgeland in 1996, depicting Rock as having a German-American father and being able to speak German (a skill he uses to ambush the enemy). Producer Joel Silver still attempted to make a Sgt. Rock film. John Cox has written the latest screenplay, which is not based on any of the previous screenplay drafts. Cox said that Schwarzenegger was no longer attached to star in the project. In April 2007, David Gambino, VP at Silver Pictures said: "The good news is we have a fantastic screenplay, and everybody's really happy with it. It's really just about trying to attach the cast right now and really decide what the movie is going to be, how we're going to make it". Bruce Willis was reportedly under consideration for the role. In December 2008, Guy Ritchie revealed that the film was shelved due to his work on Sherlock Holmes but confirmed that the Sgt. Rock film will be set during World War II and include the members of Easy Company. The setting was later changed from World War II to another battle in the near future. Since then, there have been no further announcements.

=== Project 13 TV series ===
In October 2017, The CW was developing a one-hour drama series based on Traci Thirteen and her father, Dr. Terrance Thirteen, titled Project 13, with Elizabeth Banks attached as an executive producer. The project never came to fruition.

=== Secret Six TV series ===
In October 2018, Suits's Rick Muirragui was hired to write and produce a Secret Six TV series with Bill Lawrence's Doozer Productions for CBS. No production updates were provided and the project was later canceled.

=== Monolith film ===
An adaptation of Monolith by Lionsgate was in development since August 2016, with visual effects director Dave Wilson attached as director.

=== The Mighty film ===
In June 2011, Paramount Pictures acquired the rights to The Mighty. There have been no further developments since.

=== Kamandi TV series ===
In the late 1970s, an animated Kamandi television series was optioned, but was canceled before entering the production phase.

=== Justice League Dark, Constantine and Madame X DCEU projects ===
By November 2012, Guillermo del Toro signed a deal to write and direct a Justice League Dark film centered around DC Comics' supernatural characters, including John Constantine and Madame Xanadu. He was attached to the project until his exit in June 2015. Doug Liman was later attached to the project, but also later left due to scheduling conflicts. By 2020, the project was redeveloped as a series for HBO Max, with J. J. Abrams attached as an executive producer. Justice League Dark was intended to premiere after the individual team members were introduced in their own series, with the studios involved inspired to a similar approach as Marvel Television's Netflix series individually premiering before crossing over in The Defenders (2017). By 2023, the series was no longer moving forward.

In 2021, two series focusing on John Constantine and Madame Xanadu entered development at HBO Max. For Constantine, the series was to feature a younger version of the character in contemporary London and was planned to be horror-oriented. Guy Bolton was hired to write the pilot, while J. J. Abrams was attached as an executive producer. They were looking to the non-white actors for the lead role. For Madame X, Angela Robinson was attached to write and executive produce the series along with J. J. Abrams. Both shows were planned to tie in with Justice League Dark. The following year, both shows were no longer moving forward at HBO Max in favor of developing a sequel to the film Constantine (2005), while the shows were shopped around to other streaming services.

=== DCEU Deathstroke film ===
In 2017, a film centered around Slade Wilson / Deathstroke was in development with Gareth Evans attached as screenwriter and director from a story by Joe Manganiello, who was also set to reprise his role from Justice League. The project was greenlit after Evans impressed executives with his pitch. By April 2020, Evans was no longer in negotiations to work on the project, stating that he had never been contractually involved with its development. He described the story as a "dark" and "unforgiving" origin story, similar to Korean noir films. In March 2021, after numerous delays, Deathstroke was canceled because Warner Bros. did not consider it a priority. The project was brought back in discussions to revive it as part of Gunn and Safran's plans for DC Universe franchise. The project was canceled in February 2024, when Manganiello revealed that Gunn convinced him to let the project and role go, but the comic book artist Jim Lee approached Manganiello to create a graphic novel series based on his unproduced screenplay once it was decided to "dismantle" the DCEU.

=== DCEU Black Canary film ===
By August 2021, an HBO Max-exclusive film centered around Dinah Lance / Black Canary entered development with Jurnee Smollett reprising her role from Birds of Prey, Misha Green writing the script, and Sue Kroll producing. Although it continued to be developed, the fate of the project is uncertain due to the plans for the new DCU franchise by Gunn and Safran.

=== Black Lightning spin-off Painkiller ===
In November 2020, The CW reportedly began to develop a backdoor pilot for a spin-off of Painkiller with Jordan Calloway reprising his role from Black Lightning. Three months later, Sibongile Mlambo, Alexander Hodge, and James Roch joined the cast. Later in May, The CW passed on the project.

=== Strange Adventures series ===
In 2019, WarnerMedia and Greg Berlanti, the producer of The CW's Arrowverse, wanted to produce a "superhero anthology" series under the title Strange Adventures for HBO Max. The series had reportedly been in development previously for the DC Universe streaming service. In August 2022, Kevin Smith, who was writing the script with Eric Carrasco, said that the series was canceled.

=== Stargirl spin-off Infinity Inc. ===
After the series Stargirl was canceled in 2022, it was revealed that a spin-off revolving around Infinity Inc. was planned and that it would have followed the Shade, Jennie, and Todd searching for the other offspring of the original Justice Society of America (JSA) members and help them with their potential abilities.

=== Justice U spin-off ===
An Arrowverse series titled Justice U that would have starred David Ramsey was in development by January 2022, developed by Michael Narducci and Zoanne Clack. The premise of the proposed show would have shown John Diggle recruiting five young meta-humans to live undercover as freshmen at a prestigious university, with Diggle overseeing their education and training. Ramsey was attached to direct the pilot if ordered, with Greg Berlanti, Sarah Schechter, David Madden, and Geoff Johns executive producing alongside Narducci and Clack. The CW passed on the proposal one year later in May.

=== Filmation's Metamorpho and B'wana Beast animated series ===
In the 1960s, due to the success of the show The Superman/Aquaman Hour of Adventure, Filmation considered to make a Metamorpho and B'wana Beast animated shows, which also included a concept drawings, but the plans were canceled when CBS secured the animation rights to Batman in the wake of ABC's recent success with the Batman live action television series.

=== Hawkman film ===
A Hawkman film was in development by Warner Bros. in the early 2010s, but nothing came of it.

=== Harley Quinn & Poison Ivy animated series ===
An animated series starring Harley Quinn and Poison Ivy was in development in 2001, but never made it past early pre-production. Character designs for the series were done by Shane Glines.

=== Mortal Kombat vs. DC Universe ===
Jeremy Adams, who worked on the Mortal Kombat Legends animated films, pitched a Mortal Kombat vs. DC Universe animated film based on the videogame of the same name to Warner, but it was rejected.

=== Hitman Animated TV Show ===
While developing the Kite Man: Hell Yeah! series, Dean Lorey (who was a big fan of Garth Ennis's Hitman comics) pitched an animated series of the character to the Syfy network, but was turned down. Because of this, many Hitman characters appeared in Kite Man, such as Moe e Joe Double, for example.

== See also ==
- List of unproduced Marvel Comics projects
- List of unproduced Dark Horse Comics projects
- List of unproduced Image Comics projects
- List of unproduced films based on DC Comics imprints
