= Boettcher Scholarship =

Undergraduate scholarship

The Boettcher Scholarship is a four-year, full-tuition, and partial living expenses merit-based academic scholarship awarded to graduating Colorado high school students. On average, award recipients, rank in the top 2% of their graduating classes and have an average SAT score of 1400 (roughly the 97th percentile).

The award is considered a "full-ride" and allows Boettcher Scholars to attend any accredited Colorado university for 4 years without significant expenses by the student. Since 2022, Boettcher Scholarships has always been awarded to 50 students each year, representing about 3% of applicants. Recipients are selected from 100 finalists who are interviewed by the Foundation board. 300 semi-finalists are required to add a teacher recommendation to their application with the hopes of advancing to be a finalist. In the 2021–2022 season, over 1,600 students applied. If a student declines the scholarship, alternates are promoted from the pool of finalists so that all scholarship slots are used.

The program was started in 1952 with the intention of keeping high-performing students in Colorado. The most popular destination for recipients of the award has been the University of Colorado at Boulder, although significant numbers of Scholars have attended the University of Denver, Colorado State University, Colorado College and the Colorado School of Mines. The associated Teacher Recognition Awards Program was started in 1992.

Boettcher Scholars have subsequently been awarded well-known graduate scholarships, including Marshall Scholarships, Rhodes Scholarships, and National Science Foundation Graduate Research Fellowships (NSF-GRFP) to continue their studies. Currently, there are roughly 2,000 Boettcher Scholar alumni, more than half of whom reside in Colorado.

== Notable recipients ==
- Dee Bradley Baker
- Nick Counter
- Donna Haraway
- James Heckman
