= DC Studios =

American entertainment company

- Type: Subsidiary
- Industry: Film; TV; animation; video games
- Genre: Superhero fiction
- Predecessor: DC Films (2016–2022)
- Founded: May 17, 2016; 10 years ago (as DC Films); November 1, 2022; 4 years ago (as DC Studios)
- Founder: Geoff Johns; Jon Berg (as DC Films); James Gunn; Peter Safran (as DC Studios)
- Headquarters: 4000 Warner Boulevard, Burbank, California, U.S.
- Area served: Worldwide
- Key people: James Gunn (co-chairman and co-CEO); Peter Safran (co-chairman and co-CEO); Jeremy Latcham (president and chief creative officer; effective December 1, 2026)
- Products: Motion pictures; Television shows
- Brands: DC Extended Universe (2016–2023); DC Universe (2024–present); DC Elseworlds
- Parent: Skydance Motion Picture Group
- Website: Official website

DC Studios is an American film and television production company that is a subsidiary of the Skydance Motion Picture Group. It is responsible for the production of live-action and animated films and television series, as well as video games, based on characters from the American comic book publisher DC Comics, primarily as part of its flagship media franchise and shared universe, the DC Universe (DCU). Writer and director James Gunn and producer Peter Safran served as its co-chairmen and co-CEOs from its November 2022 formation until December 2026.

The studio's predecessor, DC Films, was formed in May 2016 as a division of Warner Bros. Pictures to oversee DC Comics–based film productions, primarily those from its shared universe franchise, the DC Extended Universe (DCEU). DC comic book and television writer Geoff Johns and Warner Bros. producer Jon Berg served as co-chairmen. After several DCEU films received poor reception and underperformed financially, the duo stepped down by the end of 2017, and the division was reorganized, with Walter Hamada hired as the studio's president. After DC and Warner Bros. owner WarnerMedia merged with Discovery, Inc. in April 2022 to form Warner Bros. Discovery (WBD), the company overhauled its operations, leading Hamada to step down in October 2022. DC Films was then dissolved in favor of DC Studios, a new division with greater oversight of DC media. Gunn and Safran, who had worked on some DCEU projects, were hired to lead the studio, and the duo began work on the DCU as a new franchise to serve as a soft reboot of the DCEU. After Skydance inherited DC Studios and the DCU by acquiring WBD in October 2026, Gunn and Safran announced in November that they would step down the next month, with former Marvel Studios executive Jeremy Latcham succeeding them as president and chief creative officer.

DC Films produced 13 films within the DCEU, from Suicide Squad (2016) to Aquaman and the Lost Kingdom (2023), as well as two standalone films, Joker (2019) and The Batman (2022). The studio's DCEU film Aquaman (2018) and Joker each grossed over $1 billion and are thus among the highest-grossing films of all time; Aquaman is the highest-grossing film based on a DC Comics character, while Joker was the highest-grossing R-rated film upon its release and the first to earn over a billion dollars at the worldwide box office. The first DC Studios production is the television series The Penguin (2024), a spin-off from The Batman. DC Studios releases films and television series within the DCU, starting with the animated series Creature Commandos in 2024, and the film Superman in 2025. Productions that are not part of the DCU are set to be part of the "DC Elseworlds" label. The studio's first animated feature film is set to be Dynamic Duo (2028).

== History ==
=== Formation of DC Films and initial developments (2016–2022) ===
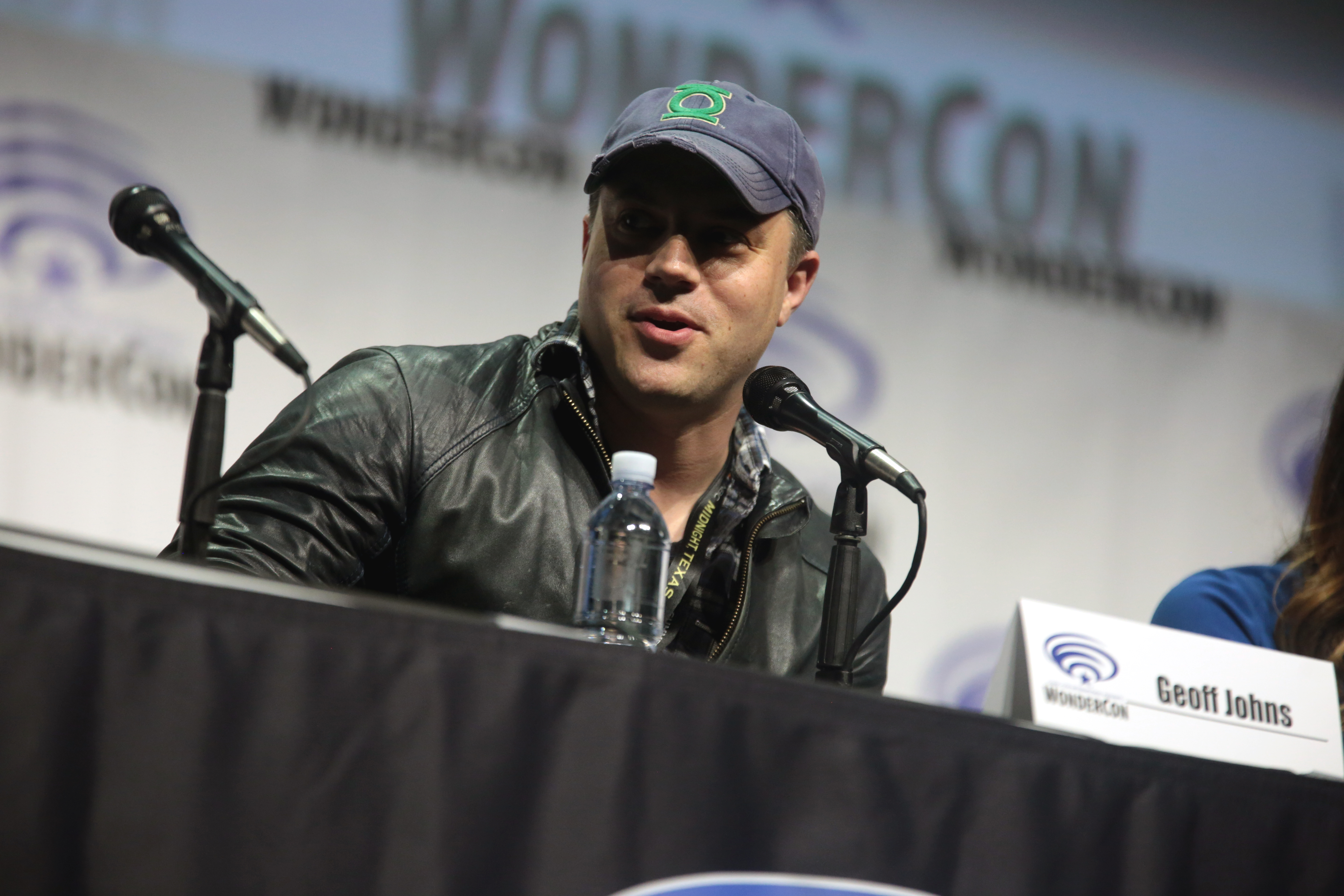
Writer and producer Geoff Johns was the co-founder and co-chairman of DC Films who oversaw the DC Extended Universe from 2015 until 2018

After the divisive reception to Batman v Superman: Dawn of Justice (2016), Warner Bros. Pictures sought to stabilize the direction of its media franchise and shared universe, the DC Extended Universe (DCEU). In May 2016, the studio reorganized to have genre-responsible film executives; thus, DC Entertainment films under Warner Bros. Pictures were placed under a new division, DC Films, to be led by Warner Bros. executive vice president, Jon Berg, and the chief creative officer of DC Comics, Geoff Johns. This was done in hopes of competing more directly with Marvel Studios' franchise, the Marvel Cinematic Universe. Johns kept his role at DC Comics and reported to DC Entertainment's president, Diane Nelson, while Berg reported to Warner Bros. Pictures' president, Greg Silverman. The division's formation was not designed to override the "director-driven" mandate.

Justice League (2017) had one of the largest film budgets–nearly $300 million–but grossed approximately $96 million in its opening weekend. Steven Zeitchik, in an analysis for The Washington Post, expected another course correction, with a possible change in leadership. Scott Mendelson of Forbes felt that the course correction would be for DC Films to give up on the shared universe, while continuing with the Wonder Woman films and occasionally other films, as Warner Bros. had other franchises they could work with. Despite this, in December, the studio reiterated their planned film slate for the DCEU. That same month, Warner Bros. announced that a new strategy and organization of DC Films would occur, with Berg leaving his position as the studio's co-president of production to form a Warner Bros.–based production company with Roy Lee. Johns was expected to remain involved in future DC films moving forward in an advisory role while continuing as the president and chief creative officer of DC Entertainment, with Warner Bros. expected to hire a new studio head.

In January 2018, Warner Bros. executive Walter Hamada was appointed as the new president of DC Films to oversee its DCEU films. Hamada was closely associated with New Line Cinema, and helped develop horror films, such as It (2017) and The Conjuring film franchise. Johns subsequently left his role at DC Entertainment that June, and he was no longer involved with the DCEU. The studio's DCEU film Aquaman (2018) grossed over $1.1 billion at the worldwide box office, became the highest-grossing film based on a DC Comics character and the highest-grossing DCEU entry. The studio's subsequent standalone film Joker (2019) grossed $1.07 billion, making it the highest-grossing R-rated film upon its release and the first to earn over a billion dollars at the worldwide box office.

=== Restructuring and immediate changes (2022) ===
In April 2022, after the merger between Warner Bros. owner WarnerMedia and Discovery, Inc. to form Warner Bros. Discovery (WBD), the new CEO David Zaslav was exploring a restructuring of DC Entertainment, including having a creative leader akin to Marvel Studios president Kevin Feige to lead its film and television projects. Later in July, Toby Emmerich stepped down as the head of the Warner Bros. Motion Picture Group. The group was restructured to give DC Films, Warner Bros. Pictures, New Line Cinema, and Warner Animation Group respective leadership. Former MGM executives Michael De Luca and Pamela Abdy became the co-executives of Warner Bros. Pictures and New Line Cinema. They were also temporarily assigned to oversee the remaining units of the group until the new positions were filled.

When the release of the film Batgirl was canceled by WBD in August, Hamada was not consulted regarding the decision and only learned about it when De Luca and Abdy informed him at a test screening for Black Adam (2022). Hamada was upset and considered resigning, but agreed to stay until Black Adam's release. Later that month, Dan Lin entered talks to oversee DC's film and television divisions. From this position, Lin was expected to report directly to Zaslav, while Hamada would depart the studio. In September, Lin and WBD ended negotiations and agreed to part ways, in part due to Lin's concerns with the Batgirl cancellation. During Black Adam's Times Square premiere in October, star and producer Dwayne Johnson said he could be a consultant at DC Films, helping the studio find its next creative leader. Later that month, it was reported that De Luca had been effectively running DC Films in place of Hamada. On October 19, Hamada departed the company, two days before the release of Black Adam.

=== Formation of DC Studios and James Gunn and Peter Safran's leadership (2022–2026) ===
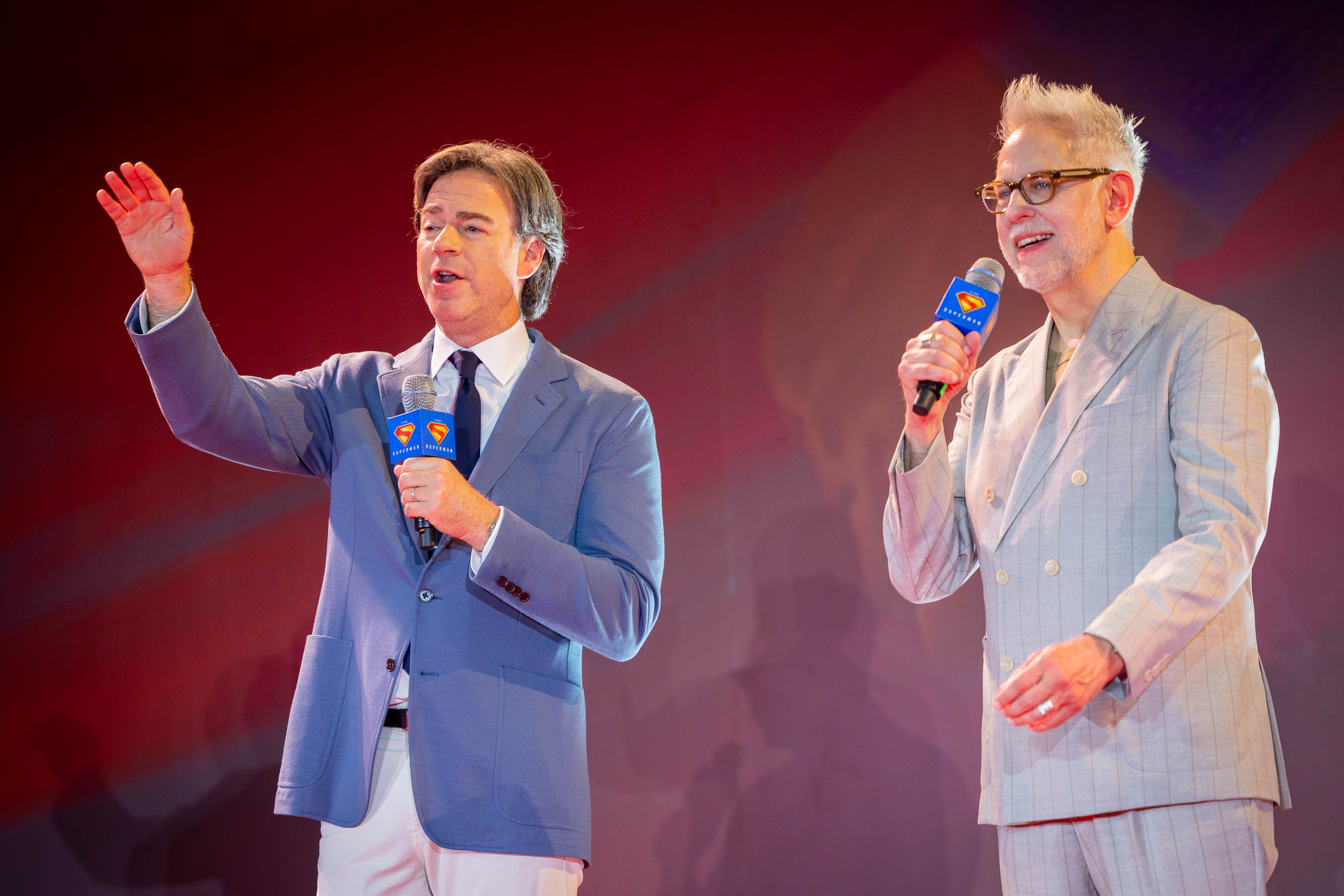
Writer/director James Gunn (right) and producer Peter Safran were appointed as the co-chairmen and co-CEOs of DC Studios in October 2022 and began planning the new DC Universe.

Less than a week after Hamada's departure, writer/director James Gunn and producer Peter Safran, who had previously worked together on the DCEU film The Suicide Squad (2021) and its spin-off series Peacemaker (2022), were announced as the co-CEOs and co-chairmen of DC Studios, a newly created production entity under WBD. DC Films was dissolved, and DC Studios oversaw the remaining films from the studio pending release in 2023. The duo was tasked with leading the production of films, television, animation, and video games under the DC label, reporting directly to Zaslav while also working alongside, but independently of, the heads of WBD's other divisions. Gunn oversees the creative development of DC projects, while Safran supervises the production side. Their roles officially began on November 1, 2022, and reportedly lasted for four years.

In November, Gunn said that the studio would focus on multiple DCU live-action and animated projects, but also stated that they would acknowledge fan responses and complaints, and confirmed all subsequent DC projects would be released under the DC Studios banner, including those that were filmed before the formation of the studio. In December, Gunn announced that he was writing a new Superman film that would feature a younger actor in the role. Henry Cavill was not set to return as Superman, while Ben Affleck, who portrayed Bruce Wayne / Batman in the DCEU, was reported to be in talks to direct a new DC Studios project, before Affleck stated that he was not interested in directing a DC film. Gunn later revealed that new DC films would have an equal focus on popular and obscure characters, drawing inspiration from the DC animated series Justice League Unlimited (2004–2006) and Young Justice (2010–2022).

On January 31, 2023, Gunn and Safran announced the first slate of DCU content, titled "Chapter One: Gods and Monsters". They also assembled a writers' room that included Drew Goddard, Jeremy Slater, Christina Hodson, Christal Henry, and Tom King. Projects that are not a part of the shared universe are branded as "DC Elseworlds". The following month, Gunn confirmed development for animated films within both the DCU and DC Elseworlds. Gunn said in March that they were working on potentially incorporating characters from DC's Vertigo Comics imprint beyond the Swamp Thing film, and said the following month that there were plans to incorporate characters from Milestone Media publications by DC, such as Static. In September, WBD announced that it would expand its production facility at Warner Bros. Studios Leavesden, England, which would serve as the primary production hub for DC Studios. Gunn and Safran were consulting on the expansion, with work scheduled to start in the second quarter of 2024 and expected to be completed by 2027. DC Studios's television series were initially all intended for the streaming service HBO Max (briefly renamed to simply "Max"), but in June 2024, WBD shifted many of its planned big-budget Max series to be HBO originals beginning in 2025, including upcoming series from DC Studios.

The main DC Studios logo animation

External videos
- James Gunn on Instagram: Here's the video that played at #SDCC before the logo reveal. 🧜‍♂️ presents James Gunn explaining why he and Peter Safran chose the studio's logo, Instagram video from Gunn's account (archive)

In February 2024, Gunn and Safran worked with WBD corporate siblings to acquire Super/Man: The Christopher Reeve Story (2024), a documentary film about Superman actor Christopher Reeve. This is the first film to be released under the DC Studios banner, while The Penguin (2024) is the first DC Studios production and the first series to be released under that banner. In June 2024, DC Studios and Warner Bros. Animation were revealed to be developing an animated television series focused on the character Jaime Reyes / Blue Beetle for the DCU that would follow after the events of the DCEU film Blue Beetle (2023). At San Diego Comic-Con in July, Gunn unveiled the official logo for DC Studios as an updated version of the 1977 "DC Bullet" logo designed by Milton Glaser, alongside an animated introduction sequence featuring Superman, in a recreation of the back cover of Superman #1 (1939) designed by Warner Bros. Animation. The updated logo was also being used for DC Comics and its affiliated units, but was not used for some earlier projects that DC Studios had inherited, namely The Penguin and the animated series Harley Quinn (2019–2025), because they were not as involved in those. A slightly different DC Studios logo animation is used for the end credits on The Penguin, while a separate logo and opening animation are set to be used for future projects released under the "DC Elseworlds" banner.

In October 2024, DC Studios and Warner Bros. Pictures Animation greenlit the theatrical animated film Dynamic Duo (2028), which was the first new project to move forward at DC Studios following its DCU announcements and was intended to be the studio's first animated feature film. The film Joker: Folie à Deux (2024) is part of the "DC Elseworlds" label and was overseen by Warner Bros. Pictures co-chiefs De Luca and Abdy, without the involvement of Gunn, Safran, or DC Studios, although the DC logo used before that studio's formation is included in the credits. At the time of the film's release later that month, Gunn said that "[a]ll future films with DC characters [would] be DC Studios" productions moving forward, and he later clarified that the studio would release every subsequent film and television adaptation from DC. Ahead of the premiere of the DCU series Creature Commandos in December 2024, DC Studios announced the unscripted biweekly video podcast series DC Studios Showcase: The Official Podcast, produced by OBB Sound for the streaming service Max. Later that month, they also announced the launch of its DC Studios Fan First newsletter via DC's website, to provide updates on the company's projects, with an introduction message written by Gunn.

DC Studios announced in February 2025 that it had greenlit three "younger-skewed" animated series—Starfire!, the My Adventures with Superman (2023–present) spin-off My Adventures with Green Lantern, and DC Super Powers—which were being co-produced with Warner Bros. Animation. The adult animation series Mister Miracle, also co-produced with that studio, was announced in June. In November, DC Studios was revealed to be developing a new television series adaptation of the 1982–1989 Vertigo graphic novel V for Vendetta for HBO, alongside Warner Bros. Television Studios, Ben Stephenson of Poison Pen, and Leanne Klein of Wall to Wall Media. By December, Gunn and Safran's contracts were scheduled to last through early to mid-2027. In April 2026, DC Studios was revealed to have inherited My Adventures with Superman, beginning with its third season. Also that month, DC Studios and Warner Bros. Discovery Global Experiences announced Superman Experience: Defenders Unite, an interactive mixed reality walkthrough attraction inspired by Superman that opened as part of the Warner Bros. Studio Tour Hollywood on April 18, "Superman Day". In June 2026, DC Studios was revealed to have inherited Batman: Caped Crusader, beginning with its second season. Later that month, during the 2026 Annecy International Animation Film Festival, DC Studios announced three more animated series in development: an adaptation of the Absolute Batman (2024–present) comic developed by its creator, Scott Snyder; an animated Krypto series by C. H. Greenblatt; and its first anime series, Joker: Laugh Riot, co-produced with Sola Entertainment. In August, DC Studios and Warner Bros. Animation announced an adult animation series adaptation of the 2012 graphic novel Get Jiro! written by celebrity chef and television personality Anthony Bourdain and Joel Rose that was published by DC Vertigo.

=== Skydance ownership and departure of James Gunn and Peter Safran (since 2026) ===
After David Ellison's Skydance acquired Warner Bros. Discovery in October 2026, DC Studios was placed within the Skydance Motion Picture Group while Gunn and Safran were formally set to remain at DC Studios and report directly to Ellison and his Skydance co-CEO Ynon Kreiz. Despite this, Gunn and Safran announced in early November 2026 that they would step down from DC Studios by December 1, when former Marvel Studios executive Jeremy Latcham would succeed them as president and chief creative officer. He was set to report to Dana Goldberg and Josh Greenstein, co-chairs of the Skydance Motion Picture Group, instead of directly to Ellison. The Hollywood Reporter reported that Ellison had been unhappy with Gunn and Safran reporting directly to him as opposed to Goldberg and Greenstein, and believed Latcham, described as a "down-the-middle shooter", would deliver more content aimed at a general audience over the focus on lesser-known characters that Gunn had been prioritizing.

== Management ==
=== Current executives ===
- James Gunn – Co-chairman and co-chief executive officer (CEO), DC Studios; Gunn serves in leadership as creative head for the company (November 2022–present)
- Peter Safran – Co-chairman and co-chief executive officer (CEO), DC Studios; Safran serves in leadership over the business aspects of the company (November 2022–present)
- Jeremy Latcham – President and chief creative officer, DC Studios (effective December 2026)
- Chantal Nong – Executive Vice President (EVP), Production, DC Studios; Nong oversees the production and creative development of DC-based films, television, and animation (November 2022–present); formerly Senior Vice President, Feature Development and Production of DC Films, overseeing creative development and production management of DC-based films (February 2018 – November 2022)
- Candice McDonough – Executive Vice President (EVP), Publicity and Communications; McDonough oversees media relations, publicity, and external and employee communications (July 2023–present)
- Galen Vaisman – Vice President (VP), Creative Development; former assistant to Jon Berg
- Lars P. Winther – Executive Vice President (EVP), Physical Production

=== Former executives ===
- Jon Berg – Executive Vice President (EVP) and co-president of production, Warner Bros. Pictures; co-chairman of DC Films; and co-runner of the DCEU (May 2016 – December 2017)
- Geoff Johns – Co-chairman of DC Films (May 2016 – December 2017); president and chief creative officer, DC Entertainment (February 2010 – June 2018); and co-runner of the DCEU (2015 – June 2018)
- Walter Hamada – President, DC-Based Film Production, Warner Bros. Pictures (January 2018 – October 2022)

== Production library ==
=== Films ===
==== Live-action films ====
Each DC Films and DC Studios film is distributed by Warner Bros. Pictures.

===== Produced by DC Films =====
Title	Release date	Director(s)	Production partner(s)	Franchise
Suicide Squad	August 5, 2016	David Ayer	RatPac-Dune Entertainment; Atlas Entertainment	DC Extended Universe
Wonder Woman	June 2, 2017	Patty Jenkins	Atlas Entertainment; Cruel and Unusual Films	DC Extended Universe
Justice League	November 17, 2017	Zack Snyder Joss Whedon (Note: Zack Snyder left Justice League during post-production and was replaced by Joss Whedon, who rewrote and reshot the majority of the film. He is credited as co-screenwriter and an executive producer, while Snyder retains sole credit as the film's director.)	RatPac-Dune Entertainment; Atlas Entertainment; Cruel and Unusual Films	DC Extended Universe
Aquaman	December 21, 2018	James Wan	RatPac-Dune Entertainment; The Safran Company; Cruel and Unusual Films; Mad Ghost Productions	DC Extended Universe
Shazam!	April 5, 2019	David F. Sandberg	New Line Cinema; The Safran Company; Seven Bucks Productions	DC Extended Universe
Joker	October 4, 2019	Todd Phillips	Village Roadshow Pictures; Bron Creative; Joint Effort Productions	"DC Elseworlds"
Birds of Prey	February 7, 2020	Cathy Yan	LuckyChap Entertainment; Kroll & Co. Entertainment; Clubhouse Productions	DC Extended Universe
Wonder Woman 1984	December 25, 2020	Patty Jenkins	Atlas Entertainment; The Stone Quarry	DC Extended Universe
Zack Snyder's Justice League	March 18, 2021	Zack Snyder	Atlas Entertainment; Dune Entertainment; The Stone Quarry	DC Extended Universe
The Suicide Squad	August 5, 2021	James Gunn	Atlas Entertainment; The Safran Company	DC Extended Universe
The Batman	March 4, 2022	Matt Reeves	6th & Idaho; Dylan Clark Productions	"DC Elseworlds"
Black Adam	October 21, 2022	Jaume Collet-Serra	New Line Cinema; Seven Bucks Productions; FlynnPictureCo.	DC Extended Universe
Shazam! Fury of the Gods	March 17, 2023	David F. Sandberg	New Line Cinema; The Safran Company	DC Extended Universe
The Flash	June 16, 2023	Andy Muschietti	The Disco Factory; Double Dream	DC Extended Universe
Blue Beetle	August 18, 2023	Ángel Manuel Soto	The Safran Company	DC Extended Universe
Aquaman and the Lost Kingdom	December 22, 2023	James Wan	The Safran Company; Atomic Monster	DC Extended Universe
Batgirl	Unreleased	Adil El Arbi and Bilall Fallah	Burr! Productions	DC Extended Universe

===== Produced by DC Studios =====
Title	Release date	Director	Production partner(s)	Franchise	Status
Superman	July 11, 2025	James Gunn	Troll Court Entertainment; The Safran Company	DC Universe	Released
Supergirl	June 26, 2026	Craig Gillespie	Troll Court Entertainment; The Safran Company	DC Universe	Released
Clayface	October 23, 2026	James Watkins	6th & Idaho	DC Universe	Released
Man of Tomorrow	July 9, 2027	James Gunn	Troll Court Entertainment; The Safran Company	DC Universe	Post-production
The Batman: Part II	February 18, 2028	Matt Reeves	6th & Idaho; Dylan Clark Productions	"DC Elseworlds"	Filming

==== Animated film ====
Animated films produced by DC Studios
Title	Release date	Director	Production partner(s)	Animation provider	Distributed by	Status
Dynamic Duo	September 22, 2028	Arthur Mintz	Warner Bros. Pictures Animation; 6th & Idaho	Swaybox Studios	Warner Bros. Pictures	In production

==== Documentary film ====
Title	Release date	Directors	Production companies	Distribution partners
Super/Man: The Christopher Reeve Story	September 21, 2024	Ian Bonhôte and Peter Ettedgui	Words + Pictures; Passion Pictures; Misfits Entertainment; Jenco Films	Warner Bros. Pictures; HBO Documentary Films; CNN Films; Fathom Events

=== Television ===
==== Live-action series ====
DC Studios co-produces each live-action series in association with Warner Bros. Television.

Series	Released	Showrunner	Production partner(s)	Franchise	Original network	Notes
The Penguin	2024	Lauren LeFranc	Acid and Tender Productions; 6th & Idaho; Dylan Clark Productions; Chapel Place Productions; Zobot Projects	"DC Elseworlds"	HBO	Miniseries; spin-off from The Batman
Peacemaker	2025	James Gunn	The Safran Company; Troll Court Entertainment	DC Universe	HBO Max	Season 2
Lanterns	2026–present	Chris Mundy	Man, Woman & Child Productions	DC Universe	HBO	
The People v. Gorilla Grodd	2027	Tony Yacenda and Dan Perrault	TBA	DC Universe	HBO Max	Post-production

==== Animated series ====
DC Studios co-produces each animated series in association with Warner Bros. Animation.

Series	Released	Showrunner(s)	Production partner(s)	Franchise	Original network	Notes
Creature Commandos	2024–present	Dean Lorey	Troll Court Entertainment; The Safran Company; Lorey Stories	DC Universe	HBO Max	Renewed for season 2
Harley Quinn	2025	Dean Lorey	Yes, Norman Productions; Ehsugadee Productions; Delicious Non-Sequitur; Lorey Stories	"DC Elseworlds"	HBO Max	Season 5
Krypto Saves the Day!	2025–present	Ryan Kramer	Troll Court Entertainment; The Safran Company	"DC Elseworlds"	YouTube and HBO Max	Series of shorts
My Adventures with Superman	2026–present	Jake Wyatt and Brendan Clougher	—N/a	"DC Elseworlds"	Adult Swim	Season 3 onwards
Batman: Caped Crusader	2026–present	Bruce Timm and James Tucker	Bad Robot Productions; 6th & Idaho; Amazon MGM Studios	"DC Elseworlds"	Amazon Prime Video	Season 2 onwards
Get Jiro	2026–present	Alessandro Tanaka and Brian Gatewood	Multiverse Cowboy; G&T Productions	"DC Elseworlds"	Adult Swim	Based on a DC Vertigo graphic novel

=== Podcasts ===
DC Studios has partnered with OBB Sound, DC Comics, HBO Max, and YouTube on podcasts discussing its projects with various creatives and actors, including DC Studios Showcase: The Official Podcast (2024–present), Peacemaker: The Official Podcast with James Gunn (2025), Lanterns: The Official Podcast (2026–present), and The Suicide Squad: Is It Canon? The Official Podcast (2026).

== See also ==
- DC Entertainment
- List of films based on DC Comics publications
- List of television series based on DC Comics publications
- List of unproduced DC Comics projects
- Marvel Studios
