= Melissa Zukerman =

Communications executive

- Education: Northwestern University (BA)
- Employer: Skydance
- Title: Chief communications officer

Melissa Zukerman is an American communications executive who is the chief communications officer of Skydance. She previously served as an adviser to David Ellison and led Skydance's communications during the merger of Skydance Media and Paramount Global, and during Paramount Skydance's acquisition of Warner Bros. Discovery.

== Career ==
=== Early career ===
Zukerman graduated from Northwestern University with a bachelor's degree in communications. She held corporate communications positions at Universal, iFilm, E! and Virgin.

In 2006, Zukerman and Paul Pflug formed Principal Communications Group in Los Angeles, with both serving as managing partners. The firm provided corporate communications services in the entertainment, business and philanthropic sectors. Its clients included Disney, Marvel Studios, Legendary, Bad Robot, Live Nation and Warner Bros., as well as Skydance and RedBird Capital Partners.

Zukerman was an adviser to Skydance chief executive David Ellison.

=== Merger with Paramount Global ===
In July 2024, Skydance agreed to merge with Paramount Global and its controlling shareholder, National Amusements, in a transaction valued at approximately $8 billion. The deal closed on August 7, 2025, creating Paramount Skydance, with Ellison as chairman and chief executive. Zukerman served as Ellison's communications lead through the merger.

In August 2025, Zukerman was named chief communications officer of Paramount Skydance as part of the leadership team announced ahead of the merger's completion. In the role she served as the company's chief spokesperson and oversaw its global communications and corporate social responsibility functions.

=== Acquisition of Warner Bros. Discovery ===
Paramount Skydance soon pursued an acquisition of Warner Bros. Discovery. In December 2025, Netflix agreed to acquire Warner Bros.' studios and streaming business in a transaction valued at $82.7 billion, while Paramount continued to bid for the whole company. In February 2026, the Warner Bros. Discovery board determined that Paramount's revised all-cash offer of $31 per share was superior, and the companies signed a definitive agreement on February 27, 2026, valuing Warner Bros. Discovery at $81 billion in equity and $110 billion including debt. Zukerman led communications for Paramount through the acquisition.

The transaction closed on October 6, 2026, and the combined company was renamed Skydance Corporation. Ellison retained Zukerman as chief communications officer of the new company.
