= Jeremy Latcham =

American film producer and studio executive

- Occupations: Film producer; studio executive
- Employers: Marvel Studios; Latcham Pictures; DC Studios
- Title: President and chief creative officer of DC Studios (starting December 1, 2026)
- Predecessor: James Gunn and Peter Safran

Jeremy Latcham is an American film producer and studio executive known for his work at Marvel Studios on several films in the Marvel Cinematic Universe. On November 9, 2026, he was appointed president and chief creative officer of DC Studios, succeeding James Gunn and Peter Safran. He is scheduled to assume the position on December 1, 2026.

== Career ==
=== Marvel Studios ===
Latcham joined Marvel Studios in 2004 as David Maisel's assistant, after working with him at Endeavor Talent Agency. He eventually became Kevin Feige's assistant, before rising to a senior vice president of production and development at Marvel Studios, and was considered Feige's "right hand man". Latcham's credits at Marvel Studios included the following Marvel Cinematic Universe films: Iron Man (2008), Iron Man 2 (2010), The Avengers (2012), Guardians of the Galaxy (2014), Avengers: Age of Ultron (2015), and Spider-Man: Homecoming (2017). In 2017, he left the company.

=== Latcham Pictures ===
Following his departure from Marvel Studios, Latcham founded his own production company, Latcham Pictures, which had various first-look deals with 20th Century Fox, Hasbro Entertainment, and Wonder Project. His projects included producing the films Bad Times at the El Royale (2018) and Dungeons & Dragons: Honor Among Thieves (2023). At the time of his hiring at DC Studios, Latcham was developing a Dungeons & Dragons sequel, an Action Man film, and was planned to produce Destin Daniel Cretton's Naruto film.

Latcham stated on the Bible Bros podcast that his main goal while producing movies for Wonder Project, a faith-based entertainment company, was to promote "faith in God, obviously, faith in country, faith in family, faith in fathers [...], the idea of America, the idea of a democratic, free, capitalist society. All these things that we take for granted, that people are losing faith in on the daily like, ‘How do we make these things that we believe in front and center in these movies?'" He also, in 2025, Latcham launched a fellowship for screenwriters with Wonder Project which produced like the House of David, a studio which Latcham previously worked with, on films such as The Breadwinner.

=== DC Studios ===
On November 9, 2026, Skydance announced Latcham's appointment as president and chief creative officer of DC Studios, replacing James Gunn and Peter Safran. His appointment followed the acquisition of Warner Bros. Discovery by Paramount Skydance. In his new position, he will oversee the studio's film, television, and animation productions, as well as its creative development and production strategy. Latcham is scheduled to officially begin his duties on December 1, 2026. He will report to Dana Goldberg and Josh Greenstein, co-presidents of Skydance Motion Picture Group. TheWrap reported that David Ellison had been in discussions with Latcham about taking over DC Studios more than a month before the acquisition had been completed. While Newsweek stated that Latcham had discussed his beliefs as a Christian and a filmmaking that centers "on redemption, heroism and stories capable of connecting with ordinary families," stating that there is no confirmation that DC Studios will "adopt a more explicitly Christian or family-focused creative direction," comments which Screen Rant echoed, others expressed concern about his comments to the Christian Broadcasting Network, his possible impact on the studio's creative direction, and asked whether his possible changes would resonate with those who watch the studio's films or not.

== Personal life ==
Latcham is a Christian. He is a member of the Media for Texas advisory council.

== Selected filmography ==
Producer

- Iron Man (2008) (associate producer)
- Iron Man 2 (2010) (co-producer)
- Bad Times at the El Royale (2018)
- Dungeons & Dragons: Honor Among Thieves (2023)
- The Breadwinner (2026)

Executive producer

- The Avengers (2012)
- Guardians of the Galaxy (2014)
- Avengers: Age of Ultron (2015)
- Spider-Man: Homecoming (2017)
