= Nick Counter =

American lawyer

James Nicholas Counter III (1940 – November 6, 2009) was an American labor attorney, who served as the long-standing president of the Alliance of Motion Picture and Television Producers and as chief negotiator for the major studios who squared off against Hollywood's writers during a 100-day strike in 2008. Counter died on November 6, 2009, at the age of sixty-nine. He was survived by a son, Nicholas; a daughter, Samantha, and her husband, producer and screenwriter Alex Kurtzman; and a grandson, Jack.
