= Skydance =

American mass media conglomerate

Skydance Corporation
- Logo used since 2026 (Note: The logo was introduced and first used by Skydance Media since December 19, 2020.)

- One Astor Plaza, the company's corporate headquarters in Manhattan, New York City
- Formerly: Paramount Skydance Corporation (2025–2026)
- Type: Public
- Traded as: NYSE: SKYD (2026–present); Nasdaq: PSKY (2025–2026); S&P 500 component
- ISIN: US69932A2042
- Industry: Media; entertainment
- Predecessors: Skydance Media; Paramount Global; National Amusements; Warner Bros. Discovery
- Founded: August 7, 2025; 15 months ago (as Paramount Skydance Corporation)
- Founder: David Ellison
- Headquarters: One Astor Plaza, New York, United States
- Area served: Worldwide (except Russia, Belarus and North Korea)
- Key people: David Ellison (chairman and CEO); Ynon Kreiz (co-CEO); Andy Gordon (president)
- Products: films; television shows; video games; music
- Brands: Paramount; Warner Bros.; DC; Paramount+; HBO Max; CNN; CBS; Nickelodeon; Cartoon Network; Discovery
- Services: Film production; licensing; broadcasting; streaming; television
- Revenue: ▼US$28.9 billion (2025)
- Operating income: ▲US$934 million (2025)
- Net income: ▼US$−621 million (2025)
- Total assets: ▼US$43.3 billion (2025)
- Total equity: ▼US$11.7 billion (2025)
- Owners: Ellison family (47.2%; 77.5% voting control); RedBird Capital (13%; 22.5% voting control); PIF (15.1%); L'imad (12.8%); QIA (10.6%)
- Number of employees: 53,100 (2026)
- Divisions: Skydance Studios; Skydance Direct-to-Consumer; Skydance TV
- Subsidiaries: List of assets owned by Skydance
- Website: skydance.com

Skydance Corporation (doing business as Skydance, formerly Paramount Skydance Corporation) is an American multinational mass media and entertainment conglomerate headquartered at One Astor Plaza in Times Square, Midtown Manhattan, with primary creative centers at the Paramount lot in Hollywood and the Warner Bros. lot in Burbank. Founded on August 7, 2025 as Paramount Skydance, it was formed through the merger of Paramount Global and Skydance Media. Shortly after, it pursued an acquisition of Warner Bros. Discovery, with the deal closing on October 6, 2026. Upon the acquisition's completion, the company renamed itself as Skydance.

David Ellison leads Skydance as its chairman and CEO alongside co-CEO Ynon Kreiz, and the company trades on the New York Stock Exchange under the ticker symbol SKYD. Ellison and his father Larry Ellison own the majority of the company, with a 77.5% majority stake of Skydance's voting shares and 47.2% of all shares. RedBird Capital owns a minority stake composed of 22.5% of the voting shares and 13% of all shares.

Skydance operates one of the largest film and television production businesses in Hollywood, and its studio operations include two major film studios Paramount Pictures and Warner Bros. Pictures, as well as DC Studios and several other studios and labels such as New Line Cinema, Warner Bros. Clockwork, Republic Pictures and Skydance Animation. Its television businesses include the CBS television network, premium cable networks such as HBO, two sports networks CBS Sports and TNT Sports, as well as an extensive lineup of basic cable networks which includes MTV, Discovery Channel, TLC, HGTV, Nickelodeon, TBS and Cartoon Network. Its direct-to-consumer properties encompass two major streaming services HBO Max and Paramount+, as well as Discovery+ and Pluto TV. It also operates an independent editorial board which oversees its news networks such as CNN and CBS News.

== Background ==
=== National Amusements ===
National Amusements logo (2000–2025)

National Amusements was founded by Michael Redstone, and later passed to his son Sumner Redstone. After his death on August 11, 2020, the company was passed to a trust led by his daughter Shari Redstone.

It was a movie theater operator and mass media holding company incorporated in Maryland and based in Norwood, Massachusetts, controlled by the Redstone family. The company owned 69 theaters and 667 screens throughout the United States, the United Kingdom, and Latin America under several brands, such as Showcase Cinemas, Multiplex Cinemas, and Cinema de Lux. It was the controlling shareholder of Paramount Global.

=== Paramount Global ===
Paramount Global logo (2022–2025)

The origins of Paramount Global can be traced to Paramount Pictures, established in 1912, and the development of CBS and Viacom as major broadcasting and media businesses. Paramount Pictures was acquired by Gulf and Western Industries (later known as Paramount Communications) in 1966, while National Amusements, controlled by the Redstone family, acquired Viacom in 1987. Viacom subsequently acquired Paramount Communications in 1994 and merged with CBS Corporation in 2000.

In 2005, Viacom was split into the second incarnations of CBS Corporation and Viacom. The two companies reunited in December 2019 to form ViacomCBS, which was renamed Paramount Global in February 2022. The company operated film, television, streaming and broadcasting businesses, including Paramount Pictures, CBS, Nickelodeon, MTV, Paramount+ and Pluto TV.

=== Skydance Media ===
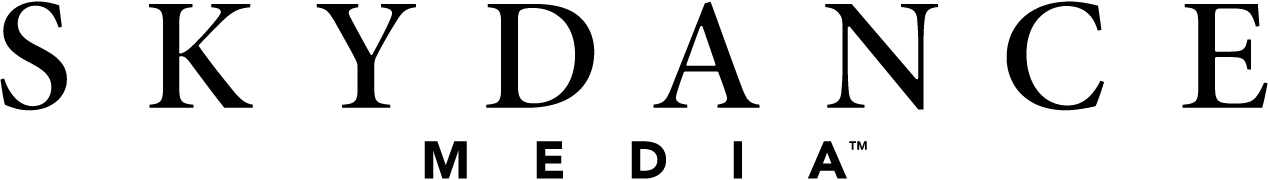
Skydance Media logo (2016–2020)

Skydance Media was founded by film producer David Ellison in 2006 as an independent film production and financing company. It developed a longstanding relationship with Paramount Pictures since 2009, co-financing and producing films in franchises including Mission: Impossible, Star Trek and Terminator.

Skydance expanded beyond feature films into television, animation and interactive entertainment. Its television division launched in 2013, while its interactive entertainment business was established following the acquisition of game developer The Workshop Entertainment in 2016. In 2017, the company expanded into animation through a partnership with Spain's Ilion Animation Studios. In February 2020, Skydance received a $275 million investment from RedBird Capital Partners and CJ ENM, valuing the company at $2.3 billion.

=== Warner Bros. Discovery ===
Warner Bros. Discovery logo (2022–2026)

Warner Bros. Discovery was formed on April 8, 2022, through the combination of WarnerMedia, then owned by AT&T, and Discovery, Inc. The transaction brought together WarnerMedia's film, television, news and entertainment operations with Discovery's factual programming and international television businesses.

The company's businesses included Warner Bros. Pictures, Warner Bros. Television, New Line Cinema, DC, HBO, CNN, Cartoon Network, Discovery Channel, TLC, Food Network and Warner Bros. Games. Its streaming services included HBO Max and Discovery+.

== History ==
=== Formation of Paramount Skydance (2023–2025) ===
In 2023, National Amusements, the controlling shareholder of Paramount Global, began exploring potential transactions involving the media conglomerate amid financial difficulties and increasing competition in the entertainment industry. Several companies expressed interest in acquiring or partnering with Paramount, including Skydance Media, Sony Pictures, Apollo Global Management and Warner Bros. Discovery.

Negotiations between Paramount and Skydance initially collapsed in June 2024, but resumed the following month. On July 7, 2024, the companies announced a definitive agreement for a transaction involving the acquisition of National Amusements and the combination of Paramount Global and Skydance Media. The agreement included an investment of more than $8 billion from the Ellison family and RedBird Capital Partners. David Ellison, founder and chief executive of Skydance Media, was designated to lead the combined company, with Jeff Shell as president.

The transaction underwent regulatory review throughout 2025. The Federal Communications Commission approved the merger on July 24, 2025, clearing a major remaining regulatory hurdle. The combination was completed on August 7, 2025, establishing Paramount Skydance Corporation. Ellison assumed the positions of chairman and chief executive officer, and the company's Class B shares began trading on the Nasdaq under the ticker symbol PSKY.

=== Paramount Skydance (2025–2026) ===
Paramount Skydance logo (2025–2026)

Following the merger, Paramount Skydance reorganized its operations into three principal business segments: studios, direct-to-consumer and television media. Its initial leadership included Andy Gordon as chief operating officer, Cindy Holland as chair of direct-to-consumer, George Cheeks as chair of television media, and Dana Goldberg and Josh Greenstein as co-chairs of Paramount Pictures. The company also revived Paramount Television Studios, combining the operations of Skydance Television and Showtime/MTV Entertainment Studios.

In August 2025, Paramount announced a seven-year agreement with TKO Group Holdings valued at approximately $7.7 billion, giving Paramount+ exclusive United States distribution rights to Ultimate Fighting Championship events beginning in 2026, with selected events also airing on CBS. The following month, Paramount Pictures entered a three-year worldwide theatrical distribution agreement with Legendary Entertainment, beginning with the film Street Fighter.

On October 6, 2025, Paramount announced its acquisition of the digital news publication The Free Press, appointing its founder Bari Weiss as editor-in-chief of CBS News. Later that month, the company began a restructuring program involving approximately 2,000 planned job reductions, following its earlier announcement of a target to reduce operating costs by about $2 billion.

==== Acquisition of Warner Bros. Discovery (2025–2026) ====
In June 2025, Warner Bros. Discovery (WBD) announced plans to separate its studios and streaming businesses from its television networks by splitting into two publicly traded companies. The proposed restructuring attracted interest from several potential acquirers, including Netflix and Comcast. Paramount Skydance, which had already been interested in acquiring all assets of WBD prior to the announcement of the split, made several bids to acquire WBD, which were rejected by the company's board. In December 2025, WBD entered into an agreement for Netflix to acquire its studios and streaming operations, including Warner Bros. Pictures, HBO and HBO Max, following the separation of its television networks.

Paramount continued pursuing an acquisition of WBD, submitting revised offers for the entire company. On February 26, 2026, WBD's board determined that Paramount's final proposal of $31 per share in cash constituted a superior proposal to its existing Netflix agreement. Netflix declined to increase its offer and withdrew from the bidding process. On February 27, Paramount Skydance and WBD announced a definitive agreement under which Paramount would acquire WBD for approximately $81 billion in equity value and $110 billion in enterprise value.

WBD shareholders approved the transaction on April 23, 2026. The proposed acquisition subsequently faced antitrust litigation from a coalition of twelve U.S. states and the Writers Guild of America. In September, Paramount and WBD reached settlements resolving these challenges. The states' settlement included commitments concerning theatrical film output, increased domestic production investment, television distribution practices and editorial independence safeguards for CBS News and CNN. A federal court approved the states' consent decree on September 30, allowing the transaction to proceed.

=== Skydance (2026–present) ===
On October 6, 2026, Paramount Skydance completed its acquisition of Warner Bros. Discovery. Under the transaction, a subsidiary of Paramount Skydance merged into WBD, which survived as a wholly owned subsidiary of the acquiring company. Paramount Skydance Corporation subsequently changed its legal name to Skydance Corporation, officially dropping "Paramount". Its Class B common stock transferred from Nasdaq to the New York Stock Exchange, changing its ticker symbol from PSKY to SKYD, while WBD shares ceased trading independently.

David Ellison remained chairman and chief executive officer of Skydance, while former Mattel chief executive Ynon Kreiz became co-chief executive officer, responsible for day-to-day operations and integration. Andy Gordon became president, while other appointments included Casey Bloys to oversee streaming content and Dana Goldberg and Josh Greenstein to lead the combined motion picture group. The company announced plans to integrate its streaming operations and pursue at least $6 billion in annual cost savings within three years.

== Divisions ==
Skydance operates businesses in film and television production, streaming, broadcasting, news, sports, video games, publishing and consumer products.

=== Film and television studios ===
The logos of Paramount Pictures and Warner Bros. Pictures, representing two of the three major film production businesses associated with Skydance.

Skydance Motion Picture Group oversees the company's theatrical film production and distribution operations. Led by Dana Goldberg and Josh Greenstein, it encompasses the Paramount Pictures and Warner Bros. Pictures film studios and their associated production labels.

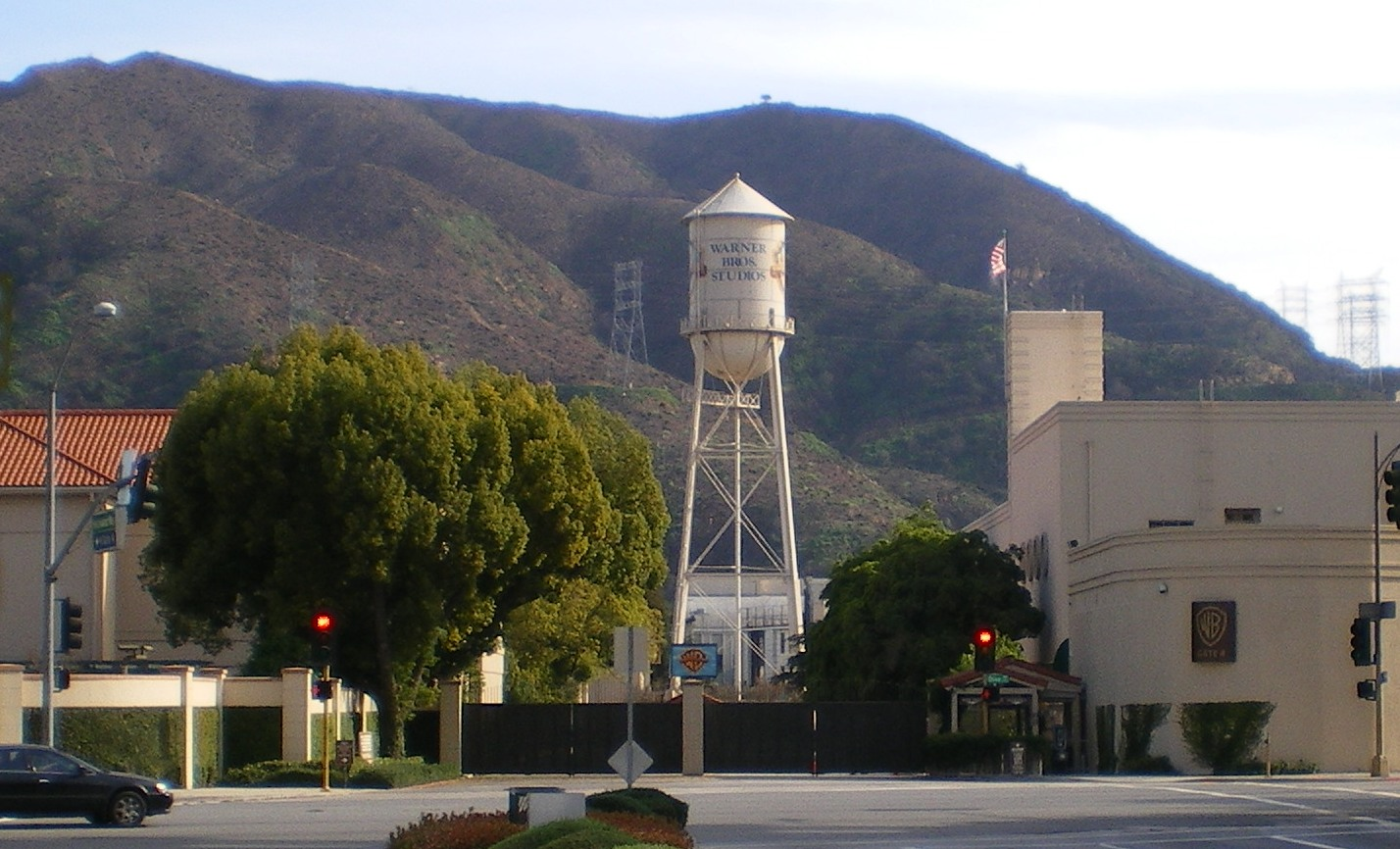
Warner Bros. Studios in Burbank

- Paramount Pictures includes Paramount Animation, Paramount Players, Nickelodeon Movies and Republic Pictures, alongside film production and distribution operations. Related businesses include Skydance Animation, Skydance Animation Madrid and the company's 49% interest in Miramax. The company is led by Kira Goldberg and Don Granger.
- Warner Bros. Pictures operates alongside labels including New Line Cinema, Warner Bros. Clockwork, Warner Bros. Pictures Animation and Warner Bros. International operations. The company's film businesses also include theatrical distribution, home entertainment, studio facilities and the company's 5% stake in Spyglass Media Group. The company is led by Jesse Ehrman.
- DC Studios develops film, television, animation and other adaptations based on characters published by DC Comics. The studio is led by James Gunn and Peter Safran, though Jeremy Latcham will take over starting on December 1, 2026.

Skydance TV encompasses the company's television production studios and television network businesses. Its production operations include Warner Bros. Television, CBS Studios and Paramount Television Studios, along with animation businesses via Skydance Television Animation such as Nickelodeon Animation Studios, Warner Bros. Animation, Cartoon Network Studios and Hanna-Barbera Studios Europe. The division is co-led by George Cheeks and JB Perrette. In early 2027, Warner Bros. Television and Paramount Television Studios will combine into a single studio, Warner Bros. Television Studios, with Channing Dungey and Matt Thunell reporting to Cheeks. Th

=== Television networks ===
Skydance TV oversees the combined company's broadcast and cable television businesses in the United States and internationally.

==== Cable television ====
Skydance Global Cable Media divides cable networks into unscripted lifestyle, broad-based entertainment, talent/music/live, and comedy/animation. In unscripted lifestyle, Joe Boyle reports to Betsy Sanner Ayala. In broad-based entertainment, Alon Ornstein reports to Jason Sarlanis. In talent/music/live, Sitarah Pendelton, Brian Rikuda, and Aisha Summers-Burke report to Tina Perry. In comedy/animation, Peter Girardi, Alec Botnick, and Ari Pearce report to Michael Ouweleen.

Paramount Studios in Hollywood

The subdivision includes the former CBS Entertainment Group's properties (notably encompasses the CBS television network, owned-and-operated television stations and CBS Media Ventures), former Paramount Media Networks' channels (notably MTV, Nickelodeon, Comedy Central, BET, CMT, Paramount Network, TV Land and Smithsonian Channel), former Warner Bros. Discovery's television channels (notably Discovery Channel, TLC, HGTV, Food Network, Animal Planet, Investigation Discovery, TNT, TBS, Cartoon Network, Adult Swim, Turner Classic Movies and Oprah Winfrey Network), international television networks (notably 5 in the United Kingdom, Network 10 in Australia, TVN in Poland, and those formerly operated by Paramount and Warner Bros. Discovery).

==== News and sports ====
Skydance owns two major television news organizations, CBS News and CNN. CBS News is led by editor-in-chief Bari Weiss, while Mark Thompson serves as chairman and editor-in-chief of CNN Worldwide. Both report to David Ellison and Ynon Kreiz.

Its sports broadcasting and production businesses (under the subdivision's name Skydance Global Sports Group) include CBS Sports, TNT Sports, CBS Sports Network, Eurosport and Paramount Sports Entertainment. The latter includes Skydance Sports, which produces scripted and unscripted sports programming and develops sports-related entertainment projects. David Berson serves as the chairman of Skydance Global Sports Group.

=== Consumer products, publishing, gaming and experiences ===
Skydance Products & Publishing oversees the combined company's consumer products, publishing, merchandising, and licensing efforts associated with its intellectual properties via its Paramount Consumer Products, Warner Bros. Discovery Global Experiences, Paramount Global Publishing, and DC Comics units.

Its interactive entertainment and experiences division includes Paramount Games Studio and Warner Bros. Games, which publish and develop video games based on company-owned and licensed intellectual properties. The broader portfolio also encompasses the licensing of attractions and experiences associated with Warner Bros., Paramount, and DC properties.

=== Streaming and direct-to-consumer ===
Skydance Direct-to-Consumer oversees the company's subscription-based, advertising-supported streaming businesses, and domestic premium pay TV networks. Its principal services include Paramount+, HBO, HBO Max, Discovery+, Pluto TV, Paramount+ with Showtime, and its interest in SkyShowtime, a joint venture with Comcast.

The division is led by Casey Bloys, co-chair and chief content officer, and JB Perrette, co-chair and chief business officer. Bloys oversees original programming across HBO Max and Paramount+, while Perrette oversees areas including distribution, strategy, marketing and business operations. Following the acquisition, Skydance announced plans to integrate its streaming operations.

== Corporate affairs ==
=== Board of Directors ===
- David Ellison (Chairman)
- Barbara Byrne
- Andy Campion
- Gerry Cardinale
- Safra Catz
- Andy Gordon
- Justin G. Hamill
- Laurene Powell Jobs
- Bobby Kotick
- Ynon Kreiz
- Sherry Lansing
- Paul Marinelli
- John L. Thornton
- Tony Blair (Advisor)

=== Enterprise leadership ===
- David Ellison – Chair and Chief Executive Officer
- Ynon Kreiz – Co-Chief Executive Officer

=== Corporate leadership team ===
- Andy Gordon – President
  - Tony Driscoll – President, Games and Experiences
  - Jeff Silberman – Executive Vice President, Corporate Strategy
  - Jim Sterner – Chief People Officer
  - Jose Turkienicz – President, Global Operations
- Dennis Cinelli – Chief Financial Officer
  - Josh Walker – Chief Operating Officer, Chief Financial Officer, and Chief Strategy Officer, Skydance DTC
  - Liz Wright – Chief Financial Officer, Skydance TV
- Makan Delrahim – Chief Legal Officer and President, Global Corporate Affairs
  - Stephanie Kyoko McKinnon – General Counsel and Secretary
- Dane Glasgow – Chief Product Officer
- Rebecca Mall – Chief Marketing Officer
  - Mike Benson – Head of TV Marketing
    - Seth Goren – Head of Media, TV
  - Chris Ender – Head of Communcation and Publicity
  - Annah Zafrani – Head of Cross-company Marketing and Brand
    - Katie Hutchings – Senior Vice President, Brand Marketing, Creative and Strategy
  - Angie Sharma – Head of Franchise and Kids and Family
  - Jamal Salmon – Head of Marketing Data and Analytics
  - Michelle Hagen – Head of Brand Partnerships
  - Julie Moore – Executive Vice President of Brand Partnerships, Theatrical
  - Malene Sam – Senior Vice President, Originals, DTC and TV
  - Seth Goren – Head of Media
- Melissa Zukerman – Chief Communications Officer
  - Jeff Cusson – Executive Vice President and Head of Communications, Skydance DTC
- Hugh Williams – Chief Engineer and Executive Vice President, Consumer and Monetization Engineering
  - Jamal Salmon – Head of Marketing Data and Analytics

=== Business leadership team ===
- Casey Bloys – Co-Chair and Chief Content Officer, Skydance Direct-to-Consumer
  - Glenn Whitehead – President and Chief Operating Officer, HBO and Paramount+
  - Francesca Orsi – President, HBO Drama Series and Films
  - Sarah Aubrey – Head of Paramount+, Max Originals and International Programming
  - Amy Gravitt – Executive Vice President, HBO Programming, Head of HBO and HBO Max Comedy Series
  - Nina Rosenstein – Executive Vice President, HBO Late Night and Specials Programming
  - Nancy Abraham – Co-Executive Vice President, HBO Documentary Programming
  - Lisa Heller – Co-Executive Vice President, HBO Documentary Programming
  - Jeff Cusson – Executive Vice President and Head of Communications, Skydance DTC
- George Cheeks – Co-Chair and Chief Content Officer, Skydance TV
  - Channing Dungey – Chair, Skydance Global Cable Media and President, Warner Bros. Television Studios
    - Ronald Goes – President, Warner Bros. International Television Production
  - Matt Thunell – President, Warner Bros. Television Studios
  - David Stapf – President, CBS Studios
  - David Berson – Chair, Global Sports Group
    - Jeff Gerttula – Executive Vice President and Managing Director
      - Bennett Spector Executive Vice President and General Manager, Bleacher Report and House of Highlights
      - Yang Adija – Digital Strategy and Operations
    - Craig Barry – Executive Vice President and Chief Content Officer
    - Patty Power – Executive Vice President, Operations and Engineering
    - Dan Weinberg – Executive Vice President, Programming
    - Chris Carter – Executive Vice President, Chief Financial Officer
    - Kelly Dunne – Executive Vice President, Marketing
    - Jen Sabatelle – Executive Vice President, Communications
    - Bryn Berglund – Senior Vice President, Human Resources
    - Doug Bernstein – Senior Vice President, Insights and Audience Strategy
    - Kevin Glidewell – Senior Vice President, Legal
    - Deanna O’Toole – Senior Vice President, Business Affairs
  - Amy Reisenbach – President, CBS Entertainment
  - Tom Cibrowski – President and Executive Editor, CBS News
  - Bryon Rubin – Chief Operating Officer
  - Jennifer Mitchell – President, CBS Television Stations
  - Laurel Weir – Head of Programming and Strategic Insights and Research
  - Mike Benson – Head of TV Marketing
    - Seth Goren – Head of Media, TV
  - Chris Ender – Head of Communcation and Publicity
- Dana Goldberg – Co-Chair, Skydance Motion Picture Group
- Josh Greenstein – Co-Chair, Skydance Motion Picture Group
  - Kira Goldberg – President, Motion Picture Group, Paramount Pictures
  - Don Granger – President, Motion Picture Group, Paramount Pictures
  - Jesse Ehrman – President, Motion Picture Group, Warner Bros. Pictures
  - Jeremy Latcham – President and Chief Creative Officer, DC Studios
  - Richard Brener – President and Chief Creative Officer of New Line Cinema
  - Lia Buman – Executive Vice President and Head of Global Acquisitions, Republic Pictures
  - J.D. Lifshitz – Head of Paramount Primal
  - Raphael Margules – Head of Paramount Primal
  - Christian Parkes – Head of Warner Bros. Clockwork
  - Charlie Tabesh – Senior Vice President and General Manager, Turner Classic Movies
  - Courtney Armstrong – Chief Operating Officer
  - Mark Badagliacca – Chief Financial Officer
  - Brooke Robertson – Executive Vice President, Head of Global Communications and Media Relations
  - Talia Robinson – Executive Vice President, Human Resources
  - Josh Goldstine – President of Worldwide Marketing and Distribution
    - Dana Nussbaum – Co-Head of Global Motion Pictures Marketing, Warner Bros.
      - Seth Goren – Head of Media, Theatrical
    - Christian Davin – Co-Head of Global Motion Pictures Marketing, Warner Bros.
    - John Stanford – Head of Global Creative Strategy, Warner Bros.
    - Julie Moore – Executive Vice President of Brand Partnerships
    - Shaun Barber – Head of Domestic Distribution
    - Mark Viane – Head of International Distribution
    - Jamal Salmon – Head of Marketing Data and Analytics
  - Josh Silverman – President, Consumer Products and Publishing
    - Jim Lee – President, Publisher and Chief Creative Officer, DC Comics
    - Mark Kaufman – Executive Vice President abd Chief Content Officer, Theatre Ventures
- JB Perrette – Co-Chair and Chief Business Officer, Skydance TV and Skydance Direct-to-Consumer
  - Jay Askinasi – Chief Revenue Officer, Advertising
  - David Decker – President, Skydance Global Content Sales
  - Ray Hopkins – President, Distribution
  - Channing Dungey – Chair, Skydance Global Cable Media and President, Warner Bros. Television Studios
  - Jeff Cusson – Executive Vice President and Head of Communications, Skydance DTC
  - Shauna Spenley – Chief Marketing Officer, Global DTC and International TV
    - Malene Sam – Senior Vice President, Originals
    - Seth Goren – Head of Media, DTC
  - Trey Turner – Chief Operating Officer, International
  - Josh Walker – Chief Operating Officer, Chief Financial Officer, and Chief Strategy Officer, Skydance DTC
    - Jamal Salmon – Head of Marketing Data and Analytics
  - Liz Wright – Chief Financial Officer, Skydance TV
  - Andrew Georgiou – President and Managing Director, Europe and Africa
  - James Gibbons – President and Managing Director, Asia-Pacific and Middle East & North Africa
  - Kasia Kieli – President and Managing Director, Poland
  - Fernando Medin – President and Managing Director, Latin America and Hispanic United States
  - Leah Hooper – Regional Streaming Lead, Europe

=== News leadership team ===
- Mark Thompson – Chair and Editor-in-Chief, CNN Worldwide
- Bari Weiss – Editor-in-Chief, CBS News
