= Dana Goldberg =

Dana Goldberg may refer to:

- Dana Goldberg (director) (born 1979), Israeli poet, filmmaker and playwright
- Dana Goldberg (comedian) (born 1976), American comedian
- Dana Goldberg (producer), American studio executive and film producer
