= United Nations building =

The United Nations building may refer to one of the following:

- Headquarters of the United Nations, in New York City
  - United Nations Secretariat Building, the flagship structure in that building
  - United Nations General Assembly Building
- Palace of Nations
- United Nations Office at Geneva
- United Nations Office at Nairobi
- United Nations Office at Vienna
