= Josh Greenstein =

American film executive (born 1974)

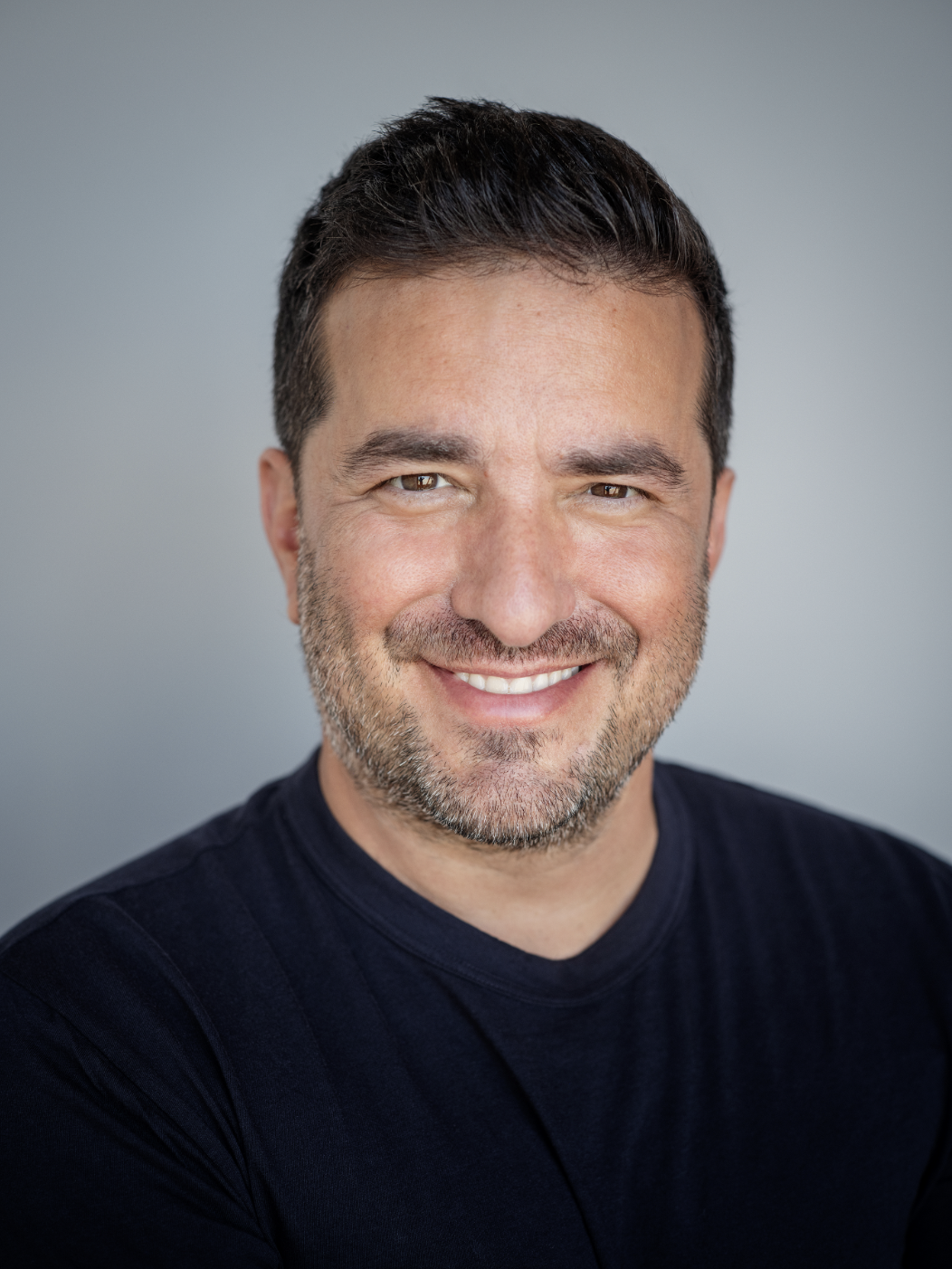
- Greenstein in 2025
- Born: 1974 (age 51–52); Kansas City, Missouri, U.S.
- Education: Boston University
- Occupation: Studio executive
- Years active: 1999–present
- Title: Co-chair of Skydance Motion Picture Group

Josh Greenstein is an American studio executive, serving as co-chair of Skydance Motion Picture Group overseeing operations for both Warner Bros. Pictures & Paramount Pictures.

== Career ==
=== Early years ===
Born in 1974 at the Menorah Medical Center of Kansas City, Missouri. Greenstein attended Boston University and earned a degree in communications, with which he planned to work in journalism. Following college, he took assistant jobs with film and television producers at independent film studio Dimension Films. In 2001, Greenstein was promoted to head of marketing at Dimension. Greenstein is Jewish and made his Bar Mitzvah at age 13 at Israel’s Western Wall of Jerusalem.

=== Paramount Pictures ===
Greenstein joined Paramount Pictures in 2005. Greenstein served as executive vice president of advertising and co-president of marketing.

In 2011 He was promoted to chief marketing officer for Paramount Pictures, and served in the role until December 2014. He led the global marketing campaigns for films The Wolf of Wall Street, Paranormal Activity and Transformers: Age of Extinction.

=== Sony Pictures ===
In September 2014, Greenstein joined Sony Pictures Motion Picture Group as president of worldwide marketing and distribution. He was hired by film producer and studio executive Amy Pascal, and oversaw the studio's marketing campaigns under its chairman, Tom Rothman. In this role, Greenstein was responsible for global theatrical marketing and distribution of Sony's labels. During this time he oversaw the marketing campaigns for the Jumanji and Spider-Man franchises.

In October 2019, Greenstein was named co-president of Sony Pictures Motion Picture Group alongside film industry executive Sanford Pantich. Greenstein contributed Marvel Studios' Spider-Man: Far From Home in 2019, which became the studio's highest-grossing film of all time, earning $1.13 billion worldwide as of October 2019. In July 2025 it was announced that Greenstein would be leaving his role for a new role at Paramount following its sale to production and media financing company Skydance Media.

=== Paramount Skydance ===
In August 2025, Greenstein was named co-chair of Paramount Pictures alongside Skydance's chief content officer and producer, Dana Goldberg. Greenstein was also appointed to serve as the chair of Paramount platforms, where he oversees the film studio, as well as strategic long-term planning of streaming platforms, oversight of production, distribution and marketing.

In August 2025, within five hours of the announcement of their appointments, Greenstein and Goldberg secured actor Timothée Chalamet and director James Mangold for the upcoming film High Side, marking the first collaboration between Chalamet and Mangold since the biographical film A Complete Unknown. That year, Greenstein brokered deals with the Duffer Brothers, creators of Netflix's Stranger Things franchise, and announced live-action film adaptation of video game franchises Call of Duty, with Activision, and Street Fighter, with Legendary Entertainment.

In December 2025, Greenstein entered into a three-year first-look deal with American filmmaker Jon M. Chu, under which Chu and his production company Electric Company relocated to the Paramount lot.

In March 2026, Scream 7 earned approximately $100M globally during opening weekend; Greenstein took oversight of the film as part of his new role as co-chair. In April 2026, Greenstein and Goldberg presented at Cinema United's CinemaCon, a convention for movie theater owners based in Las Vegas, where they outlined a slate of upcoming theatrical releases, including entries from the Top Gun, Scary Movie, Jackass and World War Z franchises, as well as the films Tomorrow, and Tomorrow and Tomorrow (based on the novel of the same name) and American singer and actor Teyana Taylor's directorial debut Get Lite. At the presentation, they debuted a short reel by Chu, featuring actors and filmmakers from the Paramount lot, including James Cameron and Tom Cruise.

In May 2026, Greenstein and Goldberg announced a first-look deal with Warner Music Group. In July 2026, Greenstein brokered a first-look deal between Paramount Pictures and rapper Travis Scott's record label and music publishing company, Cactus Jack Records. Also in 2026, comparable three-year first-look deals were struck with director Dan Trachtenberg, whose film Predator: Badlands became the highest-grossing entry in the Predator franchise, with actress and writer Issa Rae and actor Will Smith and his entertainment company Westbrook.

On October 5, 2026, Paramount Skydance announced the new leadership structure for the company, now known as Skydance Corporation after its acquisition of Warner Bros Discovery. Dana Goldberg and Josh Greenstein were named co-chairmen of the Skydance Motion Picture Group, with responsibility for the vision, strategy, operations, production, development, business affairs, marketing and distribution of Paramount Pictures, Warner Bros. Pictures and the company's broader film portfolio.

== Filmography ==
Producer

- A Civil Action (1998)
- Twilight (1998)
- Wonder Boys (2000)
- Impostor (2001)
