= The Boy, the Mole, the Fox and the Horse (soundtrack) =

The Boy, the Mole, the Fox and the Horse (Official Short Film Soundtrack)

Film score by Isobel Waller-Bridge
- Released: 23 December 2022
- Recorded: 2021–2022
- Genre: Film score
- Length: 27:18
- Label: Sony Masterworks

Isobel Waller-Bridge chronology
| I Came By (2022) | The Boy, the Mole, the Fox and the Horse (2022) | The Lesson (2023) |

The Boy, the Mole, the Fox and the Horse (Official Short Film Soundtrack) is the soundtrack accompanying the 2022 animated short film of the same name directed by Peter Baynton and Charlie Mackesy. Featuring musical score composed by Isobel Waller-Bridge, the soundtrack featured 18 cues from the film score performed by the BBC Concert Orchestra. It was released by Sony Masterworks on 23 December 2022.

== Development ==
"What was so wonderful about Charlie's book is that because of the scarcity of words, he's very direct with what you know…. I think what Charlie did so magnificently is take us on an emotional journey without it being without lots of words. And that was really wonderful. And so just really absorbing that and sitting at the piano, sort of peacefully trying to sort of express that in the music was really the process."

— Isobel Waller-Bridge

The film's music is composed by Isobel Waller-Bridge in her maiden animated composition. Charlie Mackesy met Waller-Bridge, to write a music piece for the audiobook based on the illustrated novel. She liked the source material on the first read, calling it as "beautiful, gentle and kind of profound in the illustrations" and further credited to Mackesy as she thought that the score, and the actual material from the book, are being closely related.

The musical choices were attributed to Mackesy, which led Waller-Bridge finalizing on specific instruments. Mackesy wanted a score "a score that would address people of all ages and experiences and fit with the landscapes and the messages and the content, so that it could feel serious or profound in a way that it wouldn't have been otherwise". The use of cello had been predominant throughout the score as Mackesy liked the sounds of it and combined that with the piano to serve as the basis of the score.

The music was written for over six months during the filming, simultaneously with the sound design, as each time a cue or sequence getting updated, Waller-Bridge had to work on the updated cuts with the sound designer Adrian Rhodes. The BBC Concert Orchestra performed the score, which was conducted by Geoff Alexander, with the recording remotely progressed during the COVID-19 lockdown.

One of the pieces titled "The Hint of the Robin" was written very early on production, while the film was under storyboarding, and he had to edit it to appropriately fit the piece in the film. Baynton said that the piece was "emotional and powerful as it formed the backbone of the score" while the rest of the album were variations of the piece written to the film. Waller-Bridge said that the score needed to help the audience understand the journey of the characters, as "if you took the dialogue away that would, I hope anyway, be the effect – that you can understand what was happening to the character or in the environment."

== Critical reception ==
Emily Bernard of Collider called the score as "thoughtful" accompanying the writing that "blend together to make the irresistible end product". Megan Graye of The Independent said that Waller-Bridge's score "intensifies the journey", while Cerita Sewarming of VOI.id felt that it makes the film "even more complete".

== Track listing ==
The Boy, the Mole, the Fox and the Horse (Official Short Film Soundtrack) track listing
| No. | Title | Length |
|---|---|---|
| 1. | "The Boy, the Mole, the Fox and the Horse (Opening)" | 1:53 |
| 2. | "It's a Tree" | 0:24 |
| 3. | "Climbing the Tree" | 0:31 |
| 4. | "Nothing Beats Kindness" | 0:50 |
| 5. | "Have Some Cake" | 0:47 |
| 6. | "Is There Something There" | 0:37 |
| 7. | "The Fox" | 1:08 |
| 8. | "What Was That" | 1:24 |
| 9. | "The River" | 3:03 |
| 10. | "Doing Nothing With Friends" | 2:42 |
| 11. | "How Fast Can You Run" | 0:31 |
| 12. | "You Fell" | 1:23 |
| 13. | "Being Honest Is Always Interesting" | 1:47 |
| 14. | "The Storm" | 2:04 |
| 15. | "You Are Loved and Important" | 1:00 |
| 16. | "Flying" | 2:08 |
| 17. | "Home" | 3:39 |
| 18. | "End Credits" | 1:27 |
| Total length: | | 27:18 |

== Accolades ==
Awards and nominations for The Boy, the Mole, the Fox and the Horse (Official Short Film Soundtrack)
| Award | Date of ceremony | Category | Recipient(s) | Result | Ref. |
|---|---|---|---|---|---|
| Annie Awards | 25 February 2023 | Outstanding Achievement for Music in an Animated Television / Broadcast Production | Isobel Waller-Bridge, Charlie Mackesy | Nominated | |
