= Annie Award for Outstanding Achievement for Music in an Animated Television/Broadcast Production =

Annual television award

Annie Award for Music in an Animated Television/Broadcasting Production
- Awarded for: Excellence in music for animated television/broadcasting productions
- Country: United States
- Presented by: ASIFA-Hollywood
- First award: 1997
- Currently held by: Ramin Djawadi, Shane Eli, and Johnny Pakfar – Win or Lose (2025)
- Website: annieawards.org

The Annie Award for Music in an Animated Television/Broadcasting Production is an Annie Award given annually to the best music composed for animated television or broadcasting productions. It was first given at the 25th Annie Awards, initially the category included both scores and songs from television productions.

== History ==
At the 28th Annie Awards, two categories were created, though both were only presented that year, one was for music scores especially made for television productions under the name of Outstanding Individual Achievement for Music Score in an Animated Television Production, while the other category was to reward songs from both films and television productions named Outstanding Individual Achievement for a Song in an Animated Production. Since the 30th Annie Awards, the category Outstanding Achievement for Music in a Television/Broadcast Production is presented.

== Winners and nominees ==
=== 1990s ===
Best Individual Achievement: Music in a Television Production

Year	Program	Episode(s)/Song(s)	Recipient(s)	Network
1997 (25th)
1997 (25th)	The Simpsons		Alf Clausen	Fox
1997 (25th)	Dexter's Laboratory		Thomas Chase, Steve Rucker	Cartoon Network
1997 (25th)	The Spooktacular New Adventures of Casper		Michael Tavera, Charles Fernandez, Ron Grant, Harvey Cohen	Fox Kids
1997 (25th)	Mighty Ducks: The Animated Series		Carl Johnson	ABC
1997 (25th)	Boo to You Too! Winnie the Pooh		Michael Silversher, Patty Silversher	ABC
1997 (25th)	Superman: The Animated Series	"Main Title Theme"	Shirley Walker	Kids' WB
1998 (26th)
1998 (26th)	The Simpsons	"The City of New York vs. Homer Simpson" (Song "You're Checkin' In")	Alf Clausen (music), Ken Keeler (lyrics)	Fox
1998 (26th)	Cow and Chicken	"The Ugliest Weenie, Part 2"	Bill Burnett, Guy Moon	Cartoon Network
1998 (26th)	Dexter's Laboratory	"LABretto"	David Smith, Thomas Chase, Steve Rucker	Cartoon Network
1998 (26th)	The Off-Beats: KaBlam!	"Suave-o-Matic"	Lino Sound	Nickelodeon
1998 (26th)	101 Dalmatians: The Series	"Dalmatian Vatation, Part 2" (Song: "Surf Puppies 101")	Randy Peterson, Kevin Quinn	ABC
1999 (27th)
1999 (27th)	Histeria!	Song: "That is the Story That's Told by the Bard"	Randy Rogel (composer and lyricist)	Kids' WB
1999 (27th)	Family Guy	"Main Title Song"	Walter Murphy (composer), Seth MacFarlane and David Zuckerman (lyricists)	Fox
1999 (27th)	The Sylvester & Tweety Mysteries	"The San Francisco Beat"	J. Eric Schmidt, Cameron Patrick (composers)	Kids' WB
1999 (27th)	Mickey Mouse Works	"Pluto's Arrow Error"	Stephen James Taylor	ABC

=== 2000s ===
Year	Program	Episode(s)	Recipient(s)	Network
2000 (28th)
2000 (28th)	The Simpsons	"Behind the Laughter"	Alf Clausen (music)	Fox
2000 (28th)	PB&J Otter	"Hope Castle"	Dan Swayer, Fred Newman (songwriters)	Playhouse Disney
2000 (28th)	Family Guy	"Dammit Janet"	Walter Murphy (music)	Fox
2000 (28th)	Histeria!	"Big Fat Baby Theatre"	Richard Stone, Steve Bernstein, Julie Bernstein, Gordon L. Goodwin, Timothy Kelly (composers)	Kids' WB
2000 (28th)	Mickey Mouse Works	"Halloween"	Stephen James Taylor	ABC

Outstanding Individual Achievement for a Song in an Animated Production

Year	Program	Song	Recipient(s)	Network/Studios
2001 (29th)
2001 (29th)	The Emperor's New Groove	"Perfect World"	David Hartley, Sting	Walt Disney Pictures
2001 (29th)	Lloyd in Space	"Main Title"	Jim Lang	ABC
2001 (29th)	Elmo Aardvark: Outer Space Detective!	"The Elmo Aardvark Song"	Will Ryan	Mondo Media
2001 (29th)	Tweety's High-Flying Adventure	"Around the World in 80 Puddy-Tats"	Randy Rogel	Warner Bros. Animation
2001 (29th)	SpongeBob SquarePants	"The Very First Christmas"	Peter Straus, Paul Tibbitt	Nickelodeon

Outstanding Individual Achievement for Music Score in an Animated Television Production

Year	Program	Episode(s)	Recipient(s)	Network
2001 (29th)
2001 (29th)	The Powerpuff Girls	"Meet the Beat Alls"	Thomas Chase, Steve Rucker, James L. Venable	Cartoon Network
2001 (29th)	The Zeta Project	"The Accomplice"	Kristopher Carter, Michael McCuistion, Lolita Ritmanis, Shirley Walker	Kids' WB
2001 (29th)	Max Steel	"Breakout"	Jim Latham, Nathan Furst	Kids' WB
2001 (29th)	The Fairly OddParents		Guy Moon	Nickelodeon
2001 (29th)	Invader Zim		Kevin Manthei	Nickelodeon

Outstanding Achievement for Music in an Animated Television Production

Year	Program	Episode(s)	Recipient(s)	Network
2002 (30th)
2002 (30th)	Samurai Jack	"The Beginning"	James L. Venable	Cartoon Network
2002 (30th)	The Fairly OddParents		Guy Moon (composer), Butch Hartman and Steve Marmel (lyricists)	Nickelodeon
2002 (30th)	Harold and the Purple Crayon	"Blame It on the Rain"	Van Dyke Parks, Kevin Kiner, Grant Geissman	HBO Family
2003 (31st)
2003 (31st)	The Simpsons	"Dude, Where's My Ranch?"	Alf Clausen, Ian Maxtone-Graham, Ken Keeler	Fox
2003 (31st)	Duck Dodgers	"Shiver Me Dodgers"	Robert Kral, Wayne Coyne, Steven Drozd	Cartoon Network
2003 (31st)	Teen Titans	"Divide & Conquer"	Lolita Ritmanis, Kristopher Carter, Michael McCuistion, Andy Sturmer	Cartoon Network
2003 (31st)	Futurama	"The Devil's Hands Are Idle Playthings"	Ken Keeler	Fox
2004 (32nd)
2004 (32nd)	Duck Dodgers		Robert J. Kral	Cartoon Network
2004 (32nd)	Peep and the Big Wide World		Steve D'Angelo, Terry Tompkins	Discovery Kids
2004 (32nd)	Miss Spider's Sunny Patch Friends		Jeff Danna, Steve Sullivan	Teletoon/Treehouse TV
2004 (32nd)	Wolf's Rain		Yoko Kanno	Adult Swim
2005 (33rd)
2005 (33rd)	Foster's Home for Imaginary Friends	"Duchess of Wails"	James L. Venable, Jennifer Kes Remington	Cartoon Network
2005 (33rd)	The Zula Patrol	"Case of the Missing Rings"	Jeff Danna, Steve Sullivan	PBS Kids/Smile
2005 (33rd)	The Batman	"The Laughing Bat"	Thomas Chase Jones	Kids' WB/Cartoon Network
2006 (34th)
2006 (34th)	Foster's Home for Imaginary Friends	"One False Movie"	James L. Venable, Jennifer Kes Remington	Cartoon Network
2006 (34th)	Shorty McShorts' Shorts	"Boyz on Da Run Part 1"	John King	Disney Channel
2006 (34th)	Squirrel Boy	"A Line in the Sandwich"	Brad Benedict, Mark Fontana, Erik Godal	Cartoon Network
2006 (34th)	Jakers! The Adventures of Piggley Winks	"The Gift"	Steve Marston	PBS Kids
2007 (35th)
2007 (35th)	The Simpsons	"Yokel Chords"	Alf Clausen, Michael Price	Fox
2007 (35th)	The Backyardigans	"International Super Spy"	Evan Lurie, Robert Scull, Steven Bernstein	Nickelodeon
2007 (35th)	El Tigre: The Adventures of Manny Rivera	"Yellow Pantera"	Shawn Patterson	Nickelodeon
2007 (35th)	Billy & Mandy's Big Boogey Adventure		Drew Neumann, Gregory Hinde	Cartoon Network
2007 (35th)	Foster's Home for Imaginary Friends	"The Bloo Superdude and the Magic Potato Power"	James L. Venable, Jennifer Kes Remington	Cartoon Network
2008 (36th)
2008 (36th)	Secrets of the Furious Five		Henry Jackman, Hans Zimmer, John Powell	NBC
2008 (36th)	Click and Clack's As the Wrench Turns		Carl Finch, Brave Combo	PBS
2008 (36th)	Star Wars: The Clone Wars	"Rising Malevolence"	Kevin Kiner	Cartoon Network
2008 (36th)	Back at the Barnyard	"Cowman: The Uddered Avenger"	Guy Moon	Nickelodeon
2008 (36th)	Growing Up Creepie	"Rockabye Freakie"	Guy Michelmore	Discovery Kids
2009 (37th)
2009 (37th)	The Fairly OddParents	"Wishology-The Big Beginning"	Guy Moon	Nickelodeon
2009 (37th)	Prep & Landing		Michael Giacchino	ABC
2009 (37th)	Star Wars: The Clone Wars	"Weapons Factory"	Kevin Kiner	Cartoon Network

=== 2010s ===
Year	Program	Episode(s)	Recipients(s)	Network/Studios
2010 (38th)
2010 (38th)	SpongeBob SquarePants		Jeremy Wakefield, Sage Guyton, Nick Carr, Tuck Tucker	Nickelodeon
2010 (38th)	The Simpsons	"Elementary School Musical"	Tim Long, Alf Clausen, Bret McKenzie, Jemaine Clement	Fox
2010 (38th)	Kung Fu Panda Holiday		Henry Jackman, Hans Zimmer, John Powell	NBC
2010 (38th)	Wonder Pets!		J. Walter Hawkes, Billy Lopez	Nickelodeon
2010 (38th)	Robot Chicken	"Robot Chicken's DP Christmas Special"	Shawn Patterson	Adult Swim
2011 (39th)
2011 (39th)	Prep & Landing: Naughty vs. Nice		Grace Potter, Michael Giacchino	ABC
2011 (39th)	The Penguins of Madagascar		Adam Berry, Bob Schooley, Mark McCorkle	Nickelodeon
2011 (39th)	The Amazing World of Gumball		Ben Locket	Cartoon Network
2011 (39th)	ThunderCats		Kevin Kliesch	Cartoon Network
2011 (39th)	Green Lantern: The Animated Series		Frederik Wiedmann	Cartoon Network
2011 (39th)	Pixie Hollow Games		Joel McNeely, Brendan Milburn, Valerie Vigoda	Disney Channel
2011 (39th)	Robot Chicken		Shawn Patterson, Zeb Wells	Adult Swim
2012 (40th)
2012 (40th)	Dragons: Riders of Berk	"How to Pick Your Dragon"	John Paesano	Cartoon Network
2012 (40th)	The Penguins of Madagascar	"Private and the Winky Factory"	Adam Berry	Nickelodeon
2012 (40th)	Bubble Guppies	"Bubble Puppy's Fintastic Fairytale!"	Michael Rubin, John Angier	Nickelodeon
2012 (40th)	T.U.F.F. Puppy	"Really Big Mission"	Guy Moon	Nickelodeon
2012 (40th)	The Simpsons	"Treehouse of Horror XXIII"	Alf Clausen	Fox
2012 (40th)	Green Lantern: The Animated Series	"Into the Abyss"	Frederik Wiedmann	Cartoon Network
2013 (41st)
2013 (41st)	Mickey Mouse		Christopher Willis	Disney Channel
2013 (41st)	T.U.F.F. Puppy		Guy Moon	Nickelodeon
2013 (41st)	Sofia the First		Kevin Kliesch, Craig Gerber, John Kavanaugh	Disney Channel
2013 (41st)	Wander Over Yonder		Andy Bean	Disney Channel
2013 (41st)	Estefan		Alan Williams	BYU Center for Animation
2013 (41st)	Peter Rabbit		Peter Luyre, Stuart Kollmorgen, Peter Zizzo	Nickelodeon/Nick Jr. Channel
2014 (42nd)
2014 (42nd)	Mickey Mouse		Christopher Willis	Disney Channel
2014 (42nd)	Dora and Friends: Into the City!		Peter Lurye, Chris Gifford, George Gabriel	Nickelodeon
2014 (42nd)	LEGO Ninjago: Masters of Spinjitzu		Jay Vincent, Michael Kramer, Jeppe Riddervold, Erin Chapman	Cartoon Network
2014 (42nd)	Avengers Assemble		Lolita Ritmanis, Kristopher Carter, Michael McCuistion	Disney XD
2014 (42nd)	Tumble Leaf		Nathan Barr, Lisbeth Scott	Prime Video
2015 (43rd)
2015 (43rd)	Mickey Mouse	"¡Feliz Cumpleaños!"	Christopher Willis	Disney Channel
2015 (43rd)	Elf: Buddy's Musical Christmas		Matthew Sklar, Christopher Guardino	NBC
2015 (43rd)	Puffin Rock	"Night Lights"	Einar Tonsberg	RTÉjr/Netflix
2015 (43rd)	Sanjay & Craig	"Street Dogg"	Nick Bachman, Neil Graf, Matt Mahaffey, Jonathan Hylander	Nickelodeon
2015 (43rd)	Sheriff Callie's Wild West	"The Good, the Bad & the Yo-Yo"	Mike Himelstein, Joe Ansolabehere, Mike Barnett, Mike Turner	Disney Junior
2015 (43rd)	The Venture Bros.	"All This and Gargantua-2"	JG Thirlwell	Adult Swim
2015 (43rd)	Wander Over Yonder	"The Black Cube"	Andy Bean	Disney XD
2016 (44th)
2016 (44th)	Pearl		Scot Stafford, Alexis Harte, JJ Wiesler	Google Spotlight Stories
2016 (44th)	Bob's Burgers	"Glued, Where's My Bob?"	Loren Bouchard, John Dylan Keith	Fox
2016 (44th)	Mickey Mouse	"Dancevidaniya"	Christopher Willis	Disney Channel
2016 (44th)	Star Wars Rebels	"Twilight of the Apprentice"	Kevin Kiner	Disney XD
2016 (44th)	Trollhunters: Tales of Arcadia	"Becoming, Part 1"	Alexandre Desplat, Tim Davies	Netflix
2017 (45th)
2017 (45th)	Mickey Mouse	"The Scariest Story Ever: A Mickey Mouse Halloween Spooktacular!"	Christopher Willis	Disney Channel
2017 (45th)	Home: Adventures with Tip & Oh	"Chercophonie"	Alex Geringas	Netflix
2017 (45th)	Lego Star Wars: The Freemaker Adventures	"Trouble on Tibalt"	Michael Kramer	Disney XD
2017 (45th)	The Powerpuff Girls	"Home, Sweet Homesick"	Mike Reagan, Bob Boyle	Cartoon Network
2017 (45th)	Tumble Leaf	"The Nature of Friendship / The Ship Shop"	Lisbeth Scott	Prime Video
2018 (46th)
2018 (46th)	Mickey Mouse	"Springtime"	Christopher Willis	Disney Channel
2018 (46th)	Back to the Moon		Mathieu Alvado	Google Spotlight Stories
2018 (46th)	The Tom and Jerry Show	"Kitten Grifters"	Vivek Maddala	Boomerang
2018 (46th)	Elena of Avalor	"Song of the Sirenas"	Tony Morales, John Kavanaugh, Craig Gerber, Silvia Olivas, Rachel Ruderman	Disney Channel
2018 (46th)	Tangled: The Series	"Secret of the Sun Drop"	Alan Menken, Glenn Slater, Kevin Kliesch	Disney Channel
2019 (47th)
2019 (47th)	Love, Death & Robots	"Sonnie's Edge"	Rob Cairns	Netflix
2019 (47th)	The Tom and Jerry Show	"Eagle Eye Jerry"	Vivek Maddala	Boomerang
2019 (47th)	Carmen Sandiego	"The Chasing Paper Caper"	Jared Lee Gosselin, Steve D'Angelo, Lorenzo Castelli	Netflix
2019 (47th)	Seis Manos	"The Empty Place"	Carl Thiel	Netflix
2019 (47th)	She-Ra and the Princesses of Power	"Beast Island"	Sunna Wehrmeijer	Netflix

=== 2020s ===
Year	Program	Episode(s)	Recipient(s)	Network
2020 (48th)
2020 (48th)	Star Wars: The Clone Wars	"Victory and Death"	Kevin Kiner	Disney+
2020 (48th)	Blood of Zeus	"Escape or Die"	Paul Edward-Francis	Netflix
2020 (48th)	Mira, Royal Detective	"The Great Diwali Mystery"	Amritha Vaz, Matthew Tishler, Jeannie Lurie	Disney Channel/Disney Junior
2020 (48th)	Star Trek: Lower Decks	"Crisis Point"	Chris Westlake	CBS All Access
2020 (48th)	The Tiger Who Came to Tea		David Arnold, Don Black	Channel 4
2021 (49th)
2021 (49th)	Maya and the Three	"The Sun and the Moon"	Tim Davies, Gustavo Santaolalla	Netflix
2021 (49th)	Blush		Joy Ngiaw	Apple TV+
2021 (49th)	Hilda and the Mountain King		Ryan Carlson	Netflix
2021 (49th)	Mila		Flavio Gargano	PepperMax Films
2021 (49th)	Mira, Royal Detective	"The Eid Mystery"	Amritha Vaz, Matthew Tishler, Jeannie Lurie	Disney Channel/Disney Junior
2022 (50th)
2022 (50th)	The Cuphead Show!	"Carn-Evil"	Ego Plum, Dave Wasson, Cosmo Segurson	Netflix
2022 (50th)	Love Death + Robots	"The Very Pulse of the Machine"	Rob Cairns	Netflix
2022 (50th)	Oni: Thunder God's Tale	"Onari's Kushi Power"	Zach Johnston, Matteo Roberts	Netflix
2022 (50th)	The House		Gustavo Santaolalla	Netflix
2022 (50th)	The Boy, the Mole, the Fox and the Horse		Isobel Waller-Bridge, Charlie Mackesy	Apple TV+
2023 (51st)
2023 (51st)	Star Wars: Visions	"Aau’s Song"	Markus Wormstorm, Nadia Darries, Dineo du Toit	Disney+
2023 (51st)	Animaniacs	"Talladega Mice"	Steven Bernstein and Julie Bernstein	Hulu
2023 (51st)	Babylon 5: The Road Home		Michael McCuistion, Kristopher Carter, Lolita Ritmanis	Warner Bros. Discovery Home Entertainment
2023 (51st)	Pacemaker		Christopher Lennertz	A Running Commentary
2023 (51st)	The Smeds and The Smoos		René Aubry	BBC One
2024 (52nd)	Arcane	"The Dirt Under Your Nail"	Ryan Jillian Santiago, Alexander Seaver, Simon Wilcox	Netflix
2024 (52nd)	Big City Green The Movie: Spacecation		Joachim Horsley	Disney Channel
2024 (52nd)	Hazbin Hotel	"Masquerade"	Sam Haft, Andrew Underberg	Amazon Prime Video
2024 (52nd)	Jentry Chau vs. the Underworld	"Lock in"	Brian H. Kim	Netflix
2024 (52nd)	WondLa	"Captive"	Joy Ngiaw	Apple TV+
2025 (53rd)	Win or Lose	"Mixed Signals"	Ramin Djawadi, Shane Eli, and Johnny Pakfar	Disney+
2025 (53rd)	Common Side Effects	"Lakeshore Limited"	Nicolas Snyder	Adult Swim
2025 (53rd)	Devil May Cry	"The First Circle"	Power Glove and Alex Seaver	Netflix
2025 (53rd)	Éiru		Leo Pearson and Ceara Conway	Cartoon Saloon
2025 (53rd)	Snoopy Presents: A Summer Musical		Ben Folds, Jeff Morrow, Alan Zachary, and Michael Weiner	Apple TV

== Composers with multiple wins and nominations ==
- Christopher Willis – 11 (5 wins)

== See also ==
- Primetime Emmy Award for Outstanding Music Composition for a Series
- Primetime Emmy Award for Outstanding Original Music and Lyrics
