= WondLa (TV series) =

American television series

- Promotional poster
- Genre: Science fiction; Fantasy; Comedy drama; Post-apocalyptic
- Based on: The Search for WondLa by Tony DiTerlizzi
- Developed by: Bobs Gannaway
- Showrunner: Bobs Gannaway
- Starring: Jeanine Mason; Teri Hatcher; Brad Garrett; Gary Anthony Williams; Chiké Okonkwo; D. C. Douglas; Alan Tudyk
- Composer: Joy Ngiaw
- Country of origin: United States
- Original language: English
- No. of seasons: 3
- No. of episodes: 20

Production
- Executive producers: Bobs Gannaway; Tony DiTerlizzi; Ellen Goldsmith-Vein; Jeremy Bell; Julie Kane-Ritsch; John Lasseter; David Ellison; Dana Goldberg
- Producer: Tony Cosanella
- Production companies: Skydance Animation; Gotham Group

Original release
- Network: Apple TV+
- Release: June 28, 2024 – April 25, 2025
- Network: Apple TV
- Release: November 26, 2025

WondLa, also known as The Search for WondLa, is an American animated sci-fi fantasy series based on the books The Search for WondLa, A Hero for WondLa, and The Battle for WondLa by Tony DiTerlizzi, produced by Skydance Animation and developed by Bobs Gannaway, who also serves as the showrunner and executive producer with DiTerlizzi, John Lasseter, David Ellison and Dana Goldberg. The cast includes the voices of Jeanine Mason, Teri Hatcher, Brad Garrett, Gary Anthony Williams, Chiké Okonkwo, D. C. Douglas, Ana Villafañe and Alan Tudyk.

The series premiered on Apple TV on June 28, 2024. A second season was released on April 25, 2025. A third and final season was released on November 26, 2025, comprising six episodes, one episode less than previous seasons.

== Premise ==
Eva, a curious, enthusiastic and spirited human teenager, is raised in a state-of-the-art bunker by M.U.T.H.R, a robot caretaker. On her 16th birthday, after an attack on Eva's bunker, she finds herself on the surface of a strange planet called Orbona, which is inhabited by aliens, covered with other-worldly fauna, and has no other humans to be found. Eva is joined by Otto, a giant tardigrade, and Rovender, a cantankerous alien, to help find humans, her home and her true destiny.

== Voice cast ==
- Jeanine Mason as Eva 9: Ninth generation orphan of sanctuary 573
  - Micaiah Chen as young Eva 9
- Teri Hatcher as Muthr: Robot caretaker of sanctuary 573
- Brad Garrett as Otto: A giant waterbear and Eva's friend
- Gary Anthony Williams as
  - Rovender Kitt: A cantankerous alien and Eva's adoptive father
  - Roshon: Ninth generation orphan of sanctuary 573 (S1)
- Chiké Okonkwo as Besteel: Renowned and evil alien hunter of Orbona (S1) and Redimus Besteel's Brother (S3)
- D. C. Douglas as Omnipod: A sentient digital device used for intel
- Alan Tudyk as Cadmus Pryde: Founder of Dynastes Corporation
- Christopher Swindle as Meego: A soft, plushy toy given to all children
- John Ratzenberger as Caruncle: A junk and human artifacts collector (S1)
- Sayed Badreya as a bartender in the city of Lacus (S1)
- Michael Wrona as a race announcer (S1)
- Vernee Watson-Johnson as Ol' Crusty: A lazy otter in Lacus (S1)
- Larissa Gallagher as Hostia: Wife of Fiscian, friend of Rovender (S1)
- T. J. Power as Fiscian: Husband of Hostia, friend of Rovender (S1)
- Louella Edith Power as Zoozi: Daughter of Hostia and Fiscian (S1)
- Everly Carganilla as Maegden: Son of Hostia and Fiscian (S1)
- Kingslei Michelle Love as a baby sandsniper
- Shohreh Aghdashloo as Darius: Advisor of Queen Ojo (S1)
- Maz Jobrani as Zin: Advisor of Queen Ojo (S1)
- Navid Negahban as Loroc (S1)
- Sarah Hollis as Queen Ojo: Queen of Arbona (S1)
- Kari Wahlgren as Dewey (S1)
- Simon Pegg as Bob (S1) (Note: Archive audio from Luck)
- Ana Villafańe as Eight aka Eva 8: Eighth generation orphan of sanctuary 573, Eva's lookalike and adoptive sister (S2)
- John Harlan Kim as Hailey: Pilot at Dynastes (S2)
- Raoul Mac Trujillo as Xander: Friend of Eight (S2)
- Sonya Lesie as Violet: Friend of Eight (S2)
- Rick Zieff as Kai: Friend of Eight (S2)
- Dwight Schultz as Vanpa aka Evan 4: Pilot at Dysnastes (S2)

== Episodes ==
=== Series overview ===
Season	Episodes	Originally released	Network
1	7	June 28, 2024	Apple TV+
2	7	April 25, 2025	Apple TV+
3	6	November 26, 2025	Apple TV

=== Season 1 (2024) ===
No. overall	No. in season	Title	Directed by	Written by	Original release date
1	1	"Chapter 1: Doors"	Andrew L. Schmidt and Micah Gunnell	Bobs Gannaway	June 28, 2024
Eva Nine, a curious and intelligent teenage girl, has spent her entire life underground, raised by a robot caretaker named Muthr (Multi Utility Task Help Robot 06) in a high-tech sanctuary, Sanctuary 573. One night, Eva sneaks through a mysterious door in the restricted area, emerging into a strange and unfamiliar surface world filled with bizarre creatures and unknown dangers and a strange note titled WondLa. She finds someone to help her, but it's actually an unknown intruder that attacks the Sanctuary. Eva and Muthr are forced to escape but something captures Muthr. Eva is separated from her, emerges onto the surface and finds herself on the alien planet Orbona.
2	2	"Chapter 2: Lifeforms"	Andrew L. Schmidt	Lauren Bradley and Bobs Gannaway	June 28, 2024
Eva explores new environments and encounters various alien lifeforms on planet Orbona. There, she met a gruff alien called Rovender Kitt who offers a potential link to other humans. Suddenly, the unknown intruder arrives and Eva and Rovender manage to escape but it captures these two. The unknown intruder was an evil alien hunter named Besteel. Eva rescues herself and a telepathic water‑bear creature named Otto, who was captured by Besteel as well. Eva frees Rovender and carries an unconscious Muthr to Besteel's spaceship to escape but Besteel stops them, attempting to terminate them. Unfortunately, Besteel's ship crash landed onto him and Eva and Rovender rode on Otto, making their exit.
3	3	"Chapter 3: Bargain"	Lawrence Gong	Kyle McVey and Bobs Gannaway	June 28, 2024
Eva, Muthr, Otto and Rovender travel to the fishing village of Lacus on the planet Orbona. They’re trying to locate information about other humans. With Rovender’s help, Eva meets a crafty merchant who deals in human‑artifacts. To gain the merchant’s cooperation and the lead she needs, Eva stakes everything in a risky bet at the local Spiderfish Races.
4	4	"Chapter 4: Ghosts"	Lawrence Gong	Grace Davis	June 28, 2024
Eva seeks out the archaic Arsian sage called Darius, hoping to uncover more about humanity’s fate and her own mission. Darius reveals a grim truth about what happened to humans. Undeterred, Eva resolves to push forward in her quest to find other humans. Meanwhile, the alien bounty hunter Besteel tightens the net, closing in on Eva’s trail.
5	5	"Chapter 5: Captive"	Philip Pignotti	Mario Carvalhal and Bobs Gannaway	June 28, 2024
Eva pushes ahead with a bold plan despite Muthr’s objections. Along the way she unexpectedly befriends the Queen of Arbona named Ojo, who never thought she would trust; forming an alliance that could shift the balance of her journey. Queen Ojo shows Eva a golden car called the Goldfish. Eva was captured by Queen Ojo's advisor Zin but she met one of the Sandsnipers who set her free. Queen Ojo ignores his brother Lorocs' orders and lets Eva go.
6	6	"Chapter 6: Bridge"	Phillip Pignotti	Adam Galen	June 28, 2024
Eva drives the Goldfish to see Muthr and Otto once again. They went to the abandoned bridge and saw Rovender going there too. Eva, Muthr, Rovender and Otto spent their time crossing this bridge. Otto wants to ride on the Goldfish too, but he's too big, causing the Goldfish to crash land. Eva, Muthr, Otto, Rovender leave the Goldfish and climb on one of the bridge's tops. Eva, Muthr and Rovender rode on Otto who could fly. The four finally found themselves in the abandoned city.
7	7	"Chapter 7: Ruins"	Lawrence Gong	Christian Magalhaes and Bob Snow	June 28, 2024
In the abandoned city, where the humans have vanished, Eva, Muthr, Otto and Rovender found the last one who is already dead. Besteel finds the four and a battle begins. Towards the end of the battle, Besteel attempts to eliminate Eva but Muthr rescues her, but sacrifices herself. Finally, Eva calls for help in her head and the Sandsnipers kill Besteel by dragging him to death beneath the cracked road. Eva mourns to Muthr's death and she, Otto and Rovender had a big funeral for her. Suddenly, a spaceship swoops down from the sky, who appears to be a human boy named Hailey Turner who informs Eva that he is there to take her home.

=== Season 2 (2025) ===
No. overall	No. in season	Title	Directed by	Written by	Original release date
8	1	"Chapter 8: Home"	Phillip Pignotti	Mario Carvalhal and Christian Magalhaes and Bob Snow	April 25, 2025
Hailey Turner and Van Turner arrive in a spaceship to rescue Eva (Eva from Sactuary 573). Eva, Otto and Rovender fly on the spaceship to New Attica, a place for Human Civilization. After Otto and Rovender leave, Eva meets a man named Cadmus Pryde. Eva and Cadmus Pryde's daughters explore New Attica. Eva gets a new outfit, has some food and plays a video game. Eva meets another Multi Utility Task Helper Robot (Muthr 248). Eva sees someone looking exactly like her outside her sleeping unit. Muthr 248 calls Eva as Eva Nine.
9	2	"Chapter 9: Family"	Carlos Baena	Che Grayson	April 25, 2025
Cadmus Pryde asks Eva Nine to meet New Attica's scientists to share her experience outside New Attica. Muthr 248 shows Eva Nine the way to meet Cadmus Pryde but Eva Nine starts to follow the person who looks exactly like her instead. Eva Nine jumps into a waterfall which goes below the surface and reaches a sanctuary. Eva Nine meets Eva Eight who was also raised in Sanctuaty 573. Eva Eight shares her story to Eva Nine. Eva Nine meets other sanctuary born people, Viloet (Sanctuary 475), Xander (Sanctuary 342) and Kai (Sanctuary 256). The group shares a meal. Muthr 248 finds the location. Eva Eight and Eva Nine meet Cadmus Pryde. Otto communicates with Eva Eight telepathically and informs her that Otto and Rovender are trapped.
10	3	"Chapter 10: Discovery"	Lawrence Gong	James Strzelinski	April 25, 2025
Eva Nine tells Eva Eight about her friends. Eva Eight gets a map for the underground tunnels from Violet. Otto and Rovender are held captive inside Cadmus Pyrde's lab. Cadmus Pryde informs the board members about the lack of food and plans to use Eva Nine to reach the power source of Orbona. Eva Nine rescues her friends. Eva Eight and Violet help Eva Nine and her friends to get out of the underground tunnels. Van Turner stays behind to open the hatch door for the spaceship to let Eva Nine, Eva Eight, Hailey Turner, Otto and Rovender escape New Attica. A robot looking like a spider chases the spaceship.
11	4	"Chapter 11: Lesson"	Philip Pignotti	Mario Carvalhal	April 25, 2025
The Spider Robot crashes into a flying whale and the spaceship crash lands on wastelands. The group hides from the spider robot behind a moving tree. The group encounters a group of Mirthians and Eva Nine convinces the Mirthians to show her the way to escape the wastelands. The Mirthians warn Eva Nine about Dovasu, a dangerous butterfly like creature with a scorpion tail. The group travels through a sand storm and hide inside a cave. Rovender decides to sacrifice himself to the creature as he is sick and dying but Eva Nine stops Rovender. The creature tricks Eva Nine but Eva Eight kills the creature. The group reaches a green spot, Farnus.
12	5	"Chapter 12: Truth"	Rhea Dadoo	Che Grayson	April 25, 2025
Farnus is the home of Cærulean (Rovender Kitt's people). The Cærulean rejects entry to the group claiming that there is no place for Rovender in Farnus as he is a deserter. Eva Eight and Hailey Turner go to look for fireword. Eva Nine takes Rovender into farnus to find medicine for his sickness. Eva Nine's group is captured. Rovender's father, Antiquus is the leader of Cærulean. Eva Nine agrees to a trial of truth to save Rovender. To begin the trial, Eva Nine has to find the bird of revelation, Kawona. Eva Nine flies on a flying whale and finds the Kawona with the help of another Cærulean. After the trial of truth, Antiquus orders to save his son, Rovender.
13	6	"Chapter 13: Connection"	Lawrence Gong	James Strzelinski	April 25, 2025
At Farnus, the Cæruleans celebrate Joyous Bloom festival around the heart of the forest. The group joins the celebration except Eva Eight who leaves farnus to meet her friends. During the celebration, the heart of the forest communicates with Eva Nine and she sees a vision of the creation of Orbona. Spider Robots attack farnus and the Cæruleans evacuate. Eva Nine, Hailey Turner and Otto distract the spider robots to give the Cæruleans time to evacuate. Rovender and another Cærulean help the group to escape the spider robots. Hailey Turner is revealed to have betrayed the group by giving the location of Farnus to Cadmus Pryde. Cadmus Pryde arrives and takes Eva Eight and Eva Nine with him but leaves Hailey in the forest.
14	7	"Chapter 14: Heart"	Philip Pignotti	Christian Magalhaes and Bob Snow	April 25, 2025
Cadmus Pryde uses Eva Nine to locate the heart of the forest (Source of Orbona). Eva Nine uses telepathy to ask for help from the nearby birds and wandering trees. The wandering trees knock down Cadmus Pryde's spaceship. Eva Nine is injured during the crash. Eva Nine finds the source attached to a MUTHR unit inside sanctuary 118. Eva Eight knocks Cadmus Pryde unconscious. The source connects with Eva Nine, apparently killing her. Eva Eight removes the source from its resting place, resulting in all of Orbona drying up. Soon after, Eva Eight is captured by Cadmus Pryde.

=== Season 3 (2025) ===
No. overall	No. in season	Title	Directed by	Written by	Original release date
15	1	"Chapter 15: Rise"	Rhea Dadoo	Grace Davis	November 26, 2025
Eva Eight argues with Cadmus aboard his ship following the events with Eva Nine. She tells him that he will reveal to everyone what has happened with Eva Nine and how he has been hiding the truth from New Attica. This causes Cadmus to drop her from his ship, but she finds her way back to New Attica. She sneaks in and destroys one of the robotic keepers, giving her and her allies insight into New Attica's systems. They use this to lure Cadmus into a trap, but it turns out he was using a hologram and Eva Eight is captured. He argues with her and tells her that she had killed Eva Nine when she removed the Source. He convinces her then to join him. He gathers residents of New Attica and presents Eva Eight as one of the members of a group who has destroyed their crops, causing rationing (instead of revealing those are failing). When it is time for Eva Eight to speak, instead of following Cadmus' pre-prepared speech, she reveals the truth of illusions in New Attica and about outside world. She encourages people to go out and claim the Earth that belongs to them. She also imprisons Cadmus, who argues that they cannot go out as aliens are connected to the Source and they do not understand it yet. Eva Eight responds that she will harness the power of the Source and destroy all aliens. Meanwhile, nature is shown to have deteriorated since the Source's removal. However, in the last scene Eva Nine is shown opening her eyes.
16	2	"Chapter 16: Return"	Lawrence Gong	Mario Carvalhal	November 26, 2025
Eva Nine awakens, having gained white hair after linking to the Source, and sees the decaying environment. She helps some local creatures and encounters Arius, who has the ability to see possible futures and convinces Eva that there is still a chance and to go to Queen Ojo. Eva heads out, and sees smoke in the distance that turns out to be Rovender's campfire that he set up while looking for Eva. Together they go back to try and see Ojo but it turn out to be difficult as there are rising concerns after attack on Faunas. With a help from Gargoof they manage to sneak in (with Gergoof and Eva under one coat) and try to convince the Queen that humans did not have bad intentions and Cadmus is at fault, while others are good. Eva also reveals her identity and the Queen is convinced, but Loroc uses this to accuse the Queen of being a traitor and usurps power. Eva Nine, Ojo, Rovender and Gargoof are imprisoned but manage to escape, also with the help of Redimus (Besteel's brother loyal to the Queen) and Chip. Advisor Zin also tells them that the Heart needs to go into the centre of the Earth, warning them that it needs to stay in the casing and not be touched. They leave and manage to hide and later on watch as Loroc orders a march of the forces towards humans, as he plans to eliminate them all and take the Heart for himself.
17	3	"Chapter 17: Mission"	Philip Pignotti	James Strzelinski and Christian Magalhaes and Bob Snow	November 26, 2025
Eva Nine and the group (Queen Ojo, Rovender, Azura and Redimus) are rushing to get to New Attica before Loroc and his forces do, retrieve the Heart, and place it into thermal vents there so it can reach centre of the planet and save it. On the way they encounter Vanpa and Otto. Vanpa reveals he has a signal for location of the ship - in nearby Lacus - that could enable them to get to New Attica faster. As they get to Lacus, they see that Caruncle has become a Viceroy and is exploiting the population by taking away their supplies. Eva and Radmus (who is distrustful of Eva) go to question Caruncle about ship's location, while others hid. However, Caruncle uses information about how Eva killed Besteel to create a distraction and escape. Redimus is captured, while Eva manages to get away and find her group and they hide together at Hestia's home. There they learn where the ship is and are smuggled to it past the guards in a crate as fish supplies. In the ship they find Hailey hiding, but also learn there is missing component preventing the ship from flying. Caruncle reveals himself, and that he as the component, and orders guards to arrest them. The skirmish ensues, in which Eva goes to free Redimus, while others fight off the guards and repair the ship. Most of the group manages to get on the ship and get it into the air but are hooked to the dock and cannot leace. Queen Ojo then speaks to the citizens and convinces them to fight off the oppression and they all band together to help the group deal with the guards and free the ship. The Queen also decides to stay and help the people recover afterwards, while allowing Redimus to join Eva and the rest of the group as they fly off towards New Attica.
18	4	"Chapter 18: Monsters"	Rhea Dadoo	Che Grayson and Grace Davis	November 26, 2025
The group continues in a ship towards New Attica and sees numerous creatures migrating in a same direction, drawn there by the Heart. The ship crashes before they reach the destination, but close enough to Trievertown that they can pick up communication signals. Eva Nine hears Eva Eight through these, and rushes to meet her. They are reunited at the town's entrance and Eva Nine rushes to tell Eva Eight many of the things that have happened and how they need to get to Cadmus to retrieve the Heart. However, once inside, Eva Nine is sent for "deprogramming" as she is "sick" and "infected by the aliens". Eva Nine also sees how the humans here have become militarized and tech weaponized. She is saved by Vanpa's allies and learns Eva Eight has Cadmus in a cell and has taken the Heart too. She escapes and tries to reason with Eva Eight and warn her of Loroc's approaching army. Hoever, Eva Eight says "army" is already here and points to groups of approaching alien animals that are heading close to the Heart. Eva Nine tries to explain these are just innocent animals, but Eva Eight won't hear it and shoots and kills one of the giant flying creatures despite Eva Nine's pleas to leave it alone and that it is a mother with small babies. Eva Nine is devastated by the creatures death and yells at Eva Eight how she could do this. Eva Eight says those are monsters, and Nine responds that she - Eva Eight - is the monster. Eva Nine also establishes a connection with all the creatures and warns them to go back, so they turn away. Eva Eight tells her people that "Project Sunshine" is a go, as she and Eva Nine go in separate directions. Eva Nine and the group try to think of the new ways to get to the Heart, and Otto needs to leave as his family, that was also migrating there towards the Heart with others, is scared and has to turn away.
19	5	"Chapter 19: Lost"	Carlos Baena	Christian Magalhaes and Bob Snow and James Strzelinski	November 26, 2025
Loroc's forces have arrived and begin fighting the humans. Meanwhile, Eva Nina and the group use one of the damaged human machines to make their way into New Attica and follow one of the remaining small flying creatures to the Heart/Source. Outside, human forces are losing and Eva Eight orders the evacuation. Eva Nina and others encounter Violet and other humans who attempt to stop them, but pillar guards break into New Attica and Violet and others decide to help instead after being saved by Redimus. Eva Nine makes her way towards the Heart and encounters Cadmus who tells her that Eva Eight has made him weaponize the Heart and has intended to draw the aliens into New Attica as she plans to detonate it and kill all aliens there. He also gives Eva Nine the original omni that has universal access, and also contains all human history. She reaches the Heart and uses the omni to remove the weaponised casing, however most of the structure is falling apart. Otto reappears with his family and saves her from the falling debris. She, Otto and Rovender continue towards thermal vents with the Heart as others stay to help injured humans. In the end, Loroc enters New Attica.
20	6	"Chapter 20: WondLa"	Carlos Baena	Christian Magalhaes and Bob Snow	November 26, 2025
Eva, Rovender and Otto rush with the Heart to the vent, pursued by Loroc, while the others continue to fight pillar guards and protect the civilians. Loroc manages to get the Heart from them, and Eva and Rovender chase him onto his flying machine. Eva eventually tricks him into touching the Heart directly (as they were warned against) and he dies. Eva uses the flying machine toget into the tunnel leading to the vent but is trapped by the debris. Number of alien creatures appear and free her, and then follow her towards the vent. Meanwhile, Hailey joins with other Vanpa's friends to help the evacuation in New Attica. Eva and the creatures make it to the vent, only to be stopped by Eva Eight who threatens them with a weapon. Eva Nine and creatures move forward and Eva Eight shoots Rovender (who also made it there) as he is trying to get Juguma to her so she can understand them too. Eva Nine is devastated as Rovender's life slips away, and he pleads with her not to let this change her. Eva Eight is also shaken by what has happened but still holds a weapon to Eva Nine. Eva Nine approaches and connects with Eva Eight, seeing her in vulenrable state when she was young and returned to her sanctuary after all others were lost and the world was not as expected. Eva Eight tells Eva Nina that she waited for her but she chose "them". Eva Nine responds that there is no "them" but "only us" and proceeds to the vent with the Heart intending to go down with her. Eva Eight stops her, and grabs the Heart herself, claiming that Orbona needs Eva Nine. Both Eva Eight and the Heart drop into the vent, restoring Orbona's environment. Some time later, Queen Ojo is shown honoring Eva Nine and humans have begun living among aliens.

== Production ==
=== Development ===
In February 2021, it was announced that Apple, in partnership with Skydance Animation, was creating a television adaptation of The Search for WondLa to stream on Apple TV (formerly Apple TV+). It was originally set to be written and executive produced by showrunner Lauren Montgomery with Chad Quant, Tony DiTerlizzi and Skydance Animation head John Lasseter attached as executive producers. In August 2022, it was announced that the series was given a two-season order as Montgomery left the project and was replaced by Bobs Gannaway, who previously co-directed and co-wrote Secret of the Wings (2012) and directed and co-wrote Planes: Fire & Rescue (2014) under Lasseter's leadership at Disneytoon Studios. On April 30, 2024, Apple and Skydance announced the cast and the premiere of the series to be set on June 28 with seven episodes of the first season releasing on Apple TV.

=== Animation ===
Animation provided for the series is made by ICON Creative Studio in Vancouver, British Columbia, Canada.

=== Music ===
Joy Ngiaw, composer of Skydance Animation's short film Blush, was announced to compose the score for the series in January 2024. The Season 1 soundtrack was released by Milan Records on June 28, 2024. The score for Season 1 was nominated for an Annie Award.

== Release ==
The series premiered on June 28, 2024 on Apple TV.
