= Waller-Bridge =

Waller-Bridge is an English double-barrelled surname. It may refer to:

- Isobel Waller-Bridge (born 1984), English composer
- Phoebe Waller-Bridge (born 1985), English actress, producer, and writer
