= 50th Annie Awards =

US media awards ceremony held in 2023

- Date: February 25, 2023
- Site: Royce Hall; Los Angeles, California, U.S.
- Organized by: ASIFA-Hollywood

Highlights
- Best Animated Feature: Guillermo del Toro's Pinocchio
- Best Direction: Guillermo del Toro and Mark Gustafson; Guillermo del Toro's Pinocchio
- Most awards: Guillermo del Toro's Pinocchio (5)
- Most nominations: Guillermo del Toro's Pinocchio (9)

The 50th ceremony of the Annie Awards, honoring excellence in the field of animation for the year of 2022, was held on February 25, 2023, at the University of California, Los Angeles's Royce Hall in Los Angeles, California, in a live ceremony after two years as a virtual event.

The nominees were announced on January 17, 2023, Guillermo del Toro's Pinocchio led the nominations with nine, followed by Turning Red with seven.

== Winners and nominees ==
=== Productions Categories ===
Best Animated Feature	Best Animated Feature — Independent
Guillermo del Toro's Pinocchio – Netflix presents a Double Dare You! Film / a ShadowMachine production in association with The Jim Henson Company; Puss in Boots: The Last Wish – DreamWorks Animation; The Sea Beast – Netflix; Turning Red – Pixar Animation Studios; Wendell & Wild – Netflix presents a Monkeypaw production / a Gotham Group production	Marcel the Shell with Shoes On – Marcel the Movie LLC, A24; Charlotte – January Films, Ltd., Balthazar Productions, and Walking the Dog; Inu-Oh – Science SARU; Little Nicholas: Happy As Can Be – On Classics (Mediawan) / Bidibul Productions; My Father's Dragon – Cartoon Saloon, Netflix
Best Animated Special Production	Best Animated Short Subject
The Boy, the Mole, the Fox and the Horse – NoneMore Productions and Bad Robot Productions; The House – Nexus Studios for Netflix; Prehistoric Planet – BBC Studios in association with Apple; The Sandman – A Netflix Original Series / a Warner Bros. Television Production; Superworm – Magic Light Pictures	Ice Merchants – COLA Animation production & Wild Stream; Amok – Boddah; Black Slide – The Hive Studio, in co-production with FlipBook Studio; The Flying Sailor – National Film Board of Canada; Love, Dad – 13ka, in co-production with FAMU & nutprodukcia
Best Sponsored Production	Best Animated Television/Broadcast Production for Preschool Children
Save Ralph – Arch Model Studio; "Can't Negotiate the Melting Point of Ice" – NOMINT; Minions: The Rise of Gru / The Office – Illumination; Ted Lasso: The Missing Christmas Mustache – Apple presents a Doozer production in association with Warner Bros. Television and Universal Television; "Today's Holiday Moments are Tomorrow's Memories" – Hornet	The Tiny Chef Show: "Pancakes" – Tiny Chef Productions LLC, Imagine Entertainment; Elinor Wonders Why: "Rest is Best" – SHOE Ink. LLC; Gabby's Dollhouse: "Cakey's Cupcake Cousins" – DreamWorks Animation; Rise Up, Sing Out: "Name Tag" – Disney TV Animation; Spirit Rangers: "Thunder Mountain" – Laughing Wild, Netflix
Best Animated Television/Broadcast Production for Children	Best Mature Audience Animated Television/Broadcast Production
Abominable and the Invisible City: "Everest Returns" – DreamWorks Animation; Big Nate: "The Legend of the Gunting" – Nickelodeon Animation; Moominvalley: "Lonely Mountain" – Gutsy Animations; The Owl House: "King's Tide" – Disney TV Animation; We Baby Bears: "The Real Crayon" – Cartoon Network Studios	Bob's Burgers: "Some Like it Bot Part 1: Eighth Grade Runner" – 20th Television, Bento Box Entertainment; Harley Quinn: "Batman Begins Forever" – Warner Bros. Animation; Rick and Morty: "Night Family" – Rick and Morty LLC; The Simpsons: "Treehouse of Horror XXXIII" – A Gracie Films production in association with 20th Television Animation; Tuca & Bertie: "The Pain Garden" – The Tornante Company
Best Animated Limited Series	Best Student Film
Oni: Thunder God's Tale: "The Demon Moon Rises" – A Netflix Series / A Tonko House Production; Baymax!: "Sofia" – Walt Disney Animation Studios; El Deafo: "Everybody Sounds So Weird" – Lighthouse Studios in association with Apple; HouseBroken: "Who's Having a Merry Trashmas?" – Kapital Entertainment, FOX Entertainment; Undone: "Rectify" – The Tornante Company, Amazon Studios	The Soloists – Mehrnaz Abdollahinia, Feben Elias Woldehawariat, Razahk Issaka, Celeste Jamneck & Yi Liu, director (Gobelins, l'école de l'image); Au revoir Jérôme ! – Adam Sillard, Gabrielle Selnet & Chloé Farr, directors (Gobelins, l'école de l'image); Birdsong – Michelle Cheng, director and producer (California Institute of the Arts); Synchronie Passagère – Julia Le Bras-Juarez, director (Supinfocom Rubika); The Most Boring Granny in the Whole World – Damaris Zielke, director; Jiayan Chen, producer (Film Academy Baden-Württemberg)

=== Individual achievement categories ===
Outstanding Achievement for Animated Effects in an Animated Television/Broadcast Production	Outstanding Achievement for Animated Effects in an Animated Production
Love Death + Robots: "Bad Traveling" – Kirby Miller, Igor Zanic, Joseph H. Coleman, Steven Dupuy, Josh Schwartz; The Boy, the Mole, the Fox and the Horse – Peter Baynton, Raymond Pang, Martial Coulon; Cars on the Road: "Road Rumblers" – Christopher Foreman, Elana Lederman, John Lockwood, Jae Jun Yi, Justin Ritter; The House – Germán Díez, Álvaro Alonso Lomba, Hugo Vieites Caamaño; Prehistoric Planet: "Coasts"	Avatar: The Way of Water – Johnathan M. Nixon, David Moraton, Nicholas Illingworth, David Caeiro Cebrian, Alex Nowotny; Guillermo del Toro's Pinocchio – Aaron Weintraub, Warren Lawtey, Alireza Malmiri, Baptiste Malbranque, Mikhail Donchenko; Lightyear – Carl Kaphan, Cody Harrington, Hope Schroers, Jon Barry, Nate Skeen; Minions: The Rise of Gru – Frank Baradat, Simon Pate, Milan Voukassovitch, Milo Riccarand; The Sea Beast – Spencer Lueders, Dmitriy Kolesnik, Kiel Gnebba, Oleksandr (Alex) Loboda, Jeremy Hoey
Outstanding Achievement for Character Animation in an Animated Television / Broadcast Production	Outstanding Achievement for Character Animation in an Animated Feature Production
The Boy, the Mole, the Fox and the Horse – Tim Watts; Entergalactic – Aziz Kocanaogullari; The House – Kecy Salangad; Oni: Thunder God's Tale: "The Mighty Storm Gods" – Toshihiro Nakamura; StoryBots: Answer Time: "Taste" – Henrique Baron	Guillermo del Toro's Pinocchio – Tucker Barrie; The Bad Guys – Jorge Capote; The Bad Guys – Min Hong; Turning Red – Teresa Falcone; Turning Red – Eric Anderson
Outstanding Achievement for Character Animation in a Live Action Production	Outstanding Achievement for Character Animation in a Video Game
Avatar: The Way of Water – Daniel Barrett, Stuart Adcock, Todd Labonte, Douglas McHale, Stephen Cullingford; Beast – Alvise Avati, Chris McGaw, Bora Şahin, Krzysztof Boyoko, Laurent Benhamo; Finch – Simon Allen, Harinarayan Rajeev, Paul Nelson, Matthias Schoenegger; Jurassic World Dominion – Jance Rubinchik, Alexander Lee, Rich Bentley, Antoine Verney Carron, Sally Wilson; Peacemaker – Michael Cozens, Mark Smith, Kai-Hua Lan, Selene McLean, Richard John Moore	Cuphead: The Delicious Last Course – Chad Moldenhauer, Hanna Abi-Hanna; God of War Ragnarök – Santa Monica Studio team; Horizon Forbidden West – Richard Oud, Jan-Erik Sjovall, Guerrilla Animation Team; Moss: Book II – Richard Lico; Potionomics – Emily Lattanavong, Anguel Bogoev
Outstanding Achievement for Character Design in an Animated Television / Broadcast Production	Outstanding Achievement for Character Design in an Animated Feature Production
Love Death + Robots: "Jibaro" – Alberto Mielgo; Amphibia: "The Hardest Thing" – Joe Sparrow; Entergalactic – Meybis Ruiz Cruz; Oni: Thunder God's Tale: "The Demon Moon Rises" – Rebecca Chan; Spirit Rangers: "Belly of the Beast" – Marie Delmas	The Bad Guys – Taylor Krahenbuhl; Luck – Massimiliano Narciso; Puss in Boots: The Last Wish – Jesús Alonso Iglesias; Rise of the Teenage Mutant Ninja Turtles: The Movie – Ida Hem; Wendell & Wild – Pablo Lobato
Outstanding Achievement for Directing in an Animated Television / Broadcast Production	Outstanding Achievement for Directing in an Animated Feature Production
The Boy, the Mole, the Fox and the Horse – Peter Baynton, Charlie Mackesy; Baymax!: "Sofia" – Lissa Treiman; e∞ception: "Misprint" – Yûzô Satô; More Than I Want to Remember – Amy Bench, Maya Edelman; Oni: Thunder God's Tale: "The Demon Moon Rises" – Daisuke "Dice" Tsutsumi	Guillermo del Toro's Pinocchio – Guillermo del Toro, Mark Gustafson; Marcel the Shell with Shoes On – Dean Fleischer Camp, Kirsten Lepore, Stephen Chiodo; My Father's Dragon – Nora Twomey; Turning Red – Domee Shi; Wendell & Wild – Henry Selick
Outstanding Achievement for Editorial in an Animated Television / Broadcast Production	Outstanding Achievement for Editorial in an Animated Feature Production
The Boy, the Mole, the Fox and the Horse – Daniel Budin; Amphibia: "All In" – Andrew Sorcini, Yoonah Yim, Jennifer Calbi, Julie Anne Lau, David Vasquez; Green Eggs and Ham: "The Sam Who Came In From the Cold" – Margaret Hou; Karma's World: "Keys, The Inventor" – Damien Dunne, Ultan Murphy, Emma O'Brien, Fred O'Connor, Aiden McKenna; Star Trek: Lower Decks: "The Least Dangerous Game" – Andy Maxwell, Zach Lamplugh, Caleb Yoder, Paul Mazzotta	Puss in Boots: The Last Wish – James Ryan, Jacquelyn Karambelas, Natalla Cronembold, Joe Butler, Katie Parody; Guillermo del Toro's Pinocchio – Ken Schretzmann, Holly Klein, Emily Chiu, Hamilton Barrett; Lightyear – Tony Greenberg, Katie Bishop, Chloe Kloezeman, Axel Geddes, Tim Fox; The Sea Beast – Joyce Arrastica, Will Erokan, Vivek Sharma, Michael Hugh O'Donnell, Daniel Ortiz; Turning Red – Nicholas Smith, Steve Bloom, David Suther, Anna Wolitzky, Christopher Zuber
Outstanding Achievement for Music in an Animated Television / Broadcast Production	Outstanding Achievement for Music in an Animated Feature Production
The Cuphead Show!: "Carn-Evil" – Ego Plum, Dave Wasson, Cosmo Segurson; The Boy, the Mole, the Fox and the Horse – Isobel Waller-Bridge, Charlie Mackesy; The House – Gustavo Santaolalla; Love Death + Robots: "The Very Pulse of the Machine" – Rob Cairns; Oni: Thunder God's Tale: "Onari's Kushi Power" – Zach Johnston, Matteo Roberts	Guillermo del Toro's Pinocchio – Alexandre Desplat, Roeban Katz, Guillermo del Toro, Patrick McHale; The Bad Guys – Daniel Pemberton; Mad God – Dan Wool; The Sea Beast – Mark Mancina, Nell Benjamin, Laurence O'Keefe; Turning Red – Ludwig Göransson, Billie Eilish, Finneas O'Connell
Outstanding Achievement for Production Design in an Animated Television / Broadcast Production	Outstanding Achievement for Production Design in an Animated Feature Production
Oni: Thunder God's Tale: "The Demon Moon Rises" – Robert Kondo, Rachel Tiep-Daniels, Lia Tin, Yohei Hashizume, Masa Inada; The Boy, the Mole, the Fox and the Horse – Mike McCain; Genndy Tartakovsky's Primal: "Echoes of Eternity" – Scott Wills; The House – Niklas Nilsson, Alexandra Walker; Mall Stories – Atilla the Grilla – Jasmin Lai, Lauren Zurcher, Junyi Wu	Guillermo del Toro's Pinocchio – Curt Enderle, Guy Davis; The Bad Guys – Luc Desmarchelier, Floriane Marchix; Mad God – Phil Tippett; Puss in Boots: The Last Wish – Nate Wragg, Joseph Feinsilver, Claire Keane, Wayne Tsay, Naveen Selvanathan; The Sea Beast – Matthias Lechner, Jung Woonyoung
Outstanding Achievement for Storyboarding in an Animated Television / Broadcast Production	Outstanding Achievement for Storyboarding in an Animated Feature Production
Love Death + Robots: "The Very Pulse of the Machine" – Emily Dean; The Cuphead Show!: "A Very Devil Christmas" – Karl Hadrika; Cyberpunk: Edgerunners: "Let You Down" – Kaneko Yoshiyuk; Kung Fu Panda: The Dragon Knight: "The Knight's Code" – Grace Liu; Looney Tunes Cartoons: "Hex Appeal" – Mike Ruocco	Puss in Boots: The Last Wish – Anthony Holden; Minions: The Rise of Gru – Nima Azarba; Minions: The Rise of Gru – Dave Feiss; Strange World – Jeff Snow; Strange World – Javier Ledesma Barboll
Outstanding Achievement for Voice Acting in an Animated Television / Broadcast Production	Outstanding Achievement for Voice Acting in an Animated Feature Production
Maurice LaMarche as Mr. Big in Zootopia+: "The Godfather of the Bride"; Candi Milo as Witch Hazel in Looney Tunes Cartoons: "Hex Appeal"; Fred Tatasciore as Bang in StoryBots: Answer Time: "Glue"; Tara Strong as Batgirl, Harley Quinn and Raven in Teen Titans Go! & DC Super Hero Girls: Mayhem in the Multiverse; Karen Malina White as Dijonay Jones in The Proud Family: Louder and Prouder: "New Kids On the Block"	Jenny Slate as Marcel in Marcel the Shell with Shoes On; Gregory Mann as Pinocchio in Guillermo del Toro's Pinocchio; David Bradley as Geppetto in Guillermo del Toro's Pinocchio; Wagner Moura as Wolf / Death in Puss in Boots: The Last Wish; Zaris-Angel Hator as Maisie Brumble in The Sea Beast
Outstanding Achievement for Writing in an Animated Television / Broadcast Production	Outstanding Achievement for Writing in an Animated Feature Production
Love Death + Robots: "Bad Traveling" – Andrew Kevin Walker; Baymax!: "Sofia" – Cirocco Dunlap; Big Nate: "The Legend of the Gunting" – Mitch Watson, Emily Brundige, Ben Lapides, Sarah Allan; The House – Enda Walsh; Tuca & Bertie: "The Pain Garden" – Lisa Hanawalt	Marcel the Shell with Shoes On – Dean Fleischer Camp, Jenny Slate, Nick Paley, Elisabeth Holm; Eternal Spring – Jason Loftus; Inu-Oh – Akiko Nogi; Turning Red – Domee Shi, Julia Cho

== Juried awards ==
=== June Foray Award ===
- Mindy Johnson

=== The Certificate of Merit Award ===
- John Omohundro

=== Ub Iwerks Award ===
- Visual Effects Reference Platform

=== Winsor McCay Lifetime Achievement Awards ===
- Pete Docter
- Evelyn Lambart (posthumously)
- Craig McCracken

== Multiple awards and nominations ==
=== Films ===
The following films received multiple nominations:

Nominations	Film
9	Guillermo del Toro's Pinocchio
7	Turning Red
6	Puss in Boots: The Last Wish
6	The Sea Beast
5	The Bad Guys
4	Marcel the Shell with Shoes On
4	Minions: The Rise of Gru
3	Wendell & Wild
2	Avatar: The Way of Water
2	My Father's Dragon
2	Strange World
2	Mad God
2	Inu-Oh
2	Lightyear

The following films received multiple awards:

Wins	Film
5	Guillermo del Toro's Pinocchio
3	Marcel the Shell with Shoes On
2	Avatar: The Way of Water
2	Puss in Boots: The Last Wish

=== Television/Broadcast ===
The following shows received multiple nominations:

Nominations	Show
7	The Boy, the Mole, the Fox and the Horse
6	The House
6	Oni: Thunder God's Tale
5	Love, Death & Robots
3	Baymax!
2	Amphibia
2	Big Nate
2	The Cuphead Show!
2	Entergalactic
2	Looney Tunes Cartoons
2	Prehistoric Planet
2	Spirit Rangers
2	StoryBots: Answer Time
2	Tuca & Bertie

The following shows received multiple awards:

Wins	Show
4	The Boy, the Mole, the Fox and the Horse
4	Love, Death & Robots
2	Oni: Thunder God's Tale
