= Always Remember: The Boy, the Mole, the Fox, the Horse and the Storm =

2025 illustrated book by Charlie Mackesy

The Boy, the Mole, the Fox and the Horse and the Storm
- Author: Charlie Mackesy
- Illustrator: Charlie Mackesy
- Cover artist: Charlie Mackesy
- Language: English
- Genre: Illustrated fable, Philosophical fiction, Self-help
- Publisher: Ebury Press (UK); Penguin Life (US)
- Publication date: 9 October 2025 (UK); 14 October 2025 (US)
- Publication place: England
- Media type: Print (hardcover)
- Pages: 128 (unpaginated)
- ISBN: 9781529108446 (UK hardcover 1st ed.)
- OCLC: 1520208146
- Dewey Decimal: 158.10941
- LC Class: PN6737.M35 A49 2025
- Preceded by: The Boy, the Mole, the Fox and the Horse (2019)

Always Remember: The Boy, the Mole, the Fox, the Horse and the Storm is a 2025 illustrated book by Charlie Mackesy. It continues the developing friendship between the four main protagonists. This is the sequel/continuation of the first book,The Boy, the Mole, the Fox and the Horse (2019).

== Summary ==
Always Remember: The Boy, the Mole, the Fox, the Horse and the Storm is the sequel to The Boy, the Mole, the Fox and the Horse (2019) by Charlie Mackesy. The book reunites the four central characters as they face both a literal and emotional storm, using the journey as a metaphor for grief, fear, uncertainty, and perseverance. Like its predecessor, the story unfolds through short conversations, handwritten reflections, and minimalist ink illustrations rather than a conventional narrative structure.

== Reception ==
The Boy, the Mole, the Fox, the Horse and the Storm very quickly became a bestseller in a number of countries.

== In popular culture ==
On BBC Breakfast in October 2025 Charlie Mackesy was interviewed by Colin Paterson where he discussed the new book. Among various other things he recalled the theft of his iPad from his car some years prior, and that the iPad contained many of his original drawings for the book. In the same month he also featured on BBC Radio 4's Today Programme.
