= Short Circuit (TV series) =

Disney animated series

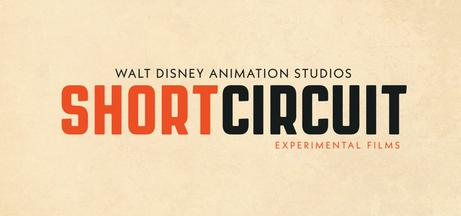
- Logo
- Created by: Walt Disney Animation Studios
- Years: 2020–present

Films and television
- Short film: See below

Short Circuit is a series of American independent animated short films produced by Walt Disney Animation Studios. Similar to the SparkShorts program launched at sister animation studio Pixar, the series is a program in which the employees pitch their ideas for a short and work with fellow employees to create the short if selected, and is meant to take risks in both visual styles and storytelling.

The shorts were released exclusively on Disney+ on January 24, 2020. A second cycle of animated shorts premiered on August 4, 2021.

== Production ==
Development on the Short Circuit program began in 2016. Similar to sister animation studio Pixar's SparkShorts, Walt Disney Animation Studios launched a program named Short Circuit, consisting of a series of shorts of an experimental nature where any employee working at the studio can pitch an idea and can make a short if selected. In a statement, Disney said that "[t]he goal of this innovative program is to take risks in both visual style and story, surface new voices at the studio, and experiment with new technical innovation". The first short released under the program is Cycles, directed by Jeff Gipson, which is Disney's first VR short.

== Episodes ==
| Season | Episodes | | Originally released |
|---|---|---|---|
| 1 | 14 | | January 24, 2020 |
| 2 | 6 | 5 | August 4, 2021 |
| 2 | 6 | 1 | September 14, 2022 |
| 3 | 2 | | March 18, 2026 |

=== Season 1 (2020) ===
| No. overall | No. in season | Title | Directed by | Composed by | Online release date |
|---|---|---|---|---|---|
| 1 | 1 | Puddles | Zach Parrish | Nathan Curtis | January 24, 2020 |
A little boy named Noah discovers that the puddles outside his home can transport him to another world. He tries to show his older sister Skylar his new discovery, but she is more concerned with looking at her phone. Finally fed up with his sister ignoring him, Noah grabs Skylar's phone and tosses into the puddle where it disappears. They both jump in and it is revealed that the other world is full of puddle topped mountains with fish and whales flying through the skies. Skylar tries to take a photo on her phone, but a fish eats it leaving the two siblings to have fun. Note: Debuted at D23 Expo. (Note: The short premiered at the D23 Expo as a VR short on August 25, 2019.)
| 2 | 2 | Exchange Student | Natalie Nourigat | Nathan Curtis | January 24, 2020 |
A human girl transfers to a school on another planet full of blue blob–like aliens. She is literally alienated by them due to her differing tastes and appearance. During recess, one of the aliens kicks their ball over a fence and the girl decides to go and retrieve it. She finds it in a bed of plants where one of them bites her. She screams which scares the plants and she continues to do this where she finds more lost items hiding in the bushes. She returns the lost items to the aliens who all accept her into their group and she in turn introduces them to pizza.
| 3 | 3 | Lucky Toupée | Nikki Mull | Nathan Curtis | January 24, 2020 |
A man named Devin O'Leary has made a deal with gangster leprechauns for a new wig to hide his bald head so that he can meet with his lover Kate who he has not seen in a long time. When he does not have enough to pay for it, a fight for the wig ensues. Devin manages to toss the leprechaun out the window just in time for Kate to show up. However, the leprechaun steals the wig back, humiliating Devin. In a humorous twist, it is revealed that Kate herself has gone bald and the two continue their date just as planned.
| 4 | 4 | Just a Thought | Brian F. Menz | Tangelene Bolton | January 24, 2020 |
Presented in the style of a newspaper comic strip, Ollie meets a new girl who he immediately falls in love with. His thought bubble reveals his secretive love for her and tries to convince Ollie to approach her, but he is too nervous to talk to her. He tries to get rid of his bubble, but it interrupts his class and reveals his feelings for her causing the entire class to laugh at him and leaving him humiliated. After school, the girl arrives with her thought bubble, revealing that she likes Ollie and the two of them hold hands just as their bubbles do so too. Note: Debuted at Annecy International Animated Film Festival. (Note: The short premiered at the Annecy International Festival as a VR short on June 14, 2019.)
| 5 | 5 | Cycles | Jeff Gipson | Jaquie Gipson | January 24, 2020 |
Told in reverse order in a 1960s era abode, the film tells the story of Bert, Rae and their daughter Rachel. Scenes play out revealing how Bert and Rae moved into their new home and welcomed Rachel into their lives. Bert eventually dies of a heart attack and an adult Rachel convinces Rae that they must move out now. As Rae reminisces on her life she tells Rachel, "I'm gonna miss my home". Note: Screened at SIGGRAPH. (Note: The short premiered at the Vancouver Film Festival as a VR short on August 12, 2018.)
| 6 | 6 | Lightning in a Bottle | Virgilio John Aquino | Tom Howe | January 24, 2020 |
A farm boy wants to literally catch lightning in a bottle for his elementary school science fair. He succeeds and discovers a living ball of lightning creature. After dodging dangerous bolts of lightning, the lightning creature slows down time and reveals that it has a family of its own that it wants to return to. The boy solemnly lets the lightning creature go and it repays him with lightning works display. Note: Debuted at D23 Expo. (Note: The short premiered at the D23 Expo as a VR short on August 25, 2019.)
| 7 | 7 | The Race | Terry Moews | Mondo Boys | January 24, 2020 |
Grim, a grim reaper, needs to collect his 100th soul so that he can earn the coveted "Death of the Year" award. His target is a cyclist who is taking part in a big race. The cyclist immediately passes Grim to make it to the finish line and Grim follows in hot pursuit on his own bike, accidentally offing other people along the way. The cyclist wins the race with Grim closing in on him. However, upon seeing the cyclist with his loved one, Grim has an epiphany about the importance of his loved one and decides to take off; grabbing a bouquet of flowers on the way back home.
| 8 | 8 | Hair-Jitsu | Brian Estrada | Jeremy Nathan Tisser | January 24, 2020 |
A young girl highly skilled in taekwondo is taken by her mother to get her exceedingly long hair cut at the barber's shop. She enters a fantasy sequence where she must do battle with the barber and his ninjas, but her mother puts a stop to this and the girl has her hair cut. She discovers that she likes her new appearance and happily leaves, though her cut hair still attacks the barber.
| 9 | 9 | Downtown | Kendra Vander Vliet | Benjamin Robinson | January 24, 2020 |
A commuter misses his bus and becomes exhausted. Suddenly, a colorful graffiti mural comes to life and takes the commuter on a wild ride through the city dodging cars and vehicles and zooming through the streets. The commuter soon takes to it and begins running up the side of buildings to a colorful new world. At the end of the fantasy, the commuter looks to appreciate the mural.
| 10 | 10 | Jing Hua (Note: The short is listed onscreen as 京华 Flower in the Mirror.) | Jerry Huynh | Joy Ngiaw | January 24, 2020 |
A martial artist named Jing Hua stands in front of the grave of her deceased master. She exerts her frustration by performing kung fu; creating the world around her as it is made of water colors and ink. As her pain and sorrow at the loss of a loved one climaxes through the appearance of dripping ink, Jing Hua learns to accept the fate of her master as she becomes tired, but undefeated. Note: Debuted at Annecy International Animated Film Festival. (Note: The short premiered at the Annecy International Festival as a VR short on June 14, 2019.)
| 11 | 11 | Drop | Trent Correy | Nathan Curtis | January 24, 2020 |
Drop, a water droplet, awakens in the sky to his new surroundings. He falls towards the earth with his fellow rain drops in a terrified manner and finds himself being tossed and swished around by the city below. He eventually ends up on a car where he makes contact with a little girl. Taken by the experience, Drop is absorbed back into the sky and excitedly awaits his return in the next storm. Note: Debuted at Ottawa International Animation Festival. (Note: The short premiered at the Ottawa International Animation Festival as a VR short on September 28, 2019.)
| 12 | 12 | Zenith | Jennifer Stratton | Nathan Curtis | January 24, 2020 |
A luminous stag that leaps through the universe creating constellations of various figures all throughout space. Upon noticing some debris on his antlers, he accidentally creates a black hole that begins sucking up all of his work. The stag tries to stop it, but damages one of his antlers in the process. With no other option, the stag summons a lot of energy and races towards the black hole, blowing it up in a magnificent display. The constellations return, but at the cost of the stag who instead has become the galaxy that encompasses them all. Note: Debuted at D23 Expo. (Note: The short premiered at the D23 Expo as a VR short on August 25, 2019.)
| 13 | 13 | Elephant in the Room | Brian Scott | Toft Willingham | January 24, 2020 |
A baby elephant gets separated from his family, but is found by a young boy and his father. The father immediately puts the elephant to work in collecting bananas in their banana plantation, but the boy bonds with the elephant by playing with him. Despite this, the elephant still wishes to be reunited with his herd which the boy recognizes. One day, the boy arrives with a bushel of bananas and numerous elephants chasing him back home. The baby is reunited with his family as the boy and his father look on. Later, the boy and his father are reunited with the happy elephant. Note: Debuted at D23 Expo. (Note: The short premiered at the D23 Expo as a VR short on August 25, 2019.)
| 14 | 14 | Fetch | Mitchell Counsell | Tori Letzler | January 24, 2020 |
A little girl wanders into the woods with a stick looking for Oliver, her pet. As she ventures deep into the woods, a large black furry creature with glowing blue eyes follows the little girl. It is soon revealed that this large intimidating creature, who displays dog–like behavior, is in actuality, Oliver who displays an affinity for chasing sticks and eating junk that it shares with the girl. Note: Debuted at Ottawa International Animation Festival. (Note: The short premiered at the Ottawa International Animation Festival as a VR short on September 28, 2019.)

=== Season 2 (2021–22) ===
| No. overall | No. in season | Title | Directed by | Composed by | Online release date |
|---|---|---|---|---|---|
| 15 | 1 | Crosswalk | Ryan Green | Jake Monaco | August 4, 2021 |
A man comes upon a crosswalk to work, but soon grows agitated when the light begins to mock him for not being able to cross. Angered over such a thing ruining his life, he summons the courage to leap across the crosswalk against the light's wishes. Upon getting to the other side however, he realizes that he forgot his briefcase, amusing the light who responds with "LOL".
| 16 | 2 | Going Home | Jacob Frey | Jake Monaco | August 4, 2021 |
A young man arrives in his home town over the course of several seasons. With each passing season, the people and places around him begin to change. He finally arrives at his home where he is greeted by his parents and dog. As time passes on however, they presumably pass on. The young man was packing up his things and moving out. He is later comforted by his wife and daughter.
| 17 | 3 | No. 2 to Kettering (Note: The short is listed onscreen as 2 Kettering.) | Liza Rhea | Tom Howe | August 4, 2021 |
A young happy girl gets on a bus to Kettering. As she greets the driver and passengers, she is met with disdain and slowly begins to lose her color. Eventually, she comes across a baby that begins to play with her hat. When the baby begins to giggle, everyone on the bus suddenly begins to laugh along with him. The girl becomes happy again and leaves the bus, this time given a pleasant response by the driver.
| 18 | 4 | Dinosaur Barbarian | Kim Hazel | Mondo Boys | August 4, 2021 |
Dinosaur Barbarian loves to fight monsters, but soon his habit catches up to him when he cannot pay his electric bill and a fair princess finds him stinky. Now with a new goal, the Dinosaur Barbarian proceeds to clean up his act while also continuing his monster fights.
| 19 | 5 | Songs to Sing in the Dark | Riannon Delanoy | Benjamin Robinson & Riannon Delanoy | August 4, 2021 |
Two creatures encounter each other in a dark cave and begin to "argue" with one another through the use of making acoustic sounds that exhibit images. Eventually, the two creatures begin to get along when suddenly a third source of noise arrives, forcing the two creatures to team up against it.
| 20 | 6 | Reflect | Hillary Bradfield | Jake Monaco | September 14, 2022 |
A plus-size girl is in the middle of her ballet class when she begins to feel self-conscious about her body. This is personified as the class mirror shattering and enveloping her. Ultimately, she overcomes this by performing her ballet dancing and accepts herself for who she is.

=== Season 3 (2026) ===
| No. overall | No. in season | Title | Directed by | Composed by | Online release date |
|---|---|---|---|---|---|
| 21 | 1 | Life Drawings | Larry Wu | Lauren Harold | March 18, 2026 |
Depicts the life of an artist from childhood to adulthood as he follows his dream and attempts to perfect his craft. Eventually, marriage, a child, and his carpal tunnel take hold and it appears that he will never achieve that dream. His daughter soon shows an interest in drawing and he gives her his tools so that she can pursue her dream.
| 22 | 2 | Maddie & the Test | Heather M. Roberts Russell | Lauren Harold | March 18, 2026 |
A dyslexic girl must take a test, but has difficulty comprehending the sentences. Her own written name anthropomorphizes and attempts to help her, but things get worse. Using a reading tool, she finally calms down and slowly begins to go through each word deliberately, eventually overcoming her insecurities.

=== Stand alone release ===
| Title | Directed by | Composed by | Release date |
|---|---|---|---|
| "Versa" | Malcon Pierce | Haim Mazar | March 27, 2026 |
In a cosmic setting, a couple experience the loss of their child. While the husband attempts to run from his pain, the wife confronts it head on. Eventually, the two embrace their pain together, allowing them to heal from it and start anew. They eventually welcome another child into their world. Note: Debuted at Annecy International Animated Film Festival.

=== Unaired shorts ===
| Title | Directed by | Composed by | Release date |
|---|---|---|---|
| "a kite's tale" | Bruce Wright | Joy Ngiaw | July 28, 2019 |
A whimsical tale of two clashing kites—a playful puppy and a pompous dragon—who must learn to live with one another subject to the winds of fate. The short combines hand-drawn animation and virtual reality technology. Premiered at SIGGRAPH.

== Release ==
Short Circuit's first three shorts, Exchange Student, Jing Hua, and Just a Thought, premiered at Annecy. Later shorts were played at the El Capitan Theatre, attached to The Lion King in selected screenings. The shorts were screened at the D23 Expo.

The shorts were publicly released on January 24, 2020, on Disney+. Unlike most original Disney+ content, the shorts were released all at once, instead of being released on a weekly basis. One day after its release, the short Drop was temporarily removed from the service, due to technical issues with the intro to the short. It has since been added back.

Five new shorts premiered on August 4, 2021.

== Reception ==
=== Critical response ===
Petrana Radulovic of Polygon called Short Circuit a "reinvented Fantasia": writing: "Short Circuit proves that the Fantasia format still works for the streaming age — with a few little tweaks here and there. With such a wide range of visual styles and stories that span from cute childhood adventures to poignant heartbreak, the anthology is absolutely worth a watch". Ashley Moulton of Common Sense Media gave Short Circuit a grade of 4 out of 5 stars, calling the animated shorts "delightful".
