= Barbie Mysteries =

Two-themed children's private investigation television series

- Logo for the second season as Beach Detectives and the current logo
- Genre: Children/Family; Mystery
- Directed by: Seth Kearsley (supervision); Collette Sunderman (voice)
- Voices of: Abby Trott; Diamond White; Griffin Burns; Carlos Alazraqui; Will Friedle; Jennifer Hale; Laraine Newman; Skarlett Redd
- Ending theme: Meet Me at the Top; 0200; (both end choruses only)
- Composer: Joy Ngiaw
- Countries of origin: United States; Canada
- Original language: English
- No. of seasons: 2
- No. of episodes: 16

Production
- Producer: Jeffrey R. Hawley
- Running time: 23–25 minutes
- Production companies: Mattel Television Studios; Netflix Animation; Kickstart Entertainment

Original release
- Network: Netflix
- Release: November 1, 2024 – August 28, 2025

Logo for the first part of the series as The Great Horse Chase

Barbie Mysteries is a CGI-animated children's mystery television series that was released on Netflix in two parts; Barbie Mysteries: The Great Horse Chase on November 1, 2024 and Barbie Mysteries: Beach Detectives within Malibu's beaches on August 28, 2025.

It was produced by Mattel Television Studios, Netflix Animation and Canada-based Kickstart Entertainment.

== Premise ==
In The Great Horse Chase, Barbie from Malibu and Barbie from Brooklyn travel to the countryside in England to have adventures in equestrianism. But when two horses; Pepper and Tornado, go missing, it is up to the girls to crack the case, try to interview potential witnesses and suspects and get to the bottom of the case for a resolve.

In Beach Detectives, the Barbies return to Malibu for the Malibu Beach Bash along with Ken, Nikki, Renee and Daisy, alongside newcomer Marcus to have enchanting adventures in the beach fronts. But when thefts arise out of the blue and from unsuspecting corners, it is up to the girls to crack the case, try to interview potential witnesses and suspects and get to the bottom of the case for a resolve.

== Cast ==
- Abby Trott as Barbie "Malibu" Roberts
- Diamond White as Barbie "Brooklyn" Roberts
- Griffin Burns as Ken
- Carlos Alazraqui as Maury Wynin
- Will Friedle as William Warlock
- Jennifer Hale as Madame Celeste
- Laraine Newman as Alice
- Skarlett Redd as Zoe

== Episodes ==
Season	Episodes	Originally released
1	8	November 1, 2024
2	8	August 28, 2025

=== Season 1: The Great Horse Chase (2024) ===
The table below shows only the titles and episode summaries from the American Netflix release.

No. overall	No. in season	Title	Directed by	Written by	Original release date
1	1	"Hold Those Horses!"	Larry Anderson	Ann Austen	November 1, 2024
The girls arrive at Carson Estate for a weeklong stay with Ken's wealthy aunt. But on their very first night, a prized horse and saddle go missing.
2	2	"Taking the Reins"	Dominic "Dom" MacKinnon	Ann Austen	November 1, 2024
Everyone's a suspect, so the Barbies hunt for clues to clear their names. Are Lady Puddington's muddy shoes a sign of guilt — or just a fashion crime?
3	3	"Veering Off Course"	Dominic "Dom" MacKinnon	Margaret Dunlap	November 1, 2024
Denholm seems awfully suspicious... until Lady Carson reveals she might have a motive. Ken and Marcus arrive in London. Cassidy makes an unexpected move.
4	4	"One Horse Fashion Show"	Larry Anderson	Daniel Bryan Franklin	November 1, 2024
Brooklyn and Malibu follow Cassidy to Venice, where they're pulled into a fashion-forward side quest and reunite with an old friend.
5	5	"As Good as Gondola"	Larry Anderson	Meg Favreau	November 1, 2024
The teen detectives split up into three different groups: one to find Pepper, one to track down Dietrich, and one to keep an eye on Giovanni.
6	6	"Back in the Saddle"	Dominic "Dom" MacKinnon	Story by : Amber May; Teleplay by : Daniel Bryan Franklin	November 1, 2024
Surprising confessions come to light as Brooklyn and Malibu team up to protect precious cargo aboard a speeding train headed back to England.
7	7	"Down to the Wire"	Larry Anderson	Julia Hernandez	November 1, 2024
With the competition looming and Pepper still on the loose, the Carsons need another horse — and someone to ride her. The gang sets a trap for Giovanni.
8	8	"Jumping to Conclusions"	Dominic "Dom" MacKinnon	Tamika Cosen	November 1, 2024
The Barbies have a plan to rescue the horses, recover the saddle and win the championship, too. But it'll take everyone on the team to pull it off!

=== Season 2: Beach Detectives (2025) ===
The table below shows only the titles and episode summaries from the American Netflix release.

No. overall	No. in season	Title	Directed by	Written by	Original release date
9	1	"Beach Bash Begins"	Seth Kearsley	Leore Berris	August 28, 2025
A new school year begins with "Brooklyn" and Rocki joining Golden Beach High. At the same time, a mysterious new student named Leo enrolls, and a magical gem is stolen from Mesmer. Barbie and Brooklyn suspect that something strange is happening in Malibu.
10	2	"How the Crystal Ball Bounces"	Seth Kearsley	Megan Gonzalez	August 28, 2025
During a school field trip to a museum, a mysterious new student named Leo joins the group. Leo inspects an ancient vase artifact from the Pacific Ocean, but someone tries to steal something, leading to the cancellation of the field trip. Malibu and Brooklyn suspect that Leo attempted to steal a gem. Meanwhile, Peggy visits Ken and informs him that an air gem has been stolen from Mesmer. She believes that someone brought it to the human world to unite it with two other powerful gems. Ken borrows Elvy's staff to detect magic from the museum gem, but nothing happens. Unbeknownst to him, the magical item is actually the ancient vase in the museum. In parallel, Brooklyn and Daisy become closer while working on the school play. Chelsea, on the other hand, thinks she can use magic to win a spelling bee, but she ultimately relies on her own abilities.
11	3	"Now You See Her"	Monica Davila	Barbara Haynes	August 28, 2025
When a mysterious creature called a bunnycorn tries to sabotage Simone and Kel's exhibit opening at the museum, Malibu and Brooklyn chase after him before his sneaking ends the magical night in a wreck. Meanwhile, Stacie attempts to hide from the Glyph Council when she has to come with Rocki for a presentation on how humans act.
12	4	"Welcome to the Fun House"	Seth Kearsley	Brandon Hoang	August 28, 2025
Malibu and Brooklyn attempt to summon the bunnycorn to learn who its master is while Ned and Ted try to accomplish the same goal to prove that there's magic in Malibu for their documentary. Meanwhile, Skipper starts her own club at the dreamhouse to avoid being left out.
13	5	"Girls Just Wanna Have Sun"	Seth Kearsley	Claire Jia & Lisa Deng	August 28, 2025
While at Dru's house in Malibu, Leo discovers a book with a figurine of a unicorn girl inside. When he pulls it out, she transforms into a real unicorn named Victory. Malibu, Brooklyn, Stacie, Chelsea, and Skipper bring Victory to the fair, where a fortune teller predicts subjects of the future.
14	6	"The Legend of the Acceletrix"	Monica Davila	Lizzie Prestel	August 28, 2025
When Leo's potion to keep him from turning into a centaur runs out, he and Malibu must visit a vampire to get a refill. Meanwhile, Teresa and Brooklyn journey to Mesmer to return Victory to her three unicorn sisters, who take Teresa and Brooklyn through a set of challenges to see if they are worthy.
15	7	"Spell Bound"	Seth Kearsley	Marsha Griffin	August 28, 2025
After Brooklyn falls into a magical whirlpool in Mesmer, she transforms into a mermaid and reunites with a mermaid friend named Talleigha, as well as meeting London, Harper, Charlie, Emily, and Coralia. Together, they try to find the water gem, which slips through a portal and disappears. Brooklyn chases after it while Malibu, Rocki, Ken, and Leo read about the legend of the centaurs and the Sapphire Fairycorn.
16	8	"A Real Showstopper"	Seth Kearsley	Crescent Imani Novell	August 28, 2025
As Malibu jumps from portal to portal as a mermaid looking for Brooklyn, Brooklyn herself struggles to escape from Banishment Island, where Will the Wizard Lizard is trying to help her escape, secretly after the water gem that could bring him freedom.

== Soundtracks ==
With this series released in two themed parts, it was accompanied by their eponymous soundtrack albums, which was released on global music streaming services on the same day as their releases.

=== The Great Horse Chase ===
Barbie Mysteries: The Great Horse Chase

Soundtrack album by The Math Club
- Released: November 1, 2024
- Genre: Children's music
- Label: Mattel–Arts Music
- Producer: The Math Club

All lyrics are written by The Math Club; all music is composed by The Math Club.

No.	Title	Lead vocals	Length
1.	"We Ride Together"	Madison Reyes	2:51
2.	"Glittering"	Jordin Sparks	2:45
3.	"Meet Me At The Top"	Journi	3:29
4.	"Came To Win"	Hayes Warner	2:47
Total length:			11:52

=== Beach Detectives ===
Barbie Mysteries: Beach Detectives

Soundtrack album by The Math Club
- Released: August 28, 2025
- Genre: Children's music
- Label: Mattel–Arts Music
- Producer: The Math Club

All lyrics are written by The Math Club; all music is composed by The Math Club.

No.	Title	Length
1.	"02100"	2:56
2.	"Good Life"	3:38
3.	"Fool Me Twice"	2:54
4.	"Who Could Really Stop Us If We Tried"	2:43
5.	"Satellites"	3:15
Total length:		12:40
