= Joy Ngiaw =

Malaysian composer (born 1994)

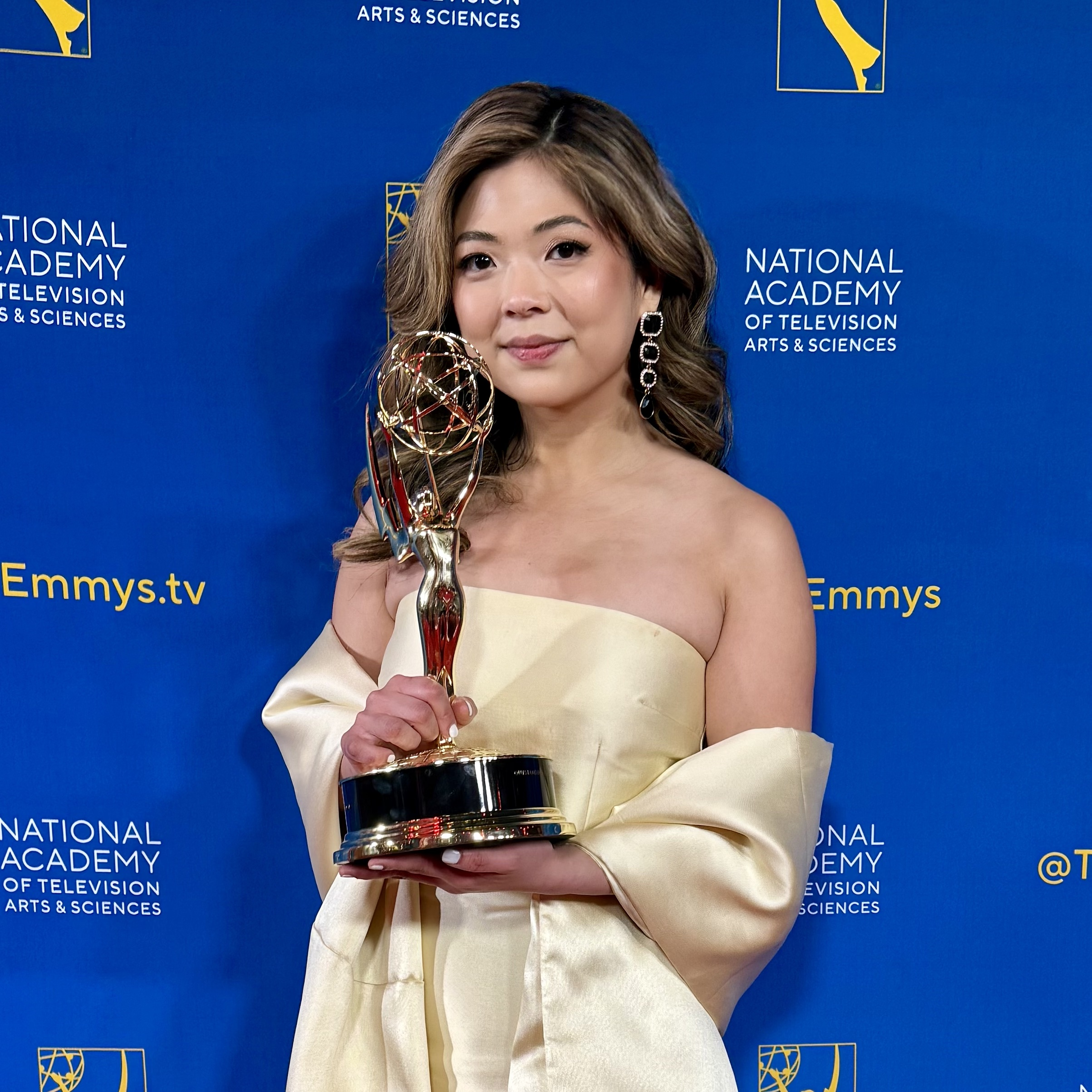

Background information
- Born: Jing Yi Ngiaw; November 23, 1994 (age 31); Pahang, Malaysia
- Genres: Film and television scores, soundtracks
- Occupation: Composer
- Instruments: Vocals, piano
- Years active: 2018–present
- Website: joyngiaw.com

Jing Yi "Joy" Ngiaw (born November 23, 1994) is a Malaysian film and television composer. She won the Children's and Family Emmy Award for Outstanding Music Direction and Composition for an Animated Program for her work on WondLa, becoming the first Malaysian to win an Emmy Award. She collaborated closely with John Lasseter on the series, and the score was featured in IndieWire's "Best TV Scores of the Year, According to Our Composers Survey"', alongside The White Lotus and Severance.

Her score for Apple TV+ and Skydance's debut animation Blush has won Best Music Award from Hollywood Music in Media and was nominated for an Annie. She also scored Skydance Animation's inaugural studio logo, and Angel Studios theatrical romantic comedy Solo Mio, starring Kevin James.

Among her other projects include Monkeypaw Productions' The Pigs Underneath, Netflix and CBS's TV show Glamorous starring Kim Cattrall, Mattel and Netflix's Barbie Mysteries, Walt Disney Animation Studios' Short Circuit: Jing Hua, and Netflix's Rescued by Ruby.

Ngiaw was named a BAFTA Breakthrough USA honoree in 2024. She was also featured on Apple "Here's to the Dreamers" campaign, spotlighting ambitious creative talent across Southeast Asia.

== Early life and education ==
Ngiaw was born in Pahang, Malaysia, and raised in Shanghai, China. She started playing classical piano at six, and had played piano for the New Shanghai Orchestra in her high school years. She then attended Berklee College of Music for a major in Film Scoring and minor in Video Game Scoring. At Berklee, Ngiaw was one of the eight students chosen to compose a new score for F. W. Murnau's 1922 Nosferatu, which was performed by the Boston Pops at Boston Symphony Hall on Friday, October 30, 2015.

== Career ==
After moving to Los Angeles in 2016, she worked in the music department for television series such as Legion (FX), Cobra Kai (Netflix), The Night Of (HBO), films Impractical Jokers: The Movie (WarnerMedia), and video games What Remains of Edith Finch.

In 2021, Ngiaw scored Skydance Animation's first short film Blush, executive produced by David Ellison, Dana Goldberg and John Lasseter. Her score had won the 2021 Hollywood Music in Media Awards for Best Music, and nominated for an Annie Award for Outstanding Achievement for Music in an Animated Television/Media Production. In 2022, she was also nominated with the inaugural David Raksin Emerging Talent award by the Society of Composers & Lyricists. She then went on to score Skydance Animation studio's first studio logo. The animated sequence made its debut on the studios' first feature Luck, and will be attached to Skydance's animated film slate, which includes the Alan Menken–scored Spellbound, Nathan Greno's Swapped and Brad Bird's Ray Gunn, going forward.

She is also the composer for Skydance Animation's TV series WondLa, an animated sci-fi fantasy television series based on the books The Search for WondLa, A Hero for WondLa, and The Battle for WondLa by Tony DiTerlizzi. Her 3 season soundtracks for WondLa was released by Milan Records.

In 2023, she scored her first episodic TV series, Netflix's Glamorous, created by Jordon Nardino and starring Kim Cattrall and Miss Benny. Her score was released by Lakeshore Records on July 7, 2023.

In 2024, Ngiaw was selected to participate in the Universal Composers Initiative, a competitive two-year development program for emerging film and television composers run by Universal Film Music and NBCUniversal.

In 2026, Ngiaw composed the score for the romantic comedy Solo Mio, distributed by Angel Studios and starring Kevin James. The film was the studio's first romantic comedy release and opened to $7.2 million at the box office, receiving an A− CinemaScore and an 81% critics score on Rotten Tomatoes.

Ngiaw is the first Malaysian to win an Emmy Award. This milestone follows in the footsteps of Hollywood star Michelle Yeoh, who previously made history as the first Malaysian to win an Oscar and Golden Globe.

== Filmography ==
=== Films ===
Year	Title	Director	Distributors(s)	Notes
2026	Solo Mio	Chuck Kinnane; Dan Kinnane	Angel Studios	—N/a
2025	The Pigs Underneath	Charlie Dennis	Monkeypaw Productions	TIFF 2025
2022	Rescued by Ruby	Katt Shea	Netflix	—N/a
2021	Blush	Joe Mateo	Apple Original Films	Animated Short Film
2021	Petit Rat	Vera Wagman	PBS	Documentary Feature
2021	June & Kopi	Noviandra Santosa	Netflix	—N/a
2019	In A New York Minute	Mandy Li	Gravitas Ventures	—N/a

=== Television ===
Year	Title	Creators	Distributors(s)	Notes
2025	WondLa	Bobs Gannaway	Apple TV+	Season 3
2025	Barbie Mysteries	Seth Kearsley	Netflix	Season 2
2025	WondLa	Bobs Gannaway	Apple TV+	Season 2
2024	Barbie Mysteries	Seth Kearsley	Netflix	Season 1
2024	WondLa	Bobs Gannaway	Apple TV+	Season 1
2023	Glamorous	Jordon Nardino	Netflix	Season 1
2018	Short Circuit	Jerry Huynh	Walt Disney Animation	Season 1 Episode 10: "Jing Hua"

== Awards and nominations ==
Year	Result	Award	Category	Work
2026	Won	Children's and Family Emmy Award	Outstanding Music Direction and Composition	WondLa
2024	Nominated	Annie Award	Outstanding Achievement for Music in an Animated Television/Media Production	WondLa
2022	Nominated	The Society of Composers and Lyricists (SCL) Awards	David Raskin Award for Emerging Talent	Blush
2022	Nominated	Annie Award	Outstanding Achievement for Music in an Animated Television/Media Production	Blush
2022	Won	Music + Sound Awards, International	Best Original Composition in a Short Film	Blush
2022	Won	London International Film Festival	Best Original Score	Mutiny!
2021	Won	Hollywood Music in Media Awards	Best Original Score - Short Film	Blush
2019	Won	Asians On Film Festival	Best Original Score	Fish Head
