= The Boy, the Mole, the Fox and the Horse (film) =

2022 animated short film by Peter Baynton

- Release poster
- Directed by: Peter Baynton; Charlie Mackesy
- Screenplay by: Jon Croker; Charlie Mackesy
- Based on: The Boy, the Mole, the Fox and the Horse by Charlie Mackesy
- Produced by: Cara Speller; Matthew Freud; Hannah Minghella; J. J. Abrams
- Starring: Jude Coward Nicoll; Tom Hollander; Idris Elba; Gabriel Byrne
- Edited by: Daniel Budin
- Music by: Isobel Waller-Bridge
- Production companies: Apple Studios; Bad Robot Productions; NoneMore Productions
- Distributed by: Apple TV+ (United States); BBC One; BBC iPlayer (United Kingdom)
- Release dates: 24 December 2022 (United Kingdom); 25 December 2022 (United States)
- Running time: 34 minutes
- Countries: United Kingdom; United States
- Language: English

The Boy, the Mole, the Fox and the Horse is a 2022 animated short film directed by Peter Baynton and Charlie Mackesy and written by Jon Croker and Mackesy. It is based on Mackesy's 2019 picture book of the same name. It features the voices of Jude Coward Nicoll, Tom Hollander, Idris Elba, and Gabriel Byrne as the four titular characters who form an unlikely friendship as they travel together in search of the Boy's home.

In early 2020, as the book became a bestseller, several producers attempted to acquire the rights of the novel for a potential screen adaptation. These rights were later acquired by Cara Speller, who collaborated with Matthew Freud in producing the film under their NoneMore Productions banner in their first production. J. J. Abrams also produced the film under the Bad Robot Productions banner. The animation was done remotely during the COVID-19 pandemic, with more than 120 people from over 20 countries working on the film. Since the illustrated book had a loose and unfinished quality of styling, Baynton and his animation team wanted to match this by using pencil ink for the characters, which had an intricate detailing, and watercolour-inspired texture in the background.

The Boy, the Mole, the Fox and the Horse was released in the United Kingdom through BBC One and BBC iPlayer on 24 December 2022 and in other countries on Apple TV+ on 25 December 2022. It was acclaimed by critics and won Best Animated Short Film at the 95th Academy Awards and Best Short Animation at the 76th British Academy Film Awards.

== Plot ==
The Boy is lost in the winter wilderness, where he meets the friendly Mole who offers to help him find his way. The Boy is searching for a home, which he has never had before. While exploring the wilderness, they encounter a river and decide to follow it until they find a village. They are then hunted by a hungry Fox, but are able to hide in a tree until the Fox leaves. After hearing it in distress, however, they search and find the Fox tied to a trap. The Fox threatens the Mole, but despite his fear, the Mole compassionately rescues the Fox who departs in shame. The next morning, the two head back to the river, but the Mole accidentally falls into it and is swept away. The Fox chases after the Mole, and though the Boy fears for his life, the Fox saves the Mole instead. The Boy and the Mole continue on the journey, with the Fox following them at a distance.

Eventually, they encounter the Horse, who is an outcast from the rest of his kind. The group all become friends and explore the themes of humanity, empathy, and compassion. The Boy later sees village lights, and hopes that he is close to finding a home, but he loses sight of the village in the daytime. The Horse reveals that he is actually a pegasus, which incited envy from the other horses, but his friends accept him for who he is. The group fly together on the Horse's back until they can relocate the village. The group say their goodbyes to the Boy, but he decides to not go to the village, declaring that home is wherever loved ones are. The friends stick together and look up at the stars.

== Voice cast ==
- Jude Coward Nicoll as the Boy
- Tom Hollander as the Mole
- Idris Elba as the Fox
- Gabriel Byrne as the Horse

== Production ==
=== Development ===
"We've had different forms of hardness, you know, whether it's pandemic and isolation or whether it's economic I think everyone's just feeling exhausted. It seems to me that if we've ever needed kindness, we need it now. And I don't think there's any human on Earth who couldn't use a bit more kindness or comfort or hope or a healing. It was lovely to read from people's messages during the pandemic about the book and I hope that film can do something similar in this time."

— Charlie Mackesy

In 2019, Charlie Mackesy published the illustrated graphic book The Boy, the Mole, the Fox and the Horse based on his sketches which he posted on Instagram about conversations between a boy, a mole, a fox and a horse. The book was a bestseller, with over 250,000 copies being sold in early 2020, and several producers tried to adapt it into a feature-length work, until he was asked by producers Cara Speller and Matthew Freud to adapt it into an animated short. Speller discovered the book without having the knowledge, but really liked the book after reading it and felt that there was much material which could be adapted into a cinematic piece. Hence, she got in contact with Mackesy and Freud to discuss the creation of a short-length adaptation.

Speller felt that "it was always really important to me right from the start that Charlie be at the center of any team that we put together to make the film. You can tell immediately from the book that he has incredibly strong instincts about what works. To me, it didn't make any sense to try and make that without having him so closely involved." She and Freud then started a production company titled NoneMore Productions, to bankroll the film; J. J. Abrams and Hannah Minghella also produced the film under the Bad Robot Productions banner. Speller found it fascinating how Mackesy, "even though, he obviously created those characters and knows them better than anyone, he learned an awful lot more about them through the process of making the film".

The film was directed by Peter Baynton and co-written by Jon Croker, with Jude Coward Nicoll, a young actor from Scotland, Tom Hollander, Idris Elba and Gabriel Byrne voicing the Boy, the Mole, the Fox and the Horse respectively. Nicoll's casting was a challenge for the creative team, as he was a newcomer to acting and was selected from 300 people who auditioned for the role. He added, "We were looking for a certain fragility and vulnerability in the voice of the boy. We wanted people when they heard the boy's voice to have the instinct to try and take care of him or try and protect him [...] He announces to us right at the start of the film that he's lost and he's looking for a home. We all felt incredibly protective of the boy. And that was the quality we were looking for in the boy's voice: a very soft, very gentle unconfident-sounding voice." Baynton said that "he found this sort of lovely rapport and musical relationship between the voices of Nicoll and Hollander". It felt easy to imagine the duo recording their voices together in a studio, even though both the actors recorded separately due to the pandemic.

=== Animation and design ===
The film had an international crew of over 120–150 people coming from over 20 countries. Production began during the middle of the COVID-19 pandemic, hence each member had to work from their home. Speller built the team in the same way as building a team for a production, as "you're always looking for the most talented artists you can find; it doesn't matter where they are in the world, as long as you think they're the right fit for the project and for the team". She called it a "phenomenal effort" as each member had gone above and beyond in an imaginable way. Mackesy felt that making the film was moving as "it was largely a journey of kindness and friendship, We've all become friends. And so I will always love the process as much as I do the product. And whenever I see it, I can pause the film at any point, and I will remember instances of deep conversation – and occasional argument and disagreement, but always in kindness."

Baynton added that, "Charlie's drawing is underpinned by a great knowledge of anatomy, even though, he draws extremely quickly and quite impressionistically, you can tell he knows horse or boy or fox anatomy so well. For the mole, it's a little bit different." He added that the challenge was translating the exquisite illustrations into hand-drawn animation, and "to find a way of drawing the characters that enabled us to nuance performances that could communicate the subtle emotions that we wanted to express". Since Mackesy had a loose and unfinished quality of style, the process involved drawing the anatomically-correct characters in a pencil line and going over the top in the loose ink, to give it a full shape, and the background was done in a hand-painted style to resemble Mackesy's watercolour texture. The animation team, led by supervisors Tim Watts, Gabriele Zucchelli, Setareh Erfan and art director Mike McCain, worked tightly on detailed models and during the art and storyboard process, he encouraged the artists to find the looser way of inking, that was about "finding that very fine line that sort of drifts around the characters".

On the design of the characters, Baynton said "one of the first things I remember, where you have these very realistic and well-proportioned horse and fox and child, and then this strange, little, graphic mole with tubular circles on this black triangle nose. Like a little doorstop. It's a very charming aspect of what Charlie created, that sort of contrast. In order to animate, we went back to the book, and developed that naturalistic, as non-cartoony as possible approach for the boy, the fox and the horse, and then a bolder animation for the mole."

=== Music ===
Isobel Waller-Bridge composed the film's score; she said that the music was "really Charlie's energy, I think that really sort of fed the score, as well as the actual material from the book. They're so closely related, as you can imagine. So it was just listening to Charlie, honestly, the way he speaks, the way he looks at the world, and then paying close attention to exactly why he made the book and why he felt it was an important thing to make the film. So the music was really just an extension of that energy and everything down to the instrumentation and the choice of the piano that felt really, really important. A lot of those important choices came from Charlie as well, which felt like the right way in." The sound design and music happened simultaneously and the score was written even before the film was completed. The orchestra portions were performed by the BBC Concert Orchestra with Geoff Alexander conducting. The 18-track album consisting of Waller-Bridge's score was released on 23 December 2022 by Sony Masterworks.

== Release ==
In October 2022, it was announced that Apple Studios would distribute The Boy, the Mole, the Fox and the Horse as an Apple Original Film internationally, with the exception of the United Kingdom, where it was released by BBC instead. It was promoted with two trailers being released on 9 December and 12 December 2022, and a two-minute clip was debuted exclusively on Collider on 21 December. The short film premiered first on BBC One and BBC iPlayer on 24 December 2022, and streamed worldwide on the following day through Apple TV+.

== Reception ==
=== Critical response ===
On the review aggregator website Rotten Tomatoes, 78% of nine critics' reviews are positive, with an average rating of 8.2/10. Metacritic, which uses a weighted average, assigned the film a score of 75 out of 100, based on 5 critics, indicating "generally favorable" reviews.

Emily Bernard of Collider gave four-and-a-half stars out of five, and said, "Fans of Mackesy's book will be utterly delighted to see that the hand-drawn illustrations translate beautifully to the screen without losing any of its neat-yet-messy aesthetic. Because the lines are literally pulled from the pages of the detailed original work, the movie feels less like a short film with a progressing story and more like a moving book. It doesn't have the same pacing or plot propulsion that a typical short would, but that just adds to the charm of it." Megan Graye of The Independent wrote, "The Boy, the Mole, the Fox and the Horse is a wake-up call for adults, and a world of wisdom for kids. This 30-minute story will leave you feeling hopeful and probably a little teary. Emerging from it unaffected is just about impossible."

Anita Singh of The Daily Telegraph wrote, "The great thing about this, though, is the look of it. The animation (which owes a debt to Winnie-the-Pooh and The Little Prince) is gorgeous, bringing Mackesy's ink and watercolour drawings to life. Tuning in does allow you to switch off from the world for half an hour. And if watching it feels like drowning in a vat of golden syrup – well, don't we all overdose on sweet things at Christmas?" In a negative review, James Walton of The Spectator said, "Mackesy's film is clearly hoping to join The Snowman as a tear-jerking Christmas classic. The trouble is that this hope is so nakedly, even desperately apparent on screen – with the programme practically begging us to find it both charming and touching."

=== Accolades ===
| Award | Date of ceremony | Category | Recipient(s) | Result | Ref. |
|---|---|---|---|---|---|
| British Academy Film Awards | 19 February 2023 | Best British Short Animation | Peter Baynton, Charlie Mackesy, Cara Speller, Hannah Minghella | Won | |
| Annie Awards | 25 February 2023 | Best Animated Special Production | The Boy, the Mole, the Fox and the Horse | Won | |
| Annie Awards | 25 February 2023 | Outstanding Achievement for Animated Effects in an Animated Television/Broadcast Production | Peter Baynton, Raymond Pang, Martial Coulon | Nominated | |
| Annie Awards | 25 February 2023 | Outstanding Achievement for Character Animation in an Animated Television / Broadcast Production | Tim Watts | Won | |
| Annie Awards | 25 February 2023 | Outstanding Achievement for Directing in an Animated Television / Broadcast Production | Peter Baynton, Charlie Mackesy | Won | |
| Annie Awards | 25 February 2023 | Outstanding Achievement for Editorial in an Animated Television / Broadcast Production | Daniel Budin | Won | |
| Annie Awards | 25 February 2023 | Outstanding Achievement for Music in an Animated Television / Broadcast Production | Isobel Waller-Bridge, Charlie Mackesy | Nominated | |
| Annie Awards | 25 February 2023 | Outstanding Achievement for Production Design in an Animated Television / Broadcast Production | Mike McCain | Nominated | |
| Academy Awards | 12 March 2023 | Best Animated Short Film | Charlie Mackesy and Matthew Freud | Won | |
| Golden Trailer Awards | 29 June 2023 | Best Animation/Family | "Together" (MOTIVE) | Nominated | |
| Golden Trailer Awards | 29 June 2023 | Best Original Score | "Together" (MOTIVE) | Nominated | |
| Golden Trailer Awards | 29 June 2023 | Best Animation / Family TV Spot (for a Feature Film) | "Brave" (MOTIVE) | Nominated | |
