= The Boy, the Mole, the Fox and the Horse =

2019 illustrated book by Charlie Mackesy

- Author: Charlie Mackesy
- Illustrator: Charlie Mackesy
- Cover artist: Charlie Mackesy
- Language: English
- Genre: Illustrated fable, Philosophical fiction, Self-help
- Publisher: Ebury Press (UK); HarperOne (US)
- Publication date: 10 October 2019 (UK); 22 October 2019 (US)
- Publication place: United Kingdom
- Media type: Print (hardcover)
- Pages: 128 (unpaginated)
- ISBN: 9781529105100 (UK hardcover 1st ed.)
- OCLC: 1182792920
- Dewey Decimal: 741.5/941
- LC Class: PN6737.M35 B69 2019
- Followed by: Always Remember: The Boy, the Mole, the Fox, the Horse and the Storm (2025)

The Boy, the Mole, the Fox and the Horse is a 2019 illustrated book by Charlie Mackesy. It follows the developing friendship between the four titular protagonists, which is continued in the sequel: Always Remember: The Boy, the Mole, the Fox, the Horse and the Storm (2025).

== Summary ==
The story is constructed as a series of conversations between the title characters. A boy who feels lonely and uncertain about life wanders through a wilderness, first meeting a mole, then a fox, and finally, a horse. Together, the four experience nature — rivers, storms, open fields — and share thoughts about love, belonging, and hope. The author has said about the book: "I mentioned in the introduction that the book is for anyone, whether they are eight or eighty, but what I did not expect was that eighty-year-olds would be reading it alongside their eight-year-old grandchildren. For me this is the dream."

== Reception ==
The Boy, the Mole, the Fox and the Horse became a bestseller. It has been reviewed by James Lovegrove, in the Financial Times, and was included in his 2019 best picture book list.

It was shortlisted for the 2020 British Book Awards Non-Fiction Lifestyle Book of the Year, is the 2019 Barnes & Noble Book of the Year, and won the 2019 Waterstones Book of the Year.

== Animated adaptation ==
In October 2022, it was announced that the book was being adapted as an animated short film, directed by Peter Baynton and Mackesy, story adapted by Jon Croker and Mackesy, co-produced by Cara Speller, J. J. Abrams, and Hannah Minghella. The film was co-executive produced by Woody Harrelson with Jude Coward Nicoll voicing the boy, Tom Hollander as the mole, Idris Elba as the fox, and Gabriel Byrne as the horse. Isobel Waller-Bridge composed the short's soundtrack. The short aired on BBC One and streamed on iPlayer on 24 December 2022. Additionally it premiered on Apple TV+ as an Apple Original Film on 25 December 2022 outside the United Kingdom. The film won the Best Animated Short Film Academy Award on 12 March 2023.

== In popular culture ==
In 2022 the BBC made a documentary about Mackesy, the book, and the making of the film, titled "Charlie Mackesy: The Boy, the Mole, the Fox, the Horse and Me". It featured contributions from Bear Grylls, a childhood friend of Mackesy.

== Sequel/Continuation ==
In October 2025 a new book was released: Always Remember: The Boy, the Mole, the Fox, the Horse and the Storm (2025). This continued the story of the four main characters from the first book. The book was highly acclaimed and quickly became a bestseller in a number of countries.
