= Blush (2021 film) =

Animated short film from Skydance Animation

- Official poster
- Directed by: Joe Mateo
- Written by: Joe Mateo
- Produced by: Heather Schmidt Feng Yanu
- Edited by: Tim Mertens
- Music by: Joy Ngiaw
- Production companies: Apple Studios; Skydance Animation
- Distributed by: Apple TV+
- Release date: October 1, 2021
- Running time: 10 minutes
- Country: United States
- Language: English

Blush is a 2021 American animated science fiction short film inspired by a true story from writer and director Joe Mateo, produced by Heather Schmidt Feng Yanu and executive produced by John Lasseter, David Ellison and Dana Goldberg. Developed from Skydance Animation, the short film follows an astronaut falling in love with an alien on a small planet. The film was dedicated to the memory of Mary Ann R. Mateo who died from breast cancer. It was released on Apple TV+ on October 1, 2021.

== Plot ==
The short film opens with an unnamed astronaut maintaining a garden in his spaceship. His unattended spaceship collides with a meteor and crashes into a small barren rock planet. The astronaut attempts to contact earth but fails. Then, he removes the plants from his spaceship garden and plants them on the planet, but they wither due to lack of air and water. He later witnesses another spaceship crash into the planet. Upon inspection he finds it empty, but notices footprints, which makes him believe there was someone on the ship. He follows the footprints back to his spaceship, where he finds his plant suddenly growing into a large tree, and at the base of it he notices a pinkish female alien with ribbon hair making the tree grow. The alien runs to his ship and brings out the other plants from the spaceship, and plants them into the planet's soil, making most of into it a large garden. They fall in love at first sight. When the alien removes the astronaut's helmet, he nearly dies from asphyxia, only to find the alien has made air for him to breathe.

Some time later, the small planet is now a lively green planet, with an atmosphere, a body of water, vegetation, trees, clouds etc. As the astronaut spends time with her, he teaches her a few things, like eating mangos. As the years goes by, the couple develop their relationship and are seen having two daughters who have their parents' traits (the older girl with her mother's hair color but fine strands like her father, and a younger girl with her father's hair color but having her mother's ribbon hair).

The alien later is seen becoming weak, to the point where she can no longer eat and/or walk. As a result, the planet slowly begins to wither and she eventually dies in the astronaut's arms in a sparkling aurora, at which time the astronaut starts to experience asphyxia again. However, he wakes to find his daughters are able to give him air like their mother, causing him to be able to breathe again, and also share their mother's power to revive the planet in an instant.

During the post-credits scenes, as he is sleeping with his daughters and a pet alien dog under a tree, the astronaut witnesses another spaceship crashing into the planet. Curious, he and his daughters go to check the ship only to discover something that makes him blush.

== Production ==
=== Development ===
The idea for the film came from story artist Joe Mateo who lost his wife Mary Ann four and a half years ago to breast cancer. Suffering from a panic attack, his daughters symbolized his air. The film was announced later on as Skydance Animation's first production/project to debut with Apple Studios distributing it, making it the first Skydance film to be from Apple TV+. On October 1, 2021, Skydance Animation released its first short film inspired by a true story from director Joe Mateo called Blush. It was released on Apple TV+ as part of their multi-year deal.

=== Animation ===
Following the purchase of Ilion Animation Studios from Skydance, animation was provided by Skydance Animation Madrid and was also made in Los Angeles. Production was done remotely during the COVID-19 pandemic.

=== Music ===
The score is provided by Chinese-Malaysian film composer Joy Ngiaw who makes her first musical debut into scoring an animation short film.

== Reception ==
=== Critical response ===
Female First gave it a positive review over the short film and its ending.

=== Accolades ===
Award	Date of Ceremony	Category	Recipient(s)	Result
Hollywood Music in Media Awards	November 17, 2021	Original Score — Short Animated Film (Blush)	Joy Ngiaw	Won
Music + Sound Awards	2022	Original Score — Short Animated Film (Blush)	Joy Ngiaw, Joe Mateo	Won
Hollywood Critics Association Film Awards	February 28, 2022	Best Short Film	Blush	Nominated
Annie Awards	March 12, 2022	Outstanding Achievement for Music in an Animated Television/Broadcast Production	Joy Ngiaw	Nominated
