= The Search for WondLa =

2010 children's novel by Tony DiTerlizzi

- First edition cover
- Author: Tony DiTerlizzi
- Illustrator: Tony DiTerlizzi
- Cover artist: Tony DiTerlizzi
- Language: English
- Series: The WondLa Trilogy
- Genre: Science fiction
- Publisher: Simon & Schuster
- Publication date: 21 Sept 2010
- Publication place: United States
- Media type: Print
- Pages: 496 pp
- ISBN: 978-1-4169-8310-1
- Followed by: A Hero for WondLa

The Search for WondLa is a children's science fiction fantasy novel by Tony DiTerlizzi published in 2010. It is the first book of the WondLa series. The website dedicated to the book had an innovative section which interacts with the book's illustrations via webcam.

== Description from the book ==
Eva Nine had never seen the actual sun before, or walked outdoors. In fact, she had never even seen another living person in all twelve years of her life. That changes when a marauding huntsman destroys her underground home and sends her fleeing for her life. She is desperate to find someone else who is like her, and a single clue gives her hope: a crumbling picture of a girl, a robot, an adult and the word "WondLa".

== Plot summary ==
Eva Nine has reached the age of 12 living her whole life in an underground Sanctuary. She has been raised by a robot named "Muthr" (Multi-Utility Task Help Robot zero-six), and knows only of the outside world through holograms and a small piece of cardboard inscribed with the fragmented words "Wond" and "La." When the facility is attacked by a large creature named Besteel, she is forced to leave Muthr behind and flee her home. Upon seeing the outside world for the first time she remarks that it is nothing like the holographic simulations she had been brought up on, encountering many dangerous and alien species of plants and animals that her Omnipod device fails to identify.

After another encounter with Besteel and meeting an alien named Rovender Kitt and a large behemoth Otto (identified as a giant water bear by the Omnipod), Eva reunites with Muthr in her (now demolished) home and convinces the Sanctuary computer to allow the robot to escort her to the next underground Sanctuary. When they find it abandoned they convince Rovender to lead them to the royal city of Solas.

The group has several more encounters with Besteel and other aliens, in which Eva is nearly embalmed for display at the royal museum. While in the museum she learns that the life forms of this planet (called "Orbona" by its natives) arrived long ago on a dead world that they "reawakened" for their use. She also discovers many ancient human artifacts and learns of a ruined human civilization beyond a dangerous desert.

Eva, Muthr, Rovender, and Otto cross the desert to discover the remains of an ancient human city buried under the sands. Besteel soon arrives and attacks, severely damaging Muthr. Eva then uses her Omnipod to attract several deadly Sand Snipers that kill Besteel and drag him beneath the sand. Muthr, unable to be repaired, dies shortly afterward, and when the remaining characters tunnel into one of the buried buildings they discover that it was once the New York Public Library, meaning Orbona was once Earth. The still-functioning library computer identifies the cardboard "WondLa" as the cover of The Wonderful Wizard of Oz, by L. Frank Baum. This leads her to the conclusion that Earth died and was reawakened as Orbona.

In the epilogue, a human boy named Hailey swoops down from the sky in an airship called the Bijou and informs Eva that he is there to take her home.

== Sequels ==
In the front description of the book, it is stated that "The Search is just the beginning" and that The Search for WondLa is the start of a trilogy.

The second book, A Hero for WondLa, was published on May 8, 2012. In it, Eva Nine, finally finding other humans, is thrilled when she and her friends are rescued by a human boy named Hailey Turner and taken to New Attica (possibly a rebuilt version of Attica, New York), a seemingly peaceful human colony. However, the idyllic facade soon crumbles as Eva discovers Cadmus Pryde’s duplicity and his control over the city through technology, dictating every aspect of life and imprisoning aliens. Eva reunites with her sister, Eva Eight, and together they rescue their alien friends from prison. Realizing Cadmus's plan to eradicate all alien life and dominate Orbona, Eva Nine decides to fight for her dream of peaceful coexistence, ultimately rallying with other alien cities to oppose Cadmus and his forces.

The final book is The Battle for WondLa (2014). Eva Nine hides to avoid leading the villainous Loroc to her companions, but when the city of Solas is captured by Cadmus Pryde, she is forced back into action. With both Cadmus and Loroc vying for control over Orbona, Eva, now attuned to nature's voices, seeks old allies and uncovers hard truths to prevent a repeat of Earth's destruction. Loroc, manipulating Cadmus and Queen Ojo into conflict, consumes his siblings to gain their powers, aiming to either enslave or consume all life on Orbona under the guise of unity. Eva uses Orbona's creatures to fight Loroc, ultimately tricking him into eating himself to death by making him believe his devoured siblings are still alive inside him. The story concludes with Eva and Hailey together.

== Adaptation ==
In February 2021, it was announced that Apple Studios, in partnership with Skydance Animation, was creating a television adaptation of The Search for WondLa to stream on Apple TV+. It was originally set to be written and executive produced by showrunner Lauren Montgomery with Chad Quant, Tony DiTerlizzi and Skydance Animation head John Lasseter attached as executive producers. Montgomery has since left the project and has been replaced by Bobs Gannaway, one of Lasseter's Disney-era colleagues. Lasseter's son, short-film director Bennett Lasseter, was brought on as a consultant on the show. The series was scheduled to debut in 2023 with new editions of the books in hardcovers and paperback by September but was delayed to 2024. It stars Jeanine Mason, Teri Hatcher, Gary Anthony Williams, Brad Garrett, Chiké Okonkwo, Alan Tudyk and D. C. Douglas. The series was released on Apple TV+ on June 28, 2024.
