= Charlie Mackesy =

British artist and illustrator (born 1962)

Charlie Mackesy OBE
- Born: Charles Piers Mackesy; 11 December 1962 (age 63); Northumberland, England
- Occupations: Author, painter, illustrator
- Notable work: The Boy, the Mole, the Fox and the Horse (2019), Always Remember: The Boy, the Mole, the Fox, the Horse and the Storm (2025)
- Relatives: Pierse Joseph Mackesy (grandfather); Piers Mackesy (uncle); Serena Mackesy (cousin)
- Awards: Nielsen Bestseller Awards (2020); Academy Award for Best Animated Short Film (2023); BAFTA Award for Best Short Animation (2023); OBE (2024)

Charles Piers Mackesy OBE (born 11 December 1962) is a British artist, illustrator, and filmmaker. He is the author of The Boy, the Mole, the Fox and the Horse (2019) and its sequel/continuation Always Remember: The Boy, the Mole, the Fox, the Horse and the Storm (2025). Mackesy co-wrote and co-directed the 2022 animated short film adaptation of his book, which won the BAFTA Award for Best Short Animation and the Academy Award for Best Animated Short Film in 2023. He was appointed an Officer of the Order of the British Empire (OBE) in the 2024 New Year Honours for services to art and literature.

== Early life and education ==
Mackesy was born and grew up in Northumberland in the north of England His father, Anthony Mackesy, was a naval architect of Irish origin, with family roots in County Wicklow, and his mother, Elizabeth Jane Mackesy was a gardener and seamstress. Growing up among rural farming communities, he developed an interest in animals and wildlife. He began drawing horses at the age of six. He was sent to a boarding school at the age of seven, and at 16, he approached the staff of a local state school and arranged to continue his education there. He was educated at Radley College and Queen Elizabeth High School, Hexham. He also briefly attended university twice, but left on both occasions within a week. He briefly attended art college, leaving after a week. He has an elder sister, Sara, with whom he stayed after moving to London.

After his schooling, Mackesy worked in farming. The death of his close friend Jamie in a car accident during his late teens prompted him to devote more time to drawing. He is a self-taught artist, though he spent three months studying anatomy with a portrait painter in the United States in the early 1990s.

Mackesy’s paternal grandparents were Major General Pierse Joseph Mackesy and writer Leonora Mackesy (born 1902), who wrote Harlequin romances as Leonora Starr and Dorothy Rivers.

== Career ==
The Return of the Prodigal Son themed sculpture by Charlie Mackesy, 2005.

Mackesy began his career as a cartoonist for The Spectator, before becoming a book illustrator for Oxford University Press. He also worked with Richard Curtis on the set of Love Actually to create a set of drawings to be auctioned for Comic Relief, a charity. He has continued to work with the organization which he loves. He was selected to work on Nelson Mandela's Unity Series project, a lithograph project working together with Mandela on the drawings he made.

Mackesy's bronzes can be found in public spaces in London, including Highgate Cemetery and the Brompton Road. His paintings have been exhibited widely, most frequently with galleries in London and New York.

His work has been featured in books, private collections, galleries, magazine covers, street lamp posts, school classrooms, cafés, women's safe houses, churches, prisons, hospital wards, and countless other public spaces around the world. He was contacted by an editor who had seen his drawings on Instagram and then published with her on Ebury Press.

The Boy, the Mole, the Fox and the Horse was first published in October 2019, and has been on the Sunday Times Bestsellers List top ten for over 100 weeks; it is the longest Sunday Times Hardback Number One of all time. His book was selected as the Waterstones Book of the Year 2019 and the Barnes & Noble Book of the Year 2019 (the first ever book to be awarded both in the same year) and was shortlisted for the British Book Awards in 2020.

Mackesy was amongst the winners of the 2020 Nielsen Bestseller Awards, with The Boy, the Mole, the Fox and the Horse achieving Platinum status. All titles that achieve Platinum status are inducted into the "21st century Hall of Fame", the Hall of Fame includes 149 titles. In 2020, eight books passed the Platinum Award million-copy sales threshold. Mackesy was awarded Maddox Gallery Artist of the Year at the GQ Men of the Year Awards in 2020 and Illustrator of the Year at the British Book Awards in 2021. Mackesy co-directed and co-wrote the animated short film based on the book. In March 2023, Mackesy and Matthew Freud won the Oscar for Animated Short Film for The Boy, the Mole, the Fox and the Horse. The film also won the BAFTA Award for Best Short Animation.

In 2022 the BBC made a documentary about Mackesy, the book and the making of the film, titled Charlie Mackesy: The Boy, the Mole, the Fox, the Horse and Me. It featured contributions from Bear Grylls, a childhood friend of Mackesy; Richard Curtis, Oprah Winfrey, J. J. Abrams, and Tom Hollander.

Mackesy was appointed an Officer of the Order of the British Empire (OBE) in the 2024 New Year Honours for services to art and literature.

On 9 October 2025, Mackesy published Always Remember: The Boy, the Mole, the Fox, the Horse and the Storm, a sequel to his 2019 book It topped the UK bestseller chart in its first week of publication. It became the UK's Christmas number-one bestseller in December 2025, having sold 365,000 copies since its publication.

== Personal life ==
Mackesy has lived and painted in South Africa, Sub-Saharan Africa, and the United States. He now lives between Brixton, South London, and Suffolk. Away from art, he is an ambassador for Mama Buci, a beekeeping social enterprise in Zambia, and has helped to run a homeless project in London.

== Bibliography ==
- The Boy, the Mole, the Fox and the Horse. Ebury Press, 2019. ISBN 978-1-5291-0510-0.
- The Boy, the Mole, the Fox and the Horse: The Animated Story. Ebury Press, 2022. ISBN 978-1-5291-9768-6.
- Always Remember: The Boy, the Mole, the Fox, the Horse and the Storm. Ebury Press, 2025. ISBN 978-1-5291-0844-6.
