= Isobel Waller-Bridge =

English composer (born 1984)

- Born: Isobel Noeline Waller-Bridge; 23 April 1984 (age 42); Hammersmith, London England
- Education: Royal Academy of Music (ArtDip); King's College London (MMus); University of Edinburgh (BMus)
- Occupation: Composer
- Relatives: Phoebe Waller-Bridge (sister); Michelle Dockery (sister-in-law)
- Website: isobelwaller-bridge.com

External image
- Isobel Waller-Bridge IMDb photo

Isobel Noeline Waller-Bridge (born 23 April 1984) is an English composer who is known for her scores for film, television, and theatre, along with her works for electronic music and contemporary classical music.

== Early life and education ==
Born Isobel Noeline Waller-Bridge on 23 April 1984, she is the daughter of Theresa Mary Waller-Bridge (née Clerke), an employee of the Worshipful Company of Ironmongers, and Michael Cyprian Waller-Bridge, founder of the electronic trading platform Tradepoint. She has two younger siblings: Jasper and Phoebe. The family from which Waller-Bridge descends were landed gentry of Cuckfield, Sussex. On her father's side, she is a descendant of the Revd Sir Egerton Leigh, 2nd Baronet, and a distant relative of politician and author Egerton Leigh; her maternal grandfather was Sir John Edward Longueville Clerke, 12th baronet, of Hitcham, Buckinghamshire.

Waller-Bridge earned an bachelor's degree in music from Edinburgh University, and a master's degree from King's College London. She was also awarded a scholarship from the Royal Academy of Music, where she received another diploma.

== Career ==
Waller-Bridge composed the soundtrack for the BBC comedy-drama series Fleabag (2016–2019), which was written by and starred her sister, Phoebe Waller-Bridge. She also wrote the score for the feature films Vita and Virginia (2018) and Emma (2020). In 2021, she scored Netflix's Munich: The Edge of War, which was released by Milan Records/Sony Music, and The Phantom of the Open.

Waller-Bridge is also a performer, playing in venues such as the St James Theatre and Union Chapel. In 2016, her music appeared on albums with the Icelandic composers Ólafur Arnalds and Jóhann Jóhannsson. In 2021, she was commissioned by the Philharmonia Orchestra to write music for their Human/Nature series. Her piece, Temperatures, was premiered in November 2021, conducted by Pekka Kuusisto at the Royal Festival Hall. In 2020, she was commissioned by Sarah Burton to score Alexander McQueen’s Spring/Summer 2020 collection at Paris Fashion Week. In 2021, she collaborated with ballet dancer and actress Francesca Hayward to score her dance film, Siren.

For theatre, Waller-Bridge worked on Florian Zeller's The Son (West End) and The Forest (Hampstead Theatre), Woyzeck, adapted by Jack Thorne (Old Vic), Blood Wedding (Young Vic), and Knives in Hens (Donmar Warehouse).

In June 2022, it was announced that Waller-Bridge would be providing an original score for an animated short film of The Boy, the Mole, the Fox and the Horse, which aired on BBC One at Christmas 2022. She produced the soundtrack to Sweetpea in 2024

== Personal life ==
Michelle Dockery is Waller-Bridge's sister-in-law.

== Works ==
- Music for Strings (2013)

=== Television ===
- Life (2009 documentary series, four episodes)
- War & Peace (2016 TV series)
- Fleabag (2016–2019)
- Vanity Fair (2018 TV series)
- The Split (2018 TV series)
- The ABC Murders (2018 TV series)
- Black Mirror (2019, episode "Rachel, Jack and Ashley Too")
- The Way Down (2021)
- Roar (2022)
- Sweetpea (2024)
- Towards Zero (2025 TV series)
- The Miniature Wife (2026 TV series)

=== Film ===
- Vita and Virginia (2018)
- Emma (2020)
- Munich – The Edge of War (2021)
- The Phantom of the Open (2021)
- I Came By (2022)
- The Boy, the Mole, the Fox and the Horse (2022; short film)
- The Lesson (2023)
- Wicked Little Letters (2023)
- Magpie (2024)
- Mother Mother (2024)

=== Arms ===
Coat of arms of the Waller-Bridges
Notes Royal Licence granted in May 1913 Crest 1st, on a wreath of the colours an eagle rising holding in the beak a sprig of laurel Proper (Bridge); 2. on a wreath of the colours, three mascles Or, in front of a walnut-tree Proper (Waller). Escutcheon Quarterly, 1st and 4th: Azure, issuant from the centre of a bar wavy of water Proper in the nombril point a bridge of three arches embattled Argent, masoned Sable, the whole between as many sea lions each crowned with a naval coronet Or (Bridge); 2nd and 3rd: Azure, between two bendlets Or, three walnut-leaves Argent, the whole between two fleur-de-lys of the Last (Waller). Motto Me juvat ire per altum
