= David Ellison =

American film producer and media proprietor (born 1983)

- Born: January 9, 1983 (age 43); Santa Clara County, California, U.S.
- Education: University of Southern California (no degree)
- Occupations: Filmmaker; media proprietor; actor
- Years active: 2005–present
- Title: Chairman and co-CEO of Skydance
- Spouse: Sandra Lynn Modic (m. 2011)
- Children: 2
- Father: Larry Ellison
- Relatives: Megan Ellison (sister)

David Ferris Ellison (born January 9, 1983) is an American filmmaker, media proprietor, and the chairman, founder, and chief executive officer (CEO) of the mass media and entertainment conglomerate Skydance. Initially an actor, he founded the film and television production company Skydance Media in 2006 and later merged it with the media company Paramount Global, forming Paramount Skydance in 2025. Paramount Skydance later acquired all assets of Warner Bros. Discovery in 2026, and the company was renamed as Skydance. He is the son of Oracle Corporation co-founder Larry Ellison.

Ellison founded Skydance and was its CEO from 2006 until 2025, and produced the films Terminator Genisys, Mission: Impossible – Rogue Nation (both 2015), Life (2017), and Top Gun: Maverick (2022), with the latter nominated for the Academy Award for Best Picture.

In 2025, under Ellison's leadership, Skydance acquired the media company Paramount Global. An ally of President Donald Trump, Ellison hand-picked political commentator Bari Weiss as editor-in-chief of CBS News and acquired her digital news outlet The Free Press after the second Trump administration approved the merger of Skydance and Paramount Global in 2025. Shortly after the completion of the merger, Ellison launched a successful hostile takeover bid for Warner Bros. Discovery, with the acquisition being completed in October 2026.

== Early life ==
Ellison was born on January 9, 1983, in Santa Clara County, California. He is the son of billionaire Oracle Corporation co-founder and chairman Larry Ellison and his third wife, Barbara Boothe Ellison. His father is of Italian and Jewish heritage. Ellison grew up in Woodside, California, with his mother, who nurtured his love for film. His father was not a day-to-day presence in his early life, but when David Ellison turned 13, his father bought him his own Katana stunt plane, and they bonded piloting and doing stunts. He attended Pepperdine University and the University of Southern California (USC). He has one sister, film producer Megan Ellison, who founded Annapurna Pictures.

== Career ==
Ellison's career started in acting, and in 2005 he dropped out of USC film school to act in his first major film, Flyboys. His father heavily financed the film. It was widely considered a failure. Ellison also acted in Hole in One and Little Fish, Strange Pond before giving up his acting ambitions and going into the business side of the entertainment industry.

=== Skydance Media, LLC ===
Ellison was influenced by businessman Steve Jobs, a friend of his father, and pitched Jobs his idea for Skydance Media, before revising his idea based on Jobs' advice. His father invested heavily in the company and became the largest shareholder. The company's films included Mission: Impossible – Fallout, Annihilation, World War Z, True Grit, Jack Reacher, Star Trek Into Darkness, and Star Trek Beyond. Ellison was named to Variety's Dealmaker list for 2010 and the Forbes 30 Under 30 list in 2011. Ellison was nominated for the Academy Award for Best Picture for co-producing Top Gun: Maverick. Skydance Media expanded in 2013 with the launch of its television division. He executive-produced shows such as Altered Carbon and Grace and Frankie. In 2014, Ellison launched a line of men's clothing, the "LANAI Collection".

In 2017, Ellison helped launch Skydance Animation in partnership with Spain's Ilion Animation Studios. In 2019, Ellison hired former Pixar and Walt Disney Animation Studios chief creative officer John Lasseter to run Skydance Animation.

=== Paramount Skydance Corporation ===
In January 2024, it was reported that Ellison was interested in merging Skydance Media with Paramount Global and buying the latter's parent company National Amusements from Shari Redstone. The US$8 billion deal relied heavily on a personal $6 billion investment by Ellison's father, Larry Ellison. The merger received approval from the Federal Communications Commission (FCC) under the second Donald Trump administration in July 2025. The merger was completed by August 7, 2025, and Paramount Skydance Corporation was formed. Ellison is chairman and CEO of the merged company.

Following the merger, the company made changes to CBS News which Le Monde called "conservative-friendly". The company bought Bari Weiss's news outlet The Free Press, and Ellison appointed Weiss as CBS News' editor-in-chief. Many sources have characterized Weiss as conservative leaning despite her denying this label. To critics, the appointment was seen as an effort to steer CBS in a direction more aligned with the administration of President Donald Trump. Shortly into her tenure, Weiss controversially delayed the airing of a 60 Minutes story on the Trump administration's deportations to Venezuela. The report aired the following month with only minor additional context.

=== Acquisition of Warner Bros. Discovery ===
In September 2025, shortly after the formation of Paramount Skydance, it was reported that Ellison had started preparing a bid for Warner Bros. Discovery (WBD). Following an auction process in December 2025, WBD entered into a merger agreement with Netflix, but Ellison sought to hinder the merger by launching a hostile takeover bid. The Wall Street Journal reported in December 2025 that Ellison had given assurances to President Donald Trump that if Paramount were to buy WBD, he would make major changes to CNN, a media organization that Trump has frequently criticized. Ellison worked with three sovereign wealth funds owned by Middle-Eastern governments, as well as Trump's son-in-law Jared Kushner, to finance his competing bid for WBD. As with the Paramount merger, Ellison's father, Larry Ellison, also played a significant role in the takeover of WBD, putting up $40.4 billion in equity financing as a personal guarantee. Defying historical precedent of non-involvement in mergers, Donald Trump personally involved himself in the merger evaluation. In February 2026, after Ellison raised his bid for the company, WBD concluded that it was a superior proposal to the Netflix deal. Netflix declined to raise its bid for the company and Paramount and WBD signed a definitive merger agreement shortly after, subject to approval by federal regulators. Ellison would continue his tenure as chairman and CEO of the combined company.

In April 2026, Ellison feted Donald Trump and senior Trump administration officials at an event titled, "honoring the Trump White House," in Washington D.C., alongside top executives and journalists from CBS News. Guests at the event included federal regulators who were overseeing the merger. On June 12, 2026, the U.S. Justice Department's Antitrust Division approved Paramount's $111 billion acquisition of WBD.

Paramount's attempt to acquire Warner Bros. Discovery faced antitrust challenges from a group of state attorneys general, which delayed the acquisition. The delay could add significant costs to the $110 billion deal. However, on September 21, 2026, Paramount ultimately settled with the state attorneys general, clearing the path for Paramount to complete the acquisition. The deal was closed on October 6, 2026, and Paramount Skydance changed its legal name to Skydance Corporation.

== Personal life ==
Ellison married Sandra Lynn Modic, an actress and singer, on October 1, 2011, in Palm Springs, California. They have two children.

Ellison is a licensed pilot with instrument ratings for helicopter aviation, aerobatics, commercial aviation, fixed-wing aircraft, and multi-engine aircraft. In 2003, aged 20, he was selected to perform as part of Sean D. Tucker's "Stars of Tomorrow" aerobatic team at the Experimental Aircraft Association (EAA) AirVenture Oshkosh.

Ellison and his father are close associates of Israeli prime minister Benjamin Netanyahu. His father's first wife has described Larry as "an ardent Zionist" and Larry hosted Netanyahu on his Hawaiian island in 2021. Ellison once joined his father on a trip to Israel, posting a photo on Instagram from a dinner with Netanyahu where Ellison said he was "very grateful for everything [Netanyahu] has done and continues to do for the nation of Israel." After the October 7th attacks, Ellison declared that "Skydance stands with Israel."

Ellison is a member of the Producers Guild of America and Television Academy.

== Controversy ==
David Ellison has faced a ton of controvery, most notably being his appointment of Bari Weiss for editor-in-chief at CBS News, who has been accused by several “60 Minutes” correspondents of meddling with their reports and has steered the newsrooms coverage to be more favourable to the Trump Administration. He has also has a tendency to hiring controversial figures such as Jeff Shell, John Lasseter and Max Landis, who were all previously accused of sexual misconduct and has also hired and courted former Mattel CEO: Ynon Kreiz to become Co-CEO of Skydance (company) who has faced backlash for failing to capitalize on Barbie (film)'s success with the Toy-makers sales declining over the years with the companies stock trending downwards. One Mattel Veteran said "He was great at cutting costs—But there was zero innovation". “The CEO once cheered for expanding the company’s margins into double digits with a strong long-term strategy walks away with the stock roughly where it was when he took office,” said Zachary Warring, an analyst at CFRA Research. Kriez has also been a staunch ally of Israel

Ellison also faces controversy for the ousting of DC Studios: Co-CEOs James Gunn and Peter Safran, where he reassurred the pair that their jobs were safe before ultimately ousting them as heads of DC. Ellison had privately been planning the pairs ouster, courting Former Marvel Studios veteran: Jeremy Latcham, to spearhead the franchise.

== Political views ==
Ellison used to be a Democratic donor and said in 2022 that he is a "socially liberal person". He had a "good relationship" with former president of the United States, Joe Biden, and had donated $929,600 to his re-election campaign in 2024. But since 2025, Ellison has been described as an ally of current US president, Donald Trump. President Trump has also mentioned his connection to Ellison and his father as being a positive one. Ellison was the guest of Republican Senator Lindsey Graham at Trump's 2026 state of the union address. After the merger between Paramount and Warner Bros. Discovery (WBD) in 2026, Ellison encouraged non-partisan dialogue, stating that it is "important to talk to everybody on both sides of the political aisle", and confirmed his support for CNN's lawsuit against the Trump administration for banning CNN, MS NOW and Politico from entering the White House. Reiterating the reassurances he had made earlier that year while seeking to buy WBD, Ellison also said that the newly formed company, Skydance, is "going to make sure that CNN and CBS News are completely editorially independent."

== Filmography ==
=== Film ===
Executive producer

- Flyboys (2006)
- True Grit (2010)
- Mission: Impossible – Ghost Protocol (2011)
- The Guilt Trip (2012)
- Jack Reacher (2012)
- G.I. Joe: Retaliation (2013)
- Star Trek Into Darkness (2013)
- World War Z (2013)
- Jack Ryan: Shadow Recruit (2014)
- Star Trek Beyond (2016)
- Jack Reacher: Never Go Back (2016)
- Baywatch (2017)
- Annihilation (2018)
- Mission: Impossible – Fallout (2018)
- Without Remorse (2021)
- Snake Eyes (2021)
- Blush (2021)
- Transformers: Rise of the Beasts (2023)
- Mission: Impossible – Dead Reckoning Part One (2023)
- Mission: Impossible – The Final Reckoning (2025)

Producer

- Terminator Genisys (2015)
- Mission: Impossible – Rogue Nation (2015)
- Life (2017)
- Geostorm (2017)
- Gemini Man (2019)
- Terminator: Dark Fate (2019)
- 6 Underground (2019)
- The Old Guard (2020)
- The Tomorrow War (2021)
- The Adam Project (2022)
- Top Gun: Maverick (2022)
- Luck (2022)
- The Greatest Beer Run Ever (2022)
- Air (2023)
- Ghosted (2023)
- Kelce (2023)
- Heart of Stone (2023)
- Spy Kids: Armageddon (2023)
- Spellbound (2024)
- The Gorge (2025)
- The Old Guard 2 (2025)
- Fountain of Youth (2025)
- The Family Plan 2 (2025)
- Swapped (2026)
- Mayday (2026)
- Matchbox: The Movie (2026)
- Way of the Warrior Kid (2026)
- Ray Gunn (2026)
- Untitled Jack and the Beanstalk project (TBA)
- Untitled Skydance Animation/Don Hall project (TBA)

Actor

| Year | Title | Role | Notes |
|---|---|---|---|
| 2005 | The Chumscrubber | Student #1 | |
| 2005 | When All Else Fails | Mike Williams | Short film |
| 2006 | Flyboys | Eddie Beagle | |
| 2009 | Hole in One | Tyler Hayden | |
| 2009 | Little Fish, Strange Pond | Romeo | Direct-to-video |

Director/Writer

- When All Else Fails (2005) (Short film)

Special thanks

- Phantom (2013)

=== Television ===
Executive producer

- Manhattan (2014−2015)
- Ten Days in the Valley (2017)
- Grace and Frankie (2015−2018)
- Dietland (2018)
- Condor (2018–2020)
- Altered Carbon (2018−2019)
- Jack Ryan (2018−2023)
- Foundation (2021–present)
- Reacher (2022–present)
- Good Rivals (2022)
- The Checkup with Dr. David Agus (2022)
- The Big Door Prize (2023)
- FUBAR (2023)
- WondLa (2024)
- Terminator Zero (2024)
- One Night in Idaho: The College Murders (2025)
- Ride or Die (2026)
- Neuromancer (2027)

Actor

| Year | Title | Role | Notes |
|---|---|---|---|
| 2008 | Blank Slate | Blake Feltzer | Television film |
| 2010 | Leverage | Ballard | |
