= Nathan Greno =

American film director (born 1975)

- Born: March 22, 1975 (age 51); Kenosha, Wisconsin, U.S.
- Education: Columbus College of Art and Design
- Occupations: Film director; story artist; writer
- Employers: Walt Disney Animation Studios (1998–2018); Skydance Animation (2018–present)
- Notable work: Tangled; Swapped

Nathan Greno (born March 22, 1975) is an American film director, story artist, and writer. He is best known for directing Walt Disney Animation Studios' Tangled (2010) and Skydance Animation's Swapped (2026).

== Career ==
Inspired by Disney films since the first grade, Greno started as a young boy writing and drawing comic books and strips. In 1996, during his junior year at Columbus College of Art and Design, he was hired by Walt Disney Feature Animation. He started there as an animation clean-up artist on Mulan (1998). Being creatively unfulfilled, he switched to story development. He then contributed as a story artist on Brother Bear (2003), wrote a screenplay and worked as a story artist on Meet the Robinsons (2007), and supervised the story on Bolt (2008). With the short film Super Rhino (2009), he made his directorial debut. In 2006, he took over a long-in-development project Tangled, based on the fairy tale Rapunzel and chose Byron Howard, with whom he had collaborated on Bolt and Super Rhino, as a directing partner. The film was released in 2010 to a great critical and financial reception, and was followed in 2012 by Greno and Howard-directed short film Tangled Ever After.

Greno was at one point set to direct an animated film titled Gigantic. Loosely based on the fairy tale of Jack and the Beanstalk, it was scheduled for a 2020 release. However, in October 2017, it was announced that the film had been shelved.

In February 2018, it was announced that Greno had signed a multi-year contract with Skydance Animation to write and direct an animated film titled Powerless, as well as consult on projects in development. Following retooling of the film's original "teenage superhero story" premise, Powerless was retitled Pookoo, then finally released in May 2026 under the title Swapped.

== Filmography ==
=== Films ===
Year	Film	Credited as							
Year	Film	Director	Writer	Head of Story	Creative Advisor	Story Artist	Other	Voice	Notes
1998	Mulan	No	No	No	No	No	Yes		Breakdown Animator: Mushu
2003	Brother Bear	No	No	No	No	Yes	No		
2005	Chicken Little	No	No	No	No	Additional	No		
2007	Meet the Robinsons	No	Yes	No	No	Yes	Yes	Lefty	
2008	Bolt	No	No	Yes	No	No	Yes	Additional Voices	
2009	The Princess and the Frog	No	No	No	No	No	No		Disney Story Trust - uncredited
2010	Tangled	Yes	No	No	No	No	Yes	Guard 1/Thug 1	Disney Story Trust - uncredited
2011	Winnie the Pooh	No	No	No	No	No	No		Disney Story Trust - uncredited
2012	Wreck-It Ralph	No	No	No	No	No	No		Disney Story Trust - uncredited
2013	Frozen	No	No	No	No	Additional	No		Disney Story Trust - uncredited
2014	Big Hero 6	No	No	No	Yes	No	Yes		Creative Leadership
2016	Zootopia	No	No	No	No	No	Yes		Creative Leadership
2016	Moana	No	No	No	No	No	Yes		Creative Leadership
2024	Spellbound	No	No	No	No	Additional	No		
2026	Swapped	Yes	Story	No	No	No	Yes	Root Snake 1	
2026	Ray Gunn	No	No	No	No	No	Yes		Creative Leadership

=== Shorts and TV specials ===
Year	Title	Director	Writer	Story Artist	Other	Voice
2000	John Henry	No	No	Yes	No	
2009	Super Rhino	Yes	Yes	No	No	
2009	Prep & Landing	No	No	No	Yes	Dasher
2012	Tangled Ever After	Yes	Yes	No	Yes	Guard/Maximus/Stabbington Brothers
2021	Blush	No	No	Yes	No	

=== Cancelled feature film projects ===
Cancelled Year of Release	Title	Director
2016, 2018, 2020	Gigantic	Yes
