= John Ratzenberger =

American actor (born 1947)

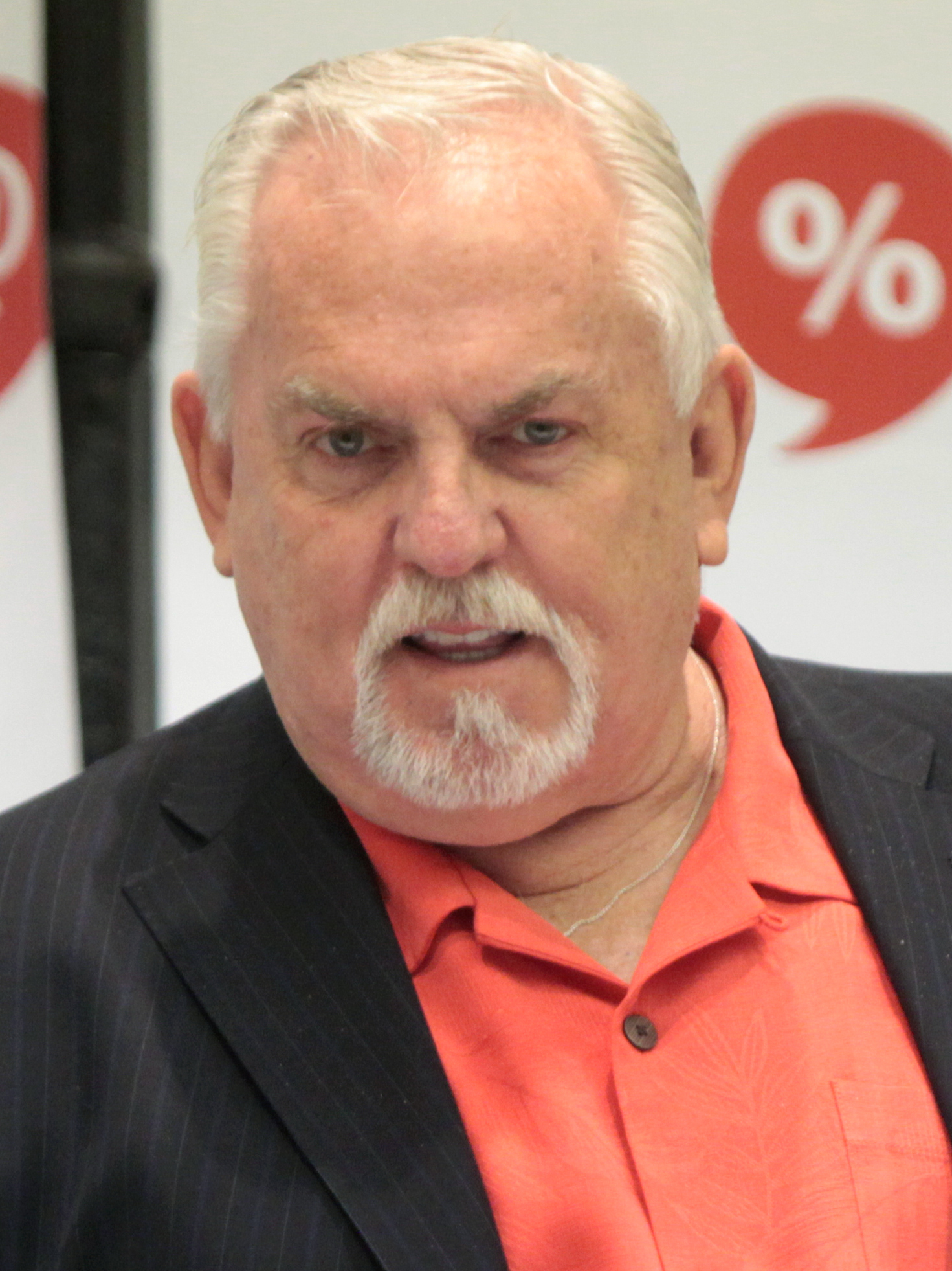
- Ratzenberger in 2016
- Born: John Dezso Ratzenberger; April 6, 1947 (age 79); Bridgeport, Connecticut, U.S.
- Education: Sacred Heart University
- Occupations: Actor; director
- Years active: 1973–present
- Agents: Saskia Delp-Kullock; Global Artists
- Political party: Republican
- Spouses: Caroline Ratzenberger (m. 1982; div. 1983); Georgia Stiny (m. 1984; div. 2004); Julie Blichfeldt (m. 2012)
- Children: 2
- Website: ratzenberger.com

John Dezso Ratzenberger (born April 6, 1947) is an American actor, widely known for his role as Cliff Clavin on the comedy series Cheers (1982–1993), for which he earned two Primetime Emmy nominations. Ratzenberger reprised the role in the short-lived spin-off The Tortellis, an episode of Wings, as well as in an episode of Frasier. He has voiced various characters in Pixar animated feature films including Hamm in the Toy Story franchise, Yeti the Abominable Snowman in the Monsters, Inc. franchise, The Underminer in The Incredibles franchise, Mack in the Cars franchise, Fritz in the Inside Out franchise, and many others.

Ratzenberger began his entertainment career while living in London in the 1970s. He acted in and wrote film and television through the 1970s and early 1980s before returning to America. At an audition for a role in a new sitcom, Ratzenberger created the character of Cliff Clavin. Cheers was a success and went on to run for 11 years. After Cheers, he began voicing characters for Pixar; his first role was Hamm in Pixar's debut feature film Toy Story (1995), and he would continue to voice characters in many subsequent Pixar films. Including voice acting and cameos, he is the fourth highest-grossing actor of all time.

== Early life and education ==
John Dezso Ratzenberger was born on Easter Sunday, April 6, 1947, in Bridgeport, Connecticut, the son of Bertha Veronica (née Grochowski), and Dezso Alexander Ratzenberger, a WWII veteran who had been a Combat Engineer in the Philippines. John's father, Dezso, was of Austrian and Hungarian descent, and John's mother was of Polish ancestry.

Ratzenberger attended St. Ann's School, Fairfield Prep, and Bassick High School in Bridgeport and then Sacred Heart University in Fairfield, Connecticut. In 1969, Ratzenberger worked at the Woodstock Festival as a heavy equipment operator and as part of the crew building the stage. He moved to London in 1971, where he began his acting, writing, and directing career.

== Career ==
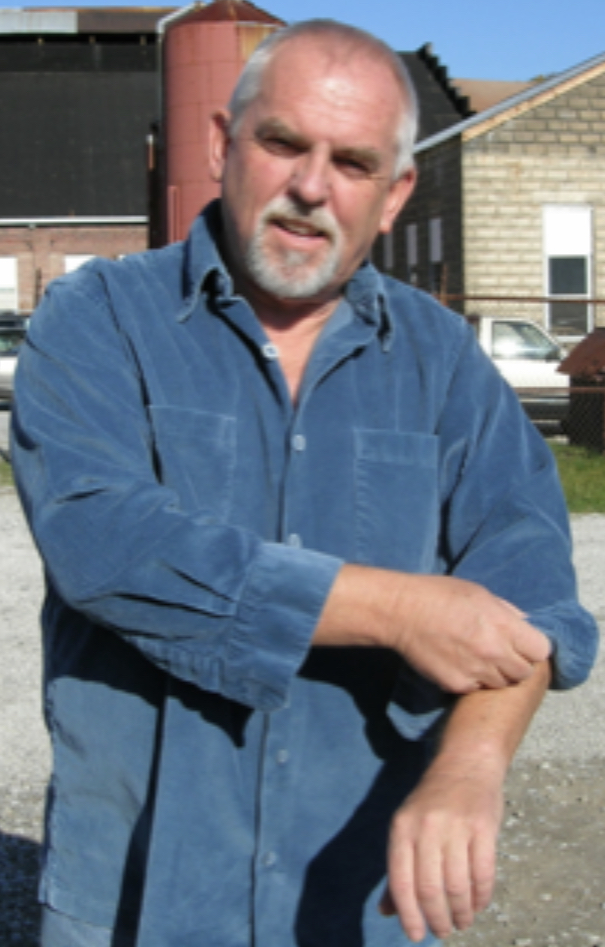
Ratzenberger on the set of the series "Made in America"

Ratzenberger began his career in the performing arts while living in London, England. Through the 1970s, he performed with Ray Hassett as the comedic theatrical duo Sal's Meat Market, which toured throughout Europe for eight years. Sal's Meat Market heavily influenced Peter Richardson and Nigel Planer as a duo in The Outer Limits and in The Comic Strip.

His first role in a major feature film was as a patron in Richard Lester's The Ritz (1976). Throughout the late 1970s and early 1980s, Ratzenberger appeared in various roles in feature films throughout Europe including: A Bridge Too Far, filmed in Holland, as a character based on Lieutenant James Megellas; Superman, as a missile controller; Superman II, as the NASA control man; Star Wars: The Empire Strikes Back as Major Derlin; Outland as a doomed mine worker named Tarlow; and Gandhi, filmed in India, playing an American lieutenant.

=== Cheers ===
Ratzenberger played mail carrier Cliff Clavin on the sitcom Cheers. As an improv artist, he asked the producers if they had written a bar know-it-all character; the producers decided it was a great idea, and the character of Cliff Clavin was born. Ratzenberger also came up with the idea for Cliff's trademark white socks, which he wore as a tribute to French comedian Jacques Tati. Cliff became known for his outlandish stories, trivia, and his trademarked (and oft-repeated) "It's a little known fact..." catchphrase. Cliff and Norm, the primary customer characters of the iconic bar, Cheers, played buddies who met at Cheers to talk about the day or nothing in particular. Ratzenberger was nominated for an Emmy Award for Outstanding Supporting Actor in a Comedy Series in 1985 and again in 1986. Ratzenberger provided the voice for an animated version of Cliff on The Simpsons sixth-season episode "Fear of Flying". He also played the role in the short-lived spin-off The Tortellis and in an episode of Wings, which was made by the same creators.

=== Voice work ===
Ratzenberger has contributed voice work for animated projects.

Ratzenberger has voiced characters in Pixar films. His roles include:

- Hamm the piggy bank in the Toy Story film series (1995, 1999, 2010, 2019, 2026)
- P.T. Flea, the Circus Ring Leader in A Bug's Life (1998)
- Yeti the Abominable Snowman in the Monsters, Inc. series (2001, 2013)
- The school of Moonfish in Finding Nemo (2003)
- The Underminer in The Incredibles series (2004, 2018)
- Mack the truck in the Cars series (2006, 2011, 2017)
- Mustafa the waiter in Ratatouille (2007)
- John the Axiom passenger in WALL-E (2008)
- Tom the construction worker in Up (2009)
- Gordon the Dunbroch palace guard in Brave (2012)
- Fritz the mind worker in the Inside Out series (2015, 2024)
- Earl the Velociraptor in The Good Dinosaur (2015)
- Bill the crab in Finding Dory (2016)
- Juan Ortodoncia the deceased dental patient in Coco (2017)
- Fennwick the cyclops construction worker in Onward (2020)

According to Ratzenberger, Pixar's tradition of including him as a good luck charm in every film beginning with the studio's first film, Toy Story, was due to him becoming good friends with former Pixar filmmaker John Lasseter, who directed or executive-produced each of the first 20 Pixar films. Ratzenberger's tenure at Pixar was parodied during the end credits of Cars, where his character, Mack, watches car-themed versions of Pixar films (Toy Car Story, Monster Trucks, Inc., and A Bug's Life, the latter of which references the Volkswagen Beetle). Mack notes that all the characters that John Ratzenberger has played had excellent voice actors until he realizes that they are performed by the same actor, at which point he remarks, "They're just using the same actor over and over," and asks, "What kind of a cut-rate production is this?!" The practice of regularly casting Ratzenberger in Pixar films was so well-known that his characters also occasionally shared the same voice actor in languages other than English, notably Renato Cecchetto who dubbed nearly all of Ratzenberger's Pixar roles for the Italian versions of the respective films. Ratzenberger has stated that his favorite Pixar roles were Hamm from the Toy Story series and P.T. Flea from A Bug's Life.

Following Lasseter's exit from Pixar, Ratzenberger revealed at Motor City Comic Con in May 2024 that he was not a fan of the regime that replaced Lasseter or the studio's subsequent films, claiming "[...] they suck", and was critical of the political messaging that he felt was being placed in the films. Pixar's 23rd feature film, Soul (2020), was the first Pixar film that did not involve Ratzenberger himself, though it featured a character animated in his likeness as a cameo according to the film's co-director Kemp Powers; the cameo was also confirmed by director Pete Docter on the film's audio commentary track. After voicing a character in each of Pixar's first 22 films, Toy Story (1995) through Onward (2020), Ratzenberger would not have another role in any Pixar film except for sequels in which he reprised roles he previously played such as Fritz in Inside Out 2 (2024) and Hamm in Toy Story 5 (2026). Ratzenberger would also reprise previous Pixar roles in new television series produced by Disney Television Animation rather than Pixar, including Yeti (now named Adorable) and a new character named Bernard in Monsters at Work (2021–24), and Mack in the upcoming Cars: Lightning Racers (2027).

Ratzenberger has also continued to work with Lasseter, who produces all feature films and executive-produces all series at Skydance Animation. Ratzenberger has appeared in every Skydance Animation feature film and series to date. His roles include:

- Rootie the tropical juice bar-owning bad luck root in Luck (2022)
- Caruncle the alien shopowner in WondLa (2024, 2025)
- Milo the monster handler in Spellbound (2024)
- An elder Javan bird in Swapped (2026)
- An undisclosed role in Ray Gunn (2026)

Aside from Pixar and Skydance animated productions, Ratzenberger voiced Harland the jet tug in Disneytoon Studios' Planes (2013), and Brodi the plane in its sequel, Planes: Fire & Rescue (2014), which are spin-offs of Pixar's Cars series and executive-produced by Lasseter. Additionally, Ratzenberger provided the voice for Aniyaku the assistant manager in the English dub version of Studio Ghibli's Spirited Away (2002), which Lasseter also executive-produced.

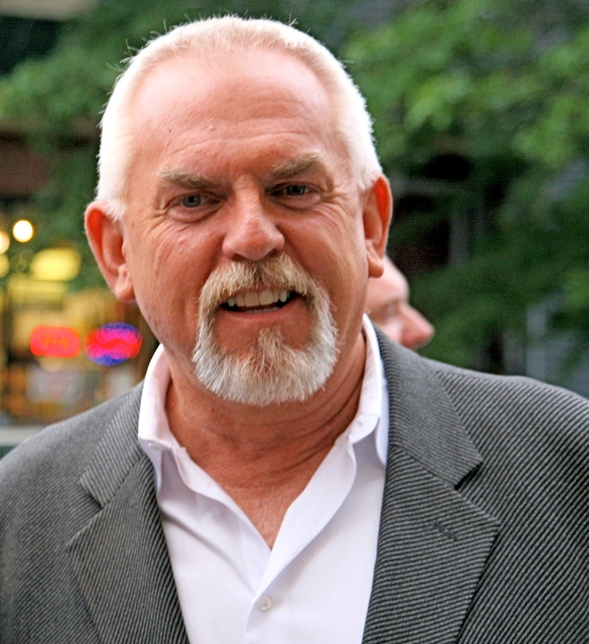
Ratzenberger at the 2008 Rhode Island International Film Festival

== Personal life ==
Ratzenberger lived in London for 10 years. Since 1994, he has lived in Vashon, Washington, as well as in Southern California's communities of Calabasas and Westlake Village. Ratzenberger has been married three times; he was married to his first wife Caroline for a year, divorcing in 1983. Ratzenberger married his second wife Georgia Stiny in 1984; during their 18-year marriage they had a daughter together and also adopted a son; after a separation, their divorce finalized in 2004. He married his third wife Julie Blichfeldt in 2012.

Ratzenberger developed a packaging-alternatives product made from biodegradable and non-toxic recycled paper as a safe alternative to foam peanuts and plastic bubble wrap. This product, SizzlePak, was manufactured by his company Eco-Pak Industries, which Ratzenberger co-founded in 1989. In 1992, he sold Eco-Pak to Ranpak Corp.

=== Political views ===
Ratzenberger has been a longtime registered Republican. During the 2008 presidential race, Ratzenberger campaigned for John McCain, appearing with former Cheers co-star Kelsey Grammer at several Republican party events. Ratzenberger was outspoken in opposition of the 2010 health care reform bill, referring to it as socialism. On January 17, 2010, he appeared and endorsed Scott Brown for the United States Senate at Mechanics Hall in Worcester, Massachusetts. Ratzenberger campaigned for Republican Josh Mandel of Ohio for state treasurer in 2010 and served as master of ceremonies for Mandel's inauguration into the position in 2011. He considered running for the U.S. Senate in Connecticut in 2012.

Ratzenberger endorsed Mitt Romney in 2012. He appeared on Your World with Neil Cavuto to support Donald Trump's candidacy during the 2016 presidential race, shortly after Trump was declared the presumptive Republican nominee. He praised Trump's performance as president in 2017, saying he had done "a wonderful job as far as manufacturing is concerned". Ratzenberger endorsed Trump again in 2024.

During the COVID-19 pandemic, Ratzenberger expressed his support for the United States Postal Service (USPS) in 2020 via Cameo and suggested people who wished to help them donate and buy presents for Christmas early.

== Filmography ==
=== Film ===
Year	Title	Role	Notes
1976	The Ritz	Patron	
1977	Twilight's Last Gleaming	Sgt. Kopecki	
1977	A Bridge Too Far	Lt. Wall	
1977	Valentino	Newshound	
1978	Warlords of Atlantis	Fenn	
1978	Superman	Missile Controller	
1979	Hanover Street	Sergeant John Lucas	
1979	Arabian Adventure	Achmed	
1979	Yanks	Corporal Cook	
1979	The Bitch	Hal Leonard	
1980	The Empire Strikes Back	Major Bren Derlin	
1980	Motel Hell	Drummer	
1980	Superman II	Controller No. 1	
1981	Outland	Tarlow	
1981	Ragtime	Policeman	
1981	Reds	Communist Leader	
1981	The Good Soldier	Jimmy	
1982	Battletruck	Rusty	
1982	Firefox	Chief Peck	
1982	Gandhi	American Lieutenant	
1984	Protocol	Security Guard on TV	Uncredited
1985	The Falcon and the Snowman	Detective	Uncredited
1987	House II: The Second Story	Bill Towner	
1987	Timestalkers	General Joe Brodsky	
1988	She's Having a Baby	Himself	
1995	Toy Story	Hamm (voice)	
1997	That Darn Cat	Dusty	
1997	Bad Day on the Block	Al Calavito	
1997	One Night Stand	Phil	
1998	A Bug's Life	P.T. Flea (voice)	
1999	Toy Story 2	Hamm (voice)	
2001	Monsters, Inc.	Yeti (voice)	
2002	Spirited Away	Aniyaku (voice)	
2003	Finding Nemo	Fish School (voice)	
2004	The Incredibles	The Underminer (voice)	
2006	Something New	Brian's Father	
2006	Cars	Mack; Hamm Truck, Yeti the Abominable Snowplow, P.T. Flea Car (voices)	
2007	Ratatouille	Mustafa (voice)	
2007	Your Friend the Rat	P.T. Flea (voice)	Short film; direct-to-video; archive footage from A Bug's Life
2008	The Village Barbershop	Art Leroldi	
2008	WALL-E	John (voice)	
2009	Up	Construction Foreman Tom (voice)	
2010	Toy Story 3	Hamm (voice)	
2010	What If...	Mike	
2011	Toy Story Toons: Hawaiian Vacation	Hamm (voice)	Short film
2011	Cars 2	Mack (voice)	
2011	Toy Story Toons: Small Fry	Hamm (voice)	Short film
2012	The Woodcarver	Ernest	
2012	Brave	Gordon (voice)	
2012	Toy Story Toons: Partysaurus Rex	Hamm (voice)	Short film
2013	Monsters University	Yeti (voice)	
2013	Planes	Harland (voice)	
2013	Super Buddies	Marvin "Gramps" Livingstone	Direct-to-video
2013	In the Name of God	Reverend Thomas	
2014	Planes: Fire & Rescue	Brodie (voice)	
2015	Russell Madness	Mick Vaughn	
2015	Inside Out	Fritz (voice)	
2015	The Good Dinosaur	Earl (voice)	
2016	Finding Dory	Bill (voice)	
2016	Pup Star	Mutt (voice)	Direct-to-video
2017	Pup Star: Better 2Gether	Salty (voice)	Direct-to-video
2017	Cars 3	Mack (voice)	
2017	Coco	Juan Ortodoncia (voice)	
2018	Shifting Gears	Conrad Baines	
2018	Incredibles 2	The Underminer (voice)	
2019	Toy Story 4	Hamm (voice)	
2020	Onward	Construction Worker Fennwick (voice)	
2022	Luck	Rootie (voice)	
2024	Inside Out 2	Fritz (voice)	
2024	Tapawingo	John Roan	
2024	Spellbound	Milo the Monster Handler (voice)	
2026	Swapped	Elder Javan (voice)	
2026	Toy Story 5	Hamm (voice)	
2026	Ray Gunn	TBA (voice)	

=== Television ===
Year	Title	Role	Notes
1979	Secret Army	Staff Sergeant Drexler	Episode: "The Execution"
1980	ITV Playhouse	Tom Phillips	Episode: "Friends in Space"
1981	The Good Soldier	Jimmy	Television film
1981	Goliath Awaits	Bill Sweeney	Television film
1981	Private Schulz	American Newsreel Commentator (voice)	Uncredited; episode #1.5
1981	Code Red	Inspector Ray Allen	Episode: "All That Glitters"
1982	Hill Street Blues	Phony Cop	Episode: "Some Like it Hot-Wired"
1982–93	Cheers	Cliff Clavin	274 episodes; directed 4 episodes
1983	Wizards and Warriors	Archie	Episode: "The Dungeon of Death"
1984	Magnum, P.I.	Walt Brewster	Episode: "The Legacy of Garwood Huddle"
1985	St. Elsewhere	Cliff Clavin	Episode: "Cheers"
1985	The Love Boat	Marty Elder	Episode: "A Day in Port"
1986	Combat Academy	Mr. Barnett	Television film
1987	Timestalkers	General Joe Brodsky	Television film
1987	The Tortellis	Cliff Clavin	Episode: "Frankie Comes to Dinner"
1988	Small World	Morris Zapp	6 episodes
1988	Mickey's 60th Birthday	Cliff Clavin	Television film
1990	Walt Disney's Wonderful World of Color	Cliff Clavin	Episode: "Disneyland's 35th Anniversary Celebration"
1990	Wings	Cliff Clavin	Episode: "The Story of Joe"
1990	The Earth Day Special	Cliff Clavin	Television film
1990	Camp Cucamonga	Marvin Schector	Television film
1990–96	Captain Planet and the Planeteers	Rigger (voice)	24 episodes
1992	Nurses	Mr. Hafner	Episode: "Illicit Transfers"
1993	Bill Nye the Science Guy	Host of Ferns	Episode: "Dinosaurs"
1993	Moon Over Miami	Norman Rust	Episode: "Farewell, My Lovelies"
1994, 2014	The Simpsons	Cliff Clavin, CGI Homer Simpson (voices)	Episodes: "Fear of Flying", "Treehouse of Horror XXV"
1995	Murphy Brown	Felix	Episode: "A Rat's Tale"
1995	Sister, Sister	Gus Kiamilikimaka	2 episodes
1996	Caroline in the City	Mr. Berman	Episode: "Caroline and Richard's Mom"
1996	Toy Story Treats	Hamm (voice)	Interstitials
1997	Happily Ever After: Fairy Tales for Every Child	Hinky (voice)	Episode: "The Pied Piper"
1997	Sabrina, the Teenage Witch	Bob/Santa Claus	Episode: "Sabrina Claus"
1997	The Detectives	Edsel	Episode: "Go West Old Man"
1998	Remember WENN	Mr. Abernathy	Episode: "And If I Die Before I Sleep"
2000	Touched by an Angel	Merl	Episode: "Monica's Bad Day"
2000	Pigs Next Door	Ike Stump	Recurring voice
2001	That '70s Show	Glen	Episode: "Holy Craps"
2001	The Drew Carey Show	Himself/Various	Episode: "Drew Live III"
2002	Frasier	Cliff Clavin	Episode: "Cheerful Goodbyes"
2002	The Pennsylvania Miners' Story	Thomas "Tucker" Foy	Television film
2003	8 Simple Rules	Fred Doyle	4 episodes
2004–08	Made in America	Himself	Host; 97 episodes
2006	Rodney	Himself	Episode: "Celebrity"
2006	Mystery Woman: Redemption	Jim Carter	Television film
2008	Our First Christmas	Joe Noll	Television film
2011	Melissa & Joey	Arnie	Episode: "A House Divided"
2012	Matchmaker Santa	George	Television film
2012–14	Drop Dead Diva	Larry Kaswell	3 episodes
2013	Bones	Bill Schumacher	Episode: "The Cheat in the Retreat"
2013	CSI: Crime Scene Investigation	Stu Kirchoff	Episode: "Torch Song"
2013–14	Legit	Walter Nugent	10 episodes
2013–14	Franklin & Bash	Judge Elliot Reid	3 episodes
2014	How Murray Saved Christmas	Officer Bender (voice)	Television special
2014	Secret Past (aka A Christmas Mystery)	Logan Walker	Television film
2015	The McCarthys	Charlie Ellis	Episode: "Hall of Fame"
2015	Hell's Kitchen	Himself	Episode: "11 Chefs Compete"
2017	Lego Star Wars: The Freemaker Adventures	Major Bren Derlin (voice)	Episode: "The Storms of Taul"
2019	Mom	Stan	Episode: "Audrey Hepburn and a Jalapeño Pepper"
2019	The Goldbergs	Digby Yates	Episode: "Food in a Geoffy"
2019	Forky Asks a Question	Hamm (voice)	Short films: "What is Money?", "What is a Friend?"
2020	Just Roll with It	Grandpa	4 episodes
2020	Bob Hearts Abishola	Hank	Episode: "Randy's a Wrangler"
2021–24	Monsters at Work	Adorable (Yeti), Bernard (voices)	8 episodes
2023	Poker Face	Abe	Episode: "The Night Shift"
2024–25	WondLa	Caruncle (voice)	3 episodes
2027	Cars: Lightning Racers	Mack (voice)	Upcoming series

==== Production credits ====
Year	Title	Director	Writer	Executive Producer	Notes
1978	Crown Court	No	Yes	No	Serial: "Scalped"
1980	ITV Playhouse	No	Yes	No	Episode: "Friends in Space"
1990	Sydney	Yes	No	No	Episode: "Georgie"
1988–91	Cheers	Yes	No	No	4 episodes
1990–91	Down Home	Yes	No	No	4 episodes
1994	Madman of the People	Yes	No	No	3 episodes
1994	Locals	No	No	Yes	TV Movie
1994	Evening Shade	Yes	No	No	Episode: "Mama Knows Best"
1996	Sister, Sister	Yes	No	No	Episode: "The Candidate"
1996	Pearl	Yes	No	No	Episode: "The Tutor"
1997	The World's Most Incredible Animal Rescues	No	No	Yes	TV Special
1997	The World's Most Incredible Animal Rescues: Part 2	No	No	Yes	TV Special
1998	The World's Most Incredible Animal Rescues: Part 3	No	No	Yes	TV Special
2010	Industrial Tsunami	No	No	Yes	Documentary

=== Video games ===
Year	Title	Voice role
1995	Toy Story	Hamm
1996	Toy Story: Activity Center	Hamm
1996	Disney's Animated Storybook: Toy Story	Hamm
1999	Toy Story 2: Buzz Lightyear to the Rescue	Hamm
2001	Toy Story Racer	Hamm
2002	Monsters, Inc.	Yeti
2004	Trivial Pursuit: Unhinged	Himself
2005	The Incredibles: Rise of the Underminer	The Underminer
2006	Cars	Mack
2009	Cars Race-O-Rama	Mack
2010	Toy Story 3: The Video Game	Hamm
2012	Kinect Rush: A Disney-Pixar Adventure	Hamm
2013	Disney Infinity	Hamm
2014	Disney Infinity 2.0	Hamm
2015	Disney Infinity 3.0	Hamm
2016	Disney Magic Kingdoms	Hamm
2018	Lego The Incredibles	The Underminer
2019	Kingdom Hearts III	Hamm

== Stage credits ==
Year	Title	Role	Venue	Notes
1973	The Ass-Hole		Soho Poly, London	
1974	The Connection		Hampstead Theatre, London	
2008–16	Toy Story: The Musical	Hamm (voice)	Disney Cruise Lines	Pre-recorded

== Awards and nominations ==
Award	Year	Category	Work	Result	Ref.
Primetime Emmy Award	1985	Outstanding Supporting Actor in a Comedy Series	Cheers	Nominated	
Primetime Emmy Award	1986	Outstanding Supporting Actor in a Comedy Series	Cheers	Nominated	
