= Luck (2022 film) =

2022 animated film directed by Peggy Holmes

- Promotional release poster
- Directed by: Peggy Holmes
- Screenplay by: Kiel Murray
- Story by: Jonathan Aibel Glenn Berger; Kiel Murray
- Produced by: John Lasseter; David Ellison; Dana Goldberg; David Eisenmann
- Starring: Eva Noblezada; Simon Pegg; Jane Fonda; Whoopi Goldberg; Flula Borg; Lil Rel Howery; Colin O'Donoghue; John Ratzenberger
- Cinematography: Thomas Leavitt; Ferran Llàcer Álvarez (camera); Eduardo Suazo (lighting)
- Edited by: William J. Caparella
- Music by: John Debney
- Production companies: Skydance Animation; Apple Studios
- Distributed by: Apple TV+
- Release date: August 5, 2022 (United States)
- Running time: 105 minutes
- Country: United States
- Language: English
- Budget: $140 million+

Luck is a 2022 American animated fantasy comedy film directed by Peggy Holmes from a screenplay written by Kiel Murray, and a story conceived by Murray and the writing team of Jonathan Aibel and Glenn Berger, based on an original concept created by Rebeca Carrasco, Juan De Dios, and Julián Romero. Produced by Skydance Animation, the film features the voices of Eva Noblezada, Simon Pegg, Jane Fonda, Whoopi Goldberg, Flula Borg, Lil Rel Howery, Colin O'Donoghue, and John Ratzenberger. Set in the Land of Luck, the story follows the unluckiest person, Sam Greenfield (Noblezada), as she must unite with a talking black cat named Bob (Pegg) to turn her luck around.

The project was announced in July 2017, shortly after Skydance Animation was formed on March 16, 2017, with Paramount Pictures distributing as the schedule for March 2021. Alessandro Carloni signed on to direct the film from a script by Aibel and Berger. The film underwent many changes during production, such as rewrites, directors, and release dates, and Holmes was later announced as the new director in January 2020, replacing Carloni. Much of the main voice cast, including Noblezada and Pegg, were revealed in January 2022, following the casting of Fonda and Goldberg in February and June 2021, respectively. Production was done remotely during the COVID-19 pandemic.

Luck premiered in Madrid on August 2, 2022, and was released on Apple TV+ and in select theaters in the United States on August 5. The film received mixed reviews from critics and became the highest-performing original family film on Apple TV+ as of July 2024.

== Plot ==
Sam Greenfield, an orphaned young woman with a life plagued by misfortune, is forced out from her foster home, much to the dismay of her younger friend and roommate Hazel, who is hoping to be adopted and not fostered soon. One night, after sharing food with a black cat, Sam finds a penny she hopes to give to Hazel for her collection of lucky items that may help her get adopted. The next day, Sam notices that the penny has made her luck improve. However, she loses the penny by inadvertently flushing it down a toilet.

While bemoaning her error, Sam encounters the cat again and says what happened, which causes the cat to berate her for losing the penny. Shocked that the cat could talk, Sam follows the cat through a portal to the Land of Luck, where creatures like leprechauns create good luck for the people on Earth. The cat, named Bob, needs the penny for traveling purposes and will be banished if word gets out that he lost it. Bob and Sam make a deal to get another penny from the Penny depot for Hazel to use before returning it to Bob. Bob uses a button from Sam to pass off as a penny while she sneaks into the Land of Luck using clothes belonging to Bob's personal leprechaun, Gerry. Throughout the journey, Sam comes to learn that bad luck is managed underneath the Land of Luck.

Following a disaster at the Penny depot which causes Gerry to learn about Sam's identity, Gerry uses a drone to retrieve the missing penny on Earth. However, the drone gets lost in the In-Between, a space between the Good and Bad Luck lands. Sam and Bob go to the In-Between, which is managed by a unicorn named Jeff. Jeff manages the Bad Luck Apparat, a machine that keeps bad luck specks from sticking which feeds the Randomizer, another machine that sends both good and bad luck into Earth. Jeff reveals that he found the penny and has returned it to the depot. Undeterred, Sam decides to visit Babe, the dragon who manages the good luck, in hopes to get another penny. Babe tells Sam how better things would be if everyone had good luck before giving her a new penny. But Sam sacrifices her penny after Bob is caught for faking his travel penny to spare him from banishment.

Still wanting to help Hazel, Sam and Bob decide to temporarily shut down the Bad Luck Apparatus to prevent bad luck from going to the Randomizer and give Hazel the luck she needs to get adopted. However, the bad luck specks start to clog Jeff's machines and destroy the good luck and bad luck stones within the Randomizer, which itself brings bad luck to the Land of Luck and Earth. Seeing Hazel did not get adopted because of this, learning that Bob is actually an unlucky English cat and having been found out as a human, Sam sulks in remorse. Bob apologizes and says that Hazel is the luckiest girl for having Sam at her side. Sam realizes things can be fixed because she remembers seeing some good luck in Bad Luck land while on her way to the In-Between.

In Bad Luck, they find it in a tiki bar where the bartender, a root monster named Rootie, who is Bob's old friend, gives them a jar of good luck they have been using. They take it to Babe to forge new good and bad luck stones. However, while creating a bad luck stone, Babe makes two good luck stones, wanting to create a world with only good luck. Before she can place them, Sam tells Babe people need bad luck as much as good luck. Realizing her mistake, she allows Sam to place the bad luck stone, and good luck is restored to normal, where Sam sees Hazel getting adopted by a new family. Bob is offered to keep his job at the Land of Luck, but decides he wants to live with Sam.

One year later, on Earth, Hazel's family spends time with Sam and Bob, who have accepted their bad luck.

== Voice cast ==
- Eva Noblezada as Sam Greenfield, an unlucky teenage human who discovers the Land of Luck and must unite with magical creatures there to turn her luck around
- Simon Pegg as Bob, a lucky, short haired black cat with a Scottish accent who becomes Sam's partner for the journey
- Jane Fonda as Babe, a female dragon who acts as the exuberant CEO of Good Luck and undisputed luckiest ancient being in all the land
- Whoopi Goldberg as The Captain, a leprechaun who acts as the Land of Luck's head of security
- Flula Borg as Jeff, a German-accented unicorn who works as the facilities engineer maintaining the luck distributing machine
- Lil Rel Howery as Marvin, Sam's upbeat boss who runs an arts and crafts shop
- Colin O'Donoghue as Gerry, a leprechaun who works with Bob
- John Ratzenberger as Rootie, a root monster who runs a tiki bar and the self-appointed Mayor of Bad Luck
- Grey DeLisle as Mrs. Rivera, Saoirse, the Penny Depot boss and additional voices
- Suzy Nakamura as a social worker
- Kwaku Fortune as Gael
- Adelynn Spoon as Hazel, Sam's best friend and roommate at the Summerland Home For Girls
- Kari Wahlgren as Hazel's adoptive mother and Aine
- Nick Thurston as Hazel's adoptive father
  - Thurston also voices a nosy cat
- Chris Edgerly as a typing Bunny
- Moe Irvin as Phil the Pig Foreman
- Fred Tatasciore as Quinn, Fred and additional voices

== Production ==
=== Development ===
In March 2017, Skydance Media formed a multi-year partnership with Madrid-based animation studio Ilion Animation Studios, forming an animation division called Skydance Animation. In July, it announced Luck would be distributed by Paramount Pictures as the first of part of their deal with Skydance Media and was given a release date of March 19, 2021. Alessandro Carloni signed on to direct the film, from a script by Jonathan Aibel and Glenn Berger based on an original concept by Rebeca Carrasco, Juan De Dios and Julián Romero. In April 2018, Paramount Animation entered into a partnership with Skydance Animation to produce Luck. Skydance Animation hired former Pixar Animation Studios and Walt Disney Animation Studios CCO John Lasseter in January 2019, as Head of Animation.

Following Lasseter's hiring, Soria announced that Paramount Animation would no longer consult with Skydance Animation, though they did not already have a formal creative partnership. Luck was still going to be released by Paramount Pictures without Paramount Animation until Apple TV+ acquired the distribution rights to it in December 2020. Apple Original Films would replace Paramount as a production company. On January 14, 2020, Carloni was replaced by Peggy Holmes, who previously directed Secret of the Wings (2012) and The Pirate Fairy (2014) under Lasseter's leadership at Disneytoon Studios, as the film's director. Kiel Murray, a screenwriter for Pixar on Lasseter's film Cars (2006) as well as Cars 3 (2017), was also hired to rewrite the screenplay and turned it into a workplace fantasy comedy similar to Monsters, Inc. (2001), with Aibel and Berger still being credited for the story co-written by Murray.

One of the core inspirations when researching the myths about luck is the main character Sam, having her in foster care to find her forever family. The main inspiration for Sam and her unluckyness came from television shows such as I Love Lucy and The Carol Burnett Show, along with other inspiration from Charlie Chaplin, Buster Keaton and Donald O'Connor. In researching luck, workers at Skydance Animation discovered how obsessed people are with the concept, along with some interesting reversals, including how it became random by good and bad luck. For example, black cats are considered good luck in Scotland, which led them to create Bob. By the end of the film, he is revealed to be English as black cats are considered bad luck in England. The land of Luck was designed by production designer Fred Warner to explain both sides being put of a coin.

=== Casting ===
In April 2019, Emma Thompson was hired to voice a character in the film, but left the project after Lasseter was hired. In February 2021, Jane Fonda was announced to have been cast as The Dragon, and in June, Whoopi Goldberg was announced as The Captain. Other cast members were announced in January 2022, including Eva Noblezada, Simon Pegg, Flula Borg, Lil Rel Howery, Colin O'Donoghue, John Ratzenberger and Adelynn Spoon.

=== Animation ===
Animation was provided by Skydance Animation Madrid (formerly Ilion Animation Studios) and was also made in Los Angeles and Connecticut. Portions of production were done remotely during the COVID-19 pandemic.

=== Music ===
Tanya Donelly and Mt. Joy were originally attached to compose the score for the film, while William J. Caparella served as lead editor. However, on November 15, 2021, it was announced that composer John Debney replaced them as composer. Noblezada did a cover of "Lucky Star" with additional vocals by Alana Da Fonseca, for the film's soundtrack by Milan Records.

== Release ==
Luck was released to Apple TV+ and in select theaters in the United States on August 5, 2022. The film was originally set to be released in theaters on March 19, 2021 by Paramount Pictures, but was delayed to February 18, 2022. On May 8, 2020, Skydance Animation president Holly Edwards revealed that the rough cut would have test screenings late in the summer of 2020. On December 16, 2020, Apple TV+ secured the distribution rights to the film, with it retaining the February date, before getting delayed to its current release date.

== Reception ==
=== Audience viewership ===
According to Nielsen data gathered by Puck News' Julia Alexander, Luck was watched by 2.2 million Apple customers in the U.S. aged two years or older within the film's first week on Apple TV+. In a July 2024 presentation to investors outlining the planned merger between Skydance Media and Paramount Global, management claimed that Luck was the "highest-performing original family film on Apple TV+".

=== Critical response ===
On the review aggregator website Rotten Tomatoes, 48% of 99 critics' reviews are positive. The website's consensus reads: "Luck is inoffensive enough as an animated babysitter, but there are far more original—and entertaining—options for its target audience." Metacritic, which uses a weighted average, assigned the film a score of 48 out of 100, based on 21 critics, indicating "mixed or average" reviews.

Peter Bradshaw from The Guardian rated the film two stars out of five, describing the script as "utterly zingless and contorted" and writing, "Everything about this robotically made movie looks derivative and contrived; the videogame aesthetic is dull and the quirky high concept plays like a pound-shop knockoff of Inside Out and Soul." John Anderson of The Wall Street Journal wrote, "The bigger problem is there are too many ideas, and fantastical solutions to manufactured problems, most of which feel as if they're being made up as the movie goes along." IndieWire's David Ehrlich gave it a D+ grade, calling it "a terrible idea for a movie, executed poorly, and by someone who used to know better. The best thing I can say about the finished product is that, unlike most forms of bad luck, this one is wonderfully easy to avoid altogether."

The Sydney Morning Herald's Paul Byrnes gave the film 3/5 stars, writing, "It has lively physical humour and appealing characters. The Scottish cat is a laugh, and the overall voice cast is distinguished, with Jane Fonda and Whoopi Goldberg in significant roles... But at 106 minutes, it's at least 15 minutes too long, with a complicated story that should have been smoothed out in development." The Daily Telegraph's Robbie Collin gave it 4/5 stars, calling it "a funny, imaginative, beautifully rendered coming-of-age parable, with strong overtones of Monsters, Inc. and Inside Out."

=== Accolades ===
Award	Date of Ceremony	Category	Recipient(s)	Result	Ref.
Hollywood Music in Media Awards	November 16, 2022	Original Score — Animated Film (Luck)	John Debney	Nominated	
Annie Awards	February 25, 2023	Outstanding Achievement for Character Design in an Animated Feature Production	Massimiliano Narciso	Nominated	

== Short film ==
On March 17, 2023, in celebration of St. Patrick's Day, Apple TV+ released a short film titled Bad Luck Spot!, directed by Matt Youngberg. It shows the Hazmat bunnies trying to get rid of a single bad luck crystal.
