= Sky Dance =

Skydance, formerly Paramount Skydance, is a major Hollywood studio and U.S. media company.

Sky Dance or skydance may also refer to:

== Groups, organizations, companies ==
- Skydance Media (2006–2025), former American film and media entertainment company
  - Skydance Animation, animation studio
  - Skydance Interactive, videogame company
  - Skydance Television, TV production company
  - Skydance Productions, film production company
- Skymaster Air Taxi (callsign SKY DANCE), a U.S. airline; see List of defunct airlines of the United States (Q–Z)
- Atlantic North Airlines (callsign SKY DANCE), a U.S. airline; see List of defunct airlines of the United States (A–C)

== Arts, entertainment, media ==
- Sky Dance (film), Cannes-selected 1980 animated film by Faith Hubley
- Sky Dance (book), a fantasy book by Scott Ciencin from the series Dinotopia

=== Public art ===
- Sky Dance, Lloydminster, Saskatchewan, Canada; a public artwork, see SK Arts
- Sky Dance, RAF Museum, Barnet, London, England, UK; a public sculpture, see List of public art in the London Borough of Barnet

=== Music ===
==== Albums ====
- Sky Dance (album), a 1988 album by Jon Ballantyne, winner of the 1990 Juno for best jazz album
- Skydances (album), a 1989 album by Holly Near

==== Songs ====
- "Sky Dance" (song), 1987 Benny Carter song off the 1987 album Central City Sketches
- "Sky Dance" (song), a song by John Trever, found on the 1972 album There Is Some Fun Going Forward
- "Sky Dances" (song), a 2018 orchestral concert piece by Kate Whitley

== Zoology ==
- sky-dance, a courtship display flown by the male long-legged buzzard
- sky-dance, a territorial display flown by the common buzzard
- sky-dance, a territorial display flown by the wedge-tailed eagle
- sky-dance, a territorial display flown by the martial eagle
- sky-dance, a display flown by the male tawny eagle
- sky-dance, a courtship display flown by the Bonelli's eagle
- sky-dance, a courtship display flown by the African hawk-eagle
- sky-dance, a courtship display flown by the ornate hawk-eagle
- sky-dance, a display flown by the mountain hawk-eagle
- sky-dance, a courtship display flown by the Cooper's hawk
- sky-dance, a courtship display flown by the male red-shouldered hawk
- sky-dance, a courtship display flown by the rufous crab hawk
- sky-dance, a courtship flight against rival males flown by the ferruginous hawk
- sky-dance, a courtship display flown by the Japanese sparrowhawk
- sky-dance, a courtship display flown by the Montagu's harrier
- sky-dance, a courtship display flown by the pied harrier

=== Other uses ===
- Skydance Bridge, Oklahoma City, Oklahoma, USA; a pedestrian bridge over Interstate 40

== See also ==
- Dance (disambiguation)
- Sky (disambiguation)
