= Ray Gunn =

2026 film by Brad Bird

- Release poster
- Directed by: Brad Bird
- Screenplay by: Brad Bird; Matthew Robbins
- Story by: Brad Bird
- Produced by: John Lasseter; Brad Bird; Lisa Beroud; David Ellison; Dana Goldberg
- Starring: Sam Rockwell; Scarlett Johansson; Tom Waits; Matt Berry; Bobby Cannavale; Michelle Rodriguez; Matt Jones; Aasif Mandvi; Alan Tudyk; Kathryn Hunter
- Edited by: Darren T. Holmes
- Music by: Michael Giacchino
- Production company: Skydance Animation
- Distributed by: Netflix
- Release dates: October 10, 2026 (BFI); December 4, 2026 (United States); December 18, 2026 (Netflix)
- Running time: 120 minutes
- Country: United States
- Language: English
- Budget: $150 million+

Ray Gunn is a 2026 American animated mystery film directed by Brad Bird and written by Bird and Matthew Robbins. It stars Sam Rockwell as Ray Gunn, the last human private detective, in a retro-futuristic world inhabited by humans and aliens. Scarlett Johansson, Tom Waits, Matt Berry, Bobby Cannavale, Michelle Rodriguez, Matt Jones, Aasif Mandvi, Alan Tudyk, and Kathryn Hunter co-star.

Ray Gunn premiered at the BFI London Film Festival on October 10, 2026, and is scheduled for release in select theaters on December 4 and on Netflix on December 18. The film received mixed to positive reviews for its animation, action, voice acting (particularly Waits), and direction; though some criticized the surface-level script and lengthy runtime.

== Premise ==
In Metropia, a gigantic city in an alternate future as seen from 1939, private eye Raymond Gunn is drawn into a case involving aliens, murder and a multimedia star named Venus Nova.

— Netflix

== Voice cast ==
- Sam Rockwell as Raymond "Ray" Gunn, a private detective and former police officer
- Scarlett Johansson as Venus Nova, a famous pop star and Ray's love interest struggling with a scandal that threatens to destroy her career
- Tom Waits as Eye-ra Kadok, Ray's partner at his detective agency who is an alien
- Matt Berry as Francis "Slugsy" Xavier, an alien mob boss
- Bobby Cannavale as Arnold Dom, Venus' husband and co-owner of the lounge Moon Room, who hires Ray to spy on her
- Michelle Rodriguez as Roz Dexler, a police captain
- Alan Tudyk as Barry Vogel, Venus' manager and first husband
- Michael Chernus as Sam Stelfreeze, a former cop turned studio fixer
- Patton Oswalt as a hologram
- Brad Bird as Gunsol and Musker, Xavier's alien henchmen
- Kathryn Hunter as Vanzine Kaluta, an alien working for Xavier who harbors unreciprocated feelings for Ray
- Kether Donohue as Levity Love, Venus' sound-alike

John Ratzenberger, Jamie Costa, Aasif Mandvi, Matt Jones, and Justin Peck have been cast in undisclosed roles. Bird also reportedly hired his son's soccer coach, known only as "Buck", to play a weapons dealer.

== Production ==
=== Background and development ===
Brad Bird wrote the original story for Ray Gunn as a mystery film set in an alternate future featuring "the sprawling, magnificent city of Metropia", and went on to develop the script with Matthew Robbins, who previously co-scribed with Bird on Batteries Not Included (1987). According to Bird, the inspiration for Ray Gunn came from viewing a trailer for the then-upcoming 1989 television film Peter Gunn which led to Bird coming up with a character with a pun name for raygun who would go on film noir inspired adventures in a retrofuturist world inspired by the 1930s and 1940s. He also mentions the B-52s' song "Planet Claire" as an inspiration: "The first time I heard the song ... I thought it was cover version of Henry Mancini's famous Peter Gunn theme song. Then, I realized that it sounded like a 1950s sci-fi movie. So, I thought that's not Peter Gunn, it's Ray Gunn. So, then I figured here's [a] detective's name."

Bird stated his love of film noir was a major reason for why he had such passion for the project and cited The Maltese Falcon, The Big Sleep, and Chinatown as influences for both story and style and even consulted with Chinatown screenwriter Robert Towne on how to craft a compelling mystery. Bird had previously attempted a similar noir themed animated project called The Spirit with co-writer Jerry Rees for producer Gary Kurtz during the early 1980s, which would have been adapted from the comic strip character of the same name by Will Eisner, but a lack of financier confidence saw the project abandoned. Despite abandoning The Spirit, Bird would base a lot of the characterization of the titular Ray Gunn on the character of The Spirit.

Originally, Ray Gunn was intended to be produced by Turner Feature Animation in the 1990s, but it was shelved when Bird went on to direct The Iron Giant (1999) at Warner Bros. Feature Animation instead following Turner Broadcasting System's merger with Time Warner in 1996. Despite this, Bird did not forget about his Ray Gunn project, stating that he negotiated for the rights to the material and telling Warner Bros. that, "Either let's make it or let me try to make it somewhere else."

Around 2019, Bird began an effort to revive the project at Warner Animation Group, who agreed to produce the film as a traditionally animated feature, however the film quickly fell out of favor at the studio due to the COVID-19 pandemic.

In 2021, Bird signed a deal with Skydance Animation to direct Ray Gunn. Bird worked again with John Lasseter, under whose leadership at Pixar he wrote and directed The Incredibles (2004), Ratatouille (2007), and Incredibles 2 (2018), and David Ellison and Dana Goldberg, under whose leadership at Skydance Media he directed Mission: Impossible - Ghost Protocol (2011); all four were producers on Ray Gunn. Bird also reassembled collaborators including the composer Michael Giacchino, character designers Teddy Newton and Tony Fucile, editor Darren T. Holmes, and storyboard artist Jeffrey Lynch. In February 2022, it was officially announced that Bird would revive the project after it became dormant for decades. That July, Bird described Ray Gunn as a more adult project in the noir genre, "sort of a detective film in an alternate future" that follows protagonist Raymond Gunn. He stated, "If you mashed up The Maltese Falcon with Buck Rogers, it might be something like that. But hopefully with a bit more action and funnier." Because of his desire to target a slightly older audience, Bird did not consider Pixar a potential candidate as he felt Ray Gunn would not fit its sensibilities.

In October 2023, it was reported that Ray Gunn would be computer-animated instead of hand-drawn as originally conceived, and that the budget had been trimmed, which would later be revealed to be $150+ million. Following the announcement of Pixar's Incredibles 3 (2028) in August 2024, TheWrap reported that Ray Gunn was still in development, and that it would be released by Netflix in 2026. His commitment to the project would cause Bird to step away from directing his screenplay for Incredibles 3, choosing Peter Sohn to replace him as director. Skydance Animation Madrid's VP of Finance and Operations, Carolina Borreguero Sanz, confirmed in October 2025 that Ray Gunn would release after the studio's third film, Swapped, both in 2026. In April 2026, Lisa Beroud was announced as another producer.

=== Animation and voice recording ===
Assets were provided by Skydance Animation Madrid, while the Rigging, Layout, Animation, CFX, Lighting, Rendering and Compositing were produced by Cinesite under the supervision of Skydance. In September 2025, John Ratzenberger, who previously voiced characters in each of Bird's Pixar films (the Underminer in the Incredibles films and Mustafa the waiter in Ratatouille), revealed during an appearance at FanX that he had begun voice recording.

In April 2026, Sam Rockwell, Scarlett Johansson, and Tom Waits were confirmed to have joined the cast. Waits was the first person cast and suggested Rockwell for Ray Gunn during his first recording session. Following a screening of the first seven minutes at the 2026 Annecy International Animation Film Festival, TheWrap reported that Patton Oswalt, who voiced the lead character Remy in Ratatouille, voices a hologram. In September 2026, Matt Berry, Bobby Cannavale, Michelle Rodriguez, Matt Jones, Aasif Mandvi, Alan Tudyk, Kether Donohue, Michael Chernus, Justin Peck, and Bird himself were revealed as a part of the voice cast.

=== Music ===
On July 27, 2022, Michael Giacchino, who had composed the music for each of Bird's films since The Incredibles, was announced to compose the score. New Zealand singer-songwriter Kimbra contributed three songs, including "Too Much to Ask" and "Innocent", all of which are performed by Johansson. Netflix will campaign "Too Much to Ask" for an Academy Award for Best Original Song nomination.

== Release ==
Ray Gunn had its world premiere at the 70th BFI London Film Festival on October 10, 2026. It also screened at the 15th Montclair Film Festival as the animation centerpiece on October 17, 2026, and the 33rd Austin Film Festival on October 31, 2026. It is scheduled for a limited theatrical release on December 4, 2026 before being released on Netflix on December 18.

Ray Gunn was originally set for release on Apple TV+. Two clips, including the first seven minutes, were previewed at the 2026 Annecy International Animation Film Festival on June 24.

== Reception ==
On review aggregator Rotten Tomatoes, 94% of 54 critics gave Ray Gunn a positive review, with an average rating of 7.7/10. Metacritic, which uses a weighted average, assigned a score of 73 out of 100 based on 21 critics, indicating "generally favorable" reviews. It currently serves as Skydance Animation's highest-rated film to date.

Drew Taylor of TheWrap wrote: "It's a doozy – as zippy and imaginative and full of ideas as Bird's very best work, a visually stunning, thematically rich masterpiece that pushes the boundaries of Western animation with wit and verve." Peter Bradshaw of The Guardian gave Ray Gunn five stars and felt it was "smart, witty, humane: a fantasy spectacular with old-fashioned entertainment values and some amazing cityscape design showcasing a beguiling and sweet romance." Pete Hammond of Deadline Hollywood praised the futuristic noir setting, writing, "Bird and his talented artisans manage to successfully merge two very different worlds, centuries apart in a cohesive and viable original universe that somehow seems right." In summary, he felt Ray Gunn "is a love letter to the movies past and futuristic."

Jeremy Mathai of Screen Rant gave Ray Gunn an eight out of ten, praising the animation, storyline, action sequences, and the voice cast, especially Scarlett Johansson. Matt Singer of ScreenCrush also gave it eight out of ten, writing: "But despite all of that vintage flavor, Ray Gunn somehow doesn't feel stodgy or old fashioned [sic]. It's got a frenetic pace, a solid sense of fun, and an ample supply of stellar chase scenes from Bird, who may be the most underrated working director of action in animation and live-action in Hollywood today. Kate Erbland of Indiewire gave Ray Gunn "B–", saying it was "a highly creative mish-mash of seemingly disparate genres and tones that mostly work well together – set in a retro-futurist city that looks like if Blade Runner was considerably less scuzzy, it's a hard-boiled detective noir tale that also imagines a universe in which humans and aliens co-exist somewhat peacefully – despite ultimately feeling let down by muddled messaging."

Guy Lodge of Variety was impressed by the worldbuilding, but felt "it's never quite as funny as it should be, while its characters – in particular the eponymous hero, a smooth-talking P.I. voiced by Sam Rockwell – want for texture and soul. Audiences should happily speed along with them on their adventures, but after a fairly long two hours in their company, we don't feel terribly attached to them." Angie Han of The Hollywood Reporter wrote: "It's a blandly palatable jumble of sci-fi and neo-noir clichés, not so much awful as underwhelming. Lacking in both visual pop and emotional specificity, it's a forgettable entry in an otherwise rich career that's run the gamut from Ratatouille to The Incredibles to Mission: Impossible – Ghost Protocol." Marshall Shaffer of The Playlist wrote that Bird "overstuffs the film with homages to the classics and futuristic worldbuilding. The problem grows beyond a bloated runtime. Bird's project becomes too imitative and not iterative at all."
