= Post Grad =

- Promotional film poster
- Directed by: Vicky Jenson
- Written by: Kelly Fremon
- Produced by: Ivan Reitman; Joe Medjuck; Jeffrey Clifford
- Starring: Alexis Bledel; Zach Gilford; Rodrigo Santoro; Jane Lynch; Carol Burnett; Michael Keaton
- Cinematography: Charles Minsky
- Edited by: Dana Congdon
- Music by: Christophe Beck
- Production companies: Fox Atomic; The Montecito Picture Company; Cold Spring Pictures
- Distributed by: 20th Century Fox
- Release date: August 21, 2009
- Running time: 88 minutes
- Country: United States
- Language: English
- Budget: $15 million
- Box office: $6.4 million

Post Grad is a 2009 American romantic comedy-drama film directed by Vicky Jenson (in her first solo and only live-action directorial film) and starring Alexis Bledel, about a recent college graduate who moves back in with her family while she figures out what she wants to do next.

Originally under the working titles of Ticket to Ride and then The Post-Grad Survival Guide, the film was released by 20th Century Fox on August 21, 2009, and was a critical and commercial failure.

== Plot ==
Ryden Malby, who has had her life carefully planned out since she was eleven years old, prepares to graduate from college with a bachelor's degree in English, albeit during the late-2000s recession, having planned her academic life since she was in high school to get a college scholarship. At the graduation ceremony, Ryden's family arrives late, causing a commotion. In addition to her optimistic father Walter, who wants to do everything by himself, her mother Carmella, who carefully administrates the short resources of the household, and younger brother Hunter, who aspires to race in a boxcar derby, her eccentric grandmother Maureen arrives, accompanied by her ever-present oxygen tank. Ryden's longtime rival, Jessica Bard, gives the graduation speech and then Ryden and her family go out to celebrate, accompanied by Ryden's best friend, Adam Davies, who has had passionate feelings for Ryden since they met during their freshman year. Adam has applied to law school at Columbia, but is undecided between a career in music or studying law. Meanwhile, Ryden reveals to her family that she has an interview scheduled the following week for her dream job as an assistant editor at the prestigious publishing company Happerman and Browning in Los Angeles, and that she has even found a fabulous loft that she plans to rent.

En route to the job interview, Ryden gets her car into a collision with a truck and when the driver departs without giving her his insurance information, she is forced to walk to Happerman and Browning. Upon arriving, disheveled and stressed, she is directed to a waiting area filled with other applicants. When Ryden is finally called in to interview and asked why she desires the job, she eloquently explains that she has been preparing for this opportunity for her entire life and would never imagine herself doing anything else, after which the interviewer awkwardly thanks her for her time. As she is departing, Jessica arrives and is greeted warmly by the interviewer, and is ultimately successful in obtaining the job.

Now unemployed, a frustrated Ryden gives up on the loft and moves back in with her family. As they are unloading her belongings, Walter steps in poop left by a cat belonging to his next-door neighbor, David Santiago, and furiously confronts him. Adam observes Ryden meeting and forming a romantic connection with David. She then proceeds to interview for numerous jobs, all without success, while suffering various embarrassing encounters with Jessica. When Walter accidentally runs over David's cat with Ryden's car, she and David further connect, and he offers her a job as a production assistant on the infomercials that he directs. One night, they become physically intimate, but the moment is interrupted when Ryden's family arrives to shockingly find them in a compromising position. Still undecided about his plans, Adam obtains a gig headlining at a local venue and plans a big night with a fancy celebration dinner with Ryden. However, Ryden ends up spending the evening with David, completely disregarding her plans with Adam. When she arrives home, Adam, who has been waiting for her, ends their relationship, criticizing her inability to commit to him.

Eventually, Ryden is notified by Happerman and Browning of Jessica's dismissal from the company because of her excessively aggressive nature. She eagerly accepts the job offer, but soon becomes crestfallen due to long hours spent on menial tasks. After unsuccessfully attempting to contact Adam to apologize, she finally, in a grand gesture, drives a borrowed ice cream truck to where he is playing a game of basketball, reminding him of his earlier advice to her that an Eskimo Pie can solve any dilemma. He forgives her, but then confesses that they currently cannot spend time together because he is departing for New York the following day, and he will contact her when he has finally settled in. David, planning to soon return to his family in Brazil, advises her that whom she spends her life with is far more important than what she does with her life. Inspired, she packs her belongings, quits her job, travels to New York, and surprises Adam by confessing her romantic feelings towards him, and they finally begin their long-delayed romantic relationship.

== Cast ==
- Alexis Bledel as Ryden Malby
- Zach Gilford as Adam Davies
- Michael Keaton as Walter Malby
- Jane Lynch as Carmella Malby
- Carol Burnett as Maureen Malby
- Bobby Coleman as Hunter Malby
- Rodrigo Santoro as David Santiago
- Catherine Reitman as Jessica Bard
- Craig Robinson as Funeral director
- J. K. Simmons as Roy Davies
- Mary Anne McGarry as Barbara Snaff
- Vanessa Branch as Receptionist
- Fred Armisen as Guacanator pitchman
- Alexandra Holden as Cute funky girl
- Andy Daly as Lloyd Hastings
- Desean Terry as Young Cop
- Angel Oquendo as Police Officer
- Walter Emanuel Jones as Voice Cast
- Demetri Martin (uncredited) as TV commercial producer

== Production ==
Amanda Bynes was originally set to star, but dropped out and was replaced by Alexis Bledel.

== Reception ==
Post Grad was panned by film critics. On Rotten Tomatoes the film has an approval rating of 9% based on 100 reviews. The site's consensus states: "A lightweight, unambitious comedy, Post Grad features fine actors that can do little with its middling, uninspiring script." On Metacritic it has a score of 35 out of 100, based on 25 reviews, indicating "generally unfavorable reviews". Audiences surveyed by CinemaScore gave the film a grade B on scale of A to F.

Peter Debruge of Variety magazine wrote: "As fiction characters go, Ryden seems as dull as they come, making it hard to muster much sympathy for her plight".

Roger Ebert gave the film three out of four stars, stating, "If you're cynical or jaded, it might not get past you. But here is the first movie in a long time that had me actually admitting I wouldn't mind seeing a sequel."

== Box office ==
During opening weekend, the film opened at #11, grossing $2,651,996.

== Home media ==
The film was released on DVD and Blu-Ray on November 24, 2009.
