= Skydance Animation =

American animation studio

Skydance Animation, LLC
- Logo used since 2020
- Type: Division
- Industry: Animation; Motion pictures; Television
- Founded: March 16, 2017; 9 years ago
- Founder: David Ellison; Javier Pérez Dolset; Ignacio Pérez Dolset
- Headquarters: Santa Monica, California, United States
- Key people: Holly Edwards (president); John Lasseter (head of animation)
- Number of employees: 900 (2022)
- Parent: Skydance Media (2017–2025); Paramount Pictures (2025–present)
- Divisions: Madrid; Los Angeles; Stamford, Connecticut
- Website: skydance.com/animation/

Skydance Animation, LLC is an American animation studio based in Santa Monica, California. It was founded on March 16, 2017, and operates under the Paramount Pictures division of Skydance Motion Picture Group, itself a division of Skydance. It is primarily known for its animated feature films produced for theatrical and streaming release. Alongside its headquarters, Skydance Animation has offices in Stamford, Connecticut, and Madrid, Spain; the Madrid branch was originally Ilion Animation Studios.

The studio's first film, Luck, was released on August 5, 2022, on Apple TV+. Its most recent film is Swapped, released on May 1, 2026, on Netflix. Its upcoming slate includes Ray Gunn (2026), an untitled Jack and the Beanstalk project (both for Netflix) and Cosmic Motors (for Paramount Pictures).

== History ==
Logo from 2017 to 2020

In March 2017, Skydance Media formed an animation division and a multi-year partnership with Madrid, Spain-based animation studio Ilion Animation Studios. In July, it announced its first two films, Split, for a release in 2019, and Luck. Both films would be distributed by Paramount Pictures as part of their deal with Skydance Media. On October 10, 2017, Bill Damaschke was hired to head the division as president of animation and family entertainment, and Luck was given a release date of March 19, 2021. In April 2018, Paramount Animation entered into a partnership with Skydance Animation to produce Luck.

Skydance Animation signed on directors Alessandro Carloni (Kung Fu Panda 3) to direct Luck, Vicky Jenson (Shrek and Shark Tale) to direct Spellbound, and Nathan Greno (Tangled) to write and direct Swapped (formerly known as Pookoo). In January 2019, Skydance Animation hired former Pixar and Walt Disney Animation Studios CCO John Lasseter as head of Animation, supplanting Damaschke. While some outlets reported feelings of disapproval of this decision owing to prior allegations of sexual misconduct against Lasseter, many others, particularly those at the studio, "[...] had strong feelings and felt like it was the right thing to do [...] and were excited to get to work with him" and it was "[...] definitely not a black-and-white situation" according to Damaschke. Then-Paramount Animation president Mireille Soria announced that the studio would no longer consult with Skydance Animation, though they did not already have a formal creative partnership. Following Lasseter's hiring, the studio grew from 65 employees to nearly 900 as of July 2022. Holly Edwards, who previously served as Skydance Animation's Head of Production, was promoted to the position of president at Skydance Animation. Peggy Holmes (The Little Mermaid: Ariel's Beginning, Secret of the Wings and The Pirate Fairy) was later announced as new director of Luck, replacing Carloni who left over creative differences.

Skydance formally acquired Ilion Animation Studios and rebranded it as Skydance Animation Madrid in April 2020.

In June 2020, Shane Prigmore, an animation veteran who co-created Tangled: The Series, was hired as SVP Development at Skydance Animation. He would be tasked with overseeing the creative development of all films and TV series on the studio's production slate. That is until he left for Warner Bros. Pictures Animation as Senior Creative Advisor in June 2023.

In July 2020, it was announced that Luck and Spellbound were still going to be released by Paramount without Paramount Animation as part of their deal with Skydance Media, giving the two release dates of February 18, 2022, and November 11, 2022, respectively. Paramount's president of domestic distribution, Chris Aronson stated "These films not only continue our longstanding relationship with Skydance, but, along with Paramount Animation's own upcoming films, mean we will be releasing event-level animated films for years to come."

However, on December 16, 2020, Apple TV+ entered talks to take over the distribution rights to the films Luck and Spellbound. Apple Original Films would replace Paramount for both Luck and Spellbound. In February 2021, Apple signed an overall deal with Skydance Animation which included animated films and television series. This includes a television adaptation of the novel The Search for WondLa by Tony DiTerlizzi. The series has been greenlit for two seasons and was announced to feature showrunner Lauren Montgomery as both writer and executive producer with DiTerlizzi and Chad Quant. She has since left the project and has been replaced by Bobs Gannaway, another of Lasseter's Disney-era colleagues.

On October 1, 2021, Skydance Animation released its first short film inspired by a true story from Joe Mateo called Blush. It was released on Apple TV+ as part of their multi-year deal. The ships from the short film became the mascots of the studio during the release of Luck, and a portion of Joy Ngiaw's score was used for the fanfare of the studio.

In February 2022, it was announced that Brad Bird would revive his long-dormant project Ray Gunn for Skydance Animation after it was originally set up at Turner Feature Animation during the late 1990s. On March 16, 2022, Rich Moore revealed that he had entered into an exclusive, multi-year overall deal with Skydance Animation. In July 2022, Ellison and Lasseter planned for Skydance Animation to make two feature films a year, with their theatrical strategy to be determined on a film-by-film basis. The company is also building a consumer products team to capitalize on its potential successes and began to open a 5.8-acre Santa Monica campus in October, which was completed by November 2023.

In October 2023, Skydance Animation had signed a multi-year deal with Netflix to develop and produce animated films, ending the studio's partnership with Apple. Netflix would take over distribution of preexisting Skydance Animation titles from Apple TV+, including Spellbound, Swapped, and Ray Gunn. This deal however does not include WondLa, which was created by Apple.

In May 2024, Bruce Anderson, producer of Spellbound, was hired as head of production at Skydance Animation to oversee production planning for the studio's slate of films. The following month, longtime Disney Animation director Don Hall was announced to have joined Skydance Animation to develop and produce an original animated film for the studio. However in November 2026, a month after Paramount Skydance acquired Warner Bros. Discovery it was announced that Hall left the studio to return to Walt Disney Animation Studios.

In December 2024, Cinesite became an animation partner to Skydance Animation Madrid on an upcoming film, later revealed to be Brad Bird's Ray Gunn. In March 2026, it was revealed that the partnership would be extended through Rich Moore's untitled Jack and the Beanstalk project.

Skydance Animation was included as part of the merger of Skydance and Paramount Global, which was completed on August 7, 2025. Skydance planned to integrate its animation division with franchises from both Paramount Animation and Nickelodeon to expand its content offerings. However, on the day of the merger, it was announced that Skydance Animation would continue to be operated separately and focus on its existing deal with Netflix.

In September 2026, Netflix and Paramount Skydance announced that their agreement would conclude after the releases of Ray Gunn and the untitled Jack and the Beanstalk project, with the latter assuming theatrical-first distribution for future projects. This includes Cosmic Motors, a new film directed by John Lasseter and co-directed by Louie del Carmen.

=== Production logo ===
With the release of Blush in October 2021, Skydance Animation revealed their first logo. With the release of Luck in August 2022, their full logo was released and shows the rocket and the UFO from Blush which are now the mascots of the studio launched from their planet (also from Blush) flying around to form the studio's logo with magic blue and pink trails, the fanfare was composed by Joy Ngiaw which was adopted from the theme of Blush. It was animated by their Madrid branch, Skydance Animation Madrid and their head of animation, John Lasseter. The behind the music of the studio's logo was posted by Joy Ngiaw.

== Filmography ==
Release timeline
2022	Luck
2023
2024	Spellbound
2025
2026	Swapped
2026	Ray Gunn
TBA	Cosmic Motors
TBA	Untitled Jack and the Beanstalk project

=== Feature films ===
Films produced by Skydance Animation
Release	Title	Director(s)	Writer(s)		Producer(s)	Composer(s)	Distribution	Animation Service(s)
Release	Title	Director(s)	Screenplay by	Story by	Producer(s)	Composer(s)	Distribution	Animation Service(s)
August 5, 2022	Luck	Peggy Holmes Co-director: Javier Abad	Based on an original concept by: Rebeca Carrasco; Juan De Dios; Julián Romero		John Lasseter; David Ellison; Dana Goldberg; David Eisenmann	John Debney	Apple TV+	Skydance Animation Madrid
August 5, 2022	Luck	Peggy Holmes Co-director: Javier Abad	Kiel Murray	Jonathan Aibel; Glenn Berger; Kiel Murray	John Lasseter; David Ellison; Dana Goldberg; David Eisenmann	John Debney	Apple TV+	Skydance Animation Madrid
November 22, 2024	Spellbound	Vicky Jenson Co-director: Jorge Blanco	Based on an original concept by: Jorge Blanco; Marcos Martínez Carvajal; Nicholas Costa Cabral Schlesinger; Ignacio Pérez Dolset		John Lasseter; David Ellison; Dana Goldberg; Bruce Anderson; Linda Woolverton	Alan Menken (score) Alan Menken; Glenn Slater (songs)	Netflix	Skydance Animation Madrid
November 22, 2024	Spellbound	Vicky Jenson Co-director: Jorge Blanco	Lauren Hynek; Elizabeth Martin; Julia Miranda	Vicky Jenson; Lauren Hynek; Elizabeth Martin	John Lasseter; David Ellison; Dana Goldberg; Bruce Anderson; Linda Woolverton	Alan Menken (score) Alan Menken; Glenn Slater (songs)	Netflix	Skydance Animation Madrid
May 1, 2026	Swapped	Nathan Greno	John Whittington; Christian Magalhaes; Robert Snow	John Whittington; Adam Karp; Christian Magalhaes; Robert Snow; Nathan Greno	John Lasseter; David Ellison; Dana Goldberg; Mary Ellen Bauder Andrews	Siddhartha Khosla	Netflix	Skydance Animation Madrid

==== Upcoming films ====
Films produced by Skydance Animation
Release	Title	Director(s)	Writer(s)		Producer(s)	Composer(s)	Distribution	Animation Service(s)	Production status	Ref.
Release	Title	Director(s)	Screenplay by	Story by	Producer(s)	Composer(s)	Distribution	Animation Service(s)	Production status	Ref.
December 4, 2026	Ray Gunn	Brad Bird	Brad Bird; Matthew Robbins	Brad Bird	John Lasseter; Brad Bird; Lisa Beroud; David Ellison; Dana Goldberg	Michael Giacchino	Netflix	Skydance Animation Madrid; Cinesite Animation	Completed	
TBA	Untitled Jack and the Beanstalk project	Rich Moore	Based on the fairy tale by: Benjamin Tabart		John Lasseter; David Ellison; Dana Goldberg	TBA	Netflix	Skydance Animation Madrid; Cinesite Animation	In production	
TBA	Cosmic Motors	John Lasseter Co-director: Louie del Carmen	TBA		John Lasseter; David Ellison; Dana Goldberg	TBA	Paramount Pictures	TBA	In development	

=== Short films ===
Release	Title	Director(s)	Producer(s)	Composer	Distribution	Animation Service(s)
October 1, 2021	Blush	Joe Mateo	Heather Schmidt Feng Yanu	Joy Ngiaw	Apple TV+	Skydance Animation Madrid
March 17, 2023	Bad Luck Spot!	Matt Youngberg	Laurel Ladevich	John Debney	Apple TV+	Skydance Animation Madrid
March 1, 2025	Flink's Pigeon Problems: A Magical Rescue	Susan Fitzer; Brian Pimental	John Lasseter; Tony Cosanella	Aaron Kenny	Netflix	Skydance Animation Madrid

== Television series ==
=== Released ===
Release	Season	Episodes	Title	Showrunner/Developer	Composer	Network	Co-Production	Animation Service(s)
June 28, 2024	1	7	WondLa	Bobs Gannaway	Joy Ngiaw	Apple TV+	Gotham Group	ICON Creative Studio
April 25, 2025	2	7	WondLa	Bobs Gannaway	Joy Ngiaw	Apple TV+	Gotham Group	ICON Creative Studio
November 26, 2025	3	6	WondLa	Bobs Gannaway	Joy Ngiaw	Apple TV	Gotham Group	ICON Creative Studio

== Reception ==
=== Critical response ===
Film	Critical	
Film	Rotten Tomatoes	Metacritic
Luck	48% (99 reviews)	48 (21 reviews)
Spellbound	48% (42 reviews)	54 (11 reviews)
Swapped	69% (48 reviews)	56 (11 reviews)
Ray Gunn	94% (54 reviews)	73 (21 reviews)

=== Accolades ===
Award	Date of ceremony	Category	Recipient(s)	Result
Hollywood Music in Media Awards	November 17, 2021	Original Score – Short Animated Film (Blush)	Joy Ngiaw	Won
Music + Sound Awards	October 13, 2022	Original Score – Short Animated Film (Blush)	Joy Ngiaw	Won
Annie Awards	February 26, 2022	Outstanding Achievement for Music in an Animated Television/Media Production (Blush)	Joy Ngiaw	Nominated
Hollywood Music in Media Awards	November 16, 2022	Original Score – Animated Film (Luck)	John Debney	Nominated
Annie Awards	February 8, 2025	Character Design in an Animated Feature Production (Spellbound)	Guillermo Ramíre	Nominated
Annie Awards	February 8, 2025	Storyboarding in an Animated Feature Production (Spellbound)	Alex Relloso Horna, Carlos Zapater Oliva	Nominated
Artios Awards	February 12, 2025	Feature Animation (Spellbound)	Jason Henkel	Nominated
Children's & Family Emmy Awards	March 1–2, 2026	Outstanding Individual Achievement in Animation – Production Design (Spellbound)	Brett Nystul	Won

== See also ==
- Paramount Animation
- Warner Bros. Pictures Animation
- Nickelodeon Animation Studios
- Warner Bros. Animation
- Cartoon Network Studios
- Williams Street
- Hanna-Barbera Studios Europe
