= Vicky Jenson =

American animator (born 1960)

- Jenson in 2024
- Born: Victoria Jenson; March 4, 1960 (age 66); Los Angeles, California, U.S.
- Occupations: Director, animator, storyboard artist, production designer
- Years active: 1977–present
- Employers: DreamWorks Animation (2000–2005); Skydance Animation (2017–2025)
- Notable work: Shrek, Shark Tale, Post Grad, Spellbound

Victoria Jenson (born March 4, 1960) is an American film director of both live action and animated films. She has directed projects for DreamWorks Animation, including Shrek, the first film to win an Academy Award for Best Animated Feature, giving rise to one of Hollywood's largest film franchises.

== Career ==
=== Biography and early work ===
Jenson began painting cels at the age of 13. She attended the Academy of Art University in San Francisco and California State University Northridge, and learned to paint backgrounds on The Flintstones and The Smurfs at Hanna Barbera Studios where she worked summers to cover fall semesters. She later became a storyboard artist for Warner Bros., Marvel and Disney Television, and variously worked as a production designer, art director and co-producer". In the early 1980s, Jenson worked on the storyboard backgrounds on the He-Man and the Masters of the Universe cartoon series for Filmation. She was also a design and color stylist on Mighty Mouse: The New Adventures, John Kricfalusi's influential reboot of Mighty Mouse, in the 1980s. Due to her connections with Kricfalusi, she was offered a job as a painter at Spümcø to work on The Ren & Stimpy Show on its second season; she migrated to Games Animation with other background painters including Bill Wray after Kricfalusi's firing, working sporadically on the third and fourth seasons. In 1992, Jenson was the art director for FernGully: The Last Rainforest, and the production designer for Computer Warriors: The Adventure Begins and Playroom.

=== DreamWorks ===
In 2000, Jenson began working for DreamWorks as a production designer and story artist for The Road to El Dorado. After working on the film, the studio initially hired Jenson to work on Shrek as a story artist, with the directors to be Andrew Adamson (also a first-time director) and the late Kelly Asbury, who had joined in 1997 to co-direct the film. However, Asbury left a year later for work on the 2002 film Spirit: Stallion of the Cimarron, and Jenson was selected by producer Jeffrey Katzenberg to be the new director of the film. Jenson recalled her experience being brought into Shrek, and eventually tapped to direct, as follows:

For a long time, the movie didn't know what it wanted to be. One problem was unavoidable: Chris Farley had died, and the story had been geared around him, so when he went, the story kind of went with him. It went through an upheaval while they tried to find the right tone for it. I think they were really close to shelving the project when a few of us came into story to try and find a tone that we could work with. When Kelly Asbury moved on to Spirit: Stallion of the Cimarron I became head of story, along with Randy Cartwright. Along with Andrew Adamson, who stayed on as director, we started pulling little pieces together out of what remained, and part of the way through, Jeffrey decided that I should be directing. A few months later, we started production.

Jenson described the directing process as one in which "we didn't try to figure out how to make adolescents laugh. You have to use yourself as the best judge and use your own instincts. We figured if we laughed at it, chances are good someone else would too". According to Adamson, the co-directors mutually decided to split the work in half, so the crew could at least know whom to go to with specific questions about the film's sequences: "We both ended up doing a lot of everything", "We're both kinda control freaks, and we both wanted to do everything." Following the success of Shrek, Jenson went on to co-direct Shark Tale with Eric "Bibo" Bergeron and Rob Letterman. In 2003, while working on Shark Tale, Jenson received the first annual Kiera Chaplin Limelight award given at the Women's Image Network Awards.

=== Live-action work ===
She directed a live-action short, Family Tree, which "premiered at Sundance, screened at countless festivals, including Sundance, SXSW, Aspen and Malibu and went on to win multiple festival awards". In 2009, she finished her first live-action feature directorial work for the Alexis Bledel-starring comedy, Post Grad. The film received generally negative reviews. Also in 2009, Jenson directed all of the spots for the year-long "Modelquins" ad campaign for Old Navy, including the "Supermodelquins Christmas" ads. She was represented by the Anonymous Content agency for the campaign.

In 2015, Jenson directed a stage production of the play, Time Stands Still, by Donald Margulies. The Los Angeles Times wrote of Jenson's stage directorial debut: "the staging by Vicky Jenson successfully captures the script's broad contours", and Broadway World praised the production, stating that "Vicky Jenson smoothly directs her uniformly skilled four-member cast".

=== Skydance Animation ===
In July 2017, it was reported that Jenson was directing an untitled animated fantasy film. The film tells of a teenager who "comes of age using magical powers to defend her family when the opposing forces of light and darkness threaten to divide her kingdom. The untitled project was later titled Spellbound. In 2026, Jenson announced that she had lost her job with the studio during the previous year.

== Personal life ==
Jenson is the sister of classical violinist Dylana Jenson. Jenson owns a Border Collie.

== Filmography ==
=== Feature films ===
Year	Title	Director	Art Director	Layout Design	Story Artist	Production Designer	Other	Notes
1985	The Secret of the Sword	No	No	No	Yes	No	No	
1987	Rock Odyssey	No	No	No	No	No	Yes	Background Artist
1987	Slam Dance	No	No	No	Yes	No	No	
1987	Pinocchio and the Emperor of the Night	No	No	No	Yes	No	No	
1988	She's Having a Baby	No	No	No	Yes	No	No	
1988	Pound Puppies and the Legend of Big Paw	No	No	No	No	No	Yes	Design
1990	Playroom	No	No	No	No	Yes	No	
1992	FernGully: The Last Rainforest	No	Yes	Yes	Yes	No	Yes	Layout
2000	The Road to El Dorado	No	No	No	Yes	Additional	No	
2000	Chicken Run	No	No	No	No	No	Yes	Additional Story
2001	Shrek	Yes	No	No	No	No	No	
2003	Sinbad: Legend of the Seven Seas	No	No	No	Additional	No	No	
2004	Shark Tale	Yes	No	No	No	No	No	
2005	Cerebral Print: The Secret Files	No	No	No	No	No	Yes	Actress
2008	Madagascar: Escape 2 Africa	No	No	No	No	No	Yes	Development
2009	Post Grad	Yes	No	No	No	No	No	
2024	Spellbound	Yes	No	No	No	No	Yes	Story, Voice of Old Blue-Haired Woman

=== Television ===
Year	Title	Cel Painter
1977	The Flintstones	Yes
1981	The Smurfs	Yes

== Awards and nominations ==
Year	Award	Category	Nominated work	Result
2001	Academy Awards	Academy Award for Best Animated Feature	Shrek	Won
2001	BAFTA Awards 2001	Children's Award, Best Feature Film	Shrek	Won
2001	Annie Awards	Outstanding Individual Achievement for Directing in an Animated Feature Production	Shrek	Won
2001	Cannes Film Festival	Palme d'Or	Shrek	Nominated
2001	L.A. Film Critics Association	Best Animation	Shrek	Won
2001	National Board of Review	Best Animated Feature	Shrek	Won
2001	Karlovy Vary International Film Festival	Audience Award	Shrek	Won
2002	BAFTA Awards 2002	Best Adapted Screenplay	Shrek	Won
2002	Critics' Choice Awards 2002	Best Animated Film	Shrek	Won
2002	People's Choice Awards	Favorite Motion Picture.	Shrek	Won
2003	Aspen Shorts Fest 2003	Audience Award, Glenwood Springs Section	Family Tree	Won
2003	SXSW 2003	Special Jury Award, Narrative Short	Family Tree	Won
2003	Dragon*Con Independent Film Festival	Best Short	Family Tree	Won
2003	Dragon*Con Independent Film Festival	Best Magical Realism	Family Tree	Won
2003	Empire Film Festival 2003	Audience Award, Best Short	Family Tree	Won
2003	Malibu Film Festival 2003	Best of the Fest	Family Tree	Won
2003	Malibu Film Festival 2003	Best Live Action Short	Family Tree	Won
2003	DeadCENTER Film Festival	Grand Jury Award	Family Tree	Won
2003	Wine Country Film Festival 2003	Best Short Film (Novela Form Film)	Family Tree	Won
2004	Big Bear Lake Int'l Film Festival 2004	Jury Award, Best Short Film	Family Tree	Won
2005	Academy Awards	Best Animated Feature	Shark Tale	Nominated
2005	BAFTA Awards 2005	Children's Award, Best Feature Film.	Shark Tale	Nominated
2005	ASCAP Awards 2005	Top Box Office Film	Shark Tale	Won
