= Swapped =

2026 film by Nathan Greno

- Promotional release poster
- Directed by: Nathan Greno
- Screenplay by: John Whittington; Christian Magalhaes; Robert Snow
- Story by: John Whittington; Adam Karp; Christian Magalhaes; Robert Snow; Nathan Greno
- Produced by: John Lasseter; David Ellison; Dana Goldberg; Mary Ellen Bauder Andrews
- Starring: Michael B. Jordan; Juno Temple; Tracy Morgan; Cedric the Entertainer; Justina Machado
- Edited by: Tim Mertens
- Music by: Siddhartha Khosla
- Production company: Skydance Animation
- Distributed by: Netflix
- Release date: May 1, 2026
- Running time: 98 minutes
- Country: United States
- Language: English

Swapped is a 2026 American animated fantasy adventure comedy film directed by Nathan Greno and written by John Whittington, Christian Magalhaes, and Robert Snow, who all co-wrote the story with Greno and Adam Karp. Produced by Skydance Animation, the film stars the voices of Michael B. Jordan, Juno Temple, Tracy Morgan, Cedric the Entertainer, and Justina Machado. The plot follows a small Pookoo named Ollie (Jordan) and a Javan named Ivy (Temple) who are accidentally transformed into each other's species, forcing them to work together when navigating life in each other's bodies to survive a series of adventures.

Swapped was released on Netflix and select theaters on May 1, 2026. Although it received mixed reviews from critics, it became a huge success during its first week on Netflix, reaching 38 million views and outperforming KPop Demon Hunters, which previously claimed the spot from 2025-2026.

== Plot ==
The Pookoo are a race of sloth-like creatures who live in a flooded valley populated by animal-plant hybrids. An inventive young Pookoo named Ollie is curious about the other creatures living in the valley, despite the warnings of his parents and his grandmother, who tells Ollie a story about how the creatures of the valley used to live in harmony thanks to large tree-elephant-like creatures called the Dzo, who gave them magical pods that enabled them to change forms and understand each other better. However, a Treewolf, who terrorized the valley and resented the peace the Dzo brought, stole a pod to become the Firewolf. He then killed four Dzos and caused a rock slide, creating a large dam that blocked the river, flooding the valley and preventing the surviving Dzo from returning. The species have not interacted with one another since.

During a celebration of a bountiful harvest, Ollie meets a bird-like Javan chick, and shows her how to get food on the island. However, the other Javans storm Pookoo Island and take over the food sources. Eleven Years later, the Pookoo are certain that they will starve as their emergency food storage runs low, and Ollie struggles to make amends. He ends up attempting to fix his mistake by using reflective glass shards to make the Javans leave the harvest grounds. However, one Javan attacks Ollie, and he falls into a hole, where he inadvertently lands on a magical pod while trying to escape and is transformed into a Javan. He is then chased off the island by his tribe and falls into the river.

Ollie is soon rescued by the Javan who attacked him earlier, named Ivy, alongside her sisters Violet and Lily. Ollie soon meets an amiable, but absent-minded fish named Boogle who informs him of a pod on a nearby dead Dzo. He tries to get to it, but Ivy interferes and is turned into a Pookoo. Boogle then tells them of another pod by the Great Waterfall. As the duo journey there, they encounter various creatures of the valley and learn of each species' strengths. During the journey, Ollie learns from Ivy that she only brought her flock to the island because the food sources at her own home, Javan Rock, were running low, and several members of her flock had already died of starvation, including her parents.

Ollie and Ivy make it to the pod and promise Boogle to bring it to him to change into a different creature, due to him being the only one of his kind. However, when they reach the pod, Ollie hesitates about trusting Ivy, and the two are ambushed by a pack of Treewolves, leading them to slip and fall onto the pod, both transforming into Boogle fish. Boogle says he knows where to find more pods, and Ollie and Ivy decide to put their differences aside. At a waterfall, Ollie and Ivy find the pods and transform back into their original forms. When they allow Boogle to use the pods, he reveals himself to be the Firewolf, who divided the valley years ago due to his own pain of being rejected by his pack and ostracized by the other species and was transformed by the Dzo into a fish to stop him. The Firewolf then destroys the remaining pods and severely injures Ivy, knocking her unconscious. Ollie manages to scale Javan Rock with Ivy in tow, saving her life.

After recovering, Ivy and the other creatures all take refuge on Pookoo Island as the Firewolf attacks the valley. Ollie convinces his father, Caloo, to trust the other creatures despite their differences. As the Firewolf approaches the island, a desperate Ollie goes to the hole he fell into earlier, which contains a dead Dzo. The Dzo's spirit sends Ollie a pod, which he uses to turn into a Dzo himself. Using his newfound abilities, he battles and subdues the Firewolf and dismantles the dam, killing the Firewolf and sacrificing himself in the process.

As Ollie's friends and family mourn him and the valley recovers, the Dzo who left the valley years ago return and reveal that Ollie is alive and has been returned to his Pookoo form by them. With the Firewolf gone, the valley becomes peaceful once more as both the Pookoo and Javans now reconnect and work with each other, including the Dzo and the other creatures.

== Voice cast ==
- Michael B. Jordan as Ollie, a Pookoo, a small brown two-toed sloth-like creature who switches species with Ivy.
  - Camden Brooks as Young Ollie
- Juno Temple as Ivy, a Javan, resembling a cross between a kakapo and a secretarybird, who switches species with Ollie.
- Tracy Morgan as the Firewolf, a rogue tree-wolf and the runt of his litter who gained the powers of fire. He was tricked by a Dzo and was transformed into Boogle, a purple grouper-like fish with algae for fins.
- Cedric the Entertainer as Caloo, a Pookoo and Ollie's father.
- Justina Machado as Calli, a Pookoo and Ollie's mother.
- Ambika Mod as Violet, a Javan and Ivy's younger sister.
- Lolly Adefope as Lily, a Javan and Ivy's youngest sister.
- Táta Vega as:
  - Ollie's grandma, a Pookoo and Ollie’s grandmother
  - Mrs. Dung Beetle
- Nate Torrence as Lodd, a Pookoo and friend of Ollie's.
- John Ratzenberger as Elder Javan
- Johnny Williams as Mr. Dung Beetle
- David Lodge as Tree-Wolf Father
- Fred Tatasciore as:
  - Elder Javan
  - Rock Bear
- Zemo Tatasciore as Tree-Wolf Pup.
- Kari Wahlgren as:
  - A female Pookoo
  - Javan nurse
- Maven Morgan as a young Pinecone
- Nathan Greno as Root Snake #1
- Tim Mertens as Root Snake #2

== Production ==
In February 2018, it was announced that Nathan Greno had signed a multi-year contract with Skydance Media to write and direct an animated film provisionally titled Powerless, as well as consult on projects in development. In January 2019, Skydance Animation hired former Pixar and Walt Disney Animation Studios CCO John Lasseter as head of Animation. The project reunited Lasseter with Greno, who previously directed Tangled (2010) alongside Byron Howard under Lasseter's leadership at Walt Disney Animation Studios. In April 2020, Greno's film was revealed to be retitled to Pookoo. In October 2023, Siddhartha Khosla was revealed to be composing the film's score. In October 2025, Skydance Animation Madrid's VP of Finance and Operations, Carolina Borreguero Sanz, confirmed that the studio had delivered the film, which had been retitled from Pookoo to Swapped. Michael B. Jordan and Juno Temple were revealed as cast members the following month. In January 2026, Tracy Morgan and Cedric the Entertainer were revealed as cast members. That same month, Tim Mertens, editor of Tangled, Bolt (2008), Wreck-It Ralph (2012), and Big Hero 6 (2014), was revealed to be the editor of Swapped.

== Release ==
Swapped was originally intended to be released on Apple TV+, but in October 2023, Netflix took over the film's distribution rights from Apple, as part of a new multi-year deal with Skydance Animation, while setting it initially for a 2025 release. In June 2025, Netflix announced that the film would premiere in 2026. The film was screened at the Sebastiani Theatre in Sonoma on January 9, 2026, ahead of its limited theatrical release and premiere on Netflix on May 1.

It became a huge success during its first week on Netflix, reaching 38 million views, taking over the spot of KPop Demon Hunters, which previously claimed the spot from 2025-2026.

=== Marketing ===
In June 2024, a first look of a rendered image from the film was released in Netflix's Next on Netflix: Animation 2024 presentation. In June 2025, Netflix revealed a second rendered image at the Annecy Film Festival.

== Reception ==
On the review aggregator website Rotten Tomatoes, 69% of 47 critics' reviews are positive, with an average rating of 5.8/10. Metacritic, which uses a weighted average, assigned the film a score of 56 out of 100, based on 11 critics, indicating "mixed or average" reviews.

Benjamin Lee of The Guardian awarded the film two stars out of five, comparing it unfavorably with Hoppers, criticizing the "off-brand, bought down the market quality of Skydance animation" and summarizing it as "a fairly rote buddy comedy quest narrative". Grant Hermanns of Screen Rant gave the film a score of 3 out of 10, writing: "Swapped is not merely bound to be forgotten. It's also one of Netflix's worst animated movies yet." Jacob Oller for The A.V. Club gave the film a "C" grade, writing: "Even if it wasn't hot on the tail of Pixar's Hoppers, Swapped would still be an overly familiar adventure towards empathy, one light on comedy and insight despite plenty of visual imagination in its world of flora-fauna hybrids." David Ehrlich of IndieWire also gave it an unfavorable "C" grade, praising Nathan Greno's direction, Michael B. Jordan's emotive voice work, and Siddhartha Khosla's score while faulting it for its "derivative, low-ambition execution" and its tendency to feel like a "fleeting, off-brand distraction rather than a memorable children's classic."

Owen Gleiberman of Variety gave the film a favorable review, describing it as a "visually ravishing" and "touching" woodland fairy tale that overcomes its simple, formulaic narrative with "surprise enchantment." Frank Scheck of The Hollywood Reporter gave it a positive review, writing that despite rehashing a "very familiar formula" behind Hoppers, it "has its appeals" through "beautiful" animation, fast pacing, and a standout comedic performance by Tracy Morgan that elevates the narrative.

William Bibbiani of TheWrap gave it a mixed review, calling it an "effective fantasy story for all ages" that, despite an "eye-rolling start" and "hackneyed plot" beats, ultimately builds into an "absorbing, intelligent, emotional film" with ambitious world-building and beautiful animation. Zachary Lee of RogerEbert.com rated it 2.5 out of 4 stars, writing that what it lacks in "narrative originality" and its disjointed, rapid-fire resolution of conflicts, it successfully balances through a game vocal cast, an "uplifting" theme of empathy, and an impressively realized world that treats its sincere messages with genuine care.

Natalia Winkelman of The New York Times, noted that while the animation is "middling" and lacks the polish of premier studios, the film ultimately "gets a pass" for its strong visual storytelling and its earnest message of community trust.
