= Peggy Holmes =

American dancer and film director

- Occupations: Choreographer; dancer; screenwriter; film director
- Years active: 1984–present

Peggy Holmes is an American choreographer, dancer, screenwriter, and film director. Her full-length directorial debut was on 2008's The Little Mermaid: Ariel's Beginning. She later directed Secret of the Wings (2012) and The Pirate Fairy (2014) from the Tinker Bell film series. She uses her choreography skills to bringing life to characters; animated and otherwise. Her choreography credits includes: The Country Bears, The Old Broads, I Love Trouble, Hocus Pocus, Newsies, and The Fabulous Baker Boys. Peggy's choreography was also used though television shows, specifically; for the Pilot Episode of Fame L.A. She appeared in the TV show Hocus Pocus 25th Anniversary Halloween Bash. On January 14, 2020, Peggy Holmes was hired to direct the animated film Luck.

== Filmography ==
=== Films ===
Year	Title	Director	Writer	Choreographer	Other	Notes
1984	Gimme an 'F'	No	No	Assistant	Yes	Duck #1
1988	Totally Minnie	No	No	No	Yes	Dancer; Television Film
1988	The In Crowd	No	No	Assistant	Yes	Key Dancer
1988	Ladykillers	No	No	Assistant	No	Television Film
1989	Little Nemo: Adventures in Slumberland	No	No	No	Yes	Dancer
1989	The Fabulous Baker Boys	No	No	Yes	No	Choreographer: "Makin' Whoopee"
1992	Wayne's World	No	No	Yes	No	Choreographer: "Fox Lady"
1992	Newsies	No	No	Yes	No	
1992	Encino Man	No	No	Yes	No	
1993	Hocus Pocus	No	No	Yes	Yes	Dancer
1993	Gypsy	No	No	No	Yes	Movement Consultant; Television Film
1995	Jury Duty	No	No	Yes	No	
1995	Father of the Bride Part II	No	No	Yes	No	
1996	A Very Brady Sequel	No	No	Yes	No	
1998	Quest for Camelot	No	No	Dance	No	Assistant
1998	Houdini	No	No	Yes	No	Television Film
1999	The Deep End of the Ocean	No	No	Yes	No	
2000	Beautiful	No	No	Yes	No	
2001	These Old Broads	No	No	Yes	No	Television Film
2001	Rock Star	No	No	Yes	No	
2003	The Jungle Book 2	No	No	Yes	No	Choreographer: "Jungle Rhythm", "W-I-L-D"
2004	The Lion King 1½	No	No	Additional	No	Direct-to-video
2004	Mickey, Donald, Goofy: The Three Musketeers	No	No	Yes	No	Direct-to-video
2004	Mickey's Twice Upon a Christmas	"Belles on Ice"	"Belles on Ice"	"Belles on Ice"	No	Story Director; direct-to-video
2005	Kronk's New Groove	No	No	Yes	No	Direct-to-video
2008	The Little Mermaid: Ariel's Beginning	Yes	No	No	Yes	Additional Screenplay Material; Direct-to-video
2012	Secret of the Wings	Yes	Screenplay	No	No	
2013	Planes	No	No	No	Yes	Senior Creative Team
2014	The Pirate Fairy	Yes	Story	No	Yes	Additional Dialogue
2014	Planes: Fire & Rescue	No	No	No	Yes	Senior Creative Team
2014	Tinker Bell and the Legend of the NeverBeast	No	No	No	Yes	Senior Creative Team
2022	Luck	Yes	No	No	No	

=== Television series and specials ===
Year	Title	Choreographer	Dance Sequences	Other	Notes
1985	Knots Landing	No	No	Yes	Driver; episode: "A Piece of the Pie"
1990	Hull High	Assistant	No	No	
1994	Something Wilder	No	Yes	No	Episode: "Gotta Dance"
1997-1998	Fame L.A.	Yes	No	No	
2011	Pixie Hollow Games	No	No	Yes	Thanks

=== Music video compilations ===
Year	Title	Director
1993	Dangerous: The Short Films	Associate
