= Skydance Animation Madrid =

Spanish animation studio

- Formerly: Ilion Animation Studios (2002–2020)
- Type: Division
- Industry: CGI animation
- Founded: 2002; 24 years ago
- Founders: Javier Perez Dolset; Ignacio Pérez Dolset
- Headquarters: Las Rozas de Madrid, Madrid, Spain
- Key people: Ignacio Pérez Dolset (COO); Jose San Román (CEO); Gonzalo Rueda (CTO & COO)
- Owner: Skydance
- Parent: Skydance Animation (2020–present)

Skydance Animation Madrid (formerly known as Ilion Animation Studios) is a Spanish animation studio based in Madrid, Spain. It is owned by the animation division of Skydance. After working with the former Skydance Media since 2017, they were acquired by the company in 2020, and rebranded as Skydance Animation Madrid.

== History ==
Ilion Animation Studios was originally based in Madrid, Spain. The Perez Dolset brothers, Javier and Ignacio Perez Dolset, founded the company in the year of 2002 to make animated films. Ilion Animation Studios was a partner with U-Tad, which is a European University that is specialized in digital arts and technology. Ilion came up with all of its own content. On occasion, Ilion worked with some of its third parties. Ilion Animation Studios was independently and privately owned.

In March 2017, Ilion announced that they would partner with Skydance Animation to produce two animated feature films: Luck and Spellbound. Skydance Animation formally acquired the studio in April 2020, renaming it as Skydance Animation Madrid.

Former logo as Ilion Animation Studios

== Productions ==
=== Feature films ===
==== Released films ====
Title	Release date	Budget	Gross	Co-production
as Ilion Animation Studios
Planet 51	20 November 2009	$70 million	$105.6 million	HandMade Films; TriStar Pictures
Mortadelo and Filemon: Mission Implausible	28 November 2014	$12.5 million	$5.5 million (in Spain)	Warner Bros. Pictures; Zeta Cinema; Películas Pendelton
Wonder Park	15 March 2019	$80–100 million	$119.6 million	Paramount Animation; Nickelodeon Movies
as Skydance Animation Madrid
Luck	5 August 2022	$140 million	—N/a	Apple Studios; Skydance Animation
Spellbound	22 November 2024	—N/a	—N/a	Netflix; Skydance Animation
Swapped	1 May 2026	—N/a	—N/a	Netflix; Skydance Animation

Release timeline
2009	Planet 51
2010
2011
2012
2013
2014	Mortadelo and Filemon: Mission Implausible
2015
2016
2017
2018
2019	Wonder Park
2020
2021
2022	Luck
2023
2024	Spellbound
2025
2026	Swapped
2026	Ray Gunn
TBA	Jack and the Beanstalk

==== Upcoming films ====
Title	Release date	Ref(s)	Co-production
Ray Gunn	December 18, 2026		Cinesite; Netflix; Skydance Animation
Untitled Jack and the Beanstalk project	TBA		Cinesite; Netflix; Skydance Animation

=== Short films ===
Title	Release date	Co-production
Blush	October 1, 2021	Apple TV+ Skydance Animation
Bad Luck Spot!	March 17, 2023	Apple TV+ Skydance Animation
