= Dana Goldberg (producer) =

American studio executive

- Dana Goldberg's Official Company Potrait
- Education: University of Missouri (B.A.)
- Occupations: studio executive; television producer; film producer
- Years active: 1996–present
- Title: co-chair of Skydance Motion Picture Group

Dana Goldberg is an American studio executive and film and television producer. She serves as the co-chair of Skydance Motion Picture Group with Josh Greenstein, overseeing operations for Paramount and Warner Bros. Pictures, and has served as the chair of Paramount Television Studios from August 2025 to October 2026. She was previously the chief creative officer of Skydance Media and helped found Skydance Television.

== Career ==
=== Early career ===
From 1996 to 1999, Goldberg was a creative executive and then vice president of production at Baltimore/Spring Creek Pictures, a production company owned by filmmaker Barry Levinson and producer Paula Weinstein. Prior to that, Goldberg was an assistant at Hollywood Pictures, a former label of The Walt Disney Company.

In 1999, Goldberg joined American film production company Village Roadshow Pictures in the role of senior vice president of production. In April 2003, Goldberg was promoted to executive vice president and head of production. At Village Roadshow, Goldberg was executive producer for the films Happy Feet, I Am Legend, The Matrix and Ocean's Eleven.

=== Skydance ===
In August 2010, Goldberg was hired as Skydance Productions' president of production, where she oversaw development and production of the Mission: Impossible franchise, Jack Reacher, the Coen brothers' True Grit and World War Z.

In August 2013, Goldberg was promoted to chief creative officer, where she oversaw the studio's production and creative development of television and film releases, mostly focusing on action, adventure, fantasy and science fiction films, including The Adam Project. In 2013, Goldberg helped found Skydance Television, which produced the television series Grace and Frankie, Reacher, and Jack Ryan. Goldberg was an executive producer of the 2022 action-drama Top Gun: Maverick.

=== Paramount and later Skydance Corporation ===
In August 2025, Goldberg was named co-chair of Paramount Pictures, alongside Josh Greenstein, and chair of Paramount Television Studios, which was revived in 2025. In the joint role, Goldberg gained oversight of production, distribution, marketing and strategic planning across Paramount Pictures and Television Studios. In August 2025, in her and Greenstein's first move, five hours after the announcement of their new role, the two signed American actor Timothée Chalamet and filmmaker James Mangold to the upcoming film High Side, reuniting Chalamet and Mangold for the first time since the biographical film A Complete Unknown. Goldberg oversaw the release of slasher film Scream 7 which earned approximately $100M globally during its opening weekend.

In August 2025, Goldberg secured the rights for a live-action Call of Duty film, based on the popular video game franchise, in partnership with the original and current owners of the franchise rights, Activision Blizzard and Microsoft. That same month, Goldberg secured a deal with Netflix's Stranger Things creators the Duffer Brothers. In September 2025, she signed a global distribution deal with film studio Legendary Entertainment, which plans to launch with a live-action film based of the video game and media franchise Street Fighter, set for release in fall 2026, as well as a multi-picture deal with actor Will Smith and his entertainment company Westbrook.

In December 2025, Goldberg signed a three-year first-look deal with filmmaker Jon M. Chu, which brought Chu and his production company Electric Company to the Paramount lot. In 2026, Goldberg signed similar three-year first-look deals with filmmaker Dan Trachtenberg, who directed Predator: Badlands, the highest-grossing film in the Predator franchise, and with actress and writer Issa Rae. In April 2026, Goldberg and Greenstein presented at Cinema United's convention for movie theater owners, called CinemaCon, held in Las Vegas. At the convention, Goldberg shared plans for 15 theatrical film releases during 2026, nearly twice the amount the studio released in 2025, including a sequel to the 2013 film World War Z. At that presentation, Goldberg and Greenstein debuted a short reel by Chu, featuring actors and filmmakers from the Paramount lot, including James Cameron and Tom Cruise. In May 2026, the co-chairs announced a first look deal with Warner Music Group.

On October 5, 2026, Paramount Skydance announced the leadership structure for the combined company of Skydance after its merger with Warner Bros Discovery. Dana Goldberg and Josh Greenstein were named co-chairmen of the Skydance Motion Picture Group, with responsibility for the vision, strategy, operations, production, development, business affairs, marketing and distribution of Paramount Pictures, Warner Bros. Pictures and the company's broader film portfolio.

== Filmography ==
Producer

- Terminator Genisys (2015)
- Mission: Impossible – Rogue Nation (2015)
- Life (2017)
- Geostorm (2017)
- Gemini Man (2019)
- 6 Underground (2019)
- The Old Guard (2020)
- The Tomorrow War (2021)
- The Adam Project (2022)
- Luck (2022)
- The Greatest Beer Run Ever (2022)
- Ghosted (2023)
- Heart of Stone (2023)
- Spy Kids: Armageddon (2023)
- Spellbound (2024)
- The Gorge (2025)
- The Old Guard 2 (2025)
- Fountain of Youth (2025)
- The Family Plan 2 (2025)
- Swapped (2026)
- Mayday (2026)
- Matchbox: The Movie (2026)
- Way of the Warrior Kid (2026)
- Ray Gunn (2026)
