= Spellbound (2024 film) =

2024 animated film directed by Vicky Jenson

- Promotional poster
- Directed by: Vicky Jenson
- Screenplay by: Lauren Hynek; Elizabeth Martin; Julia Miranda
- Story by: Vicky Jenson; Lauren Hynek; Elizabeth Martin
- Produced by: John Lasseter; David Ellison; Dana Goldberg; Bruce Anderson; Linda Woolverton
- Starring: Rachel Zegler; John Lithgow; Jenifer Lewis; Tituss Burgess; Nathan Lane; Javier Bardem; Nicole Kidman
- Cinematography: Todd Heapy (camera); Miguel Pablos Contreras (lighting)
- Edited by: Susan Fitzer
- Music by: Alan Menken
- Production company: Skydance Animation
- Distributed by: Netflix
- Release date: November 22, 2024
- Running time: 110 minutes
- Country: United States
- Language: English

Spellbound is a 2024 American animated musical fantasy comedy film directed by Vicky Jenson from a screenplay by Julia Miranda and the writing team of Lauren Hynek and Elizabeth Martin, based on a story conceived by Jenson, Hynek, and Martin. It features music composed by Alan Menken, who also wrote the songs with longtime collaborator and lyricist Glenn Slater. Produced by Skydance Animation, the film features the voices of Rachel Zegler, John Lithgow, Jenifer Lewis, Tituss Burgess, Nathan Lane, Javier Bardem, and Nicole Kidman. Set in the world of magic known as Lumbria, the story follows Princess Ellian (Zegler) who must break the spell that has turned her parents (Bardem and Kidman) into monsters and split her kingdom in two.

The project, initially titled Split, was announced in July 2017, shortly after Skydance Animation was formed in March 2017, with Paramount Pictures scheduling distribution for 2019. The film subsequently underwent changes, such as release dates, with Jenson later announced as the director, and the film's title changed to The Unbreakable Spell, before eventually getting to its current title. The film was acquired by Apple TV+ in December 2020, before Netflix took over the rights in October 2023. Much of the main voice cast signed on in June 2022, following Zegler's casting in April 2022. Production was done remotely during the COVID-19 pandemic.

Spellbound premiered at the Paris Theater in New York City on November 11, 2024, and was released via Netflix on November 22. It received mixed reviews from critics.

== Plot ==
In the magical kingdom of Lumbria, Princess Ellian has to deal with the fact that her parents, King Solon and Queen Ellsmere, had been transformed into feral monsters a year ago, following a journey in the Dark Forest of Eternal Darkness. Royal advisors, Ministers Bolinar and Nazara Prone, help her supervise and hide the monsters from the public, but without any success of transforming them back, they think Ellian should become the new Queen since she will come of age on her 15th birthday. As a last attempt to bring her parents back, Ellian arranges a meeting with two deities, Sunny and Luno, the Oracles of the Sun and Moon respectively. However, upon their visit, the monster King and Queen scare them off, leaving behind only a magical device called "The Fob" that combines their powers.

Ellian accidentally lets the monsters out of their cages, and they wreak havoc in the kingdom, making the subjects as well as the Captain of the Guards aware of the situation. With panic erupting among the people, the Captain orders the monsters be removed from the kingdom, prompting Ellian to use the Fob's magic so that she and her parents can escape and visit the Oracles themselves. She uses the Fob again to lose the guards and the ministers chasing them, causing Bolinar to accidentally switch bodies with Ellian's pet rodent Flink.

At the cottage of Sunny and Luno in the Dark Forest, they reveal that only Ellian's parents can reverse the spell by traveling to the Lake of Light and also warn Ellian of a darkness that is attracted to negative feelings. During the journey, when they avoid the dark magic vortex that appears after Ellian's distressed feelings attract it, the King and Queen regain their ability to talk, but not the memories of their former selves. Bolinar tries to lead the guards to them, but Ellian helps her parents escape through a desert full of quicksand. After Ellian saves a gryphon baby from the quicksand and returns it safely to its parents, Solon and Ellsmere remember what it is to be a parent and finally recognize Ellian as their daughter. The return of their humanity makes Bolinar realize that Ellian was right about not losing hope, while he also begins to enjoy his new body after befriending creatures of Flink's species.

The group reaches the Lake of Light, and it shows that Solon and Ellsmere's constant arguing was the cause of their transformation after they unknowningly lured the dark magic vortex. Realizing they were an unhappy couple, they tell Ellian that they cannot be together anymore. The vortex of dark magic returns and engulfs an upset Ellian as she chastises her parents on their decision to split up, and Solon and Ellsmere are soon both captured by Cardona and the guards, who still believe that they are dangerous beasts. They successfully convince their subjects otherwise after Bolinar gathers Flink's conspecifics to stop the guards and break them free. Solon and Ellsmere then use the light of the lake to save Ellian from the darkness before she ends up turning into a monster. Assured that her parents' love for her has never changed and never will, Ellian makes peace with their decision of separating, understanding it will not break their family bond. They hug and the spell is lifted, turning Solon and Ellsmere back into humans and returning Flink and Bolinar to their respective bodies.

One year later, Solon and Ellsmere are divorced and living in separate castles, but managing to rule the kingdom and raise Ellian together in harmony. On her 16th birthday, Ellian is having a big celebration with her family and friends, happily embracing both good and bad changes in her life.

== Voice cast ==
- Rachel Zegler as Princess Ellian
- Nicole Kidman as Queen Ellsmere, Ellian's mother
- Javier Bardem as King Solon, Ellian's father
- Dee Bradley Baker as Flink, Ellian's pet rodent
- John Lithgow as Minister Bolinar
- Jenifer Lewis as Minister Nazara Prone
- Olga Merediz as General Cardona
- Tituss Burgess as Sunny, the Oracle of the Sun
- Nathan Lane as Luno, the Oracle of the Moon
- John Ratzenberger as Milo, The Monster Handler

== Production ==
=== Development ===
In March 2017, Skydance Media formed a multi-year partnership with Madrid-based animation studio Ilion Animation Studios, forming an animation division called Skydance Animation. In July, it announced Split, and it was revealed by Skydance Media CEO David Ellison that Linda Woolverton was writing the film. In January 2019, Skydance Animation hired former Pixar Animation Studios and Walt Disney Animation Studios CCO John Lasseter as Head of Animation. In April 2020, song and score composer Alan Menken announced that he was working on the project with Lasseter. The following month, Skydance officially announced that Menken had re-teamed with song lyricist Glenn Slater and executive music producer Chris Montan, all of whom had previously collaborated in the same roles with Lasseter on Tangled (2010), to work on Spellbound.

The film would be directed by Vicky Jenson, from a screenplay by Woolverton and the writing team of Lauren Hynek and Elizabeth Martin. In July 2020, it was announced that Spellbound was going to be released by Paramount Pictures until Apple TV+ acquired the distribution rights in December 2020 as part of a larger pact with Skydance Animation. Apple Studios would replace Paramount as a production company. However, in October 2023, Skydance Animation ended its deal with Apple, and later signed a multi-year deal with Netflix, which would take over distribution of the studio's future films in production, including Spellbound. In February 2024, Julia Miranda was revealed to have joined the writing staff. In June 2024, Woolverton was confirmed to be a producer and was no longer credited as a writer on the film.

=== Casting ===
In April 2022, Rachel Zegler was cast as the lead character. In June, Nicole Kidman, Javier Bardem, John Lithgow, Nathan Lane, Jenifer Lewis, André De Shields, and Jordan Fisher were added to the cast. In June 2023, Tituss Burgess joined the cast, replacing De Shields.

=== Animation ===
Animation has been provided by Skydance Animation Madrid and was also made in Los Angeles and Connecticut with portions of production done remotely during the COVID-19 pandemic.

== Marketing ==
In March 2022, it was reported that Skydance Animation made a multi-year deal with Spin Master to make toys based on the film.

== Release ==
In March 2017, it was reported that the original release was intended to be in 2019. On July 20, 2020, Paramount Pictures dated the film for November 11, 2022. On December 16, 2020, Apple TV+ entered talks to take over the distribution rights to the film, retaining its November 11 date. However, the film ended up missing its release date for unknown reasons.

A work-in-progress presentation of the film was shown at the 2023 Annecy International Animation Film Festival in June by Jenson and head of story Brian Pimental. Shortly after, the film was announced for a 2024 release. That October, Netflix took over the film's distribution rights from Apple, as part of a new multi-year deal with Skydance Animation, while retaining its 2024 release. In June 2024, Netflix announced that the film would premiere on November 22, 2024.

== Reception ==
=== Critical response ===
On the review aggregator website Rotten Tomatoes, 45% of 40 critics' reviews are positive, with an average rating of 5.4/10. The website's consensus reads: "Spellbound makes for harmless viewing thanks to its colorful animation and clever moral, but this fairy tale can't quite summon any real charm." Metacritic, which uses a weighted average, assigned the film a score of 54 out of 100, based on 12 critics, indicating "mixed or average" reviews.

=== Audience viewership ===
During the November 18–24 viewing window, Spellbound secured its #3 position in Netflix's top series, accumulating 8.5 million views within its first three days. It went up to the #2 position, garnering 15.3 million views the following week (November 25–December 1).

According to Luminate Film & TV Streaming Viewership, the film ranked as the #2 and #3 most-watched streaming original film in the U.S. for the weeks of November 22–28 and November 29–December 5, respectively.

=== Awards and nominations ===
| Award | Date of ceremony | Category | Recipient(s) | Result | Ref. |
|---|---|---|---|---|---|
| Annie Awards | February 8, 2025 | Character Design in an Animated Feature Production | Guillermo Ramíre | Nominated | |
| Annie Awards | February 8, 2025 | Storyboarding in an Animated Feature Production | Alex Relloso Horna, Carlos Zapater Oliva | Nominated | |
| Artios Awards | February 12, 2025 | Feature Animation | Jason Henkel | Nominated | |
| Children's & Family Emmy Awards | March 1–2, 2026 | Outstanding Individual Achievement in Animation – Production Design | Brett Nystul | Won | |

== Short film ==
On March 1, 2025, Netflix released a short film titled Flink's Pigeon Problems: A Magical Rescue, directed by Susan Fitzer and Brian Pimental.
