= Old Guard =

Old Guard or The Old Guard may refer to:

- Old Guard (France), units of the French Imperial Guard under Napoleon Bonaparte
- Old Guard (Australia), a right wing organisation of the 1920s and 1930s
- Old Guard (New York), a ceremonial battalion of New York City infantry veterans, founded 1826
- Old Guards (Russia), the collective term for military units serving as personal guards of the Emperor of Russia
- Bolshevik old guard
- Old Guard faction, an organized grouping in the Socialist Party of America in the early 1930s, which left in 1936 to establish the Social Democratic Federation
- The Old Guard (magazine), an American magazine published from 1863 to 1867
- Nickname of the 3rd U.S. Infantry Regiment and its
  - Old Guard Fife and Drum Corps
- Old Guard, a segment of the leather subculture
- Alter Kämpfer of the Nazi Party

== Film ==
- The Old Guard (franchise), film and graphic novel franchise
  - The Old Guard (2020 film), an American action film
  - The Old Guard 2, American action film
- The Old Guard (1934 film), an Italian film directed by Alessandro Blasetti
- The Old Guard (1960 film), French film

== See also ==
- Alter Kämpfer
