= List of awards and nominations received by Orphan Black =

Orphan Black awards and nominations
Awards and nominations
Award	Wins	Nominations

Totals (Note: Certain award groups do not simply award one winner. They acknowledge several different recipients, have runners-up, and have third place. Since this is a specific recognition and is different from losing an award, runner-up mentions are considered wins in this award tally. For simplification and to avoid errors, each award in this list has been presumed to have had a prior nomination.)
- Wins: 68
- Nominations: 140

Orphan Black is a Canadian science fiction thriller television series created by screenwriter Graeme Manson and director John Fawcett, starring Tatiana Maslany as several identical people who are clones.

== Total nominations and awards for the cast ==
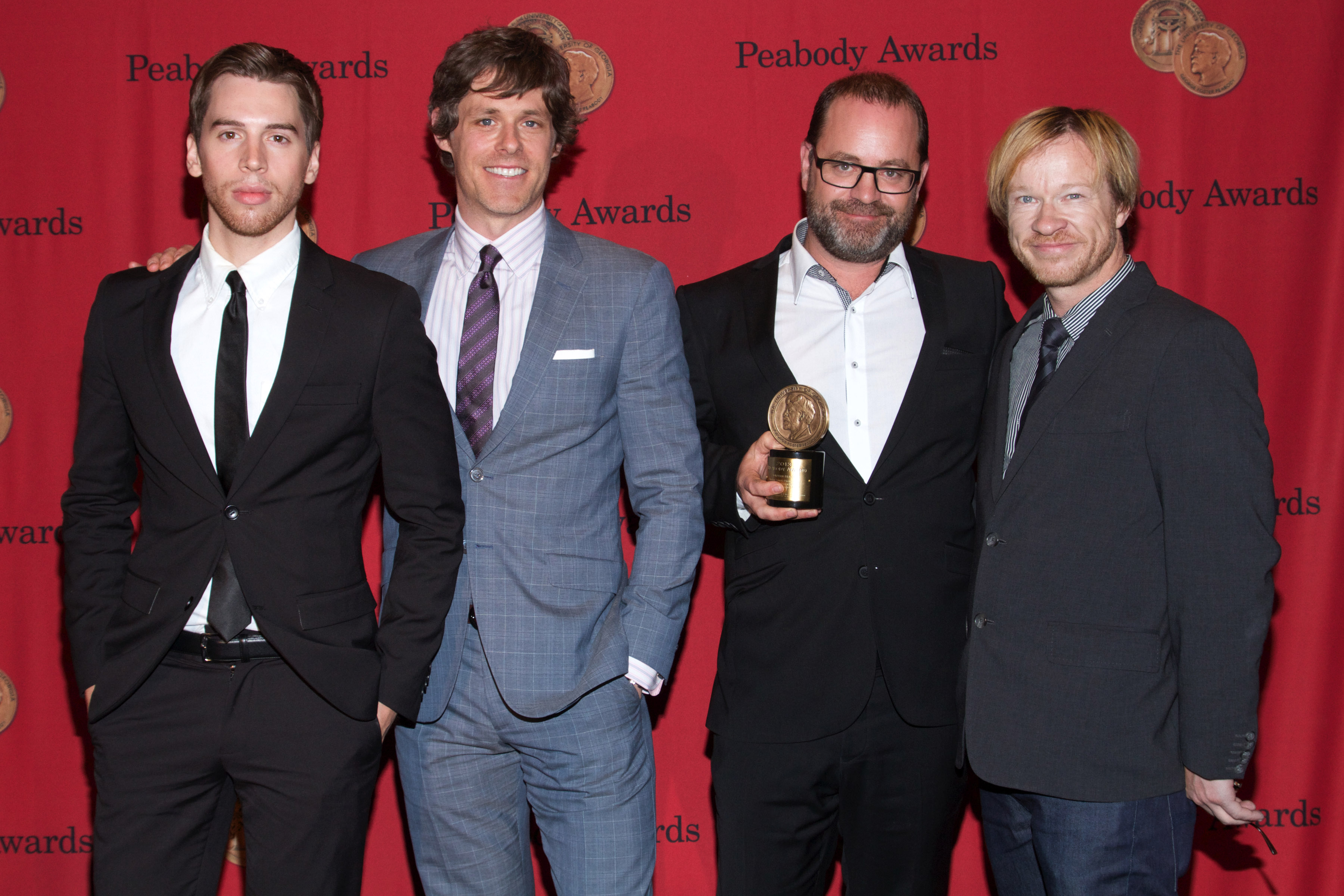
Jordan Gavaris, David Fortier, Graeme Mason, John Fawcett at the 73rd Annual Peabody Awards for Orphan Black

Actor	Nominations	Awards
Tatiana Maslany	39	23
Jordan Gavaris	7	3
Kevin Hanchard	4	1
Maria Doyle Kennedy	3	1
Gord Rand	2	0
Ari Millen	1	1
Michael Mando	1	0

== ACTRA Toronto Awards ==
The ACTRA Toronto Awards are given annually by the Alliance of Canadian Cinema, Television and Radio Artists, recognizing outstanding performances by its members. Orphan Black has one win from seven nominations.

Year	Category	Nominee	Result	Ref
2014	Outstanding Performance – Female	Tatiana Maslany (episode: "Natural Selection")	Nominated	
2015	Outstanding Performance – Female	Tatiana Maslany (episode: "By Means Which Have Never Yet Been Tried")	Won	
2015	Outstanding Performance – Male	Jordan Gavaris (episode: "Mingling Its Own Nature With It")	Nominated	
2016	Outstanding Performance – Female	Tatiana Maslany (episode: "History Yet to Be Written")	Nominated	
2016	Outstanding Performance – Male	Kevin Hanchard (episode: "Formalized, Complex and Costly")	Nominated	
2017	Outstanding Performance – Male	Gord Rand (episode: "The Redesign of Natural Objects")	Nominated	
2017	Outstanding Performance – Series Ensemble	Tatiana Maslany, Jordan Gavaris, Maria Doyle Kennedy, Kristian Bruun, Kevin Hanchard	Nominated	

== Canadian Cinema Editors Awards ==
The Canadian Cinema Editors is a non-profit organization which promotes the art and science of picture editing in all media, they host annual awards honouring professional film editors. Orphan Black received four nominations with one win.

Year	Category	Nominee	Result	Ref
2014	Best Editing in Long Form Television Series	Stephen Lawrence (episode: "Variation Under Nature")	Won	
2014	Best Editing in Long Form Television Series	D. Gillian Truster (episode: "Unconscious Selection")	Nominated	
2016	Best Editing in 1 Hour Scripted	Matthew Anas (episode: "Newer Elements of our Defense")	Nominated	
2017	Best Editing in 1 Hour Scripted	Jay Prychidny (episode: "The Scandal of Altruism")	Nominated	

== Canadian Screen Awards ==
The Canadian Screen Awards are given annually by the Academy of Canadian Cinema & Television recognizing excellence in Canadian film, English-language television, and digital media. Orphan Black has been honoured with 35 awards from 54 nominations.

Year	Category	Nominee	Result	Ref
2014	Best Performance by an Actress in a Continuing Leading Dramatic Role	Tatiana Maslany	Won	
2014	Best Dramatic Series	Claire Welland, David Fortier, Graeme Manson, Ivan Schneeberg, John Fawcett, Karen Walton, Kerry Appleyard	Won	
2014	Best Costume Design	Laurie Drew (episode: "Instinct")	Nominated	
2014	Best Direction in a Dramatic Series	John Fawcett (episode: "Endless Forms Most Beautiful")	Won	
2014	Best Photography in a Dramatic Program or Series	Aaron Morton (episode: "Endless Forms Most Beautiful")	Won	
2014	Best Writing in a Dramatic Series	Graeme Manson (episode: "Natural Selection")	Won	
2014	Best Writing in a Dramatic Series	Alex Levine (episode: "Unconscious Selection")	Nominated	
2014	Best Picture Editing in a Dramatic Program or Series	D. Gillian Truster (episode: "Unconscious Selection")	Won	
2014	Best Production Design or Art Direction in a Fiction Program or Series	Andy Loew, Ian Brock (episode: "Conditions of Existence")	Won	
2014	Best Performance by an Actor in a Featured Supporting Role in a Dramatic Program or Series	Michael Mando	Nominated	
2014	Best Performance by an Actor in a Featured Supporting Role in a Dramatic Program or Series	Kevin Hanchard	Nominated	
2014	Best Performance by an Actor in a Featured Supporting Role in a Dramatic Program or Series	Jordan Gavaris	Won	
2014	Best Performance by an Actress in a Featured Supporting Role in a Dramatic Program or Series	Maria Doyle Kennedy	Won	
2014	Best Performance by an Actress in a Guest Role, Dramatic Series	Natalie Lisinska (episode: "Variations Under Domestication")	Won	
2015	Best Dramatic Series	Kerry Appleyard, Andrea Boyd, John Fawcett, David Fortier, Alex Levine, Graeme Manson, Ivan Schneeberg, Karen Walton, Claire Welland	Won	
2015	Best Performance by an Actress in a Continuing Leading Dramatic Role	Tatiana Maslany	Won	
2015	Best Performance by an Actor in a Featured Supporting Role in a Dramatic Program or Series	Jordan Gavaris	Won	
2015	Best Direction in a Drama Series	TJ Scott (episode: "Mingling Its Own Nature With It")	Won	
2015	Best Original Music Score for a Series	Trevor Yuile (episode: "By Means Which Have Never Yet Been Tried")	Won	
2015	Best Photography in a Dramatic Program or Series	Aaron Morton (episode: "By Means Which Have Never Yet Been Tried")	Won	
2015	Best Picture Editing in a Dramatic Program or Series	D. Gillian Truster (episode: "Governed as It Were By Chance")	Won	
2015	Best Production Design or Art Direction in a Fiction Program or Series	Liz Calderhead, John Dondertman (episode: "Things Which Have Never Yet Been Done")	Won	
2015	Best Sound in a Dramatic Program or Series	Tom Bjelic, Hervig Gayer, John Laing, Dale Lennon, Rudy Michael, Stephan Traub, Marilee Yorston (episode: "By Means Which Have Never Yet Been Tried")	Nominated	
2015	Best Visual Effects	Anthony DeChellis, Eric Doiron, Nathan Larouche, Lon Molnar, Geoff D.E. Scott, Sarah Wormsbecher (episode: "By Means Which Have Never Yet Been Tried")	Nominated	
2015	Best Writing in a Dramatic Series	Graeme Manson (episode: "By Means Which Have Never Yet Been Tried")	Won	
2015	Best Writing in a Dramatic Series	Graeme Manson, Karen Walton (episode: "Governed by Sound Reason and True Religion")	Nominated	
2015	Best Achievement in Casting	Sharon Forrest, Susan Forrest (episode: "Governed by Sound Reason and True Religion")	Won	
2016	Best Performance by an Actor in a Continuing Leading Dramatic Role	Ari Millen	Won	
2016	Best Performance by an Actress in a Continuing Leading Dramatic Role	Tatiana Maslany	Won	
2016	Best Performance by an Actress in a Featured Supporting Role in a Dramatic Program or Series	Maria Doyle Kennedy	Nominated	
2016	Best Achievement in Makeup	Stephen Lynch, Sandy Sokolowski (episode: "Ruthless in Purpose, and Insidious in Method")	Won	
2016	Best Photography in a Dramatic Program or Series	Aaron Morton (episode: "Certain Agony of the Battlefield")	Won	
2016	Best Picture Editing in a Dramatic Program or Series	Matthew Anas (episode: "Newer Elements of Our Defense")	Won	
2016	Best Picture Editing in a Dramatic Program or Series	Jay Prychidny (episode: "Certain Agony of the Battlefield")	Nominated	
2016	Best Sound in a Dramatic Program or Series	Christopher Guglick, John Laing, Mark Gingras, Herwig Gayer, Orest Sushko, and Marilee Yorsten (episode: "History Yet to Be Written")	Nominated	
2016	Best Visual Effects	Geoff D.E. Scott, Sarah Wormsbecher, Lon Molnar, Eric Doiron, Nathan Larouche, Anthony DeChellis, Joel Chambers, Jason Snea, Kaiser Thomas and Jawahar Bhatti (episode: "History Yet to Be Written")	Nominated	
2016	Best Direction in a Dramatic Series	Helen Shaver (episode:Certain Agony of the Battlefield)	Nominated	
2016	Best Original Music Score for a Series	Trevor Yuile (episode:Certain Agony of the Battlefield)	Won	
2016	Best Writing in a Dramatic Series	Alex Levine (episode: "Scarred by Many Past Frustrations")	Won	
2016	Best Writing in a Dramatic Series	Graeme Manson (episode: "The Weight of This Combination")	Nominated	
2017	Best Dramatic Series	David Fortier, Ivan Schneeberg, John Fawcett, Graeme Manson, Claire Welland, Kerry Appleyard, Tatiana Maslany, Alex Levine, Peter Mohan	Won	
2017	Best Direction in a Dramatic Series	John Fawcett (episode: "Transgressive Border Crossing")	Won	
2017	Best Original Music Score for a Series	Trevor Yule (episode: "The Scandal of Altruism")	Won	
2017	Best Performance by an Actor in a Featured Supporting Role in a Dramatic Program or Series	Kevin Hanchard	Won	
2017	Best Performance by an Actress in a Continuing Leading Dramatic Role	Tatiana Maslany	Won	
2017	Best Performance in a Guest Role Dramatic Series	Gord Rand (episode: "The Antisocialism of Sex")	Nominated	
2017	Best Photography in a Dramatic Program or Series	Aaron Morton (episode: "From Dancing Mice to Psychopaths")	Won	
2017	Best Picture Editing in a Dramatic Program or Series	Jay Prychidny (episode: "The Scandal of Altruism")	Won	
2017	Best Production Design or Art Direction in a Fiction Program or Series	John Dondertman, Liz Calderhead (episode: "Human Raw Material")	Won	
2017	Best Sound in a Comedy or Dramatic Program or Series	John Laing, Dale Lennon, Tom Bjelic, Marilee Yorston, Chris Guglick, Shaun Gratto, Marco Difelice, Herwig Gayer (episode: "The Scandal of Altruism")	Nominated	
2017	Best Visual Effects	Geoff Scott, Sarah Wormsbecher, Eric Doiron, Nathan Larouche, Anthony DeChellis, Lon Molnar (episode: "From Dancing Mice to Psychopaths")	Nominated	
2017	Best Writing in a Dramatic Series	Russ Cochrane (episode: "Transgressive Border Crossing")	Nominated	
2017	Best Writing in a Dramatic Series	Aubrey Nealon (episode: "The Stigmata of Progress")	Nominated	
2017	Best Writing in a Dramatic Series	Graeme Manson (episode: "The Collapse of Nature")	Won	

== Constellation Awards ==
The Constellation Awards were a set of Canadian awards given annually for the best science fiction or fantasy works, the winners were determined by voting by the general public. Orphan Black won four awards from five nominations.

Year	Category	Nominee	Result	Ref
2014	Best Male Performance in a 2013 Science Fiction Television Episode	Jordan Gavaris (episode: "Variations Under Domestication")	Won	
2014	Best Female Performance in a 2013 Science Fiction Television Episode	Tatiana Maslany (episode: "Variations Under Domestication")	Won	
2014	Outstanding Canadian Contribution to Science Fiction Film or Television in 2013	Tatiana Maslany	Won	
2014	Best Science Fiction Television Series of 2013	Orphan Black	Won	
2014	Best Overall 2013 Science Fiction Film or Television Script	Will Pascoe (episode: "Variations Under Domestication")	Nominated	

== Critics' Choice Television Awards ==
The Critics' Choice Television Awards are presented annually by Broadcast Television Journalists Association. Orphan Black has received two awards from four nominations.

Year	Category	Nominee	Result	Ref
2013	Best Lead Actress in a Drama Series	Tatiana Maslany	Won	
2014	Best Lead Actress in a Drama Series	Tatiana Maslany	Won	
2016	Best Lead Actress in a Drama Series	Tatiana Maslany	Nominated	
2018	Best Lead Actress in a Drama Series	Tatiana Maslany	Nominated	

== Directors Guild of Canada Awards ==
The Directors Guild of Canada hosts an annual awards ceremony recognizing achievement in directing, production design, picture and sound editing.

Year	Category	Nominee	Result	Ref
2014	Best Direction Television Series	John Fawcett (episode: "Endless Forms Most Beautiful")	Won	
2014	Best Drama Television Series	John Fawcett, Anna Beben (episode: "Endless Forms Most Beautiful")	Won	
2014	Best Picture Editing – Television Series	Stephen Lawrence (episode: "Variation Under Nature")	Won	
2015	Best Drama Television Series	John Fawcett, Gina Fowler (episode: "By Means Which Have Never Yet Been Tried")	Won	
2015	Best Direction Television Series	John Fawcett (episode: "By Means Which Have Never Yet Been Tried")	Nominated	
2015	Best Direction Television Series	Helen Shaver (episode: "Ipsa Scientia Potestas Est")	Nominated	
2015	Best Picture Editing – Television Series	Jay Prychidny (episode: "Ipsa Scientia Potestas Est")	Nominated	
2016	Best Production Design – Television Series	John Dondertman (episode: "Certain Agony of the Battlefield")	Won	
2016	Best Picture Editing – Television Series	D. Gillian Truster (episode: "Scarred By Many Past Frustrations")	Won	
2016	Best Picture Editing – Television Series	Jay Prychidny (episode: "Certain Agony of the Battlefield")	Nominated	
2017	Outstanding Directorial Achievement in Dramatic Series	David Wellington (episode: "Human Raw Material")	Nominated	
2017	Best Production Design – Television Series	John Dondertman (episode: "Human Raw Material")	Won	
2017	Best Picture Editing – Television Series	Jay Prychidny (episode: "The Scandal of Altruism")	Nominated	

== Dorian Awards ==
The Dorian Awards are organized by the Gay and Lesbian Entertainment Critics Association. Orphan Black has been nominated four times.

Year	Category	Nominee	Result	Ref
2014	TV Performance of the Year – Actress	Tatiana Maslany	Nominated	
2014	Unsung TV Show of the Year	Orphan Black	Nominated	
2015	TV Performance of the Year – Actress	Tatiana Maslany	Nominated	
2015	Unsung TV Show of the Year	Orphan Black	Nominated	

== Edgar Allan Poe Awards ==
The Edgar Allan Poe Awards are presented every year by the Mystery Writers of America, they honor the best in mystery fiction, non-fiction, television, film, and theatre. Orphan Black has been nominated once.

Year	Category	Nominee	Result	Ref
2014	Best Television Episode Teleplay	Will Pascoe (episode: "Variations Under Domestication")	Nominated	

== Emmy Awards ==
The Emmy Awards recognizes excellence in television production and is considered one of the top honors in the industry. Orphan Black has earned three nominations, resulting in one award.

Year	Category	Nominee	Result	Ref
2015	Outstanding Lead Actress in a Drama Series	Tatiana Maslany	Nominated	
2016	Outstanding Lead Actress in a Drama Series	Tatiana Maslany	Won	
2018	Outstanding Lead Actress in a Drama Series	Tatiana Maslany	Nominated	

== EWwy Awards ==
The EWwys honoured the Emmy-snubbed shows and actors of the year. Orphan Black won three awards from five nominations.

Year	Category	Nominee	Result	Ref
2013	Best Actress in a Drama Series	Tatiana Maslany	Won	
2013	Best Drama Series	Orphan Black	Nominated	
2014	Best Actress in a Drama Series	Tatiana Maslany	Won	
2014	Best Supporting Actor in a Drama Series	Jordan Gavaris	Won	
2015	Best Supporting Actor in a Drama Series	Jordan Gavaris	Nominated	

== GLAAD Media Awards ==
The GLAAD Media Awards are awarded annually by the Gay & Lesbian Alliance Against Defamation. Orphan Black has three nominations.

Year	Category	Nominee	Result	Ref
2014	Outstanding Drama Series	Orphan Black	Nominated	
2015	Outstanding Drama Series	Orphan Black	Nominated	
2017	Outstanding Drama Series	Orphan Black	Nominated	

== Golden Globe Awards ==
The Golden Globe Award is an accolade bestowed by the 93 members of the Hollywood Foreign Press Association recognizing excellence in film and television, both domestic and foreign. Orphan Black has received one nomination.

Year	Category	Nominee	Result	Ref
2014	Best Performance in a Television Series – Drama Actress	Tatiana Maslany	Nominated	

== Gracie Awards ==
The Gracie Allen Awards are awarded annually, recognizing exemplary programming created by women, for women and about women in all facets of media and entertainment. Orphan Black has one award.

Year	Category	Nominee	Result	Ref
2014	Outstanding Female Actor in a Breakthrough Role	Tatiana Maslany	Won	

== Hugo Awards ==
The Hugo Awards are a set of awards given annually for the best science fiction or fantasy works. Orphan Black has accepted one award from two nominations.

Year	Category	Nominee	Result	Ref
2014	Best Dramatic Presentation, Short Form	Will Pascoe, John Fawcett (episode: "Variations Under Domestication")	Nominated	
2015	Best Dramatic Presentation, Short Form	Graeme Manson, John Fawcett (episode: "By Means Which Have Never Yet Been Tried")	Won	

== IGN Awards ==
The IGN Awards are chosen annually by the IGN editors, honoring the best in film, television, games, comics and anime. Orphan Black has two wins from eight nominations.

Year	Category	Nominee	Result	Ref
2013	Best TV Actress	Tatiana Maslany	Won	
2013	Best TV Sci-Fi Series	Orphan Black	Won	
2013	Best TV Series	Orphan Black	Nominated	
2013	Best New TV Series	Orphan Black	Nominated	
2014	Best TV Sci-Fi Series	Orphan Black	Nominated	
2014	Best TV Actress	Tatiana Maslany	Nominated	
2015	Best TV Sci-Fi Series	Orphan Black	Nominated	
2015	Best TV Actress	Tatiana Maslany	Nominated	

== IGN People's Choice Awards ==
The IGN People's Choice Awards are voted on annually by the general public, they honor the best in film, television, games, comics and anime. Orphan Black has one award.

Year	Category	Nominee	Result	Ref
2014	Best TV Actress	Tatiana Maslany	Won	

== Peabody Awards ==
The Peabody Awards honor the most powerful, enlightening, and invigorating stories in television, radio, and online media. Orphan Black has received one award.

Year	Category	Nominee	Result	Ref
2014	Peabody Award	Orphan Black	Won	

== People's Choice Awards ==
The People's Choice Awards is an American awards show recognizing the people and the work of popular culture. The show has been held annually since 1975 and is voted on by the general public. Orphan Black has been nominated twice.

Year	Category	Nominee	Result	Ref
2014	Favorite Sci-Fi/Fantasy Actress	Tatiana Maslany	Nominated	
2017	Favorite Cable Sci-Fi/Fantasy TV Show	Orphan Black	Nominated	

== Prix Aurora Awards ==
The Prix Aurora Awards are annual Canadian awards given out to the best works of science fiction and fantasy.

Year	Category	Nominee	Result	Ref
2016	Best Visual Presentation	John Fawcett and Graeme Manson	Won	
2017	Best Visual Presentation	John Fawcett and Graeme Manson	Nominated	
2018	Best Visual Presentation	John Fawcett and Graeme Manson	Nominated	

== Satellite Awards ==
The Satellite Awards are a set of annual awards given by the International Press Academy. Orphan Black has four nominations.

Year	Category	Nominee	Result	Ref
2014	Best Television series or Miniseries, Genre	Orphan Black	Nominated	
2014	Best Actress in a Drama Series	Tatiana Maslany	Nominated	
2017	Best Actress in a Series – Drama or Genre	Tatiana Maslany	Nominated	
2017	Best Television Series – Genre	Orphan Black	Nominated	

== Screen Actors Guild Awards ==
The Screen Actors Guild Awards are organized by the Screen Actors Guild‐American Federation of Television and Radio Artists. First awarded in 1995, the awards aim to recognize excellent achievements in film and television. Orphan Black has one nomination.

Year	Category	Nominee	Result	Ref
2015	Outstanding Performance by a Female Actor in a Drama Series	Tatiana Maslany	Nominated	

== TCA Awards ==
The members of the Television Critics Association vote annually for outstanding achievements in television. Orphan Black has one award from three nominations.

Year	Category	Nominee	Result	Ref
2013	Individual Achievement in Drama	Tatiana Maslany	Won	
2013	Outstanding New Program	Orphan Black	Nominated	
2014	Individual Achievement in Drama	Tatiana Maslany	Nominated	

== Tubey Awards ==
Year	Category	Nominee	Result	Ref
2013	Most Underrated Show	Orphan Black	Won	

== TV Guide Awards ==
The TV Guide Awards are annual awards created by the editors of TV Guide magazine, as a readers poll to honor outstanding programs and performers in the American television industry. Orphan Black has been nominated twice.

Year	Category	Nominee	Result	Ref
2014	Favorite Sci-Fi/Fantasy Show	Orphan Black	Nominated	
2014	Favorite Actress	Tatiana Maslany	Nominated	

== Writers Guild of Canada Awards ==
The Writers Guild of Canada represents English-language screenwriters in Canada, their annual awards honour excellence in screenwriting. Orphan Black has earned three awards from five nominations.

Year	Category	Nominee	Result	Ref
2014	Television Drama	Tony Elliott (episode: "Parts Developed in an Unusual Manner")	Nominated	
2014	Television Drama	Alex Levine (episode: "Unconscious Selection")	Nominated	
2014	Television Drama	Will Pascoe (episode: "Variations Under Domestication")	Won	
2015	Television Drama	Tony Elliott (episode: "Ipsa Scientia Potestas Est")	Won	
2016	Television Drama	Russ Cochrane (episode: "Newer Elements of Our Defense")	Won	

== Young Artist Awards ==
The Young Artist Awards are awarded annually to young actors in film and television. Orphan Black has received one nomination.

Year	Category	Nominee	Result	Ref
2015	Best Performance in a TV Series – Recurring Young Actress 17–21	Zoé De Grand Maison	Nominated	

== Young Hollywood Awards ==
The Young Hollywood Awards were awards presented annually which honor the year's biggest achievements in pop music, movies, sports, television, fashion and more, as voted on by teenagers and young adults. Orphan Black has one award.

Year	Category	Nominee	Result	Ref
2013	Breakthrough Performance — Female	Tatiana Maslany	Won	
