= The Old Guard (franchise) =

Graphic novel & film franchise

- Created by: Greg Rucka; Leandro Fernández
- Original work: The Old Guard: Opening Fire (2017)

Print publications
- Graphic novels: The Old Guard: Opening Fire (2017); The Old Guard: Force Multiplied (2019–20); The Old Guard: Tales Through Time (2020–21)

Films and television
- Films: The Old Guard (2020); The Old Guard 2 (2025)

Audio
- Soundtrack: The Old Guard (Music from the Netflix film)

The Old Guard is a sci-fi media franchise. It started as a series of comic books created by Greg Rucka and Leandro Fernández and published by Image Comics. It has released over 16 issues from three series. The series follows a group of immortal soldiers, known as The Old Guard, led by a woman named Andromache of Scythia (Andy) who has been alive for several thousand years.

A film adaptation from Netflix and Skydance Media was made in 2020, with a sequel released on July 2nd, 2025.

== Background ==
The series follows a group of soldiers who have been given the gift of immortality. Led by Andromache of Scythia (whom her comrades call Andy) they ply their trade for those who can find and afford their services. But in the 21st century, immortality is a hard secret to keep, and they learn that there are many fates worse than death.

The Old Guard was named after the 3rd U.S. Infantry Regiment, which was formed in 1784. Rucka wanted the story to be an adventure about invincible characters, but he decided to make them immortal, comparing them to Looney Tunes cartoon characters who are not sidelined by injuries. Rucka said that halfway through the process of creating The Old Guard, he realized it was an attempt to rationalize the necessity of death after his father's recent passing.

== Comic book series ==
=== The Old Guard: Opening Fire (2017) ===
The Old Guard is the first chapter of the series, with five issues released from February 22, 2017, to June 21, 2017. The full version was released on August 30, 2017. It was written by Greg Rucka and illustrated by Leandro Fernández. A Woman's History Month cover was made by Nicola Scott who was later an artist on part of the third series.

=== The Old Guard: Force Multiplied (2019–20) ===
The Old Guard: Force Multiplied is the second chapter of the series and was released with five issues on December 18, 2019 to July 15, 2020. The full version was released on September 16, 2020.

=== The Old Guard: Tales Through Time (2020–21) ===
The Old Guard: Tales Through Time is the third chapter of the series and was released with six issues on April 21, 2021 to September 22, 2021. The full version was released on December 15, 2021. Unlike the last two chapters, this series was more of an anthology series made by various writers like Brian Michael Bendis, Kelly Sue DeConnick, Matt Fraction, Vita Ayala, Jason Aaron, David F. Walker, and artists like Valentine De Landro, Nicola Scott, Michael Avon Oeming, Rafael Albuquerque, Mike Henderson, Matthew Clark, and Kano.

== Characters ==
- Andy – a 6,000+ year old woman known as Andromache of Scythia who is the leader of The Old Guard.
- Nile Freeman – a former Marine Corps corporal from Chicago and current member of the Old Guard.
- Booker – a thief from late 1800s France who was known as Sebastian Le Livre.
- Joe – an artist from North Africa who was known as Yusuf al-Kaysani and is in a relationship with Nicky, whom he met while fighting on opposite sides during the Crusades, killing each other hundreds of times over the centuries before falling in love.
- Nicky – a Catholic priest from Italy who was known as Nicolò di Genoa, who is in a relationship with Joe.
- Noriko/Quỳnh – Andy’s former love interest and an immortal who nearly died from being drowned. In the novel series, she was a Japanese fighter known as Noriko. For the film series, her character was changed to a Vietnamese fighter named Quỳnh, portrayed by Veronica Ngô.
- James Copley – a former CIA operative who identifies the Old Guard by tracking them through history.

== Critical reception ==
The series has received generally positive reviews, with praise for the premise, artwork, and LGBTQ+ representation, but with some criticism for its pacing.

== Film adaptations ==
Film	U.S. release date	Directed by	Screenplay by	Story by	Produced by	Music by	Cinematography	Edited by	Studio(s)	Distributed by	Status
The Old Guard	July 10, 2020	Gina Prince-Bythewood	Greg Rucka	Greg Rucka	David Ellison, Dana Goldberg, Don Granger, Charlize Theron, A.J. Dix, Beth Kono and Marc Evans	Volker Bertelmann and Dustin O'Halloran	Tami Reiker and Barry Ackroyd	Terilyn A. Shropshire	Skydance Media; Denver and Delilah Productions; Marc Evans Productions	Netflix	Released
The Old Guard 2	July 2, 2025	Victoria Mahoney	Greg Rucka and Sarah L. Walker	Greg Rucka	David Ellison, Dana Goldberg, Don Granger, Charlize Theron, A.J. Dix, Beth Kono and Marc Evans	Steffen Thum and Ruth Barrett	Barry Ackroyd	Matthew Schmidt	Skydance Media; Denver and Delilah Productions; Marc Evans Productions	Netflix	Released

=== The Old Guard (2020) ===
The Old Guard was released on July 10, 2020, on Netflix and has been receiving generally positive reviews from critics, with praise for the action sequences and Theron's performance.

In March 2017, Skydance Media picked up the rights to adapt the comic The Old Guard into a film, with Rucka's contract stipulating that a major scene highlighting the romance between the characters Joe and Nicky from the comic book must also be in the film adaptation.

In July 2018, they hired Gina Prince-Bythewood to direct with Rucka adapting his comic book to screenplay and Skydance's David Ellison, Dana Goldberg and Don Granger producing. With a budget of about $70 million, Prince-Bythewood became the first black woman to direct a big-budget comic book film. In March 2019, Netflix picked up worldwide rights to the film and agreed to finance it with Skydance. Charlize Theron joined the film and also co-producing with Beth Kono, A.J. Dix, Marc Evans. KiKi Layne was confirmed to star in the film after Netflix picked up the rights.

=== The Old Guard 2 (2025) ===
It was reported on January 27, 2021 that Netflix had greenlit a sequel. On August 26, it was announced that Victoria Mahoney would replace Prince-Bythewood as director for the sequel. Theron, Layne, Schoenaerts, Kenzari, Marinelli, Ngo, and Ejiofor are to reprise their respective roles from the original movie. In June 2022, Uma Thurman and Henry Golding were cast in undisclosed roles later revealed to be as Discord and Tuah respectively.
