= Tatiana Maslany =

Canadian actress (born 1985)

- Maslany in 2026
- Born: Tatiana Gabriele Maslany; September 22, 1985 (age 41); Regina, Saskatchewan, Canada
- Education: University of Regina
- Occupation: Actress
- Years active: 1995–present
- Spouse: Brendan Hines (m. 2022)
- Relatives: Daniel Maslany (brother)

Tatiana Gabriele Maslany (/mæsˈlæni/ mas-LAN-ee; born September 22, 1985) is a Canadian actress. She rose to prominence for playing multiple characters in the science-fiction thriller television series Orphan Black (2013–2017), which won her a Primetime Emmy Award (2016) and five Canadian Screen Awards (2014–2018). Maslany is the first Canadian to win an Emmy in a major dramatic category for acting in a Canadian series.

Maslany also appeared in television series such as Heartland (2008–2010), The Nativity (2010), Being Erica (2009–2011), Perry Mason (2020), and She-Hulk: Attorney at Law (2022) in the lead role of Jennifer Walters / She-Hulk.

For starring in the romantic drama film The Other Half (2016), Maslany won the Canadian Screen Award for Best Actress. Her other notable films include Diary of the Dead (2007), Eastern Promises (2007), The Vow (2012), Picture Day (2012), Cas and Dylan (2013), Woman in Gold (2015), Stronger (2017), Destroyer (2018), Pink Wall (2019), and The Monkey (2025).

== Early life ==
Maslany was born in Regina, Saskatchewan, the daughter of Daniel Maslany, a woodworker, and Renate (née Kratz), a French–English translator and interpreter. She has two younger brothers, including fellow actor Daniel Maslany. She has Austrian, German, Polish, Romanian, and Ukrainian ancestry. For elementary school, Maslany was in French immersion and was taught in German by her mother before learning English. Additionally, her maternal grandparents spoke German around her as a child. She also speaks some Spanish. She has danced since age four and started community theatre and musicals at the age of nine.

Maslany attended Dr. Martin LeBoldus High School, where she participated in school productions and improvisation, and graduated in 2003. While attending high school, she found paying acting jobs that allowed her to travel all over Canada with her parents' approval. She would work for a few months at a time and then return to school in Regina. She stated, "It wasn't an easy transition. I felt a little outside of it. Outside of both experiences, really."

After completing high school, she took a gap year before entering the University of Regina, studying German, ancient Greek, philosophy, psychology, and film. She dropped out after half a semester. She spent some time doing theatre performances and travelling before settling in Toronto, Ontario, at the age of 20.

== Career ==
Maslany was one of the stars of the 2002 Canadian television series 2030 CE. She appeared as the character Ghost in the 2004 film Ginger Snaps 2: Unleashed. She performed comedic improvisation for 10 years; participated in improvisational theatre, including the Canadian Improv Games; and has since become a member of the General Fools Improvisational Theatre. She is a certified improvisation trainer.

In 2007, Maslany appeared in The Messengers and had a recurring role for three seasons on the CBC series Heartland. During 2008, she had a recurring role on Instant Star, provided the voice of Tatiana in Eastern Promises, and had a lead role in the Hallmark Channel film An Old Fashioned Thanksgiving. In September 2008, she portrayed a kidnapping victim in the Canadian series Flashpoint.

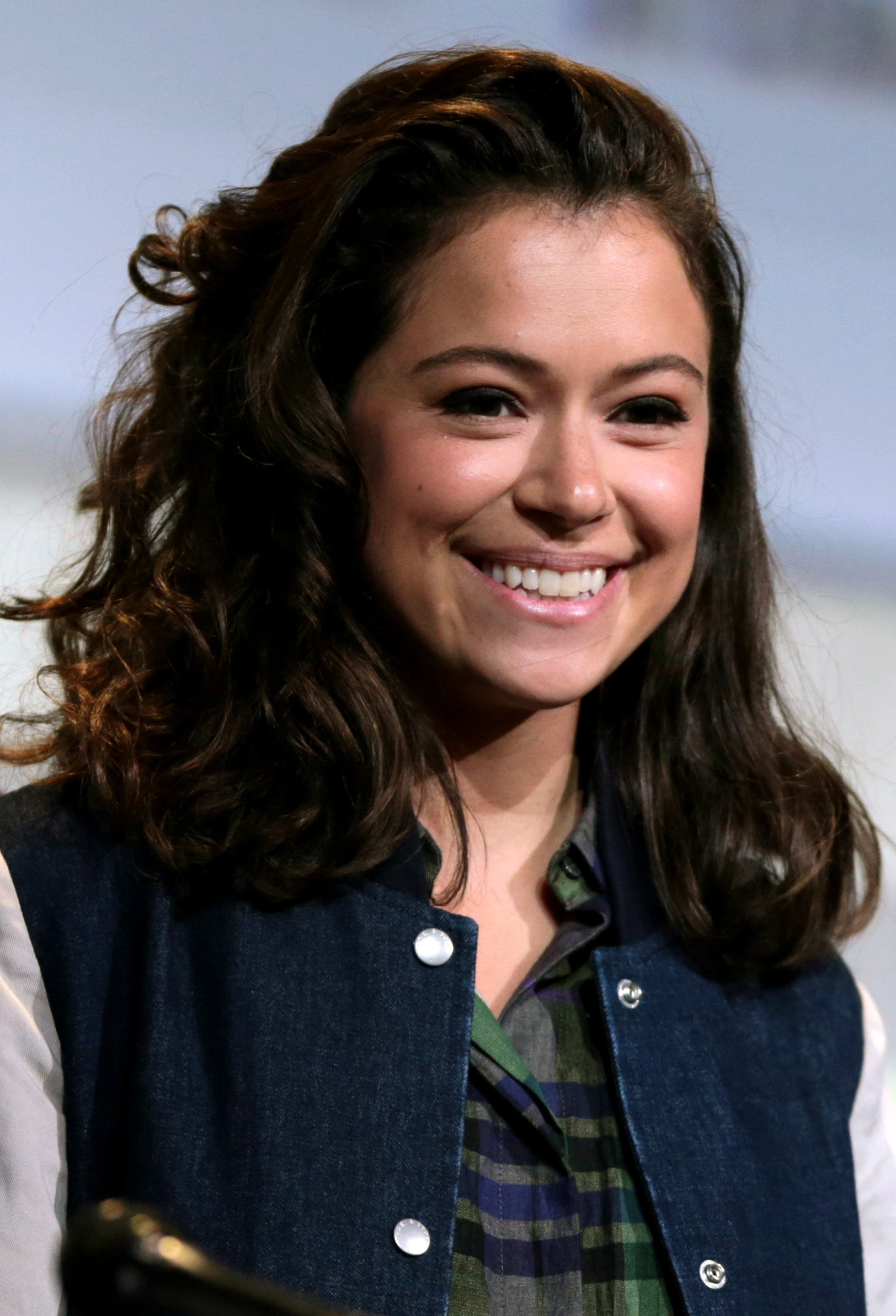
Maslany in 2016

Maslany appeared in the second season of the Canadian television series Being Erica in 2010. Also in 2010, she appeared as the protagonist Mary, the mother of Jesus, in the British four-part television series The Nativity. Her role in Grown Up Movie Star earned Maslany a special jury break-out role award at the 2010 Sundance Film Festival. Also in 2010, she appeared in one episode of The Listener and the direct-to-video film Hardwired. In late 2011, she co-starred in the film adaptation of John Sandford's Certain Prey. In 2012, Maslany appeared as lead character Claire in Picture Day, for which she won a Phillip Borsos Award for Best Performance at the 2012 Whistler Film Festival. Also in 2012, she played the character of Sister Meir in the historical fiction mini-series World Without End.

From 2013 to 2017, Maslany starred in the BBC America and Space original series Orphan Black. She played the lead character, Sarah Manning, and Sarah's cohort of clones. Maslany won two Critics' Choice Television Awards and one TCA Award for her performance in the series. She was also nominated for a Golden Globe Award for Best Actress and in 2015, she received a nomination for an Emmy Award for her performance. She was again nominated in 2016 and won the category. Maslany received a nomination for Best Lead Actress in a Drama Series at the 7th Critics' Choice Television Awards, her third total nomination from the Broadcast Television Journalists Association. The Guardian praised Maslany's performance in the series, calling it "Olympic-level acting" and praising her ability to play a series of clones who interact seamlessly with each other. In 2013, Maslany guest starred in a two-episode arc of Parks and Recreation. She portrayed the lead in the independent film Cas and Dylan, for which she won a Phillip Borsos Award for Best Performance at the 2013 Whistler Film Festival.

The 2013 Juno Award ceremonies were held in Regina, Maslany's home town, and Maslany was one of the presenters. Maslany guest starred on the season 39 finale of Saturday Night Live and played the character Bridget in the episode's second digital short entitled "Hugs". Maslany co-starred in the 2015 film Woman in Gold as a younger version of Maria Altmann, Helen Mirren's character. She mostly spoke German in the film.

Maslany starred in the independent film The Other Half with her then-partner Tom Cullen. It premiered at South by Southwest on March 12, 2016. Maslany played the lead role in the 2016 drama film Two Lovers and a Bear. The film follows the two characters as they come together in Apex, Iqaluit, to find peace in their lives. In the 2017 film Stronger, Maslany starred as Erin Hurley, the love interest of Jeff Bauman, a victim of the Boston Marathon bombing.

Maslany was cast as a series regular in the 2018 drama series Pose but was replaced by Charlayne Woodard. She starred in the crime thriller film Destroyer, which premiered at the Telluride Film Festival in August 2018. She next starred in the Broadway production of Network in 2019. Maslany starred as Sister Alice in the HBO period drama miniseries Perry Mason, which premiered in June 2020. In September 2020, Maslany was cast in the lead role of Jennifer Walters / She-Hulk for the Disney+ TV series She-Hulk: Attorney at Law, set in the Marvel Cinematic Universe. She was set to star in AMC's six-episode series Invitation to a Bonfire, a psychological thriller set in the 1930s at an all-girls boarding school based on a 2018 novel by Adrienne Celt, but production on the series was cancelled by the network for content tax write-downs in January 2023, with apparently four episodes shot.

In 2025, she starred in the Osgood Perkins–directed horror films The Monkey and Keeper.

Maslany also stars in the thriller television series Maximum Pleasure Guaranteed, which premiered on Apple TV on May 20, 2026.

== Personal life ==
In 2022, Maslany married actor Brendan Hines. She has resided in Los Angeles since 2017.

== Politics ==
At a 2024 event celebrating her induction into Canada's Walk of Fame, Maslany criticized the Saskatchewan government's law requiring parental consent to use students' preferred names and pronouns, and donated $10,000 to a Regina transitional home for LGBTQ youth. At the same event, Maslany denounced the Gaza genocide and called for a ceasefire.

== Acting credits ==
=== Film ===
Key
| † | Denotes films that have not yet been released |

List of Tatiana Maslany film roles
| Year | Title | Role | Notes |
|---|---|---|---|
| 1999 | Subterranean Passage | Voice | |
| 2004 | Ginger Snaps 2: Unleashed | Ghost | |
| 2007 | The Messengers | Lindsay Rollins | |
| 2007 | Eastern Promises | Tatiana | Voice |
| 2007 | Diary of the Dead | Mary Dexter | |
| 2007 | Late Fragment | India | |
| 2008 | Flash of Genius | Older Kathy | |
| 2009 | Defendor | Olga | |
| 2009 | Grown Up Movie Star | Ruby | |
| 2009 | Hardwired | Punk Red | |
| 2010 | In Redemption | Margaret | |
| 2010 | Toilet | Lisa | |
| 2011 | The Entitled | Jenna | |
| 2011 | Violet & Daisy | April | |
| 2012 | The Vow | Lily | |
| 2012 | Picture Day | Claire | |
| 2012 | Blood Pressure | Kat | |
| 2014 | Cas and Dylan | Dylan Morgan | |
| 2015 | Woman in Gold | Young Maria Altmann | |
| 2016 | The Other Half | Emily | |
| 2016 | Two Lovers and a Bear | Lucy | |
| 2017 | Stronger | Erin Hurley | |
| 2017 | Souls of Totality | Lady 18 | Short film |
| 2018 | Destroyer | Petra | |
| 2019 | Pink Wall | Jenna Delancey | |
| 2021 | Trollhunters: Rise of the Titans | Queen Aja Tarron | Voice |
| 2023 | Butterfly Tale | Jennifer | Voice |
| 2025 | The Monkey | Lois Shelborn | |
| 2025 | Keeper | Liz | Also executive producer |
| 2026 | The Only Living Pickpocket in New York | Kelly | |
| 2026 | How Brief | Sister-in-law | Short film |
| 2026 | A Statement † | Edith Brown Weiss | Completed |
| TBA | The Young People † | TBA | Post-production |
| TBA | Any Other Night † | Maggie | Post-production |
| TBA | Green Bank † | TBA | Post-production |

=== Television ===
List of Tatiana Maslany television roles
| Year | Title | Role | Notes |
|---|---|---|---|
| 1997–2002 | Incredible Story Studios | Various | 2 episodes |
| 2002–2003 | 2030 CE | Rome Greyson | Main role |
| 2004–2006 | Renegadepress.com | Melanie | 4 episodes |
| 2005 | Dawn Anna | Lauren "Lulu" Dawn Townsend (age 12) | Television film |
| 2006 | Booky Makes Her Mark | Beatrice "Booky" Thomson | Television film |
| 2006 | Prairie Giant | Tommy's doctor's receptionist | 2 episodes |
| 2006 | Trapped! | Gwen | Television film |
| 2007 | Redemption SK | Margaret | Miniseries |
| 2007 | The Robber Bride | Augusta | Television film |
| 2007 | Sabbatical | Gwyneth Marlowe | Television film |
| 2007 | Stir of Echoes: The Homecoming | Sammi | Television film |
| 2008 | Flashpoint | Penny | Episode: "Planets Aligned" |
| 2008 | Instant Star | Zeppelin Dyer | Recurring role (season 4) |
| 2008 | An Old Fashioned Thanksgiving | Mathilda Bassett | Television film |
| 2008 | Would Be Kings | Reese | 2 episodes |
| 2008–2010 | Heartland | Kit Bailey | Recurring role (seasons 2–4) |
| 2009 | The Listener | Hannah Simmons | Episode: "One Way or Another" |
| 2009–2011 | Being Erica | Sarah Wexler | 4 episodes |
| 2010 | Bloodletting & Miraculous Cures | Janice | Episode: "All Souls" |
| 2010 | Cra$h & Burn | Lindsay | Episode: "Closure" |
| 2010 | The Nativity | Mary | 4 episodes |
| 2011 | Alphas | Tracy Beaumont | Episode: "Anger Management" |
| 2011 | Certain Prey | Clara Rinker | Television film |
| 2012 | World Without End | Sister Mair | Recurring role; miniseries |
| 2013 | Cracked | Haley Coturno / Isabel Ann Fergus | Episode: "Spirited Away" |
| 2013 | Parks and Recreation | Nadia Stasky | 2 episodes |
| 2013–2014 | Captain Canuck | Redcoat | Voice, 4 episodes |
| 2013–2017 | Orphan Black | Sarah Manning / Elizabeth Childs / Alison Hendrix / Cosima Niehaus / Helena / Rachel Duncan / various | Main role; also producer (seasons 3–5) |
| 2015 | BoJack Horseman | Mia McKibbin | Voice, episode: "Let's Find Out" |
| 2016 | Robot Chicken | Barbie / Flight Attendant | Voice, episode: "Hopefully Salt" |
| 2018 | Animals | Sherman | Voice, episode: "Roachella" |
| 2018 | Drunk History | Emmeline Pankhurst | Episode: "Civil Rights" |
| 2018 | Trollhunters: Tales of Arcadia | Queen Aja Tarron | 2 episodes |
| 2018–2019 | 3Below: Tales of Arcadia | Queen Aja Tarron / Queen Coranda | Voice, main role |
| 2020 | Perry Mason | Alice McKeegan | Main role |
| 2021 | The Harper House | Ollie Harper | Voice, main role |
| 2022 | Bite Size Halloween | Dana Capgras | Episode: "Snatched" |
| 2022 | She-Hulk: Attorney at Law | Jennifer Walters / She-Hulk | Main role |
| 2022 | Marvel Studios: Assembled | Herself | Episode: "The Making of She-Hulk: Attorney at Law" |
| 2023–present | Invincible | Queen Lizard / Queen Aquaria / Telia / GDA Agent #1 / Viltrumites / Elia | Voices; recurring role |
| 2024 | The Boulet Brothers' Dragula | Herself (guest judge) | Episode: "Holiday of Horrors" |
| 2025 | Maclunkey Treasure Island: A Live Staged Reading of Star Wars – A New Hope | Princess Leia Organa | Television film |
| 2026 | Star Trek: Starfleet Academy | Anisha Mir | Recurring role |
| 2026 | Maximum Pleasure Guaranteed | Paula | Main role |

=== Theatre ===
List of Tatiana Maslany theatrical roles
| Year | Title | Role | Venue | Ref. |
|---|---|---|---|---|
| 1995 | Oliver! | Orphan | Regina Summer Stage | |
| 2003–2004 | The Secret Garden | Mary | Globe Theatre, Regina | |
| 2006 | George Dandin | Angel | Globe Theatre, Regina | |
| 2007 | A Christmas Carol | Belle / Agnes / Debtor's Wife / Fan / Belinda | Globe Theatre, Regina | |
| 2009 | Dog Sees God: Confessions of a Teenage Blockhead | CB's Sister | Six Degrees Theatre, Toronto | |
| 2012 | Other People | Petra | Tank House Theatre, Toronto | |
| 2018 | Mary Page Marlowe | Mary (ages 27 and 36) | Second Stage Theater, New York City | |
| 2018–2019 | Network | Diana Christensen | Belasco Theatre, Broadway | |
| 2023 | Grey House | Max | Lyceum Theatre, Broadway | |
| 2024 | Pre-Existing Condition | A | Connelly Theater, Off-Broadway | |
| 2026 | Rhinoceros | Daisy | American Repertory Theater, Cambridge, Massachusetts | |
| 2027 | Rhinoceros | Daisy | Todd Haimes Theatre, Broadway | |

=== Music videos ===
List of Tatiana Maslany music video roles
| Year | Song | Artist |
|---|---|---|
| 2014 | "Hugs" | The Lonely Island |
| 2015 | "You Don't Know Me" | Son Lux |
| 2015 | "You Don't Know Me (Jailo Remix)" | Son Lux |
| 2018 | "All Directions" | Son Lux |

=== Video games ===
List of Tatiana Maslany video game roles
| Year | Title | Role |
|---|---|---|
| 2017 | Orphan Black: The Game | Sarah Manning |
| 2020 | Trollhunters: Defenders of Arcadia | Aja |

=== Audio books ===
List of Tatiana Maslany audio book roles
| Year | Title | Role | Notes | Ref. |
|---|---|---|---|---|
| 2015 | Locke & Key | Dodge | 13-hour audio drama | |
| 2018 | The Hunger Games | Katniss Everdeen (narrator) | 10-hour young adult fiction | |
| 2019 | Catching Fire | Katniss Everdeen (narrator) | 11-hour young adult fiction | |
| 2019 | Mockingjay | Katniss Everdeen (narrator) | 11-hour young adult fiction | |
| 2019–2022 | Orphan Black: The Next Chapter | Narrator | 20-episode audio drama | |

=== Podcasts ===
List of Tatiana Maslany podcast appearances
| Year | Title | Role | Episodes |
|---|---|---|---|
| 2015 | How Did This Get Made? | Herself | 120: "Masters of the Universe" |
| 2015–2026 | Comedy Bang! Bang! | Herself / various | 377: "Good Night In The Morning" |
| 2015–2026 | Comedy Bang! Bang! | Herself / various | 446: "Scrounging and Lounging" |
| 2015–2026 | Comedy Bang! Bang! | Herself / various | 478: "Spank Me With A Feather!" |
| 2015–2026 | Comedy Bang! Bang! | Herself / various | 536: "Live from SXSW 2018" |
| 2015–2026 | Comedy Bang! Bang! | Herself / various | 615: "The Chastman Family" |
| 2015–2026 | Comedy Bang! Bang! | Herself / various | 770: "She-Garbage People" |
| 2015–2026 | Comedy Bang! Bang! | Herself / various | 860: "The Letter D" |
| 2015–2026 | Comedy Bang! Bang! | Herself / various | 887: "Bidi Bidi Bugle Boy Bumbalee-Bee" |
| 2015–2026 | Comedy Bang! Bang! | Herself / various | 948: "A Coy Boy and a Soy Boy" |
| 2015–2026 | Comedy Bang! Bang! | Herself / various | 966: "She's Back, Back in the MCU" |
| 2016 | The Wandering Wolf | Herself | 118 |
| 2016 | Unqualified | Herself | 34 (two-part episode) |
| 2017 | Spontaneanation | Herself | 110: "The Manager's Office of a Miniature Golf Course" |
| 2019 | Hollywood Handbook | Herself | 321: "Tatiana Maslany, Our Close Friend" |
| 2020 | We Have To Stop Talkin' TMNT On CBB | Herself | 5: "TMNT W/ Tatiana Maslany and Kristian Bruun" |
| 2021–2025 | Scott Hasn't Seen | Herself | 10: "White Chicks (2004) w/ Tatiana Maslany" |
| 2021–2025 | Scott Hasn't Seen | Herself | 214: "A Woman Under the Influence (1974) w/ Tatiana Maslany" |
| 2022 | Power Trip | Jane | All episodes (star and executive producer) |
| 2023–2024 | Blank Check with Griffin & David | Herself | 441: "Decision to Leave" |
| 2023–2024 | Blank Check with Griffin & David | Herself | 498: "Wild at Heart" |

== Awards and nominations ==
| Association | Year (Note: Where available, the "Year" value is linked to the article for that specific ceremony.) | Category | Work | Result | Ref. |
|---|---|---|---|---|---|
| Actor Awards | 2015 | Outstanding Performance by a Female Actor in a Drama Series | Orphan Black | Nominated | |
| ACTRA Awards | 2013 | Outstanding Performance – Female | Picture Day | Won | |
| ACTRA Awards | 2014 | Outstanding Performance – Female | Orphan Black | Nominated | |
| ACTRA Awards | 2015 | Outstanding Performance – Female | Orphan Black | Won | |
| ACTRA Awards | 2016 | Outstanding Performance – Female | Orphan Black | Nominated | |
| ACTRA Awards | 2017 | Outstanding Performance – Female | Two Lovers and a Bear | Nominated | |
| Astra TV Awards | 2024 | Best Actress in a Streaming Series, Comedy | She-Hulk: Attorney at Law | Nominated | |
| Canadian Screen Awards | 2014 | Best Performance by an Actress in a Leading Dramatic Role | Orphan Black | Won | |
| Canadian Screen Awards | 2014 | Best Performance by an Actress in a Leading Role | Cas and Dylan | Nominated | |
| Canadian Screen Awards | 2015 | Best Performance by an Actress in a Leading Dramatic Role | Orphan Black | Won | |
| Canadian Screen Awards | 2016 | Best Performance by an Actress in a Leading Dramatic Role | Orphan Black | Won | |
| Canadian Screen Awards | 2017 | Best Performance by an Actress in a Leading Dramatic Role | Orphan Black | Won | |
| Canadian Screen Awards | 2017 | Best Performance by an Actress in a Leading Role | The Other Half | Won | |
| Canadian Screen Awards | 2017 | Best Television Series – Drama | Orphan Black | Nominated | |
| Constellation Awards | 2014 | Best Female Performance in a 2013 Science Fiction Television Episode | Orphan Black | Won | |
| Constellation Awards | 2014 | Outstanding Canadian Contribution to Science Fiction Film or Television in 2013 | Orphan Black | Won | |
| Critics' Choice Super Awards | 2023 | Best Actress in a Superhero Series | She-Hulk: Attorney at Law | Won | |
| Critics' Choice Television Awards | 2013 | Best Lead Actress in a Drama Series | Orphan Black | Won | |
| Critics' Choice Television Awards | 2014 | Best Lead Actress in a Drama Series | Orphan Black | Won | |
| Critics' Choice Television Awards | 2016 | Best Lead Actress in a Drama Series | Orphan Black | Nominated | |
| Critics' Choice Television Awards | 2017 | Best Lead Actress in a Drama Series | Orphan Black | Nominated | |
| Gemini Awards | 2005 | Best Performance in a Children's or Youth Program or Series | Renegadepress.com | Nominated | |
| Gemini Awards | 2009 | Best Performance by an Actress in a Guest Role, Dramatic Series | Flashpoint | Won | |
| Gemini Awards | 2010 | Best Performance by an Actress in a Guest Role, Dramatic Series | Bloodletting & Miraculous Cures | Won | |
| Genie Awards | 2010 | Best Performance by an Actress in a Leading Role | Grown Up Movie Star | Nominated | |
| Golden Globes Awards | 2014 | Best Actress – Television Series Drama | Orphan Black | Nominated | |
| Gracie Awards | 2014 | Outstanding Female Actor in a Breakthrough Role | Orphan Black | Won | |
| Hamptons International Film Festival Awards | 2013 | Breakthrough Performer | Picture Day | Won | |
| People's Choice Awards | 2014 | Favorite Sci-Fi/Fantasy Actress | Orphan Black | Nominated | |
| Primetime Emmy Awards | 2015 | Outstanding Lead Actress in a Drama Series | Orphan Black | Nominated | |
| Primetime Emmy Awards | 2016 | Outstanding Lead Actress in a Drama Series | Orphan Black | Won | |
| Primetime Emmy Awards | 2018 | Outstanding Lead Actress in a Drama Series | Orphan Black | Nominated | |
| Satellite Awards | 2014 | Best Actress – Television Series Drama | Orphan Black | Nominated | |
| Satellite Awards | 2017 | Best Actress – Television Series Drama | Orphan Black | Nominated | |
| Saturn Awards | 2024 | Best Actress in a Television Series | She-Hulk: Attorney at Law | Nominated | |
| Sundance Film Festival Awards | 2010 | World Cinema Special Jury Prize For Acting | Grown Up Movie Star | Won | |
| TCA Awards | 2013 | Individual Achievement in Drama | Orphan Black | Won | |
| TCA Awards | 2014 | Individual Achievement in Drama | Orphan Black | Nominated | |
| Young Hollywood Awards | 2013 | Breakthrough Performance – Female | Orphan Black | Won | |
| Vancouver Film Critics Circle Awards | 2014 | Best Actress in a Canadian Film | Picture Day | Nominated | |
| Whistler Film Festival | 2012 | Best Actor in a Borsos Film Award | Picture Day | Won | |
| Whistler Film Festival | 2013 | Best Actor in a Borsos Film Award | Cas and Dylan | Won | |
