= Yelling to the Sky =

2011 film

- Theatrical release poster
- Directed by: Victoria Mahoney
- Written by: Victoria Mahoney
- Produced by: Victoria Mahoney; Billy Mulligan; Ged Dickersin
- Starring: Zoë Kravitz
- Cinematography: Reed Morano
- Edited by: Billy Henry
- Music by: David Wittman
- Production companies: YTTS LLC; Front Row Filmed Entertainment
- Distributed by: MPI Media Group
- Release dates: February 12, 2011 (Berlinale); March 11, 2011 (US)
- Running time: 96 minutes
- Country: United States
- Language: English

Yelling to the Sky is a 2011 American drama film written and directed by Victoria Mahoney and starring Zoë Kravitz. The film premiered In Competition at the 61st Berlin International Film Festival, where it competed for the Golden Bear.

== Plot ==
Studious high schooler Sweetness O'Hara rides her bike with a friend down a street, when neighborhood bully Latonya, her boyfriend, and friends begins picking on her. The boyfriend threatens to take Sweetness's bike, unless she can beat him in a race to a nearby tree. Sweetness agrees, taking off running. The bully comes up behind her and pushes her to the ground, proceeding to kick her. Sweetness' older, pregnant sister, Ola, comes to her rescue, beating up the bully.

The girls return home to their emotionally unstable mother, Lorene, and violent father, Gordon. After an altercation between the parents, Lorene leaves, promising Sweetness that she will return. Gordon leaves as well.

Days later, as Ola is helping Sweetness with her homework and ironing, Gordon returns. He hits Ola after her choice to wear a jacket inside the house. Ola then packs up and moves in with her probation-serving, abusive boyfriend and baby's father, leaving Sweetness with just Gordon. Months later, Ola returns with Esther, a baby girl. Lorene then returns as well, in an absent state of mind.

At school, her principal, Mr. Coleman, unknowingly protects Sweetness from getting beat up by Latonya and her friends, Fatima and Jojo, by mentioning Ola and asking how she was doing. The sisters deliver a letter written to Gordon, saying that his brother has passed in his sleep. At home, with Gordon absent, Ola chases after Lorene, who has absent-mindedly walked out of the house.

The next morning, Sweetness and Gordon get into a fight due to her wearing makeup to school. She talks back and throws a bottle of glue at him, saying that that was the last time he will hit her. She starts selling drugs, with the help of Roland, a drug dealer and friend who is reluctant.

She begins to hang out with Fatima and Jojo, after they buy drugs off her. She fights Latonya at school, which ends up in getting Sweetness suspended. She sees Latonya at school later on, carrying books and going to class.

During a drug deal, Sweetness tags along with Roland, who tells her to stay put. She walks into a hotel room, against Roland's advice, and is groped by a drug dealer. The two escape the failed drug deal, and almost get arrested in the process. When Roland drops Sweetness off, she kisses him. He refuses her advances, but continues kissing her despite her age.

Days later, while the girls and Roland are cutting school and playing handball, the two guys from the failed drug deal drive by and shoot Roland dead. Sweetness blames herself for the shooting, realizing that if she had not walked into the hotel room, he would still be alive. She angrily destroys her own and Ola's shared bedroom, and leaves with Ola's car to a party. On her way home, while drunk and high on coke and weed (and after losing her virginity), Sweetness totals the car, promising to pay Ola back.

After helping Gordon put stitches on a cut on his head one night, he starts to become less violent towards his family. He sees Sweetness drinking with her friends on the street one day, but does not get angry at her when she returns home that night. He follows her to school and waits for her afterwards, following her back home. Frustrated, she demands to know what he wants. Gordon says that he is worried about Sweetness and that he is here for her now, all with her replying "too late now".

Realizing her future if she stays in her neighborhood, Sweetness starts to turn things around. First, by applying for college, apologizing to Latonya (who does not accept it), and opting to stay in and do dishes instead of going out with her friends.

While driving her home, Gordon says that he is going to walk with her the next day. She offers meeting him halfway (because of his hip), but he refuses. She starts to cry and the two embrace.

== Cast ==
- Zoë Kravitz as Sweetness O'Hara
- Jason Clarke as Gordon O'Hara
- Antonique Smith as Ola O'Hara
- Tariq "Black Thought" Trotter as Roland
- Shareeka Epps as Fatima Harris
- Tim Blake Nelson as Coleman
- Gabourey Sidibe as Latonya Williams
- Yolonda Ross as Lorene O'Hara
- Adam Tomei as Cal
- Billy Kay as Dobbs
- Gio Perez as Shorty
- Peter Anthony Tambakis as Drew
- E. J. Bonilla as Rob
- Sonequa Martin as Jojo Parker
- Hassan Manning as Bohanen
- Marc John Jefferies as Lil' Man

== Reception ==
The US industry trade paper, Variety, said of the film, "Yelling to the Sky" boasts a strong directorial voice. [Victoria] Mahoney was clearly driven by a genuine creative gift, and escaped such restraints to unleash this affecting cri du coeur." Despite seeing promise in her talent, the critic found the film overall unsatisfactory, stating it was “strong on texture but taxingly light on narrative.”

Filmmaker named Mahoney one of the 2010 "25 New Faces of Independent Film", saying of the film, "A powerful, emotionally nuanced debut. Mahoney, who has drawn fine performances from her actors, has a sophisticated and empathetic understanding of the characters they play."
