= 2013 Young Hollywood Awards =

American entertainment awards

- Date: August 1, 2013
- Location: Los Angeles, California
- Hosted by: Aisha Tyler

Television/radio coverage
- Network: The CW
- Produced by: Michael Levitt (Executive producer)

The 15th Annual Young Hollywood Awards were held on Thursday, August 1, 2013, in Los Angeles, California, previously recorded the day before. Aisha Tyler was the host. While there were no nominees that year, the recipients were "honored" with the awards. This was the first year that the awards were televised.

== Winners and nominees ==
| Fan Favorite | One to Watch |
|---|---|
| Dave Franco | Bella Thorne |
| Male Breakthrough Performance | Female Breakthrough Performance |
| Liam James | Tatiana Maslany |
| Actor of the Year | Female Superstar of Tomorrow |
| Kit Harington | AnnaSophia Robb |
| SodaStream Unbottle the World | Crossover of the Year |
| Lauren Conrad | Lucy Hale |
| Style Icon | Role Model |
| Kelly Osbourne | Cody Simpson |
| Best Male Artist | Breakout Artist |
| Miguel | Austin Mahone |
| Fan Favorite–Album | Most Anticipated Tour |
| Selena Gomez | Selena Gomez |
| Best Ensemble | Internet Sensation |
| Teen Wolf | Sharknado |

== See also ==
- List of American television awards
