= Any Other Night =

Upcoming German romantic comedy film

- Directed by: Michiel ten Horn
- Written by: Patrick Whistler
- Produced by: Mike MacMillan; Sol Bondy; Karen Harnisch; Erik Glijnis; Leontine Petit
- Starring: Tatiana Maslany; Marwan Kenzari; Hannah Hoekstra; Mala Emde; Nikolai Kinski
- Production companies: Lithium Studios; One Two Films; Lemming Film; Film Forge
- Countries: Canada; Germany; Netherlands
- Language: English

Any Other Night is an upcoming romantic comedy film from Dutch director Michiel ten Horn, in his English-language feature length debut. The cast is led by Tatiana Maslany and Marwan Kenzari.

== Premise ==
A cab driver collects a recently single woman carrying all her worldly possessions in Berlin, during a transit strike.

== Cast ==
- Tatiana Maslany
- Marwan Kenzari
- Hannah Hoekstra
- Mala Emde
- Nikolai Kinski

== Production ==
The film is directed by Michiel ten Horn, in his feature length English-language debut, from a script by Patrick Whistler. The film is a co-production between Lithium Studios, One Two Films, Lemming Film, and Film Forge. The producers include Mike MacMillan, Sol Bondy, Karen Harnisch, Erik Glijnis and Leontine Petit.

The cast is led by Tatiana Maslany and Marwan Kenzari and also includes Hannah Hoekstra, Mala Emde and Nikolai Kinski. Kenzari was initially cast alongside Gillian Jacobs in the film in 2021.

Principal photography took place in April and May 2025. Filming locations included Berlin, Germany.
