= Wolf (2013 film) =

2013 film directed by Jim Taihuttu

- Directed by: Jim Taihuttu
- Written by: Jim Taihuttu
- Produced by: Julius Ponten; Marina Blok
- Starring: Chemseddine Amar; Marwan Kenzari; Bo Maerten; Cahit Ölmez; Raymond Thiry
- Cinematography: Lennart Verstegen
- Edited by: Wouter van Luijn
- Music by: Michaël Sauvage
- Distributed by: Habbekrats / Just Film Distribution
- Release date: 19 December 2013
- Running time: 122 minutes
- Country: Netherlands
- Languages: Arabic; Dutch; English; French; Turkish

Wolf is a Dutch action, drama, and martial arts film, and the second film made by Jim Taihattu and Julius Ponten, from Habbekrats, an independent production company in the Netherlands.

Filmed in Utrecht, Netherlands, while partially filmed in Turkey, the film is spoken primarily in Dutch, with parts spoken in Arabic, English, French and Turkish. Subtitles are shown and are available in both French and English.

The main character is played by Marwan Kenzari.

In 2013, the film translated into Russian by Andrey Efremov was shown in the Russian city of Vologda as part of the VOICES Young Cinema Festival.

== Plot ==
Majid (Marwan Kenzari), a talented kickboxer from an anonymous suburb in the Netherlands, finds himself falling deeper into the underworld of kickboxing, gambling and organized crime. He begins to lose sight of what it is he really wants as the lines between the sport and the criminal underworld start to blur, interweaving his family, friends, professional career and criminal life.

== Cast ==
- Marwan Kenzari as Majid
- Chemseddine Amar as Adil
- Bo Maerten as Tessa
- Raymond Thiry as Ben
- Cahit Ölmez as Hakan

== Awards and honours ==
- Golden Calf: 3
  - Best Production Design: 2013
  - Best Actor: 2013
  - Best Director of a Feature Film: 2013
- San Sebastián International Film Festival Awards: 1
  - Youth Jury Award: 2013
- SUBTITLE European Film Festival Awards: 1
  - Angela Award: 2013
- Taipei Film Festival Awards: 1
  - International New Talent Competition - Special Jury Prize: 2013

== See also ==
- Rabat
