= The Old Guard (2020 film) =

2020 American action-fantasy film

- Official release poster
- Directed by: Gina Prince-Bythewood
- Screenplay by: Greg Rucka
- Based on: The Old Guard by: Greg Rucka; Leandro Fernández
- Produced by: David Ellison; Dana Goldberg; Don Granger; Charlize Theron; A.J. Dix; Beth Kono; Marc Evans
- Starring: Charlize Theron; KiKi Layne; Marwan Kenzari; Luca Marinelli; Harry Melling; Veronica Ngo; Matthias Schoenaerts; Chiwetel Ejiofor
- Cinematography: Tami Reiker; Barry Ackroyd
- Edited by: Terilyn A. Shropshire
- Music by: Volker Bertelmann; Dustin O'Halloran
- Production companies: Skydance; Denver and Delilah Productions; Marc Evans Productions
- Distributed by: Netflix
- Release date: July 10, 2020 (United States)
- Running time: 125 minutes
- Country: United States
- Language: English
- Budget: $70 million

The Old Guard is a 2020 American superhero film directed by Gina Prince-Bythewood and written by Greg Rucka, based on his comic book series. It stars Charlize Theron, KiKi Layne, Matthias Schoenaerts, Marwan Kenzari, Luca Marinelli, Harry Melling, Veronica Ngo and Chiwetel Ejiofor, and follows a team of immortal mercenaries on a revenge mission. It was released on July 10, 2020, on Netflix. It received generally positive reviews, with praise for its action sequences and Theron's performance. A sequel directed by Victoria Mahoney, The Old Guard 2, was released on July 2, 2025.

== Plot ==
Andy, Booker, Joe, and Nicky are mercenaries with unexplained regenerative healing abilities. They accept a job to rescue a group of kidnapped girls in South Sudan, breaking their rule of never working for the same employer twice. The mission proves to be a ruse by their client James Copley, who films them being ambushed and killed, before quickly recovering and defeating their attackers.

Meanwhile, in Afghanistan, U.S. Marine Nile Freeman is killed by having her throat slit, but recovers and heals without a scratch. Later, she shares a disturbing dream with the other immortals, who are then alerted to her existence, as they experience dreams of any new immortals until found. Andy tracks down a confused Nile, extracting her from Afghanistan before military personnel can transfer her for testing.

Copley shows the video of the ambush to pharmaceutical executive Steven Merrick, who sends operatives to capture the team. Andy brings Nile to a safe house in France, where she meets Booker, Joe, and Nicky.

The group shares some of their past and reveals that they are not fully immortal: their ability to heal eventually stops without warning. They share this happened to a previous immortal, Lykon. That night, Nile dreams about repeatedly drowning in an iron maiden.

When Nile shares her dream with the others they tell her about Quỳnh, the first immortal aside from herself that Andy had found. She was sentenced for witchcraft and cast into the sea in an iron maiden approximately 500 years ago. The other immortals have been unable to locate Quỳnh, so she has been continuously drowning ever since, with Andy bearing the guilt for her punishment.

The group is soon ambushed by Merrick's forces. Joe and Nicky are captured while a seemingly deceased Booker is left behind. Upon discovering the attack, Andy kills all of the remaining assailants while Booker recuperates. Mildly wounded, she realizes she is not healing. Andy hides this from them. Booker locates Copley, and Nile heads off to reunite with her family.

Joe and Nicky are transported to Merrick Pharmaceutical's headquarters in London. There, they are strapped down and tortured in the lab to observe their regeneration and take tissue samples.

Andy and Booker confront Copley, but Booker betrays Andy and shoots her, arguing that Merrick might find a way to end the immortality they have both grown weary of. Booker realizes that Andy is not healing as they are captured. Simultaneously, Nile discovers evidence that Booker sold out the group, but arrives too late to intervene. Booker and Andy are brought to Merrick Pharmaceuticals and strapped down beside Joe and Nicky.

Copley has a change of heart upon seeing that Merrick is primarily motivated by greed and sadism, not medical advancement, and is planning to kill Andy and torture all of them indefinitely, primarily to prevent rival pharmaceutical companies from discovering proprietary trade secrets. Nile confronts Copley, who agrees to assist her in a rescue mission.

With Copley locating them, Nile storms Merrick's London headquarters, freeing the four other group members. Merrick corners Andy and Nile, but they distract and disarm him with Andy wounding him and Nile killing him by grabbing him and jumping out of a high-rise window. All five of them, including the no-longer-immortal Andy, make it out and get away.

The group sentences Booker to loneliness as punishment for his betrayal, thus forbidding him from contacting them for 100 years. Booker and Andy say goodbye to each other. Andy, Nicky, Joe, and Nile meet with Copley, who explains how his research revealed their past missions had a greater effect than they ever knew, including how the descendants of people they had rescued went on to help the world in many different ways. They task Copley with the job of using his skills and experience with the CIA to cover their tracks going forward, and assisting to position them into jobs where they will have the largest positive impact.

In an epilogue set six months later in Paris, a depressed and drunken Booker stumbles into his apartment to find Quỳnh waiting for him.

== Cast ==
- Charlize Theron as Andromache "Andy" of Scythia
- KiKi Layne as Nile Freeman
- Marwan Kenzari as Joe/Yusuf Al-Kaysani
- Luca Marinelli as Nicolò 'Nicky' di Genova
- Harry Melling as Steven Merrick
- Ngô Thanh Vân (credited as Van Veronica Ngo) as Quỳnh
- Matthias Schoenaerts as Booker/Sébastien Le Livre
- Chiwetel Ejiofor as James Copley
- Anamaria Marinca as Dr. Meta Kozak
- Joey Ansah as Keane

== Production ==
=== Development ===
In March 2017, Skydance Media obtained the rights to adapt the comic The Old Guard, written by Greg Rucka and illustrated by Leandro Fernandez, into a film. Rucka's contract stipulated that a major scene highlighting the romance between the characters Joe and Nicky from the book had to be kept in the film adaptation.

In July 2018, they hired Gina Prince-Bythewood to direct with Rucka adapting his book to screenplay and Skydance's David Ellison, Dana Goldberg and Don Granger producing. With a budget of about $70 million, Prince-Bythewood became the first black woman to direct a big-budget comic book film. In March 2019, Netflix obtained worldwide rights to the film and agreed to finance it with Skydance. Charlize Theron joined the film and also produced with Beth Kono, A.J. Dix, Marc Evans and Skydance's David Ellison, Dana Goldberg, and Don Granger.

KiKi Layne was confirmed to star in the film after Netflix picked up the rights. In May 2019, Marwan Kenzari, Matthias Schoenaerts, and Luca Marinelli joined the cast. In June 2019, Chiwetel Ejiofor, Harry Melling and Veronica Ngo joined the cast. At Ngo's request, details of her character were changed from the comic book. In an interview, Rucka said, "When Veronica was cast, she said I'm not Japanese, I'm Vietnamese. [Director Gina Prince-Bythewood] reached out to me and said 'Can we accommodate that?' and I was like, 'Absolutely.' [...] Noriko becomes Quynh, Quynh is now Vietnamese. It really was as simple as wanting to honor that, and be respectful of that". The other change to the character was the character's death. "In the comic, Quynh/Noriko is washed overboard during a storm rather than deliberately drowned. According to Rucka, that was partially a logistical change to save money. [...] But Quynh's new 'death,' solidified by Prince-Bythewood's suggestion of the iron maiden imagery, served an important narrative and tonal role as well".

=== Filming ===
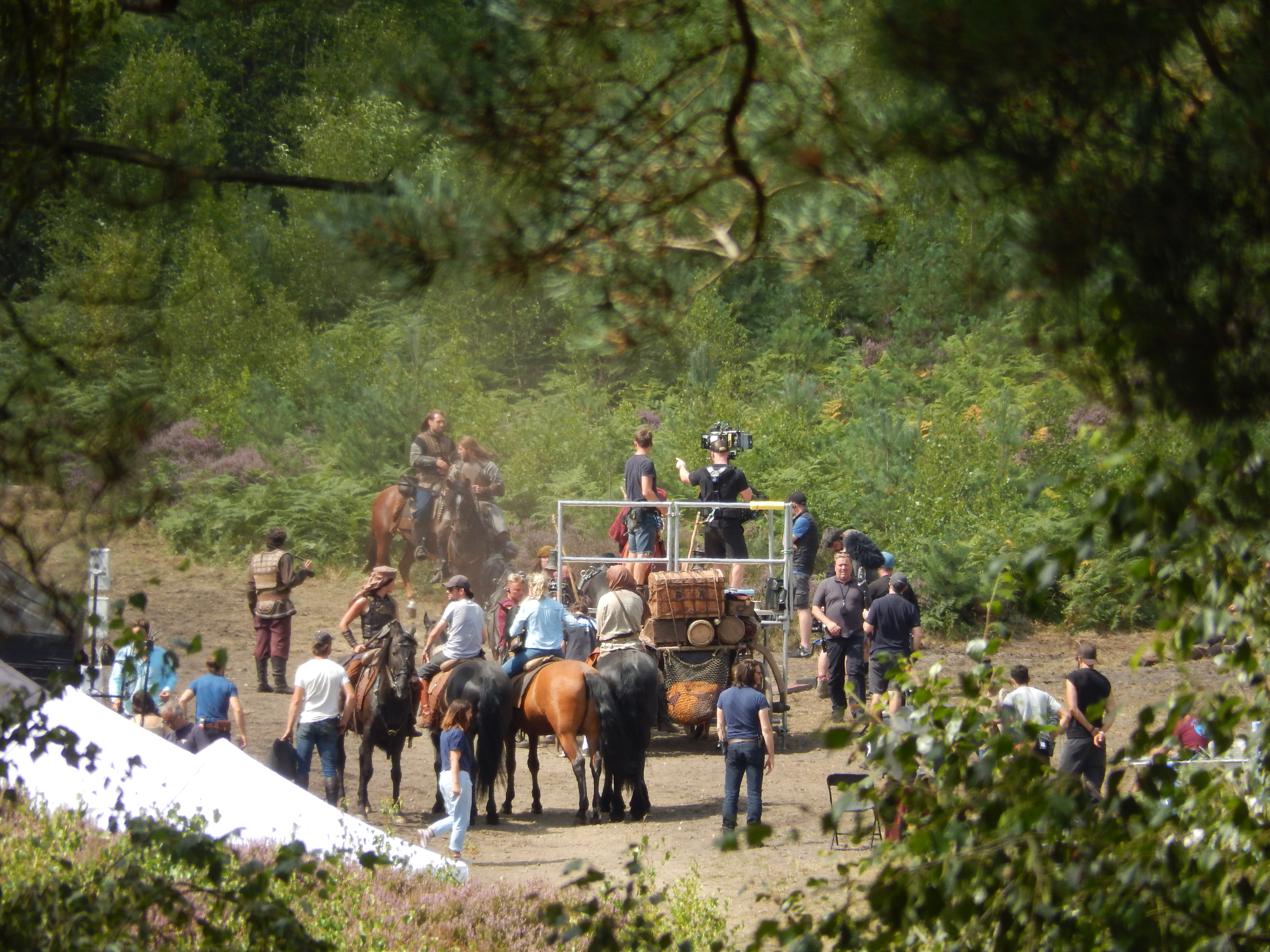
Filming at Bourne Wood in Surrey during August 2019

Principal photography began in Europe in mid-May 2019. Filming took place in Morocco and the United Kingdom, including at Shepperton Studios in England. Sandwich in Kent was used for the French town Goussainville. Sandwich's Discovery Park doubled as Merrick Pharmaceutical headquarters. Filming in the famous pub Prospect of Whitby took place on July 10, 2019.

Volker Bertelmann and Dustin O'Halloran composed the film's score. Lakeshore Records released the soundtrack on July 10, 2020, coinciding with the film's streaming release.

== Release ==
The Old Guard was released on July 10, 2020, on Netflix. It was the top-streamed item on the site over its first weekend. It ranked second and fourth the following two weekends.

On July 17, Netflix reported the film was on pace to be viewed by 72 million households over its first four weeks, among the top 10 most-successful original launches in the platform's history. That October, Netflix reported the actual figure to have been 78 million. In November, Variety reported the film was the seventh-most watched straight-to-streaming title of 2020 up to that point. In December, Tom Breihan of The A.V. Club reported that due to "the way Netflix operates, we don't even know whether The Old Guard is a hit in any measurable sense. Netflix itself claims that 78 million households have watched it, and I have no idea whether that's a good number".

== Reception ==
=== Critical response ===
On review aggregator website Rotten Tomatoes, the film holds an approval rating of 80% based on 288 reviews, with an average rating of 6.5/10. The site's critics consensus reads: "The Old Guard is occasionally restricted by genre conventions, but director Gina Prince-Bythewood brings a sophisticated vision to the superhero genre - and some knockout action sequences led by Charlize Theron." At Metacritic, the film has a weighted average score of 70 out of 100, based on 45 critics, indicating "generally favorable reviews".

Kate Erbland of IndieWire gave the film a "B+" and said: "Steeped in hand-to-hand action... but with enough ballistic firepower to kit out a small civil war, every action sequence is more than awe-inspiring; they're necessary to the film itself. Superhero battles that are eye popping and narratively motivated? Oh, yeah." Owen Gleiberman of Variety called the film a "watchable franchise wannabe" and wrote: "Chunks of the picture are logy and formulaic (it dawdles on for two hours), but the director, Gina Prince-Bythewood (making a major lane change after Love & Basketball and The Secret Life of Bees), stages the fight scenes with ripe executionary finesse, and she teases out a certain soulful quality in her cast." Bob Chipman of The Escapist gave the film 7 out of 10 and said: "This is a clever, slick, progressive minded, yet also brutally violent, frequently kick ass action film" and that "they clearly want it to be a franchise, I'd certainly watch another one." Tom Breihan, for The A.V. Club, wrote, "The Old Guard is a superhero story; it's just one of the many superhero stories that attempts to subvert superhero stories. [...] Though The Old Guard tackles superhero-movie clichés in interesting ways, it has more difficulty with the emerging conventions of the Netflix movie".

The film's portrayal of LGBTQ+ characters within the superhero genre was praised. Kevin Fallon of The Daily Beast said that The Old Guard "is the first movie with out gay superheroes, or the extremely (extremely) rare action film to feature queer characters and acknowledge their romance. [...] The sexuality of the characters is matter-of-fact and inconsequential to their ability to kick total-and-complete ass, yet also given the dignity of expressing and showing their love". Benjamin Lee, for The Guardian, wrote that "in 2020, it really shouldn't be such a big deal, but watching a form of unfettered queer love exist within the confines of a fantastical comic book adaptation, aimed at a wide audience, felt major to me." Anna Menta of Decider wrote:

"I hadn't read The Old Guard comic, and I didn't know that writer Greg Rucka had stipulated in his contract that, whenever or however the film got made, it had to include that scene. So when it happened, well, it felt—and still does feel—like a huge freakin' deal. [...] It's just as passionate, just as charged, and just as sensual as Han and Leia, Peter and MJ, Peeta and Katniss, or any other heterosexual couple who's had a big kiss moment in an action movie over the years".

=== Accolades ===
Award	Category	Recipient	Result	Ref.
Black Reel Awards	Outstanding Supporting Actress	KiKi Layne	Nominated	
Critics' Choice Super Awards	Best Superhero Movie		Won	
Critics' Choice Super Awards	Best Actor in a Superhero Movie	Chiwetel Ejiofor	Nominated	
Critics' Choice Super Awards	Best Actress in a Superhero Movie	Charlize Theron	Nominated	
Critics' Choice Super Awards	Best Actress in a Superhero Movie	KiKi Layne	Nominated	
GLAAD Media Awards	Outstanding Film – Wide Release		Nominated	
Hollywood Music in Media Awards	Best Original Score in a Sci-Fi/Fantasy Film	Volker Bertelmann and Dustin O'Halloran	Nominated	
Houston Film Critics Society Awards	Best Stunt Coordination Team		Nominated	
Hugo Awards	Best Dramatic Presentation, Long Form	Gina Prince-Bythewood and Greg Rucka	Won	
NAACP Image Awards	Outstanding Directing in a Motion Picture	Gina Prince-Bythewood	Won	
People's Choice Awards	Favorite Movie of 2020		Nominated	
People's Choice Awards	Favorite Action Movie of 2020		Nominated	
People's Choice Awards	Favorite Female Movie Star of 2020	Charlize Theron	Nominated	
People's Choice Awards	Favorite Action Movie Star of 2020	Charlize Theron	Nominated	
ReFrame	Top 100 Most Popular Narrative & Animated Feature		Won	
Saturn Awards	Best Comic-to-Film Motion Picture		Nominated	
Saturn Awards	Best Actress	Charlize Theron	Nominated	
Saturn Awards	Best Director	Gina Prince-Bythewood	Nominated	

== Sequel ==
On the coda preceding The Old Guard's credits, Rucka said, "In case of sequel, break glass. It's very straightforward. You want another one? Here's a way to get into it". A sequel to the original graphic novel, The Old Guard: Force Multiplied, was published in 2019. Theron has expressed her interest in a second film, saying: "Let's have a little resting period, but just given the fact that all of us really want to do it, I'm sure when it's the right time, we'll start the conversation."

It was reported on January 27, 2021, that Netflix had greenlit a sequel. On August 26, it was announced that Victoria Mahoney would replace Prince-Bythewood as director for the sequel. Theron, Layne, Schoenaerts, Kenzari, Marinelli, Ngo, and Ejiofor will reprise their roles from the first movie. In June 2022, Uma Thurman and Henry Golding were cast in undisclosed roles. At least part of the film was shot at the Italian Cinecittà Studios, with a fire in August 2022 causing temporary disruption to filming.
