= Marwan Kenzari =

Dutch actor

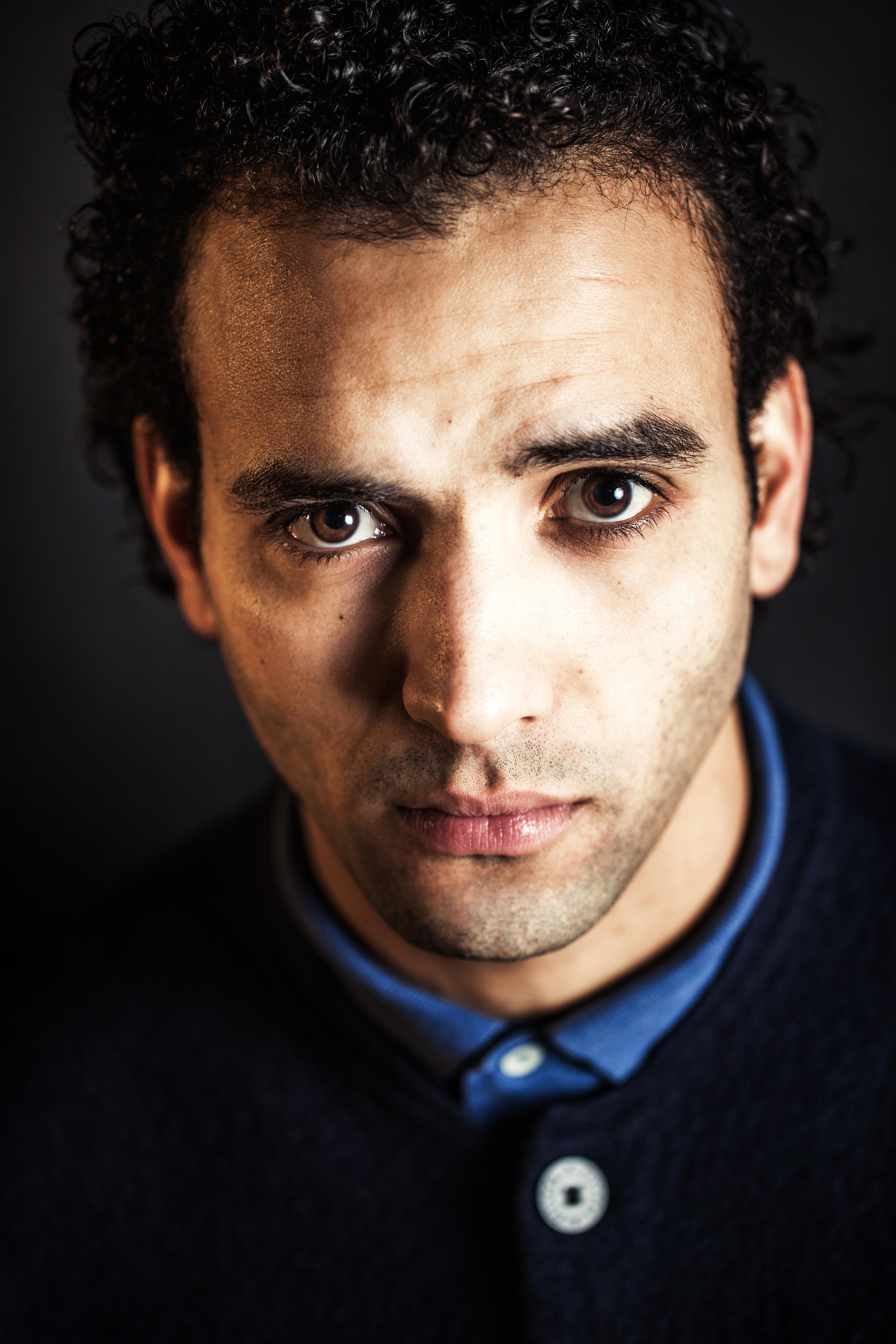
- Kenzari in 2013
- Born: The Hague, Netherlands
- Education: Maastricht Academy of Dramatic Arts
- Occupation: Actor
- Years active: 2008–present

Marwan Kenzari (Arabic: مروان كنزاري) is a Dutch actor of Tunisian descent. Starting his career in 2008, he first came to prominence for his role in the 2013 film Wolf, which earned him a Golden Calf award for Best Actor. Since 2016, he has been portraying roles in English-language films, including Aladdin (2019), The Old Guard (2020) and Black Adam (2022), which earned him international recognition.

== Early life and education ==
Kenzari was born in The Hague, Netherlands, to a Tunisian family. His father was a construction worker, while his mother was a housewife. As a teenager he was mainly interested in football before a girl he was seeing signed them up to audition for the Dutch version of the musical Chicago. In 2009, Kenzari graduated at the Maastricht Academy of Dramatic Arts. After graduation he was recruited by the Toneelgroep Amsterdam, which allowed him to tour in Moscow, London, Vienna and New York City with the group.

== Career ==
Kenzari has acted in films and TV series in his native Dutch since 2008. In 2013, he won a Golden Calf for Best Actor at the Netherlands Film Festival for his role in the feature film Wolf (2013). He trained for over a year to play the role of kickboxer Majid. With his toned body, he was also featured on the cover of Dutch Men's Health in 2013. His performance in the film was well received by critics, with Variety naming him an "International Star You Should Know". In 2014, Kenzari won a Shooting Stars Award at the Berlin International Film Festival.

In 2016 he appeared in the English-language films Collide, Ben-Hur and The Promise, which resulted in The Hollywood Reporter naming him amongst their list of "15 International Breakout Talents of 2016". In 2019, Kenzari played villain Jafar in Disney's live-action adaptation of Aladdin. He gained international recognition after portraying the role with mainstream media giving him the nickname "hot Jafar". In July 2020, Kenzari appeared in The Old Guard as one of the film's protagonists. Also in the same year, he starred as the controversial Royal Netherlands East Indies Army (KNIL) officer Raymond Westerling in the film The East, which was released on Amazon Prime Video.

In February 2021, Kenzari was cast to portray Ishmael Gregor / Sabbac in the 2022 film Black Adam. He has a minor role in the second season of the Netflix series The Night Agent, released January 2025.

== Personal life ==
Kenzari speaks Arabic, Dutch, English and French.

== Filmography ==
=== Film ===
Key
†	Denotes works that have not yet been released

Year	Title	Role	Note
2008	Katia's Sister	Giac	
2009	The Last Days of Emma Blank	Martin	
2010	Loft	Tom Fenneker	
2011	Rabat	Zakaria	
2012	Black Out	Youssef	
2013	Wolf	Majid Zamari	
2014	Hartenstraat	Daan	
2014	Accused	Det. Ron Leeflang	
2014	Reckless	Rico	
2014	Gift from the Heart	Richard	
2016	Collide	Matthias	
2016	Ben-Hur	Druses	
2016	The Promise	Emre Ogan	
2017	The Mummy	Malik	
2017	What Happened to Monday	Adrian Knowles	
2017	Murder on the Orient Express	Pierre Michel	
2018	The Angel	Ashraf Marwan	
2019	Aladdin	Jafar	
2019	Instinct	Idris	
2020	The Old Guard	Yusuf Al-Kaysani / Joe	
2020	De Oost	Raymond Westerling	
2022	Black Adam	Ishmael Gregor / Sabbac	
2023	Ghosted	Marco	
2024	The Return	Antinous	
2025	The Old Guard 2	Yusuf Al-Kaysani / Joe	
TBA	Any Other Night †	Max	Post-production

=== Television ===
Year	Title	Role	Notes
2008–2010	Flikken Maastricht	Luca de Keyzer	7 episodes
2009	Maite was hier	Vuc	Television film
2012	Godforsaken	Frank Hendrikx	1 episode
2012–2013	Penoza	Mustafa	8 episodes
2025	The Night Agent	Sami Saidi	4 episodes

== Awards and nominations ==
Year	Ceremony	Award	Work	Result
2013	Golden Calf Awards	Best Actor	Wolf	Won
2013	SUBTITLE European Film Festival	Angela Award	Wolf	Won
2014	Rembrandt Awards	Best Dutch Actor	Wolf	Nominated
2014	Shooting Stars Awards	Shooting Star	Himself	Won
2019	Teen Choice Awards	Choice Movie: Villain	Aladdin	Nominated
2020	Golden Calf Awards	Best Actor	Instinct	Nominated
