= Cas and Dylan =

- Theatrical release poster
- Directed by: Jason Priestley
- Written by: Jessie Gabe
- Produced by: Mark Montefiore
- Starring: Richard Dreyfuss; Tatiana Maslany; Jayne Eastwood; Aaron Poole; Corinne Conley; Eric Peterson
- Cinematography: Gerald Packer
- Edited by: Bridget Durnford
- Music by: Michael Brook
- Production company: Montefiore Films
- Distributed by: Pacific Northwest Pictures
- Release dates: September 16, 2013 (Atlantic Film Festival); April 4, 2014 (Canada)
- Running time: 90 minutes
- Country: Canada
- Language: English

Cas and Dylan is a 2013 Canadian comedy-drama film directed by Jason Priestley from a screenplay by Jessie Gabe. It stars Richard Dreyfuss, Tatiana Maslany, Jayne Eastwood, Aaron Poole, Corinne Conley, and Eric Peterson. The film had its world premiere at the Atlantic Film Festival on September 16, 2013. It was released on April 4, 2014, by Pacific Northwest Pictures.

== Plot ==
Dr. Cas Pepper is a 61-year-old doctor, a self-proclaimed loner, and terminally ill. Dylan Morgan is a 22-year-old woman, somewhat of a social misfit, and an aspiring writer. She is currently living with her boyfriend Bobby, who is an unstable individual. Cas reluctantly agrees to give Dylan a short lift to her home. Cas accidentally strikes Bobby with his car when he jumps in front of them and points a rifle at them, and, fearing that he may now be a fugitive from the law, drives away with Dylan's encouragement.

Cas and Dylan take off on a drive across Canada, he heading to his vacation home on Canada's west coast (where he plans to bury his recently deceased dog and to commit suicide), and she towards an ostensible interview with a major publishing company she has been communicating with. Initially Cas is not thrilled with the prospect of spending the ride with this young talkative kid, but as the adventure progresses, they grow sweetly fond of each other, helping one another resolve the issues they encounter along the way.

The epilogue shows a successful, fulfilled Dylan some time after the cross-country trip, with her voice-over telling us about her tremendous respect for him, and that her current happiness is largely a result of following his advice—a happiness not hindered by the fact that he left her his entire estate after his death (as well as his "secret" pasta sauce recipe).

== Cast ==
- Tatiana Maslany as Dylan Morgan
- Richard Dreyfuss as Dr. Cas Pepper
- Aaron Poole as Steve
- Eric Peterson as Jack
- Natalie Radford as Susan Crosby
- Christopher Cordell as Bobby
- Corinne Conley as Rose
- Jayne Eastwood as Hotel Receptionist

== Production ==
In March 2012, it was announced that Jason Priestley would direct the film in his directorial debut, from a screenplay by Jessie Gabe, with Tatiana Maslany attached to star in the film, and with Mark Montefiore producing the film. In August 2012, it was announced that Richard Dreyfuss had been cast in the film as Dr. Cas Pepper.

Principal photography began in late summer and early fall of 2012 in Greater Sudbury, Ontario. Additional scenes were filmed in Calgary, Alberta.

== Release ==
The film had its world premiere at the Atlantic Film Festival on September 16, 2013. It was released in Canada on April 4, 2014. In November 2014, Entertainment One acquired U.S distribution rights to the film. The film was released through video on demand on April 17, 2015 prior to a limited release on May 1, 2015.

== Critical reception ==
Cas and Dylan received negative reviews from film critics. It holds a "Rotten" 31% rating on review aggregator website Rotten Tomatoes, based on 13 reviews, with an average rating of 4.7/10. On Metacritic, the film holds a rating of 32 out of 100, based on 6 critics, indicating "Generally unfavorable reviews".

The film won the Audience Award at the 2013 Whistler Film Festival.
