= Don Granger =

American film producer

- Occupation: Film producer
- Years active: 1987–present
- Known for: Producing the films Jack Reacher and Mission: Impossible – Rogue Nation.
- Spouse: Lisa McRee (m. 1996–present)

Don Granger is an American film producer, best known for producing numerous Skydance Media films, including Jack Reacher and Mission: Impossible – Rogue Nation.

== Career ==
Granger started his career in 1987 by joining Weintraub Entertainment Group, later joined Touchstone Pictures in the next year. In 1990, he joined Paramount Pictures and worked as executive VP of production and overseeing till 2001.

In 2001, Granger joined Gary Levinsohn to work in the production company Mutual Film Company together, after its co-founder Mark Gordon left the company. He executive produced the film Timeline and produced Snakes on a Plane for the company.

In 2004, Granger joined Tom Cruise and Paula Wagner's Cruise/Wagner Productions as a senior executive of development and production, and he produced the film The Eye there.

In 2007, Granger joined the United Artists as a prexy of production.

In March 2014, Granger joined the Skydance Productions as the newly created post EVP Feature Productions, and he would report to Dana Goldberg, company's chief creative officer.

In November 2026, Granger joined Paramount Pictures as the president alongside Kira Goldberg, and he would report to Dana Goldberg and Josh Greenstein, co-chairs of Skydance Motion Picture Group.

== Personal life ==
Granger married journalist and news anchor Lisa McRee in 1996.

== Filmography ==
Executive producer

- Timeline (2003)
- Death Race (2008)
- Life (2017)
- Baywatch (2017)
- Geostorm (2017)
- Annihilation (2018)
- Mission: Impossible – Fallout (2018)
- Terminator: Dark Fate (2019)
- The Old Guard (2020)
- Without Remorse (2021)
- Snake Eyes (2021)
- Top Gun: Maverick (2022)
- Mission: Impossible – Dead Reckoning Part One (2023)
- Mission: Impossible – The Final Reckoning (2025)

Producer

- Ask the Dust (2006)
- Snakes on a Plane (2006)
- The Eye (2008)
- Jack Reacher (2012)
- Mission: Impossible – Rogue Nation (2015)
- Jack Reacher: Never Go Back (2016)
- Gemini Man (2019)
- 6 Underground (2019)
- The Tomorrow War (2021)
- The Adam Project (2022)
- Heart of Stone (2023)
- Spy Kids: Armageddon (2023)
- The Gorge (2025)
- The Old Guard 2 (2025)
- Fountain of Youth (2025)
- The Family Plan 2 (2025)
- Mayday (2026)
- Matchbox: The Movie (2026)
- Way of the Warrior Kid (2026)
