= The Old Guard 2 =

2025 superhero film directed by Victoria Mahoney

- Release poster
- Directed by: Victoria Mahoney
- Screenplay by: Greg Rucka; Sarah L. Walker
- Story by: Greg Rucka
- Based on: The Old Guard by: Greg Rucka; Leandro Fernández
- Produced by: David Ellison; Dana Goldberg; Don Granger; Charlize Theron; Beth Kono; AJ Dix; Marc Evans
- Starring: Charlize Theron; KiKi Layne; Matthias Schoenaerts; Marwan Kenzari; Luca Marinelli; Veronica Ngô; Henry Golding; Uma Thurman; Chiwetel Ejiofor
- Cinematography: Barry Ackroyd
- Edited by: Matthew Schmidt
- Music by: Steffen Thum; Ruth Barrett
- Production companies: Skydance Media; Denver and Delilah Productions; Marc Evans Productions
- Distributed by: Netflix
- Release date: July 2, 2025
- Running time: 107 minutes
- Country: United States
- Language: English

The Old Guard 2 is a 2025 American superhero film directed by Victoria Mahoney, from a screenplay by Greg Rucka and Sarah L. Walker, based on the comic book The Old Guard by Rucka and Leandro Fernández. Serving as a sequel to the first film, the film stars Charlize Theron, KiKi Layne, Matthias Schoenaerts, Marwan Kenzari, Luca Marinelli, Veronica Ngô, and Chiwetel Ejiofor reprising their roles from the first film while Henry Golding and Uma Thurman join the cast. The Old Guard 2 was released on July 2, 2025, on Netflix and received generally mixed-to-negative reviews from critics considering it inferior to its predecessor.

== Plot ==
Off the coast of Rome, Italy, an iron maiden is recovered from the ocean floor. When it is opened aboard the ship, Quỳnh, an immortal who has been imprisoned inside for 500 years, emerges. Six months after Booker was sentenced to loneliness, (Note: As depicted in the first film.) Andy leads Joe, Nicky, Nile, and Copley to retrieve a weapons cache from a secure compound in Split. While in hiding, Nile dreams of a woman incapacitating someone in a library before stealing books.

In Paris, Quỳnh finds and abducts Booker. Meanwhile, Andy and Copley track down Tuah, a sage immortal and an old friend of Andy's, in Seoul. Tuah reveals that he rescued Andy after Quỳnh was sealed away. He also explains that books documenting every immortal's existence have been stolen by Discord, an elusive immortal who became an arms dealer after parting ways with Tuah centuries earlier.

Andy and Copley escort Tuah to a hideout in Rimini, where Andy receives a message from Quỳnh through Booker, whom she has released. Quỳnh demands a meeting in Rome. During their tense reunion, Quỳnh accuses Andy of abandoning her. After a brief fight, Quỳnh retrieves a necklace.

Nile confronts Discord, who reveals that she was the first immortal and identifies Nile as the last, pointing to their identical birthmarks. Tuah theorizes that the last immortal can strip another immortal of their immortality by injuring them. He also proposes that someone who has lost immortality can regain it if another wounded immortal transfers theirs. The first part of the theory is confirmed when Booker challenges Nile to a spar and she grazes his forearm, leaving his wounds unable to heal. Booker insists that Tuah keep this discovery from Andy.

Andy and Copley learn that Discord and Quỳnh's mercenaries have seized a Chinese-built and owned nuclear facility in South Tangerang. The attackers have planted shaped charges inside the reactor core, threatening a meltdown that could affect millions. Despite recognizing the operation as a trap set by Discord, Andy's team proceeds to neutralize the occupiers and disarm the explosives.

During the mission, the team is quickly separated. Discord captures Joe, Nicky, and Tuah. In the ensuing fight, the wounded Booker transfers his immortality to Andy and sacrifices his life to protect her. Meanwhile, Nile is captured inside the reactor core, but not before confronting and injuring Quỳnh, stripping her of her regenerative healing ability.

Nile persuades the now-mortal Quỳnh to surrender the detonator. Newly immortal again, Andy catches up with Discord and fights her. Discord reveals that she has also lost her immortality and intends to use Nile to regain it. She stabs Andy in the heart, temporarily incapacitating her, then escapes with Andy's captured comrades. Discord warns Andy that she will be immortal if they meet again.

Andy takes Quỳnh to Tuah's library and helps her recover from her injuries. The two reconcile and vow to find Discord and rescue the remaining immortals.

== Cast ==
- Charlize Theron as Andy / Andromache of Scythia
- KiKi Layne as Nile Freeman
- Marwan Kenzari as Joe / Yusuf Al-Kaysani
- Luca Marinelli as Nicky / Nicolò di Genova
- Matthias Schoenaerts as Booker / Sébastien Le Livre
- Veronica Ngô as Quỳnh
- Chiwetel Ejiofor as James Copley
- Uma Thurman as Discord
- Henry Golding as Tuah

== Production ==
=== Development ===
In July 2020, Greg Rucka said, "In case of sequel, break glass. It's very straightforward. You want another one? Here's a way to get into it". In the same month, Charlize Theron had expressed her interest in a second film, saying: "Let's have a little resting period, but just given the fact that all of us really want to do it, I'm sure when it's the right time, we'll start the conversation."

It was reported on January 27, 2021, that Netflix had greenlit a sequel. On August 26, it was announced that Victoria Mahoney would direct the sequel, taking over for The Old Guard's original director Gina Prince-Bythewood who was busy with another project. Theron, KiKi Layne, Marwan Kenzari, Luca Marinelli, Matthias Schoenaerts, Vân Veronica Ngô, and Chiwetel Ejiofor were cast to reprise their respective roles from the first film. In June 2022, Uma Thurman and Henry Golding were cast in undisclosed roles, while Greg Rucka was confirmed to have written the script for producers David Ellison, Dana Goldberg, Don Granger, Theron, Beth Kono, AJ Dix, Marc Evans, and Prince-Bythewood.

=== Filming ===
Principal photography began in June 2022 in Italy. Some filming took place at the Italian Cinecittà Studios. In August 2022, the film's set caught fire while it was being dismantled, causing production to be delayed. Additional filming took place in the United Kingdom. Filming was completed in September 2022.

=== Post-production ===
In July 2024, Theron said that the film had been shut down five weeks into its post-production due to regime changes at Netflix, but had since been completed and would be released "soon". In August 2024, the Union of British Columbia Performers listed the film as being scheduled for two weeks of additional photography from October 7 to October 18, 2024. Matthew Schmidt serves as the editor.

== Music ==
By January 2023, Max Aruj and Ruth Barrett composed the film's score, replacing Volker Bertelmann and Dustin O'Halloran from the first film before Aruj was replaced as composing partner by Steffen Thum.

== Release ==
The Old Guard 2 was released on Netflix on July 2, 2025.

== Reception ==
On the review aggregator website Rotten Tomatoes, 27% of 109 critics' reviews are positive, with an average rating of 4.5/10. The website's consensus reads: "Bogged down by tedious lore and lackluster execution, The Old Guard 2 finds this budding franchise already long in the tooth." Metacritic, which uses a weighted average, assigned the film a score of 44 out of 100, based on 22 critics, indicating "mixed or average" reviews.
