= Young Hollywood Awards =

Entertainment awards voted by 13- to 19-year-olds

- Logo
- Awarded for: Outstanding Achievement in entertainment targeting teenagers and young adults.
- Country: United States
- Presented by: Fox; The CW (2013–2014)
- First award: 1999
- Final award: 2014

The Young Hollywood Awards was an annual awards ceremony that honored the year's biggest achievements in pop music, movies, sports, television, fashion and more, as voted on by teenagers aged 13–19 and young adults. The award ceremonies also honored rising and promising young aged performers in Hollywood. The award ceremony usually featured a high number of celebrities and musical performers such as Taylor Swift, Selena Gomez, and Nick Jonas.

The Young Hollywood Awards started in 1999. The final award ceremony was 2014.

== Categories ==
In 2010, the following categories were awarded:

- Young Hollywood Newcomer of the Year
- Young Hollywood Artist of the Year
- Young Hollywood Superstar in the Making
- Young Hollywood Breakthrough of the Year
- Young Hollywood Comedian of the Year
- Young Hollywood Cast to Watch
- Young Hollywood Making their Mark
- Young Hollywood Style Icon

The categories which have been removed from the awards were Superstar of Tomorrow and Best Role Model.

== Awards ceremonies ==
- 2013 Young Hollywood Awards
- 2014 Young Hollywood Awards
