= Victoria Mahoney =

American actress and filmmaker

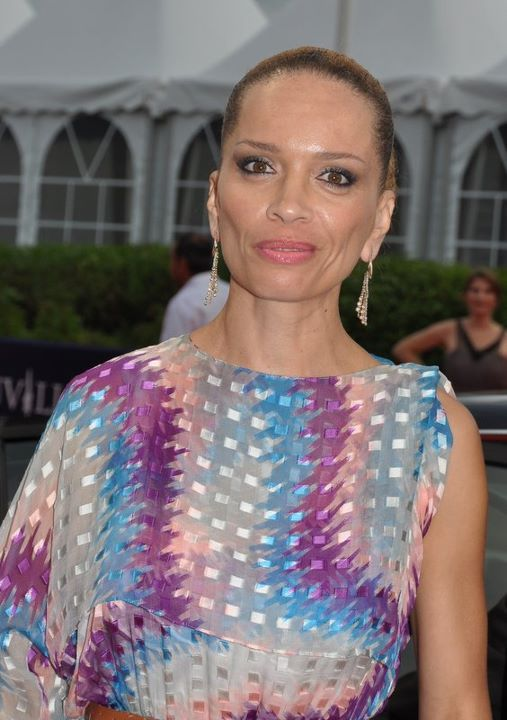
- Occupations: Filmmaker; producer; screenwriter; actress
- Years active: 1990–present

Victoria Mahoney is an American actress and filmmaker. Her debut feature was 2011’s Yelling to the Sky.

== Career ==
=== Acting ===
Throughout the 1990s and early 2000s Mahoney worked as an actress in largely unnamed roles, appearing in Seinfeld as the character Gladys and in the movie Legally Blonde. In 1992 she starred as Antinea in the French film L'Atlantide, based on the French novel Atlantida by Pierre Benoit. Her most recent appearance in front of the camera was a brief cameo in Ava DuVernay's short film Say Yes in 2013.

=== Directing ===
Victoria Mahoney made her feature directing debut in 2011 with the semi-autobiographical film Yelling to the Sky. The film follows a young girl’s struggle in high school and her difficult home life. She developed the script through the help of the Directors and Screenwriters Sundance Institute Labs and was awarded the titles of Auerbach Screenwriting Fellow, Annerberg Film Fellow, Cinereach Fellow, Maryland Fellow, IFP Narrative Lab fellow and a Tribeca Film Fellow. The film starred Zoe Kravitz as a troubled teen and Jason Clarke as her father.

Yelling to the Sky debuted in competition at the 61st Berlin International Film Festival and was nominated for the Golden Bear. Mahoney was the first woman director/writer, American invited in over sixty years to the Golden Bear competition. Variety gave the film a mixed review saying it had, "a strong directional voice struggling to be heard," and was, "strong on texture but taxingly light on narrative." Yelling to the Sky also screened at SXSW before releasing theatrically and on streaming in December, 2012.

In 2013, she was nominated for the inaugural Tribeca Film Institute's Heineken Affinity Award's $20,000 prize. In a profile accompanying her nomination, Mahoney explained what she wants people to take away from her films saying, “My overriding intentions as a filmmaker, is to tap into individual inquiries and reflect-whatever is hidden... From my filmmaking, I’d love audiences to receive some measure of inspiration; to investigate the human condition.” Mahoney ultimately lost to Ava DuVernay, with whom she would later partner on a television project in 2020.

In the same year, Mahoney directed a short film starring Selena Gomez and Shiloh Fernandez for Flaunt. She also directed several episodes of television shows, including Queen Sugar and You. In 2018 Mahoney was hired as second unit director on Star Wars: The Rise of Skywalker, marking her as the first woman to direct on a Star Wars film in the franchise's forty year history.

In 2020, Amazon Studios announced that Mahoney would be working with Ava DuVernay to adapt Octavia E. Butler’s sci-fi novel Dawn for television. In 2021, Netflix announced that Mahoney would take over directing duties from Gina Prince-Bythewood as director for The Old Guard 2. She was originally slated to direct the action film Shadow Force, but dropped out and was replaced by Joe Carnahan; Mahoney still received uncredited Additional Literary Material for her work on the screenplay.

== Filmography ==
Film

- Yelling to the Sky (2011) (Also writer and producer)
- The Old Guard 2 (2025)

Short film

- Wracked (2012) (Also producer)
- Searching (2013)

TV movies

- Bleach (2014)
- Under the Bridge (2024)

Television

Year	Title	Episode(s)
2016	Survivor's Remorse	"The Photoshoot"
2016	Queen Sugar	"By Any Chance"
2016	Grey's Anatomy	"Falling Slowly"
2017	American Crime	"Season Three: Episode Three"
2017	Gypsy	"Euphoria"
2017	Gypsy	"Marfa"
2017	Claws	"Fallout"
2017	Power	"That Ain't Me"
2018	Seven Seconds	"Witnesses for the Prosecution"
2018	You	"The Captain"
2019	I Am the Night	"Dark Flower"
2019	I Am the Night	"Matador"
2019	The Red Line	"We Must All Care" (Also producer)
2020	Lovecraft Country	"A History of Violence"
2021	The Morning Show	"Confirmations"
2022	Night Sky	"Lake Diving"
2024	Grey's Anatomy	"I Can See Clearly Now"
2025	Suits LA	"Pilot" (Also executive producer)
