= Reader's Digest Condensed Books =

Book series

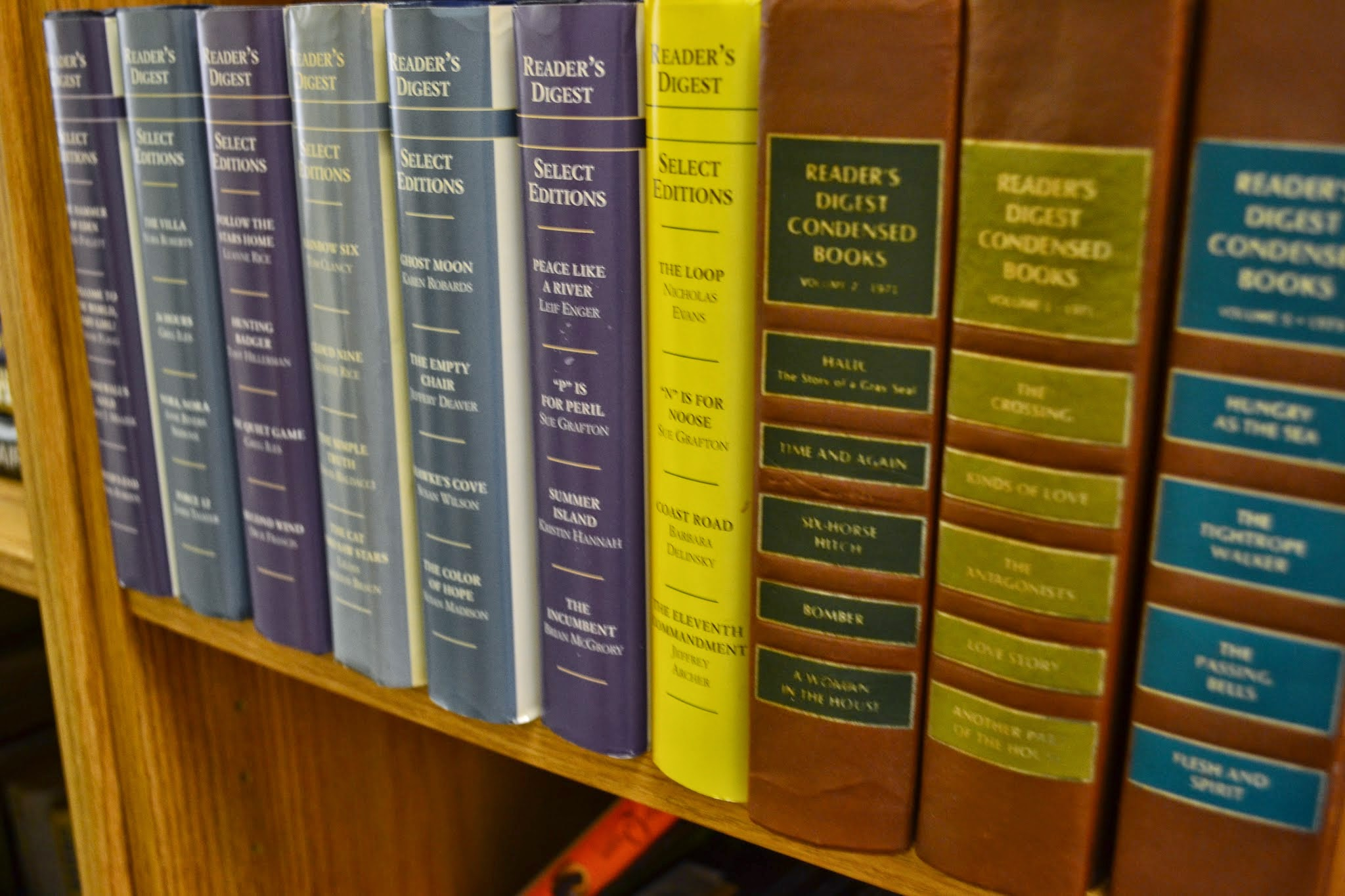
The spines of some Reader's Digest Condensed Books

Reader's Digest Condensed Books was a series of hardcover anthology collections, published by the American general interest monthly family magazine Reader's Digest and distributed by direct mail. Most volumes contained five (although a considerable minority consisted of three, four, or six) current best-selling novels and nonfiction books which were abridged (or "condensed") specifically for Reader's Digest. The series was published from 1950 until 1997, when it was renamed Reader's Digest Select Editions. Frequently featured authors in the original series include Dick Francis (17 titles), Henry Denker (16 titles), Victoria Holt (15 titles) and Mary Higgins Clark (13 titles).

The series was popular; a 1987 New York Times article estimated annual sales of 10 million copies. Despite this popularity, old copies are notoriously difficult to sell, and scholarly attention has been sparse.

For much of their publication schedule, the volumes were issued four times each year. Each year the company produced a Volume 1 (winter), Volume 2 (spring), Volume 3 (summer), and Volume 4 (autumn). In later years they added a Volumes 5, and then a Volume 6, going to a bi-monthly schedule by the early 1990s. The series was produced for 47 years (1950–1997), until being renamed Reader's Digest Select Editions. (Note: UK editions seem to have been somewhat different from US editions. Pre-1992 Canadian editions also contain different titles.)

Occasional books such as The Leopard (Summer 1960), The Days Were Too Short (Autumn 1960), and Papillon (Autumn 1970) were not published in English originally but were abridgments of translations. In some cases, advanced copies of the hardcover edition were printed in paperback form. In a few cases, new editions of older works (Up from Slavery, published originally in 1901 (Autumn 1960), A Roving Commission: My Early Life, published originally in 1930 (Autumn 1951) or Goodbye Mr. Chips, published originally in 1934 (Summer 1961)) were also among the condensed selections.

== 1950s ==
=== 1950 ===
Volume 1 – Spring

- The Show Must Go On – Elmer Rice
- The Cry and the Covenant – Morton Thompson
- Autobiography of Will Rogers – Donald Day, editor
- Cry, the Beloved Country – Alan Paton

Volume 2 – Summer

- The Wooden Horse – Eric Williams
- Home Town – Cleveland Amory
- Visibility Unlimited – Dick Grace
- The Way West – A. B. Guthrie Jr.

Volume 3 – Autumn

- The Cardinal – Henry Morton Robinson
- Long the Imperial Way – Hanama Taski
- Roosevelt in Retrospect – John Gunther
- Young Man with a Horn – Dorothy Baker

=== 1951 ===
Volume 4 – Winter

- Anybody Can Do Anything – Betty MacDonald
- Elephant Bill – Lt. Col. J. H. Williams
- Signal Thirty-Two – MacKinlay Kantor
- German Faces – Ann Stringer and Henry Ries
- Mischief – Charlotte Armstrong

Volume 5 – Spring

- Blandings' way – Eric Hodgins
- Operation Cicero – Ludwig Carl Moyzisch
- Two Soldiers / from collected stories – William Faulkner
- The Nymph and the Lamp – Thomas H. Raddall

Volume 6 – Summer

- The Caine Mutiny – Herman Wouk
- Neither Five Nor Three – Helen MacInnes
- Old Herbaceous – Reginald Arkell
- See How They Run – Don M. Mankiewicz

Volume 7 – Autumn

- Fallen Away – Margaret Culkin Banning
- Return to Paradise – James A. Michener
- A Roving Commission: My Early Life – Winston S. Churchill
- The Southwest Corner – Mildred Walker
- The Arms of Venus – John Appleby

=== 1952 ===
Volume 8 – Winter

- Melville Goodwin, USA – John P. Marquand
- The Cruel Sea – Nicholas Monsarrat
- A Genius in the Family – Hiram Percy Maxim
- "Monarch of Goddess Island" (The Plunderers) – Georges Blond
- To Catch a Thief – David Dodge

Volume 9 – Spring

- Adventures in Two Worlds – A. J. Cronin
- The Gabriel Horn – Felix Holt
- Duveen – S. N. Behrman
- "Kamante and Lulu" (Out of Africa) – Isak Dinesen
- East Side General – Frank G. Slaughter

Volume 10 – Summer

- The Hidden Flower – Pearl S. Buck
- The Dam Busters – Paul Brickhill
- The City Boy – Herman Wouk
- My Cousin Rachel – Daphne du Maurier

Volume 11 – Autumn

- Matador – Barnaby Conrad
- Witness – Whittaker Chambers
- "The Law of the Jungle" (My India) – Jim Corbett
- The President's Lady – Irving Stone

=== 1953 ===
Volume 12 – Winter

- Hunter – J.A. Hunter
- Giant – Edna Ferber
- Through Charley's Door – Emily Kimbrough
- The Best Cartoons from Punch – Marvin Rosenberg & William Cole, editors
- Island Rescue: An Appointment with Venus – Jerrard Tickell

Spring 1953 Selections

- Black Widow – Patrick Quentin
- The Silent World – Jacques-Yves Cousteau with Frédéric Dumas
- East of Eden – John Steinbeck
- Karen – Marie Killilea
- The Curve and The Tusk – Stuart Cloete

Volume 14 – Summer

- Our Virgin Island – Robb White
- A Bargain with God – Thomas Savage
- Annapurna – Maurice Herzog
- A Good Man – Jefferson Young
- The Intruder – Helen Fowler

Volume 15 – Autumn

- The Bridges at Toko-Ri – James A. Michener
- Beyond This Place – A. J. Cronin
- Life Among the Savages – Shirley Jackson
- My Crowded Solitude – Jack McLaren
- Digby – David Walker

=== 1954 ===
Volume 16 – Winter

- Call Me Lucky: Bing Crosby's Own Story – Bing Crosby with Pete Martin
- Too Late the Phalarope – Alan Paton
- Time and Time Again – James Hilton
- Heather Mary – J. M. Scott

Volume 17 – Spring

- The Night of the Hunter – Davis Grubb
- God and My Country – MacKinlay Kantor
- Not as a Stranger – Morton Thompson
- The Best Cartoons from France – Edna Bennett, collector
- The Young Elizabeth – Jennette & Francis Letton

Volume 18 – Summer

- The Desperate Hours – Joseph Hayes
- General Dean's Story – William F. Dean with William L. Worden
- Mr. Hobbs' Vacation – Edward Streeter
- The Power and the Prize – Howard Swiggett
- "The Duchess and the Smugs" (A Wreath for the Enemy) – Pamela Frankau
- Tomorrow! – Philip Wylie

Volume 19 – Autumn

- The Dollmaker – Harriette Arnow
- The Anatomy of a Crime – Joseph F. Dinneen
- Love is Eternal – Irving Stone
- Around a Rusty God – Augusta Walker
- The High and the Mighty – Ernest K. Gann

=== 1955 ===
Volume 20 – Winter

- The Reason Why – Cecil Woodham-Smith
- The China I Knew (My Several Worlds) – Pearl S. Buck
- My Brother's Keeper – Marcia Davenport
- Good Morning, Miss Dove – Frances Gray Patton
- The Darby Trial – Dick Pearce

Volume 22 – Summer

- Man-Eater – Jim Corbett
- The Actor – Niven Busch
- Onions in the Stew – Betty MacDonald
- The Captive City – John Appleby
- The Missing Macleans – Geoffrey Hoare
- The Searchers – Alan Le May

Volume 21 – Spring

- Good-bye, My Lady – James Street
- The Dowry – Margaret Culkin Banning
- The Day Lincoln Was Shot – Jim Bishop
- The Year the Yankees Lost the Pennant – Douglass Wallop
- Flamingo Feather – Laurens van der Post

Volume 23 – Autumn

- This is Goggle, or the Education of a Father – Bentz Plagemann
- Run Silent, Run Deep – Commander Edward L. Beach, USN
- Marjorie Morningstar – Herman Wouk
- Last of the Curlews – Fred Bodsworth
- First Train to Babylon – Max Ehrlich

=== 1956 ===
Volume 24 – Winter

- "The Secret of the Swamp" (Andersonville) – MacKinlay Kantor
- Island in the Sun – Alec Waugh
- An Episode of Sparrows – Rumer Godden
- Minding Our Own Business – Charlotte Paul
- The Long Ride Home – Bonner McMillion

Volume 25 – Spring

- Captain of the Queens – Captain Harry Grattidge with Richard Collier
- Beloved – Viña Delmar
- In My Father's House – Grace Nies Fletcher
- The Last Hurrah – Edwin O'Connor
- Boon Island – Kenneth Roberts

Volume 26 – Summer

- Old Yeller – Fred Gipson
- Harry Black – David Walker
- The Greer Case – David W. Peck
- A Thing of Beauty – A. J. Cronin
- A Single Pebble – John Hersey

Volume 27 – Autumn

- The Nun's Story – Kathryn Hulme
- Merry Christmas, Mr. Baxter – Edward Streeter
- The Success – Helen Howe
- The Diamond Hitch – Frank O'Rourke
- The Sleeping Partner – Winston Graham

=== 1957 ===
Volume 28 – Winter

- Bon Voyage – Marrijane & Joseph Hayes
- The Tribe That Lost Its Head – Nicholas Monsarrat
- The Philadelphian – Richard Powell
- A Family Party – John O'Hara
- Stopover: Tokyo – John P. Marquand

Volume 29 – Spring

- The Scapegoat – Daphne du Maurier
- The Last Angry Man – Gerald Green
- The Muses Are Heard – Truman Capote
- The Fruit Tramp – Vinnie Williams
- The Enemy Below – Commander D.A. Rayner

Volume 30 – Summer

- The Lady – Conrad Richter
- A Houseful of Love – Marjorie Housepian
- The Three Faces of Eve – Dr. Corbett H. Thigpen, MD & Dr. Hervey M. Cleckley, MD
- Letter from Peking – Pearl S. Buck
- The FBI Story – Don Whitehead
- "Mission to Borneo" (The Spiral Road) – Jan de Hartog

Volume 31 – Autumn

- Lobo – MacKinlay Kantor
- The Century of the Surgeon – Jürgen Thorwald
- By Love Possessed – James Gould Cozzens
- "Duel with a Witch Doctor" (The Spiral Road) – Jan de Hartog
- Warm Bodies – Donald R. Morris

=== 1958 ===
Volume 32 – Winter

- The Green Helmet – Jon Cleary
- Dunbar's Cove – Borden Deal
- The Twentieth Maine – John J. Pullen
- Life at Happy Knoll – John P. Marquand
- The Horsecatcher – Mari Sandoz
- Sharks and Little Fish – Wolfgang Ott

Volume 33 – Spring

- Big Caesar – Charlton Ogburn Jr.
- The Winthrop Woman – Anya Seton
- The Counterfeit Traitor – Alexander Klein
- The Man Who Broke Things – John Brooks
- Murder on My Street – Edwin Lanham

Volume 34 – Summer

- Seidman and Son – Elick Moll
- The Northern Light – A. J. Cronin
- Rough Road Home – Melissa Mather
- A Friend in Power – Carlos H. Baker
- Sun in the Hunter's Eyes – Mark Derby

Volume 35 – Autumn

- Preacher's Kids – Grace Nies Fletcher
- The Steel Cocoon – Bentz Plagemann
- Women and Thomas Harrow – John P. Marquand
- Green Mansions – W. H. Hudson
- Tether's End – Margery Allingham

=== 1959 ===
Volume 36 – Winter

- The Admen – Shepherd Mead
- The Rainbow and the Rose – Nevil Shute
- Mrs. 'Arris Goes to Paris – Paul Gallico
- The Ugly American – William J. Lederer & Eugene Burdick
- The White Room – Elizabeth Coatsworth
- Woman of Straw – Catherine Arley

Volume 37 – Spring

- The Secret Project of Sigurd O'Leary – Martin Quigley
- Dear and Glorious Physician – Taylor Caldwell
- Collision Course – Alvin Moscow
- Jungle Girl – John Moore
- Epitaph for an Enemy – George Barr

Volume 38 – Summer

- The Lion – Joseph Kessel
- The Light Infantry Ball – Hamilton Basso
- A Rockefeller Family Portrait – William Manchester
- "Trail to Abilene" (Born of the Sun) – John H. Culp
- The Big X – Hank Searls

Volume 39 – Autumn

- "West Wind to Hawaii" (Hawaii) – James A. Michener
- Advise and Consent – Allen Drury
- The Miracle of Merriford – Reginald Arkell
- Act One: An Autobiography – Moss Hart
- Flight from Ashiya – Elliott Arnold

== 1960s ==
=== 1960 ===
Volume 40 – Winter

- Jeremy Todd – Hamilton Maule
- "From the Farm of Bitterness" (Hawaii) – James A. Michener
- Pioneer, Go Home! – Richard Powell
- The City That Would Not Die – Richard Collier
- King Solomon's Ring – Konrad Z. Lorenz
- The Triumph of Surgery – Jürgen Thorwald

Volume 41 – Spring

- The Final Diagnosis – Arthur Hailey
- Mrs. 'Arris Goes to New York – Paul Gallico
- Strangers in the Forest – Carol Brink
- The Haunting of Hill House – Shirley Jackson
- Wolfpack – William M. Hardy

Volume 42 – Summer

- The Lovely Ambition – Mary Ellen Chase
- Trustee from the Toolroom – Nevil Shute
- The Leopard – Giuseppe di Lampedusa
- Village of Stars – Paul Stanton
- To Kill a Mockingbird – Harper Lee

Volume 43 – Autumn

- Surface at the Pole – Commander James F. Calvert, USN
- The Devil's Advocate – Morris L. West
- Up from Slavery – Booker T. Washington
- "Hook" (The Watchful Gods and Other Stories) – Walter Van Tilburg Clark
- Mistress of Mellyn – Victoria Holt
- The Days Were Too Short – Marcel Pagnol

=== 1961 ===
Volume 44 – Winter

- The Light in the Piazza – Elizabeth Spencer
- Half Angel – Barbara Jefferis
- A Sense of Values – Sloan Wilson
- "Warpath" (Northwest Passage) – Kenneth Roberts
- Marnie – Winston Graham

Volume 45 – Spring

- Fate Is the Hunter – Ernest K. Gann
- Peaceable Lane – Keith Wheeler
- Madame Curie – Ève Curie
- Evil Come, Evil Go – Whit Masterson
- The 'Mozart' Leaves at Nine – Harris Greene

Volume 46 – Summer

- The Winter of Our Discontent – John Steinbeck
- The Agony and the Ecstasy – Irving Stone
- The Making of the President, 1960 – Theodore H. White
- "A Lodging for the Emperor" (Japanese Inn) – Oliver Statler
- Goodbye, Mr. Chips – James Hilton

Volume 47 – Autumn

- Ring of Bright Water – Gavin Maxwell
- The Judas Tree – A. J. Cronin
- The Edge of Sadness – Edwin O'Connor
- A Fall of Moondust – Arthur C. Clarke
- A Christmas Carol – Charles Dickens
- Summer of Pride – Elizabeth Savage

=== 1962 ===
Volume 48 – Winter

- Spencer's Mountain – Earl Hamner Jr.
- A Prologue to Love – Taylor Caldwell
- A Time to Stand – Walter Lord
- Give It Back to the Lemongrowers! – Willard Temple
- Kirkland Revels – Victoria Holt

Volume 49 – Spring

- Captain Newman, MD – Leo Rosten
- Devil Water – Anya Seton
- The Story of San Michele – Axel Munthe
- Nine Hours to Rama – Stanley Wolpert
- Watchers at the Pond – Franklin Russell

Volume 50 – Summer

- The Tuntsa – Teppo Turen with Elizabeth Maddox McCabe
- Youngblood Hawke – Herman Wouk
- "Carol" (The Blood of the Lamb) – Peter De Vries
- Since You Ask Me – Ann Landers
- Star-Raker – Donald Gordon

Volume 51 – Autumn

- Dearly Beloved – Anne Morrow Lindbergh
- "Brickie" (To Love and Corrupt) – Joseph Viertel
- Seven Days in May – Fletcher Knebel & Charles W. Bailey II
- "The Wonderful World of School" (The World Is Young) – Wayne Miller
- Microbe Hunters – Paul de Kruif
- The Golden Rendezvous – Alistair MacLean

=== 1963 ===
Volume 52 – Winter

- Second Growth – Ruth Moore
- To Catch an Angel: Adventures in the World I Cannot See – Robert Russell
- I Take This Land – Richard Powell
- America, America – Elia Kazan
- "Hell Creek Crossing" (The Reivers) – William Faulkner
- Two Hours to Darkness – Antony Trew

Volume 53 – Spring

- A River Ran Out of Eden – James Vance Marshall
- Escape from Red China – Robert Loh with Humphrey Evans
- The Surgeon – W. C. Heinz
- Smith and Jones – Nicholas Monsarrat
- To Sir, With Love – E. R. Braithwaite
- ...and presumed dead – Lucille Fletcher

Volume 54 – Summer

- The Artist – Jan de Hartog
- The Shoes of the Fisherman – Morris L. West
- The Moonflower Vine – Jetta Carleton
- Florence Nightingale – Cecil Woodham-Smith
- The Wild Grapes – Barbara Jefferis

Volume 55 – Autumn

- The Tilsit Inheritance – Catherine Gaskin
- Stranger to the Ground – Richard Bach
- Of Good and Evil – Ernest K. Gann
- When the Legends Die – Hal Borland
- The Battle of the Villa Fiorita – Rumer Godden

=== 1964 ===
Volume 56 – Winter

- Naked Came I: A Novel of Rodin – David Weiss
- Joy in the Morning – Betty Smith
- The Peregrine Falcon – Robert Murphy
- Careful, He Might Hear You – Sumner Locke Elliott
- The Cincinnati Kid – Richard Jessup

Volume 57 – Spring

- Too Young to Be a Grandfather – Willard Temple
- When the Cheering Stopped – Gene Smith
- I Was Dancing – Edwin O'Connor
- Alone – Rear Admiral Richard E. Byrd
- The Hand of Mary Constable – Paul Gallico
- Nerve – Dick Francis

Volume 58 – Summer

- Father to the Man – Bentz Plagemann
- The Spy Who Came in from the Cold – John le Carré
- "Gold Fever" (When the Lion Feeds) – Wilbur A. Smith
- The Vine and the Olive – Margaret Culkin Banning
- The Flight of the Phoenix – Elleston Trevor

Volume 59 – Autumn

- A Song of Sixpence – A.J. Cronin
- Strangers on a Bridge: The Case of Colonel Abel, Soviet Master Spy – James B. Donovan
- Three Blind Mice – Agatha Christie
- Episode – Eric Hodgins
- The Island – Robert Merle

=== 1965 ===
Volume 60 – Winter

- The Sea Flower – Ruth Moore
- The Man – Irving Wallace
- A Ship Called Hope – William B. Walsh, MD
- The Third Day – Joseph Hayes
- The Land Breakers – John Ehle

Volume 61 – Spring

- A Journey to Boston – Mary Ellen Chase
- "Hotel St. Gregory" (Hotel) – Arthur Hailey
- A Pillar of Iron – Taylor Caldwell
- Eighth Moon – Sansan with Bette Lord
- The Ashes of Loda – Andrew Garve

Volume 62 – Summer

- May You Die in Ireland – Michael Kenyon
- Intern – Dr. X
- The Source – James A. Michener
- Night of Camp David – Fletcher Knebel
- A House of Many Rooms – Rodello Hunter

Volume 63 – Autumn

- Airs Above the Ground – Mary Stewart
- Up the Down Staircase – Bel Kaufman
- Those Who Love – Irving Stone
- The Kon-Tiki Expedition – Thor Heyerdahl
- How Far to Bethlehem? – Norah Lofts

=== 1966 ===
Volume 64 – Winter

- Outpost of Freedom – Captain Roger H. C. Donlon with Warren Rogers
- The Double Image – Helen MacInnes
- The Yearling – Marjorie Kinnan Rawlings
- The Century of the Detective – Jürgen Thorwald
- "The Way of the Eagle" (The Last Eagle) – Daniel P. Mannix
- So This Is What Happened to Charlie Moe – Douglass Wallop

Volume 65 – Spring

- Hall of Mirrors – John Rowan Wilson
- Avalon – Anya Seton
- Children of Hope – Elsie E. Vignec
- Congo Kitabu – Jean-Pierre Hallet with Alex Pelle
- Power Play – The Gordons

Volume 66 – Summer

- Rafe – Weldon Hill
- Churchill: The Struggle for Survival – Lord Moran
- Here Come the Brides – Geraldine Napier
- The Ninety and Nine – William Brinkley
- Menfreya in the Morning – Victoria Holt

Volume 67 – Autumn

- Don Quixote, U.S.A. – Richard Powell
- All in the Family – Edwin O'Connor
- Saturday the Rabbi Went Hungry – Harry Kemelman
- The Gift of the Deer – Helen Hoover
- Brothers of the Sea – D.R. Sherman

=== 1967 ===
Volume 68 – Winter

- The Town and Dr. Moore – Agatha Young
- The Captain – Jan de Hartog
- Flight from a Firing Wall – Baynard Kendrick
- The Headmaster – John McPhee
- I Start Counting – Audrey Erskine Lindop

Volume 69 – Spring

- My Boy John That Went to Sea – James Vance Marshall
- One Summer in Between – Melissa Mather
- The Broken Seal – Ladislas Farago
- Dibs in Search of Self – Virginia Axline
- The Road – John Ehle
- Sally – E. V. Cunningham

Volume 70 – Summer

- The Princess – Gunnar Mattsson
- At Ease: Stories I Tell to Friends – Dwight D. Eisenhower
- The Least One – Borden Deal
- Currahee! – Donald R. Burgett
- The Walking Stick – Winston Graham

Volume 71 – Autumn

- Christy – Catherine Marshall
- Life with Father – Clarence Day
- The Fox and the Hound – Daniel P. Mannix
- Nicholas and Alexandra – Robert K. Massie
- The Gabriel Hounds – Mary Stewart

=== 1968 ===
Volume 72 – Winter

- Edge of Glass – Catherine Gaskin
- Great Elephant – Alan Scholefield
- Color from a Light Within – Donald Braider
- The Kitchen Madonna – Rumer Godden
- Vanished – Fletcher Knebel

Volume 73 – Spring

- The New Year – Pearl S. Buck
- The Tower of Babel – Morris L. West
- Airport – Arthur Hailey
- To the Top of the World – Charles Kuralt
- The Bait – Dorothy Uhnak

Volume 74 – Summer

- Once Upon an Island – David Conover
- Bush Baby – Martin Woodhouse
- The Queen's Confession – Victoria Holt
- Leafy Rivers – Jessamyn West
- The Crossbreed – Allan W. Eckert

Volume 75 – Autumn

- The Johnstown Flood – David G. McCullough
- Once an Eagle – Anton Myrer
- Ammie, Come Home – Barbara Michaels
- Gone: A Trio of Short Stories – Rumer Godden
- Sarang – Roger A. Caras

=== 1969 ===
Volume 76 – Winter

- Miss One Thousand Spring Blossoms – John Ball
- The Hurricane Years – Cameron Hawley
- The Wine and the Music – William E. Barrett
- On Reflection – Helen Hayes with Sandford Dody
- The Black Ship – Paul & Sheila Mandel

Volume 77 – Spring

- The Two of Us – Claude Berri
- Bichu the Jaguar – Alan Caillou
- The Minister – Charles Mercer
- Mayo: The Story of My Family and My Career – Dr. Charles W. Mayo
- Torregreca – Ann Cornelisen
- April Morning – Howard Fast

Volume 78 – Summer

- A Place in the Woods – Helen Hoover
- The Death Committee – Noah Gordon
- The Man from Monticello: An Intimate Life of Thomas Jefferson – Thomas Fleming
- The Three Daughters of Madame Liang – Pearl S. Buck
- Snatch – Rennie Airth

Volume 79 – Autumn

- The King's Pleasure – Norah Lofts
- The Day the World Ended – Gordon Thomas & Max Morgan-Witts
- My Life with Martin Luther King Jr. – Coretta Scott King
- In This House of Brede – Rumer Godden
- The Black Camels – Ronald Johnston

== 1970s ==
=== 1970 ===
Volume 80 – Winter

- Waiting for Willa – Dorothy Eden
- A Walk to the Hills of the Dreamtime – James Vance Marshall
- T.R. – Noel B. Gerson
- Heartsblood – Paul Martin
- The Witness – Dorothy Uhnak

Volume 81 – Spring

- Kim: A Gift from Vietnam – Frank W. Chinnock
- Bless the Beasts & Children – Glendon Swarthout
- Great Lion of God – Taylor Caldwell
- I Chose Prison – James V. Bennett
- Fiona – Catherine Gaskin

Volume 82 – Summer

- Operation Sippacik – Rumer Godden
- The Secret Woman – Victoria Holt
- Christiaan Barnard – One Life – Christiaan Barnard & Curtis Bill Pepper
- The Song of Bernadette – Franz Werfel
- The Shattered Dream – Gene Smith

Volume 83 – Autumn

- Lone Woman – Dorothy Clarke Wilson
- The Homecoming – Earl Hamner Jr.
- Papillon – Henri Charrière
- Whitewater – Paul Horgan
- The Unexpected Mrs. Pollifax – Dorothy Gilman

=== 1971 ===
Volume 84 – Winter

- The Crossing – Howard Fast
- Kinds of Love – May Sarton
- The Antagonists – Ernest K. Gann
- Love Story – Erich Segal
- Another Part of the House – Winston M. Estes

Volume 85 – Spring

- Halic: The Story of a Gray Seal – Ewan Clarkson
- Time and Again – Jack Finney
- Six-Horse Hitch – Janice Holt Giles
- Bomber – Len Deighton
- A Woman in the House – Wm. E. Barrett

Volume 86 – Summer

- The White Dawn – James Houston
- Risk – Rachel MacKenzie
- Lifeboat Number Two – Margaret Culkin Banning
- Because I Loved Him: The Life and Loves of Lillie Langtry – Noel B. Gerson
- The Sea of Grass – Conrad Richter
- The Possession of Joel Delaney – Ramona Stewart

Volume 87 – Autumn

- A Timeless Place – Ellen Bromfield Geld
- The San Francisco Earthquake – Gordon Thomas & Max Morgan-Witts
- Wheels – Arthur Hailey
- People I Have Loved, Known or Admired – Leo Rosten
- Summer of the Red Wolf – Morris West

=== 1972 ===
Volume 88 – Winter

- The Amazing Mrs. Pollifax – Dorothy Gilman
- The Winds of War – Herman Wouk
- The Runaways – Victor Canning

Volume 89 – Spring

- Wild Goose, Brother Goose – Mel Ellis
- Event 1000 – David Lavallee
- Bring Me a Unicorn – Anne Morrow Lindbergh
- Hearts – Thomas Thompson
- The Day of the Jackal – Frederick Forsyth

Volume 90 – Summer

- A Falcon for a Queen – Catherine Gaskin
- Meeting With a Great Beast – Leonard Wibberley
- Blockbuster – Gerald Green
- The Shape of Illusion – Wm. E.Barrett
- Duel in the Snow – Hans Meissner

Volume 91 – Autumn

- The Waltz Kings: Johann Strauss, Father & Son, and Their Romantic Age – Hans Fantel
- The Terminal Man – Michael Crichton
- The Dwelling Place – Catherine Cookson
- A World to Care For – Howard A. Rusk, MD
- The Hessian – Howard Fast

=== 1973 ===
Volume 92 – #1

- The Stepford Wives – Ira Levin
- The Odessa File – Frederick Forsyth
- A Day No Pigs Would Die – Robert Newton Peck
- Stanfield Harvest – Richard Martin Stern
- P.S. Your Not Listening – Eleanor Craig

Volume 93 – #2

- A Palm for Mrs. Pollifax – Dorothy Gilman
- The Camerons – Robert Crichton
- The Japanese – Jack Seward
- Green Darkness – Anya Seton

Volume 94 – #3

- Sadie Shapiro's Knitting Book – Robert Kimmel Smith
- The Years of the Forest – Helen Hoover
- The Taking of Pelham One Two Three – John Godey
- The Curse of the Kings – Victoria Holt
- Captain Bligh and Mr. Christian – Richard Hough

Volume 95 – #4

- La Balsa: The Longest Raft Voyage in History – Vital Alsar with Enrique Hank Lopez
- The Sunbird – Wilbur Smith
- State Trooper – Noel B. Gerson
- The Search for Anna Fisher – Florence Fisher
- Mrs. Starr Lives Alone – Jon Godden

Volume 96 – #5

- All Creatures Great and Small – James Herriot
- The Salamander – Morris West
- A Thousand Summers – Garson Kanin
- Shipwreck: The Strange Fate of the Morro Castle – Gordon Thomas and Max Morgan-Witts

=== 1974 ===
Volume 97 – #1

- The Tower – Richard Martin Stern
- Incident at Hawk's Hill – Allan W. Eckert
- Stay of Execution: A Sort of Memoir – Stewart Alsop
- The Mountain Farm – Ernest Raymond
- The Thirteenth Trick – Russell Braddon

Volume 98 – #2

- A Member of the Family – Mary Carter
- The Kappillan of Malta – Nicholas Monsarrat
- In Darkness – Roger Bourgeon
- Jaws – Peter Benchley

Volume 99 – #3

- The Will of Magda Townsend – Margaret Culkin Banning
- Forever Island – Patrick D. Smith
- Thirty-Four East – Alfred Coppel
- The Diddakoi – Rumer Godden
- Lion in the Evening – Alan Scholefield

Volume 100 – #4

- The Boy Who Invented the Bubble Gun – Paul Gallico
- The Good Shepherd – Thomas Fleming
- The Property of a Gentleman – Catherine Gaskin
- His Majesty's U-Boat – Douglas Reeman

Volume 101 – #5

- The Other Room – Borden Deal
- The Dogs of War – Frederick Forsyth
- All Things Bright and Beautiful – James Herriot
- Malevil – Robert Merle
- A Daughter of Zion – Rodello Hunter

=== 1975 ===
Volume 102 – #1

- Our John Willie – Catherine Cookson
- Centennial – James A. Michener
- Harlequin – Morris West
- Eric – Doris Lund

Volume 103 – #2

- Lost! – Thomas Thompson
- Baker's Hawk – Jack Bickham
- The Physicians – Henry Denker
- God and Mr. Gomez – Jack Smith
- Eagle in the Sky – Wilbur Smith

Volume 104 – #3

- Mrs. 'arris Goes to Moscow – Paul Gallico
- The Moneychangers – Arthur Hailey
- The Massacre at Fall Creek – Jessamyn West
- Collision – Spencer Dunmore

Volume 105 – #4

- Where are the Children? – Mary Higgins Clark
- Earthsound – Arthur Herzog
- The Eagle Has Landed – Jack Higgins
- Daylight Must Come – Alan Burgess
- The Wind at Morning – James Vance Marshall

Volume 106 – #5

- Lord of the Far Island – Victoria Holt
- Alexander Dolgun's Story: An American in the Gulag – Alexander Dolgun with Patrick Watson
- Minnie Santangelo's Mortal Sin – Anthony Mancini
- A Sporting Proposition – James Aldridge
- Power – Richard Martin Stern

=== 1976 ===
Volume 107 – #1

- The Great Train Robbery – Michael Crichton
- I Take Thee, Serenity – Daisy Newman
- Bill W. – Robert Thomsen
- A Town Like Alice – Nevil Shute

Volume 108 – #2

- The Hostage Heart – Gerald Green
- They Came to Stay – Marjorie Margolies & Ruth Gruber
- The Tide of Life – Catherine Cookson
- Swan Watch – Budd Schulberg
- Drummer in the Dark – Francis Clifford

Volume 109 – #3

- Liberty Tavern – Thomas Fleming
- The Pilot – Robert Davis
- Touch Not the Cat – Mary Stewart
- The Boys from Brazil – Ira Levin

Volume 110 – #4

- The Distant Summer – Sarah Patterson
- The Olmec Head – David Westheimer
- The Matthew Tree – H. T. Wright
- The Splendid Torments – Margaret Culkin Banning
- Harry's Game – Gerald Seymour

Volume 111 – #5

- The Pride of the Peacock – Victoria Holt
- "Bobbitt" – Thomas Tryon
- The Experiment – Henry Denker
- Ordinary People – Judith Guest
- Storm Warning – Jack Higgins

=== 1977 ===
Volume 112 – #1

- Mrs. Pollifax on Safari – Dorothy Gilman
- The R Document – Irving Wallace
- Home Before Dark – Sue Ellen Bridgers
- The Glory Boys – Gerald Seymour
- The Spuddy – Lillian Beckwith

Volume 113 – #2

- The Slow Awakening – Catherine Marchant
- 19 Steps Up the Mountain – Joseph P. Blank
- Ghost Fox – James Houston
- In the Frame – Dick Francis

Volume 114 – #3

- Tisha – Robert Specht
- The Dragon – Alfred Coppel
- Oliver's Story – Erich Segal
- Majesty – Robert Lacey
- Overboard – Hank Searls

Volume 115 – #4

- The Stone Bull – Phyllis Whitney
- Enola Gay – Gordon Thomas & Max Morgan Witts
- Sadie Shapiro in Miami – Robert Kimmel Smith
- The Scofield Diagnosis – Henry Denker

Volume 116 – #5

- The Melodeon – Glendon Swarthout
- Full Disclosure – William Safire
- Bel Ria – Sheila Burnford
- Chase the Wind – E. V. Thompson
- The Fan – Bob Randall

=== 1978 ===
Volume 117 – #1

- Snowbound Six – Richard Martin Stern
- The Summer of the Spanish Woman – Catherine Gaskin
- Elephants in the Living Room, Bears in the Canoe – Earl & Liz Hammond with Elizabeth Levy
- Arrest Sitting Bull – Douglas C. Jones
- I Can Jump Puddles – Alan Marshall

Volume 118 – #2

- Jaws 2 – Hank Searls
- The Education of Little Tree – Forrest Carter
- The Practice – Dr. Alan E. Nourse
- Excellency – David Beaty

Volume 119 – #3

- A Stranger is Watching – Mary Higgins Clark
- The Miracle of Dommatina – Ira Avery
- The Last Convertible – Anton Myrer
- Such a Life – Edith LaZebnik

Volume 120 – #4

- My Enemy the Queen – Victoria Holt
- The Good Old Boys – Elmer Kelton
- By the Rivers of Babylon – Nelson DeMille
- Breakpoint – William Brinkley

Volume 121 – #5

- Summer Lightning – Judith Richards
- Tara Kane – George Markstein
- Flight into Danger – Arthur Hailey & John Castle
- Raquela; A Woman Of Israel – Ruth Gruber
- The Snake – John Godey

=== 1979 ===
Volume 122 – #1

- Eye of the Needle – Ken Follett
- Orphan Train – James Magnuson & Dorothea Petrie
- Overload – Arthur Hailey
- A Dangerous Magic – Frances Lynch

Volume 123 – #2

- Dinah, Blow Your Horn – Jack Bickham
- War and Remembrance – Herman Wouk
- How I Got to be Perfect – Jean Kerr

Volume 124 – #3

- Sunflower – Marilyn Sharp
- Running Proud – Nicholas Monsarrat
- Error of Judgment – Henry Denker
- A Walk Across America – Peter Jenkins

Volume 125 – #4

- Sphinx – Robin Cook
- Cold is the Sea – Capt. Edward L. Beach Jr.
- Words by Heart – Ouida Sebestyen
- The North Runner – R. D. Lawrence
- Intruder – Louis Charbonneau

Volume 126 – #5

- Hungry as the Sea – Wilbur Smith
- The Tightrope Walker – Dorothy Gilman
- The Passing Bells – Phillip Rock
- Flesh and Spirit – Elizabeth Christman

== 1980s ==
=== 1980 ===
Volume 127 – #1

- Domino – Phyllis Whitney
- Passage West – Dallas Miller
- Horowitz and Mrs. Washington – Henry Denker
- To Catch a King – Harry Patterson

Volume 128 – #2

- Emma and I – Sheila Hocken
- The Devil's Alternative – Frederick Forsyth
- The Capricorn Stone – Madeleine Brent
- Flood – Richard Martin Stern

Volume 129 – M

- Amanda/Miranda – Richard Peck
- Ice Brothers – Sloan Wilson
- The Small Outsider – Joan Martin Hundley
- The Silver Falcon – Evelyn Anthony

Volume 130 – #3

- Thursday's Child – Victoria Poole
- Random Winds – Belva Plain
- A Very Private War – Jon Cleary
- Control Tower – Robert P. Davis

Volume 131 – #4

- Sadie Shapiro, Matchmaker – Robert Kimmel Smith
- The Cradle Will Fall – Mary Higgins Clark
- Man, Woman and Child – Erich Segal
- Bess and Harry: An American Love Story – Jhan Robbins
- The Wolf and the Buffalo – Elmer Kelton

Volume 132 – #5

- No Job for a Lady – Phyllis Lose, V.M.D.
- The Key to Rebecca – Ken Follett
- The Old Neighborhood – Avery Corman
- A Piano for Mrs. Cimino – Robert Oliphant
- The Gold of Troy – Robert L. Fish

=== 1981 ===
Volume 133 – #1

- The Aviator – Ernest K. Gann
- The Covenant – James A. Michener
- Hope – Richard Meryman
- Bullet Train – Joseph Rance & Arei Kato

Volume 134 – #2

- One Child – Torey Hayden
- Banners of Silk – Rosalind Laker
- The Gentle Jungle – Toni Ringo Helfer
- Reflex – Dick Francis

Volume 135 – M

- Lincoln's Mothers: A Story of Nancy and Sally Lincoln – Dorothy Clarke Wilson
- The Last Step – Rick Ridgeway
- All the Days were Summer – Jack M. Bickham
- Flight to Landfall – G.M. Glaskin

Volume 136 – #3

- Still Missing – Beth Gutcheon
- A Princess in Berlin – Arthur Solmssen
- The Warfield Syndrome – Henry Denker
- The Dam – Robert Byrne

Volume 137 – #4

- The Lord God Made Them All – James Herriot
- An Exceptional Marriage – Jack Shepherd
- Texas Dawn – Phillip Finch
- Crossing in Berlin – Fletcher Knebel

Volume 138 – #5

- Vermilion – Phyllis Whitney
- Totaled – Frances Rickett & Steven McGraw
- Ike and Mamie: The Story of the General and His Lady – Lester David & Irene David
- The Dark Horse – Rumer Godden
- Fortress – Gabrielle Lord

=== 1982 ===
Volume 139 – #1

- Through the Narrow Gate – Karen Armstrong
- Noble House – James Clavell
- The Judas Kiss – Victoria Holt

Volume 140 – #2

- Alone Against the Atlantic – Gerry Spiess (with Marlin Bree)
- A Green Desire – Anton Myrer
- Going Wild: Adventures of a Zoo Vet – David Taylor
- The Man Who Lived at the Ritz – A. E. Hotchner

Volume 141 – M

- Fever – Robin Cook
- The Walk West: A Walk Across America 2 – Peter Jenkins
- Gilded Splendour – Rosalind Laker
- Twice Shy – Dick Francis

Volume 142 – #3

- The Man from St. Petersburg – Ken Follett
- Pioneer Women: Voices from the Kansas Frontier – Joanna Stratton
- No Escape – Joseph Hayes
- The Citadel – A.J. Cronin

Volume 143 – #4

- Flanagan's Run – Tom McNab
- A Parting Gift – Frances Sharkey, M.D.
- The Big Bridge – Richard Martin Stern
- Last Quadrant – Meira Chand

Volume 144 – #5

- Jane's House – Robert Kimmel Smith
- China: Alive In The Bitter Sea – Fox Butterfield
- Promises – Catherine Gaskin
- Outrage – Henry Denker

=== 1983 ===
Volume 145 – #1

- A Cry in the Night – Mary Higgins Clark
- Indian Summer of the Heart – Daisy Newman
- Touch the Devil – Jack Higgins
- The Winter of the White Seal – Marie Herbert

Volume 146 – #2

- Pacific Interlude – Sloan Wilson
- The Whip – Catherine Cookson
- Open Heart – Mary Bringle
- Banker – Dick Francis

Volume 147 – M

- The Girl of the Sea of Cortez – Peter Benchley
- Jedder's Land – Maureen O'Donoghue
- Run Before the Wind – Stuart Woods
- Impressionist: A Novel of Mary Cassatt – Joan King

Volume 148 – #3

- Mrs. Pollifax on the China Station – Dorothy Gilman
- The Brea File – Louis Charbonneau
- Growing Up – Russell Baker
- Octavia's Hill – Margaret Dickson

Volume 149 – #4

- The Secret Annie Oakley – Marcy Heidish
- Talk Down – Brian Lecomber
- Jewelled Path – Rosalind Laker
- A Solitary Dance – Robert Lane

Volume 150 – #5

- Godplayer – Robin Cook
- The Suitcases – Anne Hall Whitt
- The Time of the Hunter's Moon – Victoria Holt
- Stalking Point – Duncan Kyle

=== 1984 ===
Volume 151 – #1

- The Children's Game – David Wise
- Beyond All Frontiers – Emma Drummond
- The Incredible Journey – Sheila Burnford
- From This Day Forward – Nancy Rossi

Volume 152 – #2

- Arnie, The Darling Starling – Margarete Sigl Corbo & Diane Marie Barras
- Night Sky – Clare Francis
- The Canyon – Jack Schaefer
- If We Could Hear the Grass Grow – Eleanor Craig

Volume 153 – M

- The Cop and The Kid – William Fox with Noel Hynd
- Tiger, Tiger – Philip Caveney
- Kincaid – Henry Denker
- The Whale of the Victoria Cross – Pierre Boulle

Volume 154 – #3

- Skyscraper – Robert Byrne
- A Shine of Rainbows – Lillian Beckwith
- The Reckoning – Phillip Finch
- Lady Washington – Dorothy Clarke Wilson

Volume 155 – #4

- Nop's Trials – Donald McCaig
- Lee and Grant – Gene Smith
- Murder and the First Lady – Elliott Roosevelt
- Jennie About To Be – Elisabeth Ogilvie

Volume 156 – #5

- Hanna and Walter – Hanna & Walter Kohner
- Stormswift – Madeleine Brent
- The Sound of Wings – Spencer Dunmore
- Surprise Party – William Katz

=== 1985 ===
Volume 157 – #1

- Lovestrong – Dorothy Greenbaum, MD & Deidre Laiken
- Stillwatch – Mary Higgins Clark
- Crescent City – Belva Plain
- The Wild Children – Felice Holman

Volume 158 – #2

- Julie – Catherine Marshall
- Strong Medicine – Arthur Hailey
- Polsinney Harbour – Mary E. Pearce
- Proof – Dick Francis

Volume 159 – M

- The State of Stony Lonesome – Jessamyn West
- At The Going Down of the Sun – Elizabeth Darrell
- Callanish – William Horwood
- Find a Safe Place – Alexander Lazzarino & E. Kent Hayes

Volume 160 – #3

- In Love and War – Jim & Sybil Stockdale
- Ringo, the Robber Raccoon – Robert Franklin Leslie
- This Giving Heart – Hugh Miller
- Twilight Child – Warren Adler

Volume 161 – #4

- Robert, My Son – Henry Denker
- The Bannaman Legacy – Catherine Cookson
- The Cheetahs – Alan Caillou
- This Shining Land – Rosalind Laker

Volume 162 – #5

- Voices on the Wind – Evelyn Anthony
- Trauma – John Fried & John G. West, MD
- The Donkey's Gift – Thomas M. Coffey
- The Double Man – William Cohen & Gary Hart

=== 1986 ===
Volume 163 – #1

- Mrs. Pollifax and the Hong Kong Buddha – Dorothy Gilman
- Wildfire – Richard Martin Stern
- Arnie & a House Full of Company – Margarete Corbo & Diane Marie Barras
- Take Away One – Thomas Froncek
- The Two Farms – Mary Pearce

Volume 164 – #2

- An Ark on the Flood – Anne Knowles
- The Seventh Secret – Irving Wallace
- Come Spring – Charlotte Hinger
- Break In – Dick Francis

Volume 165 – M

- Deep Lie – Stuart Woods
- Bess W. Truman: An American Courtship – Margaret Truman
- In A Place Dark and Secret – Phillip Finch
- The Summer of the Barshinskeys – Diane Pearson

Volume 166 – #3

- Lie Down with Lions – Ken Follett
- Tree of Gold – Rosalind Laker
- The Deep End – Joy Fielding
- Cry Wild – R. D. Lawrence

Volume 167 – #4

- Silversword – Phyllis Whitney
- Texas – James Michener
- Bracken – Elizabeth Webster

Volume 168 – #5

- The Judgment – Howard Goldfluss
- Kaffir Boy – Mark Mathabane
- Unnatural Causes – Mark Olshaker
- Queen Dolley – Dorothy Clarke Wilson

=== 1987 ===
Volume 169 – #1

- A Matter of Honor – Jeffrey Archer
- The Golden Cup – Belva Plain
- Stepping Down from the Star – Alexandra Costa
- A Deadly Presence – Hjalmer Thesen

Volume 170 – #2

- A Place To Hide – Evelyn Anthony
- A Time For Heroes – Will Bryant
- East and West – Gerald Green
- Nightshade – Gloria Murphy

Volume 171 – M

- Carter's Castle – Wilbur Wright
- New Orleans Legacy – Alexandra Ripley
- To Kill the Potemkin – Mark Joseph
- Anne Frank Remembered – Miep Gies & Alison Leslie Gold

Volume 172 – #3

- Bolt – Dick Francis
- The Night Lives On – Walter Lord
- The Choice – Henry Denker
- The Ladies of Missalonghi – Colleen McCullough
- Night of the Fox – Jack Higgins

Volume 173 – #4

- Windmills of the Gods – Sidney Sheldon
- Unholy Matrimony – John Dillmann
- The Silver Touch – Rosalind Laker
- Outbreak – Robin Cook

Volume 174 – #5

- Patriot Games – Tom Clancy
- Snow on the Wind – Hugh Miller
- Memoirs of an Invisible Man – H. F. Saint
- The Man Who Rode Midnight – Elmer Kelton

=== 1988 ===
Volume 175 – #1

- Mrs. Pollifax and the Golden Triangle – Dorothy Gilman
- Not Without My Daughter – Betty Mahmoody with William Hoffer
- The Seizing of Yankee Green Mall – Ridley Pearson
- O Come Ye Back to Ireland – Niall Williams & Christine Breen

Volume 176 – #2

- Hot Money – Dick Francis
- Jenny's Mountain – Elaine Long
- Trespass – Phillip Finch
- Sara Dane – Catherine Gaskin

Volume 177 – M

- Wolf Winter – Clare Francis
- Johnnie Alone – Elizabeth Webster
- Man With a Gun – Robert Daley
- Winner – Maureen O'Donoghue

Volume 178 – #3

- Mortal Fear – Robin Cook
- Just Another Kid – Torey Hayden
- Rockets' Red Glare – Greg Dinallo
- Brownstone Facade – Catherine M. Rae

Volume 179 – #4

- Tsunami – Richard Martin Stern
- The Harrogate Secret – Catherine Cookson
- The Charm School – Nelson DeMille
- A Walk in the Dark – Joyce Stranger

Volume 180 – #5

- The India Fan – Victoria Holt
- Mannequin – Robert Byrne
- Lady of No Man's Land – Jeanne Williams
- Wildtrack – Bernard Cornwell

=== 1989 ===
Volume 181 – #1

- A Gift of Life – Henry Denker
- Daddy – Loup Durand
- Norman Rockwell's Greatest Painting – Hollis Hodges
- Murder in the Oval Office – Elliott Roosevelt

Volume 182 – #2

- The Edge – Dick Francis
- Alaska – James Michener
- Thornyhold – Mary Stewart

Volume 183 – M

- Doctors – Erich Segal
- Gracie – George Burns
- The Giant's Shadow – Thomas Bontly
- The Toothache Tree – Jack Galloway

Volume 184 – #3

- Morning Glory – LaVyrle Spencer
- Toy Soldiers – William P. Kennedy
- Trail – Louis Charbonneau
- Prospect – Bill Littlefield

Volume 185 – #4

- While My Pretty One Sleeps – Mary Higgins Clark
- The Bailey Chronicles – Catherine Cookson
- The Negotiator – Frederick Forsyth
- Hallapoosa – Robert Newton Peck

Volume 186 – #5

- Killer's Wake – Bernard Cornwell
- Blessings – Belva Plain
- Grass Roots – Stuart Woods
- Alice and Edith – Dorothy Clarke Wilson

== 1990s ==
=== 1990 ===
Volume 187 – #1

- Tiebreaker – Jack Bickham
- What was Good About Today – Carol Kruckeberg
- California Gold – John Jakes
- Monkeys on the Interstate – Jack Hanna w/ John Stravinsky

Volume 188 – #2

- Straight – Dick Francis
- No Roof But Heaven – Jeanne Williams
- The Evening News – Arthur Hailey
- The Courtship of Peggy McCoy – Ray Sipherd

Volume 189 – M

- The Lady of the Labyrinth – Caroline Llewellyn
- The Himmler Equation – William P. Kennedy
- Flying Free – Dan True
- A Time to Love – Beryl Kingston

Volume 190 – #3

- Harmful Intent – Robin Cook
- The Flight of the Swan – Elizabeth Webster
- The Estuary Pilgrim – Douglas Skeggs
- Manifest Destiny – Brian Garfield

Volume 191 – #4

- Cold Harbour – Jack Higgins
- Circle of Pearls – Rosalind Laker
- The Bear – James Oliver Curwood
- Finders Keepers – Barbara Nickolae

Volume 192 – #5

- Harvest – Belva Plain
- Purpose of Evasion – Greg Dinallo
- Snare of Serpents – Victoria Holt
- Coyote Waits – Tony Hillerman

=== 1991 ===
Volume 193 – #1

- Trial – Clifford Irving
- September – Rosamunde Pilcher
- The White Puma – R. D. Lawrence
- Mrs. Pollifax and the Whirling Dervish – Dorothy Gilman

Volume 194 – #2

- Longshot – Dick Francis
- The Women in His Life – Barbara Taylor Bradford
- Crackdown – Bernard Cornwell
- Something to Hide – Patricia Robinson

Volume 195 – #3

- The Firm – John Grisham
- Payment in Full – Henry Denker
- Final Approach – John J. Nance
- Home Ground – Hugh Miller

Volume 196 – #4

- As the Crow Flies – Jeffrey Archer
- Home Mountain – Jeanne Williams
- MacKinnon's Machine – S. K. Wolf
- Seal Morning – Rowena Farre

Volume 197 – #5

- The Eagle Has Flown – Jack Higgins
- Aspen Gold – Janet Dailey
- The Ice – Louis Charbonneau
- Lightning in July – Ann L. McLaughlin

Volume 198 – #6

- Loves Music, Loves to Dance – Mary Higgins Clark
- Lost and Found – Marilyn Harris
- Condition Black – Gerald Seymour
- Escape Into Light – Elizabeth Webster

=== 1992 ===
Volume 199 – #1

- Night Over Water – Ken Follett
- Doctor on Trial – Henry Denker
- Beast – Peter Benchley
- Dear Family – Camilla Bittle

Volume 200 – #2

- Comeback – Dick Francis
- Scarlett – Alexandra Ripley
- The Deceiver – Frederick Forsyth

Volume 201 – #3

- Acts of Faith – Erich Segal
- Hard Fall – Ridley Pearson
- Bygones – LaVyrle Spencer
- The Stormy Petrel – Mary Stewart

Volume 202 – #4

- Such Devoted Sisters – Eileen Goudge
- Rules of Encounter – William P. Kennedy
- The Love Child – Catherine Cookson
- American Gothic – Gene Smith

Volume 203 – #5

- The Pelican Brief – John Grisham
- Treasures – Belva Plain
- Eye of the Storm – Jack Higgins
- The Island Harp – Jeanne Williams

Volume 204 – #6

- Tangled Vines – Janet Dailey
- Stalk – Louis Charbonneau
- Anna – Cynthia Harrod-Eagles
- The Leading Lady – Betty White & Tom Sullivan

=== 1993 ===
Volume 205 – #1

- Every Living Thing – James Herriot
- All Around the Town – Mary Higgins Clark
- Colony – Anne Rivers Siddons
- Death Penalty – William J. Coughlin

Volume 206 – #2

- Driving Force – Dick Francis
- Sotah – Naomi Ragen
- The Doll's House – Evelyn Anthony
- The Bears and I – Robert Franklin Leslie

Volume 207 – #3

- Mrs. Washington and Horowitz, Too – Henry Denker
- Point of Impact – Stephen Hunter
- November of the Heart – LaVyrle Spencer
- Shooting Script – Gordon Cotler

Volume 208 – #4

- The Client – John Grisham
- Sweet Water – Christina Baker Kline
- Slow Through Eden – Gordon Glasco
- The Longest Road – Jeanne Williams

Volume 209 – #5

- Thunder Point – Jack Higgins
- The Venetian Mask – Rosalind Laker
- Final Argument – Clifford Irving
- Whispers – Belva Plain

Volume 210 – #6

- The Cat Who Went Into the Closet – Lillian Jackson Braun
- Homeland – John Jakes
- Tell Me No Secrets – Joy Fielding

=== 1994 ===
Volume 211 – #1

- I'll Be Seeing You – Mary Higgins Clark
- Honour Among Thieves – Jeffrey Archer
- Alex Haley's Queen – Alex Haley with David Stevens
- Mrs. Pollifax and the Second Thief – Dorothy Gilman

Volume 212 – #2

- Without Remorse – Tom Clancy
- The Old House at Railes – Mary Pearce
- Decider – Dick Francis
- King of the Hill – A. E. Hotchner

Volume 213 – #3

- A Dangerous Fortune – Ken Follett
- The Select – F. Paul Wilson
- Rivers of Gold – Janet Edmonds
- Hardscape – Justin Scott

Volume 214 – #4

- Fatal Cure – Robin Cook
- The Wrong House – Carol McD. Wallace
- Red Ink – Greg Dinallo
- Having Our Say – Sadie and Bessie Delany

Volume 215 – #5

- Daybreak – Belva Plain
- Disclosure – Michael Crichton
- St. Agnes' Stand – Tom Eidson
- The Fist of God – Frederick Forsyth

Volume 216 – #6

- Hidden Riches – Nora Roberts
- Phoenix Rising – John Nance
- Roommates – Max Apple
- White Harvest – Louis Charbonneau

=== 1995 ===
Volume 217 – #1

- The Chamber – John Grisham
- Remember Me – Mary Higgins Clark
- The Intruders – Stephen Coonts
- The Acorn Winter – Elizabeth Webster

Volume 218 – #2

- Tiger's Child – Torey Hayden
- Heat – Stuart Woods
- This Child is Mine – Henry Denker
- Wall of Brass – Robert Daley

Volume 219 – #3

- Prizes – Erich Segal
- Secret Missions – Michael Gannon
- Eyes of a Child – Richard North Patterson
- More Than Meets the Eye – Joan Brock & Derek Gill

Volume 220 – #4

- Acceptable Risk – Robin Cook
- Local Rules – Jay Brandon
- Salem Street – Anna Jacobs
- Fast Forward – Judy Mercer

Volume 221 – #5

- The Rainmaker – John Grisham
- The Carousel – Belva Plain
- Wedding Night – Gary Devon
- Cloud Shadows – Elizabeth Webster

Volume 222 – #6

- Let Me Call You Sweetheart – Mary Higgins Clark
- Children of the Dust – Clancy Carlile
- Mrs. Pollifax and the Lion-Killer – Dorothy Gilman
- The Magic Bullet – Harry Stein

=== 1996 ===
Volume 223 – #1

- A Place Called Freedom – Ken Follett
- The Horse Whisperer – Nicholas Evans
- The Apocalypse Watch – Robert Ludlum

Volume 224 – #2

- Come To Grief – Dick Francis
- Coming Home – Rosamunde Pilcher
- Blaze – Robert Somerlott
- That Camden Summer – LaVyrle Spencer

Volume 225 – #3

- The Final Judgment – Richard North Patterson
- Nathan's Run – John Gilstrap
- Dance of the Scarecrows – Ray Sipherd
- Implant – F. Paul Wilson

Volume 226 – #4

- Notorious – Janet Dailey
- Snow Wolf – Glenn Meade
- The Cat Who Said Cheese – Lilian Jackson Braun
- Mirage – Soheir Khashoggi

Volume 227 – #5

- The Zero Hour – Joseph Finder
- Rose – Martin Cruz Smith
- A Place For Kathy – Henry Denker
- The Judge – Steve Martini

Volume 228 – #6

- Moonlight Becomes You – Mary Higgins Clark
- The Outsider – Penelope Williamson
- Harvest – Tess Gerritsen
- The Falconer – Elaine Clark McCarthy

=== 1997 ===
Volume 229 – #1

- The Runaway Jury – John Grisham
- Critical Judgment – Michael Palmer
- Icon – Frederick Forsyth
- Capitol Offense – Senator Barbara Mikulski & Mary Louise Oates

Volume 230 – #2

- The Third Twin – Ken Follett
- Small Town Girl – LaVyrle Spencer
- To the Hilt – Dick Francis
- The Burning Man – Phillip Margolin

Volume 231 – #3

- A Woman's Place – Barbara Delinsky
- The Unlikely Spy – Daniel Silva
- The Cat Who Tailed a Thief – Lilian Jackson Braun
- Beyond Recognition – Ridley Pearson

Volume 232 – #4

- The Escape Artist – Diane Chamberlain
- Airframe – Michael Crichton
- Weeding Out the Tears – Jeanne White with Susan Dworkin
- Infinity's Child – Harry Stein

These 1997 volumes were also published as Reader's Digest Select Editions, and all succeeding volumes were published as Reader's Digest Select Editions.

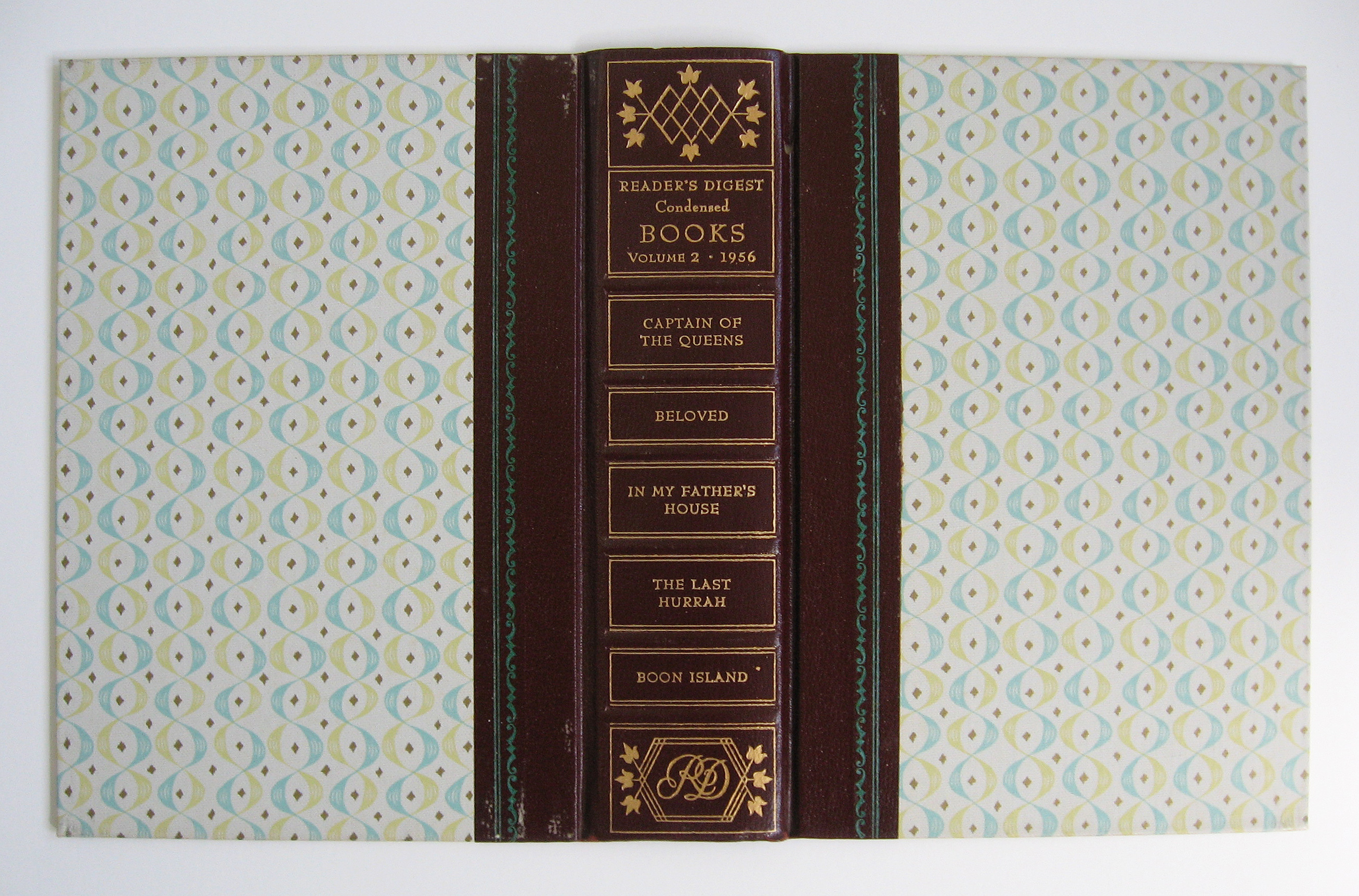

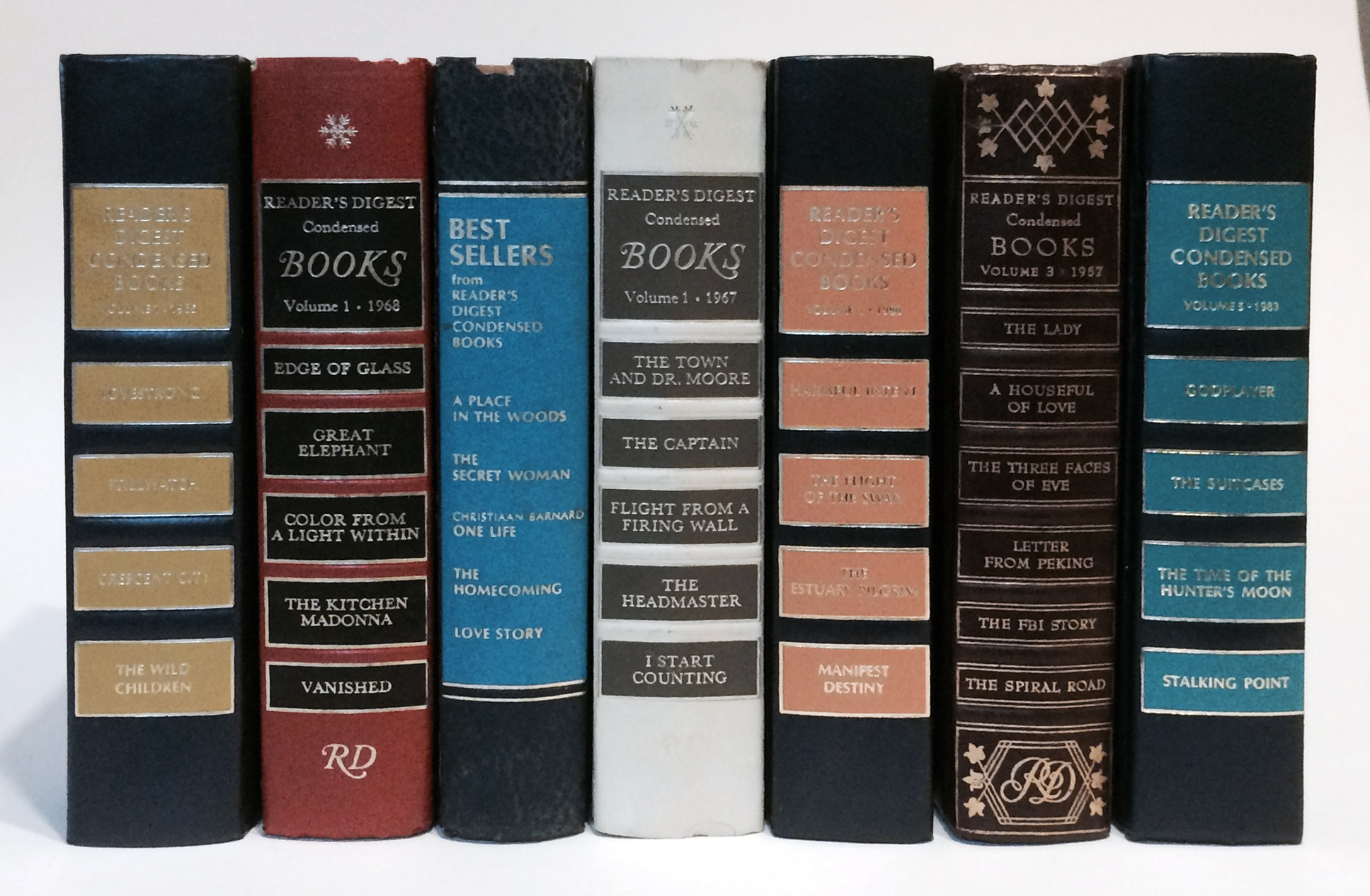

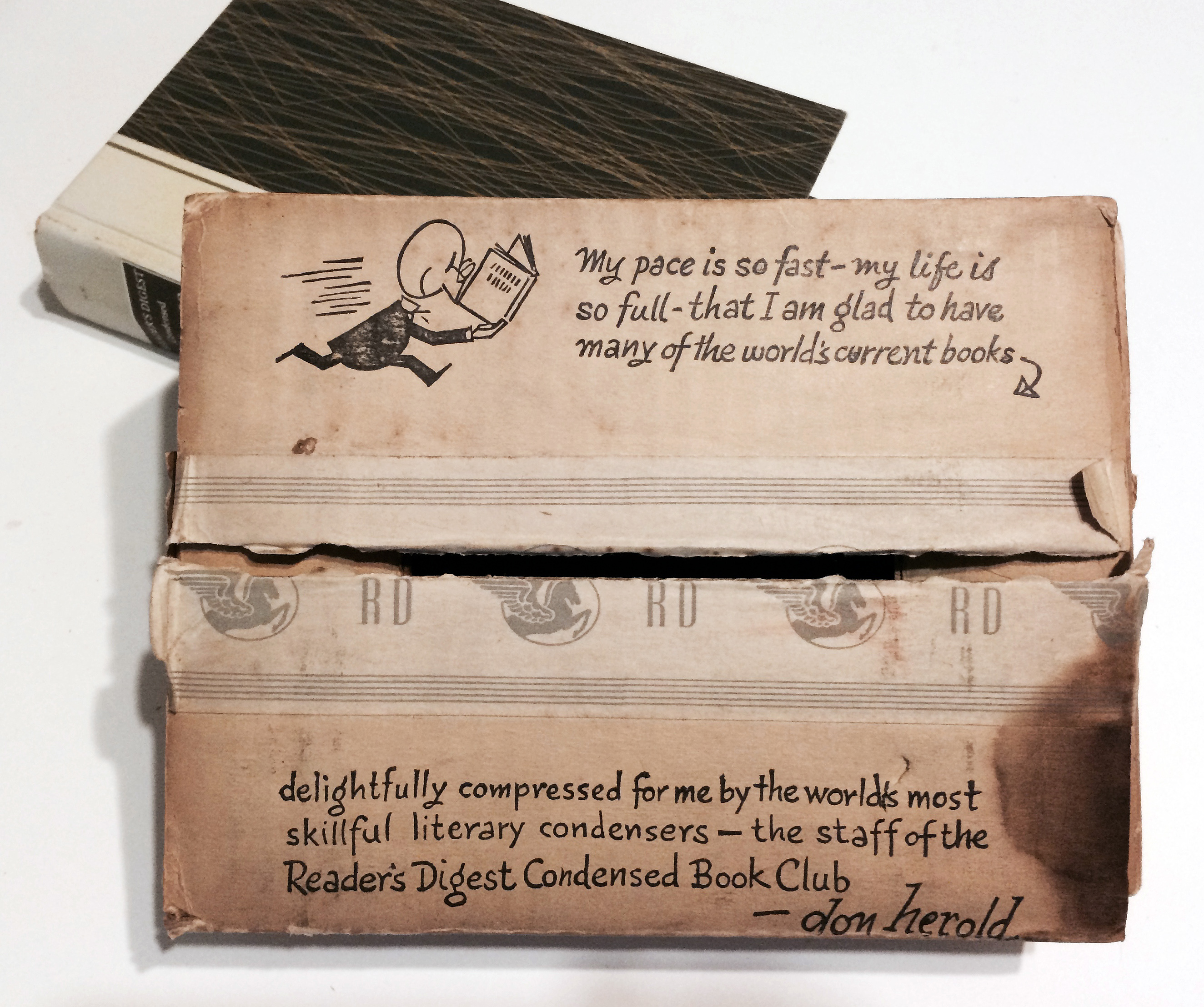

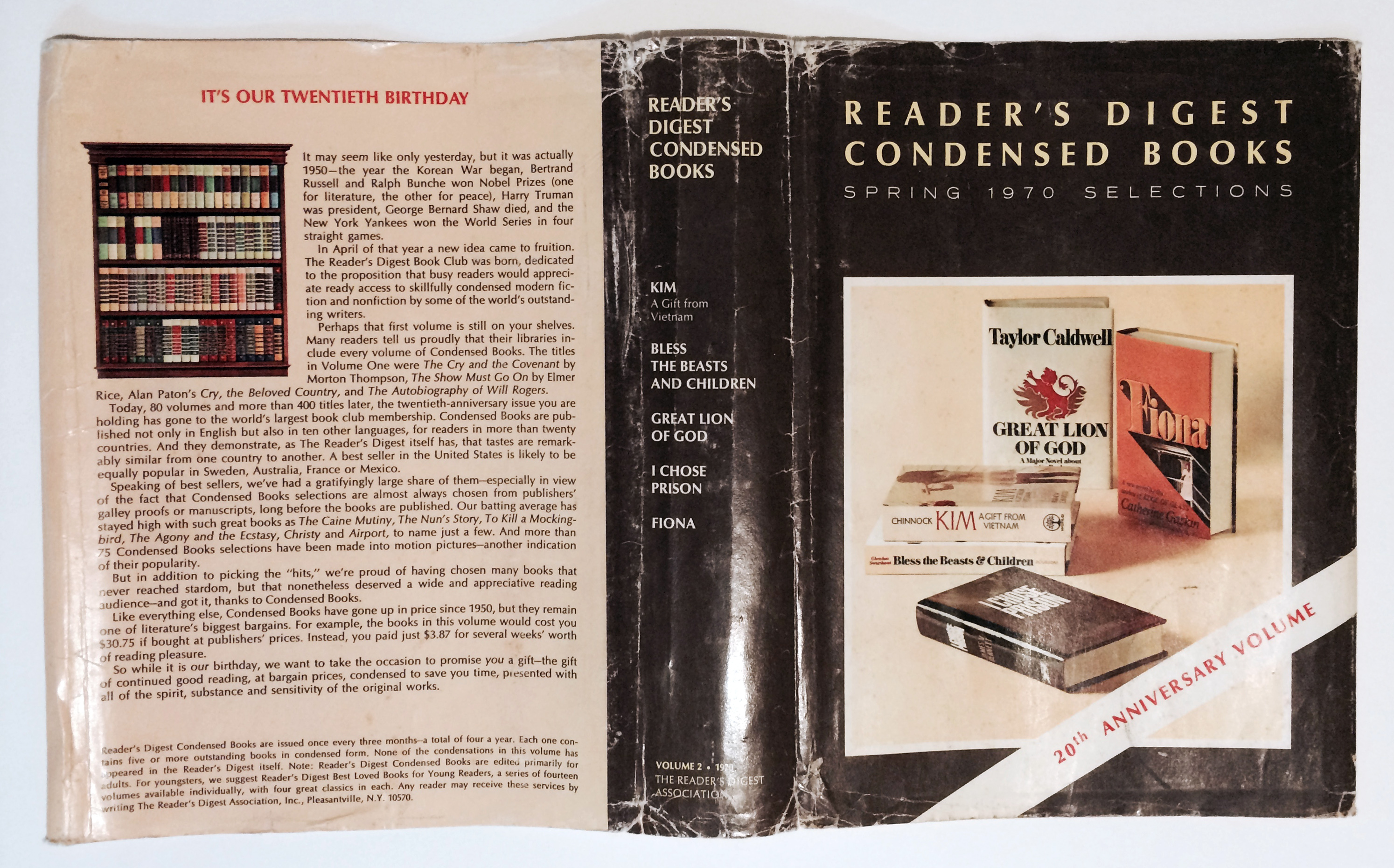
