= The Rainbow People =

(The) Rainbow People may refer to:

- The Rainbow People (book), a 1984 book by Richard Collier
- The Rainbow People (album), a 2002 album by Dexter Gordon and Benny Bailey
- Rainbow People (album), a 2008 album by Steve Turre
