= Cumhur =

Cumhur (pronounced [ˈdʒumhuɾ]) is a Turkish given name usually for males. People named Cumhur include:

- Cumhur Ersümer (born 1952), Turkish politician
- Cumhur Oranci (born 1960), Turkish writer
- Cumhur Yılmaztürk (born 1990), Turkish footballer
