= Robert Byrne (author) =

American novelist

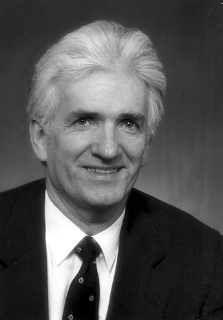
- Robert Byrne
- Born: May 22, 1930; Dubuque, Iowa, United States
- Died: December 6, 2016 (aged 86)
- Education: Bachelor of Science
- Alma mater: University of Colorado
- Occupation: Author
- Spouses: Josefa Heifetz (1958–1976; div.); Cynthia Nelms (1991–2016; his death)
- Writing career
- Language: English
- Period: 1969–2016
- Genres: Thriller, Collections of quotations, Billiards instruction
- Notable works: Memories of a Non-Jewish Childhood, 1970 Byrne's Standard Book of Pool & Billiards, 1978 Thrill, 1995
- Notable awards: BBIA Industry Service Award, 1994; BCA Hall of Fame (Meritorious Service), 2001
- Website: www.byrne.org

Robert Leo Byrne (/bɜːrn/; May 22, 1930 – December 6, 2016) was an American author and Billiard Congress of America Hall of Fame instructor of pool and carom billiards.

== Early life and education ==
Robert Leo Byrne, son of Tom and Clara (née Loes) Byrne, was born on May 22, 1930, and raised in Dubuque, Iowa. He attended St. Columbkille's elementary, Loras Academy, and Loras College.

He left Dubuque to attend Iowa State University, where his first sign of talent as a writer emerged as he edited a humor column in the school's newspaper. He transferred to University of Colorado, where he edited Flatiron, the school's humor publication, and he graduated in 1954 with a degree in civil engineering.

Byrne began his career in 1954 as a Junior Civil Engineer for the City and County of San Francisco, Department of Engineering, Bureau of Public Works, Division of Highways.

== Writing career ==
In 1955, a year later, he found a way to combine his engineering and writing talents by joining Western Construction magazine as a reporter for the heavy construction industry. In 1961, he was named editor of the magazine, a position he held for over ten years.

Byrne became a full-time writer in 1977, after the publication of his third book. He authored seven novels, five collections of humorous quotations, seven books on billiards, two anthologies, and an exposé of frauds in the literary world. One of his novels, Thrill, was made into NBC's Monday Night Movie, which aired for the first time on May 20, 1996. Three of his novels were selections of Reader's Digest Condensed Books and published in over a dozen languages.

Byrne's Standard Book of Pool and Billiards, published in 1978 and expanded in 1998, has sold over 500,000 copies. It is one of the very few such works that includes diagrams that are mathematically and physically accurate, with lines plotting the path of the center of the balls; the lines, therefore, do not touch the cushions of the table. Byrne coined the pool jargon term "squirt" in this book, defining the deflection effect that sends the cue ball toward the right when struck with left sidespin, and vice versa.

Byrne's books, hundreds of instructional magazine articles, and seven instructional videos (shot on sound stages in Burbank and Hollywood, California), established him as the pre-eminent teacher and commentator in the world of pool and billiards. He was a columnist and Contributing Editor for Billiard Digest magazine from its first issue in 1978, and a columnist for Dubuque's Telegraph Herald beginning in 2000. His most recent publication is Behold My Shorts, the collection of a decade of his monthly newspaper columns.

In 1994, on Hilton Head Island, South Carolina, he received the Industry Service Award from the Billiard and Bowling Institute of America, an honor previously bestowed on Willie Mosconi, Paul Newman, and Jackie Gleason. In 1998, the readers of Billiards Digest named Byrne "Best Billiards Writer". His contributions to billiards and pool were recognized with induction into the Billiard Congress of America's Hall of Fame. The honor, perhaps the greatest in the field, was bestowed for Meritorious Service on July 21, 2001, at the Las Vegas Hilton, at a banquet closing the annual International Billiard & Home Recreation Expo. He was inducted with many-time World Three-cushion Billiards Champion Raymond Ceulemans of Belgium.

As of May 2011, he had nearly finished a new collection of humorous quotations.

== Playing career ==
Byrne's first success as a pool hustler came at the age of 12 when he beat the gas-meter reader out of 85¢, playing 8-ball on his family's basement pool table.

As a player, he had success at U.S. national-class tournaments in multiple disciplines:

- Champion, National Senior Billiard Tournament, 1999
- Champion, National Amateur Athletic Club Billiards Tournament, 1999
- Third place, National Professional Three-Cushion Championship, 1977
- Fourth place, National Professional Three-Cushion Championship, 1968

== Personal life ==
On May 12, 1958, Byrne married Josefa Heifetz, concert pianist and daughter of legendary violinist Jascha Heifetz. Byrne and Heifetz were divorced in 1976.

He died on December 6, 2016.

== Works ==
=== Pool and billiards books ===
- McGoorty, The Story of a Billiard Bum, 1972, Lyle Stuart (hardcover, ISBN 978-0-8184-0056-8); republished 1984, as McGoorty, A Billiard Hustler's Life, Citadel Press, (hardcover, ISBN 978-0-8065-0925-9); republished again 2004, as McGoorty, A Pool Room Hustler, Broadway Books (paperback, ISBN 978-0-7679-1631-8)
- Byrne's Standard Book of Pool and Billiards, 1978, Harcourt Brace & Jovanovich (hardcover, ISBN 978-0-15-614972-3), 1987 (paperback, ISBN 978-0-15-614972-3)
- Byrne's Treasury of Trick Shots in Pool and Billiards, 1982, Harcourt Brace/Harvest (paperback, ISBN 978-0-15-614973-0); 1983, Mariner (paperback, ISBN 978-0-15-115224-7); 1984, Houghton Mifflin Harcourt Press (hardcover, ISBN 978-0-15-115224-7)
- Byrne's Advanced Technique in Pool and Billiards, 1990, Houghton Mifflin Harcourt Press (hardcover, ISBN 978-0-15-614971-6), Harcourt Brace (paperback, ISBN 978-0-15-614971-6)
- Byrne's Book of Great Pool Stories, 1995, Harcourt Brace (ISBN 978-0-15-600223-3)
- Byrne's Wonderful World of Pool and Billiards, 1996, Harcourt Brace (ISBN 978-0-15-600222-6)
- Byrne's New Standard Book of Pool and Billiards, 1998, Harcourt Brace (ISBN 978-0-15-600554-8)
- Byrne's Complete Book of Pool Shots: 350 Moves Every Player Should Know, 2003, Harcourt/Harvest Books (ISBN 978-0-15-602721-2)

=== Instructional videos ===
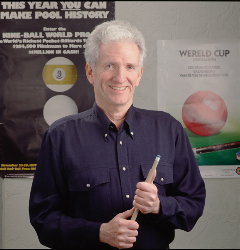

- Byrne's Standard Video of Pool, Volume I, 1987, Premiere Home Video
- Byrne's Standard Video of Pool, Volume II, 1988, Premiere Home Video
- Byrne's Standard Video of Trick Shots, Volume III, 1993, Premiere Home Video
- Byrne's Standard Video of More Trick Shots, Volume IV, 1993, Premiere Home Video
- Byrne's Power Pool Workout, Volume V, 1996, Premiere Home Video
- Byrne's Rack 'Em Up!, 1996, Premiere Home Video
- Byrne's Gamebreakers, 2002, Accu-Stats Video Productions

=== Billiard tournament commentary videos ===
- The Best of Three Cushion Billiards, Volume I, 1995, Accu-Stats Video Productions
- The Best of Three Cushion Billiards, Volume II, 1997, Accu-Stats Video Productions

=== Novels ===
- Memories of a Non-Jewish Childhood, 1970, Lyle Stuart (hardcover, ISBN 978-0-8184-0112-1); 1972, New American Library (paperback, ISBN 978-0-8184-0112-1) Staged as a musical by Dubuque's Grand Opera House in 2005.
- Once a Catholic, 1981m New American Library (paperback, ISBN 978-0-523-41165-1)
- The Tunnel, 1977, Harcourt Brace & Jovanovich (ISBN 978-0-15-191385-5).
- The Dam, 1981, Atheneum (ISBN 978-0-425-05385-0). Part of Reader's Digest Condensed Books #136, 1981, vol. 3
- Always a Catholic, 1981, Pinnacle (ISBN 978-0-523-42035-6)
- Skyscraper, 1984, Atheneum (ISBN 978-0-451-13557-5). Part of Reader's Digest Condensed Books #154, 1984, vol. 3
- Mannequin, 1988, Atheneum (ISBN 978-0-7089-2308-5). Included under the title Death Train in Reader's Digest Condensed Books #180, 1988, vol. 5
- Thrill, 1995, Carrol & Graf (ISBN 978-0-7867-0199-5)

=== Collections of quotations ===
- The 637 Best Things Anybody Ever Said, 1983, Fawcett (ISBN 978-0-449-20375-0)
- The Other 637 Best Things Anybody Ever Said, 1985, Fawcett (ISBN 978-0-449-20762-8)
- The Third and Possibly the Best, 637 Best Things Anybody Ever Said, 1986, Ballantine Books (ISBN 978-0-449-21337-7)
- The 1911 Best Things Anybody Ever Said, 1988, Fawcett/Columbine (ISBN 978-0-449-90285-1). Collection of the first three volumes.
- The Fourth and by Far the Most Recent 637 Best Things Anybody Ever Said, 1990, Fawcett (ISBN 978-0-449-21975-1)
- The Fifth and Far Finer than the First Four 637 Best Things Anybody Ever Said, 1994, Crest (ISBN 978-0-449-22312-3)
- The 2548 Best Things Anybody Ever Said, 1996, Budget Book Service (ISBN 978-0-88365-960-1); 2001, Galahad (hardcover, ISBN 978-0-88365-960-1); 2002, Fireside (paperback, ISBN 978-0-7432-3579-2); 2006, Simon & Schuster (hardcover, ISBN 978-1-4165-4035-9). Collection of the first four volumes.

=== Other books ===
- Writing Rackets, 1969, Lyle Stuart (ISBN 978-0-8184-0095-7)
- Cat Scan: All the Best from the Literature of Cats, 1983, Scribner (ISBN 978-0-689-11390-1)
- Every Day is Father's Day, 1990, Crest (ISBN 978-0-449-21822-8)
- Behold My Shorts, 2009, Telegraph Herald (ISBN 978-0-9819806-2-1)

=== As editor ===
- Heifetz-Byrne, Josefa. Mrs. Byrne's Dictionary of Unusual, Obscure, and Preposterous Words, Gathered from Many and Diverse Authoritative Sources, 1974, University Press (ISBN 978-0-586-20600-3)
- Kruse, Len. My Old Dubuque: Collected Writings on Dubuque Area History, 2000, Loras College Center for Dubuque History (ISBN 978-0-936875-07-1)
