= A Time for Miracles =

- A screen capture of the opening credits
- Genre: Biography; Drama
- Written by: Henry Denker
- Directed by: Michael O'Herlihy
- Starring: Kate Mulgrew; Lorne Greene; John Forsythe; Rossano Brazzi
- Theme music composer: Fred Karlin
- Country of origin: United States
- Original language: English

Production
- Producers: Beverlee Dean; Jimmy Hawkins
- Cinematography: Donald H. Birnkrant (as Don Birnkrant)
- Editor: Paul LaMastra
- Running time: 97 min.
- Production companies: ABC Circle Films; The Jimmy Hawkins Company

Original release
- Network: ABC
- Release: December 21, 1980

A Time For Miracles is a 1980 American made-for-television biographical drama film chronicling the life story of America's first native born saint, Elizabeth Ann Bayley Seton. It was produced by ABC Circle Films for the American Broadcasting Company and telecast December 21, 1980, as a Christmas special. The film was created by Beverlee Dean and directed by Michael O'Herlihy. The script was written by Henry Denker with collaboration with Sister Mary Hilaire and filmed in Georgia. A Time For Miracles starred Ryan's Hope and Star Trek: Voyager actress Kate Mulgrew as Elizabeth Seton. John Forsythe and Lorne Greene also star.

== Plot ==
Elizabeth Bayley Seton (1774-1821) is a happily married New York Episcopalian socialite and mother of five whose life gets turned around after her husband, William Seton, dies of consumption in Italy after his shipping business went bankrupt. As a widow with five children, she opens a small school in an effort to support herself and family.

She decides to convert to Catholicism, much to the protest and distaste of her friends and family. As a social outcast, she is left with nothing so she and her daughters took refuge in Baltimore. Under the wing of John Carroll, the first American Catholic bishop, she opens a school, establishes a religious routine and takes religious vows, thus becoming `Mother Seton.' Eventually she, her daughter, and a band of young women who have joined her rattle west in a covered wagon into the countryside, to Emmitsburg, Maryland., where, on an initial diet of salt pork and carrot coffee, she sets up a school and a convent for her growing sisterhood, Sisters of Charity. She dies from consumption at 46. The Roman Catholic Church requires 2 attested miracles to become a saint and 3 were attributed to Mother Seton. Mother Seton was canonized in 1975.

== Cast ==
- Kate Mulgrew .... Mother Elizabeth Bayley Seton
- Jean-Pierre Aumont .... Father DuBois
- Rossano Brazzi .... Fillipo Fillici
- John Forsythe .... Postulator
- Lorne Greene .... Bishop John Carroll
- Jean LeClerc .... Father Brute
- Leonard Mann .... Antonio Fillici
- Robin Clarke .... William Seton
- William Prince .... Prefect
- Dominic Chianese .... Promoter
- Timothy Patrick Murphy .... Will
- Hoolihand Burke .... Maria
- Sherrie Wills .... Veronica
- Everett McGill .... The Farmer
- Fred Rolf .... Goldsmith
- Leonardo Cimino .... Italian Priest
- Chiara Peacock .... Anna
- Nan Mason .... Rose White
- Penelope Allen .... The Farmer's Wife
- Ellen Barber .... Amabilia Filicchi
- Roy Cooper .... O'Connoway
- George Murdock
- Milo O'Shea
- Michael Higgins
- Diane Kagan
- Danny Moran
- Jon Adams
- Doug Johnson
- Sharon Foote
- Erica Katz
- Amy Linker
- Todd Fine
- Travis Fine
- Don Devendorf .... Ship Owner (uncredited)
