= Cumhur Oranci =

Turkish writer and literary translator (1960–2025)

Rüştü Cumhur Orancı
- Born: October 28, 1960; Istanbul, Turkey
- Died: November 21, 2025 (aged 65); Istanbul, Turkey
- Occupations: Writer, Translator
- Writing career
- Language: Turkish
- Genres: Magical realism, Urban fantasy
- Notable works: Butterfly’in İntihar Seferi; Saydam

Rüştü Cumhur Orancı (October 28, 1960 – November 21, 2025) was a Turkish writer and literary translator. Known for his contributions to magical realism and urban fantasy in Turkish literature, Orancı worked as a radio operator on merchant vessels for many years before establishing himself as a novelist.

== Biography ==
Orancı was born in Istanbul in 1960. He left Turkey prior to the coup d'état of September 12, 1980 and spent time in Europe, where he worked as a journalist. Later, he became a radio operator on merchant vessels, a profession that allowed him to travel the world extensively. These maritime experiences deeply influenced his literary work.

Orancı died in Istanbul on November 21, 2025.

== Literary career ==
Orancı published his first novel, Butterfly’in İntihar Seferi (The Suicide Voyage of the Butterfly), in 1991. Written in a magical realist style, the book is a fictionalized account based on his years working at sea.

His second novel, Domingo Garcia'dan Geriye Kalan Öykü (The Story Left Behind by Domingo Garcia), was published in 1995. This was followed in 1996 by Saydam (Translucent), which is considered the first example of the urban fantasy genre in Turkish literature.

After a long hiatus from publishing fiction, Orancı returned with Acı Düşler Bulvarı (Boulevard of Bitter Dreams) in July 2012. The novel was released as part of the "Underground Series" by Ayrıntı Publications.

In addition to his novels, Orancı was a prolific translator, translating works by authors such as David Almond, Glenn Meade, Elmore Leonard, and Kate Braverman into Turkish.

== Bibliography ==
=== Novels ===
- Butterfly’in İntihar Seferi (1991, Telos)
- Domingo Garcia'dan Geriye Kalan Öykü (1995, Telos)
- Saydam (1996, Telos)
- Acı Düşler Bulvarı (2012, Ayrıntı Yayınları)

=== Selected Translations ===
Orancı translated numerous books into Turkish, including:

- Stories and Poems Greeting Human Rights (Turkish title: İnsan Hakları'nı Selamlayan Öyküler ve Şiirler Özgürlük), Hayykitap, 2010.
- Turkish Shadow Play Karagöz by Ünver Oral, Ministry of Culture and Tourism, 2009.
- Turkish Cuisine, edited by Arif Bilgin and Özge Samanci, Ministry of Culture and Tourism, 2008.
- Diabetes Cookbook For Dummies (Turkish title: Diyabet Yemekleri For Dummies), Doğan Kitap, 2008.
- The Devil's Disciple by Glenn Meade (Turkish title: Şeytanın Müridi), Doğan Kitap, 2007.
- Killshot by Elmore Leonard (Turkish title: Ölüm Vuruşu), Doğan Kitap, 2007.
- Mothers and Other Monsters by Maureen F. McHugh (Turkish title: Anneler ve Öteki Canavarlar), İstiklal Kitabevi, 2007.
- The Boy by Julian Davies (Turkish title: Delikanlı), İstiklal Kitabevi, 2006.
- The Library by Zoran Živković (Turkish title: Başka Zaman Kütüphaneleri), İstiklal Kitabevi, 2006.
- Lithium for Medea (published as Bulut Kız) by Kate Braverman, İstiklal Kitabevi, 2006.
- Women Who Think Too Much by Susan Nolen-Hoeksema, Dharma Yayınları, 2006.
- Olympiad by Tom Holt, Literatür Yayıncılık, 2004.
- The Moments of Grace by Neale Donald Walsch, Dharma Yayınları, 2004.
- Gridiron by Philip Kerr, Telos Yayıncılık, 1998.
