= Marjorie Hamilton =

33rd Mayor of Barrie
- In office 1950–1952
- Preceded by: Edwin Wilson
- Succeeded by: James W. Hart

Personal details
- Born: 1898
- Died: December 27, 1990 (aged 91–92)
- Spouse: John Mercer Hamilton

Marjorie May Hamilton (1898 – December 27, 1990) was a Canadian politician, who served as mayor of Barrie, Ontario from 1950 to 1952. She was the first woman ever to serve as Barrie's mayor, and one of the earliest women elected as a mayor in all of Ontario.

A grandmother and widow, Hamilton served for three years as an alderman on the town council and was active in the local chapter of the Progressive Conservative Party of Canada before being elected mayor in the 1950 municipal election. Early in her term, Hamilton presided over a municipal celebration and parade after the Barrie Flyers won the 1951 Memorial Cup.

She also served on the board of the Association of Ontario Mayors and Reeves and the Ontario Hydro Advisory Council.

During the 1952 municipal election, Hamilton became engaged in a public dispute with city clerk and treasurer L. R. Barrand, who tendered his resignation from the city after opposing her plan to separate his position into two distinct job titles to be held by two different people. Council refused to accept Barrand's resignation, or Hamilton's plan. The dispute led councillor James W. Hart to register in the mayoral election against Hamilton, who until that point had been running unopposed. Hart defeated Hamilton in the election.

Hamilton was later appointed as head of Simcoe County's juvenile and family courts. She had not previously worked as a lawyer, but was chosen for the position because of her past work in public service and social welfare. At a provincial conference of the Association of Juvenile and Family Court Judges of Ontario in 1965, she stated in a speech that having been mothers of children gave women a unique advantage in family and juvenile judgeships.

She died on December 27, 1990, at the Riverdale Hospital in Toronto.

== Works ==
- Pirates and Pathfinders, authored text of elementary school textbook
