= Henry Denker =

American dramatist (1912–2012)

- Born: November 25, 1912; New York, U.S.
- Died: May 15, 2012 (aged 99)
- Education: New York Law School
- Occupations: Novelist; playwright
- Spouse: Edith Heckman

Henry Denker (November 25, 1912 – May 15, 2012) was an American novelist, playwright, and screenwriter. He began his career as a radio and television writer, and is credited as the originator and writer of what he described as the first television series ever produced, False Witness, broadcast on NBC-TV in 1939. He wrote the first script for the religious radio series The Greatest Story Ever Told, which won a special George Foster Peabody Citation in 1949. Of his 34 published novels, 17 were selected and published by Reader's Digest Condensed Books. Six of his plays were produced on Broadway. Trained as a lawyer, Denker drew on his legal background throughout his prolific writing career across radio, television, theater, and fiction.

== Biography ==
Denker was born in New York, the son of a fur trader. After initially studying to be a rabbi, he changed to the study of law and graduated from New York Law School in 1934. He stopped practicing law but used his legal background for numerous written works.

Denker was admitted to the New York Bar in 1935, at the height of the Depression. He worked for an attorney who specialized in matters related to the theater, such as incorporating shows and drawing up contracts. When a day's work ended, Denker stayed at the office and wrote on the office typewriter. He soon left law practice to earn his living by writing. His legal training was reflected in many of his works. During Denker's brief legal career, he won a Workmen's Compensation case which, according to Denker, for the first time established that a physical trauma can induce a mental disease. In another case, Denker served a summons on heavyweight champion Jack Johnson.

Denker was the originator and writer of what he describes as the "first television series ever produced," False Witness, on NBC-TV in 1939. Despite its success, the series was discontinued when the nascent medium of television was converted into an instruction tool for the mass training of Air Raid Wardens in anticipation of the U.S. entry into World War II.

Denker started writing for radio with three productions on CBS Radio's Columbia Workshop: "Me? I Drive a Hack," starring Richard Widmark, "Emile, the Seal," a fantasy, and "Laughter for the Leader," a political drama in which CBS, without explanation, forbade the character of Hitler to be played with a German accent. During World War II, Denker worked as a writer on the English Desk of the Office of War Information.

In 1945, Denker began his full-time writing career as the writer of the Radio Reader's Digest on CBS. One of his scripts, he says, was the first radio drama about a physical transplant, a corneal transplant of a human eye to restore sight.

In 1947, Denker wrote the first script for the religious radio series The Greatest Story Ever Told, which, in 1949, won a special George Foster Peabody Citation, the Christopher Award, the CCNY Outstanding Program of the Year Award, the Variety Award of the Year 1947, and others. Denker was to write every script in the series, which ran from 1947 to 1957.

Later, on television, Denker wrote, and David Susskind produced, the first dramatic treatment of a heart transplant, "The Choice," which anticipated the challenge of so many patients in need and so few hearts to give. With a cast including Melvyn Douglas, George Grizzard and Frank Langella, the TV drama included film of an actual surgery provided by Dr. Michael E. DeBakey. Denker recalls that CBS allowed only 30 seconds of the surgical film for fear that the audience would shrink from seeing a beating heart in an open chest cavity.

While writing for radio and television, Denker branched out into the theater, which he described as "my first love." Later he began writing novels. Of his 34 published novels, 17—more than any other author's—have been selected and published by Reader's Digest Condensed Books.

Six plays by Denker have been produced on Broadway, two in the Kennedy Center in Washington, D.C., and two in other venues.

Denker was married for 62 years to Edith Heckman, whom he met when he was a patient and she was a nurse in Mt. Sinai Hospital in New York City.

Denker died of lung cancer on May 15, 2012.

== In popular culture ==
Denker is mentioned in an exchange in Herman Raucher's novel There Should Have Been Castles when Helen McIninny says to writer Ben Webber, "You're no Henry Denker." When Webber professes ignorance of who Denker is, she replies, "Henry Denker is a writer whose pen you will never be able to lift, let alone carry."

== Partial bibliography ==
=== Novels ===
- I'll Be Right Home, Ma (1949)
- My Son, the Lawyer (1950)
- God's Selfless Men (1952)
- Salome, Princess of Galilee (1953)
- Time Limit! (1956)
- That First Easter (1959)
- Give us Barabbas (1961)
- The Director (1971)
- The Kingmaker (1972)
- A Place for the Mighty (1973)
- The Physicians (1975)
- The Experiment (1977)
- The Starmaker (1977)
- The Scofield Diagnosis (1977)
- The Actress (1978)
- Error of Judgement (1979)
- Horowitz and Mrs. Washington (1979)
- The Warfield Syndrome (1982)
- Outrage (1982) (about vigilantism)
- Healers (1983)
- Kincaid (1984)
- Kate Kincaid (1985)
- Robert, My Son (1985)
- Judge Spencer Dissents (1986)
- The Choice (1987)
- The Judgment (1988)
- The Retreat (1988) (about alcoholism)
- A Gift of Life (1989) (about a heart transplant)
- Payment in Full (1991)
- Doctor on Trial (1992)
- Mrs. Washington And Horowitz, Too (1993)
- Labyrinth (1994) (legal thriller about multiple personalities)
- This Child Is Mine (1995) (battle over custody of a child)
- To Marcy, with Love (1996)
- A Place for Kathy (1997) (about a 12-year-old girl whose mother is diagnosed with HIV)
- Clarence (2001) (told from the point of view of a Golden Retriever)
- Cla$$ Action (2005) (lawyers about to take over all other industries)

=== Plays ===
- A Case of Libel (based on the 1955 Reynolds v. Pegler libel case) (1963)
- A Far Country (1961) (about Sigmund Freud)
- Horowitz and Mrs. Washington (1980)
- The Second Time Around
- Something Old, Something New (1977)
- Time Limit! (written with Ralph Berkey) (1956)
- Venus at Large (1962)
- What Did We Do Wrong? (1967)
- The Wound Within (1958)

"The Headhunters" 1971

=== Screenplays ===
- Time Limit (1957)
- The Power of the Resurrection (1958)
- The Hook (1962)
- Twilight of Honor (1963) (courtroom drama)
- Neither Are We Enemies (1970)
- The Only Way Out Is Dead (1970)
- Judgement: The Court Martial of Lt. William Calley (courtroom drama) (Stanley Kramer, 1975)
- A Time for Miracles (1980) (about Elizabeth Bayley Seton)
