= The Greatest Story Ever Told (radio program) =

American old-time radio religious drama

- Genre: Religious drama
- Country of origin: United States
- Language: English
- Syndicates: ABC
- Starring: Warren Parker
- Announcer: Norman Rose
- Written by: Henry Denker
- Directed by: Marx Loeb
- Original release: January 26, 1947 – December 30, 1956
- Sponsored by: Goodyear Tire and Rubber Company

The Greatest Story Ever Told is an American old-time radio religious drama. It was broadcast on ABC from January 26, 1947, until December 30, 1956. Beginning July 25, 1948, the program was also broadcast via shortwave radio to 58 other countries by the World Wide Broadcasting Foundation.

The Greatest Story Ever Told, the title of which was used for Fulton Oursler's 1949 book, used dramatized sketches to depict events in the life of Jesus Christ. As in the book, the words spoken by Jesus in the radio program came directly from the Bible. The premiere episode was "Parable of the Good Samaritan".

The program was sponsored by Goodyear Tire and Rubber Company, but it lacked commercials, having the sponsorship announced only at the end of each episode. When the broadcast run ended, the affiliation between the program and Goodyear was described as "one of [the] longest institutional broadcast advertising campaigns".

An interdenominational advisory board provided guidance for the show.

== Personnel ==
Actors on The Greatest Story Ever Told performed in anonymity, with no cast credit given. Therefore, few people knew that Warren Parker portrayed Jesus in the program's only continuing role. Norman Rose was the announcer. William Stoess composed the music and initially conducted the 35-piece orchestra, with Jacques Belasco and Willard Young following him as conductors. Young also directed the show's 16-member chorus. Wadill Catchings was the producer; Marx Loeb was the director, and Leonard Blair was Loeb's assistant. With Oursler as consultant, Henry Denker wrote the scripts, which received "screenwriting credit over and above the Oursler book" for the film The Greatest Story Ever Told (1965).

== Recordings ==
In 1950, ABC produced more than 5,000 albums of recordings of selected episodes of The Greatest Story Ever Told, with half going to the Protestant Radio Commission and half to the National Council of Catholic Men. The Catholic group's albums were distributed to Catholic orphanages, hospitals, and schools. The Protestant group distributed its recording among ministerial groups and councils of churches.

== Recognition and critical reception ==
City College of New York honored The Greatest Story Ever Told as the best radio program created and broadcast in 1947. The recognition noted that the show presented its episodes "with superior good taste and effective listener appeal".

In 1949, The Greatest Story Ever Told won a special George Foster Peabody Citation. The citation noted, "... the program has maintained such a high degree of religious integrity, and has been so free of denominational bias or prejudice, that it has won the acclaim of newspapers, magazines, trade journals, and religious leaders alike. ... The Greatest Story Ever Told has occupied a peculiar niche, carved by both quality and popularity..." Also in 1949, the Freedoms Foundation named the show Best Radio Program.

On February 9, 1947, Jack Gould wrote in The New York Times, "The Greatest Story Ever Told is a program of extraordinary beauty and reverence, which without reservation may be listed as one of the most significant ethereal achievements in recent years." He went on to call the show "a rare and successful fusion of religion, art and commerce ..."

== Television ==
On December 2 and 23, 1951, ABC-TV broadcast episodes of The Greatest Story Ever Told. The first was "The Story of Lazarus", and the second was "No Room at the Inn".

In 1952, CBS obtained the rights to broadcast a televised version of The Greatest Story Ever Told, to be sponsored by Goodyear. An article in the trade publication Billboard reported that the half-hour program would be broadcast one Sunday afternoon in each of April, May and June 1952, and "it will be shown weekly next season". It never came to fruition.
