= The Director (Denker novel) =

1970 novel by Henry Denker

- Author: Henry Denker
- Publisher: Baron
- Publication date: May 21, 1970
- Pages: 493
- ISBN: 0-671-81359-5

The Director is a 1970 novel by American author Henry Denker. It was published by Richard W. Baron.

The novel is about an ambitious young film director, named Jock Finley, who uses two prominent film stars Carr and Daisy Donnel (ostensibly based on Clark Gable and Marilyn Monroe) to rebuild his already damaged career. The novel is laced with sharp dialogue and explicit sexual encounters in line with the counterculture of the 1970s. The Underlying theme of the novel is the clash of generations as of values.
