= Ann Cornelisen =

American author

- Born: November 12, 1926; Cleveland, Ohio
- Died: November 12, 2003 (aged 77); Rome, Georgia
- Occupation: writer

Ann Cornelisen (November 12, 1926 - November 12, 2003) was an American writer who lived and wrote in Italy.

== Early life and education ==
Cornelisen was born in Cleveland, Ohio to Ralph White and Ydoine (Rose) Cornelisen, and raised in Chicago. She attended Girl's Latin School in Chicago, Baldwin School at Bryn Mawr, and earned a degree from Vassar College.

== Career ==
After her marriage to Gordon O'Gara fell apart she moved to Italy in 1954 wanting to be an archeologist. She was married to Charles W. Cammack III in 1957.

She lived for two decades in the Abruzzi region where her status as a Protestant-American divorcee sometimes made her the subject of gossip. She wound up working as an aid worker, helping to establish 300 nurseries with the non-profit organization Save the Children, often in remote mountain villages. She wrote books about her experience that the New York Times called "sensitive, incisive and often humorous."

Her 1969 non-fiction book Torregreca (a pseudonym for the village of Tricarico) detailed the poverty and traditional ways she found in rural Italy and was compared to Let Us Now Praise Famous Men by Time. Cornelisen documented the lifestyles of the people who lived in remote villages where the church was the dominant social force and secondary education was nonexistent. She took photographs as well as reported on the conditions. The book was a selection for Reader's Digest Condensed Books in 1969 and was reprinted in 2002.

One of her other books is Women of the Shadows, published in 1976. It documents the lives of four women in the Basilicata region of Southern Italy. As their husbands were forced to leave their homes to find work in Northern Italy or Germany, the women were left to cope with the hardships of daily life on their own. Cornelisen's account is unique for its use of her own original photographs, which she included in the book to illustrate the lives of the women she profiled. The book offers an intimate look at the challenges faced by women in Italy's Mezzogiorno, and the resilience they showed in the face of adversity. She was awarded a Guggenheim Fellowship for her work in 1977.

== Death and legacy ==
Cornelisen died in Rome, Georgia in 2003. Her work as an aid worker was the inspiration for the American charity worker character in Juliet Grames' novel The Lost Boy of Santa Chionia. After her death Vassar established the Ann Cornelisen Fellowship for Post-Graduate Language Study and the Ann Cornelisen Fellowship for Summer Language Study for Undergraduate Students. Her papers are held by the Vassar College Libraries.

== Bibliography ==
- Torregreca: Life, Death, Miracles (1969)
- Vendetta of Silence (1971)
- Women of the Shadows: Wives and Mothers of Southern Italy (1976)
- Strangers and Pilgrims: The Last Italian Migration (1980)
- Any Four Women Could Rob the Bank of Italy (1983)
- Where It All Began: Italy, 1954 (1990).
