= Jetta Carleton =

American novelist (1913–1999)

Jetta Carleton (October 18, 1913 – December 28, 1999) was an American novelist. Her novel The Moonflower Vine was a bestseller in 1962.

== Biography ==
Carleton was born on a farm in Nevada, Missouri, the daughter of P. A. Carleton, the local superintendent of schools. She had two sisters, Truma and Yana; both were schoolteachers, and over twenty years older than she. The house in which they lived lacked indoor plumbing when she was born. Carleton attended Cottey College in Nevada, from which she graduated in 1933. She went on to study English and take a master's degree at the University of Missouri from which she graduated in 1939. While there, she danced and acted in student productions, and in 1936 she was named the school's Poet of the Year.

Upon graduation from the university, Carleton moved to Joplin, where she taught at Joplin Junior College. After a short time there she moved again, to Kansas City, where she took a job at WHB writing advertising copy; eventually she was given her own program on the station about local events. While living there she met Jene Lyon, marrying him in 1943. They soon moved to New York City, where Carleton found work as an advertising copywriter, among a variety of other odd jobs. The couple purchased a house in Hoboken, New Jersey, but returned to Nevada for a visit for two weeks every summer. It was these visits which provided the inspiration for the novel The Moonflower Vine, much of which is based on stories from Carleton's family and other residents of the town.

The Moonflower Vine was published by Alfred A. Knopf in 1962, and proved to be a sensation. It was edited by Robert Gottlieb, who said of it, "Of the hundreds upon hundreds of novels I've edited, this is literally the only one I've reread several times since its publication." The novel spent four months on the New York Times bestseller list; it was selected for promotion by two major book clubs, appeared as a Reader's Digest Condensed Book, and was published in eight other countries. Due to its success, Cottey presented Carleton with its Distinguished Alumna Award in 1964. Nevertheless, it remained the only novel which she published during her lifetime.

Carleton and her husband moved to Santa Fe, New Mexico, in 1970, and opened a publishing house, The Lightning Tree, with the money earned from her novel. Although never profitable, it published poetry, cookbooks, and works on regional history, and kept her too busy to write. During this time she continued with her tradition of visiting family in Nevada every summer. The press folded in 1991, two years before Lyon died. Carleton began work on another novel, The Back Alleys of Spring, based on her experiences teaching in Joplin. She had nearly finished it in 1997, and was preparing to shop it around for publication when she suffered a stroke and hit her head on a stone floor at her house; she was not found for some hours, and ultimately was robbed of her ability to speak. At her death in 1999 her papers went to a nephew in Missouri; the novel was thought lost in a May 2003 tornado, but it had instead been preserved by her literary executor, Larry Calloway, in Santa Fe.

The Moonflower Vine fell into obscurity after its initial bout of success. Eventually it was featured on The Neglected Books Page, which provided it with renewed attention. As a result, the novel was republished by Harper Perennial in April 2009, with an introduction by Missouri writer Jane Smiley, an avowed fan of the work. The Back Alleys of Spring was eventually published by the same publisher in 2012, under the title Clair de Lune.
