= The Neglected Books Page =

Book review website

The Neglected Books Page is a book review website. The site features reviews of books that have been, according to the site, "neglected, overlooked, forgotten, or stranded by changing tides in critical or popular taste." The site was founded in 2006.

== Background ==
Brad Bigelow is the author of the website, he reportedly has had a lifelong interest in finding and reading neglected books, typically by browsing used books stores. He says he was inspired by David Madden's book Rediscoveries (1971), a collection of essays by a variety of writers about little-known or long-forgotten books. Bigelow said it provided the model for how to write about forgotten books. Bigelow is unnamed on the website, only as "Editor", he says he does not seek publicity or fame, rather he sees the project as a hobby like stamp collecting. Bigelow worked for the U.S. Air Force for 25 years; at the time the site started in 2006, he was an IT project manager for NATO.

Some of the books rediscovered include The Moonflower Vine (1962) a novel by Jetta Carleton, a discovery noted by Publishers Weekly. Neglected Books had featured the book in December 2006, including an endorsement from author Jane Smiley. Literary agent Denise Shannon read Neglected Books and from that ordered a used copy of Moonflower which she read and loved. From there she sold the idea to Harper Perennial to republish.

Author Jack Gantos said in The New York Times that "My favorite Web site is The Neglected Books Page. Every time I go on it, there is always a title I walk away with that I track down, and it's drop-dead great."

In March 2016, Bigelow and the website were featured in a New Yorker article titled "The Custodian of Forgotten Books".

In July 2021, the University of East Anglia's UEA Publishing Project announced its series 'Recovered Books', inspired by the blog, and with Bigelow as series editor. The first two titles are Gentleman Overboard by Herbert Clyde Lewis and What Katy Did by Sarah Chauncey Woolsey.
