= Pirates and Pathfinders =

Canadian elementary school textbook

Pirates and Pathfinders is a Canadian elementary school textbook, originally published in 1947 (revised in 1963) by Clarke, Irwin, & Company. Marjorie Hamilton wrote the text; Lloyd Scott illustrated it. A revised French language edition was printed by Clarke, Irwin in 1955; the French title was La découverte du monde ("The Discovery of the World"); the text was translated by Louis Charbonneau.

== Content ==
The book was a history textbook, intended for "the intermediate grades of the elementary schools". The book focused on the history of European discovery and colonization of the rest of the world, with a particular focus on the achievements of the British Empire. The book was divided into seven chapters:

- "The Road to Cathay", chiefly about Marco Polo;
- "To the New World", chiefly about Christopher Columbus
- "Around the World", chiefly about Vasco da Gama, Ferdinand Magellan, and Sir Francis Drake;
- "Discoveries in the South Seas", chiefly about Captain James Cook;
- "Light on the Dark Continent", chiefly about David Livingstone and Henry Morton Stanley;
- "The Search for the North-West Passage", chiefly about Sir John Franklin; and
- "To the Ends of the Earth," which focused on Arctic and Antarctic exploration, and the mountain climbing exploits of Sir Edmund Hillary.

The book was also well furnished with maps, including a series in which areas of the world were progressively revealed from being obscured with brown ink, showing the different areas of the world that Europeans had explored. The areas that Europeans had explored were called the "known world".

== Reception ==
The book was quite popular in elementary education in Canada. Over 50,000 copies of the text were purchased for Ontario schools in 1960. It remained in print until 1972.

The heroic narratives presented by it, coupled with its copious and dramatic illustrations, have made the book a vivid memory for some Canadians who attended English speaking elementary schools during the period in which it was in use. However, the text has been sharply criticized in more recent years. The Royal Commission on Bilingualism and Biculturalism chose this textbook by name as a bad example, observing its Anglocentric bias; the commission's reviewers found that the book "devotes 60 per cent of its text to the achievements of British explorers alone and completely ignores the French."
