= Emma Drummond =

British writer (1931–2020)

Edna May Dawes (1931 – 20 November 2020) was a British author, who wrote under the pen names Emma Drummond, Eva Dane, and Elizabeth Darrell.

== Life and career ==
Drummond was born at a military hospital, as her father was a member of the British Army. She spent her early childhood in Hong Kong, where her father was stationed. Drummond eventually married a senior British civil servant. Her employment was as a WRAC (Women's Royal Army Corps).

She lived in Sopley, Hampshire. Drummond was diagnosed with bowel cancer in February 2020, and died at her home in Sopley, on 20 November 2020, aged 89.

== Bibliography ==
- At the Going Down of the Sun
- And in the Morning
- We Will Remember
- Scarlet Shadows
- The Burning Land
- The Rice Dragon
- Beyond All frontiers
- Forget The Glory
- Some Far Elusive Dawn
- That Sweet and Savage Land
- A Question of Honour
- A Distant hero
- Act of Valour
- The Savage Sky
