= R. D. Lawrence =

Canadian naturalist and writer (1921–2003)

- Born: Ronald Douglas Lawrence; September 12, 1921; Bay of Biscay (aboard a ship)
- Died: November 27, 2003 (aged 82); Haliburton County, Ontario, Canada
- Occupations: Naturalist and writer
- Writing career
- Genres: Nature fiction and non-fiction
- Notable work: Cry Wild (1970)

Ronald Douglas Lawrence (September 12, 1921 – November 27, 2003) was a Canadian naturalist and wildlife author. He was an expert on the wildlife of Canada, on which he wrote more than thirty books, which have been published in 14 languages.

== Biography ==
=== Early life: Spain, Britain, and war ===
Lawrence, one of five children, was born in 1921 on a British passenger ship in the Bay of Biscay off the coast of Spain. His mother was Spanish and his father, a journalist, was British. As a child in northern Spain, Lawrence became interested in nature. In his autobiography, he described his young self as a "happy loner engrossed in the natural world ... I cannot recall a single day when I was bored".

At 14, Lawrence lied about his age so that he could join the Republicans in the Spanish Civil War, and killed a man on his first night to save himself. He served for two years, until in 1938 he found himself outnumbered in the Pyrenees and fled to France. He soon traveled to Britain to rejoin his family, and during the summer of 1939 he worked on the Queen Mary. With the arrival of World War II, he enlisted with the British and spent another five years at war, beginning in September 1939. He was a tank gunner in Dunkirk and North Africa, and participated in D-Day at Normandy, where he was seriously injured in August 1944. His leg was full of shrapnel, but he refused to have it amputated; instead, doctors removed 37 of 39 pieces of shrapnel, and Lawrence determinedly exercised the limb until he no longer walked with a limp. His war experiences scarred him, and are recounted in his 1994 autobiography, which he wrote reluctantly but at the encouragement of his publisher.

After the war, he studied biology at Cambridge University for four years but did not complete his degree. He found academia stifling, bothered by a pedagogy that ignored the first-hand experience of nature. Following Cambridge, he went back to Spain, where he worked as a journalist and novelist. He married a British woman and they had a son in 1953 after returning to Britain.

=== In Canada ===
Lawrence moved to Canada alone in June 1954, later reflecting, "it was as if I had come home after a long absence". Living in Toronto, he became a reporter for the Toronto Star. Within six months he drove west to Rainy River, Ontario and purchased 100 acres of land for a homestead. His wife and son joined him in July 1955. For three years he made a living cutting timber from Crown land and selling it to mills. He and his wife had a second child, but his wife found their Canadian lifestyle lacking, so she took the children to England and filed for divorce. Lawrence was left in the company of his four dogs, one part wolf, which he developed into a sled dog team. During this period Lawrence also sold fur pelts, but he came to view animal trapping as cruel, and stopped.

In 1957 Lawrence left the area and headed west, embarking on months-long wilderness excursions, which he supported by working for newspapers and living frugally. In southeastern British Columbia he tracked a cougar for nine months, and in Ontario he observed a beaver colony for six months. Lawrence was extremely dedicated to wildlife observation, and believed that his close but unobtrusive study provided new insight into animal behavior. He said, for example, that he witnessed starving rabbits commit suicide by running their heads into trees, and saw herbivores like beavers consume flesh. During this period he met Joan (d. 1969), his second wife, in Winnipeg, with whom he raised orphaned animals. By this time Lawrence had rescued moose calves, bear cubs, and wolves. His decades of wilderness adventure and study were the material of his nature writing.

Lawrence returned to Ontario and married Sharon, his third wife. They settled on a 100-acre property—his last home, called "Wolf Hollow"—in the Haliburton Highlands. He and Sharon rehabilitated wildlife, and Lawrence now lectured and supervised graduate students. According to his wife, "Ron mentored hundreds of young people ... so they in turn could continue to educate and influence younger generations".

The naturalist acknowledged Henry David Thoreau as a great influence in his life: "At fourteen I read Walden and was deeply impressed by one of Thoreau's sentences: 'In wildness is the preservation of the world.'" He was concerned and angry about humankind's treatment of nature, but generally kept his opinions out of his writing; he opposed clear-cut logging and the hunts of bears and wolves that were organized to control deer populations. He loved wolves and considered them the "ultimate stabilizers" in their ecosystems. In his memoir (The Green Trees Beyond, 1994), he wrote of his preference for nature over civilization, and explained how (per one reviewer) "he was taught to love for the first time by a wolf". He reared a number of abandoned wolves: in his memoir, he wrote, "We cannot make up our minds whether we are a family of four people or a pack of four wolves ... The wolves, of course, have no doubt about the matter. They see us as a pack, Sharon fulfilling the role of much loved materfamilias, myself as the pack leader."

Lawrence finished his last book in 1997, and had four in progress at the time of his death. Cry Wild (1970), a book about wolves, is Lawrence's most popular; a 1991 reprint in the United States sold 1.5 million copies in three months. Lawrence kept a low profile, which may explain his relative lack of fame in Canada, but his writing brought him much attention: he and Sharon received six thousand visitors to their Haliburton homestead over 12 years. Lawrence died of Alzheimer's disease on November 27, 2003, in Haliburton County, Ontario.

== Books ==
The following is a list of most of Lawrence's works.

- Wildlife in Canada, 1966
- The Place in the Forest, 1967
- Where the Water Lilies Grow, 1968
- The Poison Makers, 1969
- Cry Wild, 1970. Lawrence's first novel is about a family of wolves.
- Maple Syrup, 1971
- Wildlife in North America: Mammals, 1974
- Wildlife in North America: Birds, 1974. With the previous volume, portraits of 51 bird species and 52 mammals, with discussion of behavior.
- Paddy, 1977. An account of raising an orphaned baby beaver and observations on beaver behavior and intelligence.
- Discover Ste. Marie, 1978
- The North Runner, 1979. The story of Yukon, Lawrence's wolf-dog, and their bond.
- Secret Go the Wolves, 1980. An account of raising two wolf pups, with reflections on the role of predators.
- The Study of Life: A Naturalist’s View, 1980
- The Zoo That Never Was, 1981. An account of rehabilitating various wild animals, particularly a black bear cub, on Lawrence's Ontario farm.
- Voyage of the Stella, 1982. Lawrence explored the coast of B.C. and Alaska on a 24-foot boat following the death of his wife.
- The Ghost Walker, 1983. Recounts Lawrence's trials in observing cougars in British Columbia.
- Canada's National Parks, 1983
- The Shark, 1985
- In Praise of Wolves, 1986. Lawrence describes his "love affair" with wolves.
- Trans-Canada Country, 1986
- The Natural History of Canada, 1988. A well-illustrated introduction to Canadian natural history.
- For the Love of Mike (Pour L'Amour de Mike), 1989
- Wolves, 1990
- The White Puma, 1990
- Trail of the Wolf, 1993
- The Green Trees Beyond, 1994
- A Shriek in the Forest Night, 1996
- Owls, the Silent Fliers, 1997
- Cry Wild, 2005
- Ghost Walker, 2009
- In Praise of Wolves, 2012

== Awards ==
- 1967 and 1968 – Frank H. Kortright Award, for "excellence of writing in the field of conservation"
- 1980 – Best non-fiction paperback, Canadian Paperback Publishers Association, for The North Runner
- 1981 – Honorary member of the Mark Twain Society for "contribution to conservation writing"
- 1984 – Best non-fiction award, Canadian Authors Association, for The Ghost Walker
- 1993 – Commemorative Medal of Canada, presented by Ontario Lieutenant Governor Henry N.R. Jackman, in recognition of "your contribution and service to your community"
- 2004 – Lifetime Achievement in Wildlife and Wilderness Conservation Through Writing, from Earthroots, a Canadian conservation organization
- 2007 – Lifetime Achievement Award, International Fund for Animal Welfare, awarded posthumously for Lawrence's "passion, dedication and commitment to animals and the natural environment"
