= Snow Wolf =

1996 novel by Glenn Meade

Snow Wolf is an espionage novel by Irish writer Glenn Meade. Published in 1996, its plot concerns a covert attempt by US operatives on the life of the Soviet dictator Joseph Stalin in late 1952 and early 1953.

== Reception ==
Kirkus Reviews wrote, "An impressive debut by a storyteller worth watching". Publishers Weekly wrote, "The Cold War may be on ice, but through this literate, memorable story, Meade shows that it can still freeze readers' attention and chill their blood".
