= Jürgen Thorwald =

German writer, journalist and historian (1915–2006)

Jürgen Thorwald (born Heinz Bongartz, October 28, 1915 – April 4, 2006) was a German writer, journalist and historian known for his works describing the history of forensic medicine and of World War II.

Thorwald was a native of Solingen, Rhenish Prussia, and attended the University of Cologne. He started his career in 1933 at age 18, during the Nazi era, writing for publications such as Die Braune Post ("The Brown Mail"), the SS journal Das Schwarze Korps ("The Black Corps") and the NSDAP paper National-Zeitung. During the war he worked as a propaganda writer, focusing on the Luftwaffe, Kriegsmarine and the general German war effort.

After the war he used the pseudonym Jürgen Thorwald in order to be able to work under allied occupation. In 1947 he legally adopted the new name.

Thorwald's book The Century of the Detective was nominated for the Edgar Allan Poe Award in 1966 in Best Fact Crime category but he lost to Truman Capote's In Cold Blood. In 1984 he was awarded the Order of Merit of the Federal Republic of Germany. Thorwald died in Lugano.

== Bibliography ==
- Luftmacht Deutschland. Luftwaffe, Industrie, Luftfahrt, 1939 (preface by Hermann Göring)
- Die große Flucht - published originally as two books, later as one or two, English language title Defeat in the East: Russia Conquers-January to May 1945, originally published as Flight in the Winter.
  - Es begann an der Weichsel, 1948
  - Das Ende an der Elbe, 1950
- Die ungeklärten Fälle, 1950
- Wen sie verderben wollen..., 1952
- Der Fall Pastorius, 1953
- Blut der Könige. Das Drama der Bluterkrankheit in den europäischen Fürstenhäusern, 1954
- Das Jahrhundert der Chirurgen, 1956 (The Century of the Surgeon)
- Das Weltreich der Chirurgen, 1958 (The Triumph of Surgery)
- Die Entlassung. Das Ende des Chirurgen Ferdinand Sauerbruch, 1960 (The dismissal: The Last Days of Ferdinand Sauerbruch)
- Macht und Geheimnis der frühen Ärzte, 1962
- Das Jahrhundert der Detektive, 1964 (Century of the Detective: Volume 1 in English "The Marks of Cain" (1965), Volume 2 "Dead Men Tell Tales" (1966, ISBN 0-330-02131-1))
- Die Stunde der Detektive. Werden und Welten der Kriminalistik, 1966
- Macht und Geheimnis der frühen Ärzte, 1967
- Die Traum-Oase, 1968
- Die Patienten, 1971 (The Patients)
- Die Illusion. Rotarmisten in Hitlers Heeren, 1974 (The Illusion: Soviet Soldiers in Hitler's Armies)
- Das Gewürz. Die Saga der Juden in Amerika, 1978
- Im zerbrechlichen Haus der Seele. Ein Jahrhundert der Gehirnchirurgen, der Gehirnforscher, der Seelensucher, 1986
- Die Monteverdi-Mission Droemer Knaur, München 1989, Neufassung: Juli 1998
- Der geplagte Mann. Die Prostata - Geschichte und Geschichten, 1994
