= Daisy Newman =

American writer

Daisy Newman (1904–1994) was a writer born in Britain to American parents.

== Biography ==
Newman was educated at Radcliffe College, Barnard College, and Oxford University. She wrote novels and non-fiction about Quakers (the Society of Friends) in America. She married George Selleck late in life. Both were elders at a Friends Meeting in Cambridge, Massachusetts.

Newman's novels include: Now That April's There (1945), Diligence in Love (1951), The Autumn's Brightness (1955), I Take Thee, Serenity (1975), Indian Summer of the Heart (1982), and A Golden String (1986). She wrote a history of American Quakers entitled A Procession of Friends. Published in 1972, it is about the active position of Friends in opposing slavery, in relation with the native peoples of North America, in opposing war and capital punishment, and in supporting the humane treatment of the mentally ill and prisoners.

== See also ==
- Testimony of equality
