= Flanagan's Run =

1982 novel by Tom McNab

- First edition (publ. Hodder & Stoughton)
- Author: Tom McNab
- Publisher: Hodder & Stoughton
- Publication date: March 1, 1982
- ISBN: 978-0-340-24393-0

Flanagan's Run is a 1982 novel written by Scottish athlete and author Tom McNab.

Set in 1931, the story covers an epic footrace across the continental United States. 2,000 runners run the 3,000 miles from Los Angeles to New York City competing for a prize of $150,000. The fictional race was inspired by the actual 1928 Bunion Derby, which covered the same route.

On its publication in 1982, the book sold several hundred thousand copies, topped The Times bestseller list in the UK, and was translated into 16 languages.

An audiobook version of Flanagan's Run, read by actor Rupert Degas, was published in 2010. Movie rights are owned by Miramax Films.
