= The Cry and the Covenant =

1949 biographical novel by Morton Thompson

Cover of first edition

The Cry and the Covenant is a 1949 biographical novel about Austrian-Hungarian physician Ignaz Semmelweis, written by Morton Thompson. Semmelweis, who practiced medicine in the mid-19th century in Vienna, is known for his research into puerperal fever and his discoveries concerning the importance of medical hygiene to save lives. The novel depicts the historical setting in which Semmelweis lived, details his youth and education, and recounts his scientific breakthroughs as well as the resistance he encountered from the medical establishment.

== Synopsis ==
Ignaz Semmelweis is a curious child who often gets in trouble at school for asking too many questions. As a young man, he travels from his native Hungary to Vienna to study medicine; he becomes an obstetrician at the Vienna Lying-In (labor and delivery) Hospital. He excels in his work and is promoted to a leadership position in the hospital. During that period in the first half of the 19th century, before the germ theory of disease or antibiotics were known, European women giving birth were being ravaged by puerperal fever, a bacterial infection. Semmelweis notices that the Vienna hospital unit operated by the medical school for training physicians has triple the death rate from puerperal fever as that of the adjacent hospital unit run by midwives. To learn the reason for the vast difference in outcomes, he embarks on a painstaking investigation.

Without fully understanding the mechanisms at work, he theorizes that infection is being spread from one patient to another by contact, facilitated by frequent patient exams made by medical students who don't routinely wash their hands between examinations. Over the resistance and ridicule of the hospital administration and staff, Semmelweis implements a strict practice of hand washing with disinfectant before every patient contact. This brings the hospital death rate down to virtually zero. Even so, the hospital administration and general medical community refuse to adopt Semmelweis's ideas or practice on a wider basis. Enraged at the medical establishment's failure to save women's lives by this simple procedure, he writes letters to medical journals accusing physicians of being murderers. Eventually, more and more overwrought by his frustration, he becomes mentally unbalanced, passing out handbills in the street telling women to demand of their doctors that they wash their hands. He starts to behave so erratically that he is committed to an insane asylum, where because of a cut finger he contracts and dies of the very disease he spent his life fighting.

== Legacy ==
A legacy of Semmelweis, highlighted in The Cry and the Covenant, is that hand washing, to this day, remains the most effective method of preventing the spread of infection.
