= David Beaty (author) =

British writer (1919-1999)

Arthur David Beaty
- Born: 28 March 1919
- Died: 4 December 1999 (aged 80)
- Occupation: Psychologist, aircraft pilot
- Language: English language
- Alma mater: Merton College

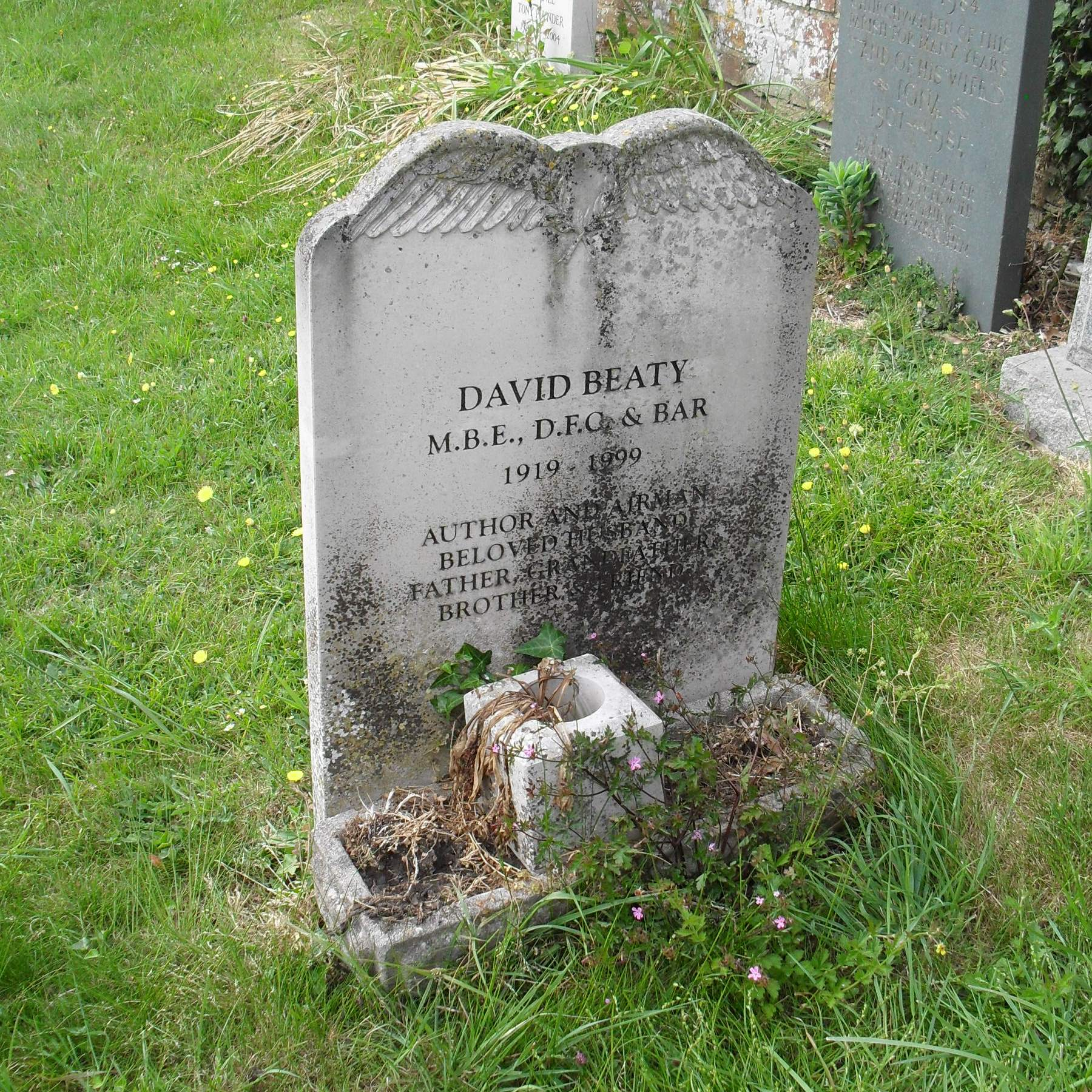
Grave of David Beaty at St Mary's Church, Slindon, West Sussex

Arthur David Beaty (28 March 1919 – 4 December 1999) was a British writer, pilot and psychologist notable as a pioneer in the field of human factors, now an integral branch of aviation medicine, which he argued played a central role in aviation accidents attributed to pilot error.

== Early life ==
Beaty was born in Hatton, Ceylon on 28 March 1919, the son of a Methodist minister, and was educated at the Kingswood School followed by Merton College, Oxford where he read History and edited Cherwell, a student newspaper. Whilst at Oxford the Second World War broke out prompting him to volunteer for pilot training with Oxford University Air Squadron.

== Career ==
=== Aviation ===
Beaty was initially rejected by the RAF pilot selection panel. Thanks largely to the support of his university tutors, he eventually passed selection and completed flying training, receiving a pilot grading of 'exceptional'.

Following flying training, Beaty joined RAF Coastal Command flying the Consolidated Liberator. He completed four tours with 206 Squadron and won a Distinguished Flying Cross and bar. During an attack on a U-boat in the Baltic his aircraft was badly damaged, with a number of the control surfaces, including the rudder, being shot away. Beaty brought the aircraft back to base for a successful landing. Upon inspection, over 600 holes were counted in the aircraft.

After the war, Beaty was offered a regular commission with the RAF. However, he turned down the opportunity and joined BOAC where he was posted to the carrier's flagship route across the North Atlantic. His flying career with BOAC was short-lived. Soon, he took up writing on a full-time basis.

=== Writing ===
==== Novels ====
Beaty wrote 20 novels, under the names Paul Stanton and Robert Stanton, starting at the end of his commercial flying career and continuing almost until his death. Flying has an important place in many of them.

In 1960, Alfred Hitchcock bought the rights to Beaty's novel Village of Stars but never produced the film. Another novel of Beaty's was produced as the film Cone of Silence (1960) starring George Sanders.

- The Take Off (1949) (US title: The Donnington Legend)
- The Heart of the Storm (1954) (US title: The Four Winds)
- The Proving Flight (1956)
- Cone of Silence (1959)
- Call Me Captain (1959)
- Village of Stars (1960) (writing as Paul Stanton)
- The Wind Off The Sea (1962)
- The Siren Song (1964)
- Milk and Honey (1964)
- Sword of Honour (1965)
- The Gun Garden (1965)
- The Temple Tree (1971)
- Electric Train (1975)
- Excellency (1977)
- The White Sea Bird (1979)
- Wings of the Morning (1982) (with Betty Beaty)
- The Stick (1984)
- The Blood Brothers (1987)
- Eagles (1990)
- The Ghosts of the Eighth Attack (1998)

==== Non-fiction writing, flight safety, and human factors ====
Already an accomplished novelist, Beaty turned his attention to identifying the possible causes behind aviation accidents attributed to pilot error, enrolling at University College London to read psychology. Having completed the degree course in a single year, rather than the traditional three years, Beaty became a civil servant in 1967 before publishing his first non-fiction work, The Human Factor in Aircraft Accidents in 1969. This was followed by The Water Jump: The Story of Transatlantic Flight (1976), The Complete Skytraveller (1979) and Strange Encounters: Mysteries of the Air (1982), before he returned to the subject of his first non-fiction book in The Naked Pilot - The Human Factor in Aircraft Accidents (1991). Finally Light Perpetual: Aviators' Memorial Windows appeared in 1995.

His first book was met with considerable resistance, not least from a number of aviators, because it portrayed pilots as ordinary human beings, susceptible to errors and mistakes. However, Beaty's work resulted in further interest in the subject, which has now become an accepted part of flying training and is a compulsory module on many private and professional flying courses.

=== Radio ===
On 10 June 1972, a 90-minute adaptation of Beaty's novel The Temple Tree, scripted by Betty Davies and Michael Spice, was transmitted in BBC Radio 4's Saturday Night Theatre slot. Beaty himself subsequently wrote a drama serial for Radio 4 entitled The Magic Carpet. The story of the doomed airship R101, it was transmitted from 27 November 1983 to 8 January 1984 in seven 30-minute episodes.

== Death ==
Beaty died on 4 December 1999 in Slindon, West Sussex. His wife, Betty Campbell Beaty, wrote Winged life: A Biography of David Beaty in 2001.
