= Wolfgang Ott =

Austrian sex offender and murderer

- Born: 1957 (age 68–69); Austria
- Conviction: Murder
- Penalty: Life imprisonment

Details
- Victims: 2+
- Span of crimes: 1995–1996
- Country: Austria
- State: Styria

Wolfgang Ott (born 1957) is an Austrian sex offender, murderer and alleged serial killer, whose actions are considered some of the most spectacular criminal cases in his home country.

== Offenses and alleged crimes ==
Wolfgang Ott was sentenced to 15 months probation and psychiatric treatment at the age of 16 for sexual assault. After two failed kidnapping attempts on women, he kidnapped 23-year old bank employee Sonja S. on May 30, 1995, and held her for three days in his home in Liesing, Vienna, where he repeatedly raped and abused her. He then went with her to Styria, where he undressed her on the bank of the Salza river, tied her up and threw her in the river, where she drowned. Her body was recovered on June 26 in Landl.

On June 10, 1995, he kidnapped the 19-year-old high school graduate Karin M. in Vienna, raped and abused her several times before strangling her on a bank of the Salza, burying the body in a wooded area in Palfau. Her body was found two years later, on June 6, 1997.

On June 12, 1995, he abducted a 43-year old businesswoman in Perchtoldsdorf and detained her in his home for over 20 hours, raping her as well. When he left the house for a short time, she managed to escape and alerted the police, who immediately began looking for Ott. In the meantime, Ott kidnapped and raped two more women, one of whom managed to escape. The other, a 23-year old mountain climber, he transported over 600 km in the trunk of his van to a bank of the Salza river and released her there, after she had promised to meet him again.

On June 20, 1995, Wolfgang Ott was arrested near the Attersee lake in Upper Austria by the gendarmerie. He had been riding a bicycle and had tried in vain to pose as a German tourist.

On June 23, 1995, the police found the body of 34-year old Helga V. near Sonja S.'s burial site. It is still being investigated if Ott has any connection to this crime. In addition, authorities are also trying to clarify whether he also murdered 17-year old Martina Posch, whose body was found on November 22, 1986, on the shores of lake Mondsee in Upper Austria.

On October 3, 1996, he was sentenced to life imprisonment and admission to an institution for mentally ill lawbreakers for the murder of Sonja S. On February 24, 1999, he was again sentenced to life imprisonment by the Landesgericht Leoben for the murder of Karin M.

== Imprisonment ==
On July 1, 2004, while working in the carpentry shop of the Graz-Karlau Prison, Ott hid himself in a box secured with snap-on hinges and let inmates load him into a hospital-owned truck that was to drive to the Maria Lankowitz satellite camp. At the prison, however, he was discovered during a routine inspection of the vehicle. For this, Ott faced the following consequences: he was withdrawn from the joinery and the local activity for the time being. He also got three weeks in solitary confinement. His escape attempt led to the installation of a pulse rate meter in the lock area.

On April 24, 2017, after being found with about 20 painkillers in his detention room at the Stein Prison, was admitted to the Krems Hospital with suspected drug abuse. Three days later, on April 27, 2017, he was returned to the detention center. The reason behind the incident is unknown.

== Literature ==
- Andreas and Regina Zeppelzauer: Mord. Die spektakulärsten Mordfälle Österreichs. Verlag f. Sammler, Graz 2005, ISBN 3-85365-215-8.
- Alexandra Wehner: Spuren des Bösen. Österreichs gefährlichste Verbrecher. Ueberreuter, Wien 2007, ISBN 978-3-8000-7310-8.

== See also ==
- List of serial killers by country

== Sources ==
- serial killers by name O: OTT Wolfgang. auf: crimeZZZnet
- Ernst Geiger, Paul Yvon: Es gibt durchaus noch schöne Morde: Die spannendsten und skurrilsten Kriminalfälle der letzten 25 Jahre. K & S, Wien 2005, ISBN 3-218-00759-3.
- Zweiter Ott-Prozess hängt an Haar, Wiener Zeitung
- Tote im Weinviertel: Tat eines Serienmörders?, Presse
- Nach Fluchtversuch aus Karlau: Ott wird von Justizwache „zurückgestuft“, News
- Wolfgang Ott schuldig gesprochen, Wiener Zeitung
