= Richard Collier (historian) =

British writer (1924–1996)

Richard Collier (1924–1996) was an English journalist, military historian and novelist.

== Life ==
Born in Croydon, Collier joined the RAF in 1942 and was War Associate Editor of Lord Mountbatten's magazine Phoenix: An Allied Magazine for All Allied Forces in South East Asia. After the war, he joined the Daily Mail as a feature writer.

For his 1971 biography of Mussolini, Collier employed three administrative assistants to coordinate the work of 30 research assistants and eight translators. The book's New York Times reviewer found the book uncritical but easy to read and entertaining.

Collier's 1974 The Plague of the Spanish Lady was the first book-length treatment of the Spanish flu pandemic of 1918–19. For the book Collier advertised around the world, asking for memories and eye-witness accounts. The correspondence which he collected is now held by the Imperial War Museum.

== Works ==
=== Novels ===
- Beautiful Friend, 1947

=== Non-fiction ===
- Ten Thousand Eyes: The Amazing Story of the Spy Network That Cracked Hitler's Atlantic Wall Before D-Day, 1958
- The City that Would Not Die: The Bombing of London, May 10–11, 1941, 1959
- A House Called Memory, 1960
- The Sands of Dunkirk, 1961
- The Great Indian Mutiny: A Dramatic Account of the Sepoy Rebellion, 1963
- The General Next to God: The story of William Booth and the Salvation Army, 1965
- Eagle Day: The Battle of Britain, August 6-September 15, 1940, 1966
- The River that God Forgot: The Story of the Amazon Rubber Boom, 1968
- Duce!: The Rise and Fall of Benito Mussolini, 1971
- The Plague of the Spanish Lady: The Influenza Pandemic of 1918-1919, 1974
- The War in the Desert, 1977
- Bridge Across the Sky: The Berlin Blockade and Airlift, 1948-1949, 1978
- 1940, The Avalanche, 1979
- The Road to Pearl Harbor--1941, 1981
- The Freedom Road, 1944-1945, 1983
- The Rainbow People: A Gaudy World of the Very Rich and Those Who Served Them, 1984
- Make-believe: The Magic of International Theatre, 1986
- Their Finest Hour: The Battle of Britain Remembered, 1989
- The Few: Summer 1940, The Battle of Britain, 1989
- The Warcos: The War Correspondents of World War Two, 1989
- D-Day, June 6, 1944: The Normandy Landings, 1992
- The Past is a Foreign Country: Scenes from a Life, 1996
