= Morton Thompson =

American journalist

Morton Thompson (c. 1907 – July 7, 1953) was an American writer of newspaper journalism, novels and film screenplays.

== Career ==
Amongst his works were a collection of journalistic memoirs called Joe, the Wounded Tennis Player, and the novels Not as a Stranger (which was turned into a film directed by Stanley Kramer and a radio play broadcast on Colombian network Radio Sutatenza in Spanish) and The Cry and the Covenant.

He had a column in the Hollywood Citizen-News which he signed "N.N.W.," explaining that the initials came from a Shakespeare line, "I am but mad when the wind is North North West."

== Personal life ==
He was a friend of the writer Robert Benchley. His second wife, Frances Pindyck, a literary agent with the Leland Hayward Agency, represented Dashiell Hammett and Betty Smith, among others.

== Thompson's Turkey ==
He was also the inventor of the recipe, Thompson Turkey.
