= The Rainbow People (book) =

1984 book by Richard Collier

- Author: Richard Collier
- Language: English
- Genre: Non-fiction
- Publication date: 1984

The Rainbow People is a 1984 book by Richard Collier. The book describes a subculture of transatlantic-based wealthy hedonists. Collier says, "The era of the Rainbow People opened with the coronation of a prince called 'Tum-Tum' as Britain's Edward VII in 1902 and closed in 1975 with the death of Aristotle Onassis, dubbed 'Daddy-O' by Women's Wear Daily."
