= Helen Hoover =

American nature writer (1910-1984)

Helen Hoover was an American nature writer who wrote four popular adult books and three books for the juvenile market in the 1960s and 1970s. She and her husband Adrian, an illustrator of her books, moved from Chicago to a remote cabin in northern Minnesota in 1954, which became the source of material for her books.

== Early life and career ==
Hoover had an unconventional career for a woman. Born January 20, 1910, in Greenville, Ohio, Hoover was the daughter of Thomas Franklin and Hannah Gomersall Blackburn. She attended Ohio University from 1927 to 1929, until her father died suddenly in 1929. She and her mother moved to Chicago out of economic necessity, where Helen sought work as an addressograph operator and as a proofreader. During World War II, she was able to get a job as an analytical chemist with Pittsburgh Testing Laboratory and also took night courses at De Paul University and the University of Chicago. Following the war, she was able to continue in this field, working at Ahlberg Bearing Company as a metallurgist from 1945 to 1948. In 1948 she became a research metallurgist at International Harvester Co., where her work earned her a patent for agricultural implement disks.

While in Chicago, she met Adrian Everett Hoover, an artist, and they were married in 1937.

== Move to the North Woods ==
"We moved to our log cabin on the Canadian border of Minnesota, and there, under the grim necessity of earning money or starving, I began to write seriously... articles on the natural world around us." From 1959 to 1969 Hoover was a regular contributor to Humpty Dumpty magazine and wrote the "Wilderness Chat" column for Defenders of Wildlife News from 1963 to 1973. She was a contributor of features and articles to Audubon, American Mercury, Gourmet, Organic Gardening and Farming, Saturday Review, Living Wilderness and Woman's Journal (London). It was through contacts made through writing for children's and nature magazines that she received her first book contract.

Hoover's first book, The Long-Shadowed Forest (Thomas Crowell, 1963; University of Minnesota Press 1999), focused on the flora and fauna surrounding their cabin; it served as a basic guidebook to the northern woods. Her second, and best-selling book, The Gift of the Deer (Alfred A. Knopf, 1966; University of Minnesota Press, 1999), followed the life of a starving buck deer that happened upon their cabin one Christmas. The story of Peter the buck and his subsequent offspring became a bestseller and was the first of three books serialized by Reader's Digest Condensed Books. In 1966 she also wrote her first juvenile book, Animals at My Doorstep (Parents Magazine Press, 1966). A Place in the Woods (Alfred A. Knopf, 1969; University of Minnesota Press, 1999) followed, telling the story of how the Hoovers gave up their professional careers in Chicago and moved to northern Minnesota and related the challenges they encountered in their first six months there. Her final adult book The Years of the Forest (Alfred A. Knopf, 1973: University of Minnesota Press, 2001), covered the 17 years the Hoovers lived in northern Minnesota before leaving the area permanently.

Hoover's other books for the juvenile market were Great Wolf and the Good Woodsman (Parents Magazine Press, 1967; University of Minnesota Press, 2006) and Animals Near and Far (Parents Magazine Press, 1970).

Following the success of her books and the growing development around their cabin, the Hoover's left northern Minnesota to visit other parts of the U.S., moving to Taos, New Mexico, where an author and illustrator could live without attracting attention. The Hoover's eventually settled in Laramie, Wyoming, where they lived the remainder of their lives.

== Legacy ==
Hoover was part of a group of mid-20th century nature writers such as Aldo Leopold, Sigurd Olson, Rachel Carson, Edwin Way Teale and Calvin Rutstrum whose writing appealed to people's love for, and appreciation of, nature, and which kindled a sense to protect the environment. As a scientist, Hoover brought an analytical eye to her writing, as evidenced by the guide-like quality of her first book, The Long-Shadowed Forest. Written in the early 1960s but not published until 1963, Hoover also recognized the danger of DDT and detailed its harmful effects on wildlife at the same time Rachel Carson was making the same claim in her seminal work Silent Spring.

Her subsequent books were more personal and observational of the life she and her husband led adapting from city life to that of the remote woods. The books were extremely popular with readers, leading to all three being selected as Reader's Digest Condensed Book selections.

Although she considered writing in other genres, she was never published again.

== Death ==
Hoover died from peritonitis in Fort Collins, Colorado, on June 30, 1984.

== List of Works ==
- The Long-Shadowed Forest (1963)
- The Gift of the Deer (1966)
- Animals at My Doorstep (juvenile, 1966)
- Great Wolf and the Good Woodsman (juvenile, 1967)
- A Place in the Woods (1969)
- Animals Near and Far (juvenile, 1970)
- The Years of the Forest (1973)
