= Glenn Meade =

Irish author (born 1957)

- Born: Finglas, Ireland
- Occupations: Novelist, playwright
- Writing career
- Notable works: Snow Wolf, Resurrection Day, The Second Messiah, The Romanov Conspiracy, The Cairo Code, The Last Witness, Brandenburg, Unquiet Ghosts, Web of Deceit, The Devil’s Disciple.

Glenn Meade is an Irish author. He was born in Finglas, Dublin. He has written fiction, plays, and screenplays. He has lectured on writing in the USA, and Europe.

== Career ==
In the late 1980s Meade wrote and directed a number of his own plays for the Strand Theatre in Dublin. He originally worked as a pilot trainer for Aer Lingus, before becoming a journalist for The Irish Times and Irish Independent newspapers. In 1994, he released his first novel, Brandenburg, which garnered much critical acclaim. Meade now writes full-time.

His books have been translated into 29 languages, including Swedish, French, German, Dutch, Spanish, Chinese and Turkish.

His work The Second Messiah was published in English in summer 2011, by Simon & Schuster in New York. Meade divides his time between Ireland, and on occasion, the USA.

He was one of the Irish delegates at the European Writers Conference in Istanbul in 2010.

== Bibliography ==
=== Fiction ===
- Brandenburg (1994)
- Snow Wolf (1996)
- The Sands of Sakkara (1999)
- Resurrection Day (2002)
- Web of Deceit (2004)
- The Devil's Disciple (2006)
- The Second Messiah (2011)
- Seconds to Disaster (2012, with Ray Rohan)
- The Romanov Conspiracy (2012)
- The Last Witness (2014)
- Unquiet Ghosts (2017)
