= Illalu Priyuralu =

1984 Telugu film starring Sobhan Babu

- Theatrical release poster
- Directed by: A. Kodandarami Reddy
- Written by: Satyanand (Dialogues)
- Screenplay by: A. Kodandarami Reddy
- Based on: Masoom by Shekhar Kapur; Man, Woman and Child by Erich Segal
- Produced by: G. Babu
- Starring: Sobhan Babu; Suhasini; Pallavi (actress)
- Cinematography: B. S. Lokanath
- Edited by: J. Krishna Swamy
- Music by: Chakravarthy
- Production company: Babu Arts
- Release date: 2 August 1984
- Country: India
- Language: Telugu

Illalu Priyuralu is a 1984 Indian Telugu-language drama film directed by A. Kodandarami Reddy. The film is a remake of the Bollywood film Masoom, which was adapted from the 1980 novel Man, Woman and Child by Erich Segal. The novel had two other film adaptations: the 1983 American film of the same title and the 1982 Malayalam film Olangal. Illalu Priyuralu was produced by G. Babu under Babu Arts and featured Sobhan Babu, Suhasini, Pallavi and Master Arjun in the lead roles. The film has musical score by Chakravarthy.

== Cast ==
- Sobhan Babu
- Suhasini
- Pallavi
- Baby Meena
- Master Arjun
- Sathyanarayana
- Sutti Veerabhadra Rao
- Suthi Velu
- Subha
- Annapoorna
- Sri Lakshmi
- Telephone Sathyanarayana
- Dr. Madan Mohan
- Master Prabhakar

== Soundtrack ==
Music was composed by Chakravarthy.

S.No	Song title	Singers
1	"Aadhivaaram Ardhangiki"	
2	"Idhi Kadha Kaadhu"	
3	"Yemito Kalavaram"	
4	"Yemani Thelipedhi"	
5	"Thagithe Papama"	S. P. Balasubrahmanyam
