= Dick Richards =

American film director (b. 1936)

- Born: 1936 (age 89–90); New York City, New York, U.S.
- Occupations: Film director, screenwriter, producer

Richard M. Richards (born 1936) is an American filmmaker and photographer. He began his career as a photographer and commercial director, before making his theatrical film debut with the revisionist Western The Culpepper Cattle Co. (1972). He was nominated for the Academy Award for Best Picture for producing Tootsie (1982).

== Career ==
=== Photography and commercials ===
Born and raised in Brooklyn, New York, Richards rose to prominence during the 1960s advertising revolution, becoming a world-renowned photographer and commercial director with clients including Coca-Cola, Volkswagen, Polaroid, General Motors, Hertz, Pepsi, etc.

His celebrated advertising work won every major industry award including the Cannes Lion for best worldwide commercial, as well as multiple Clio’s and New York Art Director Awards. Pauline Kael referred to Richards as "a photographer who became a whiz at TV commercials [before directing movies]".

Wilford Brimley, who worked with Dick Richards on Death Valley, said in one of the commercials he did for Liberty Medical that Richards was his "best friend and partner". Brimley further claimed that Richards helped him to produce television commercials for the company to raise awareness of diabetes and provide diabetics with useful information.

=== Film ===
After years in the New York commercial world, Richards moved to Hollywood and directed his first feature film, The Culpepper Cattle Co. (1972), which was praised for its historical accuracy and period atmosphere. The film won Richards the WGA's Screen Writer's Annual Story Award and earned Jerry Bruckheimer his first film credit as associate producer. Richards and Bruckheimer, friends from their commercial days, went on to make three more movies together.

After seeing his directorial debut, Universal Pictures producers Richard D. Zanuck and David Brown hired Richards to direct the film Jaws (1975). They soon grew irritated by Richards's habit of describing the shark as a white whale (which also put off author Peter Benchley) and dropped him from the project, replacing him with Steven Spielberg.

Richards' next film, Rafferty and the Gold Dust Twins (1975), starring Alan Arkin, Mackenzie Phillips and Harry Dean Stanton, opened to positive reviews. In her book, Reeling, Pauline Kael calls Richards "A real southpaw" and said that, "Rafferty and the Gold Dust Twins sneaks up on you-you discover it like a ‘sleeper.’ I found it a funny, velvety film, with the kind of tenderness you can almost feel on your fingertips."

That same year Richards directed Robert Mitchum and Charlotte Rampling in the Raymond Chandler adaptation, Farewell, My Lovely (1975). Roger Ebert said the movie "Never steps wrong" and called it "a totally assured piece of work". Sylvia Miles earned a Best Supporting Actress Nomination. Sylvester Stallone also appears on screen in an early, pre-Rocky role. Film critic Rex Reed said, "Farewell, My Lovely is the kind of movie Humphrey Bogart would have stood in line to see."

Richards went on to direct the British war drama March or Die (1977), starring Gene Hackman, Catherine Deneuve, and Terence Hill; the horror film Death Valley (1982); an adaptation of Erich Segal’s book by the same name, Man, Woman, and Child (1983), starring Martin Sheen and Blythe Danner; and Heat (1986), starring Burt Reynolds.

In 1983 Richards won the Golden Globe for Best Motion Picture - Comedy for Tootsie (1982), which he optioned, developed and produced with Sydney Pollack. The film was nominated for 10 Academy Awards (including a Best Picture nomination for Richards and Pollack). Roger Ebert gave the film 4 out of 4 stars praised the film as "the kind of Movie with a capital M that they used to make in the 1940s, when they weren’t afraid to mix up absurdity with seriousness, social comment with farce, and a little heartfelt tenderness right in there with the laughs." In 1998, the United States Library of Congress deemed the film "culturally significant" and selected it for preservation in the National Film Registry.

== Personal life ==
Richards has been married to his wife, Hilke Richards, since 1963. They have four children.

== Filmography ==
Year	Title	Director	Writer	Producer	Notes
1972	The Culpepper Cattle Company	Yes	Yes	No	
1975	Rafferty and the Gold Dust Twins	Yes	No	No	
1975	Farewell, My Lovely	Yes	No	No	
1977	March or Die	Yes	Yes	Yes	
1982	Death Valley	Yes	No	No	
1983	Man, Woman and Child	Yes	No	No	
1986	Heat	Yes	No	No	Credited as 'R.M. Richards'; Replaced by Jerry Jameson during filming

=== Producer only ===
- Tootsie (1982)

== Awards and nominations ==
Ceremony	Category	Work	Result	Ref.
55th Academy Awards	Best Picture	Tootsie	Nominated	
37th British Academy Film Awards	Best Film	Tootsie	Nominated	
