= Masoom (1983 film) =

Hindi film

- Poster
- Directed by: Shekhar Kapur
- Screenplay by: Gulzar
- Based on: Man, Woman and Child by Erich Segal
- Produced by: Chanda Dutt; Devi Dutt
- Starring: Shabana Azmi; Naseeruddin Shah; Saeed Jaffrey
- Cinematography: Pravin Bhatt
- Edited by: Aruna Raje; Vikas Desai
- Music by: R. D. Burman
- Distributed by: Bombino Video
- Release date: 21 October 1983; (India)
- Running time: 165 minutes
- Country: India
- Language: Hindi

Masoom (transl. The Innocent) is a 1983 Indian Hindi-language drama film, the directorial debut of Shekhar Kapur. It is an adaptation of the 1980 Erich Segal novel Man, Woman and Child, which was also adapted into a Malayalam movie Olangal and an American movie Man, Woman and Child. The film stars Shabana Azmi, Naseeruddin Shah and Saeed Jaffrey in lead roles, with Tanuja and Supriya Pathak in special appearances. It features Urmila Matondkar, Aradhana and Jugal Hansraj in their debuts as child actors. The screenplay, dialogues and lyrics are by Gulzar with music by R.D. Burman. The film has been remade into a Telugu movie named Illalu Priyuralu and in Turkish as Bir Akşam Üstü.

== Plot ==
Indu and DK have a happy marriage and two daughters — Pinky and Minni — and live in Delhi. The tranquility of their life is interrupted when DK receives word that he has a son, Rahul, the result of an affair with Bhavana during his 1973 visit to Nainital when Indu was about to give birth to Pinky. Bhavana did not tell DK about their son as she did not want to disturb his matrimonial life. Now that she has died, her guardian Masterji sends word to DK that his son, Rahul, who is nine years old, needs a home. Despite the objections of Indu, who is devastated to learn of her husband's infidelity, DK brings the boy to stay with them in Delhi. Rahul is never told that DK is his father as he bonds with DK and his daughters. But Indu can't bear to look at him, a tangible reminder of DK's betrayal.

DK, worried by the effect Rahul is having on his family, decides to put him in a boarding school in St. Joseph's College, Nainital; Rahul accepts with reluctance. After gaining admission at the school and returning to Delhi before his permanent move to Nainital, Rahul figures out that DK is his father and runs away from home. After he is escorted home by a police officer, Rahul confesses his awareness of the identity of his father to Indu. Indu is unable to bear his heartbreak and intercepts Rahul before he is put on the train to Nainital, thereby accepting him into the family and wholeheartedly forgiving DK, after which they drive home happily.

== Cast ==
- Shabana Azmi as Indu Malhotra
- Naseeruddin Shah as DK Malhotra
- Supriya Pathak as Bhavana
- Jugal Hansraj as Rahul Malhotra
- Urmila Matondkar as Pinky Malhotra
- Aradhana Srivastav as Minni Malhotra
- Tanuja as Chanda (special appearance)
- Saeed Jaffrey as Suri
- Satish Kaushik as Tiwari
- Paidi Jairaj as MasterJi
- Malvika Singh as Mrs. Suri

== Soundtrack ==
The music of the movie was composed by R. D. Burman and the lyrics were penned by the noted lyricist Gulzar who also wrote the screenplay for the film. Burman won the Filmfare Award for Best Music for this film.

No.	Title	Singer(s)	Length
1.	"Do Naina Aur Ek Kahani"	Aarti Mukherjee	05:26
2.	"Huzur Is Qadar (Raga Yaman Kalyan)"	Suresh Wadkar, Bhupinder Singh	03:53
3.	"Tujhse Naaraz Nahi Zindagi (Male)"	Anup Ghoshal	05:41
4.	"Lakdi Ki Kaathi"	Vanita Mishra, Gauri Bapat, Gurpreet Kaur	03:57
5.	"Tujhse Naraz Nahin Zindagi (Female)"	Lata Mangeshkar	03:37

== Awards ==
Award	Category	Nominee	Result
31st Filmfare Awards	Best Film	Masoom	Nominated
31st Filmfare Awards	Best Film (Critics)	Shekhar Kapur	Won
31st Filmfare Awards	Best Director	Shekhar Kapur	Nominated
31st Filmfare Awards	Best Actor	Naseeruddin Shah	Won
31st Filmfare Awards	Best Actress	Shabana Azmi	Nominated
31st Filmfare Awards	Best Music Director	R. D. Burman	Won
31st Filmfare Awards	Best Lyricist	Gulzar for "Tujhse Naraaz Nahin"	Won
31st Filmfare Awards	Best Female Playback Singer	Aarti Mukherji for "Do Naina Ek Kahani"	Won
