= Plautus =

Roman comic playwright (c. 254 – 184 BC)

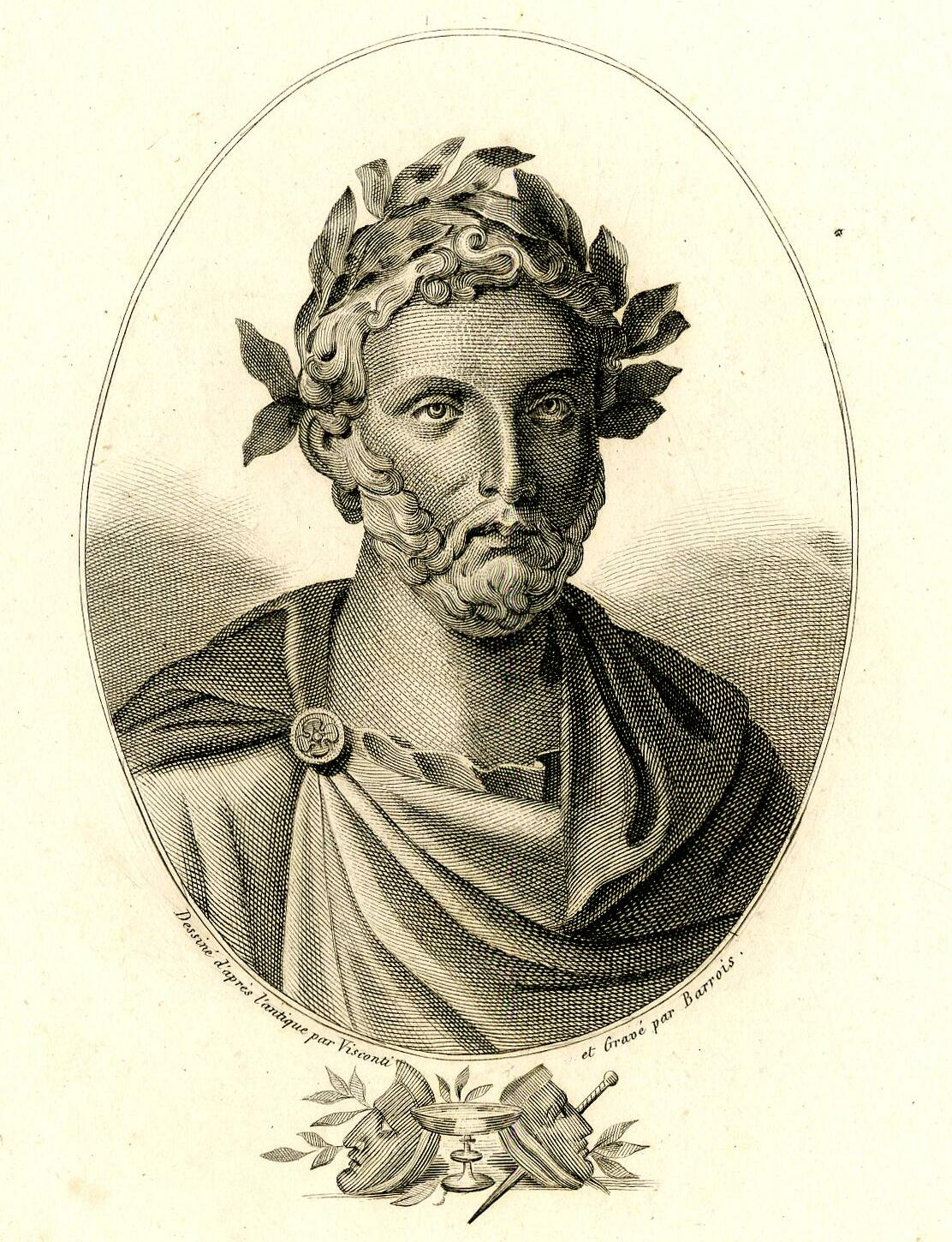
- Imaginary 18th-century portrait
- Born: c. 254 BC; Sarsina, Umbria, Roman Republic
- Died: 184 BC; Rome, Roman Republic
- Occupation: Playwright
- Writing career
- Language: Latin
- Period: Roman Republic
- Genre: Roman comedy

Titus Maccius Plautus (/ˈplɔːtəs/ PLAW-təs; c. 254 – 184 BC) was a Roman playwright of the Old Latin period. His comedies are the earliest Latin literary works to have survived in their entirety. He wrote Palliata comoedia, the genre devised by Livius Andronicus, the innovator of Latin literature. The word Plautine /ˈplɔːtaɪn/ (PLAW-tyne) refers to both Plautus's own works and works similar to or influenced by his. He influenced some of the greatest figures in literature, including Shakespeare and Molière (The Miser is partly modeled after Plautus's Aulularia).

== Biography ==
Not much is known about Plautus's early life. It is believed that he was born in Sarsina, a small town in what is now Emilia-Romagna in northern Italy (in the ancient region of Umbria, larger than the modern administrative division of Italy), around 254 BC. According to Morris Marples, Plautus worked as a stage-carpenter or scene-shifter in his early years. It is from this work, perhaps, that his love of the theater originated. His acting talent was eventually discovered; and he adopted the nomen "Maccius" (from Maccus, a clownish stock character in Atellan Farce) and agnomen "Plautus" ("trampled flat", usually in reference to "flat-footed" but sometimes intending "flat-eared" like the ears of a hound). Tradition holds that he made enough money to go into the nautical business, but that the venture collapsed. He is then said to have worked as a manual laborer and to have studied Greek drama—particularly the New Comedy of Menander—in his leisure. His studies allowed him to write his plays, which were released between c. 205 and 184 BC. Plautus attained such popularity that his name alone became a hallmark of theatrical success.

Plautus's comedies are mostly adapted from Greek models for a Roman audience, and are often based directly on the works of the Greek playwrights. He reworked the Greek texts to give them a flavour that would appeal to the local Roman audiences. They are the earliest surviving intact works in Latin literature.

Plautus's epitaph read:

postquam est mortem aptus Plautus, Comoedia luget,
scaena deserta, dein risus, ludus iocusque
et numeri innumeri simul omnes conlacrimarunt.

Since Plautus is dead, Comedy mourns,
The stage is deserted; then Laughter, Jest and Wit,
And all Melody's countless numbers wept together.

== Surviving plays ==
- Amphitruo (missing a large segment towards end)

The play is set in Thebes in Greece. While the general, Amphitruo, is away fighting a war, the god Jupiter visits his house and sleeps with his wife Alcumena, disguising himself as her husband. Jupiter's son Mercury, disguised as Amphitruo's slave Sosia, keeps watch outside, and when the real Sosia turns up bringing news of the victory, Mercury teases him and beats him up. When Amphitruo turns up, Alcumena is surprised to see him back so soon. There is a quarrel and Amphitruo accuses her of adultery. He goes off to fetch a witness. Then Jupiter comes back for a second session with Alcumena, and when Amphitruo returns, Mercury, still disguised as Sosia, climbs on the roof and mischievously pelts him with tiles. (There is a gap in the manuscripts here.) Amphitruo, infuriated, is about to burst into the house and kill everybody, when suddenly there is a thunderclap; a nurse comes out and reports that Alcumena has given birth miraculously to two boys (one of them Hercules). Finally Jupiter appears and explains everything to Amphitruo.

- Asinaria ("The Comedy of Asses")

Demaenetus, an Athenian gentleman, tells his slave Libanus that he knows his son Argyrippus is in love with a prostitute, Philaenium, but has no money to pay for her. He asks the cunning Libanus to find the money by cheating his wealthy wife Artemona or her steward Saurea. Libanus is at a loss for a plan until his fellow slave, Leonida, by chance meets a stranger who has come to pay a debt to Saurea for some donkeys which had earlier been sold to a certain merchant. Leonida pretends to be Saurea, and he and Libanus gull the stranger into handing the money over to Leonida. The money is given to Argyrippus but with the stipulation that his father is to be allowed to spend the first night with Philaenium. But a rival lover, Diabolus, who wants Philaenium for himself, and arrives too late with his money, out of jealousy asks his parasite (hanger on) to inform Artemona what is going on. She storms to the brothel in a fury and drags her husband away to his great embarrassment, leaving Argyrippus to enjoy Philaenium by himself.

- Aulularia ("The Pot of Gold") (missing ending)

A miserly old man, Euclio, has found a pot (aula) of gold in his house, and keeps checking that no one has stolen it. His wealthy neighbour Megadorus comes to ask for the hand of Euclio's daughter Phaedrium, unaware that she was earlier raped and is heavily pregnant. Soon Megadorus's slave Strobilus arrives with two hired cooks to prepare a wedding feast; he instructs one of the cooks, Congrio, to go to Euclio's house and start work. When Euclio returns he is alarmed, thinking his gold is being stolen, and he chases Congrio out into the street. Euclio decides to hide the pot first in a neighbouring temple, and later in a grove outside the city, but he is spied on each time by a slave of Megadorus's nephew Lyconides. Euclio is horrified to find that his gold has been stolen despite his precautions. At this point Lyconides confesses to Euclio that he raped Phaedrium and wishes to marry her. Later Lyconides discovers that it was his slave who stole the gold, and he insists that it must be returned. (The manuscript breaks off here, but from the ancient summary it seems that Lyconides returned the gold to Euclio, who consented to the marriage and gave him the gold as a dowry.)

- Bacchides ("The Bacchis Sisters")

(The first few scenes of the play are missing.) The young man Mnesilochus is in love with a courtesan called Bacchis. While he is abroad, his friend Pistoclerus falls in love with Bacchis's twin sister, also called Bacchis. Mnesilochus returns from his two-year stay in Ephesus, where he had been sent by his father Nicobulus to collect some money. Mnesilochus's cunning slave Chrysalus deceives Nicobulus into thinking that part of the money is still in Ephesus; in this way Mnesilochus will be able to keep some of the money to pay for Bacchis's services. But when Mnesilochus hears that Pistoclerus has a girlfriend called Bacchis, in his anger he gives all the money to his father, keeping none back. Too late, he learns from Pistoclerus that there are two Bacchises. He begs Chrysalus to play another trick on his father to get the money he needs. Chrysalus tells Nicobulus that Mnesilochus has been making love to the wife of a soldier called Cleomachus who is threatening to kill Mnesilochus. To protect his son, Nicobulus willingly promises to pay 200 gold pieces. Later, in yet another deception, Chrysalus persuades Nicobulus to pay another 200 gold pieces to prevent his son committing perjury. But shortly afterwards when Nicobulus meets the soldier he learns that Bacchis is only a courtesan who owed the soldier money. Furious, Nicobulus and Pistoclerus's father Philoxenus go to the Bacchises' house to confront their sons; the two sisters come out and charm them and persuade them to come in and enjoy the party.

- Captivi ("The Captives")

The play is set in Aetolia in western Greece. An old man, Hegio, has been buying up prisoners-of-war from Elis in the hope of exchanging one of them for his own son, who has himself been captured in Elis. Among Hegio's captives are a young man, Philocrates, and his loyal slave Tyndarus, who have swapped identities so that Philocrates can go back to his family in Elis. The plan works, and Philocrates goes home. Meanwhile another Elian captive, Aristophontes, recognises Tyndarus and inadvertently informs Hegio what has happened. Tyndarus is sent to hard labour in a stone quarry. Later a parasite/hanger-on Ergasilus excitedly brings news that Hegio's son has arrived at the harbour. Philocrates arrives, together with Hegio's son, Philopolemus, bringing a run-away slave called Stalagmus. When Stalagmus is interrogated he reveals that Tyndarus is none other than Hegio's long-lost son whom Stalagmus had kidnapped and sold years before. Tyndarus is rescued from his punishment and reunited with his father.

- Casina

A father and son, Lysidamus and Euthynicus, are both in love with the beautiful Casina, a 16-year-old girl who was adopted into their family as a baby. The father sends his son abroad on a trip and plans for Casina to marry his farm-manager Olympio, so that he can use her as a mistress whenever he likes without his wife Cleostrata knowing. When Cleostrata discovers his intention, she plans for Casina to marry Euthynicus's servant Chalinus, to keep her safe until Euthynicus returns. When, after lots are drawn, her plan fails, she dresses up Chalinus as Casina and sends him into the bedroom of the neighbour's house where Lysidamus is planning to spend the night with Casina. The husband is exposed, and Casina is kept safe for Euthynicus's return.

- Cistellaria ("The Little Casket") (missing large segments)

A young courtesan, Selenium, is in love with her first and only lover, a wealthy young man called Alcesimarchus, who has promised to marry her. But she is distressed to hear that Alcesimarchus is now engaged to marry another girl. Selenium believes she is the daughter of the courtesan Melaenis, but in fact her birth mother is Phanostrata, the mother of Alcesimarchus's fiancée. By chance Melaenis overhears Phanostrata's slave, Lampadio, who had been ordered to expose Selenium as a baby, telling his mistress that he had found the old woman who had picked her up, and that he learnt that she had given the baby to be adopted by a courtesan called Melaenis. Melaenis immediately hurries off to fetch the recognition tokens which she has been keeping in a small casket (cistella). The casket is accidentally dropped in the street by the maid; it is found by Lampadio and shown to Phanostrata, who recognises the tokens. Alcesimarchus is now free to marry his beloved Selenium and all ends well.

- Curculio

Phaedromus is a young man in Epidaurus in Greece, who is in love with a girl Planesium owned by a pimp Cappadox. Lacking the money to purchase her, Phaedromus had sent Curculio, a "parasite" (hanger-on), to Caria to borrow money from a certain friend. When he returns, Curculio tells Phaedromus that the friend had no money, but that he, Curculio, had met a soldier called Therapontigonus, who had told him that he intended to buy Planesium for himself. Curculio had stolen the soldier's signet ring and hurried back to Epidaurus. Wearing a disguise and carrying his forged letter, he tricks the banker Lyso into paying the money to Cappadox, and so is able to purchase Planesium for Phaedromus. Planesium, however, recognises the ring as one that had once belonged to her father, and when the soldier arrives in Epidaurus he in turn recognises a ring which he had once given to her. Phaedromus is able to marry Planesium, and, because Planesium proves to be free-born, Cappadox is obliged to return the money that was paid for her.

- Epidicus

The slave Epidicus's young master Stratippocles returns from the war in Thebes, bringing a captive girl he has fallen in love with. He orders Epidicus to find 40 minae to pay for her. This alarms Epidicus, since earlier Stratippocles had made him find the money to buy a different girl, and Epidicus had done this by fooling Stratippocles's father Periphanes into believing that the girl was his daughter. Epidicus has an idea. He convinces Periphanes that Stratippocles is still in love with his music girl and has borrowed money to buy her. To prevent this, Epidicus suggests that Periphanes should buy the girl himself, and sell her to a certain army officer for a profit. Periphanes pays, but Epidicus brings him a different music-girl hired for the day and hands the money to Stratippocles. When the officer arrives he tells Periphanes it is not the same girl he wanted to buy. Now Philippa, a woman that Periphanes had raped years before, arrives, looking for her daughter who has been captured in the war. She and Periphanes recognise each other, but when he brings out the girl who Epidicus told him was their daughter, Philippa says it is not her. Epidicus is now in big trouble since he has fooled Periphanes twice. But by a lucky chance, when the captive arrives, Epidicus recognises her: she is Philippa's daughter. Periphanes is so delighted to have found his missing daughter that he forgives Epidicus and gives him his freedom.

- Menaechmi (The Brothers Menaechmus)

The play is set in Epidamnus in western Greece. The play opens when Peniculus, a "parasite", arrives at the house of Menaechmus hoping to be given dinner. Menaechmus comes out, quarrelling with his shrewish wife. He tells Peniculus that he is going to give a cloak (actually his wife's) to his girlfriend the courtesan Erotium, who lives next door. They persuade Erotium to invite them to dinner, and while waiting they go to the forum for drink. Meanwhile Menaechmus's twin brother, also called Menaechmus, arrives from Syracuse with his slave Messenio, looking for his long-lost twin. Erotium greets him warmly, invites him in for dinner and afterwards gives him the cloak requesting it to be altered. A series of misunderstandings follows, during which the first Menaechmus gets tied up by his father-in-law and a doctor who think he has gone mad; he is rescued by Messenio. The two brothers finally meet. The first Menaechmus decides to auction off all his goods (including his wife) and return to Syracuse with his brother. Messenio claims his freedom for rescuing Menaechmus I.

- Mercator ("The Merchant")

Charinus, son of the Athenian merchant Demipho, met a beautiful girl called Pasicompsa in Rhodes and has brought her back to Athens. He intends to pretend that he has bought her as a maid for his mother. But his father catches sight of Pasicompsa at the port, and wants her for himself. He tells his son that Pasicompsa is too beautiful to be a maid, and insists she must be sold. He arranges for his friend Lysimachus to buy her and take her to his (Lysimachus's) house. But Lysimachus's wife returns unexpectedly from the country and when a cook turns up to prepare a feast there is a row. Lysimachus's son Eutychus, who is a friend of Charinus, learns from a maid that Pasicompsa is inside the house. He fetches Charinus, who was about to go abroad in despair, and brings him to rescue Pasicompsa. Afterwards Eutychus meets Lysimachus and Demipho and chastises Demipho for his disgraceful behaviour.

- Miles Gloriosus ("The Braggart Soldier")

The play is set in Ephesus. A boastful soldier, Pyrgopolynices, has abducted a courtesan, Philocomasium, from Athens. A resourceful slave, Palaestrio, has separately been captured and is now working in the same house. Palaestrio's former master, the young Athenian Pleusicles, is in love with Philocomasium and has come to Ephesus to rescue her; he is lodging next door with a jovial old bachelor called Periplectomenus. Palaestrio has made a hole in the wall between the houses so that Philocomasium can visit Pleusicles. Unfortunately the lovers are spotted by Sceledrus, one of the soldier's servants. Palaestrio comes up with a plan to pretend that the girl next door is Philocomasium's twin sister, and he and Periplectomenus have fun tricking not very bright Sceledrus while Philocomasium pops out first from one door then the other. Palaestrio now thinks up another plan. He gets a resourceful local courtesan Acroteleutium and her maid Milphidippa to pretend that Acroteleutium is the wealthy owner of the house next door, and that she is madly in love with the soldier. The plan works, and Pyrgopolynices orders Philocomasium to depart to make room for his new bride. But when he goes next door to claim his bride he is thoroughly beaten up by Periplectomenus's servants.

- Mostellaria ("The Ghost")

A young man, Philolaches, is in love with a courtesan Philematium, and in his father's absence has borrowed money to buy her. Suddenly, while he and his friend Callidamates are partying, his slave Tranio brings news of the father's return. Tranio ushers everyone inside the house and when the father, Theopropides, arrives, deceives him into thinking that the house is haunted by a ghost and cannot be entered. Next Tranio tricks the neighbour, Simo, into letting Theopropides inspect his house, which Theopropides has been told is for sale. While Tranio is off-stage, Theopropides meets two of Callidamates's slaves and realises that he has been tricked by Tranio. He is determined to punish him. But Callidamates appears and begs Theopropides to forgive both Philolaches and Tranio.

- Persa ("The Persian")

The cunning slave Toxilus, who is looking after his master's house while he is away, is in love with Lemniselenis, a courtesan owned by the pimp Dordalus, who lives next door. He persuades his friend Sagaristio, another cunning slave, to lend him the money needed to buy her, promising to get the money back from Dordalus by a trick. Meanwhile he persuades another friend, the parasite Saturio, to lend his daughter for the trick. Sagaristio dresses up as a Persian, and sells the girl to Dordalus for a large sum pretending she is an Arabian captive. Immediately afterwards Saturio comes to reclaim his daughter from Dordalus on the grounds that she is an Athenian citizen and drags him off to court. Since no guarantee was given at the time of the sale, the money does not have to be returned, and Toxilus and Sagaristio celebrate their victory.

- Poenulus ("The Little Carthaginian")

The play is set in Calydon in central Greece. A young man, Agorastocles, is in love with a slave-courtesan Adelphasium owned by a slave-dealer Lycus. He and his slave Milphio spot Adelphasium and her sister in the street and each try to win her over, but she rejects their overtures. Milphio suggests a plan to send Agorastocles's estate-manager Collybiscus to Lycus's house pretending to be a rich customer. Agorastocles brings some witnesses to observe Collybiscus taking a lot of money into the house. They trick Lycus into denying that any slave with money has come to the house, and Agorastocles threatens to take him to court. Lycus flees. Now a Carthaginian traveller comes to the town, speaking in Punic, looking for his two lost daughters, who had been captured in childhood by pirates. Hanno recognises Agorastocles from a monkey-bite scar as the son of his late cousin. He also discovers that Adelphasium and her sister are his daughters. There is a joyful reunion and Agorastocles declares that he will go back to Carthage with Hanno and the girls.

- Pseudolus

The young man Calidorus is distressed because his beloved, the slave-courtesan Phoenicium, has been sold to a Macedonian army officer. He is unable to find the 20 minae needed to buy her. The cunning slave Pseudolus promises to help. In the next scene, Phoenicium's owner, the slave-dealer Ballio, brings all his slaves and courtesans out into the street and berates them angrily, ordering them to prepare a feast for his birthday. Later, Pseudolus meets Calidorus's father Simo and bets him 20 minae that Phoenicium will be free by the end of the day. At this point Harpax, a servant of the officer, arrives bringing the balance of the money to be paid for Phoenicium. Pseudolus pretends to be Ballio's steward, and Harpax hands him a letter from the officer to Ballio. Now Pseudolus dresses up another cunning slave, Simio, as Harpax and sends him to meet Ballio. The plan works and Phoenicium is released. When the real Harpax returns, Simo and Ballio think that this just is one of Pseudolus's tricks and tease the boy lewdly. Too late, they realise that he is genuine. Ballio has to pay Simo the 20 minae he has bet that Pseudolus will not get the better of them, and Simo has to pay Pseudolus 20 minae, although Pseudolus, who by this time is very drunk, generously offers to return Simo half the money if he will attend a party with him.

- Rudens ("The Rope")

Two girls, Palaestra and Ampelisca, escape from the sea after a shipwreck off the coast of north Africa and seek refuge in a nearby temple of Venus. The young slave Trachalio, who is in love with Ampelisca, discovers them there. Now the slave-dealer Labrax, accompanied by his business-partner Charmides, who have also been shipwrecked, arrive. When he learns that the girls are in the temple, Labrax goes in to seize them. The girls are rescued by Trachalio, with the assistance of Daemones, who lives next door to the temple. Trachalio fetches his young master, Plesidippus, who is in love with Palaestra and has already paid Labrax a deposit to buy her. Plesidippus takes Labrax to court to sue him for fraud. In the second half of the play, Daemones's slave Gripus appears, dragging a basket which he has rescued from the sea. Trachalio finds him and, suspecting that the case contains Labrax's money and the tokens which will enable Palaestra to prove her identity, prevents him from stealing it by holding on to the rope by which Gripus is dragging the basket. Daemones is delighted to discover from the tokens that Palaestra is his own long-lost daughter. He forces Labrax to give Gripus the reward he had promised. Daemones uses the money to buy freedom for Gripus and Ampelisca, and invites everyone to dinner.

- Stichus

Two sisters, Philumena and Pamphila, are complaining that their husbands have been away for three years and their father is pressuring them to remarry. The father Antipho arrives and first asks their advice about his getting a new wife, then broaches the subject of their remarrying; but the sisters firmly refuse. When he has gone, Philumena sends for the parasite Gelasimus; she wants to send him to see if there is news of her husband's ship. Gelasimus arrives, but shortly afterwards a slave boy Pinacium also comes bringing news that the ship has arrived. Gelasimus tries to angle for a dinner invitation but is rebuffed. Philumena's husband Epignomus soon arrives with his slave Stichus: Stichus asks for a day's holiday, which is granted together with some wine to celebrate it. For the third time Gelasimus tries his luck for a dinner invitation, but is rebuffed. Now Pamphila's husband Pamphilippus arrives talking to Antipho, who hints that he would like to be given a music girl; the request is granted. Again Gelasimus angles for an invitation and is rebuffed. In the final part of the play Stichus and his friend Sangarinus celebrate Stichus's safe return with some food and drink and dancing, at which they are joined by their shared girlfriend Stephanium.

- Trinummus ("The Three Coins")

An Athenian gentleman, Megaronides, reproaches his friend Callicles for having purchased the house of his neighbour Charmides, who is away in Syria, for a cheap price. Callicles explains that he did this honourably since he wanted to protect the house and the treasure buried in it from the spendthrift habits of Charmides's son Lesbonicus. Meanwhile Lesbonicus's friend Lysiteles tells his father Philto that in order to help Lesbonicus he wishes to marry Charmides's daughter without a dowry. Philto goes to Lesbonicus to propose the match, but the plan is thwarted when Lesbonicus refuses to give away his sister without a dowry, as it would dishonour her. Callicles, when he learns this, consults his friend Megaronides, who advises him to use Charmides's buried treasure as a dowry. When Callicles says he does not want to tell Lesbonicus about the treasure in case he misuses it, Megaronides suggests they hire an imposter for three coins (Latin trinummus), dress him up and make him pretend that he has brought the money from Charmides in Syria. Charmides now arrives back and has an amusing conversation with the imposter. At first Charmides reproaches Callicles for buying the house but when Callicles explains everything, Charmides is delighted. Lysiteles is allowed to marry Charmides's daughter, and Lesbonicus is betrothed to Callicles's daughter.

- Truculentus ("The Churl")

A courtesan, Phronesium, has three lovers: Diniarchus, a young man from the city; Strabax, a young farmer; and Stratophanes, an army officer from the east. Diniarchus, returning from abroad, visits Phronesium but is not allowed to enter. It appears that Phronesium has found a baby and she is going to pretend that the baby is Stratophanes's child. Next the soldier Stratophanes arrives but the gifts he brings are not enough and he is refused admission. Diniarchus's cook Cyamus now arrives bringing gifts sent by his master, and the jealous Stratophanes quarrels with him. The farmer Strabax now arrives with money and is admitted. His slave Truculentus, who is following him to prevent him wasting his father's money, himself falls prey to the allurements of Phronesium's maid Astaphium. Now Diniarchus comes back, but since Phronesium is busy with Strabax, he is again refused admission, despite all the presents he had sent. At this moment an old gentleman called Callicles arrives, looking for the baby which his daughter had given birth to after being raped. Two slave-girls, threatened with punishment, inform him that the baby was given to Phronesium and that the father is Diniarchus. Diniarchus begs Callicles for forgiveness, and he offers to make amends by marrying the daughter. However, when he asks Phronesium for the baby, she asks to keep it for a while longer to continue her deception of Stratophanes. When Stratophanes comes he finds Strabax emerging from the house, and quarrels jealously with him, but, despite the fact that Stratophanes pays Phronesium a further huge sum of money, Strabax wins the day.

== Fragmentary plays ==
Only the titles and various fragments of these plays have survived.

- Acharistio
- Addictus ("The Devoted One")
- Ambroicus, or Agroicus ("The Rustic Man")
- Anus ("The Old Woman")
- Artamo ("The Mainsail")
- Astraba
- Baccharia
- Bis Compressa ("The Twice-Raped Woman")
- Boeotia ("Boeotia")
- Caecus ("The Blind Man"), or Praedones ("Plunderers")
- Calceolus ("The Little Shoe")
- Carbonaria ("The Charcoal-Burner")
- Clitellaria, or Astraba
- Colax ("The Flatterer")
- Commorientes ("Those Dying Together")
- Condalium ("The Slave Ring")
- Cornicularia
- Dyscolus ("The Grouch")
- Foeneratrix ("The Lady Moneylender")
- Fretum ("The Strait", or "Channel")
- Frivolaria ("Trifles")
- Fugitivi ("The Runaways"—possibly by Turpilius)
- Gastrion, or Gastron
- Hortulus ("Little Garden")
- Kakistus (possibly by Accius)
- Lenones Gemini ("The Twin Pimps")
- Nervolaria
- Parasitus Medicus ("The Parasite Physician")
- Parasitus Piger ("The Lazy Parasite"), or Lipargus
- Phagon ("The Glutton")
- Plociona
- Saturio
- Scytha Liturgus ("The Scythian Public Servant")
- Sitellitergus ("The Toilet Cleaner")
- Trigemini ("Triplets")
- Vidularia ("The Travelling Case")

== Manuscript tradition ==
The oldest manuscript of Plautus is a palimpsest, known as the Ambrosian palimpsest (A), since it is kept in the Ambrosian Library in Milan. It is thought to date to the 5th century, but it was not discovered until 1815. This manuscript is only partly legible, since the parchment was cleaned and a copy of the books of Kings and Chronicles was written on top. Parts of the text are completely missing (for example, nothing survives of Amphitruo, Asinaria, Aulularia, or of the first 475 lines of Bacchides), and other parts are barely legible. The most legible parts of A are found in the plays Persa, Poenulus, Pseudolus, and Stichus. Despite its fragmentary state, this palimpsest has proved very valuable in correcting the errors of P.

A second manuscript tradition is represented by manuscripts of the Palatine family, so called because two of its most important manuscripts were once kept in the library of the Elector Palatine in Heidelberg in Germany. The archetype of this family is now lost but it can be reconstructed from various later manuscripts, some of them containing either only the first half or the second half of the plays. The most important manuscript of this group is "B", of the 10th or early 11th century, now kept in the Vatican library. Manuscripts C and D also belong to this family. The lost original P, from which all these manuscripts were copied, is ascribed by Lindsay to the 8th or 9th century. Because of certain errors which both A and the P family have in common, it is thought that they are not completely independent, but are both copies of a single manuscript dating to perhaps the 4th or 5th century AD.

At some stage the plays in the P family were divided into two halves, one containing Amphitruo to Epidicus (omitting Bacchides), and the other containing Bacchides and Menaechmi to Truculentus. The first eight plays are found in B, and the first three and part of Captivi are found in D. The last twelve plays are found in B, C, and D. In addition there was once a fragmentary manuscript called the Codex Turnebi (T), which was used by a French scholar called Turnèbe in the 16th century. Although this manuscript is now lost, some readings from it were preserved by Turnèbe himself, and others were recorded in the margins of a 16th-century edition discovered by Lindsay in the Bodleian Library in Oxford.

There are certain indications (for example, small gaps in the text where there appears to have been in a hole or lacuna in the parchment) that the original P manuscript was copied from an earlier manuscript with 19, 20 or 21 lines to the page, in other words it was a book very similar to A, which has 19 lines to the page, and probably it was about the same age. However, the order of plays in A is slightly different from that in the P family of manuscripts. The headings at the top of the scenes in A, containing character names, which were written in red ink, have been totally washed away, and those in the P family seem to be based on guesswork and so were also probably missing in an ancestor of the lost P codex. For this reason the names of some of the minor characters are not known.

== Historical context ==
The historical context within which Plautus wrote can be seen, to some extent, in his comments on contemporary events and persons. Plautus was a popular comedic playwright while Roman theatre was still in its infancy and still largely undeveloped. At the same time, the Roman Republic was expanding in power and influence.

=== Roman society deities ===
Plautus was sometimes accused of teaching the public indifference and mockery of the gods. Any character in his plays could be compared to a god. Whether to honour a character or to mock him, these references were demeaning to the gods. These references to the gods include a character comparing a mortal woman to a god, or saying he would rather be loved by a woman than by the gods. Pyrgopolynices from Miles Gloriosus (vs. 1265), in bragging about his long life, says he was born one day later than Jupiter. In Curculio, Phaedrome says "I am a god" when he first meets with Planesium. In Pseudolus, Jupiter is compared to Ballio the pimp. It is not uncommon, too, for a character to scorn the gods, as seen in Poenulus and Rudens.

Tolliver argues that drama both reflects and foreshadows social change. It is likely that there was already much skepticism about the gods in Plautus's era. Plautus did not make up or encourage irreverence to the gods, but reflected ideas of his time. The state controlled stage productions, and Plautus's plays would have been banned, had they been too risqué.

=== Second Punic War and Macedonian War ===
The Second Punic War occurred from 218 to 201 BC; its central event was Hannibal's invasion of Italy. M. Leigh has devoted an extensive chapter about Plautus and Hannibal in his 2004 book, Comedy and the Rise of Rome. He says that "the plays themselves contain occasional references to the fact that the state is at arms...". One good example is a piece of verse from the Miles Gloriosus, the composition date of which is not clear but which is often placed in the last decade of the 3rd century BC. A. F. West believes that this is inserted commentary on the Second Punic War. In his article "On a Patriotic Passage in the Miles Gloriosus of Plautus", he states that the war "engrossed the Romans more than all other public interests combined". The passage seems intended to rile up the audience, beginning with hostis tibi adesse, or "the foe is near at hand".

At the time, the general Scipio Africanus wanted to confront Hannibal, a plan "strongly favored by the plebs". Plautus apparently pushes for the plan to be approved by the senate, working his audience up with the thought of an enemy in close proximity and a call to outmaneuver him. Therefore, it is reasonable to say that Plautus, according to P. B. Harvey, was "willing to insert [into his plays] highly specific allusions comprehensible to the audience". M. Leigh writes in his chapter on Plautus and Hannibal that "the Plautus who emerges from this investigation is one whose comedies persistently touch the rawest nerves in the audience for whom he writes".

Later, coming off the heels of the conflict with Hannibal, Rome was preparing to embark on another military mission, this time in Greece. While they would eventually move on Philip V in the Second Macedonian War, there was considerable debate beforehand about the course Rome should take in this conflict. But starting this war would not be an easy task considering those recent struggles with Carthage—many Romans were too tired of conflict to think of embarking on another campaign. As W. M. Owens writes in his article "Plautus' Stichus and the Political Crisis of 200 B.C.", "There is evidence that antiwar feeling ran deep and persisted even after the war was approved." Owens contends that Plautus was attempting to match the complex mood of the Roman audience riding the victory of the Second Punic War but facing the beginning of a new conflict. For instance, the characters of the dutiful daughters and their father seem obsessed over the idea of officium, the duty one has to do what is right. Their speech is littered with words such as pietas and aequus, and they struggle to make their father fulfill his proper role. The stock parasite in this play, Gelasimus, has a patron-client relationship with this family and offers to do any job in order to make ends meet; Owens puts forward that Plautus is portraying the economic hardship many Roman citizens were experiencing due to the cost of war.

With the repetition of responsibility to the desperation of the lower class, Plautus establishes himself firmly on the side of the average Roman citizen. While he makes no specific reference to the possible war with Greece or the previous war (that might be too dangerous), he does seem to push the message that the government should take care of its own people before attempting any other military actions.

== Influences ==
=== Greek New Comedy ===
Greek New Comedy greatly differs from the plays of Aristophanes. The most notable difference, according to Dana F. Sutton, is that New Comedy, in comparison to Old Comedy, is "devoid of a serious political, social or intellectual content" and "could be performed in any number of social and political settings without risk of giving offense". The risk-taking for which Aristophanes is known is noticeably lacking in the New Comedy plays of Menander. Instead, there is much more of a focus on the home and the family unit—something that the Romans, including Plautus, could easily understand and adopt for themselves later in history.

=== Father–son relationships ===
One main theme of Greek New Comedy is the father–son relationship. For example, in Menander's Dis Exapaton there is a focus on the betrayal between age groups and friends. The father-son relationship is very strong and the son remains loyal to the father. The relationship is always a focus, even if it's not the focus of every action taken by the main characters. In Plautus, on the other hand, the focus is still on the relationship between father and son, but we see betrayal between the two men that wasn't seen in Menander. There is a focus on the proper conduct between a father and son that, apparently, was so important to Roman society at the time of Plautus.

This becomes the main difference and, also, similarity between Menander and Plautus. They both address "situations that tend to develop in the bosom of the family". Both authors, through their plays, reflect a patriarchal society in which the father-son relationship is essential to proper function and development of the household. It is no longer a political statement, as in Old Comedy, but a statement about household relations and proper behavior between a father and his son. But the attitudes on these relationships seem much different—a reflection of how the worlds of Menander and Plautus differed.

=== Farce ===
There are differences not just in how the father–son relationship is presented, but also in the way in which Menander and Plautus write their poetry. William S. Anderson discusses the believability of Menander versus the believability of Plautus and, in essence, says that Plautus's plays are much less believable than those plays of Menander because they seem to be such a farce in comparison. He addresses them as a reflection of Menander with some of Plautus's own contributions. Anderson argues there is unevenness in the poetry of Plautus that results in "incredulity and refusal of sympathy of the audience."

=== Prologues ===
The poetry of Menander and Plautus is best juxtaposed in their prologues. Robert B. Lloyd makes the point that "albeit the two prologues introduce plays whose plots are of essentially different types, they are almost identical in form..." He goes on to address the specific style of Plautus that differs so greatly from Menander. He says that the "verbosity of the Plautine prologues has often been commented upon and generally excused by the necessity of the Roman playwright to win his audience." However, in both Menander and Plautus, word play is essential to their comedy. Plautus might seem more verbose, but where he lacks in physical comedy he makes up for it with words, alliteration and paronomasia (punning). See also "jokes and wordplay" below.

Plautus is well known for his devotion to puns, especially when it comes to the names of his characters. In Miles Gloriosus, for instance, the female concubine's name, Philocomasium, translates to "lover of a good party"—which is quite apt when we learn about the tricks and wild ways of this prostitute.

=== Character ===
Plautus's characters—many of which seem to crop up in quite a few of his plays—also came from Greek stock, though they too received some Plautine innovations. Indeed, since Plautus was adapting these plays it would be difficult not to have the same kinds of characters—roles such as slaves, concubines, soldiers, and old men. By working with the characters that were already there but injecting his own creativity, as J. C. B. Lowe wrote in his article "Aspects of Plautus' Originality in the Asinaria", "Plautus could substantially modify the characterization, and thus the whole emphasis of a play."

==== The Clever Slave ====
One of the best examples of this method is the Plautine slave, a form that plays a major role in quite a few of Plautus's works. The "clever slave" in particular is a very strong character; he not only provides exposition and humor, but also often drives the plot in Plautus's plays. C. Stace argues that Plautus took the stock slave character from New Comedy in Greece and altered it for his own purposes. In New Comedy, he writes, "the slave is often not much more than a comedic turn, with the added purpose, perhaps, of exposition". This shows that there was precedent for this slave archetype, and obviously some of its old role continues in Plautus (the expository monologues, for instance). However, because Plautus found humor in slaves tricking their masters or comparing themselves to great heroes, he took the character a step further and created something distinct.

=== Understanding of Greek by Plautus's audience ===
Of the approximate 270 proper names in the surviving plays of Plautus, about 250 names are Greek. William M. Seaman proposes that these Greek names would have delivered a comic punch to the audience because of its basic understanding of the Greek language. This previous understanding of Greek language, Seaman suggests, comes from the "experience of Roman soldiers during the first and second Punic wars. Not only did men billeted in Greek areas have opportunity to learn sufficient Greek for the purpose of everyday conversation, but they were also able to see plays in the foreign tongue." Having an audience with knowledge of the Greek language, whether limited or more expanded, allowed Plautus more freedom to use Greek references and words. Also, by using his many Greek references and showing that his plays were originally Greek, "It is possible that Plautus was in a way a teacher of Greek literature, myth, art and philosophy; so too was he teaching something of the nature of Greek words to people, who, like himself, had recently come into closer contact with that foreign tongue and all its riches."

At the time of Plautus, Rome was expanding, and having much success in Greece. W. S. Anderson has commented that Plautus "is using and abusing Greek comedy to imply the superiority of Rome, in all its crude vitality, over the Greek world, which was now the political dependent of Rome, whose effete comic plots helped explain why the Greeks proved inadequate in the real world of the third and second centuries, in which the Romans exercised mastery".

=== Disputed originality ===
Plautus was known for the use of Greek style in his plays, as part of the tradition of the variation on a theme. This has been a point of contention among modern scholars. One argument states that Plautus writes with originality and creativity—the other, that Plautus is a copycat of Greek New Comedy and that he makes no original contribution to playwriting.

A single reading of the Miles Gloriosus leaves the reader with the notion that the names, place, and play are all Greek, but one must look beyond these superficial interpretations. W. S. Anderson would steer any reader away from the idea that Plautus's plays are somehow not his own or at least only his interpretation. Anderson says that, "Plautus homogenizes all the plays as vehicles for his special exploitation. Against the spirit of the Greek original, he engineers events at the end ... or alter[s] the situation to fit his expectations." Anderson's vehement reaction to the co-opting of Greek plays by Plautus seems to suggest that they are in no way like their originals were. It seems more likely that Plautus was just experimenting putting Roman ideas in Greek forms.

=== Contaminatio ===
One idea that is important to recognize is that of contaminatio, which refers to the mixing of elements of two or more source plays. Plautus, it seems, is quite open to this method of adaptation, and quite a few of his plots seem stitched together from different stories. One excellent example is his Bacchides and its supposed Greek predecessor, Menander's Dis Exapaton. The original Greek title translates as "The Man Deceiving Twice", yet the Plautine version has three tricks. V. Castellani commented that:

Plautus' attack on the genre whose material he pirated was, as already stated, fourfold. He deconstructed many of the Greek plays' finely constructed plots; he reduced some, exaggerated others of the nicely drawn characters of Menander and of Menander's contemporaries and followers into caricatures; he substituted for or superimposed upon the elegant humor of his models his own more vigorous, more simply ridiculous foolery in action, in statement, even in language.

By exploring ideas about Roman loyalty, Greek deceit, and differences in ethnicity, "Plautus in a sense surpassed his model." He was not content to rest solely on a loyal adaptation that, while amusing, was not new or engaging for Rome. Plautus took what he found but again made sure to expand, subtract, and modify. He seems to have followed the same path that Horace did, though Horace is much later, in that he is putting Roman ideas in Greek forms. He not only imitated the Greeks, but in fact distorted, cut up, and transformed the plays into something entirely Roman. In essence it is Greek theater colonized by Rome and its playwrights.

== Stagecraft ==
In Ancient Greece during the time of New Comedy, from which Plautus drew so much of his inspiration, there were permanent theaters that catered to the audience as well as the actor. The greatest playwrights of the day had quality facilities in which to present their work and, in a general sense, there was always enough public support to keep the theater running and successful. However, this was not the case in Rome during the time of the Republic, when Plautus wrote his plays. While there was public support for theater and people came to enjoy tragedy and comedy alike, no permanent theater existed in Rome until Pompey dedicated one in 55 BC in the Campus Martius.

The lack of a permanent space was a key factor in Roman theater and Plautine stagecraft. In their introduction to the Miles Gloriosus, Hammond, Mack and Moskalew say that "the Romans were acquainted with the Greek stone theater, but, because they believed drama to be a demoralizing influence, they had a strong aversion to the erection of permanent theaters". This worry rings true when considering the subject matter of Plautus's plays. The unreal becomes reality on stage in his work. T. J. Moore notes that, "all distinction between the play, production, and 'real life' has been obliterated [Plautus's play Curculio]". A place where social norms were upended was inherently suspect. The aristocracy was afraid of the power of the theater. It was merely by their good graces and unlimited resources that a temporary stage would have been built during specific festivals.

=== The importance of the ludi ===
Roman drama, specifically Plautine comedy, was acted out on stage during the ludi or festival games. In his discussion of the importance of the ludi Megalenses in early Roman theater, John Arthur Hanson says that this particular festival "provided more days for dramatic representations than any of the other regular festivals, and it is in connection with these ludi that the most definite and secure literary evidence for the site of scenic games has come down to us". Because the ludi were religious in nature, it was appropriate for the Romans to set up this temporary stage close to the temple of the deity being celebrated. S. M. Goldberg notes that "ludi were generally held within the precinct of the particular god being honored."

T. J. Moore notes that "seating in the temporary theaters where Plautus's plays were first performed was often insufficient for all those who wished to see the play, that the primary criterion for determining who was to stand and who could sit was social status". This is not to say that the lower classes did not see the plays; but they probably had to stand while watching. Plays were performed in public, for the public, with the most prominent members of the society in the forefront.

The wooden stages on which Plautus's plays appeared were shallow and long with three openings in respect to the scene-house. The stages were significantly smaller than any Greek structure familiar to modern scholars. Because theater was not a priority during Plautus's time, the structures were built and dismantled within a day. Even more practically, they were dismantled quickly due to their potential as fire-hazards.

=== Geography of the stage ===
Often the geography of the stage and more importantly the play matched the geography of the city so that the audience would be well oriented to the locale of the play. Moore says that, "references to Roman locales must have been stunning for they are not merely references to things Roman, but the most blatant possible reminders that the production occurs in the city of Rome". So, Plautus seems to have choreographed his plays somewhat true-to-life. To do this, he needed his characters to exit and enter to or from whatever area their social standing would befit.

Two scholars, V. J. Rosivach and N. E. Andrews, have made interesting observations about stagecraft in Plautus: V. J. Rosivach writes about identifying the side of the stage with both social status and geography. He says that, for example, "the house of the medicus lies offstage to the right. It would be in the forum or thereabouts that one would expect to find a medicus." Moreover, he says that characters that oppose one another always have to exit in opposite directions. In a slightly different vein, N.E. Andrews discusses the spatial semantics of Plautus; she has observed that even the different spaces of the stage are thematically charged. She states:

Plautus' Casina employs these conventional tragic correlations between male/outside and female/inside, but then inverts them in order to establish an even more complex relationship among genre, gender and dramatic space. In the Casina, the struggle for control between men and women ... is articulated by characters' efforts to control stage movement into and out of the house.

Andrews makes note of the fact that power struggle in the Casina is evident in the verbal comings and goings. The words of action and the way that they are said are important to stagecraft. The words denoting direction or action such as abeo ("I go off"), transeo ("I go over"), fores crepuerunt ("the doors creak"), or intus ("inside"), which signal any character's departure or entrance, are standard in the dialogue of Plautus's plays. These verbs of motion or phrases can be taken as Plautine stage directions since no overt stage directions are apparent. Often, though, in these interchanges of characters, there occurs the need to move on to the next act. Plautus then might use what is known as a "cover monologue". About this S. M. Goldberg notes that "it marks the passage of time less by its length than by its direct and immediate address to the audience and by its switch from senarii in the dialogue to iambic septenarii. The resulting shift of mood distracts and distorts our sense of passing time."

=== Relationship with the audience ===
The small stages had a significant effect on the stagecraft of ancient Roman theater. Because of this limited space, there was also limited movement. Greek theater allowed for grand gestures and extensive action to reach the audience members who were in the very back of the theater. However the Romans would have had to depend more on their voices than large physicality. There was not an orchestra available as there was for the Greeks and this is reflected in the notable lack of a chorus in Roman drama. The replacement character that acts as the chorus would in Greek drama is often called the "prologue".

Goldberg says that "these changes fostered a different relationship between actors and the space in which they performed and also between them and their audiences". Actors were thrust into much closer audience interaction. Because of this, a certain acting style became required that is more familiar to modern audiences. Because they would have been in such close proximity to the actors, ancient Roman audiences would have wanted attention and direct acknowledgement from the actors.

Because there was no orchestra, there was no space separating the audience from the stage. The audience could stand directly in front of the elevated wooden platform. This gave them the opportunity to look at the actors from a much different perspective. They would have seen every detail of the actor and heard every word he said. The audience member would have wanted that actor to speak directly to them.

=== Stock characters ===
Plautus's range of characters was created through his use of various techniques, but probably the most important is his use of stock characters and situations in his various plays. He incorporates the same stock characters constantly, especially when the character type is amusing to the audience. As Walter Juniper wrote, "Everything, including artistic characterization and consistency of characterization, were sacrificed to humor, and character portrayal remained only where it was necessary for the success of the plot and humor to have a persona who stayed in character, and where the persona by his portrayal contributed to humor."

For example, in Miles Gloriosus, the titular "braggart soldier" Pyrgopolynices only shows his vain and immodest side in the first act, while the parasite Artotrogus exaggerates Pyrgopolynices's achievements, creating more and more ludicrous claims that Pyrgopolynices agrees to without question. These two are perfect examples of the stock characters of the pompous soldier and the desperate parasite that appeared in Plautine comedies. In disposing of highly complex individuals, Plautus was supplying his audience with what it wanted, since "the audience to whose tastes Plautus catered was not interested in the character play," but instead wanted the broad and accessible humor offered by stock set-ups. The humor Plautus offered, such as "puns, word plays, distortions of meaning, or other forms of verbal humor he usually puts them in the mouths of characters belonging to the lower social ranks, to whose language and position these varieties of humorous technique are most suitable," matched well with the stable of characters.

==== The clever slave ====
In his article "The Intriguing Slave in Greek Comedy," Philip Harsh gives evidence to show that the clever slave is not an invention of Plautus. While previous critics such as A. W. Gomme believed that the slave was "[a] truly comic character, the devisor of ingenious schemes, the controller of events, the commanding officer of his young master and friends, is a creation of Latin comedy," and that Greek dramatists such as Menander did not use slaves in such a way that Plautus later did, Harsh refutes these beliefs by giving concrete examples of instances where a clever slave appeared in Greek comedy. For instance, in the works of Athenaeus, Alciphron, and Lucian there are deceptions that involve the aid of a slave, and in Menander's Dis Exapaton there was an elaborate deception executed by a clever slave that Plautus mirrors in his Bacchides. Evidence of clever slaves also appears in Menander's Thalis, Hypobolimaios, and from the papyrus fragment of his Perinthia. Harsh acknowledges that Gomme's statement was probably made before the discovery of many of the papyri that we now have. While it was not necessarily a Roman invention, Plautus did develop his own style of depicting the clever slave. With larger, more active roles, more verbal exaggeration and exuberance, the slave was moved by Plautus further into the front of the action. Because of the inversion of order created by a devious or witty slave, this stock character was perfect for achieving a humorous response and the traits of the character worked well for driving the plot forward.

==== The lustful old man ====
Another important Plautine stock character, discussed by K.C. Ryder, is the senex amator. A senex amator is classified as an old man who contracts a passion for a young girl and who, in varying degrees, attempts to satisfy this passion. In Plautus these men are Demaenetus (Asinaria), Philoxenus and Nicobulus (Bacchides), Demipho (Cistellaria), Lysidamus (Casina), Demipho (Mercator), and Antipho (Stichus). Periplectomenos (Miles Gloriosus) and Daemones (Rudens) are regarded as senes lepidi because they usually keep their feelings within a respectable limit. All of these characters have the same goal, to be with a younger woman, but all go about it in different ways, as Plautus could not be too redundant with his characters despite their already obvious similarities. What they have in common is the ridicule with which their attempts are viewed, the imagery that suggests that they are motivated largely by animal passion, the childish behavior, and the reversion to the love-language of their youth.

=== Female characters ===
In examining the female role designations of Plautus's plays, Z. M. Packman found that they are not as stable as their male counterparts: a senex will usually remain a senex for the duration of the play but designations like matrona, mulier, or uxor at times seem interchangeable. Most free adult women, married or widowed, appear in scene headings as mulier, simply translated as "woman". But in Plautus's Stichus the two young women are referred to as sorores, later mulieres, and then matronae, all of which have different meanings and connotations. Although there are these discrepancies, Packman tries to give a pattern to the female role designations of Plautus. Mulier is typically given to a woman of citizen class and of marriageable age or who has already been married. Unmarried citizen-class girls, regardless of sexual experience, were designated virgo. Ancilla was the term used for female household slaves, with Anus reserved for the elderly household slaves. A young woman who is unwed due to social status is usually referred to as meretrix or "courtesan". A lena, or adoptive mother, may be a woman who owns these girls.

=== Unnamed characters ===
Like Packman, George E. Duckworth uses the scene headings in the manuscripts to support his theory about unnamed Plautine characters. There are approximately 220 characters in the 20 plays of Plautus. Thirty are unnamed in both the scene headings and the text and there are about nine characters who are named in the ancient text but not in any modern one. This means that about 18% of the total number of characters in Plautus are nameless. Most of the very important characters have names while most of the unnamed characters are of less importance. However, there are some abnormalities—the main character in Casina is not mentioned by name anywhere in the text. In other instances, Plautus will give a name to a character that only has a few words or lines. One explanation is that some of the names have been lost over the years; and for the most part, major characters do have names.

== Language and style ==
=== Overview ===
Plautus wrote in a colloquial style far from the codified form of Latin that is found in Ovid or Virgil. This colloquial style is the everyday speech that Plautus would have been familiar with, yet that means that most students of Latin are unfamiliar with it. Adding to the unfamiliarity of Plautine language is the inconsistency of the irregularities that occur in the texts. In one of his studies, A. W. Hodgman noted that:

the statements that one meets with, that this or that form is "common," or "regular," in Plautus, are frequently misleading, or even incorrect, and are usually unsatisfying.... I have gained an increasing respect for the manuscript tradition, a growing belief that the irregularities are, after all, in a certain sense regular. The whole system of inflexion—and, I suspect, of syntax also and of versification—was less fixed and stable in Plautus's time than it became later.

=== Archaic features ===
The diction of Plautus, who used the colloquial speech of his own day, is distinctive and non-standard from the point of view of the later, classical period. M. Hammond, A. Mack, and W. Moskalew have noted in the introduction to their edition of the Miles Gloriosus that Plautus was "free from convention ... [and] sought to reproduce the easy tone of daily speech rather than the formal regularity of oratory or poetry. Hence, many of the irregularities which have troubled scribes and scholars perhaps merely reflect the everyday usages of the careless and untrained tongues which Plautus heard about him." Looking at the overall use of archaic forms in Plautus, one notes that they commonly occur in promises, agreements, threats, prologues, or speeches. Plautus's archaic forms are metrically convenient, but may also have had a stylistic effect on his original audience.

These forms are frequent and of too great a number for a complete list here, but some of the most noteworthy features which from the classical perspective will be considered irregular or obsolete are:

- the use of uncontracted forms of some verbs such as mavolo ("prefer") for later malo
- the use of the final -e of second person singular imperatives in verbs which in classical Latin lack it, e.g. dic(e) "say".
- the retention of -u- in place of the later -i- in words such as maxumus, proxumus, lacrumare etc. (see Latin spelling and pronunciation §Sonus medius), and of -vo- before r, s or t, where the use after ca. 150 BC would favour -ve- (as vostrum for later vestrum)
- the use of the -ier ending for the present passive and deponent infinitive (e.g. exsurgier for exsurgī)
- the forms of sum often joined to the preceding word, which is called prodelision (as bonumst "it's good" for bonum est "it is good")
- the dropping of the final -s of 2nd-person-singular verb forms and the final -e of the question-particle -ne when the two are joined (as viden? for videsne? "you see? you get it?")
- the retention of short -ŏ in noun endings in the second declension for later -ŭ
- the retention in many words of qu- instead of later c- (as in quom instead of cum)
- the use of the -āī genitive singular ending, disyllabic, besides -ae
- the retention of final -d after long vowel in the pronouns mēd, tēd, sēd (accusative and ablative, used before prevocalic words, forms without -d also occur)
- the occasional addition of a final -pte, -te, or -met to pronouns
- the use of -īs as an accusative plural and occasionally nominative plural ending.

These are the most common linguistic peculiarities (from the later perspective) in the plays of Plautus, some of them being also found in Terence, and noting them helps in the reading of his works and gives insight into early Roman language and interaction.

=== Means of expression ===
There are certain ways in which Plautus expressed himself in his plays, and these individual means of expression give a certain flair to his style of writing. The means of expression are not always specific to the writer, i.e., idiosyncratic, yet they are characteristic of the writer. Two examples of these characteristic means of expression are the use of proverbs and the use of Greek language in the plays of Plautus.

Plautus employed the use of proverbs in many of his plays. Proverbs would address a certain genre such as law, religion, medicine, trades, crafts, and seafaring. Plautus's proverbs and proverbial expressions number into the hundreds. They sometimes appear alone or interwoven within a speech. The most common appearance of proverbs in Plautus appears to be at the end of a soliloquy. Plautus does this for dramatic effect to emphasize a point.

Further interwoven into the plays of Plautus and just as common as the use of proverbs is the use of Greek within the texts of the plays. J. N. Hough suggests that Plautus's use of Greek is for artistic purposes and not simply because a Latin phrase will not fit the meter. Greek words are used when describing foods, oils, perfumes, etc. This is similar to the use of French terms in the English language such as garçon or rendezvous. These words give the language a French flair just as Greek did to the Latin-speaking Romans. Slaves or characters of low standing speak much of the Greek. One possible explanation for this is that many Roman slaves were foreigners of Greek origin.

Plautus would sometimes incorporate passages in other languages as well in places where it would suit his characters. A noteworthy example is the use of two prayers in Punic in Poenulus, spoken by the Carthaginian elder Hanno, which are significant to Semitic linguistics because they preserve the Carthaginian pronunciation of the vowels. Unlike Greek, Plautus most probably did not speak Punic himself, nor was the audience likely to understand it. The text of the prayers themselves was probably provided by a Carthaginian informant, and Plautus incorporated it to emphasize the authenticity and foreignness of Hanno's character.

=== Poetic devices ===
Plautus also used more technical means of expression in his plays. One tool that Plautus used for the expression of his servus callidus stock character was alliteration. Alliteration is the repetition of sounds in a sentence or clause; those sounds usually come at the beginning of words. In the Miles Gloriosus, the servus callidus is Palaestrio. As he speaks with the character, Periplectomenus, he uses a significant amount of alliteration in order to assert his cleverness and, therefore, his authority. Plautus uses phrases such as "falsiloquom, falsicum, falsiiurium" (MG l. 191). These words express the deep and respectable knowledge that Palaestrio has of the Latin language. Alliteration can also happen at the endings of words as well. For example, Palaestrio says, "linguam, perfidiam, malitiam atque audaciam, confidentiam, confirmitatem, fraudulentiam" (MG ll. 188–9). Also used, as seen above, is the technique of assonance, which is the repetition of similar-sounding syllables.

=== Jokes and wordplay ===
Plautus's comedies abound in puns and word play, which is an important component of his poetry. One well known instance in the Miles Gloriosus is Sceledre, scelus. Some examples stand in the text in order to accentuate and emphasize whatever is being said, and others to elevate the artistry of the language. But a great number are made for jokes, especially riddle jokes, which feature a "knock knock – who's there?" pattern. Plautus is especially fond of making up and changing the meaning of words, as Shakespeare does later.

=== Meter ===
Further emphasizing and elevating the artistry of the language of the plays of Plautus is the use of meter, which simply put is the rhythm of the play. There seems to be great debate over whether Plautus found favour in strong word accent or verse ictus, stress. Plautus did not follow the meter of the Greek originals that he adapted for the Roman audience. Plautus used a great number of meters, but most frequently he used the iambic senarius and the trochaic septenarius. G. B. Conte has noted that Plautus favours the use of cantica instead of Greek meters.

=== Vigor and immediacy ===
The servus callidus functions as the exposition in many of Plautus's plays. According to C. Stace, "slaves in Plautus account for almost twice as much monologue as any other character ... [and] this is a significant statistic; most of the monologues being, as they are, for purposes of humor, moralizing, or exposition of some kind, we can now begin to see the true nature of the slave's importance." Because humor, vulgarity, and "incongruity" are so much a part of the Plautine comedies, the slave becomes the essential tool to connect the audience to the joke through his monologue and direct connection to the audience. He is, then, not only a source for exposition and understanding, but connection—specifically, connection to the humor of the play, the playfulness of the play. The servus callidus is a character that, as McCarthy says, "draws the complete attention of the audience, and, according to C. Stace, 'despite his lies and abuse, claims our complete sympathy'". He does this, according to some scholarship, using monologue, the imperative mood and alliteration—all of which are specific and effective linguistic tools in both writing and speaking.

The specific type of monologue (or soliloquy) in which a Plautine slave engages is the prologue. As opposed to simple exposition, according to N. W. Slater, "these ... prologues ... have a far more important function than merely to provide information." Another way in which the servus callidus asserts his power over the play—specifically the other characters in the play—is through his use of the imperative mood. This type of language is used, according to Erich Segal, for "the forceful inversion, the reduction of the master to an abject position of supplication ... the master-as-suppliant is thus an extremely important feature of the Plautine comic finale". The imperative mood is therefore used in the complete role-reversal of the normal relationship between slave and master, and "those who enjoy authority and respect in the ordinary Roman world are unseated, ridiculed, while the lowliest members of society mount to their pedestals ... the humble are in fact exalted".

=== Food ===
Meat is the most commonly mentioned foodstuff in the plays of Plautus, and where a specific meat is mentioned, it is most commonly pork, followed by fish.

== Influence ==
Intellectual and academic critics have often judged Plautus's work as crude; yet his influence on later literature is impressive—especially on two literary giants, Shakespeare and Molière.

Playwrights throughout history have looked to Plautus for character, plot, humor, and other elements of comedy. His influence ranges from similarities in idea to full literal translations woven into plays. The playwright's apparent familiarity with the absurdity of humanity and both the comedy and tragedy that stem from this absurdity have inspired succeeding playwrights centuries after his death. The most famous of these successors is Shakespeare—Plautus had a major influence on his early comedies.

=== The Middle Ages and early Renaissance ===
Plautus was apparently read in the 9th century. His form was too complex to be fully understood, however, and, as indicated by the Terentius et delusor, it was unknown at the time if Plautus was writing in prose or verse.

W. B. Sedgwick has provided a record of the Amphitruo, perennially one of Plautus's most famous works. It was the most popular Plautine play in the Middle Ages, and publicly performed at the Renaissance; it was the first Plautine play to be translated into English.

The influence of Plautus's plays was felt in the early 16th century. Limited records suggest that the first known university production of Plautus in England was of Miles Gloriosus at Oxford in 1522–3. The magnum jornale of Queens College contains a reference to a comoedia Plauti in either 1522 or 1523. This fits directly with comments made in the poems of Leland about the date of the production. The next production of Miles Gloriosus that is known from limited records was given by the Westminster School in 1564. Other records also tell us about performances of the Menaechmi. From our knowledge, performances were given in the house of Cardinal Wolsey by boys of St. Paul's School as early as 1527.

=== Shakespeare ===
Shakespeare borrowed from Plautus as Plautus borrowed from his Greek models. According to C. L. Barber, "Shakespeare feeds Elizabethan life into the mill of Roman farce, life realized with his distinctively generous creativity, very different from Plautus' tough, narrow, resinous genius".

The Plautine and Shakespearean plays that most parallel each other are, respectively, the Menaechmi and The Comedy of Errors. According to Marples, Shakespeare drew directly from Plautus "parallels in plot, in incident, and in character", and was undeniably influenced by the classical playwright's work. H. A. Watt stresses the importance of recognizing the fact that the "two plays were written under conditions entirely different and served audiences as remote as the poles".

The differences between the Menaechmi and The Comedy of Errors are clear. In the Menaechmi, Plautus uses only one set of twins—twin brothers. Shakespeare, on the other hand, uses two sets of twins, which, according to William Connolly, "dilutes the force of [Shakespeare's] situations". One suggestion is that Shakespeare got this idea from Plautus's Amphitruo, in which both twin masters and twin slaves appear.

It can be noted that the doubling is a stock situation of Elizabethan comedy. On the fusion between Elizabethan and Plautine techniques, T. W. Baldwin writes: "[...] Errors does not have the miniature unity of Menaechmi, which is characteristic of classic structure for comedy". Baldwin notes that Shakespeare covers a much greater area in the structure of the play than Plautus does. Shakespeare was writing for an audience whose minds weren't restricted to house and home, but looked toward the greater world beyond and the role that they might play in that world.

Another difference between the audiences of Shakespeare and Plautus is that Shakespeare's audience was Christian. At the end of Errors, the world of the play is returned to normal when a Christian abbess interferes with the feuding. Menaechmi, on the other hand, "is almost completely lacking in a supernatural dimension". A character in Plautus's play would never blame an inconvenient situation on witchcraft—something that is quite common in Shakespeare.

The relationship between a master and a clever servant is also a common element in Elizabethan comedy. Shakespeare often includes foils for his characters to have one set off the other. In Elizabethan romantic comedy, it is common for the plays to end with multiple marriages and couplings of pairs. This is something that is not seen in Plautine comedy. In the Comedy of Errors, Aegeon and Aemilia are separated, Antipholus and Adriana are at odds, and Antipholus and Luciana have not yet met. At the end, all the couples are happily together. By writing his comedies in a combination of Elizabethan and Plautine styles, Shakespeare helps to create his own brand of comedy, one that uses both styles.

Also, Shakespeare uses the same kind of opening monologue so common in Plautus's plays. He even uses a "villain" in The Comedy of Errors of the same type as the one in Menaechmi, switching the character from a doctor to a teacher but keeping the character a shrewd, educated man. Watt also notes that some of these elements appear in many of his works, such as Twelfth Night or A Midsummer Night's Dream, and had a deep impact on Shakespeare's writing.

Later playwrights also borrowed Plautus's stock characters. One of the most important echoes of Plautus is the stock character of the parasite. The best example of this is Falstaff, Shakespeare's portly and cowardly knight. As J. W. Draper notes, the gluttonous Falstaff shares many characteristics with a parasite such as Artotrogus from Miles Gloriosus. Both characters seem fixated on food and where their next meal is coming from. But they also rely on flattery in order to gain these gifts, and both characters are willing to bury their patrons in empty praise. Draper notes that Falstaff is also something of a boastful military man, but says: "Falstaff is so complex a character that he may well be, in effect, a combination of interlocking types".

As well as appearing in Shakespearean comedy, the Plautine parasite appears in one of the first English comedies. In Ralph Roister Doister, the character of Matthew Merrygreeke follows in the tradition of both Plautine parasite and Plautine slave, as he both searches and grovels for food and also attempts to achieve his master's desires. Indeed, the play itself is often seen as borrowing heavily from or even being based on the Plautine comedy Miles Gloriosus.

H. W. Cole discusses the influence of Plautus and Terence on the Stonyhurst Pageants. The Stonyhurst Pageants are manuscripts of Old Testament plays that were probably composed after 1609 in Lancashire. Cole focuses on Plautus's influence on the particular Pageant of Naaman. The playwright of this pageant breaks away from the traditional style of religious medieval drama and relies heavily on the works of Plautus. Overall, the playwright cross-references eighteen of the twenty surviving plays of Plautus and five of the six extant plays by Terence. It is clear that the author of the Stonyhurst Pageant of Naaman had a great knowledge of Plautus and was significantly influenced by this.

There is evidence of Plautine imitation in Edwardes's Damon and Pythias and Heywood's Silver Age as well as in Shakespeare's Errors. Heywood sometimes translated whole passages of Plautus. By being translated as well as imitated, Plautus was a major influence on comedy of the Elizabethan era. In terms of plot, or perhaps more accurately plot device, Plautus served as a source of inspiration and also provided the possibility of adaptation for later playwrights.

=== Molière ===
Molière is no less inspired, openly drawing for instance from the eloquence of Palaestrio in Miles Gloriosus for the quick-witted servants and maids of The Miser and The Blunderer: the same schemes, the same ruses that sustain the momentum and drive the plays toward their resolution.

The many deceits that Plautus layered his plays with, giving the audience the feeling of a genre bordering on farce, appear in much of the comedy written by Shakespeare and Molière. For instance, the clever slave has important roles in both L'Avare and L'Etourdi, two plays by Molière, and in both drives the plot and creates the ruse just like Palaestrio in Miles Gloriosus. These similar characters set up the same kind of deceptions in which many of Plautus's plays find their driving force, which is not a simple coincidence.

For The Miser, Molière directly draws from Aulularia, adopting the same plot (a stolen sum of money) while Harpagon mirrors the character of Euclio. Their words are nearly identical: "Quo curram? quo non curram?" (line 713, "Where shall I run? Where shall I not run?") becomes "Où courir? Où ne pas courir?" (Act IV, Scene 7).

=== Later periods ===
20th century musicals based on Plautus include A Funny Thing Happened on the Way to the Forum (Larry Gelbart and Burt Shevelove, book, Stephen Sondheim, music and lyrics).

Roman Laughter: The Comedy of Plautus, a 1968 book by Erich Segal, is a scholarly study of Plautus's work.

The British TV sitcom Up Pompeii! uses situations and stock characters from Plautus's plays. In the first series Willie Rushton plays Plautus who pops up on occasion to provide comic comments on what is going on in the episode.

== Editions ==
- T. Macci Plauti Comoediae ex recensione Georgii Goetz et Friderici Schoell, 7 voll., Lipsiae, in aedibus B. G. Teubneri, 1893–6: voll. 1-4 (1909 re-edition), voll. 5–7.
- Plautus (2007). The Rope and Other Plays. Penguin. ISBN 9780141937915.
- Plautus (2004). The Pot of Gold and Other Plays. Penguin. ISBN 9780141911229.
- Richlin, Amy (2005). Rome and the Mysterious Orient: Three Plays by Plautus. University of California Press.

== See also ==
- A Funny Thing Happened on the Way to the Forum
- Glossarium Eroticum
- History of theatre
- Menander
- Molière
- Prosody (Latin)
- Second Punic War
- Shakespeare
- Terence
- Theatre of ancient Rome
