= Maureen Anderman =

American actress

- Years active: 1974-2010
- Spouse: Frank Converse (1982-present)
- Children: 2

Maureen Anderman is a retired American actress best known for her work on the stage. She has appeared in eighteen Broadway shows over the last four decades earning several Drama Desk Award and Tony Award nominations.

== Career ==
Anderman made her Broadway debut as Bianca in the 1970 revival of Othello. Two years later she won a Theater World Award for her portrayal of Ruth in Moonchildren. In 1975 she was nominated for a Drama Desk Award for her performance of Sarah in Edward Albee's Seascape. Her other Broadway credits during the 1970s include An Evening With Richard Nixon and... (1972), The Last of Mrs. Lincoln (1973), Hamlet (1975), and Who's Afraid of Virginia Woolf? (1976). She began working in television during the 1970s, appearing in guest roles on television series such as Kojak (1976) and The Andros Targets (1977), as well as numerous TV movies.

In 1980, Anderman was nominated for a Tony Award for her portrayal of Carol in The Lady from Dubuque. She remained active on Broadway throughout the 1980s appearing in The Man Who Came to Dinner (1980), Macbeth (1981), You Can't Take It with You (1983–1984), Benefactors (1985–1986), and Social Security (1987).

She remained active in television appearing on several programs, including Another World, Search for Tomorrow (where she played evil manager, Sylvie DesCartes), St. Elsewhere, The Days and Nights of Molly Dodd, and The Equalizer. She also starred in the 1983 film adaptation of Erich Segal's Man, Woman and Child.

Anderman's career slowed down during the 1990s as she chose to focus on her family. She did, however, appear in episodes of One Life to Live (as Nora Hanen's psychiatrist sister, Susannah Hanen, 1995), Law & Order and Homicide: Life on the Street (in the crossover episode, "Baby, It's You," as the evil Gayle Janaway, 1997), and Law & Order: Criminal Intent (2003). She appeared in the film Final (2001). In 2007, Anderman returned to Broadway as the cover artist for Vanessa Redgrave in The Year of Magical Thinking.

Throughout her career Anderman has been active in Off-Broadway and regional theater productions. Off Broadway she appeared in Passion Play and Kenneth Lonergan's The Waverly Gallery among others. Her regional credits include Third, Rabbit Hole and The Sisters Rosensweig (Huntington Theatre), The Waverly Gallery (Williamstown Theatre Festival); First Lady (Yale Repertory Theatre); Listening, Moon for the Misbegotten, Tartuffe (Hartford Stage), Betrayal (Long Wharf Theatre), and Noël Coward in Two Keys (Berkshire Theatre Festival), among many others.

== Personal life ==
Anderman is married to actor Frank Converse. They have two children.

== Filmography ==
=== Film ===
Year	Title	Role	Notes
1979	The Seduction of Joe Tynan	Joe's Secretary	
1983	Man, Woman and Child	Margo	
2001	Final	Supervisor	
2014	NOW: In the Wings on a World Stage	Duchess of York	

=== Television ===
Year	Title	Role	Notes
1976	The Adams Chronicles	Mary Cathering Hellen	2 episodes
1976	Kojak	Assistant D.A. Lockman	Episode: "Where Do You Go When You Have Nowhere to Go?"
1977	The Andros Targets	Arlene Mandel	Episode: "The Treatment Succeeded But the Patient Died"
1978, 1984	Great Performances	Alice Sycamore	2 episodes
1980	Once Upon a Family	Janet Demerjian	Television film
1980	King Crab	Betty	Television film
1980	Another World	Lady Belton	2 episodes
1981	Every Stray Dog and Kid	Writer	Television film
1981	Search for Tomorrow	Sylvie Descartes	9 episodes
1982	Nurse	Dr. Lydia Stevens	Episode: "Hands of Gold"
1982	The Devlin Connection	Arlene	Episode: "Of Nuns and Other Black Birds"
1982	St. Elsewhere	Denise Whitehill	Episode: "Down's Syndrome"
1982	Macbeth	Lady Macbeth	Television film
1983	Cocaine and Blue Eyes	Lilian Anatole	Television film
1985	Spenser: For Hire	Ellen	Episode: "Blood Money"
1985	The Equalizer	Eleanor Griffith	Episode: "The Lock Box"
1986	ABC Afterschool Special	Mrs. Bixby	Episode: "Getting Even: A Wimp's Revenge"
1986	As the World Turns	Dr. Audrey Samuels	2 episodes
1987–1988	The Equalizer	Pete O'Phelan	8 episodes "Christmas Presence" (S3.E11) "A Dance on the Dark Side" (S3.E12) "Video Games" (S3.E14) "Last Call" (S3.E19) "Regrets Only" (S3.E20) "Target of Choice" (S3.E21) "Always a Lady" (S3.E22) "The Last Campaign" (S4.E1)
1987–1991	The Days and Nights of Molly Dodd	Nina Shapiro	15 episodes
1992, 1997	Law & Order	Gayle Janaway / Sharon Styger	2 episodes
1995	One Life to Live	Susannah Hanen	Episode #1.6996
1997	Homicide: Life on the Street	Gayle Janaway	Episode: "Baby, It's You"
2003	Law & Order: Criminal Intent	Abigail	Episode: "Undaunted Mettle"
