= Reeling =

Reeling may refer to

- Silk reeling
- "The Reeling", a song by American electronic band Passion Pit
- Reeling (book), a film review book by Pauline Kael
- Reeling with PJ Harvey, a video album
- Reeling (album), a 2022 album by British alternative rock band the Mysterines
- Reel (dance), a type of folk dance

== See also ==
- Reelin', a song by \Matt Corby
