= Terentius et delusor =

Terentius et delusor is an anonymous poetical treatise, variously described as a dialogue or spoken play, preserved only in fragments in a twelfth-century manuscript. It is the earliest example of the author or presenter of a play appearing as a person in the work, and in this case both appear: Terence and the (critical) theatrical producer (persona delusoris). The poem was probably acted or recited before a performance of one of Terence's works. It has been dated to the fifth century, the seventh, between the seventh and eleventh, the ninth or tenth century, and the Carolingian Renaissance (ninth century). The piece often finds mention beside Roswitha, who composed Christian dramas in Terentian style.

The plot of the brief performance piece is that the producer criticises Terence's plays as boring and out of style. Terence then proceeds to defend his work, probably ultimately submitting it to the judgement of the audience, who then viewed a performance of one of his plays. The play was probably mimed while the Terence character recited it, "in the manner thought to be characteristic of actual Roman performances." The short piece testifies, however, to the lack of certainty about ancient practice. An sit prosaicum nescio an metricum says the producer about the drama of Plautus: "we do not know whether they may be prose or meter."

Terentius et delusor was given its first modern edition, with annotations, by Charles Magnin in the Bibliothèque de l'École des Chartes (vol. 1:1839–40, pp. 517–535), where he titled it "Fragment d'un comique inédit du septième siècle" (Fragment of an unedited comedy of the seventh century). Next, Paul von Winterfeld edited the poem for Hrotsvithae Opera, xx–xxiii, in MGH SS rerum Germanicarum (Berlin: 1902). An updated version was made by Karl Strecker for MGH, Poetae Latini aevi Carolini, IV, 1088–90, in 1923 and for Hrotsvithae Opera in 1930. It has since appeared (without translation) in Appendix V, 326–328, of volume II of E. K. Chambers' The Medieval Stage.

== Sources ==
- Chambers, Edmund Kerchever (1903). The Mediaeval Stage, 2 vols. Oxford. ISBN 0-486-29229-0.
- Dronke, Peter (1984). Women Writers of the Middle Ages: A Critical Study of Texts from Perpetua (+203) to Marguerite Porete (+1310). Cambridge: Cambridge University Press.
- Dronke, Peter, ed. and trans. (1994). Nine Medieval Latin Plays. Cambridge Medieval Classics I. Cambridge: Cambridge University Press. ISBN 0-521-39537-2.
- Segal, Erich (2001). The Death of Comedy. Harvard University Press. ISBN 0-674-01247-X.
- Tydeman, William (1978). The Theatre in the Middle Ages: Western European Stage Conditions c. 800–1576. Cambridge: Cambridge University Press.
- Manso, Francisco Nodar (1990). Teatro Menor Galaico-Portugués (Siglo XIII): Reconstrucción Contextual y Teoría del Discurso. Edition Reichenberger. ISBN 3-923593-95-3.
- Menéndez y Pelayo, Marcelino. La Celestina: Razones para tratar de esta obra dramática en la historia de la novela española. Buenos Aires: Espasa-Calpe, 1947.
- Ogilvy, J. D. A. (1963). "Mimi, Scurrae, Histriones: Entertainers of the Early Middle Ages." Speculum, 38:4 (October), pp. 603–619.
