= Rafferty and the Gold Dust Twins =

1975 film by Dick Richards

- Theatrical release poster
- Directed by: Dick Richards
- Written by: John Kaye
- Produced by: Art Linson; Michael Gruskoff
- Starring: Sally Kellerman; Mackenzie Phillips; Alan Arkin; Harry Dean Stanton
- Cinematography: Ralph Woolsey
- Edited by: Walter Thompson
- Music by: Artie Butler
- Distributed by: Warner Bros. Pictures
- Release date: February 2, 1975
- Running time: 91 minutes
- Country: United States
- Language: English

Rafferty and the Gold Dust Twins is a 1975 American comedy-drama film directed by Dick Richards and written by John Kaye. The film was the second film credit for Jerry Bruckheimer, who was an associate producer.

== Plot ==
Idiotic, alcoholic driving instructor and former Marine Corps sergeant Rafferty lives in poverty near Hollywood, California. He allows two young female hitchhikers, who are seeking to reach New Orleans (as one of them is an aspiring singer), to kidnap him. He eventually enjoys their company, and the three take a road trip to Las Vegas and end up in Tucson, Arizona, with many misadventures and scams to finance their trip along the way.

== Cast ==
- Sally Kellerman as McKinley Beachwood, a.k.a. "Mac"
- Mackenzie Phillips as Rita Sykes, a.k.a. "Frisbee"
- Alan Arkin as "Gunny" Rafferty
- Alex Rocco as Vinnie
- Charles Martin Smith as Alan Boone
- Harry Dean Stanton as Billy Winston
- John McLiam as John Beachwood
- Richard Hale as The Jesus Freak
- Louis Prima as Himself
- Lauren Stocks as School
- Earl W. Smith as Johnny Young

== Release ==
This film was released in the UK on 20 March 1977 as a double bill with Michael Apted's cult film The Squeeze.

NBC purchased the television rights and changed the film's title to Rafferty and the Highway Hustlers.

Warner Paperback Library published a novelization of John Kaye's screenplay by Lillian Roberts. The blurb on the front cover read, "An ex-marine kidnapped by a 6-foot hunk of woman and a "Lolita" with a gun."

The film was released on Blu-ray by Warner Archive Collection October 14, 2025, this without ever having a standard DVD release.

== Critical reception ==
The film received mixed reviews from critics. Richard F. Shepard of The New York Times stated: Rafferty and the Gold Dust Twins passes the time pleasantly enough...several belly laughs and lots of chuckles.

On the review aggregator website Rotten Tomatoes, 52% of 42 critics' reviews are positive. The website's consensus reads: "Rafferty and the Gold Dust Twins offers charming performances, especially from Alan Arkin, but its thin narrative and heavy-handed direction fail to deliver on the promise of its comedic potential."

== See also ==
- List of American films of 1975
