= Final (film) =

2001 film by Campbell Scott

- Directed by: Campbell Scott
- Written by: Bruce McIntosh
- Screenplay by: Bruce McIntosh
- Starring: Denis Leary; Hope Davis; J. C. MacKenzie; Jim Gaffigan; Jim Hornyak; Maureen Anderman
- Cinematography: Dan Gillham
- Edited by: Andy Keir
- Music by: Guy Davis
- Production company: Independent Film Channel
- Distributed by: Lions Gate Films; Cowboy Pictures
- Release date: December 7, 2001
- Running time: 111 minutes
- Country: United States
- Language: English

Final is a 2001 science fiction film directed by Campbell Scott. It stars Denis Leary, Hope Davis, J. C. MacKenzie, Jim Gaffigan, Jim Hornyak, and Maureen Anderman. Earl Hindman also starred in the film, and this was his final film role prior to his death two years later, in 2003.

== Plot ==
Bill wakes up from a coma in a psychiatric hospital, suffering from delusions that he is about to be executed by a futuristic society which has unfrozen him from a past experiment in cryonics and tissue regeneration. Under the care of Ann, his psychiatrist, he starts remembering trauma from his pre-coma life, including the death of his father, a breakup with his fiancee, and a drunken binge while driving. He begins to recover from his mental breakdown, yet his delusions do not cease. As the truth unravels, he discovers that his delusions may be closer to the truth than the reality he was told of by his caregivers.
