= Man, Woman and Child (film) =

1982 film by Dick Richards

- Theatrical release poster
- Directed by: Dick Richards
- Screenplay by: Erich Segal; David Zelag Goodman
- Based on: Man, Woman and Child by Erich Segal
- Produced by: Stanley Beck; Elliott Kastner; Elmo Williams
- Starring: Martin Sheen; Blythe Danner; Craig T. Nelson; David Hemmings
- Cinematography: Richard H. Kline
- Edited by: David Bretherton
- Music by: Georges Delerue; Buddy Kaye
- Production company: Gaylord Productions
- Distributed by: Paramount Pictures (United States and Canada); Columbia Pictures (International)
- Release date: April 1, 1983
- Running time: 100 minutes
- Country: United States
- Language: English
- Box office: $2,314,561

Man, Woman and Child is a 1983 American drama film directed by Dick Richards and written by Erich Segal and David Zelag Goodman. The film is based on Erich Segal's 1980 novel of the same name. The film stars Martin Sheen, Blythe Danner, Craig T. Nelson, David Hemmings, Nathalie Nell and Maureen Anderman. The film was released on April 1, 1983, by Paramount Pictures. The Bollywood film Masoom is an unauthorised remake of Man, Woman and Child.

== Plot ==
Robert Beckwith is a sensitive, intelligent family man who, in a brief affair long past, fathered Jean-Claude Guerin, a child whose sudden appearance threatens his happy life. Robert's wife Sheila is a strong, loving spouse and mother whose deep love and commitment are stretched to the breaking point by the unexpected arrival of her husband's illegitimate son.

== Cast ==
- Martin Sheen as Robert Beckwith
- Blythe Danner as Sheila Beckwith
- Craig T. Nelson as Bernie Ackerman
- David Hemmings as Gavin Wilson
- Nathalie Nell as Nicole Guerin
- Maureen Anderman as Margo
- Sebastian Dungan as Jean-Claude Guerin
- Arlene McIntyre as Jessica Beckwith
- Melissa Francis as Paula Beckwith
- Billy Jayne as Davey Ackerman
- Ruth Silveira as Nancy Ackerman
- Jacques François as Louis

== Reception ==
The film opened to number 13 in its first weekend, with $802,702.
