= Roman Laughter =

1968 book by Erich Segal

Roman Laughter: The Comedy of Plautus
- Author: Erich Segal
- Publisher: Harvard University Press
- Publication date: 1968

Roman Laughter: The Comedy of Plautus is a book by Erich Segal, published by the Harvard University Press in 1968. It is a scholarly study of the work of the ancient Roman playwright Titus Maccius Plautus, whose "twenty complete comedies constitute the largest extant corpus of classical dramatic literature".

James W. Halporn, in a review in The Classical Journal, criticised Segal's "serious misunderstanding of Freudian psychology and his real lack of grasp of important Plautine scholarship" which in Halporn's view made the work as a whole "superficial, inaccurate, and misleading".
