= Doctors (novel) =

1988 novel by Erich Segal

- First edition
- Author: Erich Segal
- Language: English
- Publisher: Bantam Books
- Publication date: 1988
- Publication place: United States
- Media type: Hardcover
- Pages: 679pp
- ISBN: 0-553-05294-2
- OCLC: 17918030
- Dewey Decimal: 813/.54 19
- LC Class: PS3569.E4 D64 1988

Doctors is a 1988 novel by Erich Segal that deals with the Harvard Medical School class of 1962, with emphasis on the two main characters, Barney Livingston and Laura Castellano. They grew up next to each other and always aspired to be doctors, eventually ending up in medical school together. There they meet the other characters, who are fellow medical students. The issues of medical and research ethics and euthanasia form integral parts of the plot.

== Plot ==
Star basketball player Barney Livingston and Laura Castellano are neighbors in Brooklyn who are close friends. After graduating from Midwood High School in 1954 Livingston attends Columbia University and Castellano Radcliffe College, and both enter Harvard Medical School in 1958; he wants to become a psychiatrist, and she is interested in pediatrics. Others include Rhodes Scholar Bennett Landsmann, the Black adoptee of Jewish parents; former Jesuit Hank Dwyer; former Miss Oregon Grete Anderson; and students Peter Wyman and Seth Lazarus.

They survive the immense stress that drives some to suicide, and after graduation leave for internships and residencies. Livingston becomes an author and finds at the New York State Psychiatric Institute that psychiatrists can be as disturbed as their patients; Castellano's unhappy marriage to an Army officer causes both to have affairs; Wyman aggressively seeks fame as a researcher at Harvard; Landsmann at Yale–New Haven Hospital finds that some during the Civil Rights Movement dislike his two heritages; Anderson's beauty attracts men that she has difficulty forming relationships with; and Lazarus in Chicago begins to commit mercy killings of patients in great pain who want to die.

By their late 30s Livingston and Castellano, after many other relationships for both, marry and become first-time parents in New York City; Wyman is at a Silicon Valley biotechnology company; Anderson is a transplant surgeon in Houston; Dwyer opens a successful IVF clinic in Hawaii; and Landsmann, a lawyer after a spinal injury ends his surgical career, defends Lazarus in a trial for murder.

== Reception ==
The book received reviews from publications including Kirkus Reviews (starred review), Publishers Weekly and The New York Times.
