= Lois Wallace =

American literary agent (1940–2014)

- Born: Lois Kahn Wallace; May 25, 1940; New York, New York, U.S.
- Died: April 4, 2014 (aged 73); New York City, New York, U.S.
- Education: Brearley School; Vassar College
- Occupation: Literary agent
- Website: wallaceliteraryagency.com

Lois Kahn Wallace (May 25, 1940 – April 4, 2014) was a prominent American literary agent, known for her representation of numerous successful authors.

== Career ==
Born in Manhattan, she graduated from the Brearley School and Vassar College before taking a secretarial job for G.P. Putnam Sons in 1961. She went to work for agent Harold Ober in 1963, then joined the William Morris Agency literary department in 1967, where she became co-director before establishing her own agency in 1974.

While at William Morris, Wallace convinced Erich Segal, then known mainly as a Harvard classics professor, to write a novel based on a screenplay he had written. The book was published as Love Story in 1970 and became a gigantic bestseller, both as a novel and as a film. Other clients included William F. Buckley, Stacy Schiff, Joan Didion, Don DeLillo, and Ben Stein. She became known for her particularly tenacious representation of her clients. A 1986 Washington Post profile noted that her clients "talk gratefully of her ferocity in terms normally reserved for pit bulls"—one client nicknamed her "Sluggo".

== Personal life and death ==
She married book editor Tom Wallace in 1962; they divorced in 1999. She died of lung cancer in Manhattan at age 73, survived by a son. In a eulogy, Stein described her as "a small, elegant woman with an intense look" and "an extremely fancy Manhattan accent" who was "fanatical in her determination to get things sold" and who "smoked incessantly. Nonstop."
