= Tujhse Naaraz Nahi Zindagi =

Song by Anup Ghoshal (male version) Lata Mangeshkar (female version)
- Language: Hindi
- Released: 1983
- Composer: R. D. Burman
- Lyricist: Gulzar

"Tujhse Naaraz Nahi Zindagi" (lit. 'I am not angry with you, life...') is an Indian Hindi song from the Bollywood film Masoom (1983), starring Shabana Azmi and Naseeruddin Shah. The lyrics of the song was written by Gulzar, and composed by R. D. Burman. The song has two different versions — female, and male, and were sung by Lata Mangeshkar and Anup Ghoshal resepectively. In 1984, Gulzar won a Filmfare Award for Best Lyricist for this song.

== Theme ==
The opening lines of the song set the theme. The lyricist attempts to understand the strangeness of life. He claims he is upset, but not angry. In the film Masoom, the male version of the song sings and captures a father's helplessness and the female version narrates a woman's pain in dealing with her husband's illegitimate child.

== Awards ==
Gulzar, the lyricist of this song, won a Filmfare Award for Best Lyricist for this song in 1984. R. D. Burman won an award in the category of "best soundtrack".
