= The Class (Segal novel) =

1985 novel about the Harvard class of 1958

- First edition
- Author: Erich Segal
- Language: English
- Genre: Novel
- Publisher: Bantam Books
- Publication date: 1986
- Publication place: United States
- Media type: Print (Paperback)
- ISBN: 0-553-27090-7
- OCLC: 26900441

The Class is Erich Segal's 6th novel, published in 1985. The class of the title is the Harvard University Class of 1958. The book is about five fictional members of this class: Andrew Eliot, Jason Gilbert, Theodore Lambros, Daniel Rossi, and George Keller.

== Plot summary ==
The Class follows the diverse fates of five members of Harvard's Class of 1958 (which was Segal's own class in real life) recounting the way their lives intertwine, and coming to a dramatic conclusion at their class reunion, twenty-five years later.

Andrew Eliot comes from the Boston Brahmin Eliot family. Due to his background, he feels the pressure of high expectations, which causes him to suffer from lack of confidence. He is otherwise laid-back and friendly, and a good friend to all his classmates. To experience life without privilege and to fulfill his military obligation, he serves in the navy as an ordinary swabbie. After his military service, he enters an ill-fated marriage to the daughter of one of his father's classmates and takes up a career in investment banking. Unfortunately, his wife is a serial adultress and alcoholic and demands a divorce, leaving him estranged from his own son and daughter, with limited visitation after his wife places both in boarding school at the age of 9 and 6, denying him custodial rights and frustrating his attempts to give them a home life. He has an interest in his family's history during the American Revolution, which in turn leads to him following his conscience and helping organize the Moratorium Day protests on Wall Street.

Jason Gilbert, Jr., son of Jason Gilbert, Sr. né Jacob Gruenwald, has the makings of a perfect son, of whom any parent would be proud. Despite this, the one thing that troubles him is his constant conflict with his identity as a Jew, despite his parents' assimilation and conversion to Unitarianism. He experiences prejudice at several points, when denied admission to Yale and when denied invitation to the punches of Harvard's final clubs. He sees more pervasive racism when a popular black athlete is denied entrance to the Hasty Pudding Club, and when a drill instructor punishes him during his service in the Marines when he inadvertently invites him to a segregated restaurant off-base, which the drill instructor interpreted as taunting. Over the course of the book, he accepts his identity through the loss of his Dutch Christian fiancée, a pediatrician who is killed while attending a sick kibbutznik child during a visit to Israel. The incident leads him to immigrate to Israel and become a kibbutznik himself and join the Israeli paratroopers, in exploring the Jewish identity that had been denied to him throughout his life by his family's assimilation while being externally imposed on him. He participates in the Six-Day War and the Yom Kippur War, and dies during the rescue of Jewish hostages from Uganda.

Theodore Lambros was born to a working class Greek family, and is admitted to Harvard with no scholarship after graduating from Cambridge Latin School. He thus must work as a waiter to support himself throughout his schooling, unable to afford to live on campus. This makes it difficult for him to truly "belong" to his class. All the same, he endures and eventually achieves his ambition of securing a professorship in the classics at Harvard. Tragically, he no longer has a wife to share it with, after committing adultery while on sabbatical at Christ Church, and his subsequent divorce from his college sweetheart.

Daniel Rossi is a talented pianist. His father disowns him for his choice of Harvard in light of President Pusey's refusal to cooperate with the McCarthy hearings, particularly after the death of his older son in the Korean War. Daniel chooses Harvard on the advice of his mentor in music, Gustav Landau, who likens the McCarthy persecutions to those of the Third Reich which he himself fled. Daniel eventually wins his father's approval from his success and fame as a pianist, composer of a Broadway musical and conductor of two orchestras, but finds the belated acceptance meaningless after years of estrangement. His hectic way of life alienates him from his family, as he becomes a serial adulterer addicted to stimulants and phenothiazine. The drug addiction becomes his downfall and causes severe motor dysfunction that ends his musical career, but redeems him through allowing him to reconcile with his wife and daughters.

George Keller, né Gyuri Kolozsdi, enters the United States as a Hungarian refugee following the student uprising in 1956, and is granted a place in the Harvard Class of 1958. He rushes to assimilate as quickly as possible and becomes fluent in English in seven months. He remains paranoid and deeply regrets his abandonment of his fiancée, a Budapest pharmacy student, in the rush to flee Hungary. His determination and fierce loyalty to his country of refuge eventually result in a position in the White House, as a protégé of Henry Kissinger. His emotional detachment leaves him unable to form a meaningful relationship with his wife or to consider becoming a father, and they eventually divorce. After a lengthy speech at his 25th class reunion, where he is confronted with the human toll of his policy implementation in the Vietnam War, he commits suicide, asking Andrew Eliot, as his estate executor, to send his money back to his family in Hungary.
