= The Lady from Dubuque =

Play by Edward Albee

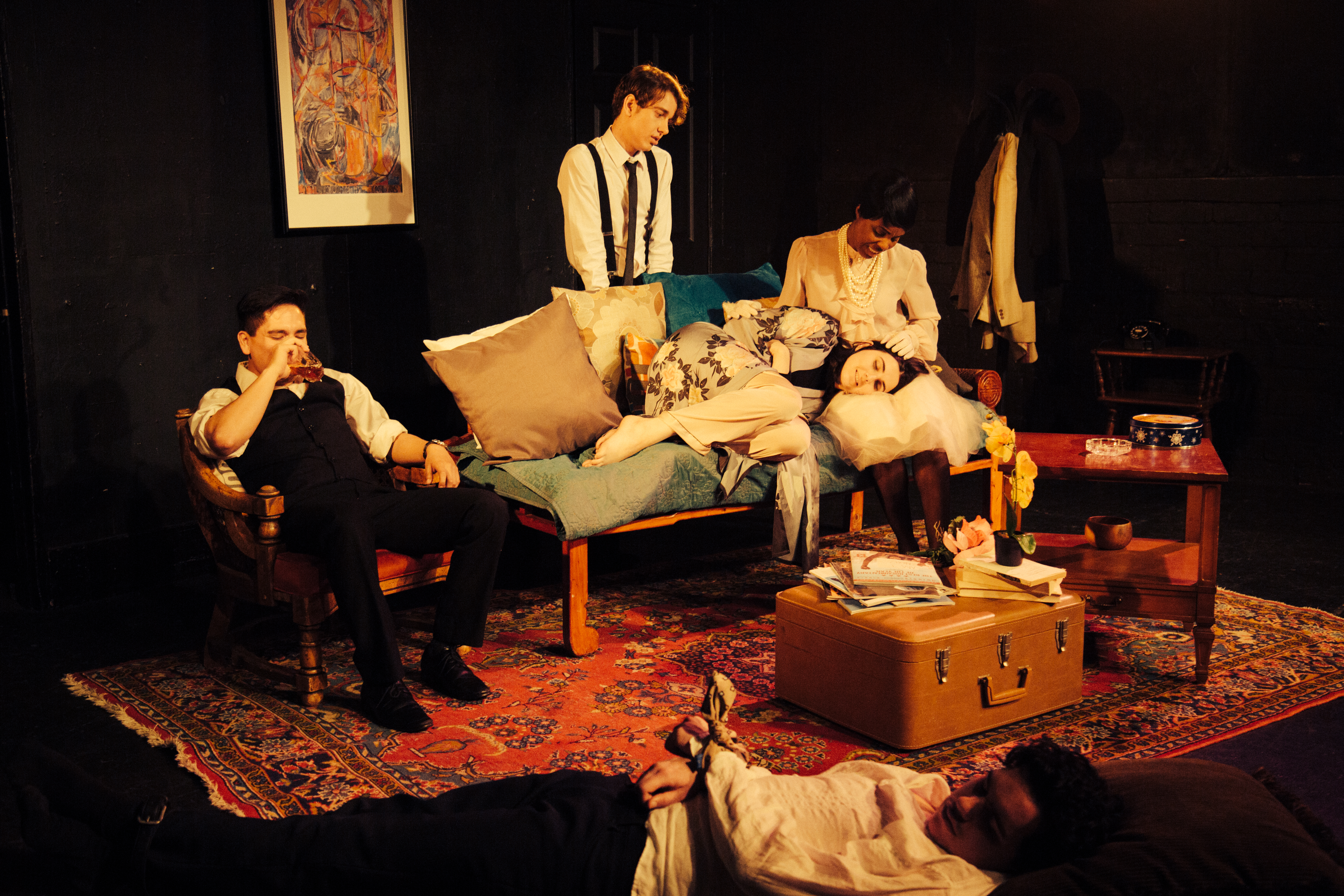
A scene from a 2017 production of the play

The Lady from Dubuque is a play by Edward Albee, which premiered on Broadway in 1980 for a brief run. The play ran in London in 2007.

== Productions ==
The Lady from Dubuque opened on Broadway at the Morosco Theatre on January 31, 1980, and closed on February 9, 1980, after 12 performances and 8 previews. Directed by Alan Schneider, the set design was by Rouben Ter-Arutunian, lighting by Richard Nelson, costumes by John Falabella, and Irene Worths's costumes by Pauline Trigère. The cast featured Celia Weston (Lucinda), Tony Musante (Sam), Frances Conroy (Jo), Baxter Harris (Fred), David Leary (Edgar), Maureen Anderman (Carol), Earle Hyman (Oscar), and Irene Worth (Elizabeth). The show starred Irene Worth (who had originated leading roles in Albee plays Tiny Alice and Listening) and Earle Hyman alongside a youthful cast headed by Broadway debutante Frances Conroy, with costars such as Maureen Anderman, who had appeared in Albee's 1975 play Seascape and the 1976 revival of his Who's Afraid of Virginia Woolf?, Tony Musante, and Celia Weston. The play received Tony Award nominations for Anderman and Hyman, as Featured Actress and Actor.

It was produced at the Seattle Repertory Theatre from January 11 to February 10, 2007. Directed by David Esbjornson, the cast featured Carla Harting (Jo), Myra Carter (Elizabeth), Kristin Flanders, and Paul Morgan Stetler. Esbjornson thought about asking Albee to "update the script, but ultimately kept its late-1970s setting. 'I think it reflects how after Vietnam and Nixon, people were turning inwards more and looking at the personal more than the political. It’s also a middle play for Edward, with some familiar themes, like the arrival of outsiders, the darkness and complexity of relationships and how … surface civility can be undermined.'"

An Off-Broadway revival opened at the Signature Theatre Company, running from March 5, 2012, to April 15, 2012. The cast starred Jane Alexander (Elizabeth), Michael Hayden (Sam), Laila Robins (Jo), Peter Francis James (Oscar), and Catherine Curtain (Lucinda). The production received nominations for the 2012 Drama Desk Award, Outstanding Revival of a Play; 2012 Outer Critics Circle Award for Outstanding Revival of a Play and Outstanding Actress in a Play, Laila Robins; and 2012 Lucille Lortel Award for Outstanding Featured Actor, Peter Francis James and Outstanding Revival. Laila Robins won the 2012 Richard Seff Award.

=== London production ===
The London premiere took place on March 6, 2007 (previews) at the Theatre Royal, Haymarket, directed by Anthony Page and starring Maggie Smith, Catherine McCormack (Jo), Chris Larkin (Edgar), Robert Sella (Sam), Peter Francis James (Oscar), Vivienne Benesch (Lucinda), Jennifer Regan (Carol), and Glenn Fleshler (Fred).

== Synopsis ==
The play's first act finds three young couples (Sam + Jo hosting Fred + Carol and Lucinda + Edgar) engaging in party games like Twenty Questions. Jo's angry bitterness becomes apparent earlier than its source, which is the terminal disease that tortures her and will soon claim her life. At the end of the act, after the mounting tension drives the guests to leave, Sam carries Jo up to bed. Suddenly, a fourth couple appears from the wings: a glamorous older woman (Elizabeth) and her black companion (Oscar). She asks the audience, "Are we in time? Is this the place?" and answers her own questions: "Yes, we are in time. This is the place." The curtain falls.

In Act One, the recurrent theme of the game was "Who are you?" Now that question becomes more serious, as Sam, shocked by the appearance of these strangers in his house, repeatedly demands that Elizabeth reveal her identity. She eventually insists that she is Jo's mother, come from Dubuque, Iowa "for her daughter's dying". However, Sam knows Jo's mother as a small, balding woman with pink hair, who lives in New Jersey and is estranged from Jo, and Elizabeth is clearly not she. Unfortunately for Sam, who vigorously protests the veracity of Elizabeth's claims, Jo runs into Elizabeth's arms and never questions her appearance or identity. Whoever she and Oscar may—or may not—be, they clearly represent the coming of Death, something familiar and unknown. At the end of the play, Oscar carries the dying Jo upstairs one last time. As the devastated Sam demands once more to learn Elizabeth's true identity, she ends the play with this line: "Why, I'm the lady from Dubuque. I thought you knew. [to the audience] I thought he knew."

Elizabeth's curtain lines, quoted above, typify the Pirandellian style of the play's dialogue, in which characters frequently make comments directly to the audience (the first occurs very early, when Jo, observing the Twenty Questions game in progress, looks out at the audience and asks, "Don't you hate party games?"). These lines, reflected in the play's name, are a joke on the 1925 stereotyping editorial statement, "[the New Yorker magazine] is not edited for the old lady in Dubuque."

== Critical response ==
Michael Billington, in his review of the 2007 London production, wrote: "...to me the lady from Dubuque is clearly the angel of death: a theory supported by the way the uxorious Sam resists her, while the pain-stricken Jo accepts her warm embrace. As in A Delicate Balance, Albee is also offering a metaphor for a decaying civilisation. This is a world where friendship is meaningless, words such as 'liberty' are dismissed as mere semantics, and where the mysterious intruder remarks that 'we're too bewildered to survive' ".

Ben Brantley, in his review of the Off-Broadway 2012 production for The New York Times, wrote: "as David Esbjornson’s crisp production reminds us, the Albee of Virginia Woolf is very much present in Dubuque. For one thing, the little shindig that begins this later play echoes the nasty revels of Virginia Woolf, in which 'get the guest' was the favorite parlor game...The Lady From Dubuque is an allegory. It’s about what happens when death comes to call, and how we all do our damnedest to turn it away or pretend it isn’t there... the talk may be arch and precious and on occasion ponderous. Mr. Albee can’t help himself. But that dialogue is always impeccably paced."

== Awards and nominations ==
=== Original Broadway production ===
Year	Award	Category	Nominee	Result
1980	Tony Award	Best Featured Actor in a Play	Earle Hyman	Nominated
1980	Tony Award	Best Featured Actress in a Play	Maureen Anderman	Nominated
