= Olangal =

- Poster
- Directed by: Balu Mahendra
- Screenplay by: Balu Mahendra
- Produced by: Joseph Abraham
- Starring: Amol Palekar; Poornima Jayaram; Ambika; Adoor Bhasi; Anju
- Cinematography: Balu Mahendra
- Edited by: D. Vasu
- Music by: Ilaiyaraaja
- Release date: 27 August 1982
- Country: India
- Language: Malayalam

Olangal (transl. Waves) is a 1982 Indian Malayalam-language film, directed by Balu Mahendra. The film's plot is inspired by the 1980 Erich Segal novel Man, Woman and Child.

== Plot ==
Ravi and Radha are a couple who live with their only daughter. Life goes on happily for them until Father John arrives in the city with a young boy, Raju, Ravi's son from an affair with Rita, before his marriage to Radha. Now he has to keep the boy with him for a month before John takes the boy abroad. Ravi introduces the boy to his wife as the son of a dead friend, George, and she happily agrees to keep the boy with them. But the truth emerges when the "dead friend" visits their house. The six-year-long marriage between Ravi and Radha shatters.

== Cast ==
- Amol Palekar as Ravi Chattan
- Poornima Jayaram as Radha R. Chattan – Ravi's wife
- Ambika as Rita
- Anju
- Adoor Bhasi
- T. R. Omana
- Preeta
- Jagathy Sreekumar

== Soundtrack ==
The music was composed by Ilaiyaraaja. The song "Thumbi Vaa" is an adaptation of Ilaiyaraaja's earlier Tamil composition "Sangathil Padatha" from Auto Raaja (1982).

All lyrics are written by O. N. V. Kurup.

No.	Title	Singer(s)	Length
1.	"Kuliradunnu Maanathu"	K. J. Yesudas, Choir
2.	"Thumbi Vaa Thumbakudathin"	S. Janaki
3.	"Vezhaambal Kezhum Venalkkudeeram"	K. J. Yesudas, S. Janaki

== Reception ==
Sreedhar Pillai wrote for India Today, "As always with Mahendra's films the photography is superb. It captures the lush green of Ooty and the urban landscape of Bangalore with equal ease. Amol Palekar gives a subdued performance."
