= Man, Woman and Child =

Erich Segal novel

- Author: Erich Segal
- Publication date: 1981
- ISBN: 978-0-553-56235-4

Man, Woman and Child is a novel by Erich Segal. It details the lives of Robert and Sheila Beckwith and their daughters Jessica and Paula.

== Synopsis ==
Robert is contacted one day by a friend in France, who tells him that Nicole, a woman with whom Robert had had an affair years ago, has died - and Jean-Claude, the son Robert never knew he had, is now an orphan. That evening, Robert explains the situation to his wife, Sheila, and they agree to take in Jean-Claude for the summer holidays; however, they also agree to keep Jean-Claude's true identity a secret.

Later that summer, Sheila, chief editor of the Harvard University Press, is, encouraged by her best friend Margo, tempted by the possibility of an affair with a British professor whose book she has been editing. At the same time, Robert's daughters, Jessica and Paula, discover Jean-Claude's true identity, through Davey Ackerman, Robert's friend's son. They refuse to speak to their father.

As Robert Beckwith is bringing Jean-Claude to the airport to return to France, the boy suddenly falls ill and is hospitalized. After surgery, during which the Beckwiths become closer again, Jean-Claude makes a full recovery.

At last, the whole family come to terms with Jean-Claude and their relationship with him and would like him to live with them. However, Jean-Claude refuses politely, for he has to go to the school in France chosen by his mother years before.

== Film adaptations ==
Erich Segal adapted his novel into a screenplay and the film was released into theaters in 1983. The film starred Martin Sheen as Robert Beckwith, Blythe Danner as Sheila Beckwith, Craig T. Nelson as Bernie Ackerman, David Hemmings as Gavin Wilson, and Maureen Anderman as Margo.

Balu Mahendra's 1982 Malayalam film Olangal was inspired by the novel. It featured Amol Palekar, Poornima Jayaram and Ambika in the lead roles.

Masoom, a 1983 Bollywood film directed by film maker Shekhar Kapur, was an adaptation of the novel featuring Bollywood actors Naseeruddin Shah, Shabana Azmi and Saeed Jaffery.

A Pakistani adaptation of this novel, Kabhi Alvida Na Kehna, was released in 1983 starring Shabnam and Javed Sheikh.

Jab Pyaar Kisise Hota Hai, a 1998 Bollywood film starring Salman Khan and Twinkle Khanna was also an adaptation of this novel.

An Indonesian adaptation, directed by Sophan Sophiaan, was released in 1984. It starred Frans Tumbuan, Lenny Marlina, and Sandy Taroreh.

Poo Poova Poothirukku, a 1987 Tamil language movie was also based on this book.
