= Reeling (book) =

- First edition
- Author: Pauline Kael
- Language: English
- Genre: Non-fiction
- Publisher: Little Brown
- Publication date: 1976
- Publication place: United States
- Pages: 497
- ISBN: 9780316481793

Reeling is Pauline Kael's fifth collection of movie reviews, covering the years 1972 through 1975. First published in 1976 by Little Brown, the book is largely composed of movie reviews, ranging from her famous review of Last Tango in Paris to her review of A Woman Under the Influence, but it also contains a longer essay entitled "On the Future of Movies" as well as a book review of The Fred Astaire & Ginger Rogers Book, by fellow The New Yorker dance critic Arlene Croce. In 2010, four film critics polled by the British Film Institute listed Reeling among their favorite books related to cinema.

Reeling is out-of-print in the United States, but is still published by Marion Boyars Publishers in the United Kingdom.
