= Erich Segal =

American author (1937–2010)

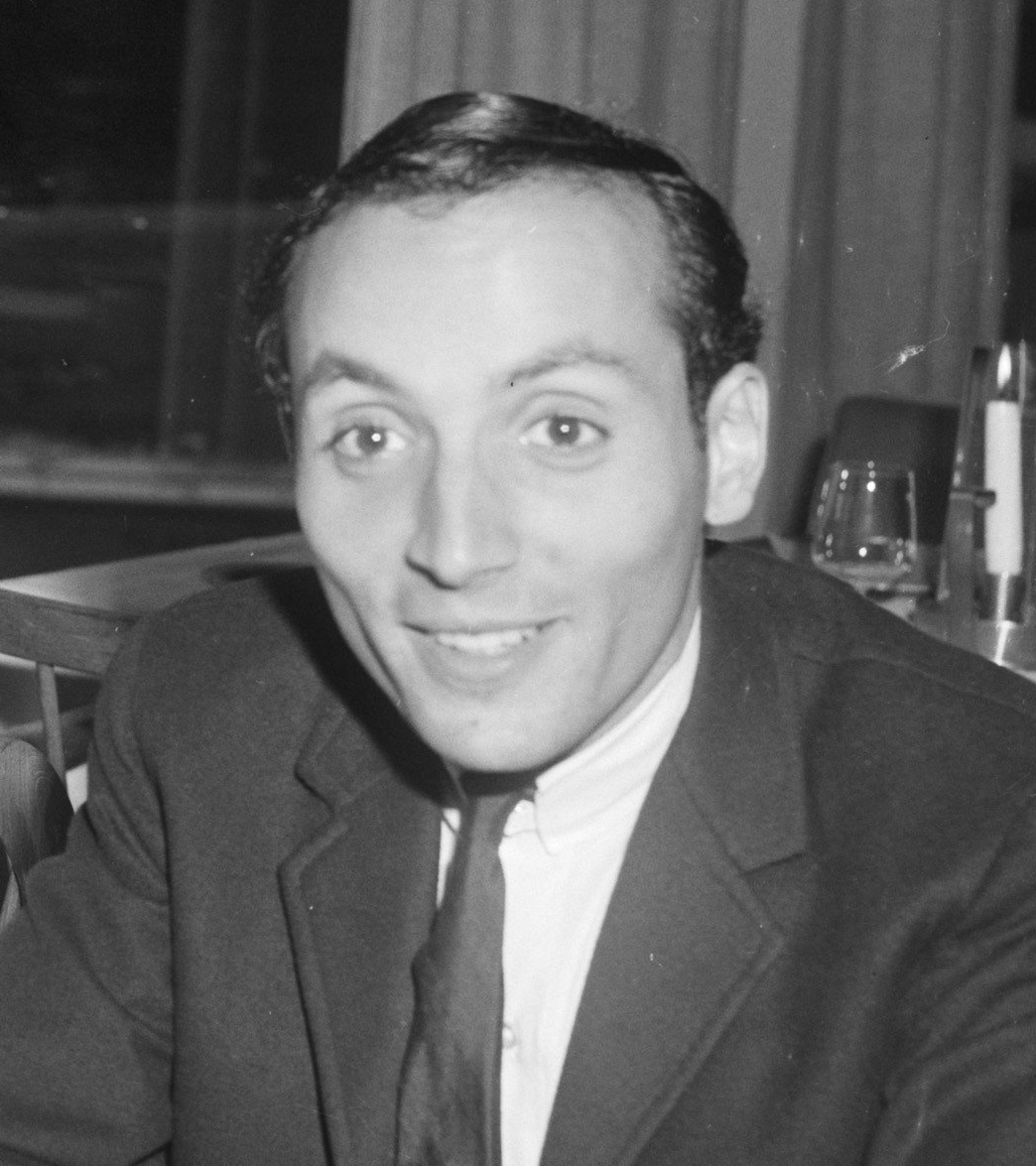
- Segal in 1965
- Born: Erich Wolf Segal; June 16, 1937; Brooklyn, New York, U.S.
- Died: January 17, 2010 (aged 72); London, England
- Education: Harvard University (A.B., A.M., Ph.D.)
- Occupations: Author; screenwriter; educator
- Spouse: Karen Marianne James (m. 1975)
- Children: 2
- Website: erichsegal.com

Erich Wolf Segal (June 16, 1937 – January 17, 2010) was an American author, screenwriter, educator, and classicist who wrote the bestselling novel Love Story (1970) and its film adaptation.

== Early life and education ==
Born and raised in a Jewish household in Brooklyn, New York, Segal was the first of three brothers. His father, Samuel Segal (1904–1961), was a prominent rabbi in the Reform Judaism movement (best known for serving as spiritual director of the now-defunct Mount Neboh Congregation at 130 West 79th Street from 1939 to 1961) who was educated at the University of Pennsylvania (B.A., 1928; M.A., 1929) and New York University (Ph.D. in religion on the history of Jewish day schools in New York City, 1952), while his mother was a homemaker; his grandfather was from Vilnius. His interest in writing and narrating stories developed as a child, when his father published various Judaica-oriented reference books.

Although his family had since relocated from Brooklyn to a luxury Upper West Side apartment house on West End Avenue in Manhattan, he attended Midwood High School (approximately an hour away via the New York City Subway) in the former borough, likely due to its reputation as one of the few New York City public high schools of the era that consistently served as a feeder to Ivy League and Seven Sisters undergraduate institutions under the aegis of longtime guidance counselor Elizabeth Bradshaw. During his tenure at Midwood, he suffered a serious accident while canoeing. His coach advised him to jog as a part of his rehabilitation, which ended up becoming his lifelong avocation, enjoining him to participate in the Boston Marathon more than 12 times. He attended Harvard College, graduating as both the class poet and Latin salutatorian in 1958, and then obtained his master's degree (in 1959) and a doctorate (in 1965) in comparative literature from Harvard University, after which he started teaching at Yale.

== Writing career ==
In 1967, through connections on Broadway, Segal was given the opportunity to collaborate on the screenplay for the Beatles' 1968 motion picture Yellow Submarine, based on a story by Lee Minoff. He occasionally worked as an actor, having a supporting role in the French crime thriller Without Apparent Motive and a cameo appearance as a gondolier in Jennifer on My Mind, which he also wrote.

His first academic book, Roman Laughter: The Comedy of Plautus (1968), published by the Harvard University Press, gave him considerable recognition and chronicled the great Roman comic playwright who inspired the Broadway hit A Funny Thing Happened on the Way to the Forum (1962).

In the late 1960s, and early 1970s Segal collaborated on other screenplays. He wrote a romantic story about a Harvard student and a Radcliffe student but failed to sell it. Literary agent Lois Wallace at the William Morris Agency then suggested he turn the script into a novel, and the result was Love Story (1970). A New York Times No. 1 bestseller, the book became the top-selling work of fiction for 1970 in the United States, and was translated into 33 languages worldwide. The motion picture of the same name was the number one box office attraction of 1970.

The novel proved problematic for Segal. He acknowledged that its success unleashed "egotism bordering on megalomania" and he was denied tenure at Yale. However, the tenure committee did believe that Segal should be offered a non-tenure track position of senior lecturer.

Moreover, Love Story "was ignominiously bounced from the nomination slate of the National Book Awards after the fiction jury threatened to resign." Segal later said that the book "totally ruined me." He would go on to write more novels and screenplays, including the 1977 sequel to Love Story, titled Oliver's Story. Although Segal harbored regrets about the success that came with Love Story, a Harper executive named Mel Zerman remembered happier moments. Zerman told American Legends website that Love Story "was the easiest book to promote. All over the country interview programs wanted him. There was hardly a major radio show or TV show he wasn't on. Harper sent him on three tours, and he loved it. I have never known an author who got more pleasure out of being on these shows. He was born to do this. He talked a lot. He was interesting. He was funny. The fact that [Segal] was a Yale professor and taught classics, not contemporary literature, added to this allure."

Segal published scholarly works on Greek and Latin literature and taught Greek and Latin literature at Harvard University, Yale University, and Princeton University. He was a Supernumerary Fellow and an Honorary Fellow of Wolfson College at Oxford University. He served as a visiting professor at Princeton University, LMU Munich, and Dartmouth College.

His novel The Class (1985), a saga based on the Harvard Class of 1958, was a bestseller, and won literary honors in France and Italy. Doctors (1988) was another New York Times bestseller. In 2001, he published a book on the history of theatre called The Death of Comedy.

== Marathons ==
Segal was an accomplished competitive runner. He had been a sprinter at Midwood High School, and ran the two-mile at Harvard College. He began marathon running during his second year at Harvard, when track and field head coach Bill McCurdy was impressed with how fast he had run 10 miles. Segal ran in the Boston Marathon almost every year from 1955 to 1975. He finished in 79th place at 3 hours, 43 minutes in his first attempt, and his best performance was in 1964 when he finished 63rd with a time of 2:56:30. He recounted that, after one Boston marathon, someone yelled, "Hey, Segal, you run better than you write". Segal was featured in the 1965 documentary short Marathon, which documents the 1964 Boston Marathon and was directed by filmmakers Joyce Chopra and Robert Gardner.

Segal was a color commentator for Olympic marathons during telecasts of both the 1972 and 1976 Summer Olympics. His most notable broadcast was in 1972, when he and Jim McKay called Frank Shorter's gold medal-winning performance. After an impostor, West German student Norbert Sudhaus, ran into Olympic Stadium ahead of Shorter, an emotionally upset Segal yelled, "That is an impostor! Get him off the track! This happens in bush league marathons! This doesn't happen in an Olympic marathon! Throw the bum out! Get rid of that guy!" When Shorter appeared to be confused by the events, Segal yelled, "come on, Frank, you won it!" and "Frank, it's a fake, Frank!"

In 2000, The Washington Post included the incident among the 10 most memorable American sports calls (albeit misquoting the latter line as being "it's a fraud, Frank!"). In a 2010 posthumous tribute to Segal, marathon runner Amby Burfoot called Segal's call "one of the most unprofessional, unbridled, and totally appropriate outbursts in the history of Olympic TV commentary", taking into consideration the fact that Segal had taught Shorter at Yale.

== Personal life ==
=== Family ===
Segal married Karen James in 1975 and subsequently settled in North West London; they had two daughters, Miranda and Francesca Segal. Francesca, born in 1980, is a freelance journalist, literary critic, and columnist.

=== Death ===
Segal, who suffered from Parkinson's disease, died of a heart attack on January 17, 2010, and was buried in London. In a eulogy delivered at his funeral, his daughter Francesca said, "That he fought to breathe, fought to live, every second of the last 30 years of illness with such mind-blowing obduracy, is a testament to the core of who he was – a blind obsessionality that saw him pursue his teaching, his writing, his running and my mother, with just the same tenacity. He was the most dogged man any of us will ever know."

=== Love Story ===
Segal attended Midwood High School in Brooklyn at the same time as Janet Sussman and future technology research pioneer Gideon Gartner. Segal and Gartner each became smitten with Sussman and each pursued her through and beyond their college years. In 1961 Sussman married Gartner, and as Segal told the Italian news magazine Oggi, it was his heartbreak over losing her that eventually led him to write Love Story. “That's why in the book, Jennifer dies: because for me she had died.”

== Novels ==
- 1970: Love Story
- 1973: Fairy Tale
- 1977: Oliver's Story
- 1981: Man, Woman and Child
- 1985: The Class
- 1988: Doctors
- 1992: Acts of Faith
- 1995: Prizes
- 1997: Only Love

== Filmography ==
- 1968: Yellow Submarine
- 1970: The Games
- 1970: R. P. M.
- 1970: Love Story
- 1971: Jennifer on My Mind
- 1978: Oliver's Story
- 1980: A Change of Seasons
- 1983: Man, Woman and Child

== Bibliography ==
- Segal, Erich (1970) [1968], Roman Laughter: The Comedy of Plautus, Harvard studies in comparative literature, Harvard University Press, OCLC 253490621
- Segal, Erich (1968), Euripides: A Collection of Critical Essays, Prentice-Hall, OCLC 490074853
- Segal, Erich (1993) [1970], Love Story, Oxford bookworms, Oxford University Press, OCLC 271780786
- Segal, Erich (1973), Fairy Tale, Hodder and Stoughton, ISBN 978-0-340-17703-7, OCLC 476324471
- Segal, Erich (1977), Oliver's Story, Granada, ISBN 978-0-246-11007-7
- Segal, Erich (1980), Man, Woman and Child, Granada, ISBN 978-0-246-11364-1
- Segal, Erich (1983), Oxford Readings in Greek Tragedy, Oxford University Press, ISBN 978-0-19-872110-9, OCLC 489881338
- Millar, Fergus; Erich Segal (1984). Caesar Augustus: Seven Aspects. Clarendon Press. ISBN 0-19-814858-5.
- Segal, Erich (1985), The Class, Bantam, ISBN 978-0-593-01004-4
- Segal, Erich (1988), Doctors, Toronto, ISBN 978-0-553-05294-7
- Segal, Erich (1992), Acts of Faith, OCLC 472522180
- Segal, Erich (1995), Prizes, Bantam, ISBN 978-0-593-03837-6
- Segal, Erich (1996), Four Comedies: The Braggart Soldier, the Brothers Menaechmus, the Haunted House, the Pot of Gold, World's classics, Oxford University Press, ISBN 978-0-19-283108-8, OCLC 57136525
- Segal, Erich (1997), Only Love, G.P. Putnam's Sons, ISBN 978-0-399-14341-0
- Segal, Erich (2001), The Death of Comedy, Harvard University Press, ISBN 978-0-674-00643-0, OCLC 464104819
- Segal, Erich (2001), Oxford Readings in Menander, Plautus, and Terence, Oxford Univ. Press, ISBN 978-0-19-872193-2, OCLC 248042166
- Pelzer, Linda C. (1997), Erich Segal: A Critical Companion, Greenwood Press, ISBN 0-313-29930-7

== See also ==
- Love means never having to say you're sorry
