= Boston in fiction =

This articles lists various works of fiction that take place in Boston, Massachusetts:

== Video games ==
A number of popular video games are set in Boston, with several characters from the city appearing in multiple games.

- The Scout, a character in the video game Team Fortress 2 is from Boston and speaks with a Boston accent.
- Ash, a character in Ubisoft's Rainbow Six Siege, studied at Boston University. Another character, Delta Force operator Erik "Maverick" Thorn, is from Boston.
- In Tony Hawk's Underground 2, one of the levels is set in Boston.
- Mafia: The City of Lost Heaven the City of Lost Heaven bears a slight resemblance to Boston.
- In Rock Band and Rock Band 2, Boston is a featured city that one's fictional band can play gigs in.
- In Assassin's Creed III, Boston features as a main city during the course of the game.
- In The Last of Us, some of the game is set in post-apocalyptic Boston.
- Nathan and Samuel Drake, characters from the Uncharted franchise, grew up in Boston
- Fallout 4 is set in Boston, as well as surrounding areas such as Concord, Quincy, and Lexington.
- AaAaAA!!! – A Reckless Disregard for Gravity is set in an alternate reality version of Boston.
- Call of Cthulhu: Dark Corners of the Earth takes place in Boston, taking after H.P. Lovecraft's works.

== Literature ==
- ’’While the music lasts’’ William M. Bulger
- Alone by Lisa Gardner
- Altered States by Paddy Chayefsky
- As I was Crossing Boston Common by Norma Farber
- Back Bay by William Martin
- The Big Dig by Linda Barnes
- Blaze by Richard Bachman
- The "Bloody Jack" historical-fiction series, by L. A. Meyer, first mentioned in The Curse of the Blue Tattoo, when Jacky is put off in Boston to attend Lawson Peabody's School for Young Girls
- Boston Adventure by Jean Stafford
- A Boston Girl, Anita Diamant
- The Bostonians by Henry James; life in aristocratic Boston during the late nineteenth century
- Carlotta Carlyle Mysteries by Linda Barnes; featuring a taxi-driving detective in Boston
- A Case of Need by Michael Crichton
- A Catch of Consequence by Diana Norman
- Caucasia, by Danzy Senna, a coming of age novel of Birdie, a biracial girl
- Cell by Stephen King; a traditional zombie story set in present-day Boston
- The Chippendales by Robert Grant, novel, old Boston society confronted by the emerging new in the 1880s
- Combat Boy by James Vance Elliott, a novel featuring both the Boston crime world of the 70s and the Massachusetts high-tech world of the 90s
- Crisis by Robin Cook, novel, early 21st century; begins with a tale of two doctors, one practicing in NYC and one in Boston, with the former's trial for malpractice taking place in Boston; most of the action occurs in Boston
- The Da Vinci Code by Dan Brown; Boston is the home of protagonist Robert Langdon
- The Dandy Vigilante by Kevin Daley, a hard-boiled mystery about a Boston news reporter, crime, and city hall corruption
- The Dante Club, a murder mystery featuring Harvard personalities Henry Wadsworth Longfellow, James Russell Lowell, and Oliver Wendell Holmes, as well as publisher James T. Fields; takes place in Boston and Cambridge, by Matthew Pearl (2003)
- Dead Heat by Linda Barnes
- Easter Rising by Michael Patrick MacDonald
- The Europeans by Henry James
- Fair Game by Patricia Briggs. Takes place in an urban fantasy version of Boston that features some of the real life historic sites and culture.
- Fallout by Harry Turtledove, an alternate history novel in the Hot War series, where the Korean War escalates into World War III, the city was destroyed by a Soviet atomic bomb in May 1952. The blast also burned the USS Constitution to the waterline.
- Find Me by Laura van den Berg
- Firmin by Sam Savage, a magical-realist account of the destruction of Scollay Square
- Flashpoint by Linda Barnes
- Flynn's World by Gregory Mcdonald
- Future Boston a shared universe novel by the Cambridge Science Fiction Writers Workshop
- The Given Day, novel by Dennis Lehane, takes place in post-World War I Boston
- Gone, Baby, Gone by Dennis Lehane
- The Handmaid's Tale by Margaret Atwood; post-nuclear Cambridge and Boston are the setting of this dystopian novel
- Heated Rivalry by Rachel Reid; Ilya Rozanov lives in Boston, playing for their hockey team
- Home Before Dark by Eileen Bassing
- Infinite Jest by David Foster Wallace, set in a partly fictionalized Boston
- Innocence by David Hosp; Boston is the main setting of this thriller/courtroom novel
- Intuition by Allegra Goodman
- Johnny Tremain by Esther Forbes takes place in Boston in the early 1770s
- Kane and Abel, Jeffrey Archer's novel about rivalry; William Kane is from Boston
- Karma and Other Stories, short stories by Rishi Reddi
- Last Dance by Lee Grove
- The Last Hurrah by Edwin O'Connor; O'Connor's 1956 account of big-city politics, inspired by the career of longtime Boston Mayor James Michael Curley
- Last Night in Twisted River by John Irving (2009), partly set in the North End
- The Late George Apley by John P. Marquand; tragicomic satire of the life of an upper-class Bostonian from the mid-19th century to the Great Depression; winner of the Pulitzer Prize
- Little House by Boston Bay by Melissa Wiley
- Looking Backward, utopian novel written in 1887 and set in Boston in 2000
- Love Story by Erich Segal
- Magnus Chase and the Gods of Asgard by Rick Riordan
- Make Way for Ducklings, iconic children's picture book set in Boston Public Garden
- "The Magic Bonbons" by Lyman Frank Baum, his American Fairy Tales, 1901
- A Modern Instance by William Dean Howells
- Murder at Fenway Park by Troy Soos
- Mystic River by Dennis Lehane
- The Namesake by Jhumpa Lahiri, set largely in Cambridge and Boston, explores the difficulties of Indian-Americans making their homes in America
- Oh Boy, Boston by Patricia Reilly Giff; the Polk Street Kids take a trip to Boston
- On Beauty, novel by Zadie Smith (2005), takes place partly in a fictional town outside Boston; parts of Boston center are visited
- The Paper Chase, novel by John Jay Osborn Jr. (1970)
- The Passionate Mistakes and Intricate Corruption of One Girl in America, in which Michelle Tea charts the turbulent adventures in Boston's teenage goth world
- Pickman's Model by H. P. Lovecraft; takes place in Boston
- Professor Romeo by Anne Bernays
- The Pursuit of Alice Thrift by Elinor Lipman
- Rare Objects by Kathleen Tessaro
- Rent Girl, Michelle Tea's graphic memoir of sex work in Boston, illustrated by Laurenn McCubbin
- The Rise of Silas Lapham by William Dean Howells
- Run by Ann Patchett is set in modern Cambridge and Boston; a novel exploring family and race relations
- Running Man by Richard Bachman takes place partly in Boston
- The "Sarah Kelling / Max Bittersohn" mystery series by Charlotte MacLeod
- The Scarlet Letter by Nathaniel Hawthorne
- Shutter Island, novel by Dennis Lehane, takes place on a fictional island on the Boston Harbor
- Small Vices by Robert B. Parker
- The Sound and the Fury by William Faulkner; part of the story occurs in Boston
- The Southern Victory Series by Harry Turtledove; has many characters who live in or are from the Boston area
- The "Spenser" detective novels, by Robert B. Parker
- The Technologists by Matthew Pearl (2012); alternative history about the founding of MIT
- Thin Air by Robert B. Parker
- The Tucker Mysteries, by Ray Daniel (author)*Under Copp's Hill by Katherine Ayres; children's story set in 1908
- Unleavened Bread by Judge Robert Grant, set partly in Boston
- The Vanished Child by Sarah Smith (writer), set partly in Boston
- The Virgin Knows by Christine Palamidessi Moore; sibling rivalry and art theft (from the basements of Harvard's Fogg); set in Boston's Italian North End
- Vital Signs by Robin Cook; Boston is the home of protagonist Marissa Blumenthal
- You Can't Take a Balloon into the Museum of Fine Arts by Jacqueline Preiss Weitzman; a children's picture book about a girl's lost balloon floating past landmarks in Boston
- Zodiac by Neal Stephenson; an eco-thriller focusing on industrial pollution in Boston Harbor

== Television ==
A number of popular television series are set in Boston, four of which were notably created by David E. Kelley, who grew up in suburban Boston.

- Ally McBeal, romantic comedy popular in the late '90s, created by David E. Kelley of Belmont, Massachusetts
- Banacek, detective series starring George Peppard as Thomas Banacek
- Being Human, a werewolf, a ghost and a vampire share a house in Boston
- The Best Years, Canadian TV show set at a fictional Boston College
- Between the Lines, short-lived TV series based on the movie of the same title
- Boston Common, comedy about attending a fictional Boston college, featuring Anthony Clark
- Boston Legal, centered on a Boston law firm, created by David E. Kelley
- Boston Public, centered on a Boston public school, also created by David E. Kelley
- Chasing Life, about a journalist in Boston who is diagnosed with leukemia
- Cheers, by Charles-Burrow-Charles Productions and Paramount Pictures; centered on a Boston bar based on the Bull & Finch Pub.
- Crossing Jordan, crime drama, follows the lives of Boston Medical Examiner Jordan Cavanaugh and her co-workers
- Dr. Quinn, Medicine Woman, in the episodes "Where the Heart is", Parts 1 and 2.
- Dawson's Creek, teen drama 1998–2003; in Season 5 the main characters go to college in Boston
- Falling Skies, sci-fi drama set in Boston and the surrounding areas
- Frasier, the 2023 revival and sequel to the original Frasier; the title character originated in the Boston-set series Cheers, though the original Frasier series was set in Seattle.
- Fringe, set in Boston and surrounding area
- Goodnight, Beantown, sitcom dating to 1983
- How High, set at Harvard
- James at 15, later retitled James at 16
- Leverage, set in Boston
- Love Story in Harvard, South Korean series set among South Korean students at Harvard
- Once Upon a Time, season 1, episode one (South station)
- The Paper Chase, based on the 1970 novel and the 1973 film of the same title
- Park Street Under
- Paul Sand in Friends and Lovers, a short-lived 1974–75 situation comedy featuring Paul Sand as a double bass player for the Boston Symphony Orchestra
- The Handmaid's Tale, takes place in Boston following the establishment of a neo-Puritanic totalitarian state, Gilead.
- The Practice, centered on a Boston law firm, also created by David E. Kelley
- Rizzoli & Isles, drama starring Angie Harmon as Police Detective Jane Rizzoli and Sasha Alexander as Medical Examiner Dr. Maura Isles
- Sabrina, the Teenage Witch
- St. Elsewhere, drama set in the fictional St. Eligius Hospital in Boston
- Spenser: For Hire, featuring Robert Urich playing the Robert B. Parker character
- Suite Life of Zack & Cody, comedy made for the younger audience; takes place in a fictional hotel in Boston
- survivors remorse, the family is from dorchester
- Two Guys and a Girl
- Unhitched, about a group of newly single friends learning the lessons of starting over in their 30s
- The X-Files, in "Medusa" (Episode 12 of Season 8), Agents Doggett and Scully investigate suspicious deaths on the Boston subway system

== Film ==
Films have been made in Boston since as early as 1903, and it continues to be both a popular setting and a popular filming location.

A number of films have been set in Boston or Greater Boston:

- 21, a fictionalized account of the very-unofficial MIT Blackjack Team
- Altered States, Ken Russell film based on Paddy Chayefsky's novel
- The Beekeeper, about a "retired" member of a secret organization fighting to take down a phishing operation
- Between the Lines
- Black Mass, about the criminal career of infamous Irish-American mobster Whitey Bulger
- Blown Away, depicts the Boston Bomb Squad dealing with a mad bomber
- Blue Hill Avenue, about four childhood friends from Dorchester who grow up to become drug dealers
- The Boondock Saints, about two Irish immigrant brothers in Boston who become vigilantes
- The Boondock Saints II: All Saints Day, sequel to The Boondock Saints, in which the brothers are forced to return to Boston
- The Bostonians
- The Brink's Job, about the famous robbery of the Brinks security transport in the North End
- Celtic Pride, about two diehard Boston Celtics fans
- Charly, based on Flowers for Algernon, about a mentally challenged man who receives treatment for his disability
- A Civil Action, about several families who attempt to sue a company for dumping toxic waste that gave their children leukemia; filmed all over Boston, ironically not in Woburn, where it takes place, but in Palmer
- Coma is set at the fictional Boston Memorial Hospital
- The Company Men, starring Ben Affleck, Chris Cooper, Tommy Lee Jones and Kevin Costner
- The Core, in an early scene, people with pacemakers mysteriously drop dead during Green World Day; it is later known that the core stopped rotating
- The Departed, Martin Scorsese's 2006 hit film, takes place in Boston, with prominent use of Boston landmarks and culture; winner of the Academy Award for Best Picture
- Dirty Tricks, 1981 film starring Elliott Gould as a Harvard professor involved in an historical crime caper
- Edge of Darkness, 2010 crime thriller starring Mel Gibson
- The Equalizer, starring Denzel Washington
- The 2005 remake of Fever Pitch, about a man's obsession with the Boston Red Sox
- Field of Dreams, Ray Kinsella's journey takes him through Boston to fetch Terence Mann and attend a game at Fenway Park.
- The Firm, film's opening takes place at Harvard
- The Forbidden Kingdom, martial arts comedy-drama about a Boston boy who enters a Chinese fantasy world, with Jet Li and Jackie Chan
- The Friends of Eddie Coyle, drama about an aging mob gun runner from Quincy who has to choose whether or not to inform on his Irish Mob friends to avoid jail time
- Fuzz, detectives from Boston's 87th Precinct's investigate a murder-extortion racket run by a mysterious deaf man
- The Game Plan
- Godzilla: King of the Monsters (2019 film), in which the climactic kaiju battle starts in Fenway Park and destroys Boston
- Gone Baby Gone, directed by Ben Affleck, takes place and was filmed in Boston
- Good Will Hunting, takes place in Boston: the characters live in South Boston, and some other action is set at Harvard and M.I.T.
- The Handmaid's Tale, set in the Harvard Square area
- Harvard Man, a basketball player strikes a deal with the mob to fix a basketball game
- The Heat, a comedy starring Sandra Bullock based in Boston
- Heaven's Gate, exterior Harvard scenes filmed at Oxford University
- Hollow Point (1996)
- Home Before Dark (1958), set in Boston and Cape Cod; adapted from the novel by Eileen Bassing; original negative is lost
- House of the Damned, all of the interior shots were done in the house of the director, Sean Weathers, in Brooklyn, New York; however, Weathers wanted a different feel for the exteriors so he and his cinematographer drove to Boston to reshoot the exteriors months later without the actors
- The House of Magic takes place in Boston and its hospital.
- Housesitter
- Ice Princess, takes place in Worcester, MA around the Greater Boston area, about a physics geek who dreams of becoming a professional ice skater and gets an offer to go to Harvard but turns down that offer
- Johnny Tremain, 1957 Disney film based on the novel of the same name
- Knight and Day, starring Tom Cruise and Cameron Diaz
- Knowing
- The Last Detail, about two United States Navy policemen who decide to take out a young sailor for one last night on the town (through Boston's Combat Zone) before he goes to jail
- The Last Hurrah
- Legally Blonde, about a UCLA Valley Girl who attempts to get her boyfriend back by entering Harvard Law School
- Lemony Snicket's A Series of Unfortunate Events, takes place in Boston, as seen on the envelope at the end of the movie; "28 Prospero Place, Boston, Massachusetts, USA"
- Little Children, set in a fictional suburb of Boston
- Looking Good by Keith Maillard set in 1969/70 with vivid account of Harvard Square riot
- Love Story
- Malcolm X, Malcolm's Boston years are chronicled in this film, including his prison years, which led to his eventual conversion to Islam
- The Matchmaker
- Mona Lisa Smile, featuring Julia Roberts as a nonconformist Wellesley College professor
- Moneyball, featuring Brad Pitt, has a scene at Fenway Park in Boston
- Monument Ave., about low level Charlestown gangsters dealing with the repercussions that arise due to the code of silence
- Motet by Keith Maillard
- My Best Friend's Girl
- Mystery Street
- Mystic River, Oscar-winning drama about three childhood friends who later reunite after the murder of one of their daughters; set in a fictional area of Boston called "Buckingham Flats"; filmed in East Boston and South Boston
- The Next Karate Kid, primary scenes are set in the Boston area; filmed partly in Newton
- Next Stop Wonderland, takes place in Boston; the MBTA's Wonderland station takes special significance
- Night School
- Now, Voyager
- Once Around
- The Paper Chase, about a student struggling through Harvard Law School, based on the 1970 novel; John Houseman won an Oscar for his role as Professor Kingsfield
- Patriots Day (film)
- The Proposal
- Prozac Nation, about a young woman who struggles with depression during her first year at Harvard
- Sacco and Vanzetti, about the famous anarchists convicted of murder
- Shutter Island, thriller starring Leonardo DiCaprio, takes place on an island in Boston Harbor
- A Small Circle of Friends, about Harvard in the 1960s and three students bonding together
- The Social Network, drama about the creation of Facebook; many scenes are set on the Harvard campus
- Soul Man, comedy about a man who poses as a black scholarship winner in order to attend Harvard Law School
- Southie, drama about a man who returns to Southie after leaving for several years to get away from the violence of the gangster life
- Spotlight, fact-based drama about the Boston Globe's investigation of the abuses of the Catholic Church.
- The Spanish Prisoner
- Starting Over, romantic comedy starring Burt Reynolds about a recent divorcee who relocates to Boston to restart his life
- Still We Believe: The Boston Red Sox Movie, a documentary chronicling the 2003 baseball season of the Boston Red Sox
- Stonados, a Sci-Fi Channel television movie about Boston being ravaged by a rain of exploding rocks (starting with Plymouth Rock) from a freak meteorological event
- The Story of Alexander Graham Bell
- Surrogates, futuristic police thriller starring Bruce Willis
- Ted (2012) and Ted 2 (2015), starring Mark Wahlberg
- The Thomas Crown Affair (1968), about a wealthy businessman who robs banks for excitement
- Titicut Follies, documentary about Bridgewater State Hospital near Boston, and the lives of its mental patients
- The Town, starring Ben Affleck
- The Verdict, legal drama about an alcoholic Boston lawyer
- Vig (Money Kings), about an honest man who has to become a bookie
- Walk East on Beacon!
- War of the Worlds, film adaptation of the novel; the film ends with Tom Cruise and his kids finally reaching Boston where his ex-wife lives
- What Doesn't Kill You (2008) South Boston Irish mob crime drama.
- What's the Worst That Could Happen?, about a rich man who catches a thief burglarizing his Boston home and steals the thief's lucky ring, which the thief then tries to get back
- What's Your Number?, starring Chris Evans and Anna Faris
- With Honors (1994), with Brendan Fraser and Joe Pesci, about a Harvard student who loses the only copy of his thesis and traces it to a basement where it has been found by a homeless man who trades pages of the thesis for food and shelter
- X2: X-Men United, X-Men sequel, in which two scenes take place in Boston, the home of Bobby Drake, alias Iceman
- Yellow Lights, college drama that takes place at Wellesley College as well as a fictional college set in Newton
- Zookeeper, shot at Boston's Franklin Park Zoo

== Other ==
- An unaired episode of the Adult Swim animated television series Aqua Teen Hunger Force, "Boston", makes reference to Boston, as it satires the 2007 Boston bomb scare.

== See also ==
- Bibliography of Boston
