= Fatal Cure =

Novel by Robin Cook

- First edition (US)
- Author: Robin Cook
- Cover artist: Larry Rostant
- Language: English
- Genre: Thriller
- Publisher: Putnam (US); Macmillan (UK)
- Publication date: 1993
- Media type: Print ()
- Pages: 447
- ISBN: 0-330-33702-5
- OCLC: 60237515
- Preceded by: Blindsight
- Followed by: Acceptable Risk

Fatal Cure is a medical thriller written by Robin Cook.

== Plot ==
Fatal Cure tells the story of two young doctors Angela and David Wilson, with their 9-year-old daughter who has a chronic disease, cystic fibrosis, who are lured to a small town in Vermont to start a career. David gets a job as an internist with the local HMO, while Angela gets an offer from the local hospital as a pathologist. The story takes aim at managed care and health maintenance organizations.

David and Angela quickly find out that their idyllic town harbors dark secrets. Patients at the local hospital keep dying prematurely. The hospital grounds are terrorized by a rapist, and the young family is shocked to find a dead body in their basement. Angela is faced with sexual harassment and David soon experiences the wrath of the HMO administrators for spending too much time with his patients and ordering too many tests and hospital stays.

David and Angela end up not just getting fired from their jobs -and deeply in debt, but their lives are threatened as well. The novel ends with a dénouement somewhat similar to Silence of the Lambs.
