= Invasion (Cook novel) =

Novel by Robin Cook

- First edition
- Author: Robin Cook
- Language: English
- Genre: Medical thriller
- Publisher: Berkley Books
- Publication date: 1997
- Publication place: United States
- Media type: Print (Hardback & Paperback)
- Pages: 393 pp
- ISBN: 0-330-35288-1
- OCLC: 39837167
- Preceded by: Chromosome 6
- Followed by: Toxin

Invasion is a 1997 thriller novel by American author Robin Cook. The book was adapted into the 1997 miniseries of the same name.

== Plot ==
Small rocks fall from the sky which, when touched, trigger a latent virus that has always existed in humans and begins mutating them into an alien species. Taking advantage of its hive mentality, the aliens are dedicated to transforming every human on Earth and do so with alarming swiftness. Only a small group of remaining humans have the medical knowledge to devise antibodies to reverse the effects of the virus.
