= Mortal Fear =

Mortal Fear may refer to:

- Mortal Fear (Ciencin and Ciencin novel), a 2003 novel by Scott Ciencin and Denise Ciencin, based on the American television series Buffy the Vampire Slayer
- Mortal Fear (Cook novel), a 1988 novel by Robin Cook
