= Invasion (miniseries) =

1997 miniseries directed by Armand Mastroianni

- Genre: Science Fiction; Thriller
- Based on: Invasion by Robin Cook
- Written by: Rockne S. O'Bannon
- Directed by: Armand Mastroianni
- Starring: Luke Perry; Kim Cattrall; Rebecca Gayheart; Christopher Orr
- Theme music composer: Don Davis
- Country of origin: United States
- Original language: English
- No. of episodes: 2

Production
- Executive producers: Frank von Zerneck; Robert M. Sertner; Stacy Mandelberg
- Producers: Jeffrey Morton; Randy Sutter
- Production locations: Mesa, Arizona; Phoenix, Arizona; Coolidge, Arizona
- Cinematography: Bryan England
- Editor: Scott Vickrey
- Running time: 175 min.
- Production companies: Hallmark Entertainment; Von Zerneck Sertner Films

Original release
- Network: NBC
- Release: May 4 – May 5, 1997

Invasion is a 1997 miniseries based on the novel of the same name by Robin Cook. It starred Luke Perry, Kim Cattrall and Rebecca Gayheart.

== Plot ==
Small rocks fall from the sky which, when touched, trigger a latent virus that has always existed in humans and begins mutating them into an alien species. Taking advantage of its hive mentality, the aliens are absolutely dedicated to transforming every human on Earth and do so with alarming swiftness. Only a small group of remaining humans have the medical knowledge to devise antibodies to reverse the effects of the virus.

== Cast ==
- Luke Perry as Beau Stark
- Kim Cattrall as Dr. Sheila Moran
- Rebecca Gayheart as Cassy Winthrope
- Christopher Orr as Pitt Henderson
- Jon Polito as Detective Kemper
- Neal McDonough as Randy North
- Rosanna DeSoto as Nancy Ochoa
- Cástulo Guerra as Eugene Ochoa
- Michael Warren as Dr. Harlan McCoy
- Chuck McCann as chairman of health committee
- Tim DeKay as Mike Landry
- Jason Schombing as Assistant Detective
- John Finn as Colonel Brown (not credited)

== Awards ==
- Saturn Award
  - Saturn Award for best TV series 1998
- ALMA Awards
- Motion Picture Sound Editors
  - Best Sound Editing in a TV movie 1998
