= Coma (American miniseries) =

2012 US medical thriller miniseries by Mikael Salomon

- Genre: Medical thriller
- Based on: Coma by Robin Cook
- Teleplay by: John J. McLaughlin
- Directed by: Mikael Salomon
- Starring: Lauren Ambrose; Steven Pasquale; Geena Davis; James Woods; Ellen Burstyn; Richard Dreyfuss; James Rebhorn; Joe Morton; Michael Weston; Joseph Mazzello
- Composer: David Buckley
- Country of origin: United States
- Original language: English
- No. of episodes: 2

Production
- Executive producers: Ridley Scott; Tony Scott; David W. Zucker; Martin Erlichman; Mikael Salomon
- Running time: 240 minutes (both parts with commercials)
- Production companies: Sony Pictures Television; Warner Bros. Television; Scott Free Productions; Turner Entertainment Co. (uncredited, copyright holder)

Original release
- Network: A&E
- Release: September 3 – September 4, 2012

Coma is a 2012 American television miniseries based on the 1977 novel Coma by Robin Cook, which had previously been adapted into a 1978 film. The four-hour medical thriller was originally broadcast on A&E on September 3–4, 2012.

The series was directed by Mikael Salomon and produced by Ridley Scott and his brother Tony Scott, the same team that adapted The Andromeda Strain into the 2008 miniseries on A&E. It is dedicated to Tony Scott, who died in August 2012, only weeks before its broadcast premiere.

== Plot ==
Susan Wheeler is a first-year medical student at Atlanta's Peach Tree Memorial Hospital, built by her deceased grandfather. There she meets Chief Surgical Resident Dr. Mark Bellows, who is in a romantic relationship with Head of Psychiatry Dr. Agnetta Lindquist. Wheeler discovers that an unusually high number of surgeries at the hospital have resulted in comas. Those patients are transferred to the Jefferson Institute, a long-term care facility for comatose patients run by Mrs. Emerson, who refers to the patients as her "babies".

With help from Dr. Bellows (and soon Dr. Theodore Stark, Chief of Surgery), Wheeler investigates the comas. Before long, strange incidents seemingly happen to stop her investigation: her roommate, who works at the hospital and who helped her to access confidential files, is suddenly fired; the hospital board tries to have Wheeler expelled; and she discovers cameras in her house. She is also being stalked by Peter Arno, Dr. Lindquist's patient, who seems to be following Wheeler at Lindquist's behest. During one encounter, Arno puts a burlap sack over Wheeler's head and warns her to stop looking into the coma cases or else end up at Jefferson.

Wheeler attends a tour at the Jefferson Institute. She leaves the group and discovers unorthodox practices, such as suspending patients by metal rods inserted into their bones. She contacts Dr. Stark with evidence, but before he can expose the conspiracy, he is in a car accident and is comatose. Wheeler and Dr. Bellows—who ended his relationship with Dr. Lindquist after suspecting her involvement—discover that various hospital staff and doctors receive large payments from Jefferson. They further discover that each coma patient was operated on in the same operating room, in which a pipe from the basement pumps carbon monoxide into the anesthesia equipment, rendering a patient brain dead without leaving evidence. Arno attempts to kill Wheeler, but when he fails, he slits his own throat inside a cadaver storage cooler.

Wheeler is captured and taken to Jefferson to be placed into a coma. Wheeler, heavily sedated, breaks free and attempts to escape while hallucinating that she is under water. As she flees, she learns the truth - the Jefferson Institute is a human experimentation laboratory and human organ farm. Jefferson collaborates with Peach Tree Memorial to induce comas in select patients, using their bodies for harvesting organs, inducing pregnancy for fetal umbilical stem cells, and as human test subjects. Susan encounters Professor Hillside, her medical school professor, who says that he and her late grandfather, Dr. Wheeler, masterminded the Jefferson Institute, making it their legacy. Wheeler is revolted that this barbarism is being conducted in the name of medical advancement.

Meanwhile, Dr. Bellows and police detective Jackson (who is investigating Wheeler being stalked and Arno's death) both end up at Dr. Stark's residence. Doctors have gathered there to memorialize Stark, who died during surgery a few hours earlier. Dr. Nelson, head of anesthesiology and part of the conspiracy, is seemingly guilt-ridden. He tells Jackson and Dr. Bellows that Wheeler is being held at the Jefferson Institute. The police and Dr. Bellows arrive at the institute and witness the horror. They arrest Professor Hillside, and Dr. Bellows discovers Wheeler, who fatally stabbed Mrs. Emerson with a syringe in self-defense and then escaped through a drain.

The miniseries ends with Wheeler awake in a hospital and Dr. Bellows by her side. She says she had a terrible dream of being under water and unable to get out. Dr. Bellows says it was just a dream and then receives a text message with a picture of Dr. Lindquist, asking him to join her at a hospital in China. Dr. Bellows looks at Susan and repeats, "It was just a dream."

== Cast ==
- Lauren Ambrose as Susan Wheeler, Medical School student trainee at Peach Tree Memorial Hospital
- Steven Pasquale as Dr. Mark Bellows, Chief Surgical Resident at Peach Tree Memorial Hospital
- Geena Davis as Dr. Agnetta Lindquist, Head of Psychiatry at Peach Tree Memorial Hospital
- James Woods as Dr. Theodore Stark, Chief of Surgery at Peach Tree Memorial Hospital
- Ellen Burstyn as Mrs. Emerson, Head of Operations at the Jefferson Institute
- Richard Dreyfuss as Professor Hillside, Professor at Atlanta University
- James Rebhorn as Oren
- Joe Morton as Dr. Nelson, head of Anesthesiology at Peach Tree Memorial Hospital
- Michael Weston as Peter Arno
- Joseph Mazzello as Geoffrey Fairweather
- Brian J. Smith as Paul Carpin
- Natalie Knepp as Hanna Goldberg
- Erin Beute as Liza
- Burgess Jenkins as Sean Berman
- Ron Clinton Smith as Maguire
- Wilbur Fitzgerald as Police Captain
- Mike Pniewski as Detective Jackson
- Cal Johnson as Coma Victim #1

== Production ==
Coma was filmed in Atlanta, Georgia, in December 2011.

== Reception ==
=== Ratings ===
The first two hours, first broadcast on September 3, 2012, were watched by 1.82 million viewers and received a 0.5 rating among viewers aged 18–49. The final two hours, first shown on September 4, 2012, were watched by 1.52 million viewers and received a 0.5 18–49 rating.

=== Critical reception ===
Coma was met with generally mixed reviews. On review aggregator website Rotten Tomatoes, the miniseries holds a 50% score, an average rating of 4/10 taken from reviews from 20 critics. Its consensus states: "Coma evokes some creepy images but the majority of the miniseries is not believable in terms of story development, dialogue, or performances." The miniseries received a 56 out of 100 aggregate score, based on 16 critics, indicating "mixed or average reviews" reception at Metacritic. Clark Collis of Entertainment Weekly gave it a B grade, but added, "Alas, there are enough reminders of real life—including an early suicide—to dampen the fun of this guilty pleasure." Verne Gay of Newsday also gave it a B and stated, "The plot's ridiculous, but the film's mostly fun, while the pleasure of watching Ellen Burstyn play a homicidal wacko is not to be denied anyone." David Hinckley of the New York Daily News stated, "This Coma is different enough from the 1978 movie to have its own appeal, and the cast keeps things interesting even during plot lulls." Linda Stasi of the New York Post called the miniseries "very lame" and "dopey", adding, "The mystery is pretty much laid out like a coma patient from the beginning [and] ruins whatever suspense you might otherwise have built up."

== DVD release ==
Sony Pictures Home Entertainment released the miniseries on DVD on October 30, 2012.

== International broadcasts ==
On 6 June 2013, Channel 5 in the United Kingdom broadcast the miniseries as an extended-length film.

From September 7 to October 28, 2012, the miniseries was bought by NBCUniversal International Networks’s Utca 13 in Hungary.
