= Toxin (novel) =

Novel by Robin Cook

- First edition cover
- Author: Robin Cook
- Language: English
- Genre: Thriller, Novel
- Publisher: G. P. Putnam's Sons
- Publication date: 31 December 1998
- Publication place: United States
- Media type: Print (hardback & paperback)
- Pages: 357 pp (hardback edition)
- ISBN: 0-399-14316-5 (hardback edition)
- OCLC: 38130759
- Dewey Decimal: 813/.54 21
- LC Class: PS3553.O5545 T69 1998
- Preceded by: Invasion
- Followed by: Vector

Toxin is a 1998 suspense thriller written by Robin Cook. It tells the story of a doctor whose daughter is infected with E. coli and his investigation into how she contracted it and his battle to save her life and discover the source of her illness.

== Plot summary ==
The book opens with a scene showing a couple of farmhands who are entrusted with disposing of a diseased cow. However they instead take it to a nearby slaughter house and sell it.

The story then moves to the protagonist Dr. Kim Reggis who is going through a bad divorce. On a night out with his daughter Becky, he takes her to the nearby fast food chain, Onion Ring Burgers. There she eats a rare steak burger. The beef in the burger is revealed to have come from the cow mentioned at the start of the book. The next day Becky begins having loose motions and severe body pain. Kim and his estranged wife Tracy rush her into the emergency care unit of the hospital he works in. However he is ignored there which infuriates him. The doctors confirm that she has been infected by E. coli's renegade strain O157:H7 which is resistant to most antibiotics. Becky's condition begin to deteriorate rapidly.

Feeling helpless at his inability to save his daughter's life, Kim makes it his mission to trace out how she contracted the disease. He first makes a visit to the restaurant they ate at, only managing to create a ruckus there. However he learns that the beef came from Mercer Meats. He traces the slaughterhouse and manages to take the U.S. Department of Agriculture inspector in his confidence. The next day Becky dies of multiple organ failure leaving him in sorrow and strengthening his resolve for justice. He infiltrates the slaughterhouse with the help of his ex-wife by changing his appearance to make him look like a jobless Punk rocker. He accepts a job as a janitor. On his first day at work, he gets into the records room and finds out the truth about the diseased animal. They are attacked by an assassin. Tracy appears and kills the assassin. They then escape from the slaughterhouse and flee the country after making public the malpractices committed by the slaughterhouse.

== Major themes ==
The novel discusses the issue of malpractices committed by the slaughterhouses in order to maximize profits. It also demonstrates the collusion of government officials with these organizations and calls for much tougher laws to prevent malpractices. It also attracts the reader's attention to the great dangers presented by artificial strains of E. coli like O157:H7 which causes around twenty thousand deaths a year.

== Reviews ==
- "Cook Preys on Parents' Worst Fears". Rocky Mountain News. Denver, CO. May 3, 1998. Archived from the original on November 3, 2012 – via HighBeam Research.
- Reed, Stephen G. (March 25, 1998). "Naples' Robin Cook, Author Of Best-selling Medical Thrillers, Takes On the Meat Industry". Sarasota Herald-Tribune.
- Levins, Harry (March 22, 1998). "UNHAPPILY, DOC WRITES LIKE - A DOC". St. Louis Post-Dispatch.
