= Acceptable Risk =

Acceptable Risk may refer to:

- Acceptable risk
- Acceptable Risk (novel), a 1995 novel by Robin Cook
- Acceptable Risk (film), a 2001 American TV film directed by William A. Graham
- Acceptable Risk (TV series), a 2017 Irish television series
