= Mutation (novel) =

Novel by Robin Cook

- First edition (US)
- Author: Robin Cook
- Language: English
- Genre: Thriller novel
- Publisher: Putnam (US); Macmillan (UK)
- Publication date: 1989
- Publication place: United States
- Media type: Print (Hardback & Paperback)
- Preceded by: Mortal Fear
- Followed by: Harmful Intent

Mutation is a novel by Robin Cook about the ethics of genetic engineering.

== Plot ==
Victor Frank and his wife Marsha, unable to have a second child due to Marsha's infertility, turn to surrogacy as an alternate method of conception. Victor, an obstetrician-gynaecologist and owner of the biochemical company Chimera Inc., injects the egg implanted in his wife with an agent called Nerve Growth Factor (NGF) into chromosome six, which causes the baby to grow more neurons than usual, as a result heightening its intelligence. Their son, V.J. (Victor Junior), is born a child prodigy, but Victor wonders if his experiment was a mistake.

Several years later, V.J.'s brother David, and nanny Janice, both die of an unexplainable rare form of liver cancer. At age 3, V.J. experiences a drop in intelligence, leading Victor to think his experiment is a failure. When V.J. turns eleven, a disastrous chain of events begins. Victor had injected two other eggs with NGF, which were given to two families who work at Chimera through their fertility clinic. Both children inexplicably die at age 3 due to brain edema. Victor later finds out they had been given the antibiotic Cephaloclor, which caused the nerve cell growth process to restart and made their brains to grow too large for their skulls, killing them.

Victor launches an investigation into the deaths, finding no explanation for how they got the antibiotic. He also insists on V.J. getting a full neurological work-up, making Marsha suspicious. He eventually reveals his experiment to Marsha, horrifying her. Marsha, a psychiatrist, then gives V.J. a full psychological work-up as well. The results do not seem out of the ordinary, but Marsha realizes the results don't seem to reflect V.J.'s real personality, leading her to believe that he analyzed the tests and beat them. Meanwhile, Victor the DNA of the tumors that killed David and Janice analyzed. When the DNA is sequenced, there is an identical strand of alien DNA in both of them.

Victor then goes looking for V.J., who spends a lot of time at his father's laboratory, and sees him head under an old clock tower on the Chimera campus. Victor soon finds himself inside a laboratory built by V.J., where he has solved many of the biochemical problems Victor had been researching. Victor is amazed by his son's genius, and rushes to show Marsha. She reacts differently and is worried, especially about a cordoned-off section of the lab V.J. didn't show them.

V.J.'s parents come back the next day and insist that he show them the rest of the lab. In one room, V.J. is growing fetuses–the five eggs from Marsha that had not been implanted–in artificial wombs. V.J. tells them that there is no fifth fetus because of a failed implantation attempt, and that he has altered the babies to make them intellectually disabled so they won't be more intelligent than him. He also reveals that he killed the other two children who had been injected with NGF for the same reason. Not only this, but he also used the method he had previously used for injecting cancer into kill David, Janice and a teacher who was prying into his life.

In another room, V.J. shows his horrified parents tanks full of E. coli genetically altered to produce cocaine, which he sold to Colombian drug dealers to finance his research. He then insists that his parents tell him whether they will try to turn him in. Marsha convinces V.J. to leave her and Victor to talk alone, and they reluctantly decide to kill their son. V.J. agrees to release Victor on the conditions that Marsha stay in the lab as a hostage, and that Victor must have a guard with him at all times. Victor takes the guard back to his house and drugs him. He then synthesizes nitroglycerin and constructs a bomb, planting it in a tunnel by V.J.'s lab.

Victor convinces V.J. to release Marsha, and stalls V.J. until the bomb goes off, causing the gates redirecting a river under the clock tower to break. V.J. rushes for the exit, but Victor stops him discovering that, ironically, despite the fact V.J.'s mind is beyond his years, he still has the strength of a ten-year-old. Victor holds him down until the lab floods, killing them both.

One year later, a mother brings in her teenage daughter and her daughter's child to Marsha's office. Marsha quickly surmises from the fact that the 18-month child is the "failed" zygote. She decides she will have to "end forever the nightmare her husband had begun".
