= Shock (novel) =

Novel by Robin Cook

- Author: Robin Cook
- Language: English
- Genre: Science fiction novel
- Publisher: G. P. Putnam's Sons, Macmillan and Pan Books
- Publication date: 2001
- Publication place: United States
- Media type: Print (paperback)
- Pages: 404 (paperback edition)
- ISBN: 0-330-48305-6 (paperback edition)
- OCLC: 49550425
- Preceded by: Abduction
- Followed by: Seizure

Shock is a novel written by Robin Cook in 2001. It is a medical science fiction woven around a fertility clinic that uses unethical means to get rich.

== Plot introduction ==
The novel is about two friends Deborah Cochrane and Joanna Meissner, both of whom are shown equally as protagonists. Joanna dumps her boyfriend Carlton Williams and finds herself in need of money to complete her studies. Her friend Deborah shows her a newspaper article about Wingate Clinic that is offering $45,000 for people willing to donate their eggs for infertile patients. The two friends decide to take the offer and donate the eggs. Everything goes on peacefully till they complete their doctorate studies and come back to USA. Here their curiosity gets the better of them and they decide to find out what happened to their eggs. With the Wingate Clinic maintaining a strict silence about their working, the two of them decide to use some unfair means to get this information.

== Plot summary ==
Using the help of a hacker friend, Joanna and Deborah try to break into the online records of Wingate Clinic, but are met with failure as it was a very well-protected system. They then decide to get the inside information by first getting in posing as prospective employees. They use Social Security Numbers of recently deceased women to forge their identity and get employed in the clinic. Joanna (under the alias of Prudence Heatherly) gets work as a word processing employee while Deborah (under the alias of Georgina Marks) gets a job of a lab assistant.

In order to get access to the high-security data, they steal the Access Card of Wingate Clinic's owner, Spencer Wingate, by giving him an overdose of liquor. Using the Access Card, they gain (un)authorized entry into the Server Room, from where the records are managed. Unfortunately for them, as all movements into the Server Room, as well as the changes made in the file system, are logged, their identity gets revealed. In parallel, they find out that while Joanna was subjected to organ theft, the Clinic illegally performs ovary culture (on stem cells) on all the stolen eggs as well as uses many workers as surrogate mothers.

From here starts the chase where the Wingate Clinic's officers try to kill the women while they try to save their lives and bring Wingate's ill-deeds to the knowledge of the world.

The novel has an open ending, leaving the readers to guess what happens to the villains in the end.

== Characters ==
- Deborah Cochrane – main character (alias of Georgina Marks)
- Joanna Meissner – main character (alias of Prudence Heatherly)
- Carlton Williams – Joanna's boyfriend (becomes ex')

== Major themes ==
The major theme of the book is the issue of cloning and organ theft as possible unethical means, left unchecked by society, to give a chance for people to make quick money. Although the author himself doesn't specifically mention this, the message from this book is clear that the author considers it wrong for people to use these means. The author uses this as a creative possibility for a thriller medical science fiction novel.

The other creative possibility used by the author as a new method of doing fraud is identity theft, although in this novel, the author specifically uses the possibility of identity theft from recently deceased people whose records don't get updated quickly.

== References to current science ==
This novel discusses the issue of Bioethics ( ethics of cloning and stem cell research) in a quite involved manner and uses it as a base of science fiction novel. The author, in an interview, stated that he used this topic specifically to give the readers an insight into this new and quite unknown field. Quite evidently, the author has used a current science and technology related topic to build a thriller.
