= Godplayer =

Novel by Robin Cook

- First edition
- Author: Robin Cook
- Language: English
- Genre: Thriller, Novel
- Publisher: Putnam (US); Macmillan (UK)
- Publication date: May 1983
- Publication place: United States
- Media type: Print (Paperback & Hardback)
- Pages: 285 pp
- ISBN: 0-425-17638-X
- OCLC: 45147758
- Preceded by: Fever
- Followed by: Mindbend

Godplayer is a novel by Robin Cook. It was first released in 1983 in the UK and United States. It has 285 pages. Like most of Cook's other work, it is a medical thriller. Working with her husband, a respected cardiac surgeon, at Boston Memorial is a dream come true for Dr. Cassandra Kingsley—until a series of mysterious deaths rocks the hospital and Cassandra's most frightening suspicions are realized. Amidst a hospital power struggle that pits resident doctors against private practitioners, eighteen cardiac surgery patients mysteriously die. Doctors Cassandra Kingsley and Robert Seibert investigate the deaths, making disturbing discoveries, such as a drug-taking, knife-happy surgeon and lethal IVs.
