= Marker (novel) =

Novel by Robin Cook

- Author: Robin Cook
- Cover artist: Getty Images
- Language: English
- Genre: Thriller, novel
- Publisher: G. P. Putnam's Sons
- Publication date: 2005
- Publication place: United States
- Media type: Print
- Pages: 598
- ISBN: 978-0-330-48307-0
- OCLC: 64594701
- Preceded by: Seizure
- Followed by: Crisis

Marker is a 2005 thriller novel by Robin Cook.
