= Outbreak (novel) =

1987 novel by Robin Cook

- First edition (US)
- Author: Robin Cook
- Cover artist: David O'Connor
- Language: English
- Publisher: Putnam (US); Macmillan (UK)
- Publication date: 1987
- Media type: Print
- Pages: 366
- ISBN: 9780425106877
- Preceded by: Mindbend
- Followed by: Mortal Fear

Outbreak is a 1987 medical thriller novel written by Robin Cook. It follows Dr. Marissa Blumenthal, an epidemiologist who was researching an Ebola virus outbreak in the United States. As she investigated the origin and spread of the virus, she uncovers that all is not what it seems to be. In 1995, a made-for-television film adaptation of the book titled "Robin Cook's Virus" (later renamed Formula for Death), was released starring Nicollette Sheridan and William Devane. This television film is unrelated to the 1995 theatrical film Outbreak, which has a similar plot.

== Synopsis ==
When the director of a Los Angeles health maintenance clinic dies from an untreatable and aggressive virus that also kills seven of his patients, the Centers for Disease Control (CDC) in Atlanta responds with a state of high alert. The CDC assigns epidemiologist Dr. Marissa Blumenthal to investigate. What initially appears to be a localized health scare quickly expands as similar outbreaks occur in unrelated geographical areas across the country. Each outbreak shares commonalities: the locations are always health-care facilities and the victims are exclusively physicians and their patients.

As the death toll rises, Blumenthal uncovers clues that suggest deliberate human involvement. Her investigation takes her into the medical and pharmaceutical world.

== Publication information ==
- Cook, Robin. (1987) Outbreak. ISBN 9780425106877
