= Brain (novel) =

Novel by Robin Cook

- First edition
- Author: Robin Cook
- Language: English
- Genre: Thriller
- Publisher: Putnam
- Publication date: February 1981
- Publication place: United States
- Media type: Print (hardback & paperback)
- Pages: 320 pp
- ISBN: 0-451-15797-4
- OCLC: 25106913
- Preceded by: Sphinx
- Followed by: Fever

Brain is a best-selling medical thriller written by Robin Cook, published by Putnam in 1981. It describes how a future generation of computers will work hard-wired to human brains.

Cook based the main character, radiology resident Katherine Collins, on his wife Barbara Mougin, an actress-model.

== Plot ==
The story starts with a girl Katherine Collins going to a private clinic for a pap smear, but these people anesthetize her and steal her brain for a secret military project. She is placed in a vat of liquid and her brain is connected to a computer. The same thing happens to other patients too.

The protagonist Dr. Martin Philips, a doctor in neuroradiology at the NYC medical center is involved in creating a self-diagnostic x-ray machine, along with William Michaels, who is a researcher graduating from MIT and also head of the department of artificial intelligence. Dr. Philips's girlfriend and colleague Dr. Denise Sanger (28 years old) is also involved in the same hospital. Philips and Sanger both find a secret conspiracy in the hospital to steal patients' brains without their consent. They uncover details and find that though they'd suspected Mannerheim, the prima donna neurosurgeon, the real villain is the soft-spoken AI researcher Michaels and his military backers. Dr. Philips blows the whistle and seeks political asylum in Sweden.

== Reception ==
A review in Library Journal said that following the discovery of a missing brain, "The subsequent search, chase, and revelation provide undeniably irresistible and exciting reading."
