= For Pete's Sake (film) =

1974 film by Peter Yates

- DVD cover
- Directed by: Peter Yates
- Written by: Stanley Shapiro; Maurice Richlin
- Produced by: Martin Erlichman; Stanley Shapiro
- Starring: Barbra Streisand; Michael Sarrazin; Estelle Parsons
- Cinematography: László Kovács
- Edited by: Frank P. Keller
- Music by: Artie Butler
- Production company: Rastar
- Distributed by: Columbia Pictures
- Release date: June 26, 1974 (United States)
- Running time: 90 minutes
- Country: United States
- Language: English
- Budget: $4-5 million
- Box office: $11 million (US/Canada rentals)

For Pete's Sake is a 1974 American screwball comedy film starring Barbra Streisand and directed by Peter Yates. The screenplay by Stanley Shapiro and Maurice Richlin chronicles the misadventures of a Brooklyn housewife. In 1977, it was used as the basis for the Hindi film Aap Ki Khatir.

== Plot ==
Henrietta and Pete Robbins are a young couple in Brooklyn struggling to get by on the income he earns as a cab driver. His pompous sister-in-law Helen delights in reminding them that an early marriage robbed him of a college education and how much better off she and her husband Fred are. When Pete gets an inside tip on pork belly futures, Henrietta borrows $3,000 from a Mafia loan shark to purchase the commodity. Unfortunately, its value doesn't increase as rapidly as she anticipated. When she's unable to pay her debt, her contract is sold to Mrs. Cherry, a grandmotherly-type who operates a prostitution ring. When Henrietta's initial attempts at entertaining clients prove to be less than successful, her contract is sold yet again...and again, as Henrietta fails to fulfill the requirements of each new individual to whom she becomes indebted — each time for more money — and tries to keep her new enterprises secret from her unsuspecting husband.

== Principal cast ==
- Barbra Streisand as Henrietta Robbins
- Michael Sarrazin as Pete Robbins
- Estelle Parsons as Helen Robbins
- William Redfield as Fred Robbins
- Richard Ward as Bernie
- Vivian Bonnell as Loretta
- Molly Picon as Mrs. Cherry
- Louis Zorich as Nick Kasabian
- Heywood Hale Broun as Judge Hiller
- Ed Bakey as Angelo
- Peter Mamakos as Dominic
- Joseph Maher as Mr. Coates
- Anne Ramsey as Telephone Lady
- Vincent Schiavelli as Check Out Man
- Sidney Miller as Drunk Driver
- Norman Marshall as First Worker
- Martin Erlichman as Man In Theatre
- Joe Pantoliano as Undercover Arresting Officer (Uncredited)

== Production ==
The film's original title was July Pork Bellies.

The title tune "For Pete's Sake (Don't Let Him Down)," was written by Artie Butler and Mark Lindsay, and sung by Barbra Streisand over the credits.

The movie was filmed on location in Brooklyn, New York, and Los Angeles. The suburban scene at Helen and Fred Robbins' house was filmed in Paramus, New Jersey.

Jon Peters designed Streisand's hairstyles, including a short wig.

== Critical reception ==
In his review in The New York Times, Vincent Canby called the film "an often boisterously funny old-time farce" and added "The movie may not hold together as any kind of larger comic statement, but the laughs are self-sustaining throughout...Miss Streisand's comedy range is narrow, like a cartoon character's, but For Pete's Sake operates almost entirely within that range. She's at her best in this kind of farce."
