= Alexander von Reisden =

- First appearance: The Vanished Child
- Last appearance: A Citizen of the Country
- Created by: Sarah Smith

In-universe information
- Gender: Male
- Occupation: Chemist
- Nationality: Austrian

Alexander von Reisden is a fictional character in a three book historical mystery series by Sarah Smith. The novels, set in turn of the 20th century Boston and pre-World War I Paris, are The Vanished Child (1992), The Knowledge of Water (1996), and A Citizen of the Country (2000).

== Overview ==
Reisden is an Austrian baron and chemist with an unexplained gap in his childhood memories. His 1905 return to America solves both the question of the murder of William Knight and the eighteen-year-old disappearance of Knight's grandson Richard.

Reisden discovers that he is, in fact, Richard Knight. His grandfather was physically abusive and Richard shot him. Unable to deal with what he had done, the child stowed away on a ship that was bound for Africa. There, he lived the life of a street child, sometimes sleeping under a bridge or working for a junk seller. At age 10, Reisden was discovered by Count Leo von Loewenstein, a wealthy Austrian aristocrat and diplomat who was looking for children with just such an uncertain background whom he could raise to spy on upper crust radicals. Reisden was given a new identity as Baron Alexander von Reisden, the son of an Austrian couple who emigrated to Africa and then died. Having forgotten his earlier identity as Richard Knight, he was educated as an Austrian aristocrat and juvenile spy. Eventually, he rebelled against his guardian, married an actress and became a chemist. After his wife died in a car accident, Reisden had a nervous breakdown and attempted to kill himself. A few years later, he was mistaken for Richard Knight and went to Boston. After the events of The Vanished Child, Reisden decides to keep silent about his newly discovered identity and returns to Paris, where he eventually marries Perdita Halley, a visually impaired pianist who is close to Gilbert Knight, Reisden's recently re-discovered uncle. But Reisden's uncle and other associates of the Knight family continue to intrude upon Reisden's life in Paris. He is called upon to solve other mysteries while he attempts to integrate his memories of Richard Knight with his life as Reisden.
