= King of Space =

Hypertext fiction work by Sarah Smith

- Cover of Macintosh edition
- Author: Sarah Smith
- Language: English
- Genre: Science fiction
- Published: 1991
- Publisher: Eastgate Systems, Inc.
- Publication place: United States
- Media type: Hypertext

King of Space: Reconstruction of a Narrative Game
- Author: Sarah Smith
- Language: English
- Genre: Science fiction
- Published: 2022
- Publication place: United States
- Media type: Hypertext
- Website: https://kingofspace.org/game/game.html

King of Space is a work of electronic literature by author Sarah Smith. This interactive narrative is set in a collapsing solar system aboard an abandoned starship, where an escaped terrorist encounters the last star-captain and his ship's Priestess. The story weaves elements of gaming into a dark science-fictional ritual of fertility and regeneration.

== Origins ==
=== King of Space ===
King of Space was influenced by the literary and digital landscape of the late 20th and early 21st centuries. Sarah Smith initiated the work in 1988 (text) and collaborated with Mark Bernstein (programming). Bernstein had developed Hypergate, an early hypertext system based on the Hypercard.

Published in 1991 by Eastgate Systems, Inc., the collaborative effort between writer and programmer contributed to the unique interactive nature of the narrative. During production, the creators saw King of Space as a test piece for technology and what could be possible when technology influences the narrative.

=== King of Space: Reconstruction of a Narrative Game ===
In 2022, students from the Washington State University at Vancouver Creative Media & Digital Culture (CMDC) program undertook a comprehensive reconstruction of the original 1991 game, called King of Space: Reconstruction of a Narrative Game. The reconstruction involved a ground-up overhaul, incorporating new art and illustrations, multiple mini-games, interactive environments, and complex gameplay, introducing more modern elements to the original gameplay loop.

== Plot ==
King of Space is set within the confines of an abandoned starship, known as the Greatship, amidst a plague-ridden and divided solar system. Tam Rosse, an escaped terrorist, repeatedly meets the last star captain and the enigmatic Priestess, with their relationships oscillating between adversaries, comrades, and lovers.

=== Characters ===
- Tam Rosse, the POV character for three out of the five stories
- Lady Nii, the intelligence of the Greatship
- King Brady, the last survivor of the Greatship
- Aster, a Priestess now on her first assignment

=== Story structure and navigation ===
The story initially follows a linear path, but continually presents readers with crossroads that lead to multiple branching paths, all determined by the reader's choices. As the narrative progresses, readers encounter pivotal decision points where their choices influence the direction of the story. The original version featured 317 screens of text and presented readers with 25 different possible endings.

== Literary significance and critical reception ==
Sarah Smith's King of Space has been stated as a notable example of early electronic literature and science fiction in the digital medium. It is also regarded for its innovation in blending text with animation, mazes, puzzles, and games, showcasing the possibilities of hypertext. Robert Coover, writing for The New York Times Book Review in 1993, reviewed King of Space and called it hypertextually innovative and interactive. Others have also gone on to say that the work defies conventional categorization, reflecting the distinct nature of digital storytelling, where the roles of author and reader are clearly differentiated.
