= Mindbend =

Novel by Robin Cook

- First edition
- Author: Robin Cook
- Cover artist: Norman Walker
- Language: English
- Genre: Thriller novel
- Publisher: Putnam (US); Macmillan (UK)
- Publication date: 1985
- Media type: Print (Hardback & Paperback)
- Pages: 254 pp
- ISBN: 0-330-29165-3
- OCLC: 14905727
- Preceded by: Godplayer
- Followed by: Outbreak

Mindbend is a novel by the American author Robin Cook. It first published in 1985 by Putnam in the United States, and by Macmillan in the United Kingdom.

== Plot ==
Arolen is a giant pharmaceutical company, expanding at rapid pace and bringing more and more doctors into its clutches. Once doctors go on CME on board a cruise organised by Arolen, they come back totally changed, in personality and opinions. Strangely many of them opt for a job in Julian Clinic, even at the cost of leaving their lucrative private practices. Incidentally, the number of therapeutic abortions at the Julian Clinic are also rising. The hero of the novel, Adam Schonberg, a third year medical student, has to leave his medical education midway for want of money as his wife becomes pregnant and later on trapped in the clutches of unethical medical practice. Adam finally succeeds in unraveling the mystery behind Arolem pharmaceuticals. They drug the doctors and later perform psychological surgery on them aboard the ship (Fjord) which makes them opt to join the Julian Clinic.
