= Sphinx (novel) =

Novel by Robin Cook

- First edition (US)
- Author: Robin Cook
- Language: English
- Genre: Thriller
- Publisher: Putnam (US); Macmillan (UK)
- Publication date: 1979
- Publication place: United States
- Media type: Print (paperback & hardback)
- ISBN: 0-330-26088-X
- OCLC: 16496298
- Preceded by: Coma
- Followed by: Brain

Sphinx is a 1979 novel by Robin Cook. It follows a young American Egyptologist named Erica Baron, on a working vacation in Egypt, who stumbles into a dangerous vortex of intrigue after seeing an ancient Egyptian statue of Seti I in a Cairo market. Cook's third novel, it is one of the few not centered on medicine.

In 1981, the novel was adapted into the film Sphinx starring Lesley-Anne Down as Erica and Frank Langella as Ahmed Khazzan.
