= Coma (novel) =

1977 novel by Robin Cook

- First edition cover
- Author: Robin Cook
- Language: English
- Genre: Thriller
- Publisher: Little, Brown & Co.
- Publication date: 1977
- Publication place: United States
- Media type: Print (hardcover)
- Pages: 306
- ISBN: 0-316-15510-1
- OCLC: 2829561
- Dewey Decimal: 813/.5/4
- LC Class: PZ4.C76992 Co PS3553.O5545
- Followed by: Sphinx

Coma is Robin Cook's first commercially successful novel, published by Signet Book in 1977. Coma was preceded in 1973 by Cook's lesser-known novel Year of the Intern.

== Plot ==
Susan Wheeler is a third-year medical student at Boston Memorial Hospital. She and four other students take rounds in surgery rooms and ICUs, recording post-treatment notations on the patients' health. Dr. Mark Bellows, a surgery resident in the hospital, is the instructor and this group's supervisor.

The book is a journey into the inner workings of a hospital. As these students complete their three-month surgical rotation, the dilemmas and problems faced by a woman in a male-dominated profession are also highlighted.

Susan notices that two patients, Nancy Greenly and Sean Berman, mysteriously went into comas immediately after their surgeries. These were attributed to anesthesia complications. Nancy Greenly became comatose due to her brain receiving insufficient oxygen during surgery. Similarly, Sean Berman, a healthy young man in his 30s, underwent a knee operation. Despite the operation's success, Sean failed to regain consciousness. Medically, the odds for such occurrences are one in 100,000; however, such odds seemed resolutely higher at the Boston Memorial Hospital.

Baffled by these two patients, Susan investigates their cases and other recent coma victims. She discovers that the oxygen line to Operating Room 8 has been tampered with to induce carbon monoxide poisoning in patients during surgery, ultimately causing brain death. At the same time, Susan develops a brief, but intimate, relationship with Bellows and discusses her findings with him. After unraveling further details, and evading pursuit by a man hired to kill her, Susan is led to the Jefferson Institute.

The institute is hailed as an intensive care facility designed to reduce high medical costs. Patients declared brain dead or "vegetables" are referred to the institute. Here, Susan finds that patients are suspended from the ceiling by wires in rooms walled by glass, and moved from room to room with little human involvement. The "samples" are kept alive and healthy until a call for an organ comes in. The organ of choice is removed surgically (without family consent) and then sold on the black market.

Howard Stark, chief of the Department of Surgery at Boston Memorial, is revealed as the main antagonist. Stark confronts Susan over her findings, then drugs her, intending to put her in an irreversible coma under the pretext of an appendectomy. However, Bellows disables the "oxygen" line during the operation, thereby preventing a full dose of carbon monoxide poisoning. Stark is arrested, but Susan's fate is left in doubt.

== Background ==
After Cook's first book failed to sell well, he studied the common ingredients of bestsellers and felt that for an unknown writer, mystery thrillers had the best chance of success. He was particularly influenced by Jaws, Seven Days in May and the novels of Eric Ambler. His original publisher rejected the idea but Little Brown agreed to give Cook a $10,000 advance.

== Critical response ==
Coma's literary awards and acclaims include a long tenure on the New York Times Best Seller list, reaching its high position of #6 in the fiction category. The novel was included in the Fiction category of "The New York Times Outstanding Book of the Year" listing (the forerunner to The New York Times' current "100 Notable Books of [Year]" listing) from which the "Best Book of the Year" is selected. The New York Times Book Review also called Coma 1977's "number one thriller of the year."

== Adaptations ==
The story was made into the highly successful 1978 film Coma, directed by Michael Crichton.

The story was adapted again into a two-part television miniseries that aired in September 2012 on the A&E television network.

== Editions ==
- ISBN 0-451-21142-1 (2003)
- ISBN 0-451-20739-4 (2002)
- ISBN 0-606-01135-8 (1977)
- ISBN 0-330-25410-3 (paperback) (1978)

Preceded by Year of the Intern	Robin Cook novels 1977	Succeeded by Sphinx
