= Seizure (Cook novel) =

Novel by Robin Cook

- First edition
- Author: Robin Cook
- Cover artist: Digital Vision
- Language: English
- Genre: Novel
- Publisher: G. P. Putnam's Sons
- Publication date: 2003
- Publication place: United States
- Media type: Print (Hardback & Paperback)
- Pages: 550 pp
- ISBN: 0-330-48306-4
- OCLC: 56756677
- Preceded by: Shock
- Followed by: Marker

Seizure is a 2003 novel by American author Robin Cook which explores the concerns raised by advances in therapeutic cloning. It debuted at Number 6 on The New York Times Best Seller list on August 3, 2003. It remained on the best seller list for three weeks. In November 2004 it appeared on the paperback best seller list.

== Plot ==
Senator Ashley Butler is a quintessential Southern demagogue whose support of traditional American values includes a knee-jerk reaction against virtually all biotechnologies. When he's called to chair a subcommittee introducing legislation to ban new cloning technology, the senator views his political future in bold relief; and Dr. Daniel Lowell, inventor of the technique that will take stem cell research to the next level, sees a roadblock positioned before his biotech startup.

The two seemingly opposite personalities clash during the senate hearings, but the men have a common desire. Butler's hunger for political power far outstrips his concern for the unborn; and Lowell's pursuit of gargantuan personal wealth and celebrity overrides any considerations for patients' well-being. Further complicating the proceedings is the confidential news that Senator Butler has developed Parkinson's disease, leading the senator and the researcher into a Faustian pact. In a perilous attempt to prematurely harness Lowell's new technology, the therapy leaves the senator with the horrifying effects of temporal lobe epilepsy—seizures of the most bizarre order.

== Characters ==
- Dr. Daniel Lowell: Scientist inventor of the HTSR and main character
- Dr. Stephanie D'Agostino: Scientist and Daniel's partner
- Senator Ashley Butler: Quintessential Southern demagogue politician that is afraid of the impact that his disease (Parkinson) may do with his career.
- Carol Menning: Butler's assistant that follows him during his travel.
