= Pandemic (Cook novel) =

Novel by Robin Cook

- Author: Robin Cook
- Language: English
- Genre: Novel
- Publication date: 2018
- Publication place: United States
- Media type: Print (hardback & paperback)
- ISBN: 978-0-525-53534-8
- Preceded by: Charlatans (2017)
- Followed by: Genesis (2019)

Pandemic is a 2018 medical thriller novel by Robin Cook. The book centers around the molecule called CRISPR/Cas9, which can be custom-tailored to find and alter genes in living organisms.

== Plot ==
A seemingly healthy woman with a transplanted heart has acute respiratory distress and dies on the New York subway. Jack Stapleton, a medical examiner and a character frequently appearing in Cook's novels, does the autopsy and suspects that the death could be due to a flu-like virus. While investigating the mysterious heart transplant of the dead woman, he discovers a larger conspiracy. He meets Wei Zao, a Chinese billionaire businessman who holds a double Ph.D. in molecular biology and genetics. Further cases of flu-like virus are reported in many other parts of the world and Jack determines to stop the pandemic from spreading.
