= Virus (1995 film) =

- DVD cover
- Genre: Science Fiction; Thriller
- Based on: Outbreak by Robin Cook
- Screenplay by: Roger Young
- Directed by: Armand Mastroianni
- Starring: Nicollette Sheridan; William Devane; Barry Corbin
- Music by: Garry Schyman
- Country of origin: United States
- Original language: English

Production
- Executive producers: Frank von Zerneck; Robert M. Sertner
- Producer: Randy Sutter
- Cinematography: Gideon Porath
- Editor: Tod Feuerman
- Running time: 93 minutes
- Production company: Von Zerneck Sertner Films

Original release
- Network: NBC
- Release: May 8, 1995

Virus is a 1995 television film starring Nicollette Sheridan, William Devane, Stephen Caffrey, Dakin Matthews, Kurt Fuller, Barry Corbin and William Atherton. It was directed by Armand Mastroianni and written by Robin Cook and Roger Young, based on Cook's 1987 novel Outbreak. The film was also released on DVD under the title Formula for Death.

== Plot ==
Virus is based on the medical fiction novel Outbreak by Robin Cook.

== Cast ==
- Nicollette Sheridan as Marissa Blumenthal
- William Devane as Dr. Harbuck
- Stephen Caffrey as Tad
- Dakin Matthews as Dr. Dubcheck
- Kurt Fuller as Dr. Williams
- Barry Corbin as Dr. Clayman
- William Atherton as Dr. Reginald Holloway
- Joe Minjanes as Dr. Newman

== Reception ==
Todd Everett of Variety wrote, "In reducing the hazard to the level of personal melodrama, both the feature and the telepic trivialize the real-life menace, which is plenty scary on its own." John J. O'Connor of The New York Times called the story inane and harebrained. Chris Willman of the Los Angeles Times wrote that Mastroianni "tries to pump imperiled-woman suspense into the ludicrous scheming, with minimal antidotal effect. Prepare for an outbreak of laughter."
