= Sphinx (film) =

1981 film by Franklin J. Schaffner

- Theatrical release poster
- Directed by: Franklin J. Schaffner
- Screenplay by: John Byrum
- Based on: Sphinx; 1979 novel by Robin Cook
- Produced by: Stanley O'Toole
- Starring: Lesley-Anne Down; Frank Langella
- Cinematography: Ernest Day
- Edited by: Robert Swink; Michael F. Anderson
- Music by: Michael J. Lewis
- Production company: Orion Pictures
- Distributed by: Warner Bros.
- Release date: February 11, 1981
- Running time: 118 minutes
- Country: United States
- Language: English
- Budget: $10.2 million
- Box office: $11.4 million

Sphinx is a 1981 American adventure film directed by Franklin J. Schaffner and starring Lesley-Anne Down and Frank Langella. The screenplay by John Byrum is based on the 1979 novel of the same name by Robin Cook.

== Plot ==
Dedicated Egyptologist Erica Baron is researching a paper about the chief architect to Pharaoh Seti. Soon after her arrival in Cairo, she witnesses the brutal murder of unscrupulous art dealer Abdu-Hamdi, meets Yvon Mageot, a French journalist, and is befriended by Akmed Khazzan, who heads the antiquities division of the United Nations. When she journeys to the Valley of the Kings in Luxor to search a tomb reportedly filled with treasures, she finds herself the target of black marketeers determined to keep the riches for themselves.

== Cast ==
- Lesley-Anne Down as Erica Baron
- Frank Langella as Akmed Khazzan
- Maurice Ronet as Yvon Mageot
- John Gielgud as Abdu-Hamdi
- Vic Tablian as Khalifa
- Martin Benson as Mohammed
- John Rhys-Davies as Stephanos Markoulis
- Nadim Sawalha as Gamal
- Tutte Lemkow as Tewfik
- Saeed Jaffrey as Selim
- Eileen Way as Aida
- William Hootkins as Don
- James Cossins as Lord Carnarvon
- Victoria Tennant as Lady Carnarvon
- Behrouz Vossoughi as Menephta, the Royal Architect

== Production ==
Film rights were purchased by Orion Pictures for $1 million.

Schaffner said in 1981, "I've never done this kind of film before, this mixture of mystery and adventure and romance. Two years ago, when I considered taking on the project, it seemed to me that audiences would look for this kind of escapist entertainment when it was released. I sincerely hope I'm right."

Interiors were filmed in Budapest. Egypt locations include the Cairo bazaars, Giza, the Winter Palace Hotel in Luxor, and Thebes. The tomb set cost $1 million.

Lesley-Anne Down got married during the filming.

== Critical reception ==
Vincent Canby of The New York Times said the film "never stops talking and never does it make a bit of sense. It's unhinged. If it were a person, and you were trying to be nice, you might say it wasn't itself." He continued, "Mr. Schaffner and Mr. Byrum have effectively demolished what could have possibly been a decently absurd archeological-adventure film. The locations ... are so badly and tackily used that the movie could have been shot more economically in Queens ... The performers are terrible, none more so than Mr. Langella, who is supposed to be mysterious and romantic but behaves with all of the charm of a room clerk at the Nile Hilton." In conclusion, he called the film "total, absolute, utter confusion".

Variety described the film as a contemporary version of The Perils of Pauline and called it "an embarrassment", adding "Franklin J. Schaffner's steady and sober style is helpless in the face of the mounting implausibilities."

Time Out New York thought the film made "striking use of locations" but criticized the "lousy script, uneasy heroine, and weak material". It called it a "clear case of a lame project that only a best selling (ie. heavily pre-sold) novel could have financed" and warned audiences to "avoid" it.
