= Acceptable Risk (novel) =

Novel by Robin Cook

- First edition (US)
- Author: Robin Cook
- Cover artist: One Plus One Studio; Don Braughtigam
- Language: English
- Genre: Novel
- Publisher: Putnam (US); Macmillan (UK)
- Publication date: 1995
- Publication place: United States
- Media type: Print (hardback & paperback)
- Pages: 404
- ISBN: 0-333-64223-6
- OCLC: 33206734
- Preceded by: Fatal Cure
- Followed by: Contagion

Acceptable Risk is a 1995 novel by American author Robin Cook.

A scientist, Edward Armstrong, discovers a mold in a spooky old house he lives in with his girlfriend. In order to test his theory that the discovery could help people feel calm in extreme situations, the scientist injects himself and his fellow scientists with the mold. The man undergoes some strange changes, which may or may not have something to do with the house's first owner, a woman who was hanged under suspicion of being a witch. Are the side effects worth the benefits? What if the side effect was something that had never been seen before? This book explores the practice of designer drugs.

The novel was made into a TV film in 2001, directed by William A. Graham, and starring Chad Lowe and Kelly Rutherford.

== Synopsis ==
The book opens with the Salem Witch Trials of 1692 where Elizabeth Stewart is prosecuted on suspicions of being a witch. This occurs on the insistence of witnesses who see children acting strangely after eating rye bread. Despite the pleas of her husband who happens to be a wealthy shipbuilder, she is executed at the insistence of Reverend Increase Mather, who convinces her husband with mysterious evidence.

Three hundred years later, the Stewart family fortune is inherited by Kimberly Stewart, a nurse. Kim is introduced to the brilliant scientist Edward Armstrong by their mutual friend Stanton Lewis. The two immediately fall in love. A casual visit to her old family house in Salem proves to be a turning point in the story. In the basement of the old house, Edward finds a new strain of Claviceps purpurea which induces a great sense of calmness, sexual drive, confidence, etc. Edward immediately assembles a team and begins working on developing the new drug with help from Stanton. To save time, Edward and his team start taking the drug themselves. During this time, Kim is working on finding out about the evidence that was used to convict her ancestor. Finding out that the evidence is in the possession of Harvard University, she makes inquiries in that direction.

Soon, strange things begin happening in Salem. The town begins experiencing acts of vandalism, and even murder. Edward's Jack Russell dog notably falls victim to the mysterious killer. Meanwhile, Kim finally locates the evidence mentioned in the letter. It turns out to be the fetus of a deformed baby which was given birth by Elizabeth. The fetus is taken as evidence by the clergy of her covenant with the devil. Kim rushes home to inform Edward that the drug they are taking has teratogenic effects. However, at home, she is attacked by Edward and his team who are in a kind of trance. In the ensuing pursuit, the house is set ablaze killing all but two of the researchers. In the epilogue, Kim visits Edward who is a resident at a medical facility, where he still has the strain in him and therefore transforms into a man with raging episodes.
