= Year of the Intern =

Novel by Robin Cook

- First edition
- Author: Robin Cook
- Language: English
- Published: 1972 (Harcourt Brace)
- Publication place: United States
- Media type: Print (hardback)
- Pages: 246
- ISBN: 0-15-199740-3
- OCLC: 417038
- Dewey Decimal: 813/.5/4
- LC Class: PZ4.C76992 Ye PS3553.O5545

The Year of the Intern is a 1972 novel by Robin Cook. His first novel, and very different from his thrillers, it follows the journey of intern Dr. Peters through his year of placement.

== Plot introduction ==
The book gives an insider's perspective of the medical world. As Dr. Peters becomes a doctor, he is destroying himself as a person due to extensive work and concerns.

Cook began writing the book while serving on a submarine, basing it on his experiences as a medical resident. When it did not do particularly well, he began an extensive study of other books in the genre to see what made a bestseller. He decided to concentrate on medical suspense thrillers, mixing intricately plotted murder and intrigue with medical technology. He also brought controversial ethical and social issues affecting the medical profession to the attention of the general public.

=== Plot summary ===
Dr. Peters receives a phone call from a nurse, who sounds desperate, but Dr. Peters can do little. He has forgotten when he last slept, but he knows that in the coming hours he will make life or death decisions. As he begins his internship, he must deal with assisting the surgeons in the operating room, help nurses who happen to know more than him, cope with worried friends and family of the ill and injured, and pretend that he is a qualified doctor. The book takes a deeper look into the psychical and psychological effects on a medical intern.

Preceded by None	Robin Cook novels 1972	Succeeded by Coma
