= Fever (Cook novel) =

1982 novel by Robin Cook

- First edition (US)
- Author: Robin Cook
- Cover artist: Peter Goodfellow
- Language: English
- Genre: Thriller
- Publisher: Putnam (US); Macmillan (UK)
- Publication date: 1982
- Publication place: United States
- Media type: Print (hardback & paperback)
- Pages: 303
- ISBN: 0-451-15428-2
- OCLC: 7923112
- Preceded by: Brain
- Followed by: Godplayer

Fever is a 1982 novel by Robin Cook and is in the category of medical thriller. It was plagiarised by Yandamuri Veerendranath into Prardhana.

== Plot ==
Set mainly in the Boston area and in rural New Hampshire, its main characters are a 12-year-old girl, Michelle Martel, with leukemia and her father, Charles Martel, a former allergist turned cancer researcher, as well as her stepmother, Cathryn, and her two older brothers, Chuck and Jean-Paul.

After falling ill one winter morning, Michelle is hospitalized, diagnosed with acute myeloblastic leukemia, and given experimentally high doses of chemotherapy, to which her father objects, since it has no effect on her leukemia and weakens her with side effects. Cathryn, a former receptionist at the fictional Weinberger Institute in Cambridge, Massachusetts, where Charles has worked since turning to cancer research, has little medical knowledge and only wants what is best for her stepchildren, and feels torn between her husband and Michelle's well-meaning but conventional doctors.

Charles then traces Michelle's leukemia and a neighbor boy's fatal aplastic anemia to benzene dumped into the river flowing past their house by a local rubber and plastic recycling plant owned by the same corporation that owns the Weinberger Institute and the pharmaceutical company that makes a cancer drug he is being forced to study, and discovers that he is surrounded by corruption, as family, colleagues and the authorities turn against him. He ends up valiantly trying an experimental treatment based on his own research on Michelle, desperately trying to save her life, while barricaded in his own home, sought by the police, and fighting off attacks by thugs hired by the recycling plant and its parent company which are condoned by the local authorities.

== Reception ==
According to a review in Kirkus Reviews, "the comic-strip style that worked for Cook's make-believe shockers [...] is hopeless in this more grimly realistic story; and every idea here [...] has been dramatized better elsewhere."
