= Harmful Intent =

1990 novel by Robin Cook

- First edition (US)
- Author: Robin Cook
- Cover artist: One Plus One Studio; Don Braughtigam
- Language: English
- Genre: Thriller, Novel
- Publisher: Putnam (US); Macmillan (UK)
- Publication date: 1990
- Publication place: United States
- Media type: Print (paperback & hardback)
- Pages: 400
- ISBN: 0-330-31619-2
- OCLC: 24743359
- Preceded by: Mutation
- Followed by: Vital Signs

Harmful Intent (1990) is a novel by Robin Cook. Like most of Cook's other works, it is a medical thriller.

== Characters ==
Dr. Jeffrey Rhodes is a painstakingly thorough anesthesiologist whose patient dies after he administers a routine drug. Brought to trial and found guilty of negligence and murder, he faces a probable jail sentence. Rather than go to prison, he jumps bail and is nearly caught at the airport by a bounty hunter. Dr. Rhodes sets off to track down what caused the inexplicable reaction in his patient. While trying to justify his professional competence, he stumbles across a lead—notes left by a Dr. Christopher Everson, who committed suicide soon after being ruined by a case similar to his own. Rhodes enlists the aid of nurse Kelly Everson, Everson's widow, to gather the evidence he needs to clear himself. Dr. Rhodes combines sharp wits with good luck as he assumes a false identity to uncover details of the scheme that has caused his downfall. He infiltrates his old place of employment, visits the morgue and coroner, and even manages to have a corpse exhumed illegally—all while the police are searching for him. The character of nurse Everson is not well developed but provides Rhodes with someone to turn to as he tries to avoid the police. The romance that develops between them is all too predictable.

Devlin O'Shea, the bounty hunter, complicates Rhodes's life by pursuing him after he jumps bail. Turning up at unexpected times and places, he is responsible for much of the novel's suspense. An ex-cop dismissed from the force because of an error in judgment, he eventually comes to identify with Rhodes's plight. Trent Harding is an unstable nurse, whose hatred of authority, and need to bolster his self-image, make him susceptible to an unscrupulous law firm's offer of employment.
