= Martin Erlichman =

American film producer (1929–2026)

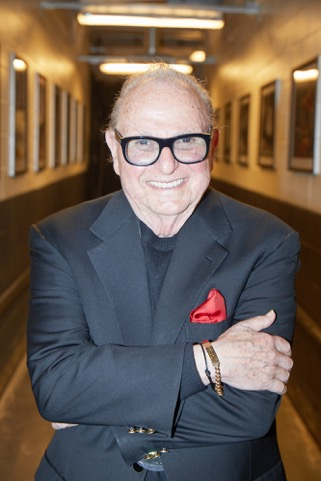
- Erlichman in 2021
- Born: September 13, 1929; New York City, U.S.
- Died: October 31, 2026 (aged 97); Los Angeles, California, U.S.
- Education: Drake University
- Occupations: Talent manager, film and television producer
- Known for: Discovering Barbra Streisand and managing her career
- Notable work: Coma; Breathless

Martin Lee Erlichman (September 13, 1929 – October 31, 2026) was an American talent manager in the entertainment industry who is best known for discovering Barbra Streisand and managing her career for over 60 years. Erlichman produced award-winning and record-setting motion pictures, concerts, record albums, as well as network and cable television programs.

Erlichman was also the manager of The Clancy Brothers and Tommy Makem in the early 1960s and was responsible for the adoption of the Aran Sweaters as the visual identity of the bands.

== Career as Barbra Streisand's manager ==
As manager for Streisand, he negotiated all of her numerous recording, theater, motion picture, television, merchandise/licensing and live concert contracts. The Barbra Streisand concerts he produced include her 2006–2007 world tour as well as the millennium concert of 2000. In each of these concert venues Streisand set and still holds the all time box office record for live performance. He has been the executive producer of all Streisand's television specials and the producer on one of her films, For Pete’s Sake.

== Other media credits ==
In addition to Streisand and the Clancy Brothers, Erlichman represented Bob Crewe, Chevy Chase and George Foreman and Gary Puckett and the Union Gap.

His other producer film credits included Coma (1978), starring Michael Douglas, Breathless (1983), starring Richard Gere, and a number of the films in the Ernest franchise. He represented the Where's Waldo? franchise and negotiated deals for this character in books, television and films.

In addition to Emmy, Cable and Grammy Award nominations, Erlichman won both an Emmy and a Peabody Award as executive producer for Barbra Streisand: The Concert.

Erlichman later produced a $30 million production of an original stage musical titled Buzz!! with a book by Larry Gelbart; music by Alan Menken; lyrics by David Zippel; and directed by Rob Roth. He was also actively involved as producer of a Broadway stage version of the cartoon Tom and Jerry.

== Personal life and death ==
Martin Lee Erlichman was born in Brooklyn, New York, on September 13, 1929. He graduated from Drake University. He died in Los Angeles on October 31, 2026, at the age of 97.
