= Sarah Smith (writer) =

American speculative fiction novelist

Sarah Winthrop Rishworth Smith
- Born: December 9, 1947 (age 78); Boston, Massachusetts, U.S.
- Education: Harvard University (BA, PhD)
- Occupation: Novelist
- Writing career
- Genres: Mystery, science fiction, hypertext fiction
- Notable awards: Agatha Awards
- Literary movement: Historical whodunnit, Interstitial arts
- Website: www.sarahsmith.com

Sarah Smith (born December 9, 1947) is an American author living in Brookline, Massachusetts.

== Life ==
She holds a B.A. and a Ph.D. in English literature, both from Harvard. She was an assistant professor of English for several years before going to work in the computer industry. She has worked for Lisp Machines Inc., Bachman Inc., ITP Systems, Inc., and Effective Educational Tech which was acquired by Pearson Education in 2006.

She is the author of a four-novel historical mystery series set in turn of the century Boston and Paris about amnesiac Alexander von Reisden. She has also authored King of Space, a work of speculative fiction published as a hypertext novel by Eastgate Systems, Inc. in 1991, that places her among the pioneers of electronic literature. She has been a frequent speaker at Readercon in Boston.

== Awards ==
- Fulbright fellow 1968-69
- Mellon fellow, 1977
- Woman of Year, The College Club of Boston, 1997
- Agatha Award, The Other Side of Dark, 2010
- Massachusetts Book Award, The Other Side of Dark, 2011

== Works ==
- The Vanished Child (Reprint (1993) ed.). Ballantine Books. 1992. ISBN 978-0-345-38164-4.
- The Knowledge of Water. Ballantine Books. 1996. ISBN 978-0-345-39135-3.
- A Citizen of the Country (Reprint (2002) ed.). Ballantine Books. 2000. ISBN 978-0-345-43303-9.
- Chasing Shakespeares Atria Books, 2003, ISBN 978-0-7434-6482-6
- The Other Side of Dark Atheneum, 2010, ISBN 978-1-4424-0280-5
- Crimes and Survivors Max Light Books, 2020, ISBN 1951636112

=== Hypertext novel ===
- Smith, Sarah with Eastgate Systems (1991). The King of Space. This work was revived and discussed in Rebooting Electronic Literature.

=== Anthologies ===
- The Boys Go Fishing (Aug 2010) in Death's Excellent Vacation
