= Mortal Fear (Cook novel) =

Novel by Robin Cook

- First edition (US)
- Author: Robin Cook
- Cover artist: Chris Moore
- Language: English
- Genre: Thriller
- Publisher: Putnam (US); Macmillan (UK)
- Publication date: 1989
- Publication place: United States
- Media type: Print (hardback & paperback)
- Pages: 364 pp
- ISBN: 0-330-30760-6
- OCLC: 220507798
- Preceded by: Outbreak
- Followed by: Mutation

The novel Mortal Fear by Robin Cook in 1989 deals with the issues of euthanasia hospital and increasing cost of keeping elderly people alive. The piece's villain espouses views that the elderly and incapacitated deserve to die in order to lighten the burden on the overtaxed medical system—quite contrary to the view of "do no harm" held by both the novel's main character and author.

== Plot summary ==
Dr. Jason Howard is a general practitioner at Good Health Plan (a fictitious Boston hospital); he was formerly a resident at Massachusetts General. When a patient of his is admitted complaining of heart problems and later dies, Jason finds that, though having received a clean bill of health less than a month before, that the heart attack came totally out of left field and the patient looks decidedly older than he ought to at 56. Soon two more cases come to his attention, both healthy a month before, now dead, both looking older than their years.

Alvin Hayes, a former classmate of Jason's at Harvard, asks to speak to him about his recent strange caseload. Hayes is a shifty, twitchy man whose personal life is a subject of some question who seems unduly paranoid, and Jason wonders if the resident mad scientist has gotten into something illicit. At dinner Hayes, while talking about his genetic research on aging, suddenly begins expelling blood violently. He dies a gory death right there in the restaurant. Jason begins investigating the connection between the man's sudden demise, his nervous demeanor, and the patients in his hospital who have all been admitted with what seems to be a mutant strain of progeria that killed them in mere days.
