= Coma (1978 film) =

1978 film by Michael Crichton

- Directed by: Michael Crichton
- Screenplay by: Michael Crichton
- Based on: Coma; 1977 novel by Robin Cook
- Produced by: Martin Erlichman
- Starring: Geneviève Bujold; Michael Douglas; Elizabeth Ashley; Rip Torn; Richard Widmark
- Cinematography: Victor J. Kemper
- Edited by: David Bretherton
- Music by: Jerry Goldsmith
- Color process: Metrocolor
- Production company: Metro-Goldwyn-Mayer
- Distributed by: United Artists
- Release date: January 6, 1978
- Running time: 113 minutes
- Country: United States
- Language: English
- Budget: $4 million or $4.5 million

Coma is a 1978 American mystery thriller film based on the 1977 novel by Robin Cook. The film rights were acquired by director Michael Crichton, who also wrote the screenplay, and the movie was produced by Martin Erlichmann for Metro-Goldwyn-Mayer. The cast includes Geneviève Bujold, Michael Douglas, Elizabeth Ashley, Richard Widmark, and Rip Torn. Among the actors in smaller roles are Tom Selleck, Lois Chiles, and Ed Harris.

The story was adapted again into a two-part television miniseries broadcast in September 2012 on A&E television network.

== Plot ==
Dr. Susan Wheeler, a surgical resident at Boston Memorial Hospital, is devastated when her friend, Nancy Greenly, a young healthy woman, is left brain dead after undergoing a routine procedure there. Her suspicions are aroused when, soon after, another young and otherwise healthy patient also falls comatose during knee surgery.

Susan investigates and discovers that over the previous year, an unusual number of other fit, young patients have suffered the same fate. Those patients also had a tissue-type sample taken before being transferred to the Jefferson Institute, a remote care facility. Reviewing records of several recent cases of comatose patients, she observes that all received surgery in Operating Room (OR) #8. Susan's physician boyfriend, Mark Bellows, believes it is merely a coincidence.

Susan offends the Chief of Anesthesiology by asking to review all relevant patient charts. Increasingly isolated and under mounting pressure from superiors and colleagues, Susan also begins doubting Mark's trustworthiness. She visits the hospital morgue where a postmortem is being performed on Nancy, who has since died. Susan asks the pathologists about ways someone could deliberately be put into a coma without detection. One pathologist suggests carbon monoxide poisoning.

Dr. Harris, the chief of surgery, has twice reproached Susan about her recent behavior and questions about Dr. George, whose name she overhears discussed by staff during her inquiries. Warning that she could be dismissed, Dr. Harris insists she speak with a psychiatrist as a condition of continued employment. He is, however, sympathetic and has her take the weekend off to cope with her grief and stress over Nancy's death. Susan and Mark spend a relaxing weekend at the seaside. While driving back to Boston, she sees a highway sign for the Jefferson Institute and wants to go there. An uninterested Mark waits in the car while Susan enters the austere building. Nurse Emerson greets Susan, explaining that the facility is closed to visitors, but informs her of a physicians' tour on Tuesday.

Soon after, Kelly, a hospital maintenance worker who tipped off Susan that her suspicions are correct, is fatally electrocuted by an unknown man. Based on his assertions, Susan searches in the hospital basement and finds a tank with a line leading from it, through the ventilation system, to OR #8, controlled by a radio signal. Thus, patients are rendered brain-dead via carbon monoxide pumped to the anesthesia equipment. The man who killed Kelly stalks Susan, and late one night, he attempts to attack her at the hospital. After a brief struggle, Susan barely escapes and traps him in the anatomy lab's cadaver cooler.

At the Jefferson Institute, Susan joins the physician's tour for what is apparently an advanced, low-cost care facility for comatose patients. Slipping furtively from the tour to secretly investigate the restricted areas, she discovers that the institute is a cover for an international human organ black market where patients' organs are being sold to the highest bidder and that "Dr. George" is associated with it. Jefferson security spots her on surveillance cameras, but she escapes atop an ambulance as it leaves the compound to transport harvested organs to the airport.

Believing Dr. George is the operation's mastermind, Susan rushes to Dr. Harris to share what she has discovered. He offers her a drink, and she quickly becomes incapacitated, experiencing severe abdominal pain mimicking appendicitis. Susan realizes she has been drugged and that "Dr. George" is actually Dr. George Harris. Barely conscious, she is rushed to surgery where he will perform an appendectomy. As she is prepped for surgery, the staff inform Dr. Harris that OR #7 is ready, but his vehement insistence on using OR #8 arouses Mark's suspicions, and he finds the gas line going from the basement and disconnects it. To Dr. Harris' shock, Susan awakens after surgery, and two police officers called by Mark are waiting outside to arrest him.

== Cast ==
- Geneviève Bujold as Dr. Susan Wheeler, surgery resident at Boston Memorial Hospital.
- Michael Douglas as Dr. Mark Bellows, surgery resident at Boston Memorial Hospital and Susan Wheeler's romantic partner.
- Elizabeth Ashley as Mrs. Emerson, a nurse at the Jefferson Institute.
- Rip Torn as Dr. George, chief of anesthesiology at Boston Memorial Hospital.
- Richard Widmark as Dr. George Harris, chief of surgery at Boston Memorial Hospital.
- Lois Chiles as Nancy Greenly
- Hari Rhodes as Dr. Morelind, hospital psychiatrist at Boston Memorial Hospital. (as Harry Rhodes)
- Richard Doyle as Jim, a pathologist at Boston Memorial Hospital.
- Lance LeGault as Vince, a truck driver.
- Betty McGuire as Nurse
- Tom Selleck as Sean Murphy, surgery patient.
- Charles Siebert as Dr. Goodman
- William Wintersole as Lab Technician
- Joanna Kerns as Diane
- Benny Rubin as Mr. Schwartz
- Ed Harris as Pathology Resident
- Alan Haufrect as Dr. Marcus
- Philip Baker Hall as Doctor (uncredited)

== Production ==
Michael Crichton was told about Robin Cook's novel by agent Bob Bookman. Crichton had met Cook when the former was doing post-doctoral work in biology at La Jolla's Salk Institute and Cook was a Navy physician stationed at San Diego. Crichton felt the novel "was a thriller with substance; it had something to say. Another appeal was it was a story about women, which is something films need."

In December 1976, prior to the novel being published, it was announced Crichton would write and direct the film adaptation. The movie was financed by MGM, which had made Westworld (1973) with Crichton. Crichton said he found it easier to adapt someone else's work than to adapt his own novels.

Crichton described the film as like a "Western...if the doctors are the bad guys, they are also the good guys." He added, "I was concerned in writing the script to avoid any inference of science fiction. The only thing that comes close is the hanging of the bodies."

Crichton says that even though the lead in the book was a female the studio talked about getting Paul Newman to play it, but he fought it. "If a man had done the movie, it would be a much more conventional thing." Genevieve Bujold played the part. “The only other actress who could have pulled it off is Jane Fonda," said Crichton.

Tom Selleck was cast in the film for his appearances in Salem cigarette advertisements.

Crichton, a graduate of Harvard Medical School, sought to avoid depicting graphic details of medical procedures in order to avoid frightening the audience away from seeking medical care.

Filming started on June 20, 1977 in Massachusetts. Shooting took place at Boston City Hospital and the University of Southern California's dissection room. Filming also took place at the MBTA subway, Rockport, Marblehead, Los Angeles City Hall, Century City, and Culver City Studios.

The mysterious, Brutalist-style building that served as the film's "Jefferson Institute" was at the time of filming a regional headquarters of Xerox Corporation. It is located on 191 Spring Street in Lexington, Massachusetts and as of 2021 is the offices of Mimecast.

Michael Douglas called the film "the first time I've been offered a project with a good story laid out well, a good cast, and a good director." The film cost $4.1 million but this was off-set by a pre-sale to TV worth $3 million.

== Reception ==
Stanley Kauffmann of The New Republic wrote "Coma is a thriller, rotten; but it's really worse than that. It's a disgrace to the several physicians involved in it".

The New York Times review had its concerns: "It’s the kind of story that, after you’ve seen ‘Coma,’ you might suspect a couple of waggish surgeons of having cooked it up in the operating room while removing a brain tumor. One can only hope the surgeons would be more efficient in cleaning up after the brain tumor than they’ve been in tidying up the plausibility questions that remain after the movie. Plausibility is not always important, but in a film as bereft of distinctive style and wit as ‘Coma,’ it helps to believe in something. It can even help if one is offended. The aftereffect of ‘Coma’ is a catlike yawn, benign and bored....’Coma’ is the kind of movie that turns real-life actors into robot-like functions of the story....Bujold...Douglas...Widmark, as well as...Torn...Ashley and...Chiles, are as mechanical as dolls whose expressions are controlled by a computer’s console."

Despite Crichton's intentions against scaring audiences from hospitals, many physicians and hospital administrators claimed this occurred. Variety mentioned the film as a possible cause of the drop in organ donor numbers. It also claimed that a hospital in Tampa had to remove the number "8" from the door to an operating room because of patient complaints.

The film currently sits at an 81% rating on Rotten Tomatoes, based on an aggregate of 26 reviews. Metacritic, which uses a weighted average, assigned the film a score of 60 out of 100, based on 8 critics, indicating "mixed or average" reviews.
