= Sean Weathers =

American actor

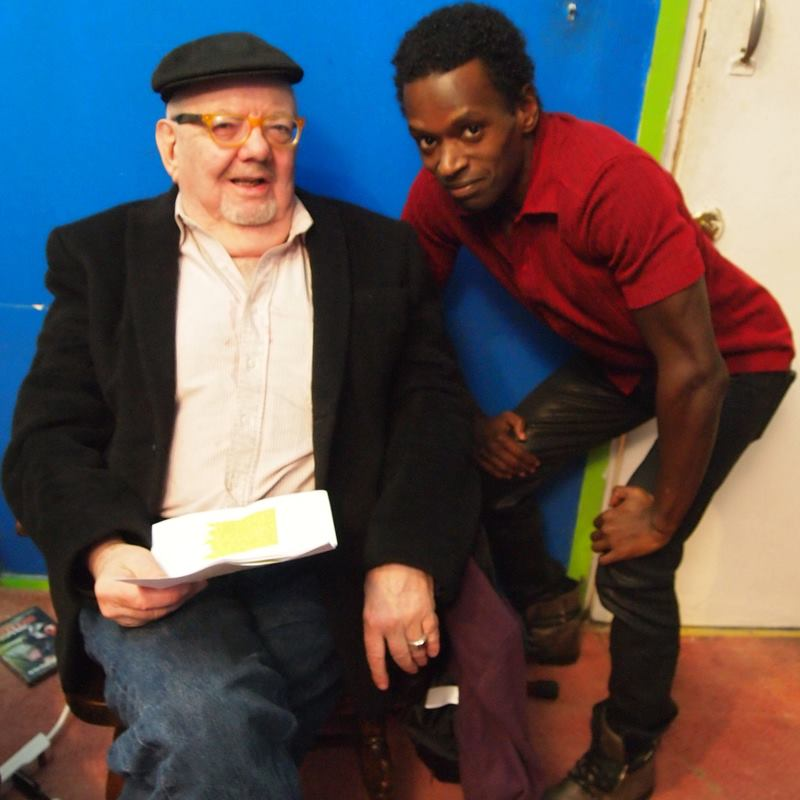
- Production still from The Fappening featuring Séan on the right and Joel M. Reed on the left.
- Born: Sean Weathers; January 14, 1980 (age 46); Jonestown, Guyana
- Occupations: Film director, producer, screenwriter and film editor
- Years active: 1996–present

Sean Weathers (born January 14, 1980, in Jonestown, Guyana) is an American, New York City based, film director, producer, screenwriter, editor, casting director and actor. Weathers specializes in making low-budget films primarily in the erotic and horror genres using skeleton crews and guerrilla filmmaking tactics.

== Filmography ==
Year	Film	Producer	Director	Screenwriter	Editor	Actor	Casting Director	Cinematographer	Notes							
Year	Film	Producer	Director	Screenwriter	Editor	Actor	Casting Director	Cinematographer	Notes	1996	House of the Damned	Yes	Yes	Yes	Yes	Yes
1998	They All Must Die!	Yes	Yes	Yes	Yes		Yes		"							
2001	Lust for Vengeance	Yes	Yes	Yes	Yes		Yes									
2004	The Unfinished Works of Sean Weathers	Yes	Yes	Yes	Yes		Yes									
2006	Hookers in Revolt	Yes	Yes	Yes	Yes	Yes	Yes									
2013	The Trade Off	Yes	Yes	Yes	Yes	Yes	Yes									
2013	Maniac Too!	Yes	Yes	Yes	Yes		Yes									
2013	A Good Samaritan in New York City	Yes				Yes										
2013	Vault of Terror	Yes	Yes	Yes	Yes	Yes	Yes									
2014	Scumbag Hustler	Yes	Yes	Yes	Yes	Yes	Yes									
2015	The Fappening	Yes	Yes	Yes	Yes	Yes	Yes	Yes								
2015	Vault of Terror II: The Undead	Yes	Yes	Yes	Yes	Yes	Yes	Yes								
2015	Ace Jackson is a Dead Man	Yes	Yes	Yes	Yes	Yes	Yes									
2015	Mandingo Sex Addict	Yes	Yes	Yes	Yes	Yes	Yes									
2015	Bill Huckstabelle: Serial Rapist	Yes				Yes	Yes									
2016	The New York Butcher	Yes	Yes	Yes	Yes	Yes	Yes	Yes								
2018	The Devil's Camera	Yes	Yes	Yes	Yes	Yes	Yes	Yes								
2018	Virgin Genocide	Yes	Yes	Yes	Yes	Yes	Yes	Yes								
2018	The Nothing Man	Yes	Yes	Yes	Yes	Yes	Yes	Yes								
