= Vital Signs (novel) =

Novel by Robin Cook

- First edition (US)
- Author: Robin Cook
- Cover artist: One Plus One Studio; Don Braughtigam
- Language: English
- Genre: Thriller
- Publisher: Putnam (US); Macmillan (UK)
- Publication date: 1991
- Publication place: United States
- Media type: Print
- Pages: 396
- ISBN: 0-330-32147-1
- OCLC: 59984975
- Preceded by: Harmful Intent
- Followed by: Blindsight

Vital Signs is a novel by Robin Cook. Like most of Cook's other work, it is a medical thriller. It's about a successful epidemiologist and married woman Marissa Blumenthal. When she discovers that she cannot conceive, her obsession with getting pregnant leads her to investigate the fertility market.

== Plot summary ==
Dr. Blumenthal finds out that she cannot conceive as her fallopian tubes are blocked due to a case of TB, which she feels is extremely rare in current times. She tries to conceive through a modern technique called in vitro fertilization from a very well-known fertility clinic, but after four unsuccessful cycles, she and her husband start to have differing opinions about continuing their quest for a child. This starts to take a toll on their relationship, as Marissa is adamant about going on for the next cycle and her husband thinks it would be another $10,000 down the drain. Marissa joins a counseling group for such in vitro couples, and meets up with her medical school friend Wendy, who also shares the same medical condition as her. Soon the two women discover that the specific condition is found in numerous women being treated in the clinic where they are getting treated. A suicide (suggested to be a murder) of a fellow woman patient in the clinic also adds to their curiosity. They break into the clinic and try to read their medical records, which are kept in a highly confidential status in the clinic.

They find out that a pathologist, Dr. Tristan Williams, from a clinic with a similar name in Australia, has written a paper about a condition similar to theirs. On the spur of the moment, they decide to go to Australia to visit the author. When they inquire about him at the facility, they get negative responses and are made to believe that they have made a wasted trip. When Wendy is killed in an unexpected accident involving a shark, Marissa feels that her death is more than an unfortunate accident. After a few fruitless efforts to find Dr. Williams, Marissa meets him in his current assignment. From him, she learns about a practice where pairs of Chinese citizens who were smuggled into Australia work in the clinic regularly. Tristan tells Marissa that due to the paper he wrote, the FCA has taken retaliatory steps against him, like branding him with drugs and killing his wife two years ago. He has had to be constantly on the run, which made him send his only son to live with his in-laws to keep him safe. Marissa and Tristan team up to get to the bottom of the mystery.

Tristan suggests that there had to be a drug trafficking involved since the illegal Chinese workers were transported from the Republic of China and moved into Australia through Hong Kong. They decide to visit Hong Kong. In Hong Kong, as they try to get information on how they are able to transport people from China to Hong Kong, there are two more attempts to kill them. Both attempts fail. During one attempt, Marissa's husband, who comes to Hong Kong to take Marissa back home, is killed by mistake. Finally, they get to meet one such pair who is to be transported from China to Hong Kong in a boat for the FCA. Marissa discovers that one of the pair was a martial arts expert, whose sole duty was to protect the other. The other person was a rural doctor from China. Marissa and Tristan question the pair about the drug business, but all their answers are negative. Soon, Marissa, Tristan, and the Chinese doctor get stranded due to the border patrol force.

Marissa discovers that the rural doctors are trained to sterilize women as mitigation by the government to control the population. This sterilization is a simple remedy that can be done without making the patient unconscious. This comes as a shocking revelation and helps Marissa put together all the things she has gone through. She finds out that the clinic is sterilizing its women patients who are coming in for regular check-ups. They also fail their initial in vitro cycles by making the fertilization medium more acidic. After 5 or 6 cycles, they let the couple have children. After this discovery, the CDC and FBI got involved to close up these clinics and take legal action. In the end, Marissa marries Tristan and the couple plans to adopt a Chinese baby from Hong Kong.
