= Linda Barnes (writer) =

American mystery writer

- Born: December 6, 1949 (age 76)
- Education: Boston University
- Occupation: Writer
- Writing career
- Language: English
- Genre: Mystery fiction
- Notable work: Carlotta Carlyle series
- Website: www.lindabarnes.com

Linda Barnes (born December 6, 1949) is an American mystery writer.

== Biography ==
Linda Barnes was born and raised in Detroit, and graduated cum laude from the School of Fine and Applied Arts at Boston University. After college, Barnes became a drama teacher and director at Chelmsford and Lexington, Massachusetts schools. While teaching drama, Barnes wrote two plays, the award-winning "Wings" and "Prometheus", and went on to write highly successful mystery novels.

Linda Barnes lives near Boston with her husband and has one son.

== Book reviews ==
- The Perfect Ghost Carolyn Haley's book review in the New York Journal of Books noted “Don’t be surprised if Linda Barnes gets an award for The Perfect Ghost, . . .”
- Kirkus wrote "Barnes puts aside her Carlotta Carlyle series (Lie Down With the Devil, 2008, etc.) for an eerie, suspenseful stand-alone that focuses more on the characters and their dark pasts than on a clever mystery."
- Publishers Weekly wrote "Although the mystery is slow to build, Barnes delivers a captivating story of love, rivalry, and revenge."

=== Awards ===
==== Wins ====
- 1986 Anthony award for Best short story, "Lucky Penny"
- 1987 Edgar award for Best novel, A Trouble of Fools

==== Nominations ====
- 1986 Shamus award for Best private eye short story, "Lucky Penny"
- 1988 Anthony award for Best novel, A Trouble of Fools
- 1988 Edgar award for Best mystery novel, A Trouble of Fools
- 1988 Shamus award for Best private eye novel, A Trouble of Fools

== Publications ==
Barnes is best known for her series featuring Carlotta Carlyle, a 6'1" redheaded detective from Boston. Carlotta Carlyle is in the tradition of the hard-boiled female detectives created by Sue Grafton and Sara Paretsky.

=== Michael Spraggue series ===
- Blood Will Have Blood (1981)
- Bitter Finish (1982)
- Dead Heat (1984)
- Cities Of The Dead (1985)

=== Carlotta Carlyle series ===
- A Trouble Of Fools (1987)
- The Snake Tattoo (1989)
- Coyote (1990)
- Steel Guitar (1991)
- Snapshot (1993)
- Hardware (1995)
- Cold Case (1997)
- Flashpoint (1999)
- The Big Dig (2002)
- Deep Pockets (2004)
- Heart Of The World (2006)
- Lie Down With The Devil (2008)

=== Em Moore ===
- The Perfect Ghost (2013)
