= Robin Cook (American novelist) =

American physician and novelist (born 1940)

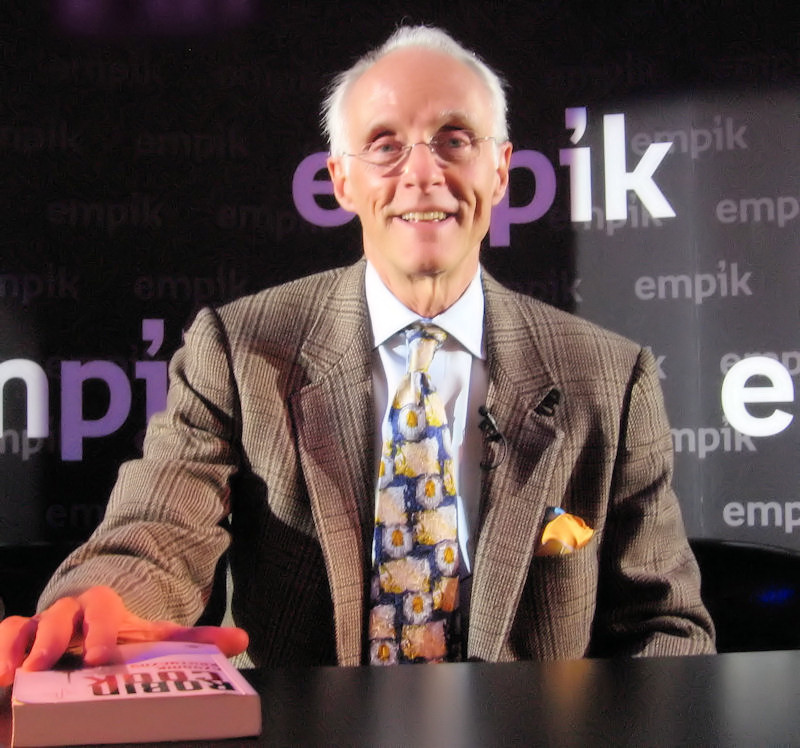
- Robin Cook in Warsaw (2008)
- Born: Robert Brian Cook; May 4, 1940 (age 86); Brooklyn, New York City, New York, United States
- Education: Wesleyan University (BS); Columbia University College of Physicians and Surgeons (MD); Ophthalmology at Harvard; Public policy at Harvard Kennedy School
- Occupations: Author; surgeon; ophthalmologist; aquanaut
- Relatives: Edgar Lee Cook (father); Audrey Cook (mother)
- Writing career
- Genre: Thriller
- Website: robincook.com

Robert Brian "Robin" Cook (born May 4, 1940) is an American physician and novelist who writes largely about medicine and topics affecting public health.

He is known best for combining medical writing with the thriller genre. Many of his books have been bestsellers on The New York Times Best Seller List. Several of his books have also been featured by Reader's Digest. His books have sold nearly 400 million copies worldwide.

== Early life and career ==
Cook was born in Brooklyn, New York, and grew up in Woodside, Queens. He relocated to Leonia, New Jersey when he was eight years old, where he could first have the "luxury" of having his own room. He graduated from Leonia High School in 1958.

Subsequently, Cook graduated from Wesleyan University and Columbia University College of Physicians and Surgeons, and finished his postgraduate medical training at Harvard.

Cook managed the Cousteau Society's blood-gas laboratory in the south of France. He later became an aquanaut with the U.S. Navy's SEALAB program when he was drafted in 1969. Cook served in the Navy from 1969 to 1971, attaining the rank of lieutenant commander. He wrote his first novel, Year of the Intern, while serving aboard the Polaris-type submarine USS Kamehameha.

== Novelist ==
The Year of the Intern, was a failure, but Cook began to study bestsellers. He said, "I studied how the reader was manipulated by the writer. I came up with a list of techniques that I wrote down on index cards. And I used every one of them in Coma." He conceived the idea for Coma, about creating illegally a supply of transplant organs, in 1975. In March 1977, that novel's paperback rights sold for $800,000. It was followed by the Egyptology thriller Sphinx in 1979 and another medical thriller, Brain, in 1981. Cook then decided he preferred writing rather than a medical career.

Cook's novels combine medical fact with fantasy. His medical thrillers are designed, in part, to keep the public aware of both the technological possibilities of modern medicine and the socio-ethical problems associated with it. Cook says he chose to write thrillers because they give him "an opportunity to get the public interested in things about medicine that they didn't seem to know about. I believe my books are actually teaching people."

The author admits he never thought that he would have such compelling material to work with when he began writing fiction in 1970. "If I tried to be the writer I am today a number of years ago, I wouldn't have very much to write about. But today, with the pace of change in biomedical research, there are any number of different issues, and new ones to come," he says.

Cook's novels have anticipated national controversy. In an interview with Stephen McDonald about the novel Shock, Cook admitted the book's timing was fortuitous:

I suppose that you could say that it's the most like Coma in fact that it deals with an issue that everybody seems to be concerned about. I wrote this book to address the stem cell issue, which the public really doesn't know anything about. Besides entertaining readers, my main goal is to get people interested in some of these issues, because it's the public that ultimately should be able to decide which way we ought to go in something as ethically questioning as stem cell research.

To date, Cook has fictionalized issues such as organ donation, fertility treatment, genetic engineering, in vitro fertilization, research funding, managed care, medical malpractice, medical tourism, drug research, and organ transplantation.

"I joke that if my books stop selling, I can always fall back on brain surgery," he says. "But I am still very interested in it. If I had to do it over again, I would still study medicine. I think of myself more as a doctor who writes, rather than a writer who happens to be a doctor." He explained the popularity of his works thus: "The main reason is, we all realize we are at risk. We're all going to be patients sometime," he says. "You can write about great white sharks or haunted houses, and you can say I'm not going into the ocean or I'm not going in haunted houses, but you can't say you're not going to go into a hospital."

Many of his novels concern hospitals (both fictional and non-fictional) in Boston, which may have to do with the fact that he had his post-graduate training at Harvard and lives in Boston, and/ or in New York.

=== Personal life ===
He is on leave from the Massachusetts Eye and Ear Infirmary.

Cook is a private member of the Woodrow Wilson Center's Board of Trustees. The Board of Trustees, directed by chairman Joseph B. Gildenhorn, are appointed to six-year terms by the President of the United States.

== Books ==
- Year of the Intern (1972), ISBN 978-0-451-16555-8
- Coma (1977), ISBN 978-0-451-20739-5
- Sphinx (1979), ISBN 978-0-451-15949-6
- Brain (1980), ISBN 978-0-399-12563-8
- Fever (1982), ISBN 978-0-425-17420-3
- Godplayer (1983), ISBN 978-0-425-17638-2
- Mindbend (1985), ISBN 978-0-451-14108-8
- Mortal Fear (1988), ISBN 978-0-425-11388-2
- Mutation (1989), ISBN 978-0-425-11965-5
- Harmful Intent (1990), ISBN 978-0-425-12546-5
- Terminal (1993), ISBN 978-0-425-15506-6
- Fatal Cure (1993), ISBN 978-0-425-14563-0
- Acceptable Risk (1995), ISBN 978-0-425-15186-0
- Invasion (1997), ISBN 978-0-425-21957-7
- Toxin (1998), ISBN 978-0-425-16661-1
- Abduction (2000), ISBN 978-0-425-17736-5
- Shock (2001), ISBN 978-0-425-18286-4
- Seizure (2003), ISBN 978-0-425-19794-3
- Cell (2014), ISBN 978-0-399-16630-3
- Host (2015), ISBN 978-0-399-17214-4
- Charlatans (2017), ISBN 978-0-735-21248-0
- Viral (2021), ISBN 978-0-593-32829-3
- Bellevue (2024), ISBN 978-0-593-71883-4

Dr. Marissa Blumenthal series

1. Outbreak (1987), ISBN 978-0-425-10687-7
2. Vital Signs (1991), ISBN 978-0-425-13176-3

Jack Stapleton and Laurie Montgomery series

1. Blindsight (1992), ISBN 978-0-425-13619-5
2. Contagion (1995), ISBN 978-0-425-15594-3
3. Chromosome 6 (1997), ISBN 978-0-425-16124-1
4. Vector (1999), ISBN 978-0-425-17299-5
5. Marker (2005), ISBN 978-0-425-20734-5
6. Crisis (2006), ISBN 978-0-425-21657-6
7. Critical (2007), ISBN 978-0-425-22288-1
8. Foreign Body (2008), ISBN 978-0-425-22895-1
9. Intervention (2009), ISBN 978-0-425-23538-6
10. Cure (2010), ISBN 978-0-425-24260-5
11. Pandemic (2018), ISBN 978-0-525-53534-8
12. Genesis (2019), ISBN 978-0-525-54215-5
13. Night Shift (2022), ISBN 978-1-529-09877-8
14. Manner of Death (2023), ISBN 978-0-593-71389-1
15. Spasm (2025), ISBN 979-8-217-04493-1
16. Bleed (2026), ISBN 978-1-037-41464-0

Pia Grazdani series

1. Death Benefit (2011), ISBN 978-0-425-25036-5
2. Nano (2013), ISBN 978-0-425-26134-7

== Movie and television adaptations ==
- Coma (1977) has been adapted for both film and television:
  - Coma (1978), a feature movie directed by author/doctor Michael Crichton and produced by Martin Erlichmann for Metro-Goldwyn-Mayer.
  - Coma (airdates September 3–4, 2012) a four-hour A&E television mini-series based on the 1977 novel and subsequent 1978 movie, directed by Mikael Salomon and produced by brothers Ridley and Tony Scott.
- Sphinx (1979) was adapted into the feature movie Sphinx (1981), directed by Franklin J. Schaffner, produced by Orion Pictures for Warner Bros., and featuring Lesley-Anne Down and Frank Langella.
- Harmful Intent (1990) was adapted as the CBS television movie Robin Cook's Harmful Intent (broadcast January 1, 1993), directed by John Patterson and produced by David A. Rosemont
- Mortal Fear (1988) was as an eponymous TV movie, broadcast November 20, 1994, directed by Larry Shaw
- Outbreak (1987) was adapted as the movie Virus (Formula For Death) (broadcast May 1995), directed by Armand Mastroianni.
- Terminal (1993) was adapted as a TV movie, directed by Larry Elikann.
- Invasion (1997) was adapted as an eponymous NBC TV mini-series (airdate May 4, 1997), directed by Armand Mastroianni.
- Acceptable Risk (1995) was adapted as a TV movie in 2001, directed by William A. Graham and starring Chad Lowe and Kelly Rutherford.
- Foreign Body (2008) resulted in a 2008 prequel, produced as an eponymous web series by the production companies Vuguru (owned by former Walt Disney CEO Michael Eisner), Cyber Group Studios (owned by the former Walt Disney executives Dominique Bourse and Pierre Sissmann), and Big Fantastic (owned by the creators of the web television series SamHas7Friends and Prom Queen). The series, which played from May 27 through August 4, 2008, comprised 50 episodes of approximately two minutes each, with a new video posted every weekday.
