= Blindsight (Cook novel) =

1992 novel by Robin Cook

- First edition (US)
- Author: Robin Cook
- Cover artist: Red Saunders
- Language: English
- Genre: Medical thriller
- Publisher: Putnam (US); Macmillan (UK)
- Publication date: January 6, 1992
- Publication place: United States
- Media type: Print (hardback & paperback)
- Pages: 429 pp
- ISBN: 0-330-32741-0
- OCLC: 28799170
- Preceded by: Vital Signs
- Followed by: Terminal

Blindsight is a novel by American writer Robin Cook, published by G. P. Putnam's Sons in 1992. It was released on January 6, 1992. Like most of Cook's other work, it is a medical thriller. This story introduces New York City pathologist Laurie Montgomery as being new to the medical examiner's office. She uncovers a series of drug overdoses and gangland-style murders with a grisly twist.

== Plot ==
An abnormal increase in the number of drug overdose cases makes Laurie seriously suspicious, and she starts investigating them. The going, however, is not smooth for Laurie. The Chief Medical Examiner Harold Bingham is adamant that no further investigation needs to be done; he's under heavy political pressure because of the death of a young banker, the son of a Senatorial candidate. Laurie is asked to write off his death as a normal one, even though his is a clear case of drug overdose. Though Laurie reluctantly agrees, she cannot stop herself from researching these drug overdose cases. She finds some common features, discovering that all these cases are related to young, rich and successful people, who normally would not be associated with such drug overdose cases.

At the same time, Lieutenant Lou Soldano is investigating what is behind a series of gangland-style murders. Lou meets Laurie, who is doing an autopsy for one of these cases. While they are involved only professionally, Lou is immediately smitten by Laurie's charm.

Meanwhile, Laurie's parents want her to marry Dr. Jordan Scheffield, a rich, self-contained ophthalmologist.

There is a separate plotline that involves Paul Cerino's hit men, Angelo and Tony, who roam around the city, killing people according to a "supply-demand" list that is given to them by Cerino.

Despite their mutual misunderstandings and many hurdles, Laurie and Lou manage to crack the case successfully. Their findings reveal a shocking organ trade related to the corneal surgeries that were done at the Manhattan General Hospital.
