= Jack Stapleton and Laurie Montgomery series =

Book series by Robin Cook

- Cover of the 1995 novel Contagion
- Blindsight; Contagion; Chromosome 6 Vector; Marker; Crisis; Critical; Foreign Body; Intervention; Cure; Death Benefit
- Author: Robin Cook
- Country: United States
- Language: English
- Genre: Medical thriller
- Publisher: Putnam Adult
- Published: 1992 - current
- Media type: Print (hardback, paperback), e-book, audiobook

The Jack Stapleton and Laurie Montgomery series is an ongoing series of New York Times Bestselling medical thrillers by Robin Cook that follows pathologist Jack Stapleton and his co-worker (and later wife) Laurie Montgomery as they attempt to solve the various mysteries that come across their path.

== Synopsis ==
The series follows Jack Stapleton, a medical examiner and pathologist who spends most of his free time focusing on various medical cases in order to avoid having to think about the deaths of his wife and children. He teams up with his co-worker and fellow pathologist Laurie Montgomery in order to solve various crimes, with the two eventually falling in love and marrying. Laurie was earlier in a relationship with Lou Soldano, a police officer and Jack and Laurie's mutual friend.

== Bibliography ==
1. Blindsight (1992)
2. Contagion (1995)
3. Chromosome 6 (1997)
4. Vector (1999)
5. Marker (2005)
6. Crisis (2006)
7. Critical (2008)
8. Foreign Body (2009)
9. Intervention (2009)
10. Cure (2010)
11. Pandemic (2018)
12. Genesis (2019)
13. Night Shift (2022)
14. Manner of Death (2023)

== Reception ==
Critical reception for the series as a whole has been mixed to positive, with later novels receiving mixed reviews from critics. Sales for the series have been good, with several of the novels placing on The New York Times Best Seller lists.

== Television series ==
In 1999 Cook announced that he was in talks with Jerry Bruckheimer to create a television series centered on the novels. No further information has been given about a potential series adaptation since that time.
