= The Last Hurrah (1977 film) =

- Based on: The Last Hurrah by Edwin O'Connor
- Written by: Carroll O'Connor
- Directed by: Vincent Sherman
- Starring: Carroll O'Connor; Patrick O'Neal; Dana Andrews; Mariette Hartley
- Music by: Peter Matz
- Country of origin: United States
- Original language: English

Production
- Executive producers: Carroll O'Connor; Terry Becker
- Producers: Franklin R. Levy; Mike Wise
- Cinematography: Gerald Perry Finnerman
- Editors: Bernard Balmuth; Les Green
- Running time: 105 minutes
- Production companies: Columbia Pictures Television; Hallmark Hall of Fame

Original release
- Network: NBC
- Release: November 16, 1977

The Last Hurrah is a 1977 American made-for-television political drama film based on the 1956 novel The Last Hurrah, by Edwin O'Connor, and starring Carroll O'Connor. It was directed by Vincent Sherman and originally aired on NBC as a presentation of Hallmark Hall of Fame on November 16, 1977.

Edwin O'Connor described Norman Cass as a "very old undergraduate". The film stars Carroll O'Connor, Leslie Ackerman, John Anderson, Dana Andrews, Mariette Hartley, Burgess Meredith and Patrick O'Neal.

Supporting cast included Robert Brown, Jack Carter, Tom Clancy, Arthur Franz, and Alan Hamel.

The novel was previously adapted for a 1958 film of the same title, starring Spencer Tracy.

== Plot ==
A big-city mayor, Frank Skeffington, runs a powerful political machine as he seeks a fourth term, but his age, health, and unhappy adversaries all stand in his way.

== Production ==
The Last Hurrah took nineteen days to film, but had twenty days in order to film according to director Vincent Sherman.

== Cast ==
- Carroll O'Connor as Frank Skeffington
- Leslie Ackerman as Prudy Cass
- John Anderson as Amos Force
- Dana Andrews as Roger Shanley
- Robert Brown as Nat Gardiner
- Jack Carter as Sam Weinberg
- Tom Clancy as Ditto Boland
- Brendan Dillon as John Gorman
- Arthur Franz as Hack Wiles
- Alan Hamel as George Sherrard
- Mariette Hartley as Clare Gardiner
- Stewart Moss as Winslow
- Burgess Meredith as Cardinal Burke
- Patrick O'Neal as Norman Cass
- Paul Picerni as Dr. Mike Santangelo
- Patrick Wayne as Robert 'Bobby' Skeffington
- Kitty Winn as Maeve Skeffington
- Mel Stewart as Herb Ripley
- Katharine Bard as Grace Minihan
- Bill Quinn as Jimmy Minihan
- Sandy Kenyon as Kane
- James B. Sikking as Monsignor Killian
- Arthur Batanides as Ben Morrow
- William 'Billy' Benedict as Willie Degman
- Harry Basch as Editor
- Lane Allan as Maj. O'Sullivan
- George Barrows as Tomasino
- Jack Griffin as Walsh
- Sal Vecchio as Narone
- Paul Napier as Collins
- Ricki Williams as Elaine
- Mike Walden as TV announcer
- Dennis McMullen as Sgt. Sullivan
- Larry McCormick as Election announcer
- Barbara Schillaci as Ms. Stone
- Paul L. Ehrmann as Restaurant captain (Paul Laurence)
- Elise O'Connor as Mrs. Cusack
