= Mariette Hartley =

American actress (born 1940)

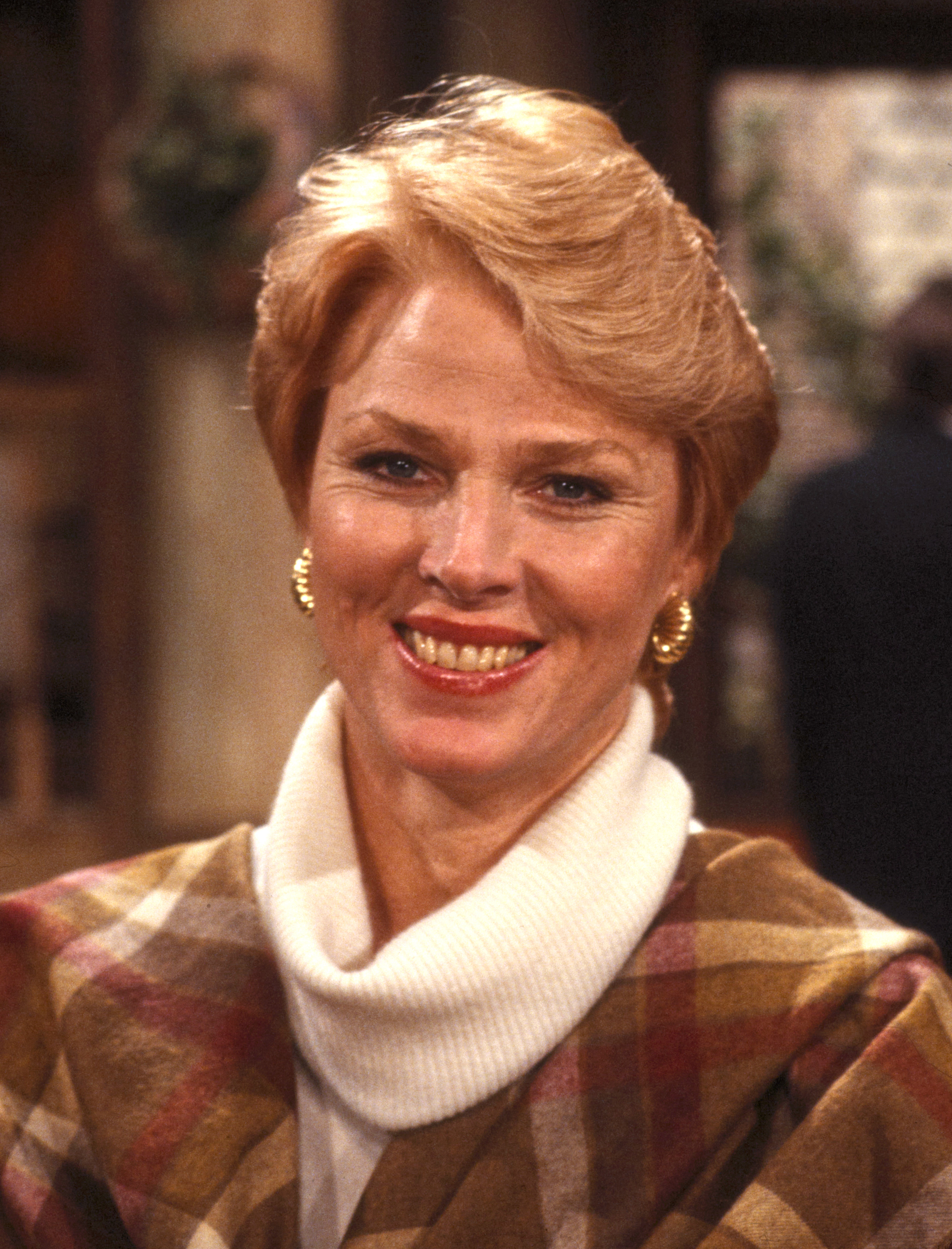
- Hartley co-hosting The Morning Program in 1987
- Born: June 21, 1940 (age 86); Weston, Connecticut, U.S.
- Education: Carnegie Institute of Technology (BFA)
- Occupation: Actress
- Years active: 1950s–present
- Spouses: John Sorrenti (m. 1960; div. 1963) Patrick Boyriven (m. 1978; div. 1996) Jerry Sroka (m. 2005)
- Children: 2
- Relatives: John B. Watson (grandfather)

Mariette Hartley (born June 21, 1940) is an American film and television actress. She is best known for her roles in film as Elsa Knudsen in Sam Peckinpah's Ride the High Country (1962), Susan Clabon in Alfred Hitchcock's Marnie (1964), and Betty Lloyd in John Sturges' Marooned (1969). She has appeared extensively on television, with notable roles as Claire Morton in the ABC soap opera Peyton Place (1965), various roles in the CBS television Western drama series Gunsmoke, and a series of commercials with James Garner in the 1970s and 1980s.

== Early life ==
Hartley was born in Weston, Connecticut, the daughter of Mary "Polly" Ickes (née Watson), a manager and saleswoman, and Paul Hembree Hartley, an account executive. Her maternal grandfather was John B. Watson, an American psychologist who established the psychological school of behaviorism. She grew up in Weston, an affluent Fairfield County suburb within commuting distance to Manhattan.

She graduated from the Carnegie Institute of Technology in Pittsburgh, Pennsylvania, in 1965.

== Career ==
=== Early appearances ===
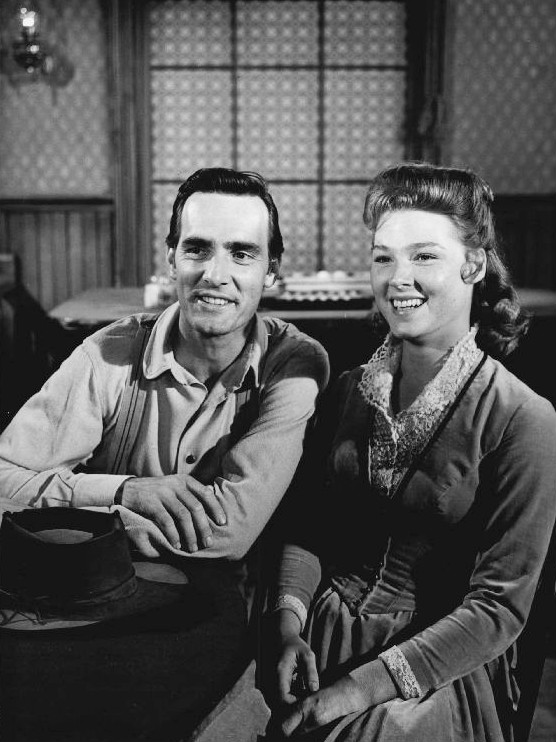
Hartley with Dennis Weaver in Gunsmoke (1962)

Hartley began her career as a 13-year-old in the White Barn Theatre in Norwalk, Connecticut. In her teens as a stage actress, she was coached and mentored by Eva Le Gallienne. She graduated in 1957 from Staples High School in Westport, Connecticut, where she was an active member of the school's theater group, Staples Players. While a student at Staples, she boldly telephoned screenwriter Rod Serling to ask him to speak in her class. Serling answered the call himself, chose to visit and speak in her classroom, and years later remembering their previous interaction, cast Hartley in an episode ("The Long Morrow") of The Twilight Zone. Hartley also worked at the American Shakespeare Festival.

Her film career began with an uncredited cameo appearance in From Hell to Texas (1958), a Western with Dennis Hopper. In the early 1960s, she moved to Los Angeles and joined the UCLA Theater Group.

Hartley's first credited film appearance was alongside Randolph Scott and Joel McCrea in the 1962 Sam Peckinpah Western Ride the High Country; the role earned her a BAFTA award nomination. She continued to appear in film during the 1960s, including the lead role in the adventure Drums of Africa (1963), and prominent supporting roles in Alfred Hitchcock's psychological thriller Marnie (1964) — alongside Tippi Hedren and Sean Connery — and the John Sturges drama Marooned (1969).

Hartley also guest-starred in numerous TV series during the decade, with appearances in Gunsmoke (five times including the title character in "Cotter's Girl" in 1962); The Travels of Jaimie McPheeters; Death Valley Days; Judd, for the Defense; Bonanza; and Star Trek (as Zarabeth, Spock's love interest in the episode "All Our Yesterdays", which aired on March 13, 1969) among others. In 1965, she had a significant role as Dr. Claire Morton in 32 episodes of Peyton Place.

=== 1970s and 1980s ===
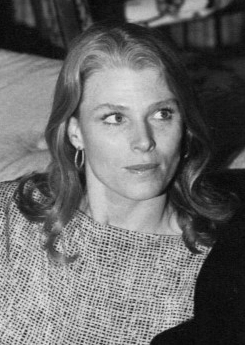
Hartley in 1977

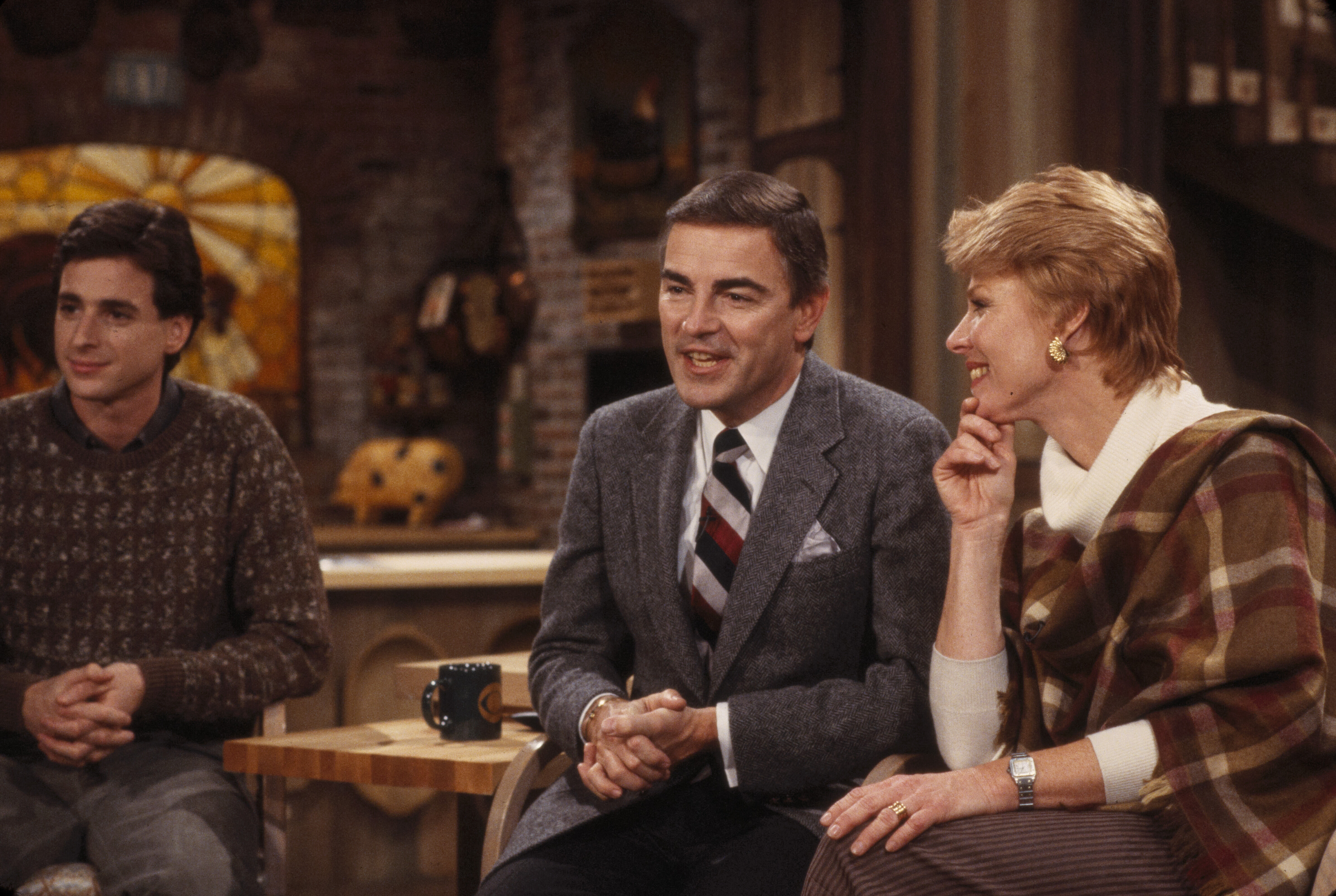
Bob Saget, Rolland Smith and Hartley on the CBS "Morning Program"

Hartley continued to perform in film and TV during the 1970s, including two Westerns alongside Lee Van Cleef, Barquero (1970) and The Magnificent Seven Ride! (1972); and TV series including The Love Boat; The Streets of San Francisco; Emergency!; McCloud; Little House on the Prairie; Love, American Style; Police Woman; and Columbo (1974's Publish or Perish co-starring Jack Cassidy and 1977's Try and Catch Me with Ruth Gordon). Hartley portrays similar characters as a publisher's assistant in both episodes.

In 1977, Hartley appeared in the TV movie The Last Hurrah, a political drama based on the Edwin O'Connor novel of the same name; and earned her first Emmy Award nomination.

Her role as psychologist Dr. Carolyn Fields in "Married", a 1978 episode of the TV series The Incredible Hulk – in which she marries Bill Bixby's character, the alter ego of the Hulk, won Hartley the Primetime Emmy Award for Outstanding Lead Actress in a Drama Series. She was nominated for the same award for her performance in an episode of The Rockford Files the following year.

In 1983, Hartley reunited with Bixby in the sitcom Goodnight, Beantown, which ran for two seasons and brought her another Emmy Award nomination. (She worked with Bixby again in the 1992 TV movie A Diagnosis of Murder, the first of three TV movies that launched the series Diagnosis: Murder).

In 1987, she co-hosted CBS's The Morning Program weekday morning news show alongside Rolland Smith, for ten months.

=== Later career ===
In the 1990s, Hartley toured with Elliott Gould and Doug Wert in the revival of the mystery play Deathtrap. Numerous roles in TV movies and guest appearances in TV series during the 1990s and 2000s followed, including Murder, She Wrote (1992), Courthouse (1995), Nash Bridges (2000), and NCIS (2005). She had recurring roles as Sister Mary Daniel in the soap opera One Life to Live (1999–2001; 10 episodes), and as Lorna Scarry in six episodes of Law & Order: Special Victims Unit (2003–2011).

From 1995 to 2015, she hosted the long-running television documentary series Wild About Animals, an educational program.

In 2006, Hartley starred in her own one-woman show, If You Get to Bethlehem, You've Gone Too Far, which ran in Los Angeles. She returned to the stage in 2014 as Eleanor of Aquitaine (with Ian Buchanan as Henry) in the Colony Theater Company production of James Goldman's The Lion in Winter.

In January 2018, Hartley began a recurring role on the Fox first-responder drama 9-1-1 as Patricia Clark, the Alzheimer's-afflicted mother of dispatcher Abby Clark (Connie Britton).

=== Advertising ===
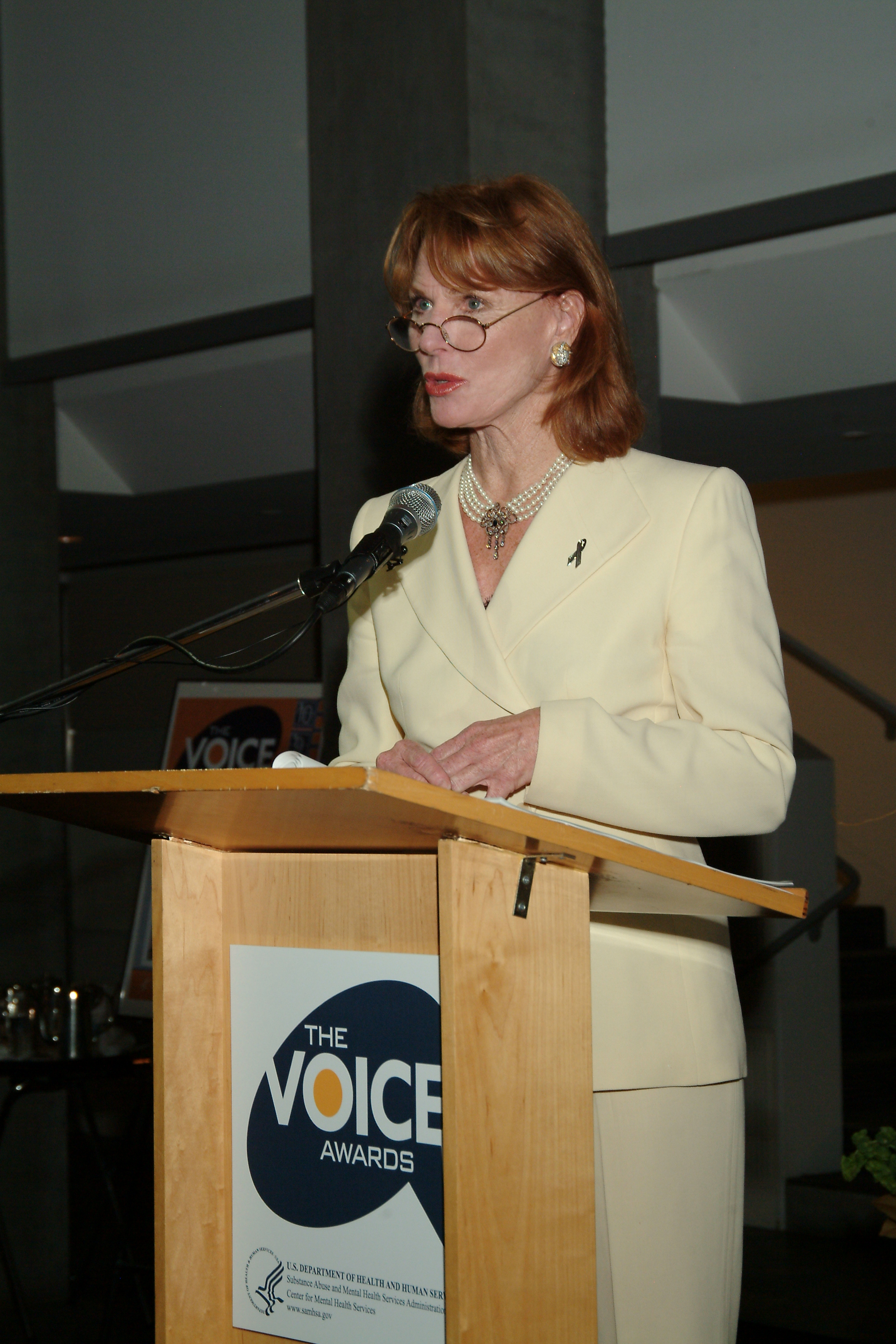
Hartley at the 2005 Voice Awards

In the late 1970s and early 1980s, Hartley appeared with James Garner in a popular series of television commercials advertising Polaroid cameras. The two actors had such natural on-screen chemistry that many viewers erroneously believed that they were married in real life. Hartley's 1990 biography, Breaking the Silence, indicates that she began to wear a T-shirt printed with the phrase "I am not Mrs. James Garner." (Hartley went as far to have a shirt made for her infant son, reading "I am not James Garner's Child" and even one for her then-husband: "I am not James Garner!" James Garner's actual wife then jokingly had a T-shirt printed with "I am Mrs. James Garner.") Hartley guest-starred in an episode of Garner's television series The Rockford Files in 1979. The script required the two to kiss at one point and unbeknownst to them, a paparazzo was photographing the scene from a distance. The photos were run in a tabloid trying to provoke a scandal. An article that ran in TV Guide was titled: "That woman is not James Garner's wife!"

Between 2001 and 2006, Hartley endorsed the See Clearly Method, a commercial eye exercise program, whose sales were halted by an Iowa court after a finding of fraudulent business practices and advertising.

== Honors ==
Hartley received an honorary degree from Rider College in 1993.

== Personal life ==
Hartley has been married three times. Her first marriage was to John Sorrenti (1960–1963). She married Patrick Boyriven on August 13, 1978; they had two children. The couple divorced in 1996. In 2005, Hartley married Jerry Sroka. Hartley and Sroka co-wrote and starred in a romantic comedy film based on their lives titled Our Almost Completely True Story, released in 2022.

In her 1990 autobiography Breaking the Silence, written with Anne Commire, Hartley talked about her struggles with psychological problems, pointing directly to her grandfather's (John B. Watson) practical application of his theories as the source of the dysfunction in his family. She has also spoken in public about her experience with bipolar disorder and was a founder of the American Foundation for Suicide Prevention. She currently serves as the foundation's national spokesperson.

In 2003, Hartley was hired by pharmaceutical company GlaxoSmithKline to increase awareness of bipolar medications and treatments. She frequently promotes awareness of bipolar disorder and suicide prevention.

In 2009, Hartley spoke at a suicide and violence prevention forum about her father's suicide.

== Filmography ==
=== Films ===
Year	Title	Role	Notes
1958	From Hell to Texas		Uncredited
1962	Ride the High Country	Elsa Knudsen	Nominated—BAFTA Award for Most Promising Newcomer to Leading Film Roles{under title "Guns in the Afternoon"
1963	Drums of Africa	Ruth Knight	
1964	Marnie	Susan Clabon	
1969	Marooned	Betty Lloyd	
1969	The Vendors	Hooker	
1970	Barquero	Anna	
1971	The Return of Count Yorga	Cynthia Nelson	
1972	Skyjacked	Harriet Stevens	
1972	The Magnificent Seven Ride!	Arrila	
1973	Genesis II	Lyra-a	
1981	Improper Channels	Diana Martley	
1982	O'Hara's Wife	Harry O'Hara	
1988	1969	Jessie Denny	
1992	Encino Man	Mrs. Morgan	Also known as California Man
1996	Snitch	Kinnison	
2003	Baggage	Emily Wade	
2006	Novel Romance	Marty McCall	
2009	The Inner Circle	Sister Madeleine	
2016	Three Days in August	Maureen	
2016	Silver Skies	Harriet	
2017	Counting for Thunder	Tina Stalworth	
2019	The Message	Esther Barnes	
2022	Our (Almost Completely True) Love Story	Mariette	

=== Television ===
Year	Title	Role	Notes
1962	Stoney Burke	Laura Grayson	Episode: "Bandwagon"
1963–1964	Breaking Point	Various	2 episodes
1963–1974	Gunsmoke	Claire Cotter, various others	5 episodes
1963	Dr. Kildare	Ellen Hendricks	Episode: "Face of Fear"
1963	Ben Casey	Julie Carr	Episode: "For I Will Plait thy Hair with Gold"
1963	The Travels of Jaimie McPheeters	Hagar Menifee	Episode: "The Day of the Misfits"
1963	Channing	Evelyn Crown	Episode: "The Last Testament of Buddy Crown"
1964	The Twilight Zone	Sandra Horn	Episode: "The Long Morrow"
1964	The Virginian	Various	2 episodes
1964	My Three Sons	Mary Kathleen Connolly	2 episodes
1965–1968	Death Valley Days	Various	4 episodes
1965–1971	Bonanza	Various	4 episodes
1965	Peyton Place	Claire Morton	32 episodes
1966–1967	The Hero	Ruth Garret	16 episodes
1966	The Legend of Jesse James	Polly Dockery	Episode: "A Burying for Rosey"
1967	He & She	Dorothy Webb	Episode: "The Coming-Out Party"
1968, 1970	Daniel Boone	Various	2 episodes
1968	Judd, for the Defense	Erica Cosgrove	Episode: "No Law Against Murder"
1968	Cimarron Strip	Jessica Cabot	Episode: "Big Jessie"
1969	The Outsider	Mary Smith	Episode: "The Girl from Missouri"
1969	Star Trek: The Original Series	Zarabeth	Episode: "All Our Yesterdays" (S3:E23)
1970, 1973	The F.B.I.	Various	2 episodes
1970, 1975	Insight	Various	2 episodes
1970	Love, American Style	Ruth Dabb	Episode: "Love and the Fighting Couple"
1970	Marcus Welby, M.D.	Maggie Lynch	Episode: "To Carry the Sun in a Golden Cup"
1971	Cade's County	Frances Pilgrim	Episode: "The Armageddon Contract"
1971	Earth II	Lisa Karger	TV movie
1972	Mannix	Nurse Cara Guild	Episode: "Death Is the Fifth Gear"
1972	Night Gallery	Prof. Diana Parker/Terry Parker	Episode: "Eye of the Haunted"
1972	Sandcastles	Sarah	TV movie
1972	The Delphi Bureau	Sarah Bowmont	Episode: "The White Plague Project"
1972	Ghost Story	Sheila Conway	Episode: "Cry of the Cat"
1972	The Bold Ones: The New Doctors	Helen Burke	Episode: "A Purge of Madness"
1973–1974	The Streets of San Francisco	Various	2 episodes
1973	The Mystery in Dracula's Castle	Marsha Booth	TV movie
1973	The Magical World of Disney	Marsha Booth	2 episodes
1973	The F.B.I.	Doe Riley	Episode: The Double Play
1973	Genesis II	Lyra-a	TV movie
1973	The Bob Newhart Show	Marilyn Dietz	Episode: "Have You Met Miss Dietz?"
1973	Emergency!	Vera Mannering	Episode: "Zero"
1973	Owen Marshall, Counselor at Law	Roberta Laughlin	Episode: "Snatches of a Crazy Song"
1974, 1977	Columbo	Various	2 episodes
1974	The Wide World of Mystery	Various	2 episodes
1974	Friends and Lovers	Sandra	Episode: "Moran's the Man"
1974	Barnaby Jones	Various	2 episodes
1975	McCloud	Ann Lassiter	Episode: "Lady on the Run"
1976	Little House on the Prairie	Elizabeth Thurmond	Episode: "For My Lady"
1976	The Killer Who Wouldn't Die	Heather McDougall	TV movie
1976	The Quest	Vay	Episode: "Shanklin"
1976	Most Wanted	Lt. Ruth Massey	Episode: "The Corrupter"
1977	Police Woman	Gloria Turner	Episode: "Banker's Hours"
1977	Delvecchio	Angela Atkins	Episode: "Dying Can Be a Pleasure"
1977	The African Queen	Rose Sayer	TV movie
1977	Kingston: Confidential	Kathleen Morgan	Episode: "Shadow Game"
1977	The Last Hurrah	Clare Gardiner	TV movie Nominated—Primetime Emmy Award for Outstanding Supporting Actress in a Limited Series or Movie
1977	The Oregon Trail	Susan	Episode: "Wagon Race"
1978	Logan's Run	Ariana	Episode: "Futurepast"
1978	The Incredible Hulk	Dr. Carolyn Fields	Episode: "Married"; Primetime Emmy Award for Outstanding Lead Actress in a Drama Series
1979	M*A*S*H	Dr. Inga Halvorsen	Episode: "Inga"
1979	A Rainy Day	Stephanie Carter	Short
1979	Stone	Mrs. Diane Stone	Pilot
1979	The Rockford Files	Althea Morgan	Episode: "Paradise Cove"; Nominated—Primetime Emmy Award for Outstanding Lead Actress in a Drama Series
1979	The Halloween That Almost Wasn't	The Witch	Short; Nominated—Primetime Emmy Award for Outstanding Children's Program
1980	The Love Tapes	Barbara Welles	TV movie
1980	The Secret War of Jackie's Girls	Jackie	TV movie
1981	No Place to Hide	Adele Manning	TV movie
1982	Drop-Out Father	Katherine McCall	TV movie
1983–1984	Goodnight, Beantown	Jennifer Barnes	18 episodes Nominated—Primetime Emmy Award for Outstanding Lead Actress in a Comedy Series
1983	M.A.D.D.: Mothers Against Drunk Drivers	Candy Lightner	TV movie Nominated—Primetime Emmy Award for Outstanding Lead Actress in a Limited Series or Movie
1983	The Love Boat	Martha Chambers	2 episodes
1984	Silence of the Heart	Barbara Lewis	TV movie
1985	The Greatest Adventure: Stories from the Bible	Rahab	Episode: "Joshua and the Battle of Jericho"
1986	One Terrific Guy	Mrs. Burton	TV movie
1986	My Two Loves	Gail Springer	TV movie
1989	Passion and Paradise	Lady Oakes	TV movie
1990–1991	WIOU	Liz McVay	14 episodes
1990	Murder C.O.D.	Sally Kramer	TV movie
1992	A Diagnosis of Murder	Kate Hamilton	TV movie
1992	Murder on Sycamore Street	Kate Hamilton	TV movie
1992	Child of Rage	Dr. Rosemary Myers	TV movie
1992	Murder, She Wrote	Susan Lindsay	Episode: "Night of the Coyote"
1993	Perry Mason: The Case of the Telltale Talk Show Host	Dr. Sheila Carlin	TV movie
1994	Heaven & Hell: North & South, Book III	Prudence	Miniseries
1995–2015	Wild About Animals	Hostess	70 episodes
1995	Freefall: Flight 174	Beth Pearson	TV movie
1995	Courthouse	Judge Katherine Wilkes	Episode: "Justice Delayed"
1996	Caroline in the City	Margaret Duffy	Episode: "Caroline and the Twenty-Eight-Pound Walleye"
1998	Conan the Adventurer	Queen Veeta	Episode: "Heir Apparent"
1998	To Have & to Hold	Ellen Cornell	8 episodes
1999–2001	One Life to Live	Sister Mary Daniel	10 episodes
1999	Kismet	Mother	Short
1999	The Brothers Flub	Voice	16 episodes
1999	Twice in a Lifetime	Brooke Canby/Janet Bryant	Episode: "O'er the Rampants We Watched"
2000	Nash Bridges	Libby	Episode: "Manhunt"
2001	Kate Brasher	Gloria Raskin	Episode: "Simon"
2003–2011	Law & Order: Special Victims Unit	Lorna Scarry	6 episodes
2004	Single Santa Seeks Mrs. Claus	Joanna	TV movie
2005	NCIS	Hanna Lowell	Episode: "SWAK"
2005	Meet the Santas	Joanna	TV movie
2007	Love Is a Four Letter Word	Audrey	TV movie
2007	Dirt	Dorothy Spiller	2 episodes
2008	Saving Grace	Emily Jane Ada	Episode: "You Are My Partner"
2008	Grey's Anatomy	Betty Kenner	2 episodes
2008	Cold Case	Gloria Flagstone '08	Episode: "Wings"
2009	The Cleaner	Jane O'Hara	Episode: "Hello America"
2010	Nurses Who Kill...	Paulette	Short
2011	Big Love	Major	Episode: "A Seat at the Table"
2013	The Mentalist	Elise Vogelson	Episode: "Red Lacquer Nail Polish"
2014–2015	The Comeback Kids	Richie's Mom	4 episodes
2014–2018	Fireside Chat with Esther	Various	10 episodes
2015	The Dentros	Joan Dentro	Short
2018	9-1-1	Patricia Clark	7 episodes
2019	Homeless at 17	Marnie	TV movie
2019	House on the Hill (aka He's Out to Get You)	Ellen Snow	TV movie
2020	Escaping My Stalker	Grandmother	TV movie
