= I Was Dancing =

- First edition of I Was Dancing (published by Little Brown
- Written by: Edwin O'Connor
- Original language: English

Premiere
- Date premiered: November 3, 1964
- Place premiered: Broadway at the Lyceum Theatre

I Was Dancing is a play by Edwin O'Connor. The work premiered on Broadway at the Lyceum Theatre on November 3, 1964, and closed after 21 performances on November 21, 1964. The production was directed by Garson Kanin and starred Orson Bean, David Doyle, Barnard Hughes, Pert Kelton, Burgess Meredith, and Eli Mintz.
