= Drive a Crooked Road =

1954 film by Richard Quine

- Theatrical release poster
- Directed by: Richard Quine
- Screenplay by: Blake Edwards
- Story by: James Benson Nablo
- Based on: The Wheel Man by James Benson Nablo
- Produced by: Jonie Taps
- Starring: Mickey Rooney; Dianne Foster
- Cinematography: Charles Lawton Jr.
- Edited by: Jerome Thoms
- Music by: Ross DiMaggio
- Production company: Columbia Pictures
- Distributed by: Columbia Pictures
- Release date: March 10, 1954 (United States)
- Running time: 83 minutes
- Country: United States
- Language: English

Drive a Crooked Road is a 1954 American crime film noir directed by Richard Quine and starring Mickey Rooney and Dianne Foster. The drama's screenplay was adapted by Blake Edwards and Richard Quine from "The Wheel Man", a story by Canadian James Benson Nablo.

== Plot ==
Mechanic and race car driver Eddie Shannon is chosen by two bank robbers, Steve Norris and his girlfriend Barbara Mathews, to help them with a heist. The heist requires someone with his ability to "soup up" engines and drive at high speeds over treacherous roads, to avoid capture after they pull the job. To bait the driver into the dangerous scheme, Steve uses Barbara to help persuade Eddie to assist with the crime—though his share of the heist would also make it possible for him to achieve his dream of racing competitively in Europe, the money alone wouldn't be sufficient inducement. Barbara increasingly feels ashamed of leading Eddie on, and develops some feelings for him. This leads to his discovery of the way he's been used, triggering a deadly confrontation at the end.

== Cast ==
- Mickey Rooney as Eddie Shannon
- Dianne Foster as Barbara Mathews
- Kevin McCarthy as Steve Norris
- Jack Kelly as Harold Baker
- Harry Landers as Ralph
- Jerry Paris as Phil
- Paul Picerni as Carl
- Dick Crockett as Don

== Critical reception ==
TV Guide called the film "A crisply done film noir with Rooney taken in by the universal emotional state that was at the root of many noir heroes' problems, loneliness."

The Philadelphia Inquirer was complimentary: "Apart from being a very fair melodrama ... [the film] ... serves as a reminder that, given the right role and good direction, Mickey Rooney is a talented young actor ... The film, as well as Rooney, stands up all the way. So do all the others in Columbia's small, handpicked cast ... first honors go uncontested to the 32-year-old star for a fine, affecting, and unaffected performance."
