= Monkey on My Back (film) =

1957 American film by Andre de Toth

- Directed by: Andre de Toth
- Written by: Paul Dudley; Anthony Veiller; Crane Wilbur
- Based on: book by Barney Ross
- Produced by: Edward Small
- Starring: Cameron Mitchell; Dianne Foster
- Cinematography: Maury Gertsman
- Edited by: Grant Whytock
- Music by: Paul Sawtell; Bert Shefter
- Production company: Imperial Pictures
- Distributed by: United Artists
- Release date: May 29, 1957
- Running time: 94 minutes
- Country: United States
- Language: English

Monkey on My Back is a 1957 American biographical film directed by Andre de Toth. It stars Cameron Mitchell as Barney Ross, a real-life world champion boxer and World War II hero. Though heavily fictionalized, the film deals with Ross's addiction to heroin.

== Plot ==
In the 1930s, boxer Barney Ross wins the welterweight championship, then meets chorus girl Cathy Holland as he celebrates. Sam Pian, his trainer, learns that Barney placed a $10,000 bet on himself to win the fight. Barney's love interest is Cathy, a single mother of a girl named Noreen, who is unaware of his gambling habit. When Barney loses a fight, he owes thousands to a bookie named Big Ralph and is forced to work in Ralph's bar to pay the debt.

Barney joins the Marines when war breaks out. He marries Cathy before leaving for the South Pacific, where he saves another soldier's life at Guadalcanal to earn the Silver Star. But he also contracts malaria, for which a medic prescribes morphine.

Back home in Chicago, Barney takes a job with a public-relations firm by the father of the man whose life he saved. Barney is now addicted to morphine and incurs a huge debt to Rico, a drug pusher. Cathy catches her desperate husband breaking into Noreen's piggy bank, so she moves out.

Barney becomes suicidal, but when his wife returns to inform him that Rico has been arrested, he vows to beat his addiction. He checks into a hospital in Kentucky while the whole country becomes aware of his plight. Four months later, Barney is permitted to leave, rejoin his family and resume his life.

== Cast ==
- Cameron Mitchell as Barney Ross
- Dianne Foster as Cathy Holland
- Paul Richards as Rico (as Paul E. Richards)
- Jack Albertson as Sam Pian
- Kathy Garver as Noreen
- Barry Kelley as Big Ralph
- Dayton Lummis as J. L. McAvoy
- Lewis Charles as Lew Surati
- Raymond Greenleaf as Dr. A. J. Latham
- Richard Benedict as Art Winch
- Brad Harris as Spike McAvoy
- Chris Alcaide as Benjy
- Lisa Golm as Barney's mother
- Duke Fishman as Hospital Patient

== Production ==
Film rights to Barney Ross's story were bought in July 1955 by Imperial Pictures, a company owned by Edward Small. At the time it was titled God Was in My Corner.

The Motion Picture Association of America demanded the removal of a scene in which Barney inserts a hypodermic needle into his arm. Producer Edward Small appealed the directive and then released the film without the Production Code seal of approval, claiming that he had not heard a response to his appeal for two weeks. This made Monkey on My Back the first film to run afoul of the Production Code since the code had been revised to allow treatment of illicit narcotics within limits.

== Reception ==
In a contemporary review for The New York Times, critic Bosley Crowther dismissed Monkey on My Back as "a serious but largely unimaginative study of one man's triumph over a horrible craving" and "by and large, unsensational drama."

== See also ==
- List of American films of 1957
- List of boxing films
- List of drug films
