= The Edge of Sadness =

1961 novel by Edwin O'Connor

- First edition
- Author: Edwin O'Connor
- Language: English
- Publisher: Little, Brown
- Publication date: 1961
- Publication place: United States
- Media type: Print (hardback & paperback)
- Pages: 460

The Edge of Sadness is a novel by the American author Edwin O'Connor. It was published in 1961 and won the Pulitzer Prize for Fiction in 1962. The story is about a middle-aged Catholic priest in New England.

== Story ==
This drama revolves around Father Hugh Kennedy, a recovering alcoholic. In the beginning of the story Kennedy has returned to his home town (an unnamed New England seaport city that is the seat of a bishop, rather than an archbishop; it thus most closely corresponds with O'Connor's own birthplace of Providence, RI) to try to mend his professional career as a priest. He becomes involved again with the Carmodys, a wealthy family whose ancestry, like his own, is Irish and whom he has known since childhood. The story that unfolds is a tale of long hidden emotion and longing. It deals with friendship and loneliness, spirituality, and newfound hope.
