= Dianne Foster =

Canadian actress (1928–2019)

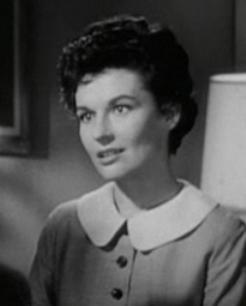
- Foster in The Last Hurrah (1958)
- Born: Olga Helen Laruska; October 31, 1928; Edmonton, Alberta, Canada
- Died: July 27, 2019 (aged 90); Hidden Hills, California
- Occupations: Actress; model
- Years active: 1951–1966
- Spouse(s): Andrew Allan (m. 1951; div. 195?) Joel Murcott (m. 1954; div. 1959) Harold Rowe (m. 1961; died 1994)
- Children: 3

Dianne Foster (born Olga Helen Laruska; October 31, 1928 – July 27, 2019) was a Canadian actress of Ukrainian descent.

== Early life ==
Foster was born in Edmonton, Alberta, Canada. She began her career at the age of 13 in a stage adaptation of James Barrie's What Every Woman Knows. In London in 1951, she appeared on stage in Agatha Christie's The Hollow and Orson Welles's Othello.

At 14, she began a radio career, subsequently moved to Toronto, and became one of Canada's top radio stars, working with Andrew Allan, drama supervisor for the Canadian Broadcasting Corporation on productions such as Stage '49. She appeared on Radio Luxembourg in a broadcast of The Lives of Harry Lime. She became a Walter Thornton model and also taught modeling at the Thornton school. She married Andrew Allan in 1951.

== Film ==
In March 1952, her husband returned to Canada, while she stayed in London, to honour her five-year contract with a British film company. In 1953, she co-starred alongside Charlton Heston and Lizabeth Scott in the middling Bad for Each Other. In 1954, she was signed by Columbia Pictures and relocated to Hollywood, where her first appearance proper that year was with Mickey Rooney in Drive a Crooked Road. In 1955, Foster appeared on the cover of Picturegoer and co-starred in two films, Glenn Ford's The Violent Men and Burt Lancaster's The Kentuckian.

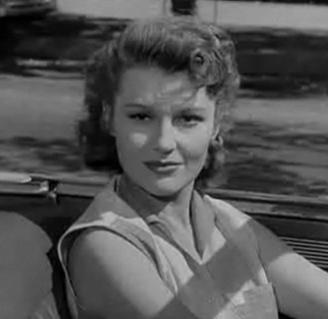
Foster in Drive a Crooked Road (1954)

Although her film career continued, it was not on the same upward trajectory as before. In 1957, she co-starred in the biopic Monkey on My Back about boxer Barney Ross, Night Passage with James Stewart, and The Brothers Rico with Richard Conte. In 1958, she starred with Alan Ladd in The Deep Six, and that same year, she appeared alongside Jack Hawkins in Gideon of Scotland Yard before her last really big picture, The Last Hurrah. It featured an all-star cast that included Spencer Tracy, Pat O'Brien, and Basil Rathbone, and was nominated for a BAFTA award. In 1963, she made her last film appearance, in the Dean Martin vehicle Who's Been Sleeping in My Bed?.

== Television ==
In 1960, Foster was the title guest star in the episode "Lawyer in Petticoats" on the short-lived NBC Western series Overland Trail starring William Bendix and Doug McClure. Foster also appeared in 1960 in three other NBC Westerns, Bonanza (as Joyce Edwards in "The Mill"), Wagon Train (as Leslie Ivers in "Trial for Murder: Part 2"), and Riverboat (as Marian Templeton in "Path of the Eagle"). Also in 1960, she appeared in Have Gun - Will Travel season four, episode 20.

After a three-year absence, she returned to the big screen in King of the Roaring 20's - The Story of Arnold Rothstein, playing Carolyn Green Rothstein, wife of the title character. Foster continued to appear in television programs, such as the Wild Wild West episode "The Night of the Lord of Limbo", CBS's The Lloyd Bridges Show (1962–1963), the ABC medical drama Breaking Point (1963–1964), and The Fugitive. Foster appeared as a pilot in an episode of My Three Sons, as a woman's editor of Home Decorator Magazine Incorporated in another episode of My Three Sons, as a librarian in a 1964 episode of Petticoat Junction, and as Amy Collins in the 1965 Green Acres episode "How to See South America by Bus". She guest-starred in the ABC drama Going My Way, starring Gene Kelly. She made four guest appearances on Perry Mason between 1962 and 1965, an episode of Honey West, "A Matter of Wife and Death" (episode 4) in 1965, and appeared in the "Caesar's Wife" episode of The Big Valley in 1966. Dianne Foster also appeared on two episodes of Tales of Wells Fargo (1960 and 1962).Diane Foster also appeared on maverick with James garner in the 1950's

== Personal life and death ==
In 1951, Foster married Andrew Allan, head radio drama supervisor for the Canadian Broadcasting Corporation, in London. They soon divorced, and in 1954, she married Joel A. Murcott, a Hollywood radio-television scriptwriter, in Owensboro, Kentucky. On February 14, 1956, she gave birth to twins—a son, Jason, and a daughter, Jodi. That same year, she also filed for divorce from Murcott. She asked for custody and $1 in token alimony. The couple reconciled, but it proved to be temporary, as they separated twice more before finally divorcing in 1959. In 1961, Foster married her third husband, Harold Rowe, a Van Nuys dentist. On November 14, 1963, their son, Dustin Louis Rowe, was born in Los Angeles.

Foster died in July 2019 at the age of 90.

== Selected filmography ==
- The Quiet Woman (1951)
- The Steel Key (1953)
- Isn't Life Wonderful! (1953)
- Bad for Each Other (1953)
- Drive a Crooked Road (1954)
- Three Hours to Kill (1954)
- The Bamboo Prison (1954)
- The Violent Men (1955)
- The Kentuckian (1955)
- Monkey on My Back (1957)
- Night Passage (1957)
- The Brothers Rico (1957)
- The Deep Six (1958)
- Gideon's Day (or Gideon of Scotland Yard) (1958)
- The Last Hurrah (1958)
- King of the Roaring '20s: The Story of Arnold Rothstein (1961)
- Gunsmoke (1962) S7E23 "Reprisal" as Cornellia
- Who's Been Sleeping in My Bed? (1963)
