= Paul Picerni =

American actor (1922–2011)

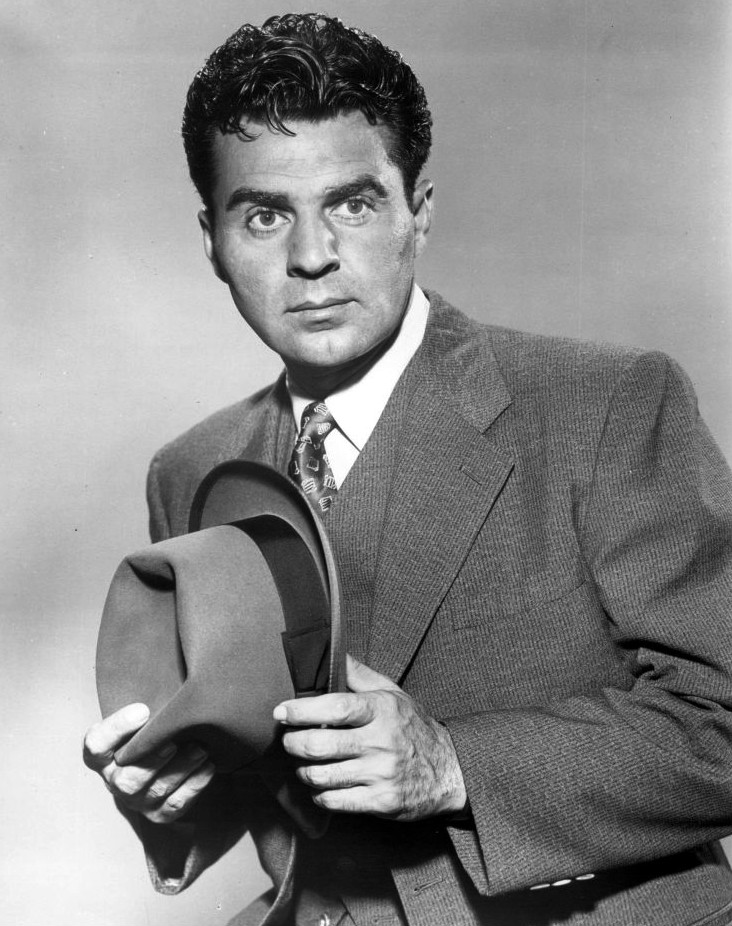
- Picerni as Untouchable Lee Hobson (1961)
- Born: Horacio Paul Picerni; December 1, 1922; New York City, U.S.
- Died: January 12, 2011 (aged 88); Palmdale, California, U.S.
- Resting place: San Fernando Mission Cemetery, Los Angeles, California, U.S.
- Other name: Horacio Paul Picerni
- Education: Loyola Marymount University
- Occupation: Actor
- Years active: 1946–2007
- Spouse: Marie Mason (m. 1947)
- Children: 8

Horacio Paul Picerni (December 1, 1922 – January 12, 2011) was an American actor in film and television, perhaps best known today in the role of Federal Agent Lee Hobson, second-in-command to Robert Stack's Eliot Ness, in the ABC hit television series, The Untouchables.

== Early years ==
Picerni was born in New York City to an Italian family. Raised in Corona, Queens, he was an Eagle Scout in his youth and adolescence. After high school, Picerni studied drama at Loyola University.

== Military service ==
Picerni joined the United States Army Air Forces during World War II and served as a B-24 Liberator bombardier in the China-Burma-India Theater. He flew twenty-five combat missions with the 493rd Bomb Squadron of the 7th Bomb Group and received the Distinguished Flying Cross.

He was part of a mission that attacked and destroyed the actual bridge made famous in the film The Bridge on the River Kwai (1957). After the Japanese surrendered, Picerni became a Special Services officer in India. Following his discharge, he enrolled at Loyola Marymount University in Los Angeles.

== Film ==
As a young actor returning from the war, Picerni appeared in military pictures: in Twelve O'Clock High (1949) as a bombardier and as Private Edward P. Rojeck in Breakthrough. This led to a Warner Brothers contract and a succession of roles at that studio including a Portuguese Socialist "Red" agitator in 1952's The Miracle of Our Lady of Fatima and the hero of the 1953 horror classic House of Wax. After his departure from Warners, he appeared with Audie Murphy in Universal Studio's To Hell and Back.

== Television ==
=== Regular roles ===
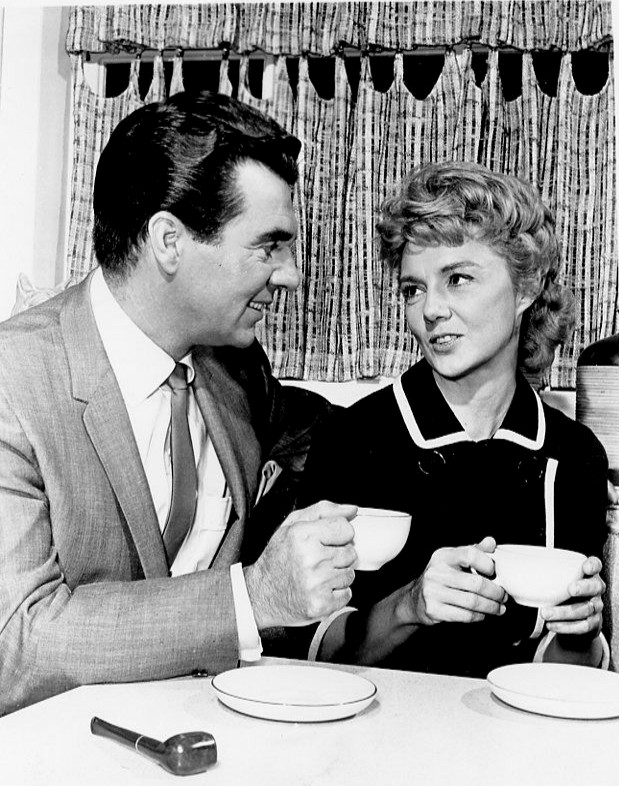
Picerni and Peggy McCay in a scene from the televised daytime soap opera The Young Marrieds (1964)

After Italian organizations began to complain about the use of Italian gangsters on ABC's The Untouchables, starring Robert Stack as G-man Eliot Ness, Picerni joined the cast in 1960 as Ness's number-one aide, Lee Hobson, a role that he played for the duration of the series. (He was also seen in the program's pilot, playing Tony Liguri.) He also portrayed Ed Miller on O'Hara, U.S. Treasury (1971–1972) and was featured as Dan Garrett on The Young Marrieds (1964–66)

=== Guest appearances ===
In 1954, Picerni was cast as the outlaw Rube Burrow in the syndicated western television series Stories of the Century, starring and narrated by Jim Davis. That same year, he had a role in the pilot episode for the 1957-58 NBC detective series, Meet McGraw.

Picerni appeared in two episodes, "Gun Hand" and "Badge to Kill" of the syndicated western series 26 Men (1957–59). He also appeared in the episode "Gypsy Boy" of Tales of the Texas Rangers. In 1957, he played a deserter in an episode of the syndicated Boots and Saddles.

Between 1957 and 1960, Picerni was cast three times in different roles, the last as Duke Blaine, on the ABC/Warner Brothers western series, Colt .45, starring Wayde Preston.

In 1958, Picerni played a milkman on the ABC sitcom, The Donna Reed Show. He also portrayed a police detective in the episode "The Quemoy Story" of Behind Closed Doors.

Picerni made three guest appearances on Perry Mason during its nine-year run on CBS. In 1958 he played Charles Gallagher in "The Case of the One-Eyed Witness", and defendant Army Sgt. Joseph Dexter in "The Case of the Sardonic Sergeant". In 1963, he played murderer Walter Jefferies in "The Case of the Bouncing Boomerang". In 1964, he appeared in The Fugitive, in the episode "Search in a Windy City".

In 1967, Paul appeared with his daughter Gina Picerni in the episode "The Chameleon" of My Three Sons. He also made a featured appearance as a POW who tries to betray the other prisoners by selling damning information to the Nazis, in the "One in Every Crowd" episode of Hogan's Heroes (season 3, episode 10, first broadcast November 11, 1967). He also appeared as "Brown" in the Batman (TV series) episode "Catwoman goes to College"

== Book ==
His autobiography, Steps to Stardom: My Story, written with the help of Tom Weaver, was published by BearManor Media in 2007.

== Personal life and death ==
Picerni married former ballet dancer Marie Mason, in 1947. They settled in Tarzana, California to raise their family; they had eight children and ten grandchildren. Two of Picerni's children predeceased him.

He died from a heart attack in Palmdale, California, on January 12, 2011, at the age of 88. Picerni is interred at the Roman Catholic San Fernando Mission Cemetery.

== Filmography ==
=== Film ===
Year	Title	Role	Notes
1946	In Fast Company	Street Extra	Uncredited
1946	Don't Gamble with Strangers	Gambling Casino Patron	Uncredited
1948	Beyond Glory	Second Detective	Uncredited
1949	Twelve O'Clock High	Bombardier	Uncredited
1949	D.O.A.	Assistant Photographer	Uncredited
1950	When Willie Comes Marching Home	Kerrigan	Scenes deleted
1950	The Secret Fury	Dr. Roth	Uncredited
1950	A Lady Without Passport	Italian	Uncredited
1950	Saddle Tramp	Denver	
1950	I'll Get By	Marine Sergeant	Uncredited
1950	Three Secrets	Sergeant	Uncredited
1950	Dial 1119	Interpreter-Detective	Uncredited
1950	Breakthrough	Private Edward P. Rojeck	
1950	The Killer That Stalked New York	Health Department Investigator	Uncredited
1951	Operation Pacific	Jonesy	
1951	I Was a Communist for the FBI	Joe Cvetic	
1951	Inside the Walls of Folsom Prison	Jeff Riordan	
1951	Fort Worth	Joe Castro	
1951	Force of Arms	Sheridan	
1951	Jim Thorpe – All-American	Man on Speaker's Platform	Uncredited
1951	The Tanks Are Coming	Danny Kolowicz	
1952	Mara Maru	Steven Ranier	
1952	The Miracle of Our Lady of Fatima	'Red' Agitator	Uncredited
1952	Cattle Town	Pepe	
1952	Operation Secret	Captain Armand Dupree	
1953	She's Back on Broadway	Jud Kellogg	
1953	House of Wax	Scott Andrews	
1953	The System	David Wiley	
1953	The Desert Song	Hassan	
1953	The Beast from 20,000 Fathoms	Trailer Commentator	Uncredited
1953	The Charge at Feather River	Sergeant	Scenes deleted
1954	His Majesty O'Keefe	Spanish Ship Owner	Uncredited
1954	Drive a Crooked Road	Carl	
1954	Riding Shotgun	Bob Purdee	Uncredited
1954	Pushover	Masher in Ann's Hallway	Uncredited
1954	The Shanghai Story	Mr. Emilio De Verno	
1954	The Bounty Hunter	Jud	
1954	The Adventures of Hajji Baba	Nurel-Din	
1955	Dial Red O	Norman Roper	
1955	Hell's Island	Eduardo Martin	
1955	Lord of the Jungle	Paul Cabot	
1955	Wiretapper	Herbie	
1955	To Hell and Back	Valentino	
1955	Bobby Ware Is Missing	Alfred Gledhill	
1956	Miracle in the Rain	Priest	
1956	The Come On	Jannings, Assistant District Attorney	
1956	Flight to Hong Kong	Michael Quisto	
1957	The Shadow on the Window	Bigelow	
1957	The Big Caper	Harry	
1957	Operation Mad Ball	Private Bullard	Uncredited
1957	Omar Khayyam	Commander	
1957	The Brothers Rico	Gino Rico	
1958	The Deep Six	Merchant Marine	Uncredited
1958	Return to Warbow	Deputy Sheriff	Uncredited
1958	Marjorie Morningstar	Philip Berman	
1958	The Man Who Died Twice	George	
1958	Torpedo Run	Lieutenant Burt Fisher	
1959	The Young Philadelphians	Louis Donetti	
1960	The Apartment	Patron in bar	
1960	Strangers When We Meet	Arthur Gerandi	
1962	Pages of Death	Lead Cop	Short film
1964	The Age of Violence	Gangster	
1968	The Scalphunters	Frank	
1969	Che!	Hector	
1970	Land Raiders	Carney / Arturo (as H.P. Picerni)	
1970	Airport	Dr. Compagno	
1970	Kelly's Heroes	M.P. Sergeant	Scenes deleted
1971	Kotch	Dr. Ramon Caudillo	
1971	The Fearmaker	Kent Davis	
1978	Capricorn One	Jerry	
1979	Escape to Athena	Zeno's Man	
1979	Beyond the Poseidon Adventure	Kurt	
2007	Three Days to Vegas	Jim	

=== Television ===
Year	Title	Role	Notes
1951	The Living Christ Series	James	Television miniseries
1953–1954	Dragnet	Rios / Hymie	2 episodes
1954	Fireside Theatre	Flores	Episode: "Retribution"
1954	The Public Defender	Albert DeMarco	Episode: "Lost Cause"
1954	The Lone Wolf	Chick Walsi	Episode: "The Italian Story"
1954	Mr. and Mrs. North	Bert Conroy	Episode: "The Girl in Cell 13"
1954	Lux Video Theatre	Dr. Murger	Episode: "Blind Fury"
1954	My Little Margie		Episode: "Vern's Guilty Feeling"
1954	Studio 57	Bill Darrow	Episode: "So False and So Fair"
1954	Climax!		Episode: "Sorry, Wrong Number"
1954–1955	Four Star Playhouse	Laramie Cole / Freddie	2 episodes
1954–1957	Cavalcade of America	Principal John Norton / James Ohio Pattie	2 episodes
1954–1958	The Loretta Young Show	Stanley Reed / Darius / Toby / Laurence Delaney	4 episodes
1955	Big Town		Episode: "The Grand Almost"
1955	Stories of the Century	Rube Burrows - The Alabama Wolf	Episode: "Rube Burrows"
1955	Goodyear Television Playhouse		Episode: "End of the Mission"
1955	Navy Log	Frenchy	Episode: "The Phantom of the Blue Angels"
1955	Waterfront	Chris Pimmentel / Mario Ferrera / Chris Piemental	3 episodes
1955	Passport to Danger	Eddie Matera	Episode: "Naples"
1956	Ford Television Theatre	Detective	Episode: "The Clay Pigeon"
1956	Ford Star Jubilee		Episode: "A Bell for Adano"
1956	The Count of Monte Cristo	Patrini	Episode: "The Sardinian Affair"
1956–1958	The Gale Storm Show	Bengali / Sebastian	2 episodes
1957	Alfred Hitchcock Presents	Assissi #19	Season 2 Episode 21: "Number Twenty Two"
1957	Alfred Hitchcock Presents	Nick Roper	Season 2 Episode 24: "The Cream of the Jest"
1957	Tales of the 77th Bengal Lancers	Jaffar Kul Sidri / Latiff Faroze	2 episodes
1957	Panic!	Marvin Henderson	Episode: "The Airline Hostess"
1957	Circus Boy	Julio Gaetano	Episode: "Little Vagabond"
1957	Broken Arrow	Major Gregory Markson / Zele	2 episodes
1957	The Eve Arden Show	Mr. Turner	Episode: "White Elephant Sale"
1957	The Life of Riley	Ricardo	Episode: "Babs and the Latin"
1957	Tales of the Texas Rangers	Philip Conzog	Episode: "Gypsy Boy"
1957	The Millionaire	Lawrence W. Smart	Episode: "The Story of Steve Logan"
1957	Matinee Theatre		Episode: "A Cloud for Jeni"
1957	Code 3	Fred Davis	Episode: "Sunset Strip"
1957–1958	The Silent Service	Lieutenant John H. Eichman / Lieutenant Commander Thomas Burton Klakring / Executive Officer Alan Bergner / Lieutenant David H. McClintock	4 episodes
1957–1958	Boots and Saddles	Private Grimes / Trooper Grimes	2 episodes
1957–1960	Colt .45	Duke Blaine / Jose / Quito	3 episodes
1958	26 Men	Ranger Ben Thorpe / Ben Thorpe	2 episodes
1958	Zorro	Pedro Murrietta	2 episodes
1958	Maverick	Rene Gireaux	Episode: "Escape to Tampico"
1958	The Donna Reed Show	Milkman	Episode: "The Foundling"
1958	Flight		Episode: "Sky Hook"
1958–1963	Perry Mason	Walter Jefferies / Sergeant Joseph Dexter / Charles Gallagher	3 episodes
1959	The Adventures of Rin Tin Tin	Jaffar Husein	Episode: "Star of India"
1959	Behind Closed Doors	Mike Perrera	Episode: "The Quemoy Story"
1959	Northwest Passage	Guy Perro	Episode: "Stab in the Back"
1959	M Squad	Al Samson	Episode: "The Star Witness"
1959	The Life and Legend of Wyatt Earp	Chief Bullhead	Episode: "Horse Race"
1959	Westinghouse Desilu Playhouse	Tony Liguri / Funzy	3 episodes
1959	Playhouse 90	Lieutenant Alfredo	Episode: "The Killers of Mussolini"
1959–1960	Fury	Tupelo / Bob	2 episodes
1959–1963	The Untouchables	Lee Hobson / Tony Liguri	91 episodes
1960	Hawaiian Eye	Lanakila	Episode: "The Kamehameha Cloak"
1960	Bonanza	Sanchez	Episode: "The Spanish Grant"
1960	The Rebel	Lee Ricker / Manuel Flynn / Clee	3 episodes
1960	Rawhide	Bahari	Episode: "Incident of the Dancing Death"
1960	Sugarfoot	Gian-Paolo Fregoso	Episode: "The Corsican"
1960	Shotgun Slade	Quinn	Episode: "The Fabulous Fiddle"
1960	Bourbon Street Beat	Antonio Rossi	Episode: "Wagon Show"
1960	Markham	Police Captain Mascotti	Episode: "Escorts a La Carte"
1960	Men into Space	Bob King	Episode: "Into the Sun"
1961	Whispering Smith	Enrico Spanato	Episode: "The Interpreter"
1963	77 Sunset Strip	Bruno Cestari	Episode: "5: Part 3"
1964	The Fugitive	Sergeant DeSantis	Episode: "Search in a Windy City"
1964	The Greatest Show on Earth	Marco the Magnificent	Episode: "The Night the Monkey Died"
1964	The Great Adventure	Pierre Lafitte	Episode: "The Pirate and the Patriot"
1964–1966	The Young Marrieds	Dr. Dan Garret	158 episodes
1964–1974	Insight	Tony Guzzo	3 episodes
1965–1967	My Three Sons	Jack / Paul Owlfeather	2 episodes
1966	The Big Valley	Peterson	Episode: "The Iron Box"
1966	Combat!	Private Harold Vincent	Episode: "The Furlough"
1967	Batman	Brown	2 episodes
1967	The Time Tunnel	Mongol Warrior	Episode: "Attack of the Barbarians"
1967	Hogan's Heroes	Jack Williams	Episode: "One in Every Crowd"
1967	The Virginian	Parks	Episode: "The Fortress"
1967–1974	Gunsmoke	The New Marshal / Grimes / Ganns / McGee	4 episodes
1968	Lancer	Provost Marshal	Episode: "The Prodigal"
1968	Hawaii Five-O	Charley Mangan	Episode: "Yesterday Died and Tomorrow Won't Be Born"
1968–1969	Felony Squad	Mark Hewitt / Walt Petrie	2 episodes
1968–1974	The F.B.I.	Dom Giannelli, SAC / Fred Cochella / Joey Walters	3 episodes
1969	Bracken's World	Bob Lederer	Episode: "The Sweet Smell of Failure"
1970	The Name of the Game	Roper	Episode: "So Long, Baby, and Amen"
1970	The Old Man Who Cried Wolf	Detective Green	Television film
1970–1971	Here's Lucy	IRS Agent / Reporter / Frank Williams / Father Lambros	4 episodes
1970–1974	Adam-12	Bill Johnson / Officer Boyd	2 episodes
1970–1975	Mannix	Donegan / Sergeant Les Packer / Detective O'Fallon / Roger Stack / Sheriff	5 episodes
1971	The Immortal	Klabo	Episode: "Sanctuary"
1971	Love, American Style	Alfred	Segment: "Love and Murphy's Bed"
1971	Medical Center	Reinart	Episode: "Danger Point"
1971	The Partners	Carter	Episode: "New Faces"
1971–1972	O'Hara, U.S. Treasury	Bill Clark / Inspector Ed Miller	3 episodes
1972	Room 222	Fred Buchanan	Episode: "Lift, Thrust and Drag"
1973	Emergency!	Ed Duran	Episode: "The Professor"
1973	Circle of Fear	Dr. Richardson	Episode: "Graveyard Shift"
1973	Marcus Welby, M.D.	Dr. Arthur Oliver	Episode: "A Question of Fault"
1974	Banacek	Detective Ed Winslow	Episode: "The Vanishing Chalice"
1974	Big Rose: Double Trouble	Blass	Television film
1974	Run, Joe, Run	Fisherman	Episode: "Bon Voyage"
1974	Ironside	Armand	Episode: "Run Scared"
1974–1978	Kojak	Vic Whitley / Detective Albert Cohen	2 episodes
1975	Kolchak: The Night Stalker	Humane Society Man	Episode: "Primal Scream"
1975	Lucy Gets Lucky	Packy West	Television film
1975	Police Story	Captain Gus Shambray	Episode: "Officer Needs Help"
1975	McCloud	Gregory's Thug	Episode: "Park Avenue Pirates"
1975	McCoy	Glen Phillips	Episode: "Double Take"
1975–1977	Barnaby Jones	Stan Toland / Anthony Calvelli	2 episodes
1976	Special Treat	Dominick	Episode: "Papa and Me"
1976	Alice	Vinny Randazzo	Episode: "The Dilemma"
1976–1977	Starsky & Hutch	Patsy Cairo / Johnny Doors	3 episodes
1977	Something for Joey	Joe Paterno	Television film
1977	The Red Hand Gang	Fred Norris	4 episodes
1977	The Last Hurrah	Dr. Mike Santangelo	Television film
1978	Project U.F.O.	Ed Mason	Episode: "Sighting 4005: The Medicine Bow Incident"
1978	Sam		Episode: #1.4
1978	Sword of Justice	Burcella	Episode: "The Gemini Connection"
1979	Fantasy Island	Nick Largo	Episode: "Photographs/Royal Flush"
1979	Women in White	Technician	Television film
1979	Marciano	John Addelli	Television film
1979	The French Atlantic Affair	Panama Hat	Television miniseries
1979	The Incredible Hulk	Jim	Episode: "Captive Night"
1980	Alcatraz: The Whole Shocking Story	Lieutenant Lagason	Television film
1980	Vegas	Deputy	Episode: "Christmas Story"
1981	Trapper John, M.D.	Dr. DePalma	Episode: "A Family Affair"
1981	Quincy, M.E.	Sloan	Episode: "Memories of Allison"
1981	The Fall Guy	Al Maglia	Episode: "The Rich Get Richer"
1982	Strike Force	Dr. Bernardo	Episode: "The John Killer"
1982	Gavilan	Petros	Episode: "Destination Hero"
1982–1983	T. J. Hooker	Rossi / The Clerk	2 episodes
1983	Capitol	Colonel Amir	
1983–1985	Matt Houston	Dr. Perlin	2 episodes
1986	Sledge Hammer!	Cop Announcer	Episode: "They Shoot Hammers, Don't They?"
1986	Simon & Simon	Maynard Press	Episode: "Like Father, Like Son"
1987	The Dirty Dozen: The Deadly Mission	Ernesto Ferruci	Television film
1998–2000	Diagnosis: Murder	Chris Benway / Judge Kenyon	2 episodes
