= The Brothers Rico =

1957 film by Phil Karlson

- Theatrical release poster
- Directed by: Phil Karlson
- Screenplay by: Lewis Meltzer; Ben Perry
- Story by: Georges Simenon
- Produced by: William Goetz; Lewis J. Rachmil
- Starring: Richard Conte; Dianne Foster; Kathryn Grant
- Cinematography: Burnett Guffey
- Edited by: Charles Nelson
- Music by: George Duning
- Color process: Black and white
- Production company: William Goetz Productions
- Distributed by: Columbia Pictures
- Release date: September 1957
- Running time: 92 minutes
- Country: United States
- Language: English

The Brothers Rico is a 1957 American crime film noir directed by Phil Karlson and starring Richard Conte, Dianne Foster and Kathryn Grant.

== Plot ==
Eddie Rico (Richard Conte) is the happily married owner of a prosperous laundry company in Bayshore, Florida. Later in the film we discover that years ago he had been the accountant for a major crime syndicate. He has given up his ties to the syndicate, and hopes to adopt a child with his wife, Alice (Dianne Foster). When the film opens, Eddie's sleep is interrupted by a call from Phil, a mob operative, who demands Eddie provide employment and a place to lie low for someone who turns out to be a hitman named Wesson (William Phipps). Alice becomes worried that the syndicate will bring Eddie back into a life of crime. Eddie calms her, but then receives a worrisome letter from his mother saying that his two brothers, Johnny (James Darren) and Gino (Paul Picerni), who are both still involved with the mob, have disappeared.

Shortly thereafter, while he is driving, Eddie realizes the vehicle that taps him at a stop light is being driven by his brother, Gino. Off the main street, they both pull over; Gino slides into Eddie's front seat and, in desperation, begs Eddie to help him get out of the country. Gino admits to being the gunman in a gang killing and identifies Johnny as having been his driver. Gino now believes the syndicate is planning to get rid of him; out of the blue they've ordered him to St. Louis. Eddie cannot believe that the syndicate is after him; he has complete faith in the benevolence of Sid Kubik (Larry Gates), the syndicate boss, who Eddie believes thinks of the Ricos as family, just as Eddie thinks of Kubik as a father. Consequently, Eddie tells Gino to go to St. Louis—"Have I ever steered you wrong?"—and gives him some money to do so. When Eddie returns to work, he takes a call from "Uncle" Sid Kubik, who orders him to Miami for a face-to-face conference. Eddie leaves, despite his wife's objections that he will miss an adoption interview.

Eddie meets Kubik in Miami, where Kubik apologizes for the orders given earlier regarding Wesson and congratulates Eddie on his impending adoption. Kubik says the syndicate does not know where Johnny is, but they are concerned. It seems that Johnny's new wife's brother Peter Malaks (Lamont Johnson)—who doesn't at all approve of Johnny or of his having married his sister Norah—has met with prosecutors on a number of occasions. Naturally, the bosses feel that as a result of what Peter tells them, Johnny will be "persuaded" to turn on the syndicate and testify against them in return for clemency. After Eddie insists that he does not believe Johnny would ever rat on them, Kubik tells Eddie that while he believes in Johnny's loyalty, others aren't so sure. In order for Johnny's life to be saved, Kubik says that Eddie must find him and get him to leave the country. After Eddie leaves to do what he has been ordered, Kubik walks down the hall to enter another room where Gino, his face battered from a beating being administered by one of Kubik's henchmen, is seen slumped in a chair with only enough strength to raise his head and say with bitter sarcasm, "Thanks, uncle Sid."

Eddie arrives in New York City and finds Peter Malaks. When Eddie says that Johnny may be in a lot of trouble, Malaks angrily refuses to help find him, calling Johnny a gangster and telling Eddie that maybe Johnny would be better off dead. Eddie then visits his mother (Argentina Brunetti) to ask her where Johnny is, but she proclaims that even though she once took a bullet to protect Kubik's life, she no longer trusts the man, in large part because Gino had told her not to. Indeed, she tells Eddie as he is leaving not to trust anybody. When Eddie tells her that Johnny's life is in danger, she laments, kneeling to pray in front of a statue of the Virgin Mary she has sitting on a shelf, but refuses to tell Eddie anything. Finally, as Eddie is walking out the door, she relents and reveals, with great trepidation, that Johnny last wrote her from El Camino, California.

Eddie has to take two planes to El Camino, where he finds Johnny and his pregnant wife, Norah (Kathryn Grant) hiding out on a friend's farm. Johnny says he's left the syndicate because he wants his son to grow up to be clean and not know a life of crime. Norah, pregnant, is distraught at the prospect of Johnny being dragged back into the syndicate and collapses; she needs a doctor and one is called. Johnny tells Eddie to leave.

Eddie returns to his hotel where Mike Lamotta (Harry Bellaver), a local crime boss, is waiting in Eddie's room. There, Eddie realizes that Kubik has used him to locate Johnny and all along has intended that Johnny be killed. Lamotta orders Eddie to call Johnny and tell him to meet the mobsters waiting outside the house where he's staying. Instead, after Johnny joyously tells Eddie that he's a new father, Eddie urges Johnny to go to the cops; he is immediately knocked out by Lamotta's assistant, Gonzales (Rudy Bond). To save his wife and newborn son, Johnny goes outside, where he is killed.

As Eddie and Gonzales fly back to Florida, Eddie learns that Gino had attempted to flee the country and was also killed. While in a bathroom during their stopover in Phoenix, Eddie knocks Gonzales out. He takes Gonzales' pistol and calls Alice, telling her to leave their house in Florida and meet him in New York at a special place only they know about. Eddie then manages to elude Kubik's minions by hitching a ride to New York in a truck transporting new cars.

He goes to Peter Malaks and informs him that both his brothers have been murdered and that he intends to testify against the syndicate. Malaks, now convinced of Eddie's sincerity, agrees to meet him the next day at a bank where Eddie will give him money to care for his now-widowed sister and her new nephew.

The next day, Eddie goes to the bank (where an informant there recognizes him and rats him out to Kubik via phone), gets a pile of cash from his safe-deposit box, and puts some in three envelopes—one for Malaks, one for Alice so she can get safely out of the country, and one for his mother. He meets Malaks and Alice outside in a cab and gives each their envelopes. He sends the weeping Alice to the airport with Malaks. When Eddie goes to say goodbye to his mother and give her her envelope, Kubik is there and holds him at gunpoint. Eddie pulls out the gun he took from Gonzales in Phoenix and kills both Kubik and his accomplice, but is wounded himself.

In a newspaper headline shot, we discover that Eddie, apparently recovered from his wound, has testified against the syndicate and that it has been successfully prosecuted and destroyed. The final scene shows Eddie driving with Alice up to the children's home where they apparently are meeting with the administrators to finalize the adoption of their new child.

== Cast ==
- Richard Conte as Eddie Rico
- Dianne Foster as Alice Rico
- Kathryn Grant as Norah Malaks Rico
- Larry Gates as Sid Kubik
- James Darren as Johnny Rico
- Argentina Brunetti as Mrs. Rico
- Lamont Johnson as Peter Malaks
- Harry Bellaver as Mike Lamotta
- Paul Picerni as Gino Rico
- Paul Dubov as Phil
- Rudy Bond as Charlie Gonzales
- Richard Bakalyan as Vic Tucci
- William Phipps as Joe Wesson

== Reception ==
=== Critical response ===
The staff at Variety magazine gave the film a positive review and lauded the acting in the drama, writing, "Phil Karlson forges hard action into unfoldment of film. Performances are first-class right down the line, Conte a standout as a man finally disillusioned after thinking of the syndicate leader who orders his brother's execution as a close family friend. Both femmes have comparatively little to do, Dianne Foster as Conte's wife and Kathryn Grant as the brother's, but make their work count. Larry Gates as gang chief scores smoothly and James Darren as younger brother handles character satisfactorily."

== Adaptations ==
The film was later re-made for television in 1972 as The Family Rico.

== See also ==
- List of American films of 1957
