= The Last Hurrah =

1956 book by Edwin O'Connor

- First edition
- Author: Edwin O'Connor
- Language: English
- Publisher: Little, Brown
- Publication date: February 6, 1956
- Publication place: United States
- Media type: Print (Hardcover)
- Pages: 427
- OCLC: 14278867

The Last Hurrah is a 1956 novel written by Edwin O'Connor. It is considered the most popular of O’Connor's works, partly because of a 1958 movie adaptation starring Spencer Tracy. The novel was immediately a bestseller in the United States for 20 weeks, and was also on lists for bestseller of that year. The Last Hurrah won the 1955 Atlantic Prize Novel award, and was highlighted by the Book-of-the-Month Club and Reader's Digest. The Last Hurrah received very positive critical reviews, including an "ecstatic" one from the New York Times Book Review.

== Plot summary ==
The plot of The Last Hurrah focuses on a mayoral election in an unnamed East Coast city. Veteran Irish Democratic Party politician Frank Skeffington is running for yet another term as mayor. As a former governor, he is usually called by the honorific title "Governor." While the city is never named, it is frequently assumed to be Boston. Skeffington is assumed to represent Boston Mayor and Massachusetts Governor James Michael Curley. The story is told in the third person, either by a narrator or by Adam Caulfield, the mayor's nephew. Skeffington is a veteran and adept "machine" politician, and probably corrupt as well. The novel portrays him as a flawed great man with many achievements to his credit.

At the beginning of the book, Skeffington is 72 and has been giving signs that he might consider retiring from public life at the end of his current term. He surprises many by announcing what he had always intended to do: run for another term as mayor. The main body of the novel gives a detailed and insightful view of urban politics, tracking Skeffington and his nephew through rounds of campaign appearances and events, thereby showcasing a dying brand of politics and painting a broad picture of political life in general. His opponent, Kevin McCluskey, is a neophyte candidate with a handsome face and good manners, a good World War II record but no political experience, and no real abilities for politics or governing. However, McCluskey gets support from a new campaign medium: television advertising. Surprisingly, McClusky defeats Skeffington on election day.

One of Adam's friends explains that the election was "a last hurrah" for the kind of old-style machine politics that Skeffington had mastered. Developments in American public life, including the consequences of the New Deal, have so changed the face of city politics that Skeffington no longer can survive in the new age with younger voters. Also, prophetically, for the first time, television ads win the day.

Immediately after his defeat, Skeffington suffers a massive heart attack and another soon afterward. When he dies, he leaves behind a city in mourning for a pivotal figure in its history but no longer with room for either him or his kind.

== Characters ==
- Frank Skeffington is the mayor of an unnamed city as well as that state's former governor. It is commonly accepted that the character of Skeffington is based on James Michael Curley, Mayor of Boston 1914–1918, 1922–1926, 1930–1934 and 1946–1950, and Governor of Massachusetts 1935–1937. At the end of his fourth term as mayor in 1949, Curley, then 74, ran for re-election but was defeated by John Hynes.
- Frank Skeffington, Jr. is the son of the mayor. He is a disappointment to his father because he has no ambition and seems to be interested only in dancing and socializing.
- Adam Caulfield is Frank Skeffington's nephew and a cartoonist for a local newspaper, where he draws a comic strip that he created, "Little Simp". He is 33 years old.
- Maeve Caulfield is married to Adam Caulfield; she is 22. Her views of Frank Skeffington evolve in the course of the book; but they begin as dislike and suspicion of him, due to her upbringing.
- Roger Sugrue, Maeve's father, is a bitter critic of Frank Skeffington. His views have shaped his daughter's views.
- Amos Force is the publisher of the leading newspaper and a member of the city's Protestant old- money elite. For personal, political, and family reasons, as well as anti-Irish bigotry, Force loathes Skeffington and is committed to seeing him lose his latest campaign for Mayor.
- Sam Weinberg, one of Skeffington's inner circle, is Jewish and a shrewd political observer. He is worried about Skeffington's chances for re-election.
- John Gorman, another of Skeffington's advisers, is a senior ward boss and a master politician. He is torn between his faith in Skeffington and his cold-eyed political realism. Gorman is based on James Curley's longtime political ally and rival, Martin Lomasney, of Boston's West End.
- Ditto Boland is an obsequious but not very bright supporter of Skeffington. Like many of Skeffington's acolytes, he does his best to mimic his hero's dress, manner of speaking, and personality. He has so few views of his own that he has won the nickname "Ditto" from Skeffington, a nickname that he accepts with pride because his hero has conferred it. Nobody remembers his real first name any longer, and even he seems not to use it. The character is likely based on John (Up-Up) Kelly, an advance man for Curley who earned his nickname by entering rallies ahead of Curley yelling "Up, up, everybody up for the Governor."
- The Cardinal is a cardinal in the Roman Catholic Church. He and Skeffington grew up together on the same slum street but he has become a bitter opponent of Skeffington, believing that he has disgraced his religion, his fellow Irish, and his office.
- Kevin McCluskey is Skeffington's political opponent, a young and handsome veteran of World War II with virtually no political experience.

== Major themes ==
=== Relation to Curley ===
The similarities between Skeffington and Boston Mayor James Michael Curley are many. Skeffington's age and background, his worship of his dead wife, his layabout son, his antagonistic relations with the members of his city's Protestant upper class, as well as his eventual defeat by a much younger candidate are all features of Curley's life and the conclusion they are one and the same seems obvious. Author Edwin O'Connor, however, always denied this. The city of the novel is never named; but it is certainly implied that it is supposed to represent Boston (O'Connor also lived for a period in Boston).

When a Boston newspaper asked Curley to review the novel he refused and said, "The matter is in the hands of my attorneys." When he saw that the roguish Skeffington charmed readers the former mayor began praising the novel, however, including in person to O'Connor. In a lecture at the University of New Hampshire on the book, Curley treated The Last Hurrah as a de facto biography of himself and discussed things that he believed the novel had unfairly omitted.

=== Changing politics ===
The Last Hurrah tells the story of the end of an era of American politics characterized by the "big-city politician" as exemplified by Frank Skeffington. In the novel, Skeffington lost because of the changing times during which the national government began to aid people in a way that only locals had before. The New Deal and its constituent laws implemented systems whereby the national government would "dispense money, jobs, health care, and housing." Franklin D. Roosevelt, initiator of the New Deal, "[substituted] government social welfare programs for the corrupt ward heeler's ill-gotten private dole and power source." This shift meant a new standard of accountability by which mayoral candidates would be measured.

Some scholars disagree with the above assertions, arguing that several city mayors have benefited from the aid that New Deal agencies gave to their constituents. They may also cite that Roosevelt himself endeavored to strengthen ties to local politics before the Hatch Act stopped him.

Another major theme, perhaps the most important one in hindsight, is the role of outrageous television ads. The McCluskey ad that helps him win shows his family in a provocative pose that "wins the grandmothers." The Last Hurrah was the first major novel to depict the development in political campaigns.

== Influence ==
Along with Democracy (1880), All the King's Men (1946), and Advise and Consent (1959), The Last Hurrah is among the more successful novels about American politics.

The title '"The Last Hurrah" drew on a common phrase in the English lexicon to mean a swan song or, in politics, the last campaign of a politician.

The success of the novel and Tracy's portrayal of the Curley proxy "Skeffington" in the film adaptation as rambunctious but heroic improved the public image the ex-mayor, who was no longer in office by 1956. In addition to giving him new publicity, Curley sued the film's producers and won $46,000. He is now looked upon by some with nostalgia, partly because of the book and the film.

== Adaptations ==
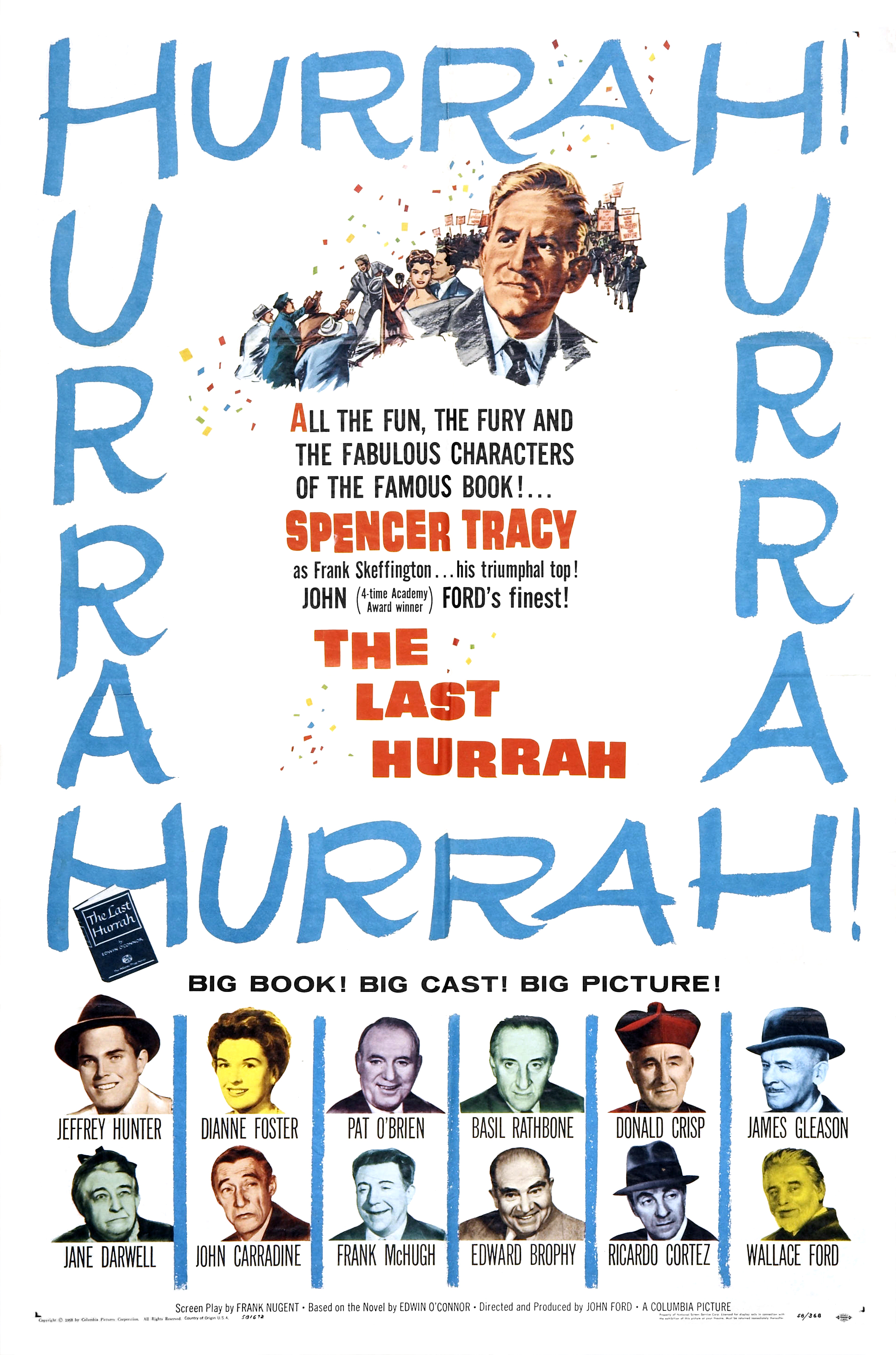
U.S. poster of the 1958 film The Last Hurrah

John Ford directed the adaptation. The cast included many fellow Irish-Americans and members of Ford's informal "stock company", including Spencer Tracy, Pat O'Brien, James Gleason, Frank McHugh, Wallace Ford, and Willis Bouchey. Columbia Pictures bought the rights to make this movie from O'Connor for $150,000.

=== Other ===
In addition to the 1958 movie, there was a made-for-TV 1977 version, starring Carroll O'Connor produced for the Hallmark Hall of Fame series of specials, with Terry Becker as executive producer. There was a 1999 staging for the Huntington Theatre Company in Boston by Eric Simonson. In addition, a two-act musical was written and produced at Northwestern University.
