= The Last Hurrah (1958 film) =

1958 film by John Ford

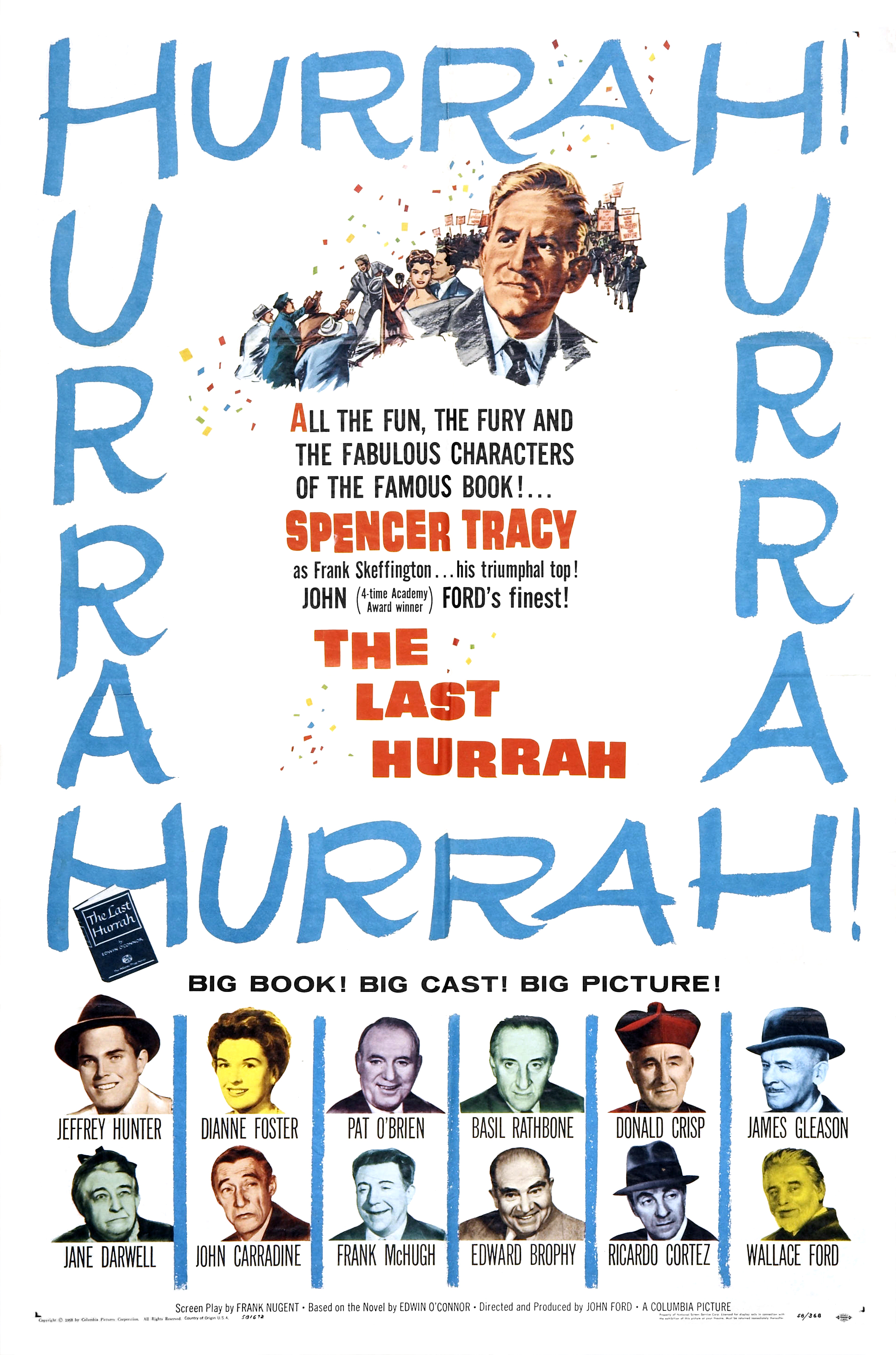
- U.S. movie poster
- Directed by: John Ford
- Written by: Frank S. Nugent
- Based on: The Last Hurrah by Edwin O'Connor
- Produced by: John Ford
- Starring: Spencer Tracy; Jeffrey Hunter; Dianne Foster; Pat O'Brien; Basil Rathbone
- Cinematography: Charles Lawton Jr.
- Edited by: Jack Murray
- Color process: Black and white
- Distributed by: Columbia Pictures
- Release date: November 1958
- Running time: 121 minutes
- Country: United States
- Language: English
- Budget: $2.3 million
- Box office: $1.1 million (est. US/ Canada rentals)

The Last Hurrah is a 1958 American political satire film adaptation of the 1956 novel The Last Hurrah by Edwin O'Connor. It was produced and directed by John Ford and stars Spencer Tracy as a veteran mayor preparing for yet another election campaign. Tracy was nominated as Best Foreign Actor by BAFTA and won the Best Actor Award from the National Board of Review, the latter which also presented Ford their award for Best Director.

The film tells the story of Frank Skeffington, a sentimental but iron-fisted Irish-American who is the powerful mayor of an unnamed New England city. As his nephew, Adam Caulfield, follows one last no-holds-barred mayoral campaign, Skeffington and his top strategist, John Gorman, use whatever means necessary to defeat a candidate backed by civic leaders such as banker Norman Cass and newspaper editor Amos Force, the mayor's dedicated foes.

== Plot ==
The titles roll as an election campaign for a Frank Skeffington unfolds.

In "a New England city", Skeffington, a former governor, is running for a fifth term as mayor. He rose from poverty in an Irish ghetto and is skilled at using the power of his office and an enormous political machine of ward heelers to receive support from his Irish Catholic base and other demographics. Rumors of graft and abuse of power are widespread, however, and the Protestant bishop Gardner, newspaper publisher Amos Force, banker Norman Cass, and other members of the city's traditional elite whom the Irish Catholics replaced oppose Skeffington; so do the Catholic cardinal Martin Burke, Skeffington's childhood friend, and other Catholics. Skeffington's opponents support the candidacy of Kevin McCluskey, a young Catholic lawyer and war veteran with no political experience.

Adam Caulfield is a sportswriter for Force's newspaper, and Skeffington's nephew. His father-in-law, Roger Sugrue, is among those who oppose Skeffington, even though Sugrue grew up in the same tenement as Skeffington and Burke. The mayor invites Caulfield to observe in person what will be his last election, his "last hurrah", to document urban politics before radio and television fully change campaigning. Skeffington prefers old-fashioned, hands-on politics, and attends numerous rallies, luncheons, dinners, and speeches. His influence is such that when Skeffington attends an unpopular old friend's wake, hundreds rush to be present. Disgusted at how the wake becomes another political event, Caulfield leaves; one of the mayor's men explains to him, however, that Skeffington attended to attract mourners to cheer the widow, to whom Skeffington has secretly donated $1,000.

After Cass's bank turns down a loan for the city to build a housing development, Skeffington invades the exclusive Plymouth Club to confront him, Force, the bishop, and other members of the elite. The mayor threatens to publicly embarrass Cass's family by appointing his unintelligent son as fire commissioner. The banker is forced to approve the loan, but vows to contribute large amounts of money to defeat Skeffington. McCluskey's campaign arranges for a series of television advertisements, but his ineptness disappoints both the cardinal and bishop.

On election night Skeffington's men expect another victory, but McCluskey unexpectedly defeats the incumbent and his machine. As his men argue over why their usual tactics involving large amounts of "money" failed, Skeffington chastises them as if he were unaware of their actions. He confidently states on television that he will run for governor, but suffers a heart attack that night, and a large crowd comes to pay respect to the invalid. After Skeffington's last confession, the cardinal, Caulfield, Sugrue, and the mayor's men are at his bedside. When Sugrue suggests that the patient would relive his life differently, Skeffington regains consciousness enough to reply "Like Hell I would" before dying.

== Cast ==
- Spencer Tracy as Mayor Frank Skeffington
- Jeffrey Hunter as Adam Caulfield
- Dianne Foster as Maeve Sugrue Caulfield
- Pat O'Brien as John Gorman
- Basil Rathbone as Norman Cass Sr.
- Donald Crisp as Cardinal Martin Burke
- James Gleason as "Cuke" Gillen
- Edward Brophy as "Ditto" Boland
- John Carradine as Amos Force
- Willis Bouchey as Roger Sugrue
- Basil Ruysdael as Bishop Gardner
- Ricardo Cortez as Sam Weinberg
- Wallace Ford as Charles J. Hennessey
- Frank McHugh as Festus Garvey
- Carleton Young as Winslow
- Frank Albertson as Jack Mangan
- Bob Sweeney as Johnny Degnan
- Edmund Lowe as Johnny Byrne
- William Leslie as Dan Herlihy
- Anna Lee as Gert Minihan
- Ken Curtis as Monsignor Killian
- Jane Darwell as Delia Boylan
- O.Z. Whitehead as Norman Cass Jr.
- Arthur Walsh as Frank Skeffington Jr.
- Charles B. Fitzsimons as Kevin McCluskey
- William Forrest as Dr. Tom
- James Dime as Man at Campaign HQ.

== Production ==
The role of Mayor Frank Skeffington was first offered to Orson Welles, as Welles recounts in Peter Bogdanovich's 1992 book This Is Orson Welles:

When the contracts were to be settled, I was away on location, and some lawyer—if you can conceive of such a thing—turned it down. He told Ford that the money wasn't right or the billing wasn't good enough, something idiotic like that, and when I came back to town the part had gone to Tracy.

Like the novel, the film was based in part on the career of former Boston mayor James Michael Curley, and the unnamed New England city that he runs was based on Boston, Massachusetts. Curley opposed the film's production, but not because of the negative dramatization; rather, he believed that The Last Hurrah might prevent Hollywood from making a biographical film of his life. Columbia paid Curley $25,000 in exchange for signing away any future legal action.

It was Jeffrey Hunter's first film after taking off a year due to illness.

The movie was budgeted at $2.5 million but came in at $200,000 under budget. For The Last Hurrah a large, expensive New England exterior set was constructed around an existing park at Columbia Ranch in Burbank, CA. Most of this 'Boston Row homes' set burned down in 1974, but the 'Skeffington Mansion' stood until October 2023, when it was demolished, along with the rest of the famous Backlot, at what was then known as the Warner Bros Ranch Facilities. One can see the structure in many films and TV shows filmed at the Ranch, such as The Middle and Young Sheldon.

== Reception ==
The film received generally positive reviews from critics. Bosley Crowther of The New York Times called it "robustly amusing and deeply touching. And Mr. Tracy is at his best in the leading role." Variety wrote, "The two-hour running length is somewhat overboard but Tracy's characterization of the resourceful, old-line politician-mayor has such consummate depth that it sustains the interest practically all the way. A little editing might have helped but the canvas is rich and the political machinations replete." Harrison's Reports called the film "a vastly entertaining study of a resourceful old-time politician, wonderfully portrayed by Spencer Tracy, who makes the character warmly human, sympathetic, witty and charming even though he is not above resorting to trickery and malice to combat political enemies."

John McCarten of The New Yorker wrote "There are some sprightly moments in this film...but as a really sound representation of political shenanigans it is a long way from home. (While Skeffington was going about spreading sweetness and light, I kept thinking nostalgically about the film called The Great McGinty; now there was an elucidation of American politics." Richard L. Coe of The Washington Post praised Spencer Tracy's performance as "deep and alert" but still found the film disappointing, writing that it "isn't exactly bad, but it's nowhere near the movie Edwin O'Connor's hard, rollicking political novel should have made...Very rarely does Hollywood risk meeting politics head-on and this shows clearly in Frank Nugent's fairly empty, very sentimental screen treatment of O'Connor's vigorous book."

A positive review in the British Monthly Film Bulletin commented that it was "directed with humour, feeling (notably in the relationships between Skeffington and his supporters, the clownish Ditto and the shrewd ward politicians) and a superlative sense of the big occasion. The election scene, moving from bustling confidence to cold defeat, is masterly; the death-bed scene is a triumphant piece of old-style sentiment. Tracy's Skeffington suggests the real power that lies beneath the Irish charm and effrontery."

The movie was not a box-office success and recorded a loss of $1.8 million. Tracy was nominated for an Academy Award for Best Actor for his work in The Old Man and the Sea released earlier that year, but believed his performance in The Last Hurrah was superior. Ronald Bergan believed that the movie was perhaps Ford's "most personal" film among his later works. He stated that Tracy's portrayal of Skeffington was a surrogate for Ford and that the film was "full of Fordian moments."

== See also ==
- List of American films of 1958
