= Edwin O'Connor =

American journalist and novelist

- Born: Edwin Greene O'Connor; July 29, 1918; Providence, Rhode Island
- Died: March 23, 1968 (aged 49); Boston, Massachusetts
- Education: University of Notre Dame (BA)
- Occupations: Novelist; radio personality; journalist
- Spouse: Veniette Caswell Weil

Edwin Greene O'Connor (July 29, 1918 – March 23, 1968) was an American journalist, novelist, and radio commentator. He won the Pulitzer Prize for Fiction in 1962 for his novel The Edge of Sadness (1961). His ancestry was Irish, and his novels concerned the Irish-American experience and often dealt with the lives of politicians and priests.

== Early life ==
O'Connor was born to a medical doctor in Providence, Rhode Island, but was raised in Woonsocket, Rhode Island. He was an alumnus of La Salle Academy and the University of Notre Dame. After graduation, he served in the United States Coast Guard during World War II. In 1946 he began working as a freelance author, selling his stories and reports to numerous magazines, including Atlantic Monthly.

== Writing career ==
During the 1950s O'Connor began a career as a television critic for two Boston newspapers, a profession he would follow for the remainder of his life. He also published his first novel, The Oracle (1951).

Soon afterward, he published the novel for which he is most remembered, The Last Hurrah (1956). The novel concerns a Boston Irish politician, Frank Skeffington, as related by a nephew whom he invites to accompany him on what is an eventually unsuccessful reelection campaign. Skeffington has a gentlemanly manner, lacing his talk with literary quotations. He is slightly corrupt but delivers service to his constituents. He is an expert at balancing the claims of the various Boston-area ethnic groups. However, his time has passed, and he loses the election. While it is not a roman à clef, there is some similarity between the novel's Skeffington and the real life Boston Mayor James Michael Curley. The novel was adapted for film in 1958, with John Ford directing a screenplay by Frank S. Nugent. Starring Spencer Tracy, Jeffrey Hunter, and Donald Crisp, the film was not a commercial success. However, as Charles Fanning notes, "The windfall profits from The Last Hurrah made O'Connor for the first time financially secure."

O'Connor won the annual Pulitzer Prize for Fiction in 1962 for his next novel, The Edge of Sadness (Little, Brown, 1961). It is the story of a middle-aged priest in an unnamed New England city with a cathedral that is probably modeled on Providence, his birthplace.

I Was Dancing (1964) is a novel about an aging vaudevillian who tries to become reacquainted with his son after twenty years of casual neglect.

His last novel, All in the Family, appeared in 1966. (It has no relation at all to the later television series of the same name.) It is a story of a Massachusetts family with a father who has political ambitions for his sons. As with The Last Hurrah, it is not a roman à clef but the clan is certainly reminiscent of the Kennedy family. "Edwin O'Connor, the author of The Last Hurrah, summed up the era in his final novel, All in the Family: 'Corruption here had a shoddy, penny-ante quality it did not have in other states....Here everything was up for grabs and nothing was too small to steal....In our politics there seemed to be a depthless cushion of street-corner cynicism, a special kind of tainted, small-time fellowship which sent out a complex of vines and shoots so interconnected that even the sleaziest poolroom bookie managed, in some way, however obscure, to be in touch with the mayor's office or the governor's chair.'"

O'Connor died suddenly of a cerebral hemorrhage in 1968.

== Legacy ==
Published posthumously in 1970 was The Best and the Last of Edwin O'Connor, which included excerpts from his published novels, fragments of unpublished works, articles written by him, and a lecture transcript. The book's introduction was written by Arthur Schlesinger, Jr.

He is remembered for coining the phrase "the last hurrah". The Omni Hotel in Boston, Massachusetts features a bar named "The Last Hurrah".

== Books ==
- The Oracle (Harper, 1951)
- The Last Hurrah (Little, Brown, 1956)
- Benjy: A Ferocious Fairy Tale (Little, Brown, 1957), illustrated by Ati Forberg
- The Edge of Sadness (Little, Brown, 1961)
- I Was Dancing (Little, Brown, 1964)
- All in the Family (Little, Brown, 1966; Cluny Media, 2019)
- The Best and the Last of Edwin O'Connor (Little, Brown, 1970) — selections and fragments with contributions by Arthur Schlesinger, Jr.; Edmund Wilson; John V. Kelleher
- Benjy: A Ferocious Fairy Tale (Godine, 1994), illus. Catharine O'Neill
