= Hovsepian =

Hovsepian (Armenian: Հովսեփյան) is an Armenian family name derived from Hovsep (Armenian for Joseph). Variants of Hovsepian include Hovsepyan, Ovsepyan, Osipian, Housepian, Hosepian, and Hovsapian Notable people with the surname include:

- Aghvan Hovsepyan (born 1953), Armenian jurist and politician
- Albert Ovsepyan (born 1938), Armenian-Abkhazian politician
- Ani Hovsepyan (born 1998), Armenian boxer
- Araik Ovsepyan (born 1995), Russian football player
- Aramais Vardani Hovsepian (1921–1980), Iranian actor and film director
- Bersabe Hovsepyan-Snhchyan, Iranian–Armenian educator and school founder
- Cameron Hovsepian, singer
- Edgar Housepian (1928–2014), American neurosurgeon and professor
- Haik Hovsepian Mehr (1945–1994), Iranian Christian activist and bishop
- Hayk Ovsepyan (1891–1937), Soviet military leader and politician
- Jacob Petros II Hovsepian, Armenian priest
- Karekin I Hovsepian (1867–1952), Armenian art scholar
- Lia Osipian (born 1930), Armenian biologist, plant physiologist and mycologist
- Marjorie Housepian Dobkin (1922–2013), Armenian-American author and professor
- Moses M. Housepian (1876–1952), Armenian-American physician and medical relief worker
- Ronald Hovsepian (born 1961), American businessman
- Ruben Hovsepyan (1939–2016), Armenian writer and politician
- Rumyan Hovsepyan (born 1991), Armenian football player
- Sargis Hovsepyan (born 1972), Armenian football player
- Sheree Hovsepian, Iranian-born American artist
- Vanig Rupen Hovsepian (1918–2002), Armenian-American composer and jazz musician better known by his pseudonym, Turk Van Lake
- Vatche Hovsepyan (sometimes Hovsepian; 1925–1978), Armenian musician and duduk player
