= Hovsep =

Hovsep (Armenian: Հովսեփ (reformed); Յովսէփ (classical)) is Armenian for Joseph. Notable people with the name include:

- Hovsep Arghutian (1863–1925), Armenian military commander and political activist
- Hovsep Arghutian (1743–1801), Armenian archbishop
- Hovsep Aznavur (1854–1935), Ottoman Armenian architect
- Hovsep Emin (1726–1809), Indo–Armenian traveler, writer and political activist
- Hovsep Hovsepian (1884–1937), Armenian American actor
- Hovsep Kirakosyan (1988–2016), Armenian army officer
- Hovsep Orbeli (1887–1961), Soviet Armenian orientalist and academician
- Hovsep Pushman (1877–1966), American artist of Armenian origin
- Hovsep Vartanian (1813–1879), Ottoman Armenian statesman, writer and journalist

== See also ==
- Hovsepian, surname derived from the name
