= Kirakosyan =

Kirakosyan (Armenian: Կիրակոսյան) or in Western Armenian pronunciation Giragosian and francicized Guiragossian is an Armenian surname derived from the given name Kirakos. It may refer to:

== Kirakosyan ==
- Barsegh Kirakosyan (born 1982), Armenian football defender
- David Kirakosyan (born 2006), Russian-Armenian football player
- Hovsep Kirakosyan (1988–2016), Armenian military officer
- John Kirakosyan (1929–1985), Armenian historian and political scientist
- Levan Kirakosyan (born 1973), Armenian boxer
- Vrezh Kirakosyan (born in 1983), Armenian singer

== Kirakossian ==
- Arman Kirakossian (1956–2019), Armenian diplomat and historian
- Armen Kirakossian (1960–2025), Armenian politician

== Giragosian ==
- Richard Giragosian (born 1965), Armenian American academic and political scientist

== Guiragossian ==
- Abraham Guiragossian, Lebanese Armenian photographer, continued the Maison Bonfils business after 1918
- Paul Guiragossian (1926–1993), Lebanese Armenian painter

== See also ==
- Kirakos / Giragos, disambiguation
