= A Houseful of Love =

1957 novel by Marjorie Housepian Dobkin

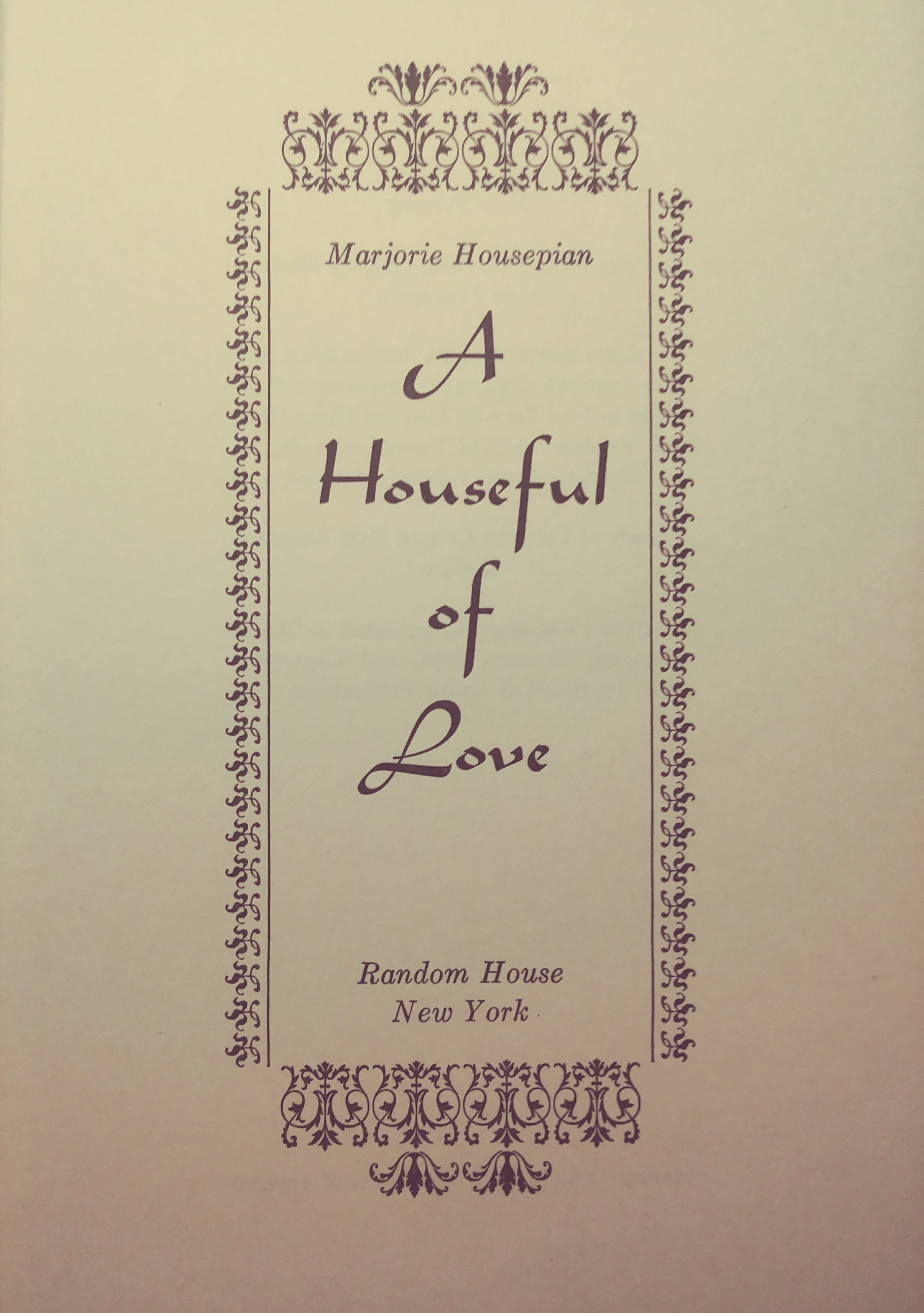
- Author: Marjorie Housepian Dobkin
- Language: English
- Publisher: Random House
- Publication date: 1957
- OCLC: 5940055
- LC Class: PZ4.D634 Ho

A Houseful of Love is a novel by Marjorie Housepian Dobkin, published in 1957 by Random House, that tells the story of an extended family of Armenian-Americans in 1929. It was a New York Times and New York Herald Tribune bestseller and was translated into several languages.

The unnamed narrator (like the author) was born in New York City as the daughter of Armenian refugees from Ottoman persecution, and like the author's father (Moses Housepian), the narrator's father was the primary physician to the Armenian community in New York at the time.

The family's story in New York in 1929 is told in parallel with that in the Ottoman Empire a generation earlier as well as with that of a cousin called Levon Dai. Although Levon Dai himself is absent from the direct action of the novel, family members often tell each other episodes from his life: how he fled Ottoman Turkey (whose government had assassinated his father), arrived in the US in 1919, and settled soon after in Council Bluffs, Iowa, where he became a wealthy businessman; however, his relatives still pity him because he lives in a place where he is the only Armenian.

== International and Reader's Digest editions ==
A British edition was published by Victor Gollancz Ltd, and the book was translated into German (in an Austrian edition) as Ein Haus voll Liebe and into Norwegian as Et hus fullt av kjærlighet. Reader's Digest Condensed Books published abridged versions in English, Italian, German, and Japanese.
