= Kirakos =

Kirakos (Armenian: Կիրակոս), also spelled Giragos or Guiragos in Western Armenian, is an Armenian given name derived from the Greek Cyriacus. It may refer to:

== Kirakos ==
- Kirakos Gandzaketsi (c. 1200/1202–1271), Armenian historian of the 13th century and author of the History of Armenia
- Kirakos (Giragos) I Virapetsi of Armenia, Catholicos of the Armenian Apostolic Church (1441–1443) residing as first Catholicos of the Mother See of Holy Echmiadzin and All Armenians. See list
- Kirakos I of Cilicia, Catholicos of the Holy See of Cilicia (1797–1822). See list
- Kirakos II of Cilicia, Catholicos of the Holy See of Cilicia (1855–1866) See list

== Giragos ==
- Giragos (coadjutor) to Armenian Patriarch of Jerusalem Krikor III (13th century). See list
- Giragos I of Constantinople, Armenian Patriarch of Constantinople (1641–1642). See list
- Giragos I of Jerusalem, Armenian Patriarch of Jerusalem (1846–1850). See list

== Guiragos ==
- Guiragos, Lebanese football player of Armenian origin

== See also ==
- St. Giragos Armenian Church, an Armenian Apostolic church in Diyarbakır, Turkey
- Kirakosik, literally small Kirakos, an earlier name of Ashotavan, a village in the Sisian Municipality of the Syunik Province in Armenia.
- Kirakosyan, disambiguation
- Cyriacus, disambiguation
