= Fund for Armenian Relief =

The Fund for Armenian Relief (FAR) is a humanitarian organization in the United States. It provides short-term emergency relief and long-term programs focusing on child protection, economic development, education, health care, and social services.

FAR was founded in response to the 1988 Armenian earthquake by neurosurgeon Edgar Housepian, Archbishop Torkom Manoogian, and businessman Kevork Hovnanian. Headquartered in New York City, it also has offices in Armenia and had offices in the Nagorno-Karabakh Republic. It has more than 180 employees. Its diverse programs include a Homeless Children's Center, an Information Technology Center, educational scholarship programs, a Medical Education Program, soup kitchens, and senior centers.
