= Maison Bonfils =

French photography business (1867–1918)

Maison Bonfils was a French family-run company producing and selling photography and photographic products from Beirut (then in Ottoman Syria, now in Lebanon) from 1867 until 1918, from 1878 on renamed "F. Bonfils et Cie". The Bonfils ran the first and, in their time, most successful photographic studio in the city. Maison Bonfils produced studio portraits, staged biblical scenes, landscapes, and panoramic photographs.

== Studio history ==
=== Félix and Lydie Bonfils ===
Félix Bonfils, a French photographer, married Marie-Lydie Cabanis in 1857. The couple, together with their son Adrien, moved to Beirut in 1867 where they opened a photographic studio called "Maison Bonfils", on what later became rue Georges-Picot. Maison Bonfils produced thousands of photographs of the Middle East. Bonfils worked with both his wife and his son. They photographed landscapes, portraits, posed scenes with subjects dressed up in Middle Eastern regalia, and also stories from the Bible.

Félix Bonfils took photographs in Ottoman Syria (in today's Lebanon, Israel & Palestine, Syria), the Khedivate of Egypt, Greece and Constantinople (now Istanbul), producing the vast majority of his work, while his wife and son were also involved in photography produced by the studio. As few are signed, it is difficult to identify who is responsible for individual photographs. Lydie is thought to have taken some of the studio portraits, especially those of Middle Eastern women, who were more inclined to pose for a female photographer. In 1876, Félix returned to Alès to have compiled collections of their photographs published.

In 1878, when the name of the studio was changed to "F. Bonfils et Cie", Adrien was back in Beirut after completing his studies in France and took more responsibility for photography, including landscape. Félix again travelled to Alès to establish a collotype printing factory in 1880, and died there in 1885.

=== Lydie & Adrien Bonfils ===
Adrien remained at the studio until the early 1900s, when he left to open a hotel in Brummana. With the assistance of fellow photographer Abraham Guiragossian, Lydie continued to manage the studio after the departure of Adrien. In 1907, she published a collection of photographs in the "Catalogue général des vues photographiques de l’Orient".

Maison Bonfils was one of the most prolific studios in the Middle East in the late 19th century. After Félix's death, the studio continued to produce photographs by the Bonfils family, first under Adrien's management, then Lydie's, until her death in 1918. Lydie expanded the business, opening studios in Cairo and Alexandria, with connections to a New York agency. The Bonfils also employed an unknown number of assistants. When the Ottoman Empire entered the First World War on the side of the Central Powers, Lydie was evacuated with her family to Cairo, where she later died.

=== A. Guiragossian ===
After Lydie Bonfils's death, Guiragossian purchased the company and its archives, henceforth signing his photographs "Lydie Bonfils photographe, Beyrouth (Syrie) successeur A. Guiragossian."

Guiragossian had arrived in Beirut in 1888 and studied there under the photographer Garabed Krikorian. He had become, according to some researchers, a co-owner of the studio and one of its main photographers since 1909. As single owner, starting from 1918, he continued to work both as a photographer, and as a publisher of albums and postcards using the classical old Bonfils images. He ran the business at least until the end of 1932, perhaps even until 1938, which places the Bonfils-Guiragossian photographic company among the longest surviving ones in the area of the former Ottoman Empire.

== Felix Bonfils ==
Félix Bonfils
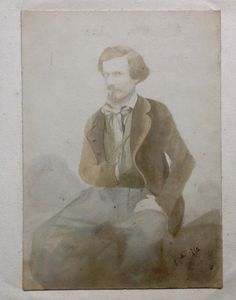
- Bonfils, self-portrait
- Born: Félix Adrien Bonfils; 8 March 1831; Saint-Hippolyte-du-Fort, France
- Died: 9 April 1885 (aged 54); Alès, France
- Occupations: Photographer and publisher
- Years active: 1867–
- Known for: early Middle East photography
- Spouse: Marie-Lydie Cabanis (m. 1857)

Félix Adrien Bonfils (8 March 1831 – 1885) was a French photographer and writer who was active in the Middle East. He was one of the first commercial photographers to produce images of the Middle East on a large scale and amongst the first to employ a new method of colour photography, developed in 1880.

=== Life and career ===
Bonfils was born in Saint-Hippolyte-du-Fort and died in Alès. As a young man he worked as a bookbinder. In 1860, he joined General d'Hautpoul's expedition to the Levant, organised by France following the massacre of Christians in the civil conflict between Christians and Druze in Mount Lebanon and Damascus. On his return to France, it is thought that Bonfils was taught the heliogravure printing process by Abel Niépce de Saint-Victor and opened a printing office in Alès in 1864. Soon after returning from Lebanon, he became a photographer.

In 1857, he married Marie-Lydie Cabanis. When his son, Adrien, fell ill, Bonfils remembered the green hills around Beirut and sent him there to recover, accompanied by his mother. The family moved to Beirut in 1867 where they opened a photographic studio called "Maison Bonfils".

Maison Bonfils produced thousands of photographs of the Middle East. Bonfils worked with both his wife and his son. Their studio became "F. Bonfils et Cie" in 1878. They photographed landscapes, portraits, posed scenes with subjects dressed up in Middle Eastern regalia, and also stories from the Bible. Bonfils took photographs in Lebanon, Egypt, Palestine, Syria, Greece, Cyprus and Constantinople (now Istanbul). While Bonfils produced the vast majority of his work, his wife, Lydie, and son Adrien were also involved in photography produced by the studio. As few are signed, it is difficult to identify who is responsible for individual photographs. Lydie is thought to have taken some of the studio portraits, especially those of Middle Eastern women, who were more inclined to pose for a female photographer. Adrien became more involved in the landscape photography at age 17, when Félix returned to Alès to have compiled collections of their photographs published and then to open a collotype printing factory. Félix died in Alès on 9 April 1885.

Bonfils was amongst the first photographers to employ the new technique of Photochrom, a photographic colour printing technique, developed in 1880. Maison Bonfils was one of the most prolific studios in the Middle East in the late 19th-century. After Félix's death, the studio continued to produce photographs by the Bonfils family, first under Adrien's management, then Lydie's, until her death in 1918.

=== Work ===
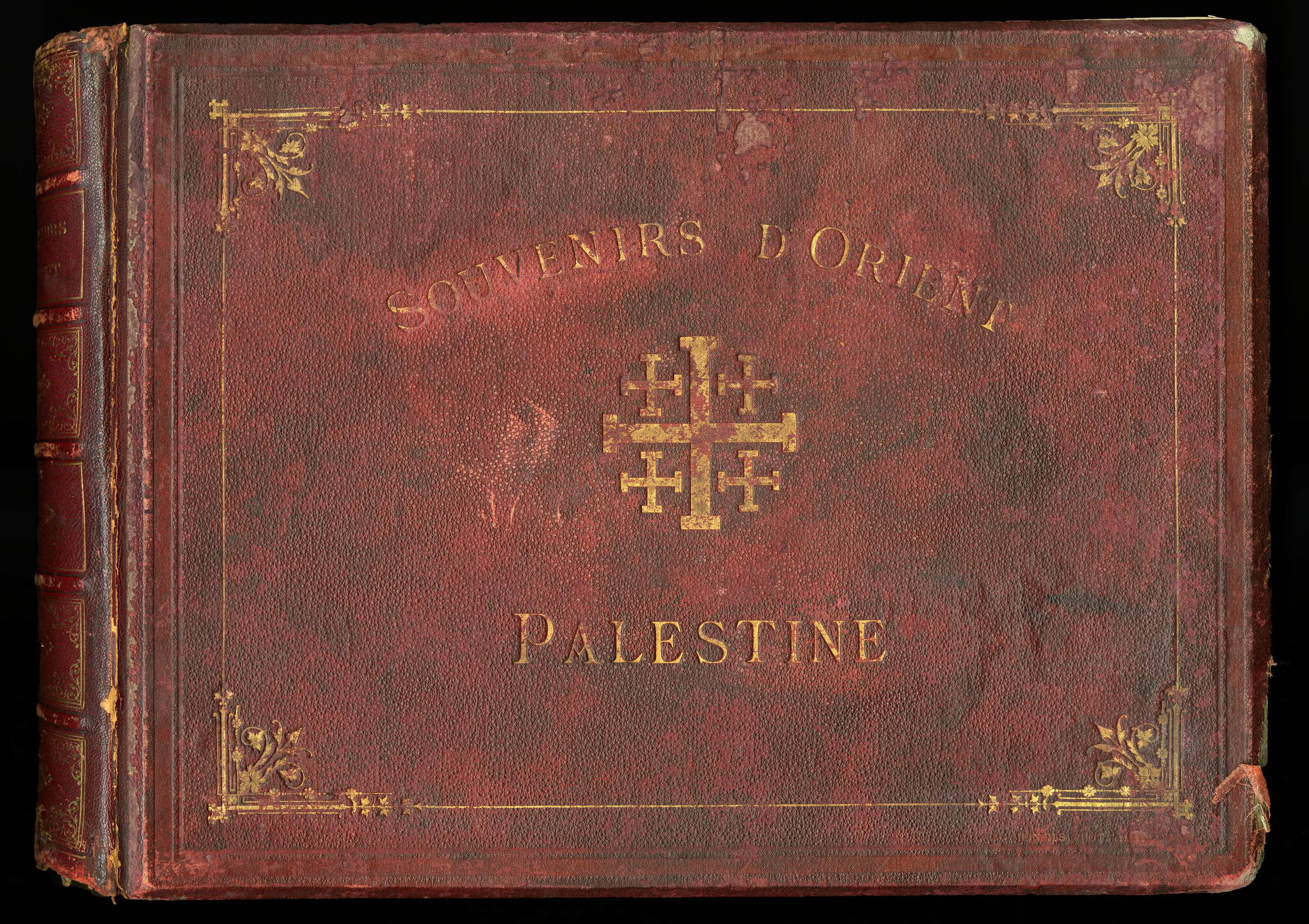
Cover of Souvenirs d'Orient, 1878 by Félix Bonfils

After settling in the Near East, Félix Bonfils took some panoramic photographs of Constantinople and Damascus. His work became well known among tourists that travelled to those countries because they bought photographs as souvenirs. In 1872 he published the album Architecture antique (by Ducher press) after presenting some of his pictures to the Société française de photographie. He later re-opened a studio in Alès (France) from which he would publish Souvenirs d'Orient; his best-known work.

== Marie-Lydie Cabanis Bonfils ==
Marie-Lydie Cabanis Bonfils
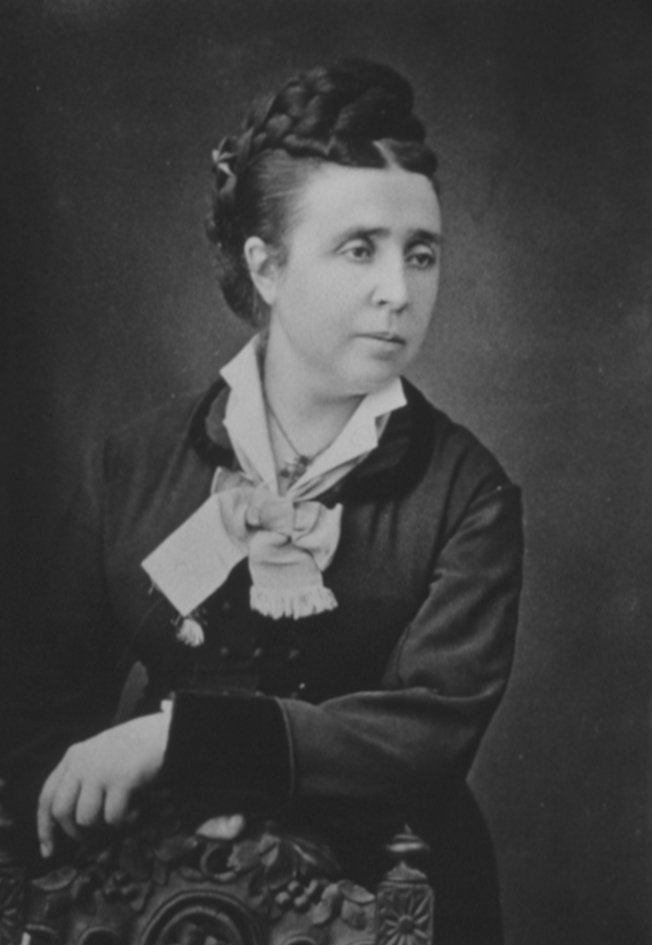
- Born: 21 March 1837; Congénies, France
- Died: 1918 (aged 80–81)
- Other names: Lydie Bonfils, Lydia Bonfils
- Occupations: Photographer and publisher
- Known for: early Middle East photography
- Spouse: Félix Adrien Bonfils (m. 1857; died 1885)
- Children: 2

Marie-Lydie Bonfils, née Cabanis, (1837–1918) was the first professional woman photographer in the Middle East. Originally from France, she was active in Lebanon and neighbouring areas of the Ottoman Empire in the late 19th and the early 20th centuries. Lydie and her husband, Félix Bonfils, established "Maison Bonfils", the first and, at the time, most successful photographic studio in Beirut.

=== Early and family life ===
Lydie married Félix Bonfils on 27 August 1857 in Crespian. Their children, Félicité-Sophie and Paul Félix Adrien (known as Adrien), were born in 1858 and 1861 respectively in Saint-Hippolyte-du-Fort. Félix was originally a bookbinder but, when France intervened in the 1860 civil war between Christians and Druze in the Middle East, he was a part of the military expedition. Lydie was enamoured by the tales of Lebanon Félix told on his return.

When Adrien became dangerously ill with whooping cough, it was thought that a change in climate would cause him to improve. So, it was decided that Lydie would take Adrien to Beirut to recover, due to Félix's fond memories of Lebanon and Lydie's desire to see the area. The trip was a great success and, in 1867, the whole family moved from France to Beirut.

=== Career ===
Once in Beirut, the Bonfils opened a photographic studio, "Maison Bonfils", located on the rue George Picot. Maison Bonfils produced studio portraits, staged biblical scenes, landscapes, and panoramic photographs.

Lydie was heavily involved in administrative duties, which expanded when the business opened studios in Cairo and Alexandria, with connections to a New York agency. She was also involved in preparing the albumen for prints. This involved separating the egg white from the yolk, which could be a lengthy and unpleasant process. According to Adrien's son, Roger Bonfils, when she was boarding the evacuation ship to leave Beirut in 1916, Lydie exclaimed, "I don't want to smell another egg again!".

Although the early photographs from Maison Bonfils have been generally attributed to Félix alone, the involvement of Lydie and Adrien in the photography side of the business is now recognised. They also had an unidentified number of assistants. Photographers in the area found it difficult to find people willing to be photographed, partly due to local religious and cultural concerns about photography, and this applied particularly to women. As a woman, Lydie is said to have been a more acceptable photographer for Middle Eastern women. As the region was thought to be too dangerous for Lydie to take photographs outside of the studio, her work was likely limited to studio portraits. However, there is may be evidence that she was responsible for some landscape photographs, as English clergyman Samuel Manning cites "Madame Bonfils of Beyrout" as a photographic source for the illustrations of Palestine in his 1874 book.

Lydie ran the studio in Félix's absence when he returned to Alès in 1876 to publish compilations of his photographs. In 1878, the name of the studio was changed to "F. Bonfils et Cie". Adrien, now back in Beirut after completing his studies in France, took more responsibility for photography during this time. Félix again travelled to Alès to establish a collotype printing factory in 1880 and died there in 1885.

Adrien remained at the studio until the early 1900s, when he left to open a hotel in Brummana. With the assistance of fellow photographer Abraham Guiragossian, Lydie continued to manage the studio after the departure of Adrien. In 1907, Lydie published a collection of photographs from the studio in the Catalogue général des vues photographiques de l’Orient.

Lydie's career was halted by the Ottoman Empire entering the First World War. She was evacuated with her family to Cairo, where she died and was buried in 1918. After Lydie's death, Guiragossian purchased Maison Bonfils and the Bonfils' archives. Lydie's connection to the studio remained, however, as he signed his photographs, "Lydie Bonfils photographe, Beyrouth (Syrie) successeur A. Guiragossian."

== Select list of publications ==
- Bonfils, F., Architecture antique : Égypte, Grèce, Asie Mineure, 1872
- Bonfils, F., Catalogue de vues photographiques de l'Orient, 1876
- Bonfils, F., Souvenirs d'Orient, 1878
- Bonfils, F. (with Adrien & Lydie Bonfils), Photographs of the Middle East, circa 1860s–1900s

=== L’Orient des Bonfils (1867–1918) ===
On 11 May 2017, the heirs of the Bonfils-Saalmüller family donated a number of archives with historical photographs by Félix, Marie-Lydie and Adrien Bonfils to the library of Egyptology at the Collège de France in Paris. These photographs and accompanying art historical text were published in 2022 as L’Orient des Bonfils (1867–1918). Les archives Bonfils de la bibliothèque d’égyptologie du Collège de France. In addition to the commercial print version of 865 pages with 461 black-and-white or colorized photographs, this book was also made available for free download as a contribution to Digital Humanities and for wide consultation on the Internet.

== Digitisation and online access ==
In 2013, the Bonfils' archive has been digitised in a project between the British Library's Endangered Archives Programme and the Jafet Memorial Library of the American University of Beirut. The collection is available online at the Endangered Archives Programme website.

More digitised images are available online in connection with the L’Orient des Bonfils (1867–1918) book project.

== Selected photographs from Maison Bonfils ==
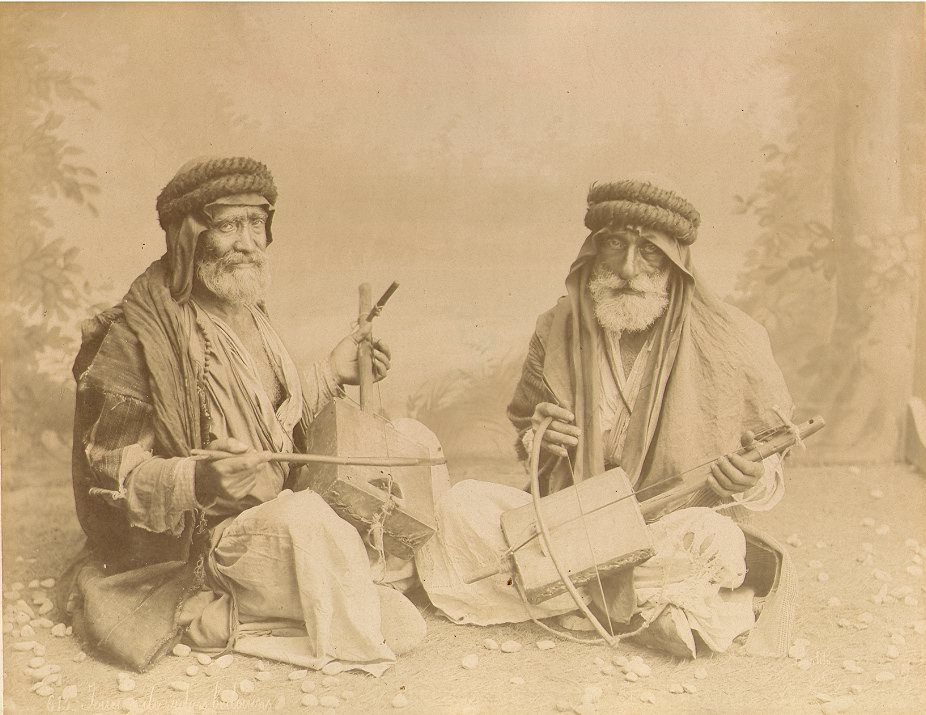
Bedouin violin players, c. 1880

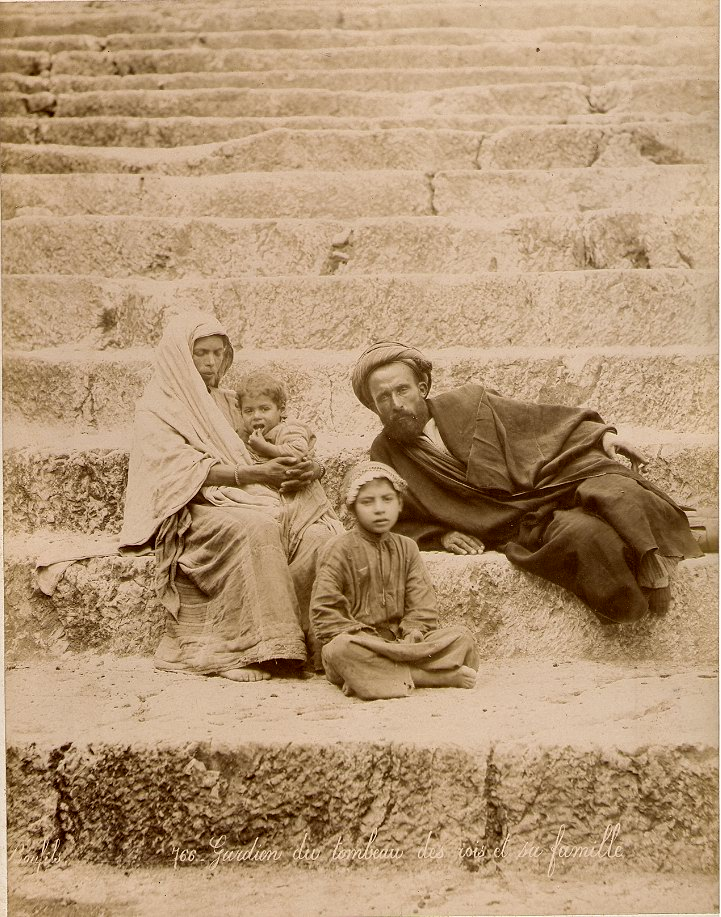
Guardian of the Tomb and his family, c.1880

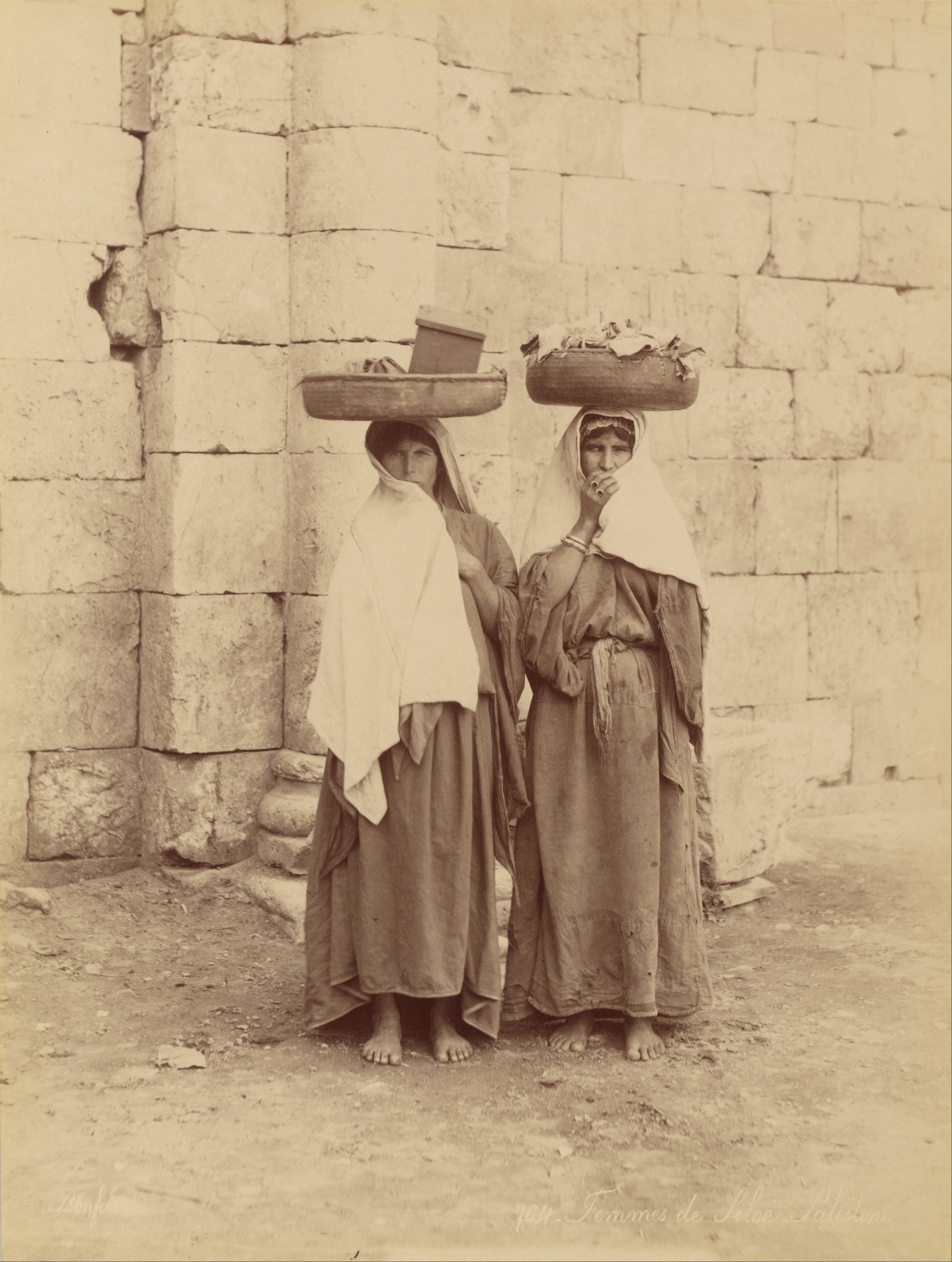
Women of Siloé, Palestine, c. 1880

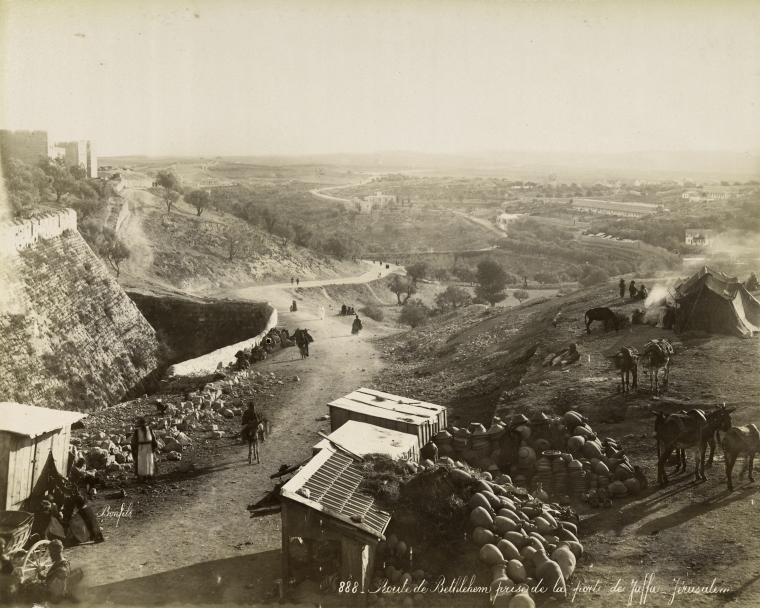
Road to Bethlehem, c. 1880

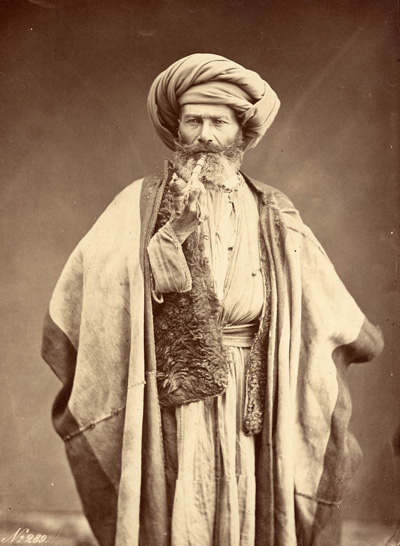
Arab man with a pipe, 1880s

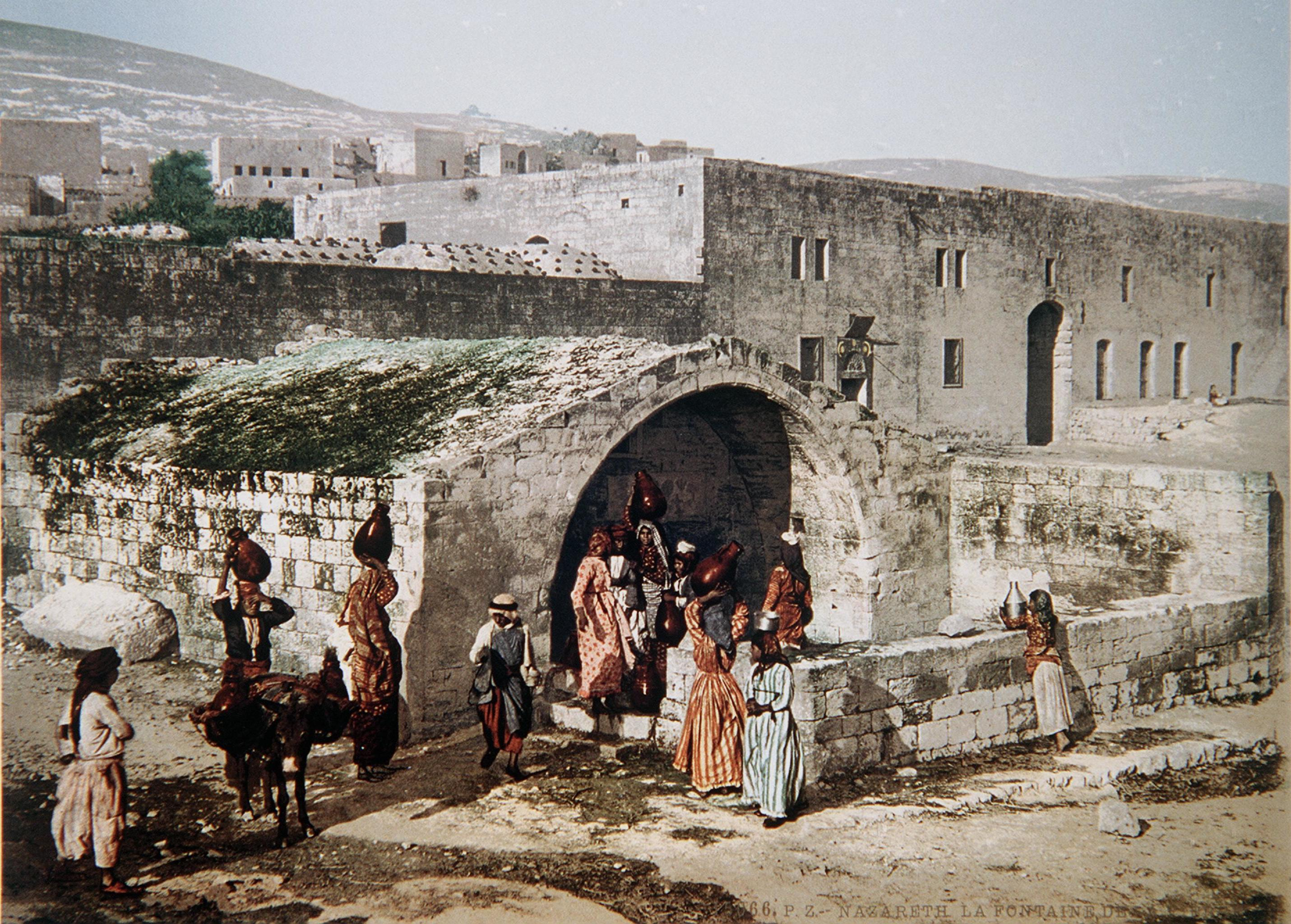
Well of St. Mary, Nazareth, 1880s, F. Bonfils

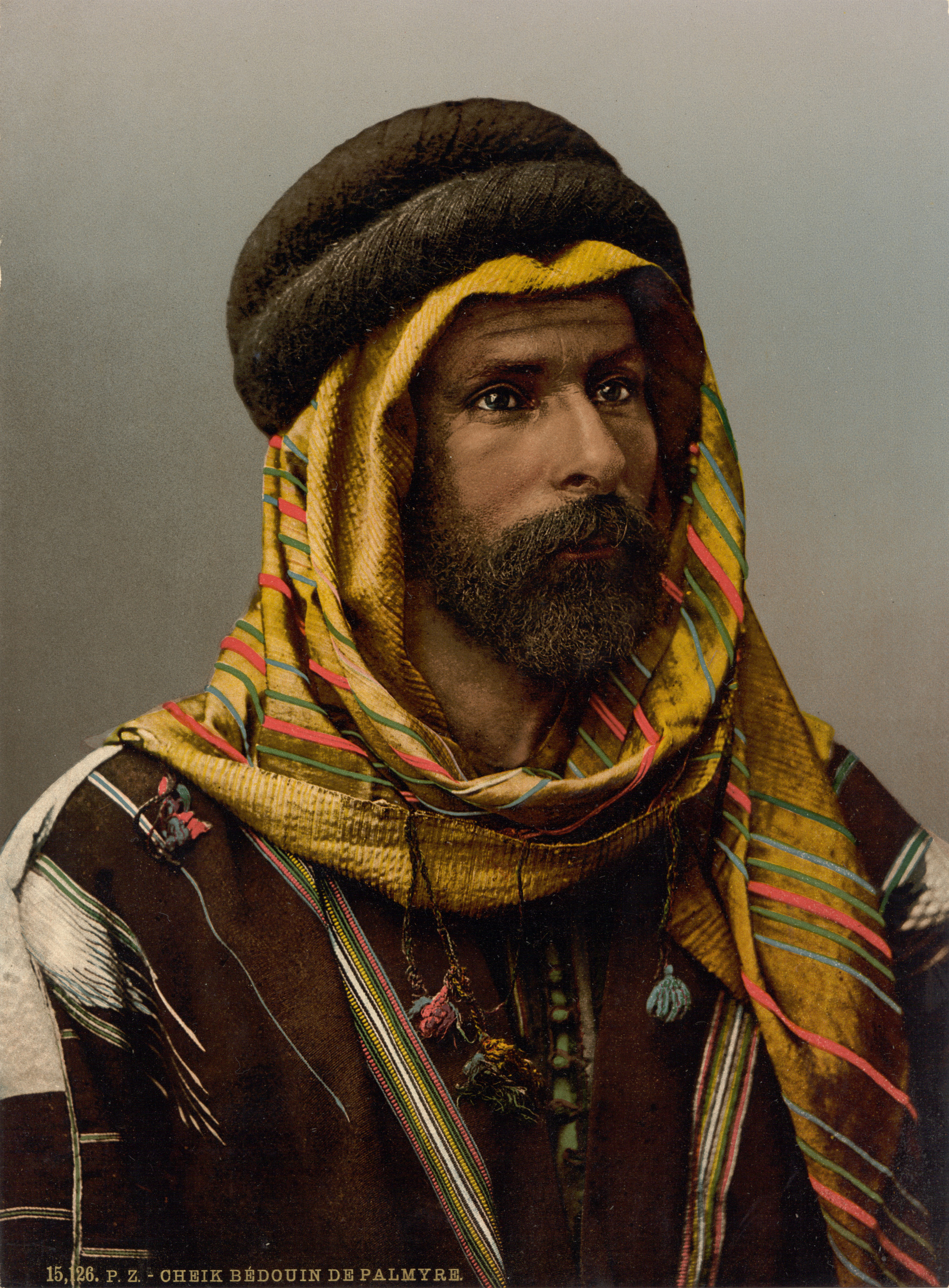
Bedouin chief of Palmyra, photochrom, 1880s

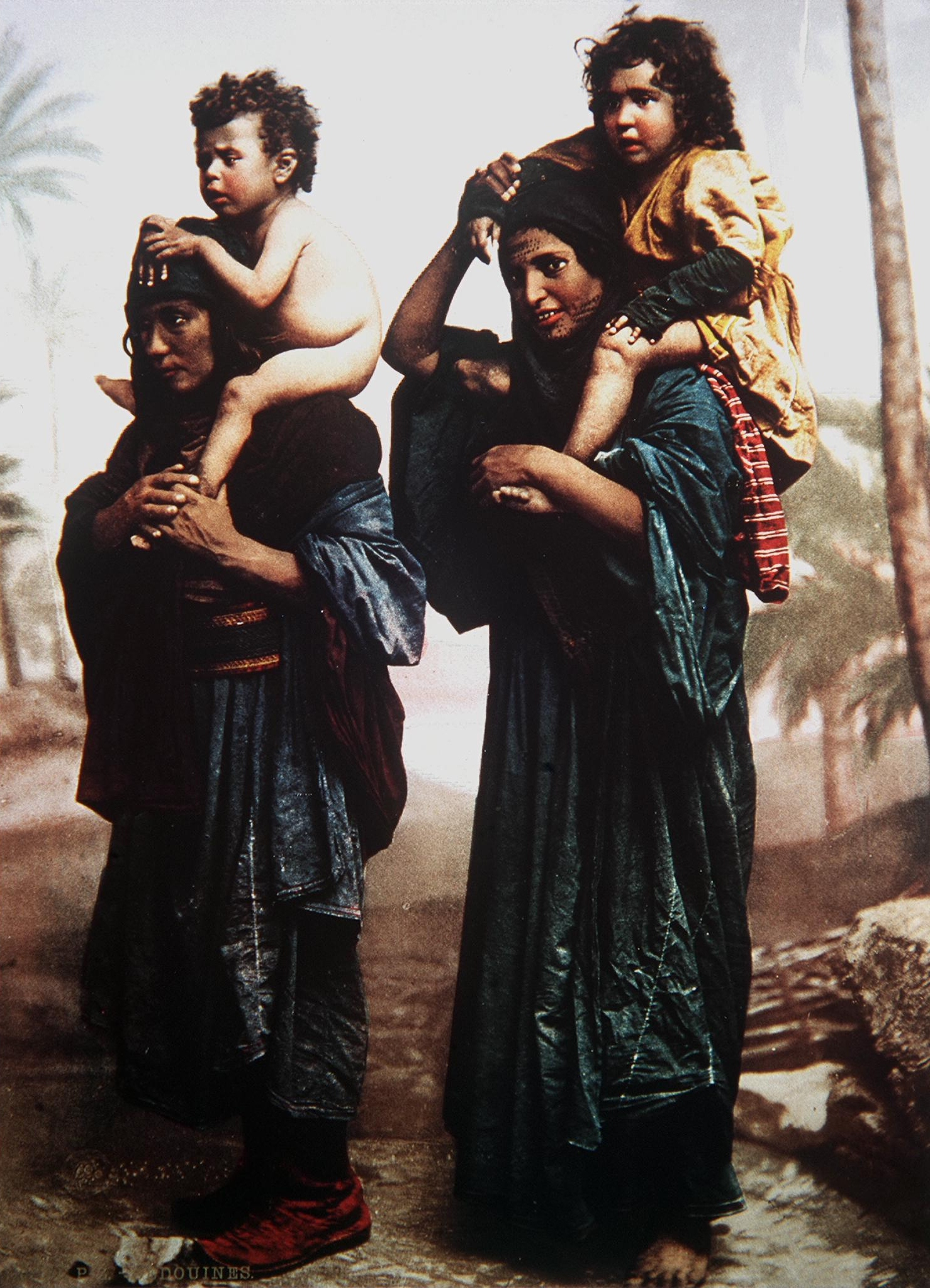
Bedouin mothers carrying their children, photochrom, 1880s

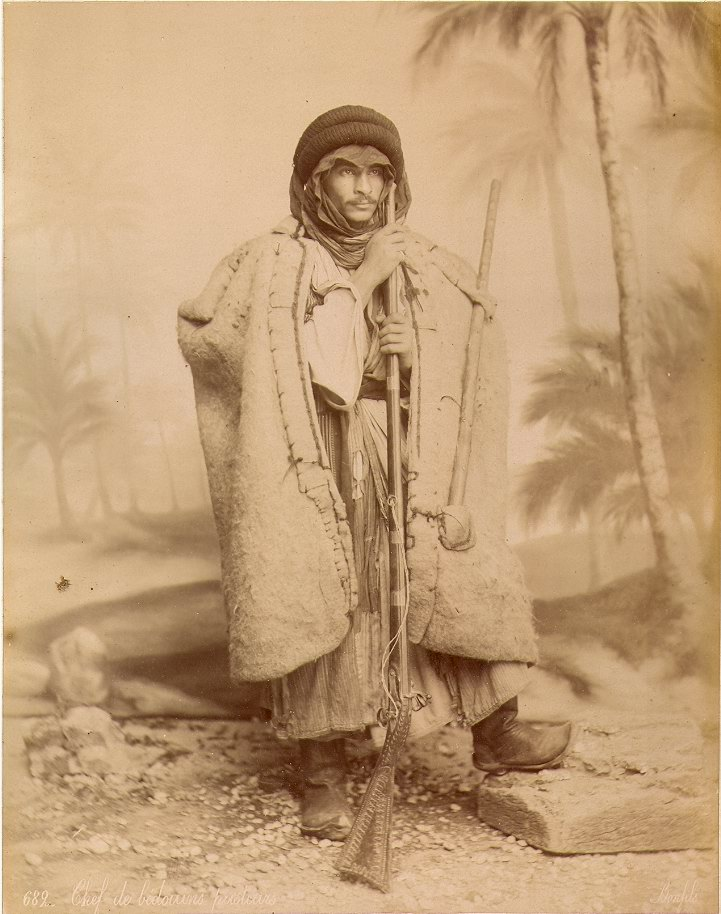
Chief of the Bedouin shepherds, 1880s

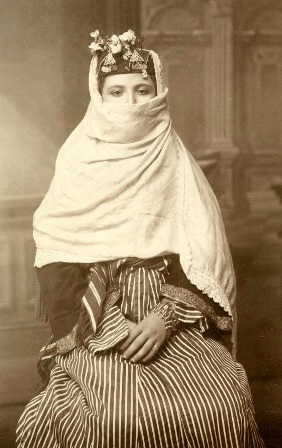
Woman from Nablus, between 1867 and 1885

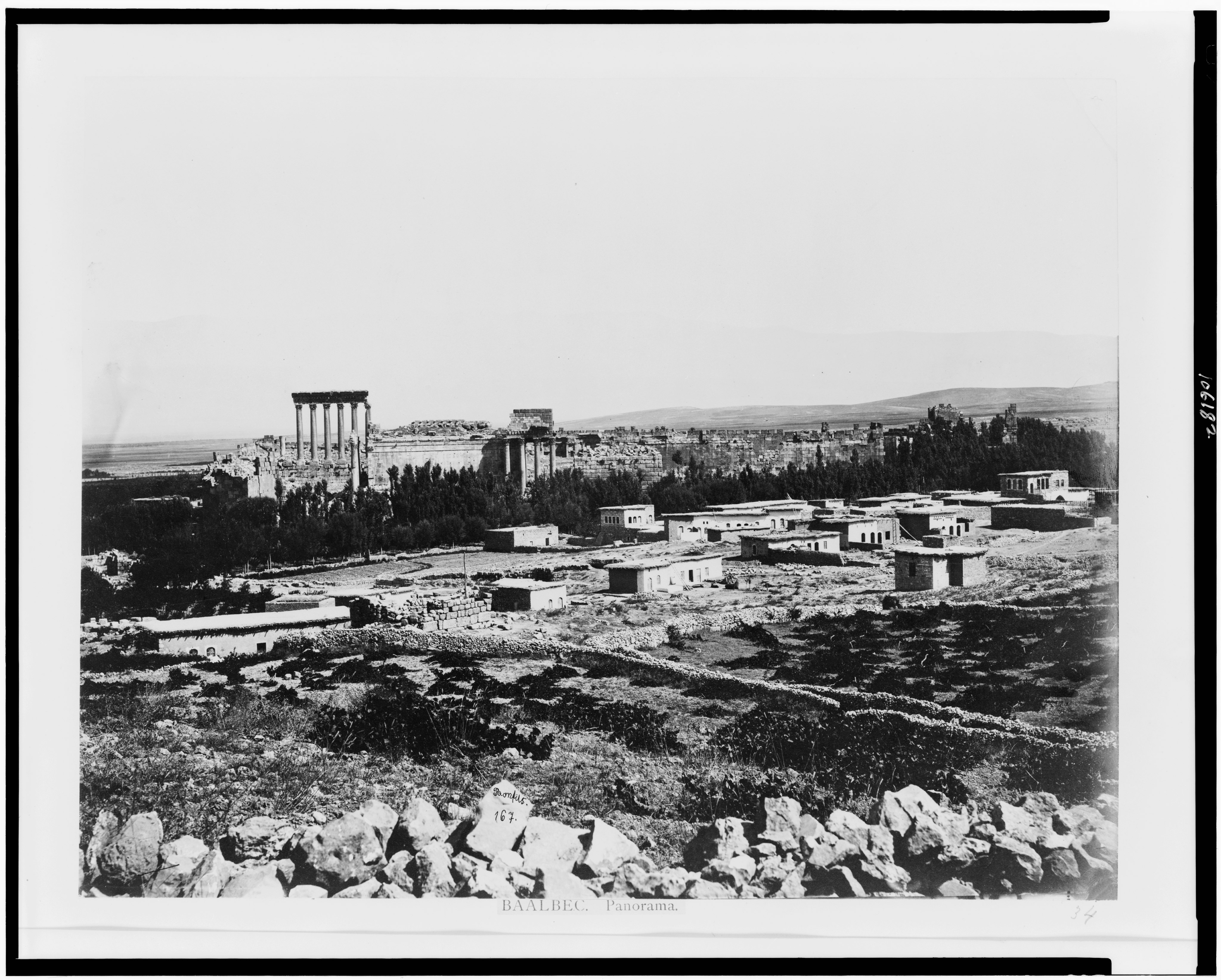
Baalbek panorama, 1870

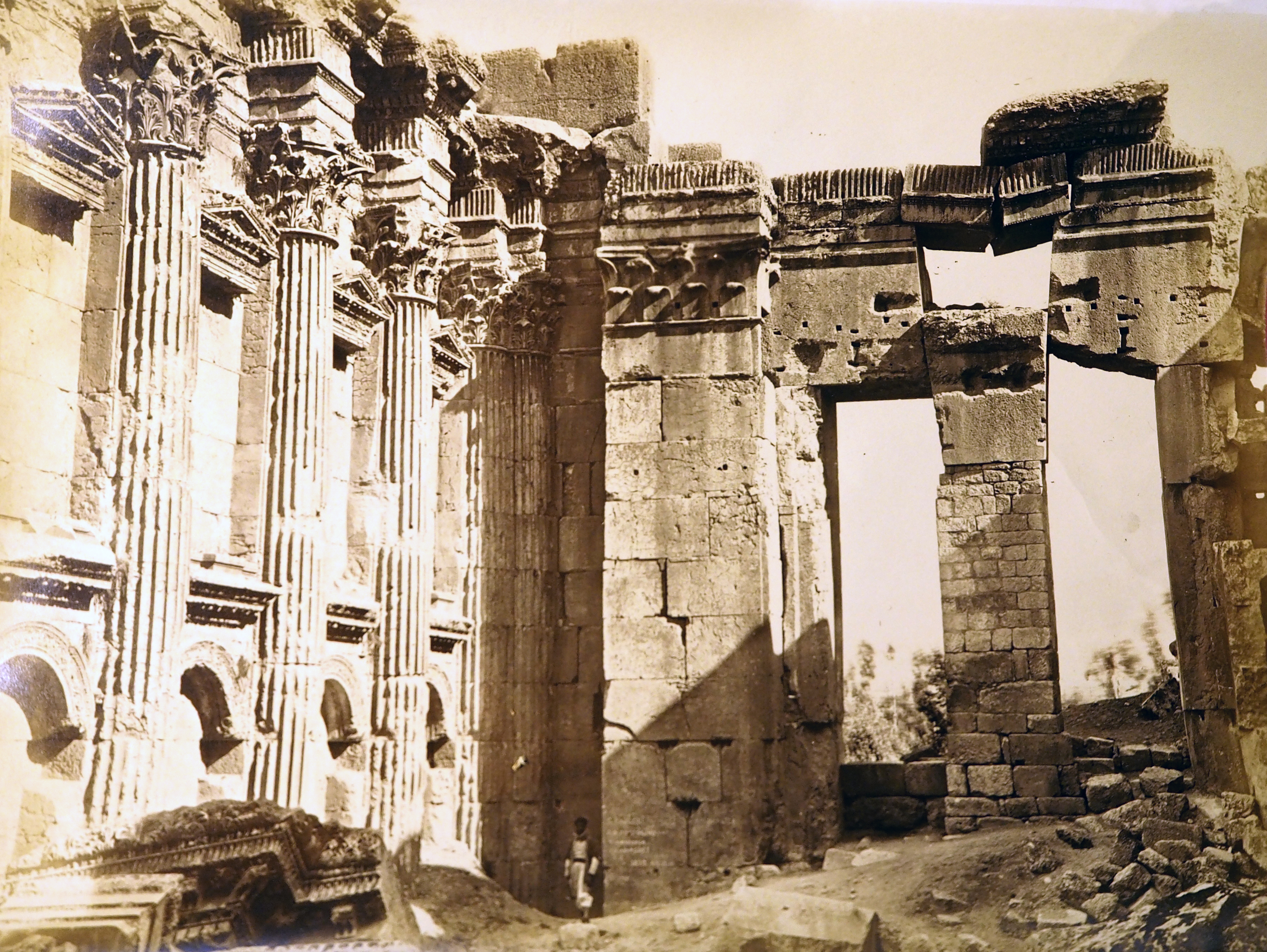
Temple of Jupiter, Baalbek, Syria, Mougins Museum of Classical Art

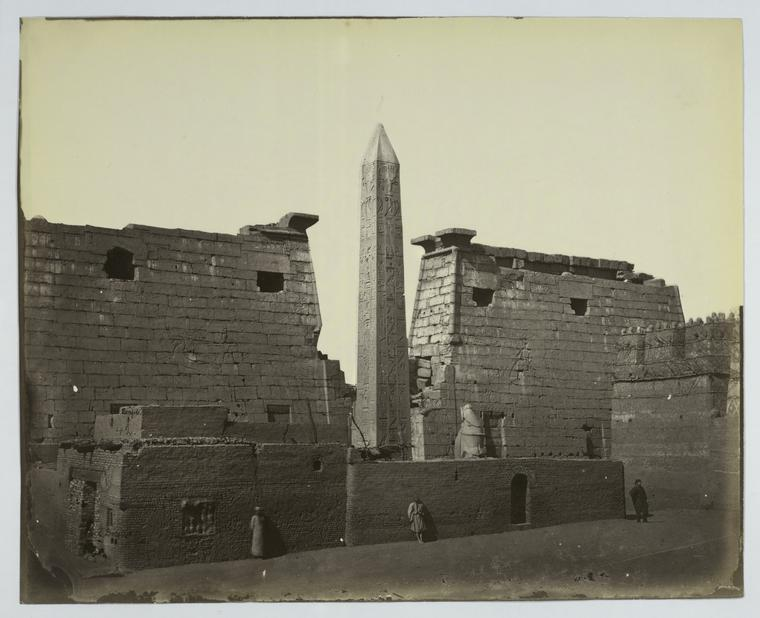
Temple at Luxor, 1867

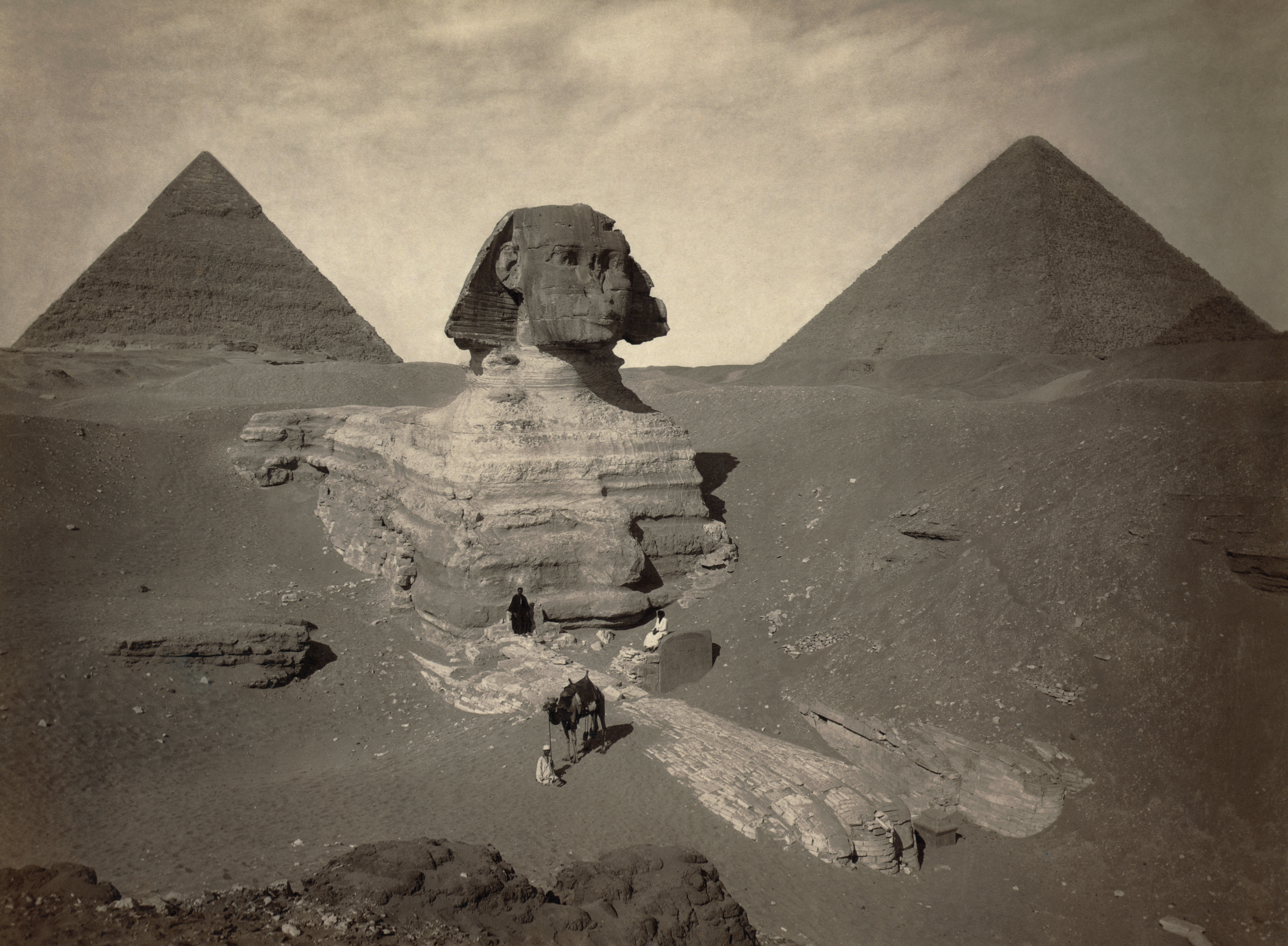
Partially excavated Sphinx, between 1867 and 1899

== Selected list of institutions holding works by F. Bonfils ==
- Brooklyn Museum
- Canadian Centre for Architecture
- Collège de France, Library of Egyptology
- Fine Arts Museums of San Francisco
- Fred Jones Jr. Museum of Art, University of Oklahoma
- Harvard University Fine Arts Library
- J. Paul Getty Museum
- Minneapolis Institute of Arts
- Nelson-Atkins Museum of Art
- Sursock Museum, with digital copies of this collection held in the Jafet Library of the American University of Beirut and the British Library Endangered Archives Programme.
- University of Michigan Museum of Art
- University of Tennessee, Knoxville
- Victoria and Albert Museum
- Virginia Museum of Fine Arts

== See also ==
- History of Photography
- List of Orientalist artists
- Orientalism
