= Marjorie Housepian Dobkin =

American writer (1922–2013)

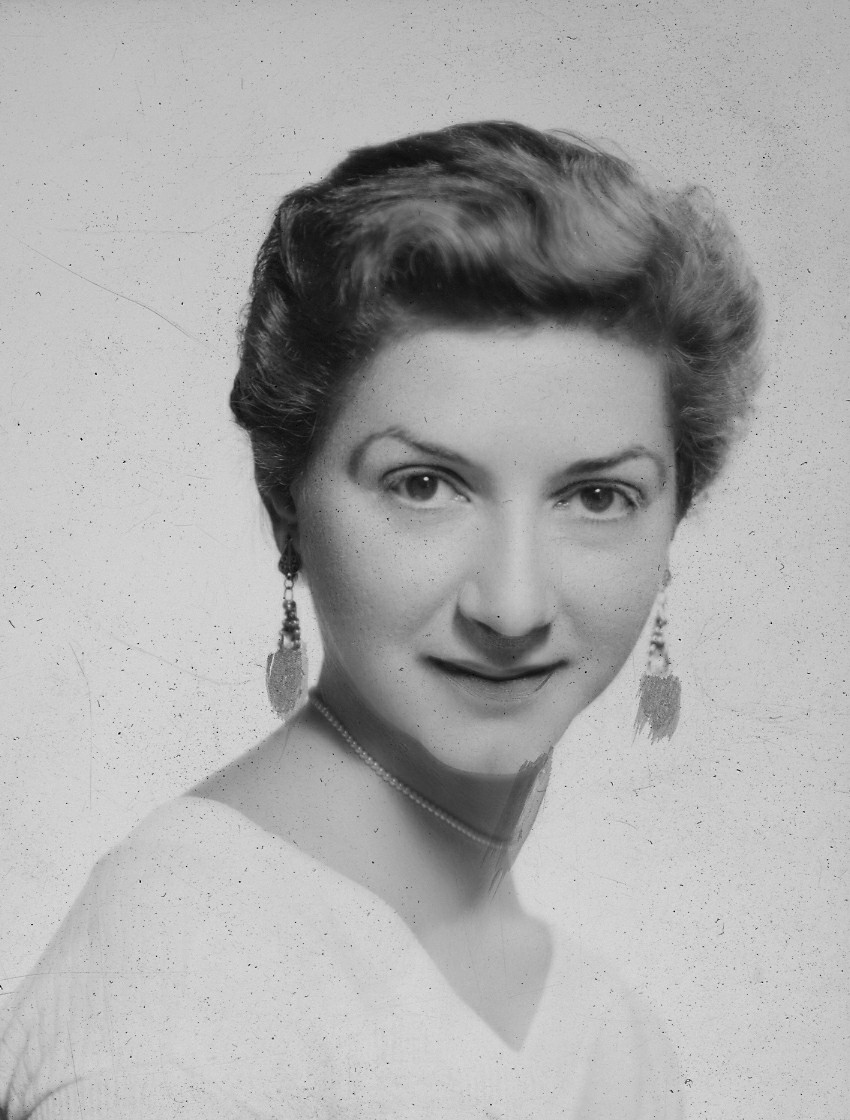
- Marjorie Housepian Dobkin c. 1957
- Born: Marjorie Anaïs Housepian; November 21, 1922; Manhattan, New York City, U.S.
- Died: February 8, 2013 (aged 90); Emerson, New Jersey, U.S.
- Citizenship: American
- Education: Barnard College (BA); Teacher's College (MA)
- Occupations: Writer, educator
- Known for: Author of A Houseful of Love and Smyrna 1922: The Destruction of a City
- Spouses: Donald Johnson (divorced); Machbi Dobkin (1957–2004; his death)
- Children: 3
- Parents: Moses Housepian (father); Makrouhie Housepian (née Ashjian) (mother)
- Relatives: Edgar Housepian (brother)

Signature
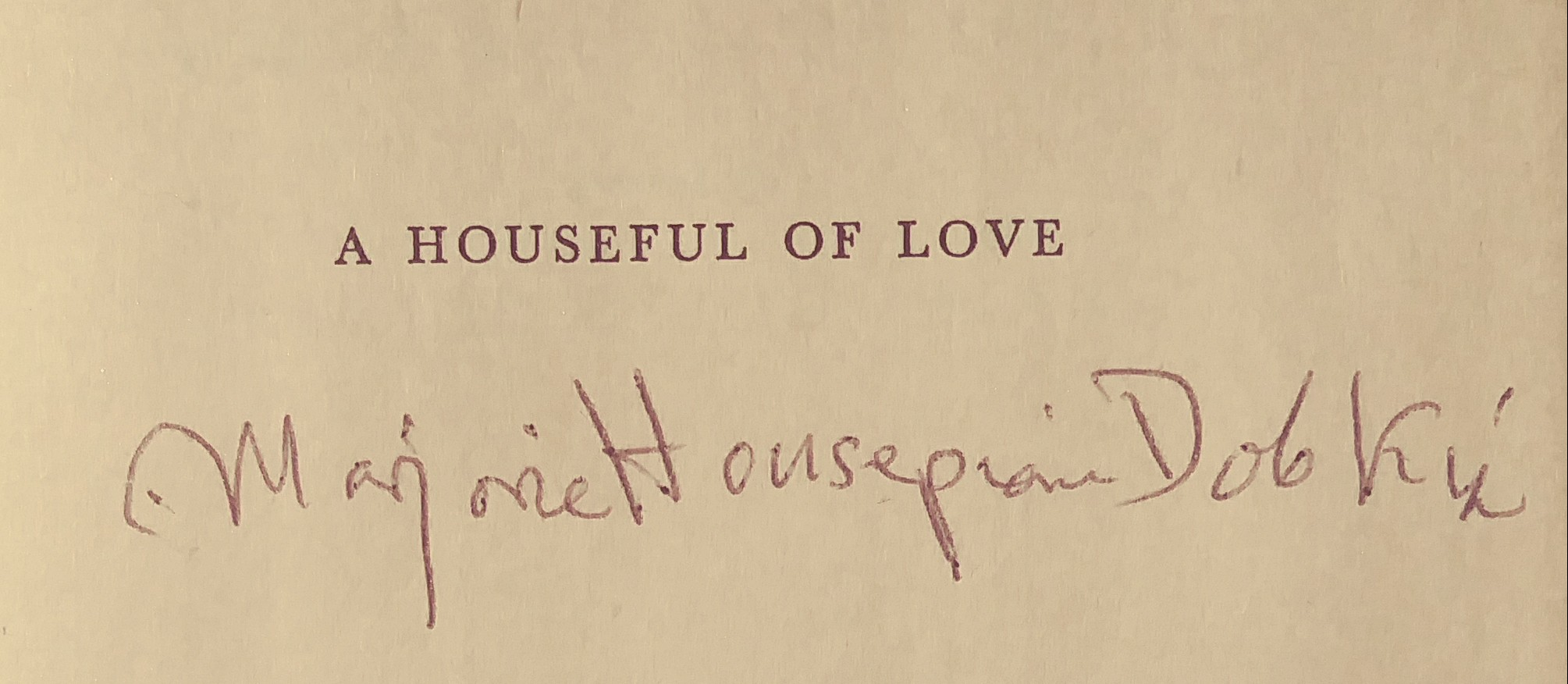

Marjorie Anaïs Housepian Dobkin (November 21, 1922 – February 8, 2013) was an author and an English professor at Barnard College, Columbia University, New York. Her books include the novel A Houseful of Love (a New York Times and New York Herald Tribune bestseller) and the history Smyrna 1922: The Destruction of a City.

== Biography ==
Housepian Dobkin was born in 1922 to Dr. Moses Housepian and his wife Makrouhie Housepian (née Ashjian), Armenian immigrants in New York City, two and a half months after her grandfather was killed by a Turkish soldier during the burning of Smyrna from which her grandmother fled as a refugee. Her younger brother was the neurosurgeon Edgar Housepian. She attended Barnard College, graduating in 1944. She was a professor of literature and writing from 1957 to 1993, as well as associate dean of studies at Barnard from 1976 until 1993. Her students included the novelist Margaret Cezair-Thompson.

Her academic career included: instructor in English at Barnard College (1957–1988), associate dean of studies (1976–1993), professor of English (1988–1993), and 1993–2013: Professor Emerita (1993–2013).

She lived near Barnard at 425 Riverside Drive.

== Work ==
Her books include the novel A Houseful of Love (a New York Times and New York Herald Tribune bestseller) and the history Smyrna 1922: The Destruction of a City.

He history of Smyrna is considered meticulously researched. It is considered the "standard work on the burning and evacuation of Smyrna". Most scholars consider it conclusive.

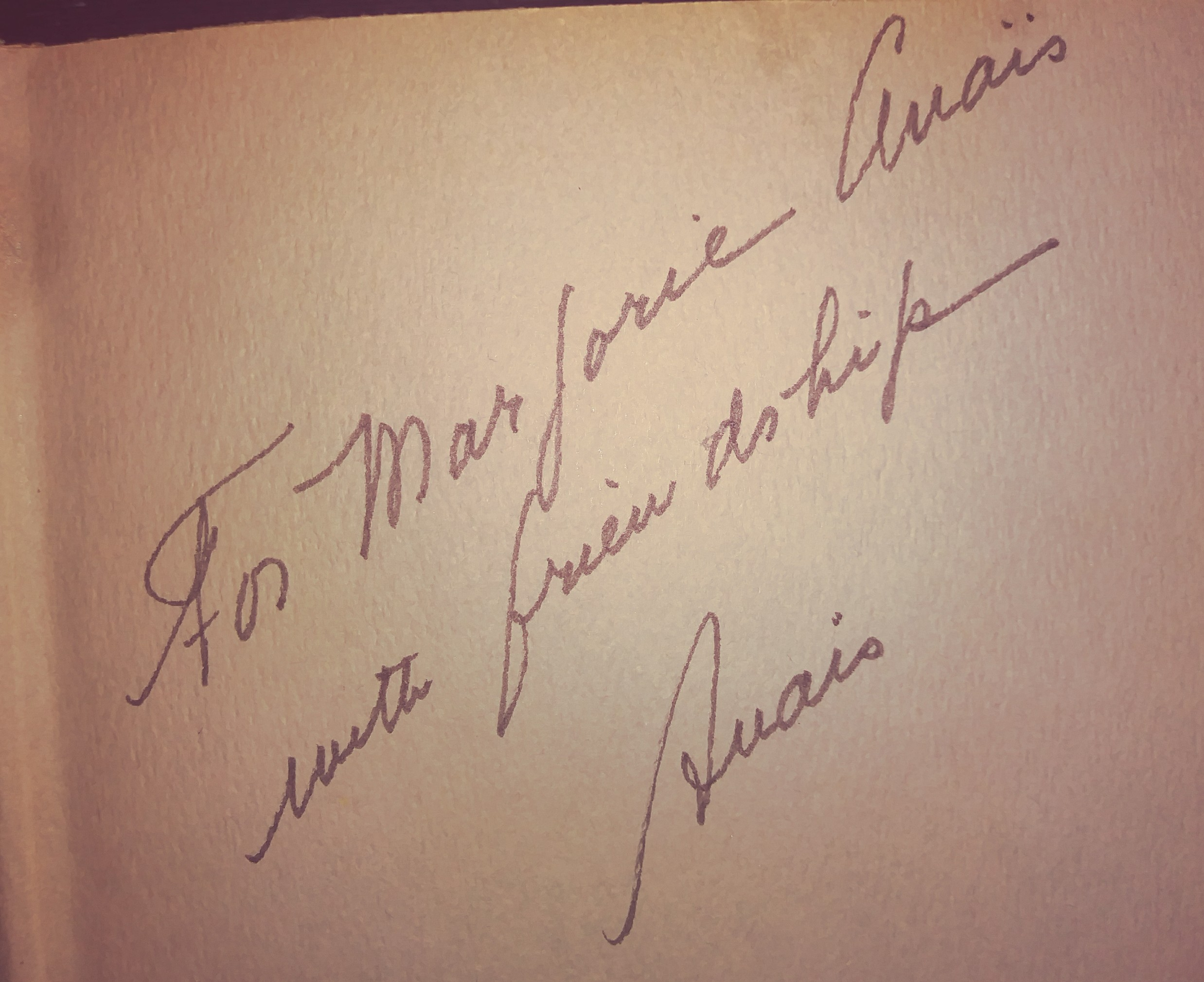
The Diary of Anaïs Nin inscribed by Anaïs Nin to Marjorie Anaïs Housepian Dobkin

== Awards and honors ==
She was awarded the Anania Shirakatsi prize of the Academy of Sciences of Soviet Armenia and was also the recipient of an honorary doctorate from Wilson College.

== Bibliography ==
- A Houseful of Love (Random House, 1957)
- The Smyrna Affair (US version, Harcourt Brave Jovanovich, 1971; republished by Newmark Press under the title Smyrna 1922: The Destruction of a City)
  - Smyrna 1922 (UK version, Faber and Faber, 1972)
- "The Unremembered Genocide" (article in Commentary)
- The Making of a Feminist: Early Journals and Letters of M. Carey Thomas (Kent State University Press, 1977)
- "George Horton and Mark L. Bristol: opposing forces in U.S. foreign policy, 1919–1923" (1983)
- Inside Out (written with Jean Cullen, Ivy Books, 1989)
