= Edgar Housepian =

American neurosurgeon

Edgar Minas Housepian
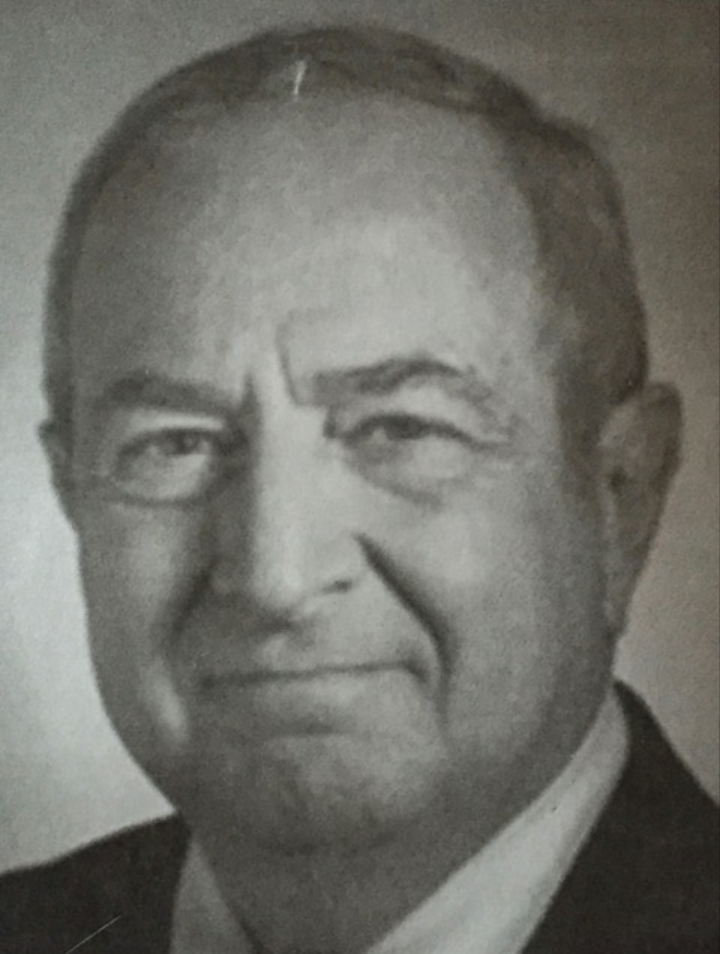
- Housepian
- Born: March 18, 1928; New York City, New York, U.S.
- Died: November 14, 2014 (aged 86); Englewood, New Jersey, U.S.
- Occupations: Neurosurgeon, professor
- Spouse: Marion Grace (née Lyon)
- Children: 3

Academic background
- Education: Columbia University

Edgar Minas Housepian (March 18, 1928 – November 14, 2014) was an American neurosurgeon at New York Presbyterian Hospital, and a Professor in the Department of Neurology at Columbia University Medical School, where he was on the faculty for almost 60 years.

He wrote more than 100 articles about neurosurgery, and was a co-founder of the Fund for Armenian Relief. At Columbia University he was also made the Dean’s special advisor for international affiliations, affiliating with universities and students on five continents to create educational opportunities which 60% of Columbia University’s medical students were taking advantage of by the time of his death.

== Early life and education ==
Edgar Minas Housepian was born March 18, 1928, in New York City. He was the son of physician Moses Housepian and the brother of the author Marjorie Housepian Dobkin. He attended Horace Mann School. Housepian graduated from Columbia College in 1949 and the Columbia University College of Physicians and Surgeons in 1953.

He was married to Marion Grace (née Lyon), together they had three children.

== Career ==
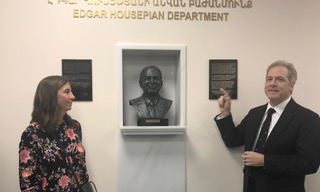
Arabkir Plus Medical Center (2019) unveiling of the bust of Edgar Housepian - by his children

From c. 1953 until 1997, he worked at the Neurological Institute of New York, a research hospital and joint venture between NewYork-Presbyterian Hospital and Columbia University Medical Center.

In response to the 1988 Armenian earthquake, Housepian and two other Armenian-Americans, Archbishop Torkom Manoogian of the Armenian Church, and the builder Kevork Hovnanian, created the Fund for Armenian Relief.

He retired from neurosurgical practice in 1997, at the age of 69.

He received dozens of awards and honors, including the Presidential Citation of Armenia in 1994; an Honorary Doctorate of Science from the Armenian National Academy of Sciences and an Honorary Doctorate of Medicine from Yerevan State Medical University in 1997; the Humanitarian Award of the American Association of Neurological Surgeons in 2002; and the Dr. Edgar Housepian Professorship in Neurological Surgery at Columbia University Medical School, established by the university's board of trustees and named in his honor.

== Death and legacy ==
He died on November 14, 2014, in Englewood, New Jersey.

In 2019, the Edgar Housepian Neurology and Neurosurgery Center was opened at Arabkir Plus Medical Center in Yerevan. In addition to being named in his honor the facility has a bust of Housepian sculpted by his daughter, Jean Housepian.
