= Lia Osipian =

Armenian botanist, mycologist

Lia Levoni Osipian (Armenian: Լիա Լևոնի Օսիպյան, born January 15, 1930) is an Armenian biologist, plant physiologist, and mycologist.

== Career ==
Born in the Armenian Soviet Socialist Republic, Osipian studied at Yerevan State University from 1947 to 1952. After graduating, she worked as an assistant and lecturer at the university until she received her doctorate in biological sciences in 1970. She became a professor in the Department of Botany in the Faculty of Botany at Yerevan State University in 1971. Twice, from 1986 to 1990 and 1999 to 2002, she served as the dean of the Faculty of Biology. In 1996, Osipian became a full member of the Armenian National Academy of Sciences and is an Honorary Scientist of Armenia. Over the course of her academic career, she has been the doctoral supervisor for over 20 students.

== Legacy ==
In 2022, a newly discovered species of fungus from Iran, Sphaerulina osypianiae, was named after her.
