= Hovsep Kirakosyan =

Armenian military officer (1988–2016)

- Born: 23 August 1988; Apaga, Armenia
- Died: 2 April 2016 (aged 27) Nagorno-Karabakh
- Allegiance: Armenia
- Branch: Armenian Armed Forces
- Service years: 2006–2016
- Rank: Captain
- Conflicts: Four-Day War †
- Awards: Republic of Armenia Military Service Medal

Hovsep Kirakosyan (Armenian: Հովսեփ Կիրակոսյան; 23 August 1988 – 2 April 2016) was a military officer in the Armenian Armed Forces who died during the 2016 Armenian-Azerbaijani clashes.

== Biography ==
He was born on 23 August 1988 in Apaga, a village in the Armavir region of Armenia. His ancestors came from the town of Sasun in Western Armenia. He has always dreamed of becoming a soldier. Both of his parents were against his enlistment, but were nonetheless proud of his high grades at the military academy.

Hovsep Kirakosyan enlisted in the Armenian Armed Forces in 2006. He went to the Vazgen Sargsyan Military Institute in Yerevan and a few years later was commissioned as a combat engineering officer. He was assigned to the Artsakh Defense Army.

=== April War ===
The April War started during the night of April 1, along the northeastern part of the Artsakh-Azerbaijan contact line, when the Azerbaijani Armed Forces carried out a large-scale offensive against the Armenian side. At the time, Captain Kirakosyan was living with his wife and children in the village of Mataghis of the province of Martakert in the Artsakh Republic. His wife, Mariam, said that during the night, there was a knock on their bedroom window, from which they both woke up and were told that they needed to get their children out of the village as fast as possible. While Mariam escaped the village with their two young sons, Hovsep joined his unit and led his men to battle.

Kirakosyan was one of the first soldiers to fall in the April War. During the fighting, one of his soldiers saw that blood was coming from his ears and eyes. His men were not able to remove him from the area because of intense shooting. He continued to fight, telling his soldiers, "Boys, I am fine. You go fight." He would eventually succumb to his wounds and die of bloodloss.

Captain Hovsep Kirakosyan's memorial service took place on the 4th of April, 2016 in the culture center of the Apaga village and his funeral took place on 5 April. He is survived by his wife, two siblings (one older brother and a younger sister), and his two children.

== Awards ==
Had he survived the war, Captain Hovsep Kirakosyan was going to be promoted to major in October 2016.

He was posthumously awarded with the Republic of Armenia "Military Service" medal.
