= Moses Housepian =

Doctor for refugees from the Armenian genocide

Moses Minas Housepian
- Մովսես Մինասի Հովսեփյան
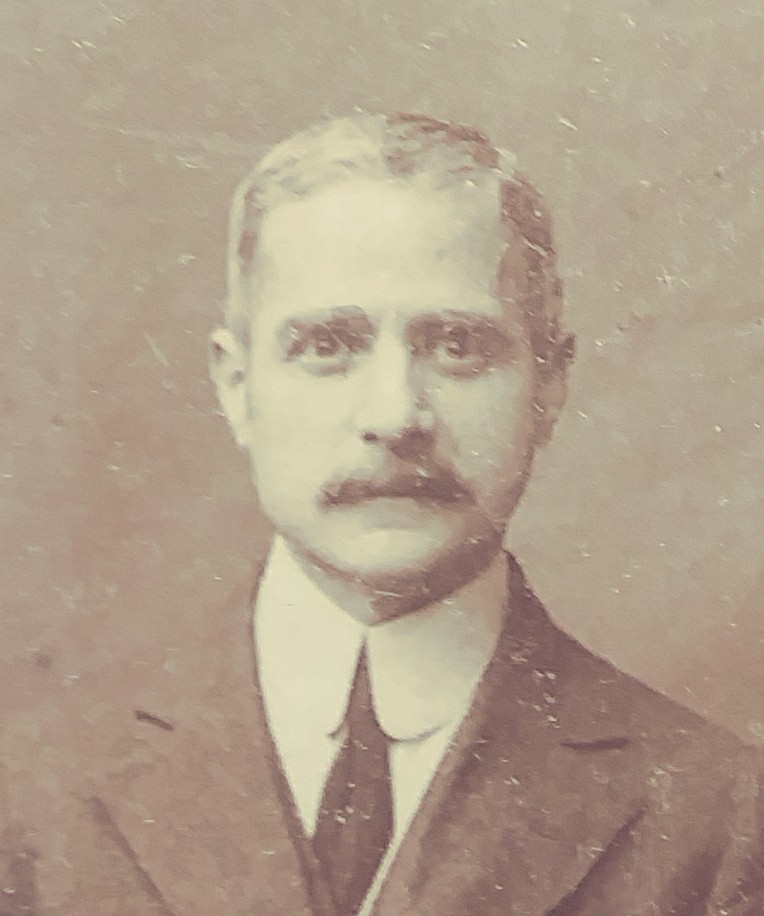
- Housepian (1916)
- Born: 1876; Kessab, Cilicia, Ottoman Empire
- Died: December 11, 1952 (aged 75–76); New York City, New York
- Other name: Movses Housepian
- Education: Long Island College Hospital
- Known for: physician, humanitarian aid worker
- Spouse: Makrouhie Ashjian
- Children: Edgar Housepian, Marjorie Housepian Dobkin

Moses Minas Housepian (Armenian: Մովսես Մինասի Հովսեփյան; 1876 – December 11, 1952) was a Syrian-born Armenian-American physician and humanitarian aid worker.

== Biography ==
Moses Minas Housepian was born in 1876 in Kessab, Cilicia, Ottoman Empire (now Syria). He escaped the Hamidian massacres in his youth. He graduated from Long Island College Hospital (LICH) in 1905.

He later headed a humanitarian medical mission in Russian Armenia from 1916 to 1918 treating refugees from the Armenian genocide. He is credited with stopping the spread of a typhus epidemic and was known as the "Angel of Mercy", and as "Dr. Purgich" (English: "Dr. Saviour").

Housepian was active in the Armenian Democratic Liberal Party, whose chapter in New York City was posthumously named for him. His wife, Makrouhie Housepian (née Ashjian), was active in the Armenian General Benevolent Union and other Armenian causes. Moses and Makrouhie Housepian were the parents of Marjorie Housepian Dobkin and Edgar Housepian.

Housepian died on December 11, 1952, in New York City.
