= Kevin Lewis (director) =

American filmmaker

- Born: Denver, Colorado, US
- Education: USC School of Cinematic Arts
- Occupations: Film director, screenwriter, producer
- Works: Malibu Spring Break (2003); The Third Nail (2008); Willy's Wonderland (2021)
- Children: 4

Kevin Lewis is an American film director, screenwriter, and producer. Best known for his drama crime film The Third Nail (2008) and his action comedy horror film Willy's Wonderland (2021), his body of work spans many film genres and multiple decades of cinema.

== Career ==
After directing and producing three independent feature films, Lewis had his breakthrough with Malibu Spring Break (2003). It was the first and only release for Crown International Pictures after fourteen years of dormancy, for a production company that had previously been a major force in the B-movie and low-budget film world. Despite starring Playboy Playmate Pilar Lastra, the film received negative reviews upon its 2008 release. In 2007, Lewis directed The Third Nail, a crime drama film.

After this, he took more than a decade away from the feature film world. He returned to direct Willy's Wonderland, written by G. O. Parsons. It had the highest budget of any Lewis film, at approximately five million dollars, and starred Nicolas Cage as a quiet drifter who is tricked into cleaning up an abandoned family entertainment center inhabited by eight murderous animatronic characters who are possessed with the souls of a cannibalistic killer and his seven psychotic colleagues. It received mixed reviews from critics, but quickly achieved cult film status and drew buzz for a potential sequel.

== Filmography ==
| Year | Title | Director | Writer | Producer |
|---|---|---|---|---|
| 1996 | The Method | Yes | Yes | Yes |
| 1998 | Andrew Jackson White Elk | Yes | No | Yes |
| 2001 | Downward Angel | Yes | Yes | No |
| 2003 | Malibu Spring Break | Yes | Yes | No |
| 2006 | Dark Heart | Yes | Yes | No |
| 2006 | The Drop | Yes | Yes | No |
| 2008 | The Third Nail | Yes | Yes | No |
| 2021 | Willy's Wonderland | Yes | No | No |
| 2022 | The Accursed | Yes | No | Yes |
| 2024 | Oak | Yes | No | Executive |
| 2024 | Shelby Oaks | No | No | Co-producer |
| 2025 | Pig Hill | Yes | No | No |
| 2026 | Misdirection | Yes | No | No |
| 2026 | Christmas at the Kringles | Yes | No | Yes |

Second unit director

- The Third Society (2002)
