= The Mean One =

2022 film by Steven LaMorte

- Theatrical release poster
- Directed by: Steven LaMorte
- Screenplay by: Flip Kobler; Finn Kobler
- Story by: Steven LaMorte
- Based on: How the Grinch Stole Christmas! by Dr. Seuss
- Produced by: Amy Schumacher; Steven LaMorte; Martine Melloul
- Starring: David Howard Thornton; Krystle Martin; Chase Mullins; John Bigham; Erik Baker; Flip Kobler; Amy Schumacher
- Cinematography: Christopher Sheffield
- Edited by: Mathew Roscoe
- Music by: Yael Benamour
- Production companies: Sleight of Hand Productions; Amy Rose Productions; Kali Pictures
- Distributed by: Atlas Film Distribution
- Release date: December 9, 2022
- Running time: 93 minutes
- Country: United States
- Language: English
- Box office: $1 million

The Mean One is a 2022 American Christmas slasher film directed by Steven LaMorte from a screenplay written by Flip and Finn Kobler. It is an unlicensed parody of Dr. Seuss' 1957 children's book How the Grinch Stole Christmas! and its adaptations, and stars Krystle Martin, Chase Mullins, John Bigham, Erik Baker, Flip Kobler, and Amy Schumacher, with David Howard Thornton as the eponymous character. It follows a young woman as she attempts to defend her childhood town from a green-skinned creature who goes on a murderous rampage during the holiday season.

The film was first announced by XYZ Films in October 2022, who collaborated with A Sleight of Hand Productions, Amy Rose Productions and Kali Pictures on its production. Because it is unauthorized, the film never uses the language of the original book. The Mean One was released by Atlas Film Distribution theatrically on December 9, 2022 and received generally negative reviews from critics and audiences.

== Plot ==
During Christmas Eve in the town of Newville, a green humanoid being dressed in a Santa Claus suit attempts to rob the Christmas decorations from the home of a young girl named Cindy. She stumbles upon the creature and gives him a necklace until her mother attempts to fight him. In the struggle, the creature accidentally pushes Cindy's mother against a nail that pierces her neck, killing her. Before the creature escapes, Cindy calls him a "monster", angering the creature.

Twenty years later, Cindy returns to Newville for closure and to spend Christmas with her father, Lou. She bonds with police officer Burke Goldman and reunites with Newville's sheriff Peter Hooper, who continues to dismiss Cindy's claim of her mother's murderer being a monster due to lack of evidence. He reveals that Newville stopped selling or putting up Christmas decorations after the incident. That night, Lou finds old Christmas decorations and puts them up with Cindy. While she is taking out the trash, the creature locks her out and kills Lou before stealing their decorations.

Cindy later wakes up in the hospital, where she meets Newville's mayor Margie McBean, who is uncomfortable with Cindy's claims of the creature, believing it will cause panic. After her father's funeral, Cindy finds a rare flower in her home and traces it to a mountain via a website. Cindy finds the wallet of a missing person and sees the creature killing a couple before retreating. Shortly after, Hooper tells Cindy he cannot investigate as the mountain is in federal territory, although Burke agrees to help. Meanwhile, the creature slaughters a group of Santa cosplayers in a local bar.

As the creature attempts to break into Cindy's home, he is scared off by a man known as Doc Zeuss, who believes Cindy's story since his wife was murdered by the creature years ago. Burke goes to the mountain and finds the creature's hideout with several wallets of missing people. Cindy trains and prepares to kill the creature, who rampages through Newville and kills several residents. Burke discourages Cindy from facing the creature and finds out the wallets all belonged to tourists who were lured to the mountain by the same website Cindy saw, which is owned by Mayor McBean. He confronts Hooper, who confirms the creature's existence and explains that after Cindy's mother's death, the creature returned every Christmas to slaughter more people, and later his hideout was found. Hooper and Mayor McBean collaborated to make the website and send unsuspecting tourists as sacrifices in order to stop the creature's killing spree in addition to removing all Christmas decorations from the town.

Mayor McBean attempts to leave the town, but the creature kills her on the way. Burke heads to the mountain to kill the creature but becomes injured and is rescued by Cindy, Hooper, and Doc. Hooper goes after the creature but is killed. Cindy retreats to her decorated home and waits for the creature. When the creature arrives, she ambushes and engages him in a fight. Cindy finally incapacitates the creature, but before she can kill him, Cindy sees that he is still wearing the necklace she gave him twenty years ago. Realizing that the creature never wanted to hurt anyone and that his murderous behavior sparked only when she called him a "monster", Cindy forgives the creature and kisses him on the cheek. This act of kindness causes the creature's heart to grow three sizes, which ends up exploding and kills him. Sometime after, Newville reverts to displaying Christmas ornaments. The creature is deemed an urban legend, causing the town to become a popular tourist destination while Cindy and Burke start a romantic relationship. As the movie ends, the narrator implies that the creature may return for next year, as its roar can be heard.

== Cast ==
- David Howard Thornton as the Mean One
- Krystle Martin as Cindy
- Chase Mullins as Detective Burke
- John Bigham as Doc Zeuss
- Erik Baker as Sheriff Hooper
- Flip Kobler as Lou
- Amy Schumacher as Mayor McBean

== Production ==
=== Background ===
The basis for The Mean One originated from a four-minute pitch trailer of a horror parody of Dr. Seuss's 1957 children's book How the Grinch Stole Christmas! made in December of 2021. Director Steven LaMorte had always enjoyed the source material, and experimented with the idea of "presenting it with a horror comedy twist." According to cast and crew members, it was never actually intended to be made into a full-length feature film. However, after the trailer gained an increased popularity on the internet, it was decided to expand the trailer into a full-length feature.

=== Development ===
On October 7, 2022, XYZ Films announced that they were collaborating with A Sleight of Hands Productions, Amy Rose Productions and Kali Pictures on distributing an unauthorized horror parody of Dr. Seuss's 1957 children's book How the Grinch Stole Christmas!.

XYZ Films' Manager of Acquisitions and Development Alex Williams stated:

As a passionate fan of seasonal horror (and the Terrifier franchise), The Mean One is exactly the kind of film that lands on my personal 'nice list.' This movie is a stunningly great time with a ferociously subversive turn from David Howard Thornton – and XYZ Films is so proud to be bringing this soon-to-be iconic Christmas slasher to audiences this holiday season.

On November 23, 2022, it was announced that the film would theatrically debut on December 9, 2022, courtesy of Atlas Film Distribution, with XYZ Films no longer involved in the release of the film.

== Release ==
The Mean One was released theatrically in the United States on December 9, 2022.

=== Home media ===
The Mean One was released on DVD, Blu-ray, and digital download on October 3, 2023.

== Reception ==
On the review aggregator website Rotten Tomatoes, 26% of 27 critics' reviews are positive, with an average rating of 3.8/10. The website's consensus reads: "A killjoy entry into the debauched children's story horror canon, The Mean One delivers a seasonally macabre bag of lime green coal." Metacritic, which uses a weighted average, assigned the film a score of 29 out of 100, based on six critics, indicating "generally unfavorable" reviews.

Vikram Murthi of IndieWire gave it a "D+" grade, writing: "While The Mean One wraps up in a predictable fashion, albeit with a somewhat reactionary message that calling out monstrous acts leads people (or Grinches?) to turn into murderous monsters, it also acknowledges social media's involvement in the film's existence. The Mean One originally was a trailer that ostensibly turned into a viral sensation, so much so that it motivated LaMorte to make a full-length feature. Sure enough, the film plays like a plodding, 90-minute version of a two-minute joke that doesn't even have the decency to be funny. A sight gag of a killer Grinch is good for a snort or a half-hearted chuckle. If you build a feature film around him, you become a Grinch yourself."

Alex DiVincenzo of Bloody Disgusting gave the film a 2.5 out of 5 rating, writing: "a concept this outrageous is begging to go full camp, but only occasional moments of self awareness shine among material that's otherwise played straight." He adds that "[a] majority of the performances border on melodramatic", while "Thornton carries the film on his back like a sack of presents."

== See also ==
- The Twisted Childhood Universe
- The Mouse Trap
- Popeye the Slayer Man
- The Banana Splits Movie
- Willy's Wonderland
