= Willy's Wonderland =

2021 comedy horror film by Kevin Lewis

- Theatrical release poster
- Directed by: Kevin Lewis
- Written by: G. O. Parsons
- Produced by: Nicolas Cage; Grant Cramer; Jeremy Davis; David Ozer; Bryan Lord
- Starring: Nicolas Cage; Emily Tosta; Ric Reitz; David Sheftell; Beth Grant
- Cinematography: David Newbert
- Edited by: Ryan Liebert
- Music by: Émoi
- Production companies: Landmark Studio Group; Baffin Media LTD; Saturn Films; JD Entertainment; Landafar Entertainment
- Distributed by: Screen Media Films
- Release date: February 12, 2021
- Running time: 88 minutes
- Country: United States
- Language: English
- Budget: $5 million
- Box office: $457,144

Willy's Wonderland is a 2021 American action comedy horror film directed by Kevin Lewis from a screenplay written by G. O. Parsons. The film stars Nicolas Cage, who also served as producer, along with Emily Tosta, Ric Reitz, David Sheftell, and Beth Grant. It follows a quiet drifter who is tricked into cleaning up an abandoned family entertainment center inhabited by eight murderous animatronic mascots who are possessed by the souls of a cannibalistic killer and his colleagues.

The project was announced in October 2019, with screenwriter Parsons having conceived the idea. It caught Cage's attention, who agreed to participate as both an actor and a producer. Lewis was hired as director in December 2019 while the main cast joined in February 2020.

Willy's Wonderland was originally set for a worldwide theatrical release on October 30, 2020, but was postponed in response to the COVID-19 pandemic. Instead, it was released through video on demand, with a simultaneous limited theatrical release in the United States, on February 12, 2021, by Screen Media. The film received mixed reviews, with praise for Cage's performance.

== Plot ==
When his vehicle breaks down outside Hayesville, Nevada, a quiet drifter is picked up by local mechanic Jed Love, who takes him to Willy's Wonderland, a once-successful abandoned family entertainment center inhabited by eight now-withered animatronic mascots: Willy Weasel, Arty Alligator, Cammy Chameleon, Ozzie Ostrich, Tito Turtle, Knighty Knight, Gus Gorilla, and Siren Sara.

The restaurant's owner Tex Macadoo offers him work as a night-shift janitor in exchange for repairing his vehicle before he and Jed leave him locked inside it. Meanwhile, teenager Liv Hawthorne attempts to burn down the restaurant but she gets handcuffed by her guardian, Hayesville's sheriff Eloise Lund. After Lund leaves, Liv is freed by her friends Chris, Kathy, Aaron, Bob, and Dan.

As the Janitor begins his duties, the animatronics are revealed to be sentient and homicidal. Ozzie attacks him but is beaten to death with a mop. Liv enters the restaurant through the vents to get the Janitor out while her friends douse the perimeter with gasoline. Simultaneously, the Janitor is attacked by Gus in the restrooms; he fatally curb stomps Gus's face into a urinal. Arty chases Liv but she escapes into a fairy-themed room where Sara attacks her. Liv manages to fend off Sara and encounters the Janitor, who ignores her warnings about the animatronics and refuses to leave.

Outside, Liv's friends climb to the roof, which collapses and causes them to fall inside. Liv explains to the Janitor that the restaurant was originally owned by notorious serial killer Jerry Robert Willis. He and his seven cannibalistic colleagues slaughtered unsuspecting families, but the authorities eventually discovered them. They performed a satanic ritual to transfer their souls into the animatronics before committing suicide. When Liv finishes, several animatronics awaken and attack the group.

In the ensuing chaos, Knighty fatally impales Aaron with his sword, Dan is eaten alive by Tito and Sara, The Janitor kills Knighty by decapitating him with his own sword, and Arty mauls Bob and Kathy to death in a party room. After Bob and Kathy are killed by Arty, The Janitor steps in and kills Arty by breaking his jaws. As Cammy stalks Chris in an arcade, he calls Lund for help; she goes to the restaurant with deputy sheriff Evan Olson upon learning that Liv is there.

On the way, Lund reveals to Evan that, after the restaurant was shut down, the animatronics continued murdering people around Hayesville until she, Tex, and Jed made a deal with them. Over the years, they tricked random drifters into cleaning up the restaurant, offering them as human sacrifices in order to stop the animatronics' killing spree. Liv's parents were among the victims and a guilty Lund adopted her. When the Janitor and Liv arrive at the arcade, Cammy snaps Chris's neck, killing him. They subdue Cammy and attempt to leave before Lund and Evan stop them. Lund handcuffs the Janitor and leaves him to die as Evan takes Liv away. While driving back, Evan is killed by a stowaway Tito as Liv escapes.

In the restaurant, the Janitor subdues Sara and fatally twists Cammy's head, killing her. An enraged Lund tries to lure Willy to kill the Janitor, only for Willy to tear her in half. Willy and the Janitor fight each other until the Janitor kills him by hitting his face repeatedly with a bag filled with soda cans and ripping his head off. The next morning, Tex and Jed return and find the restaurant completely clean, with the animatronics missing. The Janitor receives his repaired vehicle and invites Liv to accompany him. While Tex and Jed discuss planning to re-open the restaurant, Sara suddenly appears, and sets their car on fire with gasoline, causing a massive explosion that kills the three. As the sun rises, the Janitor and Liv drive out of the town, running over a wandering Tito along the way, killing him.

== Cast ==
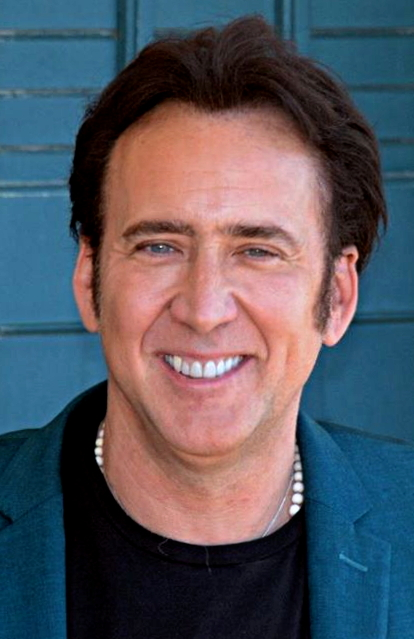
Nicolas Cage stars as the Janitor

=== Human cast ===
- Nicolas Cage as the Janitor
- Emily Tosta as Liv Hawthorne
- Beth Grant as Sheriff Eloise Lund
- David Sheftell as Deputy Evan Olson
- Ric Reitz as Tex Macadoo
- Chris Warner as Jed Love
- Kai Kadlec as Chris Muley
- Caylee Cowan as Kathy Barnes
- Terayle Hill as Bob McDaniel
- Christian Del Grosso as Aaron Powers
- Jonathan Mercedes as Dan Lorraine
- Grant Cramer as Jerry Robert Willis
- Chris Padilla as Jim Hawthorne
- Olga Cramer as Judy Hawthorne
- Kamia Arrington as Little Liv

Also appearing in supporting roles are Jason Tyler as Eric Miller, a construction worker hired to demolish the restaurant; Ryan Kightlinger as a biker hired as a previous janitor; Joseph and Jessica Teagle as a hippie couple also hired as previous janitors; Lawreen K. Yakkel, Ashann Bachan, Kevin Brown, Eduardo Lozano, Nathaniel Smith Jr., and D. J. Stavropoulos as members of Jerry Robert Willis's satanic cult; Michael Woodruff, J. J. Madaris, Robert Howell, Chris Speck, Benton Eden, and Elliott Boswell as ATF agents; Jared Soto as a homeless man; Kandace Lee as a smoker killed by Willy Weasel, and Miles Woodruff as a birthday boy from the flashbacks.

=== Animatronic cast ===
Character	Performer	Voice
Willy Weasel	Jiri Stanek	Émoi
Tito Turtle	Chris Schmidt Jr.	Abel Arias
Ozzie Ostrich	B. J. Guyer	Abel Arias
Gus Gorilla	Billy Bussey	Mark Gagliardi
Cammy Chameleon	Taylor Towery	Madisun Leigh
Siren Sara	Jessica Graves	Jessica Graves
Knighty Knight	Duke Jackson	Unvoiced
Arty Alligator	Christopher Bradley	Unvoiced

== Production ==
=== Development ===
The film was first announced in October 2019 by Screen Media Films after screenwriter and producer G. O. Parsons was advised to create a film to expand his career around 2015 to early 2016, but was displeased with his first attempt, a short film titled Wally's Wonderland. He put the script on Blood List, seeking to have it produced as a full-length film. Shortly after, Deadline Hollywood confirmed that Nicolas Cage had joined the cast after the script, which became popular on the site, caught his attention. Cage also agreed to produce the film along with producers Jeremy Davis from JD Entertainment and veteran actor-turned-producer Grant Cramer from Landafar Entertainment, in collaboration with Mike Nilon from Cage's Saturn Films. Kevin Lewis was hired as director while the cast, including Emily Tosta, Beth Grant and Ric Reitz, joined in February 2020.

After the announcement, the film received a small cult following, with many comparing it to the Five Nights at Freddy's video game series, although Parsons and Lewis denied any similarities. The custom pinball machine in the film was based on the 1982 Gottlieb table Devil's Dare. Certain changes were made during production; the title was changed from Wally's Wonderland to Willy's Wonderland due to legal issues; and original animatronic characters Douglas Dog, Pauly Penguin, Beary Bear, Pirate Pete, and Regina Rabbit were replaced with Arty Alligator, Tito Turtle, Gus Gorilla, Knighty Knight, and Cammy Chameleon, respectively.

Lewis described the film as "Pale Rider vs. Killer Klowns from Outer Space", and cites Panos Cosmatos's Beyond the Black Rainbow as an inspiration.

=== Filming ===
Principal photography began in February 2020 for a month in various parts of Atlanta, Georgia. The crew used a desolated bowling alley in the Sprayberry Crossing shopping center in East Cobb, Marietta for the fictional Willy's Wonderland family entertainment center, setting-up a huge basecamp with housing facilities for the crew members due to the COVID-19 pandemic restrictions. Special effects for the film were done by production designer Molly Coffee, whose expertise in design and fabrication with puppetry helped to create the visual movement and appearance for the eight animatronic characters.

== Music ==
Willy's Wonderland: Original Motion Picture Soundtrack

Soundtrack album by Émoi
- Released: February 12, 2021
- Genre: Soundtrack
- Length: 53:51
- Label: Filmtrax LTD
- Producer: Émoi

On February 12, 2021, Filmtrax LTD released the score soundtrack for the film composed by Émoi. Producer Grant Cramer performed a track titled "Just The Way I Roll", which appeared in the film's end credits.

All tracks are written by Émoi.

No.	Title	Length
1.	"The Birthday Song And Willy's Jingle"	0:54
2.	"Road to Hayesville"	2:06
3.	"The Janitor"	2:31
4.	"Would You Mind If I Keep You in Mind"	2:25
5.	"Face Off"	3:20
6.	"Pinball Romance"	1:19
7.	"Ozzie Ostrich"	2:21
8.	"The Bathroom From Hell"	1:55
9.	"Clap Your Hands"	0:52
10.	"Gus Gorilla"	1:27
11.	"Arty Alligator"	2:39
12.	"Siren Sara"	1:45
13.	"We're All Friends"	0:56
14.	"Super Happy Fun Room"	0:32
15.	"It Never Bothered You Before"	1:40
16.	"A Dark History"	2:44
17.	"Six Little Chickens"	0:45
18.	"The Death Anthem"	2:42
19.	"Knighty Knight"	1:45
20.	"In Town We Knew What Was Happening"	3:15
21.	"Cammy Chameleon"	3:22
22.	"Head Shoulders Knees Toes"	1:44
23.	"Tito Turtle"	0:46
24.	"Willy Weasel"	3:11
25.	"The Janitor and Liv"	1:12
26.	"Just The Way I Roll"	2:41
27.	"Willy's Wonderland"	3:02
Total length:		53:51

== Marketing ==
On January 29, 2021, to promote the film, G.O. Parsons announced on his Twitter feed that original Willy's Wonderland T-shirts identical to the staff shirt Nicolas Cage wears in the film, would be available.

== Other media ==
=== Prequel comic book series and motion comic ===
On June 25, 2021, Parsons confirmed that American Mythology Productions would release a comic book series under the same title, serving as a prequel to the film. The four issues were released from October 2021 to July 2022, and the series centers on the characters' backstories.

The comic book series was later adapted into an unofficial four-episode motion comic released in 2023, titled Willy's Wonderland Comic Series Fan Dub, with voice acting and well-known composers providing music including Cristobal Tapia de Veer, Joseph Bishara, Tyler Bates, Brian Tyler, and Charlie Clouser among others. The project was developed, directed, edited and produced by Kobe Van Bogaert. The series is hosted in its entirety on YouTube.

=== Video game adaptation ===
On October 29, 2021, a 2.5d beat 'em up based on Willy's Wonderland was announced to be launching on Android and iOS on December 15, 2021. It released on iOS January 23, 2023, to little fanfare. A few months later, it was taken down on both platforms. On June 6, 2024, it was announced that it would be re-released with updates and changes on June 13 to all major platforms.

== Release ==
Willy's Wonderland was scheduled for worldwide theatrical release on October 30, 2020, but was removed from the calendar due to the COVID-19 pandemic causing the closure of theaters across the globe. It was announced on January 15, 2021, that it would be available for digital distribution. It was eventually released through video on demand and received a limited theatrical release on February 12, 2021. Due to being delayed by the pandemic, it was released in Saudi Arabia on September 23, 2021.

=== Box office ===
Willy's Wonderland grossed $418,286 in North America and grossed $38,858 in other territories for a worldwide total of $457,144, against a budget of $5 million.

The film grossed around $97,164 in its opening day and made $107,145 over the four-day Presidents' Day weekend. The following day, it grossed $203,886, with Croatia grossing $12,734 and the UAE grossing $14,191.

=== Critical response ===
On review aggregator website Rotten Tomatoes, the film holds an approval rating of 60% based on 93 reviews, with an average rating of 5.7/10. The site's critical consensus reads: "Willy's Wonderland isn't quite as much fun as its premise would suggest—but it's still got Nicolas Cage beating the hell out of bloodthirsty animatronics, which is nice." Metacritic, which uses a weighted average, assigned the film a score of 44 out of 100, based on 14 critics, indicating "mixed or average reviews".

Variety's Owen Gleiberman wrote: "Kevin Lewis's giant-furry-funhouse-mascot slasher movie knows how preposterous it is but plays it straight". Nick De Semlyn of Empire gave the film a score of three out of five stars, concluding that, "though the dialogue and plotting are no great shakes, that commitment to the concept, combined with Cage's swaggering soda-swigger, is enough to make this a good time." IGN's Matt Fowler rated the film six out of ten, writing that "There's not enough here to score high marks, but there's cartoonish carnage aplenty and that warrants a passing grade." Anton Bitel from VODzilla.com awarded the film a score of seven out of ten, saying: "It is set in an amusement centre for children, but comes with adult doses of foul-mouthed language, sex, gore and death. Its scenarios feel a little rote, but are enlivened by the craziness that Cage brings to everything".

Kimberley Elizabeth from Nightmare on Film Street gave the film a score of 7.5/10, commenting: "Nicolas Cage['s] unique brand of kickassery is the jelly to this animatronic PB & J Horror sandwich". Alix Turner of Ready Steady Cut wrote: "Daft plot, fabulous fight scenes, teenagers in peril and plenty of gore. Sure, the film could have been better, but it didn't exactly need to be: this was thoroughly entertaining" and gave to it a rating of 3.5 on 5. Charles Barfield of The Playlist gave a similar opinion and rated the film with a "B+". Nicolás Delgadillo of DiscussingFilm.net called the film "unapologetically ridiculous" and "a bizarre hidden gem thrown into Cage's already vast and eclectic body of work".

Reviewer A. A. Dowd from The A.V. Club described the film as a "chintzy Five Nights At Freddy's mockbuster". The film ranks on Rotten Tomatoes' Best Horror Movies of 2021.

== Possible sequel ==
In an interview, G. O. Parsons stated he had an idea for a sequel if the film got enough support. In February 2021, it was announced that a sequel was being actively discussed. In February 2023, Parsons said the sequel was "trending positively".

== See also ==
- The Banana Splits Movie, a 2019 film with a similar premise revolving around a group of humans fending off against homicidal animatronics
- The Mean One, a film whose antagonist similarly resembles an innocent albeit homicidal character
- Five Nights at Freddy's, a 2023 film with a similar premise revolving around a human surviving against homicidal animatronics
  - Five Nights at Freddy’s, the video game franchise Five Nights at Freddy’s is based on, the former of which was compared with Willy’s Wonderland
- Winnie-the-Pooh: Blood and Honey, another low-budget horror film with a premise revolving around a group of humans against antagonists resembling children’s characters
  - Winnie-the-Pooh: Blood and Honey 2, the sequel to Winnie-the-Pooh: Blood and Honey
  - The Twisted Childhood Universe, the broader media franchise spawned following the success of Winnie-the-Pooh: Blood and Honey
