= I'll Remember April =

I'll Remember April may refer to:

- "I'll Remember April" (song), a 1942 popular song by Gene de Paul, lyrics by Patricia Johnston and Don Raye
- I'll Remember April (1945 film), starring Gloria Jean
- I'll Remember April (1999 film), a 1999 film by director Bob Clark
