= Grant Cramer =

American actor and producer

- Born: November 10, 1961 (age 64); Los Angeles, California, U.S.
- Occupations: Film, television actor, producer
- Years active: 1980-2012; 2021-present (acting); 2012-present (producer)
- Spouse: Olga Cramer (m. 2010)
- Children: 1
- Parents: Stuart Warren Cramer III (father); Terry Moore (mother)

Grant Cramer (born November 10, 1961) is an American actor and producer who has starred in films and on television. He is the son of actress Terry Moore and Stuart Warren Cramer III, and a great-grandson of engineer and inventor Stuart W. Cramer.

== Career ==
Cramer's first feature film role was in 1980, when he appeared in a supporting role in the horror film New Year's Evil. His first big role came in the 1984 cult comedy film Hardbodies, in which he played Scotty Palmer. His other big film was the 1988 cult classic Killer Klowns from Outer Space. Other film roles include appearances in Mach 2 (2001) and Follow the Prophet (2009).

Cramer's first television role was in the 1982 made-for-television movie Desperate Lives as a teen drug user. He starred in the daytime series The Young and the Restless as the psychotic stalker Shawn Garrett from 1984-1986. He later returned to the show in 1996 to play Adam Hunter, a love interest for Ashley Abbott.

Cramer has made guest appearances on episodes of The Facts of Life, Rags to Riches, and Murder, She Wrote.

Cramer turned his attention to writing, producing and directing, performing all three duties on the short film "Say Goodnight, Michael". The film won numerous awards, including the Grand Jury Award at the New York Independent Film and Video festival.

In 2008, he created and executive produced the VH1 series Old Skool with Terry and Gita, which aired in over 40 countries internationally.

From 2011 through 2013, Cramer was the executive vice president of Envision Entertainment, their chief creative executive on 10 movies during that span.

Cramer is the President of Landafar Entertainment, an independent film finance and production company. Films they have executive produced include Lone Survivor, And So It Goes, November Man and How to Make Love Like an Englishman (2015).

In 2021, he returned to acting, where he played a supporting role in the film Willy's Wonderland.

== Personal life ==
Cramer married his wife, Olga, in 2010. The couple have one child together, son Preston Cody Sasha Cramer, born on May 22, 2015.

== Filmography ==
As actor:

- New Year's Evil (1980)
- Hardbodies (1984)
- The Young and the Restless (1984)
- Killer Klowns from Outer Space (1988)
- Father's Day (1988)
- An Inconvenient Woman (1991)
- Hangfire (1991)
- Hail Caesar (1994)
- The Young and the Restless (1996)
- Screening (1997)
- Mach 2 (2001)
- Raptor (2001)
- The Still Life (2006)
- The Final Song (2009)
- Follow the Prophet (2009)
- Margarine Wars (2012)
- Beyond (2012)
- Willy's Wonderland (2021)

As producer:

- Freelancers (2012) ... Production Executive
- Fire with Fire ... Production Executive
- End of Watch (2012) ... Production Executive
- Empire State ... Production Executive
- The Frozen Ground (2013) ... Production Executive
- Escape Plan (2013) ... Production Executive
- 2 Guns (2013) ... Production Executive
- Lone Survivor (2013) ... Executive Producer
- And So It Goes (2014) ... Executive Producer
- The November Man (2014) ... Executive Producer
- How to Make Love Like an Englishman (2014) ... Producer, Second Unit Coordinator
- Arctic Dogs (2019) ... Executive Producer
- The War with Grandpa (2020) ...Executive Producer
- Followed (2020) ... Executive Producer
- Willy's Wonderland (2021) Producer, Second Unit Director
