= Mach 2 (film) =

2001 film by Fred Olen Ray

- Film poster
- Directed by: Fred Olen Ray
- Written by: Steve Latshaw
- Produced by: Robyn Stevens
- Starring: Brian Bosworth
- Cinematography: Thomas L. Callaway
- Edited by: Randy Carter
- Music by: Eric Wurst; David Wurst
- Distributed by: 20th Century Fox Home Entertainment
- Release dates: August 2000 (premiere): March 13, 2001 (USA); (DVD release)
- Running time: 94 minutes
- Country: United States
- Language: English

Mach 2 is a 2001 American direct-to-video action disaster thriller film directed by Fred Olen Ray.

== Plot ==
U.S. Senator Stuart Davis, running against the Vice-President, plans a trip to the Balkans to negotiate the release of American servicemen being held hostage by terrorists. Before he leaves, he receives a disk documenting evidence that the Vice-President has been trying to revive the American economy by causing a war in the Balkans. He announces his plans at Washington Dulles International Airport to show it to both sides in the hopes of ending the situation. He boards Concorde flight 209 to Paris along with some Air Force Officers and news employees.

Secret Service agents turn up unexpectedly and board the plane. Shortly after takeoff, the agents – revealed to be rogues working for the president's administration, hijack the Concorde in mid-flight. Their leader, Barry Rogers takes all the passengers hostage including Stuart, and forces him to hand over the disk in order to prevent the war being averted. In the cockpit, Barry poses as a Balkan terrorist and informs Dulles ATC control that they are armed with a nuclear device and threaten to crash the Concorde into Paris.

Air Force Officer Jack Tyree is also led to the flight deck where Stuart is held hostage. He overpowers one of Barry's men, accidentally shooting the co-pilot in the process. Jack takes over, but another agent shoots Captain Roman and removes Jack from the flight deck. Having previously descended to 10,000 feet, Barry and his remaining henchman parachute off the plane, after revealing that the nuclear bomb is a hoax. They land in a mountainous terrain in northern France, and drive off in a getaway car.

However, two French Secret Service Agents have overheard the hijacking and chase the duo along the road towards a pre-prepared road block. Rogers sets an electromagnetic pulse bomb to destroy the car, until the officers at the roadblock fires a shell at the agents, whom plummet off a ravine to their deaths.

On the Concorde, Jack and news employee Shannon Carpenter attempt to pilot the aircraft but Jack lacks the skills of aviation and is nicknamed "washout". The aircraft's radio is damaged due to the previous fight with one of Barry's men. Since Shannon is a former mechanic, she repairs the radio and restores contact with air traffic control just in time as F-14 jets intercept the aircraft on orders to shoot it down before it reaches Paris. Because of the explosion of a nearby missile fired from the fighter, the Concorde's fuel line is torn and is leaking fuel, compromising the arrival at Paris.

The plane runs out of fuel and on instruction via Paris control, Jack manages to glide the Concorde to a successful landing with the aid of emergency breaking nets. Shannon, having hidden the actual disk in the trash, hands over the disk containing confidential files to Stuart, making it possible for the war to be averted. Jack and Shannon finally engage in a passionate kiss and the film ends, displaying the Concorde.

== Cast ==
- Brian Bosworth as Captain Jack Tyree
- Shannon Whirry as Shannon Carpenter
- Cliff Robertson as Vice President Pike
- Bruce Weitz as Phil Jefferson
- Robert Pine as Captain Roman
- Andrew Stevens as Commander Stevens
- Michael Dorn as Barry Rogers
- David Hedison as Senator Stuart Davis
- Jennifer Hammon as Gina Kendall
- John Putch as Tim Mandell
- Charles Cyphers as Harry Olson
- Ron Chaney as Captain Wallace
- Sondra Currie as Courtney Davis
- Lance Guest as Keith Dorman
- Austin Stoker as Edwards
- Jan Speck as Linda Carson
- Ai Wan as Wendy Carson
- Tom Simmons as Ted
- Clark Reiner as Vice-Presidential Aide
- Nikki Fritz as Jill
- Peter Looney as Agent George Curtis
- Grant Cramer as Agent Lyndon
- Richard Partlow as Jefferson Baker
- Richard Gabai as Co-Pilot

== Production trivia ==
The majority of the principal photography took place in the summer of 1991. The scenes of the Concorde were used from the 1979 film The Concorde ... Airport '79. The interior of the Concorde seen in the film is vastly larger than the real aircraft, as a Boeing 747 set was used due to budgetary constraints. Moreover, the flight deck seen in the film appears to be from an Airbus A300 – noting the glass cockpit and u-shaped steering column, as Concorde has analogue instruments and an m-shaped steering column.

All the scenes of the Washington Dulles and Paris Orly airports were filmed at small aerodromes, noting the small size of their control towers.

== Reception ==
TV guide described the film as "A routine action picture of the bumpy flight variety, fueled by political conspiracy and Brian Bosworth's stoic maschismo."
