= Local Color (film) =

2006 film by George Gallo

- Theatrical release poster
- Directed by: George Gallo
- Written by: George Gallo
- Produced by: Jimmy Evangelatos; Julie Gallo; David Sosna
- Starring: Armin Mueller-Stahl; Trevor Morgan; Ray Liotta; Charles Durning; Samantha Mathis
- Cinematography: Michael Negrin
- Edited by: Malcolm Campbell
- Music by: Chris Boardman
- Distributed by: Monterey Media (U.S.)
- Release dates: April 29, 2006 (Tribeca Film Festival); September 19, 2008 (United States)
- Running time: 108 minutes
- Country: United States
- Language: English

Local Color is a 2006 American drama film, written and directed by George Gallo and starring Armin Mueller-Stahl, Ray Liotta and Trevor Morgan in the lead role. It is based on the director/writer's experience when he was 18. The character of Nicholai Seroff was based on George Cherepov, to whom Gallo had been an apprentice in the 1970s.

== Plot ==
In 1974, John Talia is a teenager who aspires to be a painter, despite the fact that his father disapproves. Talia manages to meet Nicholai Seroff, an elderly Russian expatriate impressionist painter who had been quite successful before the modern art movement threw realism into disrepute.

Seroff is bitter and has not painted for years. Gradually, Talia attempts to befriend the elderly artist, and despite many rebuffs, finally succeeds. Seroff invites him to spend the summer with him in his summer house in the countryside. Talia's father is skeptical, and suspicious of the elder man's motives, but Talia goes anyway.

During the first weeks, Seroff seems to be using Talia as an unpaid laborer to fix up his house, however it becomes clear that the Russian is sharing nuggets of wisdom about life and art. Eventually Seroff shows him how to paint, and how to capture a shared experience. When Talia comes home at the end of the summer, Seroff goes to Talia's house first, and manages to win over his father.

Some years later, when Seroff dies, he leaves many of his paintings to Talia, who happily remembers seeing Seroff finally painting again.

== Cast ==
- Trevor Morgan as John Talia Jr.
- Armin Mueller-Stahl as Nicholai Seroff
- Ray Liotta as John Talia Sr.
- Charles Durning as Yammi
- Samantha Mathis as Carla
- Ron Perlman as Curtis Sunday
- Diana Scarwid as Edith Talia
- Julie Lott as Sandra Sunday
- Tom Adams as grey artist
- Taso Papadakis as metal artist
- David Sosna as college dean
- Nancy Casemore as Mrs. Huntington-Quail
- David Sheftell as Mikey
- Timothy Velasquez as nasty kid
- Melissa Allman as gallery girl
- Jimmy Evangelatos as waiter
- Michael Negrin as John (50 years old)

== Production ==
Gallo also painted all of the oil paintings in this movie, having "cleaned out his whole garage" of his paintings. In particular, the paintings that John (Trevor Morgan) showed to Seroff (Armin Mueller-Stahl) when asking him for advice in the beginning of the movie were the exact paintings that Gallo had shown to Cherepov as a teenager.

Although the film was based in New York and Pennsylvania, the film was actually shot in various locations in Louisiana in and around New Orleans, Covington and Baton Rouge. Production began in July 2005. The company stayed in two different hotels to avoid delays driving from New Orleans to a nearby location at the end of the schedule and were thus able to wrap production only 8 days before Hurricane Katrina without interruption.

== Reception ==
On the review aggregator website Rotten Tomatoes, 39% of 18 critics' reviews are positive.
