= George Cherepov =

Lithuanian-American painter

- Born: 1909; Lithuania
- Died: 1987 (aged 77–78); Pennsylvania, United States
- Education: Studied with Konstantin Wisotsky and Alexis Hansen
- Known for: Oil painting

George Cherepov (1909–1987) was a painter of Russian origin known for his use of color in a wide variety of subjects, including landscapes, seascapes, and still lifes. He is known especially for his oil paintings of New England's autumn colors.

== Life ==
George Cherepov was born in Lithuania in 1909. He studied painting with Konstantin Wisotsky in Riga and Alexis Hansen in Dubrovnik. Thereafter, he travelled and exhibited in many galleries and museums of central Europe. In 1952 he emigrated to the United States. He established himself through numerous shows in the New York area, including ten one-man shows at Grand Central Art Galleries. He conducted courses on oil painting and published books on the techniques of oil painting. Cherepov died in Pennsylvania in 1987. He was married to Klara Cherepov, an artistic weaver.

The character of Nicoli Seroff (played by Armin Mueller-Stahl) in the 2006 film Local Color was based on Cherepov and his relationship with the film's writer and director George Gallo. Gallo had been an apprentice to Cherepov in the 1970s.

== Bibliography ==
- Blake, Wendon (1979), The Oilpainting Book, New York: Watson-Guptill.
- Cherepov, George (1971), Discovering Oil Painting, New York: Watson-Guptill.
