= The Diary of Preston Plummer =

- Directed by: Sean Ackerman
- Written by: Sean Ackerman
- Produced by: Sean Ackerman; Jane Kelly Kosek
- Starring: Trevor Morgan; Rumer Willis; Erin Dilly; Christopher Cousins; Robert Loggia
- Cinematography: Miguel Drake-McLaughlin
- Edited by: Amanda Larson
- Music by: Christopher Brady
- Production companies: Meritage Pictures; Wonder Entertainment
- Release dates: March 5, 2012 (Miami); April 20, 2012 (limited)
- Running time: 82 minutes
- Country: United States
- Language: English

The Diary of Preston Plummer is a 2012 American drama film written and directed by Sean Ackerman and starring Trevor Morgan, Rumer Willis, Erin Dilly, Christopher Cousins and Robert Loggia.

== Cast ==
- Trevor Morgan as Preston Plummer
- Rumer Willis as Kate Cather
- Erin Dilly as Emily Cather
- Christopher Cousins as Walter Cather
- Robert Loggia as John Percy

== Reception ==
Tracy Moore of Common Sense Media gave the film three stars out of five.
