= Family Plan (1997 film) =

- DVD cover
- Directed by: Fred Gerber
- Written by: Paul Bernbaum
- Produced by: Paul Bernbaum; Abby Singer
- Starring: Leslie Nielsen; Judge Reinhold
- Cinematography: John Fleckenstein
- Edited by: David Rawlins; George Roulston
- Music by: Lee Holdridge
- Distributed by: Initial Entertainment Group
- Release date: May 30, 1997
- Running time: 95 Minutes
- Country: United States
- Language: English

Family Plan is a 1997 American comedy film directed by Fred Gerber. It stars Leslie Nielsen and Judge Reinhold. It is the second movie in which Nielsen portrayed Harry Haber, the first being 1995's Rent-a-Kid.

== Plot ==
Sol Rubins (Harry Morgan), a dying millionaire, owns a children's summer camp in Arizona, "Camp Sedona". Saul has already planned to leave the camp to his niece Julie (Emily Proctor) after he dies. Julie's fiancé Jeffrey (Judge Reinhold), upset at Sol not leaving them any dowry, wants to sell the camp to rich investors, so he transforms the camp into a prototype adult resort, "Chez Sedona", without telling Julie and invites investors for a weekend getaway, which he hopes will lead to one of them financing a permanent version of the resort. Unbeknownst to Jefferey, Harry Haber (Leslie Nielsen), after a misunderstanding about a scheduling conflict, has already planned to take the children of the Mid Valley Children Home, run by his son Cliff (Tony Rosato), to the former Camp Sedona for their annual summer getaway. The trip had initially been canceled due to Sol's impending death. However, after a confusing visit by Harry with the dying Sol and a talk with Julie after Sol's funeral, the trip has been put back in place, scheduled for the same July weekend as Jeffrey's planned Chez Sedona opening.

Meanwhile, two of the Mid Valley kids, brothers Alec and Eli Mackenzie (Trevor Morgan and Zachary Browne), recently lost their dad in a car accident and are trying to find their biological mother. According to their case files, their mother lives in Phoenix, Arizona, not far from Camp Sedona. The two brothers plan to run away while at the camp to head to Phoenix and find their mother. However, their plans hit a wall when Alec, the more rebellious of the two, is busted for some tricks by Cliff and grounded, preventing him from going on the trip.

Eli helps Alec sneak on the bus by hiding him in a large duffel bag filled with clothes.

Once the worlds of Camp and Chez Sedona collide, various shenanigans are done by the kids toward their adult campmates, often to the frustration of Jeffrey, whose investors are not fond of kids. Harry, as camp director, is oblivious to Jeffrey's frustrations and the awkwardness of the contrasting kid and adult "Sedonas" and is focused on making sure the kids have a great time. Meanwhile, with Jeffrey focused on the resort, Julie spends her downtime reconnecting with childhood friend Matt (Eddie Bowz), the camp director. Matt, in turn, spends time with the mostly shy Eli and starts looking out for him, big-brother style. Assuming that Alec is not there to protect him, the more bullying of Eli's housemates resort to pushing him around, although Alec still manages to look out for his little brother.

Things finally come to a head when Alec is finally caught after climbing a dangerous cliff to retrieve Eli's toy plane, and ends up clinging to life near the edge of the cliff. Matt rescues him, but Harry is forced to reveal Alec's whereabouts to Cliff back at the home.

That night, during a planned movie screening, Jeffery shows Julie his "sensitive side" as part of a final ploy to get her to sell the camp. Unfortunately for him, Harry had come across a prank recording the boys made earlier and put in place of the planned movie for everyone to watch. In it, a woman filmed sleeping storms off and confronts Jeffrey. Jeffrey pauses the movie several times, but each time Harry resumes it ensuring they get to the part of Jeffery's conversation about making plans for the camp behind Julie's back. This causes Julie to punch Jeffrey and finally dump him, but not before declaring the camp not for sale.

Knowing that Cliff is set to arrive that night to pick up Alec, he and Alec stow away that night in a catering service van heading to Phoenix. Julie and Matt go after them by car but don't beat them to the catering company's building. While Julie and Matt catch up with the van too late, they do manage to find a map the brothers had left behind by accident.

Julie and Matt return to the car and discover Eli and Alec hiding in the back. Having already realized their plans, Cliff, now at the camp himself, tells Julie and Matt to head to the address of the kids' mom. Harry, meanwhile, assures his worried son that Eli and Alec are in good hands.

Julie and Matt head to the address and Eli and Alec jump out of the car and run to the door. Unfortunately, the brothers discover that new owners are occupying the house. To make matters worse, none of the new residents have any knowledge of who had previously owned the house, leaving the brothers at a dead end. Heartbroken, Eli, Alec, Matt, and Julie head back for camp.

Returning to camp, Matt, having grown fond of Eli and Alec, decides to adopt them. He meets Harry at the camp office and reveals his intentions. To Matt's surprise, Cliff and Julie emerge from another room, where it is revealed that Julie also wants to adopt the boys for the same reason. Realizing he is ready for commitment and love, Matt finally proposes to the now-single Julie, and she accepts.

Preparing to depart camp, Harry helps a flustered Cliff understand that all the craziness during the trip is not as important as the fact that things ended with two children (Eli and Alec) having a home and a family. The film ends with Cliff, the kids, and the just-married Matt and Julie driving by a broken Jeffrey, fixing his own car's flat tire.

== Cast ==
- Leslie Nielsen as Harry Haber
- Judge Reinhold as Jeffrey Chase, Julie's fiancé
- Eddie Bowz as Matt Nolan
- Emily Procter as Julie Rubins, Sol's niece and Matt's wife
- Zachary Browne as Eli Mackenzie, Alec's older brother and Matt & Julie's adoptive son
- Trevor Morgan as Alec Mackenzie, Eli's younger sister and Matt & Julie's adoptive son
- Tony Rosato as Cliff Haber, Harry's son
- Harry Morgan as Sol Rubins, Julie's uncle
- Bill LeVasseur as Head Camp Counselor

== Reception ==
The German website TV Today was critical of the film and commented, "Since the hit The Naked Gun, Leslie Nielsen has been producing slapstick nonstop. With a few creative breaks he might come up with new ideas." while a similar assessment can be found at the Italian Filmtv, "Disheartening comedy in which Leslie Nielsen does nothing but repeat the clichés that made him famous, with Judge Reinhold as his sidekick. Gerber has made many TV movies, and it shows." Film Dienst stated, "Woven into the plot is the story of two half-orphans who are looking for their unknown mother in the nearby town. Family-friendly, entertaining comedy that focuses on conciliatory entertainment. Although not all the gags are successful and the comedic ammunition is quickly used up, the film still offers a nice family fairy tale." Wunschliste was more positive about the film: "The comedy with top star Leslie Nielsen ("The Naked Gun") in top form offers funny entertainment for young and old and, in addition to lots of gags and slapstick, also presents a touching family story. Judge Reinhold (“Beverly Hills Cop”) is also convincing as the unsympathetic rogue Jeffrey."
