= Off the Black =

2006 film by James Ponsoldt

- Theatrical release poster
- Directed by: James Ponsoldt
- Written by: James Ponsoldt
- Produced by: Scott Macaulay; Robin O'Hara
- Starring: Nick Nolte; Trevor Morgan; Timothy Hutton; Sally Kirkland
- Cinematography: Tim Orr
- Edited by: Sabine Hoffmann
- Music by: Claire Campbell; Alex Neville; Brian Petway
- Distributed by: THINKFilm
- Release dates: October 19, 2006 (Orlando Film Festival); December 8, 2006 (United States)
- Running time: 90 minutes
- Country: United States
- Language: English

Off the Black is a 2006 American drama film starring Nick Nolte and Trevor Morgan. It was written and directed by James Ponsoldt, who also has a small role in the film, and is his feature directorial debut.

== Plot ==
Ray Cook (Nolte) is a bitter, disconcerted high school baseball umpire and chronic alcoholic who, after a series of unusual events, crosses paths with Dave Tibbel (Morgan), a high school baseball player seeking revenge after Cook's questionable calls cost his team the most crucial game of the season. Over time, an unlikely bond forms between the mismatched pair, and Dave agrees to pose as Ray's son for the old man's forty-year high school reunion. The film is a story of two wandering lost souls, one an adolescent boy struggling (along with his younger sister, played by Sonia Feigelson) with an absent mother and a father (Timothy Hutton) who has entirely checked out, and the other an older man, who has seen the curve balls life can throw at you and continuously struck out in his struggle to be the man he wishes to be.

== Cast ==
Actor	Role
Trevor Morgan	Dave Tibbel
Nick Nolte	Ray Cook
Sonia Feigelson	Ashley Tibbel
Rosemarie DeWitt	Debra
Timothy Hutton	Mr. Tibbel
Sally Kirkland	Marianne Reynolds
Noah Fleiss	Todd Hunter
Johnathan Tchaikovsky	Paul Michaels
Michael Higgins	Al Cook

== Reception ==
Off the black received positive reviews and has a rating of 66% on Rotten Tomatoes based on 44 reviews with an average rating of 6.2 out of 10. The critical consensus states, "Nick Nolte shines in his role as an irascible high school umpire, imbuing this indie coming-of-age dramedy with heft and true-to-life warmth." Metacritic gave the film a score of 62 out of 100, based on 20 reviews.

The film only had a limited release in America and made $24,425.

== See also ==
- List of baseball films
