= Trevor Morgan (actor) =

American actor (born 1986)

- Born: Trevor John Morgan; November 26, 1986 (age 39); Chicago, Illinois, U.S.
- Occupation: Actor
- Years active: 1997–present
- Spouse: Paulina Olszynski (m. 2024)
- Children: 1

Trevor John Morgan (born November 26, 1986) is an American actor. He has appeared in the films Family Plan, Barney's Great Adventure (based on the popular children's television series), The Sixth Sense, Genius, The Patriot, Jurassic Park III, The Glass House, A Rumor of Angels, Uncle Nino, Mean Creek, Local Color and Chasing 3000.

== Early life ==
Morgan was born in Chicago He has three older half siblings and a younger brother, actor Joey Morgan, who died in 2021. His parents are Lisa Morgan and Joe Borrasso of MbM Studios, a talent development and production company. When Morgan was five, the family relocated to Orange County, California, where Trevor appeared in various commercials. In 1997, the family moved to Los Angeles, California, so that he could pursue an acting career.

== Career ==
Morgan first appeared in several commercials for McDonald's and Cheerios and was featured on a Life cereal box. He got his first break as Alec Mackenzie in the feature film Family Plan, which led him to appear in Barney's Great Adventure. Morgan was given the lead role of Duke Cooper in I'll Remember April. His co-star Haley Joel Osment was given the lead role of Cole Sear in The Sixth Sense, while Morgan played Cole's nemesis, a pretentious young actor. After the success of The Sixth Sense, I'll Remember April was rushed to video due to Osment's role as Pee Wee Clayton. Morgan's picture was replaced by Osment's on the box for marketing purposes.

Actor/director Mel Gibson, who was looking for several child actors to play his seven children in The Patriot, saw Morgan and asked him to audition for the movie. Morgan landed the role, playing son Nathan Martin. He went on to appear in Jurassic Park III and The Glass House (2001). Among his other credits are Empire Falls, Mean Creek, Off the Black and Local Color, and the baseball flick Chasing 3000.

Morgan appeared on the NBC series ER, where he played cancer victim Scotty Anspaugh for five episodes. For this role he garnered a 1998 SAG Award along with the main cast members of the show. He also appeared on Touched by an Angel. Additional television credits include Genius (Disney Telefilms), In the Dog House (Viacom/Showtime), Fire Co. 132 (20th Century Fox), Missing Persons (ABC), and The Offspring music video for "Kristy, Are You Doing Okay?" (as a young Dexter Holland).

== Filmography ==
=== Film ===
Year	Title	Role	Notes
1997	Family Plan	Alec Mackenzie	
1998	Barney's Great Adventure	Cody Newton	
1998	In the Doghouse	Dylan Wagner	Television film
1999	I'll Remember April	Duke Cooper	
1999	The Sixth Sense	Tommy Tammisimo	
1999	Genius	Charlie Boyle / Chaz Anthony	Television film
2000	The Patriot	Nathan Martin	
2000	A Rumor of Angels	James Neubauer	
2001	Jurassic Park III	Eric Kirby	
2001	The Glass House	Rhett Baker	
2002	The Rookie	Young Jimmy	Uncredited
2003	Uncle Nino	Bobby Micelli	
2004	Mean Creek	Rocky Merrick	
2005	The Prize Winner of Defiance, Ohio	Bruce Ryan at 16 years old	
2006	Local Color	John Talia Jr.	
2006	Off the Black	Dave Tibbel	
2008	My Mom's New Boyfriend	Eddie	
2008	Sanctuary	Colin Hanson	
2009	Fault Line		
2010	Brotherhood	Adam	
2010	Beneath the Dark	Jason	
2007	Chasing 3000	Mickey	
2010	The Haymaker	Davis	Short film
2011	Vampire	Renfield	
2011	Lodge Lake	Alec	Short film
2011	Munger Road	Corey LaFayve	
2012	The Diary of Preston Plummer	Preston Plummer	
2013	Abducted	Dave Roberts	
2013	McCanick	Louis	
2014	The Grounds	Calvin	
2014	Buttwhistle	Ogden Confer	
2015	Magic Hour	Ray	
2016	The Chaplain	Daniel	Short film
2016	The Grounds	Calvin	
2018	Concrete Kids	Arthur	

=== Television ===
Year	Title	Role	Notes
1997	The Pretender	Kid	Episode: "Prison Story"
1997	Baywatch	Timmy	Episode: "Life Guardian"
1997	Touched by an Angel	Stevie Sanders	Episode: "An Angel by Any Other Name"
1998	ER	Scott Anspaugh	5 episodes
2005	CSI: Miami	Patrick Brookner	Episode: "Cop Killer"
2005	Empire Falls	Zack Minty	Miniseries
2005	Reno 911!	School guy #2	Episode: "The Prefect of Wanganui"
2007	Law & Order: Criminal Intent	Donny Carlson	Episode: "Untethered"
2009	Mental	Billy Bauer	Episode: "Do Over"
2010	Ghost Whisperer	Danny Seitz	Episode: "Blood Money"
2011	The Defenders	Mike	Episode: "Nevada v. Wayne"
2013	Perception	Jimmy Miles	Episode: "Neuropositive"
2018	Faith Under Fire	Michael Hill	Television film

== Awards and nominations ==
Year	Award	Category	Title of work	Medium	Result
1999	Young Artist Awards	Best Performance in a TV Drama Series - Supporting Young Actor	ER	Television	Nominated
2000	Teen Choice Award	Film - Choice Sleazebag	The Sixth Sense	Film	Nominated
2000	Young Artist Awards	Best Performance in a TV Movie or Pilot - Leading Young Actor	Genius	Film	Nominated
2001	Young Artist Awards	Best Ensemble in a Feature Film	The Patriot	Film	Nominated
2002	Young Artist Awards	Best Performance in a Feature Film - Leading Young Actor	The Glass House	Film	Nominated
2005	Independent Spirit Awards	Special Distinction Award	Mean Creek	Film	Won
2006	Ft. Lauderdale International Film Festival	Star on the Horizon	Local Color	Film	Won
2011	Action On Film International Film Festival	Best Actor	The Haymaker	Film	Nominated
