= The Third Nail =

- Official poster
- Directed by: Kevin Lewis
- Written by: Kevin Lewis; Huntley Ritter
- Produced by: Jonathan Bross; Lisette Bross; Steve Bulzoni; Ann Luly; Huntley Ritter; David Shoshan; David Tillman
- Starring: Huntley Ritter; Krista Allen; Charles S. Dutton; Chloë Grace Moretz
- Cinematography: Blake T. Evans
- Edited by: Liza Cardinale
- Music by: Penka Kouneva
- Production companies: Luly Productions Inc. Stafford Film Corp. Stafford Films; Velvet Steamroller Entertainment
- Distributed by: Peacock Films
- Release date: February 8, 2008 (United States)
- Running time: 91 minutes
- Country: United States
- Language: English
- Budget: $5,000,000

The Third Nail is a drama crime film directed by Kevin Lewis and starring Huntley Ritter, Krista Allen, Charles S. Dutton and Chloë Grace Moretz. It was released on February 8, 2008.

== Plot ==
A young man is erroneously sentenced to life in prison for killing two children. He is released after DNA evidence proves his innocence. After his release, a vengeful prison gang abducts and claims to murder his daughter.

== Cast ==
- Huntley Ritter as Trey Deonte
- Krista Allen as Hannah
- Charles S. Dutton as Sydney Washington
- Chloë Grace Moretz as Hailey Deonte
- Jake Muxworthy as Cory Hall
- Lisette Bross as Special Agent Jamison
- Kirsty Hinchcliffe as Kristie Deonte
- Robin Raven as Dana
