= The Glass House (2001 film) =

2001 film directed by Daniel Sackheim

- Theatrical release poster
- Directed by: Daniel Sackheim
- Written by: Wesley Strick
- Produced by: Neal H. Moritz
- Starring: Leelee Sobieski; Diane Lane; Stellan Skarsgård; Bruce Dern
- Cinematography: Alar Kivilo
- Edited by: Howard E. Smith
- Music by: Christopher Young
- Production companies: Columbia Pictures; Original Film
- Distributed by: Sony Pictures Releasing
- Release date: September 14, 2001 (United States)
- Running time: 106 minutes
- Country: United States
- Language: English
- Budget: $22 million
- Box office: $23.6 million

The Glass House is a 2001 American crime thriller film directed by Daniel Sackheim and written by Wesley Strick. The film stars Leelee Sobieski, Diane Lane, Stellan Skarsgård, Bruce Dern, Kathy Baker, Trevor Morgan, and Chris Noth. The film follows two orphan siblings who go to live with friends of their parents as the older sibling starts to become suspicious of the family friends' patriarch.

The Glass House was theatrically released in the United States on September 14, 2001, coinciding with the September 11 attacks (in fact, for many film critics it was the first movie they saw after returning to work). The film received generally negative reviews from critics and grossed nearly $24 million worldwide against its $22 million budget.

== Plot ==
Teenager Ruby Baker and her little brother, Rhett, lose their parents suddenly in a car accident and are placed under the guardianship of family friends and former neighbors, Terry and Erin Glass. Erin is a respected physician and Terry runs a high-end car dealership; they live in a large glass house in Malibu.

While the siblings are initially happy with the large house, they are troubled to find that they have to share a room and have been switched from private to public school. Terry and Erin buy Rhett expensive video game consoles, even though his and Ruby's parents objected to him playing video games. Ruby soon becomes uncomfortable with Terry, feeling that he is showing sexual interest in her, and with Erin, who scolds Ruby for having a bad attitude after listening in on her call with a friend. She also witnesses Erin injecting herself with pharmaceuticals, but is told that Erin has diabetes.

Ruby expresses concerns to her family's estate lawyer, who is skeptical but sends a social worker to check the children's living conditions. When the social worker arrives Ruby is shocked to see that Terry and Erin have arranged for her and Rhett to now have separate rooms, and Rhett appears to have been coached on what to say. Ruby also discovers a post card from her uncle Jack in the trash, as well as a letter from a private school, indicating that the Glasses unregistered the siblings and pocketed the $30,000+ tuition.

Ruby overhears Terry and Erin discussing their money problems: Terry is in debt to loan sharks and Erin has been sustaining her addiction to prescription drugs through her job via fraud. She begins to suspect that her guardians are after the children's $4 million trust fund, and discovers that her parents were driving a car belonging to Terry when they were killed.

Terry tries to obtain more money from the children's trust fund to pay for their schooling, but finds that Ruby has faxed the bank a copy of the letter showing he withdrew them from the school and was refunded the tuition. Ruby finds evidence that the Glasses plan to send her away. Worried for Rhett, she attempts to escape with her little brother but is caught and returned to Terry and Erin, who drug her.

The Glasses continue drugging Ruby for several weeks, and plan to stage an overdose. Erin reluctantly agrees, but her addiction is exposed and she is confronted at work by her boss and loses her job and license. Overwhelmed with guilt, she commits suicide. Ruby wakes and discovers Erin's body lying right next to her. Ruby tries to hide with her brother but Terry finds them and locks them in the basement, where they notice that Terry got the car out of the garage without showing that he sabotaged it. He pretends to pass out drunk to lure them into another escape attempt in the car. The plan nearly works, but Ruby is suspicious and they hide as the estate lawyer comes by to tell Terry his guardianship is under investigation.

The loan sharks appear, kill the lawyer and abduct Terry. To force them to use the sabotaged car, Ruby punctures the tires of the other car. The loan sharks are killed in an accident, but Terry survives. The siblings flee on foot and are picked up by a police officer. Coming across the accident scene, the officer stops to investigate. Terry attacks the officer and attempts to harm the siblings, but Ruby uses the officer's squad car to speed into Terry, killing him.

Months later, the siblings now live with their uncle and place flowers at their parents' grave.

== Cast ==
- Leelee Sobieski as Ruby Baker
- Diane Lane as Dr. Erin Glass
- Stellan Skarsgård as Terrence "Terry" Glass
- Bruce Dern as Alvin Begleiter
- Kathy Baker as Nancy Ryan
- Trevor Morgan as Rhett Baker
- Chris Noth as Jack Avery
- Michael O'Keefe as David Baker
- Rita Wilson as Grace Avery-Baker
- Vyto Ruginis as Don
- Gavin O'Connor as Whitey
- Carly Pope as Tasha
- China Jesusita Shavers as E.B.
- Agnes Bruckner as Zoe
- Michael Paul Chan as Mr. Kim
- Rachel Wilson as Hannah
- Rutanya Alda as vice principal
- John Billingsley as a driving instructor
- Julia Vera as Vicki
- Shelby Roberts as high school girl #1
- Michele Nordin as Teen Queen

== Release ==
=== Home media ===
The Glass House was released on VHS and DVD on January 2, 2002. A Blu-ray version of the film has yet to be released in the United States. It finally debuted on the Blu-ray format for the first time on October 22, 2021, in Germany in a Blu-ray and DVD combo pack by Just Bridge Entertainment. The original cut of the film was reported to be 180 minutes long, with 74 minutes of footage missing from the theatrical cut. Kip Pardue was Leelee Sobieski's love interest in the original cut, though all of his scenes ended up on the cutting room floor. Of all the deleted footage, only two scenes managed to survive. They are included on the DVD as deleted scenes (listed below):

- After Ruby faints when she finds the cops at her house, she wakes up the next morning believing her parents' accident was only a nightmare. When she heads downstairs, the neighbors are there to tell her it was not. Ruby sits at the table and cries as the camera slowly pans away from her, as Rhett is told off-screen and runs away in devastation.
- Ruby and Rhett are seen at their parents' funeral burying their ashes at the cemetery.

There is also one scene in the trailer showing Ruby furiously ripping posters off her room's wall, which does not appear in the final product.

Because of the film's critical and financial failure, Columbia Pictures had little interest in keeping unused footage and the missing 74 minutes of footage have since been considered lost.

== Reception ==
=== Box office ===
The Glass House opened at number two in its opening weekend at the US box office, behind Hardball, in which Diane Lane also stars. The Glass House grossed $18.1 million domestically and $5.4 million internationally, grossing a total of $23.6 million.

=== Critical response ===
On Rotten Tomatoes, 21% of the 86 surveyed critics reviews were positive. The average rating was 4.23/10, and the consensus is: "Due to obvious plot twists and foreshadowing, The Glass House fails to thrill. By the end, it degenerates into ludicrousness." On Metacritic it has a weighted average score of 34 out of 100, based on 17 critics, indicating "generally unfavorable" reviews. Audiences polled by CinemaScore gave it an average grade of "B" on an A+ to F scale.

Roger Ebert rated The Glass House two out of four stars and criticized the film's script. Writing for The New York Times, A. O. Scott called it unintentionally funny. Robert Koehler of Variety also called the film unintentionally funny and questioned why so many talented actors signed on to a poor script. Edward Guthmann of the San Francisco Chronicle criticized the film's violence and the timing of the release, which coincided with the September 11 attacks (in fact, for many film critics it was the first movie they saw after returning to work). In a more positive review, USA Today's Claudia Puig rated the film two out of four stars, calling it "eerily engrossing".

== Sequel ==
A direct-to-video sequel was released in 2006. It did not feature any of the characters of the original film and did not take place in the same house.
