= New Year's Evil (film) =

- Theatrical release poster
- Directed by: Emmett Alston
- Screenplay by: Leonard Neubauer
- Story by: Emmett Alston; Leonard Neubauer
- Produced by: Yoram Globus; Menahem Golan
- Starring: Roz Kelly; Kip Niven; Grant Cramer; Chris Wallace
- Cinematography: Edward Thomas
- Edited by: Dick Brummer
- Music by: Laurin Rinder; W. Michael Lewis; Shadow; Made in Japan
- Production company: Cannon Group
- Distributed by: Cannon Film Distributors
- Release date: December 19, 1980
- Running time: 85 minutes
- Country: United States
- Language: English
- Budget: $500,000

New Year's Evil is a 1980 American slasher film directed by Emmett Alston, and starring Kip Niven, Roz Kelly, and Chris Wallace. The plot follows a Los Angeles punk rock and new wave show host who receives a series of phone calls during a televised New Year's Eve bash from a killer warning of impending murders that he plans to exact as the New Year dawns on each time zone.

== Plot ==
One New Year's Eve, popular punk rock/new wave disc jockey Diane Sullivan (known as "Blaze" among her fans) is hosting a late-night countdown celebration, televised live from a Hollywood hotel and simulcast on local radio. All is going well until Diane receives a phone call from an odd-sounding stranger, who claims his name is Evil. He announces his intention to murder one "naughty girl" at the stroke of midnight in each US time zone; he warns that Diane, located in the Pacific Time Zone, will be the last victim. Meanwhile, Diane's son Derek arrives at the studio, but is mostly ignored by his mother; he begins behaving erratically throughout the night as he watches the show on TV.

The studio crew takes safety measures and heightens security, but a string of murders begins to occur across Los Angeles; a nurse at a sanitarium is found dead shortly after midnight strikes in the Eastern Time Zone, and two women are found dead near a liquor store after midnight in the Central Time Zone. The killer uses a radio/cassette recorder to tape the sounds of his victims as he murders them and calls back the station each time, replaying the tapes over the phone to prove that he is serious.

While the killer searches for a victim to kill at the stroke of midnight in the Mountain Time Zone, he inadvertently angers a gang of bikers, who chase him into a drive-in theater. He murders one of the bikers, steals a couple's car to avoid being recognized, and drives off with the girl still in the backseat, intending to make her his next victim, but she manages to escape.

Eventually, the killer manages to sneak into the hotel, which by now has been locked down by the police. It is revealed that the killer is Diane's husband, Richard, who was previously thought to be too busy to attend. After knocking Diane out, he castigates her over her treatment of their son, perceiving her and other women's treatment of him as a slight on his character. Richard tells his wife that he hates women. He reveals his intention to kill her by chaining her to an elevator and forcing it to ride "all the way up, then all the way down," having hacked the elevator controls. While he is doing this, the police, alerted to his presence, locate him. A brief firefight ensues, and the elevator controls are damaged, stopping the elevator and saving Diane. Richard flees to the rooftop, putting on the mask he had used to conceal himself while entering the building. Cornered by the police, he proceeds to jump to his death; a devastated Derek weeps over his body.

The injured Diane is loaded into an ambulance, but Derek is revealed to be the driver, having taken his dead father's mask and murdered the real driver. The ambulance drives off, leaving Diane's fate unknown, as a radio announcer in Honolulu is heard announcing the stroke of midnight in the Hawaii–Aleutian Time Zone.

== Cast ==
- Roz Kelly as Diane "Blaze" Sullivan
- Kip Niven as Richard Sullivan
- Chris Wallace as Lieutenant Ed Clayton
- Grant Cramer as Derek Sullivan
- Louisa Moritz as Sally
- Jed Mills as Ernie Moffet
- Taaffe O'Connell as Jane
- Jon Greene as Sergeant Greene
- Teri Copley as Teenage Girl
- Anita Crane as Lisa
- Jennie Anderson as Nurse Robbie
- Alicia Dhanifu as Yvonne
- Wendy-Sue Rosloff as Make-up Girl
- John London as Floor Manager
- John Alderman as Doctor Reed
- Michael Frost as Larry
- Richard E. Kalk as Crime Scene Investigator
- Clifford White as Rock Group 'Shadow'
- John Pakalenka as Rock Group 'Shadow'
- Ray Leonard as Rock Group 'Shadow'
- Richard Miller as Rock Group 'Shadow'
- Anthony Fried as Rock Group 'Made in Japan'
- Barry Paul as Rock Group 'Made in Japan'
- Bob Asea as Rock Group 'Made in Japan'
- David Codling as Rock Group 'Made in Japan'
- Teddy Scalise as Rock Group 'Made in Japan'

== Production ==
The Cannon Group had a waiver to make the film during the 1980 actors strike. Kip Niven was cast in the role of Richard Sullivan, of which he commented: "I've played bad guys before—like one of the three vigilante motorcycle cops in Clint Eastwood's Magnum Force—but this movie gave me my first leading part and the first sustained villain role that lets me pull the stops out... I could work while many others couldn't."

For many cast and crew members, New Year's Evil was their first feature film: Niven, Chris Wallace, Grant Cramer, Thomas E. Ackerman, Teri Copley, Taaffe O'Connell, and Julie Purcell.

Shadow, a long-haired touring rock band from Kennewick, Washington heard about a casting call for a new wave punk band to play live in a film, cut their hair and auditioned, landing the role of the featured band, out of fifty bands.

=== Filming ===
Principal photography mainly took place in and around Los Angeles, California. The shoot began in Los Angeles, on October 15, 1980 and was completed in 18 days, on time for the film to release two months later for the New Year's holiday. According to Thomas E. Ackerman, Director of Photography, they were "using one of the last Cinemobile production vans in which all camera, lighting, and grip equipment was compartmentalized on a single vehicle, with an on-board generator...one Brute arc...my only 'big gun' for night exteriors, along with a couple of Maxi-brutes and four big-eye 10ks...In fact, it is amazing what you can accomplish with very little."

The end credits give "Special Thanks to Bill 'Godfather of Rock and Roll' Gazzarri."

== Themes ==
The motivation for the villain in New Year's Evil, similar to other slasher films, is revenge. Ebert said the film "has music as its gimmick." Chuck Blystone for The Pantagraph contends "If the movie does have a message, it is that violence begets violence".

Film scholar John Kenneth Muir notes Sullivan is "squarely in the Norman Bates mold; someone driven to violence by his family relationships," citing the killer's incantation, "You've castrated me. And that is not nice."

== Release ==
New Year's Evil was theatrically released in the United States on December 19, 1980, by Cannon Film Distributors. It screened theatrically throughout the US and UK through 1983 then rarely again until 2008, most prominently at Quentin Tarantino's New Beverly Cinema.

Beginning in 1983, New Year's Evil played on Elvira's Movie Macabre.

=== Home media ===
New Year's Evil was released on DVD through on-demand pressings from Metro-Goldwyn-Mayer's Limited Edition Collection on June 28, 2012. Scream Factory, a subsidiary of Shout! Factory, released the film on Blu-ray on February 24, 2015.

== Reception ==
=== Contemporary ===
Bill Cosford for the Miami Herald described it as among the "knife-in-the-night genre" using a rock-concert backdrop featuring high-decibel "new-wave" bands saying "this music and its strange milieu is used to nice effect, punching up a wheezy plot."

On the review aggregator website Rotten Tomatoes, New Year's Evil has an approval rating of 25% based on 8 reviews, with an average rating of 3.5/10. On Metacritic the film has a weighted average score of 33 out of 100, based on 4 critics, indicating "generally unfavorable reviews". Roger Ebert of the Chicago Sun-Times gave the film a 1½ and wrote, "New Year's Evil is an endangered species - a plain, old-fashioned, gory thriller. It is not very good. It is sometimes unpleasantly bloody. The plot is dumb and the twist at the end has been borrowed from hundreds if not thousands of other movies. But as thrillers go these days, New Year's Evil is a throwback to an older and simpler tradition, one that flourished way back in the dimly remembered past, before 1978". Gene Siskel gave the film zero stars out of four, calling it "a hideously ugly motion picture". Variety wrote: "The true horror of New Year's Evil is the endless musical numbers by punk rockers and shots of their dancing fans. Amongst that, the bloody killings seem a welcome relief".

Chuck Blystone for The Pantagraph while commenting on the "offensive qualities" of "Slash-'em up films" contended, "While it is classier than the norm [it was] yet another attempt to break from that mold [that] generally maintains a higher standard [with] one marvelous shock scene...so well done it compares favorably to similar heartstoppers in Jaws".

=== Retrospective ===
Jerry Bokamper of The Dallas Morning News opined it "is of minor cultural curiosity on two points. Its style sense represents a queasy turn-of-the-'80s synthesis of disco and punk. Safety-pinned cheeks and shocking orange blush coexist with feathered perms and turquoise Qiana knit dresses."

Jesse Hassenger of GQ magazine included it in his list of "Exactly 13 Great New Year's Eve Movies" calling it "an unusual hybrid of ridiculous-gimmick and serial-killer thriller slasher" declaring "1980's quickie oddity New Year's Evil... wins the token holiday-themed slasher spot" while describing the live footage and accompanying neon lighting as giving the movie an extra jolt of novelty and saying "it's not exactly terrifying, but it's entertaining perverse and has genuine holiday atmosphere, giving a Dick Clark-style TV broadcast a menacing, purgatorial feel that now doubles as a time capsule" adding "the theme song by Shadow rips."

Among retrospective reviews, Dread Central's Matt Serafini concluded: "This isn't worth your time if you're looking for a horror film to deliver in scares or suspense, but as a late night horror fix, it's ideal. What New Year's Evil lacks in scares it makes up for in pure entertainment. And really, that's all you can ask for".

December 2023, in a list of top holiday horror and slasher genre movies, Drew Tinnin of DreadCentral called it an "obvious attempt to cash in on the new slasher craze sweeping across the nation" and "a weirdly engaging madcap murder mystery seething with 80s punk rock revelry" saying "Terror Train is the clear contender as the most recognized NYE shocker. But...it's time to ring in the new year with Emmett Alston's 1980 New Wave slasher New Year's Evil."

Jake Dee writing for The BLACK SHEEP column of Joblo.com debated:

extremely overlooked in the context of standalone slasher flicks of the early 80s" suffering the misfortune of getting lost in the ungodly spate of post-HALLOWEEN imitators and cheaply made slasher derivations that flooded the market at that time saying the film bucks convention in more ways than it clings to it with a kickass soundtrack full of late 70s shredders, a hilarious middle-section car-ride, and a drolly assorted death-stroke every dozen minutes or so making it harder to understand why NEW YEAR'S EVIL was so summarily panned to begin with and claiming the film rises above many to most (meritorious)!

Peter Normanton in the The Mammoth Book of Slasher Movies writes, "Alston's low-budget film certainly entertained as it juxtaposed an eighties rock score with a series of contrived killings, played out to the darkest of unintentional comedy."

== Soundtrack and theme song ==
"New Year's Evil"

Single by Shadow
- B-side: "Simon Bar Sinister"
- Released: 1980
- Studio: Salty Dog Recording
- Genre: Punk rock; new wave; heavy metal; pop metal
- Length: 2:35
- Label: Cannon Records, Metro-Goldwyn-Mayer Music
- Songwriters: Roxanne Seeman; Eddie del Barrio
- Producers: W. Michael Lewis; Laurin Rinder

Roger Ebert explained "The movie takes place on New Year's Eve, during a national TV show obviously inspired by "Midnight Special". The hostess (Roz Kelly) is taking votes over the air for the new wave song of the year".

The New Year's Evil soundtrack comprised rock songs performed live by the real bands Shadow and Made in Japan and an electronic music score with Moog synthesizer composed by W. Michael Lewis and Laurin Rinder, who are credited with producing the live recording of the movie's main title song of the same name, which plays over the opening and closing credits and once during the film.

The song was written by Roxanne Seeman and Eddie del Barrio, who responded to a spec call for an original title and theme song to be played live by a punk band being featured in the film. Requests for a song were sent to several writers by the music supervisor, Rex Devereaux. Del Barrio and Seeman submitted their original song, "New Year's Evil". Del Barrio wrote chords and melody on a synthesizer and gave a rough mixdown to Seeman to write the lyrics. The final demo recording with Seeman's lyrics was sung by session singer Gary Falcone, recorded on del Barrio's 4-track machine. Seeman wrote lyrics to visually reflect the storyline:

Shining like the light that hits the knife at the stroke of midnight.

Quiet but so bright my heartbeat swells, oh can't you tell I'm in a fever Tell me will it be sweet New Year's Eve or do I fear a New Year's Evil

=== Background ===
Shadow was a Seattle rock band who had been touring across the US and British Columbia non-stop for six years when they were spotted by a film scout playing in a club in Los Angeles. Ray Leonard was approached for the audition.

The lineup of the band appearing in the film comprised Cliff White on guitar, Ray Leonard (who changed his name to Ray Mega for the movie release) on bass, David Kesterson vocals, Art Bennett on drums, and J.P Pakalenka, vocals and guitar.

Cliff White, guitar player explained "They were really searching for a punk-band but liked our original music and thought it would fit in the movie."

The filmmakers wanted the sound of a raw, live performance for the live event in the movie during which Shadow performed on-camera. Microphones were set up at Salty Dog Recording with W. Michael Lewis and Laurin Rinder producing. The band set up their equipment, especially excited about having Rick Hart, who had worked with Pink Floyd, as their engineer, recording the songs as they were playing them. There was no overdubbing or effect. If someone made a mistake, the song was recorded over again, from scratch.

For the soundtrack album release, the band was promised they could re-record the songs with proper production:

"The release of the 45 was a complete surprise to us. We were not informed that they were going to release it to radio stations all over the country. When our booking agency told us about the release, we were pissed off beyond belief…Later on, we were glad they released the 45, as Cannon Records soon went out of business and we would have ended up with nothing.” a.m. to 1 p.m., for three days."

The main title track "New Year's Evil" by Shadow, and "The Cooler" by Made in Japan were pressed as 7" Vinyl 45rpm promotional singles and sent to 500 radio stations throughout the US. A full soundtrack record was announced in the closing credits of the film and on the original poster, but remained unreleased. In March 2020, MGM released the main title song "New Year's Evil" on digital streaming platforms.

=== Track listing ===
No.	Title	Writer(s)	Performer(s)	Length
1.	"New Year's Evil"	Roxanne Seeman, Eduardo del Barrio	Shadow	2:35
2.	"When I Wake Up"	John Pakalenka	Shadow
3.	"Simon Bar Sinister"	Music by Clifford White, Lyric by Ray Mega	Shadow	2:50
4.	"Temper Tantrum"	Ray Mega	Shadow
5.	"Headwind"	Clifford White	Shadow
6.	"Cold Hearted Lover"	Clifford White	Shadow
7.	"Auld Lang Syne"	Uncredited
8.	"Dumb Blondes"	Anthony H. Fried	Made in Japan
9.	"The Cooler"	Anthony H. Fried	Made in Japan	2:34
10.	"Suicide Ways"	Lyrics by Anthony H. Fried, Music by David Stuart Codling	Made in Japan	2:48

=== Critical reception ===
New Year's Evil has become a cult horror film with a preponderance of podcasts and reviews of the film, the song "New Year's Evil" and the music soundtrack:

Dread Central wrote: "Much of the music comes from an actual band named Shadow. The odd thing about Shadow is that their music sounds far more like a Seventies metal band than the Eighties punk rock and new wave the film promotes. Ah, who cares? It's 1980 and the top act on a New Year's countdown show isn't Manilow, The Gap Band, or The Oak Ridge Boys. "New Year's Evil" by Shadow it is".

TheDailyDot wrote: "First off, this movie features the best New Year's Eve song ever made. Like the opening to Friday the 13th Part III, it's just one of those rare original recordings for low-budget horror film that's a complete gem, and it should be an American staple of New Year's Eve celebrations". James Jay Edwards, writing for the website Film Fracture, commented:

Of course, no rock and roll horror movie is complete without the music. The rock in New Year's Evil is supplied by two very real bands – Made in Japan and Shadow. Neither could really be called new wave or punk bands (Made in Japan is more of a The Knack-y power pop band and Shadow borders on 70's heavy metal), but both are obviously from the time period in which the film takes place. The theme song, done by Shadow and appropriately called "New Year's Evil", is incredibly infectious and plays over both the opening and closing credits as well as once during the course of the film. As if the song wasn't catchy enough, hearing it three times in ninety minutes means that there is no way that this song will not get stuck in the viewer's head. The incidental and mood music is fairly typical Moog synthesizer suspense and stinger fare, but it works well in the context of the new wave slasher film. Between the rock and roll soundtrack and the electronic music score, New Year's Evil's music is one of the more memorable elements of the film.

== Sources ==
- Frank, Catherine (2000). Quotations for All Occasions. New York City, New York: Columbia University Press. doi:10.7312/fran11290-026. ISBN 978-0-231-50483-6.
- Muir, John Kenneth (2011). Horror Films of the 1980s. Vol. 1. Jefferson, North Carolina: McFarland & Company. ISBN 978-0-786-45501-0.
- Normanton, Peter (2012). The Mammoth Book of Slasher Movies. London, England: Robinson. ISBN 978-0-762-44596-7.
- Trunick, Austin (2020). The Cannon Films Guide: Volume I, 1980-1984. Orlando, Florida: BearManor Media. ISBN 978-1-62933-580-3.
