= Chris Wallace (entertainer) =

American-Australia performer

Chris Wallace is an American-Australian television producer and entertainer.

== Career ==
Wallace was born in Fort Wayne, Indiana and graduated from Ohio Wesleyan University in 1956, majoring in radio-TV-theater. He joined the Army and performed in plays while stationed in Germany, and produced programs for public television in Ohio after returning home.

He recorded "The Baby Smile" for Morningside Records in 1968, a Christmas song that was released with a Spanish language version on the b-side. He had previously written "Tide Comes In" which was recorded by Valentine Pringle. Wallace followed this with an album of children's stories titled Uncle Wiggily and his Friends, released in 1970.

His television career began as an announcer at WOSU-TV, and later WBNS-TV. In 1968 he produced the Harlem Cultural Festival TV-series for WNEW-TV.

He joined the cast of soap opera All My Children as police officer Mel Jacobi in 1978, and made appearances in The Incredible Hulk and Trapper John, M.D., before starring in his first major motion picture role in 1980 as Lieutenant Ed Clayton in New Year's Evil.

Wallace relocated to Australia in the 1990s, and created the musical Nothing to Wear which debuted at Arts Centre Melbourne in 1995. He became an Australian citizen the following year, and has continued performing in his own works such as two based around Mark Twain, The Mark Twain You Don't Know (2007), and Huckleberry: A Musical Adventure (2018).
