= Animatronics =

Mechatronic puppets

Animatronic figure of Charles Entertainment Cheese in operation at a Chuck E. Cheese location in Laguna Hills, California (September 14, 2017)

Video of an animatronic Tyrannosaurus at London's Natural History Museum

An animatronic is a puppet controlled via electronics to move fluently. Seen often in the entertainment business, animatronics are the modern adaptation of the automaton and have been used to portray characters in films, video games, and theme park attractions.

Animatronics are a multidisciplinary field integrating puppetry, anatomy and mechatronics. Figures can be implemented with both computer and human control, including teleoperation. Motion actuators are often used to imitate muscle movements and create realistic motions. Figures are usually encased in body shells and flexible skins made of hard or soft plastic materials and finished with colors, hair, feathers and other components to make them more lifelike. Animatronics stem from a long tradition of mechanical automata powered by hydraulics, pneumatics and clockwork.

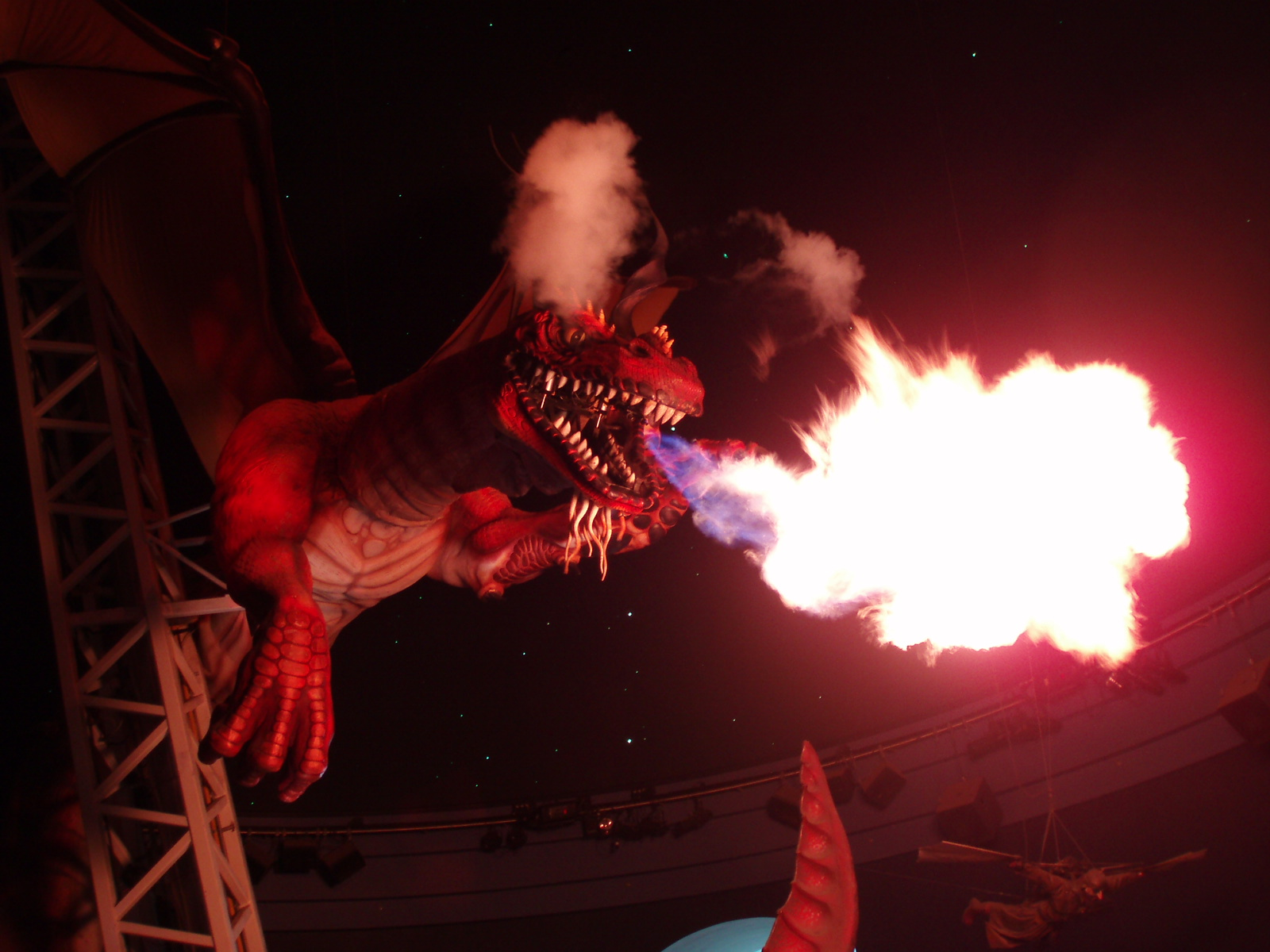
An animatronic fire-breathing dragon, suspended above the concourse at Scotiabank Theatre in West Edmonton Mall, Alberta, Canada

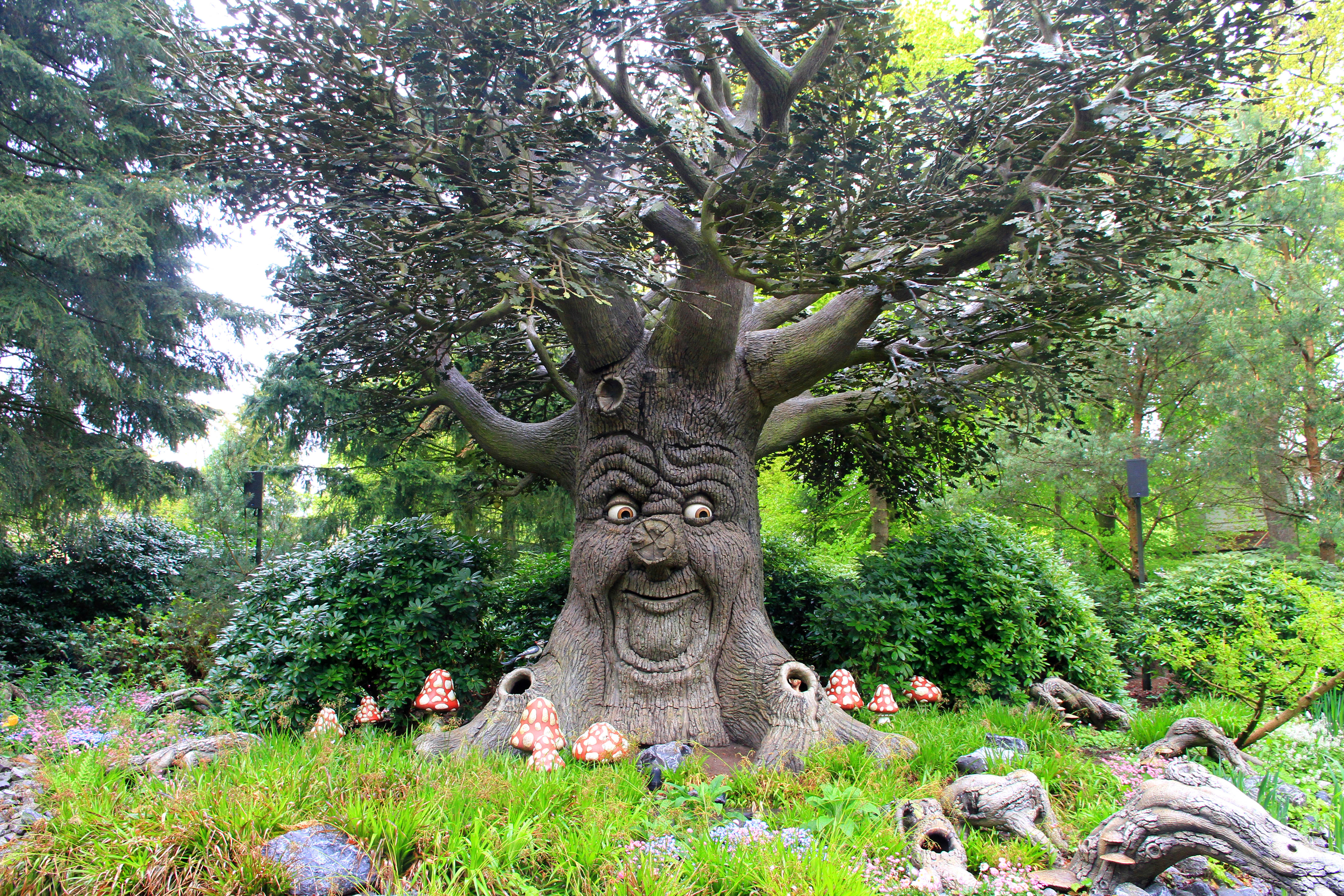
The Fairy Tale Tree in the Efteling

== History ==
Before electronics, animatronics were simply puppets made to work with clockwork. These are known today as automata. For most of human history, it has not been possible to create a moving figure resembling a person that was not directly puppeted by another person.

In the renaissance era, the first clockwork automated humanoid figures were created. These were complex with many movements, however the figures were extremely large as they contained large cam shaft mechanisms in the base. With the introduction of electricity the mechanisms to create a humanoid figure got smaller and smaller, however very few of the created figures looked human.

Animatronics have not always been known by that name. Before the term became common, they were usually referred to as robots, as at the time, robots and animatronics performed virtually the same function. Since then, robots have become known as more practical programmable machines that do not necessarily resemble living creatures. Robots (or other artificial beings) designed to convincingly resemble humans are known as androids. The term animatronics is a portmanteau of animate and electronics. The term Audio-Animatronics was coined by Walt Disney in 1961 when he started developing professional animatronics for entertainment and film.

The first audio animatronic to convincingly imitate a human without direct human puppeteering was Walt Disney's Abraham Lincoln attraction at the Illinois State Pavilion of the 1964 New York World's Fair. This marked a change in the industry, as computers were a pivotal part in creating the figure.

In the modern era, animatronics have become cheaper to produce, so much so that many companies make small animatronic toys. For example, FurReal Friends's lineup of animatronic animal plushies.

- 1939–1939: Sparko, The Robot Dog, and Elektro, performs in front of the public. Both were manufactured by the Westinghouse Electric Corporation. Elektro was one of the first robots, using basic sensors and tube logic to receive commands and roughly know when it crashed into a wall. It could blow up balloons, smoke cigarettes, synthesize text, and move its legs and arms. In 1939, Elektro received a pet, and the first mainstream animatronic, Sparko. However, unlike Elektro, Sparko had no built-in computer and was not remote controlled, instead using an external computer controlled by an operator. Unlike many depictions of robots in that time, Sparko represented a living animal, and thus became the very first modern day animatronic character, along with an unnamed horse which was reported to gallop realistically. The animatronic galloping horse was also on display at the 1939 New York World's Fair, in a different exhibit than Sparko's.
- 1961: Heinrich Ernst develops the MH-1, a computer-operated mechanical hand.
- 1961: Walt Disney coins the term "Audio-Animatronics" and his WED Enterprises team begins developing modern animatronic technology.
- 1963: The first Audio-Animatronics created by Disney, the Enchanted Tiki Birds of Walt Disney's Enchanted Tiki Room, debut at Disneyland.
- 1964: In the film Mary Poppins, animatronic birds are the first animatronics featured in a motion picture. The first animatronic figure of a person, that of Abraham Lincoln, is created by Disney for its Abraham Lincoln attraction at the Illinois State Pavilion of the 1964 New York World's Fair.
- 1971: Walt Disney World opens with the Country Bear Jamboree and Mickey Mouse Revue attractions, containing 24 and 81 Audio-Animatronics, respectively. The park also opens with The Hall of Presidents, which started with 37 animatronics and adds a new animatronic for each new president.
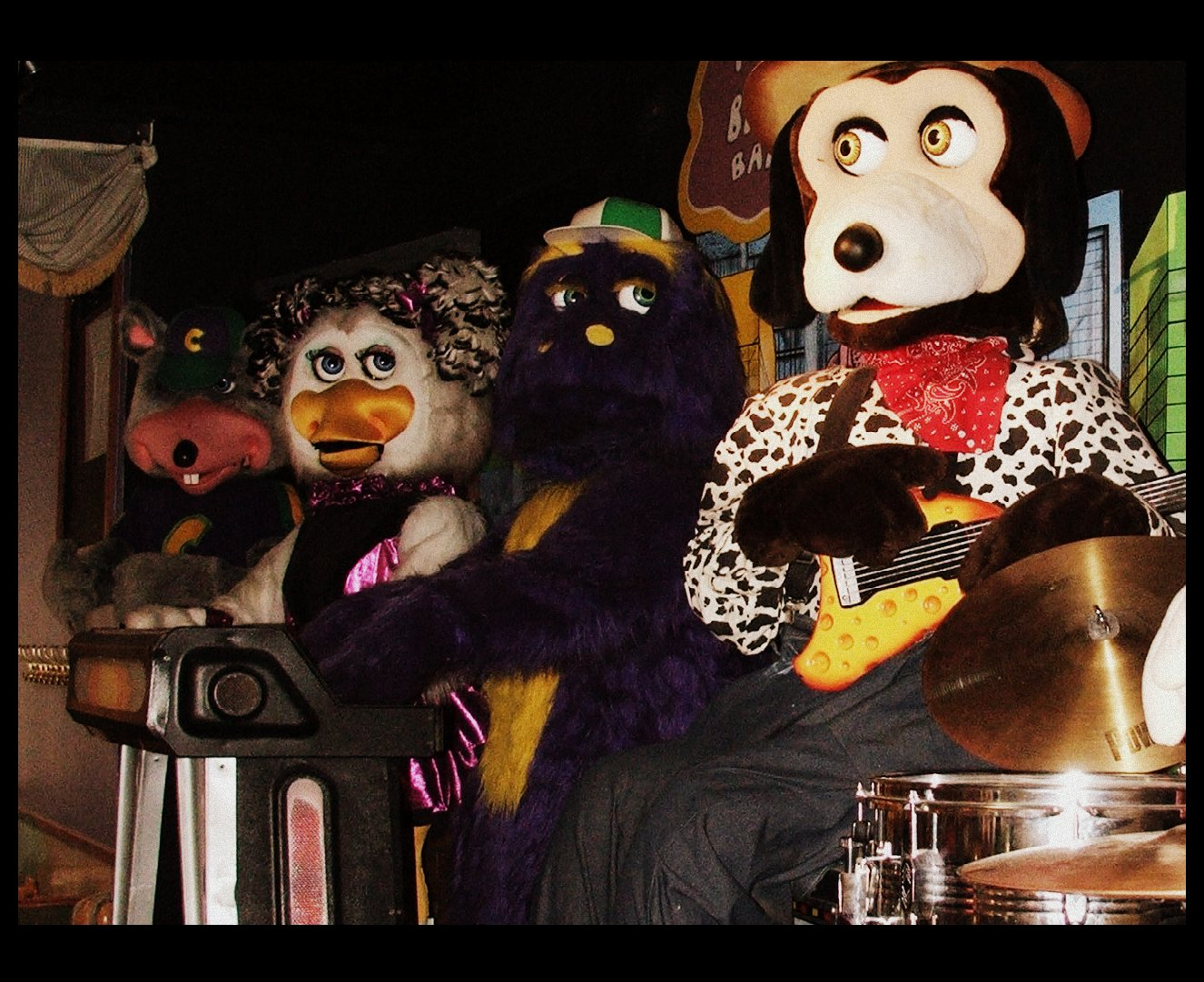
- An animatronic band at Chuck E. Cheese
  1977: Chuck E. Cheese's Pizza Time Theatre opens under Warner Communications as the first restaurant with animatronics as an attraction in San Jose, California, created by Nolan Bushnell and designed by Harold Goldbrandsen. Bushnell, hoping to expand Pizza Time Theatre into a chain, purchased all assets from the uninterested Warner for $500,000 by 1978.
- 1977: John Wardley debuts "Charlie Plucket" Animatronic on BBC's Tomorrow's World.
- 1978: AVG Technologies is founded by Alvaro Villa, former head of electronic animation research and development for the Walt Disney Company.
- 1980: ShowBiz Pizza Place debuts The Rock-afire Explosion, an animatronic band manufactured by Aaron Fechter's Creative Engineering Inc. (CEI) to directly compete with Chuck E. Cheese. CEI's preceding animatronic bands, the Wolf Pack 5 and the Hard Luck Bears, solidify their presence in numerous amusement parks around the world.
- 1981: Efteling renovates its Sprookjesbos walk through ride, adding 92 animatronics.
- 1982: Ben Franklin is the first animatronic figure to walk up a set of stairs.
- 1982: Daniel and the Dixie Diggers, the first animatronic band from Sally Industries of Jacksonville, Florida, debuts at the Mark Twain's Riverboat Playhouse in Kendall, Florida.
- 1982: David L. Brown establishes the first Bullwinkle's Family Food N' Fun Restaurant in Santa Clara, California, with prototype animatronics provided by Fred Hope's The Only Animated Display & Design Company. AVG Technologies supplied further animatronics for the chain starting in 1983, and later by Dreamation in 1998.
- 1982: The first Celebration Station opens with a W.O.O.F. Radio animatronic show by Creative Presentations, Inc. of Schaumburg, Illinois. Celebration Station later opened locations with Sally Corporation's Daniel and the Dixie Diggers with Jethro P. Hogg starting in 1991, along with a retrofit of the latter known as The Rockin' Rascals for Knoxville, Tennessee by 1993.
- 1982: Warner Communications, five years after losing ownership of Pizza Time Theatre, creates the Gadgets chain of restaurants (initially named "Gizmos"). These featured Sammy Sands, an animatronic pianist, and the Looney Tunes Revue, both manufactured by Advanced Animations of Southbury, Connecticut. More than satisfied by the results of the two productions, Warner purchased Advanced Animations from founders Bob Marquis and Dan Long, renaming the company to Warner Technologies, Inc. under their leisure division. Along with Sammy Sands and the Looney Tunes Revue for Gadgets, Warner Technologies continued manufacturing shows for other clients, most notably the Electric Mice Orchestra.
- 1986: Warner Communications sells Advanced Animations back to Bob Marquis and Dan Long, relocating to Stockbridge, Vermont. Shortly after, VP Productions (later VP Animations, LLC.) forms in Watertown, Connecticut by previous Advanced Animations alumni, including Scott Pokorak. VP would become known for their work in producing animatronics for Dandy Bear in Florida and Stew Leonard's across Connecticut, New York, and New Jersey. They also created the Rockin' Rollin' 50's Show along with Mick Jaguar and the Sly Cats for a handful of smaller venues.
- 1987: Stew Leonard's in Norwalk, Connecticut implements the Farm Fresh Five animatronic band, initially manufactured by Advanced Animations. More animatronics were added to Norwalk and locations afterward, such as the Hank and Beau characters by Sally Industries.
- 1989: The second generation of Disney's generic animatronics, the "A-100", portraying the Wicked Witch of the West from The Wizard of Oz is developed for The Great Movie Ride attraction at Disney-MGM Studios.
- 1990: ShowBiz Pizza begins to convert the Rock-afire Explosion into "Chuck E. Cheese & Munch's Make Believe Band" and cuts ties with CEI.
- 1997: Garner Holt Productions begins supplying a 32 movement Chuck E. Cheese animatronic for Chuck E. Cheese's "Studio C" stages. To cut manufacturing and maintenance costs, this number was reduced to 16 movements starting in 2002.
- 1998: Tiger Electronics begins selling Furby, an animatronic pet that speaks over 800 English and "Furbish" phrases and can react to its environment.
- 1999: AVG manufactures approximately 140 animatronics for Universal Islands of Adventure. These were for the Dudley Do-Right's Ripsaw Falls, The Cat in the Hat, and Popeye & Bluto's Bilge-Rat Barges attractions.
- 2001: The largest animatronic figure ever built was the Spinosaurus for Steven Spielberg's franchise Jurassic Park.
- 2005: Engineered Arts produces the first version of their animatronic actor, RoboThespian.
- October 31, 2008 – July 1, 2009: The Abraham Lincoln animatronic character is upgraded to incorporate new technology at The Hall of Presidents.
- 2019: Disney releases a number of new characters based on their third-generation platform "A-1000".
- 2025: Garner Holt Productions acquires Advanced Animations as a subsidiary, revealed in that year's IAAPA expo.

== Design ==
There are quite a few ways to build an animatronic, however most follow this basic structure:

An animatronic's character is typically designed to be as realistic as possible and is built similarly to their real-world appearance. The framework of the figure functions as the "skeleton", while joints, motors, and actuators act as the "muscles". The electrical components are connected by wires resembling the nervous system of a real animal or person. Steel, aluminum, plastic, and wood are all commonly used in building animatronics, each with a specific purpose. Foundational strength, weight, and cost should be considered when determining the most appropriate material to use. Several other materials are used in the construction of an animatronic figure's exterior. Depending on the circumstances, the optimal material is one that produces the most lifelike form. For example, eyes and teeth are commonly made entirely out of acrylic.

One method of constructing animatronics can be found in the Chuck E. Cheese's Studio C animatronic by Garner Holt Productions, made of latex rubber, metal, and plastic, supported by an internal skeleton. An all-metal bunyip animatronic in Australia uses water to actuate the creature's mouth.

=== Materials ===
- Latex: Due to its high elasticity, latex is a commonly used material. It is also pre-vulcanized, making it quick and easy to apply. Latex is produced in several grades. Grade 74 is a popular form of latex that dries rapidly and can be applied very thick, making it ideal for developing molds. Foam latex is a lightweight, soft form of latex which is used in masks and facial prosthetics to change a person's appearance. In animatronics, it is used to create a realistic "skin". The Wizard of Oz was one of the first films to make extensive use of foam latex prosthetics in the 1930s.
- Silicone: Disney has a research team devoted to the improvement and development of methods to create more lifelike animatronics exteriors with silicone. RTV silicone (room temperature vulcanization silicone) is used primarily as a molding material as it is very easy to use but is relatively expensive. Few other materials stick to it, making molds easy to separate. Bubbles are removed from silicone by pouring the liquid material in a thin stream or processing in a vacuum chamber prior to use. Fumed silica is used as a bulking agent for thicker coatings of the material.
- Polyurethane: Polyurethane rubber is a more cost effective material to use in place of silicone. Polyurethane comes in various levels of hardness which are measured on the Shore scale. Rigid polyurethane foam is used in prototyping because it can be milled and shaped in high density. Flexible polyurethane foam is often used in the actual building of the final animatronic figure because it is flexible and bonds well with latex.
- Plaster: As a commonplace construction and home decorating material, plaster is widely available. Its rigidity limits its use in molds, and plaster molds are unsuitable when undercuts are present. This may make plaster far more difficult to use than softer materials like latex or silicone.

=== Movement ===
Pneumatic actuators can be used for small animatronics but are not powerful enough for large designs and must be supplemented with hydraulics. To create more realistic movement in large figures, an analog system is generally used to give the figures a full range of fluid motion rather than simple two-position movements.

Mimicking the subtle movements of humans and other living creatures is a challenging task when developing animatronics. One of the most common emotional models is the Facial Action Coding System (FACS) developed by Ekman and Friesen. FACS asserts that through facial expression, humans can recognize six basic emotions: anger, disgust, fear, joy, sadness, and surprise. Another theory is that of Ortony, Clore, and Collins, or the OCC model which defines 22 different emotional categories.

In 2020, Disney revealed its new animatronic robot that can breathe, move its eyes in a human-like manner, and identify people around it in order to select an appropriate response. Disney's previous animatronics were used in purely scripted, non-interactive situations, such as theme park rides.

== Training and education ==
Animatronics has been developed as a career which combines the disciplines of mechanical engineering, casting/sculpting, control technologies, electrical/electronic systems, radio control and airbrushing.

Some colleges and universities offer degree programs in animatronics. Individuals who pursue animatronics typically earn a degree in robotics first, which provides the basics and specializations required for animatronics engineering.

Students achieving a bachelor's degree in robotics commonly complete courses in things such as :

- Mechanical engineering
- Industrial robotics
- Mechatronics systems
- Modeling of robotics systems
- Robotics engineering
- Foundational theory of robotics
- Introduction to robotics

== In popular culture ==
Animatronic characters appear in horror films and survival horror video games, which typically feature possessed animatronics as antagonists.

=== In films ===
The film industry has been a driving force revolutionizing the technology used to develop animatronics. Animatronics are used in situations to fabricate a creature that does not exist, when it is too risky or costly to use real actors or animals, or if the action could never be obtained with a living person or animal. Its main advantage over CGI and stop-motion is that the simulated creature has a physical presence moving in front of the camera in real time. The technology behind animatronics has become more advanced and sophisticated over the years, making even puppets more lifelike.

Animatronics were first introduced by Disney in the 1964 film Mary Poppins, which featured an animatronic bird. Since then, animatronics have been used extensively in such movies as Jaws and E.T. the Extra-Terrestrial.

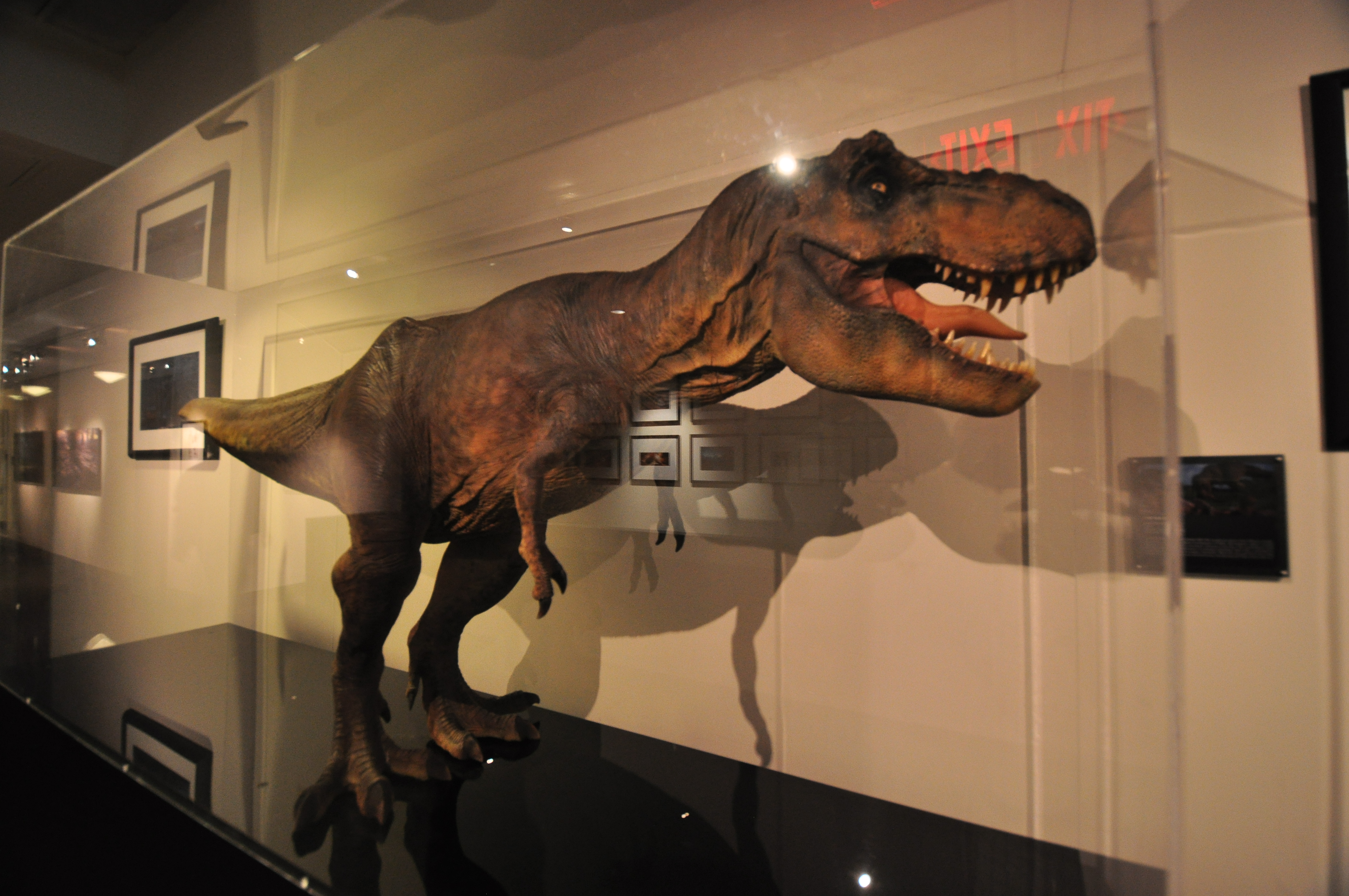
A maquette of the T-Rex in Jurassic Park

Directors such as Steven Spielberg and Jim Henson have been pioneers in using animatronics in the film industry. Two films directed by Henson, The Dark Crystal and Labyrinth, showcased groundbreaking puppets designed by Brian Froud and created by the then-recently established Jim Henson's Creature Shop in London, England.

The 1993 film Jurassic Park, directed by Spielberg, used a combination of computer-generated imagery in conjunction with life-sized animatronic dinosaurs built by Stan Winston and his team. Winston's animatronic T-Rex stood at almost 20 feet (6.1 m) tall and 40 feet (12 m) in length, and even the largest animatronics, weighing 9,000 pounds (4,100 kg), were able to perfectly recreate the appearance and natural movement on screen of a full-sized Tyrannosaurus rex. Jack Horner called it "the closest [he's] ever been to a live dinosaur". Critics evaluated Spielberg's dinosaurs as breathtaking and terrifyingly realistic.

The 1999 BBC miniseries Walking with Dinosaurs was produced using a combination of 80% CGI and 20% animatronic models. Animatronics were most appropriate for both distance shots and close-ups of the dinosaurs. Animatronics for the series were designed by British animatronics firm Crawley Creatures. The show was revived in 2007 with a live adaptation of the series, Walking with Dinosaurs: The Arena Spectacular, which also featured animatronics.

Geoff Peterson is an animatronic human skeleton that served as the sidekick on the late-night talk show The Late Late Show with Craig Ferguson from 2010 to 2014. Often referred to as a "robot skeleton", Peterson is a radio-controlled animatronic puppet designed and built by Grant Imahara of MythBusters.

=== Films focusing on animatronics ===
- The Banana Splits Movie, a 2019 American comedy horror film starring Dani Kind, Steve Lund, Sara Canning, and the voice of Eric Bauza, follows a young boy and his family who, as a birthday present, attend a live taping of a successful children's television series featuring four goofy animatronic characters named Fleegle, Bingo, Drooper, and Snorky. However, their new software updates go haywire upon learning of the upcoming cancellation of their show, and the characters start a killing spree that the crew and audience must survive. It is a horror reimagining of the 1968–1970 television series of the same name.
- Willy's Wonderland, a 2021 American action comedy horror film starring Nicolas Cage, Emily Tosta, David Sheftell and Beth Grant, follows a quiet drifter who is tricked into cleaning up a once-successful abandoned family entertainment center while battling the restaurant's eight murderous animatronic characters (possessed by souls of cannibalistic serial killers) with the aid of a teenager and her friends.

=== Short films ===
- The Hug, a 2018 horror short film directed by Jack Bishop and Justin Nijm, and starring Nick Armstrong and Roman George, follows a bratty birthday boy at Pandory's Pan Pizza Palace, a ShowBiz Pizza Place-like restaurant, who has an awkward situation with Pandory the Panda, the pizzeria's giant panda animatronic mascot. It premiered on Hulu as part of its "Huluween" film competition.

=== Television ===
- Regular Show features a group of recurring antagonists known as "The Capicola Gang", a trio of anthropomorphic animatronic characters from The Fun Fun Zone. They are the main antagonists of the episodes "Fuzzy Dice" and "Steak Me Amadeus", and one of the members makes a cameo appearance in "Can you Ear Me Now?" They are a parody of the animatronic mascots of children entertainment centers like Chuck E. Cheese.
- The Gravity Falls episode "Soos and the Real Girl" features an animatronic band called "Hoo-Ha's Jamboree" playing at Hoo-Ha Owl's Pizzamatronic Jamboree. It is a parody of The Rock-afire Explosion of ShowBiz Pizza Place and consists of Hoo-Ha the Owl (guitarist and lead singer), Cheerleader (banjoist), Beaver (guitarist), Rat in a Barrel (two identical animatronics sat on either side of the stage), Cowboy Frog (bongo player), and Will E. Badger (opening act). They reappear in the episodes "Weirdmageddon Part 1" and "Weirdmageddon 2: Escape From Reality".

=== Advertising ===
The British advertisement campaign for Cadbury Schweppes titled Gorilla featured an actor inside a gorilla suit with an animatronically animated face.

The Slowskys was an advertising campaign for Comcast Cable's Xfinity broadband Internet service. The ad features two animatronic turtles, and it won the gold Effie Award in 2007.

=== Five Nights at Freddy's ===
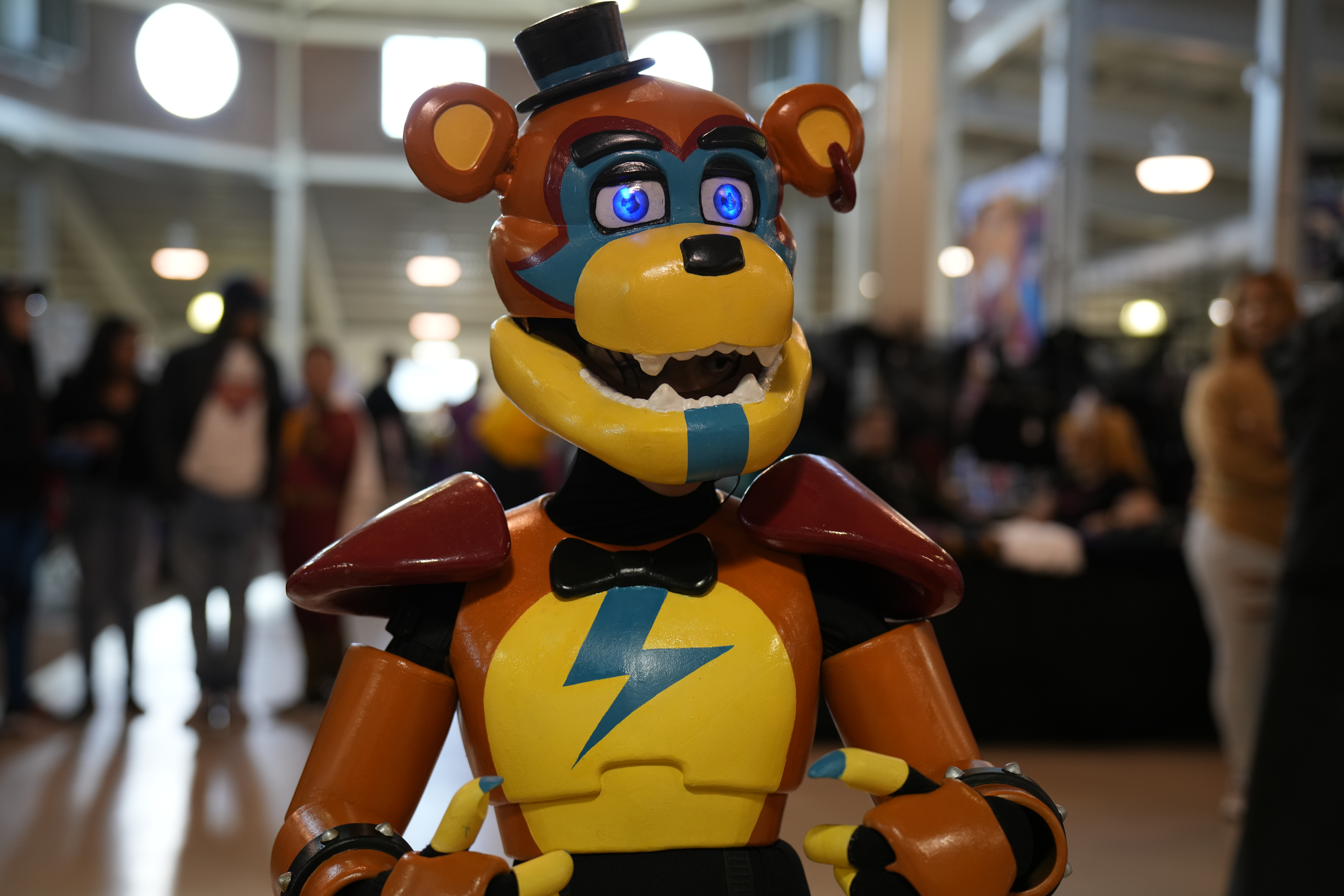
Cosplayer dressed as Glamrock Freddy from Five Nights at Freddy's: Security Breach at Comic-Con in November 2023

Five Nights at Freddy's is a horror video game franchise created by Scott Cawthon, featuring various animatronic characters as antagonists who try to kill the player. In the first game of the series, the animatronics' history of violent behavior is implied through in-game newspapers to be caused by spirit possession; specifically, the spirits of children whose deaths are linked to the fictional Freddy Fazbear's Pizza chain of restaurants. This story was expanded in the sequels, which introduce the series' overarching antagonist, William Afton, one of Freddy's co-founders and a serial killer. After his death, Afton's spirit would also possess an animatronic, known as Springtrap, which was introduced in Five Nights at Freddy's 3 and became a recurring antagonist.

Since the original game's release in 2014, Five Nights at Freddy's has grown into a large media franchise comprising numerous sequels, spin-offs, a novel trilogy, and an anthology series of short stories. A film adaptation, produced by Blumhouse Productions, was released in 2023, followed by a sequel in 2025, and an upcoming third installment.

=== Toys ===
Some examples of animatronic toys include TJ Bearytails, Big Mouth Billy Bass, FurReal, Kota the triceratops, Pleo, WowWee Alive Chimpanzee, Microsoft Actimates, and Furby. Well-known brands include Cuddle Barn, PBC International, Telco, Sound N Light, Iwaya Corporation, Nika International, Gemmy Industries, Tickle Me Elmo, Chantilly Lane and Dan Dee.

== See also ==
- Automaton
- Robotic performance art
- Uncanny valley
- Automatonophobia
