= Chasing 3000 =

2007 US sports drama film by Gregory J. Lanesey

- Directed by: Gregory J. Lanesey
- Written by: Bill Mikita; Cris D'Annunzio; Gregory J. Lanesey
- Produced by: Ryan R. Johnson
- Starring: Trevor Morgan; Rory Culkin; Ray Liotta; Lauren Holly
- Cinematography: Denis Maloney
- Edited by: Shannon Mitchell
- Music by: Lawrence Shragge
- Release date: April 29, 2007
- Running time: 115 minutes
- Country: United States
- Language: English

Chasing 3000 is a 2007 American independent film chronicling the cross-country travel of two brothers to see the 3,000th base hit of Major League Baseball legend Roberto Clemente. It stars Trevor Morgan, Rory Culkin, Ray Liotta, and Lauren Holly. The film was originally meant to premiere at the 2006 Major League Baseball All-Star Game, but its release was delayed until April 2007.

== Plot ==
In 1972, Roberto Clemente is close to making his 3,000th hit. High school student Mickey (Trevor Morgan) and his younger brother Roger (Rory Culkin) drive to Pittsburgh from Los Angeles with a learner's permit to attend the baseball game. Roger has muscular dystrophy, but that does not deter them from traveling with their grandfather (Seymour Cassel). Their mother (Lauren Holly) follows them and they are later helped by a runaway, a motorcycle gang leader, a farmer, and an emergency room doctor.

== Cast ==
- Ray Liotta as Adult Mickey Straka
  - Trevor Morgan as Teenage Mickey Straka
    - Blake Woodyard as Young Mickey Straka
- Jay Karnes as Adult Roger Straka
  - Rory Culkin as Teenage Roger Straka
    - Nicholas Brady as Young Roger Straka
- Lauren Holly as Marilyn Straka
- Keith David as Officer L., Highway Patrol
- Seymour Cassel as Poppy
- M. Emmet Walsh as Chuck Ireland
- Ricardo Chavira as Dr. Boogie
- Michael O'Keefe as Dr. Stuart
- Tania Raymonde as Kelly
- Lori Petty as Deputy Fryman
- Kevin Gage as Short Order Cook
- Louis Lombardi as Short Order Cook
- Andrew Bryniarski as Gang Member
- Dan Fastuca as Gang Member
- Willa Holland as Jamie
- Matt Abshire as Bobby
- Cris D'Annunzio as Principal Motley
- Michael Govia as The Minister
- Drake Kemper as Danny
- Madison Lanesey as Maddy Straka
- Patrick Sebes as Bobby Straka
- Christopher May as Coach Johnson
- Katie Piel as K. Copeland, Junior Nurse
- Zakk Wylde as Gang Leader
- Roberto Clemente as Himself (archive footage) (uncredited)

== Production ==
The film was originally meant to premiere at the 2006 Major League Baseball All-Star Game, but the filmmakers changed their minds because they wanted a better chance of securing a distribution deal. It cost less than $3 million to produce the film. The film's producer Ryan Johnson gave the script to actor Ray Liotta's business agent. When Liotta read the script, he said that he could relate to it and wanted a part in the film. Liotta joining the film as an actor caused other actors to join the production. It was originally intended to have a straight to DVD release, but the filmmakers changed their mind once Liotta had a role. Bill Mikita began to write the screenplay in 1999 and he decided to add Clemente's 3,000th hit to the script because he and his brother Steve are major fans of the athlete. The film was based on Mikita and his brother's own cross-country trip to the game.

== Release ==
The film had its debut on April 29, 2007 at the AMC Loews 34th Street Theater. It was shown at the Tribeca Film Festival in 2007 and former Vice President Al Gore hosted the gala on opening night. The DVD release date was on September 28, 2010.

== Reception ==
Andrew Barker of Variety wrote, "A brotherly love tale substantially weightier than its baseball road-trip premise might indicate, Chasing 3000 overcomes some heavy-handed moments and narrative shortcuts with a surprising degree of emotional honesty". Bob Hoover, writing for Pittsburgh Post-Gazette stated, "Its earnestness and innocence carries Chasing 3000 a long way, and its sweet appreciation of the 'Burgh will win over local hearts."

Michael Ordona of the Los Angeles Times gave a mixed review, stating, "This sincere, nostalgic, brothers-on-the-road movie has its strong points but sadly fails to do what Clemente so famously did in his final at-bat—finish on a high note".

== See also ==
- List of baseball films
