= Genius (1999 film) =

- Promotional advertisement
- Screenplay by: John Rieck; Jim Lincoln; Dan Studney
- Story by: John Rieck
- Directed by: Rod Daniel
- Starring: Trevor Morgan; Emmy Rossum
- Theme music composer: Marco Marinangeli
- Original language: English

Production
- Producer: Aaron Meyerson
- Cinematography: Peter Benison
- Editor: Robert Souders
- Running time: 86 minutes
- Production company: DIC Productions, L.P.

Original release
- Network: Disney Channel
- Release: August 21, 1999

Genius is a 1999 American comedy film released as a Disney Channel Original Movie (DCOM) and directed by Rod Daniel. The film stars Trevor Morgan and Emmy Rossum, and premiered on Disney Channel on August 21, 1999. In the film, Morgan portrays a genius who enrolls in college at the age of 12 and takes on a bad boy image in an attempt to gain friends.

== Plot ==
Charlie Boyle, a 12-year-old physics genius and hockey lover, enrolls in a Wisconsin college so he can work with Dr. Krickstein, a scientist he admires. Mostly Charlie is sick of being a geek and he was treated like dirt because he was a genius. For years, Krickstein has been studying gravity in an attempt to defy it. Krickstein's laboratory is located underneath the college's hockey arena. Charlie has difficulty making friends with his college students and roommates. Charlie meets a teenage girl named Claire Addison, who attends a local junior high school. To be near Claire, Charlie tells her that he is a new student at her school, and that his name is Chaz Anthony. Charlie chooses to reinvent himself because he feels being a nerd does not guarantee him a girlfriend. Charlie enrolls at Claire's school as Chaz, and takes on a bad boy image in an attempt to be cool and gain friends. To get closer to Claire, Chaz convinces her to tutor him. Claire is the daughter of Coach Addison, who coaches the college's Northern Lights hockey team.

Charlie realizes that living two lives can be difficult. Eventually, Charlie's double life is exposed at the college's conference championship, when Claire's father identifies him as Charlie Boyle. Claire confronts Charlie, who admits the truth. Charlie realizes that he left the laboratory's particle accelerator running; it overheats, cracking the ice and interrupting the game which the Northern Lights were about to win, having used advice Charlie gave them. Coach Addison's job is put in jeopardy as a result and Claire, disgusted by Charlie's actions, tells him she never wants to see him again and refuses to take his phone calls. Charlie leaves junior high school and although he makes an announcement over the PA system apologizing, Claire and his best friends Odie and Dieon refuse to forgive him.

Having isolated a graviton and figuring out how to use it to control the movements of another object, Charlie decides to use it to help the hockey team cheat and win against the other team and its own cheating tactics. Charlie appeals to his friends for help. They refuse until, after being called Chaz by Claire, he tells them he is Charlie Boyle and he cannot do it without them. Odie and Dieon decide to help and finally Claire and his other junior high classmates follow. After creating a distraction with the help of his classmates to get microchips onto the three main enemy players, Charlie and Claire proceed to take control of them to prevent them from cheating.

Dr. Krickstein initially refuses to have anything to do with Charlie's decision to use science for cheating, but later steps in to help and accidentally causes an electrical surge that reverses the polarity of the graviton, causing Charlie, Claire and Krickstein, as well as the players they are connected to, to defy gravity. The Northern Lights win and Coach Addison's job is saved. Charlie and Claire kiss and start dating. Later, Charlie and his friends set up a friendly ice hockey game with Krickstein joining, but before they can start, the Northern Lights arrive with Charlie's college roommate and friend Mike, having learned what Charlie did for them from Claire's father, whom Claire told. The Northern Lights ask for a game against Charlie and his friends. Charlie agrees, but on the condition that Krickstein is on their team, to which they reluctantly agree.

== Cast ==
- Trevor Morgan as Charlie Boyle / Chaz Anthony
- Emmy Rossum as Claire Addison
- Charles Fleischer as Dr. Krickstein
- Yannick Bisson as Mike MacGregor
- Peter Keleghan as Dean Wallace
- Philip Granger as Coach Addison
- Jonathon Whittaker as Mr. Boyle, Charlie's Father (as Jonathan Whittaker)
- Patrick Thomas as Odie
- Matthew Koller as Deion
- Chuck Campbell as Hugo Peplo
- Eli Ham as Omar Sullivan
- Darryl Pring as "Bear" Berczinski

== Production and release ==
In January 1997, the film was in development by DIC Entertainment (which Disney owned at the time of development and film release) with plans to broadcast it on Disney Channel, as a joint project between DIC and Disney. The film premiered on the channel on August 21, 1999.

== Reception ==
In 2012, Complex ranked the film at number 6 on the magazine's list of the 25 best Disney Channel Original Movies. In 2016, the film was ranked at number 92 on MTV's list of the best DCOMs, consisting of 99 films. Also in 2016, Aubrey Page of Collider ranked each DCOM released up to that point. Page ranked Genius at number 31 and wrote that the film ensured "the reign of 1999 as a peak DCOM year".

== See also ==
- List of films about ice hockey
