= I'll Remember April (1999 film) =

- Theatrical release poster
- Directed by: Bob Clark
- Written by: Mark Sanderson
- Produced by: Paul Colichman; David Forrest; Mark R. Harris; Mark Headley; Sam Irvin
- Starring: Pat Morita; Trevor Morgan; Pam Dawber; Haley Joel Osment; Mark Harmon; Yuji Okumoto
- Cinematography: Stephen M. Katz
- Edited by: Stan Cole
- Music by: Paul Zaza
- Production company: Regent Entertainment
- Distributed by: Regent Entertainment; Pioneer Entertainment
- Release date: April 5, 1999
- Running time: 90 minutes
- Country: United States
- Language: English

I'll Remember April is a 1999 American family drama film directed by Bob Clark and starring Pat Morita, Pam Dawber, Haley Joel Osment, Mark Harmon, and Yuki Tokuhiro. The film is about four children who find Japanese sailor Matsuo Yomma (Yuji Okumoto) when he washes ashore during the Second World War. Though filmed in 1998, it did not get a video release until 2001.

== Plot ==
On the American home front during World War II, adolescent Duke Cooper and his three best friends live in a Pacific Coast community where they play soldier, experiment with swearing, and earnestly patrol the beach for Japanese submarines. The realities of the war come crashing down on the youths when Japanese sailor Matsuo Yomma, stranded and wounded after his sub quickly dived, washes ashore. Duke's older brother is awaiting combat in the Pacific theater. Meanwhile, the Japanese-American community has been deemed a threat to national security. Willy Tanaka, Duke's Japanese-American pal, must be sent away to an internment camp along with his mother Kimiko and grandfather Abe. After befriending Matsuo, the boys become torn between turning him in to the FBI or saving him.

== Cast ==
- Pat Morita as Abraham "Abe" Tanaka
- Trevor Morgan as Duke Cooper
- Pam Dawber as Barbara Cooper
- Haley Joel Osment as Peewee Clayton
- Mark Harmon as John Cooper
- Yuki Tokuhiro as Willy Tanaka
- Richard Taylor Olson as Tyler Walker
- Yuji Okumoto as Matsuo Yomma
- Diana Tanaka as Kimiko Tanaka
- Paul Dooley as Earl Schimmel

== Production ==
The train scenes were filmed at the since closed Fillmore & Western Railroad in Fillmore, California.

According to an interview on The Tonight Show with Conan O'Brien, Michael Cera tried out for the part of Peewee Clayton, making it the second role he lost to Haley Joel Osment after The Sixth Sense.

== Critical reception ==
Variety wrote I'll Remember April "revels in simple boyhood pleasures, but feels phony as it tries to mine more serious themes of torn loyalties during difficult early days of WWII".

== See also ==
- List of American films of 1999
