= The Banana Splits Movie =

2019 film directed by Danishka Esterhazy

- San Diego Comic-Con poster
- Directed by: Danishka Esterhazy
- Written by: Jed Elinoff; Scott Thomas
- Based on: The Banana Splits by Hanna-Barbera Productions
- Produced by: Adam Friedlander
- Starring: Dani Kind; Steve Lund; Celina Martin; Finlay Wojtak-Hissong; Sara Canning; Romeo Carere; Maria Nash
- Cinematography: Trevor Calverley
- Edited by: Michael P. Mason
- Music by: Patrick Stump
- Production companies: Blue Ribbon Content; Blue Ice Pictures
- Distributed by: Warner Bros. Home Entertainment
- Release date: July 18, 2019 (San Diego Comic-Con)
- Running time: 89 minutes
- Country: United States
- Language: English

The Banana Splits Movie is a 2019 American comedy horror film directed by Danishka Esterhazy from a screenplay written by Jed Elinoff and Scott Thomas. It serves as a horror reimagining of Hanna-Barbera's 1968 children's television series The Banana Splits, and stars Dani Kind, Steve Lund, Celina Martin, Finlay Wotjak-Hissong, Sara Canning, Romeo Carere, and Maria Nash, with Eric Bauza as the voice of the Banana Splits. It follows a family who try to survive during a live-on-tape of the series when the titular characters start a killing spree around the filming studio upon learning of the show's upcoming cancellation.

The project was first announced in February 2019, following an original idea from Josh Van Houdt, Syfy's vice president of development, about turning a discussed Banana Splits film adaptation into a horror film. Esterhazy was hired as director with screenwriters Elinoff and Thomas having conceived the idea based on inspiration from 1986's Chopping Mall and 1988's Child's Play. It is also known for its similarities to the Five Nights at Freddy's franchise, with many fans believing it is a rework of one of Warner Bros. Pictures' scrapped scripts when they had the rights of the then-upcoming Five Nights at Freddy's film adaptation.

The Banana Splits Movie premiered at San Diego Comic-Con on July 18, 2019, and was released through video on demand on August 13, 2019, by Warner Bros. Home Entertainment. The film received mixed reviews from critics.

== Plot ==
Harley Williams is a huge fan of The Banana Splits, a successful children's television series that features four animatronic characters—Fleegle, Bingo, Drooper, and Snorky—with their human co-star Stevie. As a surprise birthday present, his parents, Beth and Mitch, take him, his half-brother Austin, and his classmate Zoe to a live taping of the series at Taft Studios. Upon arrival, the family meets several audience and staff members, including the show's host, Paige, and her assistant, Doug; fan couple Thadd and Poppy Glarady; aspiring young performer Parker and her father, Jonathan; and security guard Sal.

As the tape is being prepped, Taft's new vice president of programming, Andy Viktorson, informs the show's producer, Rebecca Rayson that he is cancelling the series after the recording, as it does not go with his network's vision. When Drooper overhears this through a drunken Stevie, the Banana Splits' new software updates malfunction, as Bingo kidnaps Andy while Drooper kills Stevie by thrusting a prop lollipop down his throat. Outside the studio, Beth learns that Mitch has been cheating on her with another woman. When she returns inside, Mitch finds Sal's decapitated corpse and is then chased and run over by Snorky.

While live-streaming backstage, Poppy accepts Thadd's marriage proposal, but Fleegle appears and kills Thadd by sawing him in half as part of a magic show. Fleegle is about to attack a tearful Poppy when he hears Harley and Zoe looking for Snorky, and takes them to the workshop as Poppy mourns Thadd's death with her makeup running down on her face as she cries. He traps them with Parker, who was kidnapped by Bingo when Drooper burned Jonathan's face as they were searching for Andy for an audition. The remaining survivors learn about the Banana Splits' carnage after they find a seriously injured Jonathan. Paige finds all phones disconnected or destroyed, while Beth manages to subdue Bingo before she and Austin find Poppy and convince her to join the group.

Meanwhile, Rebecca and Jonathan are forced to participate in the show's obstacle course until Fleegle stabs Jonathan to death with a prop key and Drooper kills Rebecca by smashing her face in with a hammer. Harley, Zoe, and Parker meet the Banana Splits' creator Karl Ludwigson, who considers the animatronics' actions justified by the show's cancellation. Drooper brings Bingo for repair, and Karl gets distracted enough for the kids to escape and lock him in a cell. As they look for a way out, the kids come across Snorky and convince him to help them. Beth, Austin, Paige, and Poppy arrive at the workshop to ask Karl how to stop the Banana Splits, but he does not provide any information.

The group hears music coming from a hatch in the floor and go down, where Poppy notices the mask of Hooty, an unused fifth animatronic. She loses her sanity and puts on parts of the costume before killing Karl as revenge for Thadd's death. Beth, Austin, and Paige find the underground passage littered with the corpses of Doug, the studio's crew, and the adult audience members, and discover Fleegle and Drooper are holding all the terrified children hostage while performing gruesome variants of their acts, like burning Stevie's corpse and brutally killing Andy by ripping his limbs off. Snorky arrives and chains Harley, Zoe, and Parker, but secretly gives Harley the keys to free them.

Beth and Austin manage to kill both Fleegle and Drooper while Parker guides all the children to the exit. Beth, Austin, and Harley meet up with Paige and Zoe. Bingo corners them until Snorky appears and attacks him. Snorky kills Bingo before the latter fatally injures him during the fight. As the police and paramedics arrive to attend to the survivors, Parker, reunited with her mother, decides to quit acting, and Austin and Paige start a relationship. Mitch, having survived being run over by Snorky but heavily injured, returns to seek forgiveness, but Beth punches him and demands a divorce. After some paramedics leave with Mitch calling out that to them that they forgot him, he is then killed after a now-insane Poppy runs him over in a banana split vehicle, with the animatronics in the back. While she drives and sings The Banana Splits theme song and silently laughs, Fleegle suddenly reactivates and laughs maniacally.

== Cast ==
- Dani Kind as Beth Williams
- Steve Lund as Mitch Williams
- Finlay Wojtak-Hissong as Harley Williams
- Romeo Carere as Austin Williams
- Sara Canning as Rebecca Rayson
- Naledi Majola as Paige
- Maria Nash as Zoe
- Kiroshan Naidoo as Thadd Glarady
- Celina Martin as Poppy Glarady
- Lionel Newton as Karl Ludwigson
- Richard White as Stevie
- Lia Sachs as Parker
- Keeno Lee Hector as Jonathan
- Daniel Fox as Andy Viktorson
- Vash Singh as Doug
- Nicky Rebelo as Sal
- Liza Scholtz as Zoe's mother
- Jenna Saras as Parker's mother

The animatronic characters' cast includes in-suit performers Terry Sauls as Fleegle, Buntu Plam as Bingo, Kori Clarke as Drooper, and Brandon Vraagom as Snorky. Eric Bauza provides the voices of Fleegle, Bingo and Drooper; Snorky does not speak and mostly makes honking noises. (Note: The Banana Splits costumes are modeled after the 2008 revival with some design differences.) Bauza also provides the voice of the show's announcer.

== Production ==
On February 19, 2019, Warner Bros. Television Group's Blue Ribbon Content division announced that they were collaborating with Blue Ice Pictures on producing a film adaptation of The Banana Splits television series, which would take place in a horror-like setting, scheduled to premiere at San Diego Comic-Con on July 18, 2019, to be released direct to streaming through Warner Bros. Home Entertainment on August 13, 2019, on DVD and Blu-ray on August 27, 2019, and to air on Syfy on October 12, 2019. Danishka Esterhazy, who worked as second unit director for Syfy's Channel Zero, was hired to direct the film, based on a script written by Jed Elinoff and Scott Thomas, who created Randy Cunningham: 9th Grade Ninja and wrote for The Haunting Hour: The Series. The film was rated R by the Motion Picture Association of America for "horror violence and gore", marking it as the first film adaptation of a Hanna-Barbera or Sid and Marty Krofft property to receive this classification.

On June 13, 2019, when Syfy Wire released the official trailer for the film, some drew comparisons to the then-upcoming Five Nights at Freddy's film adaptation. Patrick Stump from Fall Out Boy composed the score for the film, as well as his version of The Banana Splits theme song.

=== Home media ===
The Banana Splits Movie made an estimated $279,000 from DVD and Blu-ray home media sales.

== Reception ==
On review aggregator website Rotten Tomatoes, the film holds an approval rating of 63% based on 19 reviews, with an average rating of 5.5/10.

Kat Hughes of The Hollywood News praised the film and its direction, saying "Danishka Esterhazy proves the breadth of her directional range. The Banana Splits is a fun-filled, cacophony of zany deaths and characters, that plays out as Charlie and the Chocolate Factory for grown-ups". William Bibbiani of Bloody Disgusting gave a positive review saying that the film "offers a satisfying sequence of slasher slays" but that it "relies so much on cognitive disconnect that never feels like more than an ironic kill count".

Reviewer Jim Johnson, of Comic Book Resources, wrote that "it's a bold move that works, because, here in 2019, there's really nothing better to do with the Banana Splits. And it's not like anyone else had a better idea". Russ Burlingame of ComicBook.com praised the performances and script, saying "The Banana Splits Movie will be controversial — especially among those who still have a fondness for the original series — but it mostly sticks the landing, buoyed by a great cast, script and crew". Luke Thompson, writing to Forbes, says that "... until we get an actual Five Nights at Freddy's movie, this does deliver in that unique niche of furry animal animatronics gone scary".

Ben Kenigsberg of The New York Times gave the film a negative review, writing that it is "far less crazy than it wants to be and far more soporific than a synopsis would suggest". Mike McGranaghan of Aisle Seat gave the film 2 out of 4 stars, writing "When it's doing what it's supposed to do, The Banana Splits Movie has some definite novelty, value. Unfortunately, that's only about 50% of the time, tops".

== See also ==
- The Banana Splits in Hocus Pocus Park, another film based on the Banana Splits.
- Willy's Wonderland, a similar horror film with murderous animatronics.
- Five Nights at Freddy's, a 2023 film based on a video game with a similar premise.
- Child’s Play, a 2019 horror film with a similar premise.
