= Ric Reitz =

American actor

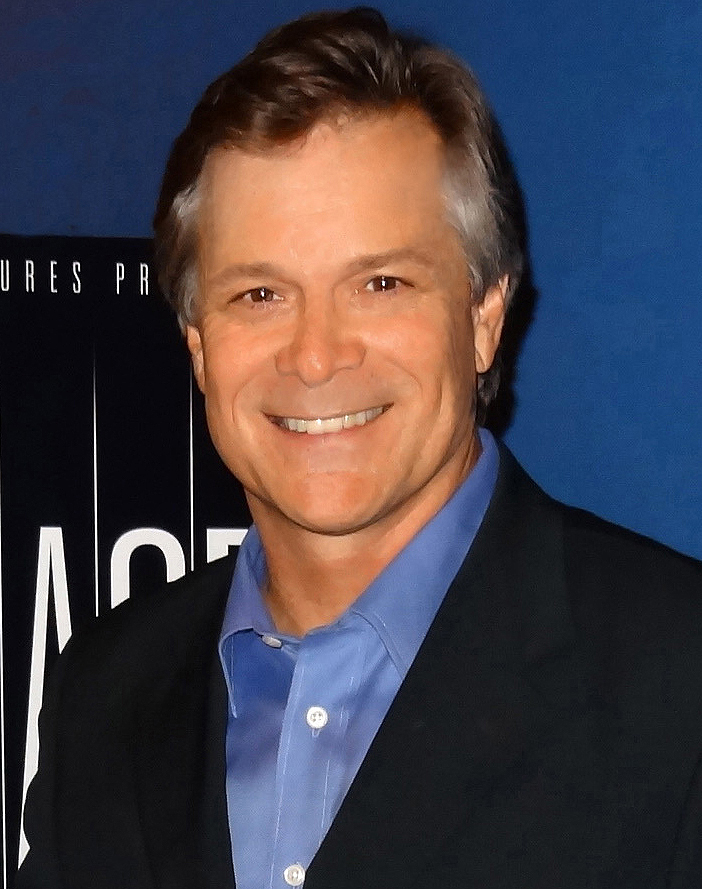
- Reitz at the screening of Solace in 2014
- Born: Kenric Lowell Reitz; September 8, 1955 (age 70); Rochester, New York
- Education: Bachelor's in radio/TV/film
- Alma mater: Bowling Green State University
- Occupations: Actor; writer; director; producer
- Years active: 1977–present
- Spouse: Noel Janet Bagrowski (m. 1981)
- Children: 2
- Website: ricreitz.com

Kenric Lowell Reitz (born September 8, 1955) is an American actor, writer, composer, director and producer.

== Early life and education ==
Reitz was born and raised in Rochester, New York. He was the middle of five creative children.

Growing up an all-star baseball player in the Rochester suburb of Henrietta, Reitz never wandered far from the arts and music, appearing in his first play as the Polynesian boy, Jerome, in South Pacific with his dad at age 11. He graduated with honors from Rush-Henrietta High School in 1973 and continued to participate in theater while attending Bowling Green State University (Ohio), where he primarily studied Radio/TV/Film, graduating cum laude in 1977.

== Career ==
Reitz's first professional acting job was in repertory with the Arts Centre Theater Company of Rochester, New York. From the fall of 1977 through the summer of 1979, he performed at both the Arts Centre Theater Co. and the Tic Toc Players theaters out of the Nazareth College Arts Centre in Pittsford, New York, including summer stock stints with the Mendon Playhouse in Mendon, New York. Over the following years, Reitz bounced between Rochester, New York City and Los Angeles, as he pursued his acting career, eventually landing in Atlanta, Georgia in 1981 with Noel Bagrowski, also from Rochester, who would become his wife that same year.

His on-screen resume began with a small role in the television movie Case Closed and has grown to lead roles in films like: The Last of Robin Hood, wherein he portrayed attorney Melvin Belli and co-starred with Kevin Kline, Susan Sarandon, and Dakota Fanning, Where The Devil Hides, with Colm Meaney and Rufus Sewell, and The Loft, with Karl Urban, James Marsden and Rachael Taylor. Reitz has also been a recurring character on television series like: Revolution, Drop Dead Diva and Surface. He is the current president of SAG-AFTRA Atlanta.

Outside of acting for stage and screen as a member of Equity and SAG-AFTRA, Reitz is a member of the DGA, WGA, the Recording Academy, BMI and the Academy of Television Arts & Sciences. He is president of Ric Reitz Writes, Inc., an award-winning writing and production company, and the president/manager of Sir Fir Books & Music, an award-winning children's music and publishing company. Specifically, Reitz was the creator and author of two children's titles: The Journey of Sir Douglas Fir: A Reader’s Musical and Second Chance Christmas: A Symphonic Play. Reitz is also a partner at Georgia Entertainment Credits, a former president and board member with the Georgia Production Partnership, and a former member of the Georgia Film Advisory Commission.

== Personal life ==
Reitz married Noel Janet Bagrowski in Rochester, New York on April 24, 1981. They have two children: Shelby Lynn Reitz (Eanes), born April 10, 1985, and Corey Bradford Reitz, born March 20, 1989.
