= David Sheftell =

American actor (born 1987)

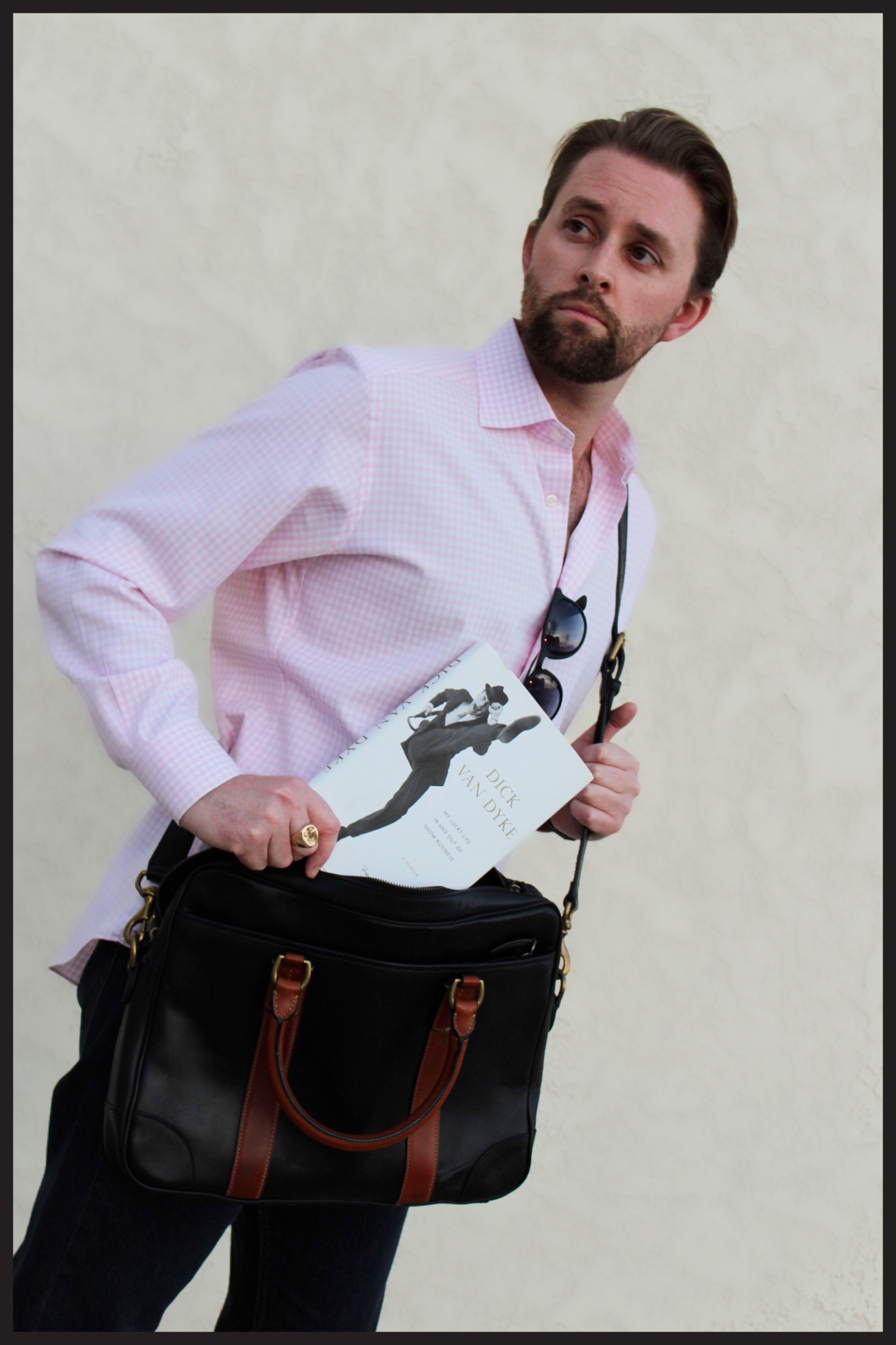
- Born: January 9, 1987 (age 39)
- Occupation: Actor

David Sheftell (born January 9, 1987) is an American film, television and voice actor known for playing Deputy Evan Olson in the 2021 film, Willy's Wonderland with Nicolas Cage and his recurring voice roles on Family Guy and American Dad.

Sheftell is originally from Calabasas, California.

== Filmography ==
=== Film ===
| Year | Title | Role | Notes |
|---|---|---|---|
| 2006 | Local Color | Mikey | Lead Cast Ray Liotta and Ron Perlman |
| 2019 | Show Me What You Got | Tom | Best International Film Terra di Siena Film Festival |
| 2021 | Willy's Wonderland | Deputy Evan Olson | Lead Cast Nicolas Cage |

=== Television ===
| Year | Title | Role | Notes |
|---|---|---|---|
| 2009-2011 | The Young and the Restless | Waiter | CBS 10 Episodes |
| 2011 | Bag of Bones | Self | Season 2, Episode 1 Lead Cast Pierce Brosnan |
| 2018 | Spinsters | Joe | Season 1, Episode 1 |
| 2018-2019 | Family Guy | Various | 21 Episodes |
| 2019 | American Dad | Various | 20 Episodes |
| 2020-2021 | Rival Peak | Saabun | 9 Episodes |
