= Ginny & Georgia season 3 =

2025 television season

Ginny & Georgia
- Season 3
- Promotional poster
- Showrunners: Debra J. Fisher; Sarah Glinski
- Starring: Brianne Howey; Antonia Gentry; Diesel La Torraca; Jennifer Robertson; Felix Mallard; Nathan Mitchell
- No. of episodes: 10

Release
- Original network: Netflix
- Original release: June 5, 2025

Season chronology
- ← Previous; Season 2

The third season of the American comedy-drama television series Ginny & Georgia was released on Netflix on June 5, 2025, and consisted of 10 episodes. The third season had been developed by Madica Productions, Critical Content, Dynamic Television, and Blue Ice Pictures in collaboration with executive producers Sarah Lampert, Sarah Glinski, Jeff Tahler, Jenny Daly, Holly Hines, Daniel March, Lance Samuels, Daniel Iron, and Armand Leo.

"Everything Just Peachy" is used in the season's tagline for promotional media to highlight the contrast between the family's self-assurance and their internal confusion as the plot develops. The season centres on the ongoing plot of Georgia and Ginny Miller, a mother and daughter team, as well as the events that follow Georgia's suspenseful arrest for Tom Fuller's murder at the conclusion of Season 2.

The primary cast, including Brianne Howey, Antonia Gentry, Diesel La Torraca, Felix Mallard, and Sara Waisglass, along with the supporting characters and a few newcomers as well.

Filming for the season took place in April 2024 in Toronto, Canada, with the prospective season title of Tulips & Tuxes. The plot follows the aftermath of the arrest of Georgia and Ginny growing up, as well as the effects of Ginny's independence on the Miller family. The series further develops the characters of Austin, Abby, Maxine, and Marcus.

Reviews were generally positive from viewers and critics, who commended the acting, especially in how Brianne Howey conveyed the character's moral complexity in the show's exploration of themes such as trauma, identity, and women's reproductive rights. Some reviews, though, noted that the show's second half had some pacing issues and relied on courtroom melodrama. The final episode ends on a very emotionally charged note, setting the tone for season four, which has been confirmed.

== Episodes ==
No. overall	No. in season	Title	Directed by	Written by	Original release date
21	1	"This Wouldn't Even Be a Podcast"	April Mullen	Sarah Lampert	June 5, 2025
Ginny struggles with gossiping classmates and anxiety after Georgia's arrest. At her arraignment, Georgia pleads not guilty, and the judge allows her to remain under house arrest with an ankle monitor until her trial. At home, Ginny confronts Georgia. Georgia admits to murdering Anthony, Kenny, and Tom, says she is terrified with no plan for the trial, and apologizes for failing to protect Ginny and Austin. Ginny tries to comfort her. Max tries to be a friend to Ginny, but Ginny grows closer to Abby, making Max jealous. Abby tells Ginny that she has been hooking up with Press. Max asks Silver out. Flashbacks show Georgia leaving with the kids after Gil is imprisoned for embezzlement and fraud. Broke and desperate to feed Ginny and Austin, Georgia steals food from a restaurant by impersonating a paying customer. Another shows the aftermath of Georgia's arrest, with Austin admitting to Ginny that he saw Georgia kill Tom. Ginny tells him he cannot tell anyone else
22	2	"Beep Beep Freaking Beep"	April Mullen	Danielle Hoover & David Monahan	June 5, 2025
A grieving Cynthia visits Georgia and asks why she killed Tom. Georgia denies doing so but says it would have been an act of kindness since Tom was already dying. Ginny has a panic attack at work and goes to Marcus, telling him she misses him and cannot talk to anyone else. She tells him she does not know how to help Georgia or if she even should. Marcus reminds her that Georgia's situation is not Ginny's responsibility. He also opens up about his depression. The two admit they still love each other and nearly kiss, but pull away. Over dinner, Lynette visits and berates Georgia for upending Zion, Ginny, and Austin's lives. Ginny runs out. Georgia follows until her ankle monitor stops her; Ginny tells Georgia that she needs space from her and continues walking. Flashbacks show Georgia dropping Ginny off at a new school and encouraging her to have confidence, assuring her that she'll find one friend.
23	3	"Friends Can Dance"	Jasmin Mozaffari	Ayotunde Ifaturoti & Michelle Askew	June 5, 2025
Lynette angers Georgia by trying to discuss arrangements for the children in case Georgia is convicted. Press pressures Abby into oral sex. Afterward, Abby tells Press she is bulimic; Press is dismissive and leaves quickly. Paul struggles with the gossip surrounding Georgia's trial and warns her lawyer that she may not be telling the whole truth. Abby, believing Sam is also bulimic, asks Sam to touch the tape Abby uses to bind her thighs; Sam confesses she has a crush on Abby, and they kiss. After seeing Ginny off to the dance, Lynette and Georgia share a heart-to-heart and hug. After encouragement from his family, Marcus attends the dance and kisses Ginny. Abby is shocked to see Sam and Press attend the dance together and gets drunk with Marcus in Mr. Gitten's classroom. At home, Abby drunkenly yells at her mother for failing to be a parent after her father left them. Nick tries to quit working for Paul; instead, Paul blackmails him and asks him to divulge everything he knows about Georgia. Flashback shows Georgia going back to Zion again. Lynette pays a visit and keeps insisting on helping Georgia.
24	4	"The Bitch Is Back"	Jasmin Mozaffari	Ali Kinney	June 5, 2025
Abby's mother apologizes but says they both need to improve and sets Abby up with a tutor. Paul, having learned about Georgia's past through Nick, behaves coldly. Georgia learns Gabriel is on the list of witnesses for her prosecution. The school discovers Gitten's classroom was vandalized during the dance; Marcus admits to doing it and is suspended for a month. When Ginny tries to talk to him, Marcus says he does not love her anymore. Marcus confides in Max that he cannot remember anything from the dance, including kissing Ginny, and broke up with her to prioritize his deteriorating mental health. Austin, struggling with school, tries to get suspended as well by vandalizing his classroom. Ginny asks Georgia to enroll him in therapy, but Georgia says they cannot until after the trial. Georgia hosts Lawnfest, a political event to celebrate small businesses that she hopes will rekindle her friendship with Joe, but Joe tells her he still needs space because of his feelings for her. Ginny goes on a date with Wolfe, a boy from her poetry class, but gives him a fake name. On the first day of Georgia's trial, Gabriel takes the stand and accuses her of being a serial killer.
25	5	"Boom Goes the Dynamite"	Liz Allen	Eboni Freeman	June 5, 2025
Gabriel tells the jury about the disappearances of Anthony and Kenny and accuses Georgia of murdering them. His testimony is shared broadly by television news. Gil tries to convince Zion to use the opportunity to get their children back from Georgia. Paul leaves to sleep at his parents' home. To dodge reporters and her classmates, Ginny skips school by going on a date with Wolfe to a science museum. Zion confronts Ginny about Gabriel's testimony, which Ginny accidentally confirms. Neither Paul nor Zion attends the second day of the trial. Georgia's lawyer manages to get Gabriel's testimony thrown out, but reporters continue to harass the family. Ginny discovers a poem she wrote referencing Georgia's crimes has gone viral online. She goes home to self-harm, but Georgia manages to distract and stop her. Wolfe learns Ginny's real name and story, but does not mind. Child protective services arrives, revealing Gil and Zion requested an investigation and the removal of the children from Georgia's care. Flashback shows Georgia deciding that Ginny skips school so that the two can go shopping after learning that Ginny is being bullied for her clothes.
26	6	"At Least It Can't Get Worse"	Liz Allen	Zachary Arthur & Jordan Dumbroff	June 5, 2025
Zion struggles to manage Ginny, who remains upset over his call to CPS. Georgia, defying court orders, drunkenly calls Ginny at night. Ginny tearfully admits to missing her mother but blocks her number to avoid worsening the situation. Ginny attempts to visit Austin at school but is stopped by Gil, leading her to angrily blame Zion, claiming Gil is abusive and responsible for Austin living with him. Later, Ginny attends a party with Wolfe and has sex with him. Marcus visits Georgia to repair a window broken by a brick, telling her Ginny still needs her. In court, Georgia's lawyer suggests Tom's death was an accidental choking, but medical experts dispute this. Feeling despair, Georgia calls Dr. Lily, who reassures her that her children love her and need her to improve her life. Joe visits and asks why she didn't implicate him by revealing his affair with Cynthia; she insists she never would. She also mentions her father, who tried to kill her as a child, contacting her after seeing the news. Meanwhile, Ginny discovers she is pregnant.
27	7	"That's Wild"	Sharon Lewis	Kourtney Richard	June 5, 2025
Georgia's lawyer tells her it is important for her to bring supporters to the courtroom, especially Paul. Georgia tries but fails to do so. Abby develops a crush on her tutor, Tris, but struggles to acknowledge her feelings. Max distracts the reporters in front of Georgia's house so that Ginny can sneak in and tell her that she is pregnant. Georgia helps Ginny take a second test and consider her options. Ginny chooses to have an abortion, but does not want to tell anyone. Georgia asks Marcus to go for support. While Georgia is taking care of Ginny afterward, they learn the trial has been turned into a low-budget film. They inform Zion of the abortion. He reassures Ginny on her choice. Joe visits Georgia, and they nearly kiss, but Joe pulls away. Paul decides to divorce Georgia to save his career, but when he goes to see her, she lies and tells him that she is pregnant, showing him Ginny's pregnancy test. Flashback shows Georgia and the kids now living in the car ("car camping") while Zion is on an overseas trip. Georgia advises Ginny to lie to Zion that they're fine when he calls.
28	8	"Is That a Packed Lunch?"	Sharon Lewis	Danielle Hoover & David Monahan	June 5, 2025
Ginny breaks up with Wolfe, disappointed with his lack of support after learning she was pregnant. Mr. Kay encourages Ginny to submit to a youth poetry contest, which she wins. During play rehearsals, Max grows closer to Sophie and kisses her while Bracia struggles to say "I love you" to Bryon. Cynthia invites Austin to have a playdate with Zach. Abby and Ginny have dinner with Abby's father and Anna, his new girlfriend; Abby is horrified to learn Anna has already moved in. Zion attends therapy with Ginny and learns that Georgia raised her in homelessness; he informs Georgia that he will file for custody. Believing Georgia is pregnant, Paul cancels his plans to divorce her and tries to be a good partner. However, he later realizes she lied while speaking to Zion. Furious, he tells her he and the children are better off without her and punches the wall behind her in anger. Georgia, having given up hopes of winning the case, tells Joe she will run away that night. They confide in each other and have sex. Later, Georgia steals Marcus's motorcycle and cuts off her ankle monitor. She calls Ginny from prison to tell her that she turned herself in. Flashback shows Georgia officially inducted into the motorbike gang by having the gang symbol tattooed on her back.
29	9	"It's Time for My Solo"	Darnell Martin	Sarah Glinski	June 5, 2025
Max worries that Ginny, Norah, and Abby are excluding her. At Ginny's request, Simone agrees to take Georgia's case and encourages her to give the jury reasonable doubt by pinning the murder on Cynthia. Gil tells Ginny that he plans to move Austin to Michigan; when Ginny insults him, he violently grabs her, leaving marks. Cynthia stops him. During prison visits, Georgia warns Ellen that Marcus may be an alcoholic. She tells Joe to forget her, but he promises to keep visiting. At lunch, Max realizes Abby, Ginny, and Norah have been hanging out without her and that Marcus has a drinking problem. Norah tells Ginny that Joe and Cynthia had an affair. Ginny encourages Georgia to use the information to frame Cynthia, only to realize Georgia already knew and refuses to do so. Maxine angers Marcus by telling their parents about his drinking. In court, the defense calls Austin to the witness stand. He shocks the courtroom by lying and stating that Gil murdered Tom. Flashbacks show a younger Max inviting Marcus to hang out with her and her friends. After Max gets reprimanded by Ellen for throwing a "tantrum" after she sees her mom distracted while she and the others are doing a skit, Marcus cheers her up.
30	10	"Monsters"	Darnell Martin	Sarah Lampert	June 5, 2025
On the stand, Cynthia agrees it is possible that Gil murdered Tom. The jury decides in Georgia's favor, and the news declares Georgia the true victim. Paul faces public backlash and is recalled. He fires Nick. Max struggles when she feels left out by her friends. Marcus kisses Ginny and tells her he still loves her. Georgia tells Joe that all of the details exposed during her trial are true and that she does not want to lie to him. Ellen drives Marcus to rehab. Ginny notices Georgia drinking a glass of milk at home, and remembers that Georgia once told her that she only drank milk when she was pregnant. Flashbacks show Ginny meeting with Austin and Cynthia before the trial.

== Cast and characters ==
=== Main ===
- Brianne Howey as Georgia Miller
  - Nikki Roumel as young Georgia Miller
- Antonia Gentry as Ginny Miller
- Diesel La Torraca as Austin Miller
- Jennifer Robertson as Ellen Baker
- Felix Mallard as Marcus Baker
- Sara Waisglass as Maxine Baker
- Scott Porter as Mayor Paul Randolph
- Raymond Ablack as Joe Singh
- Katie Douglas as Abby Littman
- Chelsea Clark as Norah Cohen
- Nathan Mitchell as Zion Miller

=== Recurring ===
- Romi Shraiter as Samantha
- Sabrina Grdevich as Cynthia Fuller
- Alex Mallari Jr. as PI Gabriel Cordova
- Dan Beirne as Nick Throop
- Tameka Griffiths as Bracia Charles
- Rebecca Ablack as Padma Atlurie
- Damian Romeo as Matt Press
- Noah Lamanna as Tris
- Ty Doran as Wolfe
- Vinessa Antoine as Simone
- Aaron Ashmore as Gil Timmins
- Karen LeBlanc as Lynette Miller

== Production ==
=== Development and casting ===
The production of the third season of Ginny & Georgia started in Toronto, Canada, after the series was renewed by Netflix. The series, which was created by Sarah Lampert, continues to feature the main characters portrayed by Brianne Howey and Antonia Gentry, playing the roles of Georgia Miller and Ginny. Other characters' members include Felix Mallard as Marcus Baker, Sara Waisglass as Maxine Baker, Diesel La Torraca as Austin Miller, Jennifer Robertson as Ellen Baker, Scott Porter as Mayor Paul Randolph, Raymond Ablack as Joe, Katie Douglas as Abby Littman, Chelsea Clark as Norah, Sabrina Grdevich as Cynthia Fuller, and Nathan Mitchell as Zion Miller, who also returned. This continuity enabled the show to deepen existing relationships and expand character arcs, especially for the MANG group and Ginny's family dynamics.

New recurring cast members were added to the cast of Season 3 to aid the story. Ty Doran played the role of Wolfe, a member of the school's poetry class and a possible love interest for Ginny, portrayed as a intellectual and supportive person. Noah Lamanna played the role of Tris, a skater and tutor, and a person who relates to Abby as she struggles with body issues and loneliness.

In discussing the direction of the new season, Lampert said that the story will be a continuation of the second season's season finale, where Georgia Miller gets arrested on suspicion of murder on her wedding day.

For the season, Sarah Glinski, known for Degrassi: The Next Generation, took over as a showrunner and executive producer replacing Debra J. Fisher. Along with Jeff Tahler for Madica Productions, Jenny Daly for Critical Content, Holly Hines and Daniel March for Dynamic Television, and Lance Samuels, Daniel Iron, and Armand Leo for Blue Ice Pictures. Elena Blekhter acts as a co-executive producer.

=== Writing ===
To create the season's storylines, the writers chose to expand the scope of the writing to incorporate Austin Miller as a central part of the family's narrative. In the earlier seasons, the writing centered on Ginny & Georgia, but the season delves into the emotional and psychological effects of the family's situation on Austin, who was initially a secondary character. In this writing, the audience is shown the effects of neglect and family conflicts on a child's perspective. According to Diesel La Torraca, the writing of the third season brought more intense situations that were emotionally challenging for the character. In this season, Austin is shown dealing with the consequences of witnessing violent acts from his parents. In one part of the writing, Austin is shown as Ginny's accomplice in the plan to frame their father, Gil, for the crime of harming Georgia.

A Teen Vogue feature noted the team's effort to portray the mother-daughter dynamic with emotional honesty while preserving the series' fast-paced, sharp dialogue.

=== Filming ===
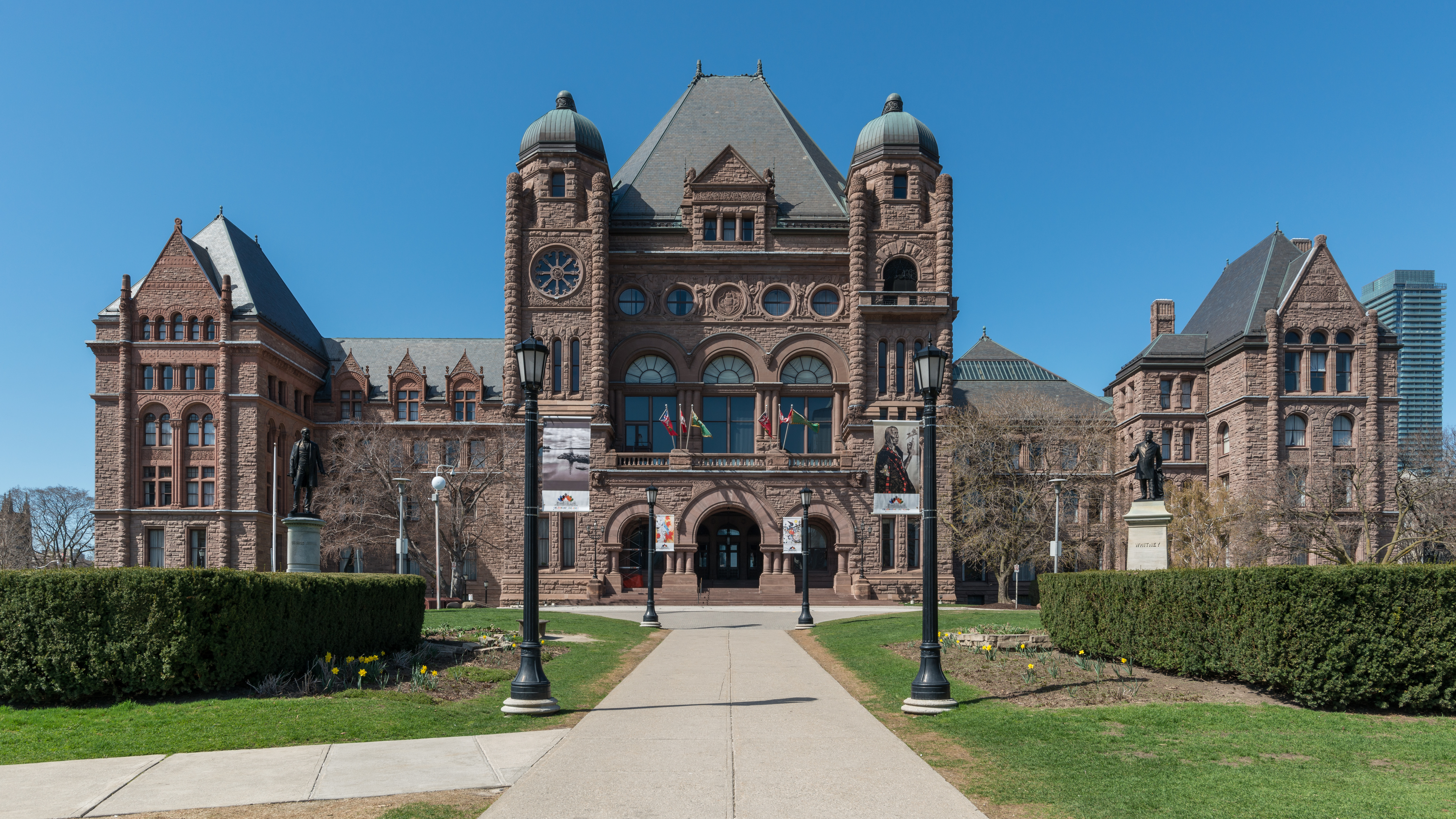
Exterior of the Ontario Legislative Building in Toronto, Ontario, Canada, one of the filming locations of the show, as seen in April 2017.

Principal photography took place in Cobourg and Toronto, which are both located in Ontario, Canada. Scenes shot in Cobourg include the outdoors scenes that gave the feel of the small town as well as the lake scenes and civic scenes of the fictional town of Wellsbury, Massachusetts. Scenes shot in Toronto include interior scenes, residential scenes, and a few establishing scenes. Filming required the use of various filming techniques to effectively execute the scenes. The crew closed down streets and parks in Cobourg when filming scenes, as well as including background actors. The scenes in Cobourg included Victoria Hall, where they portrayed the Wellsbury Town Hall, King Street West scenes, such as the Blue Farm Café, and Victoria Park, where they portrayed scenes in civic events. The scenes in Toronto included Baby Point Crescent, where they portrayed the Miller family home, Etienne Brulé Park, where they portrayed scenes in Wellsbury High School, and the Nelson A. Boylen Collegiate Institute, where they portrayed scenes in Wellsbury High School.

They shot in TriBro Studios, where they had multiple sound stages and office space. They built custom sets in the studio, to portray scenes in homes, offices, and schools. Some scenes were shot in real locations, such as Audrey's In Town Fashion, located in Cobourg, and the EZ Lube Automobile Service, located in Scarborough. The crew had 120 crew members, 45 background people, and 40 production vehicles.

Production faced initial delays due to the 2023 WGA and SAG-AFTRA strikes, impacting industry schedules. However, with scripts completed before the strikes began, filming resumed on schedule after negotiations concluded in late 2023. The delay allowed extra time to prepare sets, secure permits, and ensure visual continuity, especially for complex courtroom and domestic scenes.

== Reception ==
=== Viewership ===
The season rose to the top of Netflix's global rankings. In its first four days, it recorded approximately 17.6 million Complete Viewing Equivalents (CVEs), a Netflix metric for full-season viewings debuting at number one on the English-language TV chart and exceeding the previous third-season launch record set by Outer Banks. According to Netflix’s weekly Top 10 data for June 2–8, 2025, the season maintained 17.6 million CVEs, holding its top spot. By the week ending June 16, it added 8.1 million views, with Season 1 and Season 2 also placing at #8 and #2, respectively. Across all seasons, the series totaled over 248 million viewing hours in a single week during June 2025.

=== Critical response ===
On the review aggregator website Rotten Tomatoes, 75% of 16 critics' reviews are positive, with an average rating of 3.0/10. The website's consensus reads: "Focused by a clearer throughline that doesn't skimp on melodrama, Ginny & Georgia's third season is still uneven but pulls off its most successful mix of froth and seriousness yet." Metacritic, which uses a weighted average, assigned the film a score of 55 out of 100, based on 6 critic reviews, indicating "mixed or average" responses.
