= Ginny & Georgia season 2 =

2023 television season

Ginny & Georgia
- Season 2
- Promotional poster
- Showrunner: Debra J. Fisher
- Starring: Antonia Gentry; Brianne Howey; Diesel La Torraca; Scott Porter; Felix Mallard; Jennifer Robertson
- No. of episodes: 10

Release
- Original network: Netflix
- Original release: January 5, 2023

Season chronology
- ← Previous; Season 1 Next → Season 3

The second season of Ginny & Georgia, an American comedy-drama television series created by Sarah Lampert, premiered on January 5, 2023. The season centers around the main characters Georgia (Brianne Howey) and Ginny (Antonia Gentry) as they try to rebuild their lives in Wellsbury after all that has been revealed and conflicts that arose in the first season. Ginny is dealing with emotional fallout from learning about her mother’s past, and Georgia is trying to keep a sense of normalcy in her rebuilt family life while also dealing with the possibility that her past could come back to haunt her.

The season aired on Thursdays at 9:00 pm ET in the United States, and was aired on the streaming service Netflix. Unlike traditional broadcast series, all ten episodes were made available simultaneously on the platform rather than airing weekly on a television network. The season also stars Diesel La Torraca, Scott Porter, Felix Mallard, Jennifer Robertson, Sara Waisglass, Raymond Ablack, Katie Douglas, Chelsea Clark, and Nathan Mitchell appear in recurring roles.

Season two was met with Generally Favorable acclaim upon release. And received numerous award nominations. Actress Antonia Gentry received a nomination at the MTV Movie & TV Awards for Breakthrough Performance for her work on the show. The season received numerous award, winning one AACTA Awards, and one CAFTCAD Awards. At the 55th NAACP Image Awards, Kale Futterman was nominated for Outstanding Breakthrough Creative (Television). The series was also nominated for The Drama Show of the Year at the 49th People's Choice Awards. The season received much analysis from critics and audiences, with particular praise directed toward Howey and Gentry's mother-daughter relationship.

== Premise ==
After the shocking events of the Season 1 finale, The Season picks up with Ginny Miller fleeing Wellsbury with her younger brother Austin, reeling from the revelation that their mother, Georgia, murdered her ex-husband. The two children seek refuge with their father, Zion, while Georgia attempts to carry on with her engagement to Mayor Paul Randolph and maintain her image as a respectable member of the community. However, the cracks in Georgia’s carefully curated life begin to widen as her past threatens to catch up with her.

Back in Wellsbury, Ginny returns home but struggles with the emotional weight of keeping her mother’s secret. She begins attending therapy to cope with her mental health challenges, including anxiety and self-harm. At school, her friendships with Max, Abby, and Norah are strained, and her romantic relationship with Marcus becomes increasingly complicated.

Meanwhile, Georgia faces escalating threats to her family’s safety and freedom. Gil, Austin’s abusive father, is released from prison and begins reentering their lives, further complicating Georgia’s efforts to protect her children. Simultaneously, a private investigator continues to probe into the mysterious circumstances surrounding the death of Georgia’s late husband. As pressure mounts from all sides. Georgia and Paul’s wedding, facade finally collapses when Georgia is arrested for murder.

== Episodes ==
No. overall	No. in season	Title	Directed by	Written by	Original release date
11	1	"Welcome Back, Bitches!"	James Genn	Sarah Lampert & Debra J. Fisher	January 5, 2023
For the past 2 weeks, Ginny and Austin have been living with Zion in Boston. Ginny's grandparents come to Zion's house for Thanksgiving dinner, and Ginny overhears them expressing concerns about her mental well-being as they leave. Georgia goes with Paul to his parents' house for Thanksgiving dinner and overhears them talk about how she has too much "baggage", though he is insistent on marrying her. Ginny continues to burn herself. Ginny has a panic attack when she finds out that she has to see Georgia again. She confides in Zion about her self-harm and asks if she can keep living with him, which he agrees to on the conditions that he tell Georgia about it and Ginny go to therapy. Zion, Georgia, Paul, Ginny, and Austin have an awkward dinner. Georgia confronts Ginny about thinking she is an 'evil mom'. Zion tells Georgia that Ginny is moving in with him, but she refuses to allow it, so he attempts to tell her about Ginny's self-harm. To stop him, Ginny agrees to move back home. Gabriel discovers that Georgia was previously married to a man named Anthony Green, who went missing. Marcus climbs into Ginny's room, and the two share a deep conversation before Ginny asks him to stay the night. Flashbacks show Georgia coming home on the night of the election to find her kids gone and her wolfsbane flowers burned. They also show Georgia working on Thanksgiving and inventing Friyay so Ginny could still have a nice holiday.
12	2	"Why Does Everything Have to Be So Terrible, All the Time, Forever?"	James Genn	Danielle Hoover & David Monahan	January 5, 2023
Georgia asks Paul to move in, agreeing not to tell the kids yet, but she ends up telling them anyway. On Ginny's first day back at school, her friends ignore her. Georgia plans to join the Neighborhood Club but finds out she needs a current member to sponsor her, so she visits Cynthia, whose husband is terminally ill. Zion takes Ginny to her first therapy session, where she talks about her childhood and her self-harm. Nick confronts Georgia about her embezzling, but she reminds him that telling Paul about it would eliminate his plausible deniability. Cynthia tells the Neighborhood Club not to let Georgia in. Paul tells Ginny that he wants to be there for her and Austin, mentioning that Austin's father, Gil, took out credit cards in his name. The next morning, Ginny makes Paul a smoothie, reminding Georgia of the one that she killed Kenny with. Flashbacks show Georgia going to her old biker gang, traumatized, to get rid of Anthony Green's body after accidentally killing him.
13	3	"What Are You Playing at, Little Girl?"	Audrey Cummings	Mike Gauyo	January 5, 2023
Tensions rise after Georgia learns that Ginny knows what happened to Kenny. Austin's teacher tells Georgia that Austin is behind in class and that he might have anxiety and need counseling, but Georgia brushes it off. Marcus asks Ginny why she has been so secretive lately, but she brushes him off, so he leaves. She struggles to tell him about her feelings, so she writes a poem for him. Abby and Ginny skip class and smoke together. Georgia finally convinces Cynthia to get her into the Neighborhood Club. Ginny finally confesses to Marcus that Georgia killed Kenny, and he promises not to tell anyone. Georgia tells her that she killed him to protect her family and would do it again if necessary; the two make up. Flashbacks show Georgia failing to make friends with Ginny at her side. She uses her to steal clothes.
14	4	"Happy My Birthday to You"	Audrey Cummings	Anil K. Foreman	January 5, 2023
After Ginny and Georgia make up, Georgia catches Marcus sneaking in and talks about his intentions with Ginny. Ginny plans a party for Marcus's birthday. Paul and Georgia clash about parenting techniques. Max struggles with still having feelings for Sophie, who now has a boyfriend, and is oblivious to a girl named Silver liking her. Not wanting to see Tom because he's forgotten her name, Cynthia stays at Blue Farm all day and bonds with Joe, who is struggling with his unrequited love for Georgia. Georgia asks Ginny to be her maid of honor. Norah makes up with Abby and Ginny, disappointing Max. Gabriel discovers that Georgia was never investigated regarding Anthony Green's death. Marcus asks Ginny to be his girlfriend. Ginny calls her therapist to stop herself from self-harming and has a mental breakdown. Flashbacks show Georgia lying about Ginny being sick so they can stay in the house longer.
15	5	"Latkes Are Lit"	Danishka Esterhazy	Kale Futterman	January 5, 2023
Georgia is planning the wedding, a Neighborhood Club party, and a fundraiser for women and children. Ginny's English teacher asks her to pick a book to add to the syllabus about the Black American experience. Georgia apologizes to Nick and asks him to be her bridesman. Georgia arranges for Zion and Paul to meet and talk things out. Ginny and her therapist talk about Georgia as a mother. Paul argues with Georgia about a gun he found in the house. Georgia attempts to get Ginny's English teacher fired by framing him, but Ginny stops her in time. At an open mic at Blue Farm, Ginny reads a poem about her negative feelings toward Georgia, who walks in and is upset after hearing it. Cynthia kisses Joe, but instantly regrets it. Gil arrives at Austin's school. Flashbacks show Georgia giving a hungry Ginny her food. Her plans for a babysitter fall through, so her date, Gil, comes in, and they get a delivery.
16	6	"A Very Merry Ginny & Georgia Christmas Special"	Danishka Esterhazy	Angela Nissel	January 5, 2023
Georgia is still upset about Ginny's poem and stressed about having Paul's family over for Christmas Eve. Ginny and Georgia walk in on Zion on a date with his girlfriend Simone, and Georgia panics and accidentally invites Zion's family to the Christmas Eve dinner. Austin finds a gun when looking for presents. Gabriel discovers that Georgia's lawyer has a connection to her old gang. Joe cheers her up, and she makes up with Paul. Cynthia and Joe have sex. Gil arrives on Christmas Day and claims he's changed. Georgia reads Ginny's notebook and discovers that she self-harms. Flashbacks show Gil buying gifts for Georgia and Ginny.
17	7	"Let Us Serenade the Sh*t Out of You"	Sharon Lewis	Danielle Hoover & David Monahan	January 5, 2023
Georgia tries to become a better mother and confronts Zion for not telling her about Ginny's self-harm. Gil tries to become part of Austin's life, but fails to convince Georgia he's changed. Ginny's English teacher tells Ginny to lead a lesson on the book, so she drops out of his class. Marcus begins to act differently and comes to school drunk. Georgia joins Ginny's therapy session, and they both feel misunderstood by the other. Gil tells Cynthia that Georgia framed him for the embezzlement she did so that he would get sent to prison. Ginny throws Georgia a surprise bachelorette party. Flashbacks show Gil telling Georgia that he embezzles from his company. Georgia wears face paint as Zion and Gil meet on Ginny's birthday. After they leave, she removes the face paint, revealing that Gil has physically abused her.
18	8	"Hark! Darkness Descends!"	Sharon Lewis	Megan Hartenstein & Jordan Dumbroff	January 5, 2023
Marcus is revealed to have depression. Cynthia realizes that Joe likes Georgia and ends things with him amicably. Ginny leads a revolt against the English teacher. Cynthia helps Georgia when Gil gets physical with her. Gabriel tells Ginny about Anthony. Georgia suffocates Cynthia's husband, Tom, killing him. Unbeknownst to her, Austin witnesses this. Ginny tells Marcus she knows he doesn't want to be with her, and he breaks up with her. Max and Silver kiss. Max and Marcus hear a gunshot. Flashbacks show Joe standing up to a bully.
19	9	"Kill Gil"	Rose Troche	Debra J. Fisher & Sarah Lampert	January 5, 2023
Three days earlier, Ginny struggles to get used to her new English class as the other students don't take it seriously. Nick feels Gabriel is pulling away. Georgia tells Ginny about Anthony, saying it was an accident. Gil blackmails Georgia into letting him see Austin. Cynthia tells Georgia about sleeping with Joe. Gil physically assaults Georgia, so Austin shoots him with the gun he found. They clean up the house and sew Gil's arm up before Paul gets home. Georgia tells the kids about Gil's abuse over the years, but chooses not to tell Paul. She calls the wedding company and cancels. Gabriel finds out that Georgia was with Tom when he died and reports it to the police as a suspected murder. Flashbacks show Georgia packing to run away from Gil, but finding out she's pregnant before she can leave.
20	10	"I'm No Cinderella"	Rose Troche	Sarah Lampert & Debra J. Fisher	January 5, 2023
Ginny finds out that Georgia cancelled the wedding and convinces her to tell Paul everything so they wouldn't have to leave; Georgia does so. Paul, angry and overwhelmed, leaves the house, but later texts Georgia and asks her to meet him in the office. Gil also arrives, and Paul tells him that he is a convicted felon and will go back to prison if he continues to harass and blackmail Georgia. Gabriel tells Nick the truth about his identity and Georgia's crimes. Paul and Georgia get married, and Ginny gives her maid of honor speech at the reception. Georgia gets arrested in the middle of her first dance with Paul for Tom's murder. As she is taken away in a police car, Austin is confused and upset, saying he didn't tell anyone about what he saw the night Tom died. Flashbacks show Gil throwing Georgia to the ground, and Georgia threatening Gil with a gun, before Gil wrestles it out of her hands.

== Cast and characters ==
=== Main ===
- Brianne Howey as Georgia Miller
- Antonia Gentry as Ginny Miller
- Diesel La Torraca as Austin Miller
- Jennifer Robertson as Ellen Baker
- Felix Mallard as Marcus Baker
- Sara Waisglass as Maxine Baker
- Scott Porter as Mayor Paul Randolph
- Raymond Ablack as Joe Singh
- Katie Douglas as Abby Littman
- Chelsea Clark as Norah Cohen

=== Recurring ===
- Nathan Mitchell as Zion Miller
- Dan Beirne as Nick Throop
- Alex Mallari Jr. as Gabriel Cordova
- Colton Gobbo as Jordan
- Tyssen Smith as Brodie
- Damian Romeo as Matt Press
- Mason Temple as Hunter Chen
- Rebecca Ablack as Padma Atlurie
- Aaron Ashmore as Gil Timmins

== Production ==
=== Development and writing ===
Following the success of its debut season, Ginny & Georgia was renewed for a second season by Netflix on April 19, 2021. Sarah Lampert and Debra J. Fisher continued to serve as executive producers and showrunner. Alongside production companies Queen Fish Productions, Critical Content ,Dynamic Television and Madica Productions.

The writers’ room focused heavily on character-driven storytelling. Fisher explained that the series aims to portray characters as “complicated, nuanced, and layered,” allowing them to make mistakes and behave inconsistently in ways that reflect real human behavior.

The second season’s storylines were influenced by the writers’ room members’ personal experiences. Lampert explained that “some of the emotional aspects and the situations that the characters find themselves in were based on people’s personal experiences. That’s why the show felt so grounded.” One of the major themes tackled by the writers in the second season was the exploration of mental health issues. The show consulted with a psychologist named Dr. Taji Huang and also collaborated with the Mental Health America organization.

The writers also developed storylines exploring Marcus’s depression and Ginny’s struggles with self-harm, aiming to present these issues as ongoing experiences rather than episodic plot devices. Fisher explained that the series deliberately avoids the structure of an “issue-of-the-week” drama, preferring to allow emotional arcs to unfold gradually across the season.

=== Narrative direction ===
The second season adopted a darker and more introspective tone than the first season. According to Lampert , the writers of the show had concentrated on characterizing how the characters deal with their trauma, complicated relationships, and the repercussions of their past actions. The writers had also developed the secondary characters and their relationships, including Ginny’s friendships and Georgia’s romantic relationships. This is to further explore the concept of family and the repercussions of Georgia’s past actions.

=== Filming ===
Principal photography for Ginny & Georgia Season 2 began in February 2022, with filming taking place in locations including Cobourg, Ontario later that month. The first two episodes of the season, titled "(Welcome Back, Bitches!)" and "(Why Does Everything Have to Be So Terrible, All the Time, Forever)?", were directed by James Genn, along with rotating directors Danishka Esterhazy and Audrey Cummings. Cinematography included warmer tones and moody lighting for dramatic scenes, notably in therapy sessions and flashbacks, with enhanced visual storytelling, particularly in Marcus’ depression arc.

Production encountered occasional COVID-19-related delays and restrictions, necessitating a hybrid workflow with remote writing sessions and on-set safety measures.

=== Casting ===
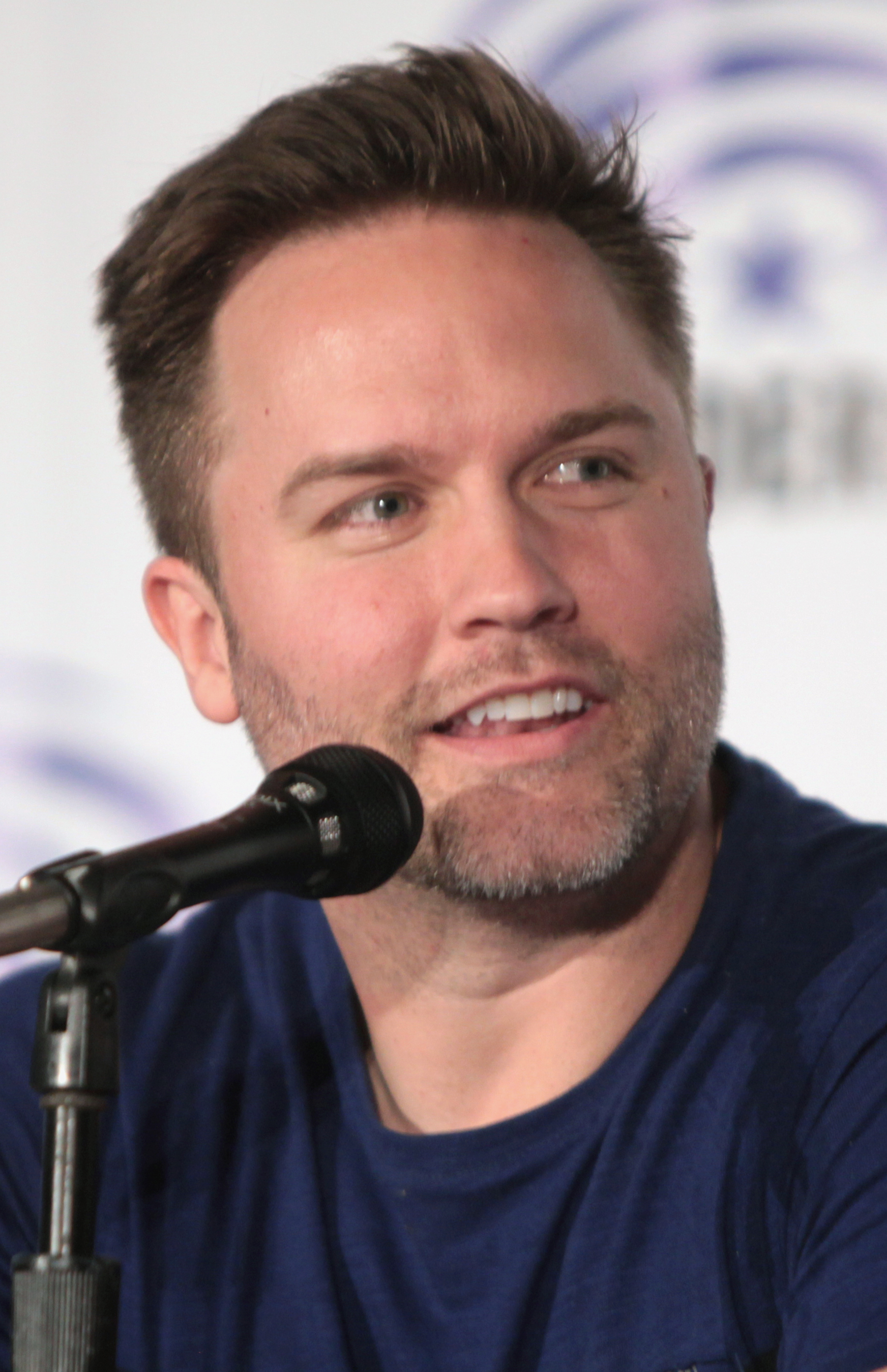
Scott Porter portrays the Mayor of Wellsbury

Antonia Gentry and Brianne Howey continued to appear as the series' titular protagonist Ginny and Georgia, respectively. Diesel La Torraca, Felix Mallard , Sara Waisglass, Scott Porter , and Jennifer Robertson also returned for the season. Season two also includes multiple recurring character, such as Raymond Ablack as Joe, Chelsea Clark as Norah, Katie Douglas as Abby, and Nathan Mitchell as Zion.

New additions to the cast included Aaron Ashmore as Gil Timmins, Georgia’s abusive ex and Austin’s father. Ashmore’s, and Daniel Beirne, as Nick’s, added LGBTQ+ representation to Georgia's workplace. The season also introduced new characters including Tameka Griffiths, as Bracia Ginny’s best friend.

=== Marketing ===
Promotion for the second season of Ginny & Georgia began following its renewal by Netflix in April 2021. Series creator Sarah Lampert and showrunner Debra J. Fisher confirmed that the new season would consist of ten episodes and acknowledged the positive response from viewers. Netflix released trailers and promotional videos on December, 2022, featuring returning cast members, including Brianne Howey and Antonia Gentry, along with other principal actors. Interviews and media coverage highlighted the continuation of the story from the first season’s finale and introduced key plot elements without revealing detailed spoilers.

=== Music ===
The music used in Ginny & Georgia Season 2 combines original score, composed by Lili Haydn and Ben Bromfield, to a variety of other licensed tracks, depending on the emotional context of the scenes portrayed in the series. For "Welcome Back Bitches!" flashbacks scenes, "Pretty Ugly" by Tierra Whack was used when "[Georgia] invented the Miller family tradition of "Fry-Yay".

The score ranges from the use of live instruments to the inclusion of synthesized sounds. In addition to the original score, the series used a variety of other songs, ranging from pop to other forms of music, by artists such as Justin Bieber, Tierra Whack, and others, at specific points in the series. Holiday music was also used prominently in the series, particularly in the Christmas-themed episode, For example, when Marcus chooses not to go downstairs to spend time with family during Thanksgiving. "I Hate It" was used for the scene that is centred around the holiday season.

The original score has been used prominently in the high school musical performances, where the two composers have used their extensive experience in the music field to create the most authentic score, given their extensive experience in the field. The score used in the high school performances ranges from the use of live instruments, including strings, woodwinds, piano, percussion, and vocals, where the actors were given training to enhance their performances.

Season Two: Netflix Original Series Soundtrack

Soundtrack album by Lili Haydn
- Released: January 6, 2023
- Length: 27:06
- Labels: Netflix Music; LLC

All music is composed by Lili Haydn:

Track listing
No.	Title	Length
1.	"The Comedown (Padma's Song)" (featuring Rebecca Ablack)	2:32
2.	"Georgia Gets Booked"	1:46
3.	"Georgia and Paul's First Dance"	2:09
4.	"Georgia's Theme (Dark)" (featuring Benjamin Walker)	1:33
5.	"Ben and Lili's Christmas Extravaganza"	2:00
6.	"Wedding Shopping"	0:39
7.	"Sandstorm at the Well"	1:46
8.	"Hug a Bully"	1:08
9.	"Childs Play (Hunter's Song)" (featuring Nick Leclair Throop, Mason Temple & Rebecca Ablack)	2:49
10.	"Not A Murderer"	1:18
11.	"Welcome Back Bitches"	2:02
12.	"Curtain Call"	0:43
13.	"I'd Never Love Someone (Bracia's Ballad)" (featuring Tameka Griffiths)	2:36
14.	"Austin Hides In The Closet"	0:54
15.	"Marriage Is A Dungeon (Max and Bracia's Duet)" (featuring Sara Waisglass & Tameka Griffiths)	2:00
16.	"Max and Bracia Backstage"	0:23
17.	"To The Dance (Wellington Opener)" (featuring Tameka Griffiths, Sara Waisglass & Agape Mngomezulu)	2:03
18.	"Wellsbury"	2:02
Total length:		27:06

== Release ==
The season premiered on Netflix on January 5, 2023, with all ten episodes dropping simultaneously.

== Reception ==
=== Audience viewership ===
The season reached high viewership. During its first three weeks, the series reportedly accumulated over 430 million hours viewed, with 47 million households watching. The season remained at the top of Netflix’s English-language TV chart for four consecutive weeks and continued to attract substantial audiences in multiple regions.

The season received 38.1 million more viewing hours by the week of January 30–February 5, 2023, making a total of over 504 million hours. And ranked second on the weekly Top 10 chart and entered Netflix’s all-time list of most popular English-language TV shows at No. 10. Its first season also maintained a presence in the top ten, contributing an additional 22.5 million hours during the same period.

=== Nielsen ratings ===
Nielsen ratings reported that Ginny & Georgia was the most-watched streaming title in the U.S. during the week of its premiere, recording over 2.5 billion minutes of viewing time. It topped the streaming charts for several weeks, outperforming other popular series on both Netflix and competing platforms.

=== Critical response ===
Professional ratings
Aggregate scores
Source	Rating
Metacritic	71/100
Rotten Tomatoes	84%
Review scores
Source	Rating
Collider	B+
The A.V. Club	C+
The Times of India	3.5/5

On the review aggregator Rotten Tomatoes, the season has an approval rating of 98% based on 25 reviews. The site's consensus reads "Ginny & Georgia continues to strain credulity in its search for topical drama, but fans of the first season ought to still enjoy this sudsy sophomore outing. On Metacritic, which uses a weighted average, the season holds a score of 71 out of 100 based on 5 reviews, indicating "Generally Favorable".

Rae Torres of Collider offered a balanced review, praising the season’s emotional depth and multilayered performances, especially from Antonia Gentry and Brianne Howey but critiqued the narrative when it favored "cheap thrill" over character focus. The review noted that the series shines "when it focuses on its core relationships," while other plot elements sometimes detract from its emotional core. In a review for The A.V. Club, Christina Izzo criticized the series for its tonal shifts, stating that Ginny & Georgia attempts to combine multiple genres, including suburban drama, thriller, and young adult coming-of-age, but often loses focus. Izzo commented that “Season 2 needs more Ginny, less Georgia,” and suggested that the series would benefit from a more concentrated emotional focus. In a review for Decider, Liz Kocan stated that the second season showed improvement, highlighting Antonia Gentry’s performance and the tension created by the characters’ complex relationships.

Vanguard News commented on the second season, pointing out the increased drama among the teens, the complicated family situations, and the unfolding secrets that drive the story. Daniel Hart of Ready Steady Cut noted the season’s energetic pacing and the dynamic between Ginny and Georgia, while also mentioning that the storyline could feel overextended. In The Daily Beast, Laura Bradley described Season 2 as a shift toward darker themes, highlighting Ginny’s increased time with her father, Zion, and her exploration of identity and personal trauma through therapy.” Sreeparna Sengupta of The Times of India described Season 2 as achieving strong viewership for a Thursday release, highlighting its depiction of mental health and emotional recovery, including struggles with self-harm and depression.

=== Accolades ===
The season received several nominations at major awards shows. At the 2023 MTV Movie & TV Awards, Ginny & Georgia was nominated for Best Show, while Antonia Gentry received a nomination for Breakthrough Performance. The series also received a nomination for Outstanding Drama Series at the 2023 GLAAD Media Awards for its inclusive representation of LGBTQ+ characters.

=== Awards and nominations ===
Year	Award	Category	Nominee(s)	Result	Ref.
2023	MTV Movie & TV Awards	Best Television Show	Ginny & Georgia Season 2	Nominated	
2023	MTV Movie & TV Awards	Breakthrough Performance	Antonia Gentry	Nominated	
2024	13th AACTA Awards	Audience Choice Award for Favourite Television Show	Ginny & Georgia Season 2	Won	
2024	55th NAACP Image Awards	Outstanding Breakthrough Creative (Television)	Kale Futterman	Nominated	
2024	49th People's Choice Awards	The Drama Show of the Year	Ginny & Georgia Season 2	Nominated	
2025	The CAFTCAD awards	Best Costume Design in TV Contemporary - East	Julia Patkos	Won	
