= Ginny & Georgia =

2021 American comedy-drama television series

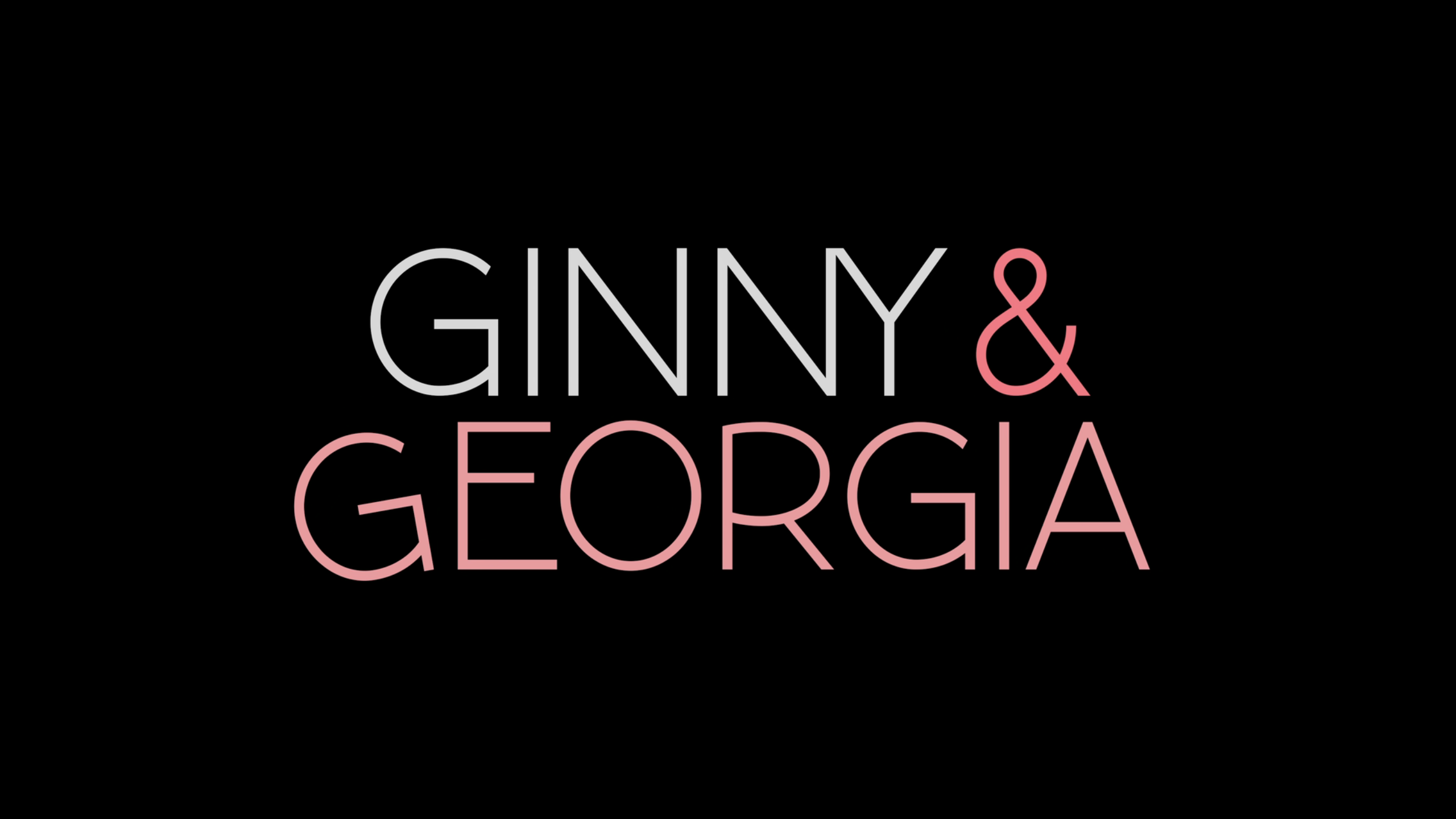
- Genre: Comedy drama
- Created by: Sarah Lampert
- Showrunners: Debra J. Fisher; Sarah Glinski
- Starring: Brianne Howey; Antonia Gentry; Diesel La Torraca; Jennifer Robertson; Felix Mallard; Sara Waisglass; Scott Porter; Raymond Ablack; Katie Douglas; Chelsea Clark; Nathan Mitchell
- Music by: Lili Haydn & Ben Bromfield
- Country of origin: United States
- Original language: English
- No. of seasons: 3
- No. of episodes: 30

Production
- Executive producers: Debra J. Fisher; Sarah Lampert; Anya Adams; Jeff Tahler; Jenny Daly; Dan March; Holly Hines; Lance Samuels; Daniel Iron; Armand Leo; James Genn; Angela Nissel; Sarah Glinski
- Producers: Claire Welland; Todd Aronauer; Reggie Rob; Bonnie Adams; Ebonie Freeman
- Production locations: Toronto, Ontario; Cobourg, Ontario
- Cinematography: Gavin Smith; Asaf Benny
- Editors: Erin Deck; Susan Shipton; Jonathan Eagan; Aren Hansen; Christopher Minns; Tiffany Beaudin; Lauren Brandon
- Running time: 50–68 minutes
- Production companies: Queen Fish Productions; Critical Content; Dynamic Television; Madica

Original release
- Network: Netflix
- Release: February 24, 2021 – present

Ginny & Georgia is an American comedy-drama television series created by Sarah Lampert. The series follows the life of thirty‑one‑year‑old Georgia Miller (portrayed by Brianne Howey) and her teenage children, Ginny (Antonia Gentry) and Austin (Diesel La Torraca), as they relocate to the fictional town of Wellsbury, Massachusetts. The series blends elements of teen drama, family dynamics, mystery, and darker themes.

The first season of Ginny & Georgia premiered on Netflix on February 24, 2021, with a second and third season following in January 2023 and June 2025, respectively. In May 2023, the series was renewed for a fourth season which is slated to premiere on January 21, 2027.

There were 52 million subscribers who watched the first season of the series for the first 28 days after its release. Upon its debut, Ginny & Georgia drew comparisons to Gilmore Girls for its quick-witted mother-daughter dynamic but carved its own path with a blend of heartfelt family scenes, dramatic turns and events. It has prompted widespread discussion on themes such as identity, mental health, family secrets, and moral ambiguity. The casting drew attention after season 3, with media noting several teen actors were older than their characters.

== Premise ==
Set in the quiet town of Wellsbury, Massachusetts, the series follows Georgia Miller's attempt to establish a new life for her family after years of evading trouble. Georgia, a free-spirited yet secretive single mother, seeks to provide stability for her children. Her daughter, Ginny, a mixed-race teenager, faces challenges fitting in and exploring her identity. Her younger son, Austin, adds humor but also family tensions. As Georgia's hidden past emerges, the family confronts secrets, lies, and moral issues from their earlier lives.

== Cast and characters ==
=== Main ===
- Brianne Howey as Georgia (Mary) Miller, the young single mother of Ginny and Austin; as a survivor of child abuse and a teen mother, she has fled many places around the country when her relationships led her and her children into danger. She is very resourceful and determined to protect her children in any way possible, and give them the life she never had.
  - Nikki Roumel as young Georgia Miller
- Antonia Gentry as Virginia "Ginny" Miller, Georgia's teenage daughter, who has never lived in a place long enough to form solid friendships, and therefore struggles to make friends. Instability at home and her lack of belonging causes her to feel overwhelmed and resort to self-harm through burning. Poetry helps her cope with these intense emotions. Besides poetry, she also enjoys speaking Korean and playing the piano. She is mixed-race and struggles with her identity being in a white town and white family.
- Diesel La Torraca as Austin Miller, Georgia's son and Ginny's younger half-brother, who has a vivid imagination and deep love for Harry Potter and magic. He is shy, anxious, and struggles to fit in at school. He's extremely loyal to his family and isn't afraid to act with aggression when defending them. He has a close bond with his step-father Paul, and later befriends his former bully, Zach. His growing interest in hockey stems from time spent with his father, Gil.
- Jennifer Robertson as Ellen Baker, the Millers' neighbor who befriends Georgia and is the mother of Marcus and Max Baker
- Felix Mallard as Marcus Baker, Ellen's teenage son, Max's fraternal twin brother, and Ginny's love interest. He is a talented artist and likes spending time alone. After losing his best friend to cancer, he struggles with depression, leading him to withdraw from others. He copes by smoking weed and drinking alcohol.
- Sara Waisglass as Maxine "Max" Baker, Ellen's lesbian teenage daughter, Marcus' fraternal twin sister, and Ginny's new best friend, who cares deeply but can lash out on her friends
- Scott Porter as Mayor Paul Randolph, the mayor of Wellsbury, Massachusetts, who is up for reelection in season 2. The town's most eligible bachelor becomes Georgia's love interest and eventual husband (later ex-husband), and he develops a close bond with Austin.
- Raymond Ablack as Joe, the owner of a local farm-to-table restaurant called Blue Farm Café, who briefly knew Georgia as a teenager and develops romantic feelings for her after she moves to Wellsbury. He is very kind and generous and employs Ginny.
- Katie Douglas as Abigail "Abby" Littman (season 2–present, recurring season 1), a friend of Max and Ginny and part of the MANG (Max-Abby-Norah-Ginny) group who is insecure about herself and her body and struggling greatly with her parents' divorce
- Chelsea Clark as Norah (season 2–present, recurring season 1), a friend of Max and Ginny and part of MANG
- Nathan Mitchell as Zion Miller (season 3, recurring season 1–2), Georgia's ex-boyfriend and Ginny's biological father

=== Recurring ===
- Mason Temple as Hunter Chen, a band member who becomes one of Ginny's love interests
- Jonathan Potts as Mr. Gitten, Ginny and Max's English teacher, who has a strained relationship with Ginny due to his racial biases
- Sabrina Grdevich as Cynthia Fuller, Zach's mother, a real estate agent who runs for mayor against Paul and whose husband has cancer
- Alisen Down as Bev, Norah's adoptive mother, who can be uptight and is best friends with Cynthia
- Colton Gobbo as Jordan, Norah's long-term boyfriend and a friend of MANG
- Connor Laidman as Zach, Austin's school bully and later friend, and Cynthia's son
- Devyn Nekoda as Riley (season 1), Max's early love interest
- Karen LeBlanc as Lynette Miller, Zion's mother and Ginny's paternal grandmother
- Rebecca Ablack as Padma, Marcus's girlfriend in season 1, she is part of Hunter's band and works with Ginny at Blue Farm Café
- Tyssen Smith as Brodie, a friend of MANG and part of Hunter's band
- Dan Beirne as Nick, Paul's campaign manager at the office, and a friend of Georgia who dates Jesse
- Humberly González as Sophie Sanchez, a senior at school and Max's love interest
- Alex Mallari Jr. as PI Gabriel Cordova, a private investigator hired to surveil Georgia who becomes Nick's boyfriend while undercover as "Jesse"
- Damian Romeo as Matt Press, a friend of MANG who has an on-off thing with Abby
- Chris Kenopic as Clint Baker, Ellen's husband and Marcus and Max's father, he is deaf and communicates through ASL
- Romi Shraiter as Samantha, a fellow student kept at a distance by MANG, who can be racist and cruel to cover up her insecurities and mental health struggles
- Tameka Griffiths as Bracia, a Black student who bonds with Ginny over racial identity in a predominantly white town and does musical theatre with Maxine
- Zarrin Darnell-Martin as Dr. Lily (season 2–present), Ginny's psychotherapist
- Agape Mngomezulu as Bryon Bennett (season 2–present), Bracia's love interest
- Katelyn Wells as Silver (season 2–present), a friend of Marcus, costume designer for the school drama club, and Max's love interest
- Aaron Ashmore as Gil Timmins (season 2–present), Georgia's abusive ex-boyfriend and Austin's biological father, who was previously in prison for embezzlement and fraud
- Vinessa Antoine as Simone (season 2–present), Zion's girlfriend, who is a criminal defense lawyer
- Ty Doran as Wolfe (season 3), a student in Ginny's poetry class and love interest
- Tony Nappo as Josh Finn (season 3), the lawyer Paul hires to represent Georgia
- Mark Rendall as Mr. Kay (season 3), Ginny and Wolfe's poetry teacher
- Matthew MacFadzean as Mr. Foley (season 3), the prosecutor of Georgia's murder trial
- Noah Lamanna as Tris (season 3), a non-binary student who is a peer tutor and is friends with Marcus and Silver and Abby's love interest
- Ali Skovbyas as Rainn (season 4)
- Kataem O'Connor as Isaiah (season 4)
- Sunny Mabrey as Daisy (season 4)

== Episodes ==
=== Series overview ===
Season	Episodes	Originally released
1	10	February 24, 2021
2	10	January 5, 2023
3	10	June 5, 2025

=== Season 1 (2021) ===
No. overall	No. in season	Title	Directed by	Written by	Original release date
1	1	"Pilot"	Anya Adams	Sarah Lampert	February 24, 2021
Free-spirited Georgia Miller moves to Wellsbury, Massachusetts, with her teenage daughter Ginny and 9-year-old son Austin after her husband Kenny dies in a car accident after having a heart attack. On her first day at her new school, Ginny faces off with her English teacher and is befriended by Maxine "Max" Baker and Hunter Chen. Ginny kisses Max's twin brother Marcus even though he is in a relationship with Padma, and also agrees to go on a date with Hunter. Meanwhile, Georgia meets Mayor Paul Randolph at Blue Farm, a café run by Joe. Her credit card declines multiple times in one day, and so she calls her lawyer Marty to enquire about this. He reveals that Kenny's ex-wife is contesting his will and that Georgia has not yet received her inheritance. After Ginny arrives home from her date with Hunter, she has sex with Marcus. Georgia attends a board meeting held by Paul in which Cynthia Fuller is concerned about the healthiness of the lunch options in Wellsbury’s schools. Georgia blackmails Joe into supplying organic food to the schools at a low price, which lands her a job at Paul’s office. Flashbacks reveal how Georgia was abused as a teenager by her stepfather, and ran away from home. She meets a biker gang and begins a relationship with Zion, Ginny’s father. It is also revealed that Kenny’s heart attack and subsequent car crash were caused by her poisoning his smoothie with wolfsbane.
2	2	"It's a Face Not a Mask"	Anya Adams	Sarah Lampert & Debra J. Fisher	February 24, 2021
Ginny struggles to fit in with Max's friends, Abby and Norah, who are hostile towards her. Georgia starts her new job and slowly bonds with Paul’s assistant, Nick. Austin gets bullied by Cynthia’s son Zach at school, but is later named Star of the Week and tasked with bringing in something that represents him as a person. At work, Paul's team has difficulties with the approval for the new town marijuana dispensary, as the proposed site is in a historic building with no air conditioning. Ginny takes a contraceptive pill the day after having sex with Marcus. Later, she spends time with Max's friends in the hopes of meeting Hunter. They all smoke marijuana through a bong, and pressure Ginny to join in. She relents and does so in the hope of fitting in, but still feels like an outsider. Back at home, she practices self-harm by burning herself with a lighter. The following day, Max auditions for the school musical and Ginny goes shopping with Abby and Norah, whom she witnesses shoplifting. To fit in, Ginny steals a pair of earrings, but the girls are caught by the shop owner. Georgia arrives, and accuses the shop owner of racially profiling Ginny. She resolves the situation, advising Ginny not to trust Abby and Norah after they claim that Ginny was the only one who attempted to shoplift. While in town, Georgia meets Cynthia at her office, who inadvertently reveals that the historic building actually does have air conditioning. Cynthia hid this information as she was against the dispensary. Following Ginny’s shoplifting attempt, Georgia blackmails Joe again, this time to hire Ginny at Blue Farm. Meanwhile, Austin brings his incarcerated father Gil's letters into school for his Star of the Week project, claiming that his father is a wizard in Azkaban. Ginny has a breakdown with Marcus over feeling like an outcast, and reveals that she lost her virginity to him. Abby and Norah apologize to Ginny, and they reconcile, joining Max to form the group “MANG” (after the initial of each girl’s first name). The dispensary opens, much to the dismay of Cynthia. It is revealed that Georgia writes the letters to Austin, pretending to be Gil. She uses Austin’s social security number to take out multiple credit cards in his name. Kenny's ex-wife hires the private investigator Gabriel Cordova to investigate Georgia. Flashbacks reveal how teenage Georgia was taught to shoot a gun by a woman in the biker gang. She robs a gas station, before returning home to threaten her stepfather, eventually shooting him in the hand.
3	3	"Next Level Rich People Sh*t"	Renuka Jeyapalan	David Monahan & Danielle Hoover	February 24, 2021
Georgia accepts to have Ginny participate in the Sophomore sleepover and offers to chaperone the event along with Ellen, Max and Marcus’ mother, when she sees the money for the tickets. However, she is unable to find a babysitter for Austin. Paul later agrees to babysit him. Ginny starts her new job at Blue Farm. Max lands the lead role in the musical and develops romantic feelings for Riley, a fellow theater kid. Excited about the Sleepover, MANG discuss it via text conversation. It is revealed that Abby has body image issues and constricts her legs with duct tape to make them appear thinner. At the Sleepover, MANG take pictures in a photo booth; Hunter joins Ginny and kisses her. MANG decide to get matching ponytails, but the hairdresser accidentally ruins Ginny's hair. She runs to the changing room, where she finds Marcus hiding. As Ginny fixes her hair, they talk, with Marcus revealing that he struggled with depression following his best friend’s death from cancer the previous year. Georgia offers to take the money from the tickets to the principal’s office, while pocketing some of it for herself. Max confesses her feelings to Riley and kisses her, but Riley rejects her. A distraught Max confides in Georgia, who comforts her. Georgia finds Ginny in the changing room and the two quarrel, with Ginny accusing Georgia of being jealous of her. Meanwhile, Paul bonds with Austin over football. After he falls asleep, Paul finds the credit cards in Austin's name. After the Sleepover, Hunter asks Ginny to be his girlfriend and she accepts, while Max meets Sophie. Flashbacks reveal teenage Georgia finding out that she is pregnant in a gas station bathroom. Afterwards, she meets a boy named Joe on a school trip. Joe gives her half of his sandwich and tells her that he is from Wellsbury, and that he would love to have a farm with animals someday. Georgia recounts how she wished for a magic horse named Milkshake when she was a child. Before leaving, Joe gifts his Ray-Ban sunglasses to Georgia.
4	4	"Lydia Bennett is Hundo a Feminist"	Renuka Jeyapalan	Tawnya Bhattacharya & Ali Laventhol	February 24, 2021
In her first relationship, Ginny desperately wants Hunter to like her as he prepares for Battle of the Bands. At a board meeting, Georgia proposes to host a casino night instead of the usual bake sale to raise more money for the schools. At work, she is questioned by Human Resources about the credit cards in Austin's name. Georgia lies and says that it was Austin's father, Gil, who took out the cards, revealing that he is incarcerated for embezzlement from his employer. Feeling guilty, Paul agrees to casino night. At Max’s house with MANG, Ginny discusses feeling as though Hunter doesn't really like her, and how pornography gives a distorted image of sex to men, who never prioritize female pleasure, while Marcus overhears the conversation. Back at home, Ginny sexts Hunter, but when he fails to reply, she additionally sends the photo to Marcus. They begin a text conversation in which Ginny admits that she did not have an orgasm when they had sex. Marcus encourages her to masturbate, and she does so with an electric toothbrush. Georgia and Nick initially struggle to find funds to host casino night, but they manage to come through thanks to Georgia's resourcefulness. The night is a success, with Georgia raising four times the amount of money as the previous year, though she once again pockets some for herself. In English class, Ginny chooses to discuss Lydia Bennett from Pride and Prejudice, but feels personally attacked when Hunter does not agree with her, and shames the character. At Battle of the Bands, Hunter dedicates a song to Ginny and the two reconcile. Paul asks Georgia on a date. Flashbacks reveal teenage Georgia meeting Zion's parents after finding out that she is pregnant.
5	5	"Boo, Bitch"	Sudz Sutherland	Mike Gauyo & Briana Belser	February 24, 2021
Ginny becomes popular and well-adjusted in school after a video of Hunter's song posted to YouTube goes viral. MANG decide to throw a Halloween party, and discuss wearing a group costume. Ginny helps Max work up the courage to invite Sophie to the party. She also invites Bracia, one of few other people of color in the school, but ignores Marcus. While at work, Ginny overhears Padma complaining about Marcus’ lack of commitment in their relation. Ginny proposes that MANG attend the party dressed as different music video looks of Britney Spears. Georgia and Paul go on a date at Blue Farm and have an enjoyable evening, but Cynthia sees them. Ginny has dinner with Hunter's family. At the Halloween Fair, Paul talks about his innovative plans for Wellsbury if he is re-elected. Cynthia co-opts his speech and shames him for his date with Georgia, while announcing her candidacy for mayor. At their party, MANG’s group costume is generally received well, but Abby makes herself vomit after receiving a hurtful comment about her weight. Ginny reads negative comments about her under the video of Hunter’s song, and burns herself with candles in the bathroom. A drunk Max tries to get Sophie to kiss her publicly, but she is embarrassed by this, and leaves. Bracia arrives at the party and comments on Ginny's costume, implying that Ginny can dress up because she is white-passing. Ginny takes Max home and apologizes to Marcus for ignoring him, and the two agree to be friends. Georgia and Paul have sex in his office. She then comes home to find her sister Maddie, whom she hasn't seen in more than 10 years, sitting on her couch. Ginny is upset with Georgia for keeping such a large secret from her. Gabriel Cordova arrives in Wellsbury. Austin is teased by Zach and stabs him through the hand with a pencil in retaliation. Flashbacks reveal how Zion's parents offered to take custody of Ginny, but Georgia left in the middle of the night so as not to have her daughter taken away from her.
6	6	"I'm Triggered"	Sudz Sutherland	Danielle Hoover & David Monahan	February 24, 2021
After Austin's attack on Zach, he is suspended from school and is required to attend therapy, but Georgia disagrees and has an argument with Ginny. Maddie's presence forces Georgia to confront her traumatic past, while Austin bonds with his cousin Caleb. Ginny talks to Hunter about her disapproval for her mother's secrets, particularly surrounding her aunt Maddie. Nick tells Georgia about Jesse, a man he met at casino night, and later introduces them. Max pines for Sophie. A stressed Georgia goes to Blue Farm and talks to Joe, before being joined by Maddie. The two drink together and revive their bond. Meanwhile, Ginny talks to both Max and Marcus about the arrival of Maddie and Caleb, and receives more sympathy from Marcus than from Max. Joe and Georgia take a drunk Maddie home. Paul arrives and confesses his feelings for Georgia. Georgia snoops through Maddie's phone as she is asleep, and discovers that she is in Wellsbury to spy on her for the private investigator Gabriel Cordova who is paying her. Georgia finds a picture of Gabriel in Maddie’s phone, who is revealed to be Jesse. Georgia then kicks Maddie out of the house, offering her double the money she was to be paid to leave. Maddie reveals that after Georgia ran away from home as a teenager, their abusive stepfather began to target her. Max apologizes to Sophie for embarrassing her at the party, and the two kiss. Ginny comes home early from school and snoops through Georgia’s belongings. She finds photos of Georgia as a child and a gun. Georgia also comes home early, and hears noises coming from her bedroom. Suspecting a burglar, she heads upstairs with a gun from her purse. Ginny and Georgia have a very brief standoff with the two guns before recognising each other. Georgia tells Ginny that she keeps secrets to protect her, but Ginny rejects this. Georgia burns the photos of her as a child while Ginny calls Zion. Flashbacks show teenage Georgia working illegally at a bar owned by an older man named Anthony Green, who is romantically interested in her. She starts a gambling ring to earn additional money. A short time after, teenage Maddie arrives after having also run away from home. Georgia demands that she leave after Maddie leaves Ginny in the bathtub unattended. Maddie steals all of Georgia's money and leaves.
7	7	"Happy Sweet Sixteen, Jerk"	Aleysa Young	Ali Laventhol & Tawnya Bhattacharya	February 24, 2021
Ginny turns 16. Paul publicly debates Cynthia and later spends time with Austin, advising him about his conflict with Zach. Georgia embezzles money from work. Her family quarrels over dinner, and Paul subsequently stays the night. Georgia arranges a surprise party and sleepover for Ginny and invites MANG. Nick and Gabriel arrive unannounced, and Georgia calls Gabriel by his real name. Gabriel receives a phone call regarding medical tests that showed Kenny to be in excellent health shortly before his death. MANG raid Georgia's liquor cabinet and sneak over to Max's house. They are joined by their partners for a party while Max and Marcus’ parents are away. Georgia discovers MANG gone and reports the party, which is raided by the police. Paul goes to bail Ginny out from jail. After she returns home, Georgia tells Ginny about how her stepfather abused her, causing her to run away from home. She later admits that she has not received Kenny’s inheritance and is broke. Austin returns to school but loses his nerve and runs off. Flashbacks show when teenage Georgia was arrested due to running the illegal gambling ring, nearly losing custody of Ginny.
8	8	"Check One, Check Other"	Aleysa Young	Briana Belser & Mike Gauyo	February 24, 2021
Cynthia releases a defamatory video against Paul and Georgia, causing Paul to lose support in his campaign. Padma breaks up with Marcus. In English class, Ginny is required to write an essay to submit to a competition. Zion arrives in Wellsbury. Ginny fears her parents getting back together despite Georgia's commitment to Paul. Paul comes to dinner and meets Zion. Abby’s parents separate, but MANG fails to recognise her struggles. Marcus seeks advice from Max and Sophie, determined to tell Ginny about his feelings for her. Zion takes Ginny to a slam poetry night in Boston, where he promises that he is going to settle down to be close to her. Marcus attempts to climb Ginny’s window but is caught by Georgia. Georgia confronts Ginny, sparking a large fight. Austin continues to pretend to go to school so as not to face Zach. Ginny presents her essay for the competition in English class, it being a poem. Her teacher declares Hunter to be the winner and calls Ginny's work too unconventional. Max and Sophie have sex. Ginny and Hunter fight about Ginny's poem and their different experiences and treatments as ethnic minorities. Ginny has a heart-to-heart with Zion, who encourages her to be her truest self. Abby asks MANG to meet at Blue Farm and accuses them of having abandoned her in her time of need. The girls make peace and promise to be there for each other. Gabriel discovers Georgia grows wolfsbane and that it can cause heart attacks. Cynthia releases an interview accusing Georgia of having guns in her house, which angers Paul as his political stance is against gun ownership. Georgia has sex with Zion. Ginny sees her parents in bed together and has a meltdown. She attempts to burn herself, but Marcus sees her through the window. He attempts to declare his love for her, but Ginny personally insults him, leaving him deeply hurt. Marcus then drives his motorcycle into a ditch. Flashbacks show Georgia marrying Anthony Green out of desperation so as not to lose custody of Ginny. Trapped, she drugs him and watches as he dies, contemplating calling an ambulance before putting down the phone.
9	9	"Feelings Are Hard"	Catalina Aguilar-Mastretta	Danielle Hoover & David Monahan	February 24, 2021
Ginny feels deep guilt surrounding Marcus' crash. He comes home from the hospital with a concussion. Georgia keeps Zion at a distance and apologizes to Paul. Gabriel presents his hypothesis that Georgia poisoned Kenny with wolfsbane and is granted permission by a judge to exhume his body. While playing hide-and-seek with Zion, Austin finds the letters he wrote to Gil in Georgia's closet. Ginny confides in Joe about Marcus and seeks his advice. Georgia and Ginny discuss Zion, with Georgia promising that nothing will happen between her and him. The Millers have dinner with the Bakers. Ginny visits convalescent Marcus in his room but encounters Padma instead, who tells her that Marcus likes her. Zion confesses to Georgia that he wants to settle down with her. Georgia helps Paul win support back for his campaign by organizing a town rally aimed at bettering Wellsbury, while she continues to embezzle money from work. Cynthia sees Georgia at the bank cashing the embezzled money. Sophie breaks up with Max, leaving her devastated. Zion tells Ginny he has rented an apartment in Boston to stay close to her. MANG comforts Max, but Ginny visits Marcus again, worried that he is angry with her because he hasn’t been replying to her texts. He responds that he lost his phone in the accident, and Ginny asks him to forgive her. He does so, and the two embrace, but are discovered by Abby. She begs Ginny to stop and not tell Max, as she believes it would tear the friend group apart. After the rally, Georgia attempts to break up with Paul, but he instead asks her to marry him, saying he sees her for who she truly is. Georgia accepts his proposal. When she arrives home, Georgia finds Zion leaving, saying that he does not want to hold her back. Ginny tells Marcus she loves him, he reciprocates, and they have sex. After, Marcus tells Ginny that he can help her with her self-harm, if she wants. Cynthia sneaks into Paul's office and finds proof that Georgia is embezzling money. Gabriel finds Kenny's body missing from his grave. Austin shows Ginny the letters Georgia never sent to Gil, so Ginny helps him mail them. Max finds Marcus' lost phone and reads Ginny's messages, discovering that Ginny is romantically involved with him. Flashbacks show Georgia and Ginny arriving at Zion's apartment after not having any contact for a year. They live together for a time, but Georgia recognises that she is holding Zion back from achieving his dreams, so she encourages him to achieve them.
10	10	"The Worst Betrayal Since Jordyn and Kylie"	Catalina Aguilar-Mastretta	Debra J. Fisher & Sarah Lampert	February 24, 2021
Austin continues skipping school, while Ginny finds herself cut off from MANG. Cynthia publicly accuses Georgia of embezzlement, but Human Resources concludes that there is no money missing. Nick notices a large deposit made that morning for the same amount of money Cynthia accused Georgia of embezzling. Georgia encourages Paul to buy fireworks for his re-election speech. After being singled out by her English teacher, Ginny encounters Bracia in the bathroom and discusses being a person of color in a predominantly white town. Hunter tells Ginny that he doesn't want to break up, before adding that he loves her. Joe notices Ginny wearing Ray-Ban sunglasses, and she informs him that Georgia received them from a stranger at a gas station. Realising that the stranger was him, Joe prepares to confess his feelings to Georgia, but she comes into the café and informs him of her engagement to Paul. Ginny attempts to talk with Max, but Max reveals that she knows about her and Marcus. Ginny accuses Abby of telling Max, who also becomes angered with Abby. Hunter intervenes, and Abby tells him how Ginny cheated on him with Marcus. Marcus then arrives and claims it was a mistake, before Hunter punches him. Ginny is heartbroken by Marcus' words and leaves him. Max tells Ellen about Ginny and Marcus, and Ellen confronts Georgia about not telling her. Georgia talks to Ginny, who erupts at her, accusing her of lying, driving Zion away, and faking Austin's letters, which Ginny reveals she mailed, to Georgia's dismay. Ginny blackmails her English teacher into signing a recommendation letter for her by accusing him of being a racist, while Georgia finds out Austin has been skipping school. Cut off from her friends, Ginny spends time with Bracia. At work, she receives a visit from Gabriel, who reveals that he is investigating Georgia. He asks Ginny to come forward with any information she may have, fearing Georgia may be dangerous, but Ginny claims she doesn’t believe him and has nothing to say. Ginny comes home to Georgia leaving for the announcement of the winner of the mayoral election and decides to run away. She and Austin burn Georgia’s wolfsbane, steal Marcus' bike, and ride off, just as Paul wins the election. Cynthia comes home disappointed to her husband, who is in a coma. Georgia reveals to Gabriel that she put Kenny's ashes in the fireworks.

=== Season 2 (2023) ===
No. overall	No. in season	Title	Directed by	Written by	Original release date
11	1	"Welcome Back, Bitches!"	James Genn	Sarah Lampert & Debra J. Fisher	January 5, 2023
12	2	"Why Does Everything Have to Be So Terrible, All the Time, Forever?"	James Genn	Danielle Hoover & David Monahan	January 5, 2023
13	3	"What Are You Playing at, Little Girl?"	Audrey Cummings	Mike Gauyo	January 5, 2023
14	4	"Happy My Birthday to You"	Audrey Cummings	Anil K. Foreman	January 5, 2023
15	5	"Latkes Are Lit"	Danishka Esterhazy	Kale Futterman	January 5, 2023
16	6	"A Very Merry Ginny & Georgia Christmas Special"	Danishka Esterhazy	Angela Nissel	January 5, 2023
17	7	"Let Us Serenade the Sh*t Out of You"	Sharon Lewis	Danielle Hoover & David Monahan	January 5, 2023
18	8	"Hark! Darkness Descends!"	Sharon Lewis	Megan Hartenstein & Jordan Dumbroff	January 5, 2023
19	9	"Kill Gil"	Rose Troche	Debra J. Fisher & Sarah Lampert	January 5, 2023
20	10	"I'm No Cinderella"	Rose Troche	Sarah Lampert & Debra J. Fisher	January 5, 2023

=== Season 3 (2025) ===
No. overall	No. in season	Title	Directed by	Written by	Original release date
21	1	"This Wouldn't Even Be a Podcast"	April Mullen	Sarah Lampert	June 5, 2025
22	2	"Beep Beep Freaking Beep"	April Mullen	Danielle Hoover & David Monahan	June 5, 2025
23	3	"Friends Can Dance"	Jasmin Mozaffari	Ayotunde Ifaturoti & Michelle Askew	June 5, 2025
24	4	"The Bitch Is Back"	Jasmin Mozaffari	Ali Kinney	June 5, 2025
25	5	"Boom Goes the Dynamite"	Liz Allen	Eboni Freeman	June 5, 2025
26	6	"At Least It Can't Get Worse"	Liz Allen	Zachary Arthur & Jordan Dumbroff	June 5, 2025
27	7	"That's Wild"	Sharon Lewis	Kourtney Richard	June 5, 2025
28	8	"Is That a Packed Lunch?"	Sharon Lewis	Danielle Hoover & David Monahan	June 5, 2025
29	9	"It's Time for My Solo"	Darnell Martin	Sarah Glinski	June 5, 2025
30	10	"Monsters"	Darnell Martin	Sarah Lampert	June 5, 2025

== Production ==
=== Development ===
On August 13, 2019, it was announced that Netflix had given the production a series order for a first season consisting of ten episodes. The series comes from creator Sarah Lampert and showrunner Debra J. Fisher. Other executive producers include Anya Adams, Jeff Tahler, Jenny Daly, Holly Hines, and Dan March. Adams also directed the first two episodes of the series. Lampert penned the script while working at Madica Productions as the manager of development. The script was then sent to Critical Content and shared with Dynamic Television before touching down at Netflix. On April 19, 2021, Netflix renewed the series for a second season. On May 17, 2023, Netflix renewed the series for its third and fourth seasons with Sarah Glinski joining as the new showrunner, replacing Fisher.

=== Casting ===
Alongside the initial series announcement, it was reported that Brianne Howey, Antonia Gentry, Diesel La Torraca, Jennifer Robertson, Felix Mallard, Sara Waisglass, Scott Porter, and Raymond Ablack were cast as series regulars. On January 20, 2021, it was announced that Mason Temple was cast in a recurring role. In order to prepare for their roles, Robertson, Mallard and Waisglass learned American Sign Language. On January 28, 2022, it was reported that Aaron Ashmore was joining the cast in a recurring role for the second season. On September 13, 2024, Ty Doran and Noah Lamanna were cast in recurring capacities for the third season. On November 5, 2025, Ali Skovbye, Kataem O'Connor, and Sunny Mabrey joined the cast in recurring roles for the fourth season.

=== Filming ===
Principal photography for the series began on August 14, 2019, and ended on December 13, 2019. Filming took place in Toronto and Cobourg, Ontario, Canada. Filming for the second season began on November 29, 2021, and concluded on April 27, 2022. Filming for the third season began on April 29, 2024. On September 13, 2024, it was reported that filming for the third season had concluded. Filming for the fourth season began on October 7, 2025 and concluded on March 6, 2026.

== Release ==
Ginny & Georgia premiered on February 24, 2021. The second season was released on January 5, 2023. The third season premiered on June 5, 2025. The fourth season is scheduled to be released on January 21, 2027.

== Reception ==
=== Audience viewership ===
On April 19, 2021, Netflix announced that 52 million subscribers watched the first season of the series for the first 28 days after its release. In its first 28-days on Netflix, Ginny & Georgia was watched for 381 million hours globally.

On January 10, 2023, it was reported that the second season was at the top of Netflix Top 10 TV Chart for the week of January 2 to 8, 2023, with 180.47M hours viewed. For the week of January 9 to 15, the second season was at the top of Netflix Top 10 TV Chart again with 162.7M hours viewed for the week. Season 2 now resides in the all-time top 10 English language shows with 504.77 million hours watched globally in the first 28 days.

Following the release of season 2, the show featured in the Nielsen top 10s for eight weeks.

The third season drew 17.6 million viewers which landed at No.1 on Netflix Top 10, following the release.

=== Critical response ===
Critical response of Ginny & Georgia
Season	Rotten Tomatoes	Metacritic
1	68% (31 reviews)	62 (15 reviews)
2	60% (10 reviews)	71 (5 reviews)
3	75% (16 reviews)	59 (7 reviews)

For the first season, review aggregator Rotten Tomatoes reported an approval rating of 68% based on 31 critic reviews, with an average rating of 6.2/10. The website's critics consensus reads, "If Ginny & Georgia can't quite pull off its tonally ambitious first season, it's at least entertaining to watch it try." Metacritic gave the first season a weighted average score of 62 out of 100 based on 15 critic reviews, indicating "generally favorable".

Kristen Baldwin of Entertainment Weekly gave the first season a B− and wrote a review saying, "Ginny & Georgia wants us to love the way that Georgia always manages to stay one step ahead... Instead, I kept hoping that Child Protective Services would finally catch up." Melanie McFarland of Salon said, "playing with class conflict in a show like this is easy. Leaning into other essential American ugliness while permeating the plot's intrigue with black humor and snark is a more challenging knit. This show blends all of these emotional colors nicely while also ensuring that neither Ginny nor Georgia or anyone else comes off as one-dimensional." Allison Shoemaker at RogerEbert.com complimented the show's depiction of a 15-year-old. "The writers and Gentry together do an especially nice job of capturing the endless conflicting impulses that make being 15 such a nightmare and thrill; Ginny often struggles to understand herself, but it's clear that Gentry knows her intimately." Lucy Mangan of The Guardian labeled it, "Desperate Housewives meets Gilmore Girls meets Buffy". Proma Khosla of Mashable calls out "the magnetism of Georgia and anyone she meets, Max's tenderness, [and] the rollercoaster of adolescent female friendship" as key components of the show. Reviewing the series' first season for Rolling Stone, Alan Sepinwall gave a rating of 3/5. When comparing the series to Gilmore Girls, he said: "There's also one area where Ginny & Georgia has a clear leg up on its predecessor: It understands from the jump that it's not especially healthy to have a mom who wants to be your best friend and is reluctant to fully grow up herself."

The second season has a 60% approval rating on Rotten Tomatoes, based on 10 reviews, with an average rating of 6.5/10. The website's critics consensus states, "Ginny & Georgia continues to strain credulity in its search for topical drama, but fans of the first season ought to still enjoy this sudsy sophomore outing." On Metacritic, the second season has a weighted average score of 71 out of 100 based on 5 reviews, indicating "generally favorable".

The third season holds an approval rating of 75% on Rotten Tomatoes, based on 16 critic reviews. The website's critics consensus reads, "Focused by a clearer throughline that doesn't skimp on melodrama, Ginny & Georgia's third season is still uneven but pulls off its most successful mix of froth and seriousness yet." On Metacritic, the second season has a weighted average score of 55 out of 100 based on 6 reviews, indicating "mixed or average".

=== Race and gender ===
On February 25, 2021, the term "Oppression Olympics" went viral on Twitter in response to a scene where the characters Hunter and Ginny use the term in an argument. The scene was received negatively by viewers, who criticized its commentary on race and stereotypes, with many calling the exchange "embarrassing".

On March 1, 2021, a line in the first-season finale drew attention, spoken by Ginny to Georgia: "You go through men faster than Taylor Swift." This drew backlash from fans, who condemned the line as being misogynistic and an example of slut-shaming the musician; the phrase "Respect Taylor Swift" trended worldwide on Twitter. Swift herself responded very negatively, tweeting, "Hey Ginny & Georgia, 2010 called and it wants its lazy, deeply sexist joke back. How about we stop degrading hard working women by defining this horse shit as FuNnY [sic]." She went on to criticize Netflix—which distributed her documentary Miss Americana—writing, "Also, @netflix after Miss Americana, this outfit doesn't look cute on you". The show was subsequently review bombed on multiple platforms, including Rotten Tomatoes, IMDb, and Metacritic; as well as Google reviews. The series was also criticized for its unflattering lines referring to Lady Gaga and Lana Del Rey.

== Other media ==
On February 26, 2021, Netflix released Ginny & Georgia: The Afterparty.
