= Happy Together (American TV series) =

American comedy television series

- Genre: Sitcom
- Created by: Tim McAuliffe; Austen Earl
- Starring: Damon Wayans Jr.; Amber Stevens West; Stephnie Weir; Victor Williams; Chris Parnell; Felix Mallard
- Opening theme: "Happy Together"
- Composer: Frank Ciampi
- Country of origin: United States
- Original language: English
- No. of seasons: 1
- No. of episodes: 13

Production
- Executive producers: Ben Winston; Tim McAuliffe; Austen Earl; Michael Rotenberg; Jonathan Berry; Harry Styles
- Producers: Michael Hobert; Gracie Glassmeyer; Grant Johnson; Annette Sahakian Davis (pilot)
- Cinematography: Wayne Kennan
- Editor: Richard Candib
- Camera setup: Multi-camera
- Running time: 22 minutes
- Production companies: Fulwell 73; 3 Arts Entertainment; The Gary Breakfast Corporation; Page Entertainment; CBS Television Studios

Original release
- Network: CBS
- Release: October 1, 2018 – January 14, 2019

Happy Together is an American television sitcom created by Tim McAuliffe and Austen Earl, that aired on CBS from October 1, 2018 to January 14, 2019. The series follows a young couple whose lives are suddenly thrown into chaos when a pop star moves into their home. It stars Damon Wayans Jr., Amber Stevens West, Felix Mallard, Stephnie Weir, Victor Williams and Chris Parnell.

In May 2019, the series was cancelled after one season.

== Premise ==
Happy Together follows "Jake and Claire, a thirty something couple who are tired of their mundane life and start to reconnect with their younger, cooler selves when an emerging pop star, who is drawn to their super-normal suburban life, moves in."

== Cast and characters ==
=== Main ===
- Damon Wayans Jr. as Jake, an accountant in the entertainment industry who has Cooper James as a client
- Amber Stevens West as Claire, a restaurant and bar designer and Jake's wife
- Stephnie Weir as Bonnie, a retired doctor and Claire's mother
- Victor Williams as Gerald, a retired doctor and Claire's father
- Chris Parnell as Wayne, a talent manager and Jake's colleague who also works for Cooper
- Felix Mallard as Cooper James, an up-and-coming pop star and client of Jake's

=== Recurring ===
- Winston James Francis as Nightmare, Cooper's bodyguard

=== Guest ===
- Peyton List as Sierra Quinn ("Pilot"), an actress and ex-girlfriend of Cooper's
- Mary Holland as Suzanne ("Pilot"), an assistant of Sierra's whom she refers to as "Alexa"
- James Corden as himself ("Pilot"), the host of The Late Late Show with James Corden who mentions Cooper and Sierra's break-up in his opening monologue
- Pia Mia as Rylie Conners ("Pilot"), a woman Cooper dates while broken up with Sierra
- Betsy Sodaro as Donna ("Scrubbing"), a thrift store employee that helps Cooper retrieve all of Jake and Claire's donated items
- Anders Holm as Antoine ("Let's Work It Out"), Cooper's workout coach
- Damon Wayans as Mike Davis ("Like Father, Like Son"), an accountant for the Boston Celtics and Jake's father
- Steve-O as S10CIL ("Bland Gestures"), a tattoo artist
- Ben Simmons as himself ("Bland Gestures"), an NBA star who plays a charity game with Jake
- Sam Lloyd as Gene Johnston ("Til Death Do We Party"), a podiatrist and Jake and Claire's neighbor

== Episodes ==
No.	Title	Directed by	Written by	Original release date	U.S. viewers (millions)
1	"Pilot"	Phill Lewis	Tim McAuliffe & Austen Earl	October 1, 2018	5.95
Cooper James, a rising young pop star from Australia, asks to temporarily stay with his tax accountant Jake Davis and his wife Claire as a way to escape the paparazzi. Cooper finds their mundane suburban life to be a welcome vacation from the trappings of stardom, but Jake and Claire do not like being labeled "old and boring". They accompany Cooper to an exclusive nightclub and Claire is photographed dancing with him, creating a media buzz and causing Cooper's ex-girlfriend Sierra to return. Realizing Sierra is too high-maintenance, Cooper decides to leave her again and make his living situation with the Davises longer-term.
2	"Scrubbing"	Andy Ackerman	Rebecca Kohler & Darrin Rose	October 8, 2018	4.89
Cooper encourages Jake and Claire to "scrub" anything from their past, but Jake and Claire find it difficult to part with their old possessions. When they finally do, it backfires, as they find themselves losing their individual identities and becoming Claire's think-alike parents.
3	"Let's Work It Out"	Andy Ackerman	Brad Stevens & Boyd Vico	October 15, 2018	4.68
When Jake can no longer dunk a basketball and Claire cannot fit into her old jeans, the two decide to ditch junk food and adopt Cooper's healthy eating regimen. Their commitment does not last long, and worse, their junk food passion seems to have rubbed off on Cooper.
4	"About Your Parents"	Phill Lewis	Naomi Iwamoto	October 22, 2018	4.68
When Claire contracts the flu, Jake tries to prove to her parents that he can take care of her without their help. He even makes Claire's favorite lettuce wraps, but a flaw in his plan surfaces when everyone who eats the wraps gets food poisoning.
5	"Like Father, Like Son"	Phill Lewis	Craig Wayans	October 29, 2018	4.38
When Jake's father Mike arrives for a visit, it seems like their best friend relationship has picked up right where it left off. However, Jake becomes hurt when Mike opens up to Cooper about something personal instead of sharing it with him.
6	"Bland Gestures"	Mark Cendrowski	Luke Cunningham & Matt Unsworth	November 5, 2018	4.12
Cooper has begun dating a country music star and wants to do something special for her, so he asks Jake and Claire about any grand romantic gestures they have done for each other. Jake and Claire are stumped, so each decides it's time to do something bold and unexpected for the other.
7	"How Jake and Claire Met"	Jeff Greenstein	Gracie Glassmeyer	November 12, 2018	4.47
Cooper finds himself interested in an attractive young woman who does not know of his celebrity and this triggers a recollection by Jake and Claire of when they first met at Dartmouth. However, the couple's memories of that time end up differing greatly.
8	"Til Death Do We Party"	Jeff Greenstein	Stephnie Weir	November 19, 2018	4.68
Concerned about how much her parents are partying, Claire sets them up on a double date with their boring old doctor friends, Gene and Jean Johnston. But Bonnie and Gerald quickly ditch the Johnstons to go to a dance club that Cooper is attending. Meanwhile, Wayne worries that Cooper's new laid-back suburban lifestyle is affecting his ability to write exciting songs for his next album.
9	"The Power of Yes...Men"	Andy Ackerman	Amina Munir	December 3, 2018	4.53
Jake's fear of public speaking comes to a head as he prepares for a big presentation at work. After first mocking him, Claire realizes a little encouragement is all her husband needs. Meanwhile, Cooper realizes he is surrounded by "yes men" who always tell him he's great, which has him questioning every choice he's ever made.
10	"Home Insecurity"	Andy Ackerman	Jen D'Angelo	December 10, 2018	4.34
When one of Cooper's stalkers is able to enter the Davis home without detection, Claire determines that they need a home alarm and video monitoring system. Jake initially objects, but soon finds himself using the system to snoop on Claire and Cooper.
11	"A Claire-Free Lifestyle"	Phill Lewis	Hillary Handelsman & Anton Schettini	December 17, 2018	4.11
Frustrated by a lack of creative control at her design company, Claire quits, which has Jake worried about finances. Claire lands an interview with a designer she admires, but realizes she will likely be in a similar position if she takes the job. She instead decides to start her own business. Meanwhile, Cooper discovers he has no idea what things really cost, so he enlists Claire's parents to help him be more frugal in his spending.
12	"Vows"	Andy Ackerman	Michael Hobert	January 7, 2019	4.26
Cooper finds Jake's and Claire's wedding vows and decides to make a framed, blow-up copy for their anniversary. Unfortunately, the always-present vows on their mantle cause Jake and Claire to fight when each accuses the other of not living up to them.
13	"Backstage P(asses)"	Andy Ackerman	Brad Stevens & Boyd Vico	January 14, 2019	5.09
Cooper complains about singing the same songs night after night, telling Claire and Jake that he's afraid to try out a new song he's written. Claire and Jake suggest he play a smaller venue to debut the song. The night of the performance, Cooper's backup singer gets sick, forcing Claire to fill in. The duet becomes a surprise hit on the internet, but Claire has an even bigger surprise for everyone: she's pregnant.

== Production ==
=== Development ===
On January 31, 2018, it was announced that CBS had given the production a pilot order. The episode was written by Tim McAuliffe and Austen Earl who were expected to executive produce alongside Ben Winston, Michael Rotenberg, and Jonathan Berry. Production companies involved with the pilot include Fulwell 73, 3 Arts Entertainment, and CBS Television Studios. On May 9, 2018, CBS officially ordered the pilot to series. A few days later, it was announced that the series, now titled Happy Together, would premiere in the fall of 2018 and air on Mondays at 8:30 P.M. On July 9, 2018, it was announced that the series would premiere on October 1, 2018.

On November 28, 2018, it was announced that CBS had declined to order additional episodes of the series beyond the initial order of thirteen, and that its timeslot on their schedule would be filled by the third season of Man with a Plan. On May 10, 2019, CBS canceled the series after a single season.

=== Casting ===
In February 2018, it was announced that Damon Wayans Jr. and Felix Mallard had been cast in the pilot's lead roles. In March 2018, it was reported that Chris Parnell and Amber Stevens West had also joined the pilot's main cast. On June 22, 2018, it was announced that Victor Williams had been cast to replace Tim Meadows in the recurring role of Gerald, West's character's father. Meadows was forced to drop out of the role after the series Schooled, which he had in first position against Happy Together, was picked up to series by ABC.

=== Filming ===
Happy Together was filmed at Radford Studio Center in Studio City, California, but it is set in Los Angeles, California.

== Release ==
=== Marketing ===
On May 16, 2018, CBS released the first official trailer for the series.

=== Premiere ===
On September 12, 2018, the series took part in the 12th annual PaleyFest Fall Television Previews which featured a preview screening of the series and a conversation with cast members including Damon Wayans Jr., Amber Stevens West, and Felix Mallard.

== Reception ==
=== Critical response ===
The series has been met with a mixed response from critics upon its premiere. On the review aggregation website Rotten Tomatoes, the series holds an approval rating of 53% with an average rating of 5.17 out of 10, based on 19 reviews. The website's critical consensus reads, "Happy Together's premise won't win many points for originality, but the show still earns laughs thanks to a winning trio of central performances." Metacritic, which uses a weighted average, assigned the series a score of 48 out of 100 based on 9 critics, indicating "mixed or average reviews".

=== Ratings ===
Viewership and ratings per episode of Happy Together
No.	Title	Air date	Rating/share (18–49)	Viewers (millions)	DVR (18–49)	DVR viewers (millions)	Total (18–49)	Total viewers (millions)
1	"Pilot"	October 1, 2018	1.0/5	5.95	0.3	0.96	1.3	6.91
2	"Scrubbing"	October 8, 2018	0.9/4	4.89	0.2	0.65	1.1	5.54
3	"Let's Work It Out"	October 15, 2018	0.9/4	4.68	0.2	0.65	1.1	5.33
4	"About Your Parents"	October 22, 2018	0.9/4	4.68	0.1	0.66	1.0	5.35
5	"Like Father, Like Son"	October 29, 2018	0.9/4	4.38	0.1	0.61	1.0	4.99
6	"Bland Gestures"	November 5, 2018	0.8/3	4.12	0.2	0.64	1.0	4.76
7	"How Jake and Claire Met"	November 12, 2018	0.8/3	4.47	0.2	0.62	1.0	5.09
8	"Til Death Do We Party"	November 19, 2018	0.9/4	4.68	0.1	0.61	1.0	5.29
9	"The Power of Yes...Men"	December 3, 2018	0.8/3	4.53	0.2	0.55	1.0	5.09
10	"Home Insecurity"	December 10, 2018	0.8/3	4.34	0.2	0.60	1.0	4.95
11	"A Claire-Free Lifestyle"	December 17, 2018	0.7/3	4.11	0.2	0.63	0.9	4.74
12	"Vows"	January 7, 2019	0.8/3	4.26	0.2	0.54	1.0	4.80
13	"Backstage P(asses)"	January 14, 2019	0.9/4	5.09	0.2	0.57	1.1	5.66

== Home media ==
The complete series of Happy Together was released on DVD on March 2, 2021, via DeepDiscount.
