= The Well (2025 film) =

- American theatrical release poster
- Directed by: Hubert Davis
- Screenplay by: Michael Capellupo; Kathleen Hepburn
- Produced by: Coral Aiken; Hubert Davis; Rebecca Rogers
- Starring: Shailyn Pierre-Dixon; Joanne Boland; Arnold Pinnock; Sheila McCarthy; Idrissa Sanogo
- Cinematography: Stuart James Cameron
- Edited by: Hubert Davis
- Music by: Cris Derksen
- Production companies: Aiken Heart Films; Folk Tale; Conquering Lion Pictures
- Distributed by: Vortex Media; XYZ Films
- Release date: July 21, 2025 (Fantasia)
- Running time: 91 minutes
- Country: Canada
- Language: English

The Well is a 2025 Canadian thriller film, directed by Hubert Davis.

Set in an apocalyptic world in which the world's water supply has become infected with a deadly virus, the film stars Shailyn Pierre-Dixon as Sarah Devine, a young girl who lives with her parents Elisha (Joanne Boland) and Paul (Arnold Pinnock) in an isolated home with access to a safe supply of water. When Jamie (Idrissa Sanogo) turns up in one of their security traps claiming to be Elisha and Paul's nephew whom they had believed was dead, the family are initially drawn into conflict about whether or not to trust him, but after the filter that protects the family's water supply develops a crack, Sarah and Jamie set off to find a replacement part, ending up at a cult compound run by Gabriel (Sheila McCarthy).

The cast also includes Natasha Mumba, Noah Lamanna, Steven McCarthy, Jim Carey and Cameron Nicoll in supporting roles.

== Production ==
Davis's first narrative feature in a career making documentary films, the film was shot in fall 2023 in and around Hamilton, Ontario.

== Distribution ==
The film premiered on July 21, 2025, at the 29th Fantasia International Film Festival.

== Critical response ==
On the review aggregator website Rotten Tomatoes, 44% of 18 critics' reviews are positive.

Courtney Small of That Shelf wrote that "considering how many characters the script is juggling, the focus on each parent’s personal demons takes away precious time from Sarah’s plight in the compound and the sense of danger that swirls around it. The Well is most captivating when it is either physically placing the young woman in peril, like when she first must get the broken filter out of the well, or having her navigate the chess style psychological battle she develops with Gabriel."

Allan Hunter of Screen Daily wrote that "Davis and cinematographer Stuart James Cameron ground the film in a familiar but convincing depiction of a planet in distress. Images of gnarled trees, rusted factories and dry rivers point to a bleak future, while autumnal forest paths covered in leaves and plants seem to suggest nature is reclaiming a land that humanity has destroyed."

For Exclaim!, Nathan Chizen wrote that "while The Well recognizes the fallacies in following a charismatic leader, the simplicity of those ideas alongside such incredibly grounded production makes me wish that such a film had dared to go deeper."
