= Love Jacked =

2018 Canadian romantic comedy film

- Film poster
- Directed by: Alfons Adetuyi
- Written by: Robert Adetuyi; Linda Eskeland
- Starring: Amber Stevens West; Shamier Anderson; Keith David; Lyriq Bent
- Cinematography: Lance Gewer
- Edited by: Lisa di Michele
- Music by: Steve London
- Production company: Inner City Films
- Release date: February 8, 2018
- Running time: 100 minutes
- Country: Canada
- Language: English

Love Jacked is a Canadian romantic comedy film, directed by Alfons Adetuyi and released in 2018. The film was shot primarily in Hamilton, Ontario, with some location shooting in Cape Town, South Africa.

== Plot ==
The film stars Amber Stevens West as Maya, a young woman on a trip to South Africa. While there she enters a whirlwind romance with Mtumbie (Demetrius Grosse), but shortly before returning home she breaks off their engagement when she catches him with another woman.

To protect herself from the disapproval of her father (Keith David), she enlists Malcolm (Shamier Anderson), a Canadian pool hustler on the run from his vengeful partner in crime Tyrell (Lyriq Bent), to impersonate Mtumbie.

Over a number of days, Malcolm gets to know Maya's family and Maya herself. He shows his carpentry skills helping her dad build a small studio, and he and Maya connect while joking around with some paints on a canvas. She gets herself and family members outfitted for the wedding ceremony.

In the meantime, Tyrell sees Malcolm in town and demands he give his split of an earlier pool hustle, which he doesn't have because he returned it. Malcolm lets Tyrell think he's impersonating Mtumbie to scam the family out of money, when in reality he's planning to fake his death for Maya's sake.

At the wake, both the real Mtumbie and Malcolm show up. Maya and Malcolm declare their feelings for each other, and Maya's cousin Naomi (Nicole Lyn) flirts with Mtumbie.

== Cast ==
- Keith David as Ed, Maya's dad
- Amber Stevens West as Maya
- Shamier Anderson as Malcolm
- Lyriq Bent as Tyrell
- Mike Epps as Uncle Rufus
- Marla Gibbs as Rose
- Demetrius Grosse as Mtumbie
- Nicole Lyn as Naomi
- Kim Roberts as Aunt Hilary

== Awards and nominations ==
The film received a Canadian Screen Award nomination for Best Hair (Renée Chan) at the 7th Canadian Screen Awards.
