= Sara Waisglass =

Canadian actress (born 1998)

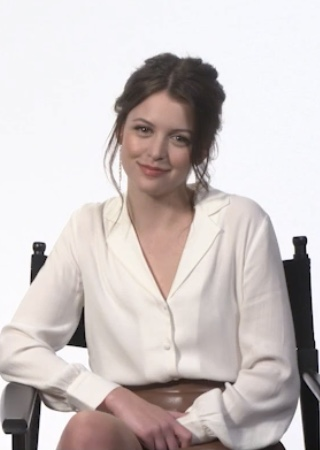
- An image of Sara Waisglass in 2022
- Born: July 3, 1998 (age 28); Toronto, Ontario, Canada
- Occupation: Actress
- Years active: 2007–present

Sara Waisglass (born July 3, 1998) is a Canadian actress.

Waisglass initially rose to notability as a child actress, playing the role of Jordy Cooper in the children's sitcom Overruled! from 2010 to 2011. As a teenager, she appeared as Frankie Hollingsworth in Degrassi: The Next Generation and Degrassi: Next Class from 2013 to 2017. She also played Robyn in the 2017 drama film Mary Goes Round. As an adult, she starred as Maxine Baker in the Netflix drama series Ginny & Georgia since 2021.

== Early life ==
Sara was born and raised in Toronto, Ontario to parents Tessa and Jeff Waisglass, along with her sister Carly. She attended Earl Haig Secondary School in Toronto. She attended York University for four years, graduating with a degree in screenwriting, citing an interest in developing her writing skills. She likes to play the piano. She is Jewish.

== Career ==
In 2007, Waisglass made her television debut playing eight-year-old Jane in The Jane Show. In 2008, Waisglass was cast in her first film role in the Gilles Bourdos-directed psychological thriller Afterwards, alongside John Malkovich and Evangeline Lilly. In 2009, she continued her career on television, appearing in 29 episodes of Overruled!. She also appeared in a commercial for KFC. Beginning in 2013, she played Frankie Hollingsworth in the television series Degrassi: The Next Generation.

In 2015, Waisglass was cast in the Anton Corbijn-directed biographical drama film Life, alongside Robert Pattinson and Sir Ben Kingsley. The same year, Waisglass was nominated for "Best Recurring Young Actress 16-21" at the Young Entertainer Awards for her role as Frankie Hollingsworth in Degrassi: The Next Generation.

In 2017, Waisglass played Mary's half-sister Robyn in the Molly McGlynn directed film Mary Goes Round, which featured at the 2017 Toronto International Film Festival. In 2020, she starred as Madison St. Claire in eight episodes of the supernatural drama series October Faction.

In 2021, Waisglass starred as Maxine in the Netflix comedy series Ginny and Georgia, in a cast that included Brianne Howey, Antonia Gentry, Chelsea Clark and Katie Douglas. After the Season 2 release, Ginny & Georgia was the most-watched title from January to June 2023 on Netflix, with a combined 967.2M hours viewed between Seasons 1 and 2. In May 2023, the series was renewed for a third and fourth season. The third season is slated to be released on June 5, 2025. It is one of the most anticipated new and returning TV shows of 2025.

== Filmography ==
=== Film ===
Year	Title	Role	Notes
2008	Afterwards	Tracey	Short film
2008	Watering Mr. Cocoa	Amber	
2015	Life	High School Hop Girl	
2017	Mary Goes Round	Robyn	
2018	Sled Serious	Jess	Short film
2020	Tainted	Anna	
2022	Cascade	Alex	
2023	Suze	Brooke	
2026	How to Lose a Popularity Contest	Ellie	

=== Television ===
Year	Title	Role	Notes
2007	The Jane Show	8 year old Jane	Episode: "It's All Relative"
2009–2010	Overruled!	Jordy Cooper	Main cast
2013–2015	Degrassi: The Next Generation	Frankie Hollingsworth	Main cast (Seasons 13–14)
2014	Degrassi: Minis	Frankie Hollingsworth	Episode: "Dress You Up Part Three"
2015	Degrassi: Don't Look Back	Frankie Hollingsworth	TV movie
2016	Holiday Joy	Chanel	TV movie
2016–2017	Degrassi: Next Class	Frankie Hollingsworth	Main cast
2017	The Good Doctor	Olivia Hartman	Episode: "Pipes"
2017	Killjoys	Quin	Episodes: "Reckoning Ball", "The Hullen Have Eyes"
2018	Suits	Teen Esther	Episodes: "Coral Gables", "Bad Man"
2018–2022	Holly Hobbie	Lyla	Recurring role
2020	October Faction	Madison St. Claire	Recurring role
2021–present	Ginny & Georgia	Maxine Baker	Main cast

== Awards and nominations ==
Year	Award	Category	Nominated work	Result	Ref.
2015	Young Entertainer Awards 2015	Best Recurring Young Actress 16-21	Degrassi: The Next Generation	Nominated	
2019	The Joey Awards, Vancouver	Best Television or Webseries Ensemble (shared)	Holly Hobbie	Nominated	
