= Felix Mallard =

Australian actor (born 1998)

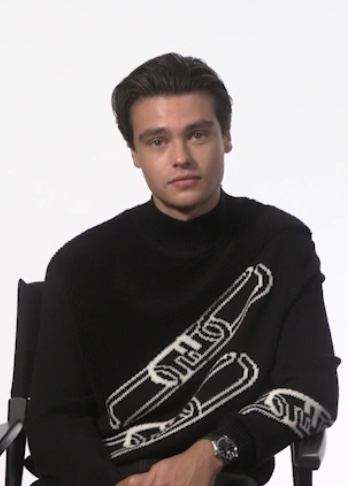
- Mallard in 2022
- Born: 20 April 1998 (age 28); Melbourne, Victoria, Australia
- Occupation: Actor
- Years active: 2014–present

Felix Mallard (born 20 April 1998) is an Australian actor and musician. He began his career playing Ben Kirk in the soap opera Neighbours (2014–2019). He has since starred in the CBS comedy Happy Together (2018–2019) and in the Netflix series Ginny & Georgia (2021–present). He also had recurring roles in Locke & Key (2020–2021), also on Netflix, and in the second season of Zoey's Extraordinary Playlist (2021) on NBC.

== Early life and education ==
Felix Mallard was on born 20 April 1998 in Australia. He has a sister.

He attended the all-boys school Christian Brothers College, now St Mary's College, in the Melbourne suburb of St Kilda, where he was a prefect student. He completed the Victorian Certificate of Education (VCE) in 2015, as well as a course in technical production. In his VCE, he received a 40 study score in his media subject.

Mallard took up fencing at the age of ten. He competed at state and national levels, winning two bronze medals in the team events at the 2012 Victorian National Champions and 5th place in the under-15 National Sabre Championships in 2013.

When he was 13, Mallard was scouted by a modelling agent and signed with Vivien's Models. He featured in several campaigns, including an editorial spread in Yves magazine.

Mallard is a musician and plays the guitar, piano and drums. He is a guitarist and singer in punk rock band Enemies Alike. The band has played in venues around Melbourne, at school music events, and Associated Catholic Colleges' Battle of the Bands competitions.

== Career ==
Mallard made his acting debut in 2014 at the age of 15, taking over the role of Ben Kirk in the Australian television soap opera Neighbours for a three-week, six episode guest stint. He obtained an audition through his modelling agent, which he unexpectedly won. He had never previously considered acting but this experience made him realise this was what he wanted to do for the rest of his life. He returned the following year for a further 4-month guest stint, while still at school. After finishing Year 12, Mallard chose to pursue acting full-time and he re-joined Neighbours as a permanent cast member in 2016. Mallard's interest in music was incorporated into his character and he frequently played music on the show. That same year, he starred in Xanthe ♥ Ben, a 20-episode online spin-off released on Instagram, as well as the webisode series Summer Stories, broadcast during the 2016 Christmas period. Mallard filmed his final scenes for Neighbours in late 2017. His final storyline as Ben saw him move to his late father's home town of Oakey, Queensland to start over. His final episode aired on 10 April 2018. He made two return appearances by video link, airing on 31 December 2018 and 7 January 2019. He also featured in the music video of Melbourne band Maefire's "Without You" in 2016.

Following his departure from Neighbours, Mallard starred in his former co-star Travis Burns's short film Money Is Just a Barbell, which he also produced and did the music. He moved to the United States at the start of 2018 and quickly secured the role of popstar Cooper James in the CBS comedy series Happy Together, alongside Damon Wayans Jr. and Amber Stevens West. Happy Together is loosely based on the experiences of English singer Harry Styles, who moved in with television producer Ben Winston and his family to escape the spotlight when the pop band One Direction exploded in popularity. After being offered the role by the television show's producer Winston, Mallard received telephone calls from Harry Styles and James Corden, who convinced him to accept the role. Mallard initially auditioned with an American accent, but was asked to switch to his native Australian accent. The show debuted on 1 October 2018, but after mediocre ratings, it was announced on 28 November 2018, that CBS had declined to order additional episodes of the series beyond the initial order of thirteen. CBS cancelled the show on 10 May 2019.

Mallard went on to play the recurring role of Lucas Caravaggio in the Netflix horror series Locke & Key: a 17-year-old friend of Rendell Locke, who died 25 years earlier, after being possessed by a demon. Filming took place in the first half of 2019. It was released on 7 February 2020. He appeared in the romantic drama film All the Bright Places, which began filming in October 2018 and was also released by Netflix in February 2020. The film is an adaptation of Jennifer Niven's 2015 young adult novel of the same name.

In 2021, Mallard began a recurring role in the second season of the musical comedy-drama series Zoey's Extraordinary Playlist on NBC, as Zoey's neighbour – an Australian musician, who recently graduated from college and has returned from backpacking in Thailand. The role included performing a number of songs and dancing.

Mallard plays series regular Marcus, an edgy 15-year-old, in the Netflix dramedy Ginny & Georgia. Mallard was required to learn American Sign Language for the role, as his character's father is deaf. Filming took place in Toronto during the second half of 2019 and the series was released on 24 February 2021. Ginny & Georgia was renewed for a second season, after season one was watched by 52 million viewers within 28 days, making it Netflix's tenth most watched series. It aired on January 5, 2023. The popularity of the show saw Mallard's following on Instagram increase from 90,000 to over 3 million, after its release. After the Season 2 release, Ginny & Georgia was the most-watched title from January to June 2023 on Netflix, with a combined 967.2M hours viewed between Seasons 1 and 2. In May 2023, the series was renewed for a third and fourth season. The third season was released on June 5, 2025.

Later in 2021, he returned to the second season of Locke & Key, appearing in the final episode.

Mallard starred as Davis Pickett in the 2024 movie adaptation of “Turtles All The Way Down” by John Green. The movie was released on May 2, 2024 on MAX.

In June 2025, Mallard was named in the cast of Goolagong in the role of Roger Cawley, the husband of Aboriginal Australian tennis player champion Evonne Goolagong Cawley.

== Filmography ==
Year	Title	Role	Notes
2014–2019	Neighbours	Ben Kirk	Recurring (2014–2015), Main cast (2016–2018), Guest (2018–2019)
2016	Xanthe ♥ Ben	Ben Kirk	Web series
2016	Pipe Up	Ben Kirk	Web series; Episode: "Sheep"
2016	Summer Stories	Ben Kirk	Web series
2018	Money Is Just a Barbell	Homeless guy	Short film. Also Producer and Music.
2018–2019	Happy Together	Cooper James	Main cast
2020	All the Bright Places	Roamer	
2020–2021	Locke & Key	Lucas Caravaggio	Recurring role
2021	Zoey's Extraordinary Playlist	Aiden	Recurring role, Season 2
2021–present	Ginny & Georgia	Marcus Baker	Main cast
2024	Turtles All the Way Down	Davis Picket	Main cast
2026	Goolagong	Roger Cawley	TV miniseries
