= Amber Stevens West =

American actress (born 1986)

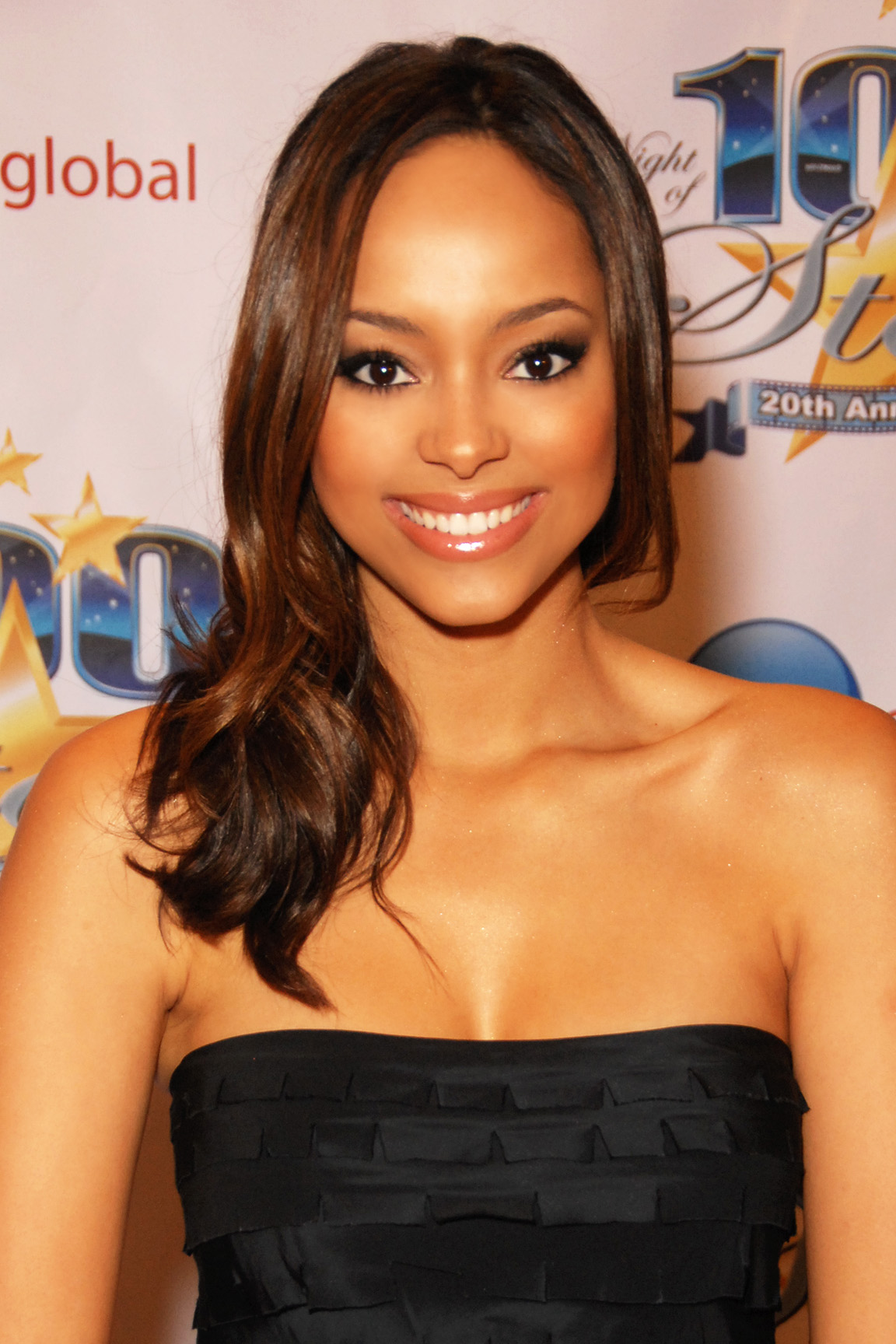
- Stevens West at 2010 the "Night of 100 Stars"
- Born: Amber Dawn Stevens; October 7, 1986 (age 39); Los Angeles, California, U.S.
- Occupation: Actress
- Years active: 2005–present
- Spouse: Andrew J. West (m. 2014)
- Children: 3
- Father: Shadoe Stevens

Amber Dawn Stevens West (born October 7, 1986) is an American actress. She is known for her roles as Ashleigh Howard in the ABC Family series Greek (2007–2011), Maxine in the NBC sitcom The Carmichael Show (2015–2017), and Claire Davis in the CBS comedy Happy Together (2018–2019). She has also appeared in films The Amazing Spider-Man (2012), 22 Jump Street (2014) and Jessabelle (2014). She played the lead role of Maya in the 2018 comedy film Love Jacked.

== Early life ==
Stevens West was born Amber Dawn Stevens in Los Angeles, California, the daughter of former model Beverly Cunningham and radio announcer Shadoe Stevens. She has a younger sister named Chyna and an older paternal half-brother named Brad. Stevens is of mixed ethnicity, being born to a white father and African-American mother who is also part Comanche.

Stevens West is a graduate of Beverly Hills High School.

== Career ==
Early in her career, she appeared in television commercials for Old Navy, Verizon, Logitech and Neutrogena. She made her television acting debut in an episode of Complete Savages in 2005. In 2007, Stevens West began portraying Ashleigh Howard on the ABC Family comedy-drama television series Greek. In a review released soon after the premiere of the show, the Pittsburgh Post-Gazette called the show "light-hearted fun" and "authentic" while The New York Times claimed that Greek "captures the spirit of the hedge-fund age like nothing else." The series concluded after four seasons on March 7, 2011. She has appeared in films The Fast and the Furious: Tokyo Drift (2006), Fired Up! (2009), The Amazing Spider-Man (2012), The Kitchen (2012) and Jessabelle (2014).

She has appeared in guest roles on How I Met Your Mother, Friends with Benefits, Baby Daddy, 90210, Ben and Kate and New Girl. In 2011, Stevens West played the role of Mimi Marquez in the musical Rent: Downtown L.A. She made a guest appearance as Joy Struthers on CBS' Criminal Minds, in the episode "Fate". In 2014, she appeared as Jonah Hill's character's love interest called Maya in the comedy film 22 Jump Street.

In 2015, Stevens West co-starred opposite Jerrod Carmichael as Maxine in the NBC comedy sitcom The Carmichael Show. In 2017, following that show's end, Stevens West was cast as a series regular on the FOX supernatural comedy series Ghosted. She portrayed a restaurant and bar designer Claire Davis opposite Damon Wayans Jr. on CBS' comedy television series Happy Together (2018–2019). The series followed a young couple whose lives are suddenly thrown into chaos when a pop star moves into their home.

In May 2021, Stevens starred as one of the four leads in the first season of the ensemble comedy Run the World on Starz.

In November 2022, Stevens was a contestant on the daytime game show, Pictionary.

== Personal life ==
Stevens began dating actor Andrew J. West after they met while co-starring in Greek. They married on December 5, 2014, in Los Angeles. They have three daughters: Ava Laverne, Winona Marie and Bernadette Maxine.

== Filmography ==
=== Film ===
Year	Title	Role	Notes
2006	The Fast and the Furious: Tokyo Drift	Cheerleader	
2007	The Beast	Aileen	TV movie
2009	Fired Up!	Sara	
2009	Nothing for Something	Heloise	Short
2011	Weekends at Bellevue	Claire Cohen	TV movie
2012	The Madame	Sofi	Short
2012	The Amazing Spider-Man	Ariel	
2012	The Kitchen	Amanda	
2012	The Distance Between	Jen	Short
2012	Joey Dakota	Maya Beaumont	TV movie
2014	22 Jump Street	Maya Dickson	
2014	Jessabelle	Dead Girl	
2014	Keep It Together	Mircea	TV movie
2015	American Girl Dolls: The Action Movie with Anna Chlumsky	Addy Walker	TV movie
2016	The Bet	Daycare Employee	
2018	Love Jacked	Maya	
2018	Public Disturbance	Holly	
2019	The Way We Weren't	Carly	
2020	Christmas Unwrapped	Charity Jones	TV movie
2025	The Christmas Showdown	Chastity	TV movie
2026	The Jealous Bride	Meg	TV movie

=== Television ===
Year	Title	Role	Notes
2005	Complete Savages	Girl #2	Episode: "Teen Things I Hate About You"
2005	The Bold and the Beautiful	Forrester Model	Episode: "Episode #1.4655"
2006	The Hills	Herself	Episode: "Boyfriends And Work Don't Mix"
2006	Made in Hollywood: Teen Edition	Herself	Episode: "Teen Acting Careers with 'Greek'"
2007	CSI: Crime Scene Investigation	Emily Wilson/Tanya	2 episodes
2007–2011	Greek	Ashleigh Howard	Main cast
2011	Grey's Anatomy	Laurel Pinson	Episode: "Start Me Up"
2011	Friends with Benefits	Caroline	Episode: "The Benefit of Mardi Gras"
2011	How I Met Your Mother	Janet McIntyre	Episode: "Mystery vs. History"
2012	Baby Daddy	Izzy	Episode: "The Daddy Whisperer"
2012	90210	Bryce Woodbridge	2 episodes
2012	Ben and Kate	Anna Lewis	Episode: "Reunion"
2013	CollegeHumor Originals	Jasmine	Episode: "Disney Princess Spring Breakers Trailer"
2014	New Girl	Viv	Episode: "Goldmine"
2014–2019	Criminal Minds	Joy Struthers	Recurring cast: season 10, guest: season 11, 14
2015	Your Family or Mine	Sharman	Episode: "The Couch"
2015	Chasing Life	Frankie	2 episodes
2015–2017	The Carmichael Show	Maxine	Main cast
2017–2018	Ghosted	Annie	Main cast
2018–2019	Happy Together	Claire Davis	Main cast
2019	Law & Order: Special Victims Unit	Dallas	Episode: "Diss"
2019	Live in Front of a Studio Audience	Jenny Willis Jefferson	Episode: "Norman Lear's All in the Family and The Jeffersons"
2020	God Friended Me	Julia	Episode: "BFF"
2021–2023	Run the World	Whitney Greene	Main cast
2023	Krapopolis	Athena (voice)	Recurring role
2023	Frasier	Nicole	Episode: "The Fix Is In"
2025–2026	The Neighborhood	Mercedes	Recurring role
