= Noah Lamanna =

Canadian actor

- Born: 28 February 1991 (age 35)
- Occupation: Actor
- Years active: 2012–present

Noah Lamanna (born 28 February 1991) is a Canadian actor. They have appeared in television series such as Star Trek: Strange New Worlds, The Last of Us, and Ginny & Georgia.

== Early life and career ==
Noah Lamanna was born on 28 February 1991. They grew up in Newmarket, Ontario, and were interested in acting from an early age, starting to act at the age of 7, attending the Peter Stanton School of Dance and joining the Arts Spotlight Theatre Company and Marquee Theatrical Productions. Lamanna also works on their own scripts, enjoying the excitement of production as well as performing.

Lamanna was in an episode of American Gods in 2021 and The Umbrella Academy in 2022. In 2023, they joined the cast of the science fiction series Star Trek: Strange New Worlds in the role of the transport boss Jay, and portrayed Naomi in the film World's Best and Jessie in Dream Scenario. From May to June 2023, Lamanna played Eli in the play Let the Right One In for the Berkeley Repertory Theatre, directed by John Tiffany. Lamanna's performance received praise; Judith Saunders, writing in Comparative Drama, lauded Lamanna for bringing "the right kind of sexual indeterminacy" to the role, particularly in their "other-worldly" physique and "expert body movement", and the Bay Area Reporter called their performance "compelling, bone-deep", providing "occasional breakthrough moments of shivery pleasure". In 2024, Lamanna portrayed Dev in the television series Beacon 23, and Suzo Jones in the film Paying for It.

Lamanna portrays Kat in the second season of The Last of Us; their casting was announced on 4 March 2025. They were approached to audition for the series and were cast shortly after sending a tape. Lamanna wrote a lot of backstory for Kat to better understand the character. They filmed an audition tape for the third season of Ginny & Georgia in a hotel bathroom during production of The Last of Us; they booked the role a few days before filming. Their role as Tris was announced in September 2024. Lamanna enjoyed Tris's "light, chill, down-to-earth" attitude in contrast to the other characters. They are set to return for the fourth season.

Lamanna appeared in Hubert Davis's 2025 film The Well, for which they were nominated for Outstanding Performance – Non-Binary/Gender Non-Conforming at the 24th ACTRA Awards in Toronto.

== Personal life ==
Lamanna is genderqueer and identifies with the pronouns they/them. They reside in Toronto, Canada, near their favourite town of Kensington Market, where they work at the St. Stephen-in-the-Fields Anglican Church. Lamanna is of Chinese descent.

== Filmography ==
=== Film ===
Year	Title	Role	Notes
2012	The Last Movie	Maelee Jacobi	
2017	Another Spring	Connie	Short film
2019	Spaces	Kaari 25	Short film
2020	Pigs	Marlowe	Short film
2022	Forgive Us Our Trespasses	Young Woman	Short film
2022	Luckiest Girl Alive	Hostess	
2022	The Breakup	V	Short film
2022	Medium Young	Charlie	Short film
2023	World's Best	Naomi	
2023	Dream Scenario	Jessie	
2024	Out of My Mind	Servant of Linguini	
2024	Nola	Maite D'Fran	Short film
2024	I Only Kiss in the Dark	Margot	Short film
2024	Paying for It	Suzo Jones	
2025	The Well	Milly	

=== Television ===
Year	Title	Role	Notes
2012	Copper	Ada Moretti	Episode: "Arsenic and Old Cake"
2019	Mayday: Air Disasters	Passenger	Episode: "Lethal Limits"
2020	The D Cut	Elisha	Episode: "Undercut"
2020	Private Eyes	PR Rep	Episode: "The Proof Is Out There"
2021	American Gods	Friend of Laura's Dad	Episode: "Ashes and Demons"
2021	See	Aromatic Chef	Episode: "The Compass"
2021	Canadian Reflections	Marlowe	Episode: "P!GS"
2022	The Kings of Napa	Nurse	Episode: "Bamboozeled"
2022	Topline	Sabriel	
2022	The Umbrella Academy	Nice Waitress	Episode: "World's Biggest Ball of Twine"
2022	Avocado Toast	Naran	Episode: "With a Side of... Coming HOMEfries"
2022	EZRA	Sam	Episode: "Thirsty"
2022	Ghostwriter	The Witch	Episode: "Ghost of Oz, Part 3"
2023	Shelved	Jo	Episode: "Moby Dick FICTION MEL"
2023	Star Trek: Strange New Worlds	Chief Jay	4 episodes
2024	Beacon 23	Dev	4 episodes
2025	The Last of Us	Kat	2 episodes ("Future Days" and "The Price")
2025–present	Ginny & Georgia	Tris	Recurring role; seasons 3–4

== Theatre ==
Year	Title	Role	Notes
2023	Let the Right One In	Eli	Berkeley Repertory Theatre
