= Diesel La Torraca =

Australian actor (born 2011)

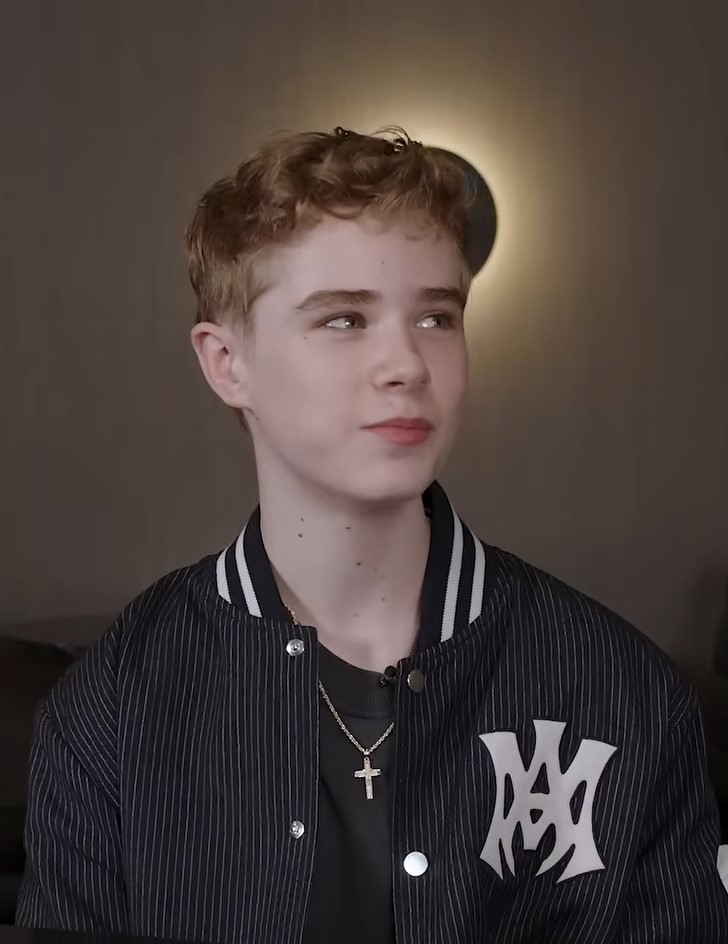
- La Torraca in 2025
- Born: 1 March 2011 (age 15); Australia
- Occupation: Actor
- Years active: 2016–present
- Known for: Ginny & Georgia; Little Monsters; Lambs of God

Diesel La Torraca (born 1 March 2011) is an Australian child actor best known for his role as Austin Miller in the Netflix television series Ginny & Georgia. He began acting at age five and has appeared in films and series such as Little Monsters (2019) and Lambs of God (2019).

In 2021, La Torraca received a nomination for Best Performance in a TV Series at the Young Artist Award for his role in La Brea.

== Early life ==
Diesel La Torraca was born on 1 March 2011 in Australia and raised in Collaroy, Sydney's Northern Beaches. His mother, Joanne Hunt, is an Australian actress who has appeared on series such as Home and Away and in films like Restraint. He has an older sister named Dallas La Torraca.

== Career ==
La Torraca began acting at the age of five, initially appearing in commercials and minor television roles. In 2019, he played Felix in the comedy-horror film Little Monsters, alongside Lupita Nyong'o, and Ben Jones in the Foxtel miniseries Lambs of God. His performance in the latter earned him a nomination for Best Male New Talent at the 2019 AACTA Awards.

He later appeared in television series such as The Secrets She Keeps and Black Comedy. In 2021, La Torraca was cast as Austin Miller in the Netflix series Ginny & Georgia, which premiered on 24 February 2021. He reprised the role in subsequent seasons, with his character involved in storylines exploring trauma and family dynamics.

Also in 2021, he portrayed Isaiah in the fantasy drama series La Brea and provided a voice role in the animated film Back to the Outback. In 2023, he appeared as Ace in the series Tyler Perry's Young Dylan.

== Personal life ==
Relocating between Australia and the United States, La Torraca also resides in Los Angeles. Beyond acting, he is active on social media and plays basketball recreationally.

== Filmography ==
=== Film ===
Year	Title	Role
2019	Little Monsters	Felix
2019	Sweet Tooth	Hansel
2020	Heroes for a Day	Jessie
2021	Back to the Outback	Chazzie
2024	Curve Bro's Parents Gets Arrested and Executed: The Movie	Randy Rash
2024	Unsung Hero	Joel Smallbone

=== Television ===
Year	Title	Role
2019	Lambs of God	Ben Jones
2020	The Secrets She Keeps	Elijah
2020	Black Comedy	Guest
2021–22	La Brea	Isaiah
2021–present	Ginny & Georgia	Austin Miller
2023	Tyler Perry's Young Dylan	Ace
2025	It: Welcome to Derry	Young Francis Shaw

== Awards and nominations ==
Year	Award	Category	Nominated work	Result
2019	9th AACTA Awards	Best Male New Talent	Lambs of God	Nominated
2021	Young Artist Award	Best Performance	La Brea	Nominated
