= Sarah Lampert =

American television producer and writer

- Occupations: Television producer; Screenwriter
- Years active: 2021–present

Sarah Lampert is an American television producer and screenwriter. She is known for creating the Netflix series Ginny & Georgia.

== Career ==
Lampert graduated from Muhlenberg College in 2010. In 2017, she submitted the TV script I Love College to the Launch Pad Pilot competition.

Lampert had her career breakthrough upon the release of the first season of her Netflix series Ginny & Georgia on February 24, 2021. In April 2021, the series was renewed for a second season, which premiered on January 5, 2023. In May 2023, the series was renewed for third and fourth seasons. The third season was released on June 5, 2025. The series became one of the most popular streaming series of all time. Following the release of season two, the series featured in the Nielsen top 10 for eight weeks. Season two now resides in the all-time top 10 English language shows with 504.77 million hours watched globally in the first 28 days. After the Season 2 release, Ginny & Georgia was the most-watched title from January to June 2023 on Netflix, with a combined 967.2M hours viewed between Seasons 1 and 2.
