= David Monahan =

American actor

- Born: August 13, 1971 (age 54); North Olmsted, Ohio
- Education: Harvard University (BA)
- Years active: 2000–present
- Spouse: Larry Sullivan
- Children: 1

David Harold Monahan (born August 13, 1971) is an American actor, best known for recurring roles on Crossing Jordan as Detective Matt Seely and Dawson's Creek as Tobey Barret. He has also appeared in such films as The Last Supper (2000), The Mostly Unfabulous Social Life of Ethan Green (2005) and Something New (2006). He also appeared in the Supernatural episode "Houses of the Holy".

Monahan was born in North Olmsted, Ohio. A 1989 graduate of Bishop O'Connell High School (in Arlington County, Virginia), Monahan graduated from Harvard University with an honor degree in government.

Monahan's husband is actor Larry Sullivan; they have one adopted child together. The couple was featured in a Campbell's Soup ad released in 2015.

== Filmography ==
Genre	Year	Title	Role	Episodes	Notes
TV series	2000	Dawson's Creek	Tobey Barret	"Self Reliance"	7 episodes total
Short film	2000	The Last Supper	Rollins		23 minutes
Film	2000	This Is Not an Exit: The Fictional World of Bret Easton Ellis	Hamlin		
TV series	2001	Dawson's Creek	Tobey Barret	"The Te of Pacey" "Hopeless" "Late" "Promicide" "The Graduate" "Use Your Disillusion"	7 episodes total
TV series	2001	The Geena Davis Show	Tim	"The Prime Directive"	
TV series	2003	Angel	Garrett	"Players"	
TV series	2003	NCIS	P.O. Drew	"Sub Rosa"	
TV series	2003	Sabrina, the Teenage Witch	Aaron's Friend	"Sabrina in Wonderland"	
TV series	2004	Crossing Jordan	Detective Matt Seely	"Second Chances" "Revealed" "Out of Sight" "Blue Moon" "What Happens in Vegas Dies in Boston"	14 episodes total
Short film	2005	A.M.D.G.: A World Is Not Enough	Francis Xavier		26 minutes
TV series	2005	Cold Case	Evan	"Ravaged"	
TV series	2005	Crossing Jordan	Detective Matt Seely	"Murder in the Rue Morgue" "Gray Murders" "Locard's Exchange" "Forget Me Not" "There's No Place Like Home II" "Death Goes On"	14 episodes total
Film	2005	The Mostly Unfabulous Social Life of Ethan Green	Leo Worth		
TV series	2006	Crossing Jordan	Detective Matt Seely	"Loves Me Not" "The Elephant in the Room"	14 episodes total
Film	2006	Something New	Bill Lebree		
Film	2006	Kalamazoo?	Jim Sanderson		
TV series	2007	Crossing Jordan	Detective Matt Seely	"Seven Feet Under"	14 episodes total
TV series	2007	Supernatural	Father Thomas Gregory	"Houses of the Holy"	
TV series	2007	Tell Me You Love Me	Alex	"Episode #1.4"	
TV series	2008	Criminal Minds	Deacon Rogers	"In Heat"	
TV series	2008	Say Goodnight	Bernard		
TV series	2008	The Starter Wife	Julian	"The Ex-Files"	
TV series	2008	Swingtown	Henry	"Get Down Tonight" "Surprise!" "Take It to the Limit"	
Film	2009	Acts of Mercy	Dr. Ed Grey		
TV series	2009	Kathy Griffin: My Life on the D-List	Himself	"Paris Is My New BFF"	
TV series	2009	The Mentalist	George Doverton	"A Price Above Rubies"	
TV series	2009	Privileged	Keith	"All About What Lies Beneath" "All About the Big Picture" "All About Betrayal" "All About a Brand New You!"	
TV series	2010	House M.D.	Jay	"Baggage"	
Film	2010	Miss Nobody			
TV series	2010	NCIS: Los Angeles	Jon Donnelly	"Past Lives"	
TV series	2011	Dexter	Nathan Roberts	"Once Upon a Time..." "Smokey and the Bandit"	
TV series	2011	Rizzoli & Isles	Tom Payson	"Living Proof"	
Film	2012	The Dark Knight Rises	Applied Sciences Tech No. 2		
TV miniseries	2012	Political Animals	Congressman Sean Reeves	"Lost Boys"	
TV series	2012	Revenge	Alexander Barrol	"Duress"	
TV series	2017	Big Little Lies	Bernard		
