= Brianne Howey =

American actress (born 1989)

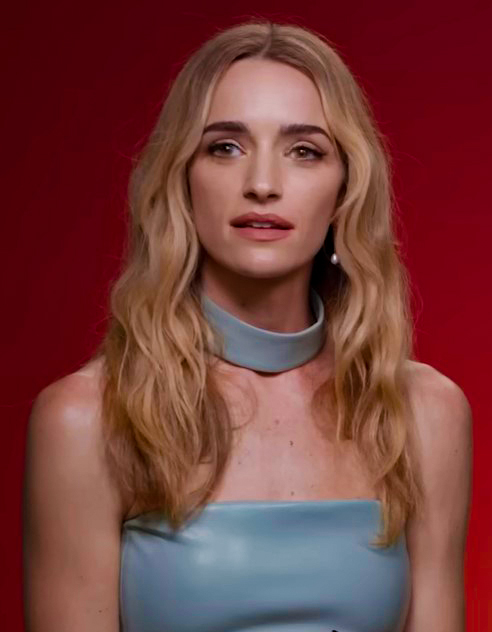
- Howey in 2025
- Born: May 24, 1989 (age 37); Los Angeles, California
- Education: New York University
- Occupation: Actress
- Years active: 2008–present
- Spouse: Matt Ziering (m. 2021)
- Children: 2

Brianne Howey (born May 24, 1989) is an American actress. She is best known for her role as Georgia Miller in the Netflix series Ginny & Georgia. She has also gained recognition with main roles in the Fox series The Exorcist (2016) and The Passage (2019) and a recurring role in the first season of The CW's superhero drama Batwoman (2019–2020) as Reagan.

In 2024, she starred as Molly Turner in the Farrelly brothers holiday comedy Dear Santa. In 2025, she starred in Happy Madison Netflix film Kinda Pregnant.

== Early life ==
Howey was born on May 24, 1989. Howey was raised by a single mother, from whom she later took inspiration for her role as Georgia Miller in the Netflix television show Ginny & Georgia, and is the oldest of five siblings.

She attended Flintridge Sacred Heart Academy, an all girls' Catholic high school in La Cañada Flintridge, California, where she joined the improv team. She continued her acting education and studied theatre at New York University Tisch School of the Arts, and the Lee Strasberg Theatre and Film Institute. During her time in college, she starred in the NYU student short films Suckerpunch in 2008, Appropriate Sex in 2009, and Party Favours in 2010.

== Career ==
Howey is perhaps best known starring as Georgia Miller in the Netflix series Ginny & Georgia. The series was released on February 24, 2021, and quickly became popular, attracting 52 million viewers on Netflix. It was renewed for a second season on April 19, 2021. After the Season 2 release, Ginny & Georgia was the most-watched title from January to June 2023 on Netflix, with a combined 967.2M hours viewed between Seasons 1 and 2. In May 2023, the series was renewed for a third and fourth season. The third season was released on June 5, 2025.

Her first television role was on 90210, when she played Stacey while continuing at NYU. After graduating, she booked a recurring role in the ABC comedy The Middle and the ABC drama Revenge. She also starred in Twisted Tales in 2013.

In 2014, Howey played Candy in the comedy film Horrible Bosses 2 alongside Jason Bateman, Jason Sudeikis, and Charlie Day.

In 2015, Howey moved to London to film her first series regular starring role which was in the Comedy Central UK television series I Live with Models, which aired for two seasons. During that time, Brianne recurred in the Fox series Scream Queens and the Showtime series I'm Dying Up Here.

In 2016, Howey landed the role of Kat Rance in the television series The Exorcist, as the sister of the possessed girl played by Hannah Kasulka, with Geena Davis and Alan Ruck playing their parents.

In 2019, Howey starred as Shauna Babcock, a "Viral", in Justin Cronin's The Passage. The same year, Howey began a recurring role as Alison B. in Hulu's Dollface. She returned for season 2 in February 2022. She also had a role in the 2019 romantic comedy Plus One.

In 2024, she starred as “Molly Turner” in the Farrelly brothers holiday comedy Dear Santa. In 2025, she starred in Happy Madison Netflix film Kinda Pregnant.

== Personal life ==
She has been married to California-based lawyer Matt Ziering since 2021, with whom she has two daughters, born in 2023 and 2026 respectively.

Brianne has stated on Molly Sims' podcast, Lipstick on the Rim, that she has converted to Judaism.

== Filmography ==
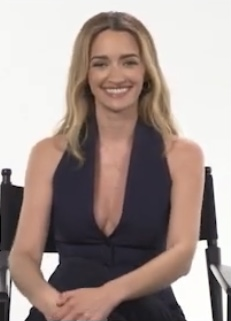
Brianne Howey in 2022

=== Film ===
Year	Title	Role	Notes
2014	ETXR	Cece	
2014	Horrible Bosses 2	Candy	
2016	Super Novas	Tiffany	
2016	Viral	Tara Dannelly	
2016	The Lonely Whale	Coffee Shop Hipster	
2016	XOXO	Darla	
2017	Time Trap	Jackie	
2018	Little Bitches	Sarah Richter	
2019	Plus One	Jess Ramsey	
2024	Dear Santa	Molly Turner	
2025	Kinda Pregnant	Megan Taylor	

=== Television ===
Year	Title	Role	Notes
2010	90210	Stacey	Episode: "The Bachelors"
2011	NCIS	High school girl	Episode: "Restless"
2011–2012	The Middle	Emily	2 episodes
2012	Revenge	Eve	3 episodes
2013	Baby Daddy	Susie Kettle	Episode: "I'm Not That Guy"
2013	Twisted Tales	Susan	Episode: "Bite"
2013	Red Scare	Audrey Stone	Web series; main role
2013	Criminal Minds	Heather Clarke	2 episodes
2014	Hart of Dixie	Lulabelle	Episode: "A Better Man"
2014	Twisted	Whitney Taylor	4 episodes
2014	Playing House	Cecilia	Episode: "Bosephus and the Catfish"
2015	Scream Queens	Melanie Dorkus	2 episodes
2015	Hawaii Five-0	Lia	Episode: "Na Pilikua Nui"
2015–2017	I Live with Models	Scarlet	Lead role
2016	The Odd Couple	Allyson	Episode: "From Here to Maturity"
2016–2017	The Exorcist	Katherine "Kat" Rance	Lead role (season 1)
2017	I'm Dying Up Here	Kay	3 episodes
2019	The Passage	Shauna Babcock	Lead role
2019–2020	Batwoman	Reagan	4 episodes
2019–2022	Dollface	Alison B.	Recurring role, 7 episodes
2021–present	Ginny & Georgia	Georgia Miller / Mary Rose Reilly-Adkins	Lead role; 30 episodes
2023	Celebrity Jeopardy!	Herself	Contestant
