= Antonia Gentry =

American actress (born 1997)

- Gentry in 2026
- Born: Antonia Bonea Gentry; September 25, 1997 (age 29); Atlanta, Georgia, U.S.
- Education: Emory University
- Occupation: Actress
- Years active: 2014–present

Antonia Bonea Gentry (born September 25, 1997) is an American actress. After early roles in short film and television announcements, she made her feature film debut in the Netflix romance Candy Jar (2018).

Gentry had her breakthrough with the lead role of troubled teenager Virginia "Ginny" Miller in the Netflix comedy drama series Ginny & Georgia (2021–present). In 2024, she acted in the streaming films Prom Dates and Time Cut.

== Early life and education ==
Antonia Gentry was born in Atlanta, Georgia. Her mother is from Jamaica, and her father is American. She has said that she wanted to be an actress from the age of 5.

She studied theatre at the John S. Davidson Fine Arts Magnet School in Augusta, Georgia. She also attended Emory University, where she studied drama. At Emory, she was a member of the university's comedy-improv troupe, Rathskellar Comedy Improv Group. Before her graduation in 2019, she balanced acting roles with being a full-time college student in addition to having a part-time job.

== Career ==
Gentry has acted in a variety of smaller roles, including two shorts in 2015. In 2018, she played Jasmine in the romantic comedy feature film Candy Jar and acted in one episode of superhero television series, Raising Dion.

She graduated from Emory in the same week that she got an audition for Ginny & Georgia. She won the role and, in 2021, the series was released on Netflix. Gentry is also featured in a starring role in the 2024 coming of age comedy Prom Dates.

== Personal life ==
Gentry adopted a cat, named Buttersworth, during her senior year of college.

== Filmography ==
=== Film ===
Year	Title	Role	Notes
2015	Lone Wolf Mason	Madison	Short
2018	Candy Jar	Jasmine Spencer	Netflix film
2024	Prom Dates	Jess	Hulu film
2024	Time Cut	Summer Lucy Field	Netflix film

=== Television ===
Year	Title	Role	Notes
2014	Dont Text and Drive Pay Attention	Teenage Driver	Public service announcement
2015	Driver's Ed: Tales from the Street	Sara	Public service announcement
2019	Raising Dion	Wendy	Episode: "ISSUE #104: Welcome to BIONA. Hope You Survive the Experience"
2021–present	Ginny & Georgia	Virginia "Ginny" Miller	Lead role

== Awards and nominations ==
Year	Organization	Category	Nominated work	Result
2021	MTV Movie & TV Awards	Best Breakthrough Performance	Ginny & Georgia	Nominated
