= Black Field =

Black Field may refer to:

- Black Field (2009 Canadian film), a Canadian historical drama film
- Black Field (2009 Greek film), a Greek film directed by Vardis Marinakis

== See also ==
- Blackfield (disambiguation)
