= Spoonful (disambiguation) =

Spoonful is a Willie Dixon song covered by Howlin' Wolf, Etta James and Cream

- measuring spoon
- Spoonful.com
- Spoonful, album by Jimmy Witherspoon
- Spoonful, album by John Hammond, Jr.
- Spoonful, album by Will Hoge
- Spoonful (Reacher episode), a 2022 TV episode
