= Georgia Miller =

Georgia Miller may refer to:

- Sasha Miller (born 1933), née Georgia Miller, American fantasy author
- Georgia Fudge, also known as Georgia Miller, American bodybuilder
- Georgia Miller, one of the main characters of the American TV show Ginny & Georgia
