= New York's Finest =

New York's Finest may refer to:

- New York City Police Department
- "New York's Finest" (Daredevil), a 2016 TV episode
- "New York's Finest" (Reacher), a 2024 TV episode
