= Level 16 =

2018 Canadian film by Danishka Esterhazy

Level 16 (After)
- Movie studio poster
- Directed by: Danishka Esterhazy
- Written by: Danishka Esterhazy
- Produced by: Judy Holm; Stephanie Chapelle; Michael McNamara
- Starring: Katie Douglas; Celina Martin; Peter Outerbridge; Sara Canning
- Cinematography: Samy Inayeh
- Edited by: Jorge Weisz
- Production companies: Markham Street Films; Dark Sky Films
- Release date: February 20, 2018 (Berlin International Film Festival)
- Running time: 103 minutes
- Country: Canada
- Languages: English; Russian

Level 16 is a 2018 Canadian science fiction thriller film written and directed by Danishka Esterhazy. It follows a group of girls who live at a "school" which educates them about how to be perfect young women for families that they are told will eventually adopt them. Two girls work together to uncover the truth about their captivity.

== Plot ==
Vestalis is an isolated, windowless boarding school run with strict military precision. Girls, who live on numbered levels, are taught to follow the "feminine virtues" of obedience, cleanliness, patience, humility, purity, sweetness, and modesty while avoiding "vices" such as curiosity, anger, sentimentality, sloth, selfishness, hysteria and rebellion. The girls are told the school protects them from the toxic outside air, and that they are being prepared for adoption by high society members, who only want "clean" girls. Rule breaking results in punishment on the lower level, which all universally fear. Best friends Sophia and Vivien line up with Level 10 girls to wash their faces in an allotted time. When Vivien helps Sophia, who dropped her jar of face cream, she exceeds her time limit. The guards drag away Vivien, who is crying and screaming in terror.

Years later, Vivien and other girls are moved to Level 16 (the final level). Vivien and Sophia are reunited after years apart. Sophia warns Vivien not to take the daily vitamins, which she says are powerful sedatives. That night, guards carry away Vivien who pretends to be asleep, and another girl, Olivia, taking them to a lounge. There, Miss Brixil, the facility manager, shows both to an aging couple, who choose Olivia. When the girls are returned to their dormitory, Vivien escapes into the hall, but the outer door requires key card access. Throughout the night, several girls are taken to the lounge and subsequently returned. Miss Brixil, talking to an unseen person on the phone, expresses concern about a guard named Alex, warning that he should not be allowed around the girls unsupervised.

The Level 16 girls meet the facility's doctor, Dr. Miro, who says a fever is spreading in the other halls. He gives them a "vaccine" which causes painful arm rashes, while one girl has a seizure. He initially acts kindly towards Vivien, but when she shares her concerns with him, he injects her with a sedative. Sophia informs Vivien that Alex, the guard Miss Brixil was concerned about, secretly enters the dormitory and "touches" the girls while they sleep. She plans to wait until Alex comes into the dormitory, restrain him, and steal his key card. Shortly afterwards, Ava reports Vivien for unclean behavior and she is locked in a small cage for the night. That night, Sophia attacks Alex and steals his key card but she is captured before freeing Vivien.

Brixil and Miro inform the girls that they are unable to find the stolen key card and want to know where Sophia hid it. When no one answers, Rita is taken downstairs for punishment with a warning that each day one girl will be punished until the card is found. Privately, Brixil and Miro discuss the school's dwindling funds and the pressure (ostensibly by powerful criminals) to produce results.

During the night, Vivien finds the key card hidden behind Sophia's headboard. It does not work, but she uses it to remove the door hinge screws. She frees Sophia and they enter a crude operating room filled with corpses; Rita is among the dead, her facial skin removed. Vivien insists they leave immediately, but Sophia refuses to go without the others. While Sophia goes to get them, Vivien finds a promotional video in the lounge revealing that the facility is actually a rejuvenation clinic run by Miro; the girls are raised in a sterile environment, with no exposure to damaging sunlight, so that their facial skin can be transplanted onto wealthy buyers.

Sophia warns the other girls, but they are skeptical until Vivien, who found and drugged Brixel, brings her in. Brixel admits that Sophia is telling the truth. After locking Brixil in the cage, they lead the others from the facility. Guards pursue them when the door alarm goes off. During a struggle, Sophia is injured, but she and Vivien escape into a shed. When the guards are unable to open the secured door, Miro arrives and attempts to deceive Vivien into coming outside; he reveals that their birth parents sold the girls to the facility as infants. Vivien, aware that Miro only cares about her face, cuts herself with a scalpel she found. Soon, facility henchmen arrive and lead Miro away to be terminated for his failure. An exhausted Sophia and Vivien fall asleep inside the shed. They are awakened the next morning as the door is broken down by police and emergency service workers. The other girls have been rescued and the criminal operation is exposed. As Sophia and Vivien are led to safety, they experience sunlight for the first time.

== Cast ==
- Katie Douglas as Vivien
- Celina Martin as Sophia
- Peter Outerbridge as Dr. Miro
- Sara Canning as Miss Brixil
- Amalia Williamson as Rita

In addition, Sheila McCarthy is credited with a special appearance as Mrs. Denison, the woman shopping for fresh skin.

== Production ==
=== Filming ===
Filming took place in a former police station in Toronto that was built in the 1930s. Esterhazy was given complete freedom to use and adjust the building in any way she saw fit, and used this to create a "very real and gritty" set.

The film was slated to have its television premiere on August 24, 2019 on CBC Television.

=== Casting ===
The role of Doctor Miro was portrayed by Peter Outerbridge, an actor who director Danishka Esterhazy had admired for years. Sara Canning, a friend of Esterhazy who played the lead part on her first feature film Black Field, was cast as Brixil in a role that was specifically written for her by Esterhazy. Katie Douglas, who was cast as Vivien, was an emerging young actress who impressed upon her first audition. Of Douglas' performance, Esterhazy said "Every day on set she would surprise me—in the very best way."

== Reception ==
On the review aggregator website Rotten Tomatoes, 83% of 24 critics' reviews are positive, with an average rating of 6.9/10. Metacritic, which uses a weighted average, assigned the film a score of 46 out of 100, based on 5 critics, indicating "mixed or average" reviews.
