= Sara Canning =

Canadian actress (born 1987)

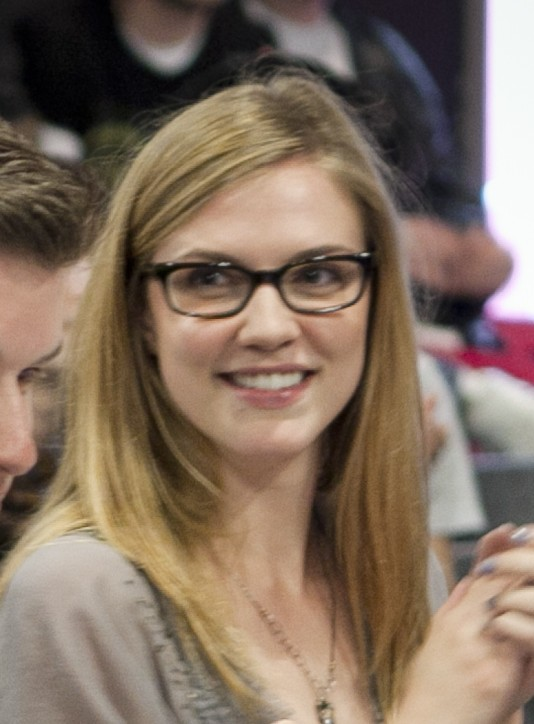
- Canning in May 2011
- Born: July 14, 1987 (age 39); Gander, Newfoundland and Labrador, Canada
- Occupation: Actress
- Years active: 2008–present

Sara Canning (born July 14, 1987) is a Canadian actress. She co-starred in the CW television series The Vampire Diaries as Jenna Sommers and appeared in the 2009 feature film Black Field. She starred as Dylan Weir in the Canadian television series Primeval: New World and as Dr. Melissa Conner on the Global medical drama Remedy. Canning appeared in the 2017 theatrical film War for the Planet of the Apes. She is also known for her role as Jacquelyn Scieszka in the Netflix TV series A Series of Unfortunate Events.

== Early life ==
Canning was born in Gander, Newfoundland, Canada, the daughter of Wayne and Daphne Canning. She lived in Brown's Arm, Newfoundland, until age eleven, and was then raised in Sherwood Park, near Edmonton, Alberta. She competed as a figure skater in her childhood and early adolescent years, and became interested in theatre as a student at F.R. Haythorne Junior High. Canning starred in several stage productions while attending Bev Facey Community High School, and acted in shows at her hometown stage at Festival Place.

Canning made her professional acting debut in George Orwell's 1984 at the Citadel Theatre in Edmonton at the age of 18. She began studying general arts at the University of Alberta, and considered going into journalism. Still interested in performing, Canning left university at 19 and moved to Vancouver to pursue a career in acting. She graduated from a year-long screen acting program at Vancouver Film School in 2007.

== Career ==
Canning found an agent and began acting in television series and TV films produced in Vancouver. She worked in a restaurant and would take time off to film. Her first role was in 2008, playing Nicky Hilton in Paparazzi Princess: The Paris Hilton Story. In 2009, she guest-starred on Smallville and Kyle XY, and starred in the based-on-real-events TV movie, Taken in Broad Daylight. She played Anne Sluti, a 17-year- old girl who was abducted by a demented criminal (James Van Der Beek).

In 2009, Canning filmed a pilot episode for the CW network television series The Vampire Diaries. She then starred in the feature film, Black Field, a 19th-century gothic period piece directed by Danishka Esterhazy. Canning shot the drama near Tyndall, Manitoba, Canada in May 2009. She played Maggie McGregor, the older of two British sisters struggling take make their way on the Canadian Prairies. The film premiered at the Vancouver International Film Festival in 2009. The Vampire Diaries series was picked up three weeks after she completed work on the film.

Canning co-starred on The Vampire Diaries as Jenna Sommers, the aunt and guardian of Elena Gilbert (Nina Dobrev), and her younger brother Jeremy (Steven R. McQueen). Canning was younger or the same age as her fellow cast members who played high school students. Makeup artists and the wardrobe team worked to make her look older. Canning also downplayed her Canadian accent for the role. Matthew Davis played her character's love interest, Alaric. Canning appeared on the second season of The Vampire Diaries from 2010–2011, until her character was killed in the episode "The Sun Also Rises".

Canning is interested in writing and directing. As of September 2010, she was co-writing a love story set in the Western time period. In 2011, she worked on a short film noir, titled Corvus, and shot the Lifetime network film, Hunt for the I-5 Killer, in Vancouver. She filmed the Hallmark Movie Channel Western, Hannah's Law, in Calgary, Alberta in late 2011, starring alongside Greyston Holt.

Canning appeared in I Think I Do, which began filming in January 2012 in Edmonton. She starred as Audrey, an event planner who runs a business alongside her two sisters (Mia Kirschner and Jenny Cooper). The romantic comedy aired in 2013 on the W and Lifetime networks. She filmed the independent romantic comedy, The Right Kind of Wrong, in Banff, Alberta in late 2012, starring alongside Ryan Kwanten and Catherine O'Hara, directed by Jeremiah Chechik.

Canning starred in the 2012–2013 Space channel television series Primeval: New World, a Canadian spin-off of the British sci-fi series Primeval. She played predator control expert Dylan Weir, a member of a dinosaur hunting team; the series was filmed in Vancouver. Canning also starred in 2012 with Aaron Ashmore in the dark romantic comedy, I Put a Hit on You. In 2013, she joined the cast of the psychological drama film, Eadweard, starring Michael Eklund. She played Flora, the wife of 19th-century photographer Eadweard Muybridge.

Canning played general surgeon Mel Conner in the Global medical drama, Remedy, co-starring Sarah Allen, Dillon Casey, and Enrico Colantoni. The television series was in production in Toronto from October 2013–January 2014. Broadcast company Shaw Media renewed the series for a second 10-episode season. Canning won the 2014 UBCP/ACTRA best actor and the 2015 Leo Award for Best Lead Performance for her role.

Canning co-starred in War for the Planet of the Apes (2017), a sequel to 2014's Dawn of the Planet of the Apes. She appeared in On the Farm, a Rachel Talalay-directed TV film about serial killer Robert Pickton, and in Hello Destroyer, which premiered at the 2016 Toronto International Film Festival. Canning played Jacquelyn Scieszka in the 2017 Netflix series A Series of Unfortunate Events, based on Daniel Handler's book series of the same. She also starred as the head of a boarding school, Ms. Brixil, in the dystopian thriller, Level 16, written and directed by Danishka Esterhazy. Canning collaborated with Esterhazy a third time in The Banana Splits Movie, a film shot in Cape Town, South Africa.

Canning was nominated for the 2020 UBCP/ACTRA award for best female lead performance for her work on the Web series Hospital Show.

She starred in the 2021 film Superhost and stated that she had hard time filming the YouTube vlogging scenes.

== Personal life ==
Canning relocated to Atlanta, Georgia to film The Vampire Diaries. She stated to Parade that she found that the Southern U.S. had "a much different culture than the west coast of Canada", but it became like her "second home". Canning lived in Atlanta for two years and returned to Vancouver, British Columbia after finishing the series.

== Filmography ==
=== Film ===
Year	Title	Role	Notes
2008	Slap Shot 3: The Junior League	Hope	Direct-to-video film
2009	Black Field	Maggie McGregor	
2013	The Right Kind of Wrong	Colette	
2014	I Put a Hit on You	Harper	
2015	Eadweard	Flora Shallcross Stone	
2016	Hello Destroyer	Wendy Davis	
2017	Prodigals	Jen	Stage play adaptation
2017	War for the Planet of the Apes	Lake	
2018	The Fish and the Sea	Real estate agent	
2018	Level 16	Miss Brixil	
2019	The Banana Splits Movie	Rebecca	
2020	An Awkward Balance	Venice	
2021	Superhost	Claire	
2022	Influencer	Jessica	
2023	Sweetland	Clara	
2023	The Burning Season	Alena	
2024	Dark Match	Kate the Great	
2025	Shaman	Candice	
2026	Mama’s Little Murderer	Constance	

=== Television ===
Year	Title	Role	Notes
2008	Paparazzi Princess: The Paris Hilton Story	Nicky Hilton	Television film
2008	Smallville	Tess' Assistant	Episodes: "Odyssey", "Plastique"
2009	Black Rain	Jenny	Television film
2009	Taken in Broad Daylight	Anne Sluti	Television film
2009	Kyle XY	Redhead	Episode: "In the Company of Men"
2009	Come Dance at My Wedding	Andrea Merriman	Television film
2009–2011, 2014, 2017	The Vampire Diaries	Jenna Sommers	Main role (seasons 1–2); guest role (seasons 3, 5 and 8); 46 episodes
2011	The Hunt for the I-5 Killer	Beth Williams	Television film
2012	Supernatural	Lydia	Episode: "The Slice Girls"
2012	Hannah's Law	Hannah Beaumont	Television film
2012	Halloween Wars	Herself	As a judge (season 2); episode: "Zombie Wedding"
2012–2013	Primeval: New World	Dylan Weir	Main role
2013	I Think I Do	Audrey Ryan	Television film
2013	King & Maxwell	Claire Culpepper	Episode: "Family Business"
2013	Garage Sale Mystery	Hannah	Television film
2013	Republic of Doyle	Jessica Dwyer	Episodes: "If the Shoe Fits", "Major Crimes"
2014–2015	Remedy	Dr. Melissa Conner	Main role
2014	Hell on Wheels	Charlotte Royce	3 episodes
2016	Motive	Tracy Blaine	Episode: "Interference"
2016	Unclaimed	Sinead McLeod	Television film
2017–2018	Lemony Snicket's A Series of Unfortunate Events	Jacquelyn Scieszka	Recurring role; 10 episodes
2018	Once Upon a Time	Gretel	Episode: "Sisterhood"
2018	Van Helsing	Carter	Episode: "Been Away"
2018	Take Two	Melissa	Episode: "It Takes a Thief"
2019	Wu Assassins	Alana	Episode: "Gu Assassins"
2019	Nancy Drew	Katherine Drew	Recurring role; 5 episodes
2019	Amish Abduction	Annie	Television film
2019	The Christmas Temp	Hazel	Television film
2019	Hospital Show	Charlie	Web series
2020	The Christmas Yule Blog	Caroline Williams	Television film
2021	Big Sky	Rachel Westergaard	Episodes: "The End Is Near", "Let It Be Him"
2021	9-1-1	Sheila	Episode: "Suspicion"
2021	A Christmas Star	Madeline	Television film
2023	The Irrational	D.A. Elise Bowen	Episode: "Pilot"
2023	Creepshow	Astrid	Episode: "The Hat"
2026	Virgin River	Victoria	Reacuring role, season 7
2026	Crew Girl	Imogen Regis	Season 1

== Awards and nominations ==
Year	Award	Category	Work	Result	Ref.
2012	Leo Award	Best Lead Performance by a Female in a Feature Length Drama	Hannah's Law	Nominated	
2014	UBCP/ACTRA Awards	Best Actress Award	Remedy	Won	
2015	Leo Award	Best Lead Performance by a Female in a Dramatic Series	Remedy	Won	
2015	Leo Award	Best Guest Performance by a Female in a Dramatic Series	Hell on Wheels	Nominated	
2015	UBCP/ACTRA Awards	Best Actress Award	Eadweard	Nominated	
2016	Leo Award	Best Lead Performance by a Female in a Dramatic Series	Remedy	Nominated	
2016	Leo Award	Best Supporting Performance by a Female in a Television Movie	On the Farm	Nominated	
2017	Leo Award	Best Guest Performance by a Female in a Dramatic Series	A Series of Unfortunate Events	Nominated	
