= Ghosting with Luke Hutchie and Matthew Finlan =

Canadian web series

- Genre: Parody; Paranormal; Comedy
- Created by: Luke Hutchie; Matthew Finlan
- Written by: Kik Di Nino; Andrew Hunt; Luke Hutchie; Matthew Finlan; Jonathan Jude
- Directed by: Nikki Chow; Mike Mildon
- Starring: Luke Hutchie; Matthew Finlan
- No. of seasons: 2
- No. of episodes: 16

Production
- Executive producers: Mark J.W. Bishop; Matthew Finlan; Zachary Frank; Jennifer Harkness; Matt Hornburg; Luke Hutchie; Donna Luke; Laura Michalchyshyn; Maureen Riley; Sam Sniderman
- Producer: Aileen Gardner
- Cinematography: Lester Millado; Elad Winkler
- Editors: Colin G. Cooper; Chris Dekoning; Michael Emberley; Stephen George; Krysia Szyszlo
- Production company: Blue Ant Studios

Original release
- Network: CBC Gem; Peacock
- Release: January 26, 2024 – present

Ghosting with Luke Hutchie and Matthew Finlan is a Canadian web series, which premiered in 2024 on CBC Gem. Cohosted by actors Luke Hutchie and Matthew Finlan, the series features the two accompanying celebrity guests to purportedly haunted locations, and attempt to investigate the reality of the paranormal.

Hutchie and Finlan are friends who previously costarred in Hutchie's horror comedy web series EZRA, and created the series based on a shared interest in horror. Finlan is the believer of the duo, while Hutchie is the skeptic.

Guests on the series have included Kevin Alves, Katie Douglas, Devyn Nekoda, Bukola Ayoka, Zoé De Grand Maison, Jade Hassouné, Frankie Grande and Synthia Kiss.

Produced by Blue Ant Media, the series premiered on January 26, 2024. In July 2024, the CBC announced that the series had been renewed for a second season.

In 2025, Playback named Hutchie as one of its annual "10 to Watch" roster of emerging Canadian film and television talents. In the same year, it was announced that the series will be added to the Peacock streaming platform in the United States.

== Cast ==
- Matthew Finlan
- Luke Hutchie

=== Celebrity guests ===
Season One

- Kevin Alves
- Bukola Ayoka
- Zoé De Grand Maison
- Katie Douglas
- Frankie Grande
- Hale Grande
- Jade Hassouné
- Synthia Kiss
- Devyn Nekoda

Season Two

- Jordan Connor
- Humberly González
- Percy Hynes White
- Krista Nazaire
- Joel Oulette
- Priyanka
- Nikki Roumel
- Veronika Slowikowska

== Episodes ==
=== Series overview ===
Season	Episodes	Originally released
1	8	January 26, 2024
2	8	March 21, 2025

=== Season 1 (2024) ===
No. overall	Title	Directed by	Written by	Original release date
1	"Case 101: The Merrill House"	Mike Mildon	Luke Hutchie, Jonathan Jude & Matthew Finlan	January 26, 2024
Bukola Ayoka steps off the script with Luke and Matthew as they explore the eerie Merrill House in Picton, Ontario.
2	"Case 102: The Olde Angel Inn"	Mike Mildon	Luke Hutchie & Kik Di Nino	January 26, 2024
Zoé De Grand Maison explores love and death with Luke and Matthew at The Olde Angel Inn in Niagara-on-the-Lake, Ontario.
3	"Case 103: Castle Kilbride"	Mike Mildon	Luke Hutchie & Kik Di Nino	January 26, 2024
Devyn Nekoda screams her way through Castle Kilbride with Luke and Matthew in Baden, Ontario as they discover its haunting past.
4	"Case 104: The SDG Jail"	Mike Mildon	Luke Hutchie & Jonathan Jude	January 26, 2024
Frankie and Hale Grande serve a sinister sentence at the infamous SDG Jail in Cornwall, Ontario with Luke and Matthew.
5	"Case 105: The McDonald Log Cabin"	Mike Mildon	Luke Hutchie & Kik Di Nino	January 26, 2024
Kevin Alves returns to the woods with Luke and Matthew as they explore the evil McDonald Log Cabin in Alliston, Ontario.
6	"Case 106: Auchmar Manor"	Mike Mildon	Luke Hutchie & Jonathan Jude	January 26, 2024
Katie Douglas joins Luke and Matthew as they investigate the sinister past of the Auchmar Manor in Hamilton, Ontario.
7	"Case 107: The Wellington County Poor House"	Mike Mildon	Luke Hutchie & Jonathan Jude	January 26, 2024
Jade Hassouné hunts shadows with Luke and Matthew at the Wellington County Poorhouse in Cornwall, Ontario.
8	"Case 108: The Orillia Opera House"	Mike Mildon	Luke Hutchie & Jonathan Jude	January 26, 2024
Synthia Kiss sashays her way through the legendary Orillia Opera House with Luke and Matthew in Orillia, Ontario.

=== Season 2 (2025) ===
No. overall	No. in season	Title	Directed by	Written by	Original release date
9	1	"Case 201: The Mansion"	Nikki Chow	Luke Hutchie, Andrew Hunt & Matthew Finlan	March 21, 2025
Canada's Drag Race Winner Priyanka joins Luke and Matthew as they investigate Tuckett Mansion in Hamilton, Ontario.
10	2	"Case 202: The Castle"	Nikki Chow	Luke Hutchie & Matthew Finlan	March 21, 2025
Wednesday's Percy Hynes White helps Luke and Matthew investigate the chilling Craigdarroch Castle in Victoria, B.C.
11	3	"Case 203: The Hotel"	Nikki Chow	Luke Hutchie & Matthew Finlan	March 21, 2025
Trickster's Joel Oulette joins Luke and Matthew as they investigate The Caribou Hotel in Carcross, Yukon Territory.
12	4	"Case 204: The Mine"	Nikki Chow	Luke Hutchie & Matthew Finlan	March 21, 2025
What We Do in the Shadows actress and internet sensation Veronika Slowikowska explores the creepy Bell Island Mines.
13	5	"Case 205: The School"	Nikki Chow	Luke Hutchie & Matthew Finlan	March 21, 2025
Ginny & Georgia's Nikki Roumel heads back to class with Luke and Matthew to investigate the spooky Lunenburg Academy.
14	6	"Case 206: The Séance House"	Nikki Chow	Luke Hutchie & Matthew Finlan	March 21, 2025
Tarot's Humberly González joins Luke and Matthew as they investigate the sinister Fulford Place in Brockville, Ontario.
15	7	"Case 207: The Fort"	Nikki Chow	Luke Hutchie & Matthew Finlan	March 21, 2025
Riverdale's Jordan Connor gangs up with Luke and Matthew to investigate the historic Fort Henry in Kingston, Ontario.
16	8	"Case 208: The Pioneer Village"	Nikki Chow	Luke Hutchie & Matthew Finlan	March 21, 2025
Krista Nazaire explores the hidden secrets of Kawartha Settlers Village with Luke and Matthew in Bobcaygeon, Ontario.
