= Kids in the House =

Parenting website

- Available in: English
- Owner: Leana Greene
- Website: www.kidsinthehouse.com
- Commercial: Yes
- Launched: 2013

Kids in the House is a website that provides advice and information on topics such as parenting, pregnancy, raising babies, toddlers, children, and teenagers. It features the biggest video library of expert advice for parents on the internet. The site contains over 8,000 videos from 450 experts, such as Daniel J. Siegel, Edward Hallowell, John Gray, and Arianna Huffington.

== History ==
Kids in the House is a video library of parenting and parenting advice videos, which was launched in 2013. She has stated that she decided to start building the library in order to democratize the availability of parenting advice across the US. She has also stated that advice for non-traditional family types are an important part of the library. The archive is the largest compendium of parenting advice videos available online. The videos are produced by Kids in the House founder Leana Greene, who shot each of the eight thousand or so videos in her Los Angeles production studio.

In 2013 Kids in the House produced a video with advice from Pattie Mallette, the mother of singer Justin Bieber, who provided advice on raising a child who becomes a successful entertainer at a young age. In 2014 the company produced a video with advice from dancer and model Brooke Burke-Charvet on shedding the weight gained during pregnancy. In 2015 Ali Landry appeared in a video on spending Valentine's Day together as a family. The site has also produced videos for children themselves, and in 2014 the organization launched an anti-bullying campaign, including awareness videos that mentioned bullying statistics and anecdotes.

== Reception ==
As of May 2014 the site housed videos featuring about 450 different parenting consultants, public personalities such as film or television actors/actresses, and regular parents. NBC News described the video collection, writing that, “From advice on picky eaters, to guidance on managing parental stress, and information on maternity leave, Kids in the House has parents covered from the first steps of family planning all the way to getting the kids off to college.”

== See also ==
- BabyZone.com
