= Blankfield =

Blankfield is a surname. Notable people with the surname include:

- Mark Blankfield (born 1950), American comedic actor
- Peter Wolf (born Peter Walter Blankfield; 1946), American musician
- Joanne Blankfield, who played Judith in the opera Batavia

== See also ==
- Blackfield (disambiguation)
