= Reacher season 2 =

Reacher
- Season 2
- Promotional poster
- Showrunner: Nick Santora
- Starring: Alan Ritchson; Maria Sten; Serinda Swan; Shaun Sipos; Ferdinand Kingsley; Robert Patrick
- No. of episodes: 8

Release
- Original network: Amazon Prime Video
- Original release: December 15, 2023 – January 19, 2024

Season chronology
- ← Previous; Season 1 Next → Season 3

The second season of the American action crime television series Reacher, based on the Jack Reacher book series by Lee Child, premiered on Amazon Prime Video on December 15, 2023.

The season, based on Bad Luck and Trouble (2007), stars Alan Ritchson, Maria Sten, Serinda Swan, Shaun Sipos, Ferdinand Kingsley, and Robert Patrick. In the season, Reacher reunites with his former unit to discover who is killing their members and stop an illegal arms trafficking operation between an aeronautical company and a terrorist arms broker.

On December 2, 2023, ahead of the second-season premiere, it was revealed that filming of a third season had begun.

== Episodes ==
No. overall	No. in season	Title	Directed by	Written by	Original release date
9	1	"ATM"	Sam Hill	Nick Santora	December 15, 2023
In the Catskill Mountains, a man falls out of a helicopter to his death. The next day, Jack Reacher collects his pension check in Arkansas after stopping an armed carjacker and discovers a military emergency code hidden in his ATM receipt. He contacts former teammate Frances Neagley, who confirms she planted it to reach him. The victim is revealed to be Calvin Franz, a former member of Reacher's Special Investigations Unit. In New York, Reacher, Neagley, and David O'Donnell investigate the murder. Reacher recovers a hidden data drive left by Franz containing a list of numbers and another of names beginning with the initials A.M., believed to be aliases. The three vow to find and punish Franz's killers. They go to the home of another teammate, Tony Swan, but only find his dog dead from dehydration. Realizing Franz has been murdered and Swan is missing, Reacher concludes that someone is targeting the remaining living members of his former unit.
10	2	"What Happens in Atlantic City"	Sam Hill	Scott Sullivan	December 15, 2023
Reacher assaults a stranger following him, only to then identify him as NYPD Detective Guy Russo. Reacher, Neagley, and O'Donnell visit Atlantic City, where two teammates (Sanchez and Orozco) worked as security guards for the Neptune Casino. Along the way, they meet Karla Dixon, another member of the team and potential love interest for Reacher. They find a helpful ally in David Wright, the casino's Chief of Security. He comps the team a suite to stay in and helps them search for Sanchez and Orozco. Unfortunately, his police contacts confirm that both men were abducted, murdered, and dumped in the same region of the mountains as Franz. He confirms that none of the casinos are missing money, so the numbers on the list must mean something else. A later assassination attempt points them back to New York and a defense contracting company called New Age Technologies.
11	3	"Picture Says a Thousand Words"	Omar Madha	Penny Cox	December 15, 2023
Flashbacks reveal New Age security chief Shane Langston torturing Franz for information before throwing him from a helicopter, with Franz warning that the "big guy" is coming for him. In the present, Reacher obtains weapons for his team before he and O'Donnell are arrested by Russo. Russo reveals that his investigation has identified Azari Mahmoud, known as A.M., a wanted terrorist broker, as a suspect in the murders. Meanwhile, Neagley and Dixon visit New Age Technologies, where Marlo Burns identifies the man sent to kill them as Trevor Saropian and gives them his address. A.M. learns that his aliases have been exposed and delays his arrival in New York, while Dixon discovers that the figures on Franz's USB represent dates. Reacher, Neagley, Dixon, and O'Donnell go to Saropian's house, anticipate an ambush, and kill the mercenaries waiting for them. With New Age's involvement confirmed, they raid the company's headquarters and find evidence that Swan had worked there.
12	4	"A Night at the Symphony"	Omar Madha	Cait Duffy	December 22, 2023
As the team members investigate their discoveries from New Age, they disagree on Swan's motives after discovering he works in the company's security department. They find out New Age has a government defense contract called Little Wing, thanks to notes from a senator named Malcolm Lavoy. Back in Denver, A.M. kills a plastic surgeon to steal his identity before flying to New York. The team tracks the senator's legislative aide to Boston, where Reacher's old ally, Oscar Finlay, arrests the aide to coerce information out of him. The aide reveals that Little Wing is a surface-to-air missile program conducted in New Age facilities in Denver and New York to create missiles that always hit their targets. Reacher realizes that people from New Age are planning to sell 650 missiles to A.M. to enable terrorist attacks. A biker gang ambushes the team but they kill them. Reacher calls Langston, who hired the gang to take them out, and declares he will kill Langston.
13	5	"Burial"	Carol Banker	Scott Sullivan	December 29, 2023
Neagley and Dixon travel to New Age's Denver facility hoping to inspect the missiles, but discover they have already been transported. A.M.'s men intercept the shipment by switching trailers and escape with the missiles. Documents from the facility reveal that Swan authorized the missiles to leave New Age. Reacher and O'Donnell visit the Department of Homeland Security in Washington, D.C., seeking information on A.M., where Senator Lavoy offers his support. The team then returns to New York for Franz's funeral. There, Russo reveals that Langston and the New Age security team, except Swan, are former NYPD officers from the same precinct. Two hitmen attack the team. Neagley kills one, while Reacher and Russo capture the other. The assassin claims Swan hired him to kill the team, but when he goes to collect his payment while the team watches, hidden, the building explodes.
14	6	"New York's Finest"	Carol Banker	Cait Duffy & Michael J. Gutierrez	January 5, 2024
Russo helps the team track down Marlo Burns. She confirms that Swan had been trying to stop New Age's terrorist operation and is on the run thanks to Langston, who is going to kill her and her daughter Jane because she helped Swan. Russo learns that New Age contacted his boss, who is involved with them; Langston bribed him into revealing updates on Russo's investigation. New Age hitmen try to kill Russo and Jane in a chase across the city, forcing Russo to call the team for backup. The team enlists Marlo as bait to lure Langston into a trap; Reacher kills the New Age team but Langston escapes in a helicopter. The rest of the team arrives to help Russo but Russo has sacrificed himself to save Jane and kill the hitmen.
15	7	"The Man Goes Through"	Julian Holmes	Penny Cox & Lillian Wang	January 12, 2024
The team sends Marlo and Jane to a safe place. Reacher and Neagley confront Russo's boss, Lieutenant Drew Marsh, who gave Langston information, knowing Russo would die. Reacher kills Marsh after he reveals that Grant, one of the hitmen hired to kill Russo, is alive in a hospital. Reacher and Neagley extract information regarding the buy from Grant. Reacher then ensures that Grant dies from an embolism as vengeance for killing Russo. Langston reveals to Reacher that he has Dixon and O'Donnell. Reacher lies to Langston that Neagley was killed so that he goes in alone. Reacher requests Lavoy's private security team for his mission. Leaving Neagley outside to wait for Lavoy's team, Reacher walks into New Age Facility alone and surrenders.
16	8	"Fly Boy"	Julian Holmes	Scott Sullivan	January 19, 2024
Reacher is disheartened to learn Langston killed Swan after Swan refused to join his conspiracy, and used Swan's eye and fingerprint to frame him. Neagley and Lavoy's security team ambush the facility, allowing Reacher to board Langston's helicopter. Reacher throws Langston from the helicopter, avenging his fallen team members. The team then ambushes and kills A.M. at a New Age engineer's house. Having anticipated that Lavoy's security team would eliminate them to keep Lavoy's hands clean of his involvement, Reacher had already alerted the Department of Homeland Security, which arrests Lavoy and his team for his part in the missile plan. In the end, the team divides the $65 million they took from the missile sale among themselves and the families of their deceased teammates before going their separate ways.

== Cast and characters ==
=== Main ===
- Alan Ritchson as Jack Reacher, a member of the U.S. Army 110th MP Special Investigations Unit and a former major
- Maria Sten as Frances Neagley, a former Master Sergeant and member of the U.S. Army 110th MP Special Investigations Unit
- Serinda Swan as Karla Dixon, a former major and member of the U.S. Army 110th MP Special Investigations Unit
- Shaun Sipos as David O'Donnell, a member of the U.S. Army 110th MP Special Investigations Unit
- Ferdinand Kingsley as A.M., a dangerous and ruthless terrorist broker
- Robert Patrick as Shane Langston, New Age's Director of Security and a former corrupt NYPD detective

=== Recurring ===
- Domenick Lombardozzi as Gaitano "Guy" Russo, a NYPD detective
- Andres Collantes as Jorge Sanchez, a former U.S. Army Major and member of the 110th Special Investigation Unit
- Edsson Morales as Manuel Orozco, a former U.S. Army Major and member of the 110th Special Investigation Unit
- Luke Bilyk as Calvin Franz, a former U.S. Army Major and member of the 110th Special Investigation Unit
- Shannon Kook as Tony Swan, a former U.S. Army Major and member of the 110th Special Investigation Unit and New Age Assistant Director of Security
- Josh Blacker as Lieutenant Colonel Hortense Fields, commanding officer of the 110th Unit

=== Guest ===
- Joris Jarsky as Trevor Saropian, a hitman working for Langston
- Dean McKenzie as Stanley "Stan" Lowrey
- Téa Helena Carini as Angela Franz, Calvin's wife
- Arlen Aguayo-Stewart as Milena, Sanchez's girlfriend
- Lochlyn Munro as David Wright, Head of Security
- Gavin Fox as Lennox, Langston's henchman
- David MacInnis as Parker, Langston's henchman
- Christina Cox as Marlo Burns, New Age's Director of Operations
- Malcolm Goodwin as Oscar Finlay, a Boston police detective and ally of Reacher
- Al Sapienza as Drew Marsh, the corrupt NYPD lieutenant and Russo's supervisor
- Kyle Mac as Daniel Boyd, Malcolm Lavoy's legislative director
- Noam Jenkins as Malcolm Lavoy, a prominent U.S. senator
- Sean Baek as Oleg, A.M's henchman
- Sprague Grayden as Seaver, a special agent working for Malcolm Lavoy
- Kate Moyer as Jane Burns, Marlo's daughter
- Cory Bertrand as Chad
- Jonathan Higgins as Russell Johnson, a corrupt New Age engineer
- Mishka Thébaud as Grant, a former NYPD corrupt cop, on Langston's payroll
- Ray Galletti as Pierce

== Production ==
=== Development ===
On February 7, 2022, Amazon Prime Video renewed the series for a second season.

=== Casting ===
On September 14, 2022, Shaun Sipos joined as a series regular for the second season. On September 21, 2022, Serinda Swan, Ferdinand Kingsley, and Rory Cochrane joined the main cast while Domenick Lombardozzi, Luke Bilyk, Dean McKenzie, Edsson Morales, Andres Collantes, Shannon Kook, Ty Olsson, Josh Blacker, and Al Sapienza were cast in guest roles for the second season. Goodwin, Swan and Lombardozzi already starred in Santora's Breakout Kings in 2011. On May 5, 2023, Robert Patrick was cast to replace Cochrane who left due to a scheduling conflict with the second season.

=== Filming ===
Filming for the second season took place between September 2022 and March 2023. The season was filmed in various locations in Ontario, Canada, including Toronto, Brampton, Mississauga, and Hamilton.

== Release ==
The first three episodes of the season were released on December 15, 2023, with an additional episode released each week through January 19, 2024.

== Reception ==
The second season has a 98% approval rating on Rotten Tomatoes, based on 44 critic reviews, with an average rating of 7.9/10. The website's critics consensus states, "Brawny as Alan Ritchson's biceps, Reacher swaggers confidently into its sophomore season as rock 'em sock 'em pulp with a sly wink."Metacritic, which uses a weighted average, assigned a score of 79 out of 100 based on 14 critics, indicating "generally favorable reviews".

Conversely, Forbes panned the second season as "one of the worst shows on TV", adding that "there's just not enough going on to make him (Reacher) a particularly compelling protagonist".
