= Reacher season 1 =

Reacher
- Season 1
- Promotional poster
- Showrunner: Nick Santora
- Starring: Alan Ritchson; Malcolm Goodwin; Willa Fitzgerald; Chris Webster; Bruce McGill; Maria Sten
- No. of episodes: 8

Release
- Original network: Amazon Prime Video
- Original release: February 4, 2022

Season chronology
- Next → Season 2

The first season of the American action crime television series Reacher, based on the Jack Reacher book series by Lee Child, premiered on Amazon Prime Video on February 4, 2022.

The season, based on Killing Floor, stars Alan Ritchson, Malcolm Goodwin, Willa Fitzgerald, Chris Webster, Bruce McGill, and Maria Sten. In the season, Reacher investigates, alongside police officers Oscar Finlay and Roscoe Conklin, a local conspiracy while also trying to uncover his brother's murderer.

On February 7, 2022, Amazon Prime Video renewed the series for a second season.

== Episodes ==
No. overall	No. in season	Title	Directed by	Written by	Original release date
1	1	"Welcome to Margrave"	Thomas Vincent	Nick Santora	February 4, 2022
At midnight, a man is shot dead outside Margrave, Georgia. The following morning, Jack Reacher arrives in town, hoping to learn about blues musician Blind Blake, and is arrested for the murder. Questioned by Detective Oscar Finlay, Reacher deduces that multiple experienced killers are responsible. Finlay tracks down the phone number of banker Paul Hubble, whose phone number was in the dead man's shoe. Seeing a conspicuous car outside his house, Hubble falsely confesses to the murder. Spivey, a crooked guard, places them with the general population instead of protective custody, and Reacher brutally foils an attempt on their lives. Hubble explains he confessed to cover for a criminal organization that would have otherwise killed him and his family. After their release, Reacher is aided by sympathetic Officer Roscoe Conklin, and is threatened by KJ Kliner, the son of powerful local businessman Kliner Sr. A second body is found near the first victim, who Reacher identifies as his older brother, Joe Reacher.
2	2	"First Dance"	Sam Hill	Scott Sullivan	February 4, 2022
Determined to help Finlay and Roscoe solve his brother's murder, Reacher speaks with Hubble's wife, Charlie, and realizes that Hubble, who has gone missing, was the target of the prison hit, not himself. Police Chief Ed Morrison and his wife are gruesomely murdered, and Reacher concludes Morrison was in the pocket of the mysterious organization, as is Mayor Grover Teale, who appoints himself the new Chief of Police. Finlay is ordered to conduct a sham investigation into Morrison's death, but convinces his friend, FBI agent Picard, to take Charlie and her children into unofficial protective custody. Reacher sets a meeting with Spivey but is ambushed by South American mercenaries, from whom he escapes. Roscoe continues to bond with Reacher, dancing together at a bar, and flooded roads force them to share a motel room, where Reacher opens up about his past. They return to find her home has been broken into, with a threat carved in her door.
3	3	"Spoonful"	Stephen Surjik	Aadrita Mukerji	February 4, 2022
At Reacher's urging, Roscoe gives him a gun. They are contacted by Molly Beth Gordon, Joe's colleague at the Secret Service Office of Investigations, who reveals that Joe was in Margrave on a confidential assignment investigating large-scale counterfeiting. Reacher intimidates one of Kliner's lawyers for information on Pete Jobling, the second victim, a truck driver Kliner had released from police custody. Mistaken for a burglar while searching Spivey's house, Finlay is beaten by police and briefly arrested, but connects Spivey to Kliner Industries. Reacher and Finlay question Kliner himself, who threatens them to drop their investigation, and Reacher urges Roscoe and Finlay to lay low. Roscoe is menaced by KJ, who warns her that Reacher is a murderer, while Finlay discovers that Hubble left his job in cash management over a year ago. Tailed by the mercenaries, Reacher kills them and finds Spivey's corpse in their trunk.
4	4	"In a Tree"	Christine Moore	Cait Duffy	February 4, 2022
Finding Joe's burned car, Reacher tells Roscoe the truth behind KJ's warning: while serving in Iraq, Reacher killed three civilian men for sexually assaulting young boys. Disposing of the mercenaries, Reacher pays for a hotel room using their counterfeit cash, where he and Roscoe have sex after she surprises him in the shower. They visit Jobling's widow, who believed he was killed for stealing from Kliner Industries, with empty boxes Reacher suspects were used to move the counterfeit cash from South America. Teale warns Finlay to leave Kliner alone, and Picard traces Joe's car to a motel, where Reacher and Roscoe find a hidden note before they are attacked by more mercenaries. Roscoe saves Reacher, who admits he put himself in danger to protect her, and reaches out to an old Army buddy for help. Molly Beth arrives in Atlanta with Joe's files, but she is killed and the files are stolen seconds before Reacher finds her.
5	5	"No Apologies"	Norberto Barba	Scott Sullivan	February 4, 2022
Reacher finds and attacks KJ for vandalizing Roscoe's truck. Teale fires Roscoe for "subpar" police work, finding minor errors in previous investigations as cause. Reacher finds a collection of research left for Roscoe by her deceased mentor Gray, confirming Margrave is the heart of Kliner's counterfeiting operation. Reacher meets with his old comrade, private investigator Frances Neagley, and they connect Kliner Industries to the death of an EPA agent who discovered the company was dumping chemical waste. With the help of a pair of police officers, they learn a hitman known as "the Viking" may have killed the agent. Threatened by Kliner's South American associates, one of the officers shoots his partner and attempts to kill Reacher and Neagley. The two then break the barrier between the front and back seats, sending them careening into a river, where the now stuck officer accepts his fate while Neagley and Reacher survive. Roscoe punches Teale after realizing that he murdered Gray, and Finlay sends her to replace Picard as the Hubble family's bodyguard. Later that night Finlay breaks into Kliner's office only to find him brutally murdered.
6	6	"Papier"	Omar Madha	Aadrita Mukerji	February 4, 2022
Reacher concludes that Kliner was killed by his Venezuelan partners, who sent mercenaries to Picard's safe house in the woods. Roscoe kills the hitmen and escapes with Charlie and her daughters, and Charlie reveals her husband's involvement with Kliner, who tricked Hubble into laundering money and forced him to watch a man be crucified and castrated to ensure his loyalty. As he and Reacher follow one of Kliner's trucks, Finlay reveals that he came to Margrave not after a divorce but because his wife died after a long illness, and they find the truck empty. Reacher learns one of Joe's contacts was murdered and visits another, Professor Kate Castillo in New York City, who explains that Joe was tracing superbills manufactured in Georgia, and Reacher realizes Kliner was printing counterfeit bills in Margrave and shipping them to Venezuela. Placing Castillo under police protection, Reacher confronts another assassin and strangles him with his necktie.
7	7	"Reacher Said Nothing"	Lin Oeding	Scott Sullivan	February 4, 2022
The Venezuelans brutally interrogate Paul's cousin, Officer Stevenson, and his pregnant wife about the Hubbles' whereabouts before killing them, and Teale fires Finlay. Reacher pretends to confide in Margrave's remaining policeman, Officer Baker, whom he suspects is working for the Kliners. Tipped off by Baker, Kliner's nephew Dawson leads a Venezuelan hit squad to the Hubble's house to ambush Reacher, who is lying in wait and kills them all. Reacher realizes Kliner Industries is bleaching large amounts of $1 bills secured by Hubble, using animal feed to hide the chemical waste involved, and reprinting them as pre-1990s $100 bills to ship to Venezuela. Finlay personally informs Stevenson's parents of his death, and later that night Reacher helps Finlay evade mercenaries who track him to his motel. Jobling's widow's home has been burned down, but Joe's note leads Reacher and Finlay to boxes of incriminating bills Jobling hid in his parents' garage. Returning to Margrave, they arrange a meeting with Picard, but when Reacher arrives it is revealed that Picard was in on the scheme along with Teale and KJ.
8	8	"Pie"	MJ Bassett	Nick Santora	February 4, 2022
Roscoe, Hubble's family, and Finlay are taken hostage. KJ confesses to multiple murders, including his father's, reveals that he killed Joe, and sends Reacher to find Hubble accompanied by Picard. Reacher subdues and escapes from Picard, locates Hubble, and later rescues Finlay by crashing into the police station and killing Baker. Reacher, Finlay, Neagley, and Hubble arm themselves with weapons from the station and launch an assault on KJ's warehouse. They set the building on fire and kill the mercenaries, while Hubble rescues his daughters. Reacher frees Roscoe and Charlie, who escape together. Picard and Teale arrive but are killed by Finlay and Roscoe. Reacher kills KJ by throwing him into burning chemicals, avenging Joe's death. Reacher remembers visiting his dying mother with Joe, who gave him his grandfather's Croix de Guerre. After burying the medal where Joe died, Roscoe and Reacher share a farewell kiss, Finlay returns to Boston, and Reacher leaves Margrave to continue his journey alone.

== Cast and characters ==
=== Main ===
- Alan Ritchson as Jack Reacher
  - Maxwell Jenkins as young Jack Reacher
- Malcolm Goodwin as Oscar Finlay, Chief Detective, Margrave PD
- Willa Fitzgerald as Roscoe Conklin, Margrave PD officer
- Chris Webster as KJ Kliner, the ruthless son of Kliner Sr.
- Bruce McGill as Mayor Grover Teale
- Maria Sten as Frances Neagley

=== Recurring ===
- Willie C. Carpenter as Mosley
- Harvey Guillén as Jasper
- Christopher Russell as Joe Reacher, Jack Reacher's brother
  - Gavin White as young Joe Reacher
- Leslie Fray as Josephine Reacher, Jack and Joe's mother
- Matthew Marsden as Stan Reacher
- Hugh Thompson as Officer Baker, a corrupt Margrave police officer
- Jonathan Koensgen as Officer Stevenson
- AJ Simmons as Dawson Kliner, KJ's cousin and Kliner Sr.'s nephew
- Marc Bendavid as Paul Hubble
- Patrick Garrow as Spivey, a corrupt correctional officer
- Kristin Kreuk as Charlene "Charlie" Hubble, Paul's wife
- Currie Graham as Kliner Sr.
- Martin Roach as Picard

=== Guest ===
- Peter Skagen as Edward "Ed" Morrison
- Lara Jean Chorostecki as Molly Beth Gordon
- Paulino Nunes as Zacarias Perez
- Claire Armstrong as Debbie Shane
- Janelle Cooper as Barbara
- Nancy Palk as Mrs. Jobling
- Ali Johnson as Judy Miller
- Mathieu Simard as Emmitt
- Mika Amonsen as Officer Ribidoux
- Shane Marriott as Aucoin
- Philip Williams as Rufus
- Dylan Trowbridge as Dale
- Alex Castillo as Professor Castillo
- Jorja Cadence as Emma Stevenson

== Production ==
=== Development ===
On July 15, 2019, a TV series adaptation of Lee Child's Jack Reacher novels was announced by Amazon. Nick Santora, who created Scorpion, was set to write, showrun, and produce the series through Paramount Television and Skydance Media. On January 14, 2020, the TV series was greenlit, with Don Granger, Scott Sullivan, David Ellison, Dana Goldberg, Marcy Ross, and Christopher McQuarrie as executive producers with Child. The first season was announced as an adaptation of Child's novel Killing Floor. In July 2021, it was announced M. J. Bassett had joined the series as a director. To adapt the books to screen the writers decided they would need to make Reacher verbalize his thoughts more often, but that they would keep his dialogue short and direct and have him only speak longer to people he respects. They also decided to introduce Neagley to the series earlier than in the books.

=== Casting ===
On September 4, 2020, Alan Ritchson was cast in the title role. On March 22, 2021, Malcolm Goodwin, Willa Fitzgerald, and Chris Webster were cast as series regulars. On May 19, 2021, Bruce McGill, Maria Sten, and Hugh Thompson joined the main cast. On June 11, 2021, Kristin Kreuk, Marc Bendavid, Willie C. Carpenter, Currie Graham, Harvey Guillén, and Maxwell Jenkins were announced to have joined the cast in undisclosed capacities.

=== Filming ===
A temporary townscape was built in North Pickering, Ontario to support filming of the season. The entire fictional city of Margrave was built from the ground up in a leased farm field in Ontario. Other areas of filming include Toronto, Port Perry and Pickering. Principal photography of the season took place between April 15 and July 30, 2021, in Toronto. During filming, Ritchson broke a bone in his shoulder, which required surgery. He also tore an abdominal muscle during a fight scene.

== Release ==
The season's episodes were released on February 4, 2022.

== Reception ==
The review aggregator website Rotten Tomatoes reported a 92% approval rating with an average rating of 7.3/10, based on 75 critic reviews. The website's critics consensus reads, "Reacher captures the trademark bulk of its titular hero while trading away some of his definition, but fans of the novels will find plenty to love about this faithful adaptation." Metacritic, which uses a weighted average, assigned a score of 68 out of 100 based on 18 critics, indicating "generally favorable reviews".

Lucy Mangan of The Guardian said, "This rollicking adaptation of Lee Child's man-mountain ex-military sleuth is hugely fun, packed with punchups and far better than Cruise's movie efforts." Michael Hogan of The Telegraph wrote, "Reacher is huge, pulpy fun and far classier than you might expect." Joshua Alston of Variety praised the casting of Ritchson but said the character was unsuitable to carry this kind of show: "the longer it runs, the more obvious its protagonist-shaped void becomes". Dan Fienberg of The Hollywood Reporter called it "frustratingly over-faithful to the source material", saying, "I wouldn't mind another season, but I'd probably still rather read another book."
