= Matthew Finlan =

Canadian actor

- Born: 1994 or 1995 (age 31–32); Peterborough, Ontario, Canada
- Occupation: Actor
- Years active: 2018–present

Matthew Finlan (born 1994 or 1995) is a Canadian actor. He cohosts the CBC Gem webseries Ghosting with Luke Hutchie and Matthew Finlan and is known for Orphan: First Kill, All the Lost Ones, and Heated Rivalry.

== Early life and education ==
Finlan was born and raised in Peterborough, Ontario. Finlan began acting in community theatre as a child, including playing one of the Von Trapp family in The Sound of Music. He went on to take the integrated arts program at Peterborough Collegiate, formerly Peterborough Collegiate Vocational School, and he graduated from George Brown Theatre School.

== Career ==
Finlan's first major acting role was playing Gunnar Albright in the 2022 film Orphan: First Kill, alongside Isabelle Fuhrman, Julia Stiles, and Rossif Sutherland. He had several previous television guest roles, including Murdoch Mysteries on CBC and Grand Army on Netflix. He went on to play supporting roles in the OutTV series Ezra and the 2024 film All the Lost Ones.

In 2024, he produced and cohosted the webseries Ghosting with Luke Hutchie and Matthew Finlan. His brother Daniel Finlan, better known by his stage name as drag queen Synthia Kiss, appeared in one episode. The show was nominated for several awards, including the Canadian Screen Awards for best direction, the Blood in the Snow Canadian Film Festival award for best digital series, and won the American Reality Television Award for best international reality series.

In 2025, Finlan had recurring roles in CBS series Sheriff Country and Crave original Heated Rivalry. As of September 18, 2026, It has not yet been announced whether he would be reprising his role in season 2 as Kyle Swift, who is the lead of one of the books in the Game Changers series.

== Personal life ==
Finlan is dating drag queen Aurora Matrix, known for their performance on season four of Canada's Drag Race and winning Canada's Drag Race All Stars.

== Filmography ==
=== Film ===
Year	Title	Role	Notes
2018	Tiny House	Brandon	Short
2022	Brazen	Jerald Baxter	Credited as Matthew Aaron Finlan
2022	My Fake Boyfriend	Leo	
2022	Orphan: First Kill	Gunnar Albright	
2023	Hell of a Summer	Ezra	
2024	All the Lost Ones	Jacob	

=== Television ===
Year	Title	Role	Ref.
2019	The Terror	MP Mosley	Episode: "Gaman"
2019	Frankie Drake Mysteries	Bart	2 episodes
2020	October Faction	Nate	Episode: "Presidio"
2020	Hey Lady!	Barista	Episode #1.3
2020	Workin' Moms	Shitty Boy #1	Episode: "No One's Coming"
2020	Grand Army	All-American Bro	2 episodes
2021	Murdoch Mysteries	Charlie Chaplin	Episode: "Murdoch and the Tramp"
2021	Nurses	Young Resident	Episode: "Struck"
2021	Jingle Bell Princess	Marcel	TV movie
2022	Ezra	Cade Walton	5 episodes
2024-2025	Ghosting with Luke Hutchie and Matthew Finlan	Himself	Host, co-creator, and writer
2025	Heated Rivalry	Kyle Swift	2 episodes
2025–2026	Sheriff Country	Rick Fraley	5 episodes
2026	Hudson & Rex	Vincent Noseworthy	Episode: "Murder Al Fesco"
2026	Neagley	Doyle	Episode: "Hammer Time"
