= Hannah's Law =

2012 TV film

- Written by: John Fasano
- Directed by: Rachel Talalay
- Countries of origin: United States; Canada
- Original language: English

Production
- Producers: John Fasano; Michael Ogiens; Michael Frislev; Chad Oakes; Jay Daniel Beechinor; Petros Danabassis
- Running time: 88 minutes

Original release
- Network: Hallmark Movie Channel
- Release: June 9, 2012

Hannah's Law is a 2012 American/Canadian Western television film from the Hallmark Movie Channel. The movie stars Cameron Bancroft, Sara Canning, John Pyper-Ferguson, and Julian Black Antelope.

== Synopsis ==
The film is centered on the character Hannah Beaumont. The film begins in 1866 in Abilene, Texas. The opening scene shows Hannah's parents and young brother being killed by the McMurphy gang. Later in the film, Hannah is a grown woman and a bounty hunter. She has taken an interest in finding the McMurphy gang members who brutally murdered her family. Unlike her fellow bounty hunter competitors, Hannah likes to bring the people she captures alive so they can face justice. She eventually faces the McMurphy gang and learns her brother is actually alive.

== Cast ==
- Cameron Bancroft as James Beaumont
- Julian Black Antelope as Redwing
- Sara Canning as Hannah Beaumont
- John Pyper-Ferguson as Frank McMurphy
- Tom Carey as Hacker
- Diego Diablo Del Mar as Pineda
- Kimberly Elise as Mary "Stagecoach Mary"
- John Fasano as Marshal Deger
- Brendan Fletcher as Zechariah Stitch
- Danny Glover as Isom Dart
- Lucy Harvey as Elizabeth
- Greyston Holt as Wyatt Earp
- Brendan Hunter as Loring Stewart
- Chris Ippolito as Drunk Cowboy
- Ryan Kennedy as John "Doc" Holliday
- Ian Kilburn as "Turk" Anderson
- Billy Zane as Lockwood

== Reception ==
Neil Genzlinger of The New York Times called it "a tasty western tale" with no mailed-in performances. Laura Fries of Variety wrote, "A clear attempt at an action-romance Western, the resulting pic is more like Fifty Shades of Dust."
