= Jordan Connor =

Canadian actor (born 1991)

- Born: Jordan Connor Yuen; 17 September 1991 (age 34); Calgary, Alberta, Canada
- Occupation: Actor
- Spouse: Jinjara Mitchell (m. 2021)

Jordan Connor Yuen (born 17 September 1991) is a Canadian actor. He plays Sweet Pea in the television series Riverdale. He has also appeared in Looking for Alaska, Hospital Show and Nurses.

== Early life ==
Connor was born in Calgary but moved to Vancouver when he was two years old. He grew up in Delta, located in the Greater Vancouver area. Connor's father was born in Canada and is mostly of Chinese descent. His mother is from Croatia. He has a brother, Brad, and a sister, Nicole.

Connor said he knew he wanted to be an actor since he was around 10–11 years old. Connor attended Sands Secondary School, where he did theatre and played football. His first performance was in his school's production of Guys and Dolls. After receiving a football scholarship to the University of British Columbia, Connor put acting aside to focus on football while he was studying architecture. During a game at the end of his second year, Connor broke his leg when he was tackled, ending his football career. Bedridden and unable to walk for three months, Connor became depressed. After his leg healed, Connor found work as a stuntperson when the show Hellcats came to his football team seeking stuntpeople. Rediscovering his love for acting on the set, Connor continued doing stunt and background work for about a year.

Eventually, Connor left university to pursue acting more seriously. He began acting training at the Railtown Actors Studio in Vancouver. While training on and off for five years, Connor booked small parts and also worked in other jobs, including bartending at a restaurant, working for a marketing company and selling mobile phones. He also owned a theatre company with friends.

== Career ==
Connor's breakthrough role was as Sweet Pea in the television series Riverdale. Connor had auditioned for other characters such as Joaquin and Reggie before reading for Sweet Pea. First introduced in the show's second season (which premiered in October 2017), Connor was originally supposed to only have four episodes but his role was later expanded to a recurring role.

In March 2019, Connor was cast as Kevin in Looking for Alaska, a miniseries adaptation of John Green's novel. The series was released on Hulu on 18 October 2019. In 2019, Connor appeared in Hospital Show, a 10-part comedy web series which premiered on YouTube on 10 October 2019. In April 2020, Connor was one of the celebrity contestants in the first episode of RuPaul's Secret Celebrity Drag Race. Competing against Jermaine Fowler and Nico Tortorella, Connor won the episode, winning $30,000 for his charity of choice, Cystic Fibrosis Canada.

In August 2020, it was announced that Connor had joined the cast of Canadian medical drama series Nurses for its second season. He co-directed a short film with Derek Wallis titled The Skimmer. He was also a producer and actor in the short. Connor also produced The Ornament, a short film written and directed by his wife Jinjara Mitchell which premiered in July 2024. In 2025, he was the guest on an episode of the paranormal web series Ghosting with Luke Hutchie and Matthew Finlan.

In August 2026, it was reported that Connor would be a producer on The Jam Van, a road trip dramedy film.

== Personal life ==
Connor and his long-term partner, Jinjara Mitchell, got engaged on 22 September 2018. They got married on 4 September 2021.

== Filmography ==
=== Films ===
Year	Title	Role	Notes	Ref.
2013	Fighting Free	Adam	Short film	
2013	Never Gonna Let You		Short film	
2013	Destroyer	Hockey Player	Short film	
2014	What an Idiot	Office Guy		
2014	The Cover-Up	Drunk Party Guy		
2016	Plan B	Louis	Short film	
2023	The Skimmer	Jamie Osprey	Short film, also co-director and producer	
2024	The Ornament		Short film, producer	
2025	Little Booms	Troy	Short film	

=== Television ===
Year	Title	Role	Notes	Ref.
2013	Supernatural	Demon Sam	Episode: "The Great Escapist"	
2013	The Tomorrow People	David	Episode: "Limbo"	
2014	Ivy Tower	Ricky Brigola	Episodes: "Birthday Paradox" and "Grinning Nurses"	
2015	Backstrom	Stan Park	Episode: "Takes One to Know One"	
2016	Lucifer	Stoner Leroy	Episode: "Lady Parts"	
2016	No Tomorrow	Stoner Kid / Skill-Fresh	Episode: "No Rest for the Weary"	
2017	You Me Her	Caleb	Episode: "Weird Janis and the White Trash Baby Vessel"	
2017	The Magicians	Champagne Boy	Episode: "Cheat Day"	
2017–2021	Riverdale	Sweet Pea	Recurring role (season 2–5)	
2019	Hospital Show	Vince	Main role	
2019	Looking for Alaska	Kevin	Main role	
2020	RuPaul's Secret Celebrity Drag Race	Himself / Babykins La Roux	Winner	
2021	Nurses	Matteo	Main role	
2025	Ghosting with Luke Hutchie and Matthew Finlan	Himself	Episode: "Case 207: The Fort"	

=== Music videos ===
Year	Title	Artist	Ref.
2019	"Vessel"	Royal	
2019	"Shoes"	Mina Tobias	
