= Montreal Girls =

2022 Canadian drama film

- Film poster
- Directed by: Patricia Chica
- Written by: Patricia Chica; Kamal John Iskander
- Produced by: Patricia Chica; Bahija Essoussi-Gagnon; Samuel Gagnon
- Starring: Hakim Brahimi; Jade Hassouné; Jasmina Parent; Sana Asad; Nahéma Ricci
- Cinematography: Alexandre Bussière
- Edited by: Patricia Chica
- Music by: Suad Bushnaq; David Deias
- Production companies: Flirt Films; Objectif 9
- Distributed by: Filmoption International; Level 33 Entertainment
- Release date: August 20, 2022 (Cinequest)
- Running time: 94 minutes
- Country: Canada
- Languages: English; French; Arabic

Montreal Girls is a 2022 Canadian drama film, directed by Patricia Chica.

== Plot ==
Ramy stays in his uncle, Hani's house at Montreal after Ramy's mother, Alya's death to study medicine. At night, Ramy meets Hani's son, Tamer who is in a band. Ramy meets Phenix who performs poetry.

Ramy meets Desiree / Desi and Yasmina / Yaz at a club where Tamer's band performs. Ramy gets close to Desiree and Yasmina. Ramy is attracted to Yasmina but Yasmina ghosts Ramy. Tamer advises Ramy to stay away from Yasmina. Ramy hasn't fully recovered from Alya's death and couldn't focus on classes. Ramy aspires to become a poet but decides to study medicine after Alya's death. Ramy hangs out with Desiree. Ramy attends an event promoted by Yasmina. Ramy gives pleasure to Yasmina in a car but Yasmina leaves when Etienne Tremblay arrives. Ramy has a brief conversation with Tamer and Desiree is displeased with Ramy. A passerby advises Ramy near the Saint Lawrence River. Hani gives one of Alya's poems to motivate Ramy.

Ramy attends a poetry event and meets Sophia. Ramy finds Yasmina at a club where Tamer's band performs. Ramy kisses Yasmina which upsets Desiree and Yasmina is not interested in Ramy. Ramy argues with Ramy's father after deciding to quit studying medicine and to study literature. Ramy's father accepts Ramy's decision and Ramy is successfully transferred from Medicine to Literature program in college. Ramy meets Phenix / Felix who is now working at a job rather than pursuing poetry. Tamer asks Ramy to write lyrics for the band. Desiree and Ramy reconcile. Ramy performs poetry at an event and Sophia admires Ramy.

== Summary and Cast ==
The film stars Hakim Brahimi as Ramy, a young Middle Eastern man who moves to Montreal, Quebec, to attend medical school at McGill University following the death of his mother; introduced to the city's arts and culture scene by his cousin Tamer (Jade Hassouné), he becomes drawn into a love triangle with Desiree (Jasmina Parent) and Yaz (Sana Asad), and experiences the urge to abandon school and pursue his creative dream of becoming a poet despite the disapproval of his father (Chadi Alhelou).

The cast also includes Nahéma Ricci, Manuel Tadros, Martin Dubreuil, Guillaume Rodrigue, Thomas Vallières, Natalie Tannous, Marina Harvey, Simon Therrien, David Deias, Arno Schultz, Larry Day, Lanisa Dawn and Bloodshot Bill.

== Production ==
The film's production was first announced in 2018, with Ahmed Malek slated to play the lead, but was subsequently recast to star Brahmi.

Its production in 2020 was heavily impacted by the COVID-19 pandemic.

The screenplay was written by Chica and Kamal John Iskander, and features dialogue in English, French and Arabic.

== Distribution ==
The film premiered at the Cinequest Film & Creativity Festival in 2022, and had additional film festival screenings before going into commercial release in June 2023.

It was distributed by Filmoption International in Canada, and Level 33 Entertainment in the United States.

== Critical response ==
For Film Threat, Bradley Gibson wrote that "The performances bring the story to life with genuine feelings. Brahimi, as Ramy, carries himself with determination as a young man looking for his way in life until his head is turned dramatically by the women that help change everything. Parent, Asad, and Ricci deliver beautiful performances as the gentle muses that at first tear the main character apart but then show him how to rebuild a more authentic life based on his passions. In films where the protagonist radically changes their life for love, art, or money, it’s fun to game out the five years following the finale; to imagine what happens next. The depth of your cynicism dictates where you see the characters a few years later. The film provokes questions about whether the choices made were right and whether they did lead to a happier life down the line. If the path was wrong, would there still be time to correct it?"

Michael Rechtshaffen of the Los Angeles Times wrote that "Armed with a ridiculously photogenic cast, El Salvador-born Chica, a certified Chi Energy acting coach who wrote the script with Kamal John Iskander, coaxes impassioned performances from all concerned, especially Asad’s illusive Yaz, who keeps running from convention to escape the expectations placed upon her by her patriarchal culture. In his first lead role, Brahimi nails the brooding temperament of the frustrated artist, but when called upon to more actively convey the creative fire in his belly, his performance falls short of the required mark, with his Ramy occasionally coming across as a bit of a wet rag."

== Awards ==
The film won the award for Best Feature Film at the 2022 Los Angeles International Film Festival, and the award for Best Debut Feature at the 2023 Female Eye Film Festival.

Alexandre Bussière received a Canadian Screen Award nomination for Best Cinematography at the 12th Canadian Screen Awards in 2024.
