= Neagley =

American television series

- Title card
- Genre: Action; Crime; Detective; Thriller; Drama
- Created by: Nick Santora; Nicholas Wootton
- Based on: Characters of Lee Child
- Starring: Maria Sten; Greyston Holt; Adeline Rudolph; Jasper Jones; Matthew Del Negro; Damon Herriman
- Composer: Tony Morales
- Country of origin: United States
- Original language: English
- No. of series: 1
- No. of episodes: 8

Production
- Executive producers: Nick Santora; Nicholas Wootton; Adam Higgs; Sam Hill; Lisa Kussner; Paula Wagner; Lee Child; Don Granger; David Ellison; Dana Goldberg; Matt Thunell
- Camera setup: Single-camera
- Running time: 41–57 minutes
- Production companies: Nicholas Wootton Productions; Blackjack Films; Paramount Television Studios; Amazon MGM Studios

Original release
- Network: Amazon Prime Video
- Release: September 16, 2026 – present

Related
- Reacher

Neagley (/ˈniːli/) is an American action crime television series created by Nick Santora and Nicholas Wootton for Amazon Prime Video. Based on the character Frances Neagley, created by Lee Child, it is a spin-off of the television series Reacher. It stars Maria Sten, who reprises her role from Reacher, alongside Greyston Holt, Adeline Rudolph, Jasper Jones, Matthew Del Negro, and Damon Herriman.

The first season of Neagley premiered on September 16, 2026. In October 2026, the series was renewed for a second season.

== Premise ==
Frances Neagley, a private investigator based in Chicago, Illinois, seeks the truth after her childhood friend has died in a suspicious accident that leads her to Echo Canyon Farm, a commune that fronts an illegal human experimentation operation run by Lawrence Cole and Invection Pharmaceuticals CEO Pierce Woodrow.

== Cast and characters ==
=== Main ===
- Maria Sten as Frances Neagley, a former U.S. Army Master Sergeant, military police officer, and member of the elite 110th Special Investigations unit, now a private investigator
  - Zion Hutson as young Neagley
- Greyston Holt as Detective Hudson Riley, a Chicago PD officer
- Adeline Rudolph as Renee Birdwhistle, an administrative assistant who works at Neagley's agency
- Jasper Jones as Dion "Keno" Heckathorne, a low-level criminal and recovering drug addict drawn into the investigation
- Matthew Del Negro as Pierce Woodrow (season 1), the CEO of Invection Pharmaceuticals
- Damon Herriman as Lawrence Cole (season 1), the CEO of Echo Canyon Farm

=== Recurring ===
- Tyrone Benskin as Calvin Neagley, Neagley's father
  - Eric Miracle as young Calvin
- Rebecca Liddiard as Judith Gray, the operations director at Echo Canyon
- Joel Keller as Gerald York, a private investigator
- Brian Hamman as Theodore Davos, an assassin
- L. Dean Ifill as Davis, Hudson's colleague
- Jeff Kassel as Lenny McMahon
- John Bregar as Mason, Lawrence's henchman
- Peter Outerbridge as Arvid Rawlings, a criminal mastermind and Swedish billionaire who owns a biotech empire
- James Downing as James Pemmel, a corrupt deputy chief of Chicago PD
- Mal Dassin as Murphy, a crooked police officer and godson of Pemmel
- Jessica Clement as Mandy, an Echo Canyon member who befriends Keno
- Michael Hough as Claude

=== Guest ===
- Alan Ritchson as Jack Reacher, Neagley's closest friend and military comrade
- Jhaleil Swaby as Tommy Crane, Neagley's friend
- Frank Cox-O'Connell as Ford, an assassin
- Stephen Louis Grush as Mickey Riley, Hudson's cousin
- Seán Cullen as Roger Lemkin
- Matthew Finlan as Doyle, a patient
- Emilie Ullerup as Annika, one of Rawlings' assassins
- Anders Yates as Erik, one of Rawlings' assassins
- Jerry O'Connell as a fictional version of himself promoting Tranqlara
- Tara Rosling as Ana
- Ari Cohen as Cory Balega, head of Arvid's mercenaries
- Ian Tracey as Boone Riley, Hudson's criminal father and head of the "Water Rats" crime family
- Justine Nelson as Tracy, Hudson's childhood friend

== Episodes ==
No.	Title	Directed by	Written by	Original release date
1	"L Train"	Sam Hill	Nick Santora & Nicholas Wootton	September 16, 2026
Frances Neagley learns that her best childhood friend Tommy Crane has been killed by a L train after walking onto the tracks. She investigates Tommy's death, and Detective Hudson Riley shows her footage of a boy fleeing the scene, whom she later saves from some thugs. Meanwhile, the CEO of Invection Pharmaceuticals, Pierce Woodrow, pitches his drug Tranqlara to leading psychiatrists. Tommy's trail leads Neagley to Echo Canyon Farm, where she meets its suspicious director of operations, Judith Gray. A pick-up truck tries to kill her, but it crashes and explodes, killing the driver. Neagley learns from Hudson that his family were the Water Rats, a powerful criminal smuggling and weapons trafficking network. Neagley and Hudson retrieve a recording mentioning farm CEO Lawrence Cole, then find the camera repairman dead, leading Neagley to realize that people linked to Echo Canyon's illicit activities are being systematically eliminated.
2	"Team Building Exercises"	Sam Hill	Nicholas Wootton & Nick Santora	September 16, 2026
Two weeks ago, Tommy expressed concern about the farm and the Project, where Tranqlara’s development takes place, but his friend Lulu dismissed his worries. Tommy is then horrified to see her severed finger and confronts Cole, but Cole tells him not to worry. In the present, Neagley and Hudson believe that the camera repairman was a staged suicide. Neagley notices two mercenaries aiming a sniper at them, seeing them through her sniper rifle. Neagley and Hudson visit a bar and enquire about the mercenaries, with the owner revealing their names are Davos and Ford. Neagley later visits her dad and asks about her haphephobia, soon noticing an envelope containing rye powder from Tommy. Neagley and Hudson then chase after Ford and arrest him, and enquire about Cole and the murders, but Ford says Cole was a savior. Later, Neagley sends Keno undercover to the farm. Neagley and Hudson confront the repairman's wife, while Davos aims at them. Cole holds Keno at gunpoint.
3	"Hammer Time"	Gary Fleder	Adam Higgs	September 16, 2026
Four years earlier, Cole unsuccessfully promotes Echo Canyon, but Woodrow offers to finance him. In the present, Neagley wounds Davos on a rooftop, but he escapes. Cole confronts Keno about his drug addiction and accepts him onto the farm. Deputy Chief James Plemel orders Hudson to arrest Neagley, but she escapes and asks her friend Renee Birdwhistle to locate Davos. Hudson later finds Neagley but decides to help her, using Renee's list of unlicensed doctors to track Davos. With Hudson's cousin Mickey, they identify Jens Waller as Davos's doctor. Keno learns about the Project from Mandy. Davos tells Neagley and Hudson that Cole ordered Tommy's death. They stage Neagley's arrest when police arrive, but Officer Murphy kills Davos, claiming he tried to take his gun. At night, Keno enters the Project's barn and discovers a man drugged with Tranqlara injuring himself without feeling pain, along with kilos of the rye flour Tommy previously sent to Neagley.
4	"Breaking & Entering"	Gary Fleder	Kyle Long	September 16, 2026
A year earlier, Cole and Woodrow subjected Owen Vark, a retired veteran, to Tranqlara testing, but it failed. In the present, Keno tells Neagley, Hudson, and Renee about the Project and asks to leave the farm, but Neagley forces him to investigate further. She asks Birdwhistle to identify the other person who served with Davos and Ford in Afghanistan. Gerry York, Neagley's boss, visits her home but finds two thugs there. Murphy threatens Hudson over his account of Davos's death. Renee identifies Davos and Ford's former partner as Owen, now in a psychiatric hospital, and Neagley and Hudson visit him. Owen says Cole promised to eliminate his trauma and reveals that 41 patients came before him. Mandy helps Keno but is punished by Cole and selected for the Project. Neagley discovers Gerry has been murdered in her apartment. Keno sneaks into the barn again and finds bags containing mutilated corpses in a van, hiding among them when he is nearly caught. Neagley drinks the milk that the thugs spiked.
5	"Trip"	Phil Abraham	Lacey Herbert	September 16, 2026
Woodrow reprimands the assassins for killing Gerry, but they assure him that the substance injected into Neagley's milk will soon take effect. At Hudson's house, Renee tells Neagley and Hudson that a government nuclear vault lies beneath the barn, leading them to suspect that Cole and Woodrow use it to experiment on Echo Canyon members. Keno is thrown into a hole with bags meant to be burned, but the men run out of fuel, leaving him trapped. Neagley begins suffering the substance's effects and escapes the house. She hallucinates about seeing her father kill a man when she was a child, and the assassins try to kill her until Hudson arrives and saves her. Keno escapes just as two men set the bodies on fire. Woodrow is reprimanded by his board for years of ineffective Tranqlara testing and threatened with funding cuts. His boss then threatens him about the situation. Renee tells Keno to leave the farm, but he refuses without Mandy. Later, Neagley and Hudson drug Woodrow.
6	"Rocked"	Phil Abraham	Adam Higgs	September 16, 2026
Keno encounters Renee at an Echo Canyon market, as she has gone to rescue him, but when he decides to stay to save Mandy, she reluctantly agrees to help. Neagley and Hudson investigate a pharmaceutical company linked to several deaths in Hamilton and speak with the sister of journalist Doty, who died investigating it. She reveals that Doty and her work were burned. With Renee's help, Keno finds the vault conduit beneath the barn, and Renee admits she forced him to investigate to see if her missing brother was a member. Neagley and Hudson find evidence of Doty's work hidden in a conduit and defeat several thugs, one of whom reveals Woodrow hired them. Keno finds Mandy in the vent and asks her to escape, while Hudson finds evidence linking the operation to his father. Cole has Judith stoned to death after discovering that she doubted his leadership. Armed guards later trap Keno and discover that Mandy betrayed him to Cole.
7	"Lebron's No Jordan"	MJ Bassett	Nicholas Wootton & Nick Santora	September 16, 2026
Neagley confronts her father about killing Elliot Percy, who he reveals was a predator. When she still presses him about it, Calvin suffers a heart attack. Hudson visits his father, Boone, in prison, who asks him to eliminate evidence against a convicted man in exchange for the account number where he was paid. Hudson agrees, sending Neagley to see Tracy, who provides information about Boone's account. They then uncover Rawlings Corp. funding Boone. Mandy visits Keno ostensibly to help him, but he discovers her deception. Hudson steals and burns the evidence and then kills Murphy after a fight. Neagley discovers that the two thugs who want her dead are following her and Renee, who kills them both after a fight. Rawlings visits Woodrow, who proposes killing Cole and installing a new Echo Canyon leader, but Rawlings kills Woodrow and makes Cole his new partner. After discovering Woodrow's death, the trio prepares to prevent Rawlings' getaway, like in Hamilton, and Keno from dying.
8	"Touched"	MJ Bassett	Nick Santora & Nicholas Wootton	September 16, 2026
Rawlings' mercenaries trick Cole into believing there is a FBI raid, sending everyone to the vault beneath the barn. Neagley, Hudson, and Renee enter and discover Rawlings' plans to kill everyone and destroy the operation with bombs. Neagley sends Renee to find them. A distraction allows several Echo Canyon members to escape. Keno escapes and reunites with Renee. The group retrieves the hard drives and leaves the vault as Neagley uses a walkie to detonate the bombs, killing Cole. Finding Rawlings, Neagley injects him with Tranqlara; he walks into traffic and is run over, avenging Tommy. Neagley learns Tommy went to Echo Canyon after being abused by Percy; Calvin killed Percy because of this. She goes to apologize to her dad but discovers he has died. After his funeral, Jack Reacher visits Neagley, who begins to overcome her haphephobia by shaking his hand; Echo Canyon's crimes are exposed. Using the money Reacher gave her, Neagley reopens the detective agency with Hudson, Renee and Keno.

== Production ==
=== Development ===
First season promotional poster

The series was ordered by Amazon Prime Video in October 2024. Nick Santora and Nicholas Wootton developed, executive produced, and are co-showrunners of the series, which was produced by Amazon MGM Studios and Skydance Television, along with CBS Studios. The series is also executive-produced by Adam Higgs, Sam Hill, Lisa Kussner, Paula Wagner, Lee Child, Don Granger, David Ellison, Dana Goldberg, and Matt Thunell. By August 2025, Paramount Television Studios had taken over production of the series following the merger of Skydance Television's parent company Skydance Media with CBS Studios' parent Paramount Global into Paramount Skydance. In October 2026, the series was renewed for a second season.

=== Writing ===
The series' writing team is composed of Nick Santora & Nicholas Wootton, Adam Higgs, Kyle Long, and Lacey Herbert. Neagley explores the title character's life in greater detail than in Reacher. Sten said: "Neagley has a lot going on in her life. She has a history, and she has a life lived. She has some quite severe personal issues of her own that she's grappling with… I'm just thrilled to get going and sink my teeth in".

=== Casting ===
Sten reprises her role of Frances Neagley from Reacher with Alan Ritchson appearing as Jack Reacher in a guest starring role. In February 2025, Greyston Holt, Adeline Rudolph, Jasper Jones, Matthew Del Negro and Damon Herriman were cast as series regulars.

=== Filming ===
Principal photography began in Toronto, Ontario, Canada, on February 18, 2025, and wrapped on June 7, 2025.

== Release ==
The eight-episode first season of Neagley was released in its entirety on September 16, 2026, on Amazon Prime Video.

== Reception ==
The review aggregator website Rotten Tomatoes reported a 94% approval rating, based on 31 critic reviews, with an average rating of 7.2/10. The website's critics consensus states, "Neagley isn't Reacher and it uses that to its advantage to chart its own thrilling path towards action hero greatness." Metacritic, which uses a weighted average, assigned a score of 67 out of 100 based on 15 critics, indicating "generally favorable reviews".
