= All the Lost Ones =

2024 film by Mackenzie Donaldson

- Theatrical release poster
- Directed by: Mackenzie Donaldson
- Written by: Anthony Grant; Cheryl Meyer
- Produced by: Yipeng Ben Lu; David J. Phillips; Yas Taalat; Mackenzie Donaldson; Chantal Kemp
- Starring: Jasmine Mathews; Douglas Smith; Vinessa Antoine; Lochlyn Munro; Steven Ogg; Matthew Finlan; Anthony Grant; Sheila McCarthy; Devon Sawa
- Cinematography: Ashley Iris Gill
- Edited by: Sydney Cowper
- Music by: Trevor Yuile
- Production companies: Electric Panda Entertainment; The Donaldson Company
- Distributed by: Levelfilm
- Release dates: September 19, 2024 (Cinéfest); November 29, 2024 (Canada)
- Running time: 106 minutes
- Country: Canada
- Language: English

All the Lost Ones is a 2024 Canadian science fiction thriller film, produced and directed by Mackenzie Donaldson. The film is a post-apocalyptic thriller centred on the aftermath of a North American civil war brought on by the effects of rampant climate change.

== Plot ==
In Canada, a civil war is started which is brought on by the effects of climate change, and many citizens died from contaminated tap water, and environmental extremists refuse to exit the capital until a water bill is passed. A militia group, named the United Conservancy, does damage across the capital, while there is no word on the agreement of the water bill, and the shutdown of the government is initiated. Six months later, the United Conservancy occupied a large portion of the North Eastern Seaboard, while groups of civilians find themselves in hiding between two sides of the civil war.

Nia, a civilian woman, goes outside from a party, and finds a carcass laying on the water. The next day, Nia, Dawn and Ray set off on a journey, where they head to an abandoned small town. Nia enters a newspaper store, when she encounters a young man and his father, who strikes her. She confesses to them that she was separated three days ago. She shoots the father. The young boy flees, and shoots Ray in the leg.

The group returns home to heal Ray's leg. The United Conservancy arrives, where the family are forced to cooperate. The family confess that they formally surrender to the United Conservancy. The family shares what happened to Ray. The family decide to take a boat, but Ray refuses to go to the boat.

Mikael is ambushed by the United Conservancy. The UC finds Ray's carcass, and Mikael confesses that he buried his friends. Mikael is soon shot by the young boy. Meanwhile, the family treks a woods. The United Conservancy spot the group, prompting them to split up and hide. Ethan and Nia flee. They a burning house. There, Nia finds a carcass of a shot woman sitting on the deck. Nia tearfully shares her crimes she committed to Ethan.

Nia and Ethan head to Jacob's stepdad's cabin, where Nia reconciles with Penny, along with the rest of the group. Jacob warns the group that his father will shoot anyone who steps foot to the cabin. Jacob sneaks into a truck at the cabin to retrieve gasoline and the keys to the boat, but is interrupted by Hank. A gunfight ensues, ending with Hank being shot dead. Jacob returns to the group with the gasoline. As the group sets off to go the boat, Ethan gets his foot caught on a trap, preventing him to walk on his legs, and joins Jacob and Penny to head to the boat, while leaving Ethan behind.

The group heads to a boat site to get to the boat to escape. Penny gets shoot, where Nia gets sad over the former's death. The group returns to land, while Nia feels sad over memories of Penny.

== Cast ==
- Jasmine Mathews as Nia
- Douglas Smith as Ethan
- Vinessa Antoine as Penny
- Lochlyn Munro as Hank
- Steven Ogg as Mikael
- Matthew Finlan as Jacob
- Anthony Grant as Raymond
- Sheila McCarthy as Dawn
- Devon Sawa as Conrad
- Alexander Elliot as Wyatt
- Jonathan Cherry as Vice
- Kim Roberts as Nancy
- Cody Sparshu as Nomad
- Gregory 'Dominic' Odjig as Gary
- Stefani Kimber as Ripley
- Michael Lipka as Renaissance
- Lexie Mitchell as Zoe
- Richard Patrick Tolton II.

== Production ==
Principal photography took place in North Bay, Ontario.

== Release ==
The film premiered at the 2024 Cinéfest Sudbury International Film Festival. The film was theatrically released in Canada on November 29, 2024, debuting in Vancouver, and had a week-long theatrical run at the Carlton Cinema at Toronto, before having a streaming release on Paramount+ on December 13. Epic Pictures released the film in the United States in select theaters on April 18, 2025, with a VOD release on April 22.

== Reception ==
Carla Hay of Culture Mix criticized the plot holes and acting. Leslie Felperin of The Guardian wrote "The dramatic rhythms of tension/release... do grow a little metronymic over the long haul. But in terms of politics, the film is at its best when drawing out how polarisation tears apart families as well as nations: the personal is always political."
