= Alexandre Bussière =

Canadian cinematographer from Quebec

Alexandre Bussière is a Canadian cinematographer from Quebec. He is most noted for his work on the 2022 film Montreal Girls, for which he received a Canadian Screen Award nomination for Best Cinematography at the 12th Canadian Screen Awards in 2024.

Bussière's other credits have included the films Exit 67 (Sortie 67), Where Atilla Passes (Là où Atilla passe) and The Sacrifice Game.
