= Patricia Chica =

Canadian film director and screenwriter

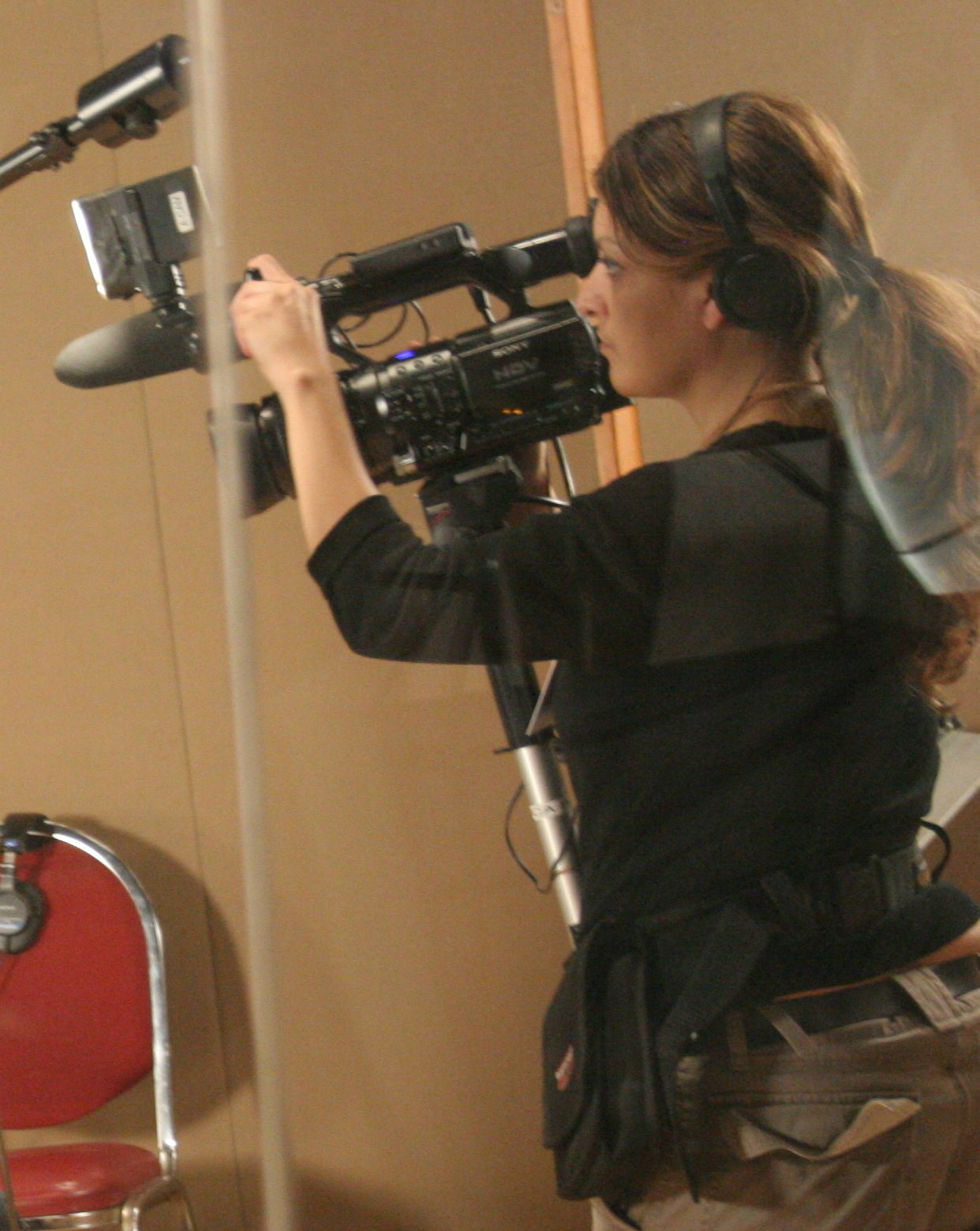
- Chica filming in 2010
- Born: Patricia Chica Gizzi; San Salvador, El Salvador
- Occupation(s): Director, Filmmaker, Writer, Producer
- Years active: 1990–present

Patricia Chica also known as Chicatronica is a Canadian film and television director, producer and writer.

The American horror movie site Dread Central referenced her in their list of the "Rising Female Filmmakers" to watch along other notable female directors like the Soska Sisters and Jennifer Kent. "Patricia Chica is known for making bold, edgy, and visually striking independent films”, mentioned the article.

Chica promotes an environment of expression, harmony and growth thanks to an integrated creative process involving Chi Energy.

== Life and career ==
From 2001 to 2008, Patricia worked as a writer, director and producer on a documentary series shot around the world for networks such as National Geographic, CBC, Showcase, OLN, CTV, W Network, Oxygen, Discovery-Travel Channel.

In 2008, Patricia completed another author-driven documentary entitled Rockabilly 514, co-directed with British filmmaker Mike Wafer. For over four years, they documented the lives and tribulations of a group of young people who live a lifestyle inspired by 1950's rock n' roll music. The film won the Best Documentary Award at the Director's Chair Film Festival in New York and has been screened at numerous festivals around the world.

Patricia Chica was ranked by popular vote #10 (in 2009), #5 (in 2010), #8 (in 2011) and #10 (2012) in the Top 10 list of the best local filmmakers in the Montreal Mirror Reader's Poll, making her the first female director to ever be part of the list.

In 2013, the readers of CULT #MTL Magazine voted for Patricia Chica in the TOP 3 of the Best Local Filmmakers making her the only female on the list. Her short film Ceramic Tango also made it to the TOP 4 in the Best Local Film category.

In 2015, Patricia Chica was part of the Anthology film Women in Horror Month PSA. She is listed by Dread Central in the "Rising Female Filmmakers" to watch.

In 2022 she released the theatrical feature film Montreal Girls.

== Filmography (selected work) ==
- 2005 - 5 Takes (series producer season 1, director - television series)
- 2008 - Rockabilly 514 (co-director, cinematographer - feature-length documentary)
- 2022 - Montreal Girls
