= Evangelia Andreadaki =

Greek actress

Evangelia Andreadaki (Greek: Ευαγγελία Ανδρεαδάκη) is a Greek actress. She is sometimes credited as Vangelio Andreadaki. Her film credits include Smac, Little England and Black Field. Andreadaki also co-starred in the television series Eho ena mystiko.

== Filmography (partial) ==
Year	Title	Role	Notes
2002	The King	Gergia	
2003	Eyes of the Night	Eleftheria	Credited as Vangelio Andreadaki. Won:Greek State Film Award for Best Actress
2011	The Building Manager	Niki	Credited as Vangelio Andreadaki
2009	Black Field	Dorothea	
2013	Little England		
2015	Smac	Eleni	Won:Hellenic Film Academy Award for Best Actress
2024	Arcadia	Despina	World Premiere at the 74th Berlin International Film Festival
