= Superhost (film) =

2021 film directed by Brandon Christensen

- Film poster
- Directed by: Brandon Christensen
- Written by: Brandon Christensen
- Produced by: Kurtis David Harder; Brandon Christensen
- Starring: Sara Canning; Osric Chau; Gracie Gillam
- Cinematography: Clayton Moore
- Edited by: Brandon Christensen
- Music by: Blitz//Berlin
- Distributed by: Shudder
- Release date: August 14, 2021
- Running time: 84 minutes
- Country: United States
- Language: English

Superhost is a 2021 American horror film written and directed by Brandon Christensen. It stars Sara Canning, Osric Chau, and Gracie Gillam, and features Barbara Crampton in a supporting role.

== Premise ==
Claire and Teddy, two struggling travel vloggers, rent a vacation house for new video content. Once there, they must deal with the strange behavior of their host Rebecca.

== Cast ==
- Sara Canning as Claire
- Osric Chau as Teddy
- Gracie Gillam as Rebecca
- Barbara Crampton as Vera

== Release ==
Superhost was released in the United States on August 14, 2021 at the Popcorn Frights Film Festival.

== Reception ==
On the review aggregator website Rotten Tomatoes, 85% of 27 critics' reviews are positive. The website's consensus reads: "Gracie Gillam's four-star performance helps Superhost roll out a blood red carpet for horror fans seeking delightfully grim accommodations." Brian Tallerico, writing for RogerEbert.com, gave the film 2.5 stars out of 4, calling it "slight" but praising Gracie Gillam's "impressively unhinged performance".

== See also ==
- The Rental
