= Hospital Show =

Canadian comedy web series

- Genre: Comedy drama; Medical drama
- Starring: Sara Canning; Adrian Holmes; Adam Greydon Reid; Jordan Connor; Enid-Raye Adams; Valerie Tian
- Country of origin: Canada
- Original language: English
- No. of seasons: 1
- No. of episodes: 10

Production
- Producer: Adam Greydon Reid
- Editor: Adam Greydon Reid

Original release
- Network: Telus TV
- Release: October 24, 2019

Hospital Show is a Canadian comedy web series about the cast of the fictional hit primetime medical drama Critical Condition. The series was created, written, directed, produced and edited by Adam Greydon Reid. The short form series premiered in late 2019 on YouTube in ten 5–7 minute chapters, and Telus's Optik streaming platform in its feature length form.

Hospital Show received two Canadian Screen Award nominations at the 8th Canadian Screen Awards in 2020, for Best Lead Performance in a Program or Series Produced for Digital Media (Canning) and Best Supporting Performance in a Program or Series Produced for Digital Media (Reid). Hospital Show was the winner of the Best Web/TV series at the 2020 Florence Film Awards Competition.

In March 2022, it was announced that Saloon Media and Bullrush Pictures would co-develop and co-produce a full half-hour television series adaptation of Hospital Show.

== Plot ==
Charlie Nielson is a medical school dropout come actress, who was on track to become a respected doctor, but plays one on television instead. Now she has had enough of working for the network and wants to become a real doctor.

== Cast and characters ==
- Sara Canning as Charlie
- Adrian Holmes as Rich
- Adam Greydon Reid as Will
- Jordan Connor as Vince
- Enid-Raye Adams as Carol-Ann
- Valerie Tian as Astrid

== Episodes ==
No.	Title	Original release date
1	"Number One"	October 24, 2019
Charlie Nielson is a med-school dropout who, instead of becoming a real doctor, is pretending to be one on television.
2	"Droopy"	October 24, 2019
Critical Condition's showrunner, Rosanna, thinks Charlie's scrubs make everything look "droopy". Will wants to prove he is still a good fake surgeon.
3	"Not That Kind of Ball"	October 24, 2019
Rich has got something on his left testicle, but Charlie refuses to diagnose him. Vince receives a secret surprise envelope to open in front of his followers.
4	"Lefty Lucy"	October 24, 2019
Vince, Will and Astrid perform surgery on a banana. Charlie finally inspects Rich's left testicle.
5	"The Surprise"	October 24, 2019
Vince finds out what's inside Astrid's envelope, as do all his followers.
6	"The Wiz"	October 24, 2019
Vince finds out that he is going to be a father.
7	"Butt Flies"	October 24, 2019
Charlie realizes she wants to be a real doctor. Vince gets angry faces on his feed.
8	"New Zealand's for Pussies"	October 24, 2019
Vince steps on Astrid's surprise. Will's patient dies. Charlie meets a real doctor.
9	"Kiss Her"	October 24, 2019
Rich tries to kiss Charlie.
10	"Not Dead Yet"	October 24, 2019
The actor-doctors manage to save a real life.
