= Jade Hassouné =

Canadian actor, dancer and singer (born 1991)

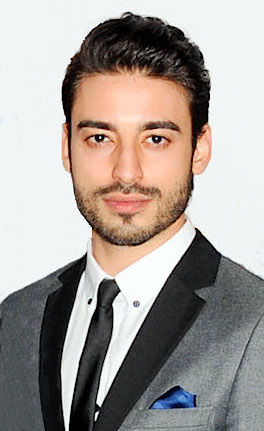
- Hassouné in 2013
- Born: 18 February 1991 (age 35); Lebanon
- Education: John Abbott College; CBC Actors Conservatory
- Occupations: Actor; dancer; singer
- Years active: 2011–present

Jade Hassouné (born 18 February 1991) is a Canadian actor, dancer and singer. He is known for his roles as Meliorn in the US television series Shadowhunters and as Prince Ahmed Al Saeed in the Canadian series Heartland.

Under the pseudonym J4DE, in 2020 he released the EP Love Letter to a Fandom.

== Early life ==
Hassouné was born in Lebanon. Due to conflict, his family left the country when Hassouné was a year old, moving first to Geneva, Switzerland and then to Montreal, Canada in 1996. He grew up attending French school. He became interested in acting when he was 10 and joined a local theatre group. He graduated from the Musical Theatre programme at John Abbott College in 2008 before going on to train at the Canadian Film Centre CBC Actors Conservatory, completing in 2012. He moved to Toronto upon graduation.

== Career ==
=== Acting ===
Hassouné landed his first onscreen role in the film Laurentie in 2011, his debut in his acting career. He also starred alongside Emily Osment in the 2011 ABC Family film Cyberbully.

In June 2015, he auditioned for the role of Alec in the Shadowhunters series broadcast by Freeform and Netflix outside the United States. A week later, the casting directors called him back to audition for the role of Raphael, but the following week he was contacted again for an audition for the role of Meliorn. He was later chosen to play this role.

In 2016, appeared in season 2 of the web series That's My DJ on YouTube and plays the role of Sam. The Season 3 focuses on his character Sam, which makes him the main actor in the series. He also participated in this season's production.

=== Other ventures ===
Hassouné was a member of the dance group Enigma Dance Productions and together they participated in the TV show Canada's Got Talent where they arrived in the quarter-finals.

He collaborated with Ubisoft Toronto to develop the video game Starlink: Battle For Atlas.

In 2019, Hassouné, under the name J4DE, released the EP Love Letter to a Fandom. Its singles included "Insta Story", "To the Next", "Living Right Now" and "Human".

== Discography ==
=== EPs ===
- 2020 Love Letter To A Fandom EP (credited to J4DE)

=== Songs / videos ===
- 2019: "Insta Story"
- 2019: "To the Next"
- 2019: "Living Right Now"
- 2020: "Insta Story Remix"
- 2020: "Human"
- 2024: "Radio Silence"

== Filmography ==
Film roles
| Year | Title | Role | Notes |
|---|---|---|---|
| 2011 | Laurentia (Laurentie) | Jay Kashyap | |
| 2011 | Her Night | Peter | |
| 2011 | Cyberbully | Caleb | |
| 2012 | The Expatriate | Adbi | |
| 2014 | Brick Mansions | Peter | |
| 2015 | After the Ball | Peter | |
| 2015 | Inner Jellyfishes (Les Méduses) | | |
| 2022 | Montreal Girls | Tamer | |
| 2024 | We Forgot to Break Up | Malik | |

Television roles
| Year | Title | Role | Notes |
|---|---|---|---|
| 2013–2014 | Heartland | Prince Ahmed Al Saeed | 8 episodes |
| 2016 | Orphan Black | Aaron | Episode: "The Collapse of Nature" |
| 2016–2017 | That's My DJ | Sam | 14 episodes; also associate producer |
| 2016–2019 | Shadowhunters | Meliorn | 17 episodes |
| 2017 | Barbelle | Alejandro | Episode: "#1.5" |
| 2020 | Canada's Drag Race | Himself | Guest host, Episode: "Her-itage Moments" |
| 2024 | Ghosting with Luke Hutchie and Matthew Finlan | Himself | |

Dubber roles
| Year | Title | Role | Notes |
|---|---|---|---|
| 2016 | Far Cry Primal | | voice in the video game |
