= Nina Sten-Knudsen =

Danish painter

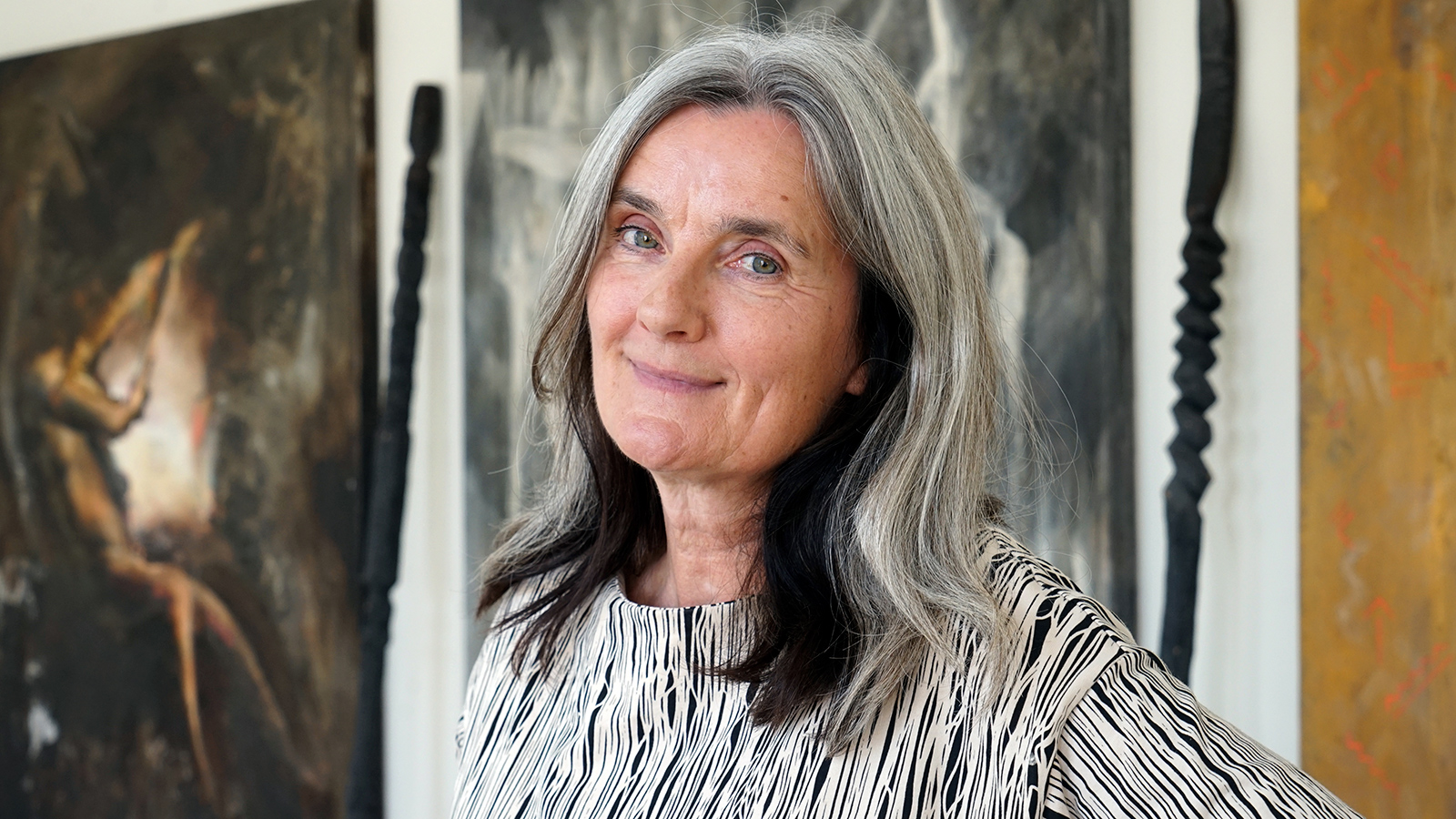
Nina Sten-Knudsen (2018)

Nina Sten-Knudsen (born 1957) is a Danish painter who played a central role in the Danish Wild Youth trend in the 1980s. She gained recognition from her participation in the 1982 exhibition Kniven på hovedet (Knife on the Head) held at Tranegården in Gentofte. More recently, her large landscapes raise existential questions of past and present, the merits of the modern world and the meaning of painting.

== Biography ==
Born in Gentofte on 2 December 1957, she is the daughter of the biophysicist Ove Sten-Knudsen and the artist Nan-Marie Græbe. She is of Swedish descent through her mother. She studied painting under Egon Bjerg Nielsen at the Glyptotek (1975–77) before attending the Royal Danish Academy of Fine Arts where she studied under Sven Dalsgaard, Robert Jacobsen and Hein Heinsen (1977–82).

After first collaborating with the Wild Youth movement, Sten-Knudsen developed an interest in prehistory and Nordic mythology as well as in primitive cultures such as the North American Indians, evidence of which can be seen in her landscapes. In the early 1980s, she introduced animals such as the wolf, the eagle, the horse and especially the stag in her primitive works. In the 1990s, figures disappeared from her landscapes which became increasingly empty and monochromatic.

Her works explore basic existential themes of evil, past and present, the merits of the modern world and the meaning of painting. She has moved towards panoramic landscapes and cityscapes. Her Girl With a Knife (2007) first looks like a classical landscape but on closer examination it seems to consist of a number of fragments without any general perspective, bringing together past and present as well as the near and far. Since 2009, she has been working on a huge project, creating 130 images forming part of a narrative examining the origin of evil, each with a sometimes lengthy descriptive title.

In addition to a series of scholarships, in 2000 Sten-Knudsen was awarded the Eckersberg Medal. Her works can be seen in art museums throughout Denmark as well as in Chemnitz, Würzburg and Gothenburg.

Her daughter Maria Sten is a Danish actress, writer, director and beauty pageant titleholder.
