= Blackfield (disambiguation) =

Blackfield is an English pop band

Blackfield may also refer to:

- Blackfield, Hampshire
- Blackfield & Langley F.C.
- Blackfield (album)

== See also ==
- Black Field (2009 Canadian film), 2009 Canadian historical drama film
- Black Field (2009 Greek film)
