= Haphephobia =

Fear of touching or being touched

- Other names: Haphophobia
- Specialty: Psychiatry

Haphephobia (also known as aphephobia, haphophobia, hapnophobia, hapnephobia, haptephobia, haptophobia, thixophobia, aphenphosmphobia and chiraptophobia) is a specific phobia that involves the fear of touching or of being touched. It can be caused by sexual abuse. Treatments include antidepressants and other medication, cognitive-behavioral therapy and exposure therapy.

== Signs and symptoms ==
As with other phobias and anxiety conditions, haphephobia may come with anxiety and stress-related symptoms that vary among those that suffer from it. A non-exhaustive list of potential symptoms that those suffering from haphephobia may have includes:

- Chest pain
- Choking sensation
- Cold or hot flushes
- Cholinergic urticaria
- Dissociation
- Dizziness
- Fear of dying
- Fear of loss of control
- Feeling of being trapped
- Heart palpitations
- Hyperventilation
- Nausea
- Sense of impending danger
- Sweating
- Tingling and shivering sensations
- Trembling
- Anger

== Popular culture ==
- In the 1987 teen film Three O'Clock High, the main antagonist Buddy Revell physically assaults anyone who physically touches him.
- In the 1989 manga Berserk, the main character Guts has haphephobia as a result of being raped as a child.
- In the 2006 novel Nature Girl, one of the main characters Boyd Shreave claims to have aphenphosmphobia.
- In the 2007 film Lars and the Real Girl, the main character Lars Lindstrom describes being touched by others as a burning sensation, and refuses to allow this for most of the film.
- In the 2007 manga Freezing, the main heroine has this phobia due to her traumatic background. This is a very notable case of it.
- In the 2012 Nintendo tactical RPG Fire Emblem Awakening, the character Libra has haphephobia as a result of abuse and neglect from his parents.
- In the 2011 erotic novel Fifty Shades of Grey, Christian Grey has haphephobia as a result of childhood abuse (including cigarette burns inflicted on his upper body) and neglect.
- In the 2013 trilogy All for the Game, one of the main characters, Andrew Minyard, has haphephobia due to his abusive childhood spent in foster care. Throughout the series, his condition and his mentality regarding it are explored.
- In the 2014 second season of The Following, Mark Grey, one of the twin psychopaths played by Sam Underwood, admits to suffering from haphephobia in Episode 5.
- In the 2015 novel Echoes by Laura Tisdall, the main character, Mallory Park, has haphephobia, and wears gloves as a result.
- In the 2015 film Our Brand Is Crisis, the protagonist, played by Sandra Bullock, has the condition.
- In the 2015 TV series Mr. Robot, protagonist Elliot Alderson is strongly implied to suffer from haphephobia, frequently avoiding the touch of others.
- In the 2015 novel Six of Crows, protagonist Kaz Brekker has this condition, causing him to wear gloves and take other measures in order to avoid skin contact. His struggles with haphephobia and attempts to overcome it are explored as a subplot throughout the duology.
- In the 2016 Jack Reacher novel Night School, and the 2026 TV series, it is revealed his former Sergeant Neagley has haphephobia.
- In the 2019 game Death Stranding, the main character Sam Porter has haphephobia (which is referred to in-game as aphenphosmphobia) and his condition is shown throughout the game.
- In Chinese drama series Cute Bodyguard, the main lead Gu Rong has haphephobia and only goes easy with Su Jingjing.
- In the 2016 Indonesian novel Jakarta Sebelum Pagi, one of the main characters, Abel has haphephobia and ligyrophobia.
- In the 2024 Indian Telugu film Gaami, the main character has haphephobia and the story revolves around his quest to find the cure.
- In Season 1 of the 2026 Prime Video series Neagley, the main character (Frances Neagley) suffers from haphephobia. The storyline includes evidence that she didn't always have it and part of the story deals with her search for more information about her condition.

== See also ==
- List of phobias
- Hyperesthesia
