= Georgia Miller (character) =

Fictional character

- Ginny & Georgia character
- Brianne Howey as Georgia Miller
- First appearance: "Pilot"; Ginny & Georgia; February 24, 2021
- Created by: Sarah Lampert
- Portrayed by: Brianne Howey; Nikki Roumel

In-universe information
- Full name: Mary Reilly
- Nicknames: Chewbacca; Mayoress; Mayoress Murderess; Peach
- Gender: Female
- Occupation: Mayor Assistant; con artist; Mother
- Family: Shane Reilly (father); Daisy Atkins (mother); Ed Atkins (stepfather); Maddie Atkins (half‑sister)
- Spouses: Kenny Drexel (deceased); Anthony Greene (deceased); Paul Randolph (divorced)
- Significant others: Gil Timmins (broken up); Zion Miller (dated, on and off)
- Children: Ginny Miller; Austin Miller
- Nationality: American (portrayed as living in Massachusetts)

Georgia Miller (born Mary Reilly; formerly known as Georgia Warren and Georgia Greene) is one of the title characters of the American comedy-drama television series Ginny & Georgia. She is portrayed by Brianne Howey. The character is the series’ central adult figure and the mother of Ginny Miller and Austin Miller. A suspected serial killer and con artist, she combines maternal care with manipulative and criminal behavior. Georgia became a mother at the age of 15 and has spent her life running from danger, suffering through abusive relationships, and committing fraud and murder to give her children a secure life.

Georgia’s early life is depicted through flashbacks and plot twists that reveal her life of childhood abuse, teen parenthood, and constant reinvention. Her younger self is portrayed by Nikki Roumel. Howey described Georgia as diabolical but also well-intentioned. She noted that because Georgia grew up without stability or a safety net, she operates with a limited toolbox.

Georgia served as Assistant Mayor of Wellsbury, Massachusetts, a fictional town, across two seasons after her marriage to Mayor Paul Randolph, before being arrested for murder. Howey’s portrayal of Georgia Miller has received praise. Critics and viewers have described the character as a standout and unusual portrayal of motherhood in modern television.

== Character background ==
=== Fictional biography ===
Georgia, born Mary Reilly to Daisy and Shane Reilly. At six, her father was arrested and later imprisoned at New Mexico State Penitentiary for attempted murder. Her mother married Ed Atkins, with whom she had another daughter, Maddie.

She grew up in Alabama, where she experienced physical and sexual abuse from her stepfather, Ed Atkins, from a young age. Georgia's mother, Daisy, was an addict. Georgia primarily cared for her younger half-sister, Maddie Atkins, during their childhood while living with their mother, Daisy, and stepfather, Ed. Maddie later appears in the first season episode "Boo, Bitch," having tracked down Georgia in the town of Wellsbury after finding her through Ginny Miller’s social media. As a result of a violent confrontation at her home at the age of 14, she chose to flee and live on her own. While hitchhiking, she came across a biker gang known as the Blood Eyes. When asked her name, she adopted the name "Georgia" after seeing a highway sign for the US state of Georgia close by.

Georgia had left an abusive home and was living alone at the age of 15 and started hanging out with the neighbourhood biker group. At a bar, she ran into 17-year-old Zion Miller. She started dating Zion Miller after the two grew close. Later on, Georgia quickly became pregnant, and Ginny, their daughter, was born. Georgia and the child briefly lived with Zion and his parents. However, the arrangement became strained when Zion’s parents suggested they might seek guardianship of the baby so that Zion could pursue higher education. Fearing that she might lose custody of her daughter, Georgia left the household with Ginny and resumed living independently. Although Georgia and Zion never married, their lives remained intermittently connected as Zion continued to appear in the lives of both Georgia and Ginny. Georgia retained Zion’s surname, Miller, as her legal name.

=== Relationship with Ginny Miller ===
Promotional portrait of Georgia Miller and Ginny Miller

The relationship between Georgia and her daughter Ginny Miller is one of the core relationships that define the plot of Ginny & Georgia. Georgia is protective of Ginny and always justifies her actions as being for the betterment of her children’s lives. However, the two have also had an antagonistic relationship. As Ginny becomes older, she starts questioning her mother’s behaviour and the reasons behind their constant movements.

Ginny struggles to balance her love for her mother with the many unsettling facts she learns about her past throughout the story. The main character's attempts to become independent are aided by the tension this causes between the two. The two characters have an emotional connection that is primarily described as a complex mixture of feelings, regardless of the confrontational moments and the distance between the two.

Throughout the series, Ginny struggles with the burden of her mother’s secrets and morally questionable choices made in the name of survival, including discovering Georgia’s involvement in multiple crimes, which undermines her trust and affects her mental health. In Season 2, Ginny begins therapy to address the trauma, widening the emotional gap between them.

== Legal issues and crimes ==
In season 2, Georgia is arrested at her wedding to Mayor Paul Randolph for the killing of Tom Fuller, the husband of her friend Cynthia. Though she believed it to be an act of compassion, investigators view it as murder.

=== Murder of Anthony Green ===
Georgia's first husband, Anthony Green, who had a big impact on her early years as a young single mother, is the first known murder in the series.

While living in New Orleans as a teenager, Georgia Miller met Anthony Greene, an older man who served as both her landlord and employer. At the time, Georgia was seventeen and raising her young daughter, Ginny Miller. Facing legal trouble after operating an illegal gambling operation, she risked losing custody of her child. In an attempt to present a more stable life to authorities, she agreed to marry Greene after he supported her claim that they were engaged.

Georgia became resentful of Greene's increasingly domineering behaviour after their marriage. She later added a lot of sleeping pills to his drink, seemingly with the intention of making him unconscious rather than killing him, according to flashbacks shown in Ginny & Georgia. Then, during the night, Greene choked to death. Following his passing, Georgia made contact with former acquaintances from the Blood Eyes biker gang, who assisted in disposing of the body. In the end, the authorities handled Greene's disappearance as abandonment, so Georgia was able to leave the scene without raising any red flags.

=== Murder of Kenny Drexel ===
Kenny Drexel is Georgia Miller’s second husband and the second person she is shown to have murdered in the series. His death, a key plot point in Season 1, triggers much of the series’ central conflict.

Although some details are left unclear in the series, Georgia discovers that her husband Drexel is acting inappropriately toward her teenage daughter, Ginny, by sexually abusing her. In retaliation, she poisons Kenny by adding a toxic flower known as "wolfsbane" to his protein shake. The flower caused cardiac arrest when Kenny drank the shake on his way to work, resulting in a car accident while driving, which led to Kenny's death.

Private investigator Gabriel Cordova, who assumes the identity of a school teacher and is also a date for Nick, Georgia's co-worker at the Mayor's Office, suspects Georgia and starts investigating Kenny's death. He discovers that there is a pattern of suspicious deaths and disappearances linked to her relationships, including Kenny's. Nevertheless, Georgia does not face prosecution due to the absence of physical evidence, especially since she arranges for his cremation.

=== Murder of Tom Fuller ===
The murder of Tom Fuller is the most notable killing by Georgia Miller in Ginny & Georgia, directly leading to her arrest. The event occurs near the end of Season 2, exposing the cracks in Georgia’s carefully maintained facade.

Tom Fuller, the husband of Cynthia Fuller, Georgia’s rival-turned-acquaintance in Wellsbury, Massachusetts, suffered a stroke and is kept alive by machines at home. Georgia visits Tom at home and smothers him with a pillow while offering quiet reassurances. Cynthia, unaware of Georgia’s role, later appreciates that Tom died peacefully. The death initially goes unnoticed due to Tom’s poor health but is later revealed through surveillance and investigation by private investigator Gabriel Cordova. Georgia’s arrest for Tom Fuller’s murder happened during her wedding to Mayor Paul Randolph.

== Portrayal and reception ==
Georgia Miller is portrayed by American actress Brianne Howey in the Netflix series Ginny & Georgia.

=== Casting ===
Howey was cast in 2019, before the show’s 2021 premiere, and has since become closely linked to the role. According to Entertainment Weekly, Brianne Howey was the final and eventually defining, choice for the role of Georgia Miller. After a long casting process that included auditions from actors in the U.S., Canada, and the U.K., Howey submitted her audition tape just days after returning from a European vacation. Showrunner Debra J. Fisher recalled

"We watched the tape really late Friday night or on the weekend, and we were like, ‘We must meet this woman.’ Monday morning, we brought her in, read her with Toni [Gentry], and we were like, ‘We just found Ginny and Georgia. There they are."

— Debra J. Fisher on Georgia's casting

=== Reception ===
Georgia garnered positive critical reactions for her layered complexity. Critics often describe her as a compelling and unconventional anti-hero, praising Ginny & Georgia for immersing viewers in the ethical tension woven throughout her narrative.

Shilyn Carheel of The Teen Magazine noted that series presents Georgia through a sympathetic perspective, emphasizing her resilience and traumatic past, which encourages audience identification. However, Carheel noted that this framing often downplays the severity of her actions, including manipulation, deceit, and violence. Discussion of the character frequently highlights how shifting perspective alters interpretation: while Georgia appears justified within her own narrative, alternative viewpoints present her as exploitative and harmful. Her relationships and parenting have also drawn scrutiny, with many arguing that her decisions, though framed as protective, negatively affect those around her. As a result, reception remains divided between viewing her as a sympathetic antihero and as a fundamentally flawed character.

The character has emerged as a cultural reference and a topic of discussion regarding flawed yet empowered female figures in contemporary TV.

=== Georgia Miller and Lorelai Gilmore Comparison ===
Following the release of Ginny & Georgia in 2021, Georgia Miller was immediately compared to Lorelai Gilmore, the protagonist of Gilmore Girls. With Georgia herself making an explicit comparison between the two in the pilot episode of the show, where she tells Ginny, "We are like the Gilmore Girls.

Both Georgia and Lorelai became mothers as teenagers and sought new lives in tight-knit communities, quickly integrating into local social circles. Each also attracted the attention of a restaurateur and experienced the reappearance of their daughters' fathers in remarkably similar ways. Critics have stated that what distinguished the two characters from one another was becoming more important than their similarities. Lorelai moved out of the home due to the fact that her parents were unhappy about her decision-making, while Georgia ran away from her home because of the abuse she was facing. Some critics felt that Ginny & Georgia tackled the negative effects of a parent acting like a peer more seriously than the Gilmore Girls series.
