= BabyZone.com =

Website for mothers and mothers-to-be

- Website type: Reference pages
- Owner: The Walt Disney Company
- Website: BabyZone.com
- Commercial: yes; ad-supported
- Registration: Required only on forums

BabyZone.com was a website for mothers and mothers-to-be. It offered information on the full pregnancy timeline, from "trying to conceive", through pregnancy, childbirth, and raising an infant.

BabyZone.com was owned and operated by The Walt Disney Company, specifically by the Disney Interactive Family business unit within Disney Interactive. Other sites in the Disney Interactive Family group include Spoonful.com and Babble.com.

Disney acquired BabyZone from Kaboose in April 2009.

Disney shut down BabyZone in 2014.
