= Spoonful.com =

Former website

- Website type: Reference pages
- Owner: The Walt Disney Company
- Website: Spoonful.com
- Commercial: yes; ad-supported
- Registration: Required only on forums

Spoonful.com was a website for parents, predominantly featuring crafts to make with children, recipes, and children's activities, with the slogan "make. every day." The site debuted in April 2012. The site operated previously as FamilyFun, where for years it had earned a reputation as a top site for educators, DIY, and parents.

Spoonful.com is owned and operated by The Walt Disney Company, specifically by the Disney Interactive Family business unit within Disney Interactive. Other sites in the Disney Interactive Family group include Babble.com, DisneyBaby.com and BabyZone.com.

In February 2013 a partnership between Spoonful.com and Evite was announced in which Disney themed online party invitations would be made available on Evite.

In April 2013 Disney Interactive announced a new website section, created in partnership with Lilly Diabetes, with resources dedicated to helping families raising children with type 1 diabetes.

As of September 29, 2014, Spoonful.com closed.
