= Danishka Esterhazy =

Canadian screenwriter and film director

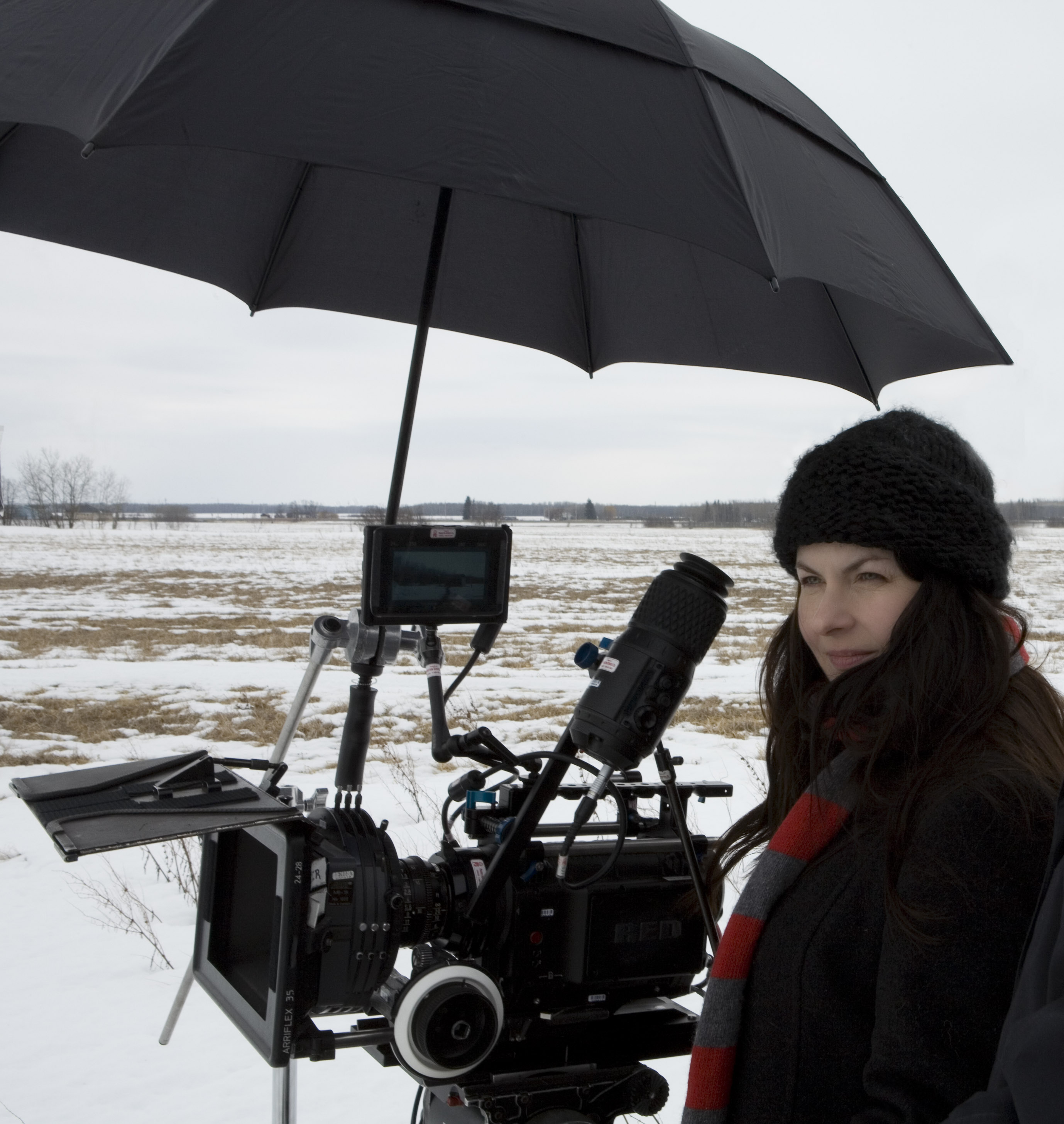
- Born: 1979 (age 46–47); Winnipeg, Manitoba, Canada
- Occupations: Writer, director
- Known for: Black Field
- Website: danishkaesterhazy.com

Danishka Esterhazy is a Canadian screenwriter and film director. She is best known for her thriller and horror movies, such as Black Field (2009), Level 16 (2018), The Banana Splits Movie (2019), and the Slumber Party Massacre (2021) remake.

== Career ==
Esterhazy is well known for her haunting stories and female-driven films. Her debut feature, Black Field, won the Best Feature Drama award at Vancouver's Women in Film Festival and the Best Canadian Feature award at Toronto's Female Eye Film Festival.

Esterhazy's films have screened in festivals and theaters and around the world including the Rome International Film Festival, the Puchon International Film Festival in South Korea, the Short Film Festival of India, La Maison Rouge in Paris and Kölner Filmhaus in Germany.

Her films have been broadcast on CBC Television, Bravo and Super Channel. Danishka is also a recipient of the Kodak New Vision Award for Most Promising Female Canadian Director awarded by Women in Film and Television Toronto. She also won the UBC Creative Writing Award for Best Screenplay at the 2015 Vancouver International Women in Film Festival.

She won the Canadian Screen Award for Best Direction in a TV Movie at the 10th Canadian Screen Awards in 2022, for I Was Lorena Bobbitt.

== Education ==
Esterhazy graduated from the Canadian Film Centre and the National Screen Institute.

== Filmography ==
Short film

Year	Title	Director	Writer	Producer	Editor	DoP
2002	Embowered	Yes	No	Yes	No	Yes
2004	Threefold	Yes	Yes	Yes	Yes	No
2005	The Snow Queen	Yes	Yes	No	No	No
2006	Protection	Yes	Yes	Yes	Yes	Yes
2009	The Red Hood	Yes	Yes	No	No	No
2009	Infectious	Yes	Yes	Yes	No	No
2012	Fallen	Yes	Yes	Yes	Yes	No

Feature film

Year	Title	Director	Writer	Producer
2003	Endings	Yes	No	No
2009	Black Field	Yes	Yes	No
2010	Suddenly Ever After	Yes	No	No
2011	The Trials of Rasputin	Yes	No	No
2013	H and G	Yes	Yes	Yes
2018	Level 16	Yes	Yes	No
2019	The Banana Splits Movie	Yes	No	No
2021	Slumber Party Massacre	Yes	No	Executive
2024	Killer Body Count	Yes	No	No
2025	Sniper: The Last Stand	Yes	No	No
2025	Match	Yes	No	No
2027	Remember Me	Yes	No	No

Television

Year	Title	Director	Executive Producer	Notes
2001	Bullies – Not Cool!	Yes	No	Also editor
2011	Where the Funny Comes From	Yes	No	
2020	Vagrant Queen	Yes	No	Episodes "Nobody's Queen" and "In a Sticky Spot"
2020	I Was Lorena Bobbitt	Yes	No	TV movie
2021–present	SurrealEstate	Yes	Yes	Directed 5 episodes
2022	Astrid & Lilly Save the World	No	Yes	
2023	Ginny & Georgia	Yes	No	2 episodes

== Awards ==
Year	Nominee / work	Award	Result
2010	Female Eye Film Festival	Best Canadian Feature for: Black Field	Won
2013	Women in Film and Television International	Most Promising Female Canadian Director	Won
