= Nikki Roumel =

Canadian actress

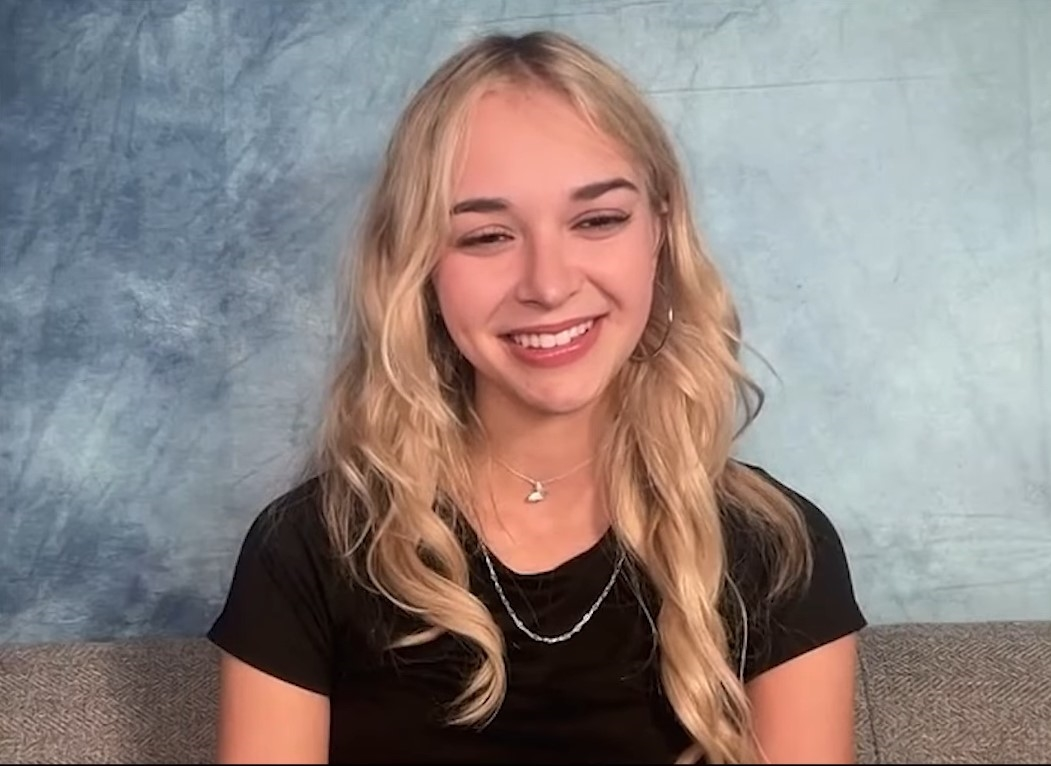
- Born: Nikola Roumeliotis; May 8, 2000 (age 26); Guelph, Ontario, Canada
- Occupation: Actress
- Years active: 2013–present
- Known for: Ginny & Georgia (as teenage Georgia Miller)

Nikola Roumeliotis (born May 8, 2000) known professionally as Nikki Roumel, is a Canadian actress, best known for portraying the teenage Georgia Miller in the Netflix series Ginny & Georgia. In 2018, Roumel received a Joey Award for Best Actress in a Principal Role in a Television Series for her performance in Designated Survivor.

== Early life ==
Roumel was born on 8 May 2000 in Guelph, Ontario, Canada. She comes from a Greek family living in Canada. She developed an interest in the performing arts at an early age, participating in local school theater shows and stage work before advancing to perform in front of the camera. She went to John F. Ross Collegiate Vocational Institute in Guelph, Ontario, where she developed her acting talent alongside academic studies.

== Career ==
Roumel made her screen debut in the short film Anaphylaction (2013) and later appeared in the television series Designated Survivor and Holly Hobbie. For her role in Designated Survivor, she received the Joey Award in 2018 for Best Actress in a Principal Role in a Television Series. In 2021 she was cast as the younger Georgia Miller in Ginny & Georgia, appearing in flashbacks across the series and You Don't Belong Here (2024). In August 2024, she was cast in the film Our Family Pride as Bri Williams, appearing alongside Ethan Cutkosky and Lev Cameron.

== Personal life ==
Roumel has participated in interviews and features discussing mental health topics.

== Filmography ==
Key
†	Denotes projects that have not yet been released

=== Film ===
Year	Title	Role	Notes	Ref.
2013	Anaphylaction	Kendra	Short film	
2024	This Too Shall Pass	Shelly		
2025	Dateless to Dangerous: My Son's Secret Life	Hayley Miller	Television film	
2026	Our Family Pride	Bri Williams		
TBA	You Don't Belong Here †	Maven	Post-production	
TBA	Jesus Land †	Jolene	Post-production	

=== Television ===
Year	Title	Character	Notes
2015	Paranormal Witness	Amber	1 episode
2017	Designated Survivor	Sibyl Sadik	Episode: "Family ties"
2018	Holly Hobbie	Cheer Capitan	1 episode
2021- present	Ginny & Georgia	Teenage Georgia Miller / Mary Atkins / Mary Rose Reilly / Georgia Warren / Georgia Greene	Main role; 27 episodes
