= Black Field (2009 Greek film) =

- Directed by: Vardis Marinakis
- Written by: Vardis Marinakis
- Starring: Christos Passalis; Sofia Georgovassili
- Cinematography: Marcus Waterloo
- Edited by: Yannis Chalkiadakis
- Release date: November 5, 2009
- Running time: 104 minutes
- Country: Greece
- Language: Greek

Black Field (Greek: Μαύρο Λιβάδι) is a 2009 Greek film, directed by Vardis Marinakis. The film released in 2009 and it stars Sofia Georgovassili and Christos Passalis. It won one award in Hellenic Film Academy Awards in category Best Cinematography. The film also won accolades in Mumbai International Film Festival and Seville European Film Festival. The film is shot in the places of Epirus and Thessaly.

== Plot ==
In 1654 in Greece under Ottoman rule, a solitary janissary collapses from his wounds outside an isolated Orthodox monastery for women. The nuns take him in and one with medical skills, Areti, tends him with the help of another, the young and shy Anthi. Both are fascinated by the presence of a man and, as he recovers, Areti starts an affair with him while Anthi has conflicting emotions. Learning that he is a deserter with a price on his head, the nuns realise that they dare not hide him and inform the authorities. As a contingent of soldiers arrives to collect him, Anthi escapes with him and the two go on the run. In the woods, a dark secret comes out. Anthi is in fact a boy, who was hidden in the monastery to avoid the devsirme, the kidnapping of Orthodox children by the Ottomans as recruits for the army. Initially disgusted, the soldier slowly builds up a comradeship with the gauche lad but one day they are recaptured. Anthi is taken back to the monastery, where Areti is pregnant and hangs herself in despair. Anthi runs away and rejoins the janissary, who has killed his captors. The two go off into the woods again.

== Cast ==
- Christos Passalis
- Sofia Georgovassili
- Despina Bebedelli
- Maria Panouria
- Despina Kourti
- Evangelia Andreadaki

== Awards ==
List of awards and nominations
Award	Category	Recipients and nominees	Result
2010 Hellenic Film Academy Awards	Best Cinematography	Marcus Waterloo	Won
2010 Mumbai International Film Festival	Silver Gateway Trophy	Vardis Marinakis	Won
