= Maria Sten =

Danish actress and filmmaker (born 1990)

- Born: 29 October 1989 (age 36); Copenhagen, Denmark
- Other name: Maria Sten-Knudsen
- Occupations: Actress, filmmaker, writer
- Height: 5 ft 10 in (178 cm)
- Parent: Nina Sten-Knudsen (mother)
- Beauty pageant titleholder
- Title: Miss Denmark
- Hair color: Black
- Eye color: Brown
- Major competitions: Miss Denmark Universe 2008 (winner); Miss Supertalent of the World 2011 (top 7)

Maria Sten (born 29 October 1989) is a Danish actress, writer, director and beauty pageant titleholder. She was crowned Miss Denmark Universe 2008 and represented her country at Miss Universe 2008. She portrays Frances Neagley in the Prime Video action series Reacher (2022) and spin-off series Neagley (2026).

== Childhood ==
Sten was born in Copenhagen, Denmark to Danish painter Nina Sten-Knudsen with Swedish heritage and a Congolese father. She has eight siblings: one brother, four sisters, two step-sisters and one unrelated sister. She grew up with only one of the sisters, an older sister who was her mother’s only other child.

As a child, Sten often posed for her mother's art and, as a child, she also started doing theater in school; participating in a youth acting program at Scandinavian Theater School. Her other childhood activities included horseback riding, gymnastics, kickboxing, track and field and playing the piano.

As she grew older, she grew taller and was convinced to try modeling. Sten moved to New York City in the United States when she was 18 years old to pursue a career in Performing Arts.

== Career ==
Sten competed in Miss Supertalent of the World 2011 and was placed in the top seven women among 50 candidates.

=== Writer ===
In February 2017, Sten's submission "The Courier" was announced as a finalist for the second annual television writing program from the ATX Television Festival and The Black List. Later in 2017, Sten was selected for the 2017 Black List x WIF Episodic Lab. Sten has also written two episodes of David E. Kelley's series Big Sky, and wrote, directed, and produced the short films Wild Things Run Free and When It Burns. In 2018 Sten was named to the Tracking Board's Young & Hungry List, which showcases the top 100 new writers as voted on by Hollywood's most influential.

=== Actor ===
As an actor, Sten played the lead role of Jillian Hope Hodgson in the fourth season of the television show Channel Zero: The Dream Door. She portrayed Liz Tremayne in the DC Universe television series Swamp Thing, which also starred Crystal Reed.

Since 2022, she has starred as the character Frances Neagley in the Amazon Prime Video series Reacher and 2026 spin-off series Neagley.

== Filmography ==
=== Film ===
Year	Title	Role	Notes
2014	I'm Good	Kia	Short film
2015	Straight Outta Compton	Girlfriend	Uncredited
2015	Mellow Peaches		Short film
2015	The Comments	Woman in Pool	Short film
2015	Dream...	The Boss	Short film
2016	When It Burns	Kate	Short film; also Director, executive producer and writer
2016	Kessi Blue	Robin C.	Short film; also Line producer
2017	Wild Things Run Free	The Woman	Short film; also Director, producer and writer
2017	Book Trader	Cassandra	Short film
2019	Emmanuel and Me	Christina	

=== Television ===
Year	Title	Role	Notes
2012	The Doctors	Woman in Bedroom	Episode: "Secrets to Look & Feel Better Naked"; as Maria Sten-Knudsen
2012	Eros.Emmanuel and Me	Christina	Television mini-series
2014	Celebrity Crime Files	Angela Davis	Episode: "The Black Panthers"
2014	Out the Box	Maria	Episode: "These Hands"
2018	Channel Zero: The Dream Door	Jillian Hope Hodgson	Main role; 6 episodes
2019	Swamp Thing	Liz Tremayne	Main role; 10 episodes
2021	Big Sky	—	Writer; Episode: "The Wolves Are Always Out for Blood"
2022–2025	Reacher	Frances Neagley	Main role; 17 episodes
2026	Neagley	Frances Neagley	Title role; 8 episodes

=== Web ===
Year	Title	Role	Notes
2015	Persuasion	Terry	Main role; 9 episodes
2022	Narcissa	Andie	Main role; 8 episodes

=== Producer ===
Year	Title	Notes
2015	In the Still of the Night	Short film
