= Sam Hill (director) =

American television director and producer

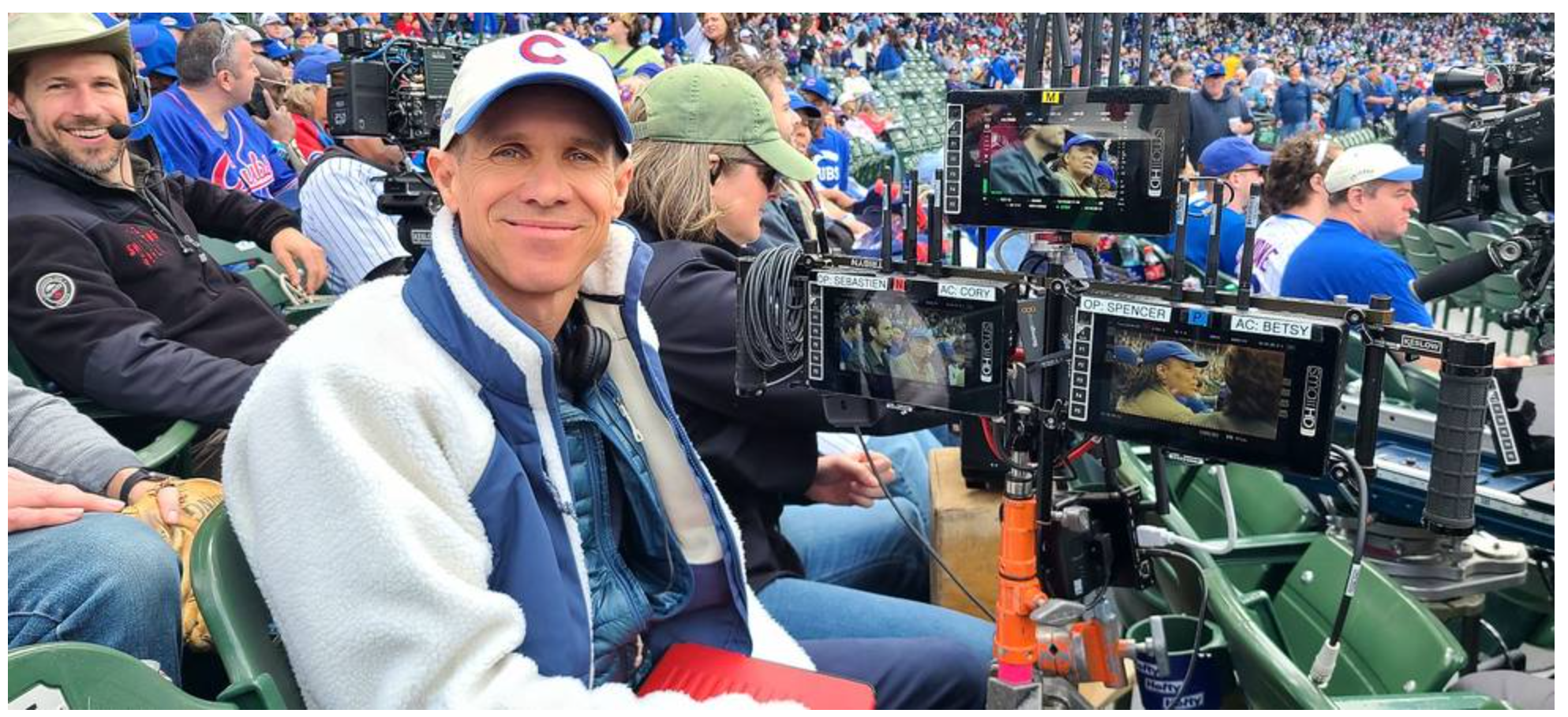
- Hill on the set of Neagley in 2025
- Occupations: Television director, television producer
- Years active: 1991–present

Sam Hill is an American television director and television producer. He is best known for his directing and producing work on the television series CSI: Miami and the Amazon Prime Video series Reacher. His other directing credits include CSI: NY, Cult, Body of Proof, Almost Human, Believe, Forever and Scorpion.

Prior to working in television, Hill worked as a first assistant director, most notably on the films Cruel Intentions (1999), Cruel Intentions 2 (2001) and The Sweetest Thing (2002), all of which were directed by Roger Kumble.
