= Black Field (2009 Canadian film) =

Historical drama film

- Directed by: Danishka Esterhazy
- Written by: Danishka Esterhazy
- Produced by: Jeff Skinner; Kent Ulrich; David Antoniuk; Ashley Hirt; Polly Washburn
- Starring: Sara Canning; Darcy Fehr; Mathieu Bourguet; Ferron Guerreiro
- Cinematography: Paul Suderman
- Edited by: Joni Church
- Music by: Joe Silva
- Production company: Two Lagoons Productions
- Distributed by: Super Channel
- Release date: October 13, 2009
- Country: Canada
- Language: English

Black Field is a 2009 Canadian historical drama film and the debut of filmmaker Danishka Esterhazy. It is set in the 1870s and tells the story of a love triangle between a man and two sisters Maggie (Sara Canning) and Rose McGregor (Ferron Guerreiro).

== Premise ==
Black Field is an historical drama set in the 1870s that tells of a love triangle about two British sisters Maggie (Sara Canning) and Rose McGregor (Ferron Guerreiro) and the man that comes between them.

== Cast ==
- Sara Canning as Maggie McGregor
- Darcy Fehr as Anderson
- Mathieu Bourguet as David Latouche
- Ferron Guerreiro as Rose McGregor
- Adriana O'Neil as Mrs Kravchenko
- Robert Huculak as Mr Kravchenko
- Jefferson Bruyere as Native Trapper

== Production ==
Black Field began principal filming on April 27, 2009, in Manitoba with development support from Canada's Super Channel.

== Reception ==
Of its filming, Aaron Graham of Uptown wrote "writer/director Danishka Esterhazy's feature-length debut, Black Field, is shaping up to be a striking period piece". Reel West magazine gave the cover spot and presented a featured article on Black Field. After its premiere at the Vancouver International Film Festival, Marina Antunes of Row Three wrote "The film is notable for both its visuals and Canning's performance but also for its score..'" and summarized "Black Field is a gorgeous film which delivers a remarkable story of survival".
