= Rashomama =

Rashomama may refer to:

- An episode of CSI: Crime Scene Investigation
- An episode of Mama's Family

== See also ==
- Rashomon
