= List of Mama's Family episodes =

Episodes of the American sitcom

Below is a list of episodes for the 1980s television sitcom Mama's Family.

== Series overview ==
Season	Episodes	First aired	Last aired	Network
1	13	January 22, 1983	May 7, 1983	NBC
2	22	September 29, 1983	April 7, 1984	NBC
3	25	September 27, 1986	March 28, 1987	Syndicated
4	25	September 26, 1987	March 26, 1988	Syndicated
5	25	November 5, 1988	May 27, 1989	Syndicated
6	20	September 23, 1989	February 24, 1990	Syndicated

== NBC Ratings ==
Season	Episodes	Start date	End date	Nielsen rank	Nielsen rating
1982–83	13	January 22, 1983	May 7, 1983	59	N/A
1983–84	22	September 29, 1983	April 7, 1984	66	13.6 (Note: Tied with The Mississippi and Automan)

== Episodes ==
=== Season 1 (1983) ===
No. overall	No. in season	Title	Directed by	Written by	Original release date	Prod. code
1	1	"Vint and the Kids Move In"	Roger Beatty, Harvey Korman	Dick Clair, Jenna McMahon	January 22, 1983	7004
Vinton Harper, Mama's only son, drops by to announce that he and his children, Buzz and Sonja, have been evicted from their house. He is hoping they can stay with Mama until he gets back on his feet. Against the wishes of her sister and roommate Fran, Mama agrees. Vinton is also reunited with Naomi Oates, his high-school crush and Mama's next-door neighbor.
2	2	"For Better or for Worse"	Roger Beatty, Harvey Korman	Rick Hawkins, Liz Sage	January 29, 1983	7005
Mama becomes overcome with anger after Vint and Naomi spend the night together and she learns that they plan to marry, move to Arizona, and run a trailer park.
3	3	"The Wedding: Part 1"	Roger Beatty, Harvey Korman	Rick Hawkins, Liz Sage	February 5, 1983	7006
Mama's daughter Eunice overhears her sister Ellen, Mama, and Fran gossip about how having her sing at Vint's wedding would ruin the ceremony. In revenge, Eunice tells Ellen a secret about her husband that the others knew all along.
4	4	"The Wedding: Part 2"	Roger Beatty, Harvey Korman	Jim Evering, Dorothy Van	February 12, 1983	7007
Vint and Naomi's wedding takes place, but upon discovering that their business deal was a scam that cost them all their money, the family returns to live in Mama's house. Note: This is the only NBC episode in which the entire cast appears together.
5	5	"Family Feud"	Roger Beatty, Harvey Korman	Gene Perret	February 19, 1983	7013
Vint takes the family on the game show Family Feud (with Richard Dawson), so they can attempt to win $10,000. Notes: This is the first time Mama would appear on a game show; she will later appear on Jeopardy! in a Season 4 episode. Betty White and Richard Dawson both appeared together on the game show Match Game. Rue McClanahan and Karin Argoud do not appear in this episode.
6	6	"Cellmates"	Roger Beatty, Harvey Korman	Dick Clair, Jenna McMahon	February 26, 1983	7008
Mama, Vint and Ed throw Eunice a surprise birthday party at the Bigger Jigger, but a ruckus ensues causing Eunice and Mama to be arrested and spend the evening in a jail cell. Notes: The picture of Eunice's high-school crush, Duke Reeves, is actually executive producer Joe Hamilton, Carol Burnett's husband at the time. Dorothy Lyman, Rue McClanahan, Eric Brown, and Karin Argoud do not appear in this episode.
7	7	"Mama Gets a Job"	Roger Beatty, Harvey Korman	S : Don Emerson King; T : Gene Perret	March 5, 1983	7012
After learning that Aunt Effie has gotten a job as a filing clerk at the courthouse, Mama gets a job and must juggle learning how to use an office phone, dealing with customers, and being interrupted by phone calls from her over-dependent relatives. Note: Rue McClanahan does not appear in this episode.
8	8	"Double Standard"	Roger Beatty, Harvey Korman	Rich Orloff	March 12, 1983	7011
Buzz and Sonja are getting ready for their high school's Homecoming dance, but Vint gives the younger Buzz a later curfew because he is a boy. Note: This is the first of two appearances for Sonja's on-again/off-again boyfriend Michael. He also appears in "A Grave Mistake," the final NBC episode. Rue McClanahan does not appear in this episode.
9	9	"Mama's Boyfriend"	Roger Beatty, Harvey Korman	Gary Jacobs	March 19, 1983	7010
Mama has a date with her old beau Woody, whom she has not seen in 40 years, and they decide to spend the weekend together out of town against her family's wishes. Note: Dorothy Lyman does not appear in this episode.
10	10	"Fran's Dress"	Roger Beatty & Harvey Korman	Jerry Ross, Jim Evering, Dorothy Van	March 26, 1983	7003
Mama accidentally scorches the dress Fran is to wear at an awards banquet that evening, and she and Ellen must race to find a replacement before Fran returns home. Note: Dorothy Lyman and Karin Argoud do not appear in this episode.
11	11	"Alien Marriage"	Roger Beatty	Jim Evering, Dorothy Van	April 2, 1983	7002
In this flashback episode set prior to marrying Naomi, Vint's shady friend Claude Canemaker offers him $1600 to marry a girl from Portugal so she can stay in the country. Mama decides she must break up the wedding after her neighbor Naomi informs her that it's illegal.
12	12	"Positive Thinking"	Roger Beatty, Harvey Korman	S : Jim Evering, Dorothy Van; T : Dick Clair, Jenna McMahon	April 30, 1983	7009
Eunice starts listening to a positive-thinking tape and her outlook is transformed into newfound optimism and self-confidence, but her cheeriness quickly fades as she is pushed around by the people in her life. Note: This was Harvey Korman's final appearance as Ed Higgins, although he continued to play host Alistair Quince at the opening of the show through the end of Season 2. These openings were edited out when the show was put into syndication.
13	13	"Mama's Silver"	Roger Beatty, Harvey Korman	S : Rick Hawkins, Liz Sage; T : Dick Clair, Jenna McMahon	May 7, 1983	7001
In another flashback episode, Vinton gets a call from his ne'er-do-well friend Claude Canemaker, who needs $250 to post bail, and Vint secretly pawns Mama's silver when no one will lend him the money. Note: Dorothy Lyman does not appear in this episode.

=== Season 2 (1983–84) ===
No. overall	No. in season	Title	Directed by	Written by	Original release date	Prod. code
14	1	"Flaming Forties"	Roger Beatty, Harvey Korman	Jim Evering, Dorothy Van	September 29, 1983	210
Buzz and Sonja organize a dance to raise money for a gymnasium, but when the band gets arrested before the dance, Mama steps in to save the day.
15	2	"The Return of Leonard Oates"	Roger Beatty, Harvey Korman	Rick Hawkins, Liz Sage	October 13, 1983	203
Naomi's second husband, Leonard Oates (Jerry Reed), returns to town wealthy, wanting to take Naomi away with him to Florida.
16	3	"Country Club"	Roger Beatty, Harvey Korman	Gene Perret	October 20, 1983	204
When Ellen is awarded Raytown's "Woman of the Year" at the Raytown Country Club, Mayor Tutweiler invites her family to the ceremony, where their crude behavior embarrasses her. Note: Rue McClanahan, Eric Brown, and Karin Argoud do not appear in this episode.
17	4	"Naomi and the Stork"	Roger Beatty, Harvey Korman	Katherine Green	October 27, 1983	209
Naomi is ailing and all signs point to her being pregnant, causing friction in the household as no one wants to give up their room for the new baby.
18	5	"Rashomama"	Roger Beatty, Dick Martin	Jim Evering, Dorothy Van, Rick Hawkins, Liz Sage	November 3, 1983	206
Mama is in the hospital, having been hit on the head with a stew pot. In flashbacks, Naomi, Ellen, and Eunice each tell Vint a different account of how it happened. Notes: This was Carol Burnett's final physical appearance in the series, although in "Mama's Birthday", Burnett can be heard singing "Happy Birthday" to Mama on the telephone. Rue McClanahan, Eric Brown, and Karin Argoud do not appear in this episode.
19	6	"Obscene Call"	Roger Beatty, Harvey Korman	Roger Beatty	November 10, 1983	211
After Naomi starts receiving obscene telephone calls, Mama, Fran and Vint initially suggest it is Naomi's fault because of her clothes and personality, but they quickly realize how indiscriminate the caller is while Naomi is away. Note: For the Time Life DVD release, "On the Road Again" by Willie Nelson was replaced with royalty-free music. The 2019 Warner Bros. DVD release restores the original music.
20	7	"Ellen's Boyfriend"	Roger Beatty, Harvey Korman	Jim Parker	November 17, 1983	212
Ellen starts dating a much-younger man named Glen and hides him from her family because of the age difference. Meanwhile, Vinton wins a dinner for four...at the restaurant where Ellen and Glen are dining that evening. Note: For the Time Life DVD release, "The Second Time Around" was replaced with royalty-free music. The 2019 Warner Bros. DVD release restores the original music.
21	8	"Aunt Gert Rides Again"	Roger Beatty, Dick Martin	Philip Jayson Lasker, Gene Perret	December 1, 1983	208
Mama's cousin Gert (Imogene Coca), once a spirited and vivacious woman, is now in a nursing home that has left her sedate and lifeless. Mama attempts to reinvigorate her and the fellow residents at Gert's birthday party. Notes: For the Time Life DVD release, "Chariots of Fire" by Vangelis was replaced with royalty-free music and "Ain't Misbehavin'" was edited out. The 2019 Warner Bros. DVD release restores the original music. Eric Brown and Karin Argoud do not appear in this episode.
22	9	"Amateur Night"	Roger Beatty, Dick Martin	Jim Evering, Dorothy Van	December 8, 1983	207
Mama, Fran, and Naomi persuade Vint to enter a talent contest at the Bigger Jigger. His popularity causes his ego to grow exponentially, offending his family in the process.
23	10	"The Mama Who Came to Dinner"	Roger Beatty, Harvey Korman	Rick Hawkins, Liz Sage	December 22, 1983	202
Vint and Naomi invite their friends over for a dinner party while the rest of the family goes out, but before the guests arrive, Mama's back goes out on the living room floor.
24	11	"Mama Learns to Drive"	Roger Beatty, Harvey Korman	Rick Hawkins, Liz Sage	January 7, 1984	215
The family attempts to teach Mama to drive, but all attempts fail due to her attitude. However, when she gets a call from a department store informing her that an item she placed on hold would be sold, Mama quickly changes her attitude.
25	12	"Black Belt Mama"	Roger Beatty, Harvey Korman	Jim Evering, Dorothy Van	January 14, 1984	216
Naomi is taking a self-defense class, and she talks Fran and Sonja into going. After Mama is mugged by a purse-snatcher, she decides to join, too.
26	13	"Mama Buys a Car"	Roger Beatty, Harvey Korman	Philip Jayson Lasker	January 21, 1984	217
Mama buys a used car from shifty Willie Potts (Fred Willard), a childhood friend of Vint's. Unfortunately, the car turns out to be a self-destructing lemon, and Mama must fight for a refund from the sleazy car dealer.
27	14	"Supermarket"	Roger Beatty, Harvey Korman	Gene Perret	February 4, 1984	218
After Mama causes a ruckus at the Food Circus where Naomi works, the manager offers her a job as a customer consultant, stationed beside Naomi's checkout counter. Note: Rue McClanahan does not appear in this episode.
28	15	"No Room at the Inn"	Roger Beatty, Harvey Korman	Katherine Green	February 11, 1984	219
For their first wedding anniversary, Vint reserves a room at an out-of-town adult motel for two days and one night. However, when Mama's visit to Aunt Effie is cut short, Vint and Naomi's room in the sold-out motel is the only place where she can stay.
29	16	"Mama for Mayor: Part 1"	Roger Beatty, Harvey Korman	Gene Perret	February 18, 1984	220
When Mama ridicules Mayor Tutweiler at a re-election press conference at her house, he challenges her to run against him. This leads to tireless campaigning, a debate, and Ellen's attempts to stop Mama from running for office. Note: For the Time Life DVD release, "Moonlight Becomes You" and Mama's campaign song "Harper Days Are Here Again" were edited out. The 2019 Warner Bros. DVD release restores the original music.
30	17	"Mama for Mayor: Part 2"	Roger Beatty, Harvey Korman	Fred Rubin	February 25, 1984	221
After winning the office of mayor, Mama soon discovers that she is not prepared for the job as the entire town turns against her. Note: For the Time Life DVD release, Mama's campaign song "Harper Days Are Here Again" was edited out. The 2019 Warner Bros. DVD release restores the original music.
31	18	"Harper Versus Harper"	Roger Beatty, Harvey Korman	Elaine Newman, Ed Burnham	March 10, 1984	213
Mama unknowingly runs over Naomi's misplaced keychain while vacuuming her living-room rug with Naomi's new vacuum cleaner, ruining both the vacuum cleaner and her rug. Neither woman admits fault, so they decide to settle their fight in small-claims court.
32	19	"Mama's Birthday"	Roger Beatty, Harvey Korman	Jim Evering, Dorothy Van	March 17, 1984	214
All Mama wants for her birthday is for someone to help her clean out the attic, so Buzz helps her. While they work, he asks her to tell him about her 30th birthday party. In a flashback, she recalls how everything went wrong that day. Note: Although she does not appear on camera, Carol Burnett, as Eunice, can be heard singing "Happy Birthday" to Thelma over the phone. This was Burnett's final appearance in the series, although the character of Eunice would be voiced by Phyllis Franklin in the Season Four episode "Pomp and Circumstance."
33	20	"Mama Cries Uncle"	Roger Beatty, Harvey Korman	Rick Hawkins, Liz Sage	March 24, 1984	222
Mama's brother-in-law Roy Harper shows up and charms the entire family except for Mama, who has mixed feelings about him. Guest Star: Murray Hamilton as Roy Harper. Note: Murray Hamilton would later appear on The Golden Girls with Betty White and Rue McClanahan as Blanche's (McClanahan's) father, Big Daddy Hollingsworth. Rue McClanahan does not appear in this episode.
34	21	"Ask Aunt Fran"	Roger Beatty, Harvey Korman	Jim Evering, Dorothy Van	March 31, 1984	205
Fran gets a job as an advice columnist but does not know what to say until Mama gives her the answers.
35	22	"A Grave Mistake"	Roger Beatty, Harvey Korman	Gene Perret	April 7, 1984	201
When Mama visits Carl's grave, she is upset to discover that another woman is buried next to him in Mama's reserved plot. Note: This episode marked the final appearances of Rue McClanahan, Eric Brown, and Karin Argoud in the series.

=== Season 3 (1986–87) ===
No. overall	No. in season	Title	Directed by	Written by	Original release date	Prod. code
36	1	"Farewell, Frannie"	Dave Powers	Rick Hawkins	September 27, 1986	302
Two years after the final NBC show, Fran has just died of "natural causes" and Mama is determined to give her late sister something she never had: a "perfect day", but one disaster after another strikes. Adding to the aggravation, Mama's grandson Bubba is unexpectedly released from Juvenile Hall into her guardianship. Note: This episode marked the introduction of Beverly Archer and Allan Kayser as series regulars. This also was the last mention of Buzz and Sonja in the series. The picture used for Fran's memorial was the same one used for Rue McClanahan's opening credit during Season 2.
37	2	"Where There's a Will"	Dave Powers	Shelley Ross, Kerry Millerick	October 4, 1986	303
The executor of Fran's will informs the family that Fran was worth $35,000. However, in order to receive the money, Fran's will stipulates that Mama must not lose her temper for a period of two weeks. Note: Beverly Archer does not appear in this episode.
38	3	"Best Medicine"	Dave Powers	Rick Hawkins	October 11, 1986	305
Ellen stops by with a gift for Mama and attempts to apologize for missing Aunt Fran's funeral; Mama refuses to forgive her and throws her out. Later, Mama learns that Ellen is in the hospital. Note: This was Betty White's final appearance in the series, although the Ellen character is mentioned several times throughout the remainder of the series and is presumed to still be living in Raytown. This is also the last time that Betty White would be credited as a special guest star in the opening credits.
39	4	"National Mama"	Dave Powers	Jim Evering	October 18, 1986	304
When Mama's dreams start providing the names of winning horses, the family figures they're in the money. Note: Beverly Archer does not appear in this episode.
40	5	"Soup to Nuts"	Dave Powers	M.J. Cody, Chuck Bulot	October 25, 1986	301
Mama, Iola, and Naomi decide to have a chili cook-off (with Vint as judge), with the winner getting her recipe in the church-bazaar cookbook. Note: This was the first syndicated episode filmed, but was held back for airing.
41	6	"Mama and Dr. Brothers"	Dave Powers	Ann Elder, Tom Perew	November 1, 1986	309
Vint and Naomi are having trouble in the bedroom, and special guest Dr. Joyce Brothers takes Naomi's desperate phone call live on the air of the local TV station, prompting chaos in Mama's house.
42	7	"Cat's Meow"	Dave Powers	Dorothy Van	November 8, 1986	307
Iola is distraught when her cat dies, although everyone else is thankful. However, she refuses to let go and nothing can console her - until she decides to have the cat freeze-dried.
43	8	"The Love Letter"	Dave Powers	Jim Evering	November 15, 1986	311
After Naomi learns from a magazine quiz that Vint is "unromantic," Bubba writes a love letter for Vint to give to Naomi. However, a series of misunderstandings leads Naomi to believe the letter is from Bubba, and also leads Mama and Iola to believe that the letter was meant for them.
44	9	"An Ill Wind"	Dave Powers	Rick Hawkins	November 22, 1986	308
In this Thanksgiving episode, Mama, Bubba, Vint, Naomi, Iola, and Aunt Effie (Dorothy Van) all take cover in the basement when an unexpected tornado heads for Raytown.
45	10	"Steal One, Pearl Two"	Dave Powers	M.J. Cody, Chuck Bulot	November 29, 1986	310
After Iola loses her string of pearls, she is quick to accuse Bubba, who comes home with a brand-new drum set.
46	11	"Where There's Smoke"	Dave Powers	Rick Hawkins	December 6, 1986	313
When Mama makes a bid to be President of the Church Ladies' League, she decides that she must charm Reverend Meechum and his critical wife Alberta by inviting them to dinner. However, she must make room for an uninvited guest when an escapee from juvenile hall suddenly shows up looking for Bubba. Guest Yeardley Smith. Note: Beverly Archer does not appear in this episode.
47	12	"Fly Naomi"	Dave Powers	Sara V. Finney, Vida Spears	December 13, 1986	306
Unhappy with the rut she's gotten into, Naomi decides to attend school to train as a flight attendant, much to the famiy's chagrin.
48	13	"Santa Mama"	Dave Powers	Jim Evering	December 20, 1986	316
Mama's holiday depression affects the family, and Vint is asked to portray Santa Claus at the mall on Christmas Eve. However, Vint loses his voice and a reluctant Mama must fill in for him.
49	14	"Desperately Seeking Anyone"	Dave Powers	Neil Lebowitz	January 10, 1987	314
Mama and Naomi's plan to find a date for Iola backfires when the date is more interested in Mama.
50	15	"Porn Again"	Dave Powers	Ann Elder, Tom Perew	January 17, 1987	315
When Mama finds a pornographic magazine under Bubba's bed, she is shocked to learn that Naomi accidentally sold it to him. This causes her to form a coalition called MOP (Mothers Opposing Pornography), and lead a boycott of Food Circus.
51	16	"Have It Mama's Way"	Dave Powers	Rick Hawkins	January 24, 1987	317
When Mama tries to raise money for a trip to Hawaii, the manager of a local burger joint that Bubba has applied to offers Mama a job as well.
52	17	"Birthright"	Dave Powers	Dorothy Van	January 31, 1987	318
An anonymous letter convinces Vint that he's adopted, so he sets out to find his biological mother on Mother's Day.
53	18	"Grandma USA"	Dave Powers	Gene Perret	February 7, 1987	312
Mama is surprised to learn she was entered in the Grandma USA contest by Bubba. She is at first reluctant to compete, but changes her mind when she finds out the grand prize is a dream kitchen, complete with a self-cleaning oven. Note: For the Time Life DVD release, "Something" was replaced with royalty-free music. The 2019 Warner Bros. DVD release restores the original music.
54	19	"Buck Private Bubba"	Dave Powers	Neil Lebowitz	February 14, 1987	321
Vint's former Army Sergeant comes to town and recruits Bubba, who enlists after his girlfriend breaks up with him.
55	20	"Mama's Cousin"	Dave Powers	Rick Hawkins	February 21, 1987	320
Mama's worldly cousin (Vicki Lawrence in a dual role) annoys Mama but charms the family with her lifestyle and her never-ending stories. Note: Dorothy Lyman does not appear in this episode.
56	21	"Mama with the Golden Arm"	Dave Powers	Jim Evering	February 28, 1987	322
Mama emerges as a contender in an arm-wrestling competition and the entire family trains her for the championship event.
57	22	"It Takes Two to Watusi"	Dave Powers	M.J. Cody, Chuck Bulot	March 7, 1987	323
Naomi sets up her divorced best friend LuAnn Fayette for a double date with her and Vint, but when her date cancels, Naomi suggests to Mama's horror that Bubba could be a last-minute stand-in.
58	23	"Fangs a Lot, Mama"	Dave Powers	M.J. Cody, Chuck Bulot	March 14, 1987	319
After Vint is invited to join the Mystic Order of the Cobra, a local men's club, Mama attempts to sabotage his induction.
59	24	"The Best Policy"	Dave Powers	Jim Evering	March 21, 1987	325
After Vint announces that Naomi is the sole beneficiary of his life insurance policy, he starts having a series of near-fatal accidents, prompting suspicions by Mama and Iola.
60	25	"After the Fall"	Dave Powers	Rick Hawkins	March 28, 1987	324
After Aunt Effie falls off the roof of her house, Mama brings her to the house, determined to aid in her recovery. Meanwhile, Vint, Naomi, Bubba and Iola work together on a 2,000-piece puzzle.

=== Season 4 (1987–88) ===
No. overall	No. in season	Title	Directed by	Written by	Original release date	Prod. code
61	1	"Educating Mama"	Dave Powers	Neil Lebowitz	September 26, 1987	402
Mama and Bubba both begin night school: Bubba must attend in order to graduate, and Mama attends because she never got her diploma. However, the first assignment reminds Mama of the reason she dropped out of school in the first place.
62	2	"Zirconias Are a Girl's Best Friend"	Dave Powers	Rick Hawkins	October 3, 1987	401
When Mama becomes addicted to TV home shopping, her family must intervene when the credit-card bill arrives. Note: For the Time Life DVD release, "I Feel Pretty" was edited out. The 2019 Warner Bros. DVD release restores the original music.
63	3	"The Key to the Crime"	Dave Powers	Dorothy Van	October 10, 1987	404
A burglar known as the Courteous Crook is robbing and subsequently cleaning homes all over Raytown. When Vint is accused of being the Crook, Mama and Iola set out to find the real culprit.
64	4	"Breaking Up Is Hard to Do"	Dave Powers	Jim Evering	October 17, 1987	410
Vint and Naomi are separated, yet living in the same house and driving Mama crazy.
65	5	"A Big Hand for Mama"	Dave Powers	Jim Evering	October 24, 1987	406
After a brush with death involving lightning and the courthouse clock's minute hand, Mama has a cheerful, generous new outlook on life, and her family quickly takes advantage of it.
66	6	"Flounder's Day"	Dave Powers	Neil Lebowitz	October 31, 1987	409
After being unfairly beat out 50 years ago, Mama finally has a chance to sing in the annual Founder's Day festival when an audition is held to find a new singer of the town anthem "Raytown, O Raytown".
67	7	"Teacher's Pet"	Dave Powers	Rick Hawkins	November 7, 1987	407
Mama is smitten with her night-school teacher, but she does not know how to get his attention, so she turns to Iola and Naomi for help.
68	8	"Child's Play"	Dave Powers	Danny Kallis	November 14, 1987	408
Reverend and Mrs. Meechum ask Mama to look after their unruly grandson Eugene for the day. However, the little monster proves to be very difficult to handle, even for disciplinarian Mama.
69	9	"Mama Mania"	Dave Powers	Neil Lebowitz	November 21, 1987	416
Didi Mason, an old friend of Naomi's and a professional wrestler, talks Naomi into being a last-minute substitute for her ailing tag-team partner for a match, but it's up to Mama to step in when Didi is down for the count.
70	10	"Gift Horse"	Dave Powers	Daphne Pollon, David Castro	November 28, 1987	405
Mama has a yard sale and tries to sell off Iola's gaudy homemade gifts, hoping to raise the money to buy a VCR. They have the sale while Iola's out of town, but she comes back sooner than expected.
71	11	"Workman's Holiday"	Dave Powers	M.J. Cody, Chuck Bulot	December 5, 1987	413
When Mama embarrasses Vinton at work with the "Binky Bunny" lunchbox she made for him when he was a kid, she must find a way to cure him of his trauma before he loses his job.
72	12	"Mama Sees Red"	Dave Powers	Jim Geoghan	December 12, 1987	418
A man from the State Department asks the Harpers to host a Russian national named Olga for one day, as part of "Project Heartland."
73	13	"A Room with No View"	Dave Powers	M.J. Cody, Chuck Bulot	December 19, 1987	403
Vint and Naomi are tired of living in the basement, so they agree to switch rooms with Bubba. Everyone is happy with the new arrangement, except Mama.
74	14	"The Sins of the Mother"	Dave Powers	Jim Evering	January 9, 1988	420
When Bubba comes home from his friend's house drunk, Mama is enraged and gives him an excessive punishment. He (with the rest of the family) doesn't understand why she is being so irrational, until Iola explains (via flashback) about a similar incident involving his mother Eunice when she was Bubba's age, during an ill-fated Mother-Daughter banquet.
75	15	"A Friend Indeed"	Dave Powers	Dorothy Van	January 16, 1988	417
When Iola starts spending all her time with her new friend Arlene, the Harpers are relieved to be free of her, but Mama starts to get jealous of Iola's new friendship. Meanwhile, Vint, Naomi, and Bubba train for Raytown's 10K race.
76	16	"I Do, I Don't"	Dave Powers	Rick Hawkins	January 23, 1988	411
After attending a family wedding, Bubba, Mama, and Iola fantasize about what married life would be like with the objects of their affections.
77	17	"Mama Gets the Bird"	Dave Powers	Jim Evering	January 30, 1988	415
After Uncle Oscar passes away, Mama is willed his gabby pet parrot. When the bird starts reciting verses in rhyme, the family thinks they are clues that will lead them to Oscar's rumored hidden treasure.
78	18	"Mama's Girls"	Dave Powers	Rick Hawkins	February 6, 1988	414
Trying to get Aunt Effie to follow her doctor's advice and exercise leads Mama to start a senior-citizens' tap-dancing troupe.
79	19	"Mama on Jeopardy!"	Dave Powers	Neil Lebowitz	February 13, 1988	423
Mama finds herself competing on Jeopardy!. Alex Trebek appears as himself.
80	20	"Mama Goes Hawaiian: Part 1"	Dave Powers	Jim Evering	February 20, 1988	424
After winning a trip to Hawaii on Jeopardy!, Mama and her family go on the trip, along with Iola. Iola and Bubba each find romance, Mama is pestered by a man she believes is a beach bum, and Naomi is confined to the hotel room with a terrible sunburn.
81	21	"Mama Goes Hawaiian: Part 2"	Dave Powers	Rick Hawkins	February 27, 1988	425
Vint plays golf with three men who mistakenly believe that he is a stock-market insider, and Mama goes on the hunt for a special Hawaiian lamp, while doing her best to avoid the "beach bum" who has been following her around the island. Note: For the Time Life DVD release, the stock Hawaiian music when Mama goes searching for her aloha hula lamp was replaced with royalty-free music. The 2019 Warner Bros. DVD release restores the original music.
82	22	"Bubba's Double Date"	Dave Powers	M.J. Cody, Chuck Bulot	March 5, 1988	421
After Bubba's date for the prom cancels at the last minute to attend a fraternity party, Bubba cannot find anyone else to go with him, so Mama sets him up without his knowledge with Iola's nerdy niece Vernette.
83	23	"Bed and Breakdown"	Dave Powers	Jack Wohl, Phil Hahn	March 12, 1988	412
When Raytown is crowded due to the Tri-State Fair, the Harpers decide to rent out a room in their house to make some money.
84	24	"Naomi's Identity Crisis"	Dave Powers	Dorothy Van	March 19, 1988	422
Naomi develops amnesia after being hit with a door, so Mama tries to turn her into the perfect, modest daughter-in-law who surpasses everyone at cooking, housework, and handicrafts, much to the annoyance of everyone who was used to the sultry, lazy Naomi.
85	25	"Pomp and Circumstance"	Dave Powers	Rick Hawkins	March 26, 1988	419
Bubba and Mama are graduating from high school, but devastating news for Bubba forces valedictorian Mama to ensure that she and Bubba make it to the graduation ceremony in time. (Note: Phyllis Franklin provides the voice of Eunice in a phone call to Thelma. This was both the first "appearance" of the Eunice Higgins character in the present day since the Season Two episode "Mama's Birthday" and her last in the series.)

=== Season 5 (1988–89) ===
No. overall	No. in season	Title	Directed by	Written by	Original release date	Prod. code
86	1	"Ladies Choice"	Dave Powers	Jim Evering	November 5, 1988	502
Mama campaigns to be re-elected President of the Church Ladies League, much to the disapproval of her nemesis Alberta Meechum who in turn nominates Iola to run against her.
87	2	"Baby Talk"	Dave Powers	Rick Hawkins	November 12, 1988	501
When Naomi decides that she wants to have a baby, Mama arranges for a neighbor's constantly-screaming baby to spend the day with Naomi and Vint.
88	3	"Naomi's New Position"	Dave Powers	Dorothy Van	November 19, 1988	503
Naomi hopes to become the new assistant-manager at Food Circus, but the new manager says she will have to sleep with him if she wants to remain employed. It takes Mama to turn the tables on the sleazy manager.
89	4	"The Really Loud Family"	Dave Powers	Neil Lebowitz	November 26, 1988	504
For a school project, Bubba makes a film about the Harper family. However, a short circuit in the camera causes it to turn itself off and on again while recording, resulting in an unintentionally provocative film — shown on public TV.
90	5	"Many Unhappy Returns"	Dave Powers	Dale Phillips	December 3, 1988	505
Vint's boss, Mr. Carstairs, asks him to hold a $200 diamond bracelet for him; it is an anniversary present for Mrs. Carstairs. Mama finds it, thinking it is her birthday present.
91	6	"Found Money"	Dave Powers	Rick Hawkins	December 10, 1988	506
When Mama tries to use the bank's ATM, it malfunctions and gives her $800, and she is unsure whether to keep it or give it back to the bank. Note: For the Time Life DVD release, "I'm in the Mood for Love" was edited out. The 2019 Warner Bros. DVD release restores the original music.
92	7	"My Mama, Myself"	Dave Powers	Sydney Blake, Bill Braunstein	December 17, 1988	507
When the family starts thinking about selling a brooch that belonged to Grandma Crowley, her ghost (played by Vicki Lawrence) starts haunting Mama.
93	8	"Full House"	Dave Powers	Jim Evering	January 7, 1989	508
Vint has a chance to join a local group called the Poker Pals, but he needs Mama and Bubba to sit in for two missing players.
94	9	"Bedtime for Bubba"	Dave Powers	Rick Hawkins	January 14, 1989	510
Mama suspects that Bubba and his female classmate are doing more than studying together, and she is determined to prove it. (Note: This was the last mention of Mama's sister Fran in the series.)
95	10	"What a Dump"	Dave Powers	Beverly Archer	January 21, 1989	511
The Mayor announces that the street where Mama lives will become the new city dump, but Mama is determined to save her home and neighborhood from destruction.
96	11	"Mama Bell"	Dave Powers	Jim Evering	January 28, 1989	512
When the family gets a telephone answering machine, Mama misinterprets messages left on it and suspects that her family is planning to get rid of her.
97	12	"Very Dirty Dancing"	Dave Powers	Jim Geoghan	February 4, 1989	509
Mama finds herself in a dance contest against Vint and Naomi, partnered with her old friend Ramon.
98	13	"Mama's Layaway Plan"	Dave Powers	S : Allison Silberberg; T : Allison Silberberg, Dale Phillips	February 11, 1989	514
After coming back from a cousin's funeral where she and Effie were the only mourners, Mama starts planning her own lavish sendoff. (Note: This was the last appearance in the series for Aunt Effie Crowley/Harper, played by Dorothy Van.)
99	14	"My Phony Valentine"	Dave Powers	Rick Hawkins	February 18, 1989	515
On Valentine's Day, and Mama falsely says she has a date so that Iola will feel free to go out. To support her lie, Mama orders an escort from "Rent-a-Gent."
100	15	"The Big Wheel"	Dave Powers	Neil Lebowitz	February 25, 1989	513
When a lottery ticket seems to be the grand prize winner, Mama and Iola fight over whose it is.
101	16	"More Power to You"	Dave Powers	Bill Braunstein, Sydney Blake	March 4, 1989	516
In a standoff with the electric company, Mama refuses to pay her electric bill, so they cut off her power.
102	17	"Mama in One"	Dave Powers	Jim Evering	March 11, 1989	517
When Mama finds herself alone in the house all weekend after Iola, Bubba, Vint, and Naomi leave town, it seems like a dream come true — until boredom and loneliness set in. Note: For the Time Life DVD release, "Singin' in the Rain" was edited out. The 2019 Warner Bros. DVD release restores the original music.
103	18	"There's No Place Like...No Place"	Dave Powers	Dorothy Van	March 25, 1989	519
When the police arrest people at a rally for the homeless, Mama is accidentally arrested too.
104	19	"April Fools"	Dave Powers	Dale Phillips	April 1, 1989	518
The family plays tricks on Mama every April Fool's Day, but this year, Mama plans to play one on them.
105	20	"Reading the Riot Act"	Dave Powers	Rick Hawkins	April 15, 1989	520
Lolly Purdue is doing a terrible job as President of the Church Ladies League, so Mama and Iola plan to have her impeached, but when Lolly's issue is revealed, sympathy replaces anger. (Note: Dorothy Lyman does not appear in this episode.)
106	21	"A Taxing Situation"	Dave Powers	Neil Lebowitz	April 22, 1989	521
Vint and Naomi persuade Mama to make some creative deductions on her income tax form, but she then gets a visit from an IRS agent.
107	22	"The Mama of Invention"	Dave Powers	Albert DaSilva, Kathryn Davison	May 6, 1989	522
A man named Mr. Wheeler is interested in one of Vint's inventions, but Mama and Iola are suspicious of him.
108	23	"Hate Thy Neighbor"	Dave Powers	Neil Lebowitz	May 13, 1989	523
Bubba starts dating the granddaughter of neighbor Fred Gebhart, which upsets Mama because of a lifelong feud between the Harpers and the Gebharts.
109	24	"Dependence Day"	Dave Powers	Jim Evering	May 20, 1989	524
Iola finally stands up to her manipulative mother, only to be kicked out of her home, leaving her no alternative but to move in with the Harpers.
110	25	"Mama Makes Three"	Dave Powers	Rick Hawkins	May 27, 1989	525
After being told that they cannot conceive a child, Vint and Naomi try to adopt, but a psychiatrist must meet with them and Mama before granting his approval. Note: For the Time Life DVD release, Vint's recitation of the lyrics of "Born Free" was edited out. The 2019 Warner Bros. DVD release restores his original monologue.

=== Season 6 (1989–90) ===
No. overall	No. in season	Title	Directed by	Written by	Original release date	Prod. code
111	1	"Mama's Medicine Show"	Dave Powers	Jim Evering	September 23, 1989	601
After reading about how much it costs to raise a child, Vint and Naomi decide to start a business selling bottles of Mama's mother-in-law's "miracle tonic."
112	2	"An Affair to Forget"	Dave Powers	Sydney Blake, Bill Braunstein	September 30, 1989	602
Mama suspects that Vint is having an affair with his new trainee Heather (Teresa Ganzel), so she and Iola go to his workplace to investigate.
113	3	"Mr. Wrong"	Dave Powers	Neil Lebowitz	October 7, 1989	603
Mama encourages Iola to find herself a man, but the man she finds turns out to be a domineering blowhard.
114	4	"Now Hear This"	Dave Powers	Dale Phillips	October 14, 1989	604
The Harpers install an intercom so that Naomi will be able to monitor her baby, but the family uses it to eavesdrop on one another.
115	5	"Tri-State's Most Wanted"	Dave Powers	Kathryn Davison, Albert DaSilva	October 21, 1989	605
Mama is attracted to guest actor Leslie Lemoyne (Robert Mandan), who's appearing in a local play, until she sees him on "Tri-State's Most Wanted" (the local version of America's Most Wanted).
116	6	"Mama Fights Back"	Dave Powers	Aubrey Tadman, Gordon Mitchell	October 28, 1989	607
After Mama verbally attacks a radio show's unhelpful consumer advocate, the station manager offers her his job, with Mama broadcasting from her living room.
117	7	"A Blast from the Past"	Dave Powers	Cindy Begel, Lesa Kite	November 4, 1989	606
Mama is invited to her junior high school's 50th reunion, but she is reluctant to go because of a false rumor spread about her years ago that earned her the nickname "Hotpants."
118	8	"Psychic Pheno-Mama"	Dave Powers	Jim Evering	November 11, 1989	608
Vint and Naomi persuade Mama to have a psychic called "Madame Rita" (Liz Torres) give everyone readings. Mama is surprised by the psychic's ability at first, then later she grows suspicious of her.
119	9	"Take My Mama, Please!"	Dave Powers	Jim Geoghan	November 18, 1989	609
After heckling a stand-up comedian at the Bigger Jigger, Mama accepts a challenge to do her own routine.
120	10	"Bubba's House Band"	Dave Powers	Manny Basanese	November 25, 1989	611
Bubba books a band called The Bonecrushers for Homecoming and tells the family that the band will be staying with them. They turn out to be an all-female heavy-metal band, and Mama must rein them in.
121	11	"Mama Takes Stock"	Dave Powers	Neil Lebowitz	December 2, 1989	610
Vinton learns that he is about to lose his job because Kwik Keys is being shut down by the new owners, a corporation called Bernice, and Mama sets out to save his job.
122	12	"War of the Roses"	Dave Powers	Dale Phillips	December 9, 1989	612
When Mama and Iola prepare to enter roses into the Crystal Thorn flower contest, both of them claim ownership of the rose that has been earmarked as the winner.
123	13	"Mama Takes a Dive"	Dave Powers	Dorothy Van	December 16, 1989	613
When Mama slips on a roll of pennies at the bank, the family suggests that she sue the bank.
124	14	"Mama Gets Goosed"	Dave Powers	Jim Evering	December 23, 1989	614
Mama's cousin sends her a live goose for her family's Christmas dinner, and everyone except Mama is against the idea of killing and cooking the bird.
125	15	"The Big Nap"	Dave Powers	Manny Basanese	January 20, 1990	616
After watching detective movies on TV for a week, and hearing that Iola's mother is missing, Mama dreams that she is a film noir-style detective hired to find her client's mother.
126	16	"Pinup Mama"	Dave Powers	Albert DaSilva, Kathryn Davison	January 27, 1990	617
While working on a photography project, Bubba superimposes Mama's head on a picture of a young bikini-clad woman, but a mix-up at the print shop creates chaos.
127	17	"Guess Who's Going to Dinner"	Dave Powers	Sydney Blake, Bill Braunstein	February 3, 1990	615
Vint wins a Mother's Day dinner for two at a North African (Moroccan) restaurant called Abdul's Garden of Eatin', and he must decide between Mama and Naomi as his dinner date.
128	18	"Look Who's Breathing"	Dave Powers	Dale Phillips	February 10, 1990	618
When Mama must fill in as coach at Naomi's childbirth class instead of going to her Bingo Bonanza with Iola, she impatiently tries to speed things along by offering her own perspective on the "miracle of birth" to the class.
129	19	"There Is Nothing Like the Dames"	Dave Powers	Dorothy Van	February 17, 1990	619
Vint and Naomi buy an RV and plan to move to a trailer park, but their timing could not be worse: Mama is planning to host a fancy backyard luncheon for a snooty society group called the Dames.
130	20	"Bye-Bye – Baby!"	Dave Powers	Jim Evering	February 24, 1990	620
In the series finale, Naomi is upset about her baby being late, so Mama tries to calm her down with a false story about Carl, then later tells Iola what actually happened. Both versions are seen in flashback, featuring Ken Berry as Carl. Later that day, Naomi goes into labor and Mama ends up delivering her granddaughter, Tiffany Thelma Harper.
