= Hot Chili =

- Movie poster
- Hot Chili
- Directed by: William Sachs
- Written by: Menahem Golan, William Sachs
- Produced by: Jonathan Debin, Yoram Globus, Menahem Golan
- Starring: Allan Kayser, Joe Rubbo, Taaffe O'Connell
- Cinematography: Jorge Senyal
- Edited by: Michael J. Duthie
- Production companies: Cinexacto Films; Cannon Films
- Distributed by: Cannon Film Distributors
- Release date: June 1, 1985
- Running time: 86 minutes
- Countries: Mexico; United States
- Language: English

Hot Chili (also known as Hot Summer) is a 1985 comedy film directed by William Sachs, and co-written by Sachs with Menahem Golan (who is credited in the film as Joseph Goldman). It stars Allan Kayser, Joe Rubbo, and Taaffe O'Connell. It was filmed in Puerto Vallarta. The film is an international co-production between Mexico and the United States.

It received a negative rating from the film site AllMovie.

== Plot summary ==
Four adolescent youths travel to seek out employment opportunity at a resort in Mexico. The supervisor of the facility advises them to stay away from relations with the guests. However, the youngsters soon find themselves enmeshed in relationships with colorful figures that visit the facility including two older individuals from Texas that engage in the sexual practice of swinging, a dominatrix from Germany, a music instructor who becomes sexually aroused when giving lessons, and a large-breasted chef. One of the boys refrains from sexual activity and waits to find a match to engage with him emotionally and love him.

== Cast ==
- Charlie Stratton as Ricky (credited as Charles Schillaci)
- Allan Kayser as Jason (credited as Allan J. Kayser)
- Joe Rubbo as Arney
- Chuck Hemingway as Stanley
- Taaffe O'Connell as Brigitte
- Victoria Barrett as Victoria
- Robert Riesel as Mr. Lieberman
- Jerry Lazarus as Esteban
- Peter Bromilow as Herr Fritz
- Flo Lawrence as Mrs. Baxter (credited as Flo Gerrish)
- Armando Silvestre as Pedro
- Peg Shirley as Mrs. Lieberman
- Ferdy Mayne as Mr. Houston (credited as Ferdinand Mayne)
- Connie Sawyer as Mrs. Houston
- Katherine Kriss as Allison
- Jill Mallorie as Sheila
- Theresa Mesquita as Kathy Davis
- Robert Z'Dar as Bruno (credited as Robert Zdar)
- Federico Gonzales as Emilio
- Louisa Moritz as "Chi Chi"
- Bea Fiedler as Music Teacher

== Production ==
=== Casting ===
Cast members include Allan Kayser, Joe Rubbo, and Louisa Moritz.

=== Filming ===
The film was directed by William Sachs. Prior to shooting Hot Chili, Sachs had directed nine films; his most recent previous film was the science fiction film Galaxina released in 1980.

== Reception ==
AllMovie gave the film a rating of one star out of a possible five.

== See also ==
- 1985 in film
