= Evan A. Lottman =

American film editor (1931–2023)

- Born: Evan Alan Lottman; March 20, 1931; New York City, New York, U.S.
- Died: September 25, 2001 (aged 70); New York City, New York, U.S.
- Occupation: Film editor
- Spouse: Eileen Lottman
- Children: 1
- Relatives: Herbert Lottman (brother)

Evan Alan Lottman (March 20, 1931 – September 25, 2001) was an American film editor, noted for his association with New Hollywood. He was known for his collaborations with directors Jerry Schatzberg and Alan J. Pakula, and was nominated for an Academy Award for Best Film Editing for his work on The Exorcist (1973).

== Early life and education ==
Born in The Bronx in 1931, Lottman served in the United States Army Signal Corps, before attending Kenyon College and the University of Southern California.

== Career ==
Lottman began his career his career editing documentaries and industrial films in his native New York. His first credit on a feature film was as a montage editor on The Hustler (1961).

In 1970, Lottman edited his first film, the spy parody The Man from O.R.G.Y. That same year, he met director Jerry Schatzberg, who hired him to edit his debut film Puzzle of a Downfall Child. Lottman and Schatzberg would form a successful partnership, working together on a total of six films between 1970 and 1980.

In 1973, Lottman was one of four editors on William Friedkin's The Exorcist. The film was nominated for ten Academy Awards, including Best Film Editing, which Lottman shared with Bud S. Smith, Norman Gay, and Jordan Leondopoulos.

Lottman also had a successful collaboration with director Alan J. Pakula, over five films between 1981 and 1990. He also edited films for such directors as Francis Ford Coppola, Paul Newman, Frank Oz, and Sidney Lumet.

== Personal life ==
Lottman lived in New York City. He had one child with his wife, Eileen. His brother was author Herbert Lottman.

=== Death ===
Lottman died in September 2001 of esophageal cancer at his home in Manhattan, at the age of 70.

== Filmography ==
=== Feature films ===
Year	Title	Functioned as		Director	Notes
Year	Title	Editor	Other	Director	Notes
1961	The Hustler	No	Yes	Robert Rossen	Montage sequence editor
1970	The Man from O.R.G.Y.	Yes	No	James Hill	
1970	Puzzle of a Downfall Child	Yes	No	Jerry Schatzberg	1st of 6 collaborations with Schatzberg
1971	The Panic in Needle Park	Yes	No	Jerry Schatzberg	
1972	The Effect of Gamma Rays on Man-in-the-Moon Marigolds	Yes	No	Paul Newman	
1973	Scarecrow	Yes	No	Jerry Schatzberg	
1973	The Exorcist	Yes	No	William Friedkin	with Norman Gay and Bud S. Smith
1975	Bride to Be	Yes	No	Rafael Moreno Alba	with Pedro del Rey and Antonio Gimeno
1976	Sweet Revenge	Yes	No	Jerry Schatzberg	Also actor (as 'Bailiff')
1978	On the Yard	Yes	No	Raphael D. Silver	with Richard Fetterman
1979	Apocalypse Now	Yes	Yes	Francis Ford Coppola	Additional editor, actor (as 'Soldier')
1979	The Seduction of Joe Tynan	Yes	No	Jerry Schatzberg	
1980	Honeysuckle Rose	Yes	No	Jerry Schatzberg	with Aram Avakian, Norman Gay, and Marc Laub
1980	The Pilot	Yes	No	Cliff Robertson	
1981	Rollover	Yes	No	Alan J. Pakula	1st of 5 collaborations with Pakula
1982	Sophie's Choice	Yes	No	Alan J. Pakula	
1984	The Muppets Take Manhattan	Yes	No	Frank Oz	
1985	The Protector	Yes	No	James Glickenhaus	
1986	Maximum Overdrive	Yes	Yes	Stephen King	Also actor (as 'Grey Van Driver')
1987	Orphans	Yes	No	Alan J. Pakula	
1989	See You in the Morning	Yes	No	Alan J. Pakula	
1989	Forced March	Yes	No	Rick King	
1990	Presumed Innocent	Yes	No	Alan J. Pakula	
1991	Missing Pieces	Yes	No	Leonard B. Stern	
1992	The Public Eye	Yes	No	Howard Franklin	
1993	Guilty as Sin	Yes	No	Sidney Lumet	
1996	Thinner	Yes	No	Tom Holland	Additional editor

=== Short films ===
Year	Title	Functioned as		Director	Notes
Year	Title	Editor	Other	Director	Notes
1972	The Witches of Salem: The Horror and the Hope	Yes	Yes	Dennis Azzarella	Also associate producer

=== Television ===
Year	Title	Functioned as		Notes
Year	Title	Editor	Other	Notes
1977	James Michener's World: Hawaii Revisited	Yes	No	Documentary special
1978	Special Treat	Yes	No	Episode: "Snowbound" (S3E4)
1980	The Day the Women Got Even	Yes	No	Television film
1988	Gotham	Yes	No	Television film
1994	Reunion	Yes	No	Television film

== Awards and nominations ==
Award	Year	Category	Work	Result	Ref.
Academy Award	1974	Best Film Editing	The Exorcist	Lost to William H. Reynolds for The Sting.	
