= Taaffe O'Connell =

American actress (born 1951)

- Born: May 14, 1951 (age 75); Providence, Rhode Island, US
- Other name: Taffy O'Connell
- Education: University of Mississippi
- Occupations: Actress; publisher
- Years active: 1974–present
- Known for: Galaxy of Terror; The Change-Up

Taaffe O'Connell (born May 14, 1951) is an American actress and publisher, best known by her fans for her performance in the cult-classic sci-fi horror film Galaxy of Terror. Her acting career began in the late 1970s and continued uninterrupted through the 1980s. Her career has seen a rebirth after 2000 and has continued to the present day.

Apart from acting, O'Connell started and owned the Canoco Publishing Company during the 1990s. Canoco is a Los Angeles–based company that produced Astro Caster Magazine, which specialized in casting information and advice for actors and actresses. O'Connell has written numerous articles for the magazine as well as being its owner and publisher.

== Life and career ==
O'Connell was born in Providence, Rhode Island. O'Connell's early career consisted primarily of TV show appearances (Three's Company, Happy Days, Dallas, Laverne & Shirley, Blansky's Beauties). In 1980, she starred in the slasher cult film New Year's Evil.

=== Role in Galaxy of Terror ===
She achieved lasting fame within the B-movie, horror film universe for her role as Dameia in Galaxy of Terror. Released in 1981, it was the second consecutive horror film she had appeared in, having also appeared in the 1980 film New Year's Evil. O'Connell's place as a scream queen legend was guaranteed with Galaxy of Terror due to the unique, bizarre, and exploitative scene in which her character is killed.

O'Connell's character, Dameia, like most of the other characters in the film, faces a psychological fear and gets destroyed by it. Instead of just being killed violently, however, Dameia is raped by a giant 12-foot maggot. The sequence was restricted or the movie was banned from cinematic release in several countries for the lewd sexual content of her scene. The graphic nature of the scene, which almost earned the movie an X-rating, has given the film a cult status in the years since its release.

As a result of this, O'Connell has had cameo appearances in several other horror films in the 1990s and early 2000s, and B-movie print productions like Femme Fatales and Fangoria have done features on her, the scene, and the film. O'Connell herself has a prominent role in the commentary of the DVD/Blu-ray release, as well as in its companion feature Tales from the Lumber Yard, which discusses the making of the film.

=== 1990s - present ===
During the 1990s, O'Connell's focus shifted away from acting and into publishing. Her Canoco Publishing Company has continued operations for 20 years and produces Astro Caster Magazine, a trade magazine which combines traditional casting for actors and actresses with astrological insights and information.

O'Connell appeared in the films, Spork, Going Down in LA-LA Land and The Change-Up.

== Filmography ==
- Blansky's Beauties (1977, TV Series) – Hillary S. Prentiss
- CHiPs (1979, TV Series) – Crystal
- The New Adventures of Wonder Woman (1979, TV series) – Val
- Rocky II (1979) – Ring Girl (uncredited)
- The Incredible Hulk (1980, TV Series) – Miss Farber
- New Year's Evil (1980) – Jane
- Galaxy of Terror (1981) – Dameia
- Caged Fury (1983) – Honey
- Knight Rider (1984, TV Series) – Denise Reynolds
- Hot Chili (1985) – Brigitte
- Dallas (1990, TV Series) – Honey North
- The Stoneman (2002) – Hooker #1
- Dismembered (2003) – Duty Nurse
- Spork (2010) – Mrs. Byotch
- Going Down in LA-LA Land (2011) – Job Interviewer
- The Change-Up (2011) – Mona
