= The Man from O.R.G.Y. =

1970 film by James Hill

- Theatrical release poster
- Directed by: James Hill
- Screenplay by: Ted Mark
- Based on: The Man from O.R.G.Y. by Ted Mark
- Produced by: Sidney W. Pink
- Starring: Robert Walker Jr.; Louisa Moritz; Slappy White; Lynne Carter; Steve Rossi
- Cinematography: José F. Aguayo
- Edited by: Evan A. Lottman
- Music by: Charles Bernstein
- Production companies: Cinemation Industries; United Hemisphere-Delta
- Distributed by: Cinemation Industries; Prima Film
- Release dates: April 3, 1970 (New York City, New York)
- Running time: 92:00
- Country: United States
- Language: English

The Man from O.R.G.Y. (Organization for the Rational Guidance of Youth) (also known as The Real Gone Girls) is a 1970 comedy film directed by James Hill and starring Robert Walker Jr., Louisa Moritz, Slappy White, Lynne Carter and Steve Rossi, based on the 1965 novel of the same name by Ted Mark. It was filmed in Puerto Rico and New York City. The film has elements of espionage and sex.

== Plot ==
Steve Victor is a spy and scientific investigator for the group Organization for the Rational Guidance of Youth (O.R.G.Y.). Victor is given a mission to determine the location of three prostitutes who are due $15 million from their deceased female manager. Victor starts on the trail knowing only that the three women each has a tattoo on her buttocks of a gopher grinning. He is stymied in his efforts by hired assassins Luigi and Vito. Luigi and Vito have an interest in the investigation because they provided financing for the burlesque business. Another prostitute Gina states her lack of interest in her owed portion of the money as she does not wish her wealthy spouse to find out about her activities. Gina tells Victor some clues about how to locate the other two women, although Victor later discovers they are both deceased. Gina had murdered them for in actuality she wants the money. She kills Vito by thrusting a knife into him as he is planning on murdering Victor. Gina turns to kill Victor, but he first shoots the woman and she dies after falling from a window.

== Production ==
=== Source material ===
The Man from O.R.G.Y. was originally a paperback book by Ted Mark, the pen name of Theodore "Ted" Mark Gottfried. The first seven books in The Man from O.R.G.Y series were published by Lancer Books.

==== Ted Mark’s The Man from O.R.G.Y. series ====
1. The Man from O.R.G.Y. (Lancer Books, 1965)
2. The 9-Month Caper (Lancer Books, 1965)
3. The Real Gone Girls (Lancer Books, 1966)
4. Dr. Nyet (Lancer Books, 1966)
5. My Son, The Double Agent (Lancer Books, 1966)
6. A Hard Day's Knight (Lancer Books, 1966)
7. Room at the Topless (Lancer Books, 1967)
8. Back Home at the O.R.G.Y. (Berkley Books, 1968)
9. Here's Your O.R.G.Y. (Berkley Books, 1970)
10. Around the World is Not a Trip (Dell Publishing, 1973)
11. Dial "O" for O.R.G.Y. (Dell, 1973)
12. Beauty and the Bug (Dell, 1975)
13. The Girls from O.R.G.Y. (Manor Books, 1975)
14. The Man from O.R.G.Y.: Thy Neighbor's Orgy (Zebra Books, 1981)
15. The Tight End (Zebra Books, 1981)

=== Casting ===
Louisa Moritz made her feature film debut in The Man from O.R.G.Y. Lynne Carter portrayed the female proprietor of the prostitution establishment in the film; he appeared in drag. His character imitated celebrities including Tallulah Bankhead, Bette Davis, Marlene Dietrich and Hermione Gingold.

=== Marketing ===
The production company marketed the film with the slogan: "Meet Steve Victor, a new breed of agent. He stands up for what he believes in ... SEX!"

== Reception ==
Overall, the film did not get a positive reception. A reviewer for The New York Times commented: "A certain charming innocence pertains to all the low-level vulgarity, as it does to the plump, often pretty girls themselves, with their piled-up hairdo's, their freighted eyelids, and their brave little attempts to say their lines." This poor reception had a negative impact on the filmwriting career of Ted Mark. British Film Culture in the 1970s described the film as a sex parody piece.

== See also ==
- The Man from U.N.C.L.E.
- List of American films of 1970
- B movie
- B movies (exploitation boom)
- Cinema of Puerto Rico
- List of films set in Puerto Rico
