= Dorothy Van =

American actress

- as Aunt Effie on Mama's Family
- Born: Dorothy Helene Vanberryl; January 10, 1928; Moline, Illinois, US
- Died: May 16, 2002 (aged 74); Los Angeles, California, US
- Resting place: Cremated
- Occupations: Actress, TV writer
- Years active: 1946–1992
- Spouse: Jim Evering (1950–2000)
- Children: 3

Dorothy Van (January 10, 1928 - May 16, 2002) was an American stage and TV actress who is best remembered for her comedic role as Aunt Effie Harper on the 1980s situation comedy Mama's Family.

== Early life ==
She was born Dorothy Helene Vanberryl in Moline, Illinois, to Elmer J. Vanberryl, a German post office worker, and Emeline Franks Vanberryl. As a child she spent considerable time watching the movies of the day. Her favorite actresses during this time were Irene Dunne, Loretta Young, and Bette Davis; and she remembered having a girlhood crush on Joel McCrea. She also enjoyed reading, writing, and painting. She was a devout Methodist, active in the church Sunday School at Christ United Methodist Church. Her father had suggested that upon completing high school, Dorothy should enroll in secretarial school, find a husband, and settle down. However, upon her 1946 graduation she pursued a stage career. Because her father did not approve of this decision she acted under the name "Dorothy Van" to avoid family embarrassment.

== Acting career ==
When she arrived at Broadway, she began as a chorus girl in musicals. She often appeared in uncredited roles in such plays as The Skin of Our Teeth, All My Sons, The Maids, The Heiress, The Shifting Heart, and The Mousetrap. After years of stage work, she made her movie debut playing an army nurse in Loose Shoes. Later in the decade she landed a recurring role as Aunt Effie to Vicki Lawrence's character of Thelma Harper on Mama's Family; she appeared in seven episodes between 1983 and 1989.

== Writing career ==
Van also wrote for television. In 1985, she wrote two episodes for the sitcom Silver Spoons; she also wrote episodes for Mama's Family, Punky Brewster, and Major Dad.

== Retirement and later life ==
In 1992, Van retired from acting and writing. She and her husband continued living in Los Angeles; she worked in the St. Mark United Methodist Church as director of the church choir and Bible study sessions. She supported animal rights, the Republican Party, and civil rights for the elderly. In spite of her relatively few TV appearances, she took pride in receiving fan letters, which she kept for many years. She was close friends with Vicki Lawrence and with Ken Berry, who was also a native from her hometown, and she even became good friends with her childhood idol Shirley Temple who attended the same Methodist church in Los Angeles.

By 2000, Van had developed Parkinson's disease and was homebound. Van died in her Los Angeles home on May 16, 2002, at age seventy-four.
