= Galaxy of Terror =

1981 film by Bruce D. Clark

- International theatrical release poster
- Directed by: Bruce D. Clark
- Written by: Marc Siegler; Bruce D. Clark
- Produced by: Roger Corman
- Starring: Edward Albert; Erin Moran; Ray Walston
- Cinematography: Jacques Haitkin
- Edited by: R.J. Kizer; Larry Bock; Barry Zetlin
- Music by: Barry Schrader
- Production company: New World Pictures
- Distributed by: New World Pictures (U.S.); United Artists (International)
- Release date: September 4, 1981
- Running time: 81 minutes
- Country: United States
- Language: English
- Budget: $1.8 million
- Box office: $4 million or $1.3 million

Galaxy of Terror (originally released as Mindwarp: An Infinity of Terror) is a 1981 American science fiction horror film directed by Bruce D. Clark and produced by Roger Corman through New World Pictures. It stars Edward Albert, Erin Moran, Ray Walston, Taaffe O'Connell, and future horror film stars Sid Haig and Robert Englund. Set in a dystopian future where humanity is a spacefaring race ruled by a sole person called "The Master," the film features a space crew confronting primal fears after they are marooned on a distant planet.

The film has many of the hallmarks associated with the "B-movie" style Roger Corman became known for: low budget, up-and-coming production personnel, and exploitive material, including a notorious scene in which a giant maggot rapes Dameia (Taaffe O'Connell). It is also notable for its production design and visual effects, which were created by James Cameron in one of his earliest filmmaking credits.

Released on September 4, 1981, the film has developed a cult following. Critics have noted its influence on later productions, most notably Cameron's own Aliens (1986).

== Plot ==
On the planet Morganthus, a monster kills the last survivor of a crashed spaceship. On the world of Xerxes, the Planet Master, someone whose face is obscured by an aura, instructs one of his military commanders to take the spaceship Quest to Morganthus. The Planet Master plays a chess-like game with an old woman, Mitri, who predicts that his actions will lead to ruin.

The Quest is piloted by Captain Trantor, a survivor of a space disaster that left her psychologically scarred. While approaching Morganthus's atmosphere, the ship veers out of control, but Trantor makes the landing. The rescue team then leaves the Quest in search of survivors.

The team reaches the other vessel and finds victims, making them think that a massacre took place. They take one body back for analysis and dispose of the rest. Cos, a young crewmember, becomes terrified of being on the ship. He is later killed by something that vanishes before anyone finds his remains.

The crew later discovers a force emanating from the pyramidal structure that pulled the Quest down and keeps it from lifting off. Leaving their ship, they approach the structure, which the psi-sensitive Alluma describes as "empty" and "dead". Splitting up, one team led by Commander Ilvar discovers an opening along a side of the pyramid. Ilvar insists, over the objections of his two younger counterparts, on going in first. While being lowered, Ilvar is attacked by tentacles within the chamber that drain his body of blood, killing him.

The other two continue on to the surface, linking up with the other group, and find another entrance. Leaving crewmember Quuhod to guard the entrance, the remaining four search inside the pyramid. Quuhod, who has a religious affinity for crystal stars, later sees one form in front of his eyes. Before he picks it up, the crystal springs to life and attacks him. As he tries to remove it, a piece breaks off and begins sliding through his skin, forcing him to sever his arm to keep it from entering the remainder of his body. The dismembered arm becomes animated and throws the crystal star into his chest, killing him.

Alluma starts sensing something unusual, so technical chief Dameia is sent back to the entrance. Dameia discovers Quuhod's severed arm being swarmed by maggots. She blasts the arm and staggers off. One surviving maggot grows to giant size and, when Dameia returns to the chamber, proceeds to rape and kill her. On the ship, crewman Ranger sees Trantor running as if being attacked. Trantor combusts as she fires a weapon in an airlock. The remaining rescue team members find Dameia's naked remains, and return to the ship.

All the surviving Quest crewmembers return to the pyramid, where Baelon elects to stay behind and is torn apart by a monster. Inside the pyramid, Alluma, Ranger and Cabren are separated by moving walls. Ranger feels a rush of terror and before being attacked by a double. Regaining control of himself, he fends off the double, which fades away. Alluma, crawling through a tunnel, is attacked by tentacles which crush her head. Ranger and Specialist Cabren later discover that the planet creates monsters to attack people based upon their individual fears. Inside the pyramid, the two meet Kore, the ship's cook.

Cabren discovers that Kore is really the Master, who was masquerading as the cook on board the Quest. The pyramid is an ancient toy for the children of a long-extinct race, built to test their ability to control fear. Cabren is forced to confront the creatures which attacked the crew and also zombified versions of the victims, all of which he kills. After defeating his final challenge, Cabren "wins" the game. Kore starts dying, and the energy that engulfed his face engulfs Cabren. Stating that he will not play the game, Cabren decides to leave Morganthus. Kore's dying words express doubt that Cabren will manage to change his fate. Angered, Cabren kills Kore, but as the Master himself cannot die, he becomes the new Planet Master.

== Cast ==
- Edward Albert as Cabren, an experienced and cool-headed space veteran who is the film's main protagonist
- Erin Moran as Alluma, the ship's empath
- Ray Walston as Kore, the ship's cook
- Taaffe O'Connell as Dameia, the ship's technical officer
- Bernard Behrens as Commander Ilvar, the overall commander of the mission
- Zalman King as Baelon, the rescue unit's team leader
- Robert Englund as Ranger, the ship's second technical officer
- Sid Haig as Quuhod, crewman and crystal shuriken thrower
- Grace Zabriskie as Captain Trantor, the ship's troubled captain
- Jack Blessing as Cos, an inexperienced, frightened crewman

== Production ==
=== James Cameron ===
While known as a "B movie king", Roger Corman has started the careers of many prominent Hollywood people with his films. Galaxy of Terror was one of the earliest films to feature the work of James Cameron, who served as Production Designer and Second Unit Director on the film. It was the second Corman film on which Cameron worked as a crewman, the first being Battle Beyond the Stars (1980). Working on a tight budget, Cameron's innovative filmmaking techniques came to the forefront. In one scene, Cameron was able to figure out a way to get maggots to wiggle on cue by developing a metal plate onto which the maggots were placed, then ran an electric current through the plate whenever filming began, causing the maggots to move energetically about. His ability to find low-tech solutions to such problems reportedly made him a favorite of Corman and eventually allowed him to pursue more ambitious projects.

Ridley Scott's Alien (1979) was an important inspiration for Galaxy of Terror and Cameron would later direct the sequel, Aliens (1986). Optical effects supervisor Tony Randel commented on the Shout! Factory DVD release that Aliens looks like Galaxy of Terror in many ways.

=== Taaffe O'Connell and "the worm scene" ===
The commentary on the 2010 Shout! Factory DVD release includes R.J. Kizer, one of three editors of the film. Kizer reveals that the originally scripted version of O'Connell's "Dameia" character would see her die topless while being stripped and consumed by a monster. Producer Roger Corman, however, had promised financial backers of the movie a sex scene. In the early stages, the sex scene could have involved either the Alluma or the Dameia character, but Moran chose to have her character die violently, leaving the sex scene to O'Connell's character of Dameia. Corman re-wrote Dameia's death so that she would be confronted by an id monster, in this case a 12-foot (3.7 m) long maggot complete with slime and tentacles, that represented both her fear of worms and a fear of sex. The re-write included full nudity and far more explicit sexual content, including simulated sexual intercourse, during which Dameia would be seen and heard reacting first with terror, then forced sexual arousal, to the monster raping her. Dameia would perish as the monster drives her to a fatally intense orgasm.

After informing director Clark and actress O'Connell of the changes and having both of them balk, Corman decided to direct the worm scene himself. He hired a body double (it is suggested in the Shout! commentary of the film that this was Iya Labunka) to shoot the full-nudity sequences. In the released film, the worm scene as it is shown is a mix of shots with O'Connell and the body double. The completed film was submitted to the Motion Picture Association film rating system (MPAA) for review. While the MPAA did not specify exactly what it gave the rating for, the film was initially given an X rating, a rating which existed at that time that was used with films containing adult content of a graphic nature. Both the Alluma and Dameia scenes received an X rating, the first apparently for the violent sound effects as the Alluma character is crushed (the sound of bones being crushed was removed), and the second for sexual content.

Kizer, in the film's commentary, stated he then had to go back and remove anything sexually explicit enough to earn the X-rating. He removed any "erotic rhapsody looks" on O'Connell's face as she was being raped. According to the film documentary, Kizer also removed any suggestive "humping movements" made by the worm. In Kizer's words, he made "all these little, little snips of film" removing those aspects, re-submitted the film, and the rating was changed to R. The cuts were anywhere from about 1 foot of film (less than 1 second) down to a single frame." The final released scene in film and VHS versions still contains segments with O'Connell's facial expressions and side views of her or the body double moving up and down underneath the worm, indicating that the cuts were probably made in or around those sequences.

Several countries still found this too explicit and either required the worm scene to be cut short or deleted entirely, or even denied the film a theatrical release outright. All later authorized VHS/DVD/Blu-ray/Steelbook releases of the film in Europe, America and elsewhere contain the scene as it was released in its final, R-rated version. The X rated clipped materials themselves were lost over time and are not included in any release. However, there are red-band trailers still in existence that hint at some changes made. One, made when the movie was still called "Mindwarp...", shows cuts from the scene with O'Connell's voice the same as in the movie, but which also has sound effects of her uniform being ripped; these sound effects were removed at some point. A second trailer, made with Galaxy of Terror as the title, shows the same sequence without the clothes ripping sounds and with another actress's voice screaming. Both trailers visually have one sequence which may be slightly longer than the same sequence in the movie, indicating it may be one of the "clipped" sequences.

The worm scene can be seen again, in part, during the opening credits of a later Corman produced film, the 1988 remake of Not of This Earth directed by Jim Wynorski and starring Traci Lords. It has nothing to do with the content of that film, but is part of a montage from earlier Corman films shown during the opening credits. The audio in the Not of this Earth version is done by another, uncredited actress.

The worm scene is discussed on the commentary of the Blu-ray Disc release more than any other aspect of the film. Clark, the director, admits that Corman's insertion of the scene, which Clark adamantly opposed, is what ultimately made the film a commercial success. O'Connell, in a separate interview with Femme Fatales magazine, interpreted that Dameia was frightened by her own sexual desire to completely submit to someone or something powerful, which the phallic, tentacled monster lethally provides. O'Connell also relates in the commentary how physically challenging the scene was and how the maggot prop made for the film, which weighed in at over a ton, almost collapsed on top of her at one point, which could have potentially killed her.

== Release ==
The film premiered in Illinois and Indiana on September 4, 1981. Its original title was Mindwarp: An Infinity of Terror (sometimes shortened to just Mindwarp). However, after initial screenings it was retitled Galaxy of Terror, the name by which it is now mainly known.

=== Home media ===
The film was originally released on VHS and LaserDisc by Nelson Entertainment. Up until 2010, Galaxy of Terror did not have an authorized Region 1 (North America) DVD release. There was a remastered and authorized Region 2 (Europe) Italian disc available from Mondo Home Entertainment released in 2006 which is now out-of-print. The lack of authorized discs for so many years has led to numerous unauthorized copies of the movie being sold online and elsewhere.

On July 20, 2010, Shout! Factory released Galaxy of Terror on Region 1 DVD and, for the first time, on Blu-ray Disc. The release also contains cast interviews and behind-the-scenes information on a variety of aspects. On February 11, 2025, Shout! released a 2-disc 4K UHD version of the film, one disc the 4k restoration of the 35 mm original in Dolby, the second disc the restoration on Blu-ray along with all the additional features from the 2010 release.

The film was released in Germany in a dual Blu-ray and DVD uncut 2-disc limited edition mediabook from BMV-Medien Entertainment on April 19, 2012. The film was also released in Japan on Blu-ray from Stingray distribution on September 27, 2013, and contains the original English language version and a Japanese dubbed version both in Mono DTS-HD Master Audio and also includes Japanese subtitles.

== Reception and legacy ==
On Rotten Tomatoes it has an approval rating of 33% based on 15 reviews. On Metacritic the film has a score of 38% based on reviews from 5 critics, indicating "generally unfavorable" reviews.

=== Influence on later productions ===
Galaxy of Terror has typically been reviewed as one of a number of Alien (1979) rip-offs that appeared in the early 1980s, but it has also been credited with itself influencing later, more mainstream films such as Aliens (1986). There is a direct connection between Galaxy of Terror and Aliens in that the latter was directed by James Cameron. The success of Aliens, which shares Galaxy of Terror's grim and dark visual aesthetic (completed with a much greater budget) has in turn influenced a variety of later films. Another mainstream sci-fi/horror film that seems to have borrowed directly from Galaxy of Terror's plot line of astronauts facing base fears is Event Horizon (1997). Both are however predated by "Forbidden Planet" (1956) with its training device and 'Monsters from the Id'.

Cameron would work with several of Galaxy of Terror's crew on later productions. Brothers Robert and Dennis Skotak, respectively co-production designer and VFX cinematographer, would go on to win Best Visual Effects Oscars for Cameron's Aliens and Terminator 2: Judgment Day. VFX camera operator Randall Frakes would be a synethsist on Aliens and an uncredited story writer on True Lies (1994).

In addition to Cameron, the film is also known for indirectly starting actor Bill Paxton's career. At this time, Paxton was not an actor, but was working as a set decorator. His working relation with Cameron would eventually lead him into acting. Iya Labunka, later a film producer and wife of Wes Craven, had an early job as a prosthetics fabricator.

== See also ==
- Journey to the Seventh Planet
