= Louisa Moritz =

Cuban-American actress and lawyer (1936–2019)

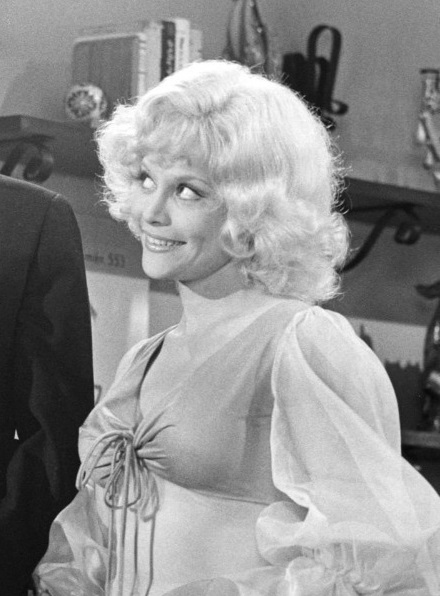
- Moritz in Love, American Style (1971)
- Born: Luisa Cira Castro Netto; September 25, 1936; Havana, Cuba
- Died: January 4, 2019 (aged 82); Los Angeles, California
- Other name: Louisa Castro
- Education: Abraham Lincoln University School of Law
- Occupations: Actress; lawyer
- Years active: 1966–2000

Louisa Moritz (born Luisa Cira Castro Netto; September 25, 1936 – January 4, 2019) was a Cuban-American actress and lawyer. After arriving in New York from Cuba, she became a film and television actress, then earned a law degree. She is best known for her roles in One Flew Over the Cuckoo’s Nest and the television show Love, American Style.

== Early life ==
Moritz was born in Havana, where she worked as an accountant. Owing to the political upheaval of the late 1950s she left Cuba and moved to New York, arriving on July 15, 1960, aged 23. She later shaved 10 years off her true age, adopting 1946 as her year of birth. To avoid association with Fidel Castro, to whom she was distantly related, she adopted the last name Moritz after seeing the Hotel St. Moritz in New York City.

== Professional life ==
Unable to speak English when she first moved to the United States in 1960, Moritz started acting in commercials in the 1960s. Her first film was The Man from O.R.G.Y. in 1970. In 1982, Moritz had a role in The Last American Virgin as Carmela. Moritz generally played ditzy blondes, appearing in numerous films, of which the best known was One Flew Over the Cuckoo's Nest in 1975 as the prostitute Rose, and in TV shows, including Happy Days, M*A*S*H, and Love, American Style, where she was a regular.

Moritz later studied law at the University of West Los Angeles and Abraham Lincoln University. She was admitted to the California Bar in 2004. According to her publicist, she was at the top of her class and won the American Jurisprudence Bancroft Whitney Prize for Contracts.

On June 25, 2015, Moritz was suspended from the State Bar of California for failing to provide certain quarterly reports. On October 1, 2017, she was disbarred for failure to comply with terms set out in her previous disciplinary actions and to respond to the California Bar.

Moritz also invested in real estate, owning a hotel in Beverly Hills that she renamed the Beverly Hills St. Moritz, and produced self-defense programs for TV.

== Death ==
After being injured in a fall during a visit to Washington, D.C., Moritz died in a hospital in Los Angeles, aged 82, on January 4, 2019, of natural causes.

== Accusations against Bill Cosby ==
In November 2014, Moritz became one of the first women to accuse Bill Cosby, claiming Cosby sexually assaulted her in the green room of The Tonight Show in 1971. After Cosby accused her of lying, she sued him for defamation. Her lawyer planned to continue the lawsuit after her death. Cosby's insurance company settled in April 2019.

== Selected filmography ==
=== Film ===
- Assignment: Female (1966) as Miss Mousie
- The Man from O.R.G.Y. (1970) as Gina Moretti
- The Nine Lives of Fritz the Cat (1974) as Chita (Juan's sister) (voice)
- La disputa (1974)
- Fore Play (1975) as Lt. Sylvia Arliss
- Death Race 2000 (1975) as Myra
- One Flew Over the Cuckoo's Nest (1975) as Rose
- Six Pack Annie (1975) as Flora
- Cannonball (1976) as Louisa
- The Happy Hooker Goes to Washington (1977) as Natalie Nussbaum
- Charge of the Model T's (1977) as Hilda
- Loose Shoes (1978) as Margie, Duddy's Date
- Up in Smoke (1978) as Officer Gloria Whitey
- The North Avenue Irregulars (1979) as Mrs. Gossin
- Cuba (1979) as Miss Wonderly
- New Year's Evil (1980) as Sally
- Under the Rainbow (1981) as Telephone Operator
- True Confessions (1981) as Whore
- Lunch Wagon (1981) as Sunshine
- The Last American Virgin (1982) as Carmela
- Chained Heat (1983) as Bubbles
- Jungle Warriors (1984) as Laura McCashin
- Hot Chili (1985) as Chi Chi
- Galaxis (1995) as Bar Lady at Sharkey's
- The Independent (2000) as Sally / Receptionist (final film role)

=== Television ===
- The Leslie Uggams Show, episode dated 12 October 1969 as French Wife
- The Joe Namath Show, episode dated 21 October 1969 as Mail Girl
- Love, American Style, segments of various episodes in 1971–72 as Candy Lee (segment "Love and the Alibi") / Dawn (segment "Love and the Vacation") / Dawn (segment "Love and the Detective")
- Ironside, episode "Man Named Arno" in 1972 as Bonnie
- Happy Days, episode "Richie's Cup Runneth Over" in 1974 as Verna LaVerne
- Happy Anniversary and Goodbye (1974 TV movie) as Terry
- M*A*S*H, episode "Bombed" in 1975 as Nurse Sanchez
- Match Game, panelist in 1974–75
- One Day at a Time, episode "How to Succeed Without Trying" in 1976 as Receptionist
- Chico and the Man, episode "Chico Packs His Bags" in 1976 as Lorraine
- The Rockford Files, episode "The Dog and Pony Show" in 1977 as Helen
- The Rockford Files, episode "A Good Clean Bust with Sequel Rights" in 1978 as Debbi
- The Incredible Hulk, episode "Sideshow" in 1980 as Beth
- The Associates, episode "The Censors" in 1980 as Vera #1
- Enos, episode "The Head Hunter" in 1981
- The Cartier Affair (1984 TV movie) as Wife of Fish Market/Restaurant Owner
