= Joe Rubbo =

American film actor and television producer

Joseph Rubbo
- Born: July 26, 1963 (age 61); The Bronx, New York, U.S.
- Occupation(s): Producer, actor
- Years active: 1980—present
- Children: 3

Joseph Rubbo (born July 26, 1963) is an American film actor and television producer best known for his performance as David in the 1982 coming-of-age comedy-drama The Last American Virgin. He is a member of SAG-AFTRA.

== Early life ==
Rubbo was born in The Bronx, New York.

== Career ==
One of Rubbo's earliest film roles was as a wrestler in the critically acclaimed 1982 Robin Williams comedy drama The World According to Garp. However, he is most known for co-starring as David in Boaz Davidson's The Last American Virgin (1982) and Arney in the 1985 teen film/sex comedy Hot Chili. He later had a minor role in the 1996 movie Striptease.

Rubbo made numerous television appearances on The Late Show with David Letterman throughout the 1980s, most memorably playing Letterman's stepson "Ray Letterman" in a sketch. Since 2010, he has been the executive producer of VIP Television, an entertainment news/lifestyle program focused on South Florida.

== Selected filmography ==
- The World According to Garp (1982)
- The Last American Virgin (1982)
- Hot Chili (1985)
- Striptease (1996)
