= Herbert Lottman =

Herbert Roger Lottman (August 16, 1927, Brooklyn – August 27, 2014, Paris) was an American author who specialized in writing biographies on French subjects. An influential biographer, he published 17 biographies, 15 of which were related to French culture, commerce, or politics; including works on Albert Camus, Colette, Gustave Flaubert, Henri Philippe Pétain, Jules Verne, and the Rothschild banking family of France. He wrote that, just before dying, Albert Camus was pledged to marry. Camus's estate tried to block his book, partly because of this controversial statement.

== Life and career ==
Born in Brooklyn, Lottman was the son of a Broadway press agent. His brother, Evan A. Lottman, is an Oscar nominated film editor. He graduated from New York University in 1948 with degrees in English and biology. He won a Fulbright Scholarship which enabled him to pursue further studies in Paris. There he met and married his first wife Michele before returning to New York to attend graduate school at Columbia University, graduating with a Masters in English in 1951.

In 1956 Lottman moved to Paris where he briefly attempted to pursue a career as a novelist. He ultimately settled on managing the Paris branch of the publisher Farrar, Straus and Giroux, writing freelance articles for magazines, and working as a biographer, publishing his first book, Detours From the Grand Tour, in 1970. He also worked for Publishers Weekly as a writer for four decades.

In 1991 Lottman was appointed Chevalier of the Ordre des Arts et des Lettres, and was later made an Officer in 1996. He died at his home in Paris at the age of 87 and is buried at the Montparnasse Cemetery.
