= Slappy White =

American comedian and actor (1921–1995)

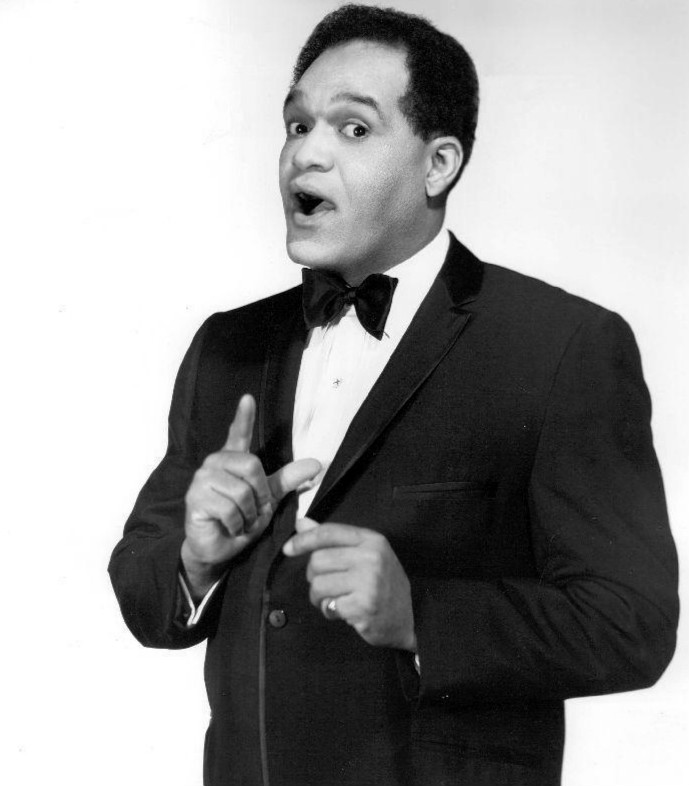
- White in 1971
- Born: Melvin Edward White; September 27, 1921; Baltimore, Maryland, U.S.
- Died: November 7, 1995 (aged 74); Brigantine, New Jersey, U.S.
- Occupations: Actor; comedian
- Spouse: LaVern Baker (m. 1961; div. 1969)

Comedy career
- Years active: 1940–1995
- Medium: Stage; film; television

Melvin Edward "Slappy" White (September 27, 1921 – November 7, 1995) was an American comedian and actor. He worked with Redd Foxx on the Chitlin' Circuit of stand-up comedy during the 1950s and 1960s. He appeared on the television shows Sanford and Son, That's My Mama, Blossom, and Cybill and in the films Mr. Saturday Night and Amazon Women on the Moon.

== Biography ==
White was born in Baltimore, Maryland, on September 27, 1921, with his official biography reporting that he "ran away to join the circus" as a child. White was born near the old Royal Theatre in Baltimore, where by the age of 10, he used to dance outside for coins and sold candy at the theater. He left Baltimore at the age of 13 because he was in danger of being sent to reform school because of his school absences. White joined a traveling carnival and made a living as a tap dancer with the troupe. He was eventually picked up by police and returned to his family, but could not trade show business for school. He received his nickname from the manager of a local theater where he entered a talent contest with a friend; the manager billed them as "Slap and Happy".

== Career ==
He began his career as a dancer and did not turn to comedy until 1940 when he joined with a fellow hoofer in the "Two Zephyrs" to replace one of its members who had previously passed away. White and his partner, Clarence Schelle, had appeared on The Major Bowes Amateur Hour. The "Two Zephyrs" made the circuits together for over four years appearing with such notables as Lionel Hampton, Count Basie, Duke Ellington and many others. With his team "Slappy" was first introduced to Californians, making his West Coast debut in Los Angeles at the Orpheum Theatre along with Louis Armstrong.

After "Two Zephyrs" came "Lewis and White" his second successful comedy team. "Lewis and White" traveled together for several years and appeared with such greats as Johnny Otis, The Ink Spots, Count Basie, Duke Ellington and Lionel Hampton. Lewis and White made a television appearance on The Morey Amsterdam Show.

The team with which he is best known is "Redd Foxx and 'Slappy' White". Foxx and White met in Harlem in 1947 and formed a comedy team. They toured from coast to coast with the Billy Eckstine Orchestra for more than four years. Some years before, White had met and married Pearl Bailey, when both of them were still relatively unknown professionally. Bailey's career was on the rise; she was performing in the better nightclubs with people like Duke Ellington and Cab Calloway while White was still struggling in lesser venues. The marriage was in trouble at the time White and Foxx first met. The couple divorced. Years later, when White and dancer Bill Bailey, who was Pearl's brother, teamed up for an act, White joked that the act would be billed as "Rev. Bill Bailey and his ex-brother-in-law".

"Slappy's" solo career started in 1951 when Dinah Washington requested him to introduce her act at the Black Hawk in San Francisco. White started out as a chauffeur to the singer, entertaining her with jokes as he drove. When she was late arriving on stage one evening, Washington, worried about the waiting audience, asked White to go on stage and "say something funny" while she prepared for her performance. "Slappy" was such a hit with the patrons, she kept him on as her opening act. He was once also married to Rock and Roll Hall of Fame inductee and blues belter, LaVern Baker (1929–1997).

White was a performer in Las Vegas for many years. In the 1950s while he was on the bill with Dinah Washington, White performed his routine which made the nightclub's manager the target of his jokes. While there was nothing offensive about the jokes White told, there was an unwritten rule about black comedians targeting whites in this manner. The manager fired White, but changed his mind about the comedian's employment when Dinah Washington indicated she would withdraw her entire act because of White's firing. White spent four years with Dinah Washington before establishing himself as a solo act.

White wrote and performed a comedy routine called "Brotherhood Creed" using one black and one white glove while reciting his poem about equality between men. White performed the routine many times during the civil rights movement in America, and President John F. Kennedy once gave it a personal commendation. In 1965, White was invited to perform the "Brotherhood Creed" before the Massachusetts State Senate. He was also well known as a comedian who eschewed offensive material in his nightclub act.

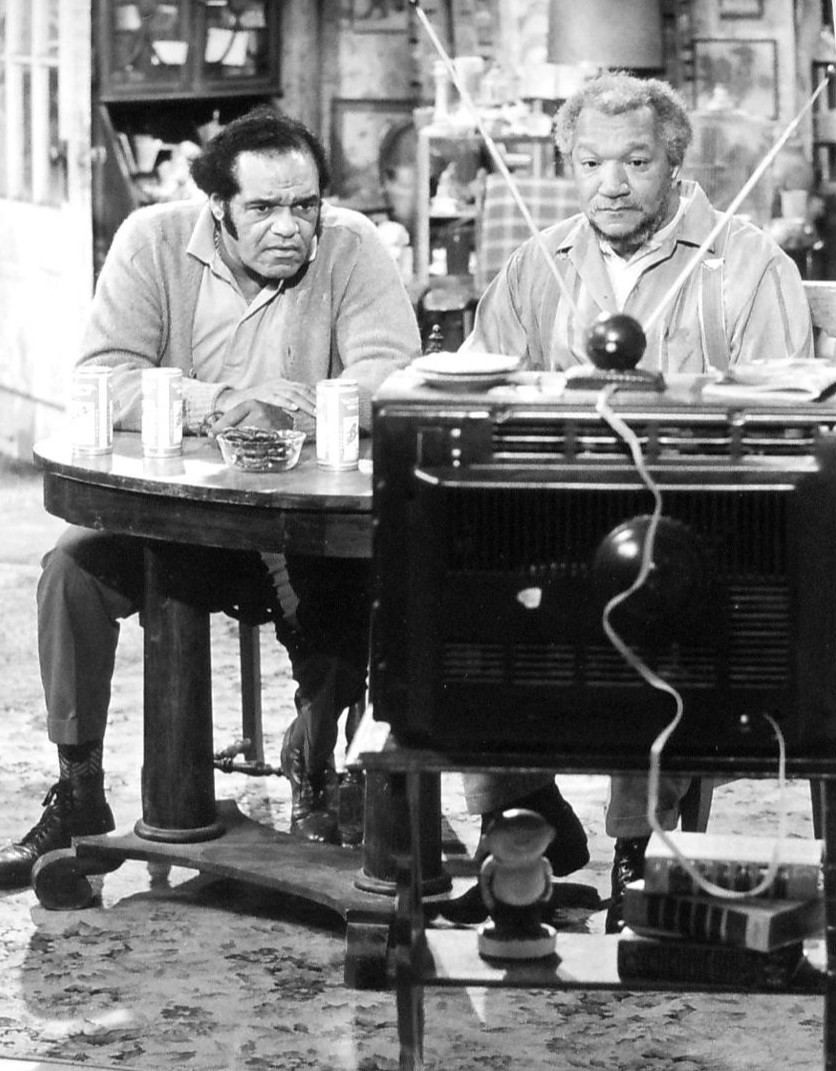
White (left) as Fred's friend, Melvin, on Sanford and Son in 1972.

In 1969, he formed a new comedy team called Rossi and White with Steve Rossi, who formerly worked with Marty Allen. The pair entertained at the White House in May of the same year. Rossi and White also performed their act aboard a National Overseas Airlines flight from Chicago to Spain. The airline had hoped that providing live entertainment on their flights would boost ticket sales.

Later in life, he performed under his given name on his friend Redd Foxx's TV show Sanford and Son as Fred's friend, also named Melvin, and had a million-dollar contract to perform at the Flamingo Hotel in Las Vegas in 1973.

In 1986 Milton Berle planned to introduce a new situation comedy called Moscow & Vine, with White as his co-star on the show. White's role was to be that of Berle's old vaudeville partner and as an employee in the music store owned by Berle's character. At one time, Berle hoped to syndicate the program.

White was best known in later years for the Friars' Club roasts, where he routinely appeared along with other comedians, including Milton Berle, Jackie Vernon, Pat Buttram and Dick Shawn. White enjoyed a minor renaissance after his death owing to bootleg recordings of Friars' Club roasts that became available through comedy record outlets. His name was used on an episode of Seinfeld entitled "The Money", in which Seinfeld uses "Slappy White" as his own name.

== Death ==
White died of a heart attack at his home in Brigantine, New Jersey, just 38 days after the death of his long-time friend George Kirby. At the time of his death, White was preparing to retire from acting and was in the process of moving from Los Angeles to New Jersey. He had no children from either of his marriages.

== Partial filmography ==
- 1970 The Man from O.R.G.Y.
- 1972 Sanford and Son, as an old friend of Fred's named Melvin
- 1974 Amazing Grace
- 1981 White and Reno
- 1986 Playboy Comedy Roast for Tommy Chong
- 1987 Amazon Women on the Moon
- 1992 Mr. Saturday Night, cameo part in the New York Friars' Club scene
