= Winifred Freedman =

American actress and singer (born 1957)

- Born: Granite City, Illinois, U.S.
- Occupation: Actor
- Years active: 1982–present

Winifred Freedman is an American actress and singer primarily known for her roles in television shows.

== Life and career ==
Born in Granite City, Illinois, Freedman attended Granite City High School, graduating in 1975. She graduated with a degree in theater from Northwestern University in 1979. During her time at the university, Freedman was "Winnie the Wildcat", the team's co-ed mascot of the late 1970s. She was elected homecoming queen in 1978.

Freedman is perhaps best known for playing Annette Mastorelli, Chachi Arcola's cousin and bass guitar-playing bandmate, in Joanie Loves Chachi (1982–83), the short-lived spin-off of Happy Days. After Joanie Loves Chachi ended, she was a regular on the equally short-lived syndicated soap opera, Rituals (1984–85), as Patty DuPont, a plain-Jane (but very hard working) boarding school student who later became the personal assistant to Taylor Chapin (Jo Ann Pflug; Tina Louise) and would go on to marry a man named Bernhard Kraus (Cameron Smith). Between 1986 and 1989, she appeared in six episodes of Mr. Belvedere as Kevin's classmate, Wendy.

Freedman has landed roles in a number of films throughout her career, starting with The Last American Virgin in 1982. Her other film credits include My Man Adam (1985), Reform School Girls (1986), You Can't Hurry Love (1988), The Naked Gun: From the Files of Police Squad! (1988), Hero and the Terror (1988), The Fabulous Baker Boys (1989), The Shrink Is In (2001) and Evolution (2001).

Since 2001, Freedman's television appearances have become more sporadic, guest-starring in shows like JAG (2004), Desperate Housewives (2006), Without a Trace (2008), Major Crimes (2013) and Young Sheldon (2019).

Freedman has also starred in plays, such as Design for Living in 1982 and Found a Peanut in 1986, the latter in which she played an eight-year-old girl. Eugene Kenneth Hanson of The Desert Sun wrote that she "underplays her part in a very expert way." She and others in the cast of Annie Evans' Ghost Stories in 1989 were noted to "lack the presence and originality to fire up the show." Her work as Delightful in Dearly Departed was noticed by T.H. McCulloh in the Los Angeles Times.

She is married to Scott Harlan.

She is on the Granite City School District's Wall of Fame.

== Partial filmography ==
Film

- The Last American Virgin (1982) – Millie
- My Man Adam (1985) – Amanda
- Crossroads (1986) – Nurse #4
- Reform School Girls (1986) – Terri
- Ratboy (1986) – Girlfriend
- You Can't Hurry Love (1988) – Sample Videotape #2
- Hero and the Terror (1988) – Gina
- The Naked Gun: From the Files of Police Squad! (1988) – Stephanie
- CHUD II: Bud the CHUD (1989) – Ticket Taker
- The Fabulous Baker Boys (1989) – Bad Singer
- Limit Up (1989) – Pit Recorder
- The Shrink Is In (2001) – Mrs. Dopalla
- Evolution (2001) – Debbi

Television

- Happy Days (1982) – Annette Mastorelli; 1 episode
- Joanie Loves Chachi (1982–83) – Anette Mastorelli; 17 episodes
- Rituals (1984–85) – Patty DuPont; unknown episodes
- The Ellen Burstyn Show (1986) – Carrie; 2 episodes
- Mr. Belvedere (1986–89) – Wendy; 6 episodes
- 21 Jump Street (1987) – Margie; episode 1x06
- Revenge of the Nerds III: The Next Generation (1992) – Operator; TV movie
