= The Last American Virgin =

1982 US sex comedy film by Boaz Davidson

- Theatrical release poster
- Directed by: Boaz Davidson
- Written by: Boaz Davidson
- Produced by: Yoram Globus; Menahem Golan; David Womark
- Starring: Lawrence Monoson; Diane Franklin; Steve Antin; Joe Rubbo; Louisa Moritz
- Cinematography: Adam Greenberg
- Edited by: Bruria Davidson
- Distributed by: The Cannon Group, Inc.
- Release date: July 30, 1982
- Running time: 92 minutes
- Country: United States
- Language: English
- Box office: $5.8 million

The Last American Virgin is a 1982 American coming-of-age sex comedy film written and directed by Boaz Davidson, and starring Lawrence Monoson, Diane Franklin, Steve Antin, Joe Rubbo, and Louisa Moritz. A remake of Davidson's 1978 Israeli film Lemon Popsicle, it follows a Los Angeles high school student who, while attempting to lose his virginity, falls in love with one of his female classmates as she begins dating his rebellious best friend.

After the success of the original film and its sequels in Israel, Davidson re-teamed with producers Golan-Globus to attempt to recreate the same success in the United States. Though the film's plot and characters remained largely the same, the setting was updated from 1950s Israel to then-present day suburban Los Angeles of the 1980s. The soundtrack, a major facet of both films, was also updated from the original's golden oldies to more contemporary new wave rock.

Released in the summer of 1982, The Last American Virgin received mixed reviews from critics, with some noting its nuanced portrayal of teenagers, and others deriding it for its crude sexual humor. In the years since its release, the film has been noted for its downbeat conclusion and has acquired a cult following.

== Plot ==
In early 1980s L.A., high school student Gary works as a pizza delivery boy for Pink Pizza after school. His best friends are Rick, a slick-talking ladies' man, and the obese David. While at a soda shop one night, Gary notices Karen, a new student who has just moved to the area, and her new best friend, Rose. Gary instantly falls in love with Karen. Afterward, Gary meets up with Rick and David inside the soda shop, and the three boys pick up three girls with the false promise of offering them cocaine. At Gary's house, the boys present Sweet'n Low to the girls, who snort it. Rick and David prepare to have sex with two of the girls, leaving Gary paired with the overweight Millie. As Gary attempts to cut off Millie's bra with scissors, his parents return home, stopping his plans and forcing him and his friends to flee.

In the locker room at school the next day, Gary, Rick, David, and others find their classmate Victor spying on the girls' locker room through a peephole and tease him. Angry, Victor asserts he has a larger penis than all of them, prompting the boys to have a contest where they measure each other's erections to see whose is largest.

A love triangle develops between Gary, Rick, and Karen. To complicate matters, Karen’s best friend Rose also ends up falling for Gary. After obtaining Karen's address through David, Gary drives to her house one morning and deflates her bike tires so he can offer her a ride to school. During and after the ride, Gary tries to woo Karen and invites her to a party at David's house, but she does not reciprocate his feelings. That evening, Gary attends the party and is devastated to find Karen with Rick. Rose tries to dance with Gary and woo him over, but he isn't interested. As Rick and Karen dance together, they kiss, marking the beginning of their relationship. Gary tries to entice Karen away from Rick, but fails. After Gary becomes drunk and makes a fool of himself, David tells him to go home and sleep it off, but when Gary arrives home, he creates an embarrassing scene in front of his parents' dinner guests.

One day, Gary delivers pizza to a lonely customer named Carmela, a lovely Latina whose sailor boyfriend is never home. She tells him she wants more than pizza and tries to entice him into her bedroom. Afraid to follow through, he leaves after the pizza delivery and convinces his friends to return to her house with him. They all drive back to her, and she dances a striptease and provides alcoholic beverages to the boys. She then lures them to her bedroom one by one. Carmela has sex with Rick and David, but before Gary has his shot, Carmela’s boyfriend Paco returns home, prompting the boys to flee the house as fast as they can, and they speed away in Gary’s car.

To keep Rick and Karen apart, Gary and David persuade Rick to join them with a prostitute known to work a busy highway corner in the neighborhood. They all have a tryst with her, chipping in for the cost of her services. Gary is pushed to go first, and his encounter with her is awkward and unpleasant, causing him to vomit. The next day at school, all three boys realize they have contracted pubic lice after the events of that night. After trying unsuccessfully to drown them in a public swimming pool, they have to bring their problem to a middle-aged pharmacist who is amused that such young boys have "crabs" and sells them all medication to eradicate the problem.

One night, Gary goes to the soda shop and searches for Karen after seeing her bike parked outside. Victor and David reveal that Rick took her off to the high school football field, and Victor says it’s for the purpose of taking her virginity. Gary races to the football field in an attempt to stop Rick and Karen, but is unable to find them. Meanwhile, Rick and Karen have sex for the first time inside the press box. Afterwards, Rick and Karen go to the soda shop, where Gary is sulking by himself. After Rick reveals he had sex with Karen, Gary angrily storms away and drives home.

Some time later, Gary notices Rick and Karen arguing in the school library before Karen leaves in distress. When Gary goes to comfort her as she cries by her locker, Karen reveals that she's pregnant. Enraged, Gary confronts Rick back in the library. Rick tells Gary that he's done with Karen and suggests that he wasn't the only guy Karen had sex with. A physical fight ensues, during which Rick accuses Gary of being jealous, and Gary denounces Rick as a lowlife before classmates intervene and break up the fight.

Many of the high school students head off on a ski trip during Christmas break, including Rick and his new girlfriend. Gary lies to his parents about going on the trip and instead takes Karen to his late grandmother's house, which has been unoccupied since her death. Gary decides to pay for Karen to have an abortion by selling most of his possessions and borrowing money from his boss. After the abortion, Gary cares for Karen at his grandmother's house while she recovers. The following morning, Karen invites Gary to her 18th birthday party. While packing up their belongings later that night, Karen tells Gary she appreciates everything he has done for her and calls him a "true friend," prompting Gary to confess his love for her. Karen appears to reciprocate, and they kiss. Before Karen's birthday party, Gary scrapes together enough money to buy her an engraved gold locket.

When Gary arrives at Karen's birthday party, his hopes for a lasting romance with her are shattered when he walks into the kitchen and finds her making out with Rick. As Karen embraces Rick, she notices Gary, and Rick turns to face him as well. Gary leaves the party without speaking to either of them, taking Karen's gift with him. He drives home alone, heartbroken, with tears streaming down his face.

== Cast ==
- Lawrence Monoson as Gary
- Diane Franklin as Karen
- Steve Antin as Rick
- Joe Rubbo as David
- Louisa Moritz as Carmela
- Brian Peck as Victor
- Kimmy Robertson as Rose
- Tessa Richarde as Brenda
- Winifred Freedman as Millie
- Gerri Idol as Roxanne
- Phil Rubenstein as Gino
- Zach Mahoney as Big Meat
- Roberto Rodriquez as Paco
- Harry Bugin as Doctor

== Production ==
=== Development ===
The film was directed by Boaz Davidson, and is a remake of his 1978 Israeli film Lemon Popsicle, which features a similar plot. Lemon Popsicle had been produced by Yoram Globus and Menahem Golan, who had then recently acquired the American film distribution company Cannon Films. Davidson, Globus, and Golan developed the project, with Davidson retooling some elements to appeal to an American audience.

=== Casting ===
Davidson intentionally sought inexperienced teenage actors to appear in the film, and held casting calls in New York City, Chicago, and Los Angeles. Lawrence Monoson, who had originally auditioned for a minor part, was selected by Davidson to star as Gary, beating out 200 other actors contending for the role. The film marked the debuts of several actors, including Joe Rubbo, Steve Antin, Kimmy Robertson, and Winifred Freedman.

=== Filming ===
Principal photography of The Last American Virgin began in late 1981 in Los Angeles and Malibu. Birmingham High School and Reseda High School served as the principal locations for the school sequences. Approximately seventy percent of the film was shot using handheld cameras. Filming was completed in early 1982, with some additional photography occurring in New York City.

== Release ==
=== Box office ===
The Last American Virgin opened regionally in several U.S. cities on July 30, 1982. It premiered in Los Angeles on September 24, 1982, and in New York City on January 14, 1983.

The film remained in theatrical circulation for 21 weeks, with its widest release comprising 158 theaters. By its tenth week of release in October 1982, the film had ranked at number eleven at the U.S. box office. It ultimately grossed a total of $5,829,781 domestically.

=== Critical response ===
Candice Russell of the Sun Sentinel praised the film as humorous and distinctive from other teen films of the time, such as Porky's (1981) and Fast Times at Ridgemont High (1982), adding: "The awkwardness, frailty and passion of young people is portrayed with uncommon honesty. There isn't a patronizing or false line of dialogue in the whole film."

Linda Gross of the Los Angeles Times disliked the film, finding moments of it "distasteful and offensive", summarizing it overall as "conventionally and crudely told." The Atlanta Constitution's Eleanor Rigel similarly felt the film was "needlessly tasteless" and "completely wastes a potentially interesting theme as well as some acceptable performances by its cast of newcomers." The film's depiction of an abortion also garnered it some controversy.

Responding to criticism dismissing The Last American Virgin as distasteful, critic Noel Murray of The A.V. Club commented: "Really, the film's frankness makes it more honest than its dreamy-eyed descendants; even the shallow treatment of girls captures the point of view of a luckless teenage boy."

In an essay written a quarter-century after its release, critic Andy Selsberg noted that, unlike the other teen sex comedies of the 1980s, The Last American Virgin was the only one truthful enough to have a "main character... left longing for his dream girl", whereas all the others were "acheless". In another retrospective assessment for MovieWeb, Evan Jacobs lauded the film for its conclusion, describing it as "nothing short of soul crushing.... the ending is truly what makes The Last American Virgin a special film... it elicits the same feelings no matter how many times you watch it, this supposedly disposable movie (from Cannon Films no less!) rises to the level of art." Writing for Birth.Movies.Death, Todd Gilchrist notes of the film's conclusion: "The first time you see this, it’s shocking, almost laughable. But subsequent viewings of the movie expose just how calculated and methodical its escalation is over the course of its running time, watching these kids playing at being adults, then having to deal with the real consequences of their actions, and finally, being confronted by the emotional realities of a world that can and will betray their best intentions and deepest desires."

As of June 2023, The Last American Virgin holds a 77% rating on review aggregator Rotten Tomatoes based on thirteen reviews.

=== Home media ===
The film was released on VHS, Betamax and CED Videodisc by Cannon Films in 1983. The film was released by Guild Home Video on LaserDisc with a digital stereo soundtrack in 1984.

MGM Home Entertainment released the film on DVD in 2003. Arrow Films released a Blu-ray and DVD combination edition in the United Kingdom in 2013, followed by a North American Blu-ray released in 2015 by Olive Films. In January 2023, MVD Visual, in association with MGM, released a new special edition Blu-ray.

== Soundtrack ==
The Last American Virgin

Soundtrack album by Various Artists
- Released: 1982
- Recorded: 1980–1982
- Genre: Rock
- Length: 37:02
- Label: Columbia JS 38279

Side 1
No.	Title	Artist	Length
1.	"Teen Angel Eyes"	Tommy Tutone	3:30
2.	"De Do Do Do, De Da Da Da"	The Police	4:07
3.	"Whip It"	Devo	2:38
4.	"When I Find You"	Phil Seymour	5:13
5.	"Better Luck Next Time"	Oingo Boingo	3:30

Side 2
No.	Title	Artist	Length
6.	"Are You Ready for the Sex Girls?"	Gleaming Spires	4:00
7.	"Since You're Gone"	The Cars	3:30
8.	"I Know What Boys Like"	The Waitresses	3:14
9.	"Airwaves"	The Fortune Band	3:46
10.	"I Will Follow"	U2	3:34

Additional songs in the film include:

- "In the Flesh" - Blondie
- "Oh No" - The Commodores
- "Open Arms" - Journey
- "Keep on Loving You" - REO Speedwagon
- "Just Once" - Quincy Jones feat. James Ingram
- "That's the Way (I Like It)" - KC and the Sunshine Band
- "Love Action (I Believe in Love)" - The Human League
- "Shake It Up" - The Cars
- "Besame Mucho & Granada"- Los Fabulosos 3 Paraguayos
- "It Aint Easy Comin' Down" - Charlene
- "Zero Hour" - The Plimsouls
- "España cañí" - The Dancing Brass

The 1982 Japanese release of the soundtrack (Polydor 28MM 0206) replaced the Tommy Tutone track with The Human League's recording of "Love Action (I Believe in Love)". While "Just Once", which featured prominently over the final scene, was not included on the soundtrack album, Ingram was nominated for Best Male Pop Vocal Performance at the 1982 Grammy Awards.

On all DVD and Blu-ray releases, at request of the band themselves, "Love Action" has been omitted and replaced with a repeated use of "Whip It" by Devo in one scene. The original MGM VHS tape has the original song intact though.

== Sources ==
- Trunick, Austin (2020). The Cannon Film Guide: Volume I, 1980–1984. Orlando, Florida: BearManor Media. ISBN 978-1-629-33581-0.
