= Allan Kayser =

American film and TV actor (born 1963)

- Born: December 18, 1963 (age 62); Littleton, Colorado, U.S.
- Education: Columbine High School
- Alma mater: Central Missouri State University
- Years active: 1980–present
- Spouse: Sara Kayser

Allan Joseph Kayser II (born December 18, 1963) is an American film and TV actor.

== Biography ==
Kayser was born and raised in Littleton, Colorado, and attended Columbine High School from 1978 to 1982. Shortly after graduating, Kayser moved to Los Angeles, and began his acting career. He was a part of several motion pictures in the 1980s, including Hot Chili and Night of the Creeps. However, Kayser is perhaps best known for starring as Bubba in 95 episodes of the American television sitcom Mama's Family from 1986 to 1990, making him a teen idol in the 1980s. In 1989, Kayser was nominated for a Young Artist Award as Best Young Actor Guest Starring in a Drama or Comedy Series for his part as Bubba Higgins in Mama's Family.

Kayser was previously married to Lori Kayser; with whom he had 2 children. As of August 23, 2014, he is married to Sara Kayser. The couple also had 2 children.

== Honors ==
Kayser was inducted into the Missouri Walk of Fame at the annual Missouri Cherry Blossom Festival, located in Marshfield, Missouri, in 2022.

== Filmography ==
Film

- Hot Chili (Jason) – 1985
- Night of the Creeps (Brad) – 1986
- Journey of the Heart (Glen) – 1997
- Double Teamed (Nicky's Dad) – 2002
- More Than Puppy Love (Tony) – 2002
- Shimmer (Eric McKenzie) – 2006
- All Roads Lead Home (Tobias) – 2008
- Next Caller (Handsome Billy Bob Brown) – 2009
- House of Forbidden Secrets (Brad) – 2013
- House of the Witch Doctor (Cliff Rifton) – 2013

Television

- Mama's Family (Bubba Higgins) (95 episodes, 1986–90)

Guest appearances

- The $25,000 Pyramid (5 appearances, 1987)
- The New Hollywood Squares (2 appearances, 1987 and 1989)
- Circus of the Stars #14 (1989)
- Vicki! (Vicki Lawrence's talk show, 1992)
