= Mama's Family =

American sitcom (1983–1990)

- Genre: Sitcom
- Created by: Dick Clair; Jenna McMahon
- Directed by: Roger Beatty; Harvey Korman; Dick Martin; Dave Powers
- Starring: Vicki Lawrence; Ken Berry; Dorothy Lyman; Beverly Archer; Allan Kayser; Rue McClanahan; Eric Brown; Karin Argoud; Betty White
- Theme music composer: Music: Peter Matz; Lyrics: Vicki Lawrence
- Opening theme: "Bless My Happy Home"
- Country of origin: United States
- Original language: English
- No. of seasons: 6
- No. of episodes: 130 (list of episodes)

Production
- Executive producer: Joe Hamilton
- Producers: Jim Evering; Neil Lebowitz; Dave Powers; Fred Rubin; Robert Wright
- Production locations: CBS Television City; Hollywood, California (1983–84); Metromedia Square; Hollywood, California (1986–90)
- Camera setup: Multi-camera
- Running time: 24–25 minutes (NBC episodes); 21–22 minutes (syndicated episodes)
- Production company: Joe Hamilton Productions

Original release
- Network: NBC (1983–1984); Syndicated (1986–1990)
- Release: January 22, 1983 – February 24, 1990

Related
- Eunice

Mama's Family is an American sitcom television series starring Vicki Lawrence as Mama (Thelma Harper). The series is a spin-off of a recurring series of comedy sketches called "The Family" featured on The Carol Burnett Show (1967–1978) and Carol Burnett & Company (1979). The sketches led to the television film Eunice, and finally the television series.

Mama's Family aired for a total of six seasons. It originally aired on NBC for two seasons, debuting for the 1982–1983 season on January 22, 1983. After several time slot changes and moderate ratings, the network cancelled the series; the final episode of this two-season NBC incarnation of the series aired on April 7, 1984. NBC broadcast reruns of the show for another year, until September 1985, which performed well in ratings.

Two years after its NBC cancellation, original series producer Joe Hamilton Productions (JHP) revived Mama's Family for new episodes in first-run syndication on local stations across the United States. The revival, distributed by Lorimar-Telepictures, premiered on September 27, 1986. The revival earned higher ratings than the previous two-year season run on NBC, thus the first-run syndicated version of the series ran for an additional four seasons giving the series a total of a six-season run. Mama's Family became the highest-rated sitcom in first-run syndication at that time. The series final episode aired on February 24, 1990.

The show's theme song is "Bless My Happy Home", created as an a cappella by Lawrence. The show's producers chose to use an instrumental of Lawrence's song composed by Peter Matz. Disclosing the lyrics to the song as part of her Vicki and Mama: A Two Woman Show (untelevised stand-up comedy routine Lawrence has hosted as herself and Mama since 2001), Lawrence routinely performs the song in its original a cappella form. The lyrics were also featured in an advertisement for the show on MeTV.

== Overview ==
The show is set in the city of Raytown, which actress Vicki Lawrence later revealed to be Raytown, Missouri, a suburb of Kansas City (although the script writing suggests the setting was Raytown, Mississippi, given the rural Southern nature of the series). The television series revolves around the wacky misadventures of the Harper family, extended non-Harper family members and their neighbor friend in later seasons. Always at the center of all the trouble, turmoil and misunderstandings is head of the clan and matriarch Thelma Harper (Mama)—a thickset, gray-haired, purse-lipped, mid-to-late 60s widow who is portrayed as explosively quick tempered, abrasive, and brash.

Mama's snappy retorts and wisecracks are featured in a running gag in which the final scene of each episode cuts to an exterior shot of her residence (1027 Montrose Avenue in South Pasadena) while Mama's voice is heard making a sharp or witty reply to whoever had previously spoken. This is then followed by audience laughter and applause. In spite of Thelma's derogatory attitude, regular zingers and sarcasm, she is nurturing and obliging at heart, allowing family members to live off her in her home who would otherwise have no place to live, while also regularly cooking for and cleaning up after them.

== Network run (seasons 1–2) ==
Characters of the first incarnation of Mama's Family (clockwise from bottom left): Buzz, Vinton, Naomi, Ed (recurring character), Ellen (recurring), Fran, Sonja, and Thelma

=== Beginning the series ===
In the ninth season of The Carol Burnett Show, producer Joe Hamilton wanted to spin off Mama into her own series, but Lawrence turned him down. She did not wish to wear a "fat suit portraying an old lady every week", and she had misgivings about playing the role without Harvey Korman (who played Mama's son-in-law, Ed Higgins) and Carol Burnett (who played Mama's daughter Eunice Higgins) regularly by her side as in "The Family" sketches. Burnett and Korman told Lawrence that they would only appear as guest stars on the new series, and that it was Lawrence's time to shine and take what she had learned from The Carol Burnett Show and make it on her own. Shortly after the highly rated Eunice TV movie, with continued urging by Korman and Burnett, Lawrence finally changed her mind and accepted the offer for her character's own sitcom.

The writers had created Raytown to be its own "cartoon-like" world outside of reality. Although the series was sold to NBC without a pilot, the network had its own requirements, such as having "normal" teenagers as seen in other sitcoms of the time, which is how the Buzz and Sonja characters came about. However, Lawrence had a great deal of creative input and made many important decisions, including bringing in Korman very early on to co-direct the series. Lawrence objected to the original script of the episode "Mama Cries Uncle", in which Thelma's brother-in-law visits and the two supposedly wound up sleeping together:

I went to the writers and I said, "I'm sorry, she is nothing if not Bible Belt. She would never sleep with her brother-in-law. I don't care how dead her husband is, This is wrong, wrong, wrong, wrong". Well, threw everything into a tizzy and Joe [Hamilton] said, "Gotta listen to her," and they re-wrote the second half of the show.

According to her autobiography, Lawrence had a problem with the decision to tape the series on Stage 33 at CBS Television City, where The Carol Burnett Show was produced.

=== Plot details ===
For 1½ seasons from 1983 through 1984, Mama's Family ran on NBC. In the series' first episode, Thelma Harper lives with her uncomfortable, uptight spinster sister Fran (Rue McClanahan), a journalist for a local paper. Thelma's son Vinton (whose wife Mitzi had left him to become a cocktail waitress in Las Vegas) arrives to inform Thelma that he and his two children, Sonja and Buzz, have been evicted from their home and need a place to stay. Much to Fran's chagrin, Thelma allows the trio to move in.

During the first season, Vinton forged a relationship with the Harpers' flirtatious next-door neighbor Naomi Oates, whom Thelma disliked, and soon married her. After selling Naomi's house and losing the money in a bad business deal, Naomi and Vint are forced to move into Thelma's basement, where they remain for most of the show's run. Also seen on a recurring basis were Thelma's two daughters: the snobbish Ellen (Betty White) and the ornery Eunice (Carol Burnett). Korman, who directed many of the earlier episodes, made featured appearances as Eunice's husband, Ed Higgins. (During the eleventh and final season of The Carol Burnett Show, the Ed Higgins character left Eunice and was written out of "The Family" skits.)

=== Opening sequence ===
Korman appeared at the beginning of each episode as the stuffed shirt Alistair Quince (a parody of Alistair Cooke), who would soberly introduce the program in the style of Masterpiece Theatre. These monologues were cut out of the later syndicated reruns. Korman also performed the voice of Thelma's unseen late husband, Carl, in flashback episodes.

An extended version of the show's opening theme song, with repeated melodies, was used during the original NBC run, but was never used in reruns.

The house and neighborhood shown in the opening credits differed between the original NBC run and the syndicated run, leading to discrepancies such as in the episode "Mama for Mayor", in which Mama is shown in front of a house similar to the one used in the original opening theme of the first two seasons, though there are noticeable differences as it is not the same house.

In 2013, StarVista Entertainment released the original NBC seasons with the Alistair Quince intros and original opening credits intact, except for two episodes in Season 1 ("Cellmates" and "Mama's Boyfriend"), as the masters of those episodes are lost and were replaced by the syndicated version in the re-release.

=== Cancellation ===
While not a huge ratings success, the first season garnered solid enough numbers to justify being renewed for a second season. For instance, the premiere episode ranked #25 for the week with an 18.6 rating and a 28 share. However, during the second season, the show dropped out of the top 50 shows, losing share to CBS' hit Magnum, P.I. As a result, NBC canceled the series in May 1984.

== First-run syndication (seasons 3–6) ==
Characters of the reincarnation of Mama's Family (clockwise from center left): Iola, Bubba, Vinton, Naomi, and Mama.

=== Series rebirth ===
After Mama's Family was canceled by NBC in 1984, it was later relaunched in first-run syndication in 1986. Lorimar Television had just merged with Telepictures and was looking for new projects for the growing first-run syndication market. After observing high ratings for NBC's Mama's Family in summer reruns, production staff decided that the show deserved a second chance and ordered 100 episodes for syndication. Bubba, the son of Ed and Eunice, comes to live with Thelma after his parents move away.

=== Absence of Carol Burnett as the "Eunice" character ===
According to Lawrence's autobiography, Vicki!: The True-Life Adventures of Miss Fireball, Burnett resented Lawrence for accepting the role of Mama for first-run syndication with producer Joe Hamilton (who owned the Mama's Family characters). It was during this time that Burnett was involved in an acrimonious divorce from Hamilton, who produced both The Carol Burnett Show and Mama's Family. Burnett felt Lawrence had been disloyal to her and held a grudge against her until Hamilton's death in 1991. Sometime after Hamilton's death, Burnett and Lawrence reconciled. Lawrence's autobiography reads:

A funny thing happened the day I signed with Lorimar. Carol called and said, 'I think I'd like to put together maybe a little syndicated show with the family characters. I'll do Eunice, you do Mama. Doesn't that sound like fun?' I said, 'It does, but I just signed with Lorimar to do Mama's Family for Joe.' It became a very abrupt conversation, and Carol hung up. I then went to Al and asked him what he made of the whole thing. He agreed it was really weird. I wondered if I was about to get caught in the middle of yet another struggle between the two of them . . . During her divorce, Carol and I went through a 'cool' period. She 'divorced' everyone and remained distant for a lot of years. She called the house a few years ago. I was standing at the sink peeling carrots, fifteen feet from the phone, but Garrett got to it first and I only heard his half of the following conversation: 'Hello? Oh hi. Yeah, sure, he's in the other room, on the other line. You want me to tell him you're calling? My mom's here, you want to talk to her? No? Okay. Goodbye.' When he hung up I asked him who it was. 'Carol Burnett.' I was shocked. 'What did she say?' 'She didn't want to talk to you. She only wanted to talk to Dad.' Al called her back later that night, made a point of telling her how much we missed and loved her, and she told him, 'I'll be back. It's just going to take a while longer. Give me another year or so."

=== Series end ===
After Mama's Family was picked up in first-run syndication, ratings for the series improved, becoming the highest-rated first-run program in syndication. According to Ken Berry, Lawrence had seemingly grown tired of playing the "Mama" role by 1990 and wanted to end the show. According to Lawrence, who would reprise Mama on stage for many years thereafter, the series ended because it had reached the standard threshold of 100 episodes, and the syndicator no longer needed to produce anymore, even though she would have wanted the show to continue.

== Cast ==
=== Thelma "Mama" Harper ===
Thelma Harper, better known as Mama, is the title character of Mama's Family and the widowed matriarch of a rural Southern family. In February 2013, Lawrence stated that "The Family" sketch version of Mama was created by Dick Clair and Jenna McMahon.

Actor	Character	Seasons					
Actor	Character	1	2	3	4	5	6
Vicki Lawrence	Thelma "Mama" Harper	Main	Main	Main	Main	Main	Main
Ken Berry	Vinton Harper	Main	Main	Main	Main	Main	Main
Dorothy Lyman	Naomi Oates Harper	Main	Main	Main	Main	Main	Main
Eric Brown	Vinton "Buzz" Harper Jr.	Main	Main				
Karin Argoud	Sonja Harper	Main	Main				
Rue McClanahan	Frances Marie Crowley	Main	Main				
Beverly Archer	Iola Boylan			Main	Main	Main	Main
Allan Kayser	Bubba Higgins			Main	Main	Main	Main
Carol Burnett	Eunice Harper Higgins	Recurring	Guest				
Harvey Korman	Ed Higgins / Alistair Quince	Recurring	Recurring				
Betty White	Ellen Harper-Jackson	Recurring	Recurring	Guest			

== Harper family tree ==
Mama Crowley and Frank Crowley*	Mammy and Willie Harper
Frances Crowley	Thelma Crowley	Carl Harper	Effie Harper	Roy Harper
Bruce Jackson	Ellen Harper	Eunice Harper	Ed Higgins	Mitzi (div.)	Vinton Harper	Naomi Oates	Leonard Oates (div.)
Bubba Higgins	Sonja Harper	Vinton "Buzz" Harper, Jr.	Tiffany Thelma Harper

- Magenta = Crowleys
- Orange = Harpers
- Blue = Harper children
- Red = Harper in-laws
- Green = Harper grandchildren

*Note: Thelma's mother was shown on two occasions on the show (once in a flashback and once as a ghost, played both times by Vicki Lawrence), but her name wasn't revealed. There were at least two Crowley brothers (mentioned in passing in "Double Standard" and "Mama with the Golden Arm"); one was named Clyde ("Pomp and Circumstance"). A cousin named Cora is seen in "There's No Place Like...No Place", and an Uncle Oscar is mentioned in "Mama Gets the Bird", but it is not known if he was from Thelma's side of the family or her husband Carl's. Eunice also mentions having a son named Billy, but Billy's whereabouts are unknown in Mama's Family.

== Episodes ==
Season	Episodes	First aired	Last aired	Network
1	13	January 22, 1983	May 7, 1983	NBC
2	22	September 29, 1983	April 7, 1984	NBC
3	25	September 27, 1986	March 28, 1987	Syndicated
4	25	September 26, 1987	March 26, 1988	Syndicated
5	25	November 5, 1988	May 27, 1989	Syndicated
6	20	September 23, 1989	February 24, 1990	Syndicated

Altogether, Mama's Family had six seasons consisting of 130 episodes. The show's first life consisted of 35 episodes, making for two seasons. The show's second life consisted of 95 episodes, making for four seasons.

=== Favorites of Vicki Lawrence ===
On September 30, 2013, Vicki Lawrence was asked what her favorite episodes of the series are:

- Lawrence answered that among the early seasons, her favorite is the episode "The Wedding (Part 2)." Her reason for favoring this episode is the big names featured in it. She listed Carol Burnett, Harvey Korman, Betty White, Ken Berry and Dorothy Lyman. In admiration, Lawrence remarked, "How much help does one girl get?" and "It's just an amazing supporting cast. Dear God, Carol was funny in that show!"
- Lawrence has described another favorite from the early seasons as the episode "Rashomama," which is a takeoff on the Japanese film Rashomon. The episode is about Mama getting hit with a kettle in the kitchen and it is her, Betty, Dorothy, and Carol. At the emergency room, the three of them all have different versions of what happened to Mama. Lawrence explained, "We redo the scene three different ways, and it's pretty funny."
- As other episode favorites, Lawrence has named "Family Feud" and "Mama on Jeopardy!" Lawrence stated she loved having this dysfunctional family sent out into the real world. In particular, she enjoyed the inclusion of game shows because "people know the format of these shows so perfectly, and to watch this crazy family get stuck in that format was really fun to me. Probably because I also love game shows so much."
- As another episode favorite, Lawrence named "The Love Letter". Stated Lawrence, "It was a great episode, a record-holder actually. I think Bubba writes a love letter for Vint, who is having some problems with Naomi. In the course of the 22-minute episode, everybody thinks that the love letter is meant for them. Mama thinks it is for her from the repair guy who is there. Iola is sure Vint has written it to her. The show actually ran 22 minutes with no costume changes or anything. I remember the night that we did it. We did it in 22 minutes and were out at 7:25, and our director said, 'Good night, you're done!'" Lawrence added, "Honestly, I have to say, by the time we finished the show, we had it down to a four-day workweek, so I kind of felt like we got paid to play dress up really."

== Ratings ==
- Season 1: #59
- Season 2: #66

== Home media ==
DVD Cover Art

DVD information
Mama's Family—The Complete First Season
- Release date: September 26, 2006
- Studio: Warner Home Video

On September 26, 2006, Warner Bros. Television released season 1 of Mama's Family on DVD. The DVD release features the syndicated versions of the episodes, which edits roughly three minutes from what originally aired. Warner Bros. claimed to only own the rights to the syndicated form.

Due to issues relating to ownership rights between the show's production companies, Mama's Family for a long time had difficulties coming out on DVD, with only its first season available for many years.

However, in May 2013, it was announced that StarVista Entertainment would release all 6 seasons of the sitcom to DVD, as well as a complete series box set, which was available only through the StarVista website. Most of the original unedited versions, dubbed "The Joe Hamilton Cuts," were presented on DVD. Included with the package were extras of over 10 hours of bonus material, as well as a new cast reunion with Vicki Lawrence and the show's syndicated cast members. In addition, StarVista offered a "Signature" collection of the entire series, autographed by Vicki Lawrence, which was limited to 500 copies.

In the fall of 2013, Star Vista began releasing individual season sets, Seasons 1 & 2 were released on September 10, 2013, followed by season 3 on February 25, 2014. Season 4 was released on June 24, 2014, Season 5 on September 23, 2014 and the sixth and final season was released on February 10, 2015. In conjunction with the complete seasons, Star Vista released a "best-of" single-disc unit for each season. Selected by Vicki Lawrence, each release has 6 (season 1 has 7) of her personal favorite episodes from each season.

Release	Ep #	DVD release date	Bonus features
The Complete 1st Season	13	September 26, 2006 (re-released September 10, 2013)	Featurette: Mama's Family Tree: The Branches (All About Eunice and Ellen) Family History: A Classic "Family" Sketch from The Carol Burnett Show, featuring Betty White
The Complete 2nd Season	22	September 10, 2013	The original TV movie Eunice Featurette: Mama's Family Tree: The Roots (all about Mama and Fran); Interviews: Vicki Lawrence interviews Mama; Vicki Lawrence and Carol Burnett; Betty White
The Complete 3rd Season	25	February 25, 2014	Family History: A Classic "Family" Sketch from The Carol Burnett Show, featuring Maggie Smith Featurette: Mama's Family Tree: The Sprouts (All about Bubba); Mama Knows Best: A Mama's Family Cast Reunion; Interview: Allan Kayser (Bubba)
The Complete 4th Season	25	June 24, 2014	Featurette: Mama's Family Tree: The Neighbors (All about Iola) Interview: Beverly Archer (Iola Boylen); Under One Roof: A Mama's Family Cast Reunion
The Complete 5th Season	25	September 23, 2014	Interviews: Vicki Lawrence; Dorothy Lyman; Ken Berry; Rick Hawkins
The Complete 6th Season	20	February 10, 2015	Interviews: Jim Evering; Manny Basanese; Vicki Lawrence and Rick Hawkins; Bob Mackie and Ret Turner
Mama's Family: Mama's Favorites (Season 1)	7	September 10, 2013	"Vint and the Kids Move In", "The Wedding, pt. 1", "The Wedding, pt. 2"; "Cellmates", "Family Feud", "Positive Thinking", "Mama's Boyfriend"
Mama's Family: Mama's Favorites (Season 2)	6	September 10, 2013	"Country Club", "Rashomama", "Aunt Gert Rides Again", "Mama Learns to Drive", "Mama Buys a Car", "Dear Aunt Fran"
Mama's Family: Mama's Favorites (Season 3)	6	September 9, 2014	"Soup to Nuts", "Cat's Meow", "Steal One, Pearl Two", "Where There's Smoke", "Birthright", "It Takes Two to Watusi"
Mama's Family: Mama's Favorites (Season 4)	6	January 27, 2015	"Zirconia's are a Girl's Best Friend", "Educating Mama", "The Sins of the Mother", "Mama on Jeopardy!", "Mama Goes Hawaiian, pt. 1", "Mama Goes Hawaiian, pt. 2"
Mama's Family: Mama's Favorites (Season 5)	6	April 28, 2015	"Naomi's New Position"; "The Really Loud Family", "Found Money", "Mama's Layaway Plan", "Mama in One", "Dependence Day"
Mama's Family: Mama's Favorites (Season 6)	6	July 28, 2015	"Mama Fights Back", "Bubba's House Band", "The Big Nap", "Pinup Mama", "Look Who's Breathing", "Bye-Bye Baby!"
The Complete Series	130	September 10, 2013 (online exclusive); September 23, 2014 (retail release)	

== Awards and nominations ==
=== Primetime Emmy Awards ===
Year	Category	Nominee(s)	Episodes(s)	Result
1983	Primetime Emmy Award for Outstanding Costumes for a Series	Bob Mackie and Ret Turner	for ""The Wedding: Part 2"	Nominated
1984	Primetime Emmy Award for Outstanding Costumes for a Series	Bob Mackie and Ret Turner	for "Mama's Birthday"	Won
1987	Primetime Emmy Award for Outstanding Costumes for a Series	Bob Mackie and Ret Turner	for "The Love Letter"	Nominated

=== TV Land Awards ===
Year	Category	Nominee(s)	Episodes(s)	Result
2004	Favorite "Big, Bad Momma"	Vicki Lawrence	N/A	Won

=== Young Artist Awards ===
Year	Category	Nominee(s)	Episodes(s)	Result
1984	Best Young Actress in a Comedy Series	Karin Argoud	N/A	Nominated
1984	Best Young Actor in a Comedy Series	Eric Brown	N/A	Nominated
1985	Best Young Actress – Guest in a Television Series	Tanya Fenmore	for "Mama's Birthday"	Nominated
1985	Best Young Actor – Guest in a Television Series	David Friedman	for "Mama's Birthday"	Nominated
1989	Best Young Actor Guest Starring in a Syndicated Comedy, Drama or Special	Ryan Bollman	for "Child's Play"	Nominated
1989	Best Young Actor Guest Starring in a Drama or Comedy Series	Allan Kayser	N/A	Nominated

== Syndication ==
After the series finale in 1990, the entire series (including the NBC episodes) was placed in off-network syndication, airing in most cities every weekday. Mama's Family also ran on TBS from January 1997 until August 2006 premiering weekday mornings. In October 1998, TBS aired a full hour of Mama's Family weekday afternoons at 6:05 pm/et and then moved the show to 4:05pm/et in November 1998. That same month, ION Television (formerly the PAX network) began airing reruns of the series. The show aired Monday through Friday at 8:00 to 9:00 pm from 2006 to 2008. ET.

In December 2006, CMT began re-airing the series.

On November 1, 2023, Pluto TV added all seasons of Mama's Family to its on demand service, however as of January 3, 2024, it offers only the last three seasons. It also airs on the Classic TV Families channel. The show aired on MeTV until its brief removal in 2025 but has since returned on September 13, 2026, airing Sundays at 3:00pm ET; it currently airs on its sister network Catchy Comedy weeknights at 6:00pm ET and Sundays from 5:00 to 7:00pm ET and cable network Logo.

== International versions ==
An Italian version called La mamma è sempre la mamma (Mom is always mom) aired on Odeon TV in 1988.

== Post-television show appearances of Thelma Harper/Mama ==
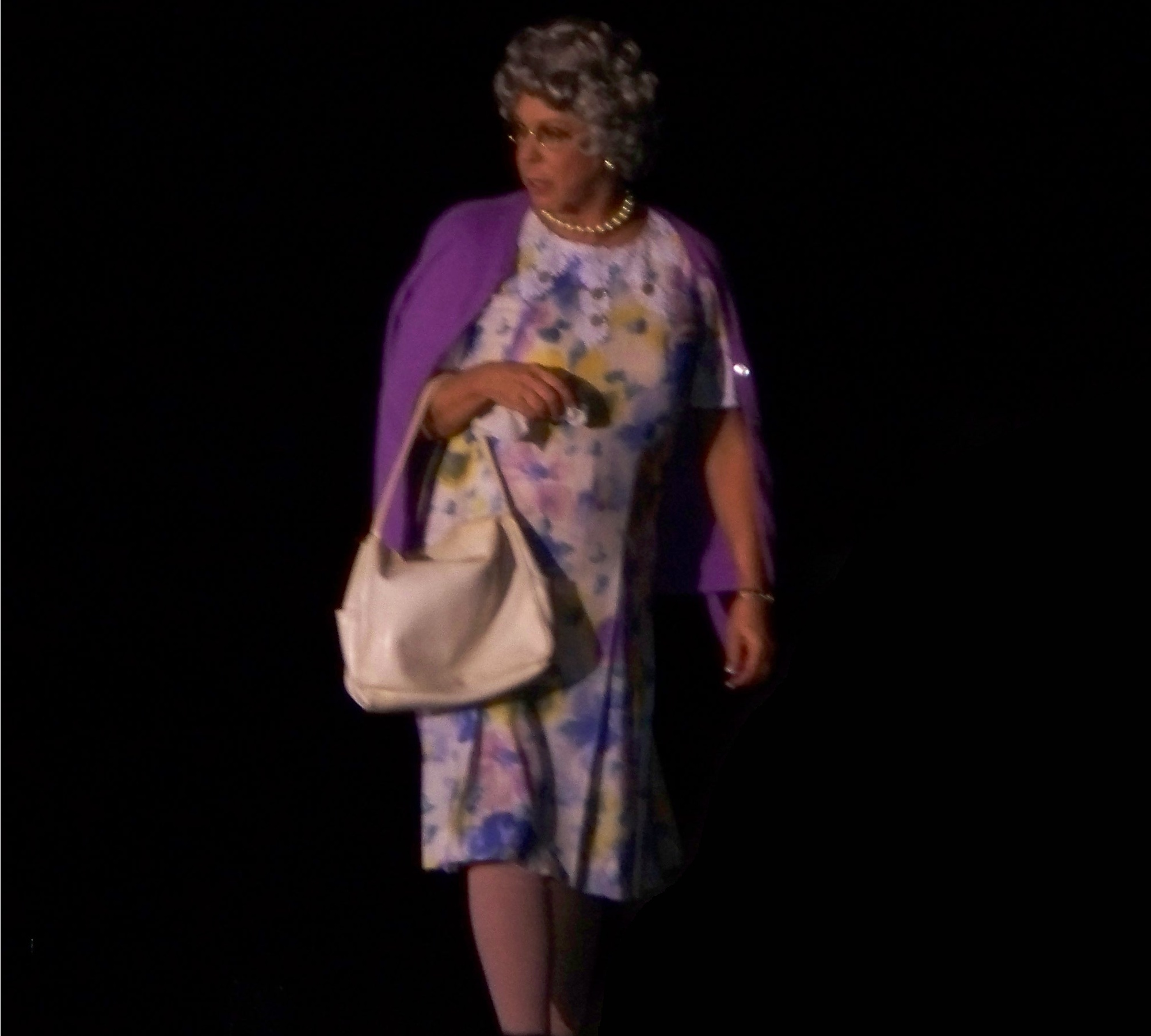
Vicki Lawrence as Thelma Harper, 2009

- Vicki Lawrence has been reprising her role of Mama in her untelevised touring stage show, entitled Vicki Lawrence and Mama: A Two-Woman Show. In the show, Lawrence first performs stand-up comedy as herself, then comes out in character as Mama, giving her opinions on modern-day topics. During the break between the two acts, the audience is shown bloopers from the syndicated seasons of the series. Lawrence also sings the lyrics she wrote for "Bless My Happy Home," the show's theme song, which were omitted from the version used on air.
- Lawrence has also appeared in her Mama role on several Halloween-themed episodes of the 1998–2004 run of Hollywood Squares with Tom Bergeron at the helm.
- Lawrence appeared on RuPaul's Drag Race in the "All-Stars" season as Mama in the skit "RuPaul's Gaff-In".
- Lawrence appeared on The Queen Latifah Show as Mama the Monday after Mother's Day 2014 in a comic skit that aired prior to each commercial break. Lawrence also appeared on the show eight days later alongside two other well-known actresses to speak about her role of Mama and her personal life.
- Lawrence appeared as the character in promos for reruns of Mama's Family on the MeTV channel in 2015–2016.
- Lawrence appeared as the character in 2015 and 2016 on The Doctors, where she talked about health-related issues.

== Bibliography ==
- Mama for President: Good Lord, Why Not?, by Thelma Harper, as told to Vicki Lawrence and Monty Aidem, Thomas Nelson, 2008. ISBN 978-1-4016-0409-7
- "Mama's Family": The Unofficial Episode Viewing Guide, by Andrew Whitenack, ANDDAR Publications, 2011. ISBN 1-4662-9210-5
