= Blind Blake =

American blues singer and guitarist (1896–1934)

- The only known photograph of Blake, ca. 1927

Background information
- Also known as: Blind Blake
- Born: Arthur Blake; 1896; Jacksonville, Florida, or Newport News, Virginia, U.S.
- Died: December 1, 1934 (aged 37–38) Milwaukee, Wisconsin, U.S.
- Genres: Piedmont blues; ragtime; country blues
- Occupation: Musician
- Instruments: Guitar; vocals
- Label: Paramount
- Formerly of: Irene Scruggs

Arthur Blake (1896 – December 1, 1934), known as Blind Blake, was an American blues and ragtime singer and guitarist. He is known for recordings he made for Paramount Records between 1926 and 1932.

== Early life ==
Little is known of Blake's life. Promotional materials from Paramount Records indicate he was born blind and gave his birthplace as Jacksonville, Florida, and it seems that he lived there during various periods. He may have had relatives in Patterson, Georgia. Some authors have written that in one recording he slipped into a Geechee (Gullah) dialect, suggesting a connection with the Sea Islands. Blind Willie McTell indicated that Blake's real name was Arthur Phelps, but later research has shown this is unlikely to be correct. In 2011, a group of researchers led by Alex van der Tuuk published various documents regarding Blake's life and death in the journal Blues & Rhythm. One of these documents is his 1934 death certificate, which states he was born in 1896 in Newport News, Virginia, to Winter and Alice Blake (his mother's name is followed by a question mark). Nothing else is known of Blake until the 1920s, when he emerged as a recording musician.

== Career ==
Blake recorded about 80 tracks for Paramount Records from 1926 to 1932. He was one of the most accomplished guitarists of his genre and played a diverse range of material. He is best known for his distinctive guitar playing, which was comparable in sound and style to ragtime piano. He may have lived in Jacksonville, going to Chicago for his recording sessions. According to van der Tuuk et al., he returned to Florida for the winter. In the 1930s he was reported to be playing in front of a Jacksonville hotel.

== Music ==
Blake's first recordings were made in 1926, and his records sold well. His first solo record was "Early Morning Blues", with "West Coast Blues" on the B-side. Both are considered excellent examples of his ragtime-based guitar style and were prototypes for the burgeoning Piedmont blues. Blake made his last recordings in 1932; his career ended with Paramount's bankruptcy. Stefan Grossman and Gayle Dean Wardlow have suggested it is possible that only one side of Blake's last record is actually by him; "'Champagne Charlie Is My Name' does not sound like Blake's playing or singing".

His complex and intricate fingerpicking inspired Reverend Gary Davis, Jorma Kaukonen, Ry Cooder, Arlen Roth, John Fahey, Ralph McTell, David Bromberg, Leon Redbone, Muireann Bradley and many others. Big Bill Broonzy, hearing Blake in person in the early 1920s, said of his guitar playing "He made it sound like every instrument in the band- saxophone, trombone, clarinets, bass fiddles, pianos- everything. I never had seed then and I haven't to this day yet seed no one that could take his natural fingers and pick as much guitar as Blind Blake."

The track "You Gonna Quit Me" from Bob Dylan's 1992 album Good as I Been to You is a cover of Blind Blake's "You Gonna Quit Me Blues." The song "Diddy Wa Diddie" has been covered by Leon Redbone for his 1977 album Double Time and by Ry Cooder for his 1974 album Paradise and Lunch.

== Personal life ==
Blake married Beatrice McGee around 1931. In the following year, he made his final recording at the Paramount headquarters in Grafton, Wisconsin, just before the label went out of business.

== Death ==
For decades nothing was known of him after this point, and it was rumored that he met with a violent death. Reverend Gary Davis heard he had been hit by a streetcar in 1934 and The research of van der Tuuk et al. suggests that Blake stayed in Wisconsin, living in Milwaukee's Brewer's Hill neighborhood, where Paramount boarded many of its artists. He seems not to have found work as a musician. In April 1933, he was hospitalized with pneumonia and never fully recovered. On December 1, 1934, after three weeks of decline, Beatrice Blake summoned an ambulance. He had a pulmonary hemorrhage and died on the way to the hospital. The cause of death was listed as pulmonary tuberculosis. He was buried in Glen Oaks Cemetery, in Glendale, Wisconsin in a previously unmarked grave.

== Compilations ==
- The Legendary Blind Blake (Ristic, 1958)
- Blues in Chicago (Riverside, 1964)
- Guitar and Vocal (Jazz Collector, 1968)
- Bootleg Rum Dum Blues 1926–1930 (Biograph, 1968)
- Search Warrant Blues 1926–32 (Biograph, 1970)
- No Dough Blues 1926–29 (Biograph, 1971)
- That Lovin' I Crave (Biograph, 1974)
- Ragtime Guitar's Foremost Fingerpicker (DLP, 1984)
- Blind Blake 1926–29 (Matchbox, 1986)
- The Accompanist (1926–1931) (Wolf, 1989)
- Complete Recorded Works, vols. 1–4 (Document, 1991)
- The Master of Ragtime Guitar, The Essential Recordings (Indigo, 1996)
- Georgie Bound (Catfish, 1999)
- The Best of Blind Blake (Yazoo, 2000)
- The Essential Blind Blake (Document, 2002)
- All the Published Sides (JSP, 2003)
- Blind Blake (Black Swan, 2004)
- The Best of Blind Blake (Collectables, 2006)
- Southern Rag (Snapper, 2008)
- The Complete Recordings (P-Vine, 2008)
- The Best of Blind Blake (P-Vine, 2008)
- No Dough Blues (Pristine, 2009)
- Back Biting Bee Blues (Monk, 2009)
- True Revolution (KRG, 2011)
- The Rough Guide to Blues Legends: Blind Blake (World Music Network, 2013)

== In literature ==
Blake figures in the plot of Lee Child's first Jack Reacher novel, Killing Floor (1997), and there are references to him in Child's 2011 prequel, The Affair. Reference to Blake is made again in The Sentinel (2020), written by Lee Child and his brother Andrew Child, when Jack Reacher is on the lookout for venues in Nashville, 'where Blind Blake could have played'.

Blake's original recording of "Diddy Wa Diddie" is referenced on the cover of Robert Crumb's Zap Comix #1.

== In television ==
"Blind Blake" and his song "Police Dog Blues" appear in Reacher, Season 1, the TV series based on Lee Child's novel, Killing Floor. The main character Jack Reacher (a blues lover) arrives at the fictional town of Margrave, Georgia looking for some trace of Blake.
