= The Secret (Child novel) =

2023 novel by Lee and Andrew Child

- Hardcover edition
- Author: Lee Child and Andrew Child
- Language: English
- Series: Jack Reacher
- Release number: 28
- Genre: Thriller
- Publisher: Bantam Press (United Kingdom); Delacorte Press (United States)
- Publication date: October 24, 2023
- Publication place: United Kingdom
- Media type: Print (hardcover and paperback)
- Pages: 323
- ISBN: 978-1-78763-377-3
- OCLC: 1392070653
- Dewey Decimal: 813/.54
- LC Class: PS3553.H4838 .S43 2023
- Preceded by: No Plan B
- Followed by: In Too Deep

The Secret is the twenty-eighth novel in the Jack Reacher series written by Lee Child and Andrew Child. It is the fourth Jack Reacher novel co-authored by Lee Child, whose real name is James Dover Grant, and his younger brother Andrew Grant, published under their respective pen names of Lee Child and Andrew Child.

The book was released on United States, Canada, United Kingdom, New Zealand, Australia and Ireland by Bantam Press and Delacorte Press on October 24, 2023. It is written in the third person.

== Plot ==
In Chicago, 62-year-old Keith Bridgeman awakens after a heart attack. The two women posing as nurses show photographs of his family under surveillance. They demand information he plans to give a journalist and an eighth name from a 1969 India project. Bridgeman names Owen Buck, unaware Buck has died. The women identify themselves as Roberta and Veronica Sanson, daughters of Morgan Sanson. They push Bridgeman from a twelfth-floor window and stage his death as suicide.

Military Police captain Jack Reacher catches Sergeant Lisa Hall stealing rifle components, then joins a task force examining scientists' deaths. Defense Secretary Charles Stamoran tracks deaths of Bridgeman, Buck, and Varinder Singh. All served as covert Army and CIA operatives at Mason Chemical Industries in India in 1969. Stamoran orders protection for survivors Geoff Brown, Michael Rymer, and Charlie Adam. Their coordinator, Neville Pritchard, escapes agents sent to collect him. Stamoran tells his wife, Susan Kasluga, head of AmeriChem, that he was the eighth member.

The Sanson sisters hunt the survivors. They poison Brown's pipe tobacco, drown Rymer, and push Adam from a cliff. They demand the missing name, but none gives it. Reacher joins Christopher Baglin, FBI agent Amber Smith, CIA officer Kent Neilsen, and Treasury agent Gary Walsh. Baglin says Project 192 sought antidotes to Soviet biological weapons, the four members have died. Smith suspects Soviet intelligence; Reacher believes revenge motivates the killings. They visit former KGB defector Maksim Sarbotskiy, who says Project 192 concealed Typhon, a program developing offensive biological weapons. He directs them to journalist Spencer Flemming.

Flemming has hidden for twenty-two years in an abandoned hospital annex. He says Morgan Sanson accidentally shut down a cooling system, causing a gas leak that killed 1,007 civilians, not seven as reported. The photographs show victims with purple skin marks. A young Kasluga appeared as company spokesperson.

Neilsen learns Stamoran supervised Typhon, then dies in his hotel bathroom. Reacher, Smith, and Walsh trace calls to Stamoran's home. The sisters find Pritchard dead from carbon monoxide poisoning.

Reacher lures Neilsen's killer to an abandoned church and obtains a confession before the man dies. The sisters abduct Kasluga, who names Stamoran as the eighth member. At a Potomac pumping station, gunfire kills Stamoran and Roberta; Reacher shoots Veronica when she threatens Kasluga.

Walsh finds AmeriChem's first major product came from Typhon's nerve-agent formula. Reacher proves Kasluga wrote Stamoran's name on Roberta's list to frame him. He accuses her of stealing the formula and funds, causing the leak, and ordering Neilsen's and Pritchard's murders. Kasluga takes Smith hostage at Flemming's hideout, but Reacher wounds her and frees Smith. He receives a new assignment at an Illinois ammunition plant.

== Reception ==
The Secret received a generally favourable review from Kirkus Reviews, which described it as an "enjoyable, fast-moving yarn". The review praised the novel's entertainment value and several plot twists, while observing that its storyline became complicated and that Reacher's fighting abilities were not entirely believable.
