= Better Off Dead (novel) =

2021 novel by Lee and Andrew Child

- Hardcover edition
- Author: Lee Child and Andrew Child
- Language: English
- Series: Jack Reacher
- Release number: 26
- Genre: Thriller
- Publisher: Bantam Press (United Kingdom); Delacorte Press (United States)
- Publication date: October 26, 2021
- Publication place: United Kingdom
- Media type: Print (hardcover and paperback)
- Pages: 352
- ISBN: 978-1-78763-373-5
- OCLC: 1230460580
- Dewey Decimal: 813/.54
- LC Class: PS3553.H4838 .B48
- Preceded by: The Sentinel
- Followed by: No Plan B

Better Off Dead is the twenty-sixth novel in the Jack Reacher series written by Lee Child and Andrew Child. It is the second Jack Reacher novel co-authored by Lee Child, whose real name is James Grant, and his younger brother Andrew Grant, published under their respective pen names of Lee Child and Andrew Child.

The book was released on United States, Canada, United Kingdom, New Zealand, Australia and Ireland by Bantam Press and Delacorte Press on October 26, 2021. It is written in the first person.

== Plot ==
Near Arizona's border with Mexico, Jack Reacher finds a Jeep crashed against a tree. Driver Michaela Fenton asks where Michael is a two armed men arrive; she shoots them, but one names Waad Dendoncker as Michael's killer. Fenton turns her gun on herself, Reacher stops her.

Fenton lost her right foot in Afghanistan. Dendoncker, a former Army translator, owns Pie Sky, Inc., a catering company concealing smuggling. Fenton served at the FBI's Terrorist Explosive Device Analytical Center (TEDAC). Her last case concerned an unexploded bomb bearing Michael's fingerprint. She destroyed the evidence, believing he left it as a plea for help, Reacher agrees.

Dr. Houllier, made to prepare unrecorded bodies, joins them. Reacher and Fenton fake his death with a blank, fake blood, and sedatives. Houllier takes him to the morgue. Dendoncker arrives; Reacher attacks the guards. Fenton takes Dendoncker at gunpoint, but his men recapture her by tracking her GPS watch.

Reacher alerts FBI Agent Jefferson Wallwork to the bomb threat and Fenton's capture. At the Red Roan café, Michael's girlfriend Sonia says he designed smoke devices for Operation Clarion, a Veterans Day protest over chemical exposure. Reacher survives DS gas, wrecks Dendoncker's vehicles, and follows Mansour to a border house. A drain beneath the fence leads to Dendoncker's base in an abandoned Mexican school.

Dendoncker holds Fenton prisoner and offers freedom if Reacher drives a U-Haul with a smoke device to a destination. Reacher delivers it to Wallwork's team at a Texas motel, then returns by helicopter. He releases DS gas through a vent. Dendoncker escapes, but Fenton kills her guard. They find Michael in a basement cell, injured and attached to an IV. Reacher carries him to Houllier.

Wallwork reports that TEDAC found Nader Khalil's fingerprint on the device's transponder. Khalil is brother to the driver of the 1983 Marine barracks truck bomb, which wounded Reacher. Reacher reads Michael's clues: a Trojan condom and café card point to a Trojan horse. The dud was meant to carry its transponder into TEDAC and activate a truck bomb. Reacher drives it away.

Reacher returns to Dendoncker's base. Dendoncker arrives with Mansour; Reacher kills the enforcer and learns Dendoncker bought Khalil's fingerprint and planted it to frame him. Dendoncker had persuaded Khalil's brother to drive the 1983 bomb and wanted TEDAC evidence destroyed. He denies putting VX into the smoke devices. Reacher lets him leave, then calls a number Fenton found in her SUV. The call activates a third VX device, killing Dendoncker.

Hours later, Fenton finds Reacher leaving town. Michael is awake, and Sonia has returned. Fenton invites Reacher to stay, but he declines and heads west toward the Pacific Ocean.

== Reception ==
Better Off Dead received generally positive reviews, with particular praise for its action sequences, dramatic twists, and entertaining approach to the thriller genre. Publishers Weekly gave the novel a starred review, praising the Child brothers' collaboration, smart writing, vivid action scenes, and dramatic twists. Kirkus Reviews offered a more mixed assessment, describing it as an entertaining read for thriller readers while criticizing its writing style and the plausibility of its plot.
