= Killing Floor (novel) =

1997 debut novel by Lee Child

- First UK edition
- Author: Lee Child
- Language: English
- Series: Jack Reacher
- Release number: 1
- Genre: Thriller
- Publisher: Bantam Press (United Kingdom); Putnam (United States)
- Publication date: 6 March 1997
- Publication place: United Kingdom
- Media type: Print (hardcover and paperback)
- Pages: 364
- ISBN: 0-593-04143-7
- OCLC: 35249487
- Dewey Decimal: 813/.54
- LC Class: PS3553.H4838 K55 1997
- Followed by: Die Trying

Killing Floor is the debut novel by Lee Child, first published in 1997 by Putnam. The book won the Anthony Award and Barry Award for best first novel. Set in 1997 in the fictional town of Margrave, Georgia, it follows Jack Reacher in his first thriller book. It is written in the first person.

The novel has four prequels: The Enemy (set seven years before Killing Floor, published in 2004), The Secret, (set five years before Killing Floor, published in 2023), Night School (set one year before Killing Floor, published in 2016), and The Affair (set six months before Killing Floor, published in 2011).

== Plot ==
Jack Reacher, a former major in the United States Army's military police, gets off a Greyhound bus in the Georgia town of Margrave, because he remembers his brother mentioning that a blues musician named Blind Blake had died there. Much to his surprise, shortly after his arrival, Reacher is arrested in a local diner for murder on the orders of the sheriff, Morrison, who falsely claims he saw Reacher leave the scene of the crime.

While in custody, Reacher meets Finlay, the local chief of detectives, and Roscoe, a female officer who believes him to be innocent. Reacher persuades Finlay to call a number on a piece of paper found in the victim's shoe; the number leads them to Paul Hubble, a retired banker, who immediately confesses to the murder. Before Reacher can be released, he and Hubble are transferred to a state prison in Warburton, where Reacher manages to thwart an attempt on their lives by the Aryan Brotherhood. Suspecting that the assistant warden set them up, Reacher joins Finlay's investigation, while Hubble is presumed dead after vanishing from his house in the middle of the day.

Reacher learns that the murdered man is his brother Joe, who was an investigator with the Treasury Department and was running an investigation into a counterfeiting ring operated by the Kliner family under the protection of Morrison, several corrupt cops and Mayor Grover Teale. The body of truck driver Sherman Stoller is found, and Morrison and his wife are brutally murdered shortly thereafter. Roscoe theorizes that the Kliners use Margrave as a distribution hub for counterfeit money, but this is disproven when Reacher finds one of their trucks empty. He then realizes the Kliners have been hoarding the money in response to a Coast Guard operation cutting off their supply of bills from Venezuela, and plan to resume distribution once the operation is shut down as a cost-saving measure.

Sending Hubble's family into hiding to protect them from the Kliners, Reacher kills Kliner's son and three associates after luring them into an ambush. He then informs Finlay of the secret behind the Kliners' operation, which his brother had been trying to prove—to obtain the special paper required to make undetectable forgeries, the criminals had employed Hubble to collect hundreds of thousands of used $1 bills and send them to ports in Florida through Stoller and other drivers, whereupon they would be bleached in Venezuela to remove the ink and then used to make forged $100 bills. However, when Reacher and Finlay return to Margrave, they are taken captive by Kliner, Teale and Finlay's FBI contact Picard, who reveals that he has been keeping track of their progress and has Roscoe and Hubble's family in his custody. Kliner reveals that Hubble is not dead, but in hiding, and threatens to kill his hostages unless Reacher finds him.

En route, Reacher stages a distraction and kills his escorts before shooting Picard. He then locates Hubble in a nearby motel and returns him to Margrave. Finding the criminals gone, they spring Finlay from captivity in the police station and set it on fire before locating the hostages at Kliner's warehouse. Reacher shoots Teale and Kliner and sets fire to the rest of their money. A wounded Picard arrives and initially bests Reacher in a fight, injuring him to get the upper hand, but with Finlay's help, Reacher kills Picard. The group escapes as the warehouse explodes, and Reacher spends the night with Roscoe. Realizing that his actions will attract much unwanted attention from authorities, Reacher decides to leave Georgia. Roscoe gives him one last gift: a picture of his brother retrieved from one of Kliner's victims.

== Adaptation ==
The book was developed into the first season of TV series Reacher, produced by Skydance Television, Paramount Television Studios, Blackjack Films, and Amazon Studios for Amazon Prime Video. It premiered on February 4, 2022. Various changes were made, such as "The Kliner Kid" being split up into two different characters, KJ and Dawson Kliner. Moreover, Frances Neagley appears in the season, ahead of her original first appearance. Lee Child makes a cameo appearance at the conclusion of the series. As Reacher enters a diner, Child walks past him and says, "Oh, excuse me. Sorry." The two exchange looks.

== Awards and nominations ==
- 1998 Anthony Award winner, Best First Novel
- 1998 Barry Award winner, Best First Novel
- 1998 Dilys Award nominee
- 1998 Macavity Award nominee, Best First Mystery Novel
- 2000 Japan Adventure Fiction Association Prize winner, Best Translated Novel
