= Exit Strategy (Child novel) =

2025 novel by Lee and Andrew Child

- Hardcover edition
- Author: Lee Child and Andrew Child
- Language: English
- Series: Jack Reacher
- Release number: 30
- Genre: Thriller
- Publisher: Bantam Press (United Kingdom); Delacorte Press (United States)
- Publication date: November 4, 2025
- Publication place: United Kingdom
- Media type: Print (hardcover and paperback)
- Pages: 339
- ISBN: 978-0-85750-561-3
- OCLC: 1547598808
- Dewey Decimal: 813/.54
- Preceded by: In Too Deep
- Followed by: Chain Reaction

Exit Strategy is the thirtieth novel in the Jack Reacher series written by Lee Child and Andrew Child. It is the sixth Jack Reacher novel co-authored by Lee Child, whose real name is James Dover Grant, and his younger brother Andrew Grant, published under their respective pen names of Lee Child and Andrew Child.

The book was released in the United Kingdom, New Zealand, Australia and Ireland by Bantam Press on November 4, 2025, and in the United States and Canada by Delacorte Press on November 11, 2025. It is written in the third person.

== Plot ==
Nathan Gilmour is employed by Baltimore's Port Administration after military service in military intelligence. When a coworker dies beneath a falling shipping container, Gilmour suspects he was the intended victim. He has passed shipping schedules to criminals since Zack Weaver helped settle his gambling debts. Weaver uses the debt to control him, and Gilmour fears for himself and his nephew. He turns to Harvey Jones for help, but Jones dies before their planned meeting.

Jack Reacher arrives in Baltimore for a blues concert. At a coffee shop, he notices swindlers persuading a couple to surrender their savings. Reacher intervenes, recovers the money and returns it to them. Outside, Gilmour mistakes him for Jones and slips a note into his pocket. After finding it, Reacher follows the instructions to an abandoned warehouse, where Gilmour recounts his predicament. Reacher has little sympathy for a man who supplied shipping data, but the threat to Gilmour's nephew persuades him to help.

Gilmour and Reacher visit Sabrina Patten, a port human-resources employee who arranged Gilmour's hiring and is also being blackmailed. In a both received treatment from Dr. Alyssa Martin, who passed their patient records to Weaver. When Reacher's group arrives at Martin's home, they find her dead. Kathryn Kasselwood, a former CIA officer, killed Martin while attempting to retrieve her own file. Kasselwood then kills Weaver, takes his phone and sends false messages concerning a shipment from India.

Reacher, Gilmour and Patten trace the cargo to Seagirt Marine Terminal. Kasselwood is moving a crate there when Strickland Security Solutions takes custody of it. Meeting at the inside is Violeta Vardanyan, an Armenian woman whose testimony could expose a fabricated threat between Iran and Armenia.

Morgan Strickland, head of the private military contractor, intends to use Vardanyan to persuade government leaders that Iran poses a nuclear threat. He expects the claim to secure a lucrative Pentagon contract. In a corrupt Pentagon employee Mark Hewson helps him access military staff. Strickland recruits men unfit for soldiering, arranges for their deaths to be recorded as battlefield losses, then stores their bodies in refrigerated storage so his company can claim payments.

Reacher enlists crime boss Dominic Kelleher to draw guards away from the contractor's facility. During the diversion, Reacher, Gilmour and Kasselwood enter the facility and find the dead men. Reacher confronts Strickland, who incapacitates Gilmour and attempts to escape, Reacher catches and kills him.

The next morning, Reacher and Gilmour intercept Hewson and his guards. Reacher kills them, allowing Vardanyan to testify. He gives Gilmour half a million dollars. Gilmour decides to establish a service that helps veterans escape gambling debts and other money traps. Reacher departs Baltimore by bus after the concert, having stopped a fabricated military venture from becoming a profitable enterprise.

== Release ==
Exit Strategy is scheduled to be released and publishing date by Bantam Press in the United Kingdom, New Zealand, Australia and Ireland on November 4, 2025 and the publishing by Delacorte Press in the United States and Canada on November 11, 2025.

== Reception ==
Exit Strategy received mixed reviews from critics. Kirkus Reviews described the novel as a competent adventure, praising its intricate plot while criticizing the characterization of Jack Reacher, whom the reviewer considered less memorable than in earlier installments. In contrast, Criminal Element praised the novel as one of the strongest installments since Andrew Child joined his brother in writing the series, highlighting its surprises and characterization. Bookreporter also gave the novel a positive assessment, praising its plot, supporting characters and concluding confrontation.
