= No Plan B (novel) =

2022 novel by Lee and Andrew Child

- Hardcover edition
- Author: Lee Child and Andrew Child
- Language: English
- Series: Jack Reacher
- Release number: 27
- Genre: Thriller
- Publisher: Bantam Press (United Kingdom); Delacorte Press (United States)
- Publication date: October 25, 2022
- Publication place: United Kingdom
- Media type: Print (hardcover and paperback)
- Pages: 352
- ISBN: 978-1-78763-375-9
- OCLC: 1291876882
- Dewey Decimal: 813/.54
- LC Class: PS3553.H4838
- Preceded by: Better Off Dead
- Followed by: The Secret

No Plan B is the twenty-seventh novel in the Jack Reacher series written by Lee Child and Andrew Child. It is the third Jack Reacher novel co-authored by Lee Child, whose real name is James Grant, and his younger brother Andrew Grant, published under their respective pen names of Lee Child and Andrew Child.

The book was released on United States, Canada, United Kingdom, New Zealand, Australia and Ireland by Bantam Press and Delacorte Press on October 25, 2022. It is written in the third person.

== Plot ==
At Minerva Correctional Facility in Winson, Mississippi, CEO Bruno Hix meets COO Damon Brockman, Warden Curtis Riverdale, and Police Chief Rod Moseley. They fear a stranger in Colorado has seen papers taken from Angela St. Vrain, whom they killed. The papers concern Anton Begovic, a prisoner due for release, Hix orders a watch.

Jack Reacher, a former military police officer, arrives in Gerrardsville, Colorado. He sees a man push a woman beneath a bus and steal her purse. Reacher catches him and finds Angela's license, Minerva staff badge, and an envelope for Danny Peel. It contains a photo of a young man missing an earlobe and papers on Begovic's wrongful sentence. A second attacker arrives; after gunfire, the men flee with the purse.

Fifteen-year-old Jed Starmer learns that his father was wrongly jailed in Mississippi and travels south. Reacher reports Angela's death to Detective Harewood. The two armed men from Winson enter his motel room, but Reacher overpowers them using a dummy. Hannah Hampton, ex-wife of Sam Roth, tells Reacher that Roth was gay and Angela had asked him about missing money at Minerva. Her emails on Roth's laptop were replaced with fabricated love notes. Reacher concludes Angela and Roth were murdered and heads for Winson.

Arsonist Lev Emerson follows a trail toward Mississippi. Hannah drives Reacher south. Minerva guards attack them, but Reacher defeats them. In Winson, they learn Danny Peel died in a house fire. Reacher and Hannah defeat six men sent to stop them.

At the release ceremony, Hix presents an impostor as Begovic. Reacher spots the fraud: the man has both earlobes, unlike the person pictured. At Hix's estate, Reacher meets Maurice, a young reporter examining Minerva's inmate death rate. Hix admits Carpenter arranged organ sales using prisoners held in segregation wing S1. Minerva used Begovic's release order to give Carpenter another identity. The real Begovic remains alive, awaiting organ removal.

Reacher enters Minerva using Hix's ID and car. He finds Begovic alive but unresponsive in S1. A blackout locks every door, so Reacher makes a device from copper wire, a defibrillator, and a battery to open the locks. He disarms two guards, kills Riverdale, and escapes with Begovic.

Emerson and Graeber seize Hannah and Jed at Hix's estate and prepare to burn Hix, Brockman, and Carpenter with napalm. Reacher returns and fires into the barrel, killing Graeber. Emerson ignites himself; Reacher shoots him, Hannah and Jed survive. Chief Moseley draws his gun on Hix, but Maurice records his admission. The FBI arrests those responsible, Hannah offers Jed and Begovic a home. Jed asks Reacher to stay, but Reacher leaves.

== Reception ==
No Plan B received generally positive reviews from critics. Publishers Weekly praised the novel's fast pacing and suspenseful plot, noting the Child brothers' effective collaboration. Kirkus Reviews described it as a "grimly efficient addition to the Reacher canon", praising its action while noting that the opening sections were unusually disjointed.
