= Tasha Alexander =

American author

- Born: Anastasia Gutting; December 1, 1969 (age 56); South Bend, Indiana, U.S.
- Spouse: Andrew Grant (m. 2010)
- Parent: Gary Gutting (father)
- Writing career
- Pen name: Tasha Alexander
- Language: English
- Period: 2005–present
- Website: tashaalexander.com

Tasha Alexander (born Anastasia Gutting on December 1, 1969) is an American author of historical mystery fiction.

== Biography ==
Alexander was born and raised in South Bend, Indiana, to Anastasia (Friel) and Gary Gutting, University of Notre Dame philosophy professors.

In 2002, while living in New Haven, Connecticut, she started work on her first novel after being inspired by a passage in Dorothy L. Sayers's Gaudy Night. Carolyn Marino at William Morrow acquired the book, And Only to Deceive, which was published in 2005 as the first installment of the Lady Emily series. After moving to Franklin, Tennessee, where Alexander wrote her second novel in a Starbucks coffeehouse, she moved to Chicago, where in 2010 she married British crime novelist Andrew Grant, brother of bestselling author Lee Child.

In 2007, according to Library Journal, Minotaur Books "lured her away" from William Morrow.

== The Lady Emily series ==
The Lady Emily series, set in a time between the 1890s and 1900s and spanning across cities throughout Europe, follows the adventures of Lady Emily and her husband Colin Hargreaves.

Novels and short stories

The Lady Emily series
No.	Year	Novel	ISBN (William Morrow)
01.	2005	And Only to Deceive	ISBN 978-0-060-75671-0
02.	2007	A Poisoned Season	ISBN 978-0-061-17414-8
03.	2008	A Fatal Waltz	ISBN 978-0-061-17422-3
03.05	2009	"The Bridal Strain" (short story)	ISBN — (none) —
No.	Year	Novel	ISBN (Minotaur Books)
04.	2009	Tears of Pearl	ISBN 978-0-312-38370-1
05.	2010	Dangerous to Know	ISBN 978-0-312-38379-4
06.	2011	A Crimson Warning	ISBN 978-0-312-66175-5
07.	2012	Death in the Floating City	ISBN 978-0-312-66176-2
08.	2013	Behind the Shattered Glass	ISBN 978-1-250-02470-1
09.	2014	The Counterfeit Heiress	ISBN 978-1-250-02469-5
09.05	2014	"Star of the East" (short story)	ISBN 978-1-466-87367-4
10.	2015	The Adventuress	ISBN 978-1-250-05826-3
10.05	2015	"That Silent Night" (short story)	ISBN 978-1-466-89277-4
11.	2016	A Terrible Beauty	ISBN 978-1-250-05827-0
12.	2017	Death in St. Petersburg	ISBN 978-1-250-05828-7
12.05	2018	"Amid the Winter's Snow" (short story)	ISBN 978-1-250-21300-6
13.	2018	Uneasy Lies the Crown	ISBN 978-1-250-16470-4
13.05	2019	"Upon the Midnight Clear" (short story)	ISBN 978-1-250-75125-6
14.	2020	In the Shadow of Vesuvius	ISBN 978-1-250-16473-5
15.	2021	The Dark Heart of Florence	ISBN 978-1-250-62206-8
16.	2022	Secrets of the Nile	ISBN 978-1-250-81969-7
17.	2023	A Cold Highland Wind	ISBN 978-1-250-87233-3

== Non-Lady Emily short story works ==
(Short stories appearing in anthology collections)

- "Preparations" – Kwik Krimes (2013; anthology edited by Otto Penzler) ISBN 978-1-612-18300-8
- "Before a Bohemian Scandal" – Echoes of Sherlock Holmes (2016; anthology edited by Laurie R. King and Leslie S. Klinger) ISBN 978-1-681-77225-7
- "[self-titled essay]" – Private Investigations (2020; anthology edited by Victoria Zackheim) ISBN 978-1-580-05921-3

== Miscellaneous works ==
- Elizabeth: The Golden Age, novelization, (2007); ISBN 978-0-061-43123-4
  based on motion picture screenplay written by William Nicholson and Michael Hirst;
  published to coincide with release of 2007 film Elizabeth: The Golden Age, starring Cate Blanchett and Clive Owen.
