= Persuader (novel) =

2003 novel by Lee Child

- First edition (UK)
- Author: Lee Child
- Language: English
- Series: Jack Reacher
- Release number: 7
- Genre: Thriller
- Publisher: Bantam Press (United Kingdom); Delacorte Press (United States)
- Publication date: April 7, 2003
- Publication place: United Kingdom
- Media type: Print (hardcover and paperback)
- Pages: 395
- ISBN: 0-593-04689-7
- OCLC: 50694787
- Dewey Decimal: 813/.54 21
- LC Class: PS3553.H4838 P4 2003
- Preceded by: Without Fail
- Followed by: The Enemy

Persuader is the seventh book in the Jack Reacher series written by Lee Child. It was published in 2003 by Delacorte Press in America and Bantam in the United Kingdom. It is written in the first person.

== Plot ==
At a New England college, two men ram a Lincoln Town Car carrying Richard Beck and drag him out. Jack Reacher, posing as a delivery driver, shoots both kidnappers. A plainclothes officer approaches; Reacher mistakes his movement for an attack and shoots him. He takes Richard to his father's estate in Abbot, Maine. They arrive at an isolated coastal estate protected by granite walls, razor wire, a massive gate, and armed guards. Richard's mother, Elizabeth Beck, welcomes Reacher, but a bodyguard name Duke takes Reacher's weapons and confines him upstairs. Reacher retrieves a messaging device and alerts his contacts.

The kidnapping was staged eleven days earlier. Reacher had spotted Quinn, a former Military Intelligence officer believed dead for ten years. DEA agents Susan Duffy and Steven Eliot suspect Richard's father, Zachary Beck, an Oriental rug importer, of drug trafficking. Duffy's undercover agent, Teresa Daniel, vanished seven weeks earlier. Duffy agrees to help Reacher find Quinn if he enters Beck's household to locate Teresa. Beck tests Reacher with Russian roulette; Reacher survives and earns a job. He crushes bodyguard Paulie's hand in an arm-wrestling match. During a delivery trip, Duffy's colleagues find only rugs.

A basement search reveals a cell with JUSTICE scratched into its floor. Reacher identifies Teresa Justice as the missing agent and finds Beck's Thompson submachine guns. Elizabeth says Paulie forces her to undress at his gatehouse and Beck answers to a superior. Reacher kills Duke after he refuses to disclose Teresa's location. Beck appoints Reacher head of security.

Quinn's computer specialist identifies a federal agent in Beck's household. Beck's men find an ATF-issued Glock and messaging device in a maid's vehicle, then kill her. Reacher helps dispose of her body. Her identification shows she belonged to ATF, not DEA: Beck is an illegal arms dealer, not a drug trafficker. Two bodyguards escape custody and kill two DEA agents; Reacher and agent Terry Villanueva ambush them. Reacher also kills Paulie in a fight outside the estate.

Reacher, Duffy, and Villanueva search Beck's warehouse and find Soviet weapons, including sniper rifles, rocket launchers, and SA-7 missiles capable of destroying aircraft. Libyan buyers are trading for two hundred Mossberg Persuader shotguns. A catering order and a $10,000 invoice entry convince Reacher that Teresa is to be sold at a banquet.

Flashbacks explain Reacher's hatred of Quinn. Quinn stole classified tank blueprints and sold them abroad. When Sergeant First Class Dominique Kohl and her partner tried to arrest him, Quinn murdered both women. Reacher shot Quinn in California, but he survived and took control of Beck's organization after abducting Richard five years earlier.

Reacher frees drugged Teresa and returns to Beck's estate with two loaded shotguns. Quinn grabs Beck as a shield, while Richard refuses to let Reacher shoot his father. Reacher escapes through a window, retrieves a sharpened chisel hidden behind a courtyard wall, enters through the kitchen, knocks Beck unconscious, and kills Quinn with the chisel. He says, "Ten-eighteen, Dom," a military police code meaning assignment completed.

Reacher visits Duffy's motel and tells her to transfer the arms case to ATF. After spending the night together, he wakes to find Duffy gone. She has left two sets of clothes. Reacher takes the warmer set, leaves Beck's Cadillac at an Interstate 95 rest area, and heads south.

== Adaptation ==
The book was developed into the third season of TV series Reacher produced by Skydance Television, Paramount Television Studios, Blackjack Films, and Amazon Studios for Amazon Prime Video. It premiered on February 20, 2025.

== Critical reception ==
Leslie Doran of The Denver Post said that the novel had a "gripping and suspenseful opening" and that "for returning Reacher fans...beginning scenes will cause extra suspense". Patrick Anderson of The Washington Post described it as "a skillful blend of sex, violence, sadism, weaponry, spies, smuggling, revenge, deception, suspense and nonstop action", though he also notes that the novel has "several premises that are hard to swallow". After a short description of how quickly he read through the earlier books in the series after reading Persuader, Dale Jones of The Gazette simply stated "You might say I liked it".

The Crime Writers' Association nominated the book for the 2003 Steel Dagger Award for best thriller novel first published in the UK.
