= Without Fail =

2002 novel by Lee Child

- First edition (UK)
- Author: Lee Child
- Language: English
- Series: Jack Reacher
- Release number: 6
- Genre: Thriller
- Publisher: Bantam Press (United Kingdom); Putnam (United States)
- Publication date: 9 May 2002
- Publication place: United Kingdom
- Media type: Print (hardcover and paperback)
- Pages: 398
- ISBN: 0-593-04686-2
- OCLC: 48256711
- Dewey Decimal: 813/.54 21
- LC Class: PS3553.H4838 W58 2002
- Preceded by: Echo Burning
- Followed by: Persuader

Without Fail is the sixth book in the Jack Reacher series written by Lee Child. It was published in 2002 by Putnam in America and Bantam in the United Kingdom.In the novel, retired military police officer Jack Reacher is asked by the Secret Service to help track down assassins who are threatening the Vice President-Elect.

The novel, is dedicated "For the real Frances L. Neagley", who is a real person. Frances Neagley won a Bouchercon charity auction to have a character named after her in Child's novels

== Plot ==
Shortly after arriving in Atlantic City, Jack Reacher is approached by Secret Service Agent M.E. Froelich, who had dated Reacher's late brother Joe, and is asked to conduct a "security audit" of the Secret Service's protection of Vice President-elect Brook Armstrong. While accompanying Armstrong in a series of public appearances, Reacher reveals to Froelich that he hired his old colleague from the military police, Chicago security consultant Frances Neagley, to help with the "audit." Working together, they find multiple vulnerabilities in Armstrong's detail.

Froelich reveals that the Secret Service has been receiving written death threats against Armstrong, who is oblivious to their existence. She and her supervisor, a man named Stuyvesant, agree to hire Reacher and Neagley to help their investigation. Reacher and Froelich sleep together, though he questions whether she genuinely likes him or is vicariously reliving her relationship with Joe.

As a warning message, the would-be assassins kill two men, one in Colorado and one in Minnesota, who resemble the Vice President and also have the name "B. Armstrong". An assassin team appears at another event in Bismarck, but Reacher confronts them and forces them to flee. Armstrong is scheduled to visit a Washington, D.C. homeless shelter on Thanksgiving Day, leading Reacher and Neagley to argue that Armstrong be warned and the event cancelled. Stuyvesant agrees to bring in the FBI for help; they send Special Agent Bannon, who concludes that a Secret Service agent is behind the killings.

Despite Froelich meticulously securing the venue, an assassin kills a Secret Service sniper, takes over his position and fires at Armstrong twice. The assassin misses with the first shot, and Froelich shields the vice president from the second. Fatally struck in the neck, she dies in Reacher's arms after addressing him as "Joe".

Armstrong agrees to Reacher's advice to publicly announce he will attend Froelich's funeral in Wyoming in an effort to lure the assassins out into the open. The vice president insists that his detail be limited to three men, out of respect for Froelich's family. Reacher remembers seeing the Thanksgiving shooter running with a badge during the assassination attempt in Bismarck, concluding that the assassins are policemen. Reacher also deduces that they are motivated by some personal vendetta against Armstrong. The vice president admits that, as a teenager, he stood by as his father brutally beat two local bullies with a baseball bat.

In Wyoming, Reacher and Neagley see the assassins arrive and ambush them the morning of the funeral. Neagley and Reacher kill the assassins, who are revealed to be cops from rural Idaho. Before catching a plane to Chicago, Neagley, who ordinarily dislikes being touched, gives Reacher a quick hug.

== Awards and nominations ==
- 2003 Dilys Award nomination.
- 2003 Barry Award nomination, Best Novel.

== See also ==
- Assassinations in fiction
