= Gone Tomorrow =

2009 novel by Lee Child

- First edition (UK)
- Author: Lee Child
- Language: English
- Series: Jack Reacher
- Release number: 13
- Genre: Thriller
- Publisher: Bantam Press (United Kingdom); Delacorte Press (United States)
- Publication date: April 23, 2009
- Publication place: United Kingdom
- Media type: Print (hardcover and paperback)
- Pages: 396
- ISBN: 978-0-593-05705-6
- OCLC: 245599035
- Dewey Decimal: 813/.54
- LC Class: PS3553.H4838 G66 2009
- Preceded by: Nothing To Lose
- Followed by: 61 Hours

Gone Tomorrow is the thirteenth novel in the Jack Reacher series written by Lee Child. It was published in the United Kingdom by Bantam Press on April 23, 2009 and in the United States by Delacorte Press on May 19, 2009. It is written in the first person.

== Plot ==
Jack Reacher is travelling on the New York City Subway at 2:00am when he notices a suspicious-looking passenger who matches many of the characteristics of a potential suicide bomber. He approaches the woman, identifies himself as a cop, and makes an offer of assistance; she takes a gun from her bag and kills herself. The New York City Police Department (NYPD) is eager to close the file without investigating the tragedy, but Reacher wants to know what happened that night and, more importantly, why the woman, Pentagon staffer Susan Mark, left Washington, D.C. and killed herself in New York. He is repeatedly and emphatically warned off the case, but his guilt over possibly triggering the woman's suicide drives him on. With the help of Detective Theresa Lee and Susan's brother Jacob, known as Jake, Reacher discovers several different players who seem to be involved in whatever drove Susan over the edge. Thugs sent to intimidate Reacher drop the name of John Sansom, a congressman. Unidentified federal agents also attempt to steer Reacher away from the case.

Reacher learns from Jake that Susan had a son, Peter Molina, who may be missing; Peter is a star football player for the University of Southern California who fell off the radar at the same time his mother killed herself. Reacher investigates Sansom, learning that the congressman received several medals for clandestine missions in the 1980s. After a trip to meet Sansom at a fundraising event in his district, Reacher identifies a tail waiting for him back in New York. Reacher is able to disable the man and take his phone, which leads Reacher to Lila Hoth and her mother Svetlana. Lila claims to be the widow of a Russian oligarch and that Susan was helping her and Svetlana investigate the circumstances around the deaths of both Lila's father and uncle during the Soviet-Afghan War. The Hoths hold Sansom responsible for their deaths, telling Reacher that U.S. special forces operating illegally in Afghanistan ambushed Lila's father and took his sniper rifle, then turned them over to the Mujahedeen fighters who tortured him to death while Svetlana was forced to listen to his screams just outside the Soviet base.

Reacher partially believes Lila but doubts she is Svetlana's daughter, suspecting she may be a journalist using Svetlana as a source for a story. While returning to the Hoths' hotel for a follow-up meeting, Reacher is abducted by three federal agents and three NYPD officers. After being shot with a tranquilizer gun, he was put in a cage. After a round of interrogation (and another tranquilizer dart), he is locked up along with Lee and Jake. Reacher is able to attack and incapacitate the agents when they take him out of the cage for more interrogation, then freed Lee and Jake.

Continuing his investigation, Reacher discovers that the Hoths are not who they had claimed; Svetlana was the Mujahedeen fighter who killed Grigori Hoth and Lila is her pupil, both now Al Qaeda terrorists. The pair have already murdered people, including Peter. Lila sends Reacher a video of Peter's gruesome death and promises to torture him in the same way. Reacher vows to kill Lila and Svetlana.

Reacher determines that Susan was told her son would be killed if she did not provide the Hoths with information about Sansom's activities in Afghanistan. It turns out that Sansom had a photo taken of himself with Osama bin Laden as part of U.S. efforts to aid the Mujahedeen effort against the Soviets. That photo could now not only end Sansom's career, but also embarrass Al Qaeda as well, since the Hoths seem intent on making the photo disappear. Susan loaded the information on a memory card and deleted the original file from Pentagon computers. She was on her way to New York with the memory card, but she was stuck in traffic and missed her midnight deadline. The uncompromising Hoths sent her a video of her son's torture. In self-disgust and despair, Susan threw the card and her phone out of her car window, then decided to kill Lila to avenge Peter. However, Reacher stopped her before she could carry out her revenge.

Despite being chased by federal agents and Lila's group, Reacher finds the building where the Hoths are hiding, taking out what he thinks are all the remaining men guarding them. As he reaches Lila and Svetlana, he only has one bullet left in his gun. However, there is unexpectedly one more man left for him to shoot, using his last bullet. With his gun empty, the Hoths force Reacher to undress at gunpoint. Once he has stripped to his boxers, they tell Reacher they are going to cut him to pieces and put the gun away, each now holding a knife. While not an expert with a blade, Reacher has a knife taped to his lower back. Reacher uses his size, reach and the knife to kill Svetlana. He and Lila injure each other seriously before she is overpowered and strangled to death. Reacher is able to put duct tape over a wound before he passes out. He wakes up in the hospital with Lee, Jake and Sampson, and tells them where to find the memory card. Lee correctly predicts that the card will be reported as destroyed.

== Adaptation ==
The book was developed into the fourth season of TV series Reacher produced by Skydance Television, Paramount Television Studios, Blackjack Films, and Amazon Studios for Amazon Prime Video. It premiered on August 12, 2026.

== Critical reception ==
Gone Tomorrow has the switchback plotting and frictionless prose that are Child's trademarks. Unlike most of the series, though, it's narrated by Reacher himself. His lone-wolf habits and brusque, technophobic decodings of the world are always a pleasure, though how he maintains fighting fitness on a diet of pancakes, bacon and coffee is one of the world's great mysteries.

— John O'Connell, The Guardian

Gone Tomorrow has a surprisingly retro flavour, captured in Reacher's line "roll the clock back". The narrative works its way back through history in search of answers to the problems of the present. And there is something nostalgically neolithic about Reacher himself, a nomadic hunter-gatherer who can only be stopped by an anaesthetic dart-gun originally aimed at gorillas.

— Andy Martin, The Independent
