= A Wanted Man =

2012 novel by Lee Child

- Hardcover edition
- Author: Lee Child
- Language: English
- Series: Jack Reacher
- Release number: 17
- Genre: Thriller
- Publisher: Bantam Press (United Kingdom); Delacorte Press (United States)
- Publication date: August 30, 2012
- Publication place: United Kingdom
- Media type: Print (hardcover and paperback)
- Pages: 432
- ISBN: 978-0-593-06573-0
- OCLC: 772137972
- Dewey Decimal: 813/.54
- LC Class: PS3553.H4838 W36 2012
- Preceded by: The Affair
- Followed by: Never Go Back

A Wanted Man is the seventeenth book in the Jack Reacher series written by Lee Child. It was published on United Kingdom, New Zealand, Australia and Ireland by Bantam Press on August 30, 2012, and in the United States and Canada by Delacorte Press on September 11, 2012. A Wanted Man won the "Crime Book of the Year" award by the National Book Awards.

A Wanted Man returns to the present timeline, continuing where Worth Dying For left off, whereas the preceding novel, The Affair, told an episode of the main character's past. Like a majority of the Jack Reacher novels, it is told from the third-person point of view.

== Plot ==
Following from his last adventure Worth Dying For, Jack Reacher, is hitch-hiking out of Nebraska to Virginia. He is picked-up by Donald McQueen, Alan King and Karen Delfuenso. They ask him to take the wheel while McQueen and King sleep. FBI agent Julia Sorenson and Sheriff Victor Goodman believe that, after a murder, the men kidnapped cocktail waitress Delfuenso and stole her vehicle.

Their Chevrolet Impala passes two roadblocks where the highway police are searching for the killers. Karen repeatedly blinks, giving Reacher coded messages and he learns that the two men in the car are the wanted. Sorenson and Goodman's theory is proven correct after they visit a gas station and examine the security camera footage facing across the street.

After a stop for gas Reacher buys coffee for the group, but before doing so uses the store's phone to alert the cops. Sorenson, the closest to the area, drives over, but by then the group have left. McQueen becomes suspicious and tells Reacher to use his bank card which is a fraud to rent rooms for the night. In the motel lobby McQueen fires his gun at Reacher and misses. McQueen, King and Karen flee. Reacher is apprehended by Sorenson, whose boss wants Reacher arrested. But Sorenson gets a call that a vehicle is on fire nearby. Going to the location, they find a burning car with an unidentified body which they assume is Karen Delfuenso. Reacher manages to disarm Sorenson and tells her to drop him off a mile away from her office.

Sorenson is told by Goodman that Delfuenso's daughter, Lucy, has also been kidnapped. They also later learn that some terrorist threat against the United States might be involved in these events. Then they learn that the whole case has been closed as if it never happened, for some sort of over-riding national security reason. Reacher and Sorenson agree together to try to solve the case and catch the fugitives. Goodman later dies from a heart attack but leaves his phone and car behind for Reacher and Sorenson to use.

Karen has not been killed as expected but reveals herself as an undercover agent with the FBI and says that the body in the car was King. The other fugitive, McQueen, is also an undercover special agent with the FBI who tried to infiltrate a terrorist group called Wadia which has threatened to pollute a huge drinking water aquifer with nuclear waste. Reacher, Lucy, Sorenson, Karen and the eyewitness from the beginning of the novel have all ended locked up in some sort of witness-protection compound. Knowing that McQueen has gone off radar, Sorenson, Karen and Reacher escape the compound to try to save him. They are eventually able to locate the terrorists' hiding place, a huge ex-army missile storage bunker, but Sorenson is killed by a sniper. Despite Karen's protests, Reacher enters and kills the gang one by one, in retaliation for Sorenson.

He comes upon Peter King, Alan King's older brother, who wants revenge for his brother's death. McQueen might have been killed otherwise if he had not lied and said Reacher killed Alan. Reacher plays along and soon manages to kill Peter, but the thin cord binding McQueen takes time to saw through with a key and the remaining members of the group are all about to attack. Crucially assisted by Karen Delfuenso at a fatal juncture, Reacher, McQueen and Karen successfully escape. The terrorist threat turns out not to be as serious as was thought, because the group only claimed to possess damaging material. In reality, there only existed some empty trailers from the time of the cold war that had been forgotten in the bunker, but had never been used for nuclear material. The non-existent radioactive material was being used by Wadia as a sort of virtual currency they could use in trading with terrorist groups, making their whole establishment a terrorist network's "bank". Before setting out for Virginia, Reacher explains to McQueen the answer to a question Reacher had asked Alan King earlier in the book: "Can you talk non-stop for a minute without using the letter A?". The answer is you can do it by counting from one to one hundred. The first letter "A" occurring in "one hundred and one".

== Background ==
A Wanted Man is a sequel to Worth Dying For, despite its predecessor being The Affair which is a prequel novel. The following novel is Never Go Back and is a sequel, not prequel, to Worth Dying For and A Wanted Man in the series continuity, unlike The Affair.

Child is a fan of Aston Villa Football Club; the naming of the fictional characters, FBI agents Karen Delfuenso and Julia Sorenson are hidden reference to Aston Villa players Nathan Delfouneso and Thomas Sorenson.

== Reception ==
The book was a commercial success selling over a million copies worldwide and was No. 1 on many booksellers' lists for numerous weeks. It received mixed reviews. Many enjoyed the book, but thought its ending was too detailed and disagreed with its criticism of the United States' comprehensive security response to 9/11. The novel also criticized the CIA for being inept and lazy, while the FBI is given a far more favorable judgment.

Janet Maslin of The New York Times gave the book a positive review. She notes that the first half of the story confines Reacher in a vehicle, limiting his usual size advantage and the action, while the second part is elevated by quick action and solid detective work, leading to the inevitable climactic assaults. Maslin is critical of some of the dialogue, not being up to the usual standard. She calls Sorenson one of the best female characters in the whole Reacher series and also that the villains are more ingenious than previous books.
