= Blue Moon (Child novel) =

2019 novel by Lee Child

- Hardcover edition
- Author: Lee Child
- Language: English
- Series: Jack Reacher
- Release number: 24
- Genre: Thriller
- Publisher: Bantam Press (United Kingdom); Delacorte Press (United States)
- Publication date: October 29, 2019
- Publication place: United Kingdom
- Media type: Print (hardcover and paperback)
- Pages: 373
- ISBN: 978-1-78763-219-6
- OCLC: 1129080589
- Dewey Decimal: 813/.54
- LC Class: PS3553.H4838 B58 2019
- Preceded by: Past Tense
- Followed by: The Sentinel

Blue Moon is the twenty-fourth book in the Jack Reacher series written by Lee Child, and the last to be written by Lee Child alone. The book was released on United States, Canada, United Kingdom, New Zealand, Australia and Ireland by Bantam Press and Delacorte Press on October 29, 2019. It is written in the third person.

== Plot ==
Jack Reacher gets off a bus in an unnamed city after spotting a mugger trying to rob an elderly man. He foils the mugging, and the man introduces himself as Aaron Shevick. He reveals that the large bundle of cash he's carrying is intended for a loan shark named Fisnik who is associated with the local Albanian mafia, headed up by a mobster named Dino. Unbeknownst to both Reacher and Shevick, Fisnik is already dead, having been murdered on Dino's orders after Gregory, the boss of the rival Ukrainian mafia, framed him and another Albanian gangster as police informants.

Posing as Shevick, Reacher meets the Ukrainians who have taken over Fisnik's operation, eventually killing two of them by staging a car accident. At Shevick's home, Reacher questions Shevick and his wife Maria after noticing that the couple has sold nearly everything of value they own. The couple explain that their adult daughter, Meg, is suffering from late stage cancer but cannot afford treatment. Meg's former boss, Maxim Trulenko, had bankrupted his own company through embezzlement and vanished, leaving her without health insurance or a severance package. The Shevicks were subsequently forced to sign an agreement with the hospital to pay for Meg's treatment in advance, and even with multiple pro bono lawyers working on their case, they have no other option but to take out loans from the mob.

Dino orders two of Gregory's men gunned down in retaliation for deceiving him. Gregory, having just learned about the deaths of his other two men, believes that the Albanians are preparing for war and has two Albanian bagmen killed and put on display outside Dino's office. Meanwhile, Reacher begins to search for Trulenko, who he suspects is still hiding in the city. His investigation is noticed by the Ukrainians, and Reacher manages to hide from them with the help of Abigail "Abby" Gibson, a waitress employed at a small bar that pays protection to Gregory. They go to bring food to Shevick, only to learn that Maria is missing. Dino has the Ukrainian owners of a massage parlor abducted and killed, but Gregory forgoes further retaliation after learning about Reacher, ordering him to be found.

Reacher, Abigail and Shevick find Maria at a pawnshop and bring her home just as Gregory's men show up. Abby and Aaron trick them into leaving, and Reacher captures two of Gregory's men for questioning, only to kill them when they resist. Needing a new place to hide, Abigail takes Reacher to stay with her friends, musicians Frank Barton and Joe Hogan, and when Reacher manages to steal phones from both a Ukrainian and an Albanian soldier, Joe enlists a retired United States Army officer, Guy Vantresca, to help them translate the various text messages on the phones. The group eventually deduces that Trulenko is working with the Ukrainians to run a fake news content farm for the Russian government within U.S. borders, ensuring that it cannot be blocked by American authorities.

The Albanians finally locate Reacher after he accidentally leaves one of their stolen cars unsecured while delivering food to the Shevicks. He and Abigail are brought to Dino's office just as an argument breaks out between Dino and his underboss, Jetmir, whom Dino accuses of plotting against him. Jetmir shoots his boss dead and is subsequently killed by another Albanian. The mobsters start firing at each other and Reacher uses the chaos to free himself and kill all of the remaining Albanians before setting fire to their headquarters. Gregory, fearing that he'll be next, tries to kidnap Maria but fails. An enraged Reacher then locates his office, guns down his men and kills Gregory by pushing a heavy bookcase over on him, breaking his neck.

Guided by Reacher's guess as to where it might be, Vantresca is able to pinpoint the exact location of Trulenko's content farm–the middle floors of a large office building downtown. Reacher, Abby, Barton, Hogan and Vantresca pose as maintenance workers and access the building, slowly working their way through all of the security measures and killing several guards until they finally locate Trulenko. Reacher forces him at gunpoint to transfer all of his money, as well as Gregory's, into Shevick's personal account before shooting him dead and tipping off a Washington Post reporter about the content farm's existence to ensure that it will be shut down and hide everyone's involvement.

With the Shevicks now able to pay for Meg's care and rebuild their lives, Reacher spends one final night with Abigail before they go their separate ways. Reacher makes his way to the depot and quietly boards a bus heading west, resuming his original journey.

== Reception ==
The novel received mixed reviews from critics. Publishers Weekly called it "riveting" and a "nail-biter". Kirkus Reviews stated that the novel had "the best premise for a Reacher novel in some time" — and emphasized that this was an indicator that "something has gone off in the series", criticizing the exposition and Child's techniques for depicting violence.

The Hindustan Times found it to be not Child's best work, but nonetheless "engaging and diverting", and noted that its "sense of sameness" (compared to the other books in the series) was "comforting". In the Evening Standard, Mark Sanderson called it "morality pornography", with the action sequences being "operatic, almost comedic". In particular, Sanderson faulted Abby the waitress for having "all the personality of a sexbot".
