= In Too Deep (Child novel) =

2024 novel by Lee and Andrew Child

- Hardcover edition
- Author: Lee Child and Andrew Child
- Language: English
- Series: Jack Reacher
- Release number: 29
- Genre: Thriller
- Publisher: Bantam Press (United Kingdom); Delacorte Press (United States)
- Publication date: October 22, 2024
- Publication place: United Kingdom
- Media type: Print (hardcover and paperback)
- Pages: 384
- ISBN: 978-0-85750-559-0
- OCLC: 1453288999
- Dewey Decimal: 813/.54
- LC Class: PS3553.H4838 I58 2024
- Preceded by: The Secret
- Followed by: Exit Strategy

In Too Deep is the twenty-ninth novel in the Jack Reacher series written by Lee Child and Andrew Child. It is the fifth Jack Reacher novel co-authored by Lee Child, whose real name is James Dover Grant, and his younger brother Andrew Grant, published under their respective pen names of Lee Child and Andrew Child.

The book was released on United States, Canada, United Kingdom, New Zealand, Australia and Ireland by Bantam Press and Delacorte Press on October 22, 2024. It is written in the third person.

== Plot ==
Jack Reacher awakens handcuffed to a steel table, with a broken wrist, concussion. He cannot remember how he arrived. Ivan Vidic surveys a wrecked SUV, its driver, Gibson, is dead; Reacher, a passenger, survived. Vidic and Darren Fletcher take both men to their mansion. Vidic tells Paris to bring phosphorus to destroy Gibson's remains.

Fletcher questions Reacher, but Reacher escapes. Vidic claims he rescued him and says Gibson was an undercover FBI agent. He offers to disclose Fletcher's next robbery if Reacher helps move a safe holding $2.2 million. Vidic says the mansion became an art-forgery studio after the 2008 financial crash. Reacher notices damage on Vidic's Jeep.

At a motel, Reacher contacts FBI agent Ronny Wallwork and reports a dead agent known as Albatross. Jenny Knight arrives, mistaking Reacher for gang enforcer Zach Kane. She is a suspended Phoenix detective whose father Kane shot during a gallery robbery. They join forces, and Wallwork confirms the dead man was an FBI agent.

Tracking devices help Reacher and Knight identify a robbery target. At Fletcher's mansion, they find Gibson's body, phosphorus, and a coded notebook. A laptop presentation names a Russian-owned house containing art, jewelry, and diamonds worth more than $700 million. Reacher realizes Vidic lied and goes there. He captures Fletcher, Vidic, and Kane; Paris remains at an abandoned gold mine.

At the mine, Reacher disarms Paris and learns that the crew hacked companies, then demanded payment for stolen data. The fixers hired by a property developer abducted Bowery, Knight, and Vidic. Reacher arranges their release. Kane escapes, leaving Fletcher and Vidic for federal agents. A phosphorus trap destroys the mansion.

FBI agent Laura Devine questions Reacher about Cone Dynamics, named in a stolen report. Reacher suspects it concerns nuclear weapons. He discovers Vidic, not Gibson, was Albatross. Vidic caused the crash after fearing Gibson had seen him meet an FBI handler, then tried to make Gibson's death appear to be his own.

Reacher warns Devine that Vidic's Alaska flight is a false trail and that a recovered report extract is incomplete. He and Knight travel to Fort Lauderdale, where Reacher obtains an encrypted data stick. At a hangar, Kane kills Vidic and Paris, then leaves for Andros Island with associates and gold bars. They follow, Reacher defeats Kane, but Knight stops him from killing him, saying her father wanted a trial.

The report says fissile material in American nuclear warheads degrades sooner than expected, leaving 1950s-built weapons unable to detonate. Devine says the matter is classified and promises Knight reinstatement. At the airport, Knight gives Reacher an encoded message and her phone number, inviting him to decipher it when ready.

== Reception ==
In Too Deep received mixed reviews from critics. Publishers Weekly praised the novel's fast-paced action and familiar portrayal of Jack Reacher, describing it as an entertaining addition to the series, although noting that its plot was overly complicated. In contrast, Kirkus Reviews criticized the simpler storytelling and considered the novel less thrilling than previous installments, describing it as a comparatively basic entry in the series.
