= Jack Reacher (novel series) =

Series of novels and stories by Lee Child

Jack Reacher is a series of novels, novellas and short stories by British author Jim Grant under the pen name Lee Child. The book series chronicles the adventures of Jack Reacher, a former major in the United States Army Military Police Corps and now a drifter, roaming the United States taking odd jobs and investigating suspicious and frequently dangerous situations, some of which are of a personal nature. The Reacher series has maintained a schedule of one book per year, except for 2010, when two installments were published. As of November 2025, the series includes 30 books and a short story collection.

The settings for many of the novels are in the United States of America, ranging from major metropolitan areas like New York City, Los Angeles, and Washington, D.C., to small rural towns in the Midwestern United States and Southern United States. Reacher's travels outside the United States include rural England (The Hard Way, Maybe They Have a Tradition), London (Personal), Hamburg (Night School), and Paris (The Enemy and Personal).

Some of the novels have been adapted for the screen; the character was portrayed by Tom Cruise in a 2012 film (One Shot) and a 2016 sequel (Never Go Back), as well as Alan Ritchson in a streaming television series (from Killing Floor, Bad Luck and Trouble, Persuader, Gone Tomorrow, Make Me), which premiered on Amazon Prime Video in 2022.

== Novel series ==
Series no.	Chrono. order	Title	ISBN	Date of publication	POV	Summary
1	5	Killing Floor	0-515-12344-7	March 1997	1st	Jack Reacher gets off a Greyhound bus in the fictional town of Margrave, Georgia, because he remembers that a blues musician named Blind Blake was interred there. Shortly after his arrival he is arrested in a local diner for murder. As he fights to prove his innocence Reacher learns the unidentified murder victim is his brother Joe, a Federal Government Agent working a case. Though the first published novel, it is the fifth one in terms of the in-story chronology. This novel was adapted for the first season of the 2022 series, Reacher, starring Alan Ritchson in the titular role.
2	6	Die Trying	0-399-14379-3	July 1998	3rd	Just as Reacher helps Holly Johnson, an attractive young woman struggling with her crutches on a Chicago street, they are both kidnapped at gunpoint. Reacher and the woman are thrown into a dark van and taken 2,000 miles across the United States, completely unaware why they were kidnapped and where they are going. Finding themselves trapped in a seemingly remote place, they must work together to find the answers.
3	7	Tripwire	0-515-14307-3	July 1999	3rd	Reacher is in Key West, digging pools by hand and moonlighting as a bouncer for a topless bar. He discovers the body of a New York investigator hired by "Mrs. Jacob" to find him. He finds out that she is attorney Jodie Garber, daughter of General Leon Garber, Reacher's recently deceased mentor and surrogate father in the Army. She wants his help investigating her father's last project, a search on behalf of the elderly parents of their military MIA son. Having inherited a house and gained a steady girlfriend, Reacher contemplates a sedentary life as he and Jodie find themselves hunted by a psychopath businessman and military criminal crippled in the Vietnam War, who has a shadowy business and other secrets to protect.
4	8	The Visitor (UK); Running Blind (US)	978-0-515-14350-8	April 2000	2nd / 3rd	Two women are found dead in their own homes—in baths filled with Army-issue camouflage paint, their bodies completely unmarked. Jack Reacher knew them, and he knows that they both left the Army under dubious circumstances, both victims of sexual harassment. Reacher is under suspicion and arrested. As a former US military policeman, a loner and a drifter, he matches the psychological criminal profile prepared by FBI Special Agent Julia Lamarr. When another woman is killed the same way while Reacher is under surveillance, he is released but pressured into helping the murder investigation. He has to find out what they have in common and why someone would kill more.
5	9	Echo Burning	0-515-13331-0	April 2001	3rd	Reacher hitches a ride in Texas. Carmen, the driver, is a mother of a young girl and is trapped in an abusive marriage. She requests Reacher's help. After some deliberation Reacher consents. However, at her remote ranch in Echo County Reacher encounters lies, prejudice and hatred climaxing in Carmen being arrested for the murder of her husband. With Carmen's true motives cast into doubt, Reacher finds himself investigating the truth.
6	10	Without Fail	978-0-515-14431-4	April 2002	3rd	Reacher arrives in Atlantic City, New Jersey, and is intercepted by Mary Ellen (M. E.) Froelich, a beautiful Secret Service agent. She has a special request: that Reacher tell her the various ways, were he an actual assassin, in which he could kill the vice-president; being made aware of any such methods would help her considerably in tightening her security detail in order to protect the Vice-president's life. He accepts the challenge, enlisting old colleague Frances Neagley to help carry out the mission. Suspicious and threatening letters have been sent to the vice-president and intercepted by his protective team. Together, they attempt to find those responsible.
7	11	Persuader	978-0-440-24598-8	April 2003	1st	Walking along the street, Reacher sees Francis Xavier Quinn, a man who should be dead, as he was responsible for the murder of two of Reacher's colleagues ten years ago. Now a chance encounter outside Boston's Symphony Hall shows Reacher that Quinn got away with murder. Reacher teams up with the DEA to penetrate a smuggling ring to get back at Quinn. This novel was adapted for the third season of the 2022 series, Reacher.
8	1	The Enemy	0-553-81585-7	April 2004	1st	On New Year's Day, 1990, in a North Carolina motel, a two-star general is found dead, suspected to have suffered a heart attack while having sex with a prostitute. Within minutes, Reacher is ordered to contain the situation to prevent embarrassment to the US Army. But matters escalate when Reacher discovers the general's briefcase is missing and is tasked with recovering an important agenda that it had contained. This is the first novel chronologically.
9	12	One Shot	0-385-33668-3	April 2005	3rd	In an innocent heartland city, five murders are committed by an expert sniper. The police quickly identify and arrest a suspect, James Barr, and build a slam-dunk case with iron-clad evidence. But the accused man claims he's innocent and says, "Get Jack Reacher." Reacher himself sees the news report and turns up in the city. Barr's defense attorney is relieved, but Reacher has come to bury Barr. Shocked by the request of the accused, Reacher sets out to confirm for himself the absolute certainty of the man's guilt, but comes up with more than he bargained for. This novel was adapted for the screen in 2012 as Jack Reacher, with Tom Cruise in the title role. In the Reacher TV series continuity, the events of One Shot are implied to have occurred between seasons 1 and 2.
10	13	The Hard Way	0-385-33669-1	May 2006	3rd	After witnessing an exchange of $1,000,000, Jack Reacher is hired by the underhanded director of a private military company to rescue his wife and stepchild, who appear to have been kidnapped. Reacher, enlisting the help of an ex-FBI private investigator, uncovers clues that might lead to a rescue, learning about the director's mysterious past in the process. The investigation leads him to the truth, and ultimately engage in a gun battle on a farm in Norfolk, England. The novel is set primarily in New York City.
11	14	Bad Luck and Trouble	0-385-34055-9	April 2007	3rd	When someone makes a small anonymous deposit into Reacher's bank account, it triggers his fixation for maths and his investigative instincts. Reacher deduces that the deposit is a signal only the eight former members of his elite team of army investigators would use. Obsessed with math like Reacher, Frances Neagley locates him because of the brutal death of one of their own. They race to reunite with the survivors of their old team and raise the living, bury the dead, and connect the dots in a mystery that grows more complex with more murders. With the lives of those Reacher considers family at stake, his usual emotionless demeanor breaks and he says of the killers, "They are dead men walking." The team falls into their old roles and routines with ease, their motto still their sacred rule: You do not mess with the Special Investigators. This novel was adapted for the second season of the 2022 series, Reacher.
12	15	Nothing to Lose	978-0-593-05702-5	March 2008	3rd	Traveling from the town of Hope, Colorado to the neighboring town of Despair, Reacher finds that he is an unwelcome visitor, which fuels his curiosity. Reacher decides to investigate the mystery behind the town's unwelcoming disposition towards visitors, unraveling in the process the secrets of Thurman, a powerful businessman who has employed the majority of the population of Despair to work in his recycling factory.
13	16	Gone Tomorrow	978-0-440-24368-7	April 2009	1st	During a late night subway ride with four other passengers, Reacher becomes troubled by one of his fellow passengers. Checking against his mental list for suicide bombers, he comes to the conclusion that the fourth is one. He is puzzled with her choice of timing and place, as it is not crowded; on the contrary the subway was exceedingly empty. He reasons with her, but she shoots herself; thereby proving Reacher wrong when he concluded she was a bomber. His determination to discover why she killed herself forms the plot of the story. This novel was adapted for the fourth season of the 2022 series, Reacher.
14	17	61 Hours	978-0-440-24369-4	March 2010	3rd	In South Dakota, a tourist bus crashes during a savage snow storm with Jack Reacher in it. Reacher gets caught up in a hunt for a murderer and the protection of a key witness.
15	18	Worth Dying For	978-0-385-34431-9	September 2010	3rd	Reacher arrives late one night in a rural Nebraska town. In the town's fading motel bar he overhears a drunk doctor's refusal to attend a victim of domestic abuse. Reacher intervenes, getting the doctor to attend to the victim while breaking the nose of the husband responsible for the abuse. It turns out that the husband is the scion of the powerful and rich Duncan clan, which maintains authority in that part of Nebraska. Reacher's intervention causes him to end up embroiled in a smuggling ring and an unsolved disappearance from twenty-five years prior.
16	4	The Affair	978-0-440-24630-5	27 September 2011	1st	March 1997. Six months before the events of Killing Floor. Jack Reacher is still in the army, and there is big trouble in a small town in Mississippi, where a soldier's girlfriend is found with her throat cut from ear to ear. Reacher must determine whether the killer is local, or from nearby Fort Kelham, a large base used by elite Army Rangers. Reacher's orders are to go undercover, keep his distance, and monitor the investigation. The army's official investigation and Reacher's undercover search point to different suspects, which puts pressure on Reacher, who must decide whether to speak out. This is the fourth novel chronologically.
17	19	A Wanted Man	978-0-440-24631-2	11 September 2012	3rd	To get to Virginia, Reacher hitches a ride from a group of three—two men and a woman. An hour behind them, the FBI descends on an old pumping station where a man was stabbed to death—the knife work professional, the killers nowhere to be seen. At the same time Reacher discovers the woman appears to be kidnapped and that the two men are the kidnappers. Reacher now finds himself tied to a volatile situation and it is up to him to try and defuse it.
18	20	Never Go Back	978-0-593-06574-7	3 September 2013	3rd	Culminating the story arc extending from 61 Hours, Reacher makes it to his destination in northeastern Virginia: the headquarters of his old unit, the 110th MP. On arriving though, Reacher finds out that the new commanding officer, Major Susan Turner, has been arrested. Soon he too finds himself taken into custody, pending the trial of two crimes he allegedly committed while he was in the army. Reacher and Turner set out on a journey; Turner in hopes of clearing her name and Reacher to prove the charges fraudulent or if true then atone for them. This novel was adapted for the screen in 2016 as Jack Reacher: Never Go Back, with Tom Cruise reprising the title role. In the Reacher TV series continuity, the events of Never Go Back are implied to have occurred between seasons 2 and 3.
19	21	Personal	978-0-593-07382-7	28 August 2014	1st	Reacher is tasked with finding out the person responsible for taking a long-distance shot at the French President, one of the suspects being a man Reacher tracked down once and put in jail sixteen years back for murder.
20	22	Make Me	978-0-8041-7877-8	8 September 2015	3rd	Reacher makes a stop in an agrarian town called Mother's Rest. There a woman, Michelle Chang, enlists his help to find a missing colleague. This novel will be adapted for the upcoming fifth season of the 2022 series, Reacher.
21	3	Night School	978-0-8041-7880-8	8 November 2016	3rd	Early 1996 finds Reacher, still in the army and fresh off a successful mission, placed into a top-secret multi-agency task force. A CIA informant in a Jihadist sleeper cell in Hamburg, Germany, has relayed the message "The American wants a hundred million dollars". With little else to go on, Reacher and his new associates are tasked with finding the buyer and the seller and determining what is being sold. Along with his longtime right-hand woman Sergeant Frances Neagley, Reacher heads to recently reunified Germany to get to the heart of the matter, and he quickly finds himself skirting neo-Nazi elements as he pursues the Middle-Eastern terrorists and the American traitor. This is the third novel chronologically.
22	23	The Midnight Line	978-0-399-59348-2	7 November 2017	3rd	This story directly follows Make Me, when Michelle Chang parts company with Jack Reacher. The book was published after the novella "Too Much Time" that is included in the collection of short stories in No Middle Name Released in May 2017. Jack Reacher sees a West Point Graduation ring in a pawn shop and buys it, determined to restore it to its original owner. He supposes the owner had some financial problems that caused the pawn sale, because nobody who earned it at West Point would willingly part with it unless they faced necessity.
23	24	Past Tense	978-0-399-59351-2	5 November 2018	3rd	Jack Reacher takes a detour to Laconia, NH, to visit his father's hometown. During his visit he learns about his father's past and helps a couple who stumble into a motel that turns out to be dangerous.
24	25	Blue Moon	978-1-78763-027-7	29 October 2019	3rd	Jack Reacher steps out of a bus to help a potential victim and then finds himself in the thick of a turf war between two rival gangs.
25	26	The Sentinel	978-1-9848-1846-1	27 October 2020	3rd	Jack Reacher hitches a ride to Pleasantville where he steps right into the middle of a kidnapping.
26	27	Better Off Dead	978-0-552-17752-8	26 October 2021	1st	Reacher is heading to San Francisco and comes across a wrecked car near a small border town in Arizona. He helps the female occupant who is on a quest to find her twin brother. But the brother turns out to be a violent criminal.
27	28	No Plan B	978-1-78763-375-9	25 October 2022	3rd	A woman throws herself in front of a bus. Although seemingly suicide, Jack Reacher sees what really happened - a man pushing the victim to her death and stealing her bag. He follows the killer and discovers the event is part of a much larger, secret conspiracy.
28	2	The Secret	978-1-78763-377-3	24 October 2023	3rd	It is 1992. Scientists formerly employed by the US government are dying in suspicious circumstances. Leaders in the defense department mobilize a multi-agency task force, including the recently demoted Captain Reacher. This is the second novel chronologically.
29	29	In Too Deep	978-0-85750-560-6	21 October 2024	3rd	Jack Reacher is handcuffed in darkness after a car crash. A dead FBI agent and criminal schemes are part of it.
30	30	Exit Strategy	978-0-85750-561-3	4 November 2025	3rd	Jack Reacher is in a Baltimore coffee shop and receives a message from a stranger.
31	31	Chain Reaction	978-1-91175-424-4	20 October 2026	3rd	Jack Reacher is in a town where a small incident becomes large.

== Short stories and novellas ==
Reacher has also appeared in several short stories by Child. "Second Son," "Deep Down" and "Not a Drill" were all released originally for the Amazon Kindle although "Second Son" was later included in the American & Canadian paperback and Kindle editions of The Affair, and "Deep Down" with the American & Canadian paperback and Kindle editions of A Wanted Man. "High Heat" with the American paperback and Kindle editions of Never Go Back, "Everyone Talks" with the UK edition of Never Go Back, "Not a Drill" with the American paperback of Personal, and "The Fourth Man" with the Australian paperback of Past Tense.

=== "Second Son" ===
"Second Son" is a snapshot of the life of Reacher and his family circa 1974, while they are stationed on a military base in Okinawa. Upon arriving they immediately get into deep trouble that is compounded by some bad news. The action is interspersed with contemplative moments, such as when 13-year-old Jack's grandfather, a prosthetic-limb maker and World War I veteran in Paris, recounts that "... a great war leaves a country with three armies: an army of cripples, an army of mourners, and an army of thieves."

=== "Deep Down" ===
In 1986, summoned by military intelligence to Washington, DC, Reacher is sent undercover. The assignment that awaits him: the army is meeting with its Capitol Hill paymasters for classified talks on a new, state-of-the-art sniper rifle for US forces. But vital details about the weapon are leaking from someone at the top of the federal government and probably into the hands of unidentified foreign arms dealers. The prospect of any and every terrorist, mercenary, or dictator's militia getting their hands on the latest superior firepower is unthinkable. Reacher is tasked with infiltrating the top-secret proceedings and revealing the traitor. He targets a quartet of high-powered Army political liaison officers—all of them fast-track women on their way to the top. According to his bosses, it's a zero-danger mission, but Reacher knows that things are rarely what they seem.

=== "Guy Walks into a Bar" ===
The story is set in the moments before the beginning of the novel Gone Tomorrow. Reacher, while at a blues music club, observes what he believes to be the beginning of a kidnapping as part of a Russian mafia dispute. This story was published in The New York Times on 6 June 2009.

=== "James Penney's New Identity" ===
The story features Reacher, still in the Army as a captain, helping James Penney, a Vietnam War veteran who has recently been made redundant at work and had his car stolen. When Penney unknowingly becomes a fugitive (after he accidentally burns down two neighbours' houses in the course of deliberately burning down his own in an act of frustration after being fired), Reacher helps Penney obtain a new identity so he can start a new life. The story has appeared in Fresh Blood 3 (1999), an anthology of mystery short stories edited by Mike Ripley and Maxim Jakubowski, and in Thriller (2006), a short story anthology of thrillers written by International Thrillers, Inc. members and edited by James Patterson.

=== "High Heat" ===
This novella, published in 2013, opens on 13 July 1977 with an almost seventeen-year-old Reacher stopping in New York in the middle of a heat wave to visit his brother at West Point when he encounters a woman (Jill Hemingway) being assaulted by a man. He drives off the man after a small scuffle, only to learn that the man is Croselli, one of the mob bosses of New York City. Croselli had slapped Hemingway for wearing a wire tape, and from this he deduced that Hemingway was an FBI agent. Hemingway warns him to leave the city before midnight or else Croselli would have his men kill him. They then part ways.

Reacher meets a brunette, Chrissie, at a coffee shop and they go to CBGB together using Chrissie's car. Inside the club they find Hemingway along with one of Croselli's henchmen, who promptly calls his boss on seeing Reacher. Meanwhile, Reacher learns that Jill Hemingway had been suspended from the FBI, pending review as part of the deal cut by Croselli with the FBI and that she was planning to bring him down. Reacher takes care of the henchman, just before a power outage strikes, before making his escape with Chrissie.

Chrissie and Reacher have sex in her car, when they encounter David Berkowitz, the "Son of Sam" serial killer, who has killed couples in cars. However, Berkowitz canot see Chrissie and leaves, but not before Reacher gets a good look at his posture and mannerisms.

Reacher and Chrissie meet Hemingway outside Croselli's hideout. Hemingway informs Reacher that due to the outage, Croselli's men are out protecting various businesses that paid him money, from looters and plunderers, leaving Croselli alone in his warren. Chrissie and Reacher part ways and Reacher breaks into the hideout to take care of Croselli but not before he gets him to profess his various crimes on tape. Reacher leaves Croselli tied to a chair with the tape at his feet and Hemingway calls in the FBI.

Hemingway also makes a call to the New York Police Department about the Son of Sam based on the description given to her by Reacher. They then go to a motel, where Jill dies of a myocardial infarction. Reacher leaves the motel after informing the police of her death.

The story ends with the Son of Sam being apprehended 28 days after the outage.

This story was initially released exclusively in the eBook format.

=== "Everyone Talks" ===
A short story published as part of the UK hardback edition of Never Go Back, the story is told from the perspective of a female detective investigating an alleged shooting. Reacher, while in the hospital, relates the events prior to the story beginning. This was also included in the June–July 2012 Esquire magazine. This story was also included as a small book with the Blu-ray release of the movie Jack Reacher: Never Go Back, released February 2017 in the US. The book is 5.5x6.75 inches, 10 pages long, with a few illustrations, some color, some black and white.

=== "Not a Drill" ===
Hitchhiking in Maine near the Canada–US border, Reacher is picked up by a trio of Canadians who claim to be outdoor enthusiasts. At the end of the road trip, Reacher parts ways with his companions and finds himself near a hiking trail sealed off by the US Army under mysterious circumstances. Reacher subsequently investigates the closure of the trail when one of the Canadians returns to seek his help.

=== "Good and Valuable Consideration" ===
This short story, co written by Lee Child and Joseph Finder, opens with Jack Reacher encountering two men, Nick Heller, a private spy and Jerry DeLong, a forensic accountant. Reacher and Heller soon find out that the chief enforcer for the Albanian mafia in Boston, Alex Dushku (also known as "Allie Boy"), will soon arrive to meet DeLong whom he is coercing into giving one of his enterprises a clean chit in a purported audit to be conducted by DeLong. Outside the bar, Reacher and Heller beat Dushku unconscious and steal his bribe money, which they then split between themselves before parting ways. DeLong, not having received the bribe money, is no longer under contractual obligation to carry out the subterfuge.

=== "Small Wars" ===
This story is set in 1989, when Jack Reacher is serving as an officer in the military police. A young lieutenant colonel in a stylish handmade uniform roars through the damp woods of Georgia in her new silver Porsche, until she meets a very tall soldier with a broken-down car.

=== "The Picture of the Lonely Diner" ===
This story takes place in Manhattan's Flatiron District. Jack Reacher has an unusual encounter in a diner reminiscent of the Edward Hopper painting "Nighthawks". It was part of the Mystery Writers' Guild anthology Manhattan Mayhem edited by Mary Higgins Clark.

=== No Middle Name: The Complete Collected Short Stories ===
This anthology includes a novella, "Too Much Time", and the short stories "Deep Down", "Everyone Talks", "Guy Walks into a Bar", "High Heat", "James Penney's New Identity" (the original version which is longer), "Maybe They Have a Tradition", "No Room at the Motel", "Not a Drill", "Second Son", "Small Wars", and "The Picture of the Lonely Diner".

=== "Faking a Murderer" ===
Temperance Brennan is being investigated for the murder of a reporter who was re-opening an old suicide case that Reacher investigated. Included in MatchUp, a collection of co-authored short stories by male and female thriller authors (Lee Child and Kathy Reichs).

=== "Too Much Time" ===
Reacher visits a hollowed-out town in Maine, where he witnesses a random bag-snatching but sees much more than a simple crime.

=== "The Christmas Scorpion" ===
On Christmas Eve, Jack Reacher stumbles into a no-name bar in the California desert. The last thing he expects is a blizzard—or a visit from the world's deadliest assassin.

=== "The Fourth Man" ===
Jack Reacher, ex-military drifter of no fixed abode, is stalked and tracked down by an FBI agent. She tells him that in a house raid in Sydney, Australian law enforcement found a list. There were four people on it, including him. The other three are dead. Hours later, Reacher is in the air, on his way to Sydney. What was the evil buried 25 years ago that has now resurfaced? Will Reacher be able to find the killers before they find him?

=== "Many Happy Returns" ===
Not long before Christmas, MI5 notices someone acting strangely on camera CCTV at Heathrow Airport. It was written for The Spectator newspaper, and published there on 16 December 2023. It is the 2nd Reacher Christmas story after The Christmas Scorpion, and is currently the only Reacher story solely written by Lee Child since his brother took over in 2020.

== Other authors' works ==
- Reacher is mentioned several times in the Stephen King novel Under the Dome, where he is described by the character Colonel Cox as "the toughest goddam Army cop that ever served, in my humble opinion." Lee Child's endorsement of Under the Dome appears on the cover of at least one edition of the book. This intertextual reference highlights mutual admiration between two bestselling authors. King's nod to Reacher reinforces the character's cultural impact beyond his own series.
- Similarly, The Jack Reacher Cases, a series of 11 books, by Dan Ames, mentions Reacher's name on many occasions, but the character does not appear in person.
- In the introduction to the short story "Good and Valuable Consideration," it is mentioned that while creating his "Nick Heller" series character, Joseph Finder borrowed many cues from the Jack Reacher series. The story is anthologized in the collection FaceOff, which pairs signature protagonists from two authors in co-written stories.

== In-story chronology ==
1. 1974 – Second Son (short story, 2011)
2. 1977 – High Heat (novella, 2013)
3. 1986 – Deep Down (short story, 2012)
4. 1989 – Small Wars (short story, 2015)
5. 1989/1990 - You Shook Me All Night Long (short story, 2024)
6. 1990 – The Enemy (2004)
7. James Penney's New Identity (short story, 1999; revised, shortened, and edited 2006)
8. 1992 – The Secret (2023)
9. 1996 – Night School (2016)
10. 1997 – The Affair (2011)
11. Killing Floor (1997)
12. Die Trying (1998)
13. Tripwire (1999)
14. The Visitor - aka Running Blind (2000)
15. Echo Burning (2001)
16. Without Fail (2002)
17. Persuader (2003)
18. One Shot (2005)
19. The Hard Way (2006)
20. Bad Luck and Trouble (2007)
21. Nothing to Lose (2008)
22. Guy Walks into a Bar... (short story, 2009)
23. Gone Tomorrow (2009)
24. 61 Hours (2010)
25. Worth Dying For (2010)
26. Knowing You're Alive (with Dr. Morgan Snow) (2011)
27. A Wanted Man (2012)
28. Everyone Talks (short story, 2012)
29. Never Go Back (2013)
30. Not a Drill (short story, 2014)
31. Personal (2014)
32. Good and Valuable Consideration (with Nick Heller) (2014)
33. No Room at the Motel (short story, 2014)
34. The Picture of the Lonely Diner (short story, 2015)
35. Make Me (2015)
36. Maybe they Have a Tradition (short story, 2016)
37. The Midnight Line (2017)
38. Faking a Murderer (with Temperance Brennan) (2017)
39. Too Much Time (short story, 2017)
40. The Christmas Scorpion (2017)
41. Past Tense (2018)
42. The Fourth Man (2018)
43. Cleaning the Gold (with Will Trent) (short story, 2019)
44. Smile (short story, compiled by Maxim Jakubowski in Invisible Blood, 2019)
45. Blue Moon (2019)
46. The Sentinel (2020)
47. Better Off Dead (2021)
48. New Kid in Town (short story, 2022)
49. No Plan B (2022)
50. Many Happy Returns (short story, 2023)
51. Over Easy (with Maggie Bird) (short story, 2024)
52. In Too Deep (2024)
53. Bat Out of Hell (short story, compiled by Don Bruns in Bat Out of Hell, July 2025)
54. A Better Place (short story contained in Reacher: The Stories Behind the Stories September 2025)
55. Exit Strategy (November 2025)

== Reception ==
The series has sold over 100 million copies worldwide.

== Shared authorship ==
On 18 January 2020, Lee Child announced that his younger brother Andrew Grant would take over as writer of the Jack Reacher novels, writing under the pen name of Andrew Child. The two brothers intend to write the next few novels together after which Andrew Grant will "strike out on his own".

Starting with the 25th novel in the series, The Sentinel (2020), all books in the series have been co-authored by and credited to both brothers.

== In other media ==
=== Audiobooks ===
All of the Jack Reacher novels have been released in audio form narrated by a number of different voice actors, notably Jeff Harding, Scott Brick, and Dick Hill.

=== Films ===
Paramount Pictures hired Academy Award–nominated screenwriter Josh Olson to adapt the 9th novel One Shot, under the title Jack Reacher. Christopher McQuarrie, Oscar-winning screenwriter for The Usual Suspects, was then brought in to rewrite Olson's draft. It was announced in July 2011 that Tom Cruise—a 5'7" (1.70 m) actor—would play Reacher, who is 6'5" (1.96 m) in the books. Lee Child said, "Reacher's size in the books is a metaphor for an unstoppable force, which Cruise portrays in his own way."

It was announced in September 2014 that Tom Cruise would reprise the role in the sequel Jack Reacher: Never Go Back, which would adapt the 18th novel, Never Go Back. McQuarrie did not direct, due to a commitment with another Cruise film, Mission: Impossible – Rogue Nation, and was replaced with Edward Zwick. The film was released 21 October 2016.

=== Television series ===
On 14 November 2018, Child announced that he made a deal with Skydance Television and Paramount Television to produce a Jack Reacher television series based on Child's novels. During this time, feature films production would be halted. He also stated that Cruise would not return to the role. He said he hoped the new actor would more properly represent Reacher. Paramount Television and Skydance Television are slated to produce the potential series. Child said of the recasting:

I really enjoyed working with Cruise. He's a really, really nice guy. We had a lot of fun. But ultimately the readers are right. The size of Reacher is really, really important and it's a big component of who he is...So what I've decided to do is – there won't be any more movies with Tom Cruise. Instead we're going to take it to Netflix or something like that. Long-form streaming television, with a completely new actor. We're rebooting and starting over and we're going to try and find the perfect guy.

On 15 July 2019, a television series adaptation of the series under the name Reacher starring Alan Ritchson (6'2", or 188 cm) was announced by Amazon with showrunner Nick Santora, writing and producing the series through Paramount Television and Skydance Media. On 14 January 2020, the television series was approved, with Child and Christopher McQuarrie executive producing the first season, which adapted the first novel in the series, Killing Floor. The series was released on 4 February 2022.
