= Richard J. Blackwell =

American philosopher (1929–2021)

Richard Blackwell
- Born: Richard Joseph Blackwell; July 31, 1929; Cleveland, Ohio, U.S.
- Died: October 10, 2021 (aged 92); St. Louis, Missouri, U.S.
- Spouse: Rosemary Gallagher

Education
- Education: John Carroll University; Saint Louis University (PhD, 1954)
- Doctoral advisor: Leonard J. Eslick

Philosophical work
- Era: Contemporary philosophy
- Region: Western philosophy
- School: Analytic philosophy
- Institutions: John Carroll University; Saint Louis University
- Doctoral students: Gary Gutting
- Main interests: Philosophy of science History of science Science and religion

Richard Joseph Blackwell (July 31, 1929 – October 10, 2021) was an American philosopher and professor emeritus of philosophy at Saint Louis University, where he held the Danforth Chair in the Humanities.

His research focused on the interactions between modern science and philosophy.

His PhD thesis (1954) was on Aristotle under the supervision of Leonard J. Eslick.

In 1999, the journal The Modern Schoolman published an issue in his honor.

== Selected publications ==
- Galileo, Bellarmine, and the Bible (University of Notre Dame Press; 1991) According to Google Scholar, it has been cited 200 times.
- Translation of Tommaso Campanella's A Defense of Galileo (University of Notre Dame Press; 1994)
