= The Affair (Child novel) =

2011 novel by Lee Child

- Hardcover edition
- Author: Lee Child
- Language: English
- Series: Jack Reacher
- Release number: 16
- Genre: Thriller
- Publisher: Bantam Press (United Kingdom); Delacorte Press (United States)
- Publication date: September 27, 2011
- Publication place: United Kingdom
- Media type: Print (hardcover and paperback)
- Pages: 427
- ISBN: 978-0-593-06570-9
- OCLC: 704383266
- Dewey Decimal: 813/.54
- LC Class: PS3553.H4838 A63 2011
- Preceded by: Worth Dying For
- Followed by: A Wanted Man

The Affair is the sixteenth book in the Jack Reacher series written by Lee Child. It was published on United States by Delacorte Press on September 27, 2011 and in the United Kingdom by Bantam Press on September 29, 2011. The Affair is a prequel set six months before Child's first novel, Killing Floor and sets out the explosive circumstances under which Reacher's career in the United States Army was terminated. This book is written in the first person.

== Plot ==
In March 1997, Major Jack Reacher is briefed by his superior, Colonel Leon Garber, on a troubling development in Mississippi: a woman has been found murdered, with signs of rape, and Captain Reed Riley, the commander at a nearby Army Ranger base, has emerged as a suspect. Garber informs Reacher that another military police investigator, Major Duncan Munro, has been assigned to investigate the murder; Reacher's job is to go undercover and ensure that Munro's investigation does not damage the military's public image. He also puts Reacher in touch with Colonel John James Frazer, who warns Reacher that Reed's father, Senator Carlton Riley, the chairman of the Senate Armed Services Committee, will become hostile to the army if his son is targeted.

Posing as a drifter, Reacher takes up residence in a local motel, goes for a meal and meets the local sheriff, Elizabeth Deveraux. A former Marine MP, she deduces Reacher's true identity and purpose but permits him to stay as long as he does not interfere with her investigation. Reacher does so anyway, and learns that the victim, Janice Chapman, was the third woman murdered in just the last few months; the other two were young women from the poorer, largely African American section of town. Reacher's old friend, Sergeant Frances Neagley, arrives with a warning to stay away from Deveraux, who she claims was dishonorably discharged from the service following an incident with a fellow Marine; Reacher disregards her advice.

As it becomes clear that Reed was indeed involved in Chapman's death and possibly the other murders, Reacher is ordered to cover up the evidence. After an investigative journalist and the younger brother of one of the murdered women is shot and killed, Reacher discovers that an independent militia from Tennessee has been assigned by someone inside the chain of command to destroy evidence of the murders, while Munro confirms that none of the other soldiers at the base, aside from Reed, could have committed the crime. Reacher and Deveraux eventually have sex at the motel.

When the mother of the dead boy commits suicide by standing in front of a moving train, Reacher travels to the Pentagon and confronts Frazer, having realized that he had a personal interest in protecting the army's relationship with Senator Riley. Frazer tries to kill Reacher with a hammer, but Reacher uses the same hammer to kill Frazer in self-defense. Neagley takes Reacher to Garber, who provides him with a confidential file painting Deveraux as a sociopath who broke the arm of another woman out of jealousy. Garber explains that the military is content to blame Deveraux for the murders, but since they have no jurisdiction on domestic soil, it has been decided to instead shut down the investigation and turn the matter over to local authorities. Reacher is told that if he agrees to drop the matter, his job will be secure, but he is allowed to leave with the file anyway.

To celebrate Reed's exoneration, his father organizes a visit to the base. Reacher learns that "Janice Chapman's" real name was Audrey Shaw, a former intern for Senator Riley who was paid to leave her position after they had an affair. He also deduces that the other women were involved with Reed at different times and may have become pregnant, which would have tarnished his reputation. After subduing a team of unarmed artillerymen sent to arrest him for violating orders, Reacher and Munro work to separate the Rileys from the rest of the partygoers, allowing Reacher to take them hostage. At gunpoint, Senator Riley confesses what Reacher already knew: Deveraux's file was forged to clear his son, Reed murdered the first two women and then killed Chapman for the fun of it. Reacher then breaks both men's necks before leaving them in a car to be demolished by an oncoming train.

To protect the army, Reacher invents a story that the Rileys were killed in an accident, and that the militia was responsible for the murders. In the course of his investigation, Reacher had been rude to a senior officer who was a member of the base's PR office. Garber informs Reacher that despite the very successful conclusion of the case, a complaint by this PR officer has resulted in Reacher being put on likely-permanent desk duty. Reacher decides to resign from the service and sets out on the road.
