= Gary Gutting =

American philosopher (1942–2019)

- Born: Gary Michael Gutting; April 11, 1942
- Died: January 18, 2019 (aged 76)
- Spouse: Anastasia Friel Gutting
- Children: Tasha Alexander

Education
- Education: Saint Louis University (PhD, 1968)
- Thesis: The Logic of Discovery in Theoretical Physics (1968)
- Doctoral advisor: Richard J. Blackwell

Philosophical work
- Era: Contemporary philosophy
- Region: Western philosophy
- School: Analytic philosophy (early); Continental philosophy (later)
- Institutions: University of Notre Dame
- Main interests: Contemporary French philosophy, philosophy of science, philosophy of religion

Gary Michael Gutting (April 11, 1942 – January 18, 2019) was an American philosopher and holder of an endowed chair in philosophy at the University of Notre Dame. His daughter is writer Tasha Alexander.

== Work ==
Gutting was an expert on the philosopher Michel Foucault and an editor of Notre Dame Philosophical Reviews. Through his publications in such media outlets as The New York Times and The Stone, he adopted the role of a public intellectual. He dealt with both continental and analytic philosophy and had written on bridging the analytic–continental divide.

== Books ==
- Talking God: Philosophers on Belief, W. W. Norton & Company, 2016
- What Philosophy Can Do, W. W. Norton & Company, 2015
- Thinking the Impossible: French Philosophy since 1960, Oxford University Press, 2011
- What Philosophers Know: Case Studies in Recent Analytic Philosophy, Cambridge University Press, 2009
- Foucault: A Very Short Introduction, Oxford University Press, 2005
- French Philosophy in the Twentieth Century, Cambridge University Press, 2001
- Pragmatic Liberalism and the Critique of Modernity, Cambridge University Press, 1999
- Michel Foucault's Archaeology of Scientific Reason, Cambridge University Press, 1989
- Religious Belief and Religious Skepticism, University of Notre Dame Press, 1982
- Paradigms and Revolutions: Appraisals and Applications of Thomas Kuhn's Philosophy of Science. South Bend, Indiana: University of Notre Dame Press, 1980
- (ed.) Continental Philosophy of Science, Blackwell Publishers, 2005
