= The Enemy (Child novel) =

2004 novel by Lee Child

- First edition (UK)
- Author: Lee Child
- Language: English
- Series: Jack Reacher
- Release number: 8
- Genre: Thriller
- Publisher: Bantam Press (United Kingdom); Delacorte Press (United States)
- Publication date: April 5, 2004
- Publication place: United Kingdom
- Media type: Print (hardcover and paperback)
- Pages: 412
- ISBN: 0-593-05202-1
- OCLC: 53215854
- Dewey Decimal: 813/.54 22
- LC Class: PS3553.H4838 E54 2004
- Preceded by: Persuader
- Followed by: One Shot

The Enemy is the eighth book in the Jack Reacher series written by Lee Child. It was published in 2004 by Delacorte Press in America and Bantam in the United Kingdom. It is narrated in the first person. Chronologically, it is the first novel involving Jack Reacher (although at least one subsequently published short story is set earlier in Reacher's life).

== Plot ==
In the final hours of 1989, Major General Kenneth Kramer dies of a heart attack in a seedy North Carolina motel, apparently while in the company of a prostitute. Major Jack Reacher of the United States Army's Military Police Corps investigates the scene and concludes that the woman Kramer was with stole his briefcase. Reacher's superior, Colonel Leon Garber, orders him to deliver news of Kramer's death to his wife. Accompanied by a female officer, Lieutenant Summer, Reacher travels to Virginia only to find Kramer's wife murdered.

Reacher returns to the bar across the street from the motel in an attempt to identify the alleged prostitute; there, he first meets Delta Force operative Christopher Carbone. Reacher gets into a fight with a bouncer for having hit one of the strippers in the bar in an attempt to silence her. Afterwards, Reacher is told by the motel's night clerk that he heard a military vehicle leaving after Kramer's death, leading Reacher to conclude that the woman Kramer was with is a female army officer. He is later confronted by two officers, Colonel Coomer and Brigadier General Vassell, members of Kramer's staff, who inquire about the briefcase but leave after Reacher mentions Mrs. Kramer's death.

After Carbone is found murdered, Garber is suddenly transferred to a new command in South Korea and replaced with Colonel Willard, who instructs Reacher to write off Carbone's death as an accident. He also reveals that Carbone filed a complaint against Reacher accusing him of assaulting the bouncer, threatening to use it as evidence that Reacher killed Carbone unless he closes the investigation quickly. When David Brubaker, Carbone's commanding officer, is also found murdered, Reacher and Summer focus on the one thing missing from Kramer's newly recovered briefcase: the printed agenda from a conference he was supposed to attend for members of the armored divisions. Coomer and Vassell deny that such an agenda exists, and Willard escalates his pressure on Reacher.

In the midst of it all, Reacher receives a call from his older brother Joe informing him that their mother has died from cancer in Paris. After returning to the U.S. with Summer following the funeral, Reacher secures a meeting with the Army Chief of Staff and reveals his findings: with the dissolution of the Soviet Union imminent, Kramer and other officers stood to lose their positions with the downsizing of the armored divisions, and were preparing an elaborate P.R. scheme to persuade Congress to reject the plan. Having foreseen this, the Chief admits that he arranged for twenty of the army's best investigators, including Reacher, to be assigned to specific posts, using forged orders from Garber, to help prevent an internal coup. He notes that the Secretary of Defense is working with the plotters.

Reacher deduces that Kramer was lured to the motel by Carbone on the pretense of a homosexual tryst. Carbone stole the briefcase when Kramer died and informed Brubaker of its contents. He also set up Reacher to be formally charged with assault for the bouncer to cover his tracks. Coomer and Vassell, eager to recover the briefcase, set up an exchange between Carbone and their gofer, Major Marshall, who in turn killed Carbone and Brubaker. He also killed Kramer's wife while searching her house for the briefcase; Reacher realizes that Marshall also had a relationship with Kramer and killed his wife out of anger and jealousy.

After arresting Coomer and Vassell, Reacher travels to a firing range in the Mojave Desert to arrest Marshall in the middle of a training exercise. Marshall attempts to commit suicide by maneuvering the tanks into firing on his position, but Reacher shoots him in the shoulder and takes him into custody. The missing agenda is subsequently retrieved from Carbone's billet: it contains a plan to assassinate eighteen prominent infantry officers to cripple their modernization efforts. The evidence is turned over to military authorities, and the accused are sentenced to life imprisonment.

Reacher is informed that, due to the charge filed by Carbone, he will be demoted to the rank of captain unless he denies it since Carbone is deceased and can no longer be involved in any legal proceedings. Instead, Reacher accepts the charge, in part, to avoid disgracing Carbone's memory further. Before accepting his new command, Reacher tracks down the corrupt Willard and executes him in his own house, planting drugs on the body to hide his involvement. The story ends with Reacher reflecting on the fact that he never saw Summer again despite hearing that she received a promotion to Captain.

== Awards and nominations ==
- 2005 Dilys Award nomination.
- 2005 Barry Award winner, Best Novel.
