= The Sentinel (Child novel) =

2020 novel by Lee and Andrew Child

- Hardcover edition
- Author: Lee Child and Andrew Child
- Language: English
- Series: Jack Reacher
- Release number: 25
- Genre: Thriller
- Publisher: Bantam Press (United Kingdom); Delacorte Press (United States)
- Publication date: October 27, 2020
- Publication place: United Kingdom
- Media type: Print (hardcover and paperback)
- Pages: 384
- ISBN: 978-1-78763-361-2
- OCLC: 1233303909
- Dewey Decimal: 813/.54
- LC Class: PS3553.H4838
- Preceded by: Blue Moon
- Followed by: Better Off Dead

The Sentinel is the twenty-fifth book in the Jack Reacher series written by Lee Child. It is the first Jack Reacher book to be co-authored by James Grant and his younger brother Andrew Grant but published using their pen names of Lee Child and Andrew Child respectively.

The book was released on United States, Canada, United Kingdom, New Zealand, Australia and Ireland by Bantam Press and Delacorte Press on October 27, 2020. It is written in the third person.

== Plot ==
Jack Reacher arrives in Tennesse and visits a music venue. The guitarist says owner Derek Lockhart withheld the band's pay and threatened them. Reacher incapacitates Lockhart's bouncer and makes him pay $2,500.

Nearby, dismissed municipal IT manager Rusty Rutherford leaves home after ransomware disables the town's computer systems. The town leaders blame him, although he had warned them. Reacher spots an ambush, pulls Rutherford to safety, and fights the attackers, the police arrest both men.

The assailants are Russian operatives led by Natasha. Their handler, Speranski, has operated locally for over fifty years. Rutherford tells Reacher about Cerberus, a computer defense system he developed with former FBI partner Sarah Sands, its backup appeared to fail during the attack. Detective Goodyear dismisses the kidnapping and refuses to contact the FBI.

Speranski sends Marty, a corrupt former officer, to take Reacher to a gas station. Reacher overpowers Marty, who admits disposing of Russian evidence, including suitcases containing journalist Toni Garza's remains. Reacher and Rutherford visit businessman Henry Klostermann at the Spy House, once owned by Soviet agents called the Klich brothers.

FBI agent Margaret Fisher, undercover among the Russians, says an agent at Oak Ridge National Laboratory plans to steal The Sentinel, a classified program protecting election software in 48 states. Russia aims to undermine confidence in American elections. A property record could expose the agent, but the paper archive is burned. Rutherford's server holds an earlier copy, and Fisher asks Reacher to retrieve it before a Moscow specialist arrives.

Reacher and Sands recover eight servers, Rutherford confirms the data survives. Reacher gives a copy to Wallwork, Fisher arranges an exchange, with Reacher posing as a bodyguard selling the server.

A Russian technician examines a document naming a supposed third Klich brother. Fisher photographs it and helps Reacher escape. Sands compares the image with the original: it names Klostermann's mother, Natalia Matusak, as the third owner and sister of the Klich brothers. Fisher has supplied false records as a double agent.

Wallwork identifies Klostermann's daughter, Diane Smith, as the Russian agent at Oak Ridge. Reacher finds Fisher chained and tortured by Speranski. He defeats the agents, kills Speranski, and frees Fisher. With the exit sealed, Reacher climbs through a ventilation shaft. Klostermann's phone confirms his Soviet allegiance. Goodyear admits his part in a call from Reacher. Reacher disarms him and makes him help the FBI identify Brotherhood cells nationwide.

Two weeks afterward, townspeople welcome Rutherford back. The town's computer systems are restored after the insurance negotiator reduces the ransom. Reacher returns to Nashville to hear another band and ensure its members are paid.

== Reception ==
The Sentinel received generally positive reviews from critics, with praise for its action sequences, humour, pacing, and continuity with earlier Jack Reacher novels. Publishers Weekly praised the novel's procedural elements and inventive action sequences, noting that the collaboration maintained the series' established style. Booklist gave the novel a starred review, describing it as a successful continuation of the series. Kirkus Reviews praised its plot, pace, and action, concluding that it would satisfy fans of the series.
