= Reacher (TV series) =

2022 American television series

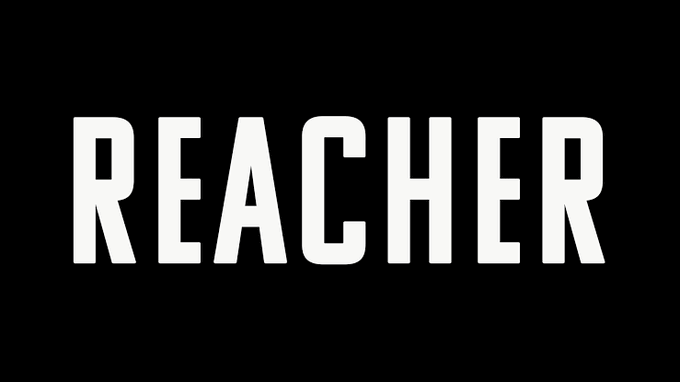
- Title card
- Genre: Action; Crime; Detective; Thriller; Drama
- Based on: Jack Reacher by Lee Child
- Developed by: Nick Santora
- Showrunner: Nick Santora
- Starring: Alan Ritchson; Malcolm Goodwin; Willa Fitzgerald; Chris Webster; Bruce McGill; Maria Sten; Serinda Swan; Shaun Sipos; Ferdinand Kingsley; Robert Patrick; Sonya Cassidy; Johnny Berchtold; Roberto Montesinos; Olivier Richters; Brian Tee; Anthony Michael Hall; Sydelle Noel; Agnez Mo; Anggun; Christopher Marquette; Kevin Corrigan
- Composer: Tony Morales
- Country of origin: United States
- Original language: English
- No. of seasons: 4
- No. of episodes: 32

Production
- Executive producers: Nick Santora; Scott Sullivan; Thomas Vincent; Paula Wagner; Marcy Ross; Lee Child; Don Granger; David Ellison; Dana Goldberg; Bill Bost; Adam Higgs; Matt Thunell; Mick Betancourt; Alan Ritchson; Amy Pocha; Seth Cohen; Sam Hill; Lisa Kussner
- Production locations: Ontario, Canada
- Cinematography: Bernard Couture; Michael McMurray; Ronald Plante
- Camera setup: Single-camera
- Running time: 41–58 minutes
- Production companies: Blackjack Films; Paramount Television Studios; Skydance Television (seasons 1–3); Amazon MGM Studios (Note: Also credited as Amazon Studios (seasons 1–2).)

Original release
- Network: Amazon Prime Video
- Release: February 4, 2022 – present

Related
- Neagley

Reacher is an American action crime television series developed by Nick Santora for Amazon Prime Video. Based on the Jack Reacher novel series by Lee Child, it stars Alan Ritchson as the title character, a self-proclaimed drifter and former U.S. Army military police officer with formidable strength, intellect, and abilities. During his travels, Reacher crosses paths with dangerous criminals and becomes involved in deep conspiracies.

The first season, based on the first novel in the series, Killing Floor, was released on February 4, 2022. The second season, based on the eleventh novel, Bad Luck and Trouble, premiered on December 15, 2023, and concluded on January 19, 2024. The third season, based on the seventh novel, Persuader, premiered on February 20, 2025, and concluded on March 27. The fourth season, based on the thirteenth novel, Gone Tomorrow, premiered on August 12, 2026, and concluded on September 16. The series has been renewed for a fifth season, based on the twentieth novel, Make Me, and a sixth season.

A spin-off series, Neagley, premiered on September 16, 2026.

== Premise ==
Jack Reacher is a former U.S. Army military police major with extensive investigative and combat experience who prefers to live as a drifter, travelling from town to town across the United States.

In the first season, Reacher visits the rural town of Margrave, Georgia, where he is arrested for the murder of a man who turns out to be his brother, Joe. After he is freed, he teams up with two honest police officers, Oscar Finlay and Roscoe Conklin, to investigate a local conspiracy involving corrupt lawmen, politicians, and a wealthy business tycoon and his son, who are running a counterfeiting syndicate.

In the second season, Reacher is contacted by Frances Neagley, a former member of his old army special investigations unit. She tells him of the murder of another unit member, and they assemble the unit's remaining members to avenge his death. Their investigation leads them to a technology company with a corrupt security division full of NYPD police officers conspiring with a ruthless arms dealer.

In the third season, Reacher attempts to rescue a DEA informant and delves into the dark heart of a rug-importing business that is a front for an arms trafficking enterprise led by Xavier Quinn, an enemy from his military past.

In the fourth season, Reacher encounters a troubled woman named Anna Merrick on a train that takes a dangerous turn, and finds himself caught up in a complex and deadly conspiracy involving a missing USB drive, and enemies at the highest ranks of power.

== Cast and characters ==
- Alan Ritchson as Jack Reacher, a former major in the U.S. Army military police with combat experience and extensive investigative skills, who is now a drifter and commits to vigilantism to thwart various criminal organizations
  - Maxwell Jenkins as young Jack Reacher (recurring season 1)
- Maria Sten as Frances Neagley (seasons 1–3), a corporate security professional who served with Reacher in the Army's 110th Special Investigations Unit as a master sergeant

=== Season 1 ===
- Malcolm Goodwin as Oscar Finlay (guest season 2), Margrave PD Police Captain and Chief Detective, and an ally of Reacher
- Willa Fitzgerald as Roscoe Conklin, Margrave PD Sergeant and an ally of Reacher
- Chris Webster as KJ Kliner, the entitled son of Kliner Sr. who is assisting his father's criminal operation
- Bruce McGill as Mayor Grover Teale, a crooked politician in league with the Kliner family

=== Season 2 ===
- Serinda Swan as Karla Dixon, a forensic accountant in corporate risk management, who served with Reacher in the 110th Special Investigations Unit
- Shaun Sipos as David O'Donnell, a lawyer with a family, who served with Reacher in the 110th Special Investigations Unit
- Ferdinand Kingsley as A.M., a seasoned mercenary and terrorist arms dealer travelling under multiple assumed identities
- Robert Patrick as Shane Langston, a former NYPD detective and the corrupt head of security for New Age, a private defense contractor

=== Season 3 ===
- Sonya Cassidy as Susan Duffy, a DEA agent who is leading an investigation into Zachary Beck
- Johnny Berchtold as Richard Beck, Zachary's son who lost his ear to terrorists
- Roberto Montesinos as Guillermo Villanueva, a DEA agent and member of Susan Duffy's team
- Olivier Richters as Paul "Paulie" van Hoven, Zachary Beck's hulking bodyguard and Quinn's henchman
- Brian Tee as Francis Xavier Quinn / Julius McCabe, a corrupt former U.S. military intelligence lieutenant colonel-turned-arms dealer and previous nemesis of Reacher
- Anthony Michael Hall as Zachary Beck, the owner of an oriental rug importer, Bizarre Bazaar

=== Season 4 ===
- Sydelle Noel as Tamara Green, a detective in the Philadelphia Police Department
- Agnez Mo as Lila Hoth, an Indonesian assassin posing as a journalist
- Anggun as Amisha Hoth, an Indonesian assassin and Lila's mentor
- Christopher Marquette as Jacob "Jake" Merrick, a small-town police officer and the brother of Anna Merrick
- Kevin Corrigan as Shaun Docherty, Tamara's partner

=== Season 5 ===
- Jay Baruchel as Chief Buck Bauer
- Kevin Durand as Nokes
- Amanda Ip as Michelle Chang
- Ciara Bravo as Eunice

== Episodes ==
Season	Episodes	Originally released	
Season	Episodes	First released	Last released
1	8	February 4, 2022	
2	8	December 15, 2023	January 19, 2024
3	8	February 20, 2025	March 27, 2025
4	8	August 12, 2026	September 16, 2026

=== Season 1 (2022) ===
No. overall	No. in season	Title	Directed by	Written by	Original release date
1	1	"Welcome to Margrave"	Thomas Vincent	Nick Santora	February 4, 2022
2	2	"First Dance"	Sam Hill	Scott Sullivan	February 4, 2022
3	3	"Spoonful"	Stephen Surjik	Aadrita Mukerji	February 4, 2022
4	4	"In a Tree"	Christine Moore	Cait Duffy	February 4, 2022
5	5	"No Apologies"	Norberto Barba	Scott Sullivan	February 4, 2022
6	6	"Papier"	Omar Madha	Aadrita Mukerji	February 4, 2022
7	7	"Reacher Said Nothing"	Lin Oeding	Scott Sullivan	February 4, 2022
8	8	"Pie"	MJ Bassett	Nick Santora	February 4, 2022

=== Season 2 (2023–24) ===
No. overall	No. in season	Title	Directed by	Written by	Original release date
9	1	"ATM"	Sam Hill	Nick Santora	December 15, 2023
10	2	"What Happens in Atlantic City"	Sam Hill	Scott Sullivan	December 15, 2023
11	3	"Picture Says a Thousand Words"	Omar Madha	Penny Cox	December 15, 2023
12	4	"A Night at the Symphony"	Omar Madha	Cait Duffy	December 22, 2023
13	5	"Burial"	Carol Banker	Scott Sullivan	December 29, 2023
14	6	"New York's Finest"	Carol Banker	Cait Duffy & Michael J. Gutierrez	January 5, 2024
15	7	"The Man Goes Through"	Julian Holmes	Penny Cox & Lillian Wang	January 12, 2024
16	8	"Fly Boy"	Julian Holmes	Scott Sullivan	January 19, 2024

=== Season 3 (2025) ===
No. overall	No. in season	Title	Directed by	Written by	Original release date
17	1	"Persuader"	Sam Hill	Scott Sullivan	February 20, 2025
18	2	"Truckin'"	Sam Hill	Penny Cox	February 20, 2025
19	3	"Number 2 with a Bullet"	Gary Fleder	Cait Duffy	February 20, 2025
20	4	"Dominique"	Sam Hill	Lillian Wang	February 27, 2025
21	5	"Smackdown"	Sam Hill	Michael J. Gutierrez	March 6, 2025
22	6	"Smoke on the Water"	Sam Hill	Scott Sullivan	March 13, 2025
23	7	"L.A. Story"	Sam Hill	Penny Cox & Cait Duffy	March 20, 2025
24	8	"Unfinished Business"	Sam Hill	Scott Sullivan	March 27, 2025

=== Season 4 (2026) ===
No. overall	No. in season	Title	Directed by	Written by	Original release date
25	1	"City of Brotherly Love"	Sam Hill	Nick Santora	August 12, 2026
26	2	"Cage Fight"	Sam Hill	Scott Sullivan	August 12, 2026
27	3	"One Small Step"	Sam Hill	Seth Cohen & Amy Pocha	August 12, 2026
28	4	"Karambits and Pieces"	Gary Fleder	Penny Cox	August 19, 2026
29	5	"Bridge"	Gary Fleder	Cait Duffy	August 26, 2026
30	6	"Plum Out of Luck"	Gary Fleder	Mick Betancourt & Seth Cohen & Amy Pocha	September 2, 2026
31	7	"Vote for Sampson"	Sam Hill	Scott Sullivan	September 9, 2026
32	8	"Cut"	Sam Hill	Scott Sullivan	September 16, 2026

== Production ==
=== Development ===
On July 15, 2019, a TV series adaptation of Lee Child's Jack Reacher novels was announced by Amazon. Nick Santora, who created Scorpion, was set to write, showrun, and produce the series through Paramount Television and Skydance Media. On January 14, 2020, the TV series was greenlit, with Scott Sullivan, Thomas Vincent, Paula Wagner, Marcy Ross, Don Granger, David Ellison, Dana Goldberg, and Bill Bost as executive producers with Child. The first season was announced as an adaptation of Child's novel Killing Floor. In July 2021, it was announced M. J. Bassett had joined the series as a director. On February 7, 2022, Amazon Prime Video renewed the series for a second season.

To adapt the books to screen the writers decided they would need to make Reacher verbalize his thoughts more often, but that they would keep his dialogue short and direct and have him only speak longer to people he respects. They also decided to introduce Neagley to the series earlier than in the books. In December 2023, ahead of the second-season premiere, it was revealed that filming of a third season had begun. In October 2024, ahead of the third season premiere, Amazon renewed the series for a fourth season, adapting the 2009 novel Gone Tomorrow. In May 2026, the series was renewed for a fifth season, adapting the 2015 novel Make Me. Ritchson revealed that the season was originally going to adapt the book Die Trying, but that changed after the re-election of Donald Trump in the 2024 United States presidential election. In September, the series was renewed for a sixth season.

Child mentioned that there are books that will probably never be adapted, either because of the setting, the tone of the story, or the story itself, such as 61 Hours, one of the most requested by fans.

=== Casting ===
On September 4, 2020, Alan Ritchson was cast in the title role. On March 22, 2021, Malcolm Goodwin, Willa Fitzgerald, and Chris Webster were cast as series regulars. On May 19, 2021, Bruce McGill, Maria Sten, and Hugh Thompson joined the main cast. On June 11, 2021, Kristin Kreuk, Marc Bendavid, Willie C. Carpenter, Currie Graham, Harvey Guillén, and Maxwell Jenkins were announced to have joined the cast in undisclosed capacities.

On September 14, 2022, Shaun Sipos joined as a series regular for the second season. On September 21, 2022, Serinda Swan, Ferdinand Kingsley, and Rory Cochrane joined the main cast while Domenick Lombardozzi, Luke Bilyk, Dean McKenzie, Edsson Morales, Andres Collantes, Shannon Kook, Ty Olsson, Josh Blacker, and Al Sapienza were cast in guest roles for the second season. Goodwin, Swan and Lombardozzi already starred in Santora's Breakout Kings in 2011. On May 5, 2023, Robert Patrick was cast to replace Cochrane who left due to a scheduling conflict with the second season.

On February 8, 2024, Anthony Michael Hall and Sonya Cassidy were cast as series regulars for the third season. On March 6, 2024, Brian Tee, Johnny Berchtold and Roberto Montesinos were cast as regulars of the third season, while Daniel David Stewart was cast in a recurring role. In May 2024, bodybuilder Olivier Richters, also known as "the Dutch Giant", was cast as Persuader's secondary antagonist Paulie.

On June 13, 2025, Jay Baruchel, Sydelle Noel, Agnez Mo, Anggun, and Kevin Corrigan were cast as series regulars for the fourth season while Kevin Weisman, Marc Blucas, and Kathleen Robertson were cast in recurring roles. Later that month, Baruchel was replaced by Christopher Marquette after exiting the series due to a personal matter.

On July 29, 2026, Kevin Durand, Amanda Ip, and Ciara Bravo were cast as series regulars for the fifth season while Baruchel, who was previously set to appear in the fourth season, rejoined the cast as a series regular. In November 2026, Ari Stidham joined the cast.

=== Filming ===
A temporary townscape was built in North Pickering, Ontario to support filming of the first season. The entire fictional city of Margrave was built from the ground up in a leased farm field in Ontario. Other areas of filming include Toronto, Port Perry and Pickering. Principal photography of the first season took place between April 15 and July 30, 2021, in Toronto. During filming, Ritchson broke a bone in his shoulder, which required surgery. He also tore an abdominal muscle during a fight scene.

Filming for the second season took place between September 2022 and March 2023. The season was filmed in various locations in Ontario, Canada, including Toronto, Brampton and Hamilton.

Filming for the third season took place in between July and November 2023. Different parts of Canada served as backdrops, including Millbrook, Brantford and Downtown St. John's.

Principal photography for the fourth season began on June 16, 2025, with former US President Joe Biden and his son visiting the set in Rittenhouse Square in Philadelphia. Filming wrapped by November 18, 2025.

Principal photography for the fifth season began on July 20, 2026.

== Release ==
The first season's episodes were released on February 4, 2022. For the second season, the first three episodes were released on December 15, 2023, with an additional episode released each week through January 19, 2024. For the third season, the first three episodes were released on February 20, 2025, with an additional episode released each week through March 27. For the fourth season, the first three episodes premiered on August 12, 2026, with an additional episode released each week through September 16.

== Reception ==
=== Audience ===
Reacher was the most streamed television series for the week of February 7–13, 2022, according to the Nielsen streaming rankings, the first Amazon production to achieve the feat.

=== Critical response ===
Critical response of Reacher
Season	Rotten Tomatoes	Metacritic
1	92% (74 reviews)	69 (19 reviews)
2	98% (44 reviews)	79 (14 reviews)
3	98% (46 reviews)	77 (13 reviews)
4	94% (33 reviews)	77 (11 reviews)

For the first season, the review aggregator website Rotten Tomatoes reported a 92% approval rating with an average rating of 7.3/10, based on 75 critic reviews. The website's critics consensus reads, "Reacher captures the trademark bulk of its titular hero while trading away some of his definition, but fans of the novels will find plenty to love about this faithful adaptation." Metacritic, which uses a weighted average, assigned a score of 68 out of 100 based on 18 critics, indicating "generally favorable reviews".

Lucy Mangan of The Guardian said, "This rollicking adaptation of Lee Child's man-mountain ex-military sleuth is hugely fun, packed with punchups and far better than Cruise's movie efforts." Michael Hogan of The Telegraph wrote, "Reacher is huge, pulpy fun and far classier than you might expect." Joshua Alston of Variety praised the casting of Ritchson but said the character was unsuitable to carry this kind of show: "the longer it runs, the more obvious its protagonist-shaped void becomes". Dan Fienberg of The Hollywood Reporter called it "frustratingly over-faithful to the source material", saying, "I wouldn't mind another season, but I'd probably still rather read another book."

The second season has a 98% approval rating on Rotten Tomatoes, based on 43 critic reviews, with an average rating of 7.8/10. The website's critics consensus states, "Brawny as Alan Ritchson's biceps, Reacher swaggers confidently into its sophomore season as rock 'em sock 'em pulp with a sly wink." Metacritic, which uses a weighted average, assigned a score of 79 out of 100 based on 14 critics, indicating "generally favorable reviews". Conversely, Forbes panned the second season as "one of the worst shows on TV", adding that "there's just not enough going on to make him (Reacher) a particularly compelling protagonist".

The third season has a 98% approval rating on Rotten Tomatoes, based on 42 critic reviews, with an average rating of 8.1/10. The website's critics consensus states, "Jack Reacher finally picks a fight with someone his own size in this crunchy third season, reliably doling out justice to foes and satisfaction to viewers." Metacritic assigned a score of 76 out of 100 based on 11 critics, indicating "generally favorable reviews". The latest season was complimented by Forbes for having improved after certain disappointments from the previous season.

The fourth season has a 94% approval rating on Rotten Tomatoes, based on 33 critic reviews, with an average rating of 7.5/10. The website's critics consensus states, "Reacher maintains its formula for maximum entertainment, serving more brawn, enough narrative brains, and always the right amount of Alan Ritchson to keep the operation up and running for seasons to come." Metacritic assigned a score of 77 out of 100 based on 11 critics, indicating "generally favorable reviews".

== Spin-off ==
On September 4, 2024, it was announced that a spin-off series focusing on the Reacher series regular Frances Neagley was in development at Amazon Prime Video with Maria Sten set to reprise her role. On October 1, 2024, it was announced that Prime Video had greenlit the series with Santora and Nicholas Wootton serving as showrunners for the series. Filming on Neagley commenced in Toronto in February 2025. The series premiered on September 16, 2026. In October 2026, the series was renewed for a second season.
