= Lee Child =

British thriller writer (born 1954)

Lee Child CBE
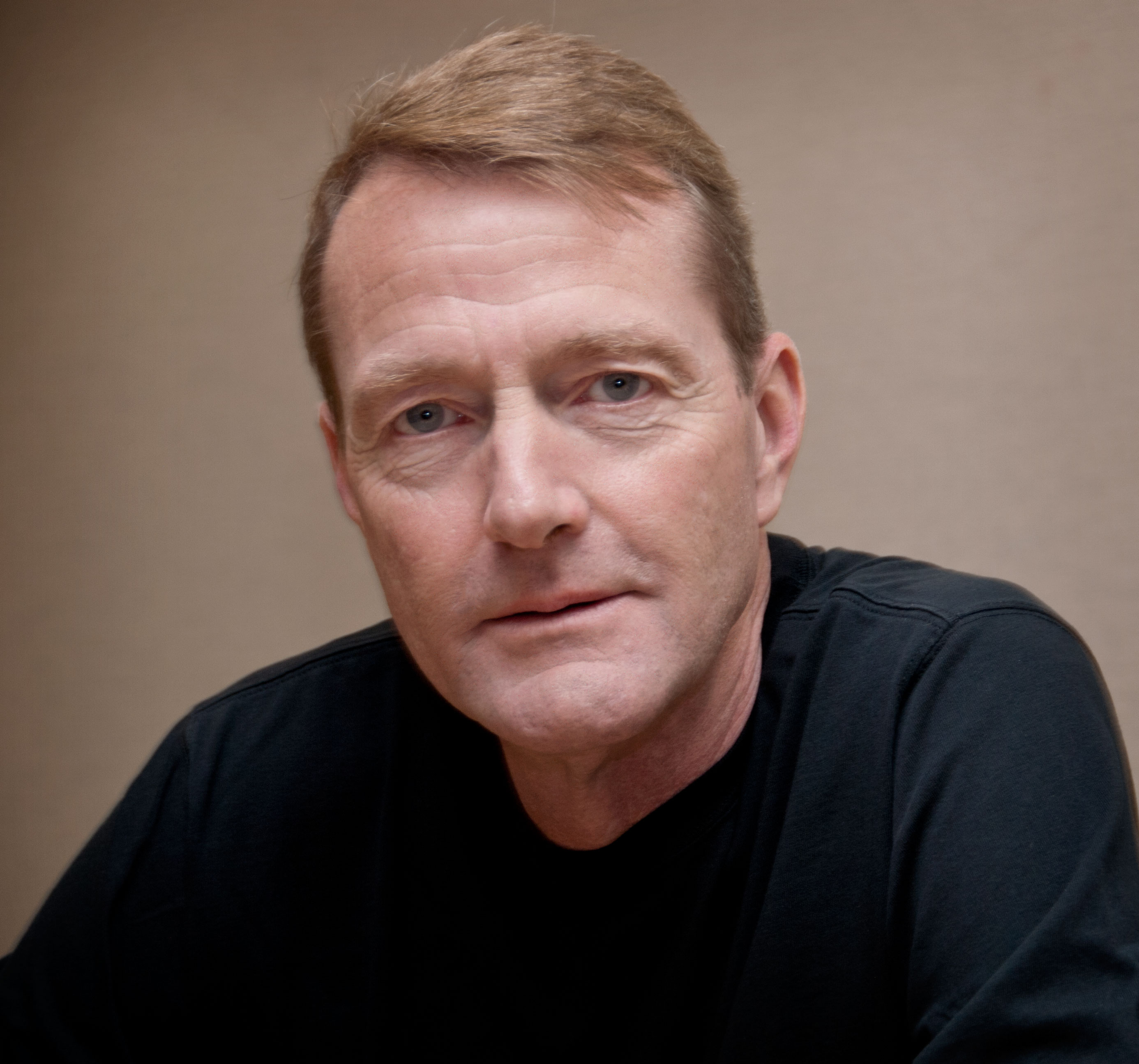
- Child at Bouchercon XLI, 2010
- Born: James Dover Grant; 29 October 1954 (age 72); Coventry, Warwickshire, England
- Education: King Edward's School, Birmingham; University of Sheffield (LLB)
- Occupation: Author
- Spouse: Jane Grant (m. 1975)
- Children: 1
- Relatives: Andrew Grant (brother)
- Writing career
- Period: 1985–present
- Genres: Crime fiction, mystery, thriller
- Notable work: Jack Reacher series of novels
- Lee Child's voice Recorded December 2013 from the BBC Radio 4 programme Bookclub

Signature
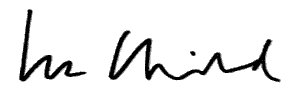

James Dover Grant CBE (born 29 October 1954), primarily known by his pen name Lee Child, is a British author who writes thriller novels and is best known for his Jack Reacher novel series. The books follow the adventures of a former American military policeman, Jack Reacher, who wanders the United States. His first novel, Killing Floor (1997), won the Anthony Award and the 1998 Barry Award for Best First Novel.

== Early life ==
James Dover Grant was born in Coventry, England. His Northern Irish Protestant father, who was born in Belfast, was a tax inspector at the Inland Revenue. His father fought in World War II; he was in the armoured column that arrived at Belsen to liberate the concentration camp in 1945. His mother began working at 19 at the Inland Revenue but had to leave her job when she married his father.

He is the second of four sons; his younger brother, Andrew Grant, is also a thriller novelist. He has an older brother called Richard who he described as a "nuclear scientist".

Grant's family moved to Handsworth Wood in Birmingham when he was four years old so that the boys could receive a better education. Grant attended Cherry Orchard Primary School in Handsworth Wood until the age of 11. He attended King Edward's School, Birmingham.

In 1974, at the age of 20, Grant studied law at the University of Sheffield, though he had no intention of entering the legal profession. During his student days, he worked backstage in a theatre. After graduating, he worked in commercial television. He received a Bachelor of Laws (LLB) degree from the University of Sheffield in 1977 and returned to the university to receive an honorary Doctor of Letters (DLitt) in 2009.

== Career ==
=== Television production career ===
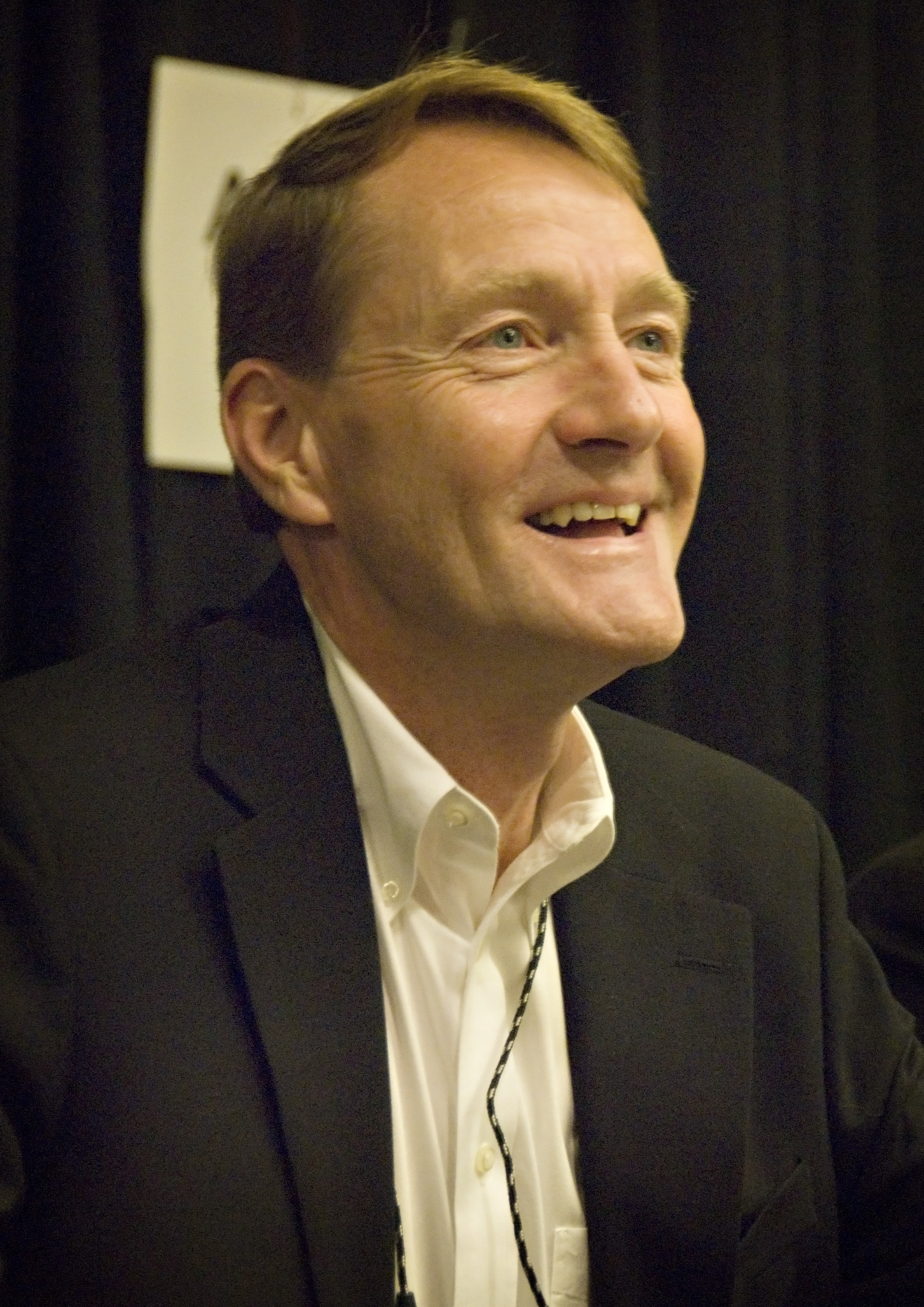
Grant at Bouchercon XL, 2009

Grant joined Granada Television, part of the UK's ITV Network, in Manchester as a presentation director. There he was involved with shows including Brideshead Revisited, The Jewel in the Crown, Prime Suspect, and Cracker. Grant was involved in the transmission of more than 40,000 hours of programmes for Granada, writing thousands of commercials and news stories. He worked at Granada from 1977 to 1995 and ended his career there with two years as a trade union shop steward.

=== Writing career ===
In August 1994, Grant was informed that his job was due to be eliminated in a corporate restructuring, and in anticipation of the coming job loss (he was made redundant in June 1995), he decided to start writing a novel in September 1994. The first book was initially titled Bad Luck and Trouble (this title was re-used in a later book) and was about drug money, but changed to Killing Floor and about counterfeiting on the suggestions of his agent and his publisher. In March 1997, Killing Floor was published, and became a great success. Grant moved to the United States in the summer of 1998. He starts each new book of the series on the anniversary of his starting the first book.

His pen name "Lee" comes from a mispronunciation of the name of Renault's Le Car, as "Lee Car". Calling anything "Lee" became a family gag. His daughter, Ruth, was "lee child". The name has the advantage of placing his books alphabetically on bookshop and library shelves between crime fiction greats Raymond Chandler and Agatha Christie.

Grant has said that he came up with the name Reacher for the central character in his novels when he was grocery shopping with his wife, Jane, at Asda supermarket in Kendal, Cumbria, when he was living at Kirkby Lonsdale. Grant is 6'3'' and his stature often leads to people asking him to get something for them from a high shelf. Jane once joked: "'Hey, if this writing thing doesn't pan out, you could always be a reacher in a supermarket.' ... 'I thought, Reacher—good name.'"

Some books in the Jack Reacher series are written in the first person, while others are written in the third person. Grant has characterised the books as revenge stories – "Somebody does a very bad thing, and Reacher takes revenge" – driven by his anger at the downsizing at Granada. Although English, he deliberately chose to write American-style thrillers. In 2007, Grant collaborated with 14 other writers to create the 17-part serial thriller The Chopin Manuscript, narrated by Alfred Molina. This was broadcast weekly on Audible.com between 25 September 2007 and 13 November 2007.

Grant worked as a visiting professor at the University of Sheffield from November 2008. In 2009, Grant funded 52 Jack Reacher scholarships for students at the university.

Grant was elected president of the Mystery Writers of America in 2009. Grant was the Programming Chair for the Theakstons Old Peculier Crime Writing Festival in 2018, part of the Harrogate International Festivals portfolio.

In 2019, it was announced Child would curate a new TV show called Lee Child: True Crime. The show would dramatise real-life crime stories from around the world and focus on average people who go to extraordinary lengths to fight crime or seek justice.

In January 2020, Grant announced that he would retire from writing the Jack Reacher series and hand it to his brother Andrew Grant, who would write further books of the series under the Child name. He intended to write the next few books with Grant before passing the series entirely over to him.

=== Writing style ===
Grant's prose has been described as "hardboiled" and "commercial" in style. In a 2012 interview, Grant said many aspects of the Jack Reacher novels were meant to maintain the books' profitability, rather than for literary reasons. For instance, Jack Reacher was given one French parent in part to increase the series' appeal in France. The interviewer wrote that Grant "didn't apologise about the commercial nature" of his fiction. He called novels the "purest form of entertainment."

Child has listed John D. MacDonald, Alistair MacLean, and Robert B. Parker as influences on the Reacher series.

=== Other activities ===
In 2019, Child collaborated with musicians Jennifer and Scott Smith of the group Naked Blue on an album of music exploring Jack Reacher, in song. He contributed vocals to the track "Reacher Said Nothing."

In 2020, Child joined the Booker Prize judging panel, alongside chair Margaret Busby, Sameer Rahim, Lemn Sissay, and Emily Wilson.

In December 2025, Child was a guest on BBC Radio 4's programme Desert Island Discs, with his favourite choice of music being "So What" by Miles Davis.

== Philanthropy ==
In January 2012, Grant donated £10,000 for a new vehicle for the Brecon Mountain Rescue Team in Wales.

Grant is an annual sponsor and original member of ThrillerFest.

== Personal life ==
Grant married his wife Jane in 1975. They have a daughter. They moved to New York State in 1998 at the beginning of his writing career. In 2025, he moved back to the UK with his family.

Grant is a fan of Aston Villa Football Club; his books sometimes include the names of Aston Villa players. In his 1997 first Jack Reacher novel Killing Floor, the name of mayor of Margrave, Grover Teale, is an oblique reference to Villa player Shaun Teale.

In 2013, Grant rejected claims initially reported in the Daily Mail that he wrote while under the influence of cannabis.

== Works ==
=== Novels ===
==== Reacher series ====
===== Jack Reacher series =====
Pub. order	Title	Year	ISBN	Perspective
1	Killing Floor	1997	0-593-04143-7	1st Person
2	Die Trying	1998	0-593-04144-5	3rd Person
3	Tripwire	1999	0-593-04393-6	3rd Person
4	The Visitor (UK), or Running Blind (US)	2000	0-593-04399-5	2nd/3rd Person
5	Echo Burning	2001	0-593-04659-5	3rd Person
6	Without Fail	2002	0-593-04686-2	3rd Person
7	Persuader	2003	0-593-04689-7	1st Person
8	The Enemy	2004	0-593-05182-3	1st Person
9	One Shot	2005	0-593-05183-1	3rd Person
10	The Hard Way	2006	978-0-593-05184-9	3rd Person
11	Bad Luck and Trouble	2007	978-0-593-05701-8	3rd Person
12	Nothing to Lose	2008	978-0-593-05702-5	3rd Person
13	Gone Tomorrow	2009	978-0-593-05705-6	1st Person
14	61 Hours	2010	978-0-593-05706-3	3rd Person
15	Worth Dying For	2010	978-0-593-06566-2	3rd Person
16	The Affair	2011	978-0-593-06570-9	1st Person
17	A Wanted Man	2012	978-0-593-06573-0	3rd Person
18	Never Go Back	2013	978-0-593-06574-7	3rd Person
19	Personal	2014	978-0-593-07382-7	1st Person
20	Make Me	2015	978-0-593-07388-9	3rd Person
21	Night School	2016	978-0-593-07390-2	3rd Person
22	The Midnight Line	2017	978-0-593-07818-1	3rd Person
23	Past Tense	2018	978-0-593-07819-8	3rd Person
24	Blue Moon	2019	978-1-78763-219-6	3rd Person
25^	The Sentinel	2020	978-1-78763-361-2	3rd Person
26^	Better Off Dead	2021	978-1-78763-373-5	1st Person
27^	No Plan B	2022	978-1-78763-375-9	3rd Person
28^	The Secret	2023	978-1-78763-377-3	3rd Person
29^	In Too Deep	2024	978-0-85750-559-0	3rd Person
30^	Exit Strategy	2025	978-0-85750-561-3	3rd Person
31^	Chain Reaction	2026	978-1-91175-424-4	3rd Person

Note: For consistency, ISBN is that of the Bantam Press (UK) hardcover, first printing only.
^ by Lee Child and Andrew Child

===== Frances Neagley series =====
Pub. order	Title	Year	ISBN	Perspective
1	Zero Margin	2027	978-1-91175-445-9	3rd Person

Note: For consistency, ISBN is that of the Bantam Press (UK) hardcover, first printing only.
^ by Lee Child and Yasmin Angoe

=== Non-fiction ===
- The Hero, Publication: London: TLS Books, 2019 ISBN 978-0-00-835578-4.

=== Short stories ===
Collections:

- No Middle Name (2017), collection of two novellas and ten short stories from the Jack Reacher series:
  "Too Much Time" (novella), "Deep Down", "Everyone Talks", "Guy Walks into a Bar", "High Heat" (novella), "James Penney's New Identity" (1999 version), "Maybe They Have a Tradition", "No Room at the Motel", "Not a Drill", "Second Son", "Small Wars", "The Picture of the Lonely Diner"
- Safe Enough (2024), collection of twenty short stories:
  "The Bodyguard", "The Greatest Trick of All", "Ten Keys", "Safe Enough", "Normal in Every Way", "The .50 Solution", "Public Transportation", "Me and Mr. Rafferty", "Section 7 (a) (Operational)", "Addicted to Sweetness", "The Bone-Headed League", "I Heard a Romantic Story", "My First Drug Trial", "Wet with Rain", "The Truth About What Happened", "Pierre, Lucien & Me", "New Blank Document", "Shorty and the Briefcase", "Dying for a Cigarette", "The Snake Eater by the Numbers"

Jack Reacher series:

Title	Year	Notes
"James Penney's New Identity"	1999, edited 2006	The 1999 version is longer. Collected in Fresh Blood 3 (edited by Mike Ripley and Maxim Jakubowski) and in Thriller (US)
"Guy Walks into a Bar"	2009	Prequel to novel Gone Tomorrow, in The New York Times
"Second Son"	2011	Electronic short story (August 2011)
"Knowing you're Alive"	2011	With M. J. Rose. Crossover with Butterfield Institute series. Collected in In Session
"Everyone Talks"	2012	In Esquire (June 2012, US edition)
"Deep Down"	2012	Electronic short story (July 2012)
"High Heat"	2013	Electronic novella (August 2013)
"Good and Valuable Consideration"	2014	With Joseph Finder. Crossover with Nick Heller series. Collected in Face Off (edited by David Baldacci, June 2014)
"Not a Drill"	2014	Electronic short story (July 2014)
"No Room at the Motel"	2014	In Stylist (December 2014)
"The Picture of the Lonely Diner"	2015	Collected in MWA Presents Manhattan Mayhem (June 2015)
"Small Wars"	2015	Electronic short story
"Maybe they Have a Tradition"	2016	In Country Life (December 2016)
"Too Much Time"	2017	Novella
"Faking a Murderer"	2017	With Kathy Reichs. Crossover with Temperance Brennan series. Collected in Matchup (June 2017)
"The Christmas Scorpion"	2017	In The Mail on Sunday (December 2017)
"The Fourth Man"	2018	Included in Australian paperback of Past Tense
"Cleaning the Gold"	2019	With Karin Slaughter. Crossover with Will Trent series (May 2019)
"Smile"	2019	Collected in Invisible Blood (July 2019)
"New Kid in Town"	2022	Collected in Hotel California (May 2022)
"Many Happy Returns"	2023	In The Spectator (December 2023)
"Over Easy"	2024	Included in Australian paperback of Safe Enough (August 2024)

Other short stories:

- "The Snake Eater by the Numbers", chapter six from the serialized novel Like a Charm (2004, edited by Karin Slaughter)
- "Ten Keys", collected in The Cocaine Chronicles (2005, edited by Jervey Tervalon and Gary Phillips)
- "The Greatest Trick of All", collected in Greatest Hits (2005, edited by Robert J. Randisi), and in The Best British Mysteries IV (2007)
- "Safe Enough", collected in MWA Presents Death Do Us Part (2006)
- "The .50 Solution", collected in Bloodlines: A Horse Racing Anthology (2006)
- Chapter 15 from audio serialized novel The Chopin Manuscript (2007)
- "Public Transportation", collected in Phoenix Noir (2009)
- One chapter from audio serialized novel The Copper Bracelet (2009)
- Story collected in The World's Greatest Crime Writers tell the inside Story of Their Great Detectives, or The Line Up (2010), about Jack Reacher and his origins
- "Me and Mr. Rafferty", collected in The Dark End of the Street (2010, edited by Jonathan Santlofer and S. J. Rozan)
- "Section 7 (a) (Operational)", collected in Agents of Treachery (2010)
- "The Bodyguard", collected in First Thrills (2010, edited by Lee Child)
- "Addicted to Sweetness", collected in MWA Presents The Rich and the Dead (2011, edited by Nelson DeMille)
- "The Bone-Headed League", collected in A Study in Sherlock (2011)
- "I Heard a Romantic Story", collected in Love is Murder (2012)
- "The Hollywood I Remember", collected in Vengeance (2012, edited by Lee Child)
- "My First Drug Trial", collected in The Marijuana Chronicles (July 2013)
- "Wet with Rain", collected in Belfast Noir (November 2014)
- "The Truth About What Happened", collected in In Sunlight or in Shadow: Stories Inspired by the Paintings of Edward Hopper (December 2016)
- "Chapter 6: The Fortune Cookie" from the novel Anatomy of Innocence (March 2017)
- "Pierre, Lucien & Me", collected in Alive in Shape and Color (December 2017)
- "New Blank Document", collected in It Occurs to Me that I am America (January 2018)
- "Shorty and the Briefcase", collected in Ten Year Stretch (April 2018)
- "Dying for a Cigarette", collected in The Nicotine Chronicles (2020)
- "Normal in Every Way", collected in Deadly Anniversaries (2020)

== Adaptations ==
- Jack Reacher (2012), film directed and written by Christopher McQuarrie, based on novel One Shot. An American thriller film starring Tom Cruise. Grant made a cameo appearance as a police desk sergeant in the film.
- Jack Reacher: Never Go Back (2016), film directed by Edward Zwick, and written by Richard Wenk, Zwick, and Marshall Herskovitz, based on the novel Never Go Back. With Tom Cruise reprising the role. In the film, the final scene is set in New Orleans, which was not a location in the book. Grant made a cameo appearance as an airport ticket agent in the film.
- Reacher (2022), an Amazon Prime series starring Alan Ritchson. In the last episode of season 1, Grant can be seen in the last chapter as a man walking out of the diner who says "Excuse me" when passing Reacher. Reacher then speaks to Finlay and eats a piece of peach pie.

== Awards ==
=== Awards of novels ===
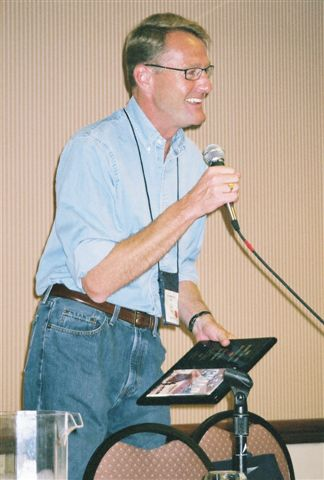
Child receiving a Barry Award in 2005 for The Enemy.

Novel title	Year	Awards/Nominations
Killing Floor	1997	Anthony Award; Barry Award; Japan Adventure Fiction Association Prize; Dilys Award nominee; Macavity Award nominee
Die Trying	1998	WH Smith Thumping Good Read Award
Without Fail	2002	Dilys Award nominee; Ian Fleming Steel Dagger Award nominee
Persuader	2003	Ian Fleming Steel Dagger Award nominee
The Enemy	2004	Barry Award; Nero Award; Dilys Award nominee
One Shot	2005	Macavity Award nominee
Bad Luck and Trouble	2007	Shortlisted for Theakston's Old Peculier Crime Novel of the Year Award, 2009
61 Hours	2010	Theakston's Old Peculier Crime Novel of the Year Award, 2011
A Wanted Man	2012	Specsavers' National Book Award, Thriller & Crime Novel of the Year
Personal	2014	RBA Prize for Crime Writing valued at €125,000

=== Honorary degrees ===
Child has received honorary degrees from several universities. These include:

Location	Date	School	Degree
England	2009	University of Sheffield	Doctor of Letters (DLitt)
England	21 July 2011	De Montfort University	Doctor of Letters (DLitt)
England	2023	Coventry University	Doctor of Letters (DLitt)

=== Other awards ===
Year	Award
2005	The Bob Kellogg Good Citizen Award for Outstanding Contribution to the Internet Writing Community
2013	Cartier Diamond Dagger, lifetime achievement by the Crime Writers' Association
2017	ThrillerMaster, lifetime achievement, by the International Thriller Writers association
2017	Outstanding Contribution to Crime Fiction, lifetime achievement, Theakston Old Peculier Crime Festival, Harrogate International Festivals
2019	Author of the Year, lifetime achievement, British Book Awards

== Honours ==
Grant was appointed Commander of the Order of the British Empire (CBE) in the 2019 Queen's Birthday Honours List for services to literature.
