= Andrew Grant (writer) =

British writer (born 1968)

- Born: 1968 (age 57–58); Birmingham, England
- Spouse: Tasha Alexander (m. 2010)
- Relatives: Lee Child (brother)
- Writing career
- Pen name: Andrew Child
- Language: English language
- Period: 2009–present
- Website: www.andrewgrantbooks.com

Andrew Grant (born 1968) is an English writer and the younger brother of bestselling thriller writer Lee Child. Grant is in the process of taking over the writing of Child's Jack Reacher series of thrillers, writing under the new pseudonym Andrew Child.

== Career ==
Grant wrote his first novel in 2008, Even, published in 2009, followed by two further novels, Die Twice and More Harm Than Good, all featuring David Trevellyan, a Royal Naval intelligence officer. Even received stars from both Library Journal and Publishers Weekly. He also wrote a book series featuring Cooper Devereaux, a detective in Birmingham, Alabama, starting with False Positive, released in 2015. This is followed by two books featuring Paul McGrath, starting with Invisible in 2019.

In January 2020, Grant's brother Lee Child announced that he intended to retire from writing the Jack Reacher book series, with Grant taking over. Child intended to write the next few books together with Grant before passing the series entirely over to him. Grant is writing under the pen name Andrew Child.

== Personal life ==
In 2010, Grant married novelist Tasha Alexander after meeting her in the crime fiction convention Bouchercon in Baltimore in 2008. They lived in Chicago for a number of years before moving to Tie Siding, Wyoming.

Grant is a supporter of Aston Villa. A number of his books feature characters with names borrowed from footballers who played for the club, including Paul McGrath.

== Bibliography ==
=== David Trevellyan series ===
- 1. Even – (2009)
- 2. Die Twice – (2010)
- 3. More Harm Than Good – (2012)

=== Detective Cooper Devereaux series ===
- 1. False Positive – (2015)
- 2. False Friend – (2017)
- 3. False Witness – (2018)

=== Paul McGrath series ===
- 1. Invisible – (2019)
- 2. Too Close to Home – (2020)

=== Jack Reacher series (as Andrew Child) ===
- 25. The Sentinel – (2020) (with Lee Child)
- 26. Better Off Dead – (2021) (with Lee Child)
- 27. No Plan B – (2022) (with Lee Child)
- 28. The Secret – (2023) (with Lee Child)
- 29. In Too Deep – (2024) (with Lee Child)
- 30. Exit Strategy – (2025) (with Lee Child)

=== Standalone novels ===
- 1. Run – (2014)
