= Bantam Press =

British publisher, part of Penguin Random House

- Parent company: Penguin Random House
- Country of origin: United Kingdom
- Headquarters location: London
- Publication types: Novels
- Official website: penguin.co.uk/bantam-press

Bantam Press is an imprint of Transworld Publishers, which is a British publishing division of Penguin Random House.

It is based on Uxbridge Road in Ealing near Ealing Broadway station, London, the same address as Transworld.

It releases hardcover and prestige softcover book editions. Bantam Press also publishes Sophie Kinsella's Shopaholic books.
