= Johnathan McClain =

American actor

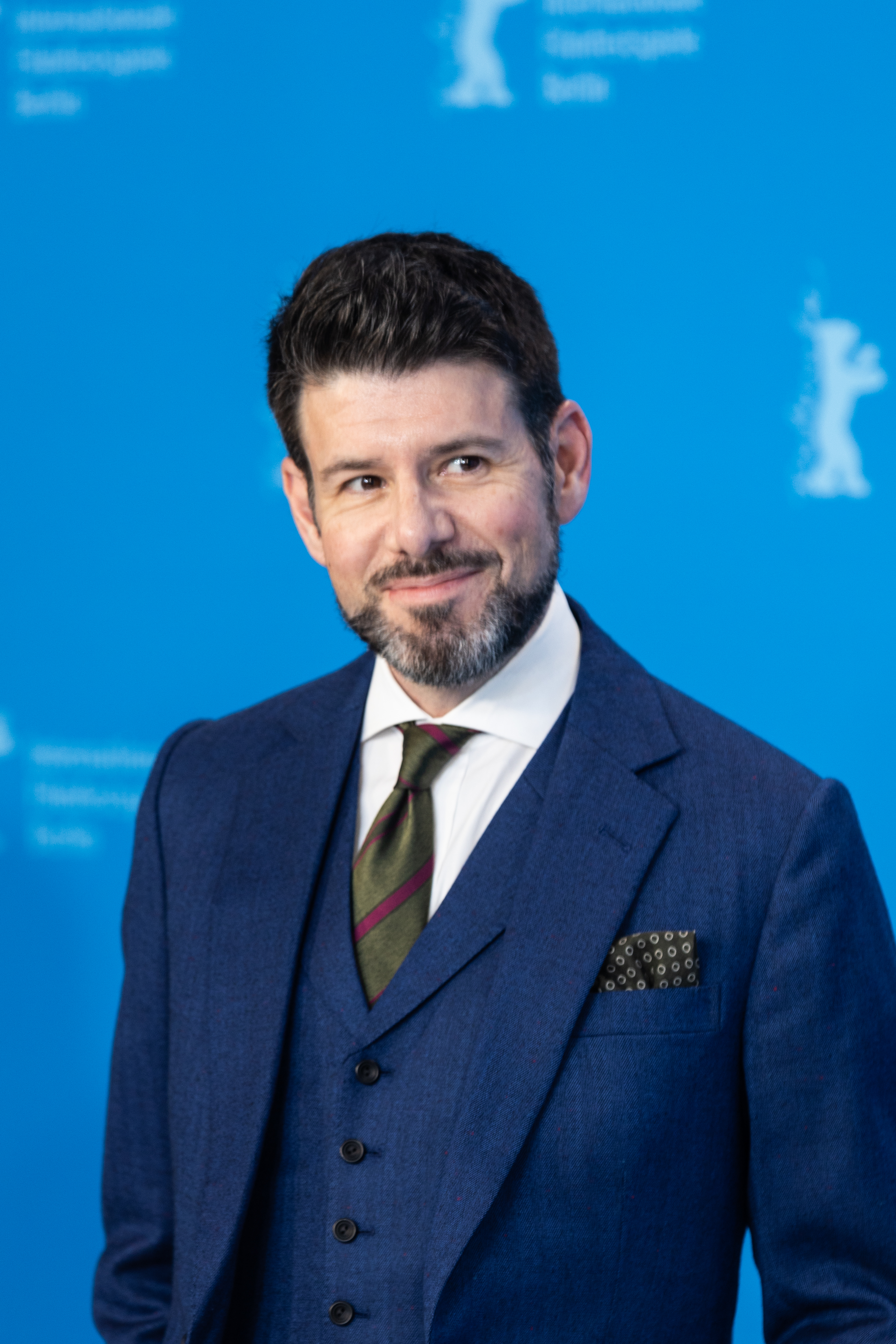
- Born: Myrtle Beach, South Carolina
- Occupations: Actor, writer
- Years active: 2001–present
- Spouse: Laura McClain

Johnathan McClain (born in Myrtle Beach, South Carolina) is an American actor, screenwriter, and audiobook narrator.

== Career ==
At the age of 21 McClain moved to Chicago where he wrote and began performing his critically acclaimed, multiple character, one-man show, "Like It Is." The Chicago Reader was quoted as saying: “If we’re ever to return to a day when theatre matters, we’ll need a few hundred more artists with McClain’s vision and courage.” The show subsequently moved to New York, where his work was compared to that of Eric Bogosian, John Leguizamo, and Anna Deavere Smith.

McClain continued to pursue stage acting for a number of years in New York City and his work there includes appearing Off-Broadway in the original cast of Jonathan Tolins’ "The Last Sunday In June" at The Rattlestick Playwrights Theater and later in its transfer to The Century Center for the Performing Arts, as well as at Lincoln Center Theater and with the Lincoln Center Director’s Lab. Around the country, he has been seen on stage at the American Conservatory Theater, South Coast Repertory, Florida Stage, Paper Mill Playhouse, and the National Jewish Theatre, as well as at various theatres in Los Angeles.

In 2004 he booked a lead in the Jessica Simpson pilot for ABC, and over the next several years made a number of guest appearances on television. In 2010 he was cast as the lead in TV Land's second original comedy series Retired at 35 which premiered on January 19, 2011, at 10:30 pm following Hot in Cleveland.

He has also worked as a contributor to the Public Radio International series Fair Game (radio).

== Personal life ==
McClain is originally from South Carolina. He and his wife, Laura, divide their time between New York and Los Angeles.

== Filmography ==
Year	Title	Role	Notes
2001	Law & Order: Special Victims Unit	Isaac Yarbrough	Episode: "Countdown"
2001	Sponk!	Host	
2002	Far from Heaven	Staff Member #1	
2003	Happy Family	Jimmy	Episode: "Randall's Gift"
2004	Jessica	Joe	TV Pilot
2005	The Bad Girl's Guide	Patric	Main Cast
2006	CSI: Miami	Todd Manning	Episode: "The Score"
2006	CSI: Crime Scene Investigation	Adam Chase	Episode: "Rashomama"
2007	Without a Trace	Justin Hobart	Episode: "One and Only"
2008	Valentine	Morgan Treat	Episode: "Daddy's Home"
2009	24	Derek Watts	Multiple Episodes
2009	Medium	Ted - Executive in Meeting	Episode "How To Make A Killing In Big Business Parts 1&2"
2010	Scoundrels	Hugh Barnes	Episode: "Liar, Liar, Pants on Fire"
2010	Love and Other Unstable States of Matter	Owen	
2011–12	Retired at 35	David Robbins	Lead
2012	The Glades	Zach Ferguson	Episode: "Longworth's Anatomy"
2014	Crash & Bernstein	Trent Bixby	Episode: "Flushed In Space"
2014	Mad Men	Alan Silver	Multiple Episodes
2016	Lab Rats: Elite Force	Tony	Episode: "Need for Speed"
2016	Bizaardvark	Liam	Multiple Episodes
2018	Prince of Peoria	King of Buronia	Multiple Episodes
2019	Mom	Mark	Episode: "Triple Dip and an Overhand Grip"
2022	The Outfit		Co-writer and Executive Producer

== Audiobook work ==
In 2012, New York Times bestselling author Lincoln Child's audiobook recording of The Third Gate was released for which Johnathan McClain was the narrator. AudioFile magazine reviewed it positively saying, "McClain enhances the narrative passages about the history of Egyptian royalty with deft pacing." Later that year, McClain continued his audiobook narrating with Christopher Krovatin's YA novel, Mountain of Bones: Gravediggers, Book 1, as well as three books from the Jack Reacher series by Lee Child: Die Trying, Tripwire, and Running Blind. His most recent narration project was Blake Crouch's novel, Famous, which is slated to be adapted into an A24 film starring Zac Efron.

Audiobooks
Year	Project	Author
2012	The Third Gate	Lincoln Child
2012	Mountain of Bones: Gravediggers, Book 1	Christopher Krovatin
2012	Die Trying	Lee Child
2012	Tripwire	Lee Child
2012	Running Blind	Lee Child
2013	These Broken Stars	Amie Kaufman, Meagan Spooner
2015	The Forgotten Room	Lincoln Child
2015	Illuminae	Jay Kristoff, Amie Kaufman
2016	The Last Days of Night	Graham Moore
2017	Infini	Krista & Becca Ritchie
2017	The Book Of Joe: The Life, Wit, And (Sometimes Accidental) Wisdom Of Joe Biden	Jeff Wilser
2019	The Mayor of Noobtown	Ryan Rimmel
2019	The Village of Noobtown	Ryan Rimmel
2020	Castle of the Noobs	Ryan Rimmel
2020	Dungeons and Noobs	Ryan Rimmel
2021	Noob Game Plus	Ryan Rimmel
2022	Nautical Noobs	Ryan Rimmel
2023	Tower of the Noobs	Ryan Rimmel
2024	I Ran Away to Evil	Mystic Neptune
2024	Ultimate Level 1	Shawn Wilson
2024	Bog Standard Isekai: Scarred	Miles English
2024	Bog Standard Isekai: Illusionist	Miles English
2025	Famous	Blake Crouch
2025	Bog Standard Isekai: Nightmares	Miles English
2026	Bog Standard Isekai: Benighted	Miles English
2026	Arcane Chef	T.J. Ward
2026	Arcane Chef 2	T.J. Ward
