= 34th Young Artist Awards =

2013 US media awards ceremony

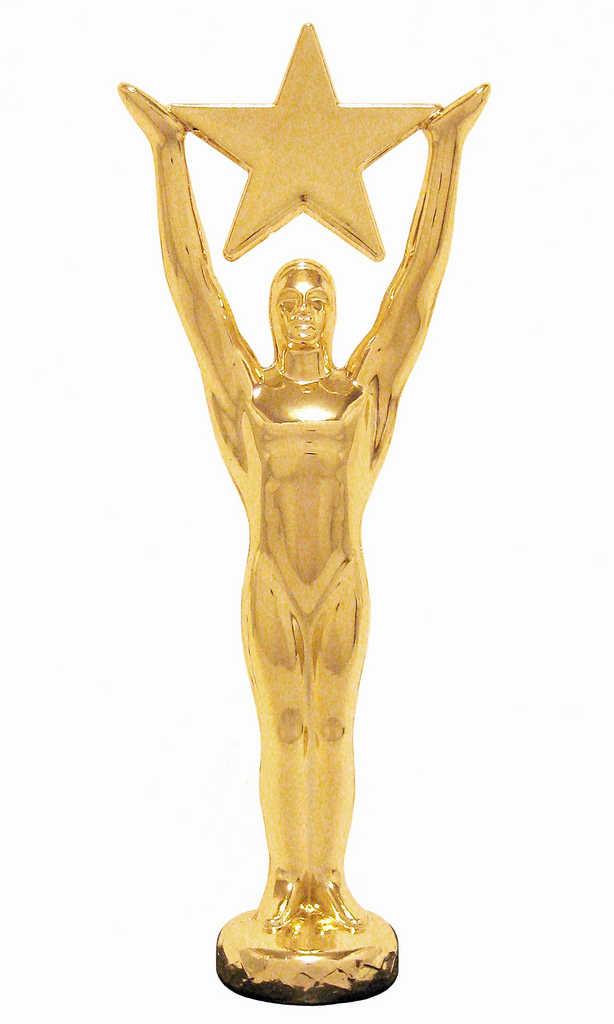
- Awarded for: Achievement in 2012 in film and television
- Date: May 5, 2013
- Site: Sportsmen's Lodge; Studio City, California
- Hosted by: Bella Thorne, Max Charles and Zendaya

The 34th Young Artist Awards ceremony, presented by the Young Artist Association, honored excellence of young performers between the ages of 5 and 21 in the fields of film, television and theatre for the 2012 calendar year. The 34th annual ceremony also marked the first year the association recognized achievements of young internet performers with the inaugural presentation of the award for "Best Web Performance".

Nominees were announced on Sunday March 31, 2013, and subsequent voting was undertaken by former Youth in Film Award/Young Artist Award winners, from 1979 to 2011. Winners were announced on Sunday, May 5, 2013, at the annual ceremony and banquet luncheon in the Empire Ballroom of the Sportsmen's Lodge in Studio City, California.

Live musical entertainment at the ceremony included Indiana based country pop group Jetset Getset and Los Angeles based vocalist Agina Alvarez. Following the death of Young Artist Association president and founder, Maureen Dragone on February 8, 2013, it was announced that the 34th Annual ceremony would also feature a memorial tribute in her honor.

Established in 1978 by long-standing Hollywood Foreign Press Association member, Maureen Dragone, the Young Artist Association was the first organization to establish an awards ceremony specifically set to recognize and award the contributions of performers under the age of 21 in the fields of film, television, theater and music.

== Categories ==
★ Bold indicates the winner in each category.

== Best Performance in a Feature Film ==
=== Best Performance in a Feature Film – Leading Young Actor ===
★ Tom Holland – The Impossible – Warner Brothers

- Jared Gilman – Moonrise Kingdom – Focus Features
- Zachary Gordon – Diary of a Wimpy Kid: Dog Days – Fox 2000
- Quinn Lord – Imaginaerum – Nordisk Films
- Jason Spevack – Jesus Henry Christ – Entertainment One
- Christian Traeumer – The Child – Stealth Media Group

=== Best Performance in a Feature Film – Leading Young Actress ===
★ (tie) Kathryn Newton – Paranormal Activity 4 – Paramount Pictures
★ (tie) Quvenzhané Wallis – Beasts of the Southern Wild – Fox Searchlight Pictures

- Tara Lynne Barr – God Bless America – Magnolia Pictures
- Kara Hayward – Moonrise Kingdom – Focus Features

=== Best Performance in a Feature Film – Young Actor Ten and Under ===
★ CJ Adams – The Odd Life of Timothy Green – Walt Disney Pictures

- Chandler Canterbury – A Bag of Hammers – MPI
- Riley Thomas Stewart – The Lucky One – Warner Brothers

=== Best Performance in a Feature Film – Supporting Young Actor ===
★ (tie) Robert Capron – Diary of a Wimpy Kid: Dog Days – Fox 2000
★ (tie) Austin MacDonald – Jesus Henry Christ – Entertainment One

- Karan Brar – Diary of a Wimpy Kid: Dog Days – Fox 2000
- Zach Callison – Rock Jocks – Intelligent Life Media
- Alex Ferris – In Their Skin – IFC Films
- Daniel Huttlestone – Les Miserables – Universal Pictures
- Samuel Joslin – The Impossible – Warner Brothers
- Gulliver McGrath – Dark Shadows – Warner Brothers

=== Best Performance in a Feature Film – Supporting Young Actress ===
★ Savannah Lathem – California Solo – Cherry Sky Films

- Maude Apatow – This Is 40 – Universal Pictures
- Mackenzie Foy – The Twilight Saga: Breaking Dawn – Part 2 – Summit Entertainment
- Joey King – The Dark Knight Rises – Warner Brothers
- Laine MacNeil – Diary of a Wimpy Kid: Dog Days – Fox 2000
- Odeya Rush – The Odd Life of Timothy Green – Walt Disney Pictures

=== Best Performance in a Feature Film – Supporting Young Actor Ten and Under ===
★ Sebastian Banes – In the Family – In The Family Productions

- Kyle Harrison Breitkopf – Parental Guidance – 20th Century Fox
- Cameron M. Brown – Abraham Lincoln: Vampire Hunter – 20th Century Fox
- Connor & Owen Fielding – Diary of a Wimpy Kid: Dog Days – Fox 2000
- Pierce Gagnon – Looper – Sony Pictures
- Joseph Paul Kennedy – Nature Calls – Magnet Releasing
- Oaklee Pendergast – The Impossible – Warner Brothers
- John Paul Ruttan – This Means War – 20th Century Fox
- Joshua Rush – Parental Guidance – 20th Century Fox

=== Best Performance in a Feature Film – Supporting Young Actress Ten and Under ===
★ Isabelle Allen – Les Miserables – Universal Pictures

- Dalila Bela – Diary of a Wimpy Kid: Dog Days – Fox 2000
- Lexi Cowan – Promised Land – Focus Features
- Raevan Lee Hanan – Cloud Atlas – Warner Brothers
- Emma Rayne Lyle – Why Stop Now – BCDF Pictures

=== Best Performance in a Feature Film – Young Ensemble Cast ===
★ Diary of a Wimpy Kid: Dog Days – Fox 2000

Zachary Gordon, Robert Capron, Peyton List, Karan Brar, Laine MacNeil, Connor & Owen Fielding, Devon Bostick, Grayson Russell

- Parental Guidance – 20th Century Fox

Bailee Madison, Joshua Rush, Kyle Harrison Breitkopf

== Best Performance in an International Feature Film ==
=== Best Performance in an International Feature Film – Young Actor ===
★ Antoine Olivier Pilon – Les Pee-Wee 3D – Canada

- Mahmoud Asfa – When I Saw You ( لما شفتك ) – Palestine
- Teo Gutierrez Romero – Infancia Clandestina (Clandestine Childhood) – Argentina
- Rick Lens – Kauwboy (Jackdaw Boy) – Netherlands
- Emilien Neron – Monsieur Lazhar (Mister Lazhar) – Canada

=== Best Performance in an International Feature Film – Young Actress ===
★ Alice Morel-Michaud – Les Pee-Wee 3D – Canada

- Fátima Buntinx – Las Malas Intenciones (The Bad Intentions) – Peru
- Tessa la González – Después de Lucía (After Lucia) – Mexico
- Sophie Nélisse – Monsieur Lazhar (Mister Lazhar) – Canada

== Best Performance in a Short Film ==
=== Best Performance in a Short Film – Young Actor ===
★ Connor Beardmore – When I Grow Up, I Want To Be A Dinosaur – Capilano University

- Dakota Bales – A.B.S. – Phish Tank Philms
- Joshua Bales – A.B.S. – Phish Tank Philms
- Mark D'Sol – A.B.S. – Phish Tank Philms
- Jonathon Tyler Ford – No Hitter – Independent
- Andy Scott Harris – The Stone on the Shore – Chapman University
- Joey Luthman – Tough Guy – Powder Films
- Caon Mortenson – A.B.S. – Phish Tank Philms
- Matthew Nardozzi – May – Independent
- Brandon Tyler Russell – Transcendence – Shipman Media

=== Best Performance in a Short Film – Young Actress ===
★ Jolie Vanier – Hello, My Name is Abigail – BFA Film Productions

- Brighid Fleming – A.B.S. – Phish Tank Philms
- Carol Huska – Breaking Over Me – York University
- Leeah D. Jackson – A Mother's Choice: The Ultimatum – Star Trac Productions
- Chanel Marriott – Bombay Beach – Screen Australia
- Brea Renee – A Mother's Choice: The Ultimatum – Star Trac Productions
- Kiana Lyz Rivera – The Supplement – Cat Eye Productions
- Courtney Robinson – A.B.S. – Phish Tank Philms
- Jordan Van Vranken – Detention – Independent

=== Best Performance in a Short Film – Young Actor 11 and 12 ===
★ (tie) Dawson Dunbar – A Strange Day in July – Independent
★ (tie) Christian Traeumer – Bolero – Wildflower Films

- Brady Bryson – Under the Big Top – Independent
- Samuel Caruana – Kickstart Theft – BandPro Films
- Joshua Costea – Lucid – Team Jugular Knott
- Josh Feldman – The Sleepover – Independent
- Tanner Saunders – Say Lovey – Capilano University
- Tai Urban – Hiding Game – Urban Media Group

=== Best Performance in a Short Film – Young Actress 11 and 12 ===
★ Paris Smith – Scouted – Independent

- Ava Allan – Billie Speare – Tramline Entertainment
- Jade Aspros – Life Doesn't Frighten Me – LDFM Films
- Tara-Nicole Azarian – ROTFL – Front Porch Films
- Laci Kay – Olivia – Colirio Films
- Ashley Lonardo – Clear Revenge – Lonardo Productions
- Elise Luthman – More Than Words – AFI
- Ashley Lynn Switzer – Handbag – Barefoot Girl Productions

=== Best Performance in a Short Film – Young Actor Ten and Under ===
★ Nicolas Neve – A Sunflower – TASA Productions

- Alexander Almaguer – The Best Man – Columbia College Chicago
- Peter Bundic – Man of the House – Independent
- Richard Davis – The Comeback Kid – Ryerson Short
- Jack Fulton – Night Light – CFC
- Edward Sass III – The Cure – Densely Hollow Films

=== Best Performance in a Short Film – Young Actress Ten and Under ===
★ (tie) Katelyn Mager – When I Grow Up, I Want To Be A Dinosaur – Capilano University
★ (tie) Hannah Swain – Geronimo – APASI Productions

- Eliana Calogiros – By My Side – Blackspear Productions
- Genea Charpentier – The Old Woman in the Woods – Independent
- Megan Charpentier – The Old Woman in the Woods – Independent
- Kaitlin Cheung – Frank – Capilano University
- Maia Costea – Maia – Kinoeye Productions
- Bianca D'Ambrosio – Voodoo the Right Thing – Mansfield Productions
- Chiara D'Ambrosio – Voodoo the Right Thing – Mansfield Productions
- Jada Facer – Nina Del Tango – Lens Flare Films
- Eliza Faria – A Strange Day in July – Independent
- Bridget Jeske – Rumpelstiltskin – Celluloid Social Club
- Peyton Kennedy – The Offering – CFC Productions
- Ariyena Koh – Little Mao – CAA Media
- Veronica McFarlane – Nobody's Victim- AFI
- Savannah McReynolds – Transcendence – Shipman Media
- Alisha Newton – No Place Like Home – Independent
- Alisha-Jo Penney – Like Smoke – Sakaria Film
- Marlowe Peyton – How To Get To Candybar – White Eagle Productions

== Best Performance in a TV Movie, Miniseries, Special or Pilot ==
=== Best Performance in a TV Movie, Miniseries, Special or Pilot – Leading Young Actor ===
★ (tie) Josh Feldman – Santa Paws 2: The Santa Pups – Disney
★ (tie) Sean Michael Kyer – Anything But Christmas – ION Television

- Tucker Albrizzi – Shmagreggie Saves the World – Disney XD
- Dylan Everett – Frenemies – Disney Channel
- Trevor Jackson – Let It Shine – Disney Channel
- Joey Luthman – The Joey and Elise Show – DATV

=== Best Performance in a TV Movie, Miniseries, Special or Pilot – Leading Young Actress ===
★ Kyla Kennedy – Raising Izzie – GMC-TV

- Leah Lewis – Fred 3: Camp Fred – Nickelodeon
- Elise Luthman – The Joey and Elise Show – DATV
- Bella Thorne – Frenemies – Disney Channel
- Zendaya – Frenemies – Disney Channel

=== Best Performance in a TV Movie, Miniseries, Special or Pilot – Supporting Young Actor ===
★ Valin Shinyei – Christmas Miracle – Vivendi Entertainment

- Emjay Anthony – Applebaum – CBS
- Darien Provost – The Christmas Consultant – Lifetime

=== Best Performance in a TV Movie, Miniseries, Special or Pilot – Supporting Young Actress ===
★ Eliza Faria – The Christmas Consultant – Lifetime

- Ella Ballentine – Baby's 1st Christmas – Hallmark
- Dalila Bela – A Fairly Odd Christmas – Nickelodeon
- Olivia Steele Falconer – A Fairly Odd Christmas – Nickelodeon
- Danielle Parker – The Seven Year Hitch – Hallmark
- Marlowe Peyton – Applebaum – CBS
- Bobbie Prewitt – Animal Practice – NBC
- Rowan Rycroft – Duke – Hallmark
- Siobhan Williams – Christmas Miracle – Vivendi Entertainment

== Best Performance in a TV Series ==
=== Best Performance in a TV Series – Leading Young Actor ===
★ Blake Michael – Dog with a Blog – Disney Channel

- Jared Gilmore – Once Upon a Time – ABC
- Patrick Johnson – Necessary Roughness – USA Network
- David Mazouz – Touch – FOX
- Chandler Riggs – The Walking Dead – AMC

=== Best Performance in a TV Series – Leading Young Actress ===
★ (tie) Savannah Paige Rae – Parenthood – NBC
★ (tie) Torri Webster – Life with Boys – Nickelodeon

- Layla Crawford – The First Family – Entertainment Studios
- Christine Prosperi – Degrassi: The Next Generation – CTV
- Olivia Scriven – Degrassi: The Next Generation – CTV
- Victory Van Tuyl -Marvin Marvin – Nickelodeon

=== Best Performance in a TV Series – Supporting Young Actor ===
★ Tyree Brown – Parenthood – NBC

- Karan Brar – Jessie – Disney Channel
- Max Charles – The Neighbors – ABC
- Seth Isaac Johnson – The Killing – AMC
- Maxim Knight – Falling Skies – TNT
- Austin MacDonald – Debra! – Family Channel
- Ian Patrick – The Neighbors – ABC
- Isaac Hempstead Wright – Game of Thrones – HBO

=== Best Performance in a TV Series – Supporting Young Actress ===
★ Alisha Newton – Heartland – CBC

- Taylor Blackwell – Magic City – Starz Network
- Isabella Cramp – The Neighbors – ABC
- Madison Lintz – The Walking Dead – AMC
- Sophie Turner – Game of Thrones – HBO
- Maisie Williams – Game of Thrones – HBO

=== Best Performance in a TV Series – Guest Starring Young Actor 14–21 ===
★ (tie) Shak Ghacha – Touch – FOX
★ (tie) Joey Luthman – Kickin' It – Disney XD

- Connor Beardmore – Fringe – Warner Brothers
- LJ Benet – Bones – FOX
- Harrison Thomas Boxley – Kickin' It – Disney XD
- Michael Chey – New Girl – FOX
- Donnie MacNeil – R.L. Stine's The Haunting Hour – The Hub Network
- Daniel Polo – Touch – FOX

=== Best Performance in a TV Series – Guest Starring Young Actress 17–21 ===
★ Erin Sanders – Fresh Beat Band – Nick Jr.

- Katlin Mastandrea – Anger Management – FX
- Jennifer Veal – Victorious – Nickelodeon

=== Best Performance in a TV Series – Guest Starring Young Actress 14–16 ===
★ Isabella Palmieri – Good Luck Charlie – Disney Channel

- Jaylen Barron – Bones – FOX
- Chelsey Bryson – The Secret Life of the American Teenager – ABC Family Channel
- Sadie Calvano – Kickin' It – Disney XD
- Madison Curtis – Kickin' It – Disney XD
- Laine MacNeil – Falling Skies – TNT

=== Best Performance in a TV Series – Guest Starring Young Actor 11–13 ===
★ Mateus Ward – Weeds – Showtime

- Brady Bryson – Celebrity Ghost Stories – Biography Channel
- Parker Contreras – Victorious – Nickelodeon
- Lucky Davis – Southland – Turner Network
- Joe D'Giovanni – Victorious – Nickelodeon
- Jake Elliot – 2 Broke Girls – CBS
- Gregory Kasyan – Hawaii Five-0 – CBS
- Quinn Lord – Once Upon a Time – ABC
- Robbie Tucker – Awkward – MTV

=== Best Performance in a TV Series – Guest Starring Young Actress 11–13 ===
★ Annika Horne – Army Wives – Lifetime

- Taylor Blackwell – Army Wives – Lifetime
- Mandalynn Carlson – CSI: New York – CBS
- Hannah Eisenmann – Criminal Minds – CBS
- Olivia Steele Falconer – Falling Skies – TNT
- Brighid Fleming – Awake – NBC
- Bella King – Leverage – TNT
- Madison Leisle – Stevie TV – VH1
- Kiernan Shipka – Don't Trust the B— in Apartment 23 – ABC

=== Best Performance in a TV Series – Guest Starring Young Actor Ten and Under ===
★ Bruce Salomon – Emily Owens, M.D. – CW Network

- Thomas Barbusca – The New Normal – NBC
- Jet Jurgensmeyer – Austin & Ally – Disney Channel

=== Best Performance in a TV Series – Guest Starring Young Actress Ten and Under ===
★ Charlotte White – Private Practice – ABC

- Ella Anderson – A.N.T. Farm – Disney Channel
- Melody Angel – How to Rock – Nickelodeon
- Sage Boatright – Victorious – Nickelodeon
- Caitlin Carmichael – Retired at 35 – TV Land
- Namaiya Cunningham – Lazytown Super Sproutlet – PBS
- Giana Gomez – Good Luck Charlie – Disney Channel
- Kyla Kennedy – The New Normal – NBC
- Rylan Lee – Victorious – Nickelodeon
- Emma Rayne Lyle – Law and Order: Special Victims Unit – NBC
- Danielle Parker – Don't Trust the B— in Apartment 23 – ABC
- Alissa Skobye – R.L. Stine's The Haunting Hour – The Hub Network

=== Best Performance in a TV Series – Recurring Young Actor 17–21 ===
★ Brock Ciarlelli – The Middle – ABC

- Austin MacDonald – Life with Boys – Nickelodeon
- RJ Mitte – Breaking Bad – AMC
- Lyle O'Donohoe – Degrassi: The Next Generation – CTV
- Mikey Reid – Victorious – Nickelodeon

=== Best Performance in a TV Series – Recurring Young Actress 17–21 ===
★ Frederique Dufort – Unité 9 – Radio Canada (TV)

- Katlin Mastandrea – The Middle – ABC
- Erin Sanders – Big Time Rush – Nickelodeon

=== Best Performance in a TV Series – Recurring Young Actor ===
★ Martin Holden Weiner – Mad Men – AMC

- Trevor Jackson – Eureka – NBC
- Nicky Korba – Shameless – Showtime
- Robert Naylor – Being Human – SyFy
- Brandon Soo Hoo – Supah Ninjas – Nickelodeon

=== Best Performance in a TV Series – Recurring Young Actress ===
★ (tie) Addison Holley – My Babysitter's a Vampire – Disney Channel
★ (tie) Kiernan Shipka – Mad Men – AMC

- Jaylen Barron – See Dad Run – Nickelodeon
- Lucy and Josie Gallina – Boardwalk Empire – HBO
- Kayla Maisonet – Dog with a Blog – Disney Channel
- Lauren Dair Owens – New Girl – FOX

=== Best Performance in a TV Series – Recurring Young Actor Ten and Under ===
★ Rory and Declan McTigue – Boardwalk Empire – HBO

- Tyler Champagne – The Client List – Lifetime
- Stone Eisenmann – New Girl – FOX

=== Best Performance in a Daytime TV Series – Young Actor ===
★ Daniel Polo – The Young and the Restless – CBS

- Andrew Trischitta – One Life to Live – ABC
- Terrell Ransom, Jr – Days of Our Lives – NBC

=== Best Performance in a Daytime TV Series – Young Actress ===
★ Samantha Bailey – The Young and the Restless – CBS

- Haley King – The Young and the Restless – CBS
- Haley Pullos – General Hospital – ABC

=== Best Performance in a Daytime TV Series – Young Actress Ten and Under ===
★ Brooklyn Rae Silzer – General Hospital – ABC

- Cheyanna Prelesnik – General Hospital – ABC
- Campbell Rose – Days of Our Lives – NBC

=== Outstanding Young Ensemble in a TV Series ===
★ The Neighbors – ABC

Max Charles, Isabella Cramp, Ian Patrick

- Incredible Crew – Cartoon Network

Shauna Case, Shameik Moore, Tristan Pasterick, Chanelle Peloso, Jeremy Shada, Brandon Soo Hoo

== Best Performance in a Voice-Over Role ==
=== Best Performance in a Voice-Over Role (Feature Film) – Young Actor ===
★ Charlie Tahan – Frankenweenie – Walt Disney Pictures

- Tucker Albrizzi – Paranorman – Focus Features
- Kodi Smit-McPhee – Paranorman – Focus Features

=== Best Performance in a Voice-Over Role (Television) – Young Actor ===
★ (tie) Zach Callison – Sofia the First: Once Upon a Princess – Walt Disney Pictures
★ (tie) Jake Sim – The Magic Hockey Skates – Amberwood Entertainment

- Jacob Ewaniuk – The Cat in the Hat Knows a Lot About That! – PBS
- Graeme Jokic – Franklin and Friends – Nelvana
- Jet Jurgensmeyer – Special Agent Oso – Disney Channel
- Regan Mizrahi – Dora the Explorer – Nickelodeon
- Mark Ramsey – Franklin and Friends – Nelvana

=== Best Performance in a Voice-Over Role (Television) – Young Actress ===
★ Caitlin Carmichael – Doc McStuffins – Disney Channel

- Addison Holley – Daniel Tiger's Neighborhood – PBS
- Nissae Isen – Mike the Knight – Nelvana
- Ashleigh Midanik – The 99 – EWD
- Kiernan Shipka – The Legend of Korra – Nickelodeon
- Alexa Torrington – The Cat in the Hat Knows a Lot About That! – PBS

== Best Performance in a DVD Film ==
=== Best Performance in a DVD Film – Young Actor ===
★ (tie) Ryan Hartwig – The Aggression Scale – Anchor Bay Entertainment
★ (tie) Brandon Tyler Russell – Smitty – Tri Coast Studios

- David Chandler – FDR American Badass – Screen Media Films
- Zach Louis – Golden Winter – The Asylum
- Valin Shinyei – A Christmas Story 2 – Warner Brothers
- Austin Wolff – Golden Winter – The Asylum

=== Best Performance in a DVD Film – Young Actress ===
★ Jordan Van Vranken – After the Wizard – Breaking Glass Pictures

- Caitlin Carmichael – The Dog Who Saved the Holidays – Starz Home Entertainment
- Layla Crawford – Note to Self – BET/Viacom
- Cassidy Mack – Chilly Christmas – Anchor Bay Entertainment
- Siobhan Williams – Flicka: Country Pride – 20th Century Fox Home Ent.

== Best Web Performance ==
=== Best Web Performance – Young Actor ===
★ Luke Broyles – Up in Arms – Wild Monkey Productions

- Alex Dale – Up in Arms – Wild Monkey Productions
- Dawson Dunbar – Written By a Kid – Geek and Sundry
- Garret Palmer – Up in Arms – Wild Monkey Productions
- Michael Pena – Teens Wanna Know – Pena Talent and Productions
- Nathaniel Pena – Teens Wanna Know – Pena Talent and Productions
- Ivan Quijano – Up in Arms – Wild Monkey Productions
- Ethan Singal – Drugs Not 4 Me – Team Seven Entertainment

=== Best Web Performance – Young Actress ===
★ Ariel Fournier – Beyond the Spotlight – Talent GPS

- Camden Angelis – Totally Amp'd – Shaftesbury Films
- Madison Curtis – Up in Arms – Wild Monkey Productions
- Victoria Grace – Up in Arms – Wild Monkey Productions
- Emily Jordan – Up in Arms – Wild Monkey Productions
- Brandi Alyssa Young – The Dark One – Insidious Set Productions

== Best Performance in Live Theater ==
=== Best Performance in Live Theater – Young Actor ===
★ Matthew Nardozzi – Lyle the Crocodile – Orlando Repertory Theatre, Florida (now Orlando Family Stage)

- L.J. Benet – Waiting for Godot – Mark Taper Forum, California
- Sean Eaton – The Square Root of Wonderful – The Raven Playhouse, California
- Lewis Grosso – Newsies – Nederlander Theatre, New York
- Aidan Wessels – The Music Man – Theatre Under the Stars, Vancouver
- Jordan Wessels – All the Way Home – Electric Company Theatre, Vancouver

=== Best Performance in Live Theater – Young Actress ===
★ Camden Angelis – Mary Poppins – Cadillac Theatre, Chicago

- Ella Ballentine – Numbers – Factory Theatre, Toronto
- Brielle Barbusca – Other People's Organs – The Blank Theatre, California
- Sydney Rose – Dr. Seuss' How the Grinch Stole Christmas! The Musical – The Old Globe Theatre, California
- Jolie Vanier – Charlie and the Chocolate Factory – Hudson Theatre, California

== Special awards ==
=== Mickey Rooney Former Child Star Award ===
★ Melissa Joan Hart – Clarissa Darling in the Nickelodeon series Clarissa Explains It All and Sabrina Spellman in ABC's Sabrina, the Teenage Witch

=== Jackie Coogan Award ===
==== Contribution to Youth Through Entertainment ====
★ Barbara Gasser, Journalist – "Rote Nasen" ("Clown Doctors")

=== Social Relations of Knowledge Institute Award ===
★ Nova: Hunting the Elements with David Pogue – PBS
