= Emma Rayne Lyle =

American actress

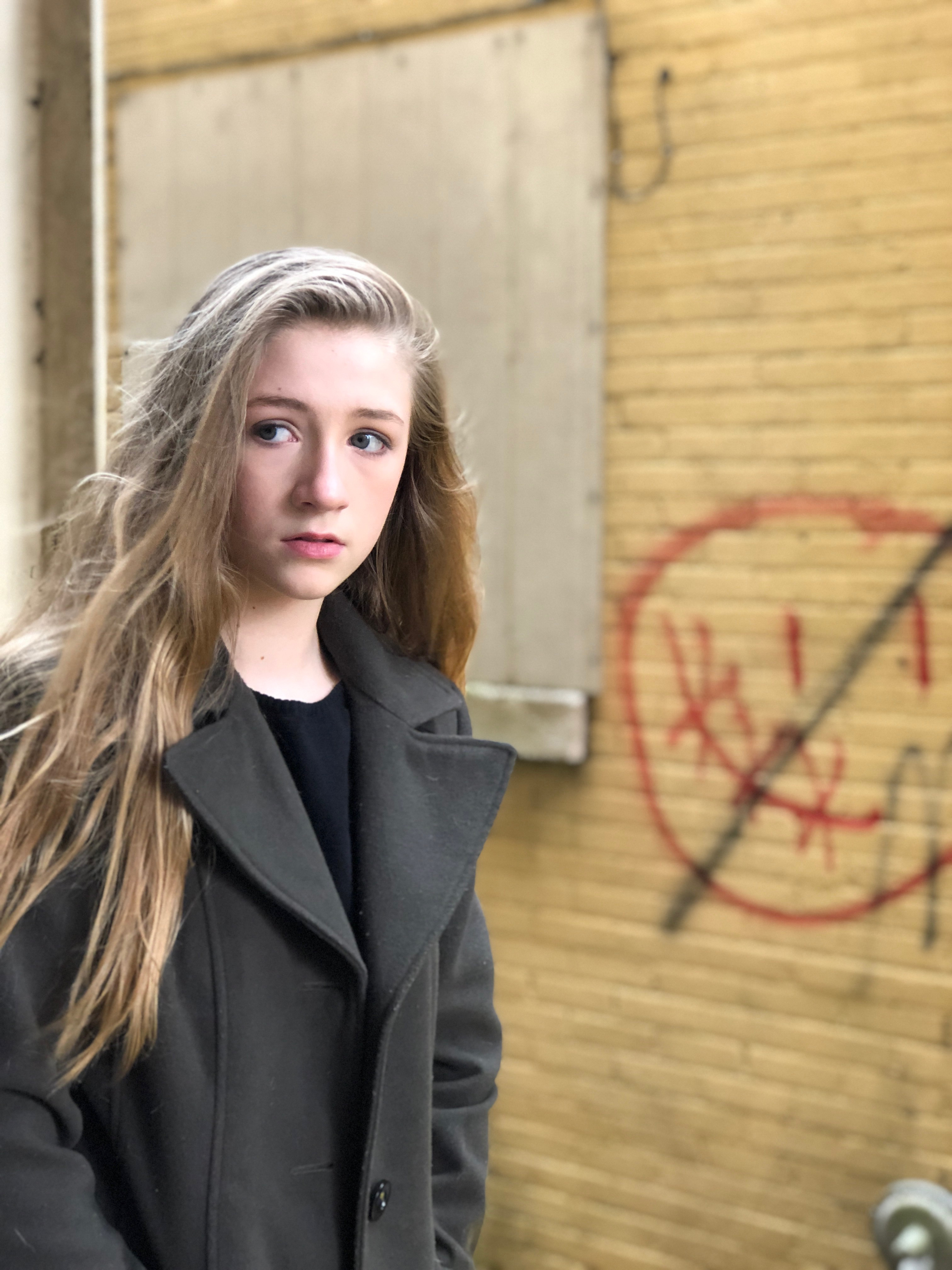
- Occupation: Actress
- Years active: 2010–present

Emma Rayne Lyle is an American actress best known for her role as Emily Reddy in the feature film I Don't Know How She Does It (2011), which earned her the Young Artist Award as Best Young Actress Age Ten and Under.

== Career ==
Lyle portrayed Nicole Bloom in the feature film Why Stop Now (2012), which earned her a Young Artist Award nomination as Best Supporting Young Actress Age Ten and Under. She is also known for her role as Jackie in Return (2011), where she plays Linda Cardellini and Michael Shannon's daughter. She plays the role of 'Bridgette' in her latest film Jessica Darling's It List (2016), based on the book series by Megan McCafferty.

== Filmography ==
=== Film ===
Year	Title	Role	Notes
2010	D.I.G.I.T.A.L. High	Daughter	Lead
2010	The Shoebox	Daughter	Lead
2011	I Don't Know How She Does It	Emily Reddy	Supporting
2011	Return	Jackie	Lead
2012	Why Stop Now	Nicole	Lead
2012	Little Red Wagon	Little Girl in Box	Supporting
2013	House Hunting	Lizzy	Lead
2014	Hamlet & Hutch	Liv	Lead
2015	Blue	Josie Murphy	Supporting
2016	Jessica Darling's It List	Bridget	Lead
2018	Mail Order Monster	PJ	Supporting

=== Television ===
Year	Title	Role	Notes
2017	Mr. Mercedes	Tina	Episode: 105
2012	Law & Order: Special Victims Unit	Lily Whitley	Episode: Father's Shadow
2012	The Mentalist	Hailey	Episode: Red Rover, Red Rover

=== Theatre ===
Year	Title	Role	Notes
2011	Good People	Ali	Samuel J. Friedman Theater

== Awards and nominations ==
Year	Award	Category	Work	Result
2012	33rd Young Artist Awards	Best Performance in a Feature Film – Young Actress Ten and Under	I Don't Know How She Does It	Won
2013	34th Young Artist Awards	Best Performance in a Feature Film – Supporting Young Actress Ten and Under	Why Stop Now	Nominated
2013	34th Young Artist Awards	Best Performance in a TV Series – Guest Starring Young Actress Ten and Under	Law & Order: Special Victims Unit	Nominated
