= Echo Burning =

2001 novel by Lee Child

- First edition (UK)
- Author: Lee Child
- Language: English
- Series: Jack Reacher
- Release number: 5
- Genre: Thriller
- Publisher: Bantam Press (United Kingdom); Putnam (United States)
- Publication date: 2 April 2001
- Publication place: United Kingdom
- Media type: Print (hardcover and paperback)
- Pages: 397
- ISBN: 0-593-04659-5
- OCLC: 45172110
- Dewey Decimal: 813.54
- LC Class: PS3553.H4838 E29 2001
- Preceded by: The Visitor
- Followed by: Without Fail

Echo Burning is the fifth novel in the Jack Reacher series written by Lee Child. It was published in 2001 by Putnam in America and Bantam in the United Kingdom. It is written in the third person.

== Plot ==
Jack Reacher breaks a bully's nose and finger after being repeatedly provoked in a Texas saloon, so when the bully turns out to be a local cop and shows up with three of his colleagues the following day to arrest him, Reacher decides it's time to move on. He chooses hitchhiking as the fastest escape and hooks up with a driver of Mexican heritage named Carmen Greer. She says that the only reason she stopped, however, is because she has a problem: Her tax-evading husband, Sloop, is coming out of prison soon, and he will inevitably continue beating her as he did so many times before, especially because he knows she was the one who informed on him. Carmen has been diligently searching for candidates to kill him, and she thinks Reacher's military background may qualify him for the job. Reacher initially refuses and even leaps out of the car and back into the sweltering 110 °F (43 °C) heat, but he quickly realizes this is a bad idea and agrees to accept a ride back to her ranch. It is there that Carmen, her husband Sloop and the rest of his family live. Reacher is promising nothing more than to look into the situation and, if necessary, to act as her bodyguard. Carmen and Reacher then proceed to pick up her six-year-old daughter Ellie, who gets on well with Reacher.

Meanwhile, two other groups are introduced: a group of watchers, composed of two men and a boy who have been staking out the ranch, and a trio of hitmen (two men and one woman who subsequently kill the first group on the orders of their mutual employer after murdering Al Eugene, the lawyer who had secured Sloop's release.

Carmen and Reacher arrive back at the ranch, but Reacher does not receive a warm welcome from Sloop's bigoted mother, brother, or the two ranch hands who work there. Reacher gets the Greers to hire him as a wrangler, and teaches Carmen how to handle a firearm. The family orders the other ranch hands to dispose of Reacher; he subdues them and returns unharmed. Sloop then arrives, and claims Reacher is trespassing; he is arrested and removed by Texas Rangers.

En route, the rangers are called back: Sloop has been shot and killed, and the authorities charge Carmen with the murder after finding a gun. Furthermore, while she is incarcerated, she suddenly confesses to the murder and firmly rejects legal help from Alice Amanda Aaron, the pro bono attorney whom Reacher had procured for her.

Assisted and also manipulated by Hack Walker, the Pecos County district attorney and an old friend of Sloop's, Reacher and Alice discover a cover-up related to the murder of several illegal immigrants by Hack, Sloop, and Eugene when they were younger. Reacher concludes that Hack orchestrated the current murders in order to protect his career and election chances, and that he is pressuring Carmen to confess by threatening Ellie's life. Reacher kills two of the hit-men in an ambush and confronts Hack at the ranch, whereupon Sloop's mother kills Hack and a fire breaks out which burns down the house. After tracking down and subduing the third hit-man at a motel, preventing him from killing Ellie, Reacher leaves Carmen to start a new life as he hitchhikes out of Texas.

== Production ==
Child finished writing Echo Burning in March 2000. The book was released in the United Kingdom and its territories on 2 April 2001, and the American publication followed on 25 June of the same year.

The original idea for Echo Burning came from two sources. The first was an idea he had in which he wondered what it would be like for a woman whose husband was returning home from jail, but didn't want him to return. He also took inspiration from seeing the grave of the gunfighter Clay Allison who "never killed a man that did not need killing." He wondered what it would be like if Reacher was confronted by a man he had been told needed killing.

Child wanted Carmen Greer to appear as a character whom readers would not know whether or not to trust. He has also said how he wanted Alice Amanda Aaron, the Harvard educated, vegetarian, lesbian, attorney Reacher hires, to be a reflection of how diverse America is; he can be quoted as saying "she's totally normal in New York, but a freak in Texas."
