= Why Stop Now (film) =

- Theatrical release poster
- Directed by: Phil Dorling; Ron Nyswaner
- Written by: Phil Dorling; Ron Nyswaner
- Produced by: Neda Armian; Brice Dal Farra; Claude Dal Farra; Lauren Munsch; Ron Nyswaner; Paul Prokop
- Starring: Jesse Eisenberg; Melissa Leo; Tracy Morgan
- Cinematography: Ben Kutchins
- Edited by: Suzy Elmiger; Colleen Sharp
- Music by: Spencer David Hutchings
- Production company: BCDF Pictures
- Distributed by: IFC Films
- Release dates: January 27, 2012 (Sundance); August 17, 2012 (United States)
- Running time: 88 minutes
- Country: United States
- Languages: English; Spanish
- Box office: $2,432

Why Stop Now is a 2012 American comedy-drama film written and directed by Phil Dorling and Ron Nyswaner and starring Jesse Eisenberg, Melissa Leo, and Tracy Morgan. It is a feature-length adaptation of their 2008 short film, Predisposed.

== Plot ==
Eli Bloom is a young piano prodigy and supermarket clerk who gets wasted the night before his audition for a prestigious music conservatory, embarrassing himself at a party in front of his longtime crush Chloe. In the morning, he has to take his mother, Penny, to rehab for her drug abuse, and his younger sister, Nicole, to school, where her teacher, Lisa, tells Eli that Nicole's sock-puppet friend has been insulting her classmates. Promising to take care of it, Eli takes off to drop Penny off, but she does not qualify for rehab due to lack of insurance. At the center, a nurse tells Penny to go out, get high, and come back with "dirty urine" to get in. Penny enlists Eli to go see her drug dealer, Sprinkles, for cocaine. While visiting Sprinkles and his companion Black, Eli becomes the translator for Sprinkles and his dealer, Eduardo.

Meeting Eduardo at a Puerto Rican restaurant, Eli translates what turns into an argument and is shoved to the floor by Eduardo, injuring his right hand, thus putting his audition in jeopardy. In the ensuing car ride, Eli accidentally consumes Penny's oxycodone pills. Arriving at the school for his audition, Eli runs into Chloe with a group of American Revolutionary War reenactors (whom Sprinkles mistakenly identifies as civil war reenactors), and she helps him prepare. Eli begins to play his piece but fails to finish because of his injured hand and attitude from the pills.

Leaving the auditorium, embarrassed, Sprinkles shows Eli and Penny the trophy he won for his track record. Sprinkles steals the trophy and he, Eli, Penny, and Black go to pick up Nicole. They drop Nicole off at Penny's sister Trish's, who doesn't like having Penny around because of her drug habit and the fact that she allegedly "completely ruined last Christmas". Eli talks Trish into watching Nicole for a couple hours while he, Penny, and his "colleagues from the supermarket" go do some stuff.

The group returns to the Puerto Rican restaurant to find a party in progress. Sprinkles and Black pick up the drugs while Eduardo dances with Eli's mother. Eli and Sprinkles drink tequila at the bar, and Sprinkles assures Eli he is a musical genius and encourages him to pursue his dream. He also gives Eli the cocaine his mom needs. Eli tells his mom to take the drugs, but she refuses, saying she no longer needs rehab. He calls her a liar and storms out.

Eli runs into the reenactors on the street and reveals his feelings to Chloe. Eli gets a call from his mom and runs to Trish's house to find her hysterical as Trish is hiding Nicole in the bathroom until Penny leaves. Eli chastises Trish, tells Nicole to stop using the puppet, and tells Penny that Nicole can't come home unless she goes to rehab. They agree that Trish will look after Nicole while Eli's mom gets help.

Eli takes Penny back to the rehab clinic and keeps watch while she does the cocaine. She apologizes to Eli and says she wants him to go to the conservatory. She also tells him addiction runs in his genes and he will end up in rehab eventually, then goes to check in. Eli returns to the reenactment area to find Chloe. Eli's piano teacher calls him to say that the judges, surprisingly, want him back for another audition the following day. Chloe gives him a hat and character name to join the reenactment, signaling the start of their relationship. The next day Eli plays beautifully at the audition despite his hand injury.

== Cast ==
- Jesse Eisenberg as Eli "Mozart" Bloom
- Melissa Leo as Penny Bloom
- Tracy Morgan as Leopold "Sprinkles" Leonard
- Isiah Whitlock, Jr. as Black
- Emma Rayne Lyle as Nicole Bloom
- Sarah Ramos as Chloe
- Stephanie March as Trish
- Tanya Wright as Lisa
- Paul Calderón as Eduardo
- Jayce Bartok as Nurse Mike
- Neal Huff as Dave

== Release ==
The film had its premiere at the 2012 Sundance Film Festival on January 27, 2012 and had a limited theatrical release in the US on August 17, 2012.

== Reception ==
As of June 2020, the film holds a 25% approval rating on Rotten Tomatoes, based on 20 reviews with an average score of 4.46 out of 10. It holds score of 36 out of 100 score on Metacritic based on 10 reviews, indicating "generally unfavorable reviews". Film critic Roger Ebert gave "Why Stop Now" three-and-a-half stars out of four, commenting: "Week after week, we get dimwitted comedies, and then a charmer like this comes along, and it gets a limited release. 'Why Stop Now' is a bright screwball comedy about one fraught day in the life of a piano prodigy, his addict mother and her drug dealers."

== Accolades ==
Emma Rayne Lyle was nominated for the Best Performance in a Feature Film - Supporting Young Actress Ten and Under at the 34th Young Artist Awards in 2013.
