= Maureen Dragone =

American journalist and author

- Born: Maureen Laing; January 20, 1920; Phoenix, Arizona U.S.
- Died: February 8, 2013 (aged 93); Los Angeles, California U.S.
- Occupations: Journalist, author, philanthropist Hollywood Foreign Press member Young Artist Awards founder

Maureen Dragone (January 20, 1920 – February 8, 2013) was an American journalist and author. She was one of the longest-standing members of the Hollywood Foreign Press Association which presents the annual Golden Globe Awards. In 1978 she founded the Young Artist Association, which presents the annual Young Artist Awards.

== Early life ==
Dragone was born Maureen Laing in Phoenix, Arizona. She moved to North Hollywood, Los Angeles with her parents at the age of 10 and attended North Hollywood High School. Her father, Canadian World War I veteran, Captain Alfred Benson Laing, was a builder and writer for trade journals, and her mother, Nora Laing, was an entertainment correspondent for numerous international publications and co-founder of the Hollywood Foreign Press Association (HFPA). Discussions regarding the formation of the HFPA, which presented the first annual Golden Globe Awards ceremony in 1944, are said to have taken place at the dining room table in her childhood home.

== Hollywood Foreign Press Association ==
Dragone wrote for numerous international newspapers and magazines and was said to have interviewed hundreds of celebrities throughout the course of her career. She was a member of the Hollywood Foreign Press Association for more than 50 years and was regarded as the "recognized historian" of the HFPA. In 2005, Dragone authored the book Who Makes the Golden Globes Go Around? which chronicled the history of the HFPA and its annual Golden Globe Awards ceremony. Prior to her death in 2013, she was the only living HFPA member to have attended all 70 Golden Globes ceremonies and was bestowed with an honorary "lifetime membership" to the association.

== Young Artist Association ==
In 1978, Dragone founded the Youth in Film Association (now known as the Young Artist Association), which presents Hollywood's annual Young Artist Awards to specifically recognize and honor outstanding contributions of child stars working within the entertainment industry who might otherwise be overlooked for other industry awards when judged alongside their adult counterparts. The association also sponsors the Young Artist Foundation which grants scholarships to young performers who may be physically and/or financially challenged, enabling them to attend a performing arts school of their choice. As of 2013, the Young Artist Awards and the Young Artist Foundation scholarship fund are still presented annually.

== Personal life ==
Dragone lived in North Hollywood, Los Angeles for the majority of her life and was married to Michael Dragone until his death in 1986. She had two children; Michael, Jr. and Shirley. She had three grandchildren; Heather, Holly and Frank, and four great-grandchildren; Samantha, Don, Alexandra and Benjamin. In 1987, Dragone became the companion of Dan Kitchel, whom she would remain with for the next 25 years, until her death in 2013. In one of her final statements, Dragone was quoted as saying, "I did everything that I ever wanted to do, and did it my way."

== Death ==
Dragone died on February 8, 2013, at a hospice in Los Angeles following a brief illness. After her death, a statement was posted on the HFPA's Golden Globes website, which read, "She will be missed, and was loved by so many people." The Young Artist Association that she founded announced its plans to feature a memorial tribute at the 34th Annual Young Artist Awards ceremony in her honor.
