= Jeff Gardere =

American psychologist, author, TV show consultant and media personality

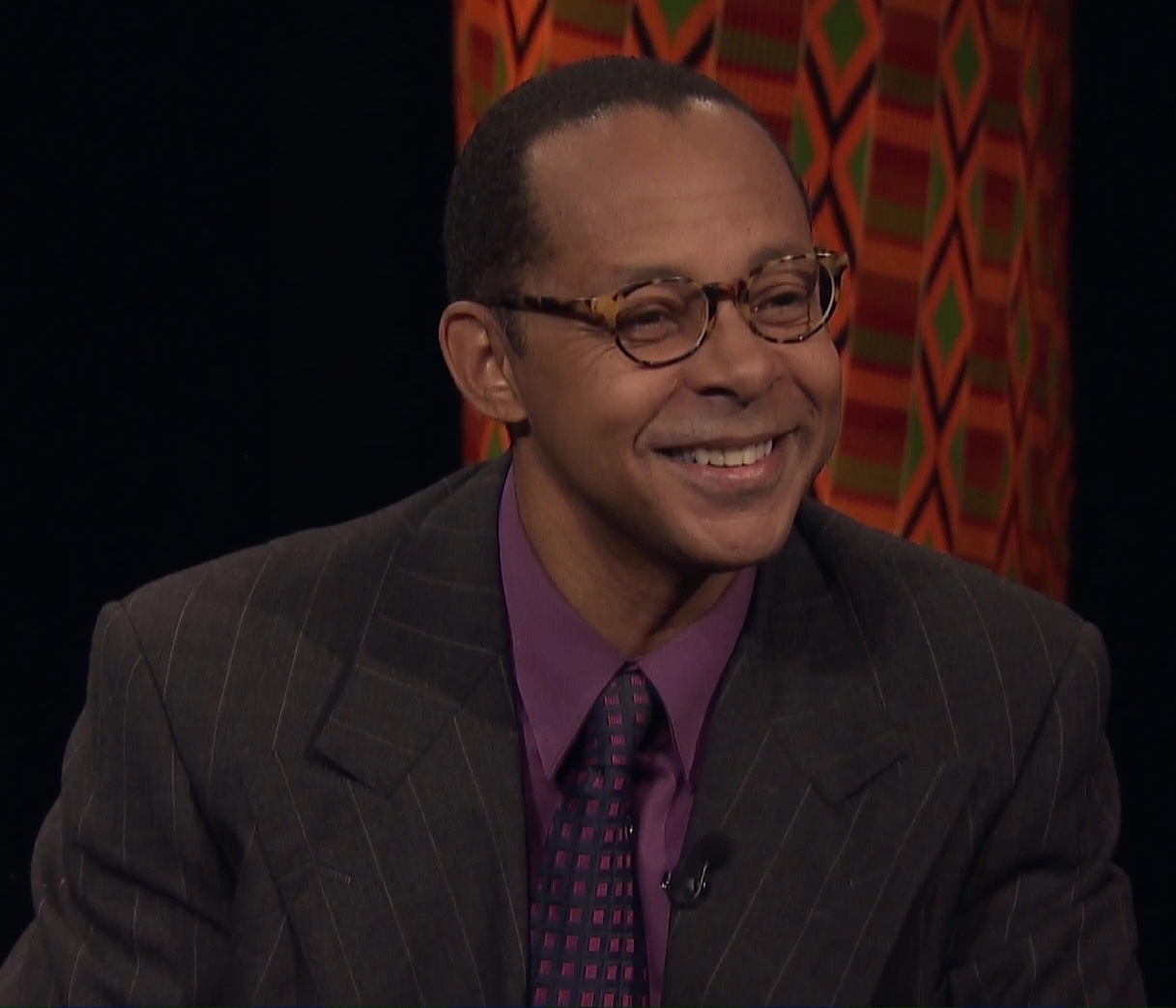
- Gardere on CUNY TV's African American Legends, 2011
- Born: Jeffrey Roger Gardere; May 3, 1956 (age 70); Brooklyn, New York, United States
- Education: University of Rochester (BA); Columbia University (MS); George Washington University (PhD)
- Occupations: Psychologist, TV show consultant, and author
- Years active: 1990–present
- Employer: Touro College of Osteopathic Medicine
- Website: www.drjeffgardere.com

Jeffrey Roger Gardere (born May 3, 1956), is an American psychologist, TV show consultant and media personality better known as Dr. Jeff and "America’s Psychologist".

== Early life and education ==
Gardere was born in Manhattan, New York to Roger and Renée Gardere who were both from Haiti. Gardere was one of the first black students to attend the St. Francis Xavier Catholic School in Park Slope, Brooklyn. He then attended the Brooklyn Technical High School.

He received his Bachelor of Arts Degree in psychology from the University of Rochester and his Masters of Science from Columbia University. He later attended George Washington University, obtaining a PhD in clinical psychology and philosophy.

== Career ==
After leaving George Washington University, Gardere worked as a staff psychologist for the Federal Bureau of Prisons. He soon rose to the office of chief psychologist – one of only two African-American chief psychologists at the time. During his tenure there, he was instrumental in designing the policy on psychological treatment for HIV-infected prisoners. He also participated in hostage negotiations at the Atlanta Prison Siege of 1987.

Gardere is also an Associate Professor and Course Director of Behavioral Medicine at Touro College of Osteopathic Medicine in New York City.

He hosted the VH1 TV show Dad Camp and was the psychologist on The Real Housewives of Atlanta and The Real Housewives of Potomac. He is the principal psychologist on Love & Hip Hop: New York and Love & Hip Hop: Atlanta, For My Man on TV One, Celebrity Damage Control and They Got Away With It on the Reelz Channel. He is a psychologist for Lauren Lake's Paternity Court and Couples Court with the Cutlers.

== Personal life ==
Gardere is a father of six and is Catholic.

== See also ==
- Touro College
