= Christian Traeumer =

American actor (born 2000)

- Born: March 25, 2000 (age 25); San Jose, California, U.S.
- Occupation: Actor
- Years active: 2009–present

Christian Traeumer (born March 25, 2000) is an American actor. Beginning his professional acting career at the age of five, Traeumer is a Young Artist Award Best Leading Young Actor nominee for his role in the 2012 feature film The Child.

== Biography ==
Christian Antonio Traeumer was born March 25, 2000, in San Jose, California. In 2004, he relocated to Los Angeles, California. In 2005, he booked his first commercial for a regional advertisement.

At the age of nine he was cast for a short film called “Redemption”. Christian also has worked on shows such as “Your Kid ate What?” a real life reenactment show where he guest starred as Andrew Rivera. Dad Camp where he starred as himself as a nine-year-old boy who was raised without a Dad, showing the effects of being the product of a "single parent” and “Kidnap & Rescue” where he was the lead “Miko”. At the age of ten he landed his first feature film role in the adaptation of the best selling novel by Rudolfo Anaya “Bless Me, Ultima” where he played “Bones”.

Less than six months later he was boarding a plane to Berlin, Germany to play the lead role of “Simon Sachs” a terminally ill brain tumor patient who believes he is a serial killer in a past life in the adaptation of the best selling novel “Das Kind” (The Child) written by Sebastian Fitzek with a release date of October 2012 . Christian starred with Eric Roberts, Sunny Mabrey, Ben Becker and Peter Greene.

Christian has studied at the conservatory of fine arts at Cal State University Los Angeles, and soon the Performing arts Magnet at Miliken school in Sherman Oaks, California.

== Filmography ==
Film and Television
Year	Title	Role	Notes
2009	Redemption (short)	Tommy Reyes	
2010	Walter (short)	Young Walter	
2010	It Can Be Arranged	Blake	
2010	The Activist (short)	Son, age 7	
2010	You Kid Ate What? (TV Series)	Andrew Rivera	Episode "Parents' Worst Nightmare"
2010	Dad Camp (TV Series)	himself	
2011	Kidnap & Rescue	Miko	2 episodes
2011	Bolero	Thomas	Won - Young Artist Award for Best Performance in a Short Film - Young Actor 11 and 12
2012	Bless Me, Ultima	Bones	
2012	The Child	Simon Sachs	Nominated - Young Artist Award for Best Performance in a Feature Film - Leading Young Actor
2013	Armo	Darius	
