= The Christmas Consultant =

- German DVD cover marketing the film as Christmas Planner
- Written by: Gregg Rossen, Brian Sawyer
- Directed by: John Bradshaw
- Starring: David Hasselhoff; Caroline Rhea; Barclay Hope
- Theme music composer: Christopher Nickel
- Country of origin: Canada
- Original language: English

Production
- Cinematography: Paul Mitchnick
- Editor: Michael John Bateman
- Running time: 88 minutes
- Production companies: 224 Entertainment, Reel One Entertainment

Original release
- Network: Lifetime
- Release: November 10, 2012

The Christmas Consultant (released in Germany as Christmas Planner) is a 2012 American holiday film starring David Hasselhoff. The movie aired on the Lifetime Channel on November 10, 2012 and was released to DVD in Germany and the United States in October 2013.

== Synopsis ==
The movie follows the Fletcher family, specifically perfume executive Maya (Caroline Rhea) and her equally busy husband Jack (Barclay Hope). Both of them are busy dealing with the stress of their demanding jobs as well as with the effect that a recent move for Maya's career has had on their children. In order to impress both her boss and a potential new client, Maya agrees to host a Christmas party at her new home. This puts extra stress on her especially since both her and Jack's relatives have made plans to spend the holidays at their new house.

Jack suggests that Maya hire Owen (David Hasselhoff), a prestigious Christmas consultant, to plan the party in her stead. Despite some initial hesitations, the Fletchers hire Owen, who states that he will work every day except for Christmas Day, which he will spend with his family. He quickly endears himself to the family, helping son David (Darien Provost) overcome a local bully and eldest daughter Anna (Jessica McLeod) get a date with her crush. Owen even helps the Fletchers' youngest daughter Steffie (Eliza Faria) come out of her shell and stop creating gory and morbid fantasies involving her toys. However, in the process, Maya feels left out and grows even more stressed, as she feels like Owen is replacing her in the family.

On the night of the Christmas party, Maya's stress comes to a head when her children make a point of specially thanking Owen in front of all of the guests and family members. Upset, Maya confronts everyone and ends up not only ruining the party, but running off the guests and her client. Horrified at the loss of the client, Maya's boss immediately fires Maya. The following morning, Maya apologizes to her family, who forgive her for her actions.

Maya travels to Owen's house to apologize, only to discover that Owen isn't there and that his wife had died five years ago. She also discovers that his claims of having two children were also false and that he'd made them up. Maya discovers Owen as he's walking through town looking at window displays and apologizes, also telling him that she's aware that he'd lied about his family. He admits that he made up most of the stories in an attempt to deal with her death. Maya persuades him to come home with her, as she views him as a member of the family. She's surprised when her boss returns with the client, who tell Maya that she's rehired and that after the party, Maya's boss and the client had become a couple. Then, one last family member arrives, Maya's cousin, who shares an instant connection with him. The movie ends with everyone singing around the Christmas tree and Maya asking Owen if he does New Year's Eve parties.

== Cast ==
- David Hasselhoff as Owen
- Caroline Rhea as Maya Fletcher
- Barclay Hope as Jack Fletcher
- Eliza Faria as Steffie Fletcher
- Jessica McLeod as Anna Fletcher
- Darien Provost as David Fletcher
- Lanette Ware as Nadine

== Reception ==
Critical reception for The Christmas Consultant was mixed but since its airing has been called a "camp classic". The SF Gate remarked that Hasslehoff was miscast as Owen, but that "he makes the film more fun than it probably should be" and that the miscasting allowed the film to stand out from similarly themed Christmas movies. Crushable panned the film, saying that it highlighted "all the worst parts of the Christmas season" and was "Lifetime's most depressing movie ever". The Soup poked fun at Hasselhoff's role in the film, which they deemed "creepy". MSN's TV Buzz blog would later remark that The Soup's coverage drew added attention to the movie, as the original ratings were so low that Lifetime initially did not plan to re-show it. After noticing the attention that the film was getting, Lifetime scheduled additional showings of The Christmas Consultant.

Hasselhoff has commented on the role, calling it "corny" but that "in his world, that's never a bad thing."

== Accolades ==
| Year | Award | Category | Recipient | Result | Ref. |
|---|---|---|---|---|---|
| 2013 | Young Artist Award | Best Performance in a TV Movie, Miniseries, Special or Pilot - Supporting Young Actor | Darien Provost | Nominated | |
| 2013 | Young Artist Award | Best Performance in a TV Movie, Miniseries, Special or Pilot - Supporting Young Actress | Eliza Faria | Won | |

== See also ==
- List of Christmas films
