= Danneel Ackles =

American actress (born 1979)

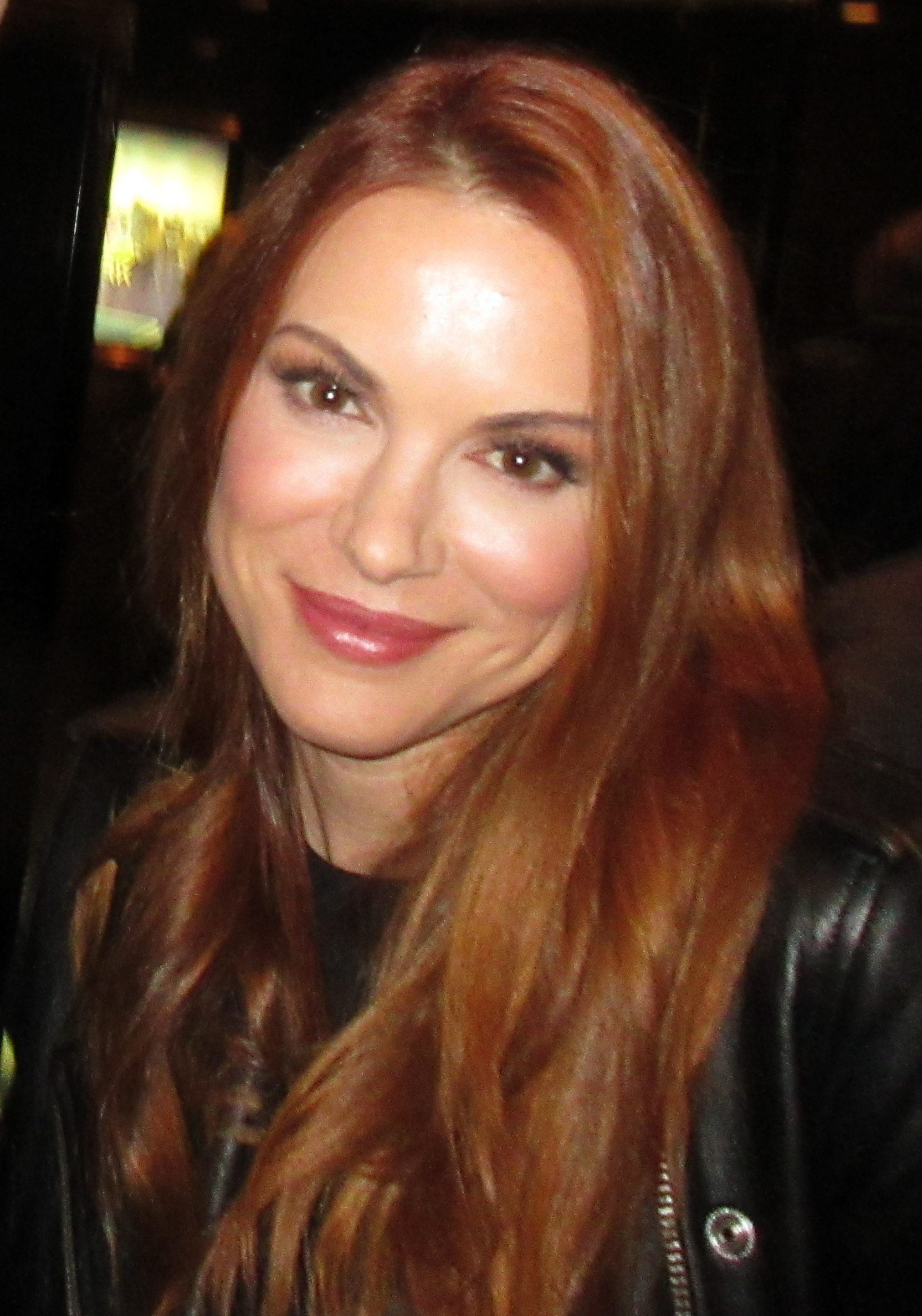
- Ackles in 2018
- Born: Elta Danneel Graul; March 18, 1979 (age 47); Lafayette, Louisiana, U.S.
- Other names: Danneel Harris; Danneel Graul
- Occupation: Actress
- Years active: 1999–present
- Spouse: Jensen Ackles (m. 2010)
- Children: 3

Danneel Ackles (née Elta Danneel Graul; born March 18, 1979), credited professionally before 2012 as Danneel Harris, is an American actress. She played the role of Shannon McBain on the American daytime soap opera One Life to Live and Rachel Gatina on the WB/CW television drama series One Tree Hill.

== Early life ==
Elta Danneel Graul was born in Lafayette, Louisiana, and raised in nearby Eunice, a small town in St. Landry Parish. Her father, Edward E. Graul Jr., is a practicing ophthalmologist and her mother, Deborah Graul, works as an interior designer. She was named after her great-grandmother. Her first name is Elta, but she goes by her middle name, Danneel, professionally. The name "Danneel" was inspired by Danneel Street in New Orleans. She first moved to Los Angeles to pursue a modeling career.

== Career ==
Before she landed her first acting role, Harris worked as a model with such companies as Big Sexy Hair and Juicy Jeans. She first appeared in a television commercial. In 2003, Harris landed her first role on the ABC soap opera television series One Life to Live as Shannon McBain, a student attending the fictional Llanview University. Harris relocated to New York for the role, and left the series in December 2004. Harris has since gone on to appear in shows such as JAG, Charmed, CSI: Crime Scene Investigation, What I Like About You, NCIS, and Joey. Harris's first film role was in the short film The Plight of Clownana.

In 2005, Harris began a major recurring role in the third season of The WB/CW television drama series One Tree Hill. Harris portrayed the role of Rachel Gatina, a bad girl who creates havoc for the residents of Tree Hill and returned to her role as a series regular for the show's fourth season. However, in season five Harris only reprises the role of Rachel in two episodes due to the season’s format change. In June 2009, Harris was confirmed to reprise the role of Rachel in the series seventh season over the course of seven episodes. Harris was in-talks to return for the series eighth season, but, due to scheduling conflicts, these plans never materialized.

In January 2007, Harris was the female lead in the New Line Cinema Comedy film Harold & Kumar Escape from Guantanamo Bay, the sequel to the 2004 film Harold & Kumar Go to White Castle. Filming took place in Shreveport, Louisiana, that same month. The film was released in April 2008 to mostly negative reviews (with aggregator website Rotten Tomatoes giving it an average of 53%), despite the film grossing over $43,439,123 worldwide. Harris reprised the role of Vanessa Fanning in the third and final installment of the trilogy, A Very Harold & Kumar 3D Christmas, which was released in November 2011. In both 2009 and 2010, Harris had small supporting roles in the films Fired Up! and The Back-up Plan.

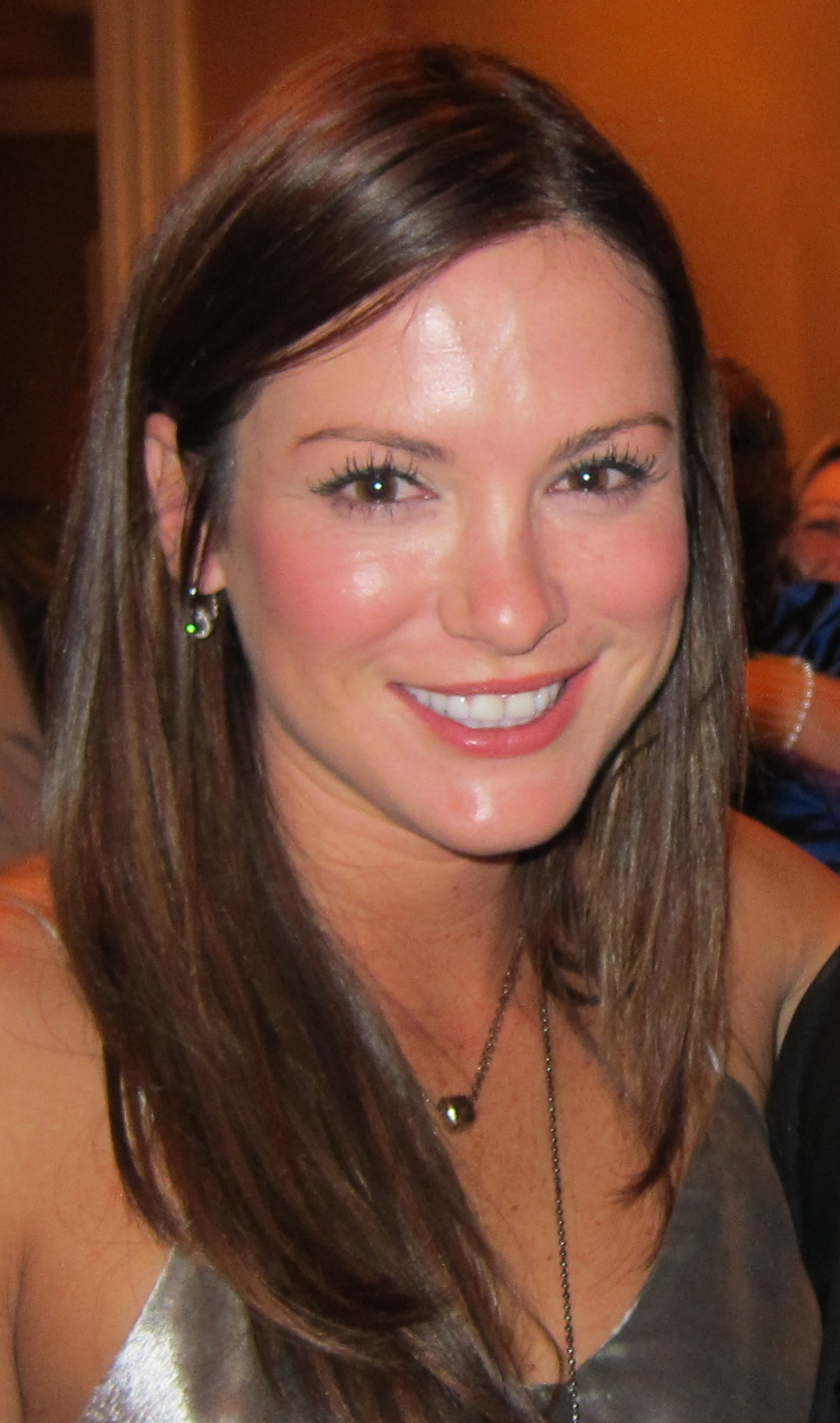
Harris in 2011

In May 2009, Harris was cast in the Screen Gems Thriller film The Roommate. The film, also starring Leighton Meester and Cam Gigandet, centers on a college freshman whose roommate has a violent obsession with her. Harris portrays Irene Crew, a high-profile fashion designer. The film was shot on location at the University of Southern California in Los Angeles, and suffered numerous push-backs for unknown reasons. The film was eventually released in February 2011 to a $15.6 million opening weekend despite negative reviews from critics and went on to gross over $40 million worldwide.

In September 2009, Harris appeared in the sitcom television series pilot Friends with Benefits, which was picked up by NBC. It was originally set to air as a midseason replacement during the 2010–11 television season, but was delayed until August 2011. Harris took on the role of Sara Maxwell, a doctor desperate to find the right guy. The series premiered to a low 2.34 million viewers and to mixed reviews from critics. The series was not renewed.

In June 2012, Harris, now going by the professional name Danneel Ackles, was brought in for a recurring role in the second season of the TV Land series Retired at 35. In December 2017, it was announced that Ackles had been cast in the recurring role of Sister Jo in thirteenth season of The CW television series Supernatural alongside her husband, Jensen Ackles. She appeared in a Lifetime television film, The Christmas Contract (2018), alongside former One Tree Hill co-stars Hilarie Burton, Robert Buckley, Tyler Hilton and Antwon Tanner.

More recently, Jensen and Danneel Ackles formed Chaos Machine Productions with a deal at Warner Bros. Television.

== Personal life ==
Harris became engaged to Jensen Ackles in November 2009 and the couple married on May 15, 2010, in Dallas, Texas. It was announced on January 7, 2013, that the couple was expecting their first child together. Their daughter was born in May 2013. On August 10, 2016, the couple announced that they were expecting twins together, later in the year. Their twins, a son and a daughter, were born in December 2016.

== Filmography ==
=== Film ===
Year	Title	Role	Notes
2004	The Plight of Clownana	Dildo Man's Fan	Short film; as Danneel Graul
2005	Rule Number One	April	Short film
2007	Ten Inch Hero	Platisha 'Tish' Madison	
2008	Harold & Kumar Escape from Guantanamo Bay	Vanessa Fanning	
2008	Harold & Kumar Go to Amsterdam	Vanessa Fanning	Short film
2008	Extreme Movie	Melissa	
2009	Still Waiting...	Sherry	Direct-to-video
2009	Fired Up!	Bianca	
2010	The Back-up Plan	Olivia	
2011	The Roommate	Irene Crew	
2011	A Very Harold & Kumar 3D Christmas	Vanessa Fanning	
2012	Mardi Gras: Spring Break	Erica	
2014	TSA America: Suspicious Bulges	Christine	Short film

=== Television ===
Year	Title	Role	Notes
1999–2004	One Life to Live	Shannon McBain	Contract role; 68 episodes
2004	What I Like About You	Kate	4 episodes (season 2)
2004–2005	Joey	London / Katie Harper	3 episodes
2005	Charmed	Glamour disguise Paige Matthews	Episode: "Something Wicca This Way Goes"
2005	JAG	Cammie Cresswell	Episodes: "Straits of Malacca", "Death at the Mosque"
2005–2010	One Tree Hill	Rachel Gatina	Recurring role (seasons 3, 5, 7); main role (season 4); 52 episodes
2007	CSI: Crime Scene Investigation	Shasta McCloud	Episode: "A La Cart"
2008	Free Radio	Danneel Harris	Episode: "Lance Gets a Bodyguard"
2008	How I Met Your Mother	Nora Zinman	Episode: "Shelter Island"
2009	NCIS	Jessica Shore	Episode: "Love & War"
2009	Trust Me	Jessica	Episode: "All Hell the Victors"
2009	CSI: Miami	Abby Dawson	Episode: "Sink or Swim"
2011	Friends with Benefits	Sara Maxwell	Main role
2012	Retired at 35	Jenn Harris	3 episodes (season 2)
2012	Naughty or Nice	Jill Rhodes	Television film
2013	How to Live with Your Parents...	Olivia	Episodes: "How to Fix Up Your Ex", "How to Live with Your Parents for the Rest of Your Life"
2014	Baby Boot Camp	Julia	Television film
2018–2020	Supernatural	Sister Jo / Anael	Recurring role (seasons 13–15); 5 episodes
2018	The Christmas Contract	Naomi	Television film
