= Retired at 35 =

- Season 1 intertitle
- Genre: Sitcom
- Created by: Chris Case
- Starring: George Segal; Johnathan McClain; Josh McDermitt; Ryan Michelle Bathe; Marissa Jaret Winokur; Jessica Walter
- Composers: Ron Wasserman; Emerson Swinford
- Country of origin: United States
- Original language: English
- No. of seasons: 2
- No. of episodes: 20

Production
- Executive producers: Chris Case; Michael Hanel; Mindy Schultheis
- Producer: Franco E. Bario
- Camera setup: Multi-camera
- Running time: 30 minutes
- Production companies: Fore Left Productions; Acme Productions; TV Land Original Productions

Original release
- Network: TV Land
- Release: January 19, 2011 – August 29, 2012

Retired at 35 is an American sitcom on TV Land starring George Segal, Jessica Walter, Johnathan McClain, Josh McDermitt, Marissa Jaret Winokur, and Ryan Michelle Bathe. It is the network's second original scripted series after Hot in Cleveland. The series premiered on January 19, 2011. On March 21, 2011, the series was renewed for a second season. The second season premiered on Tuesday, June 26, 2012, at 10:00 pm ET/PT, and concluded on Wednesday, August 29, 2012.

On December 13, 2012, TV Land announced that they were not renewing Retired at 35 for another season and it was cancelled, making it the first TV Land original sitcom to be cancelled from the network.

== Premise ==
The series follows a successful New Yorker named David (Johnathan McClain), who decides to leave the rat race and his job in the big city to visit his father (George Segal) and mother (Jessica Walter) who live in a retirement community in Florida. Hoping to reconnect with them and re-evaluate his life, he makes a snap decision to quit his job and take some time to live the dream of retirement that so many are working toward. But he soon finds, to his surprise, that his parents are in the final stages of separating.

== Cast and characters ==
=== Main cast ===
- George Segal as Alan Robbins
- Johnathan McClain as David Robbins
- Jessica Walter as Elaine Robbins
- Josh McDermitt as Brandon
- Ryan Michelle Bathe as Jessica Sanders (season 1)
- Marissa Jaret Winokur as Amy Robbins (season 2)
  - Casey Wilson played the role of Amy Robbins in the pilot episode, prior to joining the cast of the ABC sitcom Happy Endings

=== Recurring cast ===
- George Wyner as Richard
- Peter Bonerz as Chuckie Lutz
- Christine Ebersole as Susan (season 1)
- John Ross Bowie as Jared (season 2)
- Danneel Ackles as Jenn (season 2)

=== Guest cast ===
- Estelle Harris
- Mimi Kennedy
- Mark Christopher Lawrence
- Shelley Long
- John O'Hurley
- Christina Pickles
- Jay Thomas
- Ashley Williams
- Fred Willard
- Robin Givens
- Melissa Peterman

== Episodes ==
Season	Episodes	Originally released	
Season	Episodes	First released	Last released
1	10	January 19, 2011	March 23, 2011
2	10	June 26, 2012	August 29, 2012

=== Season 1 (2011) ===
No. overall	No. in season	Title	Directed by	Written by	Original release date	Prod. code	U.S. viewers (millions)
1	1	"Pilot"	Andy Cadiff	Chris Case	January 19, 2011	101	2.01
David Robbins (Johnathan McClain), a successful company man from New York, visits his retired parents Alan and Elaine (George Segal and Jessica Walter) in Florida. Still stressed out from his job, he decides to permanently move in with them just as his mother has decided to separate from his father. David then helps his heartbroken father by setting him up on a blind date with Susan (Christine Ebersole), a woman close to Alan's age. When Alan passes on the date, David unexpectedly gets sexually involved with Susan, who also happens to be the adoptive mother of his childhood crush, Jessica (Ryan Michelle Bathe).
2	2	"Hit It and Quit It"	Andy Cadiff	Diane Burroughs & Joey Gutierrez	January 26, 2011	102	1.49
David tries his best to bring Alan and Elaine back together, but unbeknownst to him they have already reconciled by having a sex-only relationship with no emotional connections.
3	3	"Rocket Man"	Andy Cadiff	Mark Reisman	February 2, 2011	104	1.43
Alan becomes jealous when David is accompanying Elaine on dates with her new astronaut boyfriend Dan (John O'Hurley). It bothers Alan so much that he forbids David to meet them anymore.
4	4	"David's Room"	Andy Cadiff	Chris Case	February 9, 2011	110	1.27
Alan and Elaine compete for David's attention by fixing a him a fancy bedroom in each of their homes.
5	5	"The Matchmakers"	Andy Cadiff	Victor Levin	February 16, 2011	106	1.28
David and Brandon arrange for Alan to date a number of available single women in town, until Peter Dixon (Fred Willard), the retirement community's "it" boy, steals Alan's thunder.
6	6	"Stuck in the Meddle"	Andy Cadiff	Eric Weinberg	February 23, 2011	105	1.15
In an effort to stop Elaine from meddling in his dating life, David tells a lie about a date going badly that she had set up with a friend's daughter named Lilah (Ashley Williams). When the relationship continues to go well, David has to tell one lie after another. Unfortunately for David, his true love Jessica finally decides to give him a chance...just before she discovers David has taken the "next step" with Lilah.
7	7	"Gate Gate"	Andy Cadiff	Eric Weinberg	March 2, 2011	103	1.18
David is frustrated by cars speeding down his street and asks that a speed gate be built there. He encourages Alan to run for neighborhood president to change things, but Elaine becomes more interested instead. Things become overly competitive between his parents as they both campaign for the position.
8	8	"The Tell-Tale Cart"	Andy Cadiff	Mark Reisman & Eric Weinberg	March 9, 2011	107	1.48
Alan asks that David take the blame for accidentally hitting Elaine with a golf cart. Elaine stays at Alan's house to recover from her injury.
9	9	"Workin' Man"	Andy Cadiff	Mike Dieffenbach	March 16, 2011	108	1.06
Alan sets David up for four job interviews in one day, and he flunks on all of them. David finally gets a job at Susan's real estate office...with Alan being the one that is actually paying his salary.
10	10	"Secrets and Lies"	Andy Cadiff	Chris Case	March 23, 2011	109	1.21
Alan and Elaine decide not to get each other gifts on their first wedding anniversary after their separation. David finally decides to tell Jessica that he slept with her mother, Susan.

=== Season 2 (2012) ===
Retired at 35 was renewed for a second season of ten episodes, on March 21, 2011. Marissa Jaret Winokur joined the cast as Amy Robbins, David's bubbly sister. The role was previously played by Casey Wilson in the pilot episode. Production on the 10 episodes of season 2 began on November 3, 2011. The new season premiered at 10 PM (EDT) on Tuesday, June 26, 2012. After three episodes aired, TV Land moved the first-run episodes to Wednesdays at 11 PM (EDT).

No. overall	No. in season	Title	Directed by	Written by	Original release date	Prod. code	U.S. viewers (millions)
11	1	"Up North"	Andy Cadiff	Kevin Abbott	June 26, 2012	201	0.60
Elaine appears determined to pursue a one-night stand of her own after catching Alan in bed with Susan. Alan asks David and Amy (Marissa Jaret Winokur) to find out if their mother is following through on her threat, as he's determined to win her back.
12	2	"The Dates"	Shelley Jensen	Nastaran Dibai	July 3, 2012	207	0.53
Alan and Elaine go to couples therapy, and the therapist, Dr. Keller (Robin Givens) suggests that each plan a secret date for the other. David moves in with Amy, after the presence of both his parents in the condo begins to bother him. But Amy soon becomes bothered by David's presence.
13	3	"Poker Face"	Andy Cadiff	Vince Calandra	July 10, 2012	202	0.45
Elaine takes part in Alan's poker games, making him uncomfortable. David begins working for Brandon's pool care business, but hurts Brandon's feelings by saying that he is embarrassed to tell his parents what his real job is. Brandon meets Amy's boyfriend Jared (John Ross Bowie), which stirs up romantic feelings that Brandon has had for Amy since childhood.
14	4	"The Grifters"	Andy Cadiff	Joey Gutierrez	July 18, 2012	203	0.69
David meets a nice girl named Jenn (Danneel Harris) at the grocery store, and lies to her about his career and financial situations. Alan and Elaine become convinced that Jenn is hiding ulterior motives with regards to David. After revealing the truth about his "retirement" to Jenn, David takes a job as a bartender. Amy and Jared agree to move in together, but after Amy gets advice from Alan about the decision, she scares Jared about possible marital commitments.
15	5	"My Dinner with Alan"	David Trainer	Vince Calandra	July 25, 2012	208	0.78
Amy pushes her father to be more friendly toward Jared, but later regrets it when Alan convinces Jared to move his huge massage chair into his and Amy's apartment. Elsewhere, David is annoyed when Alan replaces him with Jared on the community's softball team, even giving David's old uniform to Jared.
16	6	"The Apartment"	Shelley Jensen	Mike Dieffenbach	August 1, 2012	205	0.56
David becomes suspicious of Elaine's motives when he discovers that she hasn't released her old apartment yet. David then enlists Amy's help to uncover other secrets their mother might be hiding. While Jared is away on a business trip in Atlanta, Amy is alone and frequently calls him with no answer back. Brandon finally reveals to Amy his true feelings for her, then kisses her. Meanwhile, Jenn's child and David's lack of his own place cause the two to look for a place to have sex.
17	7	"The Break-Up"	Shelley Jensen	Pat Bullard	August 8, 2012	206	0.65
Amy is confused after getting a surprise kiss from Brandon, making her question her relationship with Jared. Making matters worse, the entire Robbins family gets involved in Amy's love life. Elsewhere, Jenn discovers a phone number that David received from a female bar patron and refused to throw away, causing her to end their relationship.
18	8	"Knocked Up"	Andy Cadiff	Chris Case	August 15, 2012	204	0.66
Following her breakup with Jared, Amy fears she may be pregnant with Jared's child. Amy lets her excited parents share the "happy news" before finally revealing that her pregnancy test was negative.
19	9	"The Proposal"	David Trainer	Chris Case	August 22, 2012	209	0.75
Jared proposes to Amy, leaving Brandon both heartbroken and a little suspicious of Jared's motives when the wedding is scheduled in two weeks. David discovers that Brandon's suspicions have merit.
20	10	"My Best Friend's Wedding"	Andrew Weyman	Story by : Nastaran Dibai; Teleplay by : Pat Bullard & Vince Calandra	August 29, 2012	210	0.82
Amy faces a difficult choice: She discovers that Jared wanted to marry her quickly to get a green card, or else he will be deported to Canada. She asks Brandon for advice, and realizes how much Brandon is in love with her.

== Production ==
=== Development ===
TV Land placed a pilot order on October 26, 2009. The series was created by Chris Case, who also serves as executive producer. Michael Hanel and Mindy Schultheis are executive producers, as well. Retired at 35 was ordered to series by TV Land on April 16, 2010. The series, which is TV Land's second original scripted comedy series, premiered on January 19, 2011, following Hot in Cleveland.

=== Casting ===
Casting announcements began in November 2009, with George Segal as the first actor cast, playing the role of Alan Robbins, David's father, who bonds with his son while showing him the glories of his newfound lifestyle. Johnathan McClain, Josh McDermitt, and Ryan Michelle Bathe were the next actors cast, with McClain playing David Robbins, a successful young businessman who decides to leave New York behind and move into his father's Florida retirement home, McDermitt playing Brandon, David's best friend, and Bathe playing Jessica Sanders, David's love interest. The last series regular cast was Jessica Walter as Elaine Robbins, David's mom and Alan's ex-wife. Segal and Walter had previously teamed on Bye Bye Braverman (1968); the two stars died one day apart on March 23 and 24, 2021 respectively. Marissa Jaret Winokur joined the cast in the second season as Amy Robbins, David's sister, a sharp-tongued, quick-witted, successful saleswoman for a pharmaceutical company with a bubbly personality, a role that was originally played by Casey Wilson in the pilot.

=== Filming ===
The series is filmed in multicamera format in front of a live studio audience.

== Reception ==
=== Ratings ===
Season	Timeslot (ET/PT)	# Ep.	Premiered		Ended		TV Season	Viewers (in millions)
Season	Timeslot (ET/PT)	# Ep.	Date	Premiere Viewers (in millions)	Date	Finale Viewers (in millions)	TV Season	Viewers (in millions)
Season 1	Wednesday 10:30PM	10	January 19, 2011	2.01	March 23, 2011	1.21	2011	1.36
Season 2	Tuesday 10:00PM; Wednesday 11:00PM	10	June 26, 2012	0.60	August 29, 2012	0.82	2012	0.65

== International broadcasting ==
- In Canada, it airs on VisionTV, and streams on Tubi.
- In Italy, it airs on Fox Italy; on MNet in South Africa; and on TV4 in Sweden and Finland.
- In Latin America, it airs con Comedy Central Latin America Sundays at 11.30PM CT
- In The Netherlands, the show was burned off late at night on Dutch network Veronica.
