= Dad Camp =

- Starring: Jeff Gardere
- Country of origin: United States
- No. of seasons: 1
- No. of episodes: 9

Production
- Executive producers: JD Roth; Michael Krupat; Chris Wylde
- Running time: 60 minutes (including commercials)
- Production company: 3Ball Productions

Original release
- Network: VH1
- Release: May 31 – July 28, 2010

Dad Camp is a reality television show on VH1. The show, created by Michael Krupat and Chris Wylde, documents six pregnant couples as they undergo boot camp style group therapy, to help motivate the men to take up the responsibility of fatherhood. At the end of the show, each woman will decide if she wants her partner to stay and help raise the baby, or if she wants sole custody of the child. The couples were: Elliott Miller and Tiffany, Aaron Tyler and Shell, Wes Thompson and Cheryl, Austin Gurley and Candace Hendricks, Donta Young and Briana Stone, and Brian Merrill and Christina Rubert.

== Episodes ==
No.	Title	Original release date
1	"Wake Up Call"	May 31, 2010
2	"Pair of Pants"	June 6, 2010
3	"Sleepless Nights"	June 14, 2010
4	"Breaking The Cycle"	June 21, 2010
5	"Babies, Blowups and a Breakup"	June 30, 2010
6	"Let's Talk About Sex"	July 7, 2010
7	"Unfinished Business"	July 14, 2010
8	"Man Enough"	July 21, 2010
9	"Reunion"	July 28, 2010
