= Dawson Dunbar =

Canadian actor

- Occupation: Actor
- Years active: 2004-present

Dawson Dunbar is a Canadian actor.

Dawson won Best Performance in a Short Film at the 32nd Young Artist Awards for Little Big Kid. He was also nominated at the 31st Young Artist Awards in the same category for his performance in Trolls. In 2012, Dawson won Best Performance in a Short Film for Bred in Captivity at the 33rd Young Artist Awards

He has an older brother called Talon Dunbar, who is also an actor.

Dawson is best known for his performance in the movie Furious 7 where he played a younger version of Paul Walker. He has previously mentioned that the filming process had him miss weeks of high school.

He has frequently collaborated with virtual YouTuber Gawr Gura.

== Filmography ==
Year	Title	Role	Notes Notes
2004	Call Me: The Rise and Fall of Heidi Fleiss	Young Jason	
2004	Dogboy	Orphan	Short Film
2004	Aliens in America	Little Justin	Season 1, Episode 4
2008	The Escape of Conrad Lard-Bottom	Youngest Lard-Bottom	
2008	Supernatural	Simon	Season 3, Episode 14
2008	Men in Trees	Young Boy	Season 2, Episode 18
2009	Trolls	Billy	Nominated for Best Performance in Short Film at Young Artist Awards
2010	Gaia	Kitcha	Short Film
2010	Little Big Kid	Johnny	Won Best Performance in Short Film at Young Artist Awards
2010	Haunt	Young Will	Short Film
2010	Timothy and the World of Tomorrow	Timothy	Short Film
2011	Taken from Me: The Tiffany Rubin Story	Soccer Kid	
2011	Lullaby for a Lunatic	Young Liam	
2011	The Eidolon House	Benjamin	Short Film
2011	Translucent Nature	Young Robert Hill	Short Film
2011	Bred in Captivity	Joey	Short Film
2011	Sunday's Child	Kid #1	Short Film
2011	Dead Friends	Dead Boy	Short Film
2011	Out of Order	Jake	Short Film
2011	Truth	Adam	Feature film; Royal Reel Award at Canada International Film Festival (2013)
2011	Joanna Makes a Friend	Everett	Short Film
2011	Psych	Boy with Nintendo	Season 6, Episode 9
2011	The Long Road	Will	Short Film
2011	A Strange Day in July	Ryan	Short Film
2011	Shooting Flies	Jackit	Short Film
2015	Furious 7	Young Paul Walker	People's Choice Award for Favorite Movie

== Awards ==
Year	Award	Category	Film	Result	Ref.
2010	Young Artist Awards	Best Performance in a Short Film - Young Actor	Trolls	Nominated	
2011	Young Artist Awards	Best Performance in a Short Film - Young Actor Ten and Under	Little Big Kid	Won	
2012	Young Artist Awards	Best Performance in a Short Film - Young Actor Ten and Under	Bred in Captivity	Won	
