= Krista & Becca Ritchie =

- Education: University of Georgia
- Occupation: Writers
- Writing career
- Language: English
- Period: 2013-present
- Genre: Young adult romance
- Website: kbritchie.com

Krista Marie Ritchie and Becca Michelle Ritchie are American authors and sisters. They co-author several new adult and romance novels. Their first joint book, Addicted to You, was published in June 2013.

When she was fourteen years old, Becca independently published a young adult/urban fantasy novel titled Wynter Chelsea: The Legacy with Outskirts Press.

== Bibliography ==
Circus is Family Series (Previously Released as "Aerial Ethereal"):

1. The Failed Audition (Previously released as "Amour Amour") (Circus Is Family #1) (2014)
2. The Secret Ex-Boyfriend (Previously released as "Infini") (Circus is Family #2) (2017)

Addicted Series: While written as two separate series initially, the Addicted and Calloway Sisters series are now grouped together as one series after the series was republished by Berkley Romance in 2024. Readers can read both separately, but for full context of the characters, it is encouraged to read them in the "Addicted" order as listed below.

1. Addicted to You (Addicted #1) (2013)
2. Ricochet (Addicted #2) (2013)
3. Addicted for Now (Addicted #3) (2013)
4. Thrive (Addicted #6) (2014)
5. Addicted After All (Addicted #7) (2014)

Calloway Sisters Series:

1. Kiss the Sky (Calloway Sisters #1, Addicted #4) (2014)
2. Hothouse Flower (Calloway Sisters #2, Addicted #5) (2014)
3. Fuel the Fire (Calloway Sisters #3, Addicted #8) (2015)
4. Long Way Down (Calloway Sisters #4, Addicted #9) (2015)
5. Some Kind of Perfect (Calloway Sisters #5, Addicted #10) (2016)

Bad Reputation Duet: While published later, the Bad Reputation duet is a spin-off duology to the Addicted series, taking place during events and having similar recurring characters. It can be read completely on its own.

1. Whatever It Takes (2020)
2. Wherever You Are (2020)

Like Us Series: The "Like Us" series is another spin-off of the Addicted Series, however, it takes nearly a decade after the end of Some Kind of Perfect (Addicted #10) and follows the lives of the second generation as they wind up relationships with their bodyguards. The series was originally titled the Billionaires and Bodyguards series, but eventually took on the Like Us series name by the second or third book.

1. Damaged Like Us (Like Us #1) (2017)
2. Lovers Like Us (Like Us #2) (2017)
3. Alphas Like Us (Like Us #3) (2018)
4. Tangled Like Us (Like Us #4) (2018)
5. Sinful Like Us (Like Us #5) (2019)
6. Headstrong Like Us (Like Us #6) (2019)
7. Charming Like Us (Like Us #7) (2020)
8. Wild Like Us (Like Us #8) (2020)
9. Fearless Like Us (Like Us #9) (2021)
10. Infamous Like Us (Like Us #10) (2021)
11. Misfits Like Us (Like Us #11) (2022)
12. Unlucky Like Us (Like Us #12) (2023)
13. Nobody Like Us (Like Us #13) (2024)

The Raging Ones Duology: Krista and Becca stated that this series would be revamped for a New Adult audience in the future via their Patreon in June 2025.

1. The Raging Ones (2018)
2. The Last Hope (2019)

Standalone:

1. Love & Other Cursed Things (2021)

Dishonestly Yours Series:

1. Dishonestly Yours (2024)
2. Destructively Mine (2025)
3. Dangerously Ours (2026)

Cobalt Empire Series: Another spin-off to the Addicted series, except follows the lives of the Cobalt Siblings as they live in New York and juggle wealth, power, fame, and love.

1. Burn Bright (2025)
2. Silver Sweet (2026)
3. Loathed Love (2026)
4. Book 4
5. Book 5
6. Book 6
