= The Visitor (Child novel) =

2000 novel by Lee Child

- First edition (UK)
- Author: Lee Child
- Language: English
- Series: Jack Reacher
- Release number: 4
- Genre: Thriller
- Publisher: Bantam Press (United Kingdom); Putnam (United States)
- Publication date: 20 April 2000
- Publication place: United Kingdom
- Media type: Print (hardcover and paperback)
- Pages: 384
- ISBN: 0-593-04399-5
- OCLC: 43050061
- Dewey Decimal: 813.54
- LC Class: PS3553.H4838 R8 2000
- Preceded by: Tripwire
- Followed by: Echo Burning

The Visitor is the fourth book in the Jack Reacher series written by Lee Child. It was published in 2000 by Bantam Press in the United Kingdom. In the United States, the book was released under the title Running Blind. It is written in the second and third person. In the novel, retired Army military police officer Jack Reacher must race against time to catch a sophisticated serial killer who is murdering a group of female soldiers, but leaving no forensic evidence.

== Plot ==
The prologue opens with a mystery person's point of view on knowledge, power and killing: "People say that knowledge is power. The more knowledge, the more power. Suppose you knew the winning numbers for the lottery? You would run to the store. And you would win. Same for the stock market. You're not talking about a trend or a percentage game or a whisper or a tip. You're talking about knowledge. Real, hard knowledge. You would buy. Then later you'd sell, and you'd be rich. Any kind of sports at all, if you could predict the future, you'd be home and dry. Same for anything. Same for killing people."

Jack Reacher beats up two thugs sent to collect protection money from the New York City restaurant in which he has just finished dinner. When he returns home, he is picked up by the FBI and questioned about two women whose cases of sexual harassment he investigated when he was a military policeman in the United States Army. It is revealed both have been murdered in the last few months and a criminal profiling team has come to the conclusion that the person responsible was someone exactly like Reacher. Reacher realizes that he has no alibi for the times and locations that the women were killed and requests a lawyer.

Reacher's girlfriend, lawyer Jodie Garber-Jacob, has him released after further questioning. Jodie returns to work, and Reacher drives to his house in upstate New York that he inherited from Jodie's father. He is soon called upon by two members of the FBI team that previously questioned him. A third woman has been killed who was also an ex-soldier who filed for sexual harassment – albeit in a different timeframe from the first two. The FBI compels Reacher to assist with the investigation by threatening him and, implicitly, Jodie as well.

Reacher and Special Agent Julia Lamarr, the lead profiler on the team, drive to the FBI Academy in Quantico, Virginia, whilst discussing the case. Julia's stepsister, Alison, is a woman with the same particulars as the three victims. Julia reveals the killer's modus operandi, which is killing the victims in an unknown way, with no bruises or injuries, leaving them naked in their bathtub, filled with army-issue camouflage paint.

At Quantico, Reacher meets Agent Lisa Harper, who has been detailed to accompany him wherever he goes. Harper is set up to be a honey trap, but this is easily noticed by Reacher. Despite their mutual attraction, they initially agree to keep it professional. Reacher suggests contacting Colonel John Trent at Fort Dix. While Harper remains outside Trent's office due to security clearance reasons, Trent helps Reacher sneak out the window and arranges a four-hour trip to New York. There, Reacher targets a pair of criminals, rivals of the original thugs, and deliberately instigates a gang war between the rival racketeers. The war results in a crime lord being taken out of the picture, which effectively removes the FBI's leverage over Reacher and Jodie. He returns to New Jersey with Harper, who is none the wiser.

After Alison is murdered, Reacher realizes that the killings are being done to mask a single killing. He and Harper eventually catch the killer—Julia Lamarr herself. She is in the process of killing her fifth victim when Reacher intervenes and unintentionally breaks her neck while incapacitating her. Reacher and Harper come to the conclusion that Lamarr used her expertise in hypnosis to compel the victims to suffocate themselves by swallowing their own tongues, with the aim of gaining a family inheritance meant for Julia. The FBI is unhappy that Reacher has killed one of their agents, but an accord is eventually reached with the whole affair to be kept secret.

Reacher meets up with Jodie, who reveals she has successfully been made a partner at her law firm. However, this position will involve her being in London for a few years. Reacher knows he will not want to go with her since he misses his wandering ways, and the two agree to spend one last month together as although they love each other, their lives have become incompatible.

== Characters ==
- Jack Reacher: The main protagonist, a former military policeman, known for his resourcefulness and capacity for justice.
- Alan Deerfield: Assistant FBI Director, New York Field Office
- Tony Poulton: FBI Special Agent, Quantico
- Julia Lamarr: FBI Special Agent, Quantico, Profiler
- Nelson Blake: FBI Agent-in-Charge, Serial Crimes Unit, Quantico.
- James Cozo: FBI Agent-in-Charge, Organized Crime Unit, New York
- Jodie Garber-Jacob: Reacher's girlfriend, Daughter of General Leon Garber.
- Lisa Harper: FBI Special Agent, Quantico.
- Colonel John Trent: Fort Dix, New Jersey.
- Doctor Stavely: FBI, Senior Pathologist, Quantico.
- Captain John Leighton: Military Policeman Duty Officer, Fort Armstrong, New Jersey.
- Sergeant Bob McGuire: Quartermaster Sergeant, imprisoned for dealing stolen Army weapons.
- Colonel LaSalle Kruger: Commanding Officer, Supply Battalion, former Special Forces and wounded in Desert Storm.
- Alison Lamarr: Julia's stepsister

== Production ==
The Visitor was released in the United Kingdom on 20 April 2000, and the American publication followed on 13 July of the same year.

Putnam, the US publisher, felt that The Visitor sounded too much like a science-fiction novel, and published the book under the title Running Blind.

== Reception ==
The Visitor was well received, with Publishers Weekly saying "the book harbors two elements that separate it from the pack: a brain-teasing puzzle that gets put together piece by fascinating piece, and a central character with Robin Hood-like integrity and an engagingly eccentric approach to life." American book review journal Kirkus Reviews called it "deeply satisfying" and the reader should "plan to stay up long past bedtime and do some serious hyperventilating toward the end." Booklist also offered a good review, saying "This fourth Reacher thriller is easily the best. The plot is a masterpiece."

The Visitor was nominated for the 2001 Barry Award for "Best Hardcover Novel", but ultimately fell short to Deep South by Nevada Barr.

== Awards and nominations ==
- 2001 Barry Award nominee, Best Hardcover Novel.
