= Tripwire (novel) =

1999 novel by Lee Child

- First edition (UK)
- Author: Lee Child
- Language: English
- Series: Jack Reacher
- Release number: 3
- Genre: Thriller
- Publisher: Bantam Press (UK); Putnam (US)
- Publication date: 15 April 1999
- Publication place: United Kingdom
- Media type: Print (hardcover and paperback)
- Pages: 419
- ISBN: 0-593-04393-6
- OCLC: 39763530
- Dewey Decimal: 813/.54
- LC Class: PS3553.H4838 T75 1999
- Preceded by: Die Trying
- Followed by: The Visitor

Tripwire is the third book in the Jack Reacher series written by Lee Child. It was published in 1999 by Putnam in America and Bantam in the United Kingdom. It is written in the third person. In the novel, retired military police officer Jack Reacher becomes embroiled in a mystery involving a Vietnam War veteran who was reported missing in action, but who has resurfaced as a vicious loanshark with a secret he will murder to protect.

== Plot ==
The prologue describes Victor Truman "Hook" Hobie's carefully planned escape route in the event of somebody discovering his "really big, well-guarded secret." His "early-warning system" consists of geographically located tripwires that will warn him that he has been discovered. The first is eleven thousand miles from his home in the United States and the second is six thousand miles out. His response to their activation would be to tie up loose ends, cash in, transfer his assets and disappear without a trace. Over thirty years of quiet success have made him feel somewhat secure. But Hook did not expect both alerts to arrive on the same day.

Elsewhere, Jack Reacher is working two jobs in Key West digging pools with a shovel by day and working as a bouncer at night. He meets a private investigator, Costello, who is looking for him on behalf of a client named a Mrs. Jacob, a name Reacher does not recognize. Later on, while Reacher is working his night job, two suspicious-looking men also make inquiries about his whereabouts. Reacher attempts to follow them and finds Costello murdered on the sidewalk. He flies to New York City to find out why Costello was looking for him and why he was killed for it.

After finding Costello's office seemingly untouched, Reacher's suspicion is aroused by an unsaved document open on the secretary's computer. Searching through the files, he gets the contact information for Mrs. Jacob and arrives in the middle of a funeral for his former commanding officer and mentor, General Leon Garber. Leon's now-adult daughter, Jodie Garber-Jacob, turns out to be Costello's client.

Following Costello's trail, Reacher and Jodie discover that Garber had been investigating the whereabouts of Victor Hobie, a helicopter pilot reported missing in action during the Vietnam War. They discover that Victor's family had been tricked into giving their life savings to a con artist named Rutter, who poses as a fake military liaison to families of missing soldiers. The man claiming to be Victor becomes aware of the investigation and tries to hunt down Reacher and Jodie. After forcing Rutter to return the money he stole, Reacher and Jodie visit the National Personnel Records Center in St. Louis, which leads them to a forensic laboratory in Hawaii that identifies the remains of soldiers.

Victor was reported MIA after his helicopter was shot down. However, it becomes clear that Victor died in the crash, and that another soldier named Carl Allen assumed his identity in order to escape prosecution for fragging a superior officer. Severely burned by the crash, Allen left his own dogtags behind to fool investigators and had his right hand, lost in the helicopter crash, replaced with a hook. Under his new identity, Allen amassed a fortune as an illicit "moneylender", before establishing himself as a legitimate businessman offering high-interest loans to firms unable to borrow from banks. However, his real objective is to seize control of their assets, using threats and torture to force his clients to agree to his terms.

Despite being aware that Reacher's investigation could expose his crimes, Allen decides to complete one final job: the takeover of a bankrupt multimillion-dollar company owned by Chester and Marilyn Stone. Allen and his men take the couple hostage, but Marilyn is able to stall them before Chester signs over the company. Jodie is called back to New York by her law firm to handle the Stone deal but ends up being captured by Allen along with another private investigator posing as the Stones' lawyer, forcing Reacher to come to her rescue. Reacher kills Allen and his men but sustains a seemingly fatal bullet wound to his chest. At the hospital, however, a doctor discovers that, due to the arduous physical labor that was required for his job manually digging pools, his pectoral muscle was so thick the bullet did not make it past his rib cage. Reacher is then visited while convalescing by the Hobie family to thank him for restoring their son's good name.

== Characters ==
- Jack Reacher: The main protagonist, a former military policeman, known for his resourcefulness and capacity for justice.
- Costello: Private Detective from New York hired by Jodie Garber.
- Leon Garber: Reacher's former Colonel and father figure.
- Jodie Garber-Jacob: Daughter of Leon Garber.
- Tom Hobie: Elderly father of the real Victor Hobie.
- Mary Hobie: Elderly mother of the real Victor Hobie.
- Victor Hobie: Son of Tom and Mary, was killed in a helicopter crash during the Vietnam War.
- Carl Allen: Former soldier who steals Victor Hobie's identity.
- Chester Stone: Owner and CEO of a large company that is in financial trouble.
- Marilyn Stone: Wife of Chester.
- Sheryl: A realtor who is taken captive along with Marilyn
- William Curry: A private investigator who works for the Stones

== Continuation ==
The bullet wound that Reacher received is mentioned a few times in other Lee Child novels. Most of the women that Reacher sleeps with notice the "crater" and usually place their pinkie there while asking how it happened. In One Shot Reacher sums up the story by saying it was a wound received by a "Mad Man" and that most women are curious about it except for the one whom he was saving at the time.

== Production ==
Lee Child began writing Tripwire in spring 1997. The book was published on 15 June 1999 in the United Kingdom and the American publication followed on 28 June of the same year.

The reason for the opening of the book taking place in Key West was a vacation Child spent there in 1996.

The provisional title for Tripwire was The Hook, but that name was scrapped as Putnam believed the title was not "punchy" enough. Putnam also believed The Hook would remind people too much of Peter Pan.

== Reception ==
Tripwire received positive reviews from critics, with The Orlando Sentinel calling it "a thriller good to the last drop" and The Arizona Daily Star saying "Lee Child can write. [...] Child grabs hold with the first page and won't let go until the finish. This is pulse-pounding suspense, and Child hardly misses a beat." The book was also praised by fellow authors, with Michael Connelly saying "It's a tightly-drawn and swift thriller that gives new meaning to what a page-turner should be." Stephen White also commented, calling Tripwire a "stylish thriller."
