= Die Trying (novel) =

1998 novel by Lee Child

- First edition (UK)
- Author: Lee Child
- Language: English
- Series: Jack Reacher
- Release number: 2
- Genre: Thriller
- Publisher: Bantam Press (United Kingdom); Putnam (United States)
- Publication date: 2 July 1998
- Publication place: United Kingdom
- Media type: Print (hardcover and paperback)
- Pages: 411
- ISBN: 0-593-04144-5
- OCLC: 37546904
- Dewey Decimal: 813/.54 21
- LC Class: PS3553.H4838 D54 1998
- Preceded by: Killing Floor
- Followed by: Tripwire

Die Trying is the second novel in the Jack Reacher series written by Lee Child. It was published in 1998 by Bantam Press in the UK and by Putnam in the US. It is written in the third person.

== Plot ==
In Chicago, Jack Reacher is helping out a young woman with an injured leg with her dry cleaning when they are captured at gunpoint by three men and thrown into a car, then transferred into a van and driven cross-country. On the way, Reacher learns the woman is an FBI agent named Holly Johnson, though she does not tell him she is the daughter of the Chairman of the Joint Chiefs of Staff and goddaughter of the President, having been accused of being the beneficiary of nepotism all her life.

Meanwhile, Holly's fellow agents search for her. Security footage leaves Reacher as the prime suspect, and his mentor, General Leon Garber, is brought in to help, though he insists Reacher would never do such a thing. The Chicago field office where Holly worked takes charge, with only Agent-in-Charge Paul "Mack" McGrath and two others, Milosevic and Brogan, involved. At one point, they manage to put an APB out on the van, but get the wrong van due to a transfer of vehicles.

After Reacher fails to take advantage of an opportunity to escape during the night, Holly insists that he let her handle things. However, she ends up owing him when, during another stay, one of the kidnappers, Peter Bell, tries to rape her. Reacher breaks free of his restraints, kills Bell, hides his body and re-restrains himself before the others become suspicious. Holly finally and reluctantly accepts his help.

Reacher and Holly finally arrive at their destination: a mountain community that's home to a radical militia wishing to secede from the United States. Holly, intended by leader Beau Borken to be used as leverage to make her father agree to his demands, is placed in an upstairs room of an abandoned county courthouse, the walls of which are supposedly filled with dynamite. She meets Jackson, an FBI agent working undercover; he offers to help her escape, but she refuses to leave without Reacher.

When word reaches Borken of Bell's murder, Reacher is put on trial. Learning that he will be executed, Holly escapes her room by killing the guard and taking his rifle. She confronts Borken, only to find herself facing the entire militia. Borken urges his followers to not fire on her, knowing he will lose his leverage if she dies. When Holly threatens to kill herself if Reacher dies, Borken is forced to commute his sentence. Instead, Reacher begins five years of hard labor.

As punishment, Reacher and Holly are forced to bury Jackson, who Borken had previously crucified; Meanwhile, the FBI discovers the location of the militia. When the President, fearing political fallout from a bloodbath, refuses to authorize an attack, McGrath and his men go rogue, setting up camp near the compound. That night, Reacher sneaks out of his cabin and into an abandoned mine, where he finds trucks carrying missiles.

The next morning, as he returns to the compound, Reacher rescues McGrath, who was caught trying to break into the camp, thus proving his innocence in Holly's kidnapping. The two realize that either Brogan or Milosevic is a mole working for Borken in exchange for money. They stalk the compound to save Holly, exposing and killing Brogan in the process. Borken drags Holly outside and tries to force her father, who is watching through a spy plane camera feed, to give in to his demands. With a sniper rifle stolen from the ammo cabin, Reacher shoots him dead. Milosevic reveals himself as a second mole and takes Holly hostage, but Holly manages to kill him.

As the FBI round up the remaining militia members and demolish the compound, Reacher discovers that Holly's cabin is not actually filled with dynamite and realizes that Borken sent Stevie, the last surviving kidnapper, to San Francisco to detonate it in the middle of a Fourth of July celebration. Everyone gets in a helicopter; Reacher manages to shoot and destroy the truck on time. Learning that Holly and McGrath have feelings for each other, Reacher sadly says goodbye to her and is left to hitchhike down a highway.

== Characters ==
- Jack Reacher: The main protagonist, a former military policeman, known for his resourcefulness and capacity for justice.
- Nathan Rubin: Chicago Dentist
- Holly Johnson: FBI Agent working in the Chicago Field Office.
- Tony Loder: Leader of the three-man militia team that kidnaps Reacher and Holly Johnson.
- Stevie Stewart: Member of the militia team that kidnaps Reacher and Holly Johnson.
- Peter Wayne Bell: Driver of the van and a member of the militia team that kidnaps Reacher and Holly Johnson.
- Agent Paul "Mack" McGrath: Agent-in-charge of the Chicago FBI Field Office.
- Agent Milosevic: FBI Agent working in the Chicago Field Office.
- Agent Brogan: FBI Agent working in the Chicago Field Office.
- Beau Borken: Commander of the Montana Militia.
- Agent Jackson: FBI Agent working undercover inside the Montana Militia.
- Joseph "Joe" Ray: Guard
- Odell Fowler: Second-in-command of the Montana Militia.
- General Johnson: Chairman of the Joint Chiefs of Staff, Holly's father
- Harland Webster: Director of the FBI
- General Leon Garber: Reacher's former commanding Officer.

Child is a fan of Aston Villa; the naming of the fictional characters, FBI agents McGrath and Milosevic are references to players Paul McGrath and Savo Milošević.

== Unproduced adaptation ==
In September 2026, Alan Ritchson revealed that the fifth season of Reacher was going to adapt Die Trying but that changed after the re-election of Donald Trump in the 2024 United States presidential election.

== Awards and nominations ==
- 1999 WH Smith Thumping Good Read Award winner.

== See also ==
- Northwest Territorial Imperative
