= List of novels by Lincoln Child =

The American author Lincoln Child has released a number of novels and works.

== Stand-alone novels ==
=== Utopia (2002) ===
Utopia
- Author: Lincoln Child
- Genre: Thriller
- Publisher: Doubleday
- Publication date: December 2, 2002
- Publication place: United States
- Media type: Print (paperback)
- Pages: 464
- ISBN: 0-385-50668-6
- OCLC: 48706520

Utopia is the first solo novel by Lincoln Child, published in 2002. It is set in a futuristic amusement park called Utopia, a park that relies heavily on holographics and robotics. Dr. Andrew Warne, the man who designed the program that runs the park's robots, is called in to help fix a problem. But when he gets there, he finds out that the park is being held hostage by a mysterious man known as John Doe.

Utopia consists of five "Worlds", each modeled after different time eras.

- The Nexus: A neutral setting between the Worlds.
- Gaslight: Based on Victorian London.
- Camelot: A medieval kingdom.
- Boardwalk: A reproduction of a sea side amusement park.
- Callisto: A futuristic spaceport above Jupiter's sixth moon.
- Atlantis: A water park based on the lost continent of Atlantis (in the novel, Atlantis is still under construction, and is seen in the epilogue).

A review in Publishers Weekly criticized the "Sluggish prose and overload of technical detail", but admired the book's conclusion as properly thrilling. One blogger called it a "page turner¨ and another blogger admired Child keeping it suspenseful as to which characters would survive and which would perish.

=== Death Match (2004) ===
Death Match
- Author: Lincoln Child
- Genre: Thriller
- Publisher: Doubleday
- Publication date: 2004
- Publication place: United States
- Media type: Print (paperback)
- Pages: 416
- ISBN: 0-307-27556-6
- OCLC: 74831115

Death Match is a 2004 horror novel by Lincoln Child. It is his second solo novel. It is a techno-horror look at electronic matchmaking where for a substantial sum of money, the computer will locate a 'perfect match' for anyone. However, these most perfect of matches ('supercouples, 100% compatibility, etc.) suddenly start seeing mysterious tragedy. The plot begins with a "supercouple" found dead in their Arizona home, in an apparent double suicide.

== Jeremy Logan series ==
=== Deep Storm (2007) ===
Deep Storm
- First Edition
- Author: Lincoln Child
- Series: Jeremy Logan
- Genre: Thriller, Science fiction
- Published: 30 January 2007
- Publisher: Doubleday
- Publication place: United States
- Media type: Print (Hardcover, Softcover)
- Pages: 384
- ISBN: 978-0-385-51550-4
- OCLC: 70219907

Deep Storm is the third solo novel by American author Lincoln Child, published on January 30, 2007. This is the first of Child's novels to introduce Dr. Jeremy Logan, the protagonist of Child's solo works.

In the prologue, three workers – Kevin Lindengood, Fred Hicks, and John Wherry – are operating the rig on the Storm King oil rig in the North Atlantic, off the coast of Greenland. When the equipment begins malfunctioning, Wherry orders everything to be shut down. However, even after Lindengood shuts off the electromagnet, a series of strange signals are still being transmitted to their devices.

Twenty months later, Former naval doctor Peter Crane is sent to investigate a mysterious illness that has broken out on the rig. He meets Dr. Howard Asher, who hints at a fantastic secret being discovered. Government officials transport him to a massive, 12-level facility run by the United States military. He receives a confidential envelope that explains how the military has discovered Atlantis. As he is brought down into the facility, codenamed Deep Storm, he discovers that nearly a quarter of the staff have been acting strangely within the last few weeks. Working alongside the psychiatrist Dr. Roger Corbett and the chief military doctor Michele Bishop, Crane is witness to one of these incidents; a worker named Randall Waite suddenly grabs a hostage after screaming about "voices" in his head, then eventually stabs himself in the neck with a screwdriver. After interviewing some of the patients there, and finding many of the symptoms including sleeplessness, lack of focus, nausea, and psychological effects such as changes in personality, Crane realizes that there must be some kind of unifying basis to all of them.

Meanwhile, Asher talks with the military commander in charge of Deep Storm, Admiral Spartan, and his second-in-command, Commander Terrence Korolis. Asher thinks that Crane should have the right to go down to the “classified” levels, levels 6 through 1, to investigate the cause of the sickness, After this, the base is set on alert after a pinhole breach in one of the corridors. The officers determine it was an act of sabotage and Asher reminds all of the heads of departments to be vigilant, while Korolis brings in a team of black ops soldiers, who answer directly to him rather than Spartan, to reinforce security. Asher also shows Crane several "sentinels" that they have found: cube-shaped objects with a texture that seems to consist of every color known to man, and emit thin beams of light straight up, and gravitate to the center of any room or container they are kept in. Asher tells him that this is actually not a solid beam of light, but a pulse sending out a mini signal in binary code. He further goes on to say that he hired his personal cryptographer, Joseph Marris, to analyze this binary code since he believes that this technology is not meant for humans. Admiral Spartan and his forces come in at this instant and, much to Crane's surprise, give him clearance to visit the entire facility. Crane goes down and meets Hui Ping, a doctor who is also trying to analyze the beams of light. Ping and Crane also agree to leave no stone unturned and check for any kind of similarity all the patients may have.

Meanwhile, back on the mainland, Lindengood gets in contact with a man named Wallace, who represents a shadowy organization that has taken a great interest in the discovery after Lindengood provides them with certain information. However, unbeknownst to him, they plan to simply destroy whatever is down there. When Lindengood demands an increased pay for his information, Wallace kills him and flees to Storm King, working undercover as a crew member and regularly shipping supplies to a fellow insider on Deep Storm.

A few days later, Asher reaches a breakthrough with the binomial code, and realizes that it is a mathematical expression: 1 divided by 0. A while later, after Crane mistakenly handles a sentinel with his bare hand, Asher excitedly describes how the sentinel's broadcasts are now more clear, and they can now analyze messages on the infra-red spectrum, radioactive spectrum, and any other kind of measuring device know to man. However, during this exchange, Peter notices how Asher has a very pale complexion and bruising along his arm. He requests that Asher go to medical, but Asher disagrees, saying that he could spend time in the Hyperbaric chamber as a way to alleviate his illness for a short time, just until they decode the rest of the messages coming from the sentinel. At this point, Crane runs a brain scan on all of the patients and discovers that they all do have something in common; all of their brain waves spike in formation, even their theta waves. He realizes that this is another signal coming from the source. He also realizes the implications, that whoever made this technology is much more powerful than humans. He is about to tell Asher of his discovery when Asher phones him saying that he decoded all of the messages. However, upon his arrival at the Hyperbaric chamber, the saboteur has struck again, burning the Hyperbaric chamber with Asher and Marris both inside. Asher is nearly dead but manages to say one word to Crane before he dies: Whip. Along with Ping, Crane does not realize what this means, but then figures out that they could possibly salvage the hard drive and look at the decoded messages from Asher's laptop. However, Commander Korolis records the conversation and hurriedly runs a degaussing magnet over the hard drive, erasing it. He notices how Asher did not want to continue with the digging, and assumes that whatever is on the hard drive is not relevant and would halt America from recovering possibly beneficial technology.

Korolis subsequently frames Ping as the saboteur, forcing Crane and Ping into hiding as they decipher Asher's hard drive. They go to a deserted physics lab and realize that the hard drive was magnetized. Despite this, Ping manages to resurrect the data using a crude form of magnetic force microscopy, and as they peer onto the screen they realize that the other messages included $a^3+b^3=c^3$, π=a/b and $x=0^0$, other impossible mathematical equations. Because humans place passive and active ways to warn people of the danger of such stored weapons, Crane assumes aliens think the same way and the sentinels are actually a message warning advanced civilizations to stay off earth. This deciphers the mathematical expressions because the "forbidden" mathematical maneuvers are the only way aliens can communicate with other more sophisticated races.

Crane leaves Ping and goes to warn Spartan of this danger. Spartan initially does not seem to take the hint, and still believes that there is beneficial technology there. Frustrated, Crane goes to Dr. Bishop and asks her to organize the other heads of departments into believing him. Bishop promises to call him back but is discovered by Dr. Corbett an hour later in the Environmental Control section, wiring C-4 into the facility's wall. Corbett secretly switches on his phone, dials his intern, and confronts Bishop. She does not deny it, instead revealing that she is a radical with anti-American ideals, and how she believes that America has no right to take this technology. She shoots him with a silenced pistol and quickly leaves at the sound of approaching voices. Corbett is barely alive, and starts to disable the C4, but Bishop re-enters the room and finds him. In his panic, he accidentally activates the fourth and final detonator, killing himself and Bishop and blowing open the facility wall. The resulting leak floods all of level 8 and half of level 7.

Meanwhile, Spartan tells Korolis about how Crane's advice does make sense, and he is going to call for an investigation before starting the drilling again. Korolis, determined to acquire the technology no matter what, and believing that Spartan has become infected with the disease, knocks Spartan unconscious, locks him in his quarters, and assumes command.

Crane and Ping meet with Dr. Gene Vanderbilt, the ranking science officer of levels 8 through 12, and he orders a mass evacuation of all personnel on levels 9 through 12, as those on level 8 and below (including Korolis) are stranded by the flood. They round up all 112 people on the higher levels and begin the evacuation process. A single black ops soldier arrives at the ladder to the escape pod as the group begins to escape, and he orders them to return to their stations. A wounded Spartan then appears and guns the soldier down, ordering everyone to evacuate while he stays behind to fend off any other approaching soldiers. He gives Crane the card of his contact in Washington, simply named McPherson, and tells Crane to tell McPherson everything. During this time, Ping manages to decode another of the warnings which suggests that uncovering the weapons could destroy the Solar System. The survivors manage to launch the escape pod shortly before Korolis and his men discover a fantastic weapons cache of stable orbiting black holes. Before they can investigate further, a blast that is presumed to be one of the active countermeasures is fired, consuming the drill team and Deep Storm.

In the epilogue several months later, a small salvaging operation of various wreckage from Deep Storm is underway, and the other insider from the Storm King platform, Wallace, has been arrested. Crane and Ping have met up with McPherson, and Crane tells McPherson the entire story. They listen to a recorded tape of Korolis before his death, and agree not to tell anyone of this discovery, as no one was meant to access such powerful weapons. Crane reasons that whoever put the sentinels there were also cautious enough to provide obvious warning signals, as evident by the impossible mathematic equations. However, McPherson raises two disturbing points: The aliens more than likely consider humans to be negligible due to their primitive technology, hence the violent placing of the devices in the earth as recounted by Albarn 600 years ago; and also that humans at least deactivate weapons before storing them, but because the aliens did not attempt this at all, McPherson thinks that this is not a waste dump at all; it is an active storage facility of weapons for future use.

=== Terminal Freeze (2009) ===
Terminal Freeze
- Hardcover edition
- Author: Lincoln Child
- Series: Jeremy Logan
- Genre: Thriller, Science fiction
- Publisher: Random House
- Publication date: January 27, 2009
- Publication place: United States
- Media type: Print (hardcover)
- Pages: 576
- ISBN: 978-0-7393-2826-2
- OCLC: 227929898

Terminal Freeze is the fourth solo novel by Lincoln Child. The novel was released on February 24, 2009, by Random House. It is the second novel in the Jeremy Logan series.

The events take place in Alaska, north of the Arctic Circle. A decommissioned military base located near the fictional Mount Fear, the Mount Fear Remote Sensing Installation, is being used by a research team from Northern Massachusetts University to study the effects of global warming on a receding glacier. The team consists of five scientists from the university - Evan Marshall, a paleoecologist; Gerard Sully, a climatologist and the team leader; Wright Faraday, an evolutionary biologist; Ang Chen, a graduate student; and Penny Barbour, a computer scientist - along with the skeleton crew of four soldiers - Corporal Marcelin, Privates First Class Tad Phillips and Donovan Fluke, and the leader, Sergeant Paul Gonzalez.

The expedition discovers a monstrous ancient animal, presumed to be a preserved example of Smilodon populator, frozen in solid ice inside a lava tube made into an ice cave. The expedition's corporate sponsors, Terra Prime and its parent corporation Blackpool Entertainment, sense huge publicity and decide to have the beast cut from the ice, thawed, and revealed live on television. A massive entourage is sent to the base to begin production of the documentary, and the new crew includes Kari Ekberg, the field producer; Emilio Conti, the eccentric director (along with his assistant Hulce); Allan Fortnum, the director of photography; Ken Toussaint, the assistant director of photography; Wolff, the network liaison and channel representative; George Creel, the production foreman; and Ashleigh Davis, the spoiled host and star of the show (along with her assistant Brianna). The group is later joined by the truck driver Carradine, who brings Davis' luxurious trailer to the site, and a man who hitched a ride with Carradine, named Dr. Jeremy Logan, a private investigator and Yale professor of medieval history.

Meanwhile, local Tunit people, led by their chief Usuguk, try to warn the scientists that they do not understand what they have found. Specific warnings are that the entire mountain it was found in is a place of evil, the creature exists only for the sole purpose of killing, and that the Tunit do not believe it is dead. In addition, after a reexamination of the creature by Marshall, Faraday, and Barbour, it is revealed that the creature is not a Smilodon at all, but a new, unknown animal entirely, which may be up to 16 feet in length. However, Conti and Wolff are determined to move forward with the production, up until the creature suddenly vanishes from the vault it is being stored in. Although they initially believe it to be stolen, analysis of the hole in the vault floor by Faraday reveals that the incisions in the wood were made from the inside, and appear to be made by something more natural than a tool. Meanwhile, Logan reveals to Marshall that he is investigating the base itself after uncovering recently declassified government documents, detailing an incident at the base in 1958 that resulted in the deaths of 7 of the 8 scientists there. The incident, however, was forgotten when the officer reporting it, Colonel H.N. Rose, died in a plane crash with the full, detailed report.

When a production assistant named Josh Peters, Davis, and Fluke are all suddenly and brutally killed, along with Toussaint and Brianna being wounded, Gonzalez decides that the base has to be evacuated immediately. Carradine offers to transport everyone in his semi's trailer, and although Wolff initially objects, Gonzalez overrides him and agrees. Everyone boards the trailer and flees, leaving behind only the three remaining soldiers, Marshall, Logan, Ekberg, Sully, Conti, Wolff, Faraday, and Creel. After Logan investigates the abandoned quarters of the base's previous science team, he discovers a small journal left behind and hidden in a crawlspace by one of the former occupants, which, among other things, says that the Tunit have the answer to whatever it was that killed the team. Marshall decides to take the Sno-Cat and travel to the Tunit village, only to find that all of the Tunit have fled for the shoreline, leaving behind only the elderly shaman Usuguk. After Marshall's pleas for help and information about the monster, Usuguk reveals that he was the sole survivor of the crew of '58, and agrees to go back to the base with Marshall. Once they return, Usuguk explains the full story, and how the crew of the base discovered a similar creature similarly encased in ice, cut it out, and brought it back to the base. Usuguk calls it the kurrshuq (the "Fang of the Gods" and the "Devourer of Souls"), a local legend among the Tunit people for generations, and shocks everyone by explaining that the creature, upon thawing out and coming alive, was actually quiet friendly and playful. However, only after one scientist attempted to study its hunting habits by playing recordings of animal screams, did the creature suddenly turn violent and kill all except Usuguk. He then reveals one final, chilling detail: The kurrshuq that killed the team in 1958, before it also suddenly died and its body vanished, was no bigger than an Arctic fox; far smaller than this creature.

Meanwhile, the three soldiers and Creel (who volunteered to stay behind due to his hunting and military experience) all begin searching the base for the creature. Once they finally encounter it, it kills Creel and Marcelin while Gonzalez and Phillips return to the life sciences lab where the others are hiding. With Faraday's research of the blood found inside the vault, they realize that the creature has extremely advanced white blood cells that rapidly heal all wounds, and also contain the same compounds as PCP, thus giving the creature enormous and enduring strength. Marshall then speculates, after comparing all of the victims and the unusually distinct shape of the creature's ears, that the kurrshuq has extremely sensitive, sonar-like hearing, like a bat. He claims that, as Usuguk described and Toussaint himself raved about after being attacked, the creature likes to play with people rather than deliberately kill them, as none of its victims were actually eaten like a usual carnivore. Thus, the reason that all were killed except for Toussaint was because they screamed upon seeing the creature, and it killed them in order to stop the noise, just as the original kurrshuq did in 1958. Using this information, Marshall and Sully begin to construct a machine out of sonar technology to emit loud sounds that might be enough to ward off the creature. When Ekberg radios in for help after the monster kills Conti and Wolff (as the three had left on their own in a final attempt to film the creature), Marshall leaves to bring her back, and both return just as the monster appears. Sully tries several different frequencies of sound on the creature, with the final kind - the sine waves - causing the creature noticeable pain. However, the creature kills Sully and briefly stops the machine. Marshall, realizing that it was finally working, starts dragging the machine into a large echo chamber in order to amplify the sounds even greater. Marshall, Logan, and Usuguk lure the creature in, and Marshall turns up the sine waves even louder, causing the creature to collapse and writhe in agony before its head explodes.

In the epilogue, as the remaining crew members - Marshall, Logan, Ekberg, Faraday, Gonzalez, and Phillips - are being evacuated, the scientists are still baffled by the nature of the creature, as its corpse had suddenly disappeared after it supposedly died. After Usuguk leaves, Marshall speculates that perhaps the theory Usuguk had been insisting all along was true; that the creature was a creation of the spirits that rule this land according to Tunit culture, and that both the new kurrshuq and the older one had left the physical world for the spirit world, as Usuguk claimed they did. Logan cryptically mentions how he once lost a pet dachshund while on a family trip, implying that he believes the creature was left behind by extraterrestrial visitors. A budding relationship between Marshall and Ekberg is hinted at, and Logan bids them farewell, saying that he's gotten a call from his private investigation office about another interesting case.

The setting and story of the book is very similar to the novella Who Goes There?, featuring an arctic setting where a group of scientists uncover and thaw out a mysterious creature in the ice, which then breaks free and runs amuck. Tunit was the name assigned to the Dorset people in Greenland by the early Thule proto-Inuit. The last Dorset survivors died in 1902 and no Dorset People ever lived in Alaska, being resident in eastern Canada and Greenland.

=== The Third Gate (2012) ===
The Third Gate
- Hardcover 1st edition
- Author: Lincoln Child
- Series: Jeremy Logan
- Genre: Thriller
- Publisher: Doubleday
- Publication date: June 12, 2012
- Publication place: United States
- Media type: Print, e-book, audiobook
- Pages: 320
- ISBN: 978-0385531382

The Third Gate is the fifth solo novel by American writer Lincoln Child. The novel was released on June 12, 2012, by Doubleday. The book is also the third installment in the Jeremy Logan series.

Shortly after the events of Terminal Freeze, Dr. Jeremy Logan is contacted by an old colleague named Dr. Ethan Rush, who invites him on an expedition into the Sudd in southern Egypt. The expedition, led by famed archaeologist Dr. Porter Stone, seeks to finally locate and excavate the long-lost tomb of the ancient Egyptian pharaoh Narmer, located at the bottom of the swamp. Other members of the expedition include the head of security Frank Valentino, technician Cory Landau, archaeologist Tina Romero, and mechanic Frank Kowinsky. Also accompanying the expedition is Rush's wife Jennifer, who has been maintaining a special connection to "the other side" after a near-death experience where she technically died in a car crash, but was revived by her husband. Rush uses his special method of hypnosis to put Jennifer into a lucid state through which they can communicate with the spirits within the tomb below them, which they believe to be that of Narmer himself. The base of operations is a massive group of canvas-covered outposts floating in the middle of the Sudd, simply referred to as "The Station."

Once they finally manage to create a passageway down to the tomb entrance—nicknamed the Umbilical Cord—they slowly begin excavation through the first two chambers, known as the Gates, with the Third Gate containing the tomb of Narmer himself, while the first two Gates contain rooms full of treasure. However, when Romero studies the mummified remains within the Third Gate, she realizes that the remains are of a female body. Logan similarly draws a conclusion based on the mannerisms Jennifer displayed whenever possessed by the spirit, and deduces that it has to be a female spirit inhabiting her during the sessions, not that of a man. Thus, they realize that Narmer's queen, Niethotep, must have killed Narmer by poisoning him and taking his place in the tomb.

Shortly after this discovery, Jennifer is fully possessed by the spirit of Niethotep once more, which then sabotages the ventilation system on the base and starts a fire in the engine room. She then takes two cylinders of nitroglycerin and uses one to damage the Umbilical Cord, killing Kowinsky, while holding the second one in her hand to keep everyone at bay. Valentino orders an evacuation of the Station, with most personnel taking as much treasure with them as possible, and escapes in one of the rafts along with Stone, Romero, and Landau. Logan and Rush stay behind to try to bring back Jennifer Rush and cast out the evil spirit of Niethotep, but they are unsuccessful in doing so; Niethotep throws the final canister of nitroglycerin down between her and Rush, creating an explosion that kills both of them while narrowly sparing Logan. Logan grabs a handful of treasure and escapes on one of the final rafts before the base explodes and sinks into the Sudd.

A review by Anthony Schultz praised the introductory chapter, but felt the middle of the novel was disappointing, with too much fruitless investigation by Logan before the answers start finally being revealed toward the very end of the book. He also thought the characters were "flat and shallow", and even the better characters weren't fleshed out properly, with too many loose ends.

=== The Forgotten Room (2015) ===
The book begins with Dr. Logan describing to an audience how he has methodically searched Loch Ness and found no evidence of the famous creature of lore. However, the truth is that he has pictures of the Monster: but he will destroy them to keep the secret.

Jeremy is invited to Lux, a preeminent think tank in Newport, RI. He had previously been a researcher there, 10 years earlier, for six months before being asked to leave. Some members of the board felt that his specialty, enigmatology, lacked the scientific rigor associated with other research at Lux.

Dr. Willard Strachey, after beginning to act strangely, kills himself by decapitation using a heavy window. He had been a happy, content man, with everything to live for, before his personality changed. He had been engaged in a renovation of the West Wing of Lux, which had been closed for many years.

As Logan investigates, he meets the other Lux researchers and administrators. Gregory Olafson is the director, and friendly to Logan. Perry Maynard is the vice president, and more of a bureaucrat. Logan is not sure whether Maynard is on his side or not. Roger Carbon, on the other hand, is one of Logan’s chief detractors. He pushed for his removal 10 years ago, and doesn’t seem any friendlier now.

Logan hears the story of the Lady’s Walk, which is a very long hallway where Ernestine Devereaux, wife of the original owner of Dark Gables (which became the home of Lux) once saw a vision of her dead son. She would wander up and down the hallway, hoping to see her son again. After two years, and no sightings, she walked into the Atlantic.

As Logan sits in Strachey’s quarters, trying to get a feel for the space and the man, he begins to hear music. In all of his investigations, while he’s gotten emotional impressions and memories, he’s never before heard music. He then is able to smell burning flesh: it’s almost as if it’s part of the music. This disturbs him greatly.

Kimberly Mykolos was Dr. Strachey’s assistant. Her specialty is strategic software design, which is used to help make software harder to reverse engineer. She worked closely with Strachey, and they got along well. She mentioned that he was happy to do the design work on the West wing.

Logan then interviews the site manager for Lux, Ian Albright. He finds out that just before Strachey’s behavior changed, he stopped work on the restoration and sent all of the workers packing. Logan locates the forgotten room, in the West Wing, at the location where Strachey stopped the work. He finds a big table in the center of the room, but no entrances or exits. He again meditates, and again hears the music and is very disturbed by what he feels in the room.

He wanders around the basement where he encounters a locked door that says it contains research laboratories and is only available for people with authorized access. He goes around to the other side of these laboratories, where he encounters a woman whom he asks for access to Lux’s early files. She allows him to peruse the stacks, but at the end of the room, he encounters an armed guard—guarding the same research laboratories he saw before, from the other end of the room. The guard says that he would need Level A access to enter this space.

Logan then goes to talk with Olafson. He mentions that there is a paucity of records for the time frame between 1930 and 1935. He guesses that there was a project that was studying ectoplasm, and that the records from this project were removed. He also asks about Level A access. Olafson mentions that access is for active research, but only for those who request it. Strachey, being more open, did not require this level of access for his research. Olafson does give Jeremy the list of the other researchers that had odd encounters at the same time as Strachey.

Logan meets the great-granddaughter of the original architect, Pamela Flood. At first, she is rude to Jeremy. But a bit later, she apologizes. A man had come around six months previously and demanded she show him the original blueprints. She agrees to bring the blueprints with her to Lux.

On his way back, an SUV tries to run Logan off the road and down a cliff. He barely is able to stay on the road and make it back to Lux. There, he tells Olafson that he has completed the first phase of his investigation.

Going forward, he is going to concentrate on the Forgotten room, and he wants to bring in Mykolos, Strachey’s assistant, to help him “reverse engineer“ the room.

A resident of Lux contacts an operative named Abrams. Abrams was responsible for trying to kill Logan with his SUV. The mysterious Lux person says they will take care of him. If Abrams disagrees, they threaten to take the item elsewhere. Also, they hint that what happened to Strachey wasn’t an accident.

The machine in the forgotten room is turned on, and another Lux resident, Wilcox, goes crazy, burning and nearly killing himself. Jeremy meets Pamela at a local fish restaurant where she tells him that Deleveaux ordered the secret room to be built. He dictated its location and other details, but Pamela’s great-grandfather never found out what the room was for, nor its purpose.

They discover the entrance to the room: from above. There is a spiral staircase, hidden in a fake stone column, which descends into the back of the Forgotten Room. Jeremy then realizes that, while the room itself is spotless, the access room above has been used recently: people have come into the room, and removed books and journals and probably used the machine.

After this, Olafson tells Jeremy that, indeed, there was secret work going on there in the 1930’s. But it was determined that the work could be used to harm humanity. Thus, according to the Lux charter, work had to be stopped. But not permanently: it was decided that in 100 years time (2035), the work would be reevaluated to see if technology had advanced enough to ensure the secret work would be safe.

Olafson has a folder in his safe that is meant to be opened in 2035, when the decision can be made on whether to resume the work. However, when Logan asks him to open that folder, he refuses. Olafson says that he’s already broken his oath to the previous president just by telling Logan these details. He won’t betray the Lux charter by opening the folder early, or in front of Logan.

Just as Pamela Flood prepares for her date with Jeremy, an intruder sets fire to her house and uses chloroform on her. She dies in her house as it burns to the ground. She had found the business card of the person who came to her months earlier asking to see the blueprints for Dark Gables.

Jeremy then confronts Olafson again, and is shown the dossier for the research. It gives an outline of the research, and some other details. But all of the important research information was in the room itself, and has been removed.

Jeremy is able to track down one of the original scientists: he’s 98 years old and living in a facility. He is in a wheelchair and needs oxygen, but his mind is still sharp. He tells Logan about the research. He first describes infrasound, or low frequency sound (below 20 Hz). At that frequency, the sound emitted can make many people feel disquiet and dread. However, their experiments were with ultrasound at specific frequencies: 1.5 to 1.6 Megahertz.

Their work showed that sounds in this frequency range could cause dissociation in normal people: schizophrenia. They tried to find the analogue: sound frequencies that could “cure” people with schizophrenia. But they were unable to do so. As a hurricane approaches, Jeremy is heading back to Lux. Kim hears noises in the room next to hers. Before a man can attack her, she slips and falls, knocking herself unconscious.

When Logan gets back to Lux, Laura Benedict, the quantum computer scientist, calls him. She says that Roger Carbon has been acting suspiciously: she thinks he might be behind the death of Strachey.

Jeremy meets her in the basement, in her office. He finds out that she grew up near a shady company called Ironhand. He asks if her maiden name is Watkins. She says no: it’s Ramsey. Her grandfather was the scientist that came up with the Project Synesthesia machine.

She needed money to fund her continuation of her grandfather’s work, so she went to Ironhand, a company that funds startups. Initially, they stayed in the background. But when they saw the promise of a weapon that could drive an entire army insane, they became more hands on. And then, when Strachey was working in the West Wing, they feared he would discover Benedict’s work. So they stopped him by using the weapon on him.

Now, she locks Logan in the basement and calls Ironhand. Three of their goons chase Jeremy through the sub-basement. He is able to take a dumbwaiter up to the first floor, exiting into the dining room. Seeing one of the goons in the hallway outside the dining room, he takes an exit door to emerge outside, into the teeth of the hurricane.

He lures Benedict and the Ironhand goons to the forgotten room. He gets into one of the protective suits, and then turns the machine to 10, after first trying some of the lower power levels. The three men are driven quite insane, and Laura Benedict, back in the room above, loses her short-term memory. Logan takes an ax to the machine.

Epilogue. Olafson and his security staff, along with local law enforcement, destroy all information about the machine, and the machine itself. Olafson thanks Jeremy for saving Lux. Before he leaves, Logan meets with Kim, and they thank each other for their actions. As Logan drives away from Lux, he is followed by a car from Ironhand: apparently, they still exist. But Logan is hopeful that they don’t have enough scientific data to restart the program.

=== Full Wolf Moon (2017) ===
David Palmer is hiking in the Adirondacks. As he tries to get to Desolation Mountain, he is attacked and killed. And then, at the next full moon, another hiker is killed.

Three months after the first murder, Dr. Logan travels to a retreat in the Adirondacks, called Cloudwater, that caters to writers, artists, and musicians. He’s trying to finish a book that he’s been working on. He checks into the Thomas Cole cabin for a six-week stay. The director, Gregory Hartshorn, wants Logan in a cabin as opposed to the main house because he’s worried about his notoriety and how it will affect the other guests.

His old friend, Randall Jessup, now a forest ranger, asks Jeremy to look into the killings. The official story is that they were killed by bears, but people don’t think that’s true. Rather, they believe werewolves killed the hikers. And that the Blakeney clan is responsible. The family lives in a fortress deep in the woods, protected by a wall of trees, branches and twigs. Jeremy is deeply disturbed when he ventures to their compound and is threatened by them.

There is a local poet named Harrison Albright, and Jeremy drives to his house to speak with him about the murders. He seems to believe in the werewolf tale. As Logan leaves and heads back to Cloudwater, he gets a call from Jessup, informing him that there’s been another murder.

A researcher who is helping to study the Lunar Effect, at a compound in the woods. Dr. Laura Feverbridge is the leader. Her father had died a few months earlier. Then we discover that he is alive.

His daughter found a body at the bottom of a ravine, and identified it as her father. He had been ridiculed for his research and tried to kill himself. Now, he is free to complete his research.

Sam Woden, a crazy man, is suspected in the murders. But Logan meets him and thinks he is probably innocent. He had killed two people and been found not guilty due to insanity. He had been paroled recently, just before the first killing.

Sam the barber is out near the Blakeney compound, delivering vodka to his aunt. His car has trouble with a tire. He is attacked by something: from his description, sounds like a werewolf. Unfortunately, Randall Jessup stops to help, and he is killed by the beast.

Jeremy goes to Jessup’s home to console his widow. He finds Randall’s log book, and it contains information that Jessup had found just before he was killed. He had wanted to discuss his findings with Logan. His notes mention Albright, the Blakeney clan, and Dr. Feverbridge’s research.

Krenshaw is getting ready to storm the Blakeney compound, looking for the killer. Logan accompanies Albright to the Blakeney compound, to warn the Blakeney’s about the upcoming raid. There, they find out that Dr. Feverbridge had taken DNA and blood samples from some members of the clan, including Zephriam. Zephriam experiences morphological changes during the full moon, becoming, essentially, a werewolf, but without the aggressive tendencies.

Turns out that Dr. Chase Feverbridge developed a serum based on the blood and DNA that he took from Zephriam. He is the beast that has killed the hikers, his employee, and the ranger. Additionally, he killed the old hiker, then his daughter identified that body as her father’s.

He runs from his lab, with Albright and Logan in pursuit. At one point, he doubles back and ambushes them. He wounds Albright, and Logan manages to shoot him a couple times, but he’s able to continue pursuing Jeremy even with his wounds. Jeremy runs to the same cliff where Feverbridge pushed the hiker to his death. His daughter finds them and confronts her father, ready to shoot him with a shotgun. She and Logan appeal to him, and he backs himself off the cliff, killing himself to avoid making his daughter shoot him.

Two months later, Logan returns to visit Albright, who is recovering nicely. The Blakeney’s have been left alone. Laura is given a slap on the wrist: but Logan is a bit upset with that, and also blames himself for not turning in Chase as soon as he learned he was alive.
