= Blood Relatives =

Blood relatives are people who are descended from a common ancestor.

Blood relatives may also refer to:

- Blood Relatives (1978 film), a Canadian-French mystery film directed by Claude Chabrol
- Blood Relatives (2022 film), a horror-comedy film
- Blood Relatives (TV series), an American documentary television series
- "Blood Relatives" (Millennium), an episode of the television series Millennium
