= Johnny Berchtold =

American actor (born 1994)

- Born: July 7, 1994 (age 32); New Jersey, U.S.
- Occupation: Actor
- Years active: 2015–present
- Spouse: Casey Bailey-Berchtold (m. 2024)

Johnny Berchtold (born July 7, 1994) is an American actor. He is known for starring as Fielding Marshall in the Netflix drama film Dog Gone (2023) and Randolph "Randy" Bradley in the psychological thriller The Passenger (2023). He later played Richard Beck in the third season of the Prime Video action series Reacher (2025) and Paul Murdaugh in the Hulu limited series Murdaugh: Death in the Family (2025).

== Early life and education ==
Berchtold was raised in the Mays Landing section of Hamilton Township, Atlantic County, New Jersey. He attended Oakcrest High School, where he participated in theater and other performance activities. After graduating from Oakcrest, he attended the University of the Arts in Philadelphia.

== Career ==
Berchtold began appearing in film and television during the mid-2010s. In 2017, he portrayed a teenage Ted Kaczynski in the Discovery Channel drama series Manhunt: Unabomber. His television work subsequently included appearances in The Wilds, Gaslit and Tiny Beautiful Things. In 2022, Berchtold joined the off-Broadway production of Bess Wohl's Camp Siegfried at Second Stage Theater, replacing Johnny Flynn opposite Lily McInerny.

Berchtold had his first major film lead in the 2023 Netflix drama Dog Gone, portraying Fielding Marshall opposite Rob Lowe and Kimberly Williams-Paisley. The film, directed by Stephen Herek, is based on the true story of the Marshall family's search of the Appalachian Trail for their missing dog Gonker. Later that year, he starred opposite Kyle Gallner in the Blumhouse Productions psychological thriller The Passenger, directed by Carter Smith. Berchtold played Randolph "Randy" Bradley, a withdrawn fast-food employee who is taken hostage by co-worker Benson after witnessing a violent crime. Smith later said that Berchtold's audition established him as his preferred choice for Randy early in the casting process. Berchtold said he was attracted to the role because Randy was an otherwise ordinary character forced into an extreme situation.

In 2025, Berchtold joined the third season of the Prime Video action series Reacher as series regular Richard Beck, the son of businessman Zachary Beck, played by Anthony Michael Hall. He also appeared as Caleb Brandywine in the Western drama Broke, alongside Wyatt Russell, Dennis Quaid, Mary McDonnell and Tom Skerritt. That year, Berchtold portrayed Paul Murdaugh in Hulu's eight-part limited series Murdaugh: Death in the Family, opposite Jason Clarke as Alex Murdaugh and Patricia Arquette as Maggie Murdaugh. The series dramatized the events surrounding the prominent South Carolina Murdaugh family and the deaths associated with the Murdaugh case. Hulu also featured Berchtold in an episode of the series' official companion podcast discussing his research and approach to portraying Paul.

== Personal life ==
Berchtold married Casey Bailey in October 2024. In 2025, Berchtold was diagnosed with stage 1 testicular cancer, which was treated successfully with surgery. In 2026, the cancer returned and had metastasized to his pelvis, progressing to stage 3. After undergoing chemotherapy, Berchtold went into remission in late 2026.

== Filmography ==
=== Film ===
Year	Title	Role	Notes
2015	Jogger	Poisoned Jogger	Short film
2016	Flesh & Blood	Couple Boy	
2017	Lucidity	Teen	Short film
2017	The Impossible Joy	Joachim	Short film
2017	10 Guys Every Girl Meets at a House Party	Tommy	Short film
2017	Culdesac	Syd	Short film
2018	Cross	Damian Samuels	Short film
2019	How Far	Jared	Short film
2020	Dead Wonder	Frankie	Short film
2020	Lost In A Mistake	Liam	Short film
2021	Kaleidoscope Kids	Paul	Short film; also writer
2021	A Hard Problem	Ian	
2021	The Forbidden Wish	Isaac	
2021	Demon Juice	Delivery Guy	Short film
2023	Dog Gone	Fielding Marshall	
2023	Snow Falls	River	
2023	The Passenger	Randolph "Randy" Bradley	
2024	Test Screening	Simon	
2024	Thanks For Having Me	Wes	Short film; also writer & executive producer
2025	Broke	Caleb Brandywine	
2025	Self Tape	Reader	Short film
2026	Stay for the Q + A	Danny	Short film
2026	In Case of Fear	Scott Katz	Short film

=== Television ===
Year	Title	Role	Notes
2016	True Nightmares	Alton	Episode: "Home Sweet Hell"
2017	Murder Among Friends	Torey Adamcik/Isaac Grimes	2 episodes
2017	Manhunt	Teen Ted Kaczynski	Episode: "Ted"
2017	The Text Committee	James Greene	Episode: "Like-Like Status"
2018	Destroy X Fire	Ra	TV movie
2016-2018	Life as a Mermaid	Ryan/The Barnacle King	14 episodes
2018	The Look-See	David Capshaw	4 episodes
2019	20 Seconds to Live	Tom	Episode: "Inspiration"
2020	The Wilds	Quinn	Episode: "Day Twenty-Three"
2022	Gaslit	Jay Jennings	2 episodes
2023	Tiny Beautiful Things	Jess	3 episodes
2025	Reacher	Richard Beck	Main role; 8 episodes
2025	Murdaugh: Death in the Family	Paul Murdaugh	8 episodes
