= Olympus (TV series) =

- Genre: Fantasy; Mythological
- Created by: Nick Willing
- Starring: Tom York; Sonya Cassidy; Sonita Henry; Graham Shiels; Cas Anvar; John Emmet Tracy; Wayne Burns; Matt Frewer; Alan C. Peterson; Sophia Lauchlin Hirt
- Composer: Rich Walters
- Countries of origin: Canada; United Kingdom
- No. of seasons: 1
- No. of episodes: 13

Production
- Executive producers: Robert Halmi Jr.; Jim Reeve; Grant Rosenberg; Matthew O'Connor; Robert Halmi Sr.; Nick Willing
- Producers: Michael O'Connor; Tia Buhl; Tom Parkhouse
- Production locations: Vancouver, British Columbia
- Cinematography: Brian Johnson
- Production companies: Reunion Pictures; Great Point Media; LipSync Productions

Original release
- Network: Super Channel
- Release: 2 April – 2 July 2015

Olympus is a Canadian/British fantasy television series that premiered on Syfy in the USA and Super Channel in Canada on 2 April 2015. A retelling of Greek myths, the first season had thirteen episodes, and concluded on 2 July 2015. The series was cancelled in July 2015, and was poorly received by critics.

== Premise ==
The story of how several brave men and women banished the gods from Olympus to the unconscious realm, a place dubbed as the Kingdom of Hades, or the underworld. A young man, Hero, attempts to find the truths of his past and shed light on the future, which will inevitably link back to the gods themselves.

== Cast ==
=== Main ===
- Tom York as Hero
- Sonya Cassidy as the Oracle of Gaia (Pandora)
- Sonita Henry as Medea
- Graham Shiels as Aegeus
- Cas Anvar as Xerxes
- John Emmet Tracy as Pallas
- Wayne Burns as Lykos
- Matt Frewer as Daedalus
- Alan C. Peterson as Minos
- Sophia Lauchlin Hirt as Ariadne

=== Recurring ===
- Ben Cotton as Cyrus
- Spencer Drever as Alcimenes
- Levi Meaden as Kimon

== Broadcast ==
Olympus has been acquired by Spike for broadcast in the United Kingdom and Ireland from 15 April 2015 at 10 pm. The series premiered on Syfy in the United States on 2 April 2015.

== Critical reception ==
Critical reviews for the series were mostly negative, particularly for the campy acting, the heavy use of green screens, the special effects and for being similar to earlier fantasy epics, with Keith Uhlich of The Hollywood Reporter calling it "300 as shot for $300".

== Episodes ==
No.	Title	Directed by	Written by	Original air date
1	"The Temple of Gaia"	Nick Willing	Nick Willing	2 April 2015
Hero risks his life to rescue the Oracle of Gaia from the Cyclops... she's the only person who can answer questions about his mysterious past. What she reveals is shocking, and changes Hero's life forever. In Athens, the siegetorn city is mired in political turmoil and someone inside the royal court is planning a coup, starting with killing King Aegeus.
2	"Daedalus"	Nick Willing	Nick Willing	9 April 2015
Hero, Oracle and the genius inventor Daedalus form an unlikely alliance to find Hero's birthright – the Ring of the Magi. Meanwhile, Queen Medea finds out that Hero is the King's illegitimate firstborn son and she dispatches ruthless warrior priests to track him down and bring him to Athens.
3	"Ring of the Magi"	Martin Wood	Story by : Grant Rosenberg and Nick Willing; Teleplay by : Nick Willing	16 April 2015
Hero, Oracle and Daedalus narrowly escape capture and dismemberment by the warrior priests as they make their way to the forest of Troezen in search of the ring. In Athens, Medea agrees to take part in a tribute to Apollo, unaware that she's walking into a trap that could cost the Queen her life.
4	"Minos"	Martin Wood	Nick Willing	23 April 2015
Hero, Oracle and Daedalus are captured by the Minoan troops and brought before King Minos and his daughter, Ariadne who subject them to sadistic torture. As life in Athens grows more dire, Medea arranges for a Dorian mercenary to go on a mission: sneak into the Minoan camp and against all odds, kidnap Hero.
5	"Blood Brothers"	Amanda Tapping	Peter Hume	30 April 2015
Hero slips way into Athens to confront his father the King, only to be arrested and turned over to Prince Lykos. Once Lykos discovers Hero's identity, he realises that his place in the court, and in his father's heart, is threatened. Back at the Minoan camp, Daedalus unveils his plans for the ultimate war machine that will bring Athens to its knees.
6	"The Lexicon"	Amanda Tapping	Story by : Richard Beattie; Teleplay by : Richard Beattie & Nick Willing	7 May 2015
Medea and Aegeus try to convince Hero of the importance of solving the riddle of the Lexicon with the hope that he'll use his power to save Athens. Hero is not easily persuaded and must decide whether the Lexicon is a gift or a curse that he should rid himself of forever.
7	"Love and Time"	Nick Willing	Gillian Horvath & Nick Willing	21 May 2015
Hero and Medea travel to the Temple of Aphrodite where Hero must complete a critical task: to kill love. However, when he arrives he is stunned by what he finds there. Outside the temple, Medea is confronted by her sister, Chalciope: a Magi warrior and cold blooded killer who has come to reclaim her sacred ring and will do anything to get it back.
8	"Danger and Desire"	Martin Wood	Dennis Heaton	28 May 2015
The Minoans take over Athens, and King Minos is about to put Aegeus and the rest of the royal family to death when Hero comes to their rescue, striking a bargain with Minos – the Lexicon in return for sparing their lives. Minos agrees, unaware that Hero has plan which will either set him on the road to Olympus, or lead to the death of everyone he holds dear.
9	"Pandora's Tomb"	Amanda Tapping	Nick Willing	4 June 2015
En route to the door of Olympus, Hero and Princess Ariadne unexpectedly fall in love. They hurry through the country side, eager to reach Olympus, not realising that their destination may not turn out to be what they expect. In Athens, Lykos and Aegeus are being held in the dank prison caves where they must hide their identities, or suffer the terrifying rage of the other prisoners.
10	"Heritage"	Amanda Tapping	Nick Willing	11 June 2015
Medea risks her life to find Hero before he can accidentally open Pandora's tomb, but when she gets to him she realises she's too late – Ariadne's dead. A thick fog rolls out of the tomb, quickly spreading its freezing breath throughout the land. Hero and Medea barely get back to the safety of the palace, where Hero faces his second task – taking on his father in a fight to the death.
11	"The Speed of Time"	Andy Mikita	Nick Willing	18 June 2015
Hero and Medea are trapped in the frozen palace where Hero has a vision of Gaia who tells him if he tries to enter Olympus, he will die. Hero realises that if he is to survive, he'll need Medea's faith in the Gods, Daedalus' scientific genius and Oracle's visionary gifts. However, Oracle is with Minos on Mount Ida, snowbound and slowly freezing to death with King Minos.
12	"Door to Olympus"	Andy Mikita	Nick Willing	25 June 2015
Medea trades her body and soul to the demon goddess Circe in exchange for leading her, Hero, Daedalus and Oracle to the door of Olympus. Medea has only 24 hours before Circe claims her prize and Medea's life is forfeit. On their dangerous trek, they are attacked by the deadly Fates, as well as the trickster God Hermes. When they arrive at the door to Olympus, they are stunned by what they find.
13	"Truth"	Nick Willing	Nick Willing	2 July 2015
Hero, Oracle, Daedalus and Medea have made it inside the doors to Olympus – and now their real journey begins. Along the way, they are tested, judged, enlightened and bitterly disappointed. Nothing in the world of the gods turns out quite as they expected or hoped for. In the end, Hero and Oracle are faced with the most incredible and daunting task ever asked of Mortal Man.
