= Welcome to Happiness =

- Theatrical release poster
- Directed by: Oliver Thompson
- Written by: Oliver Thompson
- Produced by: Bay Dariz; Kyle Gallner; Molly Quinn; Oliver Thompson
- Starring: Kyle Gallner; Olivia Thirlby; Nick Offerman; Keegan-Michael Key; Brendan Sexton III; Josh Brener
- Cinematography: Justin Talley
- Edited by: Lilly Grabowski
- Music by: Oliver Thompson
- Production company: Minutehand Pictures
- Distributed by: Orion Pictures; FilmBuff
- Release dates: April 27, 2015 (NBFF); May 20, 2016 (United States)
- Running time: 109 minutes
- Country: United States
- Language: English
- Box office: $5,083

Welcome to Happiness is a 2015 American comedy film written and directed by Oliver Thompson and starring Kyle Gallner, Olivia Thirlby, Nick Offerman, Keegan-Michael Key, Brendan Sexton III and Josh Brener. It was released on May 20, 2016, by FilmBuff.

== Plot ==
Woody Ward is a writer of children's books whose rented apartment has a door in the closet that people can go through to undo mistakes they have made in their lives. When his career and romantic life both hit crises, he becomes dissatisfied that he himself cannot go through it.

== Cast ==
- Kyle Gallner as Woody
- Olivia Thirlby as Trudy
- Nick Offerman as Moses
- Keegan-Michael Key as Proctor
- Brendan Sexton III as Nyles
- Josh Brener as Ripley
- Molly Quinn as Lillian
- Paget Brewster as Priscilla
- Frances Conroy as Claiborne
- Bess Rous as Leah
- A.J. Trauth as Penley
- Robert Pike Daniel as Osmond
- Chauntal Lewis as Farrah
- Alexander Wright as Wayfarer

== Release ==
The film premiered at the Newport Beach Film Festival on April 27, 2015. It was released on May 20, 2016, by FilmBuff.

Following the premiere, Kino Lorber bought the rights to release it on DVD.

== Reception ==
On review aggregator website Rotten Tomatoes the film has an approval rating of 31% based on 16 critics, with an average rating of 4.90/10. On Metacritic, Welcome to Happiness holds an approval rating of 29 out of a 100 based on 6 critics, indicating "generally unfavorable reviews".

Matt Fagerholm of RogerEbert.com gave the film 2 out of 5, while Jared Mobarak of The Film Stage gave it a "C+".

Neil Genzlinger of The New York Times called Welcome to Happiness "an airy fantasy of a film" as well as "a little too determined to be eccentric".
