= Anna Grace Barlow =

American actress

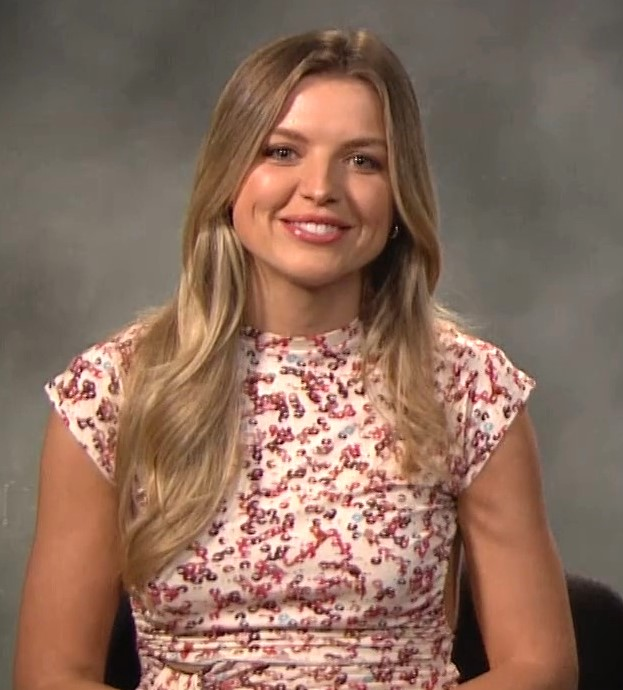
- Barlow in 2023
- Occupation: Actress
- Years active: 2008–present
- Children: 1
- Relatives: Abigail Barlow (sister)

Anna Grace Barlow (born July 17, 1994) is an American actress.

== Early life and career ==
She graduated from Mountain Brook High School.

She portrayed Zoe Hardisty in The Young and the Restless, Lilith in Supernatural, Brittney Lovewell in The Big Leap, and Cathe, the real life wife of Greg Laurie, in the 2023 feature film Jesus Revolution. She made her Broadway debut in the 2025 revival of the musical Ragtime as Evelyn Nesbit, a role she played from September 26, 2025, to June 14, 2026.

== Filmography ==
=== Film ===
Year	Title	Role	Notes
2008	One Lucky Boy	Student	Short film
2015	Perspective: Chapter 1; the Party	Unknown	
2015	Summer Forever	Chloe	
2018	The Last Breakfast Club	Claire	
2020	Dramarama	Rose	
2020	Play	Sophie	Short film
2020	The Never List	Taylor	
2021	Kaleidoscope Kids	Unknown	Short film
2021	Witch Hunt	Sofie	
2022	Love You Anyway	Katie	
2023	Snow Falls	Eden	
2023	Jesus Revolution	Cathe	

=== Television ===
Year	Title	Role	Notes
2015	Young & Hungry	Lauren	1 episode
2015	I Didn't Do It	Hayley	1 episode
2015	Scream	Daisy	2 episodes
2015	Faking It	Lana	1 episode
2015	Scream Queens	Bethany Stevens	4 episodes
2016	Castle	Annie Beakman	1 episode
2016	Best Friends Whenever	Young Rita	1 episode
2016	Bones	Esther Hanes	1 episode
2017	Major Crimes	Krista Matson	1 episode
2017	MK Ultra	Receptionist	1 episode
2016-2018	The Fosters	Zoe	7 episodes
2019	Lucifer	Lexy Shaw	1 episode
2019	Commanders	Aurora	8 episodes
2019	The Young and the Restless	Zoe Hardisty	10 episodes
2019	Supernatural	Lilith/Ashley Monroe	2 episodes
2019	Solve	Willa	1 episode
2020	Team Kaylie	Margot McCandless	1 episode
2020	All Rise	Jennifer Seigal	1 episode
2020-2021	NCIS	Karen/Sasha Myshkin	2 episodes
2020-2021	The Goldbergs	Lisa Levine	3 episodes
2021	Acapulco	Debbie the Bride	1 episode
2021	The Big Leap	Brittney Lovewell	11 episodes
2022	Grey's Anatomy	Charlotte Marsh	1 episode
2022	Big Sky	Natalie	1 episode
2023	NCIS: Hawaiʻi	Adriana Velazco	1 episode
2024	Blue Bloods	Ms. Davis	1 episode
