= Reacher season 3 =

Reacher
- Season 3
- Promotional poster
- Showrunner: Nick Santora
- Starring: Alan Ritchson; Maria Sten; Sonya Cassidy; Johnny Berchtold; Roberto Montesinos; Olivier Richters; Brian Tee; Anthony Michael Hall
- No. of episodes: 8

Release
- Original network: Amazon Prime Video
- Original release: February 20 – March 27, 2025

Season chronology
- ← Previous; Season 2 Next → Season 4

The third season of the American action crime television series Reacher, based on the Jack Reacher book series by Lee Child, premiered on Amazon Prime Video on February 20, 2025.

The season, based on Persuader (2003), stars Alan Ritchson, Maria Sten, Sonya Cassidy, Johnny Berchtold, Roberto Montesinos, Olivier Richters, Brian Tee, and Anthony Michael Hall.

The story follows Reacher, a former major in the United States Army Military Police Corps, who has agreed to work with the US Drug Enforcement Administration (DEA) to bring down suspected drug smuggler Zachary Beck by going undercover as the bodyguard of Beck's son, Richard. During the investigation, Reacher encounters a ruthless adversary from his military past, and must balance his desire for revenge against his need to finish his mission.

In October 2024, ahead of the third season premiere, the series was renewed for a fourth season.

== Episodes ==
No. overall	No. in season	Title	Directed by	Written by	Original release date
17	1	"Persuader"	Sam Hill	Scott Sullivan	February 20, 2025
In Maine, Reacher saves a young man from a kidnapping and accidentally kills a cop. The young man, Richard Beck, reveals that someone had kidnapped him before and his father, Zachary Beck, only paid the ransom when his ear was amputated. Reacher meets Zachary, who he finds suspiciously wealthy despite only being a rugseller. Zachary thanks him for saving his son and offers him a bodyguard job if he plays Russian roulette; Reacher does, passing his test. Reacher is working undercover for Susan Duffy, a DEA agent who recruited him to find undercover agent Teresa Daniels, who went missing investigating Zachary. In exchange, they will help Reacher capture an old nemesis, Lieutenant Colonel Francis Xavier Quinn. Reacher had seen Quinn leave a car owned by Zachary, suspecting that Zachary transports drugs. They'd staged Richard's kidnapping and the cop's "death". Reacher sneaks into the underground cellar and discovers that Teresa was there.
18	2	"Truckin'"	Sam Hill	Penny Cox	February 20, 2025
Duffy tries to elicit information about Teresa from Richard's bodyguard, whom they are holding captive. Zachary's head of security, Chapman Duke, sends Reacher to check out the hijacked cars from the kidnapping. Duffy manages to change the license plate on one of the cars to keep their kidnapping story safe. Duke orders Reacher to take a truck to New London, Connecticut to test his loyalty. Reacher meets with Duffy to check the trailer for drugs or Teresa's body, but they only find rugs. Back in Maine, one of Zachary's men, Angel Doll, confronts Reacher, suspecting that he is a cop. Reacher is forced to kill him when he comes too close to blowing Reacher's cover.
19	3	"Number 2 with a Bullet"	Gary Fleder	Cait Duffy	February 20, 2025
At the warehouse, Reacher and Duffy clean up Doll's remains and kill two of Zachary's workers who arrive. Duffy takes Doll's laptop to investigate it. Reacher spends time with Richard, who tells him that his father is not top dog: Zachary is forced to work for Julius McCabe, who took over his operation and was behind Richard's kidnapping. Reacher realizes he needs to get closer to Zachary to get in on the operation and comes up with a plan. He deceptively leads Duke and Zachary to the kidnapper's hiding spot (in reality, a DEA safehouse). There, he kills Duke, needing to take his place. Faking a shootout, he wins over Zachary and becomes his new head of security.
20	4	"Dominique"	Sam Hill	Lillian Wang	February 27, 2025
Reacher discovers from photos Duffy took that Julius McCabe is Xavier Quinn. He finally reveals why he wants Quinn dead. In his army captain days, Reacher had been given a new partner, green officer Dominique Kohl, to investigate Roland Gorowski. Gorowski worked for Quinn, selling state secrets because Quinn threatened his family. Reacher and Kohl intercept one of Quinn's buyers, a Syrian businessman, Safwan Qasim. Having enough evidence to prosecute him, Reacher allows Kohl to arrest Quinn. Quinn instead kidnaps Kohl and Reacher finds her body hanging in a barn. He shoots Quinn in retaliation and Quinn falls off the cliffs into the water. He was supposed to have died but survived with retrograde amnesia. In the present, Zachary sends Reacher to Duffy's location, as Doll's laptop has a tracking device. Three of Quinn's men also arrive to kill her and her partner Villanueva.
21	5	"Smackdown"	Sam Hill	Michael J. Gutierrez	March 6, 2025
Reacher helps Duffy and Villanueva escape. Zachary's captive bodyguard kills Duffy's other team member, Eliot, and escapes. Duffy warns Reacher the bodyguard is coming so he formulates a plan. Duffy cuts the power, and Reacher uses Villanueva as bait to kill the bodyguard before he can inform Zachary of the truth. Zachary tells Reacher that Annette, a maid at the house that Reacher was becoming friends with, was an ATF infiltrator. Hulking bodyguard Paulie accidentally killed her. Her death leaves Reacher disheartened. He learns that Quinn is dealing in firearms, not drugs, and accompanies Zachary to meet him, determined to kill Quinn once and for all.
22	6	"Smoke on the Water"	Sam Hill	Scott Sullivan	March 13, 2025
Due to his retrograde amnesia, Quinn does not recognize Reacher. Reacher refrains from killing Quinn when he realizes Teresa is alive and Quinn is holding her hostage to sell her. He learns that Quinn is at risk with Russian mobsters, to whom he owes money. Richard catches Reacher with Duffy and learns that Reacher is a mole. Learning that the members investigating him were part of the same 110th army unit, Quinn confronts Zachary, who realizes that said unit was Reacher's. Quinn sends Paulie to kill Reacher, but he escapes. Quinn punishes Zachary by having Paulie cut off his ear. Reacher and Duffy track down Harley, a member of Zachary's security team, on whose boat Teresa was being hidden. Harley claims that Quinn moved Teresa. They kill Harley and Reacher says that despite his cover being blown, they have one more person in Los Angeles who can help them.
23	7	"L.A. Story"	Sam Hill	Penny Cox & Cait Duffy	March 20, 2025
Neagley interrogates Costopoulos, the man who hired her attackers, who tells her that Quinn will murder the Becks. In Los Angeles, Reacher and Duffy track down Darien, a drug dealer working for Zachary, and blackmail him into cooperating with their plan. He calls Zachary, and Zachary meets with Neagley, who convinces him to work with Reacher, since his son is in danger. The team discovers that the weapons are being sold to Yemeni buyers to carry out terrorist attack. Zachary informs Reacher of the time and place of the exchange. Duffy gets the ATF involved but Reacher learns that the exchange is a trap: the actual deal is taking place at Zachary's house.
24	8	"Unfinished Business"	Sam Hill	Scott Sullivan	March 27, 2025
Quinn's henchmen ambush the ATF team and kill them all, but Reacher, Duffy, and Villanueva take them out and save Zachary, leaving a truck driver alive to sneak them into the house. Reacher finds a formidable opponent in Paulie, whom he finally manages to kill after a brutal fight. Duffy saves Teresa. When Reacher kills Quinn's men, Quinn kills the buyers, shoots Zachary dead, and flees; he is confronted outside by the Russian gangster Taktarov. Reacher and Neagley offer Taktarov the money in exchange for Quinn, and they accept. Reacher reminds Quinn about Kohl and kills him, exacting revenge. In the aftermath, Richard leaves for a new life; Duffy returns Teresa to her grandmother and is let go from the DEA for her actions in the case; Reacher rides off on a motorcycle to his next destination.

== Cast and characters ==
=== Main ===
- Alan Ritchson as Jack Reacher
- Maria Sten as Frances Neagley, a former Master Sergeant in the U.S. Army and a private investigator
- Sonya Cassidy as Susan Duffy, a DEA agent
- Johnny Berchtold as Richard Beck, Zachary's son
- Roberto Montesinos as Guillermo Villanueva, a DEA agent
- Olivier Richters as Paul "Paulie" van Hoven, Quinn's bodyguard
- Brian Tee as Francis Xavier Quinn / Julius McCabe, a corrupt Lieutenant Colonel in Army Intelligence
- Anthony Michael Hall as Zachary Beck, Richard's father

=== Recurring ===
- Daniel David Stewart as Steven Eliot
- Ronnie Rowe Jr. as John Cooper
- Caitlin McNerney as Annette
- Helen Taylor as Agnes

=== Guest ===
- Donald Sales as Chapman Duke
- Storm Steenson as Teresa Daniels
- Greg Bryk as Darien Prado
- Owen Roth as Warrant Officer Powell
- Manuel Rodriguez-Saenz as Angel Doll
- Milton Barnes as Sklar
- Mick Betancourt as Clark
- Brendan Fletcher as Harley, Quinn's henchman
- Mariah Robinson as Sergeant Dominique Kohl
- Andreas Apergis as General Leon Garber
- Robert Bazzocchi as Private Anthony "Tony" Frasconi
- Johnathan Sousa as Specialist Roland Gorowski
- Farhang Ghajar as Safwan Qasim
- Aleks Paunovic as Taktarov, a dangerous Russian crime boss
- Drew Nelson as Greene
- Anousha Alamian as Nasser
- Mark Taylor as Wolcott
- Nicky Guadagni as Mrs. Daniels, Teresa's grandmother

== Production ==
=== Development ===
On December 2, 2023, ahead of the second-season premiere, it was revealed that filming of a third season had begun.

=== Casting ===
On February 8, 2024, Anthony Michael Hall and Sonya Cassidy were cast as series regulars for the third season. On March 6, 2024, Brian Tee, Johnny Berchtold and Roberto Montesinos were cast as regulars of the third season, while Daniel David Stewart in a recurring role. In May 2024, bodybuilder Olivier Richters, also known as "the Dutch Giant", was cast as Persuader's secondary antagonist Paulie.

=== Filming ===
Filming for the third season took place in between July and November 2023. Different parts of Canada served as backdrops, including Millbrook, Brantford and Downtown St. John's.

== Release ==
The first three episodes of the season were released on February 20, 2025, with an additional episode released each week through March 27, 2025.

== Reception ==
The third season has a 98% approval rating on Rotten Tomatoes, based on 46 critic reviews, with an average rating of 7.9/10. The website's critics consensus states, "Jack Reacher finally picks a fight with someone his own size in this crunchy third season, reliably doling out justice to foes and satisfaction to viewers." Metacritic assigned a score of 76 out of 100 based on 11 critics, indicating "generally favorable reviews". The latest season was complimented by Forbes for having improved after certain disappointments from the previous season.
