= Dog Gone (2023 film) =

American biographical drama film by Stephen Herk

- Official release poster
- Directed by: Stephen Herek
- Written by: Nick Santora
- Based on: Dog Gone: A Lost Pet's Extraordinary Journey and the Family Who Brought Him Home by Pauls Toutonghi
- Produced by: Nick Santora; Jeremy Kipp Walker
- Starring: Rob Lowe; Johnny Berchtold; Kimberly Williams-Paisley; Nick Peine
- Cinematography: Michael Martinez
- Edited by: Amy P. McGrath
- Music by: Emily Bear
- Production companies: Blackjack Films; Story Ink
- Distributed by: Netflix
- Release date: January 14, 2023
- Running time: 95 minutes
- Country: United States
- Language: English

Dog Gone is a 2023 American biographical drama film directed by Stephen Herek. It was released by Netflix on January 14, 2023.

== Plot ==
Fielding is a socially awkward college kid, who decides to adopt a puppy after being rejected by a girl. He finds a yellow lab puppy at the local pound and adopts him. He names the dog Gonker, and they are inseparable for the rest of his college career. The dog often runs with him to class on campus without a leash. When college is done, all of Fielding's friends have jobs, but Fielding does not know what he wants to do with his life, which worries his father, John. Fielding moves in with his parents with Gonker. A few weeks later, Gonker is diagnosed with Addison's disease and needs a life-saving shot every month for the rest of his life.

Nate, his best friend from college, visits him a few weeks later, and they are out on a hiking trail with Gonker, who runs off chasing a fox. When he doesn't return, they start looking for him, but cannot find him. Panicked, they rush home and tell Fielding's parents that Gonker might be lost.

There are flashbacks of Fielding's mother Ginny having a dog, Oji, when she was a young girl, who was run over when she was at school. Her parents are shown to be cold and unfeeling and encourage her to not make a big deal about it. She buries the pain and trauma, but it gets triggered by Gonker's loss and bubbles up to the surface. She sets up a control room in their house, calling local newspapers, animal shelters, hospitals, and starts sending out flyers throughout the state. Local newspapers and then national newspapers pick up Gonker's story and there are now a lot of people looking for Gonker. They have to find him before he needs his next shot in three weeks.

During the extensive search, Fielding's health takes a turn for the worse. He is not eating much, barely sleeping, and getting weaker by the day. They receive a call about a dog with Addison's disease from an animal shelter and rush there only to find that it is not Gonker. They keep looking but are not having much luck. Seeing Fielding's deteriorating health, his father decides to drive him back home and call off the search and rescue. Just then, they receive a call of another sighting, and this time it is Gonker. They bring him back home which immediately perks Fielding up. But Fielding has to be rushed to the hospital where he is diagnosed with ulcerative colitis and has an emergency operation, which is successful. The movie ends on an optimistic note with both Gonker and Fielding sleeping together in his hospital bed and recuperating. During the credits, it was revealed that Gonker never left the Marshalls again and Fielding now lives in Chile giving kayaking tours.

== Cast ==
- Rob Lowe as John Marshall
- Johnny Berchtold as Fielding Marshall
- Kimberly Williams-Paisley as Ginny Marshall
- Nick Peine as Nate
- Savannah Bruffey as Peyton Marshall
- Brian Brightman as Ginny's Dad
- Holly Morris as Ginny's Mom
- Soji Arai as Japanese Official
- Annabella Didion as Julie
- Daniel Annone as Doug

== Production ==
In August 2021, it was announced Rob Lowe would star in and executive produce Dog Gone for Netflix based on the book Dog Gone: A Lost Pet’s Extraordinary Journey and the Family Who Brought Him Home by Pauls Toutonghi, itself based on a true story. Principal photography took place in Atlanta, Georgia and surrounding areas in the fall of 2021.

== Release ==
Dog Gone was released on Netflix on January 13, 2023 in the United States and worldwide.

== Score ==
Emily Bear composed the film's score; the soundtrack album was also released in January 2023. Nell Minow of RogerEbert.com called it "a fine score", while Jonathan Broxton of Movie Music UK wrote: "The whole thing overflows with charm and warmth, and is awash in beautifully sentimental string passages, backed by appealing woodwind writing, and enlivened with moments of sprightly piano-led effervescence, light comedy, and entertaining action featuring lively guitars and jovial percussion. [The score] is consistently enjoyable and dramatically engaging throughout ... [and is] by turns sprightly and lively, warmly nostalgic, and playfully comedic."

== Reception ==
On the review aggregator website Rotten Tomatoes, 43% of 21 critics' reviews are positive, with an average rating of 5.2/10. The website's consensus reads: "Not necessarily mangy but far from fetching, Dog Gone is a treacly melodrama that aims for Very Good Boy only to settle for simply tolerable." Metacritic, which uses a weighted average, assigned the film a score of 42 out of 100, based on 6 critics, indicating "mixed or average" reviews.
