= Reacher season 4 =

Reacher
- Season 4
- Promotional poster
- Showrunner: Nick Santora
- Starring: Alan Ritchson; Sydelle Noel; Agnez Mo; Anggun; Christopher Marquette; Kevin Corrigan
- No. of episodes: 8

Release
- Original network: Amazon Prime Video
- Original release: August 12 – September 16, 2026

Season chronology
- ← Previous; Season 3

The fourth season of the American action crime television series Reacher, based on the Jack Reacher book series by Lee Child, premiered on Amazon Prime Video on August 12, 2026.

The season, based on Gone Tomorrow (2009), stars Alan Ritchson, Sydelle Noel, Agnez Mo, Anggun, Christopher Marquette, and Kevin Corrigan. The story follows Reacher, a former major in the United States Army Military Police Corps, who has an encounter with a troubled woman named Anna Merrick on a train that takes a dangerous turn, and finds himself caught up in a complex and deadly conspiracy involving a missing USB drive, and enemies at the highest ranks of power.

In May 2026, the series was renewed for a fifth season.

== Episodes ==
No. overall	No. in season	Title	Directed by	Written by	Original release date
25	1	"City of Brotherly Love"	Sam Hill	Nick Santora	August 12, 2026
During a subway ride in Philadelphia, Jack Reacher questions Anna Merrick, believing her to be a suicide bomber, but ends up witnessing her suicide. Philadelphia detectives Tamara Green and Shaun Docherty interrogate Reacher and reveal that Anna worked for the government. Federal agents then ask him if Anna gave him anything, but he denies it. Two thugs demand a USB drive from Reacher they believe Anna gave him, but he fights them off. He then meets Anna's brother, Jacob, who tells him he believes Anna did not commit suicide willingly. Reacher uses a fake USB drive to obtain information, leading him to Lila Hoth, who has leukemia and discovered that Congressman John Sampson is her biological father. The USB drive was for Lila to blackmail Sampson into helping her. While investigating Sampson with Jacob, Reacher fights another attacker and kills him. After the attack, Reacher realizes Lila is in danger and goes to her hotel room, where he fights a man who manages to escape. Later, men in suits drug Reacher in an alley and take him away in a van.
26	2	"Cage Fight"	Sam Hill	Scott Sullivan	August 12, 2026
Reacher wakes up in a cell with Jacob and Tamara after being kidnapped by CIA agents. Interrogated by agent Foster about the USB drive, Reacher pretends to cooperate, then incapacitates them and frees Jacob and Tamara. They escape with help from journalist Russell Plum and discover they have been taken to Washington, D.C. Tamara and Jacob search Anna's house, where they find it ransacked and knock out an armed man. Reacher meets Sampson's wife, Elsbeth, who gives him Sampson's address. In the location, the same federal agents who questioned him in Philadelphia warn him to stop investigating. Tamara and Jacob tell Reacher that Anna's son, Ben, has disappeared. Back in Philadelphia, Reacher finds Colin, Ben's friend, at a fraternity house, who says Ben left with an OnlyFans model, Mary Ellen Daniels. They find Mary murdered in her apartment and that Ben has been kidnapped. In Washington, Reacher confronts Sampson, who denies having an illegitimate child, and then locates Nolan Cahill, Sampson's chief of staff and a witness of Anna's suicide.
27	3	"One Small Step"	Sam Hill	Seth Cohen & Amy Pocha	August 12, 2026
The trio returns to Plum's office to learn more about Cahill, but mercenaries arrive searching for the USB drive after Plum falsely claimed online that he had it. The group kill the mercenaries and escape. Tamara manages to get a new car to avoid being tracked. Reacher meets Lila alone, and she reveals that she lied about everything: she is actually a journalist investigating the torture and killing of protesters in Indonesia, which her colleague Amisha survived, by the military, among whom was Sampson, led by General Putra. Reacher then fights off attackers targeting Lila and Amisha at a bowling alley. Meanwhile, Jacob, Tamara, and Plum find Anna's car and discover a job card that's different from the one from the Pentagon. After Lila opens up to Reacher, they have sex at the hotel. Reacher travels to Baltimore to confront Sampson, who denies torturing or killing Indonesian civilians. When Reacher and Sampson question Cahill about his presence on the train, Cahill jumps off the roof.
28	4	"Karambits and Pieces"	Gary Fleder	Penny Cox	August 19, 2026
Plum learns that Anna had been digitizing ten-year-old documents for the U.S. State Department. Sampson tells Reacher that he was in Indonesia to escort some scientists and that the torture and murders took place after his departure. Tamara infiltrates the building and finds a deleted file on Anna's computer. The group later theorizes Anna intended to give the USB drive to Ben's kidnappers, but after learning he was dead, she sought revenge and carried a gun instead in the subway. Docherty tells Tamara that Ben has been found dead. Reacher suspects Anna mailed the USB drive to Lila, and, while searching for it, they are followed; Reacher manages to get Lila onto a subway train, then kills one attacker, while the other one dies accidentally, and is forced to flee. Jacob and Tamara discover that Mary and Ben were killed with an Indonesian karambit. Lila and Amisha kill other attackers with karambits in their hotel room and, when Reacher arrives, he finds the attackers dead and is arrested.
29	5	"Bridge"	Gary Fleder	Cait Duffy	August 26, 2026
Reacher resists arrest and ends up hiding in a hotel garbage chute. During a call, the group deduce the Hoths were behind everything and that Anna sent the USB to Jacob, whom she trusted most. Reacher is arrested, while Plum discovers the Hoths' names are fake and Lila brought a mysterious man into the country. Jacob finds Anna's phone and USB drive in his mail before the Hoths attack him and Tamara, until they crash into a bridge and jump off to avoid arrest. Foster tries to kill Reacher and stage it as suicide, but Reacher overpowers him and escapes. Jacob finds Lila's chats with Anna, including an address and videos of Mary and Ben being tortured. Reacher asks Sampson about the USB photo of him, Putra and a scientist, but gets no answer. The group discovers Reacher is wanted, and Tamara's staged arrest fails when a cleaning woman exposes them as accomplices. They escape the police and reach the address found on Anna's phone, an abandoned restaurant, where the Hoths hold Jacob hostage.
30	6	"Plum Out of Luck"	Gary Fleder	Mick Betancourt & Seth Cohen & Amy Pocha	September 2, 2026
The Hoths demand Reacher the USB drive or they will kill Jacob, just when Plum arrives and mercenaries attack them. The Hoths, Reacher and Tamara kill the mercenaries while Jacob tries to stabilize Plum after he is shot. The Hoths manage to obtain the USB drive, and before Jacob takes Plum to the hospital, he tells Reacher that the scientist in the photo is Leo Ahlquist. Jacob is forced to hide at the hospital, as the entire group is now wanted. Reacher and Tamara hide in the bus's cargo hold to travel to Dover and find Ahlquist. Monty DeRosa, a close friend of Jacob, sets him a trap to keep him safe and is arrested by Docherty, who breaks the agreement. Reacher and Tamara arrive at Ahlquist's company and discover that he has been sending the mercenaries. Ahlquist sends mercenaries to kill them. Reacher and Tamara fight them but are overpowered, then handcuffed in a van and held at gunpoint. Jacob discovers that Docherty has been ordered to kill him.
31	7	"Vote for Sampson"	Sam Hill	Scott Sullivan	September 9, 2026
When the mercenaries are about to kill Reacher and Tamara, Springfield, Sampson's head of security, saves them by killing the mercenaries. Docherty releases Jacob, and stages a fake scuffle with him. Reacher, Tamara, and Springfield intercept Ahlquist, who reveals that the scientists in Indonesia developed a deadly chemical weapon, but never completed the antidote, and that AI can now decipher the formula from the blurry board of the photo. Reacher kills Ahlquist to prevent the Hoths from using him. Meanwhile, the Hoths test the weapon on a drug addict, who dies. Jacob learns that they plan to auction the USB drive on the dark web and demonstrate the weapon that night. Reacher learns from Sampson that it will happen at his campaign dinner. Sampson reveals he killed Putra and that Amisha, who served under him and idolized him, is seeking revenge. Sampson identifies the man who has the toxin and tackles him from the balcony into the water as he detonates the weapon.
32	8	"Cut"	Sam Hill	Scott Sullivan	September 16, 2026
After Sampson's death, Plum wakes up and identifies the suicide bomber as Tomas Waberi to Docherty. Reacher, Tamara, and Jacob deduce that the Hoths are reproducing the toxin at the abandoned restaurant and go there. Jacob and Tamara try to retrieve the toxin, but a thug manages to take it and leave. Reacher fights the Hoths and, despite being severely wounded, throws Amisha out the window. Jacob and Tamara follow the thug to a nightclub, where Tamara kills him and the vial survives the fall, preventing the releasing. Lila tries to inject Reacher with the toxin, but he injects it into her instead, killing her. Foster tries to kill a weakened Reacher, but Amisha kills him. Jacob then incapacitates Amisha and considers killing her, but arrests her instead. Reacher later wakes up in the hospital, learns they are no longer wanted and gives Plum the USB drive to restart his career. In the aftermath, Tamara is reinstated as inspector, Jacob mourns the death of his sister and nephew, and Reacher leaves Philadelphia.

== Cast and characters ==
=== Main ===
- Alan Ritchson as Jack Reacher
- Sydelle Noel as Tamara Green, a detective in the Philadelphia Police Department
- Agnez Mo as Lila Hoth, an Indonesian assassin posing as a journalist
- Anggun as Amisha Hoth, an Indonesian assassin and Lila's mentor
- Christopher Marquette as Jacob Merrick, a small-town police officer
- Kevin Corrigan as Detective Shaun Docherty, Tamara's partner

=== Recurring ===
- Dean Armstrong as Foster, a CIA agent
- Jason Diaz as McMichaels (Snap)
- Kerby Darius as Jarvis (Crackle)
- Michael Gaty as Buhner (Pop)
- Chris Owens as Nolan Cahill
- Kevin Weisman as Russell Plum, a freelance journalist in Washington, DC
- Marc Blucas as Congressman John Sampson
- Kathleen Robertson as Elspeth Sampson, John's wife
- Aaron Poole as Springfield, Sampson's head of security

=== Guest ===
- Karen Kwong-Chip as Anna Merrick
- Denis Wong as Ben Merrick
- Manon Ens-Lapointe as Mary Ellen Daniels
- Richard Walters as Cyrus
- Raven Dauda as Cheryl Brewster
- Edie Inksetter as Chester, a medical examiner
- Jay Hieron as Bennett, an assassin
- Nick Searcy as Monty DeRosa, a lieutenant in the MPD
- Shawn Doyle as Leo Ahlquist, a former military scientist
- Byron Abalos as Hartano
- Rodger Edralin as General Reza Putra, a rogue Indonesian military officer

== Production ==
=== Development ===
During the third season press tour, author Lee Child announced the book the fourth season would be based on was decided and its script was done.

=== Casting ===
On June 13, 2025, Jay Baruchel, Sydelle Noel, Agnez Mo, Anggun, and Kevin Corrigan were cast as series regulars for the fourth season while Kevin Weisman, Marc Blucas, and Kathleen Robertson were cast in recurring roles. Later that month, Baruchel was replaced by Christopher Marquette after exiting the series due to a personal matter.

=== Filming ===
Principal photography for the fourth season began on June 16, 2025, with former US President Joe Biden and his son Hunter visiting the set in Rittenhouse Square in Philadelphia. Filming wrapped by November 18, 2025.

== Release ==
The season premiered on August 12, 2026, with its first three episodes. The remaining five episodes were released weekly until September 16.

== Reception ==
The fourth season has a 94% approval rating on Rotten Tomatoes, based on 35 critic reviews, with an average rating of 7.6/10. The website's critics consensus states, "Reacher maintains its formula for maximum entertainment, serving more brawn, enough narrative brains, and always the right amount of Alan Ritchson to keep the operation up and running for seasons to come." Metacritic assigned a score of 77 out of 100 based on 11 critics, indicating "generally favorable reviews".
