= Karambit =

Curved South East Asian knife

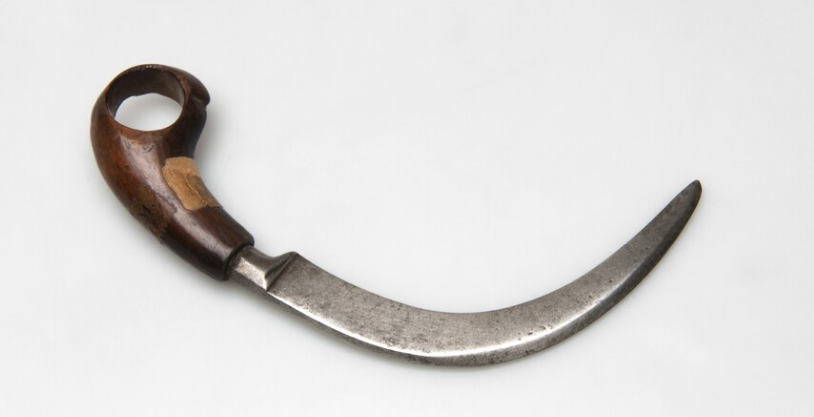
- A traditional Minangkabau style karambit, Lawi Ayam, pre-1887.
- Type: Concealed blade
- Place of origin: Indonesia (West Sumatra)

Specifications
- Blade type: Single, double or triple edged, crescent curve
- Hilt type: Water buffalo horn, wooden, ivory
- Scabbard/sheath: Water buffalo horn, wooden

The karambit or kerambit (as used in Indonesian), kurambik or karambiak (both from the Minangkabau language) is a small curved knife resembling a claw, originally used as an agricultural implement.

== Origin ==
The karambit is believed to have originally been weaponized among the Minangkabau people of West Sumatra where, according to folklore, it was inspired by the claws of a tiger.

As it was weaponised, the blade became more curved to maximise cutting potential.

Through Indonesia's trade network and close contact with neighbouring countries, the weaponization of the karambit was eventually dispersed through what are now Malaysia, the Philippines, Thailand, Cambodia, Laos, and Myanmar.

European accounts tell that soldiers in Indonesia were armed with a kris at their waist or back and a spear in their hands, while the karambit was used as a last resort when the fighter's other weapons were lost in battle.

The renowned Bugis warriors of Sulawesi were famous for their embrace of the karambit.

== Technique ==
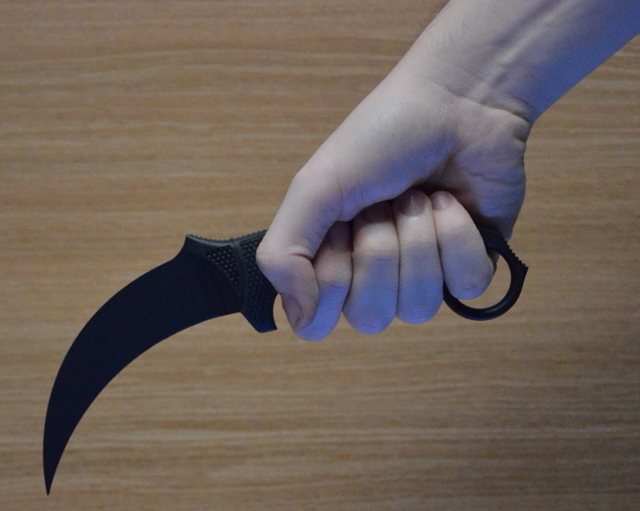
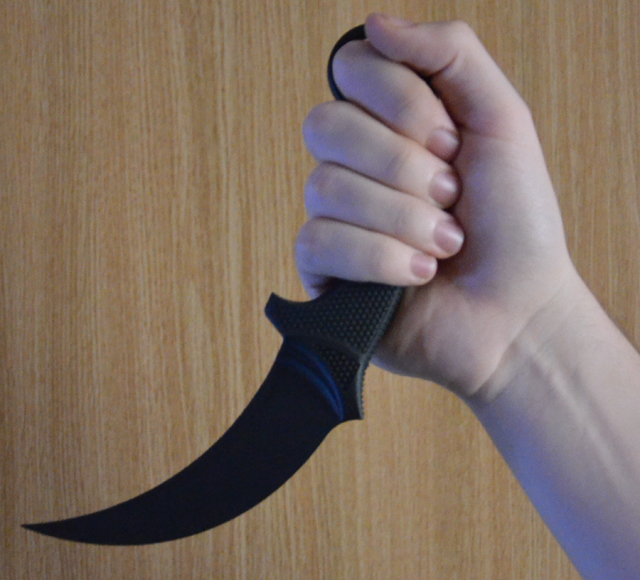
A modern karambit, held in reverse grip (left) called hammer grip, and held traditionally (right).

=== As a tool ===
The karambit was originally an agricultural implement designed to rake roots, gather threshing and plant rice in most of island Southeast Asia.

It is a smaller variant of the Southeast Asian sickles (Indonesia celurit, arit, or sabit; Filipino garab and karit; and Malaysian sabit).

It still possesses many efficient uses for the modern laborer, allowing use of the blade for utility work, with the finger ring eliminating the need to put the knife down between operations, if use of the fingers to manipulate the object to be worked on is required (such as the action of cutting and opening a shipping box, or removing plastic wrap from shipments, in two very basic examples).

The finger ring also provides an added degree of protection against dropping the knife during use, which is particularly essential in work environments that include heavy machinery, into which dropping a handheld, metal tool of any kind can cause massive damage to the equipment and those around it, especially if the tool is ejected at high velocity from rotating components.

=== As a weapon ===
The karambit is held with the blade pointing downward from the bottom of the fist, usually curving forwards.

While it is primarily used in a slashing or hooking motion, karambit with a finger ring are also used in a punching motion, hitting the opponent with the finger ring.

Some karambit are designed to be used in a hammering motion. This flexibility of striking methods is what makes it useful in self-defense situations.

The finger guard makes it difficult to disarm and allows the knife to be maneuvered in the fingers without losing one's grip.

The short Filipino karambit has found some favor in the West because such proponents allege the biomechanics of the weapon allow for more powerful cutting strokes and painful "ripping" wounds, and because its usability is hypothesized as more intuitive, but more difficult to master than a classic knife.

=== In martial arts ===
The karambit is one of the weapons commonly used in pencak silat and Filipino martial arts.

== Variations ==
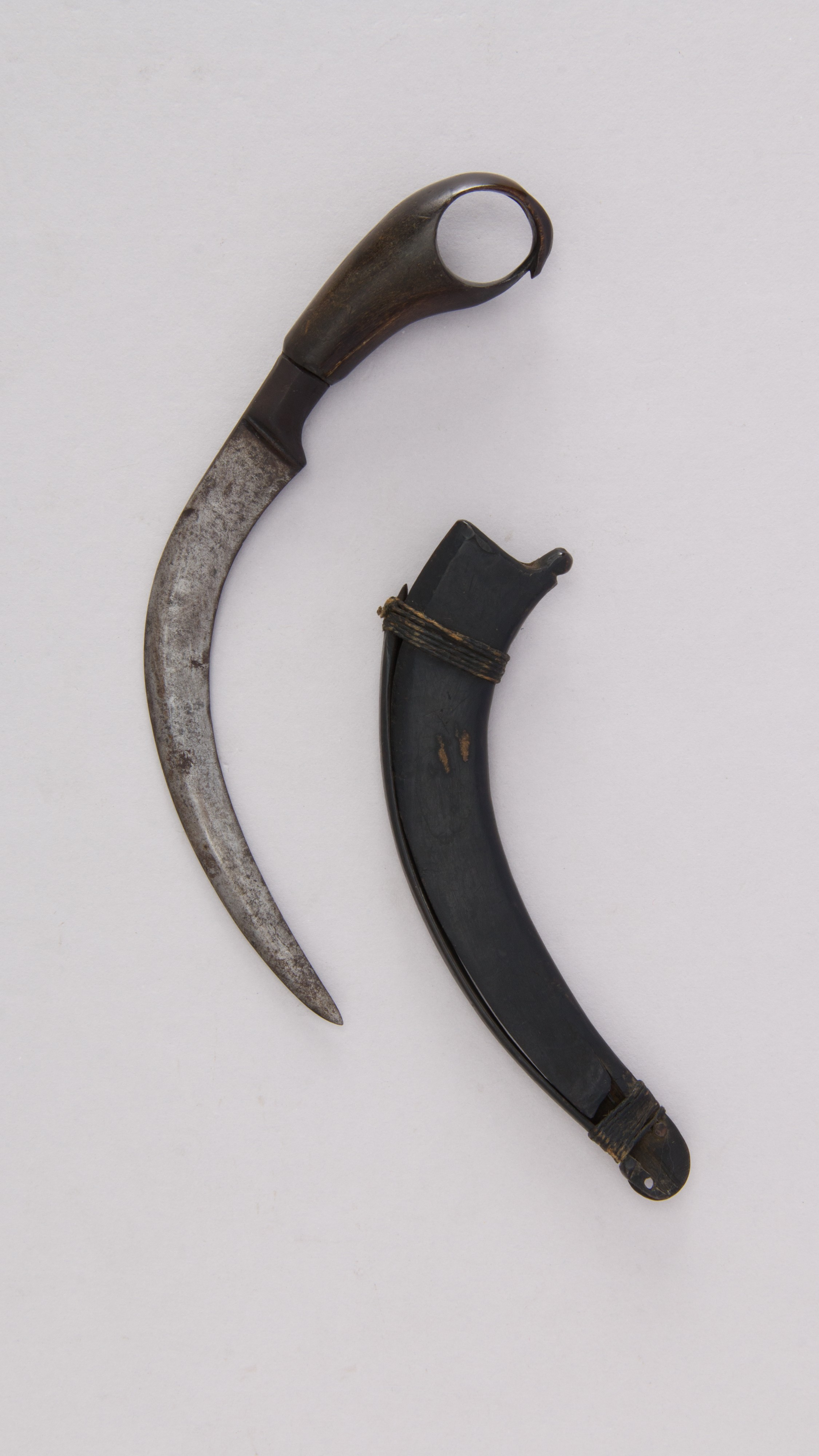
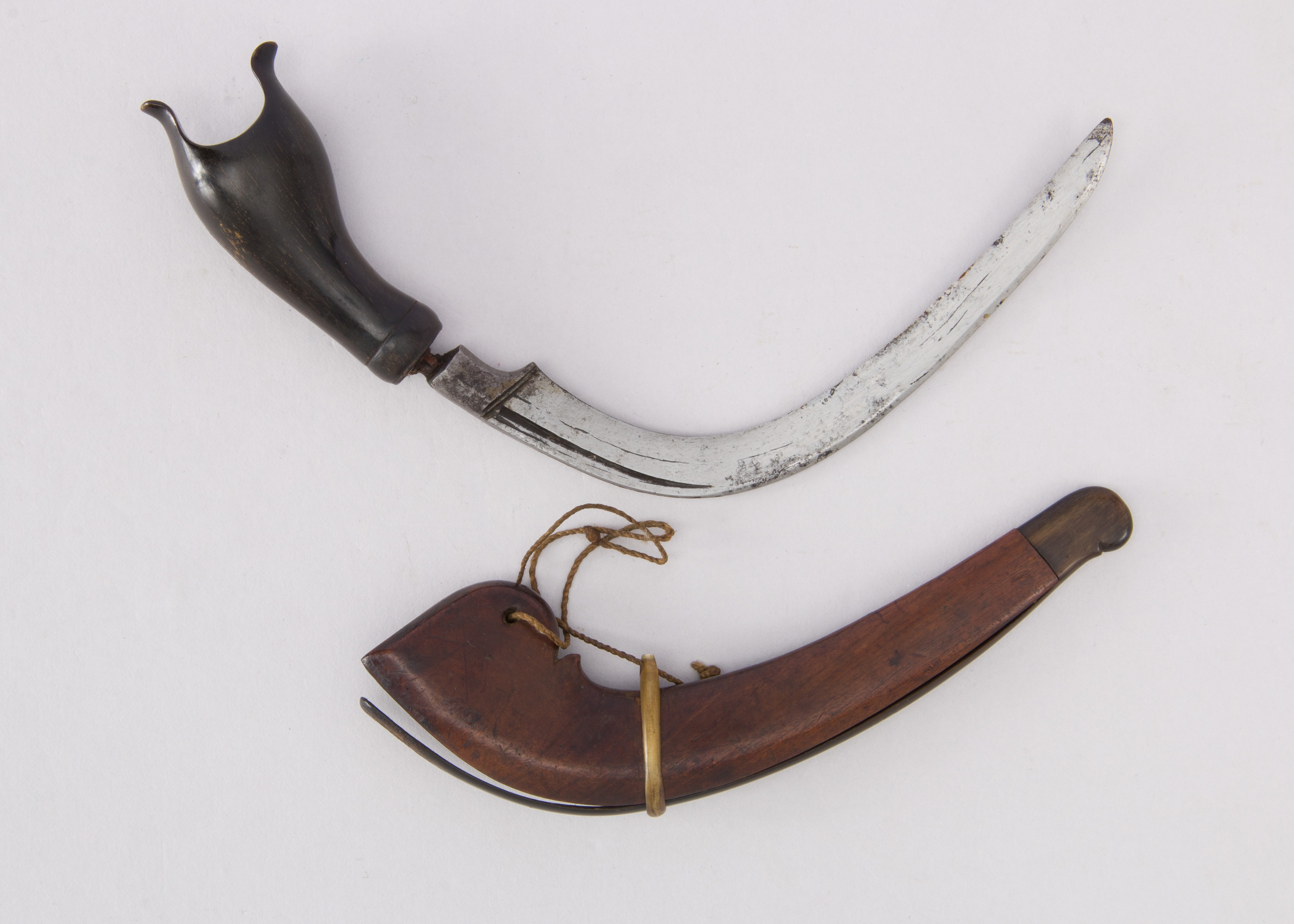
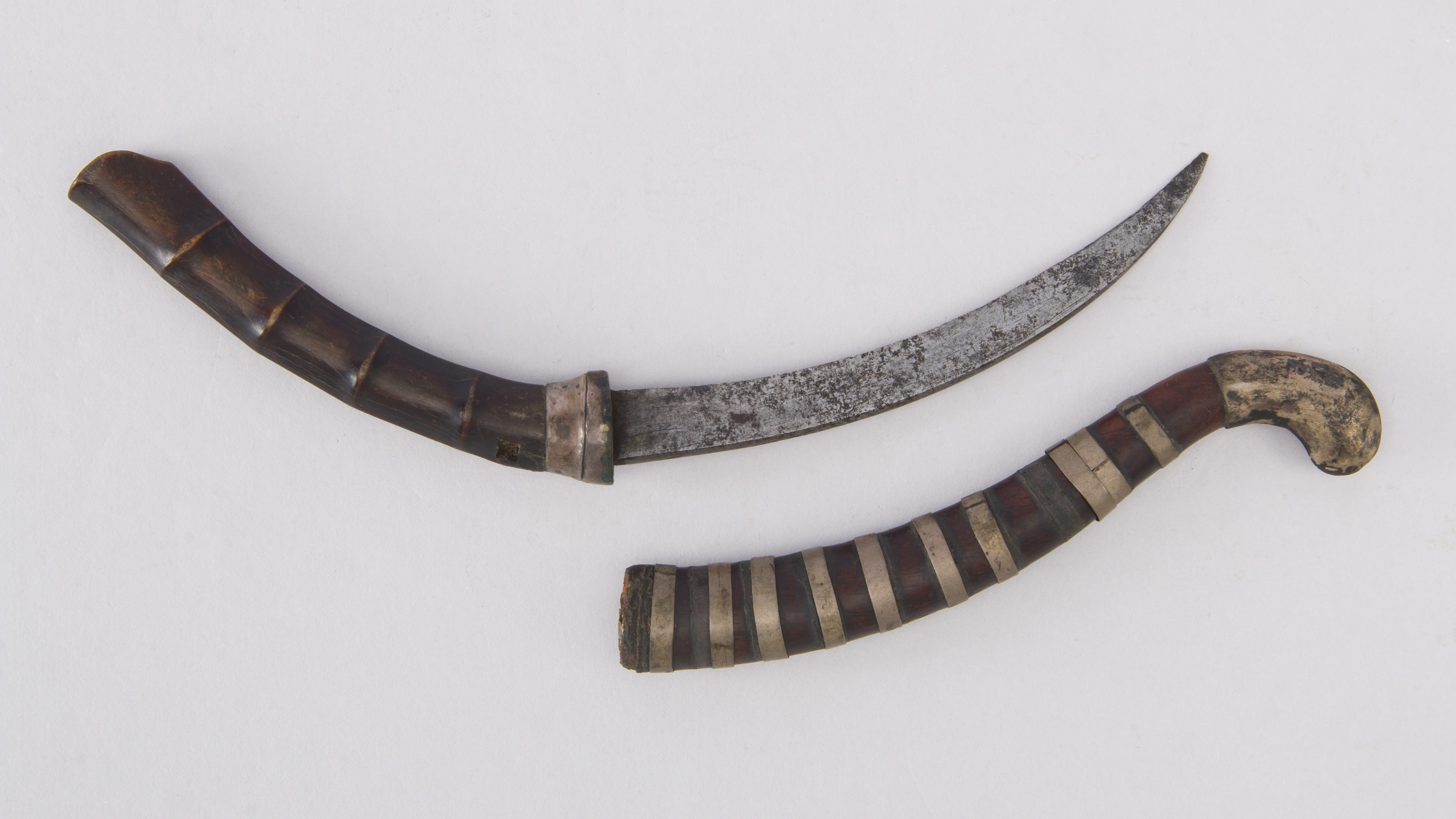
An 18th-19th century Malay-style Karambit (left), an 18th-19th century Sulawesi style Karambit (right) and a 16th-19th century Sumatran style Karambit (bottom).

There are many regional variants of karambit. The length of the blade, for example, could vary from one village or blacksmith to another. Some have no finger guard and some feature two blades, one on each side of the handle.

Traditional types include:

- Kuku Bima: Bhima's claw from West Java
- Kuku Hanuman: Hanuman's claw from West Java
- Kuku Macan: tiger's claw, endemic to Sumatra, Central Java and Madura
- Kerambit Sumbawa: larger, sturdier kerambit made specially for battle. From the Sumba Islands
- Kerambit Lombok: larger, sturdier kerambit made specially for battle. From Lombok
- Lawi Ayam: chicken's claw, created by the Minang community

Superficially, the karambit resembles the jambiyah, although there is no connection.

The jambiyah was always designed as a weapon and serves as a status marker, often made by skilled artisans and jewelers using precious stones and metals, whereas the karambit was and still remains an unadorned farmer's implement and utility knife.

=== Modern forms ===
The modern Western interpretation of the karambit is far removed from the original agricultural tool.

They may have folding blades, are finished to a high standard, made from expensive materials as opposed to being rudimentary and makeshift and are generally larger to accommodate larger hands giving it pure shape.

Additionally, modern karambit may have spikes or spurs on the front or rear ricasso, which may be intended for gripping clothing or horse tack, tearing flesh or for injecting a poison, such as the upas.

=== In popular culture ===
- The Medjai (Pharaoh's Bodyguards) are seen, using the karambit, in the film The Mummy (1999 film)
- Jalil Naciri used a karambit when playing AIi in Taken.
- Keanu Reeves used a karambit when playing the title character in John Wick: Chapter 3 – Parabellum.
- Agnez Mo and Anggun used karambits when playing Lila Hoth and Amisha Hoth respectively in season 4 of Reacher.
- Karambits appear in the Far Cry franchise, most notably in Far Cry 5 and Far Cry 6.
- Cecep Arif Rahman wielded two karambits when playing the Assassin in The Raid 2.
- Karambit Warriors are the unique units of the Malay in Age of Empires II HD: Rise of the Rajas and Age of Empires II: Definitive Edition.
- A karambit was shown among the arsenal own by the title character in the 2024 film Kraven the Hunter.
- Yasmine is a playable character in Street Fighter 6 that wields a crescent-shaped karambit knife.
- The karambit knife is one of the most sought-after in-game cosmetics (skins) in Counter-Strike: Global Offensive and its sequel, Counter-Strike 2.

== See also ==
- Bagh nakh
- List of Indonesian inventions and discoveries
- Mark I trench knife
- Srbosjek
