= Pauls Toutonghi =

American novelist

Pauls Harijs Toutonghi
- Born: 1976 (age 49–50); Seattle, Washington
- Education: Middlebury College BA; Cornell University PhD
- Occupations: Academic; writer
- Spouse: Peyton Marshall
- Children: 2
- Writing career
- Years active: 2000—present
- Notable awards: Pushcart Prize, 2000
- Website: paulstoutonghi.com

Pauls Harijs Toutonghi (born 1976) is a first-generation American fiction and non-fiction writer. He was born in Seattle, Washington, to immigrant parents. His mother emigrated from Latvia, his father emigrated from Egypt and was of Syrian descent.

His first novel, Red Weather, was published by Random House/Shaye Areheart Books in 2006. His second, Evel Knievel Days, was published by Random House/Crown in 2012.

Red Weather was widely—and favorably—reviewed. Toutonghi has published work in Sports Illustrated, The Burnside Review, Glimmer Train, The Boston Review, One Story Magazine, and The New Yorker. His story, "Regeneration" won a Pushcart Prize in 2000. His 2016 non-fiction narrative, Dog Gone: A Lost Pet's Extraordinary Journey and the Family Who Brought Him Home, was the source for the 2023 Netflix film, Dog Gone.

Toutonghi received his MFA in poetry from Cornell University in 2003, followed by a PhD in English Literature in 2006. After his first novel was published, he moved from Brooklyn, New York to Portland, Oregon, where he now teaches as a Professor of English at Lewis and Clark College, specializing in Fiction and Creative Nonfiction Writing.

== Works ==
=== Fiction ===
==== Short stories ====
- Regeneration. The Boston Review, 2000
- Homecoming. The Boston Review, 2001
- Live Cargo. Livingston Press, 2003

==== Novels ====
- Red Weather. Random House, 2006
- Evel Knievel Days. Random House, 2012
- The Refugee Ocean. Simon & Schuster, 2023

=== Non-fiction ===
==== Books ====
- Dog Gone: A Lost Pet's Extraordinary Journey and the Family Who Brought Him Home. Knopf, 2016

==== Essays ====
- 9 Sencu Iela. The Virginia Quarterly Review, 2009
- My First Early Success. The Quivering Pen, 2012
- Our Father’s Body: An Egyptian refugee, the construction of whiteness, and what the U.S. census leaves out. The New Yorker, 2020

== Personal life ==
He is married to the writer Peyton Marshall, and is the father of twins. His sister, Annette Toutonghi, is a professional actor. His father, Joseph Toutonghi, died in December 2017.
