= The Passenger (2023 American film) =

American thriller film by Carter Smith

- Release poster
- Directed by: Carter Smith
- Written by: Jack Stanley
- Produced by: Paige Pemberton; Paul Uddo
- Starring: Kyle Gallner; Johnny Berchtold; Liza Weil
- Cinematography: Lyn Moncrief
- Edited by: Eric Nagy
- Music by: Christopher Bear
- Production company: Blumhouse Television
- Distributed by: MGM+
- Release date: August 4, 2023
- Running time: 93 minutes
- Country: United States
- Language: English

The Passenger is a 2023 American thriller film directed by Carter Smith and written by Jack Stanley. The film stars Kyle Gallner and Johnny Berchtold. Jason Blum serves as an executive producer through his Blumhouse Television banner. The film was released digitally by MGM+ on August 4, 2023, to positive reviews.

== Plot ==
Randolph "Randy" Bradley is a fast food worker in rural Louisiana who is slated to be promoted to manager, yet still submits to bullying by coworkers Chris and Jess. Another coworker, Benson, sees Randy being bullied and intervenes. After being threatened by Chris to not interfere, Benson retrieves a double-barrelled shotgun from his car and kills everyone in the building except Randy. Randy reluctantly helps Benson clean the bloody scene, they place the bodies in the freezer, and they close the restaurant early.

The duo drive to a nearby diner, where Randy asks why Benson committed the shooting spree. Benson's response is to insult their waitress, saying that she hasn’t done anything remarkable in her life; Benson explains that he sees potential in Randy as someone who can achieve more, and says he thinks Randy is "fixable". Benson takes Randy to Benson's mother's house to give her some food and cigarettes. When Randy goes to get a phone for his disabled mother upon her request, Benson pins Randy against the wall and rebukes his mother. They return to Benson's car, where Benson says that he has to hurt Randy to make him learn and sets up a rule that he does only what is necessary for Randy.

With Benson set on curing Randy of his indecisiveness, they head to a mall to talk to Randy’s ex-girlfriend, Lisa, at her workplace, because Randy never fully understood why his last relationship ended. Lisa explains that their breakup was due to Randy's apathy. At the parking lot, Randy then explains to Benson why his mother had him repeat second grade due to an incident with his former teacher, Miss Beard, in which he flung an eraser into her eye in anger after feeling mistreated by her, and how it ruined both their lives: Miss Beard eventually lost her eye and was mocked by students and faculty for her disfigurement; and Randy ended up suppressing his feelings throughout his life since then, due to the traumatic memory of his emotions harming others. Randy's submissive behavior is further shown by a brief phone call he has with his mother, who Benson concludes micromanages Randy after listening in.

Benson then drives Randy to the school where Miss Beard works to get her home address so Randy can reconcile with his regret. Benson recognizes the vice principal as he is leaving the office and interacts with him briefly to confirm his identity; the principal was his former third-grade teacher. Benson then follows the vice principal outside and viciously beats him, but Randy stops the beating because of the rule Benson set for Randy.

At Miss Beard's house, Randy learns that she does not blame him for the accident and that the direction in which her life went ultimately ended on a positive note despite her missing eye. As their meeting comes to a close, Miss Beard receives a phone call from the elementary school and she is told about the vice principal's ultimately fatal beating. She mentions the assault to Randy and Benson before seeing Benson's freshly injured knuckles. Benson then pulls his gun on Miss Beard, but Randy tells Benson not to kill her, after which Benson takes Miss Beard hostage and plans to drive out of the city.

The three return to the diner from earlier and, while in the restroom, Randy calls the police. They are confronted by the waitress from earlier; still angered by Benson’s insult, she berates him until Benson shoots her in the leg. Randy tries to stop Benson, and they hear the sound of police sirens. Thinking Miss Beard called the police, Benson attempts to shoot her, but instead shoots Randy in the shoulder as he is in the way. Benson quickly goes to help Randy, and Randy confesses he was the one who called the police, having stolen Mrs. Beard's flip phone from her house. Accepting that his spree has come to an end, Benson reflects on his apathy and listlessness towards life having begun in his early years, then walks outside and commits suicide by cop. Sometime later, Randy plays with Mrs. Beard's daughter as she arrives home and he lays a firm boundary with his overbearing mother over the phone, showing that he is finally happy and has control over his own life.

== Cast ==
- Johnny Berchtold as Randolph Bradley
- Kyle Gallner as Benson
- Liza Weil as Miss Beard
- Billy Slaughter as Hardy
- Matthew Laureano as Chris
- Jordan Sherley as Jess
- Kanesha Washington as Marsha
- Lupe Leon as Lisa
- Merah Benoit as Tessa

== Production ==
In March 2022, The Passenger was announced as part of Blumhouse Television and Epix's TV movie deal, with Carter Smith directing with Jack Stanley writing the screenplay, with Kyle Gallner, Johnny Berchtold and Liza Weil starring in the film. Principal photography on the film began in April 2022 in New Orleans.

== Release ==
The Passenger was released digitally by MGM+ and Paramount Home Entertainment on August 4, 2023 and started streaming on MGM+ on October 6, 2023.

== Reception ==
On the review aggregator website Rotten Tomatoes, 88% of 24 critics' reviews are positive, with an average rating of 6.4/10. Metacritic, which uses a weighted average, assigned the film a score of 62 out of 100, based on 8 critics, indicating "generally favorable" reviews.
