= Snow Falls (film) =

2023 American horror film

- Promotional release poster
- Directed by: Colton Tran
- Written by: Luke Genton
- Story by: Colton Tran; Laura M. Young
- Produced by: Laura M. Young
- Starring: Victoria Moroles; Anna Grace Barlow; Johnny Berchtold
- Cinematography: Michael Dean Greenwood
- Edited by: Colton Tran
- Music by: Jonathan Martinez
- Distributed by: Lionsgate Home Entertainment
- Release date: January 17, 2023
- Running time: 79 minutes
- Country: United States
- Language: English

Snow Falls is a 2023 American horror film directed by Colton Tran and starring Victoria Moroles, Anna Grace Barlow, and Johnny Berchtold. The film's plot follows a group of friends who, while spending New Year's Eve at a remote cabin, struggle to stay sane when they become stranded by a snowstorm.

Snow Falls was released on video-on-demand (VOD) and digital platforms on January 17, 2023.

== Plot ==
A group of friends -- couple Andy and Em, Kit, River, and Eden -- travel to the fictional ski town of Snow Falls to stay at the remote cabin owned by River's family for New Year's Eve. They initially plan to stay only overnight, but a sudden winter storm forces them to stay longer than expected. Though they are initially unconcerned, drinking and partying as usual, the situation becomes more serious when the power in the cabin goes out and does not return as expected.

As the days pass, the situation becomes more desperate. Low on food and firewood, Eden, who is studying to be a doctor, advises the group to ration their supplies, bundle up on clothing, and avoid sleeping, as they might become hypothermic and perish in the cold. However, this causes the group to gradually begin hallucinating, eventually convincing River and Em that the snow falling outside is poisoned, and they are all infected by virtue of having consumed it while partying earlier. As a result, River empties their vehicle of gasoline, convinced that they need to contain their "sickness," while Em wanders outside without outerwear and later opens up her stomach with a shard of a broken mirror, believing that she can get the "sickness" out, though she survives.

Andy begins chopping wooden furniture in the cabin for firewood to help warm the severely wounded Em, which River had been adamant against doing since the house is full of antiques. This causes a fight between them, and River accidentally kills Andy when the latter hits his head. Realizing how dire the situation is, Kit volunteers to head out into the storm to find help. As River and Eden prepare hot water, a delirious and underclothed Em decides to try to see how much gasoline the car has left, but dies of exposure shortly after entering it. Devastated, River and Eden try to set out after Kit, only to discover that he had died of exposure shortly after leaving the house.

The two return to the cabin, unsure how they will survive if the storm continues. River hallucinates Eden seducing him and strips off his clothes before taking a cold shower, which kills him. As a frantic Eden finds his body, the power to the cabin returns. Horrified, she realizes that the entire group was only a few hours away from salvation, and she waits outside as emergency services arrive.

== Cast ==
- Colton Tran as Kit
- Victoria Moroles as Em
- James Gaisford as Andy
- Johnny Berchtold as River
- Anna Grace Barlow as Eden
- Jonathan Bennett
- Patrick Fabian

== Reception ==
Marco Vito Oddo of Collider gave the film a grade of "D", criticizing a perceived lack of characterization and frightening horror elements, and concluding: "Snow Falls wastes a compelling premise with a dull script, without complex characters or effective scares to elevate the story." Brian Costello of Common Sense Media gave the film 2/5 stars, writing, "The lack of heat and the lack of sleep leads to delirium and hallucinations, and while it almost gets close to doing something creative with the story, the whole thing comes across as formulaic, with jump scares galore, cheesy hallucinations, and unsatisfying plot twists."
