= Victoria Moroles =

American actress (born 1996)

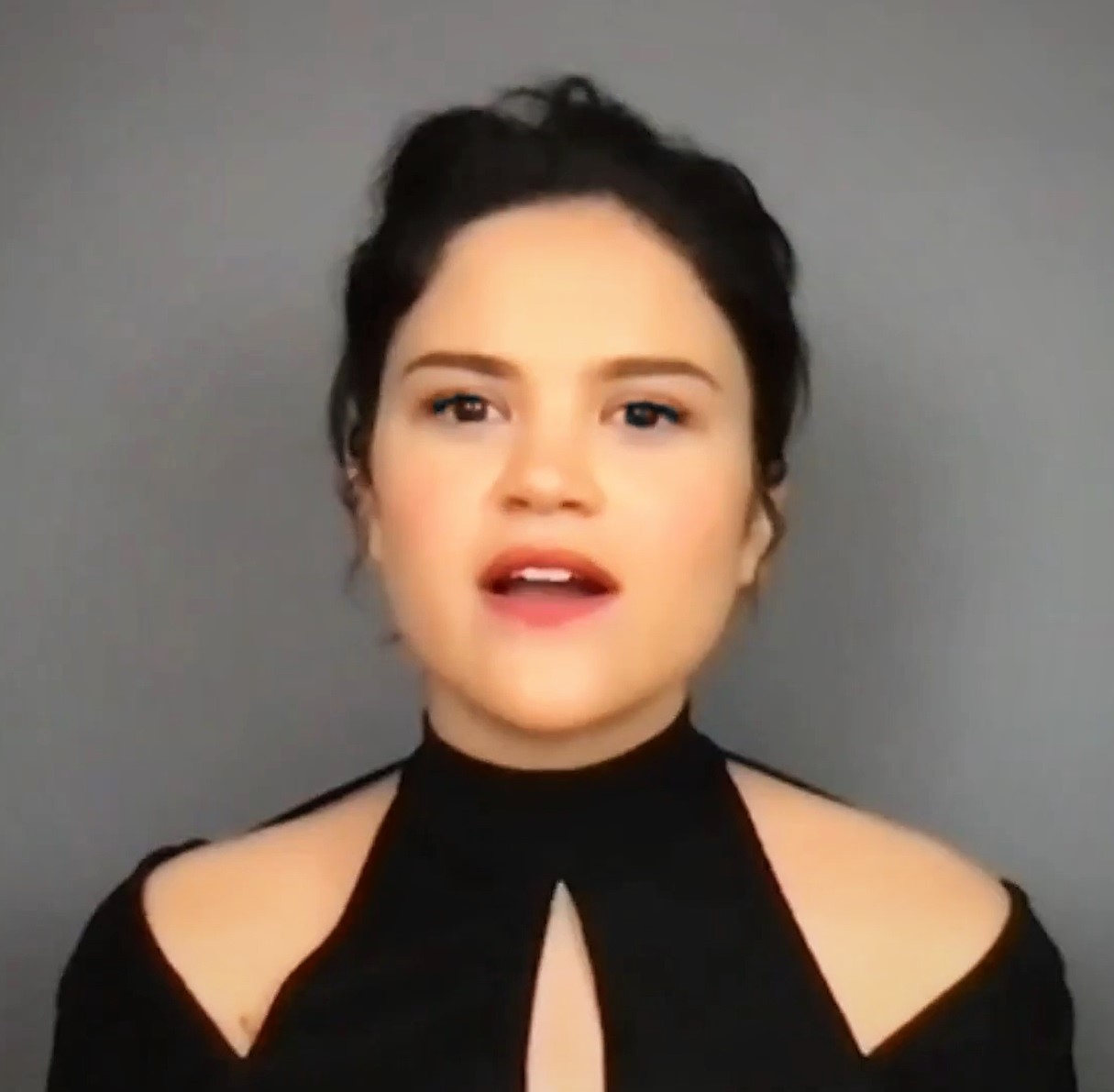
- Moroles in 2021
- Born: September 4, 1996 (age 29); Corpus Christi, Texas, U.S.
- Occupations: Actress; dancer
- Years active: 2009–present

Victoria Moroles (born September 4, 1996) is an American actress. She played Andie on the Disney Channel show Liv and Maddie. She has also played Hayden Romero on MTV's Teen Wolf in seasons 5 and 6 (2015–2017) and Margot in several episodes of Never Have I Ever. She also starred in the Hulu comedy Plan B, directed by Natalie Morales.

== Biography ==
Moroles was born in Corpus Christi, Texas. She left Texas during her middle school years to follow her dreams in Los Angeles. In 2014, Moroles appeared as Pia in the Disney Channel Original Movie Cloud 9 starring Dove Cameron and Luke Benward, which was premiered on January 17, 2014.

Moroles joined cast to play the recurring role of Andie Bustamante in the comedy series Liv and Maddie and also the recurring role as Hayden Romero in the supernatural teen drama Teen Wolf, based on the 1985 film of the same name.

In 2018, Moroles co-starred as in the supernatural horror film Down a Dark Hall directed by Rodrigo Cortés, based on the 1974 novel of the same name by Lois Duncan.

In 2021, Moroles starred in the coming-of-age comedy film Plan B alongside Kuhoo Verma, directed by Natalie Morales, which was released on May 28, 2021, by Hulu.

In 2022, Moroles was cast to play the lead role in the action adventure podcast series Bloodthirsty Hearts alongside Sofia Bryant, Gus Birney, Sivan Alyra Rose and Cheyenne Haynes, where she played the role of Susu. On the same year, Moroles co-starred Noah Segan in the horror film Blood Relatives as Jane, which was released on November 22, 2022. Moroles played the recurring role of Margot Ramos in the comedy-drama series Never Have I Ever.

In 2023, Moroles co-starred Colton Tran in the horror film Snow Falls, where she played the main role of Em, which was released on January 17, 2023.

== Filmography ==
=== Film ===
Year	Title	Role	Notes
2009	Liberty Lane	Wendy	Short film
2010	The Wicked Waltz	Girl	Short film
2011	The Faithful	Mary	Short film
2011	Maddoggin'	Violet Diaz	Short film
2013	The First Hope	Brittany	Short film
2016	Is That a Gun in Your Pocket?	Paula	
2017	Spook	Cartoon Host	
2018	Down a Dark Hall	Veronica	
2019	Killer Date	Chelsea	Short film
2021	Plan B	Lupe	
2022	Blood Relatives	Jane	
2023	Snow Falls	Em	
2026	The Only Living Pickpocket in New York	Eve	

=== Television ===
Year	Title	Role	Notes
2012	CSI: Crime Scene Investigation	Rosa Flores	Episode: "Wild Flowers"
2014	Cloud 9	Pia	Disney Channel Original Movie
2014	Legends	Teenage Girl	Episode: "Gauntlet"
2015–2017	Liv and Maddie	Andie Bustamante	Recurring role; 12 episodes
2015–2017	Teen Wolf	Hayden Romero	Recurring role (seasons 5–6A); 24 episodes
2016	Sleep Tight		Television mini-series
2018	Here and Now	Carla	2 episodes
2021	Go Off with Jess & Julissa	Olivia	Episode: "Joe Goldberg Gets Stalked"
2022–2023	Never Have I Ever	Margot Ramos	Recurring role; 9 episodes
2022	The Wilds	Marisol	Episode: "Day 34/12"
2022	Tuca & Bertie		Episode: "Screech Leeches"
2022	Bloodthirsty Hearts	Susu	Main role; 8 episodes
2024	Grey's Anatomy	Sophia Valdez	Episode: S20 E5 Never Felt So Alone
2025	Ballard	Martina Castro	Main role; 10 episodes
