= Mother, May I? (film) =

- Theatrical release poster
- Directed by: Laurence Vannicelli
- Screenplay by: Laurence Vannicelli
- Story by: Daisy Long; Laurence Vannicelli
- Produced by: Bogdan George Apetri; Daisy Long; Holland Roden; Cole Eckerle; Dane Eckerle; Daniel Brandt
- Starring: Holland Roden; Kyle Gallner; Chris Mulkey
- Cinematography: Craig Harmer
- Edited by: Keola Racela
- Music by: Marc Riordan
- Production companies: Bad Grey; Cine Primo; Burn Later; Slow Brink
- Distributed by: Dark Sky Films
- Release dates: April 23, 2023 (Fantasy Filmfest); July 21, 2023 (United States)
- Running time: 99 minutes
- Country: United States
- Language: English
- Budget: <$1 million
- Box office: $21,608

Mother, May I? is a 2023 American psychological horror film written and directed by Laurence Vannicelli from a story he conceived with his partner Daisy Long. It stars Holland Roden, Kyle Gallner, and Chris Mulkey and is about a woman who starts behaving like her fiancé's recently deceased mother. The film premiered at Fantasy Filmfest on April 23, 2023, and opened in the United States on July 21, 2023. It received generally positive reviews from critics.

== Premise ==
Emmett and Anya are an engaged couple who participate in a therapy game where they pretend to be each other to share their feelings. After Emmett takes Anya to the house he inherited after his mother's death, which he plans to sell, she starts acting like his mother, whom she never met and he resents.

== Cast ==
- Holland Roden as Anya
- Kyle Gallner as Emmett
- Chris Mulkey as Bill
- Daphne Gaines as a realtor
- Michael Giannone as a mortician

== Production ==
Writer-director Laurence Vannicelli and producer Daisy Long conceived the story for the film during the COVID-19 pandemic while brainstorming ideas for a performance-driven project with a small cast; the two later married. Lead actress Holland Roden was involved early in the production as a producer and gave notes on the script, which pulled from the Buddhist principle of bardo. The film was shot on a tight five-week schedule. Adamant about shooting the film on-location in upstate New York, Roden scoured thousands of houses across five states on Airbnb; Vannicelli ultimately located the converted dairy barn that serves as the film's principal location. The cast and crew, "12 people on any given day", rented the farmhouse; most of them lived in it throughout the production to avoid the risk of having to shut down because of COVID, with Roden and Gallner sleeping in their characters' rooms. "It was really hard work," Vannicelli recalled, "but we did French days, which was two hours shorter. We had longer evenings, and me and the DP would just basically face plant after the day, but everyone else would just hang out and talk and drink wine, and even though I was too exhausted to participate, it made me so happy to see that people enjoyed the experience of shooting enough that they wanted to continue to hang out." He and cinematographer Craig Harmer pulled from 1970s American cinema and were influenced by filmmaker John Cassavetes' style of letting the camera run and follow the actors. Vannicelli and Roden both described the experience as a "summer camp". The budget was a low six figures.

== Release ==
The film premiered at Fantasy Filmfest on April 23, 2023. It was released in select theaters in the United States and on digital by Dark Sky Films on July 21, 2023.

== Reception ==
On the review aggregator website Rotten Tomatoes, 83% of 18 critics' reviews are positive, with an average rating of 7.1/10. In a four-star review, The Guardian's Leslie Felperin wrote, "Vannicelli doesn't quite pull everything together in the last act, but there's an immense amount of craft on display as well as some terrific acting from the two leads who play off one another so well." Bloody Disgusting's Joe Lipsett called it "a simmering slow burn, filled with psychosexual tension, quietly devastating moments, and sumptuous visuals." Matt Donato, for Paste, said, "Vannicelli weaponizes therapy-speak where other titles become preachy, uses role-playing as an abusive confusion tactic, and provokes a rather alluring mindf*ck that doesn’t have nor need all the answers to captivate viewers." Noel Murray of the Los Angeles Times concluded, "The movie's 'mommy issues' motif never cuts as deeply as it could ... But as an exhibition of visual style and acting prowess, Mother, May I? is impressive."
