= Sonya Cassidy =

British actress (born 1987)

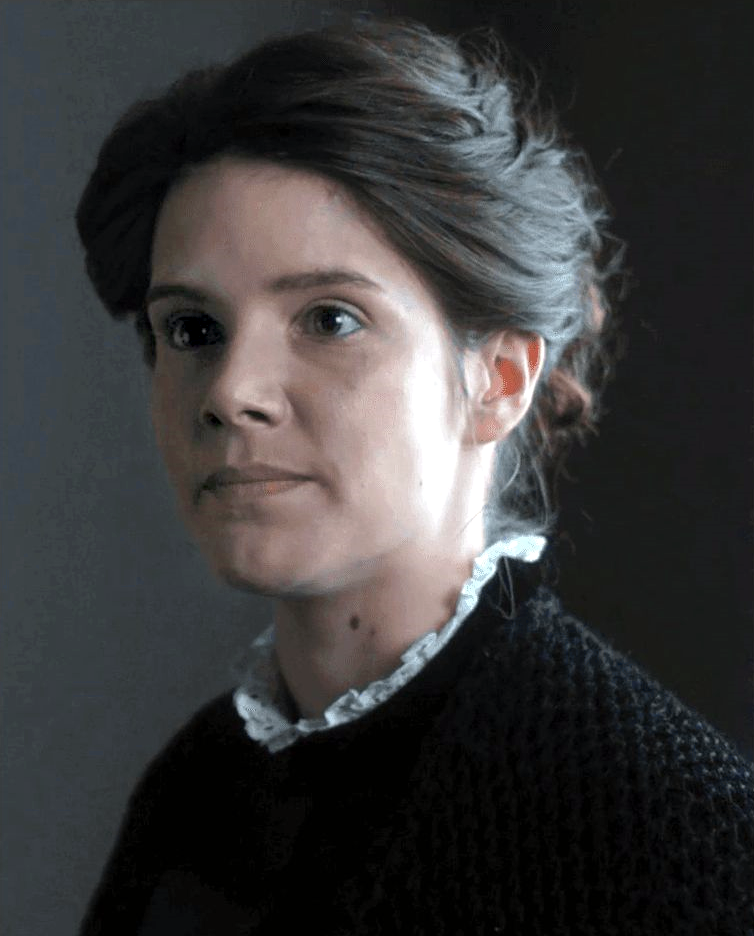
- Cassidy in The Paradise (2012)
- Born: 5 March 1987 (age 39); Bristol, England
- Occupation: Actress
- Years active: 2009–present

Sonya Cassidy (born 5 March 1987) is a British actress. Her credits include The Tudors (2009), The Paradise (2012), Vera (2012–2014), The Great Fire (2014), Survivor (2015), Olympus (2015), Humans (2016), The Woman in White (2018), Lodge 49 (2019), The Last Kingdom (2022), The Man Who Fell to Earth (2022), The Hunt For Raoul Moat (2023), and season 3 of Reacher (2025).

== Career ==
Cassidy attended RADA, graduating with a BA degree in Acting Degree (H Level) in 2008. In 2012, she played Clara in the BBC period drama The Paradise, as Celine Ashworth in the police detective series Vera, and as the Oracle in Syfy fantasy series Olympus. In 2016, she played industrial synth Hester in the Channel 4 science-fiction series Humans, alongside Gemma Chan and Colin Morgan.

Cassidy starred in the AMC television series Lodge 49. She also has some film appearances and has also done theatre work.

In 2022, she starred in the science-fiction series The Man Who Fell to Earth, a television adaptation of the 1963 novel of the same name by Walter Tevis.

== Personal life ==
Cassidy achieved a black belt in Taekwondo.

== Filmography ==
=== Film ===
Year	Title	Role	Notes
2013	The Fifth Estate	Alan's secretary	
2015	Survivor	Helen	
2016	Breaking the Bank	Annabel	

=== Television ===
Year	Title	Role	Notes
2009	Doctors	Ellen Harkness	Episode: "A Bit of What You Fancy"
2009	Lewis	Alison	Episode: "The Quality of Mercy"
2009	The Tudors	Christine, Duchess of Milan	Episode: "Search for a New Queen"
2010	Midsomer Murders	Beatrice Daniels	Episode: "The Made-to-Measure Murders"
2012–2013	The Paradise	Clara	Main cast
2012–2014	Vera	Celine Ashworth	Recurring role (series 2–4)
2013	Endeavour	Joyce Morse	Episode: "Home"
2014	The Great Fire	Catherine of Braganza	Miniseries, main cast
2015	Olympus	Oracle	Main cast
2016	Ripper Street	Leda Starling	Episode: "Some Conscience Lost"
2016	The Rebel	Verity	Episode: "Charity"
2016	Humans	Hester	Recurring role (series 2)
2018	The Woman in White	Countess Fosco	Limited-run series, main cast
2018–2019	Lodge 49	Liz Dudley	Main cast
2020	Soulmates	Allison	Episode: "The Lovers"
2022	The Last Kingdom	Eadgifu	Main cast (series 5) (Note: The role of Eadgifu of Kent is played by Sonya Cassidy in the final season of The Last Kingdom, but by the unrelated Elaine Cassidy in the 2023 sequel film, The Last Kingdom: Seven Kings Must Die.)
2022	The Man Who Fell to Earth	Edie Flood	Main cast
2023	The Hunt For Raoul Moat	Diane Barnwell	
2025	Reacher	Special Agent Susan Duffy	
