= Tom York (actor) =

British actor

- Born: 13 August 1992 (age 34); Hampshire, England
- Education: LAMDA
- Years active: 2014–present

Tom York (born 13 August 1992) is an English actor. He is known for his roles as Samuel "Sam" Carne in the BBC series Poldark (2017–2019) and Hero in the fantasy series Olympus (2015).

== Early life and education ==
York is from Hampshire. His family moved to the Netherlands when he was five, where he took acting classes at the AATG in the Hague. He graduated from London Academy of Music and Dramatic Art (LAMDA).

== Career ==
Before landing the leading role in fantasy TV series Olympus in 2015, York featured as the teenage version of one of the main cast in the first 2 episodes of the TV series Tyrant in 2014. After Olympus, in 2016 York appeared as Mike Maddox in Endeavour, as Mitch McCordell in Midsomer Murders, as Leo Richards in Death in Paradise, and as Zac Leeson in Agatha Raisin. In 2017 he was cast as Sam Carne in the BBC hit series Poldark.

== Filmography ==
=== Television ===
Year	Title	Role	Notes
2014	Tyrant	Teenage Bassan Al-Fayeed	
2015	Olympus	Hero	
2016	Endeavour	Mike Maddox	Episode: "Arcadia"
2016	Midsomer Murders	Mitch McCordell	Episode: "Breaking the Chain"
2016	Death in Paradise	Leo Richards	Episode: "Flames of Love"
2016	Agatha Raisin	Zac Leeson	Episode: "The Day the Floods Came"
2017–2019	Poldark	Samuel "Sam" Carne	
2020	Van Der Valk	Dani Nioh	Episode: "Death in Amsterdam"
2021	American Gods	Colonial Wednesday	Episode: "Conscience of the King"

=== Stage ===
Year	Title	Role	Notes
2020	Corpse!	Evelyn Farrant / Rupert Farrant	Park Theatre

=== Film ===
Year	Title	Role	Notes
2014	The Ivory Year	Piers	Short film
2023	Stopmotion	Tom	
