= Lodge 49 =

American comedy-drama television series

- Genre: Comedy drama; Mystery; Philosophical fiction
- Created by: Jim Gavin
- Starring: Wyatt Russell; Brent Jennings; Sonya Cassidy; Linda Emond; David Pasquesi; Eric Allan Kramer
- Composer: Andrew Carroll
- Country of origin: United States
- Original language: English
- No. of seasons: 2
- No. of episodes: 20

Production
- Executive producers: Paul Giamatti; Dan Carey; Randall Einhorn; Jeff Freilich; Jim Gavin; Peter Ocko
- Production locations: Atlanta, Georgia; Long Beach, California
- Cinematography: Jeffrey Jur
- Editor: Chris McCaleb
- Camera setup: Single-camera
- Running time: 42–56 minutes
- Production companies: Touchy Feely Films; Byrnesy; Ocko & Company; AMC Studios

Original release
- Network: AMC
- Release: August 6, 2018 – October 14, 2019

Lodge 49 is an American comedy-drama television series created by Jim Gavin. It aired on the cable television network AMC in the United States from August 6, 2018, to October 14, 2019, spanning two seasons and 20 episodes. The title alludes to the novella The Crying of Lot 49 by Thomas Pynchon, which Gavin references as an inspiration. Although the series was met with positive reviews, AMC canceled the series after its second season due to low ratings.

== Plot ==
AMC describes the series as a "modern fable set in Long Beach, California, about a disarmingly optimistic local ex-surfer, Dud (Wyatt Russell), who's drifting after the death of his father and collapse of the family business." In the first season, Dud joins a fraternal order known as the Order of the Lynx, hoping the Lodge can put him "on the path to recover the idyllic life he's lost."

== Cast ==
=== Main ===
- Wyatt Russell as Sean "Dud" Dudley, an ex-surfer who discovers Lodge 49 and is looking to lead a happy life.
- Brent Jennings as Ernie Fontaine, a plumbing salesman and member of Lodge 49.
- Sonya Cassidy as Liz Dudley, Dud's twin sister who works as a waitress.
- Linda Emond as Connie Clark, a journalist married to Scott and a member of Lodge 49.
- David Pasquesi as Blaise St. John, a member of Lodge 49 who operates an apothecary and is a philosopher of alchemy.
- Eric Allan Kramer as Scott Miller, a member of Lodge 49 who is married to Connie and serves as a Long Beach Port Harbor patrol officer.

=== Recurring ===
- Kenneth Welsh as Larry Loomis, the Sovereign Protector of Lodge 49.
- Avis-Marie Barnes as Anita Jones, a member of Lodge 49.
- Njema Williams as Big Ben Peters, constable of Lodge 49.
- Jimmy Gonzales as Gil Sandoval, astronomer of Lodge 49.
- Brian Doyle-Murray as Bob Kruger, Ernie's boss at work.
- Daniel Stewart Sherman as Jeremy, Liz's boss at Shamroxx.
- David Ury as Champ, an employee at Shamroxx.
- Atkins Estimond as Gerson, an employee at Shamroxx.
- Hayden Szeto as Corporate, an executive at Omni who dates Liz.
- Joe Grifasi as Burt, a pawnbroker.
- Olivia Sandoval as Janet Price, CEO of Omni.
- Vik Sahay as Tarquin, an executive at Omni.
- Tom Nowicki as Bill Dudley, Dud and Liz's deceased father.
- Adam Godley as Jocelyn Pugh, a member of Lodge 1 in London who comes to Lodge 49.
- Bruce Campbell as Gary "Captain" Green, a general contractor.
- Tyson Ritter as Avery, a fraud who infiltrates Lodge 49.
- Jocelyn Towne as Gloria Keller, an HR manager at Dud's temp job and brief lover.
- Celia Au as Alice Ba, Dud's surfer friend who works at her dad's donut shop.
- Long Nguyen as Paul Ba, Alice's father who owns the local donut shop.
- Sam Puefua as Herman Pola, an associate of pawnbroker Burt.
- Paul Giamatti as L. Marvin Metz, a writer who also narrates audiobooks; Giamatti appears in an uncredited voice-only role in the first season.
- Cheech Marin as El Confidente, a member of Lodge 55 in Mexico.
- Pollyanna McIntosh as Clara, a member of Lodge 1 in London who befriends Connie. (season 2)
- Karen Malina White as Trish, Ernie's ex-wife. (season 2)
- Mary Elizabeth Ellis as Daphne Larson, Dud's pro bono lawyer. (season 2)
- Bronson Pinchot as Dr. Kimbrough, Liz's new shady boss. (season 2)
- Bertila Damas as Lenore, a friend of Liz and Dud's father with whom she had an affair. (season 2)
- Susy Kane as Genevieve, L. Marvin Metz's pyromaniac French muse. (season 2)

== Episodes ==
Season	Episodes	Originally released	
Season	Episodes	First released	Last released
1	10	August 6, 2018	October 8, 2018
2	10	August 12, 2019	October 14, 2019

=== Season 1 (2018) ===
No. overall	No. in season	Title	Directed by	Written by	Original release date	U.S. viewers (millions)
1	1	"As Above, So Below"	Randall Einhorn	Jim Gavin	August 6, 2018	0.690
Ex-surfer Sean "Dud" Dudley finds what appears to be a gold ring with a medieval beast etched onto it. He tries to pawn it, only to learn that it's worthless, but is told that it originated with a fraternal order called Order of the Lynx. Fate and an empty gas tank put him outside a building bearing the ring's lynx emblem. He is greeted by Ernie, a Luminous Knight, who gives him a limited tour and a pamphlet about the order and its home inside Lodge 49. Sensing a connection, Dud joins the order and wants to become a squire and is introduced to the other lodge members. Since he has no home, Dud's sister Liz lets him stay with her, but blames their deceased father for their lot in life. Liz was left in debt after co-signing on a loan. Both the family home and the father's pool supply store, the only place Dud has ever worked, were lost to foreclosure prior to the start of the series.
2	2	"Moments of Truth in Service"	Randall Einhorn	Jim Gavin	August 13, 2018	0.499
In court for trespassing, Dud apologizes to the family who now lives in his old family home and the matter is settled. Liz goes to the bank to discuss the issues of her father's debt of $80,000, which is now her problem. With the Lodge's Sovereign Protector, Larry Loomis, in the hospital, Ernie is next in line for the position. Ernie calls Lodge 1 in London to make it official. Liz wants to hold a funeral for their father, but Dud resists because there is no body. Dud learns from Blaise that the membership fee is actually $200, not $2000 which he paid to Ernie. Dud confronts Ernie about it, who apologizes promising to pay him back. Dud tells him to pay it to lodge as his future dues, and in return, Dud will become a squire and get a key to the Lodge. Ernie and Connie learn that Larry has checked himself out of the hospital.
3	3	"Corpus"	Jake Schreier	Jim Gavin	August 20, 2018	0.451
In a ceremony, Dud pledges allegiance to the Lodge and becomes a squire. Liz is recommended by a co-worker to go to the apothecary and she buys a psychedelic lollipop from Blaise. Dud starts a menial temp job in an office building, filing termination packets. When Liz finds out Dud has taken out another loan she is worried that he doesn't think about the future and is just like their father. The siblings finally decide to hold a funeral service for their father. Connie is fired from her journalism job. Blaise shows Dud a special suite in the Lodge and Blaise inspects Dud's foot injury from when he was bitten by a snake that has not healed. Dud and the office HR manager Gloria begin to connect and she asks about a problem with her pool. After Dud fixes the problem with her pool, she hugs him. Ernie and Connie continue their affair, and she later sees an aura around Ernie's head. At their father's memorial service, Dud gives a speech about alchemy. Later, Dud and Ernie discover a secret room within the Lodge suite and find a corpse dressed in ceremonial clothing.
4	4	"Sunday"	Jake Schreier	Bradley Paul	August 27, 2018	0.445
Dud, Ernie, and the rest of the members inspect the secret room which is filled with books and artifacts. The body is that of a former Sovereign Protector. Ernie and Scott argue over what to do with the body. The Lodge hosts a pancake breakfast for the local Boy Scouts. Liz, bored on her day off, spends the day at her workplace and gets drunk. Dud and Ernie search for Larry, hoping to get answers about the body. Dud reveals to Ernie that he knows about his affair with Connie. Dud and Ernie drive to lot owned by Larry with a mobile home inside, but Larry isn't there. After a conversation with Ernie about being alone, Dud goes to see Gloria. Back at the Lodge, Ernie sees Larry wandering around, then telling Ernie "I'm back".
5	5	"Paradise"	Tricia Brock	Alina Mankin	September 3, 2018	0.409
Ernie and Connie take a break from their relationship. Blaise complains about a parasite worm inside him, though people insist the pain is inside his head. At a Lodge meeting, Larry announces he is stepping down as Sovereign Protector and Ernie is taking his place. Scott, who has been pursuing the position as well, stresses that they should wait for London to make it official, but Larry disagrees. Dud brings Gloria to Shamroxx to meet Liz, and Liz comments on their age difference. During a speech at the Lodge, Blaise's parasite worm comes out of his nose. Liz turns down an offer to move to an executive position at corporate. Gloria confesses to Dud that she wishes her catatonic mother would die so she can move on with her life. They then end their relationship amicably. Back at Liz's apartment, she and Dud have an argument over whether their father committed suicide or not. Dud tells her, "He didn't want to die. But, "you do" and leaves. At Ernie's promotion ceremony, Larry walks in naked and confused.
6	6	"The Mysteries"	Tricia Brock	Charles Yu	September 10, 2018	0.363
Larry remembers his time at the Lodge when he was a young child. In Larry's trailer, Dud and Ernie question Larry's mental health, referring to the previous night. Dud collects his belongings from Liz's apartment and moves out after their fight the previous night. They apologize to each other for the fight, but Liz tells Dud she's worried about him. Dud responds by telling her she's comfortable being unhappy and living "in the dark". Jocelyn Pugh, the emissary from London begins his flight to California, running into several obstacles. Dud starts his next temp job, working overnight security with one of Liz's co-workers from Shamroxx. Ernie ends his affair with Connie since their relationship is going nowhere. Larry tells Ernie that he believes Dud is special and has a connection to the Lodge. Liz reconsiders the executive position at corporate. A man, who saw the news of the corpse at Lodge, pretends to be the emissary and infiltrates the Lodge. At the end of the day after spending it with Ernie, Larry peacefully dies.
7	7	"The Solemn Duty of the Squire"	Minkie Spiro	Jim Gavin	September 17, 2018	0.355
The Lodge members honor Larry with a game of softball. Dud gets a second temp job, answering phones for a local company. Blaise begins a sexual relationship with Avery, but is unaware he's impersonating the emissary. Avery expresses his interest in the Lodge's historical books. Liz goes to corporate for her interview, and despite making a good impression, she leaves once she learns a background check will be performed. The man from corporate goes to Liz's apartment and asks why she left and she reveals she has a felony from her past; they later have dinner together. The real emissary, Jocelyn Pugh, finally arrives at the Lodge and Avery revealed to be a fraud, runs off. Jocelyn reveals to Ernie that Larry had been stealing money from the Lodge and that he purchased a mortgage loan from a Chinese bank and that a balloon payment of $300,000 is due. Jocelyn believes that the Lodge will have to be foreclosed. Ernie finally finds the location of "Captain", a general contractor he and his plumbing business have been searching for in a lone trailer in the desert, which happens to be the location of Dud's newest temp job.
8	8	"Something From Nothing"	Michael Trim	Brad Caleb Kane	September 24, 2018	0.334
Dud introduces Ernie to Captain, whose name is Gary – a recently divorced drunk. Ernie hopes to close a deal with Gary on his massive construction job. When the three hit it off and, over dinner, Gary expresses interest when Dud tells him about the Lodge. The three go to a cockfight, where they win $3500 each. The next morning, Gary closes the deal with Ernie. Liz starts the executive training program at Omni and is on her way to a full-time salaried career. Connie's undisclosed illness grows worse and she revisits her old high school; Scott comes to pick her up when she can't drive. Gary takes Dud to his ex-wife's house, which he breaks into because he's been kicked out. When Ernie arrives, Gary reveals he is not Captain, who doesn't actually exist, and that he is just a patsy in a land deal scheme; the land is toxic, but there is oil underground. Gary does have a plan of his own, and wants Dud and Ernie to invest with him; in exchange, Gary will save the Lodge by paying its debt. Avery spies on them from the bushes outside the house. Back at the Lodge, Scott asks Ernie to start sleeping with Connie again.
9	9	"Apogee"	Michael Trim	Peter Ocko	October 1, 2018	0.280
The Lodge hosts a public band night, where Dud makes a connection with Emily, a girl who works at the library. Dud later makes a rousing speech about the importance of the Lodge. When Ernie and Connie have a tryst, he tells her Scott knows about their affair; she decides to leave their motel room, knowing the damage she has caused. Liz's executive training program takes her to a luxury yacht, where Omni's CEO, Janet, calls Liz a natural leader and wants her to on the executive team. Liz's reaction is to jump overboard and swim to shore. Dud and Ernie go to meet Gary to secure their deal, but they worry when he doesn't show up. When Avery hovers a drone over their vehicle, they drive off and hide in the motel room. Scott shows up at the motel looking for Connie, so Ernie and Dud sneak out the back. They go to Gary's house and find him tied up by Avery, who holds them hostage with a harpoon. Avery escapes and Gary ends up falling off the balcony, impaling his eye on the horn of a narwhal, putting him in the hospital.
10	10	"Full Fathom Five"	Randall Einhorn	Jim Gavin	October 8, 2018	0.307
Dud has his car repossessed by Burt and buys a bike from the pawn shop. Ernie loses his accounts at work after the debacle with Captain. Liz goes to corporate acting as if nothing happened regarding her jumping off the ship, but it doesn't work out. Liz goes back to Shamroxx, but finds out she has been replaced. Ernie gives advice to Dud to start planning his life long-term and to not end up like him. Dud goes to the temp agency and begins a training program to find a career. Dud and Liz have a conversation in the abandoned pool shop about their father and that they need to accept that they'll never know what happened to him. Ernie and Scott argue over who's sovereign protector and have a fight in the Lodge. Scott reveals to Ernie that Connie has brain seizures and doesn't know where she is. Ernie receives a call from Connie, who is at Lodge 1 in London, and tells him she's taking time for herself. Connie asks the members of Lodge 1 about the "true Lodge" and the secret scrolls. A woman from Lodge 1 walks down a long hallway to a door, and tells someone "We have a problem". Jocelyn, who has been having a great time in California and at Lodge 49, pleads to London to keep it open despite its financial problems; he later receives word it will stay open because of his efforts. Liz goes to the bank and tells them she'll be dead before she'll be debt-free. The bank agrees to take all her money, $18,000, and closes her account. Blaise discovers a secret alchemy bag in the wall with gold residue in it. Ernie discovers a secret hatch in the Lodge that leads to Larry's old trailer and finds El Confidente waiting for him. Dud finally decides to get back into the water to go surfing, but he is bitten by a shark. He is rescued by other surfers and sees a vision of his father.

=== Season 2 (2019) ===
No. overall	No. in season	Title	Directed by	Written by	Original release date	U.S. viewers (millions)
11	1	"All Circles Vanish"	Jake Schreier	Jim Gavin	August 12, 2019	0.246
In a flashforward, Dud and Ernie parachute out a crashing plane after obtaining the scrolls. Six weeks earlier, Dud recovers in the hospital from the shark attack and is released. At work, Ernie's performance is lacking and is told by his supervisor Bob that he may be relegated to desk duty. While in the secret library, Blaise asks Dud to be apprentice, which he happily accepts. Liz, now jobless and feeling depressed, searches for work at the temp agency, where she sees her old boss Jeremy also looking for work. Jeremy tells Liz that Shamroxx was condemned due to rat infestation. Liz gets a job working for Dr. Kimbrough, a shady account, and is told to shred files. Dud is approached by Daphne Larson, a law provider who offers her services pro bono, who plans on suing the city for his shark attack. At a Lodge meeting, Scott announces that everyone must pay their bar tabs because the Lodge is in financial trouble. At Lodge 1 in England, Connie talks with Clara about how she sees things that aren't always there; Clara suggests to Connie that she should speak with her boss. Dud goes to Ernie's house to confront him about his absence and that he didn't visit him at the hospital. Ernie tells Dud he's done "chasing shadows" and just wants a normal life. A new family, Greg and Greta and their son Booie, have taken over the old Dudley pool store, now called Pool Party. At first, Dud is fine with it and offers his services, but later, he steals the pool cleaning equipment out of Booie's truck and takes off.
12	2	"The Slide"	Jake Schreier	Jim Gavin	August 19, 2019	0.227
Dud and Ernie have made up and Ernie agrees to drive Dud around with his pool supplies to potential customers, and even offers his services for free, taking customers away from Pool Party. Ernie is put on the orders desk at his work after he loses his cool with a big client during a golf outing. Liz is back with an old boyfriend, who is staying with her and Dud, which annoys Dud. Liz's new boss, Dr. Kimbrough, is arrested by the FBI. At Lodge 1, Connie, who is blindfolded, speaks with Clara's boss Melinda. Dud goes through his father's Rolodex to find old clients, and he goes to the house of Lenore, who knew his father. While there, Booie arrives and attacks Dud with a pool skimmer. Liz comes and picks up Dud. Liz, who is sick and tired of the Dudley's being pushed around, races to Pool Party and smashes into Booie's truck. Booie then tries to run over Dud. Burt, the pawnshop owner, brokers a deal where Dud will not press charges in exchange for the family giving up their lease. At the lodge, Dud tries to cheer up a depressed Ernie by them getting drunk. Waking the next morning at the lodge, Dud sees El Confidente's van and Ernie decides to tell Dud what happened in Mexico.
13	3	"DisOrientation"	Michael Trim	Bradley Paul	August 26, 2019	0.250
Ernie tells Dud what happened in Mexico. In flashbacks, Ernie and El Confidente travel to Mexico, and El Confidente brings Ernie to Lodge 55 where he is the only members. El Confidente shows him paintings, that he paints from dreams and visions he has of the future. El Confidente thinks he knows where the scrolls are located, but when they two arrive, they find the safe empty and a dead body. Back to the present, Ernie tells Dud he's done chasing the scrolls. Liz is hired by Jeremy for a new upscale steakhouse called Higher Steaks. Liz, Jeremy, along with Champ and Gerson from Shamroxx, attend a orientation. During the intense orientation, Jeremy has a panic attack and Liz is made manager. Scott and Jocelyn try to boost morale at the Lodge. Liz and Dud reconnect with Lenore, an old friend of their father's, but they soon learn she just wants sell them Fydro, a specialized mineral water. The two believe it's a pyramid scheme and they leave. Later, Liz learns she was her father's lover. At Lodge 1, Connie discovers Melinda is actually Clara, and she introduces Connie to the "true lodge". At the lodge, Daphne reveals her true intentions to Dud: that she works with Avery and is also looking for the scrolls. Daphne explains that the scrolls are a formula for making money, as she believes the algorithm for Bitcoin is based on the scrolls. Dud tells everyone at the lodge about the importance of the scrolls, and El Confidente shows up at the lodge.
14	4	"Conjunctio"	Michael Trim	Alina Mankin	September 2, 2019	0.224
Liz has been bonding with Lenore, and Liz tells Dud about their father's affair with Lenore. Dud warns Liz about Lenore, and to not fall for her pyramid scheme. Liz also rejects Dud's invitation to Mexico. At Higher Steaks, Liz serves an old friend from high school, Beth, who is celebrating her bachelorette party. Dud, Blaise, and El Confidente fail to gather money for the trip to Mexico by asking other lodge members. They then ask Scott, who also declines, while Jocelyn thinks it's a good idea. Dud calls Scott an usurper, because he took the sovereign protector position from Ernie, who was appointed by Larry before he died. After continually clashing with Jocelyn, Scott orders him back to London; Jocelyn leaves and returns home. Beth tells Liz about her doubts getting married, and she asks Liz about Dud. Blaise's apothecary is robbed and he uses it as a sign from the universe to back out of the trip, because he believes using the scrolls for money is wrong. Liz hangs with Leonore again and asks her questions about her mother, and ends up buying into Fydro. In London, Connie is initiated into the True Lodge, and Clara sends her back to Long Beach; Connie, wearing a special blindfold, returns to see Ernie. Dud urges Ernie to come with him on the trip, but he declines; Ernie tells Dud he's running away from his real problems. While preparing to leave for Mexico, El Confidente knocks out Dud. El Confidente and Daphne then head out to Mexico. Dud runs into Beth at the lodge, where her wedding is taking place. Feeling it's fate and because of their past connection to each other, they spontaneously get married.
15	5	"Estrella y Mar"	Alethea Jones	Dana Ledoux Miller	September 9, 2019	0.167
Dud and Beth are now married, but they quickly wonder if it was a mistake. They move into Larry's old trailer. Connie, still blindfolded, talks with Ernie and Scott about their relationship and that her health problems have improved. Since the break-in, Blaise has secluded himself in the lodge library. Lenore takes Liz to see a psychic to gets tips on a horse race. When they leave, he tells Liz that twins are a "cosmic error" and should be born apart. Needing to make money, Dud gets a job from Temp Joy, but it turns out to be in the same office as Beth and her ex-fiancé. Dud gets marriage advice from Ernie while golfing. Ernie tells Dud that he should enjoy the most mundane tasks like grocery shopping with your true love. While grocery shopping, Dud runs into Emily, a girl he previously had a crush on; however, it gets awkward once Beth interrupts. Scott prepares a room next to Blaise's library at the lodge for Connie, which annoys Blaise because of the noise from the power tools. Blaise and Connie talk about the meaning of the true lodge, and Blaise tells her he's close to completing the Magnum Opus. Dud shows Beth the lodge, but she is completely uninterested. In the lodge library, Dud tells Blaise he can't be his apprentice anymore. While Scott continues working and making noise, Blaise has a mental breakdown and attacks Scott with a nail gun; Beth also accidentally gets hit in the hand. Dud and Beth then get divorced and she gets back together with her fiancé. At the race track, Lenore and Liz have a falling out. Back at the lodge, they discover Blaise has disappeared and Dud believes he completed the Magnum Opus and is "through to the other side".
16	6	"Circles"	Alethea Jones	Peter Ocko	September 16, 2019	0.189
Blaise is in a secret room reading the diary of the alchemist and mystic Jackie Loomis, mother of Sovereign Protector Larry Loomis and lover of Wallace Smith (the mummified Sovereign Protector found in the first season). Flashbacks detail how Jackie, a typist at Orbis, acquired the scrolls. Jackie and Wallace go to Lodge 1 in London to get the scrolls, but Wallace is too nervous so Jackie gets them by herself. She then leaves Wallace and starts a relationship with Werner Goss, a member of the Parabola Group at Orbis. She learns that they are using the power of alchemy and the scrolls to build weapons for Vietnam. Jackie then goes back to Wallace. The two make a suicide pact, as Wallace believes it will make them immortal. Wallace drinks the poison but Jackie doesn't, because she needs to care for Larry. Jackie buries Wallace in the lodge walls and leaves the diary. An older Jackie comforts a screaming Larry after he awakens from war flashbacks. In the present, Dud learns that Ernie was the one who told El Confidente not to take him to Mexico. Connie and Ernie take a break from their relationship. Dud eventually finds a secret passage in the library. Liz hangs out with her friends and co-workers Jeremy, Champ and Gerson at the abandoned Orbis complex. While high, Liz falls through the floor and wanders around. She opens a door and sees a snowy landscape and the Aurora Borealis. She returns to her friends with snow in her hair. At an open mic night at the lodge, Scott sings a song for Connie. Dud finds Blaise and he recounts what he learned from the diary. Blaise also notices Dud's leg wound has become infected and removes a shark tooth from it. The two then fall through the floor and land in the same space where the open mic is taking place in the lodge.
17	7	"Exile"	Maurice Marable	Valerie Armstrong	September 23, 2019	0.197
At Higher Steaks, none of the employees has been paid. Tarquin from Omni arrives and he offers the employees stock to be shareholders instead. Liz knows the business is failing and rejects the offer and instead gets in contact with Omni CEO Janet Price. Blaise has been banned from the Lodge by Scott, and Dud gets banned too when he and Blaise sneak back in to grab some items. Dud is angry at Scott for the turning the Lodge into something different, now filled with giant TVs, jukeboxes, and games. Ernie goes to his see ex-wife Trish where they talk about their daughter that died. Ernie is broken and Trish tells him he needs to find someone to talk to and make a life with. Connie finally breaks up with Scott, letting him know he doesn't need to worry about her anymore. Blaise tells Dud about his childhood, how his parents were always fighting and that he was kicked out and became a drifter. Liz goes to the pawnshop and takes out a loan to pay off her employees. While at the supermarket with Dud, Blaise has a laughing fit which devolves into a mental breakdown. Blaise spends the night at Ernie's to rest. Ernie blames Dud for letting Blaise get too deep into alchemy. Janet shows up at Liz's apartment and offers her to be her personal assistant in exchange for paying the Higher Steaks employees. Dud returns to Ernie's; Dud tells Ernie how he felt useless after his dad died, until he found the Lodge and his friendship with Ernie. In turn, Ernie tells Dud for the first time about his daughter. Blaise checks himself into Ludibrium, a mental health clinic, where famed author L. Marvin Metz is also staying.
18	8	"Zugzwang"	Maurice Marable	Micah Cratty	September 30, 2019	0.155
Dud is hired at West Coast Super Sales. Scott accidentally locks himself out of the Lodge and wanders around the city in his Sovereign Protector robe and gets drunk. Liz is made CFO at Omni, which confuses her and she asks Janet if the company is in trouble. Clara comes to Long Beach and visits Connie at Lodge 49 where she asks about the scrolls. Dud and Ernie visit Blaise, and they are introduced to Lemar Marvin Metz, also a Lynx, who Dud and Ernie are big fans of. Ernie and Dud spend the day with Lemar and they discuss the scrolls. Dud and Ernie begin to question Lemar's sanity when he tells them his theory that the scrolls are map to the center of the Earth, because the Earth is hollow. Dr. Kimbrough shows up at Janet's office and tries to make her confess to something illegal; Kimbrough is wearing a wire and working with the FBI who is investigating Janet. At work, Ernie has a breakthrough and tells Dud they should go to Mexico to find the scrolls and for Blaise's benefit. They are then joined by Blaise, Lemar, and his female muse. Janet admits to Liz that Omni is failing and losing money. Liz and Janet also decide to go to Mexico, but not before Janet reveals she was setting up Liz to take the fall for her. Scott returns to the Lodge and talks with Connie; Scott questions his purpose and that he's not a "king". Scott agrees to join Connie and Clara to Mexico. Everyone sets off to Mexico to find the scrolls.
19	9	"Le Reve Impossible"	Jake Schreier	Andy Siara	October 7, 2019	0.147
Everyone arrives in Mexico and they meet up at Lodge 55 where Daphne is; except Liz, Janet, and Tarquin, who are already at the hotel. Liz takes full advantage of the trip and enjoys herself immensely. Daphne tells everyone that El Confidente left and made her Sovereign Protector of Lodge 55, and that she knows where the scrolls are. Scott and Blaise reconcile; Lemar's muse Genevieve shows a romantic interest in Scott; and Clara shows the same interest in Lemar. Daphne tells everyone that the scrolls will be inside a vintage bowling bag that is up for auction. Everyone enjoys their day by swimming, drinking by the pool, and going to dinner. Dud and Liz finally meet up at the pool and Dud becomes incredibly happy and emotional once everyone is together. At the auction, Lemar bids $200 on the bowling bag, but an anonymous bid comes in for $500,000, and they lose the bid. To cause a distraction, Genevieve sings a song and then starts a fire. Ernie then steals the bag and they all run to the hotel room where they find the scrolls inside. The auctioneer and hotel security staff retrieve the bowling bag, unaware of the scrolls, and they are kicked out of the hotel. Janet is arrested by the FBI. Aboard Janet's jet, Lemar, Daphne, Dud, and Ernie are forced to parachute once the engine catches on fire. Daphne, Dud, and Ernie land on a beach where they reunite with Blaise, Scott, Connie and Clara, with the scrolls intact.
20	10	"The Door"	Jake Schreier	Jim Gavin	October 14, 2019	0.176
Dud tells Alice about Mexico, and that Lemar landed safely elsewhere and that the scrolls are in London. Liz, Jeremy, and Champ return to Temp Joy looking for new work. Connie has begun writing again after advice from Lemar. Dud wonders how he's going to pay for all his medical bills. At West Coast Super Sales, Ernie is promoted and Dud is sent on the road as a traveling salesman. Janet makes bail and returns to Liz's apartment; Janet wants Liz to be her partner, but Liz refuses. Scott steps down as sovereign protector and appoints Ernie. At the RV site, Dud plans on digging a pool. Jeremy invites Dud and Liz to Catalina Island along with his family and other friends. Blaise has been evicted from his home and Dud sets him up with a property agent to buy the old Dudley pool store. Before the ceremony, Ernie wants to make Dud a knight, but Dud says he's not ready yet. As a present, Ernie buys back Dud's car from Burt and Herman, which Dud had to previously sell. Ernie is made sovereign protector in a ceremony and thanks Dud for his contributions to the lodge. Dud and Liz go swimming at night, something that their mother loved to do. The next day, Connie reveals to Ernie that the scrolls are actually still in Long Beach because Clara believes something is wrong in London. Back in London, Clara gets a phone call, places on a blindfold, and awaits as an unknown person enters her office from a hidden elevator. It's raining in Long Beach as Liz waits outside the lodge to pick up Dud. Liz, with hesitation, enters the lodge and is greeted by the other members. Dud is running late and he tells Liz he needs to put the roof on his car. She looks towards the throne room and says "I feel like I've been here before" (what Dud also said when he first entered the lodge). It begins thundering and something sparks in Dud as he begins to dig the pool. He gets struck by lightning via his shovel and begins to sink beneath the muddy dirt, unconscious. Suddenly, Dud falls out of the lodge's mysterious second story door and onto the ground.

== Production and broadcast ==
AMC set a straight-to-series order of 10 episodes on October 5, 2016. The first season premiered on August 6, 2018. AMC released the entire first season on its AMC Premiere service on August 6, 2018, in the United States.

On October 4, 2018, the series was renewed for a second season, which premiered on August 12, 2019. The season concluded on October 14, 2019, and the series was canceled two weeks later. The producers tried to shop the series to other outlets, but were unsuccessful, as announced by series creator Jim Gavin in December.

== Reception ==
=== Critical response ===
On the review aggregation website Rotten Tomatoes, the first season holds an 89% approval rating with an average rating of 7.1 out of 10, based on 35 reviews. The website's critical consensus reads, "Lodge 49 takes a surreal journey into the television dreamscape that can prove quite rewarding for viewers who stick with it." Metacritic, which uses a weighted average, assigned a score of 70 out of 100 based on 19 critics, indicating "generally favorable reviews".

On Rotten Tomatoes, the second season holds a 100% approval rating with an average rating of 8.7 out of 10, based on 19 reviews. The website's critical consensus reads, "Lodge 49 continues its strange journey with a superb second season that leans further into the show's idiosyncrasies." On Metacritic, the season has a score of 80 out of 100 based on 5 critics, indicating "generally favorable reviews".

The second season received critical acclaim, especially the season finale. Darren Franich of Entertainment Weekly gave it an "A" grade, calling it "perfect". Franich praised Brent Jennings' performance, referring to a moment in "Conjunctio" as his favorite moment on television in 2019. Danette Chavez of The A.V. Club also graded the finale an "A" as well as the season as a whole. Chavez wrote that the finale is "such an incredibly beautiful and uplifting hour of television" and praised Wyatt Russell's performance as "one of the best, most under-the-radar performances of the year." Concluding, she wrote, "'The Door' is a great bridge to a season three, and also an immensely respectful and generous ending to the stories of these Long Beach residents."

In 2021, Jannelle Okwodu of Vogue gave the series a glowing review after discovering episodes on the streaming platform Hulu and described it as "a fantastic puzzle of a series".

=== Ratings ===
==== Season 1 ====
Viewership and ratings per episode of Lodge 49
No.	Title	Air date	Rating (18–49)	Viewers (millions)	DVR (18–49)	DVR viewers (millions)	Total (18–49)	Total viewers (millions)
1	"As Above, So Below"	August 6, 2018	0.2	0.690	0.1	0.452	0.3	1.143
2	"Moments of Truth in Service"	August 13, 2018	0.1	0.499	0.1	0.385	0.2	0.884
3	"Corpus"	August 20, 2018	0.1	0.451	0.1	0.280	0.2	0.732
4	"Sunday"	August 27, 2018	0.1	0.445	0.1	0.354	0.2	0.799
5	"Paradise"	September 3, 2018	0.1	0.409	0.1	0.359	0.2	0.769
6	"The Mysteries"	September 10, 2018	0.1	0.363	0.1	0.274	0.2	0.637
7	"The Solemn Duty of the Squire"	September 17, 2018	0.1	0.355	0.1	0.335	0.2	0.690
8	"Something From Nothing"	September 24, 2018	0.1	0.334	0.1	0.290	0.2	0.625
9	"Apogee"	October 1, 2018	0.1	0.280	—N/a	0.296	—N/a	0.577
10	"Full Fathom Five"	October 8, 2018	0.1	0.307	0.1	0.292	0.2	0.599

==== Season 2 ====
Viewership and ratings per episode of Lodge 49
No.	Title	Air date	Rating (18–49)	Viewers (millions)	DVR (18–49)	DVR viewers (millions)	Total (18–49)	Total viewers (millions)
1	"All Circles Vanish"	August 12, 2019	0.08	0.246	0.05	0.267	0.13	0.513
2	"The Slide"	August 19, 2019	0.07	0.227	0.05	0.257	0.12	0.484
3	"DisOrientation"	August 26, 2019	0.07	0.250	0.05	0.285	0.12	0.535
4	"Conjunctio"	September 2, 2019	0.05	0.224	0.04	0.188	0.09	0.412
5	"Estrella y Mar"	September 9, 2019	0.03	0.167	0.05	0.213	0.09	0.380
6	"Circles"	September 16, 2019	0.05	0.189	0.05	0.251	0.10	0.440
7	"Exile"	September 23, 2019	0.05	0.197	0.04	0.163	0.09	0.360
8	"Zugzwang"	September 30, 2019	0.03	0.155	0.06	0.184	0.08	0.339
9	"Le Reve Impossible"	October 7, 2019	0.02	0.147	—N/a	—N/a	—N/a	—N/a
10	"The Door"	October 14, 2019	0.05	0.176	—N/a	—N/a	—N/a	—N/a

=== Accolades ===
Year	Award	Category	Nominee	Result	Ref.
2019	23rd Satellite Awards	Best Television Series – Musical or Comedy	Lodge 49	Won	
