= Kyle Gallner =

American actor (born 1986)

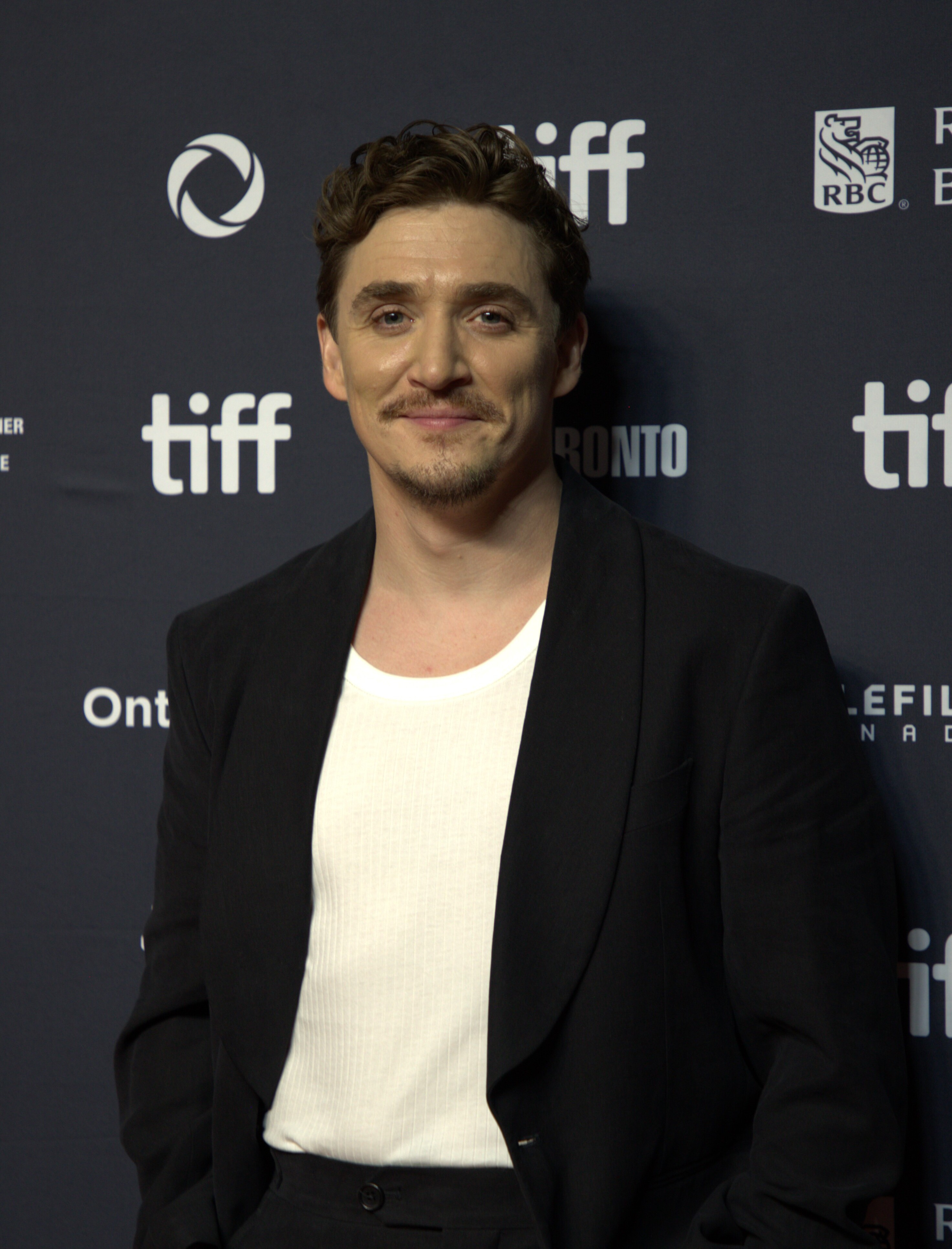
- Gallner in 2025
- Born: October 22, 1986 (age 40); West Chester, Pennsylvania, U.S.
- Occupation: Actor
- Years active: 2000–present
- Spouse: Tara Ferguson (m. 2015)
- Children: 2

Kyle Gallner (/ˈɡæl.nɜːr/ GAL-nur; born October 22, 1986) is an American actor. He began acting in 2000, earning recognition for playing Bart Allen in the superhero series Smallville (2004–2009), Cassidy "Beaver" Casablancas in the mystery drama series Veronica Mars (2005–2006), and Reed Garrett in the police drama series CSI: NY (2006–2010).

Gallner was established as a scream king in the 2010s, starring in the horror films The Haunting in Connecticut, Jennifer's Body (both 2009), the Nightmare on Elm Street remake (2010), Red State (2011), Scream, Smile (both 2022) and its sequel Smile 2 (2024). His other films include Dear White People, American Sniper (both 2014), Dinner In America (2020), The Passenger, and Strange Darling (both 2023).

== Early life and education ==
Gallner was born in West Chester, Pennsylvania, to Larry and Mary Jane Gallner. He has three siblings: one older sister, one younger brother, and a younger sister. Gallner attended West Chester East High School. He started his career by following his sister along to one of her auditions. His father's family is composed of Russian Jewish immigrants. At age four, Gallner underwent open-heart surgery.

== Career ==
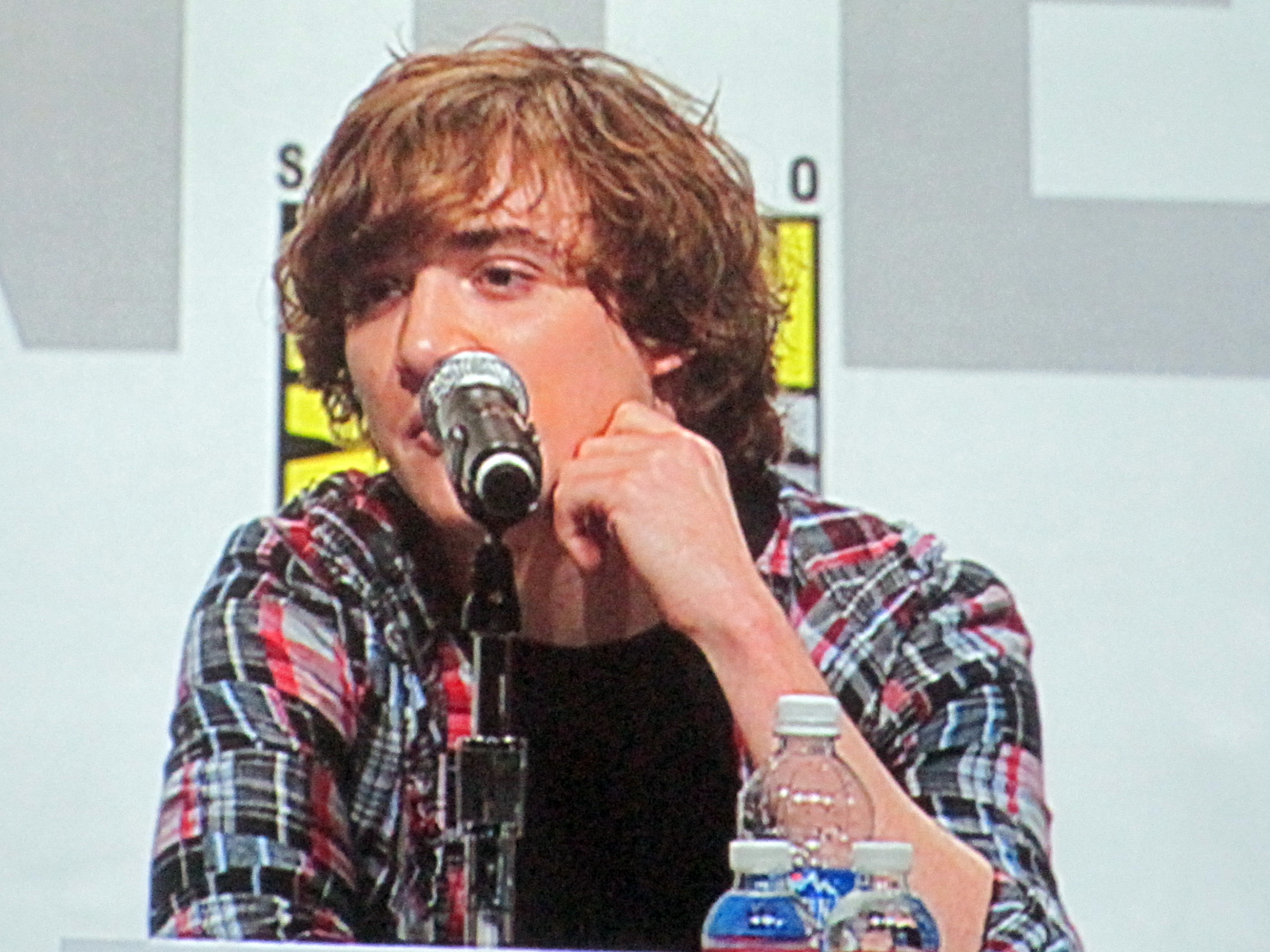
Gallner at WonderCon 2010

He proceeded to guest star on popular shows such as Judging Amy and Close to Home. Gallner joined the cast of Veronica Mars as Cassidy Casablancas toward the end of the show's first season, in May 2005, before becoming a season regular during the show's second season. After playing Bart Allen in the Smallville episode "Run", Gallner reprised the role on the January 18, 2007, episode "Justice" and the season eight finale. He also guest starred on Cold Case as a teenaged gunman in the episode "Rampage", and appeared in the independent film Sublime. He also guest starred in an episode of Bones as Jeremy Farrell, the suspected murderer of a child beauty-pageant contestant. In 2007, he guest starred in an episode of Law & Order: Special Victims Unit titled "Impulsive" as a high school student who accuses his teacher of statutory rape, as well as the only survivor of a family slaughter—which initially rendered him the prime suspect—on "Homewrecker", the season 3 premiere episode of The Closer. He also played the lead role in the horror film The Haunting in Connecticut, playing a cancer patient who is tormented by evil spirits.

He appeared in the independent film Cherry, filmed on the campuses of Kalamazoo College and Western Michigan University, along with several locations in downtown Kalamazoo, Michigan. He plays Aaron, an Ivy-League freshman who falls for an older woman while becoming the object of affection for the woman's young daughter. Gallner played Quentin in the 2010 reboot of A Nightmare on Elm Street; his character is the love interest of main character Nancy. Gallner played the brother of Aaron Paul's character in the 2012 film Smashed. Gallner played Zach in one episode in the fourth season of AMC's The Walking Dead. It was initially reported that he would be a recurring character, but his character was killed off instead. In 2013, Gallner co-founded the independent production company Minutehand Pictures along with Oliver Thompson and Bay Dariz. The trio produced the feature film Welcome to Happiness, in which Gallner portrays Woody Ward, a children's book author with a secret door in his closet. In 2014, Gallner played the role of Kurt, the antagonist to lead character Sam, in the independent film Dear White People. That same year, he acted in Clint Eastwood's war film American Sniper.

Gallner had roles in several independent films throughout the 2010s and 2020s. He starred in the critically acclaimed comedy Dinner in America, which premiered at Sundance in 2020 and earned him praise for his performance. The film struggled to find an initial audience but developed a cult following in 2024 after it gained popularity on TikTok. In 2022, he starred as Vince Schneider in the fifth Scream film, directed by Matt Bettinelli-Olpin and Tyler Gillett. He also had a significant role in horror film Smile, for which he reprised his part for a sequel in 2024. In 2023, he led the thrillers Mother, May I?, The Passenger, and Strange Darling. For his participation in the horror genre, he has been labeled a scream king. He reunited with Dinner in America director Adam Carter Rehmeier for the film Carolina Caroline.

== Personal life ==
Gallner married Tara Ferguson on December 12, 2015. They have two sons.

== Filmography ==
=== Film ===
Key
†	Denotes films that have not yet been released

Year	Title	Role	Notes
2001	Wet Hot American Summer	Bobby's buddy	
2003	Finding Home	Young Dave	
2005	Red Eye	Headphone Kid's brother	
2006	Danika	Kurt Merrick	
2007	Sublime	Ned	
2008	Gardens of the Night	Rat Boy	
2008	Red	Harold McCormack	
2009	The Haunting in Connecticut	Matt Campbell	
2009	Jennifer's Body	Colin Gray	
2010	Beautiful Boy	Sam Carroll	
2010	Cherry	Aaron Milton	
2010	A Nightmare on Elm Street	Quentin Smith	
2011	Cougars, Inc.	Sam Lowell	
2011	Little Birds	Jesse McNamara	
2011	Losers Take All	Brian	
2011	Magic Valley	TJ Waggs	
2011	Red State	Jarod	
2012	Smashed	Owen Hannah	
2013	Beautiful Creatures	Larkin Kent	
2013	CBGB	Lou Reed	
2014	American Sniper	Winston	
2014	Dear White People	Kurt Fletcher	
2014	Just Before I Go	Zeke Morgan	
2015	Band of Robbers	Huck Finn	
2015	Welcome to Happiness	Woody Ward	Also producer
2016	The Cleanse	Eric	
2016	The Finest Hours	Andrew Fitzgerald	
2018	Alien Code	Alex	
2019	The Cleansing Hour	Drew	
2020	Dinner in America	Simon / John Q	
2020	Ghosts of War	Tappert	
2022	Scream	Vince Schneider	
2022	What Comes Around	Eric / Jesse	
2022	Smile	Joel	
2023	Mother, May I?	Emmett	
2023	The Passenger	Benson	
2023	Strange Darling	The Demon	
2024	Smile 2	Joel	Cameo
2025	Carolina Caroline	Oliver	
2025	Just Breathe	Nick Bianco	
2026	Cotton Fever	James	
2027	Skeletons †	TBA	Filming
TBA	Inground †	Tom	Post-production

=== Television ===
Year	Title	Role	Notes
2000	Third Watch	Raleigh	Episode: "Young Men and Fire..."
2002, 2007	Law & Order: Special Victims Unit	Marc Lesinski	Episode: "Juvenile"
2002, 2007	Law & Order: Special Victims Unit	Shane Mills	Episode: "Impulsive"
2003	Touched by an Angel	Josh	Episode: "Virtual Reality"
2004	The District	Brian Johnson	Episode: "Something Borrowed and Something Bruised"
2004, 2007, 2009–2010	Smallville	Bart Allen / Impulse	Recurring role (seasons 4, 6, 8, & 10)
2005	Jack & Bobby	BJ Bongaro	Episodes: "Time Out of Life" & "Querida Grace"
2005	Judging Amy	Zachary Pettit	Episode: "The Long Run"
2005	Skater Boys	Sean Davis	Episode: "Sundown"
2005–2006	Veronica Mars	Cassidy "Beaver" Casablancas	Recurring role (season 1); main role (season 2)
2006	Bones	Jeremy Farrell	Episode: "The Girl with the Curl"
2006	Close to Home	Jacob Towers	Episode: "The Good Doctor"
2006	Cold Case	Cameron Coulter	Episode: "Rampage"
2006	Four Kings	Spencer	Episode: "Upper West Side Story"
2006–2007	Big Love	Jason Embry	Recurring role (seasons 1–2)
2006–2010	CSI: NY	Reed Garrett	Recurring role (seasons 3–6)
2007	The Closer	Eric Wallace	Episode: "Homewrecker"
2007	Medium	Young Stephen	Episode: "The Boy Next Door"
2008	Life	Zak Sutter	Episode: "Black Friday"
2008	The Shield	Lloyd Denton	Recurring role (season 7)
2010	Past Life	Xander	Episode: "Saint Sarah"
2012	Criminal Minds	James Heathridge	Episode: "Heathridge Manor"
2012	Jan	Robbie	Main role
2013	The Walking Dead	Zach	Episode: "30 Days Without an Accident"
2014	Play It Again, Dick	Cassidy "Beaver" Casablancas / Himself	Main role
2016–2017	Outsiders	Hasil Farrell	Main role
2020	Interrogation	Eric Fisher	Main role

== Awards and nominations ==
Year	Award	Category	Work	Result
2011	Fright Meter Awards	Best Supporting Actor	Red State	Nominated
2016	Idyllwild International Festival of Cinema	Best Actor – Feature	Welcome to Happiness	Nominated
2016	Idyllwild International Festival of Cinema	Excellence in Producing	Welcome to Happiness	Won
2016	Idyllwild International Festival of Cinema	Producer's Choice Award	Welcome to Happiness	Won
2021	Dublin International Film Festival	Jury Prize	Dinner in America	Won
2025	Saturn Awards	Best Actor	Strange Darling	Nominated
