= Blood Relatives (2022 film) =

2022 comedy horror film

- Promotional release poster
- Directed by: Noah Segan
- Written by: Noah Segan
- Starring: Noah Segan; Victoria Moroles
- Distributed by: Shudder
- Release date: September 23, 2022
- Running time: 88 minutes
- Country: United States
- Language: English

Blood Relatives is a 2022 American comedy horror film written and directed by Noah Segan, starring Noah Segan and Victoria Moroles.

== Premise ==
A Jewish vampire named Francis has spent the last century in isolation, driving around the American Midwest. One day he is tracked down by his 15-year-old daughter Jane, and the two reunite as a family.

== Cast ==
- Noah Segan as Francis
- Victoria Moroles as Jane
- Akasha Villalobos as Hilda
- C.L. Simpson as Sylvie
- Ammie Masterson as Dr. Seward
- Tracie Thoms as Ms. Shelling
- Jon Proudstar as Nathan
- Josh Ruben as Roger Fieldner
- Doug Benson as Mert the Clerk

== Release ==
Blood Relatives was screened in the United States on September 23, 2022, at Fantastic Fest. It is distributed by Shudder.

== Reception ==
On the review aggregator website Rotten Tomatoes, 96% of 28 critics' reviews are positive. The website's consensus reads: "A father-daughter road trip with a vampiric twist, Blood Relatives is one horror-comedy genre mashup that sucks in all the right ways." Metacritic, which uses a weighted average, assigned the film a score of 69 out of 100, based on 9 critics, indicating "generally favorable" reviews.

Bobby LePire, writing for Film Threat, gave the film a highly positive review, praising its "whipsmart" screenplay and calling it "a blast from start to finish". Matt Donato of IGN gave the film a mostly positive review, saying that, while "underwhelming at times", it "makes the most of its strengths." Leigh Monson of The A.V. Club comments that "Segan manages to tell a compelling story about two people finding family in a vacuum, employing comedic jolts to maintain intrigue even when the importance of the plot becomes secondary."
