= Reacher =

Reacher may refer to:

== Arts and entertainment ==
- Jack Reacher, a fictional character created by Lee Child
  - Jack Reacher, a 2012 film
  - Jack Reacher: Never Go Back, a 2016 sequel
  - Reacher (TV series), a 2022 television series based on the character

== Technology ==
- Reacher (sailing), a type of boat sail
- Reach extender, a mechanical tool
- Reacher Satellite Ground Terminal, a British military satcom device

== See also ==
- Jack Reacher (disambiguation)
- Reach (disambiguation)
