= No Middle Name =

2017 anthology book by Lee Child

- First edition
- Author: Lee Child
- Language: English
- Series: Jack Reacher
- Genre: Thriller novel
- Publisher: Delacorte Press
- Publication date: May 16, 2017
- Publication place: United Kingdom
- Media type: Print (Hardcover, Paperback), Audio, eBook
- Pages: 432 pp.
- ISBN: 978-0-399-59358-1
- Preceded by: Night School
- Followed by: The Midnight Line

No Middle Name is an anthology book from the Jack Reacher series by British writer Lee Child. This is a collection of two novellas and ten short stories released by Delacorte Press on May 16, 2017. These pieces concentrate on Jack Reacher's life, before, during, and after his military career.

== Contents ==
Novellas

1. Too Much Time
2. High Heat

Short stories

1. "Deep Down"
2. "Everyone Talks"
3. "Guy Walks into a Bar"
4. "James Penney's New Identity" (1999 version)
5. "Maybe They Have a Tradition"
6. "No Room at the Motel"
7. "Not a Drill"
8. "Second Son"
9. "Small Wars"
10. "The Picture of the Lonely Diner"

== Reception ==
A Publishers Weekly review stated, "Though Child ... is at his best in the longer entries, this volume demonstrates what his fans already know: he’s a born storyteller and an astute observer." Kirkus Reviews commented, "...the short form is refreshing after the misfire of Child's last novel, in which the violence became unpleasant and the tone curdled. No such problem here. And it’s encouraging that the novella Too Much Time, which leads into the next Reacher novel, feels like a return to form. These are tasty appetizers that will hopefully lead to a satisfying entree." Writing for the Evening Standard, Mark Sanderson stated, "...Lee Child, like his creation, always knows exactly what he’s doing — and he does it well. Time in his company is never wasted."
