= Second Son (short story) =

2011 short story by Jim Grant (Lee Child)

- Kindle cover
- Author: Lee Child
- Language: English
- Series: Jack Reacher
- Genre: Thriller, young adult fiction
- Publisher: Delacorte Press (US)
- Publication date: 15 August 2011
- Publication place: United Kingdom
- Media type: Print (Paperback), eBook
- Pages: 40 (later published together with The Affair)
- ISBN: 978-0-345-52972-5
- Preceded by: none
- Followed by: Deep Down

"Second Son" is a 2011 short story by British author Jim Grant (who writes under the pen name of Lee Child). The story, which features Jack Reacher, is a prequel to the novel series and gives a glimpse of the teen-age Reacher. "Second Son" was released originally for the Kindle and, in 2017, was included in No Middle Name, a collection of Jack Reacher short stories. "Second Son" was bundled with the movie Jack Reacher as a Target Exclusive, when the movie was released on Blu-ray on 7 May 2013.

== Plot ==
=== Paris ===
It is 1974. In Paris a 90-year-old man, the retired furniture restorer and World War I veteran Laurent Moutier, is unable to get out of bed and realizes he is about to die. He faces stoically and unflinchingly the approach of death, mainly concerned about letting his daughter Josephine know. This takes some effort since she is married to an American military officer who is a member of US Marine Corps and she is constantly moving around the world with her husband on his different assignments. Her married name is Josephine Reacher; she is Jack Reacher's mother, and the dying Moutier is therefore his grandfather.

=== Okinawa ===
The story then moves to give a snapshot of the life of the 13-year-old Reacher and his family, having newly arrived at a military base in Okinawa. His father, Captain Stan Reacher, is to take command of a unit which would take part in an invasion of China, should the US get into war with that country.

The bad news from Paris, prompting Josephine to immediately take the first plane there, is compounded by a string of various kinds of trouble hitting members of the family. Reacher and his 15-year-old brother Joe ran afoul of the neighborhood bully, an earlier-arrived American boy who takes "a toll" of anyone going to swim in the sea. Reacher is not intimidated by him – but Helen, the girl from a neighboring house to whom Reacher takes a liking, is terrified. Then, Joe is accused of stealing the text of entry examinations from the school where they are due to enroll, dimming his prospects in this school. And most seriously of all, the classified code book of the unit commanded by Stan, the father, has gone astray. Unless it can be recovered swiftly, Stan's military career would be in jeopardy.

In this multiple crisis, the young Reacher already displays both the sharp detective ability and the fighting prowess which will characterize him as a grown-up. Moreover, while just 13 years old, he displays enough self-confidence and force of personality to make a detail of grown-up military policemen follow through on the leads he offers them. Within a few hours, all problems are neatly tied up: the bully is sent to hospital with several broken ribs, his reign of terror at a definite end; Joe is completely cleared of the charge of cheating; the missing code book is duly recovered, with Stan cleared of any responsibility for its having gone astray; and Reacher is rewarded by getting to kiss Helen.
