= Jack Reacher (disambiguation) =

Jack Reacher is the fictional protagonist of crime thriller novels by British author Lee Child.

Jack Reacher may also refer to:

- Jack Reacher (book series), the series of novels featuring the character, 1997–present
- Jack Reacher (film), a 2012 American action thriller directed by Christopher McQuarrie
- Reacher (TV series), à 2022 TV series adaptation of the series of novels

== See also ==
- Jack Reacher: Never Go Back, a 2016 American sequel directed by Edward Zwick
- Reacher (TV series), a 2022 television series based on the character
