= Past Tense (novel) =

2018 novel by Lee Child

- Hardcover edition
- Author: Lee Child
- Language: English
- Series: Jack Reacher
- Release number: 23
- Genre: Thriller
- Publisher: Bantam Press (United Kingdom); Delacorte Press (United States)
- Publication date: November 5, 2018
- Publication place: United Kingdom
- Media type: Print (hardcover and paperback)
- Pages: 416
- ISBN: 978-0-593-07819-8
- OCLC: 1037885662
- Dewey Decimal: 813/.54
- LC Class: PS3553.H4838 P37 2018
- Preceded by: The Midnight Line
- Followed by: Blue Moon

Past Tense is the twenty-third book in the Jack Reacher series written by Lee Child. The book was released on United States, Canada, United Kingdom, New Zealand, Australia and Ireland by Bantam Press and Delacorte Press on November 5, 2018. It is written in the third person.

== Plot ==
While traveling from Maine to San Diego, Jack Reacher takes a detour to the town of Laconia, New Hampshire, to visit his father Stan's childhood home. He meets Elizabeth Castle, the town clerk, and attorney/historian Carter Carrington, both of whom help him deduce that no one with the name Reacher ever lived in Laconia. Expanding his search, Reacher discovers that his father grew up in Ryantown, an abandoned blue-collar community built around a prosperous tin mill. Stan ran away at the age of seventeen to enlist in the Marines.

At the same time, Shorty Fleck and Patty Sundstrom, two Canadian migrants looking to sell a trove of priceless comic books so they can use the money to settle in Florida, arrive in Laconia after their car breaks down. They take refuge at a local motel operated by four men: Mark, Peter, Steven and Robert. Through a combination of lies, gaslighting and psychological manipulation, the owners trap Shorty and Patty in their room, thwarting their attempts to escape while preparing to welcome six guests, all of whom pay a large sum of money for what turns out to be a human bowhunting contest.

Meanwhile, Reacher is barred from returning to Laconia after getting in two separate fights, making him the target of both a corrupt local farmer and an unnamed crime syndicate based out of Boston. After subduing the Boston hitmen sent to kill him at a library and subduing the farmer and his workers in a fight, Reacher and a local pastor, Rev. Patrick Burke, learn that a professor at a nearby university, also named Reacher, wants to speak to him as he is the only living male descendant of his family line. Castle and Carrington also disappear, with seemingly no explanation why.

Through his police contact, Det. Brenda Amos, Reacher is informed that Mark is a distant cousin of his, and when he and Burke go to the motel for a room, they are quickly turned away by Peter, which arouses Reacher's suspicions. He returns just as the bowhunting contest begins and manages to kill two participants while Shorty and Patty set fire to the motel and kill two of their pursuers. With his operation in tatters, Mark kills Steven, Peter and Robert, and goes to kill the other surviving contestants. Reacher disarms him and offers Patty the chance to kill him; she refuses and he performs the execution instead. They rescue a wounded Shorty, and Reacher gives them the money the owners had collected so they can achieve their dream.

Amos takes Reacher to meet an elderly Stan, who seemingly faked his death and retired to Laconia, but when they meet, Reacher learns the truth: his father, Stan's cousin William Reacher, used Stan's identity to enlist in the Marines after beating a local bully to death in 1945, and lived under that name until he died. Castle and Carrington turn up: they had fallen in love and were secretly tracing Stan's childhood off-the-grid, ending at Ryantown. Reacher tells Burke and Amos that he won't be meeting the professor after all, as he has no desire to learn anything further about his past. He then lets them return to Laconia before setting off for San Diego.

== Reception ==
Daisy Buchanan of The Independent gave the book three stars out of five, commenting:

The pace picks up, and the creepiness becomes downright disturbing, the action becomes brutal, and we're led to an extremely satisfying conclusion. There isn't much redemption in Reacher's world, only violent retribution, and I was shocked by my own blood lust. In the real world, good guys don't necessarily win. I'm becoming increasingly understanding of our appetite for fiction that features proper punishment for baddies. It's deeply comforting to escape into an imaginary world where we're all safe in Jack Reacher's gammon-joint sized hands.
