= Make Me =

Make Me may refer to:

- "Make Me..." (Britney Spears song), 2016
- "Make Me" (Janet Jackson song), 2009
- "Make Me (Cry)", by Noah Cyrus
- Make Me (novel), 2015 Jack Reacher novel by Lee Child
