= Never Go Back (novel) =

2013 novel by Lee Child

- Hardcover edition
- Author: Lee Child
- Language: English
- Series: Jack Reacher
- Release number: 18
- Genre: Thriller
- Publisher: Bantam Press (United Kingdom); Delacorte Press (United States)
- Publication date: August 29, 2013
- Publication place: United Kingdom
- Media type: Print (hardcover and paperback)
- Pages: 416
- ISBN: 978-0-593-06574-7
- OCLC: 846520327
- Dewey Decimal: 813/.54
- LC Class: PS3553.H4838 N48 2013
- Preceded by: A Wanted Man
- Followed by: Personal

Never Go Back is the eighteenth book in the Jack Reacher series written by Lee Child. It was published on United Kingdom, New Zealand, Australia and Ireland by Bantam Press on August 29, 2013 and in the United States and Canada by Delacorte Press on September 3, 2013. The book continues the storyline covered in the novels 61 Hours, Worth Dying For and A Wanted Man. The novel, like a majority of the Jack Reacher novels, is narrated in third-person point of view.

== Plot ==
At a motel outside Washington, D.C., two men confront former army investigator Jack Reacher, calling him a disgrace for bringing his unit into disrepute and order him to leave town. Reacher refuses and subdues them in a fistfight.

Earlier that day, Reacher had arrived at the headquarters of the 110th MP Special Investigations Unit to meet with its commander, Major Susan Turner. When he arrives, however, he discovers that Turner has been relieved of command. Her replacement, Colonel Morgan, says Reacher is under investigation in two cases: a suspected homicide sixteen years previous, and a lawsuit filed by Candice Dayton, a woman who alleges that she and Reacher had an affair that produced her fourteen-year-old daughter, Samantha. When Reacher points out that the military has no authority to investigate him due to his civilian status, Morgan reinstates him and gives him a room at a motel, where the fight occurs later that night. Learning that Turner has been incarcerated on suspicion of taking a bribe, Reacher goes to see her but is told he is not allowed to do so at her request.

The next morning, Reacher meets with his lawyers, Major Helen Sullivan and Captain Tracy Edmonds, and learns more about both cases. He also asks Colonel Moorcroft, Turner's attorney, to get her released from custody. Returning to headquarters, Reacher discovers that Morgan is nowhere to be found and that two men from the 110th on duty in Afghanistan have gone missing. Reacher uses his newly reinstated authority to order a search, embarrassing Morgan and getting himself banned from setting foot inside headquarters or issuing more orders. Police from the 75th MP, led by Warrant Officer Pete Espin, take Reacher into custody and bring him to the same prison where Turner is held. Moorcroft has been severely beaten, and Reacher is considered a prime suspect.

Reacher arranges a meeting with Sullivan to buy time until Turner arrives. He then stages an escape, stealing Sullivan's ID and giving it to Turner. The two attempt to flee in Turner's car but are intercepted by Metro police. They escape on foot to Berryville, Virginia, where Reacher informs Turner that her men in Afghanistan were assassinated and the charges against her were invented to cover up illegal activity. Finding themselves tracked by unusual men, they hitch a ride into West Virginia.

Reacher steals money and a car from deceased meth dealer Claughton, but his relatives identify the car, locate Reacher and Turner's motel and confront them. Reacher intimidates them into backing down and takes one of their trucks. Turner says the mission in Afghanistan was linked to a Pashtun elder, later identified as Emal Zadran, and theorizes that Morgan, the unusual men and higher-ups in the army's chain of command (using the pseudonyms Romeo and Juliet) are working together to protect Zadran. She also insists that Reacher go to Los Angeles to confront Candice. They track down Samantha, but Espin confirms that the paternity claim is bogus as he found that someone named Romeo had secured a falsified birth certificate from a corrupt lawyer and had Candice sign it for $100. Sullivan also discovers that the homicide charge was faked as well, clearing Reacher of any potential legal consequences.

Through Edmonds, Reacher and Turner learn that an illicit operation was being run through Fort Bragg under the control of Crew Scully and Gabriel Montague, both Deputy Chiefs of Staff, involving the smuggling of contraband using empty ordnance crates. Reacher arranges for Morgan and Staff Sergeant Ezra Shrago, one of the smugglers, to be arrested, and locates Scully and Montague in Georgetown, where both men choose to commit suicide rather than be arrested. Morgan and Shrago reveal that Zadran had been supplying their bosses with opium, and Turner's name is cleared, allowing her to resume command. Reacher drops his phone in the trash and sits on a bench waiting for the next bus.

== Critical reception ==
Janet Maslin, writing in The New York Times, stated that the book "may be the best desert island reading in the series. It's exceptionally well plotted. And full of wild surprises. And wise about Reacher's peculiar nature. And positively Bunyanesque in its admiring contributions to Reacher lore."

== Film adaptation ==
The novel was adapted into the 2016 film Jack Reacher: Never Go Back, serving as a sequel to the 2012 film, Jack Reacher. Written and directed by Edward Zwick, with Tom Cruise reprising his role as the title character, the film entered production in October 2015 and concluded in January 2016. The film was released on 21 October 2016.
