= The Midnight Line =

2017 novel by Lee Child

- Hardcover edition
- Author: Lee Child
- Language: English
- Series: Jack Reacher
- Release number: 22
- Genre: Thriller
- Publisher: Bantam Press (United Kingdom); Delacorte Press (United States)
- Publication date: November 7, 2017
- Publication place: United Kingdom
- Media type: Print (hardcover and paperback)
- Pages: 400
- ISBN: 978-0-593-07818-1
- OCLC: 1009363614
- Dewey Decimal: 813/.54
- LC Class: PS3553.H4838 M53 2017
- Preceded by: Night School
- Followed by: Past Tense

The Midnight Line is the twenty-second book in the Jack Reacher series written by Lee Child. The book was released on United States and Canada by Delacorte Press on November 7, 2017 and in the United Kingdom, New Zealand, Australia and Ireland by Bantam Press on November 15, 2017. It is written in the third person.

The plot finds Reacher once again in the Midwest, this time being thrust into an investigation involving the illegal opioid trade, the pharmaceutical companies that often turn a blind eye in the name of profits, and the people dependent on them.

== Plot summary ==
After spending the night with a woman named Michelle Chang, former army investigator Jack Reacher is traveling through Wisconsin when he happens to stop at a pawnshop selling an unusual item: a 2005 West Point class ring. Unwilling to accept that such a priceless thing would be willingly sold, Reacher suspects it to be stolen and decides against leaving town. He questions the pawnbroker and learns that the ring was sold to him by a biker named Jimmy Rat. Reacher beats up Jimmy's gang and learns that the ring originally belonged to a fence named Arthur Scorpio, who runs a laundromat in Rapid City, South Dakota. Reacher leaves town, aware that Jimmy has already warned Scorpio of his plans.

In Rapid City, Reacher encounters two other people with an interest in Scorpio: Gloria Nakamura, a detective who has tried and failed for years to find incriminating evidence of Scorpio's criminal enterprise; and Terrence Bramall, a private investigator hired by Tiffany Jane Mackenzie, a woman searching for her missing twin sister, Serena Rose Sanderson. Reacher learns through a sympathetic general who is in charge of West Point that Rose is the owner of the ring. Reacher allows himself to be picked up by Scorpio's men and then subdues them in less than three seconds. Scorpio provides him with the name of Seymour "Sy" Porterfield, the man who originally gave him the ring, but secretly instructs an associate of his, Billy, to kill Reacher before he finds Sy.

Reacher travels to Mule Crossing, a rural town in Wyoming, where Porterfield last resided. A local shopkeeper reveals that Sy has been dead for well over a year, supposedly killed by a wild bear. Bramall runs into Reacher at Sy's house, and the two agree to partner up, at least temporarily. They search the house and find evidence that a woman was living with Sy. Mackenzie shows up, having grown impatient with Bramall's lack of results, and Reacher reveals his growing suspicion that both Rose and Sy were involved with the illegal opioid trade, which is subsequently confirmed by Kirk Noble, a DEA agent who asks Reacher to keep him informed if he finds Rose or Billy.

While looking for a new lead on Rose's location, three junkies try to scare off the group, but Reacher intimidates them into leaving. The men turn out to be friends of Rose, and when Reacher convinces them that they mean no harm, they are taken to see Rose, who has been in hiding since an IED in Afghanistan shredded her face, leaving her disfigured and dependent on opioids. Fearing her sister will die, Mackenzie formulates a plan to move Rose to her home in Illinois, where her addiction can be treated in secret. Before they can leave, Stackley, a dealer who has taken over Billy's operation following the latter's disappearance, bribes the junkies to kill Reacher. Reacher pre-empts this by attacking them, and one of them is accidentally shot and killed. Reacher forces the others to lure Stackley into a trap where Rose kills him with a rifle.

As Rose will likely die without a new supply of opioids, Reacher, Bramall and Mackenzie steal what she needs from Stackley's suppliers, and Reacher cuts a deal with Noble to protect Rose from having to testify against the dealers on the DEA's behalf. Nakamura attempts to arrest Scorpio, who she realizes is the head of the operation, but he handcuffs her to a table. Reacher then confronts Scorpio and learns from him that Sy had been framed by a corrupt Marine named Bateman for trying to expose his theft of military opioid supplies for resale to Scorpio and had committed suicide. Bateman was convicted for other wrongdoings some time before this story. The DEA receives sufficient information to complete their investigation.

Reacher returns Rose's ring to her. Bramall and Mackenzie drive off. Reacher then hitches another ride out of South Dakota, heading towards Kansas.
