= Personal (novel) =

2014 novel by Lee Child

- Hardcover edition
- Author: Lee Child
- Language: English
- Series: Jack Reacher
- Release number: 19
- Genre: Thriller
- Publisher: Bantam Press (United Kingdom); Delacorte Press (United States)
- Publication date: August 28, 2014
- Publication place: United Kingdom
- Media type: Print (hardcover and paperback)
- Pages: 392
- ISBN: 978-0-593-07382-7
- OCLC: 883748100
- Dewey Decimal: 813/.54
- LC Class: PS3553.H4838 P38 2014
- Preceded by: Never Go Back
- Followed by: Make Me

Personal is the nineteenth book in the Jack Reacher series written by Lee Child. It was published on United Kingdom, New Zealand, Australia and Ireland by Bantam Press on August 28, 2014 and in the United States and Canada by Delacorte Press on September 2, 2014. The plot of the book revolves around Jack Reacher's pursuit of a sniper who has attempted to assassinate the President of France. This book is written in the first person.

== Plot ==
Former army investigator Jack Reacher sees an advertisement bearing his name in Army Times. Brigadier General Rick Shoemaker placed it for General Tom O'Day. Reacher flies to Fort Bragg, North Carolina, and meets Casey Nice, a State Department employee.

O'Day describes a failed sniper attempt on the French president in Paris. A .50-caliber bullet fired from 1,400 yards struck bullet-resistant glass. The world leaders are due at London's G8 meeting, and O'Day fears another target may face an attack. The suspects include Russian Fyodor Datcev, William Carson, and John Kott, a former Delta Force sniper.

Reacher arrested Kott sixteen years earlier after he killed a soldier in Colombia. Reacher suspects O'Day wants him as bait, but agrees to help. At Kott's Arkansas house, he finds a drawing of himself with a knife in his chest, his service file, and targets bearing his face.

In Paris, Reacher and Scarangello meet Russian agent Yevgeniy Khenkin and Welsh officer Bennett, both suspecting Kott. A distant rifleman kills Khenkin. Reacher pursues the shooter, but a Vietnamese man blocks him. The French police arrest Reacher and blame a youth carrying an AK-47.

Reacher tells O'Day two snipers were in Paris. One tried to break the glass for another shooter; when it held, both withdrew. Kott fired at Reacher, but wind diverted the bullet into Khenkin. A recording places Kott on a London-bound train. Reacher names Carson as his partner. Another sniper kills an Albanian gang boss; MI5 traces the beneficiaries to the Romford Boys and a Serbian gang.

Reacher and Nice travel to London. Romford gang members posing as police stop them; Reacher sees through the disguise and kills one. Bennett takes them near Little Joey Green's home, where Joey, Kott, and Carson are staying.

Reacher and Nice seize Charlie White, the 77-year-old Romford boss. Charlie says the intended victim is not a world leader, but Joey arrives with armed men. Reacher kills Joey. At Joey's house, Reacher finds Kott's rifle and damages its scope. Hearing a woman crying, he fires through a door gap and kills Kott. Nice shoots Charlie when he threatens Reacher.

At Fort Bragg, Reacher tells O'Day the G8 was never the target: Reacher was known. O'Day knew transparent panels could withstand point-blank bullets. He hired Kott to fire at Paris glass and promised Kott access to Reacher. O'Day supplied files, placed the advertisement, and tracked Reacher. Reacher threatens to expose him and leaves.

A month afterward, Reacher finds O'Day's obituary in Army Times. His death is blamed on an accidental discharge while examining a captured weapon. O'Day receives three posthumous medals, and a bridge bears his name over a North Carolina stream.

== Reception ==
Personal topped The New York Times Best Seller list of combined print and e-book fiction books for the week of 21 September 2014.

It won the 2014 RBA Prize for Crime Writing, a Spanish literary award said to be the world's most lucrative crime fiction prize at €125,000.
