= The Hard Way (novel) =

2006 novel by Lee Child

- First edition (UK)
- Author: Lee Child
- Language: English
- Series: Jack Reacher
- Release number: 10
- Genre: Thriller
- Publisher: Bantam Press (United Kingdom); Delacorte Press (United States)
- Publication date: April 3, 2006
- Publication place: United Kingdom
- Media type: Print (hardcover and paperback)
- Pages: 397
- ISBN: 0-593-05184-X
- OCLC: 61285702
- Dewey Decimal: 813/.54
- LC Class: PS3553.H4838 H37 2006
- Preceded by: One Shot
- Followed by: Bad Luck and Trouble

The Hard Way is the tenth book in the Jack Reacher series written by Lee Child. It was published in 2006 by Delacorte Press in America and Bantam in the United Kingdom. This book is written in the third person.

== Plot ==
In a Manhattan coffee shop, Jack Reacher watches a man unlock a Mercedes and drive away. Twenty-four hours later, in the same coffee shop, Reacher is approached, interrogated and then driven to The Dakota, where he meets Edward Lane and five ex-military soldiers, part of Lane's private mercenary army. Lane offers Reacher payment for his eyewitness description of the man who stole the car; hearing that Reacher is a former military police investigator, Lane offers to put him on his company's payroll at $25,000 a month to help find his wife Kate and, as an afterthought, Kate's daughter Jade. The pair, along with Lane's chauffeur and British ex-operative Graham Taylor, disappeared while on a shopping trip to Bloomingdale's.

The kidnapper initially tells Lane to put $1 million in his Mercedes and park it near the coffee shop–the man Reacher had seen drive off was the kidnapper. After the ransom retrieval, the victims are not returned. The kidnappers subsequently ask for $5 million and then an additional $4.5 million. The total comprises half the $21 million haul Lane had netted in an African operation. Despite agreeing to the new demands, Kate and Jade are still not returned.

Lane's first wife, Anne, had also been kidnapped; she'd been found dead a month later. Her sister, Patti Joseph, is convinced Lane had ordered her murder and staged it as a kidnapping because she'd asked for a divorce and a hefty settlement. Patti watches Lane's apartment month after month and passes info to an NYPD detective who passes it along to Lauren Pauling, a retired FBI agent who'd worked the first kidnapping.

As Lane's African operation had been drawing to an ignominious close, Lane engineered the death of the mercenary he'd had kill Anne by leaving him and a second mercenary to be captured and killed, contrary to the military's vow to bring every man home. The police find a body floating in the Hudson; everybody assumes it is the chauffeur Graham Taylor. The kidnappers don't call. It's assumed Kate and Jade are dead.

Pauling has a Pentagon contact who tells Reacher that Anne's murderer, Knight, and a second mercenary, Hobart had suffered terribly in prison camp. Knight died, the other Clay James Hobart made it back to the States. Pauling and Reacher find Hobart living with his widowed sister Dee Marie Graziano, whose door they break down, only to discover Hobart is near death after the prison camp torture: he's emaciated, toothless, a quadruple amputee, ill with malaria and tuberculosis. Dee Marie had visited Kate at the Lane house in the Hamptons, warning her about Lane.

Lane, through his own channels, finds out Hobart survived; his men fan out searching hospitals - it's clear that Hobart, though innocent, is a loose end and will be killed if found. Pauling and Reacher rush to warn Hobart and Dee Marie to flee, but it's too late, Lane and his men are outside. Reacher heads them off and tells Lane that for $1 million he'll deliver the kidnapper's name the following day. He tells Pauling he'll use the money to pay her and to pay for a good clinic, rehab, and living expenses for Hobart.

They figure out that Graham Taylor, Kate and Jade's chauffeur when they were kidnapped, was the kidnapper. He concealed his English accent by faking mutism and hid the victims in his own apartment. He's now flown back to England so Reacher, Lane, and all the henchmen follow.

Reacher has brought the phone number of Taylor's closest relative found as a speed dial shortcut and a local detective finds that Taylor's sister, Susan Jackson, is living on a newly-purchased, isolated farm in Norfolk. Pauling and Reacher drive out there, confirm Taylor's presence, and return to London. Reacher demands the promised million from Lane in exchange for the address, but as he's describing the location he suddenly realizes Kate left New York of her own free will and she and Jade are at the Jackson farm; Taylor had rescued, not kidnapped, them. Reacher races Lane and his men back to Norfolk and the showdown ends with Lane and his men dead, Reacher moves on. Kate and Jade now live with Taylor and his sister's family on the farm.

== Background ==
Child is a fan of Aston Villa Football Club; the naming of the fictional characters, ex-British Army Graham Taylor & John Gregory are a reference to Aston Villa managers Graham Taylor & John Gregory.

== Reception ==
A review in Library Journal said, "Reacher is humanized by both his mistakes...and his relationships with the fiftyish Pauling", while "Tension builds through plot twists to another riveting finish by Child". Publishers Weekly commended "the author's atmospheric descriptions [which] make Manhattan a leading player, with menace lurking at every intersection".
