= Nothing to Lose (novel) =

2008 novel by Lee Child

Nothing To Lose
- First edition (UK)
- Author: Lee Child
- Language: English
- Series: Jack Reacher
- Release number: 12
- Genre: Thriller
- Publisher: Bantam Press (United Kingdom); Delacorte Press (United States)
- Publication date: March 24, 2008
- Publication place: United Kingdom
- Media type: Print (hardcover and paperback)
- Pages: 400
- ISBN: 0-593-05702-3
- OCLC: 176649008
- Dewey Decimal: 813/.54
- LC Class: PS3553.H4838 N67 2008
- Preceded by: Bad Luck and Trouble
- Followed by: Gone Tomorrow

Nothing to Lose is the twelfth book in the Jack Reacher series written by Lee Child. It was published in the United Kingdom by Bantam Press on March 24, 2008 and in the United States by Delacorte Press on June 3, 2008. It is written in the third person.

== Plot ==
Jack Reacher travels across Colorado from Maine toward San Diego. He passes through two neighboring towns, twelve miles apart. Looking for a ride and coffee, he enters Despair and meets four hostile deputies. They arrest him for vagrancy and escort him beyond the county boundary. Reacher returns, determined to learn why the town rejects outsiders.

There, he meets Officer Vaughan, a policewoman who assists his inquiries. Despair's authorities answer to wealthy businessman Jerry Thurman, owner of a metal-processing facility. The armed guards protect the property, and restrictions keep outsiders away. Reacher questions why a recycling business requires such security.

He hears about missing men whose families have received no answers. Lucy Anderson is searching for a loved one. Reacher also notices an aircraft making regular nighttime trips, whose purpose residents do not know.

Vaughan describes the limits placed on her department. Despair lies beyond her jurisdiction, preventing ordinary police intervention. She helps Reacher through unofficial means. They examine Thurman's facility and find military personnel guarding its perimeter, an unusual measure for a private business.

Reacher's inquiries turn toward American military operations in Iraq and former servicemen who have gone missing. The several veterans suffered lasting injuries overseas. David Robert Vaughn, Vaughan's husband, was disabled when his military vehicle was destroyed in an explosive attack in Iraq. His condition has placed a heavy burden on Vaughan, giving her a direct reason to care about missing servicemen.

Reacher learns that Thurman's business conceals an operation involving military equipment brought from Iraq. Thurman's religious convictions shape his plans. He welcomes an approaching worldwide disaster and intends to provoke an international confrontation with an attack device assembled from military equipment. By arranging for another country to receive blame, he expects to trigger a much wider fight. His wealth, control over Despair, and armed guards conceal his preparations.

Reacher begins to stop the attack. He faces armed guards, deputies, and men defending Thurman's interests. Drawing on his former military police experience and physical strength, he defeats those opposing him. Vaughan assists in preventing the assault, bringing Reacher face to face with Thurman and his men.

Reacher defeats Thurman's operation and prevents the attack. Thurman's control over Despair ends, but the injuries suffered by former servicemen remain. Vaughan must care for her disabled husband, while Lucy and other families bear the pain of not knowing what happened to their missing loved ones.

Afterward, Reacher turns down an opportunity to remain there. He resumes his journey toward San Diego, leaving Colorado behind. His stay has ended Thurman's scheme and brought relief to people harmed by his enterprise. Reacher continues traveling alone, without permanent ties to any community.

== Similarities to First Blood ==
Nothing to Lose features several similarities to David Morrell's 1972 novel, First Blood, including the fact that the lead character (a former soldier) is mistaken for a loiterer and harassed by local law enforcement. The name of the town in both novels is "Hope" and the theme of corrupt and bullying authority is also shared.

Morrell's novel was popular in its time and was the inspiration for the hugely successful 1982 film First Blood starring Sylvester Stallone, released to international acclaim.

== Style ==
Andy Martin of The Independent described the writing of the main character to be like "the great Philip Marlowe pulp tradition, nuanced with a dash of Rambo and Bruce Willis."

== Critical reception ==
Peter Millar of The Sunday Times found the novel to be "as gripping and readable as any in the Reacher series", though he considered the main character to be a "socially dysfunctional, second-rate Superman". Henry Sutton in The Daily Mirror wrote that the novel is another example of Child's "brilliantly paced plots".
