= Chain Reaction (Child novel) =

2026 novel by Lee and Andrew Child

- Hardcover edition
- Author: Lee Child and Andrew Child
- Language: English
- Series: Jack Reacher
- Release number: 31
- Genre: Thriller
- Publisher: Bantam Press (United Kingdom); Delacorte Press (United States)
- Publication date: October 20, 2026
- Media type: Print (hardcover and paperback)
- Pages: 384
- ISBN: 978-1-91175-424-4
- OCLC: 1570746762
- Dewey Decimal: 813/.54
- Preceded by: Exit Strategy

Chain Reaction is the thirty-first novel in the Jack Reacher series written by Lee Child and Andrew Child. It is the seventh Jack Reacher novel co-authored by Lee Child, whose real name is James Dover Grant, and his younger brother Andrew Grant, published under their respective pen names of Lee Child and Andrew Child.

The book was released on United States, Canada, United Kingdom, New Zealand, Australia and Ireland by Bantam Press and Delacorte Press on October 20, 2026. It is written in the third person.

== Plot ==
Jack Reacher, a former U.S. Army major who travels without a home, phone or digital trail, is located through ATM records. In Arlington, Virginia, military police warrant officers bring him before General Susan Turner, his successor as commander of the 110th Military Police special investigations unit. Turner wants answers about an agent's murder and seeks his help.

CID Special Agent John James Bisley, a 32-year-old cybercrime expert, was stabbed behind a biker bar in Colorado on his first assignment. In a local police call it robbery, but Turner doubts that explanation: only members of her 1,000-person section knew Bisley's destination. She gives Reacher the case papers, $5,000 and a prepaid phone.

Reacher reviews Bisley's movements and notices that the seat in his rental car was too far back for his height. His sunglasses were left at the motel. Before his death, Bisley had examined five data centers near Summertown, Colorado. Reacher captures two brothers from Denver who killed Bisley. They identify San Francisco law firm Lazarus Lorenzo as the party that arranged the murder.

Turner joins Reacher in San Francisco: the armed men enter their motel rooms in Palo Alto, and Reacher and Turner kill the intruders. Someone traced Turner's duty phone after she switched it on. Reacher suspects an outsider breached G-99's system. Turner sends Elwood to Colorado, then activates her phone from a hotel. The armed men arrive, confirming that someone outside the unit can track her.

The group uses Turner's phone as bait. The three attackers arrive, targeting Saxby Cameron, a hacker, and Axel Brill, Cameron's partner and head of artificial intelligence company Everything Everywhere Forever (EEF). Reacher and Elwood seize Hugo Blackwell, who confirms EEF breached G-99's system. Brill hires retired first sergeant Hennessy to command six mercenaries.

Journalist Adam Tow tells them Stanford dropouts Brill and Cameron attracted investors with advanced algorithms. Julia Bisley says her husband found a Colorado data center processing 1.8 times its expected packet volume. Reacher learns EEF bought one data center but paid only for cosmetic upgrades at the other four.

Reacher, Turner and Elwood fly to Colorado and broadcast their location from an EEF data center. Hennessy arrives by helicopter with his men, holding Julia and her infant daughter Amanda hostage. Reacher refuses to shoot Julia and approaches Hennessy with a pistol, killing him before he harms them.

A snowplow clears gravel and exposes trenches, Julia confirms fiber-optic cables joined all five data centers to EEF. Cameron was a hacker, not an artificial intelligence innovator. EEF stole advances from training centers and cryptocurrency from mining operations. Reacher and Turner enter EEF's building during an investor presentation. Reacher makes Cameron transfer $10 million to Julia. Turner shoots Brill and Cameron, then honors Bisley. At Moffett Field, Reacher turns away alone.

== Release ==
Chain Reaction is scheduled to be released and publishing date by Bantam Press and Delacorte Press in the United States, Canada, United Kingdom, New Zealand, Australia and Ireland on October 20, 2026.

== Reception ==
Chain Reaction received positive reviews from several book critics, with praise for its fast-paced plot, contemporary themes involving artificial intelligence and cybercrime, and Jack Reacher's continued appeal. Publishers Weekly described the novel as an entertaining instalment, praising the introduction of childcare and data centres into Reacher's investigation and noting that the story offered readers considerable enjoyment.

Kirkus Reviews praised the book's fast-moving plot and contemporary subject matter, describing it as "Fast-moving fun for action junkies." However, the review criticised the relatively easy physical confrontations, arguing that Reacher's opponents lacked the strength to create sufficient tension. It also praised the incorporation of artificial intelligence, cybercrime and modern technology into the story.
