= Jack Reacher: Never Go Back =

2016 American film by Edward Zwick

- Theatrical release poster
- Directed by: Edward Zwick
- Screenplay by: Richard Wenk; Edward Zwick; Marshall Herskovitz
- Based on: Never Go Back (2013 novel) by Lee Child
- Produced by: Tom Cruise; Don Granger; Christopher McQuarrie
- Starring: Tom Cruise; Cobie Smulders; Aldis Hodge; Danika Yarosh; Jessica Stroup; Patrick Heusinger
- Cinematography: Oliver Wood
- Edited by: Billy Weber
- Music by: Henry Jackman
- Production companies: Paramount Pictures; Skydance; TC Productions
- Distributed by: Paramount Pictures
- Release dates: October 16, 2016 (New Orleans); October 21, 2016 (United States)
- Running time: 118 minutes
- Country: United States
- Language: English
- Budget: $60 million
- Box office: $162 million

Jack Reacher: Never Go Back is a 2016 American action-thriller film directed by Edward Zwick, written by Richard Wenk, Zwick, and Marshall Herskovitz, and based on the 2013 novel by Lee Child. The sequel to the 2012 film Jack Reacher, it stars Tom Cruise, reprising his role as Jack Reacher, and Cobie Smulders. The plot follows Reacher going on the run with an Army major who has been framed for espionage, as the two reveal a dark conspiracy.

Principal photography began on October 20, 2015, in New Orleans, and the film was released on October 21, 2016. It grossed $162 million worldwide and received mixed reviews from critics, who praised Cruise's performance and the film's action sequences, but criticized the plot.

== Plot ==
Four years after the events of the previous film, Jack Reacher, a drifter and former Major who commanded the US Army's 110th CID Military Police (MP), helps the current commander, Major Susan Turner, bust a corrupt Oklahoma Sheriff who is running a human trafficking ring on Army land. Returning to his old military headquarters in Washington, D.C. to finally meet Turner, Reacher learns from Colonel Sam Morgan that Turner has been accused of espionage and arrested. Believing she's being framed for the murder of two US Army MP soldiers in Afghanistan, he meets with Turner's lawyer, Army J.A.G. Colonel Moorcroft. He informs Reacher that a supposed acquaintance, prostitute and drug addict Candice Dutton, has filed a paternity suit claiming Reacher is the biological father of her 15-year-old daughter Samantha. Reacher reaches out to Samantha, who is living in foster care, but she rebuffs him.

When Moorcroft is beaten to death by The Hunter, an ex-SOCOM operator-turned mercenary, Reacher is arrested and transported to the prison where Turner is being detained. They neutralize two hitmen and escape to Morgan's residence, having deduced he is involved in the conspiracy. The Hunter kills Morgan and again frames Reacher. When surveillance pictures of Samantha suggest she is in danger, Reacher and Turner discover her foster parents dead and her in hiding. The trio seek refuge in Turner's old private school but realize Samantha's mobile phone is probably being tracked and they depart for New Orleans in search of Daniel Prudhomme, the only eyewitness to the murders for which Turner has been framed. En route, Sam reveals she filed the paternity suit, to gain financial support for her mother.

Reacher and Turner find Prudhomme in a derelict warehouse filled with drug addicts. Prudhomme is connected to Parasource, a private military company trying to cover up the murders. Reacher contacts Turner's friend, Captain Anthony Espin, to move him into custody, but they are ambushed by Parasource operatives and Prudhomme is killed, while Reacher rescues a wounded Espin. Parasource's CEO, General James Harkness, sends The Hunter to capture Samantha.

Reacher, Turner, Espin and a team of MPs, acting on information from Prudhomme, intercept a shipment of weapons and confront Harkness and his men. Espin finds opium smuggled in the shipment and learns that Harkness framed Turner for the murders of the two soldiers. Turner had been investigating Harkness' sale of weapons to insurgents and smuggling of opium into the US. The Hunter, the actual murderer, chases Sam with his team through New Orleans, hoping to lure Reacher into a confrontation. Reacher and Turner kill his henchmen and when The Hunter corners Sam on a rooftop she manages to escape. Reacher breaks The Hunter's arm, leg, and neck, in a fight before Reacher drops him off the rooftop.

Following Harkness' arrest, Turner is reinstated to her command. Reacher meets Sam at a diner and she reveals the waitress who serves them is in fact her mother. Reacher cannot be her father, as neither had recognized the other. They reluctantly part and as he walks away he receives a text message from Sam asking, "Miss me yet?". He smiles as he sticks out his thumb to hitch a ride.

== Cast ==
- Tom Cruise as Jack Reacher, a former U.S. Army Military Police Officer, formerly a Major like Turner
- Cobie Smulders as Major Susan Turner
- Aldis Hodge as Captain Espin
- Danika Yarosh as Samantha Dutton, Jack Reacher's assumed biological daughter
- Jessica Stroup as Lieutenant Sullivan
- Patrick Heusinger as The Hunter
- Holt McCallany as Colonel Sam Morgan
- Robert Knepper as General James Harkness
- Madalyn Horcher as Sergeant Leach
- Robert Catrini as Colonel Moorcroft
- Austin Hébert as Daniel Prudhomme
- Jason Douglas as Sheriff Raymond Wood
- Judd Lormand as Local deputy

In addition, Lee Child, author of the Jack Reacher novel series, makes a brief cameo appearance as a TSA agent.

== Production ==
=== Development ===
While Jack Reacher was intended to be a tent-pole for a film series, a sequel was initially reported to be unlikely due to its lackluster run at the North American box office. In February 2013, a sequel became more likely after the film surpassed a gross of $200 million worldwide. On December 9, 2013, Paramount Pictures and Skydance Media announced they were moving forward with the development of a second film, reportedly based on the 2013 Jack Reacher novel Never Go Back. On May 14, 2014, Tom Cruise was reported to be reprising his role as Jack Reacher.

On May 19, 2015, Deadline reported that Edward Zwick would take over from Christopher McQuarrie as director, reuniting with Cruise after directing him in 2003's The Last Samurai. Zwick wrote the script along with Marshall Herskovitz and Richard Wenk. Zwick . On August 14, 2015, Cobie Smulders was added to the cast to play the female lead. On September 15, Danika Yarosh signed on to star in the film, on September 17, Aldis Hodge was added to the cast, and on September 22, Patrick Heusinger was cast in the villain role. On October 20, Holt McCallany joined the film, as did Austin Hebert. On November 12, 2015, Robert Catrini joined, and on January 20, 2016, Robert Knepper was cast as General Harkness, a retired general, and CEO of a private military firm.

=== Filming ===
Principal photography on the film began on October 20, 2015, in New Orleans, Louisiana. On November 23, 2015, filming took place in Baton Rouge, and in January 2016, filming also took place in St. Francisville. Filming wrapped on January 30, 2016. The film received tax incentives for filming in Louisiana, the gross total production budget was reported to be $96 million, with $65 million of spending on location in Louisiana eligible for tax incentives, which amounted to $21 million.

== Release ==
=== Theatrical release ===
On June 14, 2016, Entertainment Weekly premiered a preview of the first trailer, with Cobie Smulders introducing the footage. The official Jack Reacher Twitter account announced that a full trailer would be released on June 22, 2016. A browser game, titled Jack Reacher: Never Stop Punching, was also released to promote the film.

In September 2015, Paramount set Jack Reacher: Never Go Back a release date of October 21, 2016.

=== Home media ===
Jack Reacher: Never Go Back was released on digital HD on January 17, 2017, and on Blu-ray, Ultra HD Blu-ray, and DVD on January 31, 2017.

By May 2018, the film had made $14.5 million in domestic region video sales.

== Reception ==
=== Box office ===
Jack Reacher: Never Go Back grossed $58.7 million in the United States and Canada, and $103.4 million in other countries, for a worldwide total of $162 million, against a production budget of $60–96 million.

In the United States and Canada, the film opened alongside Ouija: Origin of Evil, Keeping Up with the Joneses, Boo! A Madea Halloween, and I'm Not Ashamed, and was projected to gross around $20 million from 3,780 theaters in its opening weekend, with the studio expecting a debut of about $17 million. It earned $1.3 million in midnight showings at 1,850 theaters, slightly above Oblivion's $1.1 million and under Edge of Tomorrow's $1.8 million. For the weekend, the film opened to $23 million, finishing in second place, behind Boo! A Madea Halloween. In its second weekend, the film dropped by 58.2%, grossing $9.6 million, and finishing third at the box office, behind A Madea Halloween ($16.7 million) and newcomer Inferno ($15 million).

Outside North America, the film was released in 42 countries in conjunction with its United States and Canada debut, representing about 75% of the film's total marketplace internationally. In 30 of those markets, the film posted a bigger opening than the first Reacher film, and posted the top movie openings of the week in the United Kingdom and Ireland ($3.3 million), France ($2.8 million), Australia ($2 million), Russia ($2 million), Indonesia ($1.9 million), Taiwan ($1.6 million), and the United Arab Emirates ($1.3 million).

=== Critical response ===
On the review aggregator website Rotten Tomatoes, the film has an approval rating of 37%, based on 244 reviews, with an average rating of 5.2/10. The website's critical consensus reads, "Monotonously formulaic, Jack Reacher: Never Go Back is one action-thriller sequel whose title also serves as a warning." On Metacritic, the film has a weighted average score 47 out of 100, based on 43 critics, indicating "mixed or average" reviews. Audiences polled by CinemaScore gave the film an average grade of "B+" on an A+ to F scale, while the first film received an "A−".

Peter Travers of Rolling Stone wrote: "The star gives author Lee Childs’ action-lit ex-military hero an agility, rage, and quick wit in this satisfying sequel". Travers notes that Cruise is very different from the character in the books and that critics need to get over it, and says, "Cruise finds the core of Reacher in his eyes, with a haunted gaze that says this lone wolf is still on a mission and still a long way from home. That's the Reacher Lee Child created in his books. And Cruise does him proud."

Todd McCarthy of The Hollywood Reporter called it "a notable drop-off from the first Reacher feature" and said "by-the-numbers plotting, seen-it-all-before action moves, banal locations, and a largely anonymous cast alongside the star give this a low-rent feel." Peter Debruge of Variety wrote: "Zwick barely manages to tickle our adrenaline, waiting till the climactic showdown amid a New Orleans Halloween parade to deliver a sequence that could legitimately register as memorable."

== Future ==
=== Television series ===
Following the mixed critical reception to Never Go Back, plans for a third installment were delayed, while a reboot in the form of an exclusive streaming television series for Amazon's Prime Video was announced. The 8-episode first season of Reacher, starring Alan Ritchson in the lead role, was released on February 4, 2022, followed by a second season in 2023–2024, a third season in 2025 and a fourth season in 2026. The series adapts Child's first novel, Killing Floor, and the novels Bad Luck and Trouble, Persuader, and Gone Tomorrow. A fifth season was announced in May 2026.

=== Potential sequel film ===
In July 2020, Christopher McQuarrie stated that Cruise and he had been working on developments for additional movies featuring the titular character. Plans for the third film included darker themes, with intentions for the future movies in the series to be R-rated. The filmmaker further acknowledged the possibility for a return to the series at a later date, stating that the "franchise has moved on...we haven't."
