= Worth Dying For (novel) =

2010 novel by Lee Child

- Hardcover edition
- Author: Lee Child
- Language: English
- Series: Jack Reacher
- Release number: 15
- Genre: Thriller
- Publisher: Bantam Press (United Kingdom); Delacorte Press (United States)
- Publication date: September 30, 2010
- Publication place: United Kingdom
- Media type: Print (hardcover and paperback)
- Pages: 410
- ISBN: 978-0-593-06566-2
- OCLC: 505417122
- Dewey Decimal: 813/.54
- LC Class: PS3553.H4838 W67 2010
- Preceded by: 61 Hours
- Followed by: The Affair

Worth Dying For is the fifteenth book in the Jack Reacher series written by Lee Child. It was published in the United Kingdom by Bantam Press on September 30, 2010 and in the United States by Delacorte Press on October 19, 2010. It is written in the third person.

== Plot ==
Jack Reacher is on his way to Virginia to meet Major Susan Turner, the current commanding officer of his old military police unit. En route, he stops for the night at the Apollo Inn, a fading motel in rural Nebraska. There, he overhears a drunken doctor refuse to take a house call for Eleanor, a woman whose abusive husband Seth Duncan is the adoptive son in a local wealthy family. The Duncans run a trucking company that extorts business from surrounding farm, employing ten ex-Nebraska Cornhuskers offensive linemen as enforcers. Despite being warned that Eleanor is off-limits, Reacher persuades the doctor to treat her nosebleed. He then tracks Seth to a steakhouse, gives his bodyguard a concussion and breaks Seth's nose. The Duncans retaliate by sending two enforcers to smash the doctor's car. After Reacher beats them up, the Duncans force the motel owner, Vincent, to throw Reacher out.

Reacher pretends to leave but slips back into his room for the night. The next day, he meets Dorothy Coe, a woman who works part-time as a maid. She takes Reacher to her house for breakfast and reveals that the Duncans drove her family into poverty years before after she accused them of kidnapping her daughter Margaret, leading her husband Arthur to commit suicide. Rossi, an Italian American mobster in Las Vegas who works with the Duncans, sends two men to help them find Reacher, but he evades them when they arrive at Dorothy's farm. Rossi's Lebanese contact Safir and his Iranian boss, Mahmeni, send four more men when it becomes clear that the Duncans cannot deal with Reacher. They both instruct their men to kill the others to eliminate their competition. Meanwhile, Reacher puts another Duncan enforcer out of commission who was trying to kill him with his truck.

Reacher receives files through the county police on Margaret's disappearance, which seemingly clear the Duncans of any involvement. On his way back, he kills one of the Iranians, leading his partner to believe that he was murdered by the Italians. Reacher talks Eleanor into luring the lone Duncan enforcer who is guarding the road from town into following her. Reacher captures the enforcer, whose name is John, by parking his car across the road, forcing John to stop. Reacher takes John captive and challenges him to a fight. When John refuses, Reacher tells him to stay out of the battle with the Duncans and takes his vehicle. While Reacher is meeting with the doctor and Dorothy to discuss what he found, Seth and five enforcers arrive, having forced Eleanor to reveal Reacher's plan. They lock the party inside, breaking Reacher's nose and throwing him in the basement. The Italians pretend to form an alliance with Safir, then kill the remaining Iranians and set fire to the bodies.

Seth leaves, and Reacher lures and subdues the enforcers guarding him. The last two enforcers standing arrive next, one of them being John. Reacher forces the enforcer who broke his nose to immobilize John with duct tape. Reacher then challenges the enforcer to a fight, which Reacher wins, breaking the enforcer's nose in the process. After getting frustrated over a fruitless search for Reacher and stopping at the motel for the night, the Italians are lured outside and killed by Reacher. With the Duncans believing him to be dead, Reacher goes to the old barn where Margaret was last seen. Upon opening the barn and finding it full of decaying remains, he summons the townspeople over and reveals the truth: the Duncans have been engaging in human trafficking, bringing women and girls from overseas for the prostitution trade in Las Vegas. However, they also kept some of their cargo for purposes of sexual abuse, and Margaret was an opportunistic target.

Horrified, the doctor, his wife and Dorothy agree to help Reacher exact revenge on the Duncans. After setting fire to their compound, Reacher kills Seth's uncles with a rifle, before running down and killing Seth himself. The doctor and his wife chase down Seth's stepfather and Dorothy kills him. Eleanor liberates a shipment of women that her family planned to send to Vegas and informs Reacher that she will take the girls to Denver so they can assimilate into the Thai community there or try to return home. Thankful that justice has been delivered, Reacher resumes his journey to Virginia to find Major Turner.

== Critical reception ==
With so many strong-arm types flooding the prairie, there are plenty of opportunities for violence, treachery and double-crossing—think of a Nebraska remake of A Fistful of Dollars with an international cast—and Child (61 Hours, 2010, etc.) doesn’t miss a single one. By the time he’s finally shaken the dust from his feet, Reacher will have plumbed the depths of a monstrous unsolved crime, cleaned up the county and killed a lot of mostly nameless guys who really deserved it.

— Kirkus Reviews
