= Night School (novel) =

2016 novel by Lee Child

- Hardcover edition
- Author: Lee Child
- Language: English
- Series: Jack Reacher
- Release number: 21
- Genre: Thriller
- Publisher: Bantam Press (United Kingdom); Delacorte Press (United States)
- Publication date: November 7, 2016
- Publication place: United Kingdom
- Media type: Print (hardcover and paperback)
- Pages: 400
- ISBN: 978-0-593-07390-2
- OCLC: 1003995777
- Dewey Decimal: 813/.54
- LC Class: PS3553.H4838 N54 2016
- Preceded by: Make Me
- Followed by: The Midnight Line

Night School is the twenty-first book in the Jack Reacher series written by Lee Child. The novel was published on United States, Canada, United Kingdom, New Zealand, Australia and Ireland by Bantam Press and Delacorte Press on November 7, 2016. It is written in the third person.

== Plot ==
In 1996, Major Jack Reacher is in Virginia to receive a medal when he receives orders from his superior officer, Colonel Leon Garber, to attend a special "inter-agency cooperation" school alongside Casey Watterman, an FBI agent, and John White, a CIA officer. Reacher soon realizes that the “school” is actually a covert operation overseen by the National Security Advisor and his deputy, Dr. Marian Sinclair. The three are informed that, through a CIA double agent, the government has learned that a Middle Eastern sleeper cell in Hamburg has cut a deal with an unidentified American for $100 million. The three men are ordered to identify the American and whatever he's selling, and are given full access to anything they need. Reacher recruits Frances Neagley, his former sergeant, into the investigation.

Reacher and Neagley travel to Hamburg, where they get in a fight in a skinhead bar. Unbeknownst to Reacher, the men inform on him to their friends in the Neo-nazi movement. Reacher and Neagley are summoned back to the U.S. to follow up on a lead: the CIA believes that the merchandise on sale is a computer virus and the seller could be using an IT conference in Hamburg to cover his travel. However, the lead turns out to be a red herring. Returning to Hamburg, Reacher and Neagley meet the local chief of detectives, Griezman, who helps them with several leads: a municipal worker who claims to have witnessed an exchange between an American and a man of Middle Eastern origin, the murder of a local prostitute and two black market dealers with ties to a forger who provided the American with false documents.

The municipal worker, Helmut Klopp, describes the American he purported to have seen to Reacher and Griezman, but also shares the information with Dremmler, a shoe importer and an influential Neo-nazi leader. In turn, Dremmler has Muller, Griezman's deputy chief, secretly shadow Reacher's investigation. The terrorists, meanwhile, arrange for the courier who had originally met with the American to be murdered in Kyiv for their own protection, and send a new messenger to complete the deal. Reacher's team learns that the American is Horace Wiley, a front-line artilleryman who has been AWOL from his post for several months. Despite Griezman's attempts to intercept her, the messenger meets with Wiley and confirms the deal before leaving Germany.

Through extensive research into Wiley's past, as well as meeting with both his "uncle" Arnold Mason and Mason's commanding officer from the Korean War, Reacher determines that the items being sold are "Davy Crocketts", miniature nuclear bombs developed during the Cold War. A stash of ten bombs had accidentally been left behind by the United States Army in a German supply depot, and Wiley had dedicated his entire service career to finding and selling them to purchase a ranch in Argentina. Wiley murders the forger in his apartment and rents a van to move the bombs, which both the team and Dremmler learn about.

After staging an explosion to distract the authorities and narrowly evading Reacher's team when they search his apartment, Wiley is stabbed to death by two of Dremmler's men, who steal the van and the codes required to detonate the bombs. The team arrives at the same time as the crew hired by the terrorists to transport the goods; Reacher kills the crew and captures the messenger. With Griezman's help, he figures out that the van is being kept at Dremmler's warehouse and takes Neagley and two military cops, Hooper and Orozco, to retrieve it. Reacher finds and kills Dremmler in his office to cover up the theft. The military covers up all the other evidence and the bombs are returned to the United States. Reacher and Neagley are both awarded a Commendation Medal for their service.

== Reception ==
Night School was generally well-received by critics. The Washington Post called it, "the best of the Reacher novels I’ve read," while the Evening Standard called it "utterly gripping."
