= 61 Hours =

2010 novel by Lee Child

- First edition (UK)
- Author: Lee Child
- Language: English
- Series: Jack Reacher
- Release number: 14
- Genre: Thriller
- Publisher: Bantam Press (United Kingdom); Delacorte Press (United States)
- Publication date: March 18, 2010
- Publication place: United Kingdom
- Media type: Print (hardcover and paperback)
- Pages: 495
- ISBN: 978-0-593-05706-3
- OCLC: 436030133
- Dewey Decimal: 813/.54
- LC Class: PS3553.H4838 A614 2010
- Preceded by: Gone Tomorrow
- Followed by: Worth Dying For

61 Hours is the fourteenth book in the Jack Reacher series written by Lee Child. It was published in the United Kingdom by Bantam Press on March 18, 2010 and in the United States by Delacorte Press on May 18, 2010. It is written in the third person.

In the story, former military police officer Jack Reacher agrees to help the police in a small South Dakota town protect an elderly witness to a biker gang methamphetamine deal. As Reacher and the police investigate the gang's compound, the threats to the witness escalate to murder and the involvement of a powerful drug kingpin.

== Plot ==
Jack Reacher is hitching a ride through South Dakota when the bus he is on skids out on the interstate, disabling it. Together with the bus driver, Jay Knox, and local deputy Andrew Peterson, Reacher helps the elderly tourists on board get to safety in the nearby town of Bolton. Bolton is home to one of the largest prisons in the United States. In the event of an escape or riot in the prison, the town's police department is legally required to abandon all other duties and report there. This is problematic because Bolton is also home to a gang of methamphetamine dealers operating out of an abandoned military compound nearby. The police cannot get probable cause to search the compound without the testimony of retired librarian Janet Salter, the sole witness against the dealers. If the prison siren rings, the officers guarding Salter will have to leave, making her easy prey for the dealers.

Reacher agrees to help the police, first by determining what was stored in the facility. He calls up his old military police unit in Virginia, and is connected with its newest commanding officer, Major Susan Turner. Reacher then travels to the compound and finds no evidence of a meth lab. Turner discovers that forty tons of surplus materiel from World War II are being stored in tunnels accessed under the compound's main building but cannot figure out the exact contents. The facility, constructed in the 1950s, was intended to be a dual-purpose fallout shelter and orphanage. Reacher guesses that the complex's owner, a Latin American drug lord and pawnshop baron named Plato, is getting ready to sell it, but the sale would be compromised by Salter's testimony.

A local lawyer who relayed instructions in and out of the prison is found shot dead in his car, leading Reacher and the police to realize that Plato's hit man has arrived in town. Reacher guards Salter and teaches her how to fire a gun. Reacher, Peterson and police chief Tom Holland find the key to the tunnel head and venture underground. Inside they discover methamphetamine in boxes dating to the 1940s. Reacher deduces that it must have been surplus from doses given to World War II bomber pilots. There are also jewelry, paintings and other valuables: unredeemed pledges from Plato's pawnshop empire.

Returning home from the police station, Peterson is murdered by Plato's hit man, who Reacher now believes to be a police officer. Holland orders the entire department to return to the station but tells Reacher that he cannot bear to tell the news to Peterson's widow. While Reacher is at Peterson's house, the prison siren goes off. Reacher, lacking a vehicle, runs two miles to protect Salter. He is too late, and finds her shot dead in her library, her gun in her pocket. Contemplating suicide, Reacher calls Turner and reveals that he nearly killed a one-star general who had stolen food supplies meant for Reacher and other troops stationed in Kuwait during the Gulf War, costing Reacher his command and his career in the army. When Turner tells Reacher she is not married, he promises to head towards Virginia the next day.

Plato and a crew of henchmen fly to the compound on his private Boeing 737 to pack the plane full of loot and methamphetamine before selling the compound to a Russian mobster. While the two drive out to the base, Reacher reveals that he knows Holland is the hit man working for Plato, causing Holland to deliberately crash his police car. Reacher executes Holland after learning of his role in Salter's death. Plato arrives, and Reacher pretends that he is Holland and goes underground with the drug lord. Reacher kills Plato. Meanwhile, two of Plato's men, who are actually working for the Russian, kill the other henchmen and begin pumping jet fuel from the plane into the tunnels. Reacher runs up the stairs as the henchmen drop a flare down the shaft.

In Virginia, Turner watches news reports of an explosion outside Bolton, giving off fumes containing some kind of stimulant. A month later, she is redeployed to Afghanistan without a call from Reacher.

== Critical reception ==
What heats “61 Hours” to the boiling point is Mr. Child’s decision to defy his own conventions. In the interests of pure gamesmanship he seems hellbent on doing everything differently this time. For starters, there’s the setting: recent books have found Reacher in assorted warm-weather American towns and in Manhattan. This one makes new rules by marooning him in South Dakota after a tour bus carrying 20 elderly tourists and one giant (“like a hitchhiker, but not quite”) skids off a road.

— Janet Maslin, The New York Times
