= Bad Luck and Trouble =

2007 novel by Lee Child

- First edition (UK)
- Author: Lee Child
- Language: English
- Series: Jack Reacher
- Release number: 11
- Genre: Thriller novel
- Publisher: Bantam Press (United Kingdom); Delacorte Press (United States)
- Publication date: April 2, 2007
- Publication place: United Kingdom
- Media type: Print (hardcover and paperback)
- Pages: 416
- ISBN: 0-593-05701-5
- OCLC: 71779047
- Dewey Decimal: 813/.54
- LC Class: PS3553.H4838 B34 2007
- Preceded by: The Hard Way
- Followed by: Nothing to Lose

Bad Luck and Trouble is the eleventh book in the Jack Reacher series written by Lee Child. It was published in the United Kingdom by Bantam Press on April 2, 2007 and in the United States by Delacorte Press on May 15 2007, and written in the third person.

The title is one of several in the Reacher series borrowed from a blues song, in this case "Born Under a Bad Sign" by Albert King.

== Plot ==
A man with broken legs, Calvin Franz, is thrown out of a corporate helicopter from 3,000 feet above the California desert.

17 days later, Jack Reacher is roaming Portland, Oregon. Upon checking his bank account, Reacher finds $1,030 deposited by Frances Neagley, (Note: previously seen in Without Fail.) which Reacher recognizes as a call for urgent help needed. He meets up with Neagley in California and they discover the death of Calvin Franz, part of their old army unit. After getting no reply from anyone else, Neagley convinces Reacher to put the old unit back together.

Reacher and Neagley visit Franz's widow, and find Franz's office looted. They find flash memory sticks in his business post-office box but cannot crack the password. More information on the other team members shows that Franz was unlikely to be the one who called for help. Reacher and Neagley go to former team member Tony Swan's workplace, defense contractor New Age, looking for information, but are sent away with basically nothing by the HR manager, Margaret Berenson.

They meet David "Dave" O'Donnell at their hotel, who cracks the password to Franz's flash drives, finding a set of numbers which they conclude to be scores and the name "Azhari Mahmoud" with four aliases. The trio goes to Swan's home to investigate. Trapping a tail, they find out he is LA County Deputy Thomas Brant, but outside of his jurisdiction in Orange County, CA. The team ditches their rental car for a new one and runs into Karla Dixon. The team focuses on the three missing members; Manuel Orozco, Jorge Sanchez, and Tony Swan.

Reacher is visited by Brant and his boss, Curtis Mauney, a Los Angeles County Sheriff's Department detective. Neagley gets a response regarding New Age from Diana Bond, a staffer for someone on the House Defense Committee, that Reacher's team distrusts, but they pressure her for confidential information on New Age and its military contracts. Mauney later contacts the team with information on Sanchez's death and Vegas police evidence on Adrian Mount with the three other aliases. An assassination attempt is made on Reacher's team, but they kill the assassin and take his car, which Reacher recalls from their LA hotel.

From Las Vegas they are told to meet Mauney at the hospital, leading Reacher to conclude that Sanchez is not dead, just severely injured. O'Donnell and Dixon go to the hospital while Reacher and Neagley go to find Margaret Berenson after realizing that she has been lying to them. New Age has been producing state of the art missiles and pretending to destroy the prototypes, while selling them to foreign terrorists. Berenson, it turns out, is being blackmailed by New Age's corrupt director, Allen Lamaison, who has threatened to harm her son if she reveals what she knows. Upon discovering this, Reacher and Neagley arrange a hiding place for them. Lamaison used to be a police officer before joining New Age, and his partner was Mauney. Reacher and Neagley deduce that the two are working together. O'Donnell and Dixon are captured by Mauney's men in the hospital and taken to Lamaison. Reacher and Neagley track Mauney down, take his suitcase containing the terrorists' payment of $65 million, and Reacher kills him. At the New Age manufacturing facility, Reacher stows away on the company helicopter just before Lamaison loads O'Donnell and Dixon, tied up, planning to throw them out and kill them in the same way he did Franz, Orozco, Sanchez, and Swan. Reacher kills Lamaison's assistant and pushes Lamaison out of the helicopter to his death. After landing, Reacher asks the pilot if he flew for each of the murders. After confirmation, Reacher kills the pilot.

Reacher concludes the terrorist weapons buyer, Azhari Mahmoud, does not know how to use them. The team finds the one New Age staff engineer capable of teaching Mahmoud how to use the weapons, and who is being threatened with his daughter's torture. Reacher poses as the engineer as Mahmoud arrives. With Neagley's help, he ties him up, leaving him for the FBI. Later, Reacher's team agrees to use the money obtained from the criminals to set up trust funds for the murdered members' loved ones, with a donation to PETA for Tony Swan's only family, his dog Maisi, and split the remaining money. After going their separate ways, Reacher receives a deposit of over $100,000 in his account and analyses it. The detailed report shows multiple deposits, "$101810.18 and $10012. Military police radio code for mission accomplished, twice over: 10–18, 10–18. The 2nd deposit is Dixon's zip code: 10012, Greenwich Village, where she lives. Reacher remembers her inviting him to visit her in New York and considers it, but remembers that he "Doesn't make plans", withdraws $100, and buys a ticket on the first bus available, with no idea where it is going.

== Production ==
Child began forming the plot on 21 June 2005, when he remembered that it was ten years to the day he had been fired from a previous job, leading to the why and how he became a writer. He then thought about old colleagues, workmates, buddies, that he went through a lot with, and wondered where they all were, what were they doing, were they doing well or struggling, were they happy, what did they look like, and leading to full nostalgia: feelings that high school, college, old jobs, old towns moved away from, that everyone shares. He decided to make the next Reacher book about a reunion, "among a bunch of old colleagues that he hadn't seen for ten years, people that he loved fiercely and respected deeply. Regular Reacher readers will know that he's a pretty self-confident guy, but I wanted him to wobble just a little this time, to compare his choices with theirs, to measure himself against them." When Reacher's old friend tells him in the novel's beginning to "put the old unit back together", Child notes, "It's an irresistible invitation. Wouldn't we all like to do that, sometimes?"

The front of Bad Luck and Trouble has a dedication "For the real Frances L. Neagley", who is a real person. Frances Neagley won a Bouchercon charity auction to have a character named after the winner in Child's novel.

== Adaptation ==
The book was developed into the second season of TV series Reacher produced by Skydance Television, Paramount Television Studios, Blackjack Films, and Amazon Studios for Amazon Prime Video. It premiered on December 15, 2023.

== Reception ==
- Publishers Weekly wrote, "[P]ractically nothing is what it seems, and the meticulously detailed route to the truth proves especially engrossing thanks to the joint efforts of this band of brothers (and two sisters)... their smart-ass banter masking an unspoken affection. The villains' comeuppance, a riveting eye-for-an-eye battle scene (hint: helicopter), is one of Child's more satisfying finales."
- Janet Maslin, reviewing the book for The New York Times wrote, "Bad Luck and Trouble unfolds with the simple, immaculate logic that makes this series utterly addictive."
