= One Shot (novel) =

2005 novel by Lee Child

- Book cover
- Author: Lee Child
- Language: English
- Series: Jack Reacher
- Release number: 9
- Genre: Thriller novel
- Publisher: Bantam Press (United Kingdom); Delacorte Press (United States)
- Publication date: April 4, 2005
- Publication place: United Kingdom
- Media type: Print (hardcover and paperback)
- Pages: 363
- ISBN: 0-593-05183-1
- OCLC: 56387164
- Dewey Decimal: 813/.54
- LC Class: PS3553.H4838 O53 2005
- Preceded by: The Enemy
- Followed by: The Hard Way

One Shot is the ninth book in the Jack Reacher series written by Lee Child. The book title is based on "One shot, one kill," the military sniper's creed. It was published in 2005 by Delacorte Press in America and Bantam in the United Kingdom.

== Plot ==
In Indiana, a gunman in a parking garage fires into a rush-hour crowd in a public plaza, killing five apparently random victims with six shots. The shooter leaves a trail behind for police to track him down. Evidence of a shell casing and a quarter bearing the same fingerprints points to James Barr, a former United States Army sniper. Barr is arrested but will only say two things to his attorney: "They got the wrong guy," and "Get Jack Reacher for me." Reacher, a former military police officer and now a drifter, is 1,500 miles (2,400 km) away but gets on a bus to Indiana when he sees news of the shooting on CNN.

Instead of clearing Barr, Reacher wants to assist the prosecution in convicting him. During the Gulf War, Barr had gone on a killing spree similar to the Indiana shooting, but military politics and a technicality allowed him to walk free. Barr's sister Rosemary is convinced of his innocence, hiring lawyer Helen Rodin to defend him, while Helen's father is the district attorney prosecuting the case. When Reacher arrives in Indiana, Barr has been beaten so badly in custody that he cannot remember anything about the shooting. Reacher agrees to include local news reporter Ann Yanni in his investigation, in exchange for the use of her car and a guaranteed public exposé on Barr. Knowing the 35-yard distance between the parking garage and the plaza is point-blank range for a trained sniper like Barr, Reacher realizes the shooter missed one shot on purpose.

Reacher drives to the shooting range where Barr practiced and interviews the owner, former United States Marine Gunny Samuel Cash. The details Cash divulges makes Reacher doubt the solidity of the case against Barr. Cash is unwilling to reveal information or his records to Reacher but grudgingly agrees to talk if he hits a paper target dead center at 300 yards with one shot. After succeeding, Reacher is shown thirty-two sheets of target paper from three years' worth of Barr's practice shootings, every single sheet with dead-on maximum scores. Reacher deduces that the target sheets were faked by using a handgun at point blank range.

Helen and Rosemary sift through the clues and persuade Reacher of Barr's innocence, meaning someone set him up as the sniper. Reacher's investigation leads him to the real perpetrators, a Russian gang masquerading as legitimate businessmen. The gang's 80-year-old leader spent much of his life in a Soviet gulag and is known only as the Zek. Reacher outwits the guards in the Russian gang's fortress, dispatching five hoods before confronting the Zek and forcing him to come clean on the conspiracy: covering up the murder of the one victim he wants dead with the other four victims. The real killer is shot, and the Zek chooses to confess to the authorities who arrive on the scene. Barr goes free, and Reacher moves on.

== Awards and nominations ==
- 2006 Macavity Award nominee, Best Mystery Novel
- New York Times Bestseller

== Film adaptation ==
The novel was adapted into the 2012 film Jack Reacher. Written and directed by Christopher McQuarrie, the film stars Tom Cruise as the title character. The film entered production in October 2011 and concluded in January 2012. The setting, however, was changed from Indiana to Pittsburgh, Pennsylvania, where the film was shot in its entirety. Lee Child has a cameo role as the property desk officer in the police station after Reacher's arrest. The film was released on 21 December 2012. A premiere at Pittsburgh's Southside Works megaplex on 15 December, to have been attended by the film's stars and Child, was postponed following the Sandy Hook Elementary School shooting.

== See also ==
- List of books, articles and documentaries about snipers
