= Make Me (novel) =

2015 novel by Lee Child

- Hardcover edition
- Author: Lee Child
- Language: English
- Series: Jack Reacher
- Release number: 20
- Genre: Thriller
- Publisher: Bantam Press (United Kingdom); Delacorte Press (United States)
- Publication date: September 8, 2015
- Publication place: United Kingdom
- Media type: Print (hardcover and paperback)
- Pages: 432
- ISBN: 978-0-593-07388-9
- OCLC: 908698981
- Dewey Decimal: 813/.54
- LC Class: PS3553.H4838 M35 2015
- Preceded by: Personal
- Followed by: Night School

Make Me is the twentieth book in the Jack Reacher series written by Lee Child. The novel was published on United States and Canada by Delacorte Press on September 8, 2015 and in the United Kingdom, New Zealand, Australia and Ireland by Bantam Press on September 10, 2015. It is written in the third person.

== Plot ==
Jack Reacher arrives at a small Midwestern town named Mother's Rest, curious about the origin of its name. Reacher wanders the town asking the locals, but he does not learn anything. He meets a Chinese American woman named Michelle Chang, an ex-FBI agent turned private investigator looking for her colleague, Keever. Reacher's suspicions are aroused by the aloofness of the locals, and he decides to stay in town to help with Chang's investigation.

Chang explains she does not know the identity of Keever's client or any details of his case. Searching Keever's motel room, Reacher finds a crumpled up note with the name "Maloney" and a phone number. The number belongs to a journalist named Westwood, the science editor for the Los Angeles Times, who has been handling calls from conspiracy theorists. Reacher and Chang turn their search to Maloney, believing him to be Keever's contact and a resident of Mother's Rest. As they investigate, they are confronted by hostile locals whom Reacher quickly defeats while stealing their handguns.

Reacher and Chang visit Keever's home, finding it ransacked with all his investigative notes missing. Reacher believes Keever had stumbled onto something and been killed for it, and the two go to Los Angeles to meet with Westwood. Convincing Westwood that Keever had been onto something newsworthy, they agree to give the journalist exclusive rights to the story in exchange for his help. Westwood gives Reacher the phone numbers of unknown people who had recently called him who fit the profile of Keever's mystery client. They learn Maloney is a Chicago resident named Peter McCann.

Arriving at McCann's home, they find he has gone missing. They are attacked by a hitman named Hackett, who is incapacitated by Reacher. The two question McCann's neighbor and learn that Peter had a sister. At her home in Phoenix, they are attacked by more hired assassins. With the help of Chang's FBI contacts, they learn the men are all employed by a Ukrainian crime lord named Merchenko. Reacher deduces that Merchenko is working for an unknown person who lives in Mother's Rest. By an amazing coincidence, Reacher and Chang happen across Merchenko sitting outside his nightclub. Reacher executes the criminal in broad daylight.

Traveling back to Los Angeles, Reacher and Chang reunite with Westwood. Reacher posits that Peter was investigating the disappearance of his son, Michael, who had suffered from anhedonia and was a recluse who spent most of his time on the Internet. As the call from "Maloney" had been about the Deep Web, Reacher, Chang and Westwood meet with an associate of Westwood's, a computer hacker in Palo Alto. Westwood's contact is able to discover that Mother's Rest has a Deep Web site providing assisted euthanasia services. They further find that Michael had been speaking with potential suicides over the Deep Web and arranged to meet one of them at Mother's Rest to undergo euthanasia together.

Reacher, Chang and Westwood come up with a plan to assault the euthanasia site, located on a pig farm that is both highly remote and well-defended. After killing all of the armed employees, Reacher and his team discover that the farmhouse had been converted into a film studio. The criminals had recruited suicidal people over the Deep Web with promises of painless and luxurious euthanasia services. Once the clients arrive, however, they are forced to appear in snuff films that are sold over the Deep Web. Over two hundred such victims had been murdered prior to Keever discovering the operation. Reacher and Chang avenge Keever, Peter and Michael by killing the last members of the conspiracy. In the aftermath, Reacher and Chang decide to spend a little downtime in Milwaukee together.

== Adaptation ==
The book will be developed into the fifth season of TV series Reacher produced by Skydance Television, Paramount Television Studios, Blackjack Films, and Amazon Studios for Amazon Prime Video.

== Review ==
Bear that in mind next time someone tells you that Mr. Child, whose cerebral tough-guy thrillers all follow the same basic rules, is just one more genre type repeating himself in a mechanical way. “Make Me” is a hot one. So was “Never Go Back” two years ago, but the tepid “Personal” (2014) came between them. Mr. Child does his best work when he ventures into gutsy new challenges, and “Personal” didn’t present any. “Make Me” presents a huge one, but it takes its sweet time in revealing what, exactly, is underfoot in the vaguely sinister hick town that tempts Reacher.

— Janet Maslin, The New York Times
