= Jack Reacher (film) =

2012 film by Christopher McQuarrie

- Theatrical release poster
- Directed by: Christopher McQuarrie
- Screenplay by: Christopher McQuarrie
- Based on: One Shot by Lee Child
- Produced by: Tom Cruise; Don Granger; Paula Wagner; Gary Levinsohn
- Starring: Tom Cruise; Rosamund Pike; Richard Jenkins; Werner Herzog; David Oyelowo; Robert Duvall
- Cinematography: Caleb Deschanel
- Edited by: Kevin Stitt
- Music by: Joe Kraemer
- Production companies: Paramount Pictures; Skydance Productions; TC Productions
- Distributed by: Paramount Pictures
- Release dates: December 10, 2012 (Odeon Leicester Square); December 21, 2012 (United States)
- Running time: 130 minutes
- Country: United States
- Language: English
- Budget: $60 million
- Box office: $218.3 million

Jack Reacher is a 2012 American action thriller film written for the screen and directed by Christopher McQuarrie, based on Lee Child's novel One Shot, the ninth in the Jack Reacher series. Tom Cruise stars as the title character; the supporting cast includes Rosamund Pike, Werner Herzog, Robert Duvall, David Oyelowo, Richard Jenkins, and Jai Courtney. The film's plot involves Jack Reacher, a former investigator for the U.S. Army, who is called upon to help investigate a mass shooting apparently perpetrated by a trained military sniper.

The film entered production in October 2011, was filmed on location in Pittsburgh, Pennsylvania, and was completed in January 2012. The musical score was composed by Joe Kraemer and performed by the Hollywood Studio Symphony.

The film's premiere screening in Pittsburgh was postponed after the Sandy Hook Elementary School shooting; the movie was released in North America one week later on December 21, 2012, where it received generally positive reviews and was successful at the box office. Cruise later starred in a sequel: Jack Reacher: Never Go Back (2016), based on the eighteenth book in the series, Never Go Back (2013).

== Plot ==
In Pittsburgh, a man drives a van into a rooftop parking garage near the Allegheny River and PNC Park, dropping a 1968 quarter into the parking meter. Using a sniper rifle, he shoots and kills five people on the river's North Shore Trail, more than a thousand yards away, then drives off.

The Pittsburgh Police, headed by Detective Calvin Emerson, find a shell casing and the quarter used to pay for parking. A fingerprint on the coin belongs to James Barr, an ex-US Army sniper. When the police raid his house, they find the van and rifle, along with Barr unconscious. During an interrogation by Emerson and District Attorney Alex Rodin, Barr is offered life in prison in exchange for a full confession or a guaranteed death sentence, as Rodin has never lost a solid case. Barr instead writes "GET JACK REACHER" on a legal pad. A federal computer search reveals that Jack Reacher is a drifter and ex-U.S. Army Military Police Corps investigator, the rank of major.

Jack shows up at the Pittsburgh Police Station, requesting to see Barr. Emerson and Rodin deny Reacher's request to view the evidence, but agree to let him see Barr, who was attacked by fellow inmates in transit and is now in a coma. In the hospital, Reacher meets Barr's idealistic defense attorney, Helen Rodin, DA Alex Rodin's embittered daughter. Ascertaining Reacher's expertise and character, she offers Reacher the job of (her) court investigator. He reveals that Barr only joined the military to satisfy a sociopathic bloodlust, and frustrated, had randomly killed 4 military contractors, during the Iraq War, but was not court-martialed as, unknown to Barr, his victims were raping Iraqi women, and the US Army wanted to avoid any public scrutiny. However, Reacher had promised to bring justice to Barr should he ever murder again.

Reacher agrees to investigate if Helen visits the victims' families. Reacher goes to the crime scene and finds inconsistencies, primarily that a sniper of Barr's caliber would have shot from a van on the nearby Fort Duquesne Bridge, with the Sun at his back.

An apparently random bar fight helps Reacher realize that someone wants him to drop his investigation. After Helen reports her findings about the victims, Reacher suggests that the owner of a local construction company, widow Oline Archer, was the only intended target, as she had refused to sell her dead husband's construction company to a Russian-mob owned corporation.

Sandy, the young woman paid $100 to instigate the bar brawl, is murdered by the killer to cover up loose ends; Emerson suspects Reacher of the murder.

Reacher deduces the location of a shooting range in neighboring Ohio, owned by former United States Marine Corps Gunnery Sergeant Martin Cash. The real killer, Charlie, works for a mobbed-up construction firm led by an ex-Soviet Gulag prisoner known as Zek Chelovek ("prisoner human being").

After Helen outlines her findings to her DA father, Zek's minions, including Detective Emerson, kidnap her and hold her hostage at a quarry. With Cash's help, Reacher kills the henchmen (including Charlie in hand-to-hand combat) and Emerson, before confronting the Zek. The Zek gleefully points out that Reacher has killed everyone who could have testified against (Zek) and vows to frame Reacher for his mob's crimes, while also stating that, even if he is convicted, an American prison will be "a retirement home" compared to his previous incarceration in the Siberian Gulag. Convinced, Reacher fatally shoots the Zek in the head.

When Barr awakens from his coma, he tells Helen that he has no memory of the crime, but believes that he must be guilty. Barr's mental explanation of how he would have committed the shootings proves Reacher's theory. A remorseful Barr is still willing to accept both responsibility and punishment, but Helen is confident he will be cleared. Meanwhile, Reacher, sitting on a bus, overhears a man verbally and physically abusing a young woman and gets up to confront him.

== Cast ==
- Tom Cruise as Jack Reacher, a former United States Army Military Police Investigator, Major and now a drifter
- Rosamund Pike as Helen Rodin, Barr’s defense attorney and DA Rodin’s daughter
- Richard Jenkins as District Attorney Alex Rodin
- Werner Herzog as "Zek Chelovek"
- David Oyelowo as Pittsburgh Police Detective Calvin Emerson
- Jai Courtney as Charlie, a hitman working for Zek
- Joseph Sikora as James Mark Barr, an ex-United States Army sniper and the prime suspect in the murders
- Robert Duvall as Martin Cash, a former United States Marine Corps Gunnery Sergeant and Ohio gun shop owner
- Michael Raymond-James as Linsky
- Josh Helman as Jeb Oliver
- Alexia Fast as Sandy
- James Martin Kelly as Rob Farrior
- Nicole Forester as Nancy Holt
- Scott Andrew Martin as Wesley

Lee Child, the novel's author, appears in a cameo role as a Pittsburgh Police desk sergeant.

== Production ==
=== Development ===
Attempts to adapt author Lee Child's Jack Reacher novel series into a film have been made ever since the character debuted in 1997's Killing Floor. After being optioned with no success to PolyGram and later New Line Cinema, Paramount Pictures and Cruise/Wagner Productions acquired the film rights in 2005. Screenwriter Josh Olson was then hired to adapt Child's then-most recent novel in the Reacher series, One Shot (2005). In July 2010, Christopher McQuarrie, who previously collaborated with Cruise on Valkyrie (2008) and as an uncredited writer on Mission: Impossible – Ghost Protocol (2011), signed on to rework Olson's script and ultimately direct the film.

=== Casting ===
In June 2011, Tom Cruise was in talks to play the role of Jack Reacher. The following month, Cruise closed a deal with the studios and signed on for the part. Some fans of the novel series became vocal over the casting of Cruise due to the actor's height (5'7") not matching the height of Reacher in the novels (6'5"). Explaining the casting decision, author Lee Child said that it would be impossible to find a suitable actor to play the giant Reacher and to recreate the feel of the book onscreen, and that Cruise had the talent to make an effective Reacher. Child also said, "Reacher's size in the books is a metaphor for an unstoppable force, which Cruise portrays in his own way." Of Cruise's relatively small stature, Child said, "With another actor you might get 100% of the height but only 90% of Reacher. With Tom, you'll get 100% of Reacher with 90% of the height."

Following the casting of Cruise, Rosamund Pike was cast as the female lead. Other actresses who were in the running for the role included Hayley Atwell and Alexa Davalos. By September 2011, the main cast was locked in with the hiring of David Oyelowo, Richard Jenkins, Jai Courtney, and Robert Duvall. Werner Herzog, primarily known for his directorial work, rounded out the cast in October 2011 when he signed on to play the film's chief villain.

In April 2017, Dwayne Johnson revealed that he was in the running to play Jack Reacher before Cruise was hired.

In a 2018 interview, two years after the 2016 release of the sequel, Child agreed that the readers were correct in their criticism, stating:

I really enjoyed working with Cruise. He's a really, really nice guy. We had a lot of fun. But ultimately the readers are right. The size of Reacher is really, really important and it's a big component of who he is...So what I've decided to do is – there won't be any more movies with Tom Cruise. Instead we're going to take it to Netflix or something like that. Long-form streaming television, with a completely new actor. We're rebooting and starting over and we're going to try and find the perfect guy.

Eventually, Alan Ritchson was cast as Jack Reacher for the 2022 TV series on Amazon Prime Video.

=== Filming ===
Production on the film began in Pittsburgh in October 2011 and was completed in January 2012. Shooting took place at various locations in and around Pittsburgh and Allegheny County, including the Strip District, the North Shore Riverfront Park, the Fort Duquesne Bridge, Robinson Township, Sewickley, and Monroeville. The climactic shootout was filmed at a quarry in Saltsburg.

Cruise performed all of his own driving stunts during the film's signature car chase sequence. "Action to me is something very fun to shoot. The challenge in most car chases is you're trying to hide the fact that it's not the actor driving," McQuarrie said. "The challenge here was the exact opposite. We were trying to find a way to show that it was always Tom driving. He's literally driving in every stunt sequence."

In February 2012, Kevin Messick, one of the film's executive producers, sued Don Granger and Gary Levinsohn, two other producers, for breach of contract over a joint venture agreement, claiming he had "helped to develop the film, renew Paramount's options for the rights to the book, and participated in the search for a screenwriter" but starting in July 2010, had been left out of meetings with the screenwriter and the studio and not given certain drafts of the screenplay while it was under development. Messick is suing for "unspecified damages, his producer's fees and the right to participate in any upcoming sequels."

=== Music ===
The film's musical score was composed by Joe Kraemer, who previously scored director McQuarrie's The Way of the Gun (2000). Kraemer was announced as the composer for the film in July 2012, having already started work on it. After spending eight weeks working with McQuarrie on materials to present to producers, Kraemer's hiring was approved and he directly began working on the film's opening eight minutes. "I have a number of tricks that I use to spark the wild creative process," said Kraemer on his scoring process after having seen the film. "Sometimes I'll use my mathematical understanding of music to devise a theme (such as the open fifths of Reacher's theme), sometimes I'll have an orchestral color in mind (i.e. the music for THE ZEC). The actual composing process probably resembles Max Steiner more than anyone else I know of. I start at the first frame of the movie and work my through to the end, chronologically, in order."

The film is noted for its balance between music and silence, with music primarily absent or reserved during a majority of the film's action sequences. Discussing his approach to this balance, Kraemer described, "Music can make such an impact when it enters a scene, and obviously the only way to do that is to have silence beforehand. I also generally like to have long tails on my cues so that they sort of fade away rather than ending abruptly. In this way, I try to weave music in and out very carefully so that the audience is as unaware as possible of the entrances and exits. I often cite Patton as a prime example of great spotting – a three and half hour biopic with, what, twenty-eight minutes of score? That's unheard of today. But it worked!"

The score was performed by the Hollywood Studio Symphony and recorded at the Sony Scoring Stage in Culver City, California. A soundtrack album for the film was released on December 18, 2012, by La-La Land Records.

== Distribution ==
=== Marketing ===
The trailer for Jack Reacher was officially released on Cruise's birthday, July 3, 2012.

=== Theatrical release ===
Jack Reacher, then titled One Shot, was originally slated to be released in February 2013. In March 2012, the release date was brought forward by Paramount Pictures to December 21, 2012, hoping to capitalize on the box office success of Cruise's Mission: Impossible – Ghost Protocol, which was released at a similar point in 2011. The film's new release date pushed the release of World War Z back six months.

The film was released in North American markets on December 21, 2012, with a premiere initially planned for Pittsburgh's SouthSide Works megaplex on December 15, 2012, which was to be attended by the film's stars, and Lee Child.

On December 15, 2012, Paramount Pictures announced it was indefinitely postponing the film's premiere screening in Pittsburgh, Pennsylvania, out of respect for the families of the victims of the Sandy Hook Elementary School shooting, which had occurred the day before. The opening scene shows a sniper shooting at people including a woman holding a small girl, and one point aiming the cross-hairs directly at her. Writer-director McQuarrie endorsed the decision, saying he and Cruise insisted upon it:

Nobody should be celebrating anything 24 hours after a tragic event like that. We thought long and hard about it. This was not a snap judgment, because we wanted to give back to the city of Pittsburgh [by having the premiere there], because they were so great to us.

The film held its United Kingdom premiere on December 10, 2012, at London's Odeon Leicester Square. It was released in the U.K. on December 26, 2012.

=== Home media ===
Jack Reacher was released onto Blu-ray and DVD formats in the United Kingdom And in North American territories on March 19, 2013, by Paramount Home Media Distribution. The Blu-ray release contains two commentary tracks and three behind-the-scenes featurettes. Jack Reacher received a 4K UHD Blu-Ray release on June 26, 2018.

== Reception ==
=== Box office ===
Jack Reacher grossed $80.1 million in North America and $138.3 million in other countries for a worldwide total of $218.3 million, against a budget of $60 million.

In North America, the film opened in 3,352 cinemas. Jack Reacher went on to gross $5.1 million on its opening day in the U.S. and Canada, and $15.6 million in its opening weekend. The film held well in its second weekend, dropping only 10.2% to a total of $14.1 million and ranking at No. 5.

Upon its opening five-day international start, making $5.5 million in the UK and $4.4 million in France, the film grossed a total of $18.1 million from 32 international markets. Throughout the following weeks, the film expanded to additional international markets and grossed an international total of $136,497,530.

=== Critical response ===
On Rotten Tomatoes the film has an approval rating of 64%, based on 181 reviews, with a rating average of 6.30/10. The website's critical consensus states, "Jack Reacher is an above-average crime thriller with a smoothly charismatic performance from Tom Cruise." On Metacritic the film has a weighted score of 50 out of 100, based on reviews from 36 critics, indicating "mixed or average" reviews. CinemaScore polls reported that the average grade filmgoers gave the film was an "A−" on an A+ to F scale.

Todd McCarthy of The Hollywood Reporter wrote: "Tom Cruise is in fine form as mysterious tough guy Jack Reacher finally reaches the big screen." Peter Travers of Rolling Stone wrote: "This is Cruise's show. And he nails it. The patented smile is gone, replaced by a glower that makes Jack Reacher a dark and dazzling ride into a new kind of hell."

Many of the negative reviews still referred to the film as entertaining, including The Guardian, which called it "outrageous but entertaining". Peter Debruge of Variety was critical of the casting of Cruise as Reacher: "Reacher is a brawny action figure whose exploits would have been a good fit for the likes of Arnold Schwarzenegger or Sylvester Stallone back in the day, but feel less fun when delegated to a leading man like Tom Cruise. The star is too charismatic to play someone so cold-blooded, and his fans likely won't appreciate the stretch." Lisa Schwarzbaum of Entertainment Weekly wrote: "That Cruise fails to make a case for Reacher's allure, though, has less to do with physical dissonance than it does with the film's inability — stupefying inability, really — to otherwise make a case for the character's originality in a movie so choked with visual clichés and dreadfully moldy dialogue."

== Sequel ==
While Jack Reacher was intended to be a tentpole for a film series, it was initially reported that a sequel would be unlikely due to its lackluster run at the North American box office. After the film surpassed a gross of $200 million worldwide the possibility of a sequel became more likely. On December 9, 2013, it was announced that Paramount Pictures and Skydance Productions were moving forward with the development of a sequel, reportedly based on the 2013 Jack Reacher novel Never Go Back.

Principal photography on the sequel, Jack Reacher: Never Go Back, began on October 20, 2015, in New Orleans. The sequel was directed by Edward Zwick, produced by Tom Cruise, Don Granger, and Christopher McQuarrie and was written by Zwick, Richard Wenk, and Marshall Herskovitz. It stars Tom Cruise, Cobie Smulders, Patrick Heusinger, Aldis Hodge, Danika Yarosh, and Holt McCallany. The plot follows Reacher going on-the-run with an army major who has been framed for espionage, and it reveals a dark conspiracy. Jack Reacher: Never Go Back was released on October 21, 2016, in IMAX and conventional formats. It grossed $161 million worldwide and received mixed reviews from critics.

== See also ==
- Reacher, 2022 streaming television series starring Alan Ritchson
