= Jack Reacher =

Fictional character by Lee Child

- Jack Reacher character
- Alan Ritchson as Jack Reacher
- First appearance: Killing Floor (1997)
- Created by: Lee Child
- Portrayed by: Tom Cruise; Alan Ritchson; Maxwell Jenkins (young)

In-universe information
- Nickname: Reacher
- Gender: Male
- Occupation: U.S. Army Military Police Corps Major; Private investigator; Drifter; Vigilante
- Family: Laurent Moutier (maternal grandfather, deceased); William "Stan" Reacher (father, deceased); Josephine Moutier-Reacher (mother, deceased); Joe Reacher (brother, deceased)
- Nationality: American

Jack Reacher is the protagonist of a series of crime thriller novels by British author Lee Child, a 2012 film adaptation, its 2016 sequel, and a television series on Amazon Prime Video. A former major in the U.S. Army's military police, Reacher is a drifter roaming the United States, investigating suspicious and dangerous situations.

As of 2025, there are 30 novels and short stories in the Reacher series. Six of the novels have been adapted for cinema and television. Two of the adaptations are films starring Tom Cruise as Reacher: Jack Reacher (2012) from the ninth novel, One Shot; and Jack Reacher: Never Go Back (2016) from the eighteenth novel, Never Go Back.

The third adaptation, Reacher, is a television series on Amazon Prime Video, starring Alan Ritchson. The first season, adapted from the first novel, Killing Floor, premiered in 2022. The second season, from Bad Luck and Trouble, premiered in 2023. The third season, based on Persuader, premiered in 2025. The fourth season, based on Gone Tomorrow, premiered in 2026.

== Character development and perception ==
Lee Child was unemployed when he wrote Killing Floor after being fired as a union shop steward for Granada Television.

Child says he came up with the character's name because an old woman remarked on his own physique while asking him to reach for a can of pears in a supermarket. Many have commented on similarities between Child and his fictional character. Child tends to agree with such observations: "I was huge as a kid and Reacher's stature is me translated as a kid." Canadian journalist Malcolm Gladwell wrote in The New Yorker of a difference between the symbolism of the Reacher character and of traditional Western characters:

The traditional Western was a fantasy about lawfulness: it was based on a longing for order among those who had been living without it for too long. The heroes conduct themselves according to strict rules of chivalry. They act—insofar as it is possible—with restraint. In the world we live in...we are overpoliced. Our contemporary fantasy is about lawlessness: about what would happen if the institutions of civility melted away and all we were left with was a hard-muscled, rangy guy who could do all the necessary calculations in his head to insure that the bad guy got what he had coming. That's why there are rarely any police in Reacher novels—or judges or courts or lawyers or any discussion or consideration of the law.

Others are critical of the various implausibilities and contradictions present in the character and his behavior. The Washington Post journalist Kevin Nance wrote:

The unlikelihoods and outright impossibilities stack up. Ever a frugal sort... Reacher travels mostly by hitchhiking... even though the practice is roughly as current as bellbottoms and even though his appearance is, as previously established, notably simian... (A)lthough he's a loner who seems never so happy—rather like Agent Cooper in "Twin Peaks"—as when sitting quietly in a diner with a cup of black coffee and a piece of pie, he has an uncanny knack for stumbling into the worst kinds of trouble, almost none of it connected to himself."

Michael Cavacini concurred, saying unlike traditional whodunits, where a detective "simply solves a problem because it's his job", Reacher has no formal reason to be involved in anything and consequently "seems to always wind up in a situation where something goes wrong and he must make right". Prominent mystery fiction editor Otto Penzler wrote that Reacher's character reflects the chivalrous knight errant of medieval lore, as opposed to an anti-hero tormented by addiction and haunted by past misbehavior.

=== Author's commentary and interpretation ===
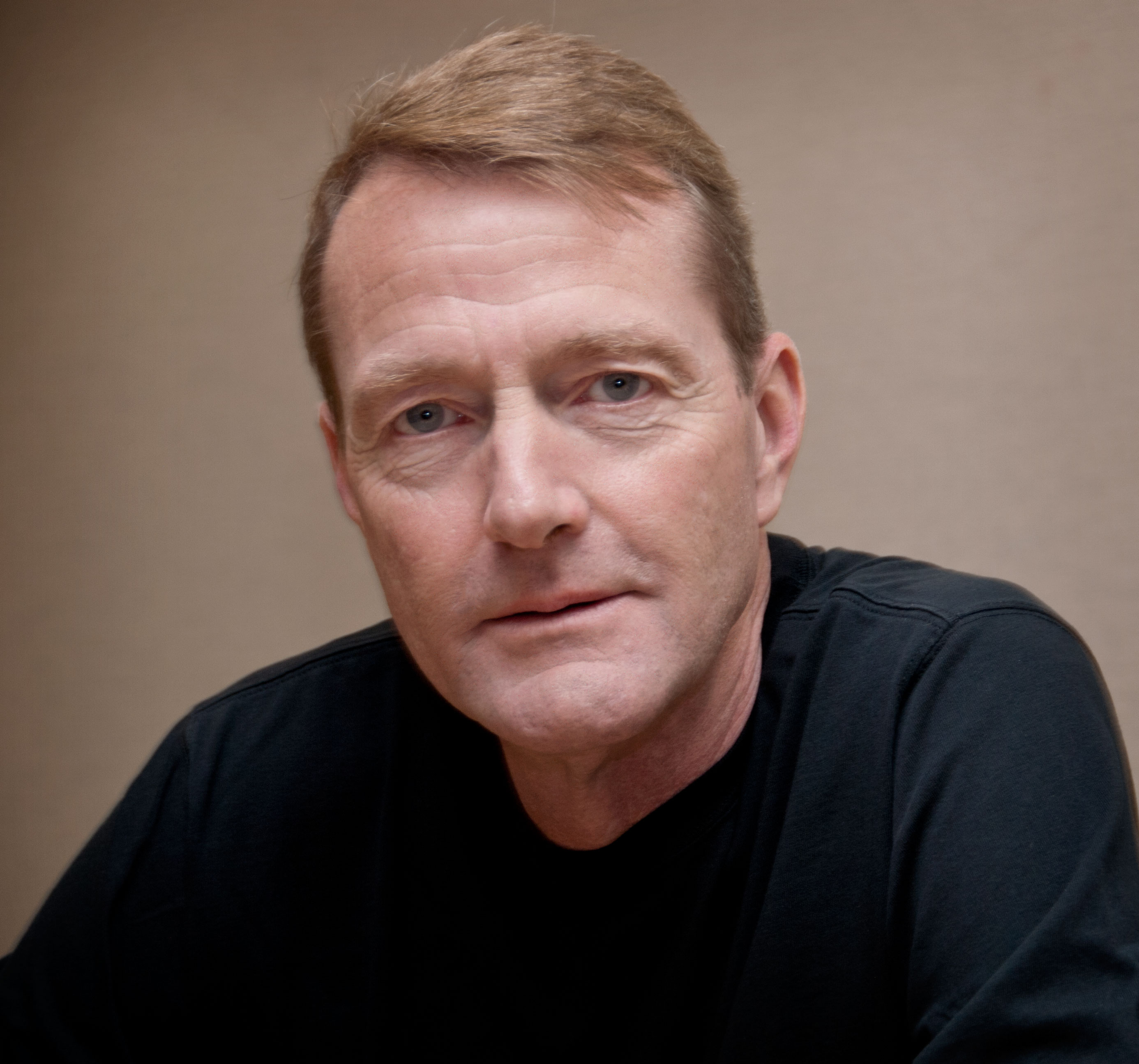
Author Lee Child at Bouchercon XLI, 2010

In physique and appearance, Child has compared Jack Reacher to rugby player Lawrence Dallaglio. Child views the character as a "happy-go-lucky guy. He has quirks and problems, but the thing is, he doesn't know he's got them. Hence, no tedious self-pity. He's smart and strong, an introvert, but any anguish he suffers is caused by others."

He was asked about the casting of Tom Cruise in the role of Jack Reacher, a decision criticized by fans who note that the novels portray Reacher as 6 ft 5 in (1.96 m) tall and weighing 250 pounds, while Cruise is 5 ft 7 in (1.70 m). The author replied that "Reacher's size in the books is a metaphor for an unstoppable force".

Child said that he drew inspiration from his own life as he developed stories for Jack Reacher's accomplices and family.

== Fictional biography ==
Jack Reacher was born on 29 October 1960 at a U.S. military base in Berlin. His mother, Josephine Moutier Reacher (née Moutier), was French, and consequently Jack speaks some French himself. His maternal grandfather was at the Battle of Verdun in the First World War, and in the French Resistance in the Second World War. Reacher's father was in the Marines.

Reacher grew up on the overseas military bases where his father was posted. He often protected his older brother, Joe, from bullies. Reacher followed Joe into the Army, and enrolled in the United States Military Academy at West Point. Commissioned as an army officer, he was assigned to the military police and, as a major, ultimately led a special unit that was tasked with difficult cases. Reacher won numerous awards during his military service and his commanding officer, Leon Garber, promoted him twice in 18 months.

After leaving the Army, he became a drifter. After the September 11 attacks, with restrictions on wire transfers heightened in response to the prevalence of Wire transfer fraud, he was obliged to carry an ATM card and photo ID in the form of a (generally expired) American passport.

== Demeanor and personality ==
Reacher, who has no background in studying genetics, claims that he is genetically predisposed to a vagrant lifestyle in Never Go Back. He says that some populations have a "natural wanderlust" such as the British Empire, the Vikings, and the Polynesians. He recognizes the economic reasons for their voyages but argues that "some of them could not stop" traveling. He believes when prehistoric humans lived in small bands a gene evolved to prevent inbreeding. As a result, "every generation and every small band had at least one person who had to wander" leading to "mixing up of gene pools" being "healthier all around."

Reacher has a love for music, especially blues. That affinity inspires Reacher to get off the bus at the start of Killing Floor. He also speaks of it to detectives investigating an early-morning suicide on a near-deserted New York subway near a blues club on Bleecker Street. He is scathing in his dismissal of traditional religious proselytizing.

In A Wanted Man Reacher says that he is a bad driver. He doesn't have a driver's license. In Without Fail, Agent Froelich searches various databases for Reacher in vain because, without a driver's license, he has no photograph or address in government records. On multiple occasions, he participates in casual sex with women he has known a short amount of time.

Child has said of Reacher's choice of an itinerant lifestyle, "It's not so much that he chooses it, it's just that it's all that he knows," as a result of the nomadic lifestyle he knew from growing up as an army brat.

The character is noted for his preference for black coffee, which Child has indicated is a reflection of his own tastes, having stated in a September 2026 Q&A video, "There is no coffee that is not plain black coffee. Anything else is a kind of sugary-flavored drink, so that coffee means nothing else in it. That's what I do, that's what Reacher does." Child also said that the copious amounts that Reacher imbibes probably reflects his own, relating that he once counted 36 mugs of coffee that he had drunk in a day, though he qualified this by calling this amount "modest" compared to the amount consumed by his brother Andrew. In the same video, when asked if Reacher has a favorite dish to order when eating at a diner, Lee replied, "Absolutely he does. A big plate of silver dollar pancakes, with lashings of maple syrup, bacon, and two fried eggs, with mugs of black coffee, of course."

== Skills ==
He knows hand-to-hand combat and tends to incorporate moves from various styles. He also has deduction skills, photographic memory and is an investigator. He is regarded to be a skilled marksman and the only non-Marine to win the U.S. Marine Corps 1000-yard Invitational rifle competition.

== Physical appearance ==
Reacher is described as being 6 feet 5 inches (1.96 m) tall, weighing 210–250 pounds (95–113 kg) and having a 50-inch (130 cm) chest. In Never Go Back, he is described as having "a six-pack like a cobbled city street, a chest like a suit of NFL armor, biceps like basketballs, and subcutaneous fat like a Kleenex tissue." In his youth, his physical appearance was likened to that of a "bulked-up greyhound". He also reveals that his size is purely genetic; he says in Persuader and Never Go Back that he is not much of an exercise enthusiast.

He has various scars, including some roughly stitched on his abdomen following a bombing in Lebanon.

== In other media ==
=== Film ===
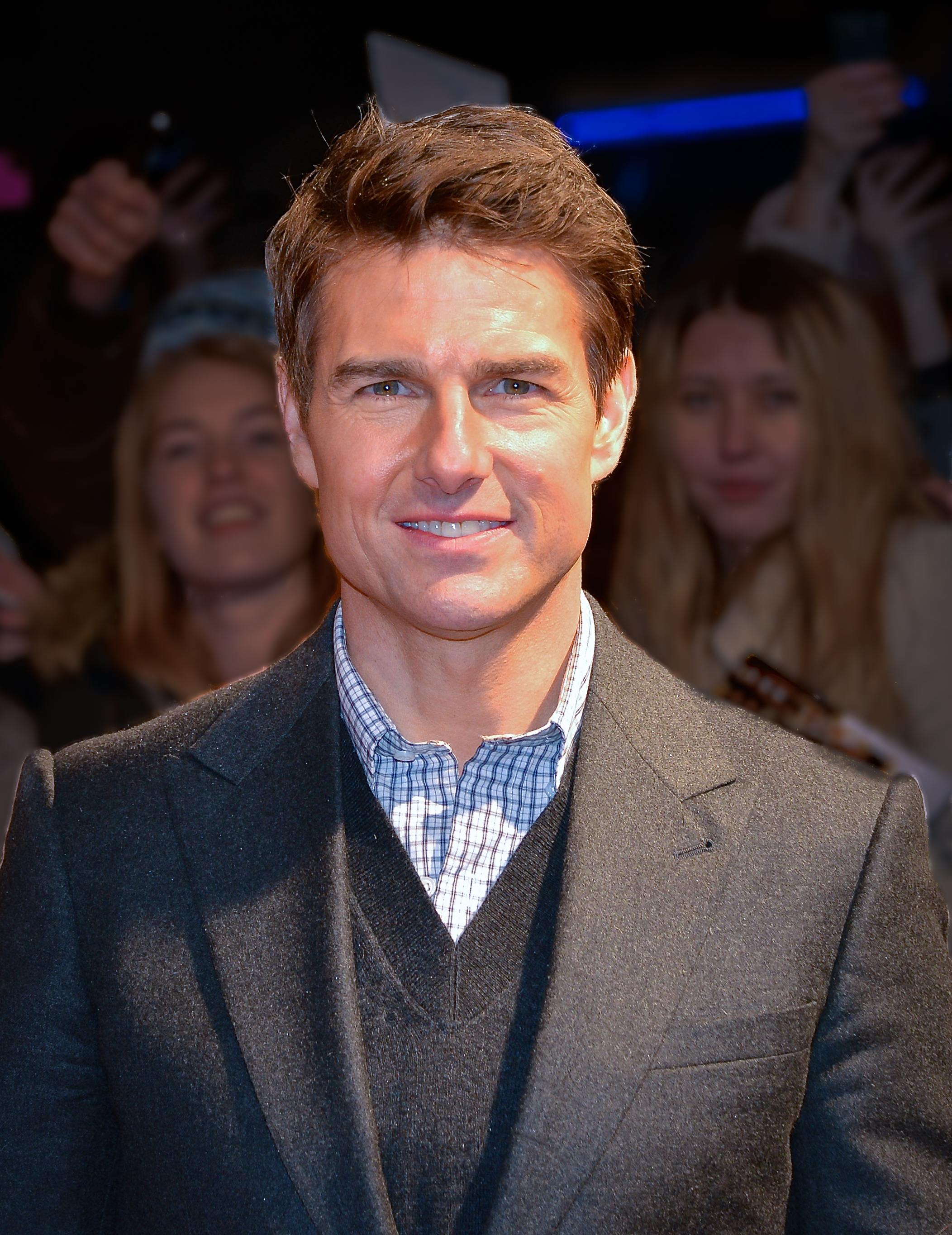
Tom Cruise in 2012

The 2012 action thriller film Jack Reacher was adapted from the ninth novel, 2005's One Shot, and stars Tom Cruise in the title role. The film was directed by Christopher McQuarrie. Cruise reprised the role in the sequel, Jack Reacher: Never Go Back, an adaptation of the 18th Jack Reacher book, Never Go Back, which was directed by Edward Zwick and released 21 October 2016.

Tom Cruise's casting was criticized by fans of the novels, primarily because of the disparity in their heights, with Reacher portrayed as a blond, 6 ft 5 in (1.96 m) tall, 250-pound man in the novels, while Cruise is 5 ft 7 in (1.70 m) tall and has brown hair. In 2012, Child commented on Cruise's casting, "Reacher's size in the books is a metaphor for an unstoppable force, which Cruise portrays in his own way."

=== Television ===
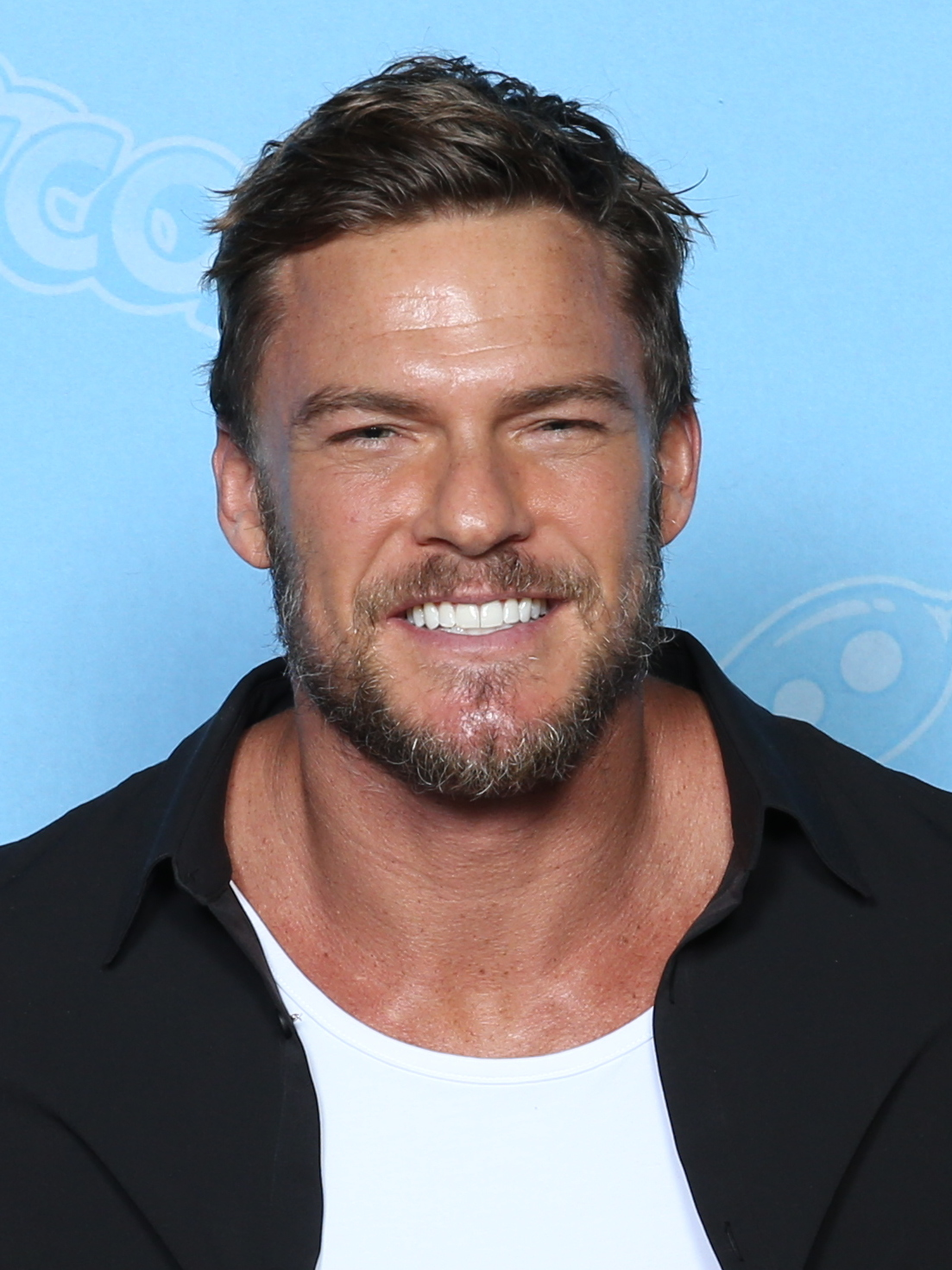
Alan Ritchson in 2022

On 14 November 2018, Child announced a deal with Skydance Television and Paramount Television to produce a Jack Reacher series based on Child's novels and that there would be no more Reacher films. He also said that Tom Cruise would no longer portray the character and that another actor would be cast in the role, citing the height difference between the fictional character and Child remarking that he was going to try and find the perfect guy.

Amazon was chosen to develop the series for Prime Video with Nick Santora as the showrunner. On 4 September 2020, Alan Ritchson was cast to play Reacher. The first season of the series, Reacher premiered on 4 February 2022 with all episodes released simultaneously. On 7 November 2023, Amazon Prime Video announced that the first three episodes of the second season would be released on 15 December with more to follow until 19 January 2024. A third season, based on the 2003 novel Persuader, premiered on 20 February 2025 and concluded on 27 March 2025. A fourth season, based on the novel, Gone Tomorrow, premiered on 12 August 2026.

== See also ==
- Jack (hero)
- Military brat
