= Nights in Rodanthe (novel) =

Novel by Nicholas Sparks

- First edition hardback cover
- Author: Nicholas Sparks
- Language: English
- Genre: Drama; Romance
- Publisher: Warner Books
- Publication date: September 2002
- Publication place: United States
- Media type: Print (hardback & paperback)
- Pages: 240
- ISBN: 0-446-53133-2
- OCLC: 49576256
- Dewey Decimal: 813/.54 21
- LC Class: PS3569.P363 N54 2002

Nights in Rodanthe is a romantic love story novel by American writer Nicholas Sparks published in September 2002.

Set in Rodanthe, North Carolina, the story follows the intense and close romance of a divorced mother, Adrienne Willis, and a divorced father and surgeon, Paul Flanner. The novel's two main protagonists meet in an inn in Rodanthe and fall strongly in love. However, fate and destiny falls upon them when they realize that leaving Rodanthe would mean going back to their separate lives.

Sparks based parts of his story on his own life's events, particularly his courting of the woman he married, Cathy Cote. Themes of genuine romantic love, and sacrifice are incorporated into the novel. Nights in Rodanthe was adapted into a 2008 film of the same name.

== Plot summary ==
The story has a framing device set in Rocky Mount, North Carolina in 2002 where part-time librarian Adrienne Willis is comforting her daughter Amanda, who is struggling to raise her children because she is still mourning her husband’s death. To show her daughter she will eventually recover, Adrienne tells Amanda about the time she met a surgeon named Paul Flanner when Amanda was thirteen.

In 1988, Adrienne managed a Rodanthe inn for a friend taking a leave of absence, for an opportunity of escapism. She had divorced her husband, who abandoned her for a younger woman, and she was taking care of her sick father while raising her three children. As soon as she arrives at the inn, a major storm is forecast. Her only customer is Paul Flanner, a 54-year-old recently divorced surgeon also wanting to escape his hectic life, who had sold his house and was being sued for malpractice. The two fall in love throughout the week but realize they will have to go back to their old lives. After conversations about their families, Paul decides to join his estranged son in an Ecuadorian medical clinic to rework their relationship, communicating with Adrienne through letters when she returns to Rocky Mount with her family. The romance continued, but Paul later died.

In the present, Amanda is annoyed her mother did not tell her and her two brothers about the situation. She reads Adrienne’s last contact from Ecuador, written by Paul’s son Dr. Mark, thanking her mother for helping his father realize how arrogant he had been.

== Writing ==
Sparks developed the rudiments of Nights in Rodanthe while he was writing his fourth novel, The Rescue. He said that he contemplated writing "another short love story ... that harkens back to poignant emotional intensity of The Notebook", his first published novel. Unlike his other works, Nights in Rodanthe was not inspired by a specific person who was involved in Sparks' life; the story drew upon an incident when his mother-in-law requested as a Christmas present that her name and that of her husband, Paul, would appear in a Sparks novel. So Sparks worked on a story that his in-laws would "not only enjoy, but not offend them as well".

Sparks encountered difficulties; it "just didn't seem to come together". For Sparks, there should be an "element that [would keep] the characters apart in order to have drama". Throughout Sparks' career, he has attempted to not use the same element twice, so it had become harder for him to write each new novel. He comments, "If I don't have the 'conflict', I don't have the story, and for the life of me, I couldn't come up with something new to keep the characters apart. ... I also wanted to write a story using older characters, again because it's something I haven't done (with the exception of The Notebook, in which they're elderly, not middle-aged)."

Sparks diverted his attention by working on A Bend in the Road, his fifth novel, and the first draft of The Guardian, which succeeded the release of Nights in Rodanthe. However, The Guardian imposed a "tremendous challenge" to Sparks, and he reckoned it would require a "great deal of re-writing". He was tired of writing the novel and needed a break from it.

So Sparks returned to Nights in Rodanthe: "My mind then returned to the story I'd been thinking about, and suddenly everything began to click. Within days, I suddenly knew exactly how to tell the story. I knew the characters, the setting, and especially and most importantly, the 'conflict' that would keep the characters apart." Sparks started writing the novel in December 2001. He finished the draft in February 2002, and editing continued until April of the same year.

== Style and themes ==
Sparks set the novel in Rodanthe, a small town in the Outer Banks off the coast of North Carolina. He chose Rodanthe because, according to him, it "looks wonderful on the page, and the name itself conjures up a mixture of mystery and sensuality", adding he had wished to write a novel about the place. In an interview, Sparks said, "In Nights in Rodanthe, I needed a sense of isolation. Find another area of coastline in the U.S. that isn't developed where that could happen." The inn, where the majority of the events in the novel happened, is fictitious. According to Sparks, there are a number of bed and breakfasts in other Outer Banks towns that are similar to his description of the inn in the novel, but he chose to create it for the story.

Sparks based parts of the story from his real life events, though less so compared to his previous novels. These events were given twists to "make the story as interesting as possible". The story parallels Sparks' relationship with his wife, Cathy Cote. In his speech in 2002 for the Friends of the Library in Fayetteville, North Carolina, Sparks cited several similarities of the story with his own life. Sparks and his wife, in their senior years, met in a small coastal town where they traveled to in hopes of respite. He recalls, "I sensed something kind and wonderful about Cathy almost immediately, though Cathy (like Adrienne) was a little bit more hesitant in her feelings for me."

The prose of the novel is written in third person. The main body of the novel consists of Adrienne's flashback about her love affair with Paul. Sparks incorporated the themes of sacrifice and existential dread into the story. Adrienne and Paul parted ways for the sake of their children. Sparks comments, "I think that sacrifice is inherent to good parenting. Both Paul and Adrienne loved their children, and the sacrifices they were willing to make made them nobler as characters."

According to some critics, Sparks was inspired by the 1992 best-selling novel The Bridges of Madison County in writing Nights in Rodanthe. The Bridges of Madison County has a few similarities to Nights in Rodanthe: the characters are roughly of the same age and their relationships had ended. Sparks, said he was more guided by his novel The Notebook than The Bridges. He explained that the latter is a story of adultery while his is not. The main male character of The Bridges was a loner without children, while Paul has children. In his official website, Sparks writes, "The list [of the disparity of the two novels] could go on and on, but I think you get the point."

== Release and reception ==
Nights in Rodanthe was published in September 2002 by Warner Books to commercial success. It was Sparks' first novel to debut at number one on the best-sellers chart. On July 1, 2003, Grand Central Publishing republished the novel in paperback. Nights in Rodanthe was republished in July 2007 by Hachette Book Group, and the novel's cover features the promotional photo for its film adaptation. An unabridged audio version of the novel was published by Hachette Book Group in August 2008. The audio is narrated by American actress JoBeth Williams, and it spans five hours and 30 minutes. Scarce copies of the first printing of the novel's hardcover edition are sold; the cover bears an autograph by Sparks.

Nights in Rodanthe received mixed reviews. Sheri Melnick of Book Reviews complimented the novel for its "emotional depth", adding, "No doubt bookstores should sell this tearjerker with a box of tissues, as even the most unemotional of readers will be hard pressed not to cry." Karen Valby of Entertainment Weekly magazine gave the book a "C" and notes, "Sparks, no slouch when it comes to a sales hook, employs many of the same elements of Robert James Waller's weepie in his Outer Banks romance." Trisha Finster of Lakeland Mirror complimented Sparks, saying "Sparks has a unique way of going about writing romance in his novels."

The novel was adapted into a film of the same name, released on September 26, 2008, in the United States. Sparks sold the film rights to Warner Bros. American film producer Denise Di Novi produced the film, directed by George C. Wolfe from a screenplay by Ann Peacock and John Romano. Nights in Rodanthe stars American actor Richard Gere as Paul and actress Diane Lane as Adrienne. The movie has received generally negative reviews.
