= The Last Song (2010 film) =

2010 American film

- Theatrical release poster
- Directed by: Julie Anne Robinson
- Screenplay by: Nicholas Sparks; Jeff Van Wie
- Based on: The Last Song by Nicholas Sparks
- Produced by: Adam Shankman; Jennifer Gibgot
- Starring: Miley Cyrus; Liam Hemsworth; Bobby Coleman; Kelly Preston; Greg Kinnear
- Cinematography: John Lindley
- Edited by: Nancy Richardson
- Music by: Aaron Zigman
- Production companies: Touchstone Pictures; Offspring Entertainment
- Distributed by: Walt Disney Studios Motion Pictures
- Release date: March 31, 2010
- Running time: 107 minutes
- Country: United States
- Language: English
- Budget: $20 million
- Box office: $89 million

The Last Song is a 2010 American coming-of-age teen romantic drama film developed alongside Nicholas Sparks' 2009 novel. The film was directed by Julie Anne Robinson in her feature film directorial debut and co-written by Sparks and Jeff Van Wie. The Last Song stars Miley Cyrus, Liam Hemsworth, and Greg Kinnear.

Troubled NYC teen "Ronnie" Miller both reconnects with her estranged father Steve and falls in love with local Will Blakelee during a summer in a quiet Southern United States beach town.

Sparks was approached to write both the film's screenplay and the novel. Sparks completed the screenplay in January 2009, prior to the completion of the novel, making The Last Song his first script to be optioned for film. The setting, originally in North Carolina like the novel, relocated to Georgia after the states had campaigned for months to host production. Upon beginning production in Tybee Island, Georgia, and nearby Savannah, The Last Song became the first movie to be both filmed and set on Tybee Island. Filming lasted from June 15 to August 18, 2009, with much of it occurring on the island's beach and pier.

The Last Song was released by Touchstone Pictures on March 31, 2010, and was later released on Blu-ray and DVD on August 17, 2010. The film garnered unfavorable reviews from critics, who criticized the script and Cyrus' performance, with many arguing she was miscast in the lead role. In spite of this, it grossed $89 million worldwide against a $20 million budget, making it a box office success.

== Plot ==
Following her parents’ divorce three years ago, 17-year-old Veronica "Ronnie" Miller has shown rebellious and defiant behavior. She has not spoken to her father, Steve, since the divorce, and has given up playing piano, which she loved since childhood because of her father’s influence.

Ronnie and her younger brother, Jonah, travel to Georgia to spend the summer with their father, a former Juilliard professor and concert pianist who now lives quietly in his hometown of Wrightsville Beach.

Upon arrival, Ronnie befriends Blaze, an outcast who lives with her boyfriend Marcus. That night, Marcus makes advances towards Ronnie. Blaze, mistakenly believing Ronnie had initiated the flirting, vengefully frames her for shoplifting.

Later, Ronnie discovers a loggerhead sea turtle nest by her dad's house. While protecting it from raccoons, she meets Will Blakelee, a charming and popular aquarium volunteer whose attempts at friendship she had initially rebuffed. After spending the whole night defending the eggs together, she finds herself intrigued by him.

The next day, Will takes Ronnie to the aquarium. Upon learning that he has an extensive dating history, furious, she tries to break it off with him, but he kisses her passionately. Will takes Ronnie to the large, gated mansion he lives, where she meets his parents and sister, whom he assumed were away. After Will confides that his brother died recently, he and Ronnie profess their mutual love.

At Will’s volleyball game, Ronnie overhears locals discussing a church that burned down, hinting that Steve was responsible for the fire. When Ronnie later laments this to Will, he urges his best friend Scott to divulge the truth about what happened, but Scott refuses.

While Will, Ronnie, Jonah, and Steve are watching the turtle eggs hatch, Steve collapses so they rush him to the hospital. There, Ronnie and Jonah learn that their father has terminal cancer, which has spread to his lungs. Ronnie stays with Steve in the hospital, while Jonah and Will return home to continue rebuilding the stained-glass window to replace one lost in the fire. As Steve’s cancer progresses, he eventually requests hospice.

Eventually, Scott and Will confess to Steve that the church had accidentally ignited while they and their other friends were playing with fire behind it; they allowed Steve to accept the blame. Steve opts not to relay the truth to law enforcement, but Ronnie breaks up with Will, horrified that he has allowed her father to carry the guilt for so long.

Ronnie and Jonah’s mother Kim arrives to take Jonah back home to New York City, while Ronnie stays in Georgia to take care of Steve and make up for lost time with him. Because his hands are aching, she continues working on a composition he has written, titled "For Ronnie." He listens to her play and dies just as she finishes.

While delivering a eulogy at his funeral, Ronnie declares that no words could ever express how wonderful her father was, and instead opts to play their song. Afterwards, Will meets her outside the church and compliments the song before disappearing into the crowd. Having decided to attend Juilliard, she is packing up to return home when she sees Will outside. He apologizes for everything and reveals his intention to transfer to Columbia University to be with her, and they passionately kiss.

== Cast ==
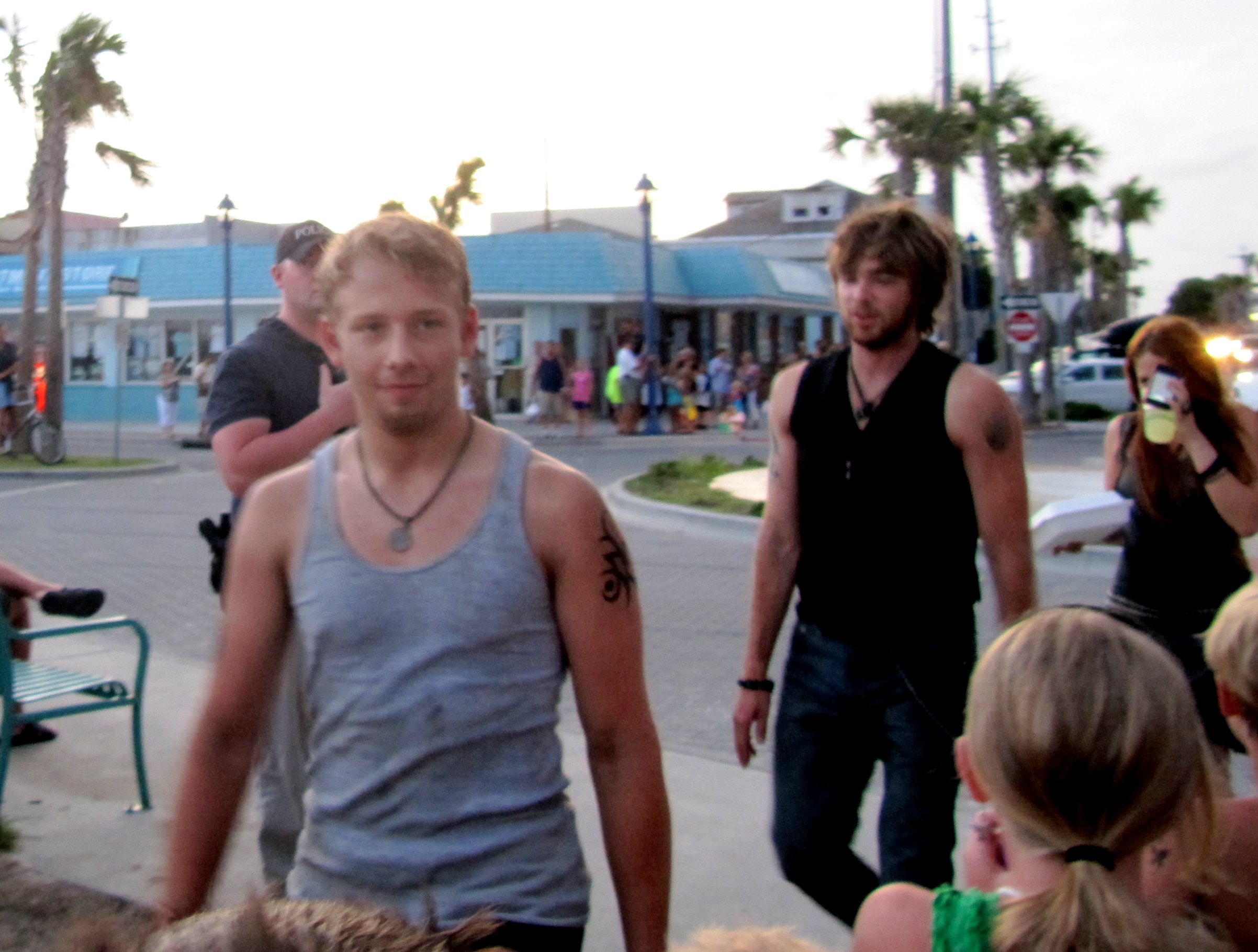
From left to right, cast members Adam Barnett, Nick Lashaway, and Carly Chaikin make their way to the filming of the bonfire scene under the Tybee Island pavilion on July 30, 2009

- Miley Cyrus as Veronica "Ronnie" L. Miller, an angry, rebellious 17-year-old forced to spend a summer with her estranged father. She later falls in love with Will.
- Liam Hemsworth as Will Blakelee, a popular and skilled beach volleyball player, Will aspires to attend a top university and volunteers at the Georgia Aquarium. He is Ronnie's love interest.
- Greg Kinnear as Steve Miller, Ronnie and Jonah's father, Kim's ex-husband, and former Juilliard School professor and concert pianist, who moved to Georgia after his divorce. After being diagnosed with terminal cancer and despite loving his family, he separated from them in order to cope.
- Kelly Preston as Kim Miller, Ronnie and Jonah's mother and Steve's ex-wife who raised her children in New York City after her divorce.
- Bobby Coleman as Jonah Miller, Ronnie's younger brother.
- Nick Lashaway as Marcus, Blaze's abusive boyfriend.
- Carly Chaikin as Blaze, a rebel who befriends Ronnie shortly after arriving in Georgia.
- Adam Barnett as Teddy, a friend of Marcus.
- Kate Vernon as Susan Blakelee, Will's disapproving mother.
- Nick Searcy as Tom Blakelee, Will's father.
- Melissa Ordway as Ashley, Will's ex-girlfriend.
- Carrie Malabre as Cassie, Ashley's best friend.
- Rhoda Griffis as one of Steve's doctors.
- Lance E. Nichols as Pastor Charlie Harris, the kind, devout pastor of the local church.
- Hallock Beals as Scott, Will's best friend.
- Stephanie Leigh Schlund as Megan Blakelee, Will's older sister.

== Production ==
=== Development ===
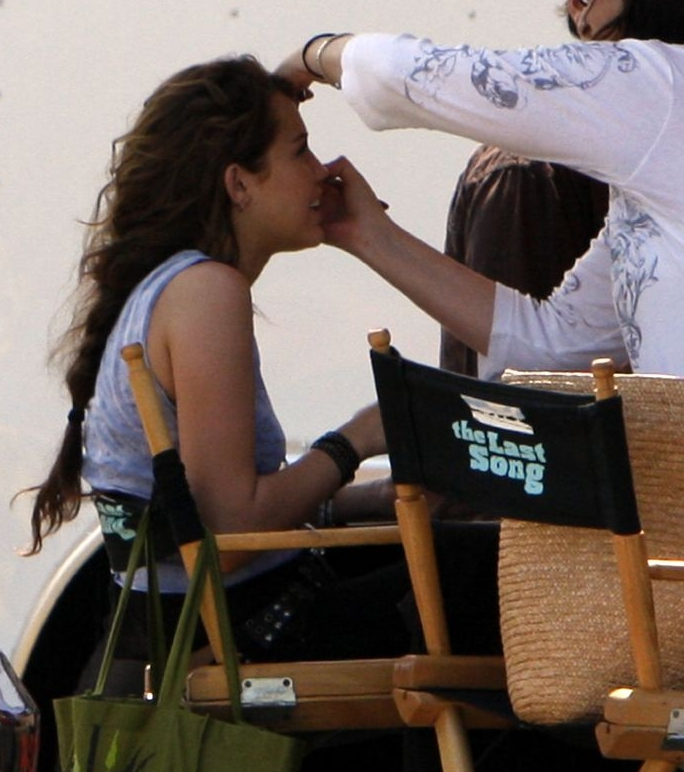
Actress Miley Cyrus sits in make-up on set

The Last Song began when Disney executive Jason Reed met with Miley Cyrus to discuss her future career plans. At the time, Cyrus had been known mainly for starring as a pop star on Disney Channel's Hannah Montana, a children's television series that had expanded into a globally successful media franchise. As the series neared its end, Disney hoped to create a star vehicle to help Cyrus break out of the pop persona she had developed through the franchise and to introduce Cyrus to older audiences. During her meeting with Reed, Cyrus expressed a desire to film a movie similar to A Walk to Remember, a 2002 film based on a novel by Nicholas Sparks. A Walk to Remember helped Mandy Moore, then a teen pop star much like Cyrus, launch an acting career. Disney called Adam Shankman, director of A Walk to Remember, who signed on to produce the potential Cyrus film along with his sister and Offspring Entertainment production company partner, Jennifer Gibgot. Tish Cyrus, Cyrus' mother and co-manager, became the film's executive producer. Cyrus' acting representation, United Talent Agency, then contacted Sparks, also a UTA client, to ask if he had plans for a novel appropriate for a film adaptation starring Cyrus.

At the time, Sparks had been wrapping up The Lucky One and beginning to ponder an original plot for his next book. The author told himself he could "either go younger than 20 or older than 50", having recently written about every age in between. Wary of venturing above 50 again after his best-seller The Notebook, Sparks had already been leaning toward writing a teenager story when he received a phone call from Gibgot on behalf of the film in August 2008. Sparks recalled, "Jennifer asked if I had anything laying around? I said no, but funny you should say that…" Sparks returned with a premise by the end of July 2008. Once the proposal had been agreed upon by Cyrus, her family, and Offspring Entertainment, Sparks, with the aid of co-screenplay writer Jeff Van Wie, completed the screenplay before starting the book. Sparks explained that such an arrangement was necessary to accommodate filming in summer 2009, as Disney had scheduled, but, "this is similar to the way it's gone with movies based on my novels; it's just out of order." Sparks and Van Wie completed the first draft of the screenplay in December 2008, the first rewrite later that month, and the second and final rewrite in January 2009. Both rewrites took about one or two days, and Sparks found them relatively simple. The finished screenplay was approximately 100 pages long. While The Last Song is not the first screenplay Sparks has written, it is his first to be optioned for film. The novel was completed in June 2009, the same time shooting for the film began, and was published on September 8, 2009 by Grand Central Publishing. The plot of the film and novel remained secret throughout development.

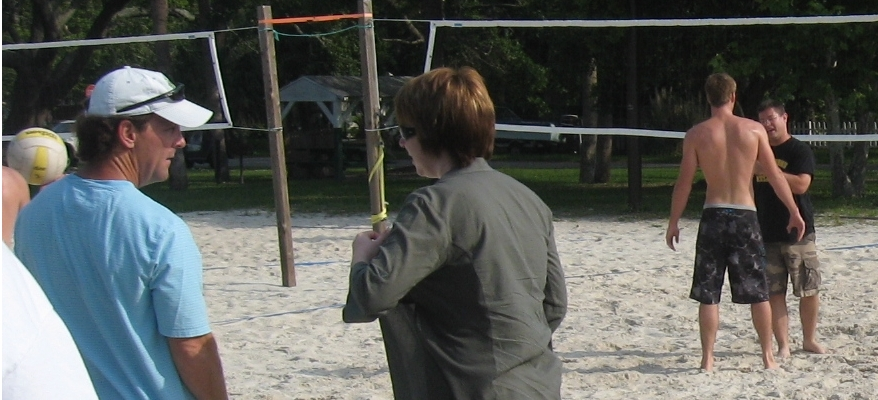
Director Julie Anne Robinson talks to stunt coordinator Cal Johnson while Liam Hemsworth is coached on beach volleyball.

Julie Anne Robinson signed on to direct the film in May 2009, attracted by the emotion present in the story. The Last Song is Robinson's first feature film, although she is a veteran of television and theater. Robinson previously helmed episodes of American series such as Weeds and Grey's Anatomy and earned a Golden Globe nomination and a BAFTA award for her work on the BBC series Viva Blackpool.

In a June 2009 blog entry, Cyrus said she had "always been a fan of Nicholas Sparks" and that she had been waiting to do a production separate from the Hannah Montana franchise "for a long time", but had not found the time to do so due to her TV show, music, tours, and Hannah Montana: The Movie. To film The Last Song, Cyrus' contract for season four of Hannah Montana included an extra-long hiatus.

=== Writing and title ===
Recognizing the popularity of A Walk to Remember as both a novel and film, Sparks "put all [his] thoughts into that, trying to make the story as different from A Walk to Remember as [he could], but try to capture the same feelings." Sparks' experiences as a father and as a high-school track and field coach also helped shape the plot, and characters Jonah Miller and Will Blakelee are respectively based on Sparks' sons Landon and Miles. Sparks felt Ronnie was the hardest character to write for because he had "never been a 17-year-old, angry teenage[d] girl". Ronnie became a composite character inspired by several young women Sparks has known, such as his nieces. Cyrus herself influenced Ronnie fairly little, although her singing career did inspire the musical elements of the story. Ronnie plays only the piano and Cyrus only sings a small amount in the film, though she does contribute to its soundtrack.

Disney did not give Sparks limitations on the topics featured in The Last Song, which include underaged drinking, infidelity, and terminal illness, but Sparks says that Disney desired to work with him in part because "they've read my novels. My teenagers… don't do bad things. I just don't write that. I don't write about adultery, I don't write profanity ... I'll certainly have love scenes in my novels, but they're always between consenting adults." Still, Sparks acknowledges that elements of the screenplay may have been toned down by the director or the studio after he finished. As dictated by the Writers Guild of America, Sparks receives full credit for his work, although the amount of his original screenplay retained in the film is uncertain. For example, Sparks says the character of Marcus, leader of the gang of thugs, was likely altered for the film.

The project remained nameless for several months after Sparks' initial meeting with Disney in July 2008. Sparks wrote in a September 2008 online chat that "I have the idea completed, but no title. That's common for me though. Titles come last." The film was referred to by the working title "Untitled Miley Cyrus Project" In March 2009, Variety magazine called "The Last Song" a "tentative" title.

=== Casting ===
Cyrus chose the name "Ronnie" for her character in honor of her grandfather, Ron Cyrus, who died in 2006. Unknown to many, the character had first been named "Kirby" by Sparks and later changed to "Hilary". New interviews with Sparks reveal he imagined Cyrus in the role "only a little" during the writing process. At the completion of the screenplay, Sparks was concerned that Cyrus would not be able to successfully execute the role: "The first thing I thought when I finished the screenplay was, wow, I hope she can do this, this is a tough role because I'm bringing you through a whole gamut of emotion and you're just a 16-year-old girl who's done the Disney Channel. Are you able to do this as an actress?", After visiting the set and watching Cyrus film, Sparks' worries abated. To play the New York teen, Cyrus worked with a dialect coach to lose her Southern accent and learned to play classical piano. After she completed filming, Cyrus said that in a case of life imitating art, she had matured and "changed a lot" over the course of her summer in Georgia, similar to the way Ronnie does in the film. "Showing this movie, I feel like I'm really showing a part of my growth as a person as well. So I'm really excited for people to see it."

In April 2009, Disney officials chose Rafi Gavron for the part of Will Blakelee, but switched to Australian actor Liam Hemsworth by May. On May 18, 2009, the decision to cast Greg Kinnear as Steve Miller was made final. Kelly Preston's part as Kim was the first role she had accepted since the death of her son, Jett Travolta. After being introduced to Cal Johnson, the film's stunt coordinator, Adam Barnett landed the role of Teddy in May 2009 due to his previously developed talent in juggling and hackey sack.

=== Post-production ===
The Last Song entered post-production following the end of filming on August 18, 2009. Automated dialogue replacement took place in mid-September; Beals and Chaikin stated they had gone in to record on September 11 and September 18, respectively. Chaikin said she had worked for five and a half hours. The director's cut was presented to the studio on October 1, 2009. The Motion Picture Association of America reviewed the film and issued it a PG rating for "thematic material, some violence, sensuality and mild language" three weeks later.

== Filming ==
=== Move to Georgia ===
Nobody knows what's going to happen [...] Georgia wants them badly, and we want them badly, and by Monday, there'll be four or five other states that want them badly.

— Bev Perdue, Governor of North Carolina

The Last Song had originally been set in Wrightsville Beach and Wilmington in North Carolina. Though they wished to shoot on location, filmmakers also examined three other states and identified Georgia as the next-best filming site. Georgia's housing prices were higher, but the state's filming incentive package refunded 30% of production costs such as gasoline and salaries. North Carolina's package refunded 15% and excluded salaries of over $1 million. Still, Disney remained interested in North Carolina and offered to film there if the state would reduce the amount the company would save in Georgia, around $1 million, in half. North Carolina officials searched for ways to accomplish this, including applying unsuccessfully for state and Golden LEAF Foundation grants. They also introduced legislation to improve the state's refund to 25%, which eventually passed on August 27, 2009. Disney decided to work within existing incentive laws and agreed to film in North Carolina as long as the film rights they had bought from Sparks counted as a production cost, thereby saving the company an additional $125,000 to $225,000. Then-North Carolina Governor Bev Perdue set up a press conference on April 1, 2009, to announce N.C.'s victory. North Carolina tax collectors refused to consider the film rights, forcing Perdue to cancel the conference at the last second. "I was hopeful to say that it was coming and now I don't know that I'll get to say that," Perdue said. "Nobody knows what's going to happen [...] I don't know what figures they got from Georgia, but Georgia wants them badly, and we want them badly, and by Monday [April 6, 2009], there'll be four or five other states that want them badly." Johnny Griffin, director of the Wilmington Regional Film Commission, explains: "Disney makes feature films. They also make television series; they make individual movies for the Disney Channel. By losing this one project, in essence, we've lost all of those opportunities." He also notes the loss of jobs and tourism filming would have created.

On April 9, 2009, after three months of deliberation, the decision to relocate to Georgia was made final. To determine the specific town, location scouts scoured the state for an aged, isolated, oceanfront property to use as the Miller family's home in the film. After another three months and the discovery of the "Adams Cottage" on the southern tip of Tybee Island, Tybee and neighboring locations became the sites of filming in late March, with the intention of masquerading the area as Wilmington and Wrightsville Beach, North Carolina. The locale proved too unique to disguise. "We had a hard time trying to hide the fact that this was Tybee and Savannah was Savannah," said Bass Hampton, the film's location director. Filmmakers convinced the screenwriters to change the setting of the film and to Tybee Island, thus allowing them to incorporate landmarks such as the Tybee Island Light Station and the Savannah Historic District. The setting of Sparks' novel remained in North Carolina. Though other movies have been filmed in Tybee Island, The Last Song is the first to be both filmed and set in Tybee Island. With the city's name plastered on everything from police cars to businesses, Georgia officials predicted a lasting effect on the economy. In addition, The Last Song is estimated to have brought up to 500 summer jobs to Georgia, $8 million to local businesses, and $17.5 million to state businesses.

=== Sets ===
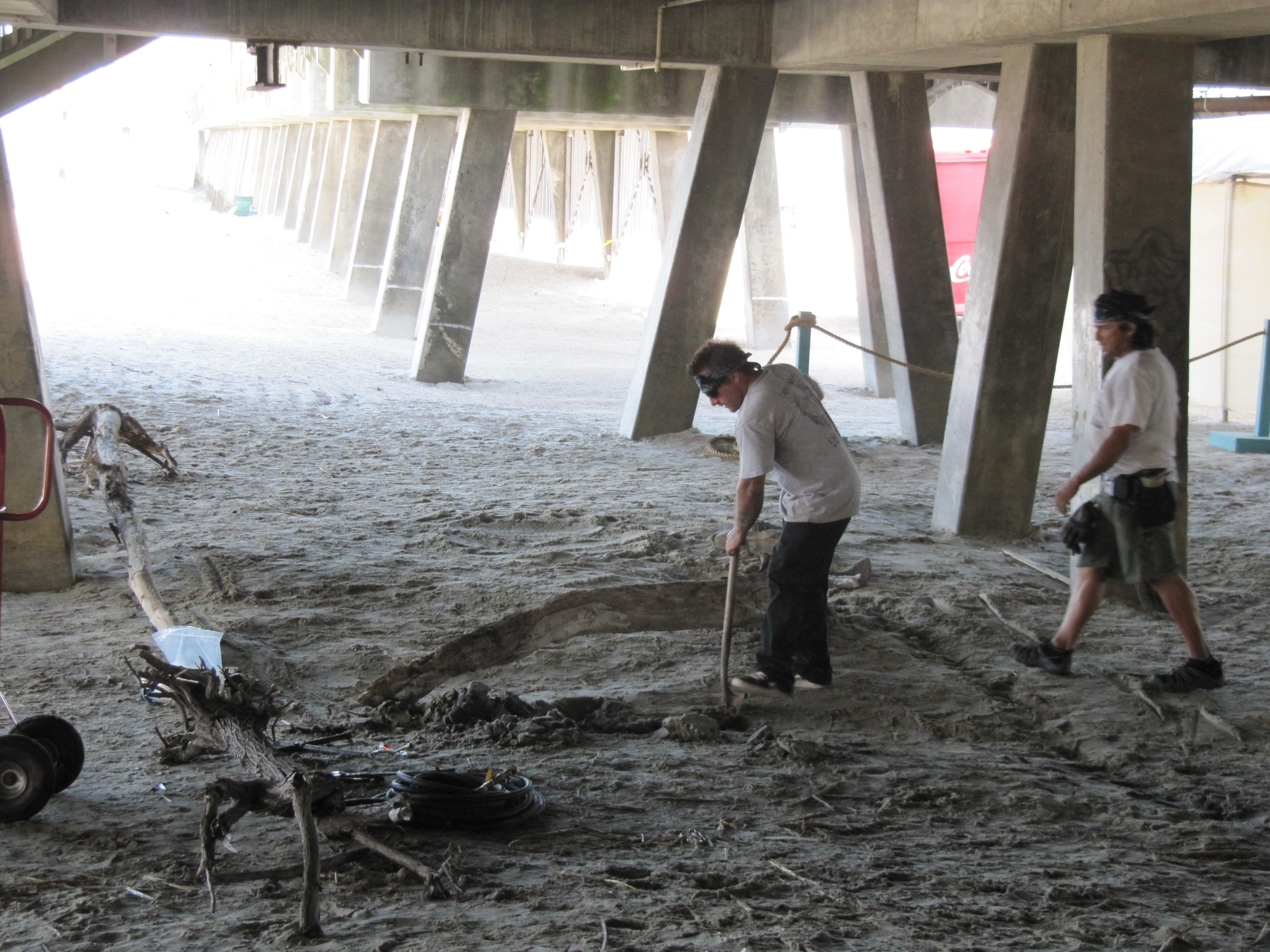
The Last Song crew members installed propane pipes and gas lines to create a controlled burn for the bonfire scene.

Nelson Coates is the production designer for The Last Song, responsible for all visual aspects of the movie. Coates, who was nominated for an Emmy Award for his work on the Stephen King television miniseries The Stand, arrived 11 weeks prior to the start of filming to do prep work. While most of the filming took place on the natural Tybee Island beach or on preconstructed private property, Coates oversaw the re-painting of the pier and the construction of the carnival and church.

Location scouts had searched the entirety of Georgia for an aged, isolated, oceanfront property to use as a home for the Millers for nearly three months before scout Andy Young came across the "Adams Cottage" on the southern end of Tybee Island. "It was getting down to zero hour," said Young. "Often, it's about the house. It can be a character itself in the movie." The house's owner, Sam Adams, welcomed filming as "an opportunity to sort of immortalize the house," in case it is destroyed by storms. The two-story, six bedroom house was built by Adams' great-grandfather in 1918 and was made entirely out of hard pine wood with very few painted surfaces. According to Savannah Morning News reporter Lesley Conn, it "was built in classic rambling beach style [... designed] to allow ocean breezes to sweep through wide, wraparound porches into cool, heart-pine rooms."

The church set was built over a six-week period on a vacant lot on the corner of 13th Street and Sixth Avenue, near residential homes. The one-room, 2,000-square-foot (190 m^{2}) building seats roughly 80 people and is estimated to be worth $250,000 to $350,000. Special-effects coordinator Will Purcell subdued concerns about the church burning scene by stating that the building would not actually be set on fire. The intended menacing effect is "all camera angles. It is a safe environment for actors to do their work." Several techniques were used to simulate the fire, including the use of propane pipes to shoot flames through the church windows. At the end of filming, Cyrus hoped to fly the church set back to her family's estate in Tennessee. Disney agreed to donate the building to the island after Tybee officials lobbied to keep it, with the condition that its connection to The Last Song not be advertised. The set will be moved to a new location and brought up to code for use as a nondenominational chapel for island weddings; renovations are expected to cost approximately $600,000.

=== Shooting schedule ===
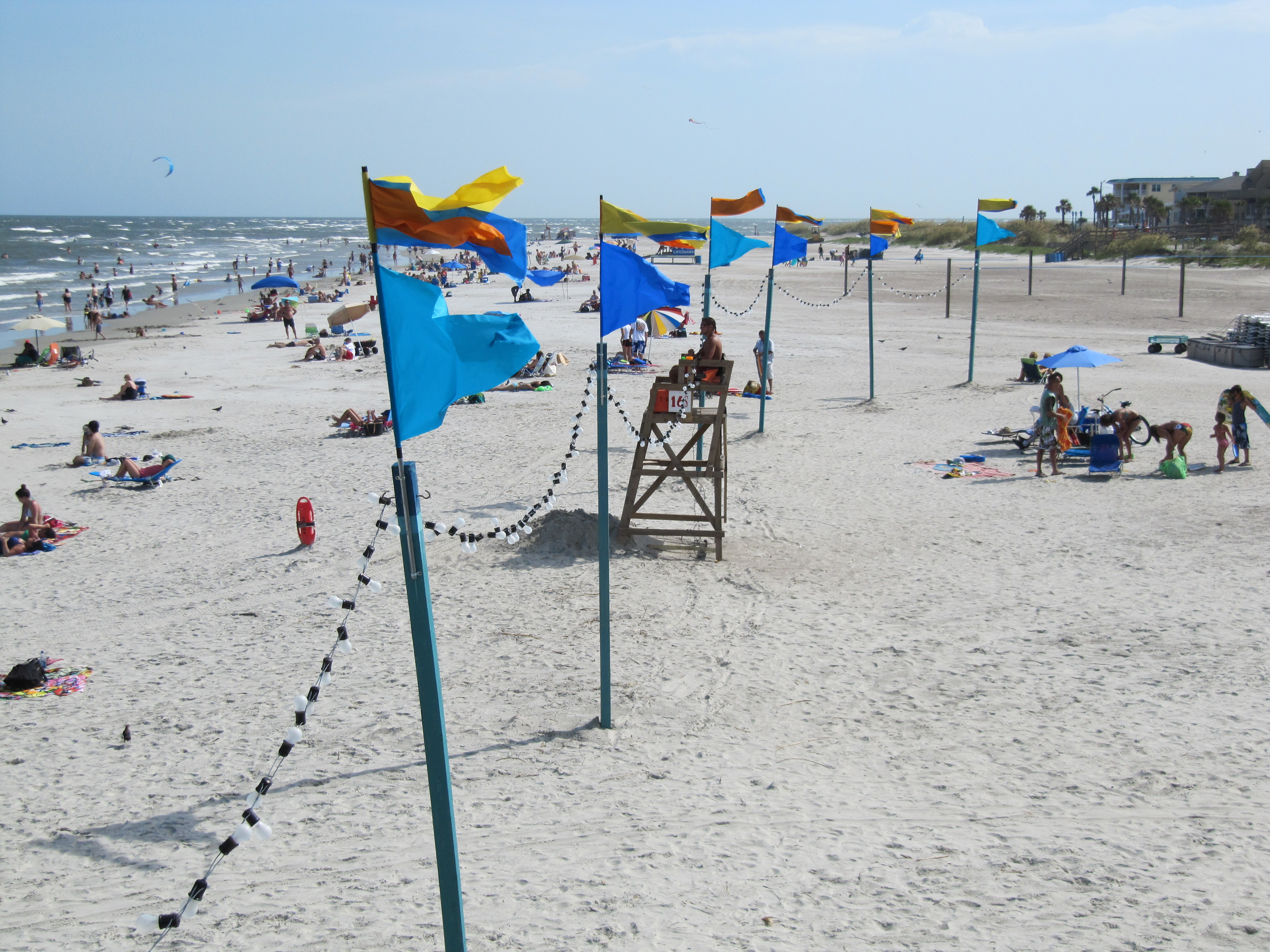
Remnants of the carnival set, such as these flags and light strings, were re-established to create the illusion that the beach scenes filmed in late July had taken place during the festival filmed in June.

Cyrus' busy schedule necessitated that filming take place over the summer. Sparks noted, "She's got a fall music tour and then she's back filming Hannah Montana in the spring again. So, the only time she had free in her schedule was over the summer." Principal photography began on June 15, 2009 and finished on August 18, 2009. Filming did not take place during weekends.

On the first day of production, Cyrus and Hemsworth filmed a kiss in the ocean. Other scenes which took place in June included the carnival and volleyball tournament, both of which were filmed on the beach near the Tybee Island pier. Filming at the pier wrapped up on June 23, 2009 after shooting the scene in which Kim drops off Ronnie and Jonah to live with Steve. Scenes of the church fire were shot on July 10, 2009. Filming at the Georgia Tech Savannah campus began on July 16. Kinnear finished taping on July 17, 2009. Wedding scenes and a key driving scene were filmed at the Wormsloe Historic Site between July 20 and July 23 for twelve hours each day. Driving scenes in Isle of Hope, Georgia continued to the 28. By July 30, the movie had returned to Tybee Island for more beach scenes. Chaikin's character framed Cyrus' for stealing a watch on August 6. On August 10, Hemsworth performed an oil change and Cyrus browsed an upscale boutique in downtown Savannah for the movie. The funeral was filmed from August 11, 2009 to August 13, 2009 at the church set in Tybee Island. On August 15, further church burning scenes took place. The wrap party was held on the 16, and the cast and crew arrived in Atlanta the following day to spend the last days of filming at the Georgia Aquarium. After analyzing the area on the 17th, the movie began shooting in public areas at dawn on the 18th to avoid crowds. Once the aquarium opened to the public at 10:00, filming shifted to behind-the-scenes areas.

=== Loggerhead sea turtles ===
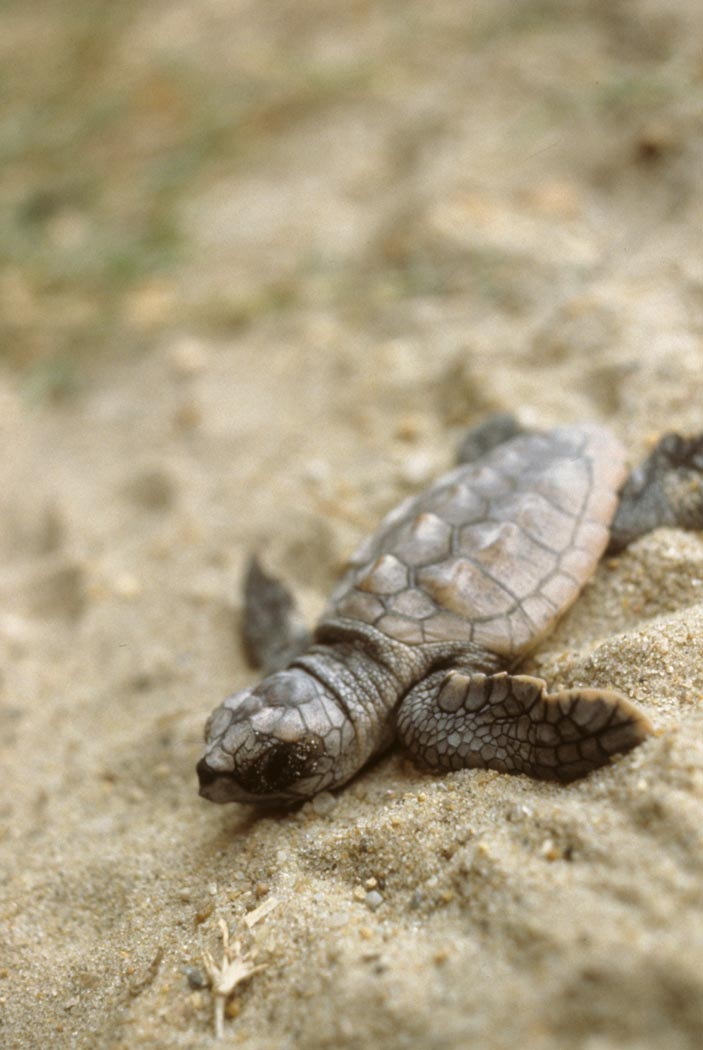
The loggerhead sea turtle hatchlings featured in the film were stragglers collected from nests on Tybee Island and Sapelo Island.

Due to the conflicting personalities of his protagonist couple, Sparks faced difficulty in finding a vehicle that would draw Will and Ronnie to spend time together. "It had to be during the summer, she [Ronnie] had to be new in town, and whatever happened had to start in June and end in August. Because you always want a conclusion," said Sparks of his requirements. He mentioned summer camp or a summer job as typical vehicles used in books, but dismissed them as unoriginal and boring. "So it's got to be original, it's got to be interesting, and at the same time it's got to be universal, that you feel like it could happen to anybody." Sparks eventually chose to have Will and Ronnie bond over a loggerhead sea turtle nest, knowing that loggerhead eggs often hatch in August. The scene of the hatching nest took place during the first week of August and involved 26 live loggerhead sea turtle hatchlings. Sea turtle hatchlings have an innate sense to head toward the ocean water as soon as they are born, so scenes of the nest hatching had to be taken swiftly. Said Mike Dodd of the Georgia Department of Natural Resources, the biologist who supervised the scene, the hatchlings "did all they know how to do: They crawled down to the water and swam off." Sparks told an interviewer he suspected filmmakers would digitally add more turtles to the scene. At the time of filming, the loggerhead sea turtle was listed as a threatened species. The environmentally friendly theme was an added bonus to Tybee Island, which was then promoting ecotourism.

== Soundtrack ==
The original soundtrack which used to promote the film, featuring its songs, were released through Hollywood Records on March 23, 2010, eight days ahead of the film's release. It featured contributions from OneRepublic, Alpha Rev, Allstar Weekend, José González, Maroon 5, Edwin McCain, Eskimo Joe, amongst several others. Cyrus performed two songs for the film: "When I Look at You" and "I Hope You Find It". The former was originally included from her EP The Time of Our Lives, and was released as a single on February 16, 2010. The soundtrack saw a major increase in sales in the week of the film's DVD release.

== Release ==
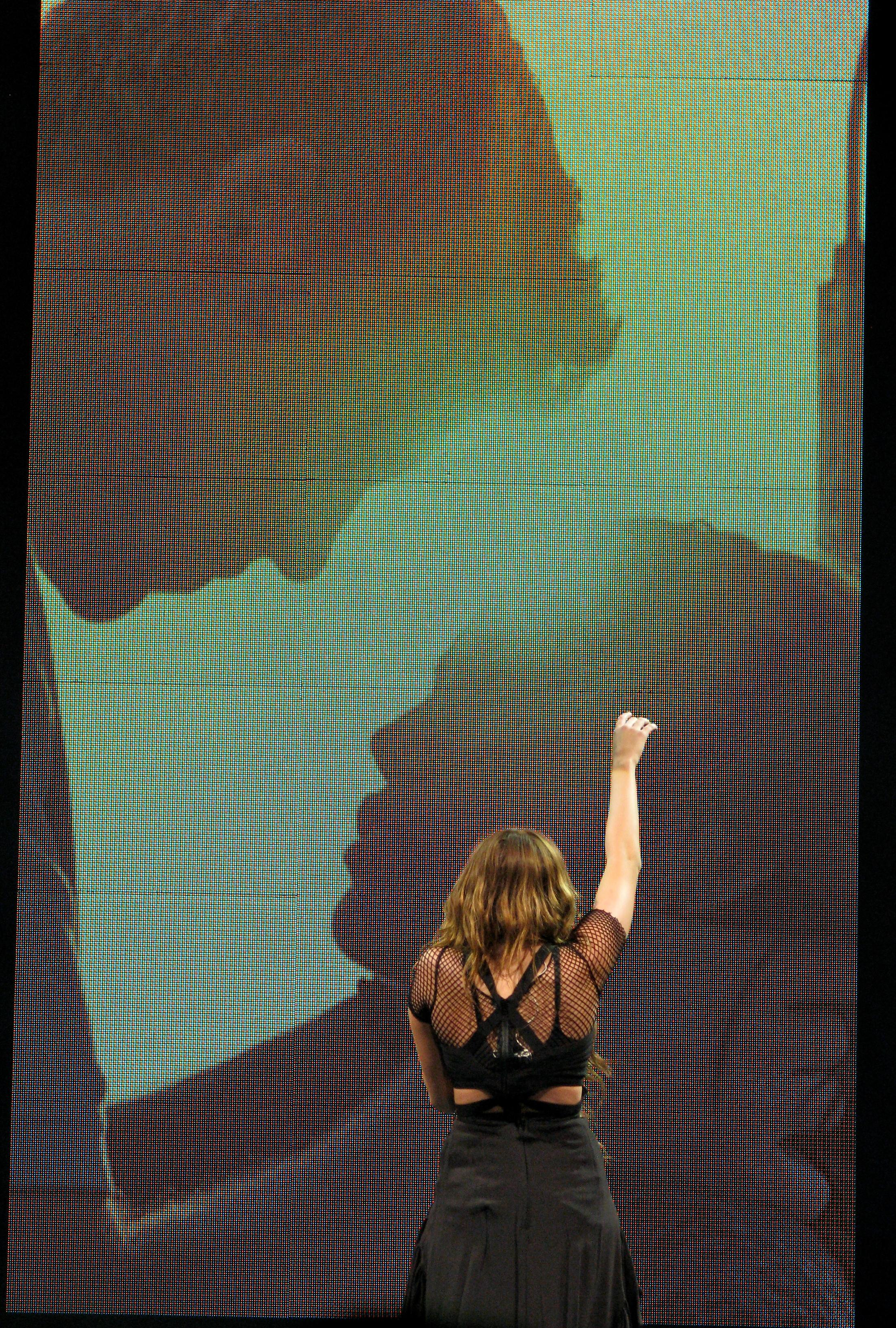
Cyrus sings "When I Look at You" during her Wonder World Tour while facing a screen playing a film clip of Will and Ronnie.

Walt Disney Studios Motion Pictures originally scheduled The Last Song for wide release on January 8, 2010, but was delayed from January 8, 2010 to March 31, 2010.

=== Marketing ===
Upon the release of the novel on September 8, Sparks began a book tour reaching around 13 cities and gave several interviews. During these events, he discussed writing both the novel and the screenplay. Cyrus and Walt Disney Studios Chairman Dick Cook discussed the film on September 11, 2009 at the first D23 Expo. The first clips from the film appeared online on September 11, 2009, interspersed within one version of the "When I Look at You" music video. The film's first trailer was integrated into Cyrus' Wonder World Tour and premiered during the tour's opening night on September 14, 2009 in Portland, Oregon. Midway through each concert, the trailer was shown on large video screens surrounding the stage. After it finished, Cyrus played a white piano and sang "When I Look at You" while film clips continued to play on the screens behind her. On November 16, 2009, the first three film stills were released via the film's Facebook page. The following day, the film's trailer premiered online. The film's premiere was held in Los Angeles on March 25, 2010. Cyrus was originally planned to go to the UK premiere of the film, but due to the April 14, 2010 eruption of the volcano Eyjafjallajökull that blanketed Europe in volcanic ash and grounded all flights to and from the continent, she was unable to attend.

=== Home media ===
The Last Song was released on DVD and Blu-ray on August 17, 2010.

== Reception ==
=== Box office ===
The Last Song performed well for when it was released for the first time, garnering $5,125,103 on approximately 3,300 screens at 2,673 theaters for an average of $1,917 per theater.

It has grossed $62,950,384 in North America and $26,091,272 in other territories for a worldwide total of $89,041,656.

In its opening weekend, the film grossed $16,007,426, finishing fourth at the box office behind Clash of the Titans ($61,235,105), Why Did I Get Married Too? ($29,289,537) and How to Train Your Dragon ($29,010,044).

=== Critical response ===
The Last Song holds a 22% approval rating on the review aggregation website Rotten Tomatoes, based on 120 reviews with an average rating of 4.2/10. The critical consensus is summarized: "As shamelessly manipulative as any Nicholas Sparks production, The Last Song is done no favors by its miscast and over matched star, Miley Cyrus." Metacritic, which assigns normalized ratings to films, The Last Song holds a "generally unfavorable" score of 33% based on 27 reviews.

Reviewers were critical of Sparks' and Van Wie's screenplay and formulaic storyline. Mick LaSalle of the San Francisco Chronicle says the screenplay's faults include several "scenes that make no emotional sense" and claims, "The plot construction is weak. Incidents don't flow one into the next." When reviewing Cyrus's performance, critics acknowledged her stage presence, but were frequently critical of her acting abilities. Jay Stone of The Ottawa Citizen says Cyrus's portrayal of angry Ronnie "consist[s] of pouting and sneering [...] Cyrus doesn't have a lot of range, but she does have presence." Rob Nelson of Variety writes, "Cyrus, alas, hasn't yet learned not to act [...] But she does show off her considerable chops as a pianist and remains reasonably likable throughout." A. O. Scott of The New York Times believes that although "her Hannah Montana persona has a certain aggressive charm", in The Last Song she "play-act[s] rather than exploring the motives and feelings of her character." Roger Ebert gave the film a mixed 2.5/4. He praised the acting and directing, but derided the plot and Sparks's writing.

Kinnear's performance has been widely praised. A. O. Scott writes, "it's nice to see Mr. Kinnear play an entirely sympathetic character for a change [but] his slyness and subtlety seem wasted in a project that has no interest in either." Michael Phillips of The Chicago Tribune writes, "Reliably honest and affecting, [Kinnear] fights off the waves of corn in much the same way that Tibetan monk defied the tsunami in 2012." Glen Whipp of the Associated Press writes, "Kinnear lends the movie a dignity it doesn't deserve". Stone advises, "I'd watch out for Liam Hemsworth". Stephen Witty of The Star-Ledger commends "newcomer Carly Chaikin [who] plays the "bad girl" ... with an exciting mixture of wildness and vulnerability. Halfway in, I began wishing desperately that Chaikin was playing the lead." Reception for Coleman was mixed; Jeff Vice of "Deseret News" calls him a "hammy irritant" while Jon Bream of the Star Tribune writes, "The most memorable acting is by Coleman, 12 [... who] gets a lot of great lines and delivers them with aplomb".

=== Accolades ===
Teen Choice Awards
2010	Choice Movie: Drama	The Last Song cast and crew	Nominated
2010	Choice Movie Actress: Drama	Miley Cyrus	Nominated
2010	Choice Movie Breakout Star: Male	Liam Hemsworth	Won
2010	Choice Movie: Liplock	Miley Cyrus & Liam Hemsworth	Nominated
2010	Choice Movie: Chemistry	Miley Cyrus & Liam Hemsworth	Nominated
2010	Choice Movie: Dance Scene	Miley Cyrus & Liam Hemsworth	Nominated
2010	Choice Movie: Hissy Fit	Miley Cyrus	Won
2010	Choice Music: Love Song	When I Look At You	Won
Kids' Choice Awards
2011	Favorite Movie Actress	Miley Cyrus	Won
Golden Raspberry Award
2010	Worst Actress	Miley Cyrus	Nominated
Nickelodeon Australian Kids' Choice Awards 2010
2010	Favorite Movie Actress	Miley Cyrus	Won
2010	Cutest Couple	Miley Cyrus & Liam Hemsworth	Nominated
2010	Favorite Kiss	Miley Cyrus & Liam Hemsworth	Won
