= The Guardian (novel) =

2003 novel by Nicholas Sparks

- First edition
- Author: Nicholas Sparks
- Language: English
- Genre: Novel
- Publisher: Warner Books
- Publication date: 2003
- Publication place: United States
- Media type: Print (hardcover)
- Pages: 489 pp
- ISBN: 978-0-446-69611-1
- Preceded by: Nights in Rodanthe
- Followed by: The Wedding

The Guardian is the seventh novel by the American writer Nicholas Sparks. The book is about a Great Dane named Singer who is the pet of a widow named Julie who is trying to find a new life partner. Among those she considers are Mike, an old friend of hers, and Richard, a successful manager.

== Themes ==
The novel deals with the themes of obsessive love, as it attempts to show the inner world of a highly intelligent murderer living with no ethics at all.
