= Two by Two (novel) =

Novel written by Nicholas Sparks

- Author: Nicholas Sparks
- Publication date: 2016
- ISBN: 9781455520695

Two by Two is a novel written by Nicholas Sparks. It is Sparks' 20th novel, and was published in 2016, 20 years after his first novel, The Notebook.

== Plot ==
Russell Green has a family consisting of his daughter and his wife, Vivian. One day, Vivian leaves the family to get a job far from their home. Now, Russell needs to take care of his daughter without the help of Vivian.

== Soundtrack ==
As a gift for the people who purchase Two by Two, the author, Nicholas Sparks, collaborated with JD Eicher to create a soundtrack that comes with the book.

== Reception ==
The Columbus Dispatch wrote: "His 20th work, "Two by Two," extends his impressive collection of literary tales." Cosmopolitan wrote: "The first 200 pages of this tome is a slow march toward divorce (note: Nicholas Sparks and his wife divorced in 2015), and as such, there isn’t a ton of romancing in this novel."
