= Every Breath (disambiguation) =

Every Breath is a 2018 novel by Nicholas Sparks.

Every Breath may also refer to:

- "Every Breath", a song by Tracy Bonham from her 1996 album The Burdens of Being Upright
- "Every Breath", a 1994 thriller film starring Judd Nelson and Joanna Pacuła
- "Every Breath", a song by Boyce Avenue from their 2010 album All We Have Left
- "Every Breath", a song by Gungor from their 2011 album Ghosts Upon the Earth
- "Every Breath", a song by Hillsong Worship from their 2019 album Awake
