= At First Sight (novel) =

2005 romance novel by Nicholas Sparks

- Hardback cover of At First Sight
- Author: Nicholas Sparks
- Language: English
- Genre: Romance, tragedy
- Publisher: Grand Central Publishing
- Publication date: October 18, 2005
- Publication place: United States
- Media type: Print (Hardcover, Paperback)
- Pages: 288 pages

At First Sight is a 2005 romance novel by Nicholas Sparks. Set in North Carolina, At First Sight is the sequel to Sparks's previous book, True Believer, written in the same year. At First Sight was originally the result of a 45-page epilogue in True Believer. Sparks’s editor thought this was too long for an epilogue and damaged the effect of True Believer. It was then that Sparks got the idea to write At First Sight as its predecessor.

== Plot ==
At First Sight begins after Jeremy's proposal. In New York City Lexie and Jeremy are preparing to move Jeremy to their future home, Boone Creek. Lexie is making Jeremy keep the baby a secret from his family and friends and the residents of Boone Creek until after the wedding, because she doesn't want people to get the wrong impression of why he and Lexie have decided to get married after only a few weeks of knowing each other. The only people that know of the pregnancy are Jeremy's long time best friend Alvin, and Lexie's grandmother, Doris.

When Jeremy and Lexie return to Boone Creek, Jeremy finds himself unable to find the inspiration to write any new columns for his magazine. This adds to the stress of buying a new house for his new family and having a child on the way. Doris tries to help Jeremy with this problem by giving him her book. Doris is the town psychic and has the specialty of predicting the sex of a newborn baby, and records it all in her book. Doris suggests that Jeremy try to write about the journal for a new column.

=== Trouble in Paradise ===
Rodney is a character featured in True Believer as a longtime friend of Lexie that has been after her for years until Jeremy came along. By the end of the previous novel he starts to be interested in his and Lexis other longtime friend, Rachel. By this book they are an established couple, who have been having problems in their relationship. Rachel feels as though Rodney is still not over Lexie, and would be with her if she weren't marrying Jeremy. One day Jeremy finds Lexie sitting alone with Rodney talking and holding hands. He immediately feels this is suspicious but tries to tell himself that it was nothing and he was simply making it into something it wasn't, even if Rodney had been after Lexie for years. Jeremy later confronts Lexie about what she had done that day, in which case she fails to mention anything about seeing Rodney that day. Jeremy receives an anonymous email saying only “how do you know the baby is yours?” This paired with his supposed inability to conceive leaves Jeremy with his mind racing, suspecting it may have been someone else's, Rodney's in particular, but once again reminding himself that Lexie wasn't capable of such a thing and that nothing had ever become of her and Rodney, and he decides to not tell Lexie.

=== Rachel leaves ===
Sometime later, Rachel runs off for a few days without telling anyone, leaving Rodney, Doris and Lexie all feeling worried. Lexie cancels her dinner plans with Jeremy and says she is going over to Doris's house to talk and comfort her, but when Jeremy checks up on her he finds her car at Rodney's instead. Feeling angry that Lexie had once again lied went to her house and waited outside for her to get back. When she returns he confronts her about Rodney and Lexie explains that she went over to her grandmothers like she said and then decided to console Rodney. They have a heated argument and Jeremy goes back to the local motel where he had been staying.

=== The second email ===
When he gets back, Jeremy receives a second anonymous email, this time saying “Hasn't she told you the truth? Read Doris's journal. You'll find the answer there.” Moments later, Lexie shows up crying and the two end up working things out. Jeremy still does not tell Lexie about the emails, not yet knowing what to say or make of them. Jeremy searches for what the email might be referring to, and after numerous times going through and analyzing the book, he finds it; a prediction from four years earlier of a miscarriage with Lexie's initials and the name of the father. Jeremy is angered that Lexie had never told him of this and feels she has lied to him for the third time. The two end up in an even more heated argument after closing on their new house, and this time when Jeremy leaves he's heading back to New York City for his bachelor party. There he discovers the sender of the anonymous emails was his best friend, Alvin who doesn't want the couple to get married after such a short period of time. Jeremy learns that when Rachel ran away, she had gone to New York City and visited Alvin, who she had met in the previous novel, and spilled the secret about Lexie's previous miscarriage and the documentation of it in the journal, and that's how Alvin knew of it. Jeremy is furious telling Alvin he never wants to hear from him again, and gets the next flight back to Boone Creek on the sit

When Jeremy returns, he and Lexie have a long talk and both admit that they were both wrong, and Jeremy fills her in on the emails, Alvin, and Rachel. Everything is explained from then that the baby was in fact, despite the odds, definitely Jeremy's and that there was nothing between Lexie and Rodney. Rachel avoids Lexie and Doris for a short time until finally coming to Lexie's house, apologizing and explaining how she accidentally told Alvin about the pregnancy and they make up. They have a wonderful wedding a short time later where Lexis deceased parents were married.

=== The baby ===
When Jeremy and Lexie go to their ultrasound appointment, they learn that an amniotic band threatened their baby with possible deformities if it were to attach, or even its life. Jeremy and Lexie spend the last ten weeks of her pregnancy in fear and distress over the news. Lexie tells Jeremy that they can move to New York for Jeremy, in hopes of Jeremy finding inspiration to write again. Jeremy briefly thinks on this offer and quickly turns down her offer. Moments later, Jeremy finds inspiration to write his next column and his writing rut was over.

Lexie wakes Jeremy up early in the morning to inform him that she was in labor. With this news Jeremy freaks out like any expecting father and was a mess for the whole experience. Lexie successfully delivers their daughter, Claire, named after Lexie's deceased mother; however Lexie dies immediately after giving birth, leaving her grandmother Doris and Jeremy in anguish and Jeremy, a widowed parent.

=== Epilogue ===
In the epilogue, Claire is now four and Jeremy has adjusted with life without Lexie. Claire has been having nightmares for a few weeks several times every night, like Lexie had when she was young after her parents had died. Jeremy takes her to a very special place for Jeremy and Lexie, the cemetery where Lexie and her parents had been buried, where a phenomenon occurs around midnight on foggy nights. After this Claire no longer has nightmares after seeing this phenomenon exactly like her mother had.

== True Believer (prequel) ==
At First Sight starts its story where True Believer left off, but skips a little in-between the two books. True Believer introduces the romance between New York City resident, Jeremy Marsh and Boone Creek resident, Lexie Darnell. In the first novel, Jeremy is a writer that goes to a small town in North Carolina, Boone Creek, to chase a story. There he meets Lexie, the town librarian. Jeremy is charmed by Lexie and the two end up falling in love. Jeremy went through a divorce a few years before mainly due to his inability to conceive children, but the book ends with Lexi holding her stomach asking Jeremy if he “believed in miracles” and that her psychic grandmother, Doris, predicted it was a girl; she was pregnant with his child. The book shows that since True Believer Jeremy had proposed to Lexie after a very brief dating period.

== Reviews ==
Publishers Weekly describe the ending as “majorly manipulative and totally effective.” John M. Formy-Duval from about.com, shares his opinion of the novel being a cliché.
