= Dear John (2010 film) =

- Theatrical release poster
- Directed by: Lasse Hallström
- Screenplay by: Jamie Linden
- Based on: Dear John by Nicholas Sparks
- Produced by: Marty Bowen; Wyck Godfrey; Ryan Kavanaugh
- Starring: Channing Tatum; Amanda Seyfried; Henry Thomas; Scott Porter; Richard Jenkins
- Cinematography: Terry Stacey
- Edited by: Kristina Boden
- Music by: Deborah Lurie
- Production companies: Screen Gems; Relativity Media; Temple Hill Entertainment
- Distributed by: Sony Pictures Releasing
- Release date: February 5, 2010 (United States)
- Running time: 108 minutes
- Country: United States
- Language: English
- Budget: $25 million
- Box office: $115 million

Dear John is a 2010 American romantic war drama film directed by Lasse Hallström, based on the 2006 novel by Nicholas Sparks. It follows the life of a soldier (Channing Tatum) after he falls in love with a young woman (Amanda Seyfried), who decide to exchange letters after he is deployed to Afghanistan.

Dear John was released in North America on February 5, 2010, by Sony Pictures Releasing. The film received mixed reviews from critics, and grossed $115 million against a $25 million budget.

== Plot ==
Staff Sergeant John Tyree is shot in Afghanistan while serving in the United States Army Special Forces in 2003. In voice-over, he recalls a childhood trip to the U.S. Mint and compares himself to a coin in the United States military before stating that the last thing he thought of before he blacked out was "you."

In 2001, John is on leave in Charleston, South Carolina. He meets Savannah Curtis, a college student building homes for Habitat for Humanity while on spring break. Savannah invites John to a bonfire party where he meets her neighbor Tim and his autistic son Alan. Over the next two weeks, they go on several dates and fall in love.

Savannah meets John's father, who is obsessed with his growing coin collection, mentioning to John his father may be autistic like Alan. An upset John storms off and during a fight accidentally strikes Tim, breaking his nose. Savannah sees the commotion and stops speaking to him. John apologizes to Tim, who offers to give Savannah a message. She spends one last day together with John before his deployment, and they promise to continue their relationship long distance, via letters which will tell each other everything happening in their lives.

John and Savannah's plans to start a life together after his discharge from the Army go awry when the September 11 attacks occur, and John extends his deployment overseas. Savannah spends more time with Tim, deciding she wants to build a farm with horse stables to provide therapy and respite for autistic children. John and Savannah's romance continues for two years through their letters until Savannah sends a literal "Dear John" letter to break up with him, explaining she still loves him but has become engaged to someone else.

After being shot in Afghanistan, John is encouraged to return home, but he re-enlists for a second time. Four more years pass, and he is sent home after his father suffers a stroke. At his father's bedside, John recites a letter he wrote to him, repeating the voiceover from the start of the film. The letter confesses that the first thing to cross John's mind after he was shot was coins, and the last thought before he lost consciousness was of his dad. Soon afterward, his father dies.

After the funeral, John visits Savannah and learns she married Tim, abandoning her dream of a riding camp for autistic kids because of the high cost and Tim's lymphoma. She takes John to the hospital to see him and Tim tells him that Savannah still loves him. Back at the house, John and Savannah enjoy a quiet evening together, tempted to pick up where they left off years earlier, but do not follow through. John leaves distraught.

John sells his father's coin collection, keeping a valuable mule coin they found together years earlier. He donates the money to Tim's cancer treatment, and returns to the military, carrying the mule coin as a good luck charm. A final letter from Savannah tells him they received an anonymous donation, but Tim died from his illness after only two months of treatment.

Months later, John returns home as a civilian. Parking his bike in town, he sees Savannah at a coffee shop, where they reunite and embrace.

== Cast ==
- Channing Tatum as SSG John Tyree
- Amanda Seyfried as Savannah Lynn Curtis
- Henry Thomas as Tim Wheddon
- Richard Jenkins as Bill Tyree
- Luke Benward as Alan Wheddon
  - Braeden Reed as Young Alan Wheddon
- Scott Porter as Randy
- D.J. Cotrona as Noodles
- Cullen Moss as Rooster
- Gavin McCulley as Starks

== Soundtrack ==
Dear John OST

Soundtrack album by Various Artists
- Released: February 2, 2010
- Genre: Various
- Length: 33:30
- Label: Relativity Music Group

No.	Title	Music	Length
1.	"Paperweight"	Joshua Radin & Schuyler Fisk	3:22
2.	"The Moon"	The Swell Season	4:40
3.	"Amber"	311	3:29
4.	"Exelsior Lady"	The Donkeys	3:34
5.	"Things & Time"	The Wailing Souls	3:22
6.	"Little House"	Amanda Seyfried	3:17
7.	"The is the Thing"	Fink	4:25
8.	"Think of Me"	Rosi Golan	3:09
9.	"You Take My Troubles Away"	Rachael Yamagata & Dan Wilson	3:39
10.	"Dear John Theme"	Deborah Lurie	1:53
Total length:			33:30

== Music ==
The score to Dear John was composed by Deborah Lurie, who recorded her score with the Hollywood Studio Symphony at the Warner Brothers Eastwood Scoring Stage right after finishing her score for 9. A soundtrack album containing songs was released on February 2, 2010, from Relativity Media Group, and a score album was released digitally the same day.

== Release ==
The film was released on February 5, 2010, in the United States.

== Reception ==
=== Box office ===
Dear John has grossed $80,014,842 in North America and $34,962,262 in other territories for a worldwide total of $114,977,104.

In its opening weekend, the film grossed $30,468,614, finishing first at the box office, knocking off Avatar after seven weekends in first place and making it the best debut for a film based on a Nicholas Sparks novel.

The film was the second-highest debut for a film opening Super Bowl weekend, just shy of Hannah Montana & Miley Cyrus: Best of Both Worlds Concert in 2008.

=== Critical reception ===
The film received mixed reviews from critics. On Rotten Tomatoes, the film holds a 28% approval rating based on 136 reviews, with an average score of 4.50/10. The website's critics consensus reads: "Built from many of the same ingredients as other Nicholas Sparks tearjerkers, Dear John suffers from its clichéd framework, as well as Lasse Hallstrom's curiously detached directing." Metacritic, which assigns a weighted average score out of 100 from film critics' reviews, reports a rating of 43 based on 34 reviews, indicating "mixed or average" reviews.

== Accolades ==
Year	Award	Category	Work	Result
2010	MTV Movie Awards	Best Male Performance	Channing Tatum	Nominated
2010	MTV Movie Awards	Best Female Performance	Amanda Seyfried	Nominated
2010	Teen Choice Awards	Choice Movie: Drama	Dear John	Nominated
2010	Teen Choice Awards	Choice Movie Actor: Drama	Channing Tatum	Nominated
2010	Teen Choice Awards	Choice Movie Actress: Drama	Amanda Seyfried	Nominated
2010	Teen Choice Awards	Choice Movie: Chemistry	Amanda Seyfried and Channing Tatum	Nominated
2011	People's Choice Awards	Favorite Drama Movie	Dear John	Nominated
2011	ASCAP Film and Television Music Awards	Top Box Office Films	Deborah Lurie	Won
2011	CinEuphoria Awards	Top Ten of the Year – Audience Award	Lasse Hallström	Won
2011	CinEuphoria Awards	Top Ten of the Year – International Competition	Lasse Hallström	Won
2011	CinEuphoria Awards	Best Actor – International Competition	Channing Tatum	Won

== Home media ==
Dear John was released on DVD and Blu-ray on May 25, 2010.
