= See Me =

See Me may refer to:

- See Me (novel), a 2015 novel by Nicholas Sparks
- See Me (Ronnie Lane album), 1979
- See Me (Leela James album), 2021
- "See Me", a song by Roxette from Crash! Boom! Bang! (1994) and Travelling (2012)
- "See Me" (song), a 2005 single by Melanie Blatt
- "See Me", a 2021 song by King Gizzard & the Lizard Wizard from L.W.
- "See Me", a 2019 song by Kelly Rowland
- "See Me" (Law & Order: Criminal Intent), an episode of Law & Order: Criminal Intent
- See.me, an American website for artists
