= The Last Song (novel) =

2009 novel by American author Nicholas Sparks

- First edition
- Author: Nicholas Sparks
- Original title: The Last Song
- Language: English
- Series: Last song
- Genre: Romance, Tragedy
- Publisher: Grand Central Publishing
- Publication date: September 1, 2009
- Publication place: United States
- Media type: Print (Hardcover, Paperback)
- Pages: 405 pages (including the prologue and epilogue)
- ISBN: 0-446-54756-5
- OCLC: 405107195

The Last Song is a 2009 novel by American author Nicholas Sparks. The Last Song is Sparks's fourteenth published novel (fifteenth published book), and was written specifically as the basis for the film adaptation by the same name. It was released on September 1, 2009, by Grand Central Publishing. The story revolves around the summer of Veronica “Ronnie" Miller's seventeenth year, during which she is sent to stay with her estranged father. Through their shared love of music, the duo reconnect.

== Plot ==
17-year-old Veronica "Ronnie" Miller is a troubled teenager who wants to live her own life and is trying her very best to ignore her divorced parents: Kim, her mother with whom she lives in New York, and Steve, her father who lives in his hometown of Wrightsville Beach, NC. Her mother decides that it would be in everyone's best interest if Ronnie and her 10-year-old brother, Jonah, spent the summer in Wrightsville Beach with Steve. Jonah is excited, while Ronnie can only wonder why her parents hate her so much as to send her there for the summer.

Once they arrive, Kim leaves and Ronnie runs off to the carnival down at the beach, where she watches a volleyball game in the crowd. As she turns to leave, one of the players, the privileged Will Blakelee, knocks into her while trying to reach the ball, spilling her soda all through the front of her shirt.

In search of a stand selling apparel, Ronnie bumps into Blaze, an estranged teen like herself. Blaze helps her find a T-shirt booth and they leave to watch a show by Marcus, Blaze's boyfriend, on the pier. The show includes "harmless" fireballs, and when it's over, the police run Marcus off. They go to sit under the pier, where Blaze heads off to get Marcus another beer. In Blaze's absence, Marcus attempts to hit on Ronnie, causing her to leave.

Later, when Ronnie finds a nest of Loggerhead turtle eggs in danger of raccoons behind her house, she decides to camp out next to it to save it. She learns that Will volunteers at the aquarium, and after a few nights of talking with him on the beach, she realizes she has feelings for him.

Ronnie then finds out that her dad has cancer. As his cancer progresses, she, Jonah, and Will finish piecing together a stained glass window while Ronnie also finishes her dad's song for him on the piano. Pastor Harris, Steve's friend, then installs the window in the new church. Kim arrives to say goodbye to Steve one last time and take Jonah home. Ronnie stays with Steve. Will had left in August to go to Vanderbilt; however, he shows up at the funeral once Steve has passed. He tells Ronnie that he is joining Columbia with her.

== Release ==
A book tour for The Last Song was announced on July 11, 2009 and reached around 13 cities. Despite the relatively short tour, The Last Song debuted at number one on weekly bestseller charts. It headed the Publishers Weekly and New York Times charts for hardback fiction and the Wall Street Journal chart for fiction. According to USA Today's chart, which combines sales of all formats of a book, The Last Song outsold all other titles in its first week. The book dropped to number 2 on all lists the following week, due to the release of Dan Brown's highly anticipated The Lost Symbol, the sequel to The Da Vinci Code.

== Film adaptation ==
The film version of The Last Song was released in the U.S. on March 31, 2010, Unlike previous adaptations of Sparks's novels, Sparks participated in writing the film's screenplay; after agreeing to the project, Sparks invited his college roommate Jeff Van Wie to co-write the script. With Van Wie's help, Sparks finished the screenplay before he began writing the novel. The Last Song is director Julie Anne Robinson's first feature film. The film stars Miley Cyrus as Ronnie, along with Greg Kinnear as Steve, Liam Hemsworth as Will Blakelee, Kelly Preston as Kim, and Bobby Coleman as Jonah.
