= Counting Miracles =

2024 novel by Nicholas Sparks

- First edition cover
- Author: Nicholas Sparks
- Audio read by: Holter Graham
- Language: English
- Publisher: Random House
- Publication date: September 24, 2024
- Publication place: New York
- Media type: Print
- Pages: 368
- ISBN: 9780593449592 (hardcover first edition)

Counting Miracles is a novel written by Nicholas Sparks. It was published on September 24, 2024, by Random House.

== Plot ==
After his grandmother reveals his biological father's name, ex-Ranger Tanner Hughes goes in search of him to Asheboro, North Carolina, where he encounters single mother Kaitlyn Cooper.

== Reception ==
The novel debuted at number one on The New York Times combined fiction best-seller list for the week ending September 28, 2024. It was Sparks's 20th book to top the chart.

Publishers Weekly wrote that Sparks "enriches Kaitlyn and Tanner's love story with a striking supporting cast" and delivers an "emotionally satisfying finale" to the mystery of Tanner's father.

== Film adaptation ==
In October 2024, it was announced that Amazon MGM Studios would develop a film adaptation of Counting Miracles. Alan Ritchson, who will star in the lead role as part of his three-picture acting deal with the company, will also produce the film through his AllyCat Entertainment company alongside Dan Spilo of Industry Entertainment; Denise Di Novi and Margaret French Isaac of Di Novi Pictures; and Sparks' longtime producing partner Theresa Park.
