= Three Weeks with My Brother =

2004 novel by Nicholas and Micah Sparks

- Author: Nicholas Sparks and Micah Sparks
- Subject: Novelists, American -- 20th century -- Biography; Voyages and travels
- Published: April 2004 (Warner Books)
- Pages: 356
- ISBN: 0-446-53244-4
- OCLC: 62924109
- Dewey Decimal: 813/.54 22
- LC Class: PS3569.P363 Z475 2004

Three Weeks with My Brother is a book written by Nicholas Sparks and his brother Micah.

This book is an account of their three-week trip around the globe as well as the memories of their family life from childhood to adulthood. As the only surviving members of their family, the two brothers embarked on this journey to visit the wonders of the world. However, on this journey, they discovered themselves. They discovered the truth about life, loss, and love.

== Reception ==
The book has received reviews from publications including Publishers Weekly, Entertainment Weekly, The Best of Times, and People. The book was a New York Times Best Seller.
