= Nights in Rodanthe =

2008 film by George C. Wolfe

- Theatrical release poster
- Directed by: George C. Wolfe
- Screenplay by: Ann Peacock; John Romano
- Based on: Nights in Rodanthe by Nicholas Sparks
- Produced by: Denise Di Novi
- Starring: Richard Gere; Diane Lane; Scott Glenn; Christopher Meloni; Viola Davis
- Cinematography: Affonso Beato
- Edited by: Brian A. Kates
- Music by: Jeanine Tesori
- Production companies: Village Roadshow Pictures; Di Novi Pictures
- Distributed by: Warner Bros. Pictures
- Release date: September 26, 2008
- Running time: 97 minutes
- Country: United States
- Language: English
- Budget: $30 million
- Box office: $84.4 million

Nights in Rodanthe is a 2008 American romantic drama film. It is an adaptation of Nicholas Sparks' 2002 novel. The film stars Richard Gere and Diane Lane in their third screen collaboration after The Cotton Club (1984) and Unfaithful (2002).

Lonely, divorced surgeon Paul Flanner travels to the remote island town, Rodanthe, to make amends to the husband of a patient who died on the operating table for a routine procedure, where he sparks up a romance with Adrienne Wills, the unhappily married woman looking after his North Carolina inn.

It was filmed in the small seaside village of Rodanthe, the northernmost village of the inhabited areas of Hatteras Island as well as North Topsail Beach, North Carolina.

== Plot ==
Adrienne Willis is in the process of getting a divorce from her husband Jack after he left her for another woman. Their separation has caused a rift between her and their rebellious teenage daughter, Amanda. One morning, when picking up Amanda and their son Danny for a weekend visit, Jack tells Adrienne he still loves her and wants to move back home. She tells him she needs time and space to think.

Adrienne drives to Rodanthe, North Carolina to look after a friend's bed-and-breakfast for a few days. It is a house right on the beach, partially in the surf at high tide. The only guest for the weekend is surgeon Paul Flanner.

Paul suffers from flashbacks of a surgery that ended tragically, which has made him cold and frustrated. A woman with a non-malignant hemangioma on her face her whole life so wanted it removed, died on the operating table due to a complication of the anesthesia. The family of the patient who died lives in Rodanthe and is suing for wrongful death.

As a storm arrives, Paul and Adrienne work together to protect the inn, covering the windows and bringing in things that could blow away. They dine together, share stories and grow close. They eventually turn to each other for emotional support when the hurricane hits.

A genuine romance begins and they fall in love. With Adrienne's advice and moral support, Paul finds the courage to visit the deceased patient's widower. He also feels guilty for passing up a relationship with his son Mark in favor of his career, and plans to visit Ecuador, where Mark is working as a physician in an impoverished community, to repair their relationship and help.

During their separation, Adrienne and Paul exchange numerous letters, expressing their longing to be together again. On the evening that Adrienne and Paul are to reunite, he does not show up. Soon thereafter, Mark arrives at Adrienne's door with a box of Paul's personal belongings. He had been killed in a flash mudslide while attempting to save medical supplies. Mark thanks Adrienne for "giving him back the father he knew when he was a child".

Over the following weeks, Adrienne struggles with the grief of losing Paul. Eventually, Amanda coaxes the story from her mother. A turning point for their relationship, Adrienne begins to deal with her loss. She tells her daughter the story of the very special type of love she found with Paul, and encourages her to seek that out for herself someday.

Adrienne returns to Rodanthe and sees a small herd of wild horses on the beach by the inn. She, her children, and her best friend walk down to the dock where she and Paul once danced.

== Cast ==
- Diane Lane as Adrienne Willis
- Richard Gere as Dr. Paul Flanner
- James Franco as Dr. Mark Flanner
- Scott Glenn as Robert Torrelson
- Christopher Meloni as Jack Willis
- Carolyn McCormick as Jenny
- Viola Davis as Jean
- Pablo Schreiber as Charlie Torrelson
- Mae Whitman as Amanda Willis
- Charlie Tahan as Danny Willis

== Post-production ==
The house was damaged in a hurricane after the movie was filmed. New owners bought the house and relocated it to another part of the Outer Banks. Tourists to the area can rent portions of the house and stay in specific rooms that have been remodeled to appear as they did in the film (actual interior scenes were filmed on sound stages). The name of the house was Serendipity and has since been named Inn at Rodanthe. In 2024, it is on the market.

== Reception ==
=== Box office ===
Nights in Rodanthe has grossed $41.9 million in North America and $42.5 million in other territories for a worldwide total of $84.4 million.

In its opening weekend, the film grossed $13.4 million, finishing second at the box office behind Eagle Eye ($59.6 million). It became Warner Bros.' thirteenth highest-grossing release of 2008.

=== Critical reception ===
According to review aggregator Rotten Tomatoes, the critical consensus holds that the film is "derivative and schmaltzy" and "strongly mottled by contrivances that even the charisma of stars Diane Lane and Richard Gere can't repair". The site rates the movie as "rotten", with a score of 30% based on 132 reviews. Metacritic scored the film with a 39/100, or "generally unfavorable", based on 26 critics' reviews. Although the movie was panned, it grossed $84.4 million worldwide.

The Times included Nights in Rodanthe on its 100 Worst Films of 2008 list. In 2010, Time magazine named it one of the 10 worst chick flicks ever made.

== Accolades ==
Year	Award	Category	Recipient(s)	Result
2009	AARP Movies for Grownups Awards	Best Grownup Love Story	Diane Lane and Richard Gere	Nominated

== Home media ==
Nights in Rodanthe was released on DVD and Blu-ray on February 10, 2009.
