= Message in a Bottle (film) =

1999 American film directed by Luis Mandoki

- Theatrical release poster
- Directed by: Luis Mandoki
- Screenplay by: Gerald Di Pego
- Based on: Message in a Bottle by Nicholas Sparks
- Produced by: Kevin Costner; Denise Di Novi; Jim Wilson
- Starring: Kevin Costner; Robin Wright; John Savage; Illeana Douglas; Robbie Coltrane; Paul Newman
- Cinematography: Caleb Deschanel
- Edited by: Steven Weisberg
- Music by: Gabriel Yared
- Production companies: Bel Air Entertainment; Di Novi Pictures; Tig Productions
- Distributed by: Warner Bros. Pictures
- Release date: February 12, 1999
- Running time: 131 minutes
- Country: United States
- Language: English
- Budget: $30 million
- Box office: $118 million

Message in a Bottle is a 1999 American romantic drama film directed by Luis Mandoki and based on Nicholas Sparks's novel Message in a Bottle. The film stars Kevin Costner, Robin Wright (under her then-married name Robin Wright Penn) and Paul Newman. It was filmed in Maine, Chicago, and Wilmington, North Carolina. Its plot follows Chicago Tribune writer-researcher Theresa Osborne, who seeks the writer of a letter inside a bottle then falls in love with its shipbuilder author.

Message in a Bottle was released in the United States by Warner Bros. Pictures on February 12, 1999. The film received generally negative reviews from critics, but was a box-office hit, grossing $118 million against a $30 million budget.

== Plot ==
Former reporter Theresa Osborne works as a researcher for the Chicago Tribune. On a trip to Cape Cod, she finds an intriguing, typed love letter in a bottle in the sand, addressed to Catherine. Theresa is fascinated by it and shows it to her colleagues. They print it in their newspaper without Theresa's knowledge and receive a multitude of responses.

One of the letters contains an attached letter that was addressed to the same person, on the same letterhead and typed in the same tone. Later, they receive another letter of the same kind from one of the readers that was not addressed to Catherine, but was typed on the same stationery. Eventually, they track down the author with the help of the typewriter and the letterhead used. His name is Garrett Blake, and he lives quietly on the Outer Banks of North Carolina, near his father, Dodge. Catherine is Garrett's wife who died from cancer and he's having trouble dealing with her death which is why he wrote the message in a bottle.

Theresa goes to the Outer Banks to research it further, but when she meets him, they are mutually attracted and start becoming better acquainted. She tries to tell him about the original purpose of her visit but fears that she might lose him, so postpones it. Along with the literal distance between them — they live hundreds of miles apart — there is another problem: Garrett cannot quite forget the deceased Catherine.

Theresa's career flourishes as the romantic "message in a bottle" tale is told in print without naming names. Garrett makes a trip to Chicago to visit Theresa and her young son. They seem very happy together for a day, but when he finds his letters in her nightstand, he becomes upset and starts to leave.

When Theresa reveals that there are three letters of the same kind, he becomes intrigued, as he wrote only two of them so doubles back to see the other letter. The third, which in fact was not addressed to Catherine, was actually written by her. In it, she reveals her love, knowledge of her impending death, and how she was content with her life with Garrett, however short it might be. He departs with the letter, leaving Theresa in tears.

Garrett moves on with his life and sets things straight with Catherine's family, who had been battling with him for Catherine's artwork. He finishes his personalized boat with the help of Catherine's brother. He names it Catherine in her honor, and invites Theresa to its christening.

When Theresa arrives, she witnesses Garrett's passionate speech about Catherine. She understands that he is still in love with his late wife, so leaves. Theresa lets him know he is welcome to call her when he thinks that he is ready to start a new life.

After that night, Garrett writes a letter to Catherine, puts it in a bottle and goes sailing. A storm breaks out, and he heroically tries to save a family from their sinking boat. Garrett succeeds in saving two of the three. However, he drowns while trying to rescue the mother.

Dodge calls Theresa to inform her of Garrett's death. Heartbroken, she goes there to bid farewell. Dodge gives her the letter that Garrett had intended for Catherine, found on his boat. He wrote that he had found someone else; Theresa, who is as dear as Catherine to him. He had decided to start a new life with her so asks for Catherine's blessing.

Although devastated, Theresa returns home contented, stating that, although this experience left her in grief, it helped her to feel the most important thing in life.

== Cast ==
- Kevin Costner as Garrett Blake
- Robin Wright Penn as Theresa Osborne
- Paul Newman as Dodge Blake
- John Savage as Johnny Land
- Illeana Douglas as Lina Paul
- Robbie Coltrane as Charlie Toschi
- Jesse James as Jason Osborne
- Bethel Leslie as Marta Land
- Tom Aldredge as Hank Land
- Viveka Davis as Alva
- Raphael Sbarge as Andy
- Richard Hamilton as Chet
- Rosemary Murphy as Helen at the B&B
- Steven Eckholdt as David
- Susan Brightbill as Catherine Blake
- Steve Mellor as Man on Dock
- Lance Gilbert as Man on Sinking Boat
- Jennifer Lamb as Woman on Sinking Boat
- Hayden Panettiere as Girl on Sinking Boat

== Production ==
The film rights at an auction, was sold to Denise Di Novi for Warner Bros. Pictures, who inherited the contract from the now-defunct Turner Pictures, in 1997.

=== Filming ===
The producers originally planned to film in Tangier, Virginia, but the Tangier town council voted against allowing it due to the drinking, swearing and sex in the script.

Warner Bros. tried Chilmark, Martha's Vineyard, but the Chilmark Conservation Commission turned down a request to build a temporary 3,000-square-foot (280 m^{2}) house on stilts in the dunes near Chilmark Pond. Beach scenes were filmed at Popham Beach in Phippsburg, Maine. No filming was done at the Outer Banks (the setting of the novel).

=== Music ===
Irish music group Clannad wrote the song "What Will I Do" for the film. Singer Richard Marx also composed the song "One More Time", sung by Laura Pausini, which plays during the closing credits.

== Reception ==
=== Box office ===
The film grossed $52.9 million in North America, and $66.0 million in other territories, for a worldwide total of $118.9 million. In its opening weekend, the film grossed $18.9 million, finishing first at the box office, knocking Payback from the top spot.

=== Critical reception ===
Message in a Bottle received generally negative reviews from critics. On the review aggregator website, Rotten Tomatoes, the film holds a 32% rating, based on 38 reviews, with an average rating of 5.2/10. The site's consensus states: "Handsome-looking but dramatically inert, Message in a Bottle maroons a formidable cast in a trite romance that lacks spark." Metacritic reports a 39 out of 100 rating, based on 23 critics, indicating "generally unfavorable" reviews.

Roger Ebert of the Chicago Sun-Times gave the film two stars out of four, praising the lead actors, particularly Newman, who "steals every scene he's in", but criticized the contrived ending. Todd McCarthy of The Hollywood Reporter called it a "dreary, lachrymose and incredibly poky tear-jerker", but conceded that it had a built-in audience among those who put the book on the bestseller list.

== Accolades ==
Year	Award	Category	Nominee(s)	Result
1999	Stinkers Bad Movie Awards	Worst Actor	Kevin Costner	Nominated
2000	Blockbuster Entertainment Awards	Favorite Actor - Drama/Romance	Kevin Costner	Nominated
2000	Blockbuster Entertainment Awards	Favorite Actress - Drama/Romance	Robin Wright	Nominated
2000	Blockbuster Entertainment Awards	Favorite Supporting Actor - Drama/Romance	Paul Newman	Nominated
2000	Blockbuster Entertainment Awards	Favorite Supporting Actress - Drama/Romance	Illeana Douglas	Nominated
2000	Golden Raspberry Awards	Worst Actor	Kevin Costner	Nominated

== Home media ==
The film was released on VHS, LaserDisc and DVD on August 3, 1999.

== See also ==
- Message in a bottle, about the history, nature and actual examples of bottled messages
