= Nicholas Sparks =

American writer (born 1965)

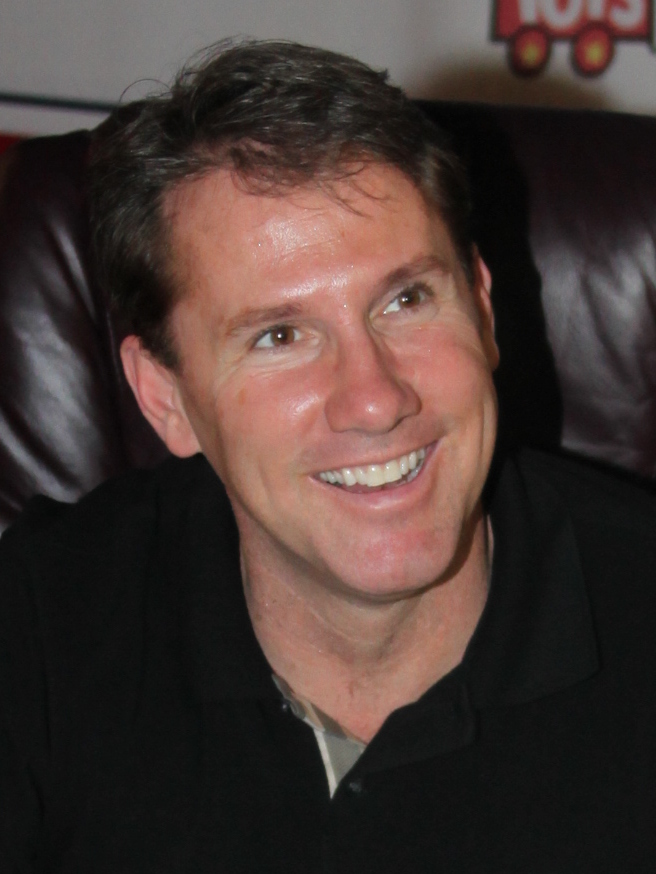
- Sparks in 2011
- Born: Nicholas Charles Sparks; December 31, 1965 (age 60); Omaha, Nebraska, U.S.
- Education: University of Notre Dame
- Occupations: Novelist; Screenwriter; Producer
- Spouse: Cathy Cote (m. 1989; div. 2015)
- Children: 5
- Writing career
- Genres: Romantic fiction; Romantic drama
- Website: nicholassparks.com

Nicholas Charles Sparks (born December 31, 1965) is an American novelist, screenwriter, and film producer. He has published 24 novels, 16 of which are New York Times bestsellers, and two works of nonfiction, with over 130 million copies sold worldwide (92 million in the U.S. alone) in more than 50 languages. Among his works are The Notebook, A Walk to Remember, and Message in a Bottle all of which, along with eight other books, have been adapted as feature films.

== Early life and education ==
Nicholas Sparks was born on December 31, 1965, in Omaha, Nebraska. His father, Patrick Michael Sparks, was a business professor and his mother, Jill Emma Marie Sparks (née Thoene), was a homemaker and an optometrist's assistant. Sparks' father was of English and Irish ancestry and his mother was of German and Czech ancestry. He was the middle of three children, with an older brother, Michael Earl "Micah" Sparks (born 1964), and a younger sister, Danielle "Dana" Sparks Lewis (1966–2000), who died at the age of 33 from a brain tumor, an event that inspired his novel A Walk to Remember. As a child, Sparks lived in Watertown, Minnesota; Inglewood, California; Playa Del Rey, California; and Grand Island, Nebraska, before the family settled in Fair Oaks, California in 1974.

In 1984, Sparks graduated valedictorian of Bella Vista High School. He began writing while attending the University of Notre Dame on a track and field scholarship, majoring in business finance and graduating magna cum laude. Sparks wrote his first, never published, novel, The Passing in 1985 and a second unpublished novel called The Royal Murders in 1989. He married Cathy Cote in 1989 and moved to New Bern, North Carolina. Before finding success as a novelist, Sparks worked in pharmaceutical sales and various other jobs, including real estate and manufacturing orthopedic products.

== Literary career ==
Sparks' first published book was Wokini: A Lakota Journey to Happiness and Self-Understanding, a nonfiction book co-written by Billy Mills about Lakota spiritual beliefs and practices, published by Feather Publishing. The book sold 50,000 copies in its first year after release.

In 1995, literary agent Theresa Park secured a $1 million advance for The Notebook from Time Warner Book Group, the book that became Sparks's breakthrough novel. Published in October 1996, the novel made The New York Times bestseller list in its first week of release and eventually spent fifty-six weeks there.

In 1998, after the publication of The Notebook, Sparks wrote Message in a Bottle which, in 1999, became the first of his novels to be adapted for film in 1999. In total, eleven of his novels have been adapted as films: Message in a Bottle (1999), A Walk to Remember (2002), The Notebook (2004), Nights in Rodanthe (2008), Dear John (2010), The Last Song (2010), The Lucky One (2012), Safe Haven (2013), The Best of Me (2014), The Longest Ride (2015), and The Choice (2016). He has also sold the screenplay adaptations of True Believer and At First Sight.

Including The Notebook, fifteen of Sparks's novels have been No. 1 New York Times Best Sellers, and all of his novels have been both New York Times and international bestsellers. Sparks has also often been listed on Forbes annual highest-paid authors lists.

In September 2020, Sparks published his twenty-first novel The Return and followed that up with The Wish in 2021 and Dreamland in 2022, each of which were optioned as films.

== Personal life ==
Sparks lives in New Bern, North Carolina. He has three sons and twin daughters. In 2015, he divorced Cathy Cote, his wife of 25 years.

=== Philanthropy ===
In 2008, Sparks donated nearly $900,000 for a new, all-weather tartan track to New Bern High School, where he has also volunteered to coach. The same year, he also donated "close to $10 million" to start a private school, The Epiphany School of Global Studies. Sparks has also funded scholarships, internships, and annual fellowships at the University of Notre Dame Creative Writing Program. In 2012, he founded The Nicholas Sparks Foundation, a nonprofit that funds global education experiences for students, which has donated more than $15 million to charities, scholarship programs, and other projects.

== Adaptations ==
11 of Sparks's books have been turned into films, four of which he produced, including The Choice, The Longest Ride, The Best of Me, and Safe Haven. Seven other of his books have also adapted for film: The Lucky One, Message in a Bottle, A Walk to Remember, Nights in Rodanthe, Dear John, The Last Song, and The Notebook. Films based on his novels have grossed $889,615,166 worldwide, while the Rotten Tomatoes scores range from 11% for The Choice to 53% for The Notebook, the most critically acclaimed film based on his work.

In April 2021, it was announced that a film adaptation of The Return was in development. Tom Dean joined the production as director, with the project developed by Bisous Pictures, and MRC Films, while MRC will serve as distributing company. Sparks will serve as a producer alongside Elizabeth Cantillon, and Theresa Park. In May of the same year, it was announced that three additional films based on novels by the author were in development for distribution by Universal Pictures. The company signed a first-look deal with Sparks, with intentions being that a long-term working relationship follow; the three movies will be joint-venture productions between Universal Pictures and Anonymous Content. The Wish will be the first book to be developed by the studio, followed by Dreamland, and an as-of-yet unspecified third adaptation. The Wish will see Sparks serve as producer, alongside Park, and Zack Hayden.

In February 2024, Sparks stated that there were at that point four of his books in development for film adaptations. The author expressed interest in adaptations for The Guardian and See Me, stating that the latter may be suited for a miniseries. In October of the same year, it was announced that a feature film adaptation of Counting Miracles was in development. Alan Ritchson is star in the leading role, in addition to serving as producer. The project will be a joint-venture production between Amazon MGM Studios, AllyCat Entertainment, Industry Entertainment, and Di Novi Pictures. Denise Di Novi, Margaret French Isaac, and Theresa Park will also serve as producers.

In January 2025, it was announced that Sparks had collaborated with M. Night Shyamalan on an original story they co-wrote, which is described as a supernatural romantic thriller. Sparks authored the novel, while Shyamalan served as screenwriter/director for the film adaptation. Jake Gyllenhaal stars in the movie, while Shyamalan produced alongside Ashwin Rajan, Theresa Park, and Marc Bienstock. Blinding Edge Pictures was the production studio, while Warner Bros. will distribute. In April 2025, it was revealed that the title of the film was Remain. According to Sparks, his manager tasked him with developing "an original story that you think will fit [Shyamalan's] audience and yours — and he's going to do the same thing." After sharing their ideas at a first meeting, Shyamalan decided to go with Sparks' story. The film is scheduled to be released on February 5, 2027.

In February 2025, it was announced that a new adaptation of A Walk to Remember was in development. The project will be a joint-venture production between Monarch Media, Di Novi Pictures, and Roserock Films; with the movie produced by Steve Barnett, Alan Powell, Vicky Patel, Denise Di Novi, Margaret French-Isaac, Hunt Lowry, and Patty Reed.

=== Film ===
Year	Title	Screenwriter	Producer	Director	Notes	Box office	RT
1999	Message in a Bottle	No	No	Luis Mandoki	Based on the novel of the same name.	$118,880,016	32%
2002	A Walk to Remember	No	No	Adam Shankman	Based on the novel of the same name.	$47,494,916	27%
2004	The Notebook	No	No	Nick Cassavetes	Based on the novel of the same name.	$115,603,229	53%
2008	Nights in Rodanthe	No	No	George C. Wolfe	Based on the novel of the same name.	$84,375,061	30%
2010	Dear John	No	No	Lasse Hallström	Based on the novel of the same name.	$114,977,104	29%
2010	The Last Song	Yes	No	Julie Anne Robinson	Based on the novel of the same name.	$89,041,656	21%
2012	The Lucky One	No	No	Scott Hicks	Based on the novel of the same name.	$99,357,138	21%
2013	Safe Haven	No	Yes	Lasse Hallström	Based on the novel of the same name.	$97,594,140	13%
2014	The Best of Me	No	Yes	Michael Hoffman	Based on the novel of the same name.	$35,926,213	12%
2015	The Longest Ride	No	Yes	George Tillman Jr.	Based on the novel of the same name.	$62,944,815	31%
2016	The Choice	No	Yes	Ross Katz	Based on the novel of the same name.	$23,420,878	11%
2026	Remain	Story	No	M. Night Shyamalan	The novel of the same name (and this film), based on an original story co-written with Shyamalan.	TBD	TBD
Total						$889,615,166	

=== TV ===
Year	Series	Credit	Director/ showrunner	Network	RT
2014	Deliverance Creek	Executive producer	Jon Amiel	Lifetime	50% (6 reviews)

== Works ==
=== Novels ===
- The Notebook series:
  1. The Notebook (October 1996) ISBN 978-0-446-52080-5
  2. The Wedding (September 2003) ISBN 978-0-446-61586-0
- Message in a Bottle (April 1998) ISBN 978-1-57042-605-6
- A Walk to Remember (October 1999) ISBN 978-0-446-52553-4
- The Rescue (September 2000) ISBN 978-0-446-52550-3
- A Bend in the Road (September 2001) ISBN 978-1-58621-177-6
- Nights in Rodanthe (September 2002) ISBN 978-1-58621-440-1
- The Guardian (April 2003) ISBN 978-1-58621-393-0
- Jeremy Marsh & Lexie Darnell series:
  1. True Believer (April 2005) ISBN 978-0-446-53243-3
  2. At First Sight (October 2005) ISBN 978-1-58621-698-6
- Dear John (October 2006) ISBN 978-0-446-52805-4
- The Choice (September 2007) ISBN 978-0-446-57992-6
- The Lucky One (September 2008) ISBN 978-0-446-57993-3
- The Last Song (September 2009) ISBN 978-1-60024-638-8
- Safe Haven (September 2010) ISBN 978-1-60788-619-8
- The Best of Me (October 2011) ISBN 978-0-446-54765-9
- The Longest Ride (September 2013) ISBN 978-1-61969-138-4
- See Me (October 2015) ISBN 978-1-61969-135-3
- Two by Two (October 2016) ISBN 978-1-4555-2069-5
- Every Breath (October 2018) ISBN 978-1-5491-9469-6
- The Return (September 2020) ISBN 978-1-5491-0221-9
- The Wish (September 2021) ISBN 978-1-5387-2862-8
- Dreamland (September 2022) ISBN 978-0593449554
- Counting Miracles (September 2024) ISBN 978-0593449592
- Remain (October 2025), Nicholas Sparks and M. Night Shyamalan. ISBN 979-8217154043

=== Nonfiction ===
- Wokini: A Lakota Journey to Happiness and Self-Understanding (1990), Nicholas Sparks and Billy Mills. ISBN 978-0-9627943-0-8
- Three Weeks with My Brother (April 2004), Nicholas Sparks and Micah Sparks. ISBN 978-1-58621-643-6
