= Dreamland (Sparks novel) =

2022 novel written by Nicholas Sparks

- Author: Nicholas Sparks
- Publication date: September 2022
- ISBN: 9780593449578

Dreamland is a novel written by Nicholas Sparks. The novel was published in September 2022 as his 23rd novel by Random House.

== Plot ==
Colby Mills wants to be a musician, and ends up meeting Morgan Lee who is a college graduate.

== Reception ==
=== Publishers Weekly ===
Publishers Weekly wrote: "Bestseller Sparks (The Wish) serves up a sentimental romance between a farmer with a tragic past and a musician with lofty ambitions."

=== The Cullman Times ===
The Cullman Times wrote: "The title of Nicholas Sparks’ newest book is a place many readers will put off visiting — at least for a night — as they spend the wee hours finishing the story in a single sitting. That’s because “Dreamland” (Random House), the author’s 23rd published novel, is unlike any he has written before."
