= Every Breath =

2018 novel by Nicholas Sparks

- Author: Nicholas Sparks
- Publication date: 2018
- ISBN: 9781538728536

Every Breath is a 2018 romance novel by American writer Nicholas Sparks.

== Plot ==
Hope Anderson is a 36-year-old trauma nurse, who was celebrating her friend's wedding at Sunset Beach, North Carolina. She was struggling due to her father getting diagnosed with ALS. On the other side, Tru Wall, a Zimbabwean 42-year-old safari guide came to the United States on a trip. One day, Tru and Hope meet, and randomly start to have a small liking to each other.

== Reception ==
Reviewers agreed that Sparks's fans would enjoy Every Breath. Deccan Herald's Chethana Dinesh found that the novel included what Sparks's fans generally expect: "Dollops of love, hope, and dreams, a tinge of sadness, and lots of tears," though they noted it as not "as impacting as his earlier novels, especially The Notebook, A Walk to Remember, Nights in Rodanthe, and Two by Two."

USA Today's Jocelyn McClurg agreed with the latter point, stating she was "already feeling a little choked up" based on the names "Tru Walls and Hope Anderson".

However, according to Publishers Weekly, the protagonists felt "cookie-cutter", though "the rich setting helps bring life to their story."

Multiple reviewers were impressed by the story's inspiration from a mailbox known as the Kindred Spirit, "where people have left their love-letters for many years for others to read and share".
