= A Walk to Remember =

2002 coming-of-age romantic drama film by Adam Shankman

- Theatrical release poster
- Directed by: Adam Shankman
- Screenplay by: Karen Janszen
- Based on: A Walk to Remember by Nicholas Sparks
- Produced by: Denise Di Novi; Hunt Lowry
- Starring: Shane West; Mandy Moore; Peter Coyote; Daryl Hannah
- Cinematography: Julio Macat
- Edited by: Emma E. Hickox
- Music by: Mervyn Warren
- Production companies: Di Novi Pictures; Gaylord Films; Pandora Cinema
- Distributed by: Warner Bros. Pictures (North America); Pandora Cinema (International)
- Release date: January 25, 2002
- Running time: 102 minutes
- Country: United States
- Language: English
- Budget: $11.8 million
- Box office: $47.5 million

A Walk to Remember is a 2002 American coming-of-age romantic drama film directed by Adam Shankman and written by Karen Janszen, based on Nicholas Sparks' 1999 novel. It stars Shane West, Mandy Moore, Peter Coyote and Daryl Hannah, and was produced by Denise Di Novi and Hunt Lowry for Warner Bros. Pictures.

The novel's 1950s setting was changed to the modern day 2000s for the film, as the producers were concerned it might not appeal to teenage audiences. This film was shot from April to May 2001 for nearly 40 days in Wilmington, North Carolina, with many of the sets borrowed from the television series Dawson's Creek. The film, like the book, is dedicated to the memory of Sparks's sister, Danielle, whose cancer-afflicted life inspired the story.

A Walk to Remember was theatrically released on January 25, 2002, and grossed $47.5 million worldwide on an $11.8 million budget. It received mixed reviews, with praise for the direction and the two leads’ performances, but criticism for its predictability. A remake of the movie was announced to be in development in March 2025.

== Plot ==
In Beaufort, North Carolina, popular and rebellious high-school senior Landon Carter and his friends leave evidence of underage drinking on school grounds and severely injure another student as the result of a prank. The principal gives him the choice of being expelled or helping the janitorial staff after school as well as tutoring fellow disadvantaged young students and finally participating in the school play. During these functions, Landon notices Jamie Sullivan, a girl he has known since kindergarten who is the local Reverend Sullivan's daughter. Since he is one of the in crowd, he has seldom paid attention to Jamie, who wears modest dresses and owns only one sweater. She makes no attempt to wear make-up or otherwise improve her looks or attract attention to herself.

Landon has trouble learning his lines for the play. Jamie, who is also in the play, agrees to help him on one condition: she warns Landon not to fall in love with her, which he dismisses as impossible. Landon and Jamie begin practicing at her house after school, and a spark of affection arises between them. However, when he blows her off in front of his friends, she decides she wants nothing to do with him. Feeling guilty, he starts taking independent initiative to tutor and to rehearse.

On the opening night of the play, Jamie astounds Landon and the audience with her beauty and voice. Onstage at the ending to the play, Jamie sings. When she finishes, Landon kisses her, which is not part of the play. Jamie continues to avoid him until he gives her a new sweater as a peace offering. Landon's spiteful ex-girlfriend, Belinda, plays a cruel prank on her by photoshopping her head onto the body of a woman in scanty, sensual attire; she and Landon's friends are shocked when Landon defends Jamie. Landon then asks Jamie out, but she says her father does not allow her to date. Landon asks her father for permission to date his daughter, which Jamie's father reluctantly allows after Landon professes his feelings for Jamie.

On their first date, Landon helps Jamie fulfill two things on her achievement wish list: being in two places at once and getting a tattoo. They then go to the docks, where Jamie tells Landon about her experience of belief being like the wind. Landon kisses Jamie and confesses his love for her. When Landon's mother discovers a private list of his aspirations, including going to medical school, he reveals that Jamie inspires him to be better. During another date, Landon asks Jamie her plans for the future. She confesses she has none, because she has leukemia and has not been responding to treatment. A desperate Landon asks for his estranged father's help in curing her but is disappointed by his reply.

After coming to terms with Jamie's condition, Landon promises to be by her side until the end. Landon's friends visit Jamie and apologize for having mistreated her. One day, Jamie collapses and ends up in the hospital, where she gives Landon a book that belonged to her mother. She states that maybe God sent Landon to her to help her through the rough times, and that Landon is her angel. Landon's father provides Jamie with private home care, relieving her family's financial burden. Landon visits his dad, tearfully thanking him for his help. They embrace and reconcile.

Landon builds a telescope for Jamie so she can see a one-time comet in the springtime, finishing it in time with help from Jamie's father. The telescope is brought to her on the balcony, and she gets a beautiful view of the comet. Landon asks her to marry him. Jamie tearfully accepts, and they get married in the church where her late mother was married. They spend the summer together, and Jamie dies as summer ends.

Four years later, Landon has finished college and been accepted into medical school. He visits Reverend Sullivan to return Jamie's mother's book. Landon apologizes, believing that Jamie did not witness a miracle (an ambition she expressed in the class yearbook). Her father disagrees, saying that she did and that her miracle was Landon.

Landon visits the docks, contemplating the idea that although Jamie is dead, she is with him. He comes to the realization that love is like the wind, which can be felt even though it cannot be seen.

== Cast ==
- Shane West as Landon Carter
- Mandy Moore as Jamie Sullivan
- Peter Coyote as Reverend Hegbert Sullivan
- Daryl Hannah as Cynthia Carter
- Lauren German as Belinda
- Clayne Crawford as Dean
- Paz de la Huerta as Tracie
- Al Thompson as Eric Hunter
- Matt Lutz as Clay Gephardt
- Erik Smith as Eddie Zimmerhoff
- Jonathan Parks Jordan as Walker
- David Lee Smith as Dr. Carter

== Production ==
=== Development ===
The inspiration for the 1999 novel A Walk to Remember was Nicholas Sparks' sister, Danielle Sparks Lewis, who died of breast cancer in 2000. In a speech he gave after her death in Berlin, the author admits that "In many ways, Jamie Sullivan was my younger sister". The plot was inspired by her life; Danielle met a man who wanted to marry her, "even when he knew she was sick, even when he knew that she might not make it". Both the book and film are dedicated to Danielle Sparks Lewis.

It was filmed in Wilmington, North Carolina in the spring of 2001, at the same time that Divine Secrets of the Ya-Ya Sisterhood (2002) and the television show Dawson's Creek were being filmed there. Many of the sets were from Dawson's Creek (1998)—particularly the school, hospital and Landon's home. The total shooting time was originally 50 days, despite Moore being able to only work 10 hours a day because she was a minor. Daryl Hannah, who wore a brown wig as her character, had received a collagen injection in her lips, which went awry and caused noticeable swelling. By the end of filming, however, the symptoms were less obvious.

=== Casting ===
Director Adam Shankman wanted the lead characters to be portrayed by young actors: "I wanted young actors with whom teenagers could connect", he said. Shankman arranged a meeting with Shane West after he saw him in a magazine. He was looking for someone who could transition from being very dark to very light. He described his choice as "an instinct" he had about West, who would appear in almost every scene and had "to be either incredibly angry and self-hating or madly in love and heroic." West said: "I don't generally read love stories, but after reading the screenplay, I knew I couldn't wait to read the book so I could truly understand Nicholas Sparks's story and how he envisioned the character of Landon. It's a beautiful story and the characters are very believable, which is what attracted me to the project.

Shankman said of Mandy Moore that she "has the voice and the face of an angel" and added that she is luminous. Moore explained that she was moved by the book: "I had such a visceral reaction to it that I remember not being able to read because I was almost hyperventilating while I was crying." Commenting on the film, she said: "It was my first movie and I know people say it may be cliché and it's a tearjerker or it's cheesy, but for me, it's the thing I'm most proud of."

== Comparisons to novel ==
While there are many similarities to the novel by Nicholas Sparks, many changes were made. On his personal website, Sparks explains the decisions behind the differences. For example, he and the producer decided to update the setting from the 1950s to the 1990s, worrying that a film set in the 50s would fail to draw teenagers. "To interest them," he writes, "we had to make the story more contemporary." To make the update believable, Landon's pranks and behavior are worse than they are in the novel; as Sparks notes, "the things that teen boys did in the 1950s to be considered a little 'rough' are different than what teen boys in the 1990s do to be considered 'rough.'"

Sparks and the producer also changed the play in which Landon and Jamie appear. In the novel, Hegbert Sullivan wrote a Christmas play that illustrated how he once struggled as a father. Due to time constraints, the sub-plot showing how he overcame his struggles could not be included in the film. Sparks was concerned that "people who hadn't read the book would question whether Hegbert was a good father", adding that "because he is a good father and we didn't want that question to linger, we changed the play."

A significant difference is that at the end of the novel, unlike the film, it is ambiguous whether Jamie died. Sparks says that he had written the book knowing she would die, yet had "grown to love Jamie Sullivan", and so opted for "the solution that best described the exact feeling I had with regard to my sister at that point: namely, that I hoped she would live."

== Soundtrack ==
The film's soundtrack was released by Moore's first label Epic Records and Sony Music Soundtrax on January 15, 2002. It features six songs by Moore and others by acts Switchfoot, Rachael Lampa and many more.

== Reception ==
=== Box office ===
A Walk to Remember grossed $41,281,092 in North America and $6,213,824 in other territories for a worldwide total of $47,494,916.

In its opening weekend, the film grossed $12,177,488, finishing third at the box office behind Black Hawk Down ($17,012,268) and Snow Dogs ($13,079,373).

=== Critical reception ===
On Rotten Tomatoes the film has an approval rating of 30% based on reviews from 105 critics, with an average rating of 4.2/10. The site's critical consensus says: "Though wholesome, the Mandy Moore vehicle A Walk to Remember is also bland and oppressively syrupy." On Metacritic the film has a weighted average score of 35 out of 100, based on 26 reviews, which indicates "generally unfavorable". Audiences surveyed by CinemaScore gave the film a grade A on scale of A to F.

Entertainment Weekly retitled the film "A Walk to Forget". Michael O'Sullivan of The Washington Post wrote: "If you can't see everything in this film coming from a mile away, then you really need to get out more." Stephanie Zacharek of Salon.com wrote: "A vehicle for teen singing sensation Mandy Moore. As vehicles go, it's an Edsel." In 2010, Time named it one of the ten worst chick flicks ever made.

Other reviews were more positive. Joe Leydon of Variety wrote: "As Carter, Shane West makes an appealingly persuasive transition from embittered cynic to earnest romantic. Moore, looking a bit like Phoebe Cates' kid sister, does a fine job of conveying Jamie's strong religious convictions as one of many admirable elements in young woman's personality. [...] As lead characters discuss their faith—or, in Carter's case, the lack thereof—actors are able to make those conversations sound perfectly natural, enabling pic to avoid any trace of overt preachiness." Chicago Sun-Times' film critic Roger Ebert praised Moore and West for their "quietly convincing" acting performances. The Chicago Reader felt that the story "has a fair amount of nuance and charm". The San Francisco Chronicle reviewer Octavio Roca found the film "entertaining" and wrote: "The picture is shamelessly manipulative, but in the best melodramatic sense." S. Williams of Momzone magazine felt that the movie was "everything a chick flick should be" and praised Shankman's direction. Us Weekly deemed it one of the 30 most romantic movies of all time. In a positive review for Christianity Today, Jeffrey Overstreet appreciated how "[t]he main character is portrayed as a Christian without being psychopathic or holier-than-thou".

== Accolades ==
Year	Ceremony	Category	Recipients	Result
2002	MTV Movie Awards	Best Breakthrough Female Performance	Mandy Moore	Won
2002	Teen Choice Awards	Choice Breakout Movie Actress	Mandy Moore	Won
2002	Teen Choice Awards	Choice Movie Chemistry	Shane West and Mandy Moore	Won
2002	Teen Choice Awards	Choice Movie Liplock	Shane West and Mandy Moore	Nominated

== Home media ==
A Walk to Remember was released by Warner Home Video on DVD on July 9, 2002. The DVD contains two commentaries, one featuring Shane West, Mandy Moore, and director Adam Shankman; the second featuring screenwriter Karen Janszen and author Nicholas Sparks. Also included is the music video for Moore's single "Cry", and the film's theatrical trailer. A "Family-Edited Version" was later released on December 24, 2002.

Shout Factory released the film on Blu-ray on December 13, 2022.

=== In other media ===
In the HBO television series Entourage, the character of Vincent Chase (Adrien Grenier) was credited as having a small supporting role in the film. In the fictional Entourage universe, Chase had an on-set relationship with Moore during the filming of A Walk to Remember.

== Remake ==
In 2022, Moore said that she would love to see a new version of A Walk to Remember and she envisions Olivia Rodrigo playing the character she had played. On March 1, 2025, Monarch Media confirmed that a remake is officially in development.

== See also ==
- Love Story (1970), a film with similar theme
