= A Bend in the Road =

2001 novel by Nicholas Sparks

- First edition
- Author: Nicholas Sparks
- Language: English
- Publisher: Warner Books
- Publication date: 2001
- Publication place: United States of America
- Pages: 341
- ISBN: 978-0-446-52778-1

A Bend in the Road is the fifth novel by the American author Nicholas Sparks, published in 2001. The story was inspired by Sparks's brother-in-law, Bob.

== Plot summary ==
Miles Ryan's life changed dramatically when his wife, Missy, was killed in a hit-and-run accident two years earlier. As a deputy sheriff in New Bern, North Carolina, he struggles with his grief, cares for their young son Jonah, and remains determined to find the driver responsible for her death. His life takes a new direction when he meets Sarah Andrews, Jonah's second-grade teacher. Having recently gone through a difficult divorce, Sarah has moved to New Bern in the hope of making a fresh start. As Miles and Sarah gradually grow closer, they begin to develop feelings for each other. However, neither of them knows that a shared secret will challenge their understanding of the past and their relationship.

== Characters ==
=== Miles Ryan ===
Miles lived in New Bern his whole life and married his high school sweetheart, Missy. The death of Missy caused Miles grief for many years especially because it was a hit-and-run accident. He felt lonely and was not happy without a partner in his life. He is a loving father that would do anything for his son Jonah. He is the deputy sheriff at New Bern. Eventually, he starts a new relationship with Sarah Andrews and they both have strong feelings for each other. After a while he returned to his obsession with his wife's case because he had some new information.

=== Jonah ===
He is a sweet seven-year-old boy who loves to spend time with his friends. Since he was really young when his mother died he does not really understand what happened. The only thing he knows is that his mom was never coming back. After his mother died he started having nightmares from which he woke up screaming and crying. The death of his mother also affected his grades at school. Other teachers let him fall behind because of what happened but Sarah decided to help him. After spending some time with Sarah he starts to like her and by the end of the novel he already viewed her as someone similar to his mom.

=== Brian ===
At the beginning of the story the killer is an unknown person. Miles was always obsessed with finding an answer so when someone told him that Otis Timson bragged about killing Missy he did not think twice and tried to arrest him. Eventually, Sarah's brother, Brian, tells her that he was the killer but explains that everything was an accident. Sarah thinks about how to tell Miles and when she finally does Miles is furious and wants to punish Brian. After hearing Brian's version of the story he went back to the crime scene and discovered that Brian's story might be true. He later followed Brian to the cemetery and made him promise that he would do something important with his life, and eventually lets him go free. Brian later became an emergency room physician and had saved six lives.

== Point of view ==
The novel is written in third person and there are some chapters in which it turns to first person and Missy's killer narrates his version of what happened.
