= Dear John (novel) =

2007 romance novel by Nicholas Sparks

- First edition
- Author: Nicholas Sparks
- Language: English
- Subject: Romance Novel, Asperger's syndrome
- Genre: Fiction
- Publisher: Warner Books
- Publication date: August 7, 2007
- Publication place: United States
- Pages: 237
- ISBN: 0446698326

Dear John is a romance novel by American writer Nicholas Sparks released in 2007. Sparks took inspiration from the real-life story of his cousin Todd Vance who served in the U.S. Armed Forces. The phrase “Dear John letter,” referring to a letter written to a man by his romantic partner to inform him that their relationship is over, was coined earlier, likely during World War II. The book made The New York Times Best Seller list in 2007.

== Plot summary ==
The story is about a couple, John Tyree and Savannah, who fall in love over the course of one summer. John and his father with Asperger's syndrome live in Wilmington, North Carolina. John's father, a single parent, has difficulty having meaningful conversation with his son and an obsession with coin collecting. John knows there is something different about him but never finds out what it is. Feeling a lack of direction and no strong fatherly influence in his life, John enlists in the U.S. Armed Forces. During his service, Savannah sends John a letter informing him of her love for another man, devastating him.

John returns home on leave from the army when he gets news of his father's death. After the return he seeks out Savannah and is surprised to learn of her life events following her marriage to another man. It is obvious to John, Savannah, and even her new husband, that Savannah still has love for John. But John decides to let Savannah go because he cares about her more than himself.

Despite being drained by battle overseas and losing Savannah, John sells his father’s coin collection to anonymously pay for the hospital bills of Savannah’s husband.

== Film adaptation ==
Dear John was adapted into a film in 2010 starring Channing Tatum as John Tyree and Amanda Seyfried as Savannah Curtis. The film was directed by Lasse Hallström and the screenplay was written by Jamie Linden.
