= The Rescue (Sparks novel) =

2000 novel by Nicholas Sparks

- First edition (publ. Warner Books)
- Author: Nicholas Sparks
- Language: English
- Publisher: Warner Books
- Publication date: 2000
- ISBN: 0-446-52550-2 (first edition)
- Dewey Decimal: 813.54
- LC Class: PS3569.P363 R4

The Rescue is a novel written by the American author Nicholas Sparks, first published in 2000. It debuted at number 2 on the New York Times Best Sellers list on October 8, 2000, and reached number 1 the following week. Sparks's son, Ryan, was the inspiration for the book.

== Main characters ==
- Denise Holton has no family, both of her parents have died. She is alone and a single mother of a child with severe learning disabilities by a former one-night stand. She was a school teacher for many years but now she doesn’t teach anymore; she spends all her time trying to teach her son how to speak. She has a part-time job as a waitress and makes just enough money to get by.
- Kyle Holton is the 4-year-old son of Denise Holton. Kyle has severe learning disabilities.
- Brett Cosgrove is Denise’s former one-night stand, leading up to Kyle’s existence. He was engaged at the time and wants nothing to do with Kyle.
- Taylor McAden—is a volunteer firefighter for the Edenton Fire Department, owns his own carpenter and contractor job. He was the person who found Denise’s son the night of her car wreck. Taylor has had problems in the past with commitment, but that all will change throughout the book.
- Judy McAden is the mother of Taylor McAden; she came to the hospital to spend time with Denise while her son was out looking for Kyle.
- Mitch Johnson is Taylor’s best friend and a volunteer firefighter for the Edenton Fire Department also. Mitch and his wife Melissa often provide Taylor with advice about his romantic life. Mitch and Melissa are the closest thing Taylor has to siblings, and Taylor is the godfather of the Johnsons' oldest son.

== Notes ==
- Sparks, Nicholas. The Rescue. New York: Warner, 2000. Print.
