= The Wedding (Sparks novel) =

2003 romantic novel by Nicholas Sparks

- First edition (publ. Warner Books)
- Author: Nicholas Sparks
- Language: English
- Publisher: Warner Books
- Publication date: 2003
- ISBN: 0-446-53245-2 (first edition)
- Dewey Decimal: 813.54
- LC Class: PS3569.P363 W43

The Wedding is a 2003 romantic novel by Nicholas Sparks. It is about a couple who celebrate 30 years' marriage, and has been described as a sequel to Sparks's previous novel The Notebook. The book follows the life of Jane, the eldest daughter of Noah and Allie, and her husband, Wilson. Under the guise of planning their daughter's wedding, Wilson sets out to "re-court" his wife in a desperate bid to save their marriage.
