= True Believer (Sparks novel) =

2005 romance novel by Nicholas Sparks

- First edition (publ. Warner Books)
- Author: Nicholas Sparks
- Language: English
- Publisher: Warner Books
- Publication date: 2005
- ISBN: 0-446-53243-6 (first edition)
- Dewey Decimal: 813.54
- LC Class: PS3569.P363 T78

True Believer is a 2005 romance novel written by American author Nicholas Sparks.

== Plot ==
Pursuing a scientific explanation for a disturbing phenomenon, Jeremy's skeptical nature is thrown off course when he meets Lexie, the town librarian. As they work together, ghostly occurrences and passionate moments converge, forcing Jeremy to realize that there are some truths science cannot explain, as he finally appreciates the pleasure of exploring the heart.
