= See Me (novel) =

2015 novel by Nicholas Sparks

- First edition
- Author: Nicholas Sparks
- Cover artist: Claire Brown Design
- Language: English
- Genre: Romance
- Publisher: Grand Central Publishing
- Publication date: October 2015
- Publication place: United States
- Media type: Print (hardcover)
- Pages: 486
- ISBN: 978-1455520619

See Me is the nineteenth novel by American novelist Nicholas Sparks. It was published on October 13, 2015, by Grand Central Publishing.

== Synopsis ==
Colin is a troubled young man with a history of anger problems that stem from his being mercilessly bullied at the various military schools he's attended throughout the years and from parents who have little interest in parenting their child. These issues lead to repeated interactions with the police, to the point where Colin's parents have had enough and throw him out of the house. Maria, on the other hand, has always grown up in a warm and nurturing environment where people have supported her emotionally throughout her law career. Maria and Colin eventually meet one another and begin dating; however, soon Maria begins to receive strange and terrifying messages from an anonymous stalker. She believes that she knows who is sending the messages, causing her to fear for her and Colin's well-being.

== Reception ==
The Washington Post panned See Me, criticizing the book's romance as "ho hum" and the reviewer stated that she "found [herself] wondering what was so mysterious about a workmanlike romance novel." The Deccan Herald was mixed, as they enjoyed the See Me's romance and thrills but felt that "Colin’s workouts and fighting encounters tend to make the book bulkier, and a tad boring."

In contrast, the Salt Lake Tribune thoroughly praised the book and wrote that "Sparks takes readers on a roller-coaster ride of emotions, from the soft tone of a love story to the adrenaline rush of a thriller."
