= Denise Di Novi =

American film producer and director

- Born: March 21, 1956 (age 70); Sherman Oaks, Los Angeles, California, U.S.
- Occupations: Film producer, director

Denise Di Novi is an American film producer and director.

== Early life ==
She is the daughter of jazz musician Gene DiNovi. When Di Novi was three years old, her family moved to Los Angeles from New York, where her father had been a Bebop jazz musician in Big Bands, as well as musical conductor for Peggy Lee, Lena Horne, Ann-Margret, and Dinah Shore. In the 70s, the family moved to Toronto, Canada. Her mother, Patricia McNeil Di Novi, was a dancer in New York City on Broadway.

== Career ==
Di Novi studied communications at Simmons College in Massachusetts, and received a degree in journalism. After working as a copy editor at the National Observer and staff writer for Canada AM, she became a reporter for Toronto's Citytv, but left to take a job as a unit publicist for Final Assignment. She became a principal in the Montreal-based production company Filmplan International, acting in various production capacities on nine major studio releases, including Scanners. In 1983, Filmplan relocated to Los Angeles and merged with Arnold Kopelson's Film Packages.

Di Novi joined New World Pictures as Executive Vice President of production. She later shifted into an overall deal as an independent producer, producing Heathers (1988) starring Winona Ryder. Di Novi then headed Tim Burton Productions and was responsible for producing several films. She set up her own production company, Di Novi Pictures, in 1992, at Columbia Pictures. She then entered into a producing deal with Turner Pictures in 1995, and then Warner Brothers Pictures in 1996 when Turner merged with Time Warner.

Di Novi has produced over 40 films. These include six from her partnership with Tim Burton: Edward Scissorhands (1990), Batman Returns (1992), The Nightmare Before Christmas (1993), Cabin Boy (1994), Ed Wood (also 1994) and James and the Giant Peach (1996). She produced four films based on books by Nicholas Sparks: Message in a Bottle (1999), A Walk to Remember (2002), Nights in Rodanthe (2008) and The Lucky One (2012).

For four years, Di Novi was executive producer of The District, a CBS primetime series created by Terry George. Di Novi made her directorial debut on the thriller Unforgettable (2017), for Warner Bros.

Most recently Di Novi completed a series for FX, The Veil, starring Elisabeth Moss, which aired in 2024.

== Filmography ==
She was a producer in all films unless otherwise noted.

=== Film ===
Year	Film	Credit
1983	Going Berserk	Associate producer
1983	For Those I Loved	Associate producer
1988	Heathers	
1990	Meet the Applegates	
1990	Edward Scissorhands	
1992	Batman Returns	
1993	The Nightmare Before Christmas	
1994	Cabin Boy	
1994	Ed Wood	
1994	Little Women	
1996	James and the Giant Peach	
1998	Almost Heroes	
1998	Practical Magic	
1999	Message in a Bottle	
2001	Happy Campers	
2001	Original Sin	
2002	A Walk to Remember	
2003	What a Girl Wants	
2004	New York Minute	
2004	Catwoman	
2005	The Sisterhood of the Traveling Pants	
2007	Lucky You	
2008	The Sisterhood of the Traveling Pants 2	
2008	Nights in Rodanthe	
2010	Ramona and Beezus	
2010	Life as We Know It	Executive producer
2011	Monte Carlo	
2011	Crazy, Stupid, Love	
2012	The Lucky One	
2014	If I Stay	Executive producer
2014	You're Not You	
2014	The Best of Me	
2015	Focus	
2015	Danny Collins	Executive producer
2017	Unforgettable	
2019	Little Women	
2022	The Sky Is Everywhere	
2026	Practical Magic 2	
TBA	The Selection	

As director

Year	Film
2017	Unforgettable

Miscellaneous crew

Year	Film	Credit
1980	The Lucky Star	Unit publicist
1980	Final Assignment	Unit publicist
1983	Videodrome	Creative consultant
1983	Of Unknown Origin	Assistant to director
1985	Fraternity Vacation	Production executive

Script and continuity department

Year	Film	Credit
1981	Gas	Script coordinator
1982	Visiting Hours	Script coordinator

Thanks

Year	Film	Credit
1995	Live Nude Girls	Special thanks
2015	The Intern	Special thanks

=== Television ===
As executive producer

Year	Title	Notes
2000	The '70s	Television film
2002	Jo	Television film
2003	Eloise at the Plaza	Television film
2003	Eloise at Christmastime	Television film
2003	Hotel	Television pilot
2000−2004	The District	Television series
2004	Sudbury	Television film
2017	Beaches	Television film
2021	Ways & Means	Television pilot
2024	The Veil	Limited series
TBA	Untitled Sarah Cooper/Cindy Chupack project	Television pilot
TBA	Teachable	Television pilot

As director

Year	Title
2017	Bones
2018	Sneaky Pete
2018	Outlander
2018	Ray Donovan

Thanks

Year	Title	Credit
2015	The Veronica Exclusive	Dedicated to
