= Message in a Bottle (novel) =

Novel by Nicholas Sparks

- First edition cover
- Author: Nicholas Sparks
- Language: English
- Genre: Romance
- Publisher: Warner Books
- Publication date: April 1, 1998
- Publication place: United States
- Media type: Print (paperback)
- Pages: 352
- ISBN: 0-446-52356-9
- OCLC: 37878680
- Dewey Decimal: 813/.54 21
- LC Class: PS3569.P363 M47 1998

Message in a Bottle is the second romance novel written by American author Nicholas Sparks. The story, which explores the romance theme of love after grief, is set in the mid-late 1990s, then-contemporary Wilmington, North Carolina. The 1999 film Message in a Bottle produced by and starring Kevin Costner, is based on this novel.

== Plot summary ==
Divorced and disillusioned about romantic relationships, Theresa Osborne is jogging when she finds a bottle on the beach. Inside is a letter of love and belonging to "Catherine," signed simply "Garrett." Challenged by the mystery and pulled by emotions she doesn't fully understand, Theresa begins a search for this man that will change her life.

Theresa discovers two other letters written by the same author and for the same recipient and goes to Wilmington to find this mysterious writer at the urging of Deanna, a close friend. It doesn't take long for her to find Garrett, the mysterious writer. Chemistry gradually grows between the two as they start dating. However, with the passage of time, the two are confronted with the reality of one of them having to change his/her life in order for them to be together. One night, the two have a confrontation about this issue that doesn't end well. Even worse, Garrett discovers his letters in Theresa's drawer. Angry at what he deemed as deception and an affair founded on lies, Garrett storms out of Theresa's apartment, taking with him his letters. Back at Wilmington, he tries to get over the issue by sharing with his father Jeb, who instead thinks Garrett mishandled the whole situation. Jeb receives a visitor that same day, a young woman whom he believes to be Theresa. Garrett and Theresa argue, with Theresa giving up the relationship citing that she could never compete with Catherine. A grieving Theresa heads back to Boston to move on with life.

A few days later, Theresa receives a surprise call comes from Jeb in Wilmington telling her to come right away. She arrives to discover Garrett has passed away during a storm while sailing in his sailboat. The heartbreak of Garrett's death confronts her in Wilmington. On that fateful day, Garrett had set sail on the Happenstance to drop one last message to Catherine, but he ran into a storm that lead to his death. Theresa has trouble getting back to her life afterward until she receives an unexpected package in the mail. Before his death, Garrett wrote a message to her in a bottle, asking for her forgiveness and offering to move to Boston for her. Theresa replies with her own letter of forgiveness which she throws off the sea affirming her love for Garrett and thanking him for having proved her that she will also get over the grief.

A film based on the novel was shot in 1999 directed by Luis Mandoki. The film stars Robin Wright as Theresa Osbourne and Kevin Costner as Garrett Blake.

(In a conference Nicholas Sparks held in a school, he said that this story was inspired by his parents.)

== Characters ==
- Theresa Osborne - main character, columnist, divorced.
- Garrett Blake - The character who writes letters in bottles.
- Catherine - Garrett's wife who died in an accident; letters are addressed to her.
- Deanna - Theresa's friend and boss, owner of beach home.
- Jeb Blake - Garrett's father.
- Kevin Osborne - Theresa and David's son.
- Brian - Deanna's husband.
- David Osborne - Theresa's ex-husband and Kevin's father.

== See also ==
- Message in a bottle, about the history, nature and actual examples of bottled messages
