= The Notebook (novel) =

1996 romantic novel by Nicholas Sparks

- Author: Nicholas Sparks
- Language: English
- Series: The Notebook and The Wedding
- Genre: Romance
- Publisher: Warner Books
- Publication date: October 1, 1996
- Publication place: United States
- Media type: Print (hardcover, paperback)
- Pages: 214
- ISBN: 0-446-52080-2
- OCLC: 34321554
- Dewey Decimal: 813/.54 20
- LC Class: PS3569.P363 N68 1996
- Followed by: Message in a Bottle

The Notebook is the debut novel by American novelist Nicholas Sparks. Released in 1996, the romance novel was later adapted into a popular 2004 film of the same name.

== Background ==
The Notebook was Nicholas Sparks' first published novel and written over a time period of six months in 1994. Literary agent Theresa Park discovered Sparks after reading the book which was in her agency's slush pile. Park offered to represent him. In October 1995, Park secured a $1 million advance for the book from the Time Warner Book Group, and the novel was published in October 1996. It was on The New York Times Best Seller list in its first week of release. The Notebook was a hardcover best seller for more than a year.

In interviews, Sparks said he was inspired to write the novel by the story of his wife's grandparents, who had been married for more than 60 years when he met them. In The Notebook, he tried to express the long romantic love of that couple.

== Plot ==
The novel opens with Noah Calhoun, an old man, reading to a woman in a nursing home. He tells her the following story:

Noah, 31, returns from World War II to his town of New Bern, North Carolina. He finishes restoring an antebellum-style house, after his father's death. Meanwhile, Allie, 29, sees the house in the newspaper and decides to pay him a visit.

They are meeting, again, after a 14-year separation, which followed their brief but passionate summer romance when her family was visiting the town. They were separated by class, as she was the daughter of a wealthy family, and he worked as a laborer in a lumberyard. Seeing each other brings on a flood of memories and strong emotions in both of them. They have dinner together and talk about their lives and the past. Allie learns that Noah had written letters to her for two years after their breakup. She realizes that her mother hid the letters so that Allie could never receive them and would conclude that Noah had forgotten about her. They talk about what could have happened between them without her mother's interference. At the end of the night, Noah invites Allie to come back the next day and promises her a surprise. She decides to see him again. During this time, her fiancé, Lon, tries to reach her at the hotel. When Allie does not respond to his calls, he begins to worry.

The next day, Noah takes Allie on a canoe ride in a small lake where swans and geese swim. She is enchanted. On their way back, they are caught in a storm and end up soaked. When they return to his house, they talk again about how important they were to each other, and how their feelings have not changed. Noah and Allie share a kiss and make love.

Allie's mother shows up the next morning and gives Allie the letters from Noah. When her mother leaves, Allie is torn and has a decision to make. She knows she loves Noah, but she does not want to hurt Lon. Noah begs her to stay with him, but she decides to leave. She cries all the way back to the hotel and starts reading the letters her mother returned to her. At the hotel, her fiancé Lon is waiting in the lobby.

The man stops reading the story at this point and implies to the audience that he is reading to his wife, who has Alzheimer's disease and does not recognize him. Throughout the story he explains he is also ill, battling a third cancer, and suffering heart disease, kidney failure, and severe arthritis in his hands.

He resumes reading the story and describing their life together: her career as a noted painter, their children, growing old together, and finally the diagnosis of Alzheimer's. He had changed the names in the story to protect her, but he is Noah and she is Allie. They walk together and Allie, although she does not recognize him, says she might feel something for him.

That night they have dinner together. Referring to the story, she can't quite remember who Allie chose. Recognizing her husband, she tells him that she loves him. They embrace and talk, but after almost four hours, Allie fades. She begins to panic and hallucinate and forgets who Noah is again. The nurses have to sedate her.

Later, Noah has a stroke and cannot visit Allie. When he recovers, he goes to visit Allie late at night, as he is staying in the same care home. When Noah tries to sneak past the nurse station, the nurse on duty states that she is going for a coffee, even though she already has one. She tells Noah she won't be back for a while and not to do anything foolish while she is away. Noah realizes this is just a ruse to let him go see Allie. He goes to Allie’s room and finds her in bed, asleep. She wakes up and recognizes him as Noah.

== Adaptations ==
In 2004, the novel was adapted into a popular film of the same name called The Notebook starring Rachel McAdams and Ryan Gosling.

A television series based on the novel is also being developed by writer Todd Graff, who will also exec produce along with Sparks and Theresa Park for the Warner Bros. Television and Nicholas Sparks Productions.

A musical adaptation of the novel opened on Broadway at the Gerald Schoenfeld Theatre on March 14, 2024. The musical, co-directed by Michael Greif and Schele Williams, features a score by Ingrid Michaelson and a book by Bekah Brunstetter. The show had a pre-Broadway run in 2022 at Chicago Shakespeare Theater.
