= Reader's Digest Select Editions =

Series of hardcover fiction anthology books

The Reader's Digest Select Editions are a series of hardcover fiction anthology books, published bi-monthly and available by subscription, from Reader's Digest. Each volume consists of four or five current bestselling novels selected by Digest editors and abridged (or "condensed") to shorter form to accommodate the anthology format.

This series is a renamed continuation of the long-running anthology series Reader's Digest Condensed Books. The two series overlapped in 1997 before fully switching to the Select Editions name. Frequently published authors in the Select series include Lee Child (19 titles), Nicholas Sparks (17 titles), Michael Connelly (13 titles), Mary Higgins Clark (12 titles) and Dick Francis (10 titles).

== Novels by volume ==
=== 1997 ===
Volume 229 - #1

- The Runaway Jury - John Grisham
- Critical Judgment - Michael Palmer
- Icon - Frederick Forsyth
- Capitol Offense - Senator Barbara Mikulski & Mary Louise Oates

Volume 230 - #2

- The Third Twin - Ken Follett
- Small Town Girl - LaVyrle Spencer
- To the Hilt - Dick Francis
- The Burning Man - Phillip Margolin

Volume 231 - #3

- A Woman's Place - Barbara Delinsky
- The Unlikely Spy - Daniel Silva
- The Cat Who Tailed a Thief - Lilian Jackson Braun
- Beyond Recognition - Ridley Pearson

Volume 232 - #4

- The Escape Artist - Diane Chamberlain
- Airframe - Michael Crichton
- Weeding Out the Tears - Jeanne White with Susan Dworkin
- Infinity's Child - Harry Stein

Volume 233 - #5

- The Partner - John Grisham
- All God's Children - Thomas Eidson
- Medusa's Child - John J. Nance
- Only Son - Kevin O'Brien

Volume 234 - #6

- Pretend You Don't See Her - Mary Higgins Clark
- The Big Picture - Douglas Kennedy
- A Place to Call Home - Deborah Smith
- Chromosome 6 - Robin Cook

=== 1998 ===
Volume 235 - #1

- Guilt - John Lescroart
- Only Love - Erich Segal
- Five Past Midnight - James Thayer
- Three Wishes - Barbara Delinsky

Volume 236 - #2

- Plum Island - Nelson DeMille
- Homecoming - Belva Plain
- 10 Lb. Penalty - Dick Francis
- The Starlite Drive-In - Marjorie Reynolds

Volume 237 - #3

- The Winner - David Baldacci
- Homeport - Nora Roberts
- Flight of Eagles - Jack Higgins
- Then Came Heaven - LaVyrle Spencer

Volume 238 - #4

- The Street Lawyer - John Grisham
- Message in a Bottle - Nicholas Sparks
- The Cobra Event - Richard Preston
- Sooner or Later - Elizabeth Adler

Volume 239 - #5

- You Belong to Me - Mary Higgins Clark
- American Dreams - John Jakes
- Toxin - Robin Cook
- Firebird - Janice Graham

Volume 240 - #6

- No Safe Place - Richard North Patterson
- Somebody's Baby - Elaine Kagan
- Riptide - Douglas Preston & Lincoln Child
- The Coffin Dancer - Jeffery Deaver

=== 1999 ===
Volume 241 - #1

- The Loop - Nicholas Evans
- "N" Is for Noose - Sue Grafton
- Coast Road - Barbara Delinsky
- The Eleventh Commandment - Jeffrey Archer

Volume 242 - #2

- Rainbow Six - Tom Clancy
- Cloud Nine - Luanne Rice
- The Simple Truth - David Baldacci
- The Cat Who Saw Stars - Lilian Jackson Braun

Volume 243 - #3

- The Hammer of Eden - Ken Follett
- Welcome to the World, Baby Girl! - Fannie Flagg
- Stonewall's Gold - Robert J. Mrazek
- River's End - Nora Roberts

Volume 244 - #4

- The Testament - John Grisham
- The Snow Falcon - Stuart Harrison
- Terminal Event - James Thayer
- Liberty Falling - Nevada Barr

Volume 245 - #5

- We'll Meet Again - Mary Higgins Clark
- The Marching Season - Daniel Silva
- Miss Julia Speaks Her Mind - Ann B. Ross
- 8.4 - Peter Hernon

Volume 246 - #6

- Lake News - Barbara Delinsky
- The Devil's Teardrop - Jeffery Deaver
- A Walk to Remember - Nicholas Sparks
- Thunderhead - Douglas Preston & Lincoln Child

=== 2000 ===
Volume 247 - #1

- Black Notice - Patricia Cornwell
- Eddie's Bastard - William Kowalski
- Boundary Waters - William Kent Krueger
- The Innocents Within - Robert Daley

Volume 248 - #2

- Follow the Stars Home - Luanne Rice
- Hunting Badger - Tony Hillerman
- The Quiet Game - Greg Iles
- Second Wind - Dick Francis

Volume 249 - #3

- Blackout - John J. Nance
- Angel Falls - Kristin Hannah
- Void Moon - Michael Connelly
- The Kingsley House - Arliss Ryan

Volume 250 - #4

- The Lion's Game - Nelson DeMille
- Handyman - Linda Nichols
- The Patient - Michael Palmer
- Round Robin - Jennifer Chiaverini

Volume 251 - #5

- Ghost Moon - Karen Robards
- The Empty Chair - Jeffery Deaver
- Hawke's Cove - Susan Wilson
- The Color of Hope - Susan Madison

Volume 252 - #6

- Before I Say Good-bye - Mary Higgins Clark
- Julie and Romeo - Jeanne Ray
- Demolition Angel - Robert Crais
- Winter Solstice - Rosamunde Pilcher

=== 2001 ===
Volume 253 - #1

- The Rescue - Nicholas Sparks
- Code to Zero - Ken Follett
- My Mother's Daughter - Judith Henry Wall
- Even Steven - John Gilstrap

Volume 254 - #2

- Running Blind - Lee Child
- Dream Country - Luanne Rice
- Shattered - Dick Francis
- A Certain Slant of Light - Cynthia Thayer

Volume 255 - #3

- The Villa - Nora Roberts
- 24 Hours - Greg Iles
- Nora, Nora - Anne Rivers Siddons
- Force 12 - James Thayer

Volume 256 - #4

- Peace Like a River - Leif Enger
- "P" Is for Peril - Sue Grafton
- Summer Island - Kristin Hannah
- The Incumbent - Brian McGrory

Volume 257 - #5

- The Ice Child - Elizabeth McGregor
- The Blue Nowhere - Jeffery Deaver
- Suzanne's Diary for Nicholas - James Patterson
- Back When We Were Grownups - Anne Tyler

Volume 258 - #6

- Summer Light - Luanne Rice
- Echo Burning - Lee Child
- The Rich Part of Life - Jim Kokoris
- On the Street Where You Live - Mary Higgins Clark

=== 2002 ===
Volume 259 - #1

- Envy - Sandra Brown
- Secret Sanction - Brian Haig
- Entering Normal - Anne D. LeClair
- A Mulligan for Bobby Jobe - Bob Cullen

Volume 260 - #2

- A Bend in the Road - Nicholas Sparks
- The Woman Next Door - Barbara Delinsky
- Jackdaws - Ken Follett
- Long Time No See - Susan Isaacs

Volume 261 - #3

- Safe Harbor - Luanne Rice
- The Analyst - John Katzenbach
- Fallen Angel - Don J. Snyder
- Open Season - C. J. Box

Volume 262 - #4

- The Stone Monkey - Jeffery Deaver
- Step-Ball-Change - Jeanne Ray
- The Smoke Jumper - Nicholas Evans
- The Wailing Wind - Tony Hillerman

Volume 263 - #5

- Daddy's Little Girl - Mary Higgins Clark
- Without Fail - Lee Child
- Flight Lessons - Patricia Gaffney
- Three Weeks in Paris - Barbara Taylor Bradford

Volume 264 - #6

- An Accidental Woman - Barbara Delinsky
- 2nd Chance - James Patterson
- Distant Shores - Kristin Hannah
- City of Bones - Michael Connelly

=== 2003 ===
Volume 265 - #1

- Chesapeake Blue - Nora Roberts
- No One to Trust - Iris Johansen
- Standing in the Rainbow - Fannie Flagg
- In the Bleak Midwinter - Julia Spencer-Fleming

Volume 266 - #2

- Hornet Flight - Ken Follett
- Leaving Eden - Ann LeClaire
- "Q" Is for Quarry - Sue Grafton
- Nights in Rodanthe - Nicholas Sparks

Volume 267 - #3

- The Last Promise - Richard Paul Evans
- Danger Zone - Shirley Palmer
- Not a Sparrow Falls - Linda Nichols
- Street Boys - Lorenzo Carcaterra

Volume 268 - #4

- Proof of Intent - William J. Coughlin & Walter Sorrells
- Eat Cake - Jeanne Ray
- The Vanished Man - Jeffery Deaver
- The Secret Hour - Luanne Rice

Volume 269 - #5

- Final Witness - Simon Tolkien
- The Guardian - Nicholas Sparks
- The Second Time Around - Mary Higgins Clark
- Between Sisters - Kristin Hannah

Volume 270 - #6

- Avenger - Frederick Forsyth
- Waterloo Station - Emily Grayson
- Flirting With Pete - Barbara Delinsky
- The Anniversary - Amy Gutman

=== 2004 ===
Volume 271 - #1

- Cold Pursuit - T. Jefferson Parker
- Temporary Sanity - Rose Connors
- The Forever Year - Ronald Anthony
- Lover's Lane - Jill Marie Landis

Volume 272 - #2

- Drifting - Stephanie Gertler
- A Perfect Day - Richard Paul Evans
- Beachcomber - Karen Robards
- Split Second - David Baldacci

Volume 273 - #3

- Summer Harbor - Susan Wilson
- The Wedding - Nicholas Sparks
- The Conspiracy Club - Jonathan Kellerman
- The Sight of the Stars - Belva Plain

Volume 274 - #4

- The Curious Incident of the Dog in the Night-Time - Mark Haddon
- The Promise of a Lie - Howard Roughan
- PS, I Love You - Cecelia Ahern
- Letter from Home - Carolyn G. Hart

Volume 275 - #5

- The Valley of Light - Terry Kay
- Killer Smile - Lisa Scottoline
- Sam's Letters to Jennifer - James Patterson
- The Zero Game - Brad Meltzer

Volume 276 - #6

- Some Danger Involved - Will Thomas
- Blood Is the Sky - Steve Hamilton
- Maximum Security - Rose Connors
- Nighttime Is My Time - Mary Higgins Clark

=== 2005 ===
Volume 277 - #1

- Three Weeks with My Brother - Nicholas Sparks and Micah Sparks
- The Things We Do for Love - Kristin Hannah
- The Murder Artist - John Case
- Night Train to Lisbon - Emily Grayson

Volume 278 - #2

- Skeleton Man - Tony Hillerman
- Whiteout - Ken Follett
- Redbird Christmas - Fannie Flagg
- The Summer I Dared - Barbara Delinsky

Volume 279 - #3

- Kill the Messenger - Tami Hoag
- A Northern Light - Jennifer Donnelly
- Murder at the B-School - Jeffrey L. Cruikshank
- The Queen of the Big Time - Adriana Trigiani

Volume 280 - #4

- Mosaic - Soheir Khashoggi
- Diving Through Clouds - Nicola Lindsay
- One Shot - Lee Child
- Bait - Karen Robards

Volume 281 - #5

- The Closers - Michael Connelly
- The Ladies of Garrison Gardens - Louise Shaffer
- Heartbreak Hotel - Jill Marie Landis
- Julie and Romeo Get Lucky - Jeanne Ray

Volume 282 - #6

- This Dame for Hire - Sandra Scoppettone
- False Testimony: A Crime Novel - Rose Connors
- No Place Like Home - Mary Higgins Clark
- Twisted - Jonathan Kellerman

=== 2006 ===
Volume 283 - #1

- The Undomestic Goddess - Sophie Kinsella
- True Believer - Nicholas Sparks
- The Double Eagle - James Twining
- One Soldier's Story: A Memoir - Bob Dole

Volume 284 - #2

- Sacred Cows - Karen E. Olson
- Lifeguard - James Patterson
- Blue Bistro - Elin Hilderbrand
- Looking for Peyton Place - Barbara Delinsky

Volume 285 - #3

- The Town That Came a Courtin' - Ronda Rich
- The Sunflower - Richard Paul Evans
- Dead Simple - Peter James
- Magic Hour - Kristin Hannah

Volume 286 - #4

- Sun at Midnight - Rosie Thomas
- Cover Your Assets - Patricia Smiley
- At First Sight - Nicholas Sparks
- False Impression - Jeffrey Archer

Volume 287 - #5

- Rosie - Alan Titchmarsh
- Two Little Girls in Blue - Mary Higgins Clark
- The Hard Way - Lee Child
- Where Mercy Flows - Karen Harter

Volume 288 - #6

- Sailing to Capri - Elizabeth Adler
- A Christmas Guest - Anne Perry
- The Conjuror's Bird - Martin Davies
- Married to a Stranger - Patricia MacDonald

=== 2007 ===
Volume 289 - #1

- The Whistling Season - Ivan Doig
- Consigned to Death - Jane K. Cleland
- Orbit - John J. Nance
- Angels Fall - Nora Roberts

Volume 290 - #2

- Angels of Morgan Hill - Donna VanLiere
- The Saddlemaker's Wife - Earlene Fowler
- Echo Park - Michael Connelly
- Under Orders - Dick Francis
- "The Glass Case" (short story) - Kristin Hannah

Volume 291 - #3

- Dear John - Nicholas Sparks
- The Two Minute Rule - Robert Crais
- Can't Wait to Get to Heaven - Fannie Flagg
- A Whole New Life - Betsy Thornton

Volume 292 - #4

- Autumn Blue - Karen Harter
- Bad Luck and Trouble - Lee Child
- Tallgrass - Sandra Dallas
- Winter's Child - Margaret Maron

Volume 293 - #5

- Shadow Dance - Julie Garwood
- Francesca's Kitchen - Peter Pezzelli
- The Sleeping Doll - Jeffery Deaver
- Garden Spells - Sarah Addison Allen

Volume 294 - #6

- No Time for Goodbye - Linwood Barclay
- Daddy's Girl - Lisa Scottoline
- Thunder Bay - William Kent Krueger
- I Heard That Song Before - Mary Higgins Clark

=== 2008 ===
Volume 295 - #1

- The Overlook - Michael Connelly
- Meet Me in Venice - Elizabeth Adler
- Step on a Crack - James Patterson & Michael Ledwidge
- An Irish Country Doctor - Patrick Taylor

Volume 296 - #2

- Bad Blood - Linda Fairstein
- The Long Walk Home - Will North
- The Blue Zone - Andrew Gross
- Iris & Ruby - Rosie Thomas
- "James Penney's New Identity" (short story) - Lee Child

Volume 297 - #3

- The Ghost - Robert Harris
- The Choice - Nicholas Sparks
- The Watchman - Robert Crais
- Her Royal Spyness - Rhys Bowen

Volume 298 - #4

- Blue Heaven - C. J. Box
- The First Patient - Michael Palmer
- The Sugar Queen - Sarah Addison Allen
- Dead Heat - Dick Francis & Felix Francis

Volume 299 - #5

- Sundays at Tiffany's - James Patterson & Gabrielle Charbonnet
- Lady Killer - Lisa Scottoline
- The Christmas Promise - Donna VanLiere
- Final Theory - Mark Alpert

Volume 300 - #6

- Where Are You Now? - Mary Higgins Clark
- A Single Thread - Marie Bostwick
- An Irish Country Village - Patrick Taylor
- Italian Lessons - Peter Pezzelli

=== 2009 ===
Volume 301 - #1

- Nothing to Lose - Lee Child
- Remember Me? - Sophie Kinsella
- Don't Tell a Soul - David Rosenfelt
- Leaving Jack - Gareth Crocker

Volume 302 - #2

- The Brass Verdict - Michael Connelly
- Crossroads - Belva Plain
- Guilty - Karen Robards
- Hannah's Dream - Diane Hammond

Volume 303 - #3

- The Lucky One - Nicholas Sparks
- A Foreign Affair - Caro Peacock
- Envy the Night - Michael Koryta
- The Last Lecture - Randy Pausch with Jeffrey Zaslow

Volume 304 - #4

- Silks - Dick Francis and Felix Francis
- Very Valentine - Adriana Trigiani
- Chasing Darkness - Robert Crais
- Water, Stone, Heart - Will North

Volume 305 - #5

- Still Life - Joy Fielding
- Grace - Richard Paul Evans
- Hell Bent - William G. Tapply
- Prayers for Sale - Sandra Dallas

Volume 306 - #6

- Love in Bloom - Sheila Roberts
- Pursuit - Karen Robards
- Serendipity - Louise Shaffer
- The Nine Lessons - Kevin Alan Milne

=== 2010 ===
Volume 307 - #1

- Gone Tomorrow - Lee Child
- Lost & Found - Jacqueline Sheehan
- The Murder of Tut - James Patterson and Michael Dugard
- La's Orchestra Saves the World - Alexander McCall Smith

Volume 308 - #2

- The Scarecrow - Michael Connelly
- The French Gardener - Santa Montefiore
- Heaven's Keep - William Kent Krueger
- The Art of Racing in the Rain - Garth Stein

Volume 309 - #3

- Winter Garden - Kristin Hannah
- The Poacher's Son - Paul Doiron
- A Thread So Thin - Marie Bostwick
- Half Broke Horses - Jeannette Walls

Volume 310 - #4

- Villa Mirabella - Peter Pezzelli
- Rainwater - Sandra Brown
- The First Rule - Robert Crais
- The Girl Who Chased the Moon - Sarah Addison Allen

Volume 311 - #5

- The Christmas List - Richard Paul Evans
- From Cradle to Grave - Patricia MacDonald
- Spinning Forward - Terri DuLong
- Blood Lines - Kathryn Casey

Volume 312 - #6

- The Mountain Between Us - Charles Martin
- Nine Dragons - Michael Connelly
- A Dog's Purpose - W. Bruce Cameron
- This Time Together - Carol Burnett

=== 2011 ===
Volume 313 - #1

- 61 Hours - Lee Child
- Small Change - Sheila Roberts
- Nowhere to Run - C. J. Box
- Leaving Unknown - Kerry Reichs

Volume 314 - #2

- Crossfire - Dick Francis and Felix Francis
- Sweet Misfortune - Kevin Alan Milne
- Outwitting Trolls - William G. Tapply
- Letters from Home - Kristina McMorris

Volume 315 - #3

- Safe Haven - Nicholas Sparks
- The Sentry - Robert Crais
- An Irish Country Courtship - Patrick Taylor
- The Provence Cure for the Brokenhearted - Bridget Asher

Volume 316 - #4

- Never Look Away - Linwood Barclay
- Promise Me - Richard Paul Evans
- Lipstick in Afghanistan - Roberta Gately
- I Still Dream About You - Fannie Flagg

Volume 317 - #5

- Now You See Her - Joy Fielding
- The Peach Keeper - Sarah Addison Allen
- Buried Secrets - Joseph Finder
- The Oracle of Stamboul - Michael David Lukas

Volume 318 - #6

- The Orchard - Jeffrey Stepakoff
- Worth Dying For - Lee Child
- How to Bake a Perfect Life - Barbara O'Neal
- On Borrowed Time - David Rosenfelt

=== 2012 ===
Volume 319 - #1

- One Summer - David Baldacci
- Cast Into Doubt - Patricia MacDonald
- Casting About - Terri DuLong
- The Lion - Nelson DeMille

Volume 320 - #2

- The Final Note - Kevin Alan Milne
- Dick Francis Gamble - Felix Francis
- The Orchard - Theresa Weir
- Lethal - Sandra Brown

Volume 321 - #3

- A Dublin Student Doctor - Patrick Taylor
- The Underside of Joy - Sere Prince Halverson
- Three-Day Town - Margaret Maron
- Emory's Gift - W. Bruce Cameron

Volume 322 - #4

- The Bungalow - Sarah Jio
- The Drop - Michael Connelly
- The Best of Me - Nicholas Sparks
- Love in a Nutshell - Janet Evanovich and Dorien Kelly

Volume 323 - #5

- Home Front - Kristin Hannah
- I've Got Your Number - Sophie Kinsella
- The House of Silk - Anthony Horowitz
- The Christmas Note - Donna VanLiere

Volume 324 - #6

- Oath of Office - Michael Palmer
- Thunder and Rain - Charles Martin
- Ice Fire - David Lyons
- Saving Ceecee Honeycutt - Beth Hoffman

=== 2013 ===
Volume 325 - #1

- Lost December - Richard Paul Evans
- XO - Jeffery Deaver
- Beach House Memories - Mary Alice Monroe
- Missing Child - Patricia MacDonald

Volume 326 - #2

- The Innocent - David Baldacci
- Beach Colors - Shelley Noble
- The Third Gate - Lincoln Child
- Calling Invisible Women - Jeanne Ray

Volume 327 - #3

- Bloodline - Dick Francis
- The View from Here - Cindy Myers
- A Wanted Man - Lee Child
- Miss Dreamsville - Amy Hill Hearth

Volume 328 - #4

- The One Good Thing - Kevin Alan Milne
- A Cold and Lonely Place - Sara J. Henry
- The Man Who Forgot His Wife - John O'Farrell
- Close Your Eyes - Iris Johansen and Roy Johansen

Volume 329 - #5

- The Irresistible Blueberry Bakeshop & Cafe - Mary Simses
- Blackberry Winter - Sarah Jio
- Suspect - Robert Crais
- There Was an Old Woman - Hallie Ephron

Volume 330 - #6

- The Silver Star - Jeannette Walls
- Political Suicide - Michael Palmer
- A Street Cat Named Bob - James Bowen
- Fly Away - Kristin Hannah

=== 2014 ===
Volume 331 - #1

- The Summer Girls - Mary Alice Monroe
- The Glassblower's Apprentice - Peter Pezzelli
- The Hit - David Baldacci
- The Good Dream - Donna VanLiere

Volume 332 - #2

- Unwritten - Charles Martin
- The Promise - Ann Weisgarber
- Never Go Back - Lee Child
- Stargazey Point - Shelley Noble

Volume 333 - #3

- Forever Friday - Timothy Lews
- The Rosie Project - Graeme Simsion
- Deadline - Sandra Brown
- Melody of Secrets - Jeffrey Stepakoff

Volume 334 - #4

- Doing Harm - Kelly Parsons
- Lost Lake - Sarah Addison Allen
- Sisters - Patricia MacDonald
- The Longest Ride - Nicholas Sparks

Volume 335 - #5

- Goodnight June - Sarah Jio
- Those Who Wish Me Dead - Michael Koryta
- Looking for Me - Beth Hoffman
- The Girl with a Clock for a Heart - Peter Swanson

Volume 336 - #6

- Suspicion - Joseph Finder
- Dog Gone, Back Soon - Nick Trout
- The Wishing Thread - Lisa Van Allen
- Without Warning - David Rosenfelt

=== 2015 ===
Volume 337 - #1

- Invisible - James Patterson and David Ellis
- The Glass Kitchen - Linda Francis Lee
- Invisible City - Julia Dahl
- Journey from Darkness - Garreth Crocker

Volume 338 - #2

- Personal - Lee Child
- You Knew Me When - Emily Liebert
- The Monogram Murders - Sophie Hannah
- Star Gazing - Linda Gillard

Volume 339 - #3

- Girl Underwater - Claire Kells
- Never Come Back - David Bell
- A Life Intercepted - Charles Martin
- Mean Streak - Sandra Brown

Volume 340 - #4

- The Story of Us - Dani Atkins
- Windigo Island - William Kent Krueger
- The Mistletoe Promise - Richard Paul Evans
- Resistant - Michael Palmer

Volume 341 - #5

- The Burning Room - Michael Connelly
- First Frost - Sarah Addison Allen
- The Silent Sister - Diane Chamberlain
- Lawyer for the Dog - Lee Robinson

Volume 342 - #6

- Memory Man - David Baldacci
- Eight Hundred Grapes - Laura Dave
- Moriarty - Anthony Horowitz
- The Christmas Light - Donna VanLiere

=== 2016 ===
Volume 343 - #1

- The Bullet - Mary Louise Kelly
- The Cherry Harvest - Lucy Sanna
- One Mile Under - Andrew Gross
- Miss Dreamsville and the Lost Heiress of Collier County - Amy Hill Hearth

Volume 344 - #2

- Carrying Albert Home - Homer Hickam
- What Doesn't Kill Her - Carla Norton
- Love Gently Falling - Melody Carlson
- Radiant Angel - Nelson DeMille

Volume 345 - #3

- Make Me - Lee Child
- Come Hell or Highball - Maia Chance
- Summit Lake - Charlie Donlea
- The Good Neighbor - Amy Sue Nathan

Volume 346 - #4

- Front Runner - Felix Francis
- The Charm Bracelet - Viola Shipman
- The Precipice - Paul Doiron
- Not Forgetting the Whale - John Ironmonger

Volume 347 - #5

- The Crossing - Michael Connelly
- Piece of Mind - Michelle Adelman
- The Mistletoe Inn - Richard Paul Evans
- The Unexpected Inheritance of Inspector Chopra - Vaseem Khan

Volume 348 - #6

- The City Baker's Guide to Country Living - Louise Miller
- Hostage Taker - Stefanie Pintoff
- Billy and Me - Giovanna Fletcher
- Arrowood - Laura McHugh

=== 2017 ===
Volume 349 - #1

- The Rules of Love and Grammar - Mary Simses
- I Let You Go - Clare Mackintosh
- The Dollhouse - Fiona Davis
- Sit! Stay! Speak! - Annie England Noble

Volume 350 - #2

- Night School - Lee Child
- The Bookshop on the Corner - Jenny Colgan
- Among the Wicked - Linda Castillo
- One True Loves - Taylor Jenkins Reid

Volume 351 - #3

- Guilty Minds - Joseph Finder
- A Lowcountry Wedding - Mary Alice Monroe
- The Branson Beauty - Claire Booth
- The Hope Chest - Viola Shipman

Volume 352 - #4

- Burning Bright - Nicholas Petrie
- The Curious Charms of Arthur Pepper - Phaedra Patrick
- The Vanishing Year - Kate Moretti
- I'm Still Here - Clelie Avit

Volume 353 - #5

- The Wrong Side of Goodbye - Michael Connelly
- Miramar Bay - Davis Bunn
- Triple Crown - Felix Francis
- The Mistletoe Secret - Richard Paul Evans

Volume 354 - #6

- My Not So Perfect Life - Sophie Kinsella
- The Twelve Dogs of Christmas - David Rosenfelt
- Don't You Cry - Mary Kubica
- Home Sweet Home - April Smith

=== 2018 ===
Volume 355 - #1

- A Dog's Way Home - W. Bruce Cameron
- Down a Dark Road - Linda Castillo
- Virtually Perfect - Paige Roberts
- Knife Creek - Paul Doiron

Volume 356 - #2

- The Switch - Joseph Finder
- Beach House for Rent - Mary Alice Monroe
- You'll Never Know Dear - Hallie Ephron
- Before You Go - Clare Swatman

Volume 357 - #3

- The Wanted - Robert Crais
- Rise & Shine, Benedict Stone - Phaedra Patrick
- The Vanishing Season - Joanna Schaffhausen
- Talk to the Paw - Melinda Metz

Volume 358 - #4

- The Midnight Line - Lee Child
- The Address - Fiona Davis
- Another Man's Ground - Claire Booth
- And All the Phases of the Moon - Judy Reene Singer

Volume 359 - #5

- Two Kinds of Truth - Michael Connelly
- The Noel Diary - Richard Paul Evans
- Sulfur Springs - William Kent Krueger
- Dreaming in Chocolate - Susan Bishop Crispell

Volume 360 - #6

- The Bad Daughter - Joy Fielding
- The Recipe Box - Viola Shipman
- The First Family - Michael and Daniel Palmer
- Collared - David Rosenfelt

Volume 361 - #7

- The Disappeared - C. J. Box
- Dear Mrs. Bird - A. J. Pearce
- The Echo Killing - Christi Daugherty
- Between You and Me - Susan Wiggs

Volume 362 - #8

- Stay Hidden - Paul Doiron
- The Late Bloomers Club - Louise Miller
- The Girl in the Woods - Patricia MacDonald
- The Light Over London - Julia Kelly

=== 2019 ===
Volume 363 - #1

- Don't Believe It - Charlie Donlea
- Rainy Day Friends - Jill Shalvis
- By His Own Hand - Neal Griffin
- When the Men Were Gone - Marjorie Herrera Lewis

Volume 364 - #2

- The Last Time I Lied - Riley Sager
- A Borrowing of Bones - Paula Munier
- Not Our Kind - Kitty Zeldis
- A Gathering of Secrets - Linda Castillo

Volume 365 - #3

- Past Tense - Lee Child
- Hope on the Inside - Marie Bostwick
- Forever and a Day - Anthony Horowitz
- The Last Road Trip - Gareth Crocker

Volume 366 - #4

- Judgment - Joseph Finder
- The Military Wife - Laura Trentham
- Desolation Mountain - William Kent Krueger
- An Anonymous Girl - Greer Hendricks and Sarah Pekkanen

Volume 367 - #5

- Long Road to Mercy - David Baldacci
- The Lieutenant's Nurse - Sarah Ackerman
- Things You Save in a Fire - Katherine Center
- The Noel Stranger - Richard Paul Evans

Volume 368 – #6

- Dark Site – Patrick Lee
- Dating By The Book – Mary Ann Marlowe
- Wolf Pack – C. J. Fox
- Deck The Hounds – David Rosenfelt

=== 2020 ===
Volume 369 - #1 - December 2019

- A Dangerous Man – Robert Crais
- The Book Charmer – Karen Hawkins
- A Beautiful Corpse – Christy Daugherty
- Drawing Home – Jamie Brenner

Volume 370 – #2 - February 2020

- The Turn of the Key – Ruth Ware
- A Beach Wish – Shelly Noble
- Layover – David Bell
- A Deadly Turn – Claire Booth

Volume 371 – #3 - April 2020

- Wherever She Goes – Kelley Armstrong
- The Fifth Column – Andrew Gross
- Thin Ice – Paige Shelton
- The Me I Use To Be – Jennifer Ryan

Volume 372 - #4 - June 2020

- Lock Every Door – Riley Sager
- Shamed – Linda Castillo
- The Whispers of War – Julia Kelly
- Careful What You Wish For – Hallie Ephron

Volume 373 - #5 - August 2020

- House on Fire – Joseph Finder
- An Everyday Hero – Laura Trentham
- Blind Search – Paula Munier
- Let it Snow – Nancy Thayer

Volume 374 - #6 - September 2020

- The Wild One – Nick Petrie
- Dachshund Through the Snow – David Rosenfelt
- No Bad Deed – Heather Chavez
- Noel Street – Richard Paul Evans

Volume 375 - #7 - November 2020

- Long Range – C. J. Box
- What You Wish For – Katherine Center
- The New Husband – D. J. Palmer
- The Heirloom Garden – Viola Shipman

=== 2021 ===
Volume 376 - #1 - January 2021

- Revolver Road – Christi Daugherty
- The Big Finish – Brooke Fossey
- Murder in Chianti – Camilla Trinchieri
- The Second Chance Boutique – Louisa Leaman

Volume 377 - #2 - March 2021

- The Last Flight – Julie Clark
- Of Mutts and Men – Spencer Quinn
- Beachside Beginnings – Sheila Roberts
- The Fate of a Flapper – Susanna Calkins

Volume 378 - #3 - May 2021

- The Sentinel – Lee Child and Andrew Child
- Maggie Finds Her Muse – Dee Ernst
- Outsider – Linda Castillo
- Love At First – Kate Clayborn

Volume 379 - #4 - June 2021

- To Tell You the Truth – Gilly Macmillan
- Twice Shy – Sarah Hogle
- Every Last Fear – Alex Finlay
- Fortune Favors the Dead – Stephen Spotswood

Volume 380 - #5 - August 2021

- The Breaker – Nick Petrie
- The Last Thing He Told Me – Laura Dave
- The Secrets of Love Story Bridge – Phaedra Patrick
- Silent Bite – David Rosenfelt

Volume 381 - #6 - September 2021

- Cold Wind – Paige Shelton
- The Second Life of Mirielle West – Amanda Skenandore
- Runner – Tracy Clark
- The Noel Letters – Richard Paul Evans

Volume 382 - #7 - November 2021

- Dark Sky – C. J. Box
- A Peculiar Combination – Ashley Weaver
- Meet Me in Paradise – Libby Hubscher
- Her Three Lives – Cate Holahan

=== 2022 ===
Volume 383 - #1 - January 2022

- Lightning Strike – William Kent Krueger
- Arsenic and Adobo – Mia P. Manansala
- The Last Chance Library – Freya Sampson
- A Deadly Twist – Jeffrey Siger

Volume 384 - #2 - March 2022

- Fallen – Linda Castillo
- Yours Cheerfully – AJ Pearce
- Dead by Dawn – Paul Doiron
- A Spot of Trouble – Teri Wilson

Volume 385 - #3 - May 2022

- 2 Sisters Detective Agency – James Patterson and Candice Fox
- The Lost and Found Necklace – Louisa Leaman
- Girl in Ice – Erica Ferencik
- The Family You Make – Jill Shalvis

Volume 386 - #4 - June 2022

- The Golden Couple – Greer Hendricks and Sarah Pekkanen
- Love, Lists, and Fancy Ships – Sarah Grunder Ruiz
- The Mad Girls of New York – Maya Rodale
- A Fire in the Night – Christopher Swann

Volume 387 - #5 - August 2022

- The Night Shift – Alex Finlay
- The Secret of Snow – Viola Shipman
- The Maid – Nita Prose
- This Golden State – Marit Weisenberg

Volume 388 - #6 - September 2022

- Vanishing Edge – Claire Kells
- The Bodyguard – Katherine Center
- The Matchmaker – Paul Vidich
- Best in Snow – David Rosenfelt

Volume 389 - #7 - November 2022

- Take Your Breath Away – Linwood Barclay
- The Key to Deceit – Ashley Weaver
- The Unsinkable Gretta James – Jennifer E. Smith
- Lucy Checks In – Dee Ernst

=== 2023 ===
Volume 390 - #1 - January 2023

- Fox Creek – William Kent Krueger
- Nora Goes Off Script – Annabel Monaghan
- Last Call at the Nightingale – Katharine Schellman
- Other Birds – Sarah Addison Allen

Volume 391 - #2 - March 2023

- Hatchet Island – Paul Doiron
- Bark to the Future – Spencer Quinn
- The Hidden One – Linda Castillo
- One Last Chance – Jeffrey Siger

Volume 392 - #3 - May 2023

- Racing the Light – Robert Crais
- Love in the Time of Serial Killers – Alicia Thompson
- Deep Water – Emma Bamford
- A Line in the Sand – Teri Wilson

Volume 393 - #4 - June 2023

- Treasure State – C. J. Box
- Lucy on the Wild Side – Kerry Rea
- Last To Vanish – Megan Miranda
- Alias Emma – Ava Glass

Volume 394 - #5 - July 2023

- The Rescue – T. Jefferson Parker
- The While Lady – Jacqueline Winspear
- Winter's End – Paige Shelton
- When in Rome – Sarah Adams

Volume 395 - #6 - September 2023

- The Hunter – Jennifer Herrera
- Hello Stranger – Katherine Center
- Play the Fool – Lina Chern
- The Last Lifeboat – Hazel Gaynor

Volume 396 - #7 - November 2023

- An Honest Man – Michael Koryta
- Playing it Safe – Ashley Weaver
- A Good Family – Matt Goldman
- The Wishing Game – Meg Shaffer

=== 2024 ===
Volume 397 - #1 - January 2024

- The Lie Maker – Linwood Barclay
- An Evil Heart – Linda Castillo
- Same Time Next Summer – Annabel Monaghan
- Flop Dead Gorgeous – David Rosenfelt
