= Meaconing =

Electronic countermeasure

Meaconing is the interception and rebroadcast of navigation signals. These signals are rebroadcast on the received frequency, typically with power higher than the original signal, to confuse enemy navigation. Consequently, aircraft or ground stations are given inaccurate bearings.

Meaconing is more of a concern to personnel in navigation ratings than to radio operators. However, communications transmitters are often used to transmit navigation signals. Since communications personnel operate the transmitters, they must know how to deal with any communications problems resulting from meaconing.

Successful meaconing can cause aircraft to be lured into "hot" (ambush-ready) landing zones or enemy airspace, ships to be diverted from their intended routes, bombers to expend ordnance on false targets, or ground stations to receive inaccurate bearings or position locations.

The term 'meacon' is a portmanteau of masking beacon.

== Alleged cases of meaconing ==
Iran says it used this technique (among others) to capture a USAF RQ-170 Sentinel drone, causing it to crash land. Meaconing in this case could provide a drone with false altitude measurements, causing a crash landing.

== Acronym ==
- MIJI (Meaconing, Intrusion, Jamming, and Interference)

== In popular culture ==
In the film Tomorrow Never Dies, a military GPS signal is meaconed to send a Royal Navy frigate off course.

In the novel and miniseries of the John J. Nance novel Pandora's Clock, an attempt to warn the airliner about an impending attack is summarily dismissed as an attempt at meaconing.

The villain of Die Hard 2 changes the Dulles Airport's ATC beacon altitude to below ground level, causing planes' altimeters to provide false readings, thus causing landing planes to crash.

In the video game Black (video game), the player can destroy "evidence of cell phone meaconing" in the third level of the game.

== See also ==
- Radio jamming
- Interference (communication)
- List of World War II electronic warfare equipment
