= James Thayer =

James Thayer may refer to:

- James Thayer (author) (born 1949), American author
- James Thayer (Medal of Honor) (1853–1886), United States Navy sailor and Medal of Honor recipient
- James Bradley Thayer (1831–1902), American legal writer and scholar
- James B. Thayer (1922–2018), brigadier general in the U.S. Army
