= Free Fire =

Free Fire may refer to:

- Free Fire (film), a 2016 British action comedy film
- Free Fire (video game), a 2017 multiplayer online battle royale game
- Free Fire, a 2007 Joe Pickett novel by C. J. Box

== Other uses ==
- Free-fire zone, an area into which any weapon system may fire without additional coordination
