= Philip R. Craig =

American novelist (1933–2007)

- Born: December 10, 1933; Santa Monica, California
- Died: May 8, 2007 (aged 73)
- Occupation: Mystery writer
- Writing career
- Period: 1969–2007
- Genre: Mystery
- Website: www.philiprcraig.com

Philip R. Craig (December 10, 1933 – May 8, 2007) was a writer known for his Martha's Vineyard mysteries.

== Early life and education ==
In 1933, Craig was born in Santa Monica, California. However, he raised on a cattle ranch near Durango, Colarado.

In 1951, he entered Boston University intending to become a minister. He earned a degree in 1957. While at BU, he studied poetry with Robert Lowell, who quickly persuaded him that he had no future in that field, and turned to studying prose with Gerald Warner Brace, who encouraged him to write fiction.

During this era, he was invited to join the Olympic fencing squad, but had to decline due to a knee injury.

== Career ==
From 1962 to 1965, Craig taught English and Journalism at Endicott College in Beverly, Massachusetts. He then taught at Wheelock College in Boston until 1999, at which point he retired to become a full-time writer.

His first novel, Gate of Ivory, Gate of Horn, was published in 1969, and is not a part of any series. His second and subsequent novels have all been a part of the J.W. Jackson series, all of which are set on Martha's Vineyard.

== Personal life ==
Craig died May 8, 2007 after a brief fight with cancer. He is survived by his wife Shirley and their two children: Kimberlie and James. In addition, he is survived by five grandchildren.

== Bibliography ==
=== J.W. Jackson series ===
- A Beautiful Place To Die (1989)
- The Woman Who Walked Into the Sea (1991, also published as Death in Vineyard Waters)
- The Double Minded Men (1992, also published as Vineyard Deceit)
- Cliff Hanger (1993, also published as Vineyard Fear)
- Off Season (1994)
- A Case of Vineyard Poison (1995)
- Death On a Vineyard Beach (1996)
- A Deadly Vineyard Holiday (1997)
- A Shoot on Martha's Vineyard (1998)
- A Fatal Vineyard Season (1999)
- Vineyard Blues (2000)
- Vineyard Shadows (2001)
- Vineyard Enigma (2002)
- A Vineyard Killing (2003)
- Murder at a Vineyard Mansion (2004)
- Vineyard Prey (2005)
- Dead in Vineyard Sand (2006)
- Vineyard Stalker (2007) - published posthumously
- Vineyard Chill (2008) - published posthumously

=== J.W. Jackson and Brady Coyne series ===
- First Light, co-written with William G. Tapply (2001)
- Second Sight, co-written with William G. Tapply (2005)
- Third Strike, co-written with William G. Tapply (2007) - published posthumously

=== Other books ===
- Gate of Ivory, Gate of Horn (1969)
- Delish: The J. W. Jackson Recipes, co-written with Shirley Prada Craig (2006)
