= Those Who Wish Me Dead =

2021 film by Taylor Sheridan

- Release poster
- Directed by: Taylor Sheridan
- Screenplay by: Michael Koryta; Charles Leavitt; Taylor Sheridan
- Based on: Those Who Wish Me Dead by Michael Koryta
- Produced by: Steven Zaillian; Garrett Basch; Aaron L. Gilbert; Kevin Turen; Taylor Sheridan
- Starring: Angelina Jolie; Finn Little; Nicholas Hoult; Aidan Gillen; Medina Senghore; Jon Bernthal
- Cinematography: Ben Richardson
- Edited by: Chad Galster
- Music by: Brian Tyler
- Production companies: New Line Cinema; Bron Studios; Film Rites; Bosque Ranch Productions
- Distributed by: Warner Bros. Pictures
- Release dates: May 5, 2021 (Seoul); May 14, 2021 (United States)
- Running time: 100 minutes
- Country: United States
- Language: English
- Box office: $19.1 million

Those Who Wish Me Dead is a 2021 American action thriller film directed by Taylor Sheridan with a screenplay by Michael Koryta, Charles Leavitt, and Sheridan, based on Koryta's novel of the same name. The film follows a boy (Finn Little) who witnesses the murder of his father and goes on the run with a smokejumper (Angelina Jolie) in the Montana wilderness to escape a pair of assassins (Nicholas Hoult and Aidan Gillen) hired to kill him. Jon Bernthal, Medina Senghore, and Jake Weber also appear.

Those Who Wish Me Dead premiered on May 5, 2021, in South Korea, and was released in the United States on May 14 by Warner Bros. Pictures under the New Line Cinema banner, both in theaters and digitally for one month on HBO Max. The film received mixed reviews from critics and grossed $19 million worldwide.

== Plot ==
Hannah Faber, a smokejumper, is struggling after failing to prevent the deaths of three young campers and a fellow smokejumper in a forest fire. She is now posted in a fire lookout tower in Park County, Montana.

Owen Casserly, a forensic accountant in Jacksonville, Florida, learns about the death of his district attorney boss and his family in an apparent gas explosion; believing that their deaths were actually a contracted killing and that he is the next target, Owen goes on the run with his son, Connor. He intends to seek refuge with his brother-in-law, Ethan Sawyer, a deputy sheriff in Park County.

Reaching Montana, they are ambushed by the assassins "Jack" and "Patrick", who force them off the road and down a cliff. Trapped in the car, Owen gives Connor the evidence against the assassins' employer. He flees before the assassins kill Owen.

Lightning strikes Hannah's tower, frying her communications equipment. As Ethan discovers Owen's car wreck, Hannah stumbles upon Connor while out on patrol. She takes him back to the tower to contact help.

The assassins meet their boss, who instructs them to hunt down and kill Connor. As a diversion to preoccupy the police, they use flares to start a forest fire. They go to Ethan's isolated house searching for Connor and find and interrogate Ethan's pregnant wife, Allison. When they force her to call Ethan, she gives him a duress code, then fights off the assassins and escapes.

Hannah attempts to take Connor into town on foot but they are forced to turn back when the fire blocks their path. Following the radio call, Ethan returns home with the sheriff, aiming to protect Allison. However, the assassins ambush them, killing the sheriff and forcing Ethan to guide them through the woods.

The assassins arrive at Hannah's fire tower and force Ethan to search it as they observe from afar. Hannah and Connor hide while Ethan attempts to make it appear as if the tower is empty. When Patrick realizes Ethan is talking to someone, the assassins shoot up the tower. Ethan is injured, but Hannah and Connor manage to escape.

The assassins try to follow them but are stopped by Allison who, having tracked them down, starts shooting at them. Patrick and Jack split up, with Patrick pursuing Hannah and Connor while Jack stays behind to fight Allison. Allison gains the upper hand and kills Jack.

Connor runs ahead while Hannah fights Patrick but returns after Patrick threatens to beat her to death. As Patrick is about to kill Connor, Hannah severely injures Patrick with a climbing axe and leaves him to burn to death in the approaching fire. Allison reunites with Ethan in the tower, but the fire traps them as they put on oxygen masks and hold each other. Hannah and Connor jump into a stream and watch from under the water as the fire engulfs the forest.

In the morning after the fire has burned out, Hannah's old smoke-jumping team arrives and rescues her, Connor, and Allison but Ethan dies from his gunshot wounds. Connor later prepares to give his father's evidence to the media. Hannah promises to help him through his uncertain future.

== Cast ==
- Angelina Jolie as Hannah
- Finn Little as Connor
- Jon Bernthal as Ethan
- Aidan Gillen as Jack
- Nicholas Hoult as Patrick
- Jake Weber as Owen
- Medina Senghore as Allison
- Tyler Perry as Arthur
- Boots Southerland as Sheriff
- Tory Kittles as Ryan
- James Jordan as Ben

== Production ==
The film was initially acquired by 20th Century Fox in 2013, a couple months before the novel was published. Charles Leavitt was picked after several writers had submitted their own drafts.

It was announced in January 2019 that Angelina Jolie would star in the film, with Taylor Sheridan writing and directing. By April, Nicholas Hoult, Tyler Perry, Jon Bernthal, and Aidan Gillen had been cast. Filming began in May 2019 in New Mexico, with production concluding in July 2019 and an announcement that James Jordan had been cast. The film's score was composed by Brian Tyler.

== Release ==
In May 2019, New Line Cinema acquired distribution rights to the film. The film had a theatrical debut internationally in South Korea on May 5, 2021. In the United States, it was released on May 14, 2021. As part of its plans for all of its 2021 films, Warner Bros. streamed the film simultaneously on the HBO Max service for a period of one month, after which it was removed until the home media release. According to Samba TV, the film was streamed in 1.2 million households over its first three days of digital release. By the end of its first month, the film had been watched in over 3 million U.S. households.

== Reception ==
=== Box office ===
Those Who Wish Me Dead grossed $7.4 million in the United States and Canada, and $11.7 million in other territories, for a worldwide total of $19.1 million.

In the United States, the film was released alongside Spiral, Profile, and Finding You, and was projected to gross $4–5 million from 3,188 theaters in its opening weekend. The film made $880,000 on its first day and went on to debut to $2.8 million, finishing third at the box office. The audience was evenly split between males and females, with 81% being over the age of 25. It was the second-worst opening of all time by a film playing in over 3,000 theaters. In its second weekend the film dropped 35% to $1.8 million.

Outside the U.S. the film made $2.8 million from 33 countries in its second weekend, including opening in first in Australia ($981,000 from 249 screens, and grossing $410,000 in Russia (from 904 screens), for a running international total of $4.3 million.

=== Critical response ===
On the review aggregator website Rotten Tomatoes, 63% of 224 critic reviews are positive, with an average rating of 5.7/10. The site's critical consensus reads, "A squarely traditional '90s-style action thriller, Those Who Wish Me Dead is elevated by Taylor Sheridan's propulsive direction." Metacritic, which uses a weighted average, assigned the film a score of 59 out of 100, based on 41 critics, indicating "mixed or average" reviews. Audiences polled by CinemaScore gave the film an average grade of "B" on an A+ to F scale, while PostTrak reported 72% of audience members gave it a positive score, with 44% saying they would definitely recommend it.

Writing for Variety, Peter Debruge said: "As directed by Taylor Sheridan, Those Who Wish Me Dead offers a much bigger sandbox for the gifted actor-turned-action maven, whose scripts for Sicario and Hell or High Water have launched him to the front of a genre dominated by CG robots, superheroes and other [intellectual property] once associated with Saturday morning cartoons. Such movies are plenty popular, but this one marks a welcome departure – one intended for grown-ups seeking more 'realistic' diversion – without shortchanging audiences when it comes to either spectacle or sound." Alonso Duralde of TheWrap wrote: "The stakes are high and the danger is always imminent in this straightforward thriller; it never bends the rules of the genre, but it certainly delivers on what it promises."

Film critic Sheila O'Malley from RogerEbert.com praises the "effective action sequences", notably those that show the speed of a spreading forest fire, but she says "more could be made of ...the smoke jumpers' special capabilities and skills". She says the "film leaps around so much, working to incorporate multiple narratives, including a massive forest fire, and tossing it all together inhibits the kind of emotions a film like...[this] requires"; she concludes that "it's a film with no real center."

Reviewer Peter Bradshaw from The Guardian praised the performances of Gillen and Hoult as the villains, stating that "almost everyone in the film is in danger of being upstaged" by the pair. Bradshaw says Gillen's "malign little smile" is able to "convey evil with great economy" and the "jaded older man's attitude works interestingly alongside Hoult's boyish, open demeanour." Bradshaw notes some "plot oddities", such as the illogical depiction of the assassins starting a forest fire as a diversion to local police. Overall, Bradshaw calls it a "fierce, muscular piece of work, not a million miles from something like the Coens' No Country for Old Men.
