= Arliss Ryan =

American novelist

- Born: July 24, 1950 (age 76); Detroit, Michigan, U.S.
- Education: University of Michigan (BA)
- Occupation: Novelist
- Writing career
- Genres: Historical fiction, satire, contemporary fiction
- Notable works: The Kingsley House, How (Not) to Have a Perfect Wedding, The Secret Confessions of Anne Shakespeare, Sanctuary, The Coloring Scroll, The Passion of Hubert, Ten Photos.
- Website: arlissryan.com

Arliss Ryan (born July 24, 1950) is an American novelist, short story writer and essayist. Her seven novels include historical fiction, contemporary fiction and satire. Her short stories and essays have appeared in literary and commercial magazines.

Ryan graduated Phi Beta Kappa from the University of Michigan with a B.A. in English in 1971. For a time, Ryan worked at the United Nations as an administrative assistant, before pursuing writing full-time. Ryan's first novel, The Kingsley House, weaves stories around her ancestral home and was published by St. Martin's Press in 2000. It was featured in a 2000 volume of Reader's Digest Select Editions. The original Kingsley House still stands in Greenmead Historical Park in Livonia, Michigan. Ryan's second novel, the satirical How (Not) to Have a Perfect Wedding, was published by Sourcebooks in 2007 and was inspired by Ryan's experiences working on the event staff at the Astors' Beechwood mansion.

Ryan's third novel, The Secret Confessions of Anne Shakespeare, is a work of historical fiction that takes romantic and creative liberties with the Shakespeare authorship question. In it, Ryan postulates William Shakespeare's wife Anne Hathaway is the true author of many of Shakespeare's plays. It was published by New American Library/Penguin Books in 2010.

Sanctuary, her fourth novel, is a tale of secrets, redemption, and the healing power of art and nature, as the lives of three women converge at a rundown New England estate.

In 2017, Ryan and her husband, naval architect Eric Sponberg, left the United States to sail around the world in their 35-foot sailboat Corroboree. Her website blog, "The Old Woman and the Sea", chronicles their ongoing voyage.
