= Extreme Measures =

- Theatrical release poster
- Directed by: Michael Apted
- Screenplay by: Tony Gilroy
- Based on: Extreme Measures by Michael Palmer
- Produced by: Elizabeth Hurley
- Starring: Hugh Grant; Gene Hackman; Sarah Jessica Parker; David Morse; Paul Guilfoyle; Debra Monk
- Cinematography: John Bailey
- Edited by: Rick Shaine
- Music by: Danny Elfman
- Production companies: Castle Rock Entertainment; Simian Films
- Distributed by: Columbia Pictures (through Sony Pictures Releasing; United States); Rank-Castle Rock/Turner (United Kingdom)
- Release dates: September 27, 1996 (US); January 31, 1997 (UK)
- Running time: 118 minutes
- Countries: United Kingdom; United States
- Language: English
- Budget: $38 million
- Box office: $17.4 million

Extreme Measures is a 1996 crime thriller film based on Michael Palmer's 1991 novel of the same name, dealing with the ethics of medical sacrifices. The film was directed by Michael Apted and starred Hugh Grant, Gene Hackman, Sarah Jessica Parker, and David Morse.

Extreme Measures was released on September 27, 1996 by Columbia Pictures (through Sony Pictures Releasing) in the United States and on January 31, 1997 by Rank-Castle Rock/Turner in the United Kingdom. The film received mixed reviews from critics and was a box office bomb, grossing $17.4 million against a $38 million budget.

== Plot ==
Dr. Guy Luthan is a New York emergency room doctor who one night comes across a strange patient: a homeless man who has a wristband from a hospital he is not familiar with, mentioning a drug he has never heard of, and with strange symptoms, including a wildly fluctuating heart rate. When the man dies, Guy attempts to follow up and find out more about the patient - only to find that the body and all records have disappeared, and he's told by his superiors to drop the case.

As he continues trying to find out what happened, Guy's personal and professional life get suddenly sidetracked. His home is ransacked and cocaine is planted near his bedside. The police arrest him and he is convicted and in the process he loses his job, his license to practice medicine and all of his friends. In desperation, he manages to get the help of some homeless men who lead him to their underground home. His ER patient who died also had lived there. Through them he's led to an organization, led by neurologist Dr. Lawrence Myrick, that performs spinal experiments on the homeless people, all of whom have died thus far, in an attempt to find a cure for paralysis.

Myrick attempts to sway Guy to join his team, telling him that his "test subjects" are heroes, and that killing one to save millions is worth the sacrifice. Guy admits that while there is some truth in what Myrick says, Myrick's victims did not choose to give up their lives, which makes Myrick a murderer. In a struggle between Guy and rogue FBI Agent Frank Hare, Myrick is accidentally shot and killed. Later, Myrick's widow hands the discs and documentation regarding the research to Guy, telling him, "My husband was trying to do a good thing, but in the wrong way." He opens the package, views the materials and proceeds towards the neurology building where he is now working.

== Main cast ==
- Hugh Grant as Dr. Guy Luthan
- Gene Hackman as Dr. Lawrence Myrick
- Sarah Jessica Parker as Jodie Trammel
- David Morse as FBI Agent Frank Hare
- Bill Nunn as Det. Bob Burke
- John Toles-Bey as Bobby
- Paul Guilfoyle as Dr. Jeffrey Manko
- Debra Monk as Dr. Judith Gruszynski
- Shaun Austin-Olsen as Claude Minkins
- André De Shields as Teddy Dolson
- J. K. Simmons as Dr. Mingus
- Peter Appel as Det. Stone
- Diana Zimmer as Helen
- Nancy Beatty as Ruth Myrick
- Gerry Becker as Dr. Gene Spitelli
- Gene Ruffini as Izzy
- Bill MacDonald as Det. Stone's Partner
- Simon Reynolds as Simon
- D. Garnet Harding as E.R. Doctor
- Derwin Jordan as E.R. Doctor
- Tara Rosling as E.R. Doctor
- Martin Roach as E.R. Doctor
- Bernard Browne as E.R. Doctor
- Sanjay Talwar as E.R. Doctor
- Christina Collins as E.R. Nurse
- Arlene Duncan as E.R. Nurse
- Cheryl Swarts as E.R. Nurse

== Production ==
The film was based on a 1991 novel by Michael Palmer. It was originally developed as a vehicle for Alec Baldwin.

Then it went to Simian Films, the company of Hugh Grant and his then-girlfriend Elizabeth Hurley, which had set up at Castle Rock Entertainment. The film marked a change of pace for Grant, being a drama. "I was always on the lookout for one (a drama), but I wasn't saying, `I've got to do a serious role now.' It was just that that was the best script around."

The script was developed for about a year, including rewrites with involvement from William Goldman. "We just tamed it a bit for me," said Grant. "We just tweaked it."

Palmer said, "They apologized for the way they deviated from the book. Hugh Grant has turned the protagonist into a character he can live with, but the nature of the character hasn't changed. The more I think about it, the more it seems like my book."

Filming took place in Toronto and New York City, beginning February 1996.

Director Michael Apted found it challenging working with Grant and Hurley. "It's not something I'd recommend, however genial the people are.... It was tricky. We had the same agendas, mercifully, so it was all right.... Producers are powerful. And actors are powerful these days. So, to have the double whammy up there, it makes your job harder. The other challenge I had was that this was the first film they (Hurley and Grant) produced. They were learning as they were doing.... I didn't know whether they were going to be dilettante producers.... They really got their hands dirty. They weren't just swanning in for the glamour bits. They were there the whole time in the trenches."

Added Hurley: "I've been on film sets for about nine years as a hired hand so it wasn't that I didn't know anything.... Yes, there are things I know now that I didn't know before. But there are things a monkey could learn to do.... I think learning to keep on top of things ... You have to, sort of, learn that as you go. I hadn't realized how fragile a film could be. I did end up being very hands-on. I ended up doing much more than I had expected to. I didn't realize how easy it was to really not make the film you set out to make.... I think having to concentrate very, very hard on every department was a shock."

== Reception ==
The film had a mixed reception from critics. It currently holds a 56% rating on Rotten Tomatoes. Roger Ebert and Gene Siskel both gave the film 3 out of 4 stars. Ebert mentioned in his review that the film is "pitched at a higher level than most thrillers; the dialogue is literate and intelligent, and Grant is more of an everyman than an action hero." Grant's performance received particular praise for this film, along with An Awfully Big Adventure, for playing against type in his post-Four Weddings and a Funeral career in the late 1990s. Kenneth Turan, who disliked the film, said of Grant's performance: "Though he doesn't have enough weight to stabilize the film when the plotting turns silly, overall he does a capable job in an unlikely role." Janet Maslin, writing in The New York Times, was generally positive about the film, describing it as "stylish and taut with a taste for macabre little surprises".

=== Box office ===
Despite debuting in second place at the US box office, the film was not a box office success. It opened at third place at the UK box office.
