= Lost Lake (novel) =

2014 novel by Sarah Addison Allen

- Author: Sarah Addison Allen
- Language: English
- Genre: Fiction
- Publisher: St. Martin’s Press
- Publication date: 2014
- Publication place: USA
- Media type: Print (hardback)
- Pages: 304
- ISBN: 978-1250019806

Lost Lake is a light fantasy novel written in 2014 by Sarah Addison Allen. It was written during the author’s bout with advanced stage cancer.

== Plot ==
Lost Lake is a story about a widow, Kate Pheris, who discovers a trunk in her attic, with a postcard addressed to her from her great-aunt Eby. Together with her daughter, Devin, Kate moves to Eby’s home in Georgia to recover from grief due to her husband’s death. Upon arrival, they discover that Eby is about to sell her resort camp. She has been running her resort with her husband George but is contemplating of letting it go after his death. She then reconsiders as both women and some of the resort’s regulars decide to piece their lives back together and discover a little magic in the land.

== Characters ==
The protagonist, Kate, has been a widow for one year. She lived in the city with her eight-year-old daughter Devin. To move on and escape from the clutches of her controlling mother-in-law, she moved to Georgia. Eby, her grand-aunt, has been living a long and peaceful life with George. But when her husband died she also decides to move on through the sale of her beloved resort to a seedy land developer. Devin, was the one who discovered the letter in the attic and helped the two women reconnect.

== Major themes ==
Aside from grief, loneliness, and death, themes included old memories and second chances. According to Allen, she did not want to write about cancer but about grief that is why the characters there go through the worst problems but they end in a new, different place. Allen also introduced the fairy tale theme once the main characters converged at Lost Lake. The story-mystery in each character’s storyline is also a common theme in the novel.
