= Down East (magazine) =

Monthly magazine in Maine

- Editor: Will Grunewald
- Former editors: Brian Kevin, Kathleen Fleury, Paul Doiron, D. W. Kuhnert, Davis Thomas, Duane Doolittle
- Categories: Regional magazine
- Frequency: Monthly
- Publisher: Bob Fernald
- Total circulation (June 2019): 90,000
- Founder: Duane Doolittle
- Founded: 1954
- Company: Down East Enterprise
- Country: USA
- Based in: Camden, Maine
- Language: English
- Website: www.downeast.com
- ISSN: 0012-5776
- OCLC: 1683246

Down East: The Magazine of Maine is the principal general interest monthly magazine covering the U.S. state of Maine. It is based in Rockport, Maine, with a second office in Yarmouth, Maine. It covers a range of topics including travel, food, the arts, the environment, politics, business, and lifestyle in the state of Maine.

Down East was founded in 1954 by Duane Doolittle and loosely modeled on The New Yorker. Herbert Jacob Seligman wrote for it in the 1950s including an entry on Marsden Hartley.

Down East enjoys the largest paid circulation of any publication in the state, peaking at more than 80,000 during the summer, with 53% of its readership aged 55 and above, 38% aged 35–54, and 9% 18–34. Global readership exceeds 380,000. It is Maine's only audited and verified magazine. The magazine is published twelve times a year by its parent company, Down East Enterprise, Inc., which also publishes Shooting Sportsman magazine. In 2013, Down East Enterprise sold a book publishing arm to Rowman & Littlefield.

In 2013, Kathleen Fleury became the first woman to serve as editor in chief, a position she held until 2018. Author Paul Doiron is a former editor in chief. Will Grunewald is the current editor in chief and Bob Fernald is President, CEO, and Publisher. Martha Stewart and Sam Sifton have served as guest editors.

Down East Magazine and Vermont Life Magazine together founded the International Regional Magazine Association in 1960. The magazine is a member of the International Regional Magazine Association, the City and Regional Magazine Association, and the Circulation Verification Council.

Down East compiles an annual "Best of Maine" list, making recommendations on where to "eat, drink, shop, stay, and unwind" in the state.

== Down East Marketplace ==
The 1,700-square-foot Down East Marketplace, complete with an "Experience Maine" interactive kiosk and Down East–branded TV programming about Maine, is located in the Portland Jetport, selling magazines, books, food, clothing, travel accessories, and gifts.

== Lobster roll competition ==
The magazine held the inaugural Down East Lobster Roll Festival in July 2017 in Portland, Maine, with a central focus of selecting the best lobster roll. The Winner of the "World's Best Lobster Roll" went to Freshies Lobster in Park City, Utah. The restaurant uses lobster meat and New England–style buns flown in from Maine. BeetleCat, of Atlanta, Georgia, took top honors in 2018.

== Maine's "70 Over 70" ==
In November 2021, Down East compiled a list of Maine's "70 Over 70," highlighting "folks who've broken barriers, who are considered heroes or legends in their communities, who've shown extraordinary dedication to their passions and plunged into new ones at an age when many of us are slowing down." One example is Virginia Oliver, a 101-year-old resident of Rockland, Maine who has been lobstering for more than nine decades.

== Maine Homes by Down East ==
Maine Homes by Down East was a quarterly publication aimed at Maine homeowners and those interested in the Maine real estate market. It ceased publication in fall 2023. Maine Homes featured stories about Maine architecture, landscaping, interior design, and other topics. It began in 1994 with the website MaineHomes.com. In 2018, the magazine launched the Maine Homes Design Awards competition, showcasing Maine amateurs and professionals who create "world-class homes all over the state."

Sarah Stebbins, a native of Cousins Island, Maine, served as editor of the publication. Ben Williamson was the magazine's photography director.
