= When the Men Were Gone =

2018 fictionalized WWII novel by Marjorie Herrera Lewis

First edition

When the Men Were Gone is a historical fiction 2018 novel by Marjorie Herrera Lewis. The book, published by William Morrow, an imprint of HarperCollins, is based on the true story of Tylene Wilson, a teacher and an assistant principal in Brownwood, Texas, during World War II. Wilson volunteered to coach the Daniel Baker College football team in 1944 when the coach left to serve in the war. Lewis took poetic license in the novel, in which Wilson coaches at Brownwood High School.

== Story ==
When WWII pulls all the men ages 18–45 away, there is little hope Brownwood High School's football team will get another season. Raised from a young age to love the sport, assistant principal Tylene Wilson steps up to coach the team and ensure the boys have something more to look forward to than military service after graduation. As she prepared her boys for the games ahead, she faces extreme opposition—both on and off the football field—and challenges her community's ideas of a woman's role in sports.

== Reception ==
In May 2019, the book was selected by Newsweek as one of the "Best Books of 2019 So Far". It was honored at the American Book Fest's 2019 Best Book Awards, winning in the Fiction: Historical and Best New Fiction categories, and placed in three categories at the New Mexico/Arizona Book Awards (Historical Fiction, Young Adult Fiction, and Sports). The book was included in Reader's Digest Select Editions 2019, Volume 363, #1.

According to Sports Illustrated, the book "sublimely ties together the drama of high school football, gender politics, and the impact of war on a small town in Texas". Conversely, Publishers Weekly wrote of the book, "The woman’s empowerment angle is inspiring (Lewis’s book is based on true events), but the story ends where football fans would want it to start, at the beginning of the playing season, leaving the story feeling incomplete."
