= Irish Country series =

Historical fiction by Patrick Taylor

The Irish Country Novels
- Author: Patrick Taylor
- Language: English
- Genre: Historical fiction
- Publisher: Forge Books
- Published: February 6, 2007 – Present
- Media type: Print (hardcover and paperback), Audiobook

The Irish Country Novels are an ongoing series of historical fiction books written by Patrick Taylor and published by Forge Books. The first book in the series, An Irish Country Doctor, was originally published as The Apprenticeship of Doctor Laverty by Insomniac Press in 2004 and was short listed for the BC Book awards fiction prize 2005.

An Irish Country Doctor became a New York Times bestseller upon its republication in 2007 and was named Book of the Month Club's Novel of the Month in March 2007. It has been translated into thirteen other languages.

Several sequels in the series have also become international bestsellers, particularly in Canada, where Taylor has resided since 1970. When An Irish Country Christmas appeared in mass market paperback in 2010 it reached No 17 on the New York Times and 86 on the USA Today bestseller lists.

Set in Ballybucklebo, a fictional village in rural Northern Ireland, the series follows novice doctor Barry Laverty as he begins his assistantship at the practice of Dr. Fingal Flahertie O'Reilly. The sixth and eighth books of the series, A Dublin Student Doctor and Fingal O'Reilly, Irish Doctor, explore the life of Dr. O'Reilly prior to the events of An Irish Country Doctor.

== Bibliography ==
=== Novels ===
1. The Apprenticeship of Doctor Laverty, 2000; published in the U.S. as An Irish Country Doctor, 2007
2. An Irish Country Village, 2008
3. An Irish Country Christmas, 2008
4. An Irish Country Girl, 2010
5. An Irish Country Courtship, 2010
6. A Dublin Student Doctor, 2011
7. An Irish Country Wedding, 2012
8. Fingal O'Reilly, Irish Doctor, 2013
9. An Irish Doctor in Peace and at War, 2014
10. An Irish Doctor in Love and at Sea, 2015
11. An Irish Country Love Story, 2016
12. An Irish Country Practice, 2017
13. An Irish Country Cottage, 2018
14. An Irish Country Family, 2019
15. An Irish Country Welcome, 2020
16. An Irish Country Yuletide, 2021

=== Short stories ===
- Home is the Sailor, 2013
- The Wily O'Reilly: Irish Country Stories, 2014

=== Other ===
- An Irish Country Cookbook, 2017 (includes ten short stories)
