= Elizabeth Adler =

British author

- Born: 1950 (age 75–76); Yorkshire, England
- Education: University of Leeds
- Writing career
- Pen name: Ariana Scott
- Years active: 1985–present
- Genres: Romance, suspense, mystery
- Notable works: The Charmers; One Way or Another; Last to Know; Please Don't Tell
- Website: elizabethadler.com

Elizabeth Adler (born 1950) is a British author who has written over 20 novels. She writes romance, suspense and historical fiction novels. She has also published work under the name Ariana Scott. Her works have been translated into 22 languages.

== Personal life ==
Adler was born in Yorkshire, in Northern England in 1950. She has lived in England, Canada, Ireland and Spain. Her husband, Richard, is American. They met whilst Adler was working in London at a talent agency. Together, they have one daughter.

== Career ==
Private Desires, Adler's first novel, was published in the UK in 1985. It was also published in the United States at the same time, with the title Léonie. Her work has appeared in several Reader's Digest Select Editions: Sooner or Later (Volume 238 - #4 in 1998), Sailing in Capri (Volume 288 - #6 in 2006) and Meet Me in Venice (Volume 295 - #1 in 2008).

== Bibliography ==
Mac Reilly Series:

- One of those Malibu Nights (Mac Reilly # 1) (2009)
- There's Something About St. Tropez (Mac Reilly # 2) (2010)
- It All Began in Monte Carlo (Mac Reilly # 3) (2011)
- From Barcelona, With Love (Mac Reilly # 4) (2012)

Standalone books:

- Private Desires (1985)
- Indiscretions (1985)
- Peach (1986)
- Fleeting Images (1987)
- The Rich Shall Inherit (1989)
- All or Nothing (1989)
- The Property of a Lady (1990)
- Fortune Is a Woman (1992)
- Present of the Past (1993)
- Legacy of Secrets (1993)
- The Secret of the Villa Mimosa (1994)
- The Heiresses (1995)
- Now or Never (1996)
- No Regrets (1997)
- Sooner or Later (1997)
- In a Heartbeat (2000)
- The Last Time I Saw Paris (2001)
- Summer in Tuscany (2002)
- The Hotel Riviera (2003)
- Invitation to Provence (2004)
- The House in Amalfi (2005)
- Sailing to Capri (2006)
- Meet Me in Venice (2007)
- A Place in the Country (2012)
- Please Don't Tell (2013)
- Last to Know (2014)
- One Way or Another (2015)
- The Charmers (2016)
- Better Than Revenge (2019)
