= Peter Pezzelli =

American novelist

- Born: January 28, 1959 (age 67); Providence, Rhode Island, U.S.
- Education: Wesleyan University
- Children: 2

Peter Pezzelli (born January 28, 1959) is an American author from Narragansett, Rhode Island, who has written five novels.

== Biography ==
Peter Pezzelli was born and raised in Rhode Island, Peter Pezzelli grew up in the town of North Providence. A graduate of La Salle Academy, he completed a year of prep school at Phillips Academy Andover before attending Wesleyan University where he earned a bachelor's degree in English.

After college, Pezzelli traveled for several weeks in Italy before coming home to begin training to be an administrator in his family's nursing home business. He did not begin dabbling on the side with a writing career until later in his twenties when his girlfriend (and future wife) bought him an electric typewriter for his birthday. Not long after, while laid up recovering from knee surgery necessitated by a series of unfortunate rugby injuries, he decided to pass the time by writing short stories. He later enrolled in some creative writing workshops at Brown University and eventually began in his spare time to submit freelance articles to Rhode Island Monthly and other local magazines and newspapers.

In time Pezzelli decided to put aside short stories and freelance writing, and try his hand at writing a novel. He wrote several before finally penning Home To Italy. Published by Kensington Books in 2004, the story earned acclaim as a Book Sense "Pick" in September of that year and later as a "First Novel of Distinction".

Pezzelli's novels, all set primarily in Rhode Island or Italy, have been translated worldwide into over a dozen languages. His stories of life, love, friendship, and family have been featured in Reader's Digest Select Editions, Doubleday Book Club, and are favorites of library book clubs around the U.S.

== Books ==
- Home to Italy (2004) ISBN 0-7582-0768-9
- Every Sunday (2005) ISBN 0-7582-0770-0
- Francesca's Kitchen (2006) ISBN 0-7582-1327-1
- Italian Lessons (2007) ISBN 0-7582-2050-2
- Villa Mirabella (2010)
- The Glassblower's Apprentice (2013)

== See also ==
Famous people from Rhode Island
