= Marjorie Herrera Lewis =

American sports journalist and novelist (born 1957)

Marjorie Herrera Lewis (born 1957) is an American sports journalist best known for her 2018 novel When the Men Were Gone. In 2018, the book was selected by Sports Illustrated as one of the best sports books in its year-in-review issue. In 2017, at age 60, Lewis coached defensive backs at Texas Wesleyan University, making her the only female college football coach at any level that year. In 1984, Lewis joined the Fort Worth Star-Telegram and later became the first female beat writer to cover the Dallas Cowboys.

== Early life and education ==
Born and raised in Santa Fe, New Mexico, Lewis was the second of five children. Her father is a retired dentist, and her mother is a retired accountant. In 1975, Lewis graduated from St. Michael's High School in Santa Fe, where she competed in basketball, softball, flag football, tennis, and volleyball.

Lewis holds a BS from Arizona State University, an MA from the University of Texas at Arlington, and an MFA from Southern New Hampshire University. Lewis also has certificates from Southern Methodist University and Cornell University.

== Career ==
Lewis was the sports editor for the Kilgore News Herald from 1983 to 1984. In 1984, Lewis became the first woman hired as a sports writer at the Fort Worth Star-Telegram. In 1986, she became the first woman assigned to the Dallas Cowboys beat. Lewis started writing for The Dallas Morning News in 1989. During her career with the Fort Worth Star-Telegram and the Dallas Morning News, Lewis covered the Dallas Cowboys, the Dallas Mavericks, the Texas Rangers, Wimbledon, and the Davis Cup.

In 2017, Lewis joined the coaching staff of the Texas Wesleyan University football team in Fort Worth, Texas.

Lewis is co-editor of SportsDay Bound (second edition, Abilene Christian University Press, 2018), a collection of sports stories published by the Dallas Morning News.

Lewis wrote When the Men Were Gone (William Morrow, an imprint of HarperCollins), which Newsweek included on its list of "Best Books of 2019 So Far". The book was released on October 2, 2018. The historical fiction novel is based on the life of Tylene Wilson, a teacher and assistant principal in Brownwood, Texas, during World War II, who volunteered to coach the Daniel Baker College football team in 1944 when the coach left to serve in the war.

Lewis taught media ethics and digital media writing classes at the University of North Texas. Lewis taught the sports writing class at the University of Texas at Arlington.

Since 2015, Lewis has endowed the Marjorie Herrera Lewis Speakers Series at Texas Wesleyan University. Guest speakers have included retired athlete Daryl Johnston of the Dallas Cowboys and Foxcatcher author David Thomas.

=== Recognition ===
On February 10, 2018, Lewis received recognition during halftime of the University of Tulsa women's basketball game (vs. Houston) for the 32nd anniversary of National Girls and Women in Sports Day.
