= David Rosenfelt =

American novelist

- Born: Paterson, New Jersey, U.S.
- Education: New York University
- Occupation: Writer
- Writing career
- Genre: Mystery novels
- Website: davidrosenfelt.com

David Rosenfelt is an American author who has written thirty-three novels and three TV movies. The main character in most of his mystery books is Andy Carpenter, attorney and dog lover.

== Biography ==
Rosenfelt graduated from New York University and then decided to work in the movie business. After being interviewed by his uncle, who was the President of United Artists, he was hired and worked his way up the corporate culture. Rosenfelt eventually became the marketing president for Tri-Star Pictures. He married and had two children during this period.

Rosenfelt left the corporate industry and wrote screenplays for movies and television. He turned to writing novels and has become quite successful in that genre. In 1995, he and his wife started the "Tara Foundation" which has saved over 4,000 dogs. He is a dog lover and supports more than two dozen dogs.

== Style ==
Rosenfelt, who is a dog lover and who has worked with many lawyers in his occupation, created the character Andy Carpenter, an attorney who faces corporate cultures and who is a dog lover.

== Format ==
Rosenfelt books run in the low to mid 300 pages with 15 basic beats and about 40 scenes fairly consistent with movie and television formats.

== Books ==
=== Standalone Fiction ===
- Don't Tell A Soul, 2008, Minotaur Books, ISBN 978-0312373955
- Down to the Wire, 2010, Minotaur Books, ISBN 978-0312373948
- On Borrowed Time, 2011, Minotaur Books, ISBN 978-0312598365
- Heart of a Killer, 2012, Minotaur Books, ISBN 978-0312598372
- Airtight, 2013, Minotaur Books, ISBN 9781250040763
- Without Warning, 2014, Minotaur Books, ISBN 9781250305848

=== Andy Carpenter series ===
1. Open and Shut, 2002, Grand Central Publishing ISBN 978-0446555128
  - Finalist for the Edgar Award and the Shamus Award for best first novel.
2. First Degree, 2003, Grand Central Publishing, ISBN 978-0446555111
3. Bury the Lead, 2004, Grand Central Publishing ISBN 978-0446612869
  - Selection of the NBC Today Book Club.
4. Sudden Death, 2005, Mysterious Press, ISBN 978-0892967834
5. Dead Center, 2006, Mysterious Press, ISBN 978-0892960026
6. Play Dead, 2007, Grand Central Publishing, ISBN 978-0446582414
7. New Tricks, 2009, Grand Central Publishing, ISBN 978-0446505871
8. Dog Tags, 2010, Grand Central Publishing, ISBN 978-0446551526
9. One Dog Night, 2011, Minotaur Books, ISBN 978-0312647995
10. Leader of the Pack, 2012, Minotaur Books, ISBN 978-0312648046
11. Unleashed, 2013, Minotaur Books, ISBN 9781250024725
12. Hounded, 2014, Minotaur Books, ISBN 9781250024749
13. Who Let the Dog Out?, 2015, Minotaur Books, ISBN 9781250055330
14. Outfoxed, 2016, Minotaur Books, ISBN 9781250055347
15. The Twelve Dogs of Christmas, 2017, Minotaur Books, ISBN 9781250145611
16. Collared, 2017, Minotaur Books, ISBN 9781250055354
17. Rescued, 2018, Minotaur Books, ISBN 9781250133069
18. Deck the Hounds, 2018, Minotaur Books, ISBN 9781250198488
19. Bark of Night, 2019, Minotaur Books, ISBN 9781250133090
20. Dachshund Through the Snow, 2019, Minotaur Books, ISBN 9781250237682
21. Muzzled, 2020, Minotaur Books, ISBN 9781250257116
22. Silent Bite, 2020, Minotaur Books, ISBN 9781250257147
23. Dog Eat Dog, 2021, Minotaur Books, ISBN 9781250257123
24. Best In Snow, 2021, Minotaur Books, ISBN 9781250257178
25. Holy Chow, 2022, Minotaur Books, ISBN 9781250828873
26. Santa's Little Yelpers, 2022, Minotaur Books, ISBN 9781250828811
27. Flop Dead Gorgeous, 2023, Minotaur Books, ISBN 9781250828903
28. Twas the Bite Before Christmas, 2023, Minotaur Books, ISBN 9781250828842

=== The K Team ===
Andy Carpenter spinoff series.

1. The K Team, 2020, Minotaur Books, ISBN 9781250257192
2. Animal Instinct, 2021, Minotaur Books, ISBN 9781250257208
3. Citizen K-9, 2022, Minotaur Books, ISBN 9781250828934
4. Good Dog, Bad Cop, 2023, Minotaur Books, ISBN 9781250828965

=== Doug Brock series ===
1. Blackout, 2016, Minotaur Books, ISBN 978-1250055316
2. Fade to Black, 2018, Minotaur Books, ISBN 978-1250133120
3. Black and Blue, 2019, Minotaur Books, ISBN 9781250133144

=== Nonfiction ===
- Dogtripping: 25 Rescues, 11 Volunteers, and 3 RVs on Our Canine Cross-Country Adventure, 2013, St. Martin's Press, ISBN 9781250014696
- Lessons from Tara: Life Advice from the World’s Most Brilliant Dog, 2015, St. Martin's Press, ISBN 9781250065766

== Articles ==
- "Whatever You Do, Don't Kill the Dog"
- "Integrity and Humility"
