= Italian Lessons =

2007 novel by Peter Pezzelli

- First edition cover
- Author: Peter Pezzelli
- Cover artist: George Angelini
- Language: English
- Genre: Fiction
- Publisher: Kensington
- Publication date: October 1, 2007
- Publication place: United States
- Media type: Trade Paperback
- Pages: 320
- ISBN: 0-7582-2050-2
- OCLC: 172616356
- Dewey Decimal: 813/.6 22
- LC Class: PS3616.E98 I83 2007

Italian Lessons is a novel by Peter Pezzelli. It was published in trade paperback by Kensington Publishing on October 1, 2007.

== Reception ==
Publishers Weekly reviewed the book saying Pezzelli "brings his fans a light if sometimes trite story of two lovelorn men who form an unlikely friendship... Pezzelli makes readers want to believe in love at first sight, and his earnest storytelling should win over its share of readers."

Ron Terpening in Library Journal described the book as telling "an engaging story that is as leisurely paced and satisfying as a fine Italian meal".
