= Francesca's Kitchen =

2006 novel by Peter Pezzelli

- First edition cover
- Author: Peter Pezzelli
- Cover artist: George Angelini
- Language: English
- Genre: Fiction
- Publisher: Kensington
- Publication date: September 1, 2006
- Publication place: United States
- Media type: Trade Paperback
- Pages: 340
- ISBN: 0-7582-1327-1
- OCLC: 71053816
- Dewey Decimal: 813/.54 22
- LC Class: PS3616.E98 F73 2006

Francesca's Kitchen is a novel by Peter Pezzelli. It was published in trade paperback by Kensington Publishing in 2006.

== Reception ==
A Publishers Weekly review says, "Most of the action happens in kitchens: home cooking, good pasta and traditional family values conquer all in this amusing and touching story". An Albuquerque Journal review says, "The glowing characters, with their refreshingly human fears and insecurities, are fun and familiar, capturing the everyday emotions of regular people". Sheri Melnick, of Romantic Times, reviewed the book saying, "Filled with warmth and humor, Pezzelli's latest novel entices. Readers won't want to put down this richly detailed novel as two very different women find a common bond and develop a highly rewarding relationship. And the scrumptious recipes at the end are a fine addition to the captivating conclusion".
