= Outwitting Trolls =

Novel by William G. Tapply

Outwitting Trolls is a murder mystery written by William G. Tapply that takes place in Boston. This is the last book in the Brady Coyne series published after Tapply's death. Coyne, a lawyer, is retained by Sharon Nickels after discovering the body of her ex-husband Ken. Coyne, a former neighbor and friend, assists Sharon who is accused of stabbing Ken in a hotel room.
