= Linda Castillo =

American novelist

Linda Castillo is an American author of novels including The New York Times and USA Today bestselling Kate Burkholder series, which are crime thrillers set in Amish country. The first book, Sworn to Silence (2009), was adapted into a Lifetime original movie titled An Amish Murder starring Neve Campbell. She has also written numerous romance and romantic suspense novels. Castillo grew up in Arcanum, Ohio and now lives in Texas with her husband.

== Awards and honors ==
Castillo is the recipient of the Daphne du Maurier Award and the Holt Medallion. She has been nominated for the RITA Award, for the Mystery Writers of America's Sue Grafton Memorial Award, and for the International Thriller Writers Award for Best Hardcover.

== Publications ==
=== Kate Burkholder series ===
1. Sworn to Silence, Minotaur Books, 2009, ISBN 0-312-37497-6
2. Pray for Silence, Minotaur Books, 2010, ISBN 0312374984 / ISBN 9780312374983
3. Breaking Silence, Minotaur Books, 2011, ISBN 978-0-312-37499-0
4. Gone missing, Minotaur Books, 2012, ISBN 978-0-312-65856-4
5. Her Last Breath, Minotaur Books, 2013, ISBN 978-0-312-65857-1
6. The Dead Will Tell, Minotaur Books, 2014, ISBN 978-1-250-02957-7
7. After the Storm, Minotaur Books, 2015, ISBN 9781250061560
8. Among the Wicked, Minotaur Books, 2016, ISBN 9781250061577
9. Down a Dark Road, Minotaur Books, 2017, ISBN 978-1250121288
10. A Gathering of Secrets, Minotaur Books, 2018, ISBN 9781250121318
11. Shamed, Minotaur Books, 2019, ISBN 9781250142863
12. Outsider, Minotaur Books, 2020, ISBN 9781250142894
13. Fallen, Minotaur Books, 2021, ISBN 9781250142924
14. The Hidden One, Minotaur Books, 2022, ISBN 9781250781055
15. An Evil Heart, Minotaur Books, 2023, ISBN 9781250906823
16. The Burning, Minotaur Books, 2024, ISBN 9781250781116
17. Rage, Minotaur Books, 2025, ISBN 978-1250781154

==== Kate Burkholder Short Stories ====
- Collected in A Simple Murder, Minotaur Books, 2021, ISBN 9781250783615
  - Long Lost, Minotaur Books, 2013, ISBN 9781466836884
  - A Hidden Secret, Minotaur Books, 2015, ISBN 9781250082008
  - Seeds of Deception, Minotaur Books, 2016, ISBN 9781250112552
  - Only the Lucky, Minotaur Books, 2017, ISBN 9781250157560
  - In Dark Company, Minotaur Books, 2018, ISBN 9781250314161
  - In Plain Sight, Minotaur Books, 2019, ISBN 9781250246417
- The Pact, Minotaur Books, 2020, ISBN 9781250776457
- Disappeared, Minotaur Books, 2021, ISBN 9781250824554
- Blood Moon, Minotaur Books, 2022, ISBN 9781250871909

=== Other books ===
- Remember the Night (Men in Blue), Silhouette, 2000, ISBN 978-0373270781
- Cops and … Lovers?, Silhouette, 2001, ISBN 0373271557 / ISBN 9780373271559
- Hero to Hold, Silhouette, 2001, ISBN 0373271727 (ISBN 9780373271726)
- Just a Little Bit Dangerous, Silhouette, 2002, ISBN 978-0373272150
- The Perfect Victim, Jove Books, 2002, ISBN 0-515-13370-1
- A Cry in the Night, Harlequin, 2003, ISBN 9780373272563
- Midnight Run, Silhouette, 2003, ISBN 978-0373273294
- The Phoenix Encounter, Silhouette, 2003, ISBN 9780373272785
- The Shadow Side, Berkley, 2003, ISBN 978-0425191026
- Uncharted Waters, Harlequin, 2003, ISBN 9780373613816
- Fade to Red, Berkley, 2004, ISBN 978-0425196571
- Dead Reckoning, Berkley Sensation, 2005, ISBN 978-0425207208
- Depth Perception, Berkley, 2005, ISBN 978-0425201091
- Operation: Midnight Cowboy, Harlequin, 2005, ISBN 978-0373692309
- Operation: Midnight Escape, Harlequin, 2005, ISBN 978-0373228904
- Operation: Midnight Tango, Harlequin, 2005, ISBN 9781459228566
- Operation: Midnight Guardian, Harlequin, 2006, ISBN 978-0373229208
- Operation: Midnight Rendezvous, Harlequin, 2006, ISBN 978-0373229406
- A Whisper in the Dark, Berkley Sensation, 2006, ISBN 042521138X
- A Baby Before Dawn, Harlequin, 2007, ISBN 9780373692675
- In the Dead of the Night, Harlequin, 2007, ISBN 978-0373692873
- Overkill, Berkley Trade, 2007, ISBN 9780425218297
