= Paul Doiron =

American novelist

- Occupation: Author
- Spouse: Kristen Lindquist
- Writing career
- Genre: Crime fiction
- Notable awards: Barry Award (2011)

Paul Doiron (pronounced /ˈdwɑːrən/) is the author of the Mike Bowditch series of crime novels.

== Career ==
The first book in the Mike Bowditch series, The Poacher's Son, won the Barry Award for Best First Novel and the Strand Critics Award for Best First Novel. It was a nominee for the Edgar Award for Best First Novel and for the Anthony Award for Best First Novel PopMatters included it in its Best Fiction of 2010 list.

Doiron's second book Trespasser won the 2012 Maine Literary Award for Crime Fiction.

His novelette "Rabid" was a finalist for the 2019 Edgar Award for Best Short Story.

His twelfth novel Dead by Dawn won the 2022 New England Society Book Award for Fiction, the 2022 Maine Literary Award for Crime Fiction and was a finalist for the 2022 Barry Award for Best Thriller.

Doiron won the Maine Writers & Publishers Alliance CrimeMaster Award at the 2025 Maine Crime Wave.

Doiron is the former Editor in Chief and current Editor Emeritus of Down East, The Magazine of Maine.

== Personal life ==
In 1988 Doiron and two friends were struck by lightning while camped near the Appalachian Trail in Maine and survived. He has cited the incident as inspiring him to write about the Maine outdoors.

Doiron is married to poet and environmentalist Kristen Lindquist.

He resides in Camden, Maine.

== Bibliography ==
=== Mike Bowditch Mysteries ===
1. The Poacher's Son, Minotaur Books, 2010
2. Trespasser, Minotaur Books, 2011
3. Bad Little Falls, Minotaur Books, 2012
4. Massacre Pond, Minotaur Books, 2013
5. The Bone Orchard, Minotaur Books, 2014
6. The Precipice, Minotaur Books, 2015
7. Widowmaker, Minotaur Books, 2016
8. Knife Creek, Minotaur Books, 2017
9. Stay Hidden, Minotaur Books, 2018
10. Almost Midnight, Minotaur Books, 2019
11. One Last Lie, Minotaur Books, 2020
12. Dead by Dawn, Minotaur Books, 2021
13. Hatchet Island, Minotaur Books, 2022
14. Dead Man’s Wake, Minotaur Books, 2023
15. Pitch Dark, Minotaur Books, 2024
16. Skin and Bones and Other Mike Bowditch Short Stories, Minotaur Books, 2025
17. Storm Tide, Minotaur Books, 2026

=== Mike Bowditch Short Stories ===
1. "The Bear Trap", Minotaur Books, 2014
2. "Rabid", Minotaur Books, 2018
3. "Backtrack", Minotaur Books, 2019
4. "The Imposter", Minotaur Books, 2020
5. "The Caretaker", Minotaur Books, 2021
6. "Skin and Bones", Minotaur Books, 2022
7. "Snakebit", Minotaur Books, 2023
8. "Blaze Orange", Minotaur Books, 2026
