= Michael Palmer (novelist) =

American novelist (1943–2013)

Michael Stephen Palmer
- Born: October 9, 1943; Springfield, Massachusetts, U.S.
- Died: October 30, 2013 (aged 70); New York City, U.S.
- Education: Wesleyan University; Case Western Reserve University
- Occupations: Physician, author
- Employer: Massachusetts Medical Society
- Spouse(s): Judith Grass (divorced); Noelle Shaughnessy (divorced)
- Children: 3

Michael Stephen Palmer, M.D. (October 9, 1943 – October 30, 2013), was an American physician and author. His novels are often referred to as medical thrillers. Some of his novels have made The New York Times Best Seller list and have been translated into 35 languages. One, Extreme Measures (1991), was adapted into a 1996 film of the same name starring Hugh Grant, Sarah Jessica Parker, and Gene Hackman.

== Biography ==
Michael Stephen Palmer was born in Springfield, Massachusetts, on October 9, 1942, to Milton and May Palmer. He grew up with two younger sisters, Donna and Susan. Palmer graduated from Wesleyan University in 1964 with a pre-med major, and with "sort of a Russian minor". He then went to Case Western Reserve University for medical school. Palmer trained in internal medicine at Boston City Hospital and Massachusetts General Hospital.

Palmer once claimed he never wanted to be a writer. He did not think he had much "flair" for it, even though he read in his spare time. In 1978, he read Robin Cook's medical thriller Coma (1977). Palmer thought if Cook, also a Wesleyan graduate, could write a novel, then he could too. When not writing, he worked part-time at Massachusetts Medical Society. Before he began work on his first published novel, The Sisterhood, about euthanasia, Palmer was practicing treatment of drug addiction.

Side Effects (1985), his second published work, was about the testing of unapproved drugs on a patient in Nazi Germany, but his most famous novel proved to be Extreme Measures (1991), in which a promising young doctor is threatened by a hospital elite after discovering the body's criminal acts. A selection of his other books include: Natural Causes (1994), about a holistic doctor who prescribes medicine that actually kills patients; Miracle Cure (1998), about a drug for heart disease that actually is very dangerous because of its side effects; and Extreme Measures (1991) on which the eponymous 1996 thriller film starring Hugh Grant, Sarah Jessica Parker, and Gene Hackman is based.

Palmer married Judith Grass and Noelle Shaughnessy with both marriages ending in divorce. He had three sons—Matthew, Daniel, and Luke. On October 29, 2013, Palmer unexpectedly suffered a heart attack and stroke, dying the next day in New York City. A tribute trail was dedicated to his memory at Red Run Stream Valley Trail in November 2013.

== Novels ==
- The Sisterhood (1982)
- Side Effects (1985)
- Flashback (1988)
- Extreme Measures (1991)
- Natural Causes (1994)
- Silent Treatment (1995)
- Critical Judgment (1996)
- Miracle Cure (1998)
- The Patient (2000)
- Fatal (2002)
- The Society (2004)
- The Fifth Vial (2007)
- The First Patient (2008)
- The Second Opinion (2009)
- The Last Surgeon (2010)
- A Heartbeat Away (2011)
- The Deal (2013)
- Dr. Lou Welcome series:
  - 1 Oath of Office (2012)
  - 1.5 On Call (novella) (2012)
  - 2 Political Suicide (2013)
  - 3 Resistant (2014)
- Trauma (2015, with Daniel Palmer)
- Mercy (2016, with Daniel Palmer)
- The First Family (2018, with Daniel Palmer)
