= Michael Koryta =

American novelist

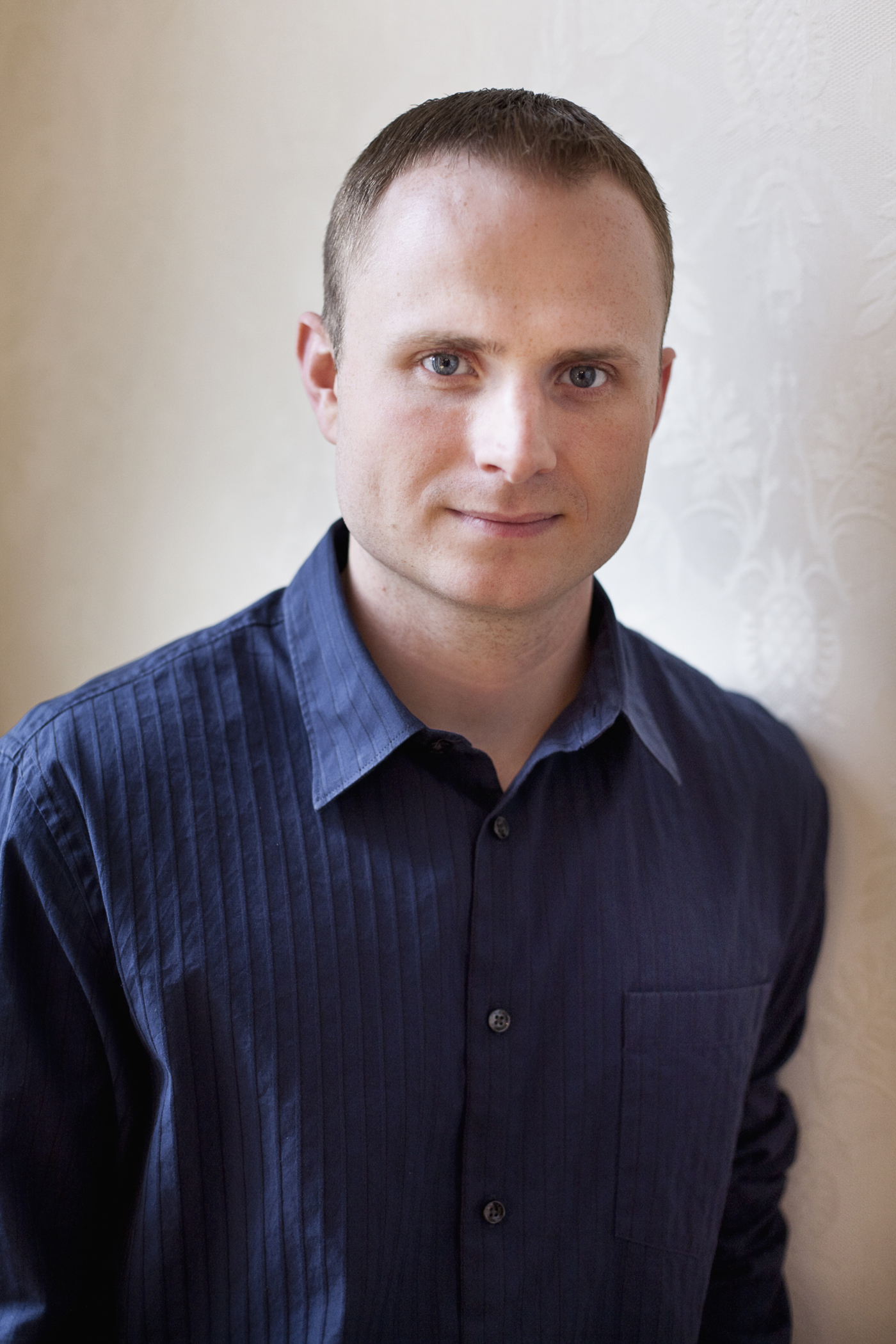
- Koryta in 2010
- Born: September 20, 1982 (age 43); Bloomington, Indiana, U.S.
- Education: Indiana University Bloomington
- Occupation: Novelist
- Writing career
- Genres: Crime, Supernatural
- Website: www.michaelkoryta.com

Michael Koryta (pronounced ko-ree-ta) (born September 20, 1982) is an American author of contemporary crime and supernatural fiction. His novels have appeared on The New York Times Best Seller list, and have won or been nominated for prizes and awards such as the Los Angeles Times Book Prize, the Edgar Award, the Shamus Award, the Barry Award, the Quill Award, and the International Thriller Writers Awards.

In addition to winning the Los Angeles Times Book Prize, his novel Envy the Night was selected as a Reader's Digest Condensed Book. His work has been translated into more than twenty languages. A former private investigator and newspaper reporter, Koryta graduated from Indiana University Bloomington in 2006 with a bachelor of arts in criminal justice.

In 2008, Koryta was honored with the Outstanding Young Alumni Award by Indiana University.

== Career ==
Michael Koryta began writing at a very early age. As an eight-year-old boy, he wrote to his favorite writers, and by the age of sixteen he had decided he wanted to become a crime novelist. His novel Tonight I Said Goodbye won the St. Martin's Press/Private Eye Writers of America Best First Novel prize.

Many of Koryta's novels have been optioned for potential film or television production. The first to make it to the screen is Taylor Sheridan's adaptation of Those Who Wish Me Dead.

== Personal life ==
He lives in St. Petersburg, Florida, and Bloomington, Indiana. Koryta was born and raised in Bloomington. He graduated from Bloomington High School North.

== Bibliography ==
=== The Lincoln Perry series ===
- Tonight I Said Goodbye (2004)
- Sorrow's Anthem (2006)
- A Welcome Grave (2007)
- The Silent Hour (2009)

=== The Markus Novak series ===
- Last Words (2015)
- Rise the Dark (2016)

=== Other novels ===
- Envy the Night (2008)
- So Cold the River (2010)
- The Cypress House (2011)
- The Ridge (2011)
- The Prophet (2012)
- Those Who Wish Me Dead (2014)
- How It Happened (2018)
- If She Wakes (2019)
- The Chill (2020) (writing as Scott Carson)
- Never Far Away (2021)
- Where They Wait (2021) (writing as Scott Carson)
- An Honest Man (2023)
- Lost Man's Lane (2024) (writing as Scott Carson)
- Departure 37 (2025) (writing as Scott Carson)
