= Rose Connors =

American writer

- Education: Mount St. Mary's College
- Occupation: Author
- Writing career
- Genre: Mystery fiction
- Notable awards: Mary Higgins Clark Award (2003)

Rose Connors is an American author of mystery fiction. She has written four books about her fictional attorney Marty Nickerson, but hasn't been published since 2005. She graduated from Mount St. Mary's College with a degree in American history.

== Works ==
Marty Nickerson Series

1. Absolute Certainty (2002), won the Mary Higgins Clark Award
2. Temporary Sanity (2003)
3. Maximum Security (2004)
4. False Testimony (2005)
