= Diane Chamberlain =

American author of adult fiction

- Born: United States
- Occupation: Novelist
- Writing career
- Period: 1990-present
- Notable work: Private Relations
- Notable awards: RITA award – Single Title Contemporary Romance; 1990 Private Relations
- Website: dianechamberlain.com

Diane Chamberlain is an American author of adult fiction. Chamberlain is in the New York Times, USA Today and Sunday Times lists of bestselling authors, having published 30 novels in more than twenty languages.

== Novels ==
- 1989 – Private Relations
- 1990 – Lovers and Strangers
- 1991 – Secret Lives
- 1992 – Keeper of the Light
- 1993 – Fire and Rain
- 1995 – Brass Ring
- 1996 – Reflection
- 1997 – The Escape Artist
- 1999 – Breaking the Silence (aka Remembering Me)
- 1999 – Summer’s Child
- 2001 – The Courage Tree
- 2002 – Cypress Point (aka The Shadow Wife) (aka The Forgotten Son)
- 2003 – Kiss River
- 2004 – Her Mother’s Shadow
- 2005 – The Bay at Midnight
- 2005 – "The Dreamer" (short story in anthology The Journey Home)
- 2006 – The Secret Life of CeeCee Wilkes (aka A Beautiful Lie) (aka The Lost Daughter)
- 2008 - Before the Storm
- 2009 - Secrets She Left Behind
- 2010 - The Lies We Told
- 2011 - The Midwife's Confession
- 2012 - The Good Father
- 2013 - "The First Lie" (e-short story)
- 2013 - Necessary Lies
- 2013 - "The Broken String" (e-short story)
- 2014 - The Silent Sister
- 2015 - "The Dance Begins" (e-short story)
- 2015 - Pretending to Dance
- 2017 - The Stolen Marriage
- 2018 - The Dream Daughter
- 2020 - Big Lies in a Small Town
- 2021 - The Last House on the Street

== Awards and reception ==
- 1990 - Romance Writers of America RITA Award, Single Title Contemporary Romance – Private Relations
