= Pandora's Clock =

- Also known as: Pandora's Clock
- Genre: Action; Drama; Thriller
- Based on: Pandora's Clock by John J. Nance
- Written by: David Israel
- Directed by: Eric Laneuville
- Starring: Richard Dean Anderson; Stephen Root; Jane Leeves; Robert Loggia; Daphne Zuniga
- Theme music composer: Don Davis
- Country of origin: United States
- Original language: English

Production
- Executive producer: David R. Ginsburg
- Producer: Michael O. Gallant
- Production location: Seattle
- Editor: Stephen Lovejoy
- Running time: 176 mins.
- Production companies: Citadel Entertainment; Comsky Group; NBC Enterprises

Original release
- Network: NBC
- Release: November 10 – November 11, 1996

Pandora's Clock (also known as Doomsday Virus) is a 1996 NBC miniseries based on a novel by John J. Nance about a deadly virus on a Boeing 747-200 from Frankfurt to John F. Kennedy International Airport. Directed by Eric Laneuville, the film stars Richard Dean Anderson, Stephen Root, Jane Leeves, Robert Loggia and Daphne Zuniga and the script closely follows the book.

== Plot ==
The story begins in the mountains of Bavaria, Germany, where wildlife documentarian Ernest Helms (Michael Winters) is filming local wildlife. While filming, he discovers a man attempting to break into his rental car. After foiling the man's attempt, Helms prepares to drive away but is thwarted by the man smashing the driver's window. Helms, however, succeeds in escaping the crazed man, but receives a minor cut on his hand.

A few days later, in Frankfurt, Captain James Holland (Richard Dean Anderson), amidst preparations for his forthcoming transatlantic flight as Captain of Quantum Airlines Flight 66, is told by his doctor he does not have cancer. On board Flight 66, a Boeing 747-200, Helms (already displaying signs of illness) is assisted to his seat by flight attendant Brenda Hopkins (Kate Hodge). Shortly after takeoff, Helms rises from his seat and falls into cardiac arrest, and Brenda gives him CPR. Head flight attendant Barb Rollins (Jennifer Savidge) notifies Holland of the emergency, and the Captain and his check pilot, Daniel Robb (Richard Lawson) set a course for London's Heathrow Airport,. However they are turned away when British Air-Traffic Control informs them that one of the passengers (Helms) could be infected with a deadly strain of influenza.

Several harrowing events follow. The U.S. President (Edward Herrmann) unsuccessfully tries to sneak Flight 66 into RAF Mildenhall, disguised as a United States Air Force fighter plane and guided in by another, despite a recommendation otherwise by Ambassador Lee Lancaster (Robert Guillaume), but the British forces at the base jam the runway with emergency vehicles. Holland threatens to land anyway, only to pull up at the last minute, showing the U.S. Government how desperate the situation is. Soon thereafter, an investigation is set in motion by the Central Intelligence Agency. Flight 66 lands at the U.S. air base in Iceland, but one passenger is so distraught at being separated from her child and at being in quarantine that she runs down the airplane stairs and is shot and killed by U.S. troops in MOPP gear. Holland flies the aircraft toward Mauritania, but an intelligence agent warns Holland that an assassin is trying to destroy the flight. Holland tricks the assassin (in a missile-armed Learjet 35) into crashing and lands on Ascension Island.

The book mentions that the virus becomes less lethal and enters the human population. The movie indicates that the flight attendant who gave Helms CPR died six months after the incident, presumably from the virus.

== Cast ==
- Richard Dean Anderson as Captain James Holland
- Robert Guillaume as Ambassador Lee Lancaster
- Edward Herrmann as President of the United States Ersin
- Kate Hodge as Brenda Hopkins
- Jane Leeves as Rachel Sherwood
- Richard Lawson as Captain Daniel Robb
- Robert Loggia as CIA Director Jonathan Roth
- Stephen Root as Mark Hastings
- Vladimir Kulich as Yuri, The Terrorist
- Daphne Zuniga as Dr. Roni Sanders
- John Considine as Dr. Turnheir
- Grant Goodeve as Don Moses
- Wolf Muser as Dr. Zeitner
- John J. Nance as Air Force Chief
- Penny Peyser as Lisa Erickson

== Reception ==
The first part received a 16.5 rating and 24% share of the audience, NBC's best November miniseries performance since Billionaire Boys Club in 1987.

== Award nominations ==
Year	Award	Result	Category	Recipient
1997	Young Artist Awards	Nominated	Best Performance in a Drama Series - Guest Starring Young Actress	Teru McDonald
1997	ASC Award	Nominated	Outstanding Achievement in Cinematography in Mini-Series	Steven Shaw
