= Sarah Addison Allen =

American author

- Born: Asheville, North Carolina, U.S.
- Education: University of North Carolina at Asheville
- Occupation: Author
- Writing career
- Pen name: Katie Gallagher
- Language: English
- Genres: Fiction, Romance, Magical Realism
- Notable work: Garden Spells
- Notable awards: 2008 SIBA Book Award for fiction; Best Women's Fiction of 2007 by the American Library Association's Reading List.; 2008 RT Reviewers Choice Award for Women's Fiction; 2015 Goodman Endowed Artist
- Website: www.sarahaddisonallen.com

Sarah Addison Allen (also known by the pen name Katie Gallagher) is an American and New York Times bestselling author.

== Biography ==
Born and raised in Asheville, North Carolina, Allen attended the University of North Carolina at Asheville and graduated with a degree in literature.

After graduation, her big break occurred in 2007 with the publication of her first mainstream novel, Garden Spells, a modern-day fairy tale about an enchanted apple tree and the family of North Carolina women who tend it. Booklist called Sarah's accomplished debut "spellbindingly charming." The novel became a Barnes & Noble Recommends selection and a New York Times Bestseller.

After publishing four bestselling books in five years, Allen took a break from writing when she was diagnosed with late-stage breast cancer in early 2011 at age 39. She is now in remission and returned to writing with her 2014 bestseller, Lost Lake. In 2015, she revisited the setting of her first book with First Frost, which continues the story of the Waverly sisters from Garden Spells.

When asked about her writing process, she said, "I start with a loose storyline, then see where it goes." Her books have been translated into 30 languages and sold nearly 2 million copies.

== Awards ==
Allen has won numerous awards for her work including; 2008 SIBA Book Award for fiction for her novel Garden Spells, Best Women's Fiction of 2007 by the American Library Association's Reading List, 2008 RT Reviewers Choice Award for Women's Fiction for her novel The Sugar Queen, and the Department of Literature at UNC Asheville named Addison the 2015 Goodman Endowed Artist.

== Bibliography ==
- Garden Spells (2007)
- The Sugar Queen (2008)
- The Girl Who Chased the Moon (2010)
- The Peach Keeper (2011)
- Lost Lake (2014)
- First Frost (2015)
- Other Birds (2022)

=== As Katie Gallagher ===
- Tried and True (2003)
