= Patrick Taylor (author) =

Irish academic & author (born 1941)

- Born: 1941 (age 84–85); Bangor, Northern Ireland

Patrick Taylor is a retired medical researcher, professor emeritus at the University of British Columbia, and best-selling novelist.

== Biography ==
Born in 1941 and brought up in Bangor, Northern Ireland, Taylor studied and practiced medicine in Belfast and rural Ulster before immigrating to Canada in 1970 to work in the field of human infertility. From 1987 to 1989 he worked at the Bourn Hall Fertility Clinic in association with 2010 Nobel laureate Sir Robert Edwards. Taylor has received three lifetime achievement awards including the Lifetime Award of Excellence in Reproductive Medicine of the Canadian Fertility and Andrology Society.

He has written or contributed to 170 academic papers and six textbooks and also served as editor-in-chief of the Canadian Obstetrics and Gynaecology Journal, as well as writing several medical humour columns and serving as book reviewer for Stitches: The Journal of Medical Humour.

Taylor has published more than fifteen works of creative writing, all set in Northern Ireland. He is best known for his Irish Country series, several of which have been international bestsellers, particularly in Canada, where Taylor has resided since 1970.

An earlier work, written with TF Baskett, titled The Complete Anthology of En Passant 1989-1999, is a collection of their shared humour columns.

Taylor now lives on Salt Spring Island, BC, Canada.

== Books ==
=== Fiction ===
==== The Irish Troubles series ====
1. Only Wounded: Ulster Stories (1997)
2. Now and in the Hour of Our Death (2005)
3. Pray for Us Sinners (2000)

==== The Irish Country series ====
1. An Irish Country Doctor (2004)
2. An Irish Country Village (2008)
3. An Irish Country Christmas (2008)
4. An Irish Country Girl (2009)
5. An Irish Country Courtship (2010)
6. A Dublin Student Doctor (2011)
7. An Irish Country Wedding (2012)
8. Fingal O'Reilly: Irish Doctor (2013)
9. Home Is the Sailor (2013)
10. An Irish Doctor in Peace and at War (2014)
11. The Wily O'Reilly (2014)
12. An Irish Doctor in Love and at Sea (2015)
13. An Irish Country Love Story (2016)
14. An Irish Country Practice (2017)
15. An Irish Country Cottage (2018)
16. An Irish Country Family (2019)
17. An Irish Country Welcome (2020)
18. An Irish Country Yuletide (2021)

=== NonFiction ===
1. An Irish Country Cookbook (2017)

=== Nonfiction ===
- The Complete Anthology of En Passant 1989-1999 (with T.F. Baskett)
