= William G. Tapply =

American writer

- Born: July 16, 1940; Waltham, Massachusetts, U.S.
- Died: July 28, 2009 (aged 69); Hancock, New Hampshire, U.S.
- Education: Amherst College (BA); Harvard University (M.A.T.)
- Occupations: Writer; mystery novelist; professor
- Spouse: Vicki Stiefel
- Children: 5
- Writing career
- Genre: Legal thriller

William G. Tapply (July 16, 1940 – July 28, 2009) was an American writer who published over 40 works. He is best known for his legal mystery series featuring lawyer and detective Brady Coyne, and he also wrote about one of his favorite pastimes, fishing.

Tapply was born, raised, and lived in New England. He was a high school teacher and a college professor.

== Early life and education ==
Tapply was born in Waltham, Massachusetts, and raised in Lexington by his father, H.G. Tapply, and his mother, Muriel. Tapply's father wrote the column "Tap's Tips" for Field & Stream.

Tapply graduated from Lexington High School. He earned a bachelor's in American studies from Amherst College in 1962 and received a master's in teaching from Harvard.

== Career ==
Tapply published over 40 books in his 25-year career. Over half of his books featured lawyer detective Brady Coyne in a mystery series. Tapply also published essays and books about fishing, and, like his father, wrote for Field & Stream. In addition to his non-fiction about fishing, Tapply published a short series of mysteries in which the protagonist was a Maine fishing guide.

Tapply's first Coyne mystery, Death at Charity's Point, was published in 1984. Tapply described Coyne as "a lawyer with Brahmin clients who always wanted to keep the police out of it." Coyne, like his creator, was an avid trout fisherman. Writing about Tight Lines (1992), one of the Coyne mysteries, a reviewer said, "Brady is as appealing a character as ever". Reviewing Scar Tissue (2003), the 17th Coyne mystery, a critic stated: "Like a well-worn, comfortable pair of shoes or a favorite old college sweat shirt, William G. Tapply and Brady Coyne just don't disappoint."

Tapply also wrote other kinds of fiction, including The Nomination, his last novel, published after his death. One reviewer described The Nomination as a "fascinating political thriller".

Before becoming a full-time writer, Tapply was a school teacher and administrator at his alma mater, Lexington High School. He also taught at Emerson College and was an English professor at Clark University in Worcester, Massachusetts. According to the owner of Kate's Mystery Books in Cambridge, Massachusetts, Tapply "helped young writers a lot and was a wonderful teacher." Tapply wrote The Elements of Mystery Fiction (2004), a book that describes the process of writing and publishing mysteries.

Tapply's final Coyne mystery, Outwitting Trolls, was published in 2010, a year after his death.

== Awards and honors ==
Death at Charity's Point (1984), Tapply's first mystery novel, won the Scribner Crime Novel Award.

== Personal life ==
Tapply was married to editor and mystery writer Vicki Stiefel and had five children. Tapply met Stiefel at a writer's group in 1992. Stiefel said that Tapply "helped a lot with my writing. He's a terrific teacher."

Tapply died on July 28, 2009, from leukemia at his farm in Hancock, New Hampshire.

== Bibliography ==
=== The Brady Coyne Mysteries ===
- Death a Charity's Point (1984)
- The Dutch Blue Error
- Follow the Sharks
- The Marine Corpse (1986)
- Dead Meat (1987)
- The Vulgar Boatman
- A Void in Hearts
- Dead Winter
- Client Privilege
- Spotted Cats
- Tight Lines
- The Snake Eater
- The Seventh Enemy
- Close to the Bone
- Cutter's Run
- Muscle Memory
- Scar Tissue
- Past Tense (2001)
- A Fine Line
- Shadow of Death
- Nervous Water
- Out Cold
- One-Way Ticket
- Hell Bent (2008)
- Outwitting Trolls (2010) - published posthumously

=== Stoney Calhoun series ===
- unknown first book in series
- Gray Ghost (2007)
- Dark Tiger (2009)

=== J.W. Jackson and Brady Coyne series ===
- First Light, co-written with Philip R. Craig (2001)
- Second Sight, co-written with Philip R. Craig (2005)
- Third Strike, co-written with Philip R. Craig (2007)

=== Fishing books ===
- Those Hours Spent Outdoors: Reflections on Hunting and Fishing (1990)
- Home Water: Near and Far: A Fly Fisherman's Explorations (1992)
- A Fly Fishing Life (1997)
- Pocket Water: Confessions of a Restless Angler (2001)
- Gone Fishin': Ruminations of Fly Fishing (2004)
- Trout Eyes: True Tales of Adventure, Travel, and Fly Fishing (2015)

=== Other books ===
- The Elements of Mystery Fiction
