= Sheila Roberts (American writer) =

American novelist

Sheila Roberts (born February 26, 1951, in Seattle, Washington, USA) is an American author of women's fiction and romance. As Sheila Rabe, she writes contemporary and historical romance novels.

Her books often appear as Reader's Digest Condensed Books. Her novel Angel Lane was named one of Amazon's top ten romances in 2009. Her novel The Nine Lives of Christmas is now a Hallmark movie. Her book On Strike for Christmas was adapted into a television movie by Lifetime.

== Bibliography ==
=== As Sheila Roberts ===
- On Strike for Christmas, St. Martin’s Press, 2007
- Bikini Season, St. Martin’s Press, 2008
- Angel Lane, St. Martin’s Press, 2009
- Love in Bloom, St. Martin’s Press, 2009
- Small Change, St. Martin’s Press, 2010
- The Snow Globe, St. Martin’s Press, 2010
- The Nine Lives of Christmas, St. Martin’s Press, 2011

=== Life in Icicle Falls Series ===
- Better Than Chocolate, Harlequin MIRA, 2012
- Merry Ex-Mas, Harlequin MIRA, 2013
- What She Wants, Harlequin MIRA, 2013
- The Cottage on Juniper Ridge, Harlequin MIRA, 2014
- The Tea Shop on Lavender Lane, Harlequin MIRA, 2014
- The Lodge on Holly Road, Harlequin MIRA, 2014
- A Wedding on Primrose Street, Harlequin MIRA, 2015
- Christmas on Candy Cane Lane, Harlequin MIRA, 2015
- Welcome to Icicle Falls, Harlequin MIRA, 2015
- Home on Apple Blossom Road, Harlequin MIRA, 2016
- Starting Over on Blackberry Lane, Harlequin MIRA, 2017
- Christmas in Icicle Falls, Harlequin MIRA, 2017

=== Moonlight Harbor Series ===
- Welcome to Moonlight Harbor, Harlequin MIRA, 2018

=== As Sheila Rabe ===
- The Light-Fingered Lady, Pageant Books, 1989
- Faint Heart, Diamond Books, 1990
- Ghostly Charade, Zebra Books, 1991
- The Improper Miss Prym, Diamond Books, 1991
- Lady Luck, Diamond Books, 1992
- The Lost Heir, Diamond Books, 1992
- The Wedding Deception, Diamond Books, 1993
- The Accidental Bride, Zebra, 1994
- Bringing Out Betsy, Zebra, 1994
- Miss Plympton's Peril, Jove Books, 1994
- An Innocent Imposter, Zebra, 1995
- The Adventuress, Zebra, 1996
- All I Want for Christmas, Jove, 2000
- Be My Valentine, Jove, 2001
- A Prince of a Guy, Berkley Books, 2001
