= Louisa Leaman =

British writer (born 1976)

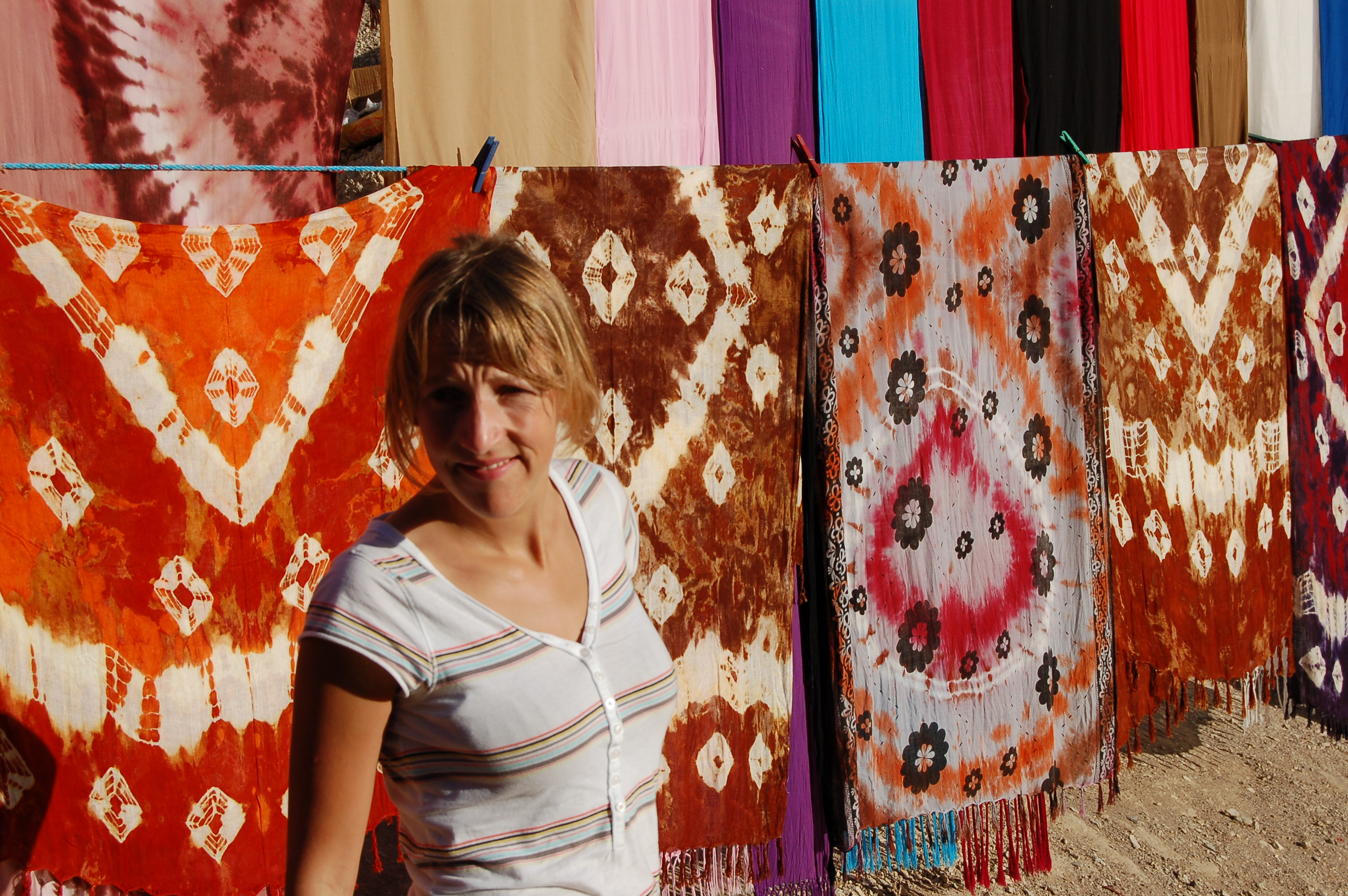
Louisa Leaman in Tunisia, 2006

Louisa Leaman (born 24 June 1976) is a London-based author. Her debut novel, The Perfect Dress, published by Penguin Random House, is an uplifting contemporary romance about vintage wedding dresses, inspired by her work researching and writing for the Victoria & Albert Museum. In the US it is titled The Second Chance Boutique and is published by Sourcebooks. It is also published in Germany, Italy and Spain. Leaman's second novel, Meant To Be, published in October 2020, features a charmed antique necklace that leads its owner to their true love.

== Early life ==
Louisa was born on 24 June 1976 and grew up in Loughton, Essex. She was educated at Bancroft's School, Woodford Green, then attended Leeds University, where she studied Art History followed by a PGCE teaching qualification in Secondary Art & Design.

== Career ==
In 2004 Louisa won a writing competition in the Times Educational Supplement. This led to a publishing deal with Continuum International Publishing), for whom she wrote five teaching/behaviour management guides. As an experienced teacher and behaviour consultant, she delivered teacher training throughout the UK, mainly based on her book Managing Very Challenging Behaviour.

Louisa has written for Hachette Children's Books, with titles including The Garden and Born Free Elephant Rescue: The True Story of Nina and Pinkie, based on The Born Free Foundation's dramatic rescue of orphaned elephants. The book describes the story of Nina the African elephant, who was released into the wild after decades of captivity. Nina's story was also televised by the BBC, in a documentary featuring British actor, Martin Clunes, called Born to be Wild. Louisa has also contributed to many journals, magazines and newspapers, including The Guardian, The Observer, and The Independent. She wrote a weekly column for the Times Education Supplement Magazine and a column for the Guardian-Series newspaper about motherhood.

== Bibliography ==
- Leaman, L. (2005). Managing Very Challenging Behaviour. Continuum International Publishing. ISBN 0-8264-8539-1
- Leaman, L. (2005). Classroom Confidential. Continuum International Publishing. ISBN 0-8264-8541-3
- Leaman, L. (2006). The Naked Teacher. Continuum International Publishing. ISBN 0-8264-8540-5
- Leaman, L. (2007). Dictionary of Disruption. Continuum International Publishing. ISBN 978-0-8264-9466-5
- Leaman, L. (2008). The Perfect Teacher. Continuum International Publishing. ISBN 978-0-8264-9787-1
