= Sarah Jio =

American writer

- Born: Sarah Mitchell; February 18, 1978 (age 48); Seattle, Washington, U.S.
- Education: Western Washington University (BA)
- Occupations: Journalist; Author
- Website: sarahjio.com

Sarah Jio (born February 18, 1978) is an American journalist and New York Times bestselling author of 11 novels.

== Early life and education ==
Jio was born on February 18, 1978, in Seattle, Washington. She began writing as a child and was the first teenage columnist for her local newspaper, The Bremerton Sun. Later, Jio earned a bachelor's degree in journalism from Western Washington University.

== Career ==
Jio started her career in 2000 as an account executive at The Silver Company before becoming an editor at Seattle Pacific University, where she worked for ten years. Simultaneously she also worked as a freelance writer contributing articles on topics covering travel, nutrition, food, health and psychology to many national magazines and newspapers.

In 2008, Jio became a contributor to Glamour magazine, where she penned the publication's popular health blog, "Vitamin G", and later wrote a weekly column about her life after divorce.

In 2010, Jio signed with Penguin Random House, and has since published 11 novels with this international publishing company including the New York Times and USA Today bestseller, Blackberry Winter. Her novels are published in more than 30 countries worldwide and have been translated into dozens of languages. Jio is also a frequent contributor to the actress Molly Sims' lifestyle website.

== Books ==
- Jio, Sarah. With Love from London. Ballantine Books. Retrieved 15 April 2024.
- Jio, Sarah. The Violets of March. New York.
- Jio, Sarah. The bungalow : a novel. New York: Plume. ISBN 0452297672.
- Jio, Sarah. Blackberry winter : a novel. New York: Plume. ISBN 0452298385.
- Jio, Sarah. The last camellia : a novel. New York. ISBN 0452298393.
- Jio, Sarah. Morning Glory. ISBN 8131758702.
- Jio, Sarah. Goodnight June : a novel. New York. ISBN 0142180211.
- Jio, Sarah. The look of love : a novel. New York, New York. ISBN 014218053X.
- Jio, Sarah. All the flowers in Paris : a novel (First ed.). New York. ISBN 110188505X.
- Jio, Sarah. Always : a novel (Ballantine trade paperback ed.). New York. ISBN 1101885041.

== Personal life ==
Jio currently lives in Seattle with her husband, Brandon Ebel, the founder of Tooth and Nail Records and her three sons and three step children.
