= Those Who Wish Me Dead (novel) =

2014 novel by Michael Koryta

- First edition hardcover
- Author: Michael Koryta
- Language: English
- Genre: Crime fiction, mystery
- Publisher: Little, Brown and Company
- Publication date: June 3, 2014
- Publication place: United States
- Media type: Print (hardback, paperback), e-book, audiobook
- Pages: 400
- ISBN: 978-0316122559

Those Who Wish Me Dead is a novel by American author Michael Koryta. It was published in the United States in June 2014 by Little, Brown and Company. It was adapted as a film released in 2021 of the same name and starring Angelina Jolie.

== Plot ==
After Indiana teenager Jace Wilson witnesses a murder, his parents cannot put him into witness protection because the killers have connections in law enforcement. So they entrust Jace's safety to Ethan and Allison Serbin, a couple who run a wilderness survival program for troubled kids in Montana. The murderers, Jack and Patrick Blackwell, track Jace—now using the name Connor Reynolds—to the mountainous region. When Jace realizes they're closing in, Ethan and Jace take off into the wilderness. As a forest fire rages and a fierce electrical storm approaches, Connor meets Hannah Faber, a former smokejumper who is now a lookout in an isolated fire tower. Having failed to save a young boy previously, Hannah vows to keep him safe.

== Characters ==
- Jace Wilson / Connor Reynolds
- Ethan Serbin
- Allison Serbin
- Jack Blackwell
- Patrick Blackwell
- Hannah Faber
- Jamie Bennett

== Reception ==
Janet Maslin of The New York Times wrote: "The summer of 2014 brings Those Who Wish Me Dead, a lean, propulsive action-adventure thriller with a raging forest fire as its backdrop and with much more finesse than that description might suggest. The ingenious tricks and conversational wit of Those Who Wish Me Dead don’t usually come with this territory."

Library Journal's starred review said: "The Blackwell brothers' devious methods, the fire raging across the mountains, and the actions of those trying to save Jace will keep readers up well into the night."

Kirkus Reviews wrote: "Having joined the ranks of the very best thriller writers with his small-town masterpiece, The Prophet (2012), Koryta matches that effort with a book of sometimes-unbearable tension. With the exception of one plot turn you'll likely see coming from a mountain pass away, this novel is brilliantly orchestrated. Also crucial to its success is Koryta's mastery of the beautiful but threatening setting, including a mountain fire's ability to electrify the ground, radiate a lethal force field—and create otherworldly light shows. Summer reading doesn't get better than this."

NPR's Madhulika Sikka wrote: "If you're looking for formulaic thrills and spills, then this is not your book. But if you want an elegantly written, taut thriller with an amazing sense of place, then look no further."
