= Blue Heaven (Box novel) =

2008 novel by C. J. Box

- First edition
- Author: C.J. Box
- Language: English
- Genre: Fiction
- Publisher: Minotaur
- Publication date: 2008
- Publication place: United States
- Media type: Print (hardback & paperback)
- Pages: 384
- ISBN: 978-0-312-36571-4
- Preceded by: Free Fire
- Followed by: Three Weeks to Say Goodbye

Blue Heaven (2008) is a stand-alone novel by author C.J. Box, known for his popular Joe Pickett crime novels. It was published by Minotaur Books, an imprint of St. Martin's Press, and won the Edgar Award for Best Novel in 2009.
