= Garden Spells =

2007 novel by Sarah Addison Allen

- Author: Sarah Addison Allen
- Language: English
- Genre: Fiction
- Publisher: Bantam Books
- Publication date: 2007
- Publication place: USA
- Media type: Print (hardback)
- Pages: 304
- ISBN: 0553805487

Garden Spells is a 2007 novel by Sarah Addison Allen. It tells the story of lonely Claire Waverley after her long-lost sister Sydney comes back to town after being gone for over ten years.

== Plot ==
Claire Waverley lives alone in small Bascom, North Carolina. The only person she's close to is an elderly relative named Evanelle, who has the gift of giving people exactly what they need before they need it. Claire runs a successful catering business based around edible flowers, and refuses to let anyone into her life. Her neighbor, Tyler Hughes, is interested in her but she acts cold towards him.

Claire has an apple tree in her garden with a special power; anyone who eats an apple from it sees what the biggest event in their life will be. Half the town wants to get to the tree and eat an apple, but Claire buries every apple as it falls to prevent people from seeing bad things.

Across the country in Seattle, Washington, Claire's sister Sydney and her five-year-old daughter Bay escape from David, Sydney's abusive boyfriend and Bay's father, and head to Bascom. They arrive out of the blue and shock Claire, who hasn't seen Sydney in ten years and has no idea she has a daughter.

Claire hires Sydney to help out with the catering, and as luck would have it Sydney's first assignment is serving at a party being thrown by her old boyfriend Hunter John Matteson and his wife Emma. It turns out that Emma's mother Ariel Clark set the situation up to try to show Hunter John that Sydney was trash, and Claire was unaware of her motives.

Sydney calls Tyler to come get her, and Claire changes the food so the people attending the party feel remorse for how they treated Sydney. Many of them call Sydney and apologize for their bad behavior.

Sydney had attended beauty school at one point, and she rents a booth at the local hair salon, but has no customers until Claire has Sydney cut her hair off into a very flattering style.

Sydney runs into her old friend Henry, who she had shunned in high school after playing with him every day in grade school. He invites her and Bay out to see his dairy farm, and they stay for several hours. When they get home, Claire is in a panic because she thinks she's been abandoned.

On the Fourth of July, Claire sets up a booth on the green and gives away honeysuckle wine. Tyler catches her alone, and they kiss before Claire breaks free and drives home in a panic.

Later Claire takes Tyler several casseroles which are intended to make him uninterested in her, but they don't work on him. Instead, he gets more attracted to her, even though an old girlfriend comes to stay with him for several days. Despite herself, Claire finds herself drawn to Tyler, and they make love in her garden.

Sydney and Henry go on a date to the town reservoir, and take Claire and Bay along. At the last minute, they invite Tyler along as well. They all have an enjoyable time, but the town gossips, namely Ariel Clark and her friends, tell everyone about it and say Claire is acting like a teenager, even though she's thirty-six.

Claire and Sydney decide to throw a party and invite Evanelle, Henry and Tyler. Evanelle arrives early and reveals to Claire and Sydney that their mother ate an apple from their tree many years earlier, and most likely saw the car accident in which she was to die. Evanelle believes that this explains their mother's wild behavior.

Henry and Tyler arrive, and they are settling down to eat dinner when Bay's father David arrives, carrying a gun. He shoots Henry in the shoulder and goes after Sydney. Bay runs behind the apple tree and an apple flies out at David's feet. He bites into it and evidently sees something horrible, probably his own death. He runs off, to the relief of everyone but Tyler, who doesn't know about the legendary power of the apple tree.

When Claire explains to Tyler what must have happened, he tells her that he ate an apple and didn't run off screaming into the night. All he saw was Claire in her garden.

The book ends with Bay lying beneath the apple tree, recreating a dream she had about being in the garden.

== Characters ==
- Claire Waverley, a lonely caterer. Claire has built up a successful business, but is shy and wary of people due to being abandoned by her mother at a young age.
- Sydney Waverley, Claire's younger, wild sister. Sydney left Bascom behind after her high school graduation and never wanted to go back.
- Bay Waverley, Sydney's five-year-old daughter. Bay has a dream of being in Claire's garden long before she actually sees it.
- Tyler Hughes, a neighbor. Tyler has a romantic interest in Claire, but she's dismissive of him because she's afraid he'll leave her like almost everyone else has. Tyler is a professor at the local college in Bascom and meets Claire at a faculty dinner she catered.
- Evanelle Waverley, an elderly relative. Evanelle has the gift of giving people exactly what they need before they need it—a flashlight before a power outage, or a jar of cherries before they decide to have ice cream sundaes.
- Hunter John Matteson, Sydney's boyfriend during high school.
- Emma Matteson, Hunter John's jealous wife.
- Ariel Clark, Emma's scheming mother.
