= Susan Wilson =

American author

Susan Wilson is a New York Times best selling American author. Her first novel, Beauty, was adapted into a television movie. A later book, One Good Dog, was a New York Times bestseller.

== Personal life ==
Susan lives on Martha's Vineyard with her husband. She has two grown daughters and three grandchildren. Susan is a horse lover with a Quarter horse mare, Maggie Rose.

== Selected works ==
- Beauty, Scribner, 1997
- Hawke’s Cove, 2000
- Cameo Lake, Pocket Books, 2001
- The Fortune Teller’s Daughter, 2002
- Summer Harbor, 2003
- One Good Dog, St. Martin’s Press, 2010
- The Dog Who Danced, St. Martin’s Press, 2012
- A Man of His Own, St. Martin’s Press, 2013
- The Dog Who Saved Me, St. Martin’s Press, 2015
- Two Good Dogs, St. Martin’s Press, 2017
- The Dog I Loved, St. Martin’s Press, 2019
