= James Thayer (author) =

American novelist

James Stewart "Jim" Thayer (born May 28, 1949) is an American author of thriller novels and an attorney. His first six novels were written under his full name, but since then his middle name is not used.

== Early life ==
Thayer was born in Eugene, Oregon. His father was a farmer. He is a graduate of Washington State University where he was inducted into the honors fraternity Phi Beta Kappa. Subsequently, he graduated from the University of Chicago Law School. He began writing his first novel while still in law school.

== Career ==
He is a member of the Washington State Bar Association. He has also been a creative writing instructor at the University of Washington. He broadcasts a weekly fiction-writing podcast, The Essential Guide to Writing a Novel.

== Personal life ==
Thayer resides in Seattle, Washington. He is married and has two daughters, Alex and Annemarie. He also has two other brothers living in Seattle, Joe and John, and one sister, Connie.

== Written works ==
- The Hess Cross, Putnam, 1977
- The Stettin Secret, Putnam, 1979
- The Earhart Betrayal, Putnam, 1980
- Pursuit, Crown Publishers, 1986
- Ringer, Crown Publishers, 1988
- S-Day: A Memoir of the Invasion of England, St. Martin's Press, 1990
- White Star Published in the (USA) by Simon & Schuster 1995 and also published by Macmillan (UK) in the same year in paperback
- Five Past Midnight, Simon & Schuster, 1997
- Man of the Century, Donald I. Fine Books, 1997
- Terminal Event, Simon & Schuster, 1999
- Force 12, Simon & Schuster, 2001
- The Gold Swan, Simon & Schuster, 2003
- "Fatty and Duke", The Weekly Standard, 21 July 2006.
- The Boxer and the Poet: Something of a Romance, Black Lyon Publishing, March 2008
- House of Eight Orchids, Thomas & Mercer, 2016
- Fagin & Miss Havisham, Creative Texts, 2024
- South After My Sister, Creative Texts, 2024
- My Stupid Swim Around Aphrodite's Rock, Another Realm, 2024
