= John J. Nance =

American novelist

- Born: July 5, 1946 (age 80); Dallas, Texas, U.S.
- Occupations: Pilot; attorney; aviation and healthcare safety analyst; author
- Writing career
- Genres: Aviation-based novels, non-fiction
- Notable works: Pandora's Clock, Medusa's Child, Why Hospitals Should Fly: The Ultimate Flight Plan to Patient Safety and Quality Care, Charting the Course: Launching Patient-Centric Healthcare
- Website: www.johnjnance.com

John J. Nance (born July 5, 1946) is an American pilot, attorney, aviation and healthcare safety analyst, and author.

== Biography ==
Nance was born and raised in Dallas, Texas, and graduated from the St. Mark's School of Texas. He earned Bachelor of Arts and Juris Doctor degrees from Southern Methodist University and Dedman School of Law.

Nance served in the United States Air Force as a pilot during the Vietnam War and in Operation Desert Storm in Iraq. He was a lieutenant colonel with the Air Force Reserve.

In January 1995, he joined ABC News as an aviation analyst, reporting on Good Morning America and World News Tonight. Before ABC, Nance had worked for three years at WFAA radio in Dallas, Texas. He has also appeared on over 1,300 radio and television shows, including The MacNeil–Lehrer Report, Oprah and Larry King Live.

Nance is also a New York Times best-selling author. Two of Nance's books, Pandora's Clock and Medusa's Child, were adapted and broadcast as a four-hour television miniseries for NBC and ABC.

Nance is the author of Why Hospitals Should Fly: The Ultimate Flight Plan to Patient Safety and Quality Care and Charting the Course: Launching Patient-Centric Healthcare. These books apply the principles learned in aviation to healthcare and patient safety.

Nance is the originator of the Red Cover Reports, a series of accident and incident analyses and recommendations using the principles of the National Transportation Safety Board accident reports colloquially known as "Blue Covers". The Red Cover Reports provide a neutral source of in-depth analysis of healthcare harm to caregivers and patients, including the 440,000 deaths due to medical error.

Also, as a former Braniff Airlines pilot, Nance authored A Splash of Colors: The Self-Destruction of Braniff International.

As of 2022, he has appeared on 18 episodes of Mayday as an aviation expert.

Nance lives in University Place, Washington, south of Seattle.

== Books ==
=== Fiction ===
- Final Approach (1990)
- Scorpion Strike (1992)
- Phoenix Rising (1993)
- Pandora's Clock (1995)
- Medusa's Child (1997)
- The Last Hostage (1998)
- Blackout (2000)
- Headwind (2001)
- Turbulence (2002)
- Skyhook (2003)
- Fire Flight (2003)
- Saving Cascadia (2005)
- Orbit (2006)
- Lockout (2016)
- 16 Souls (2017)

=== Non-fiction ===
- Splash of Colors: The Self-Destruction of Braniff International (1984)
- Blind Trust: The Revolution in Aviation Safety — Coming to Grips with Human Failure (1986)
- On Shaky Ground (1988)
- What Goes Up: The Global Assault on Our Atmosphere (1991)
- Golden Boy: The Harold Simmons Story (2003)
- Why Hospitals Should Fly: The Ultimate Flight Plan to Patient Safety and Quality Care (2008)
- Charting the Course: Launching Patient-Centric Healthcare (2012)
