= C. J. Box =

American writer (born 1958)

- Born: Charles James Box; November 9, 1958 (age 68); Casper, Wyoming, U.S.
- Education: University of Denver
- Occupation: Author
- Children: 3
- Writing career
- Period: 2001–present
- Genre: Mystery fiction thriller (genre)
- Website: www.cjbox.net

Charles James Box Jr. (born November 9, 1958) is an American author of more than thirty novels. Box is the author of the Joe Pickett series, as well as several standalone novels, and a collection of short stories. The novels have been translated into 27 languages. Over ten million copies of his novels have been sold in the U.S. alone. The first novel in his Joe Pickett series, Open Season, was included in The New York Times list of "Notable Books" of 2001. Open Season, Blue Heaven, Nowhere to Run, and The Highway have been optioned for film and television, the latter being adapted into the television drama series Big Sky, which debuted in November 2020. In March 2016, Off the Grid debuted at #1 on The New York Times Best Seller list. In 2021, Paramount Television Studios began production of a ten episode television adaptation of Box's Joe Pickett novels, featuring actor Michael Dorman as Joe Pickett, to air exclusively on the Spectrum cable television service in the U.S. The subsequent series was renewed for a second season in February 2022.

== Personal life and education ==
Box is a Wyoming native and currently lives in the state. He grew up in the city of Casper. Box graduated with a degree in Mass Communications from the University of Denver. Box enjoys fishing, golfing, and outdoor activities.

== Awards ==
- For Open Season, Box won the Anthony Award, the Macavity Award, the Gumshoe Award, and the Barry Award, all in the Best First Novel category.
- Prix Calibre 38 Award (France)
- Blue Heaven, his first stand-alone novel, won the Edgar Award for Best Mystery Novel of 2008.
- 2008 "BIG WYO" Award from Wyoming Tourism
- 2010 Mountains & Plains Independent Booksellers Association Award
- 2016 Western Heritage Award for Literature by the National Cowboy Museum
- 2021 Falcon Award for Breaking Point

== Bibliography ==
=== Joe Pickett novels ===
1. Open Season (Putnam, May 2001) ISBN 978-0-399-14748-7
2. Savage Run (Putnam, June 2002) ISBN 978-0-399-14887-3
3. Winterkill (Putnam, May 2003) ISBN 978-0-425-19595-6
4. Trophy Hunt (Putnam, June 2004) ISBN 978-0-399-15200-9
5. Out of Range (Putnam, May 2005) ISBN 978-0-399-15291-7
6. In Plain Sight (Putnam, May 2006) ISBN 978-0-399-15360-0
7. Free Fire (Putnam, May 2007) ISBN 978-0-399-15427-0
8. Blood Trail (Putnam, May 2008) ISBN 978-0-399-15488-1
9. Below Zero (Putnam, June 2009) ISBN 978-0-399-15575-8
10. Nowhere to Run (Putnam, April 2010) ISBN 978-0-399-15645-8
11. Cold Wind (Putnam, March 2011) ISBN 978-0-399-15735-6
12. Force of Nature (Putnam, March 2012) ISBN 978-0-399-15826-1
13. Breaking Point (Putnam, March 2013) ISBN 978-0-399-16075-2
14. Stone Cold (Putnam, March 2014) ISBN 978-0-399-16076-9
15. Endangered (Putnam, March 2015) ISBN 978-0-399-16077-6
16. Off the Grid (Putnam, March 2016) ISBN 978-0-399-17660-9
17. Vicious Circle (Putnam, March 2017) ISBN 978-0-399-17661-6
18. The Disappeared (Putnam, March 2018) ISBN 978-0-399-17662-3
19. Wolf Pack (Putnam, March 2019) ISBN 978-0-525-53819-6
20. Long Range (Putnam, March 2020) ISBN 978-0-525-53823-3
21. Dark Sky (Putnam, March 2021) ISBN 978-0-525-53827-1
22. Shadows Reel (Putnam, March 2022) ISBN 978-0-593-33126-2
23. Storm Watch (Putnam, February 2023) ISBN 978-0-593-33130-9
24. Three-Inch Teeth (Putnam, February 2024) ISBN 978-0-593-33134-7
25. Battle Mountain (Putnam, February 2025) ISBN 978-0-593-85105-0
26. The Crossroads (Putnam, February 2026) ISBN 978-0-593-85109-8
27. The Missing (Putnam, February 2027) ISBN 978-0-593-85113-5

=== Cody Hoyt / Cassie Dewell novels ===
- Back of Beyond (St. Martin's Minotaur, August 2011) ISBN 978-0-312-36574-5
- The Highway (St. Martin's Minotaur, July 2013) ISBN 978-0-312-58320-0
- Badlands (St. Martin's Minotaur, July 2015) ISBN 9780312583217
- Paradise Valley (St. Martin's Minotaur, July 2017) ISBN 9781250051042
- The Bitterroots (St. Martin's Minotaur, August 2019) ISBN 9781250051059
- Treasure State (St. Martin's Minotaur, September 2022) ISBN 978-1250766960

=== Stand-alone novels ===
- Blue Heaven (St. Martin's Minotaur, January 2008) ISBN 978-0-312-36570-7
- Three Weeks to Say Goodbye (St. Martin's Minotaur, January 2009) ISBN 978-0-312-36572-1
- Pronghorns of the Third Reich (Head of Zeus, April 2014) ISBN 978-1-781-85826-4

=== Short stories ===
1. Shots Fired: Stories from Joe Pickett Country (Putnam, July 2014) ISBN 978-0-399-15858-2

(Included in Shots Fired)

- Dull Knife (2005) ("A Joe Pickett Story")
- The Master Falconer (2006)
- Le Sauvage Noble (2007)

== Adaptations ==
- Big Sky (2020–2023) (Television series for the ABC network, adapted from the Cassie Dewell novels)
- Joe Pickett (2021–2023) (Television series for the Spectrum network and later Paramount+, adapted from the Joe Pickett novels)
