= Safe Haven (soundtrack) =

2013 soundtrack albums

Safe Haven (Original Motion Picture Soundtrack)

Soundtrack album by various artists
- Released: February 5, 2013
- Length: 44:47
- Label: Republic

Singles from Safe Haven (Original Motion Picture Soundtrack)
- 1. "We Both Know" Released: December 12, 2012

Safe Haven (Original Motion Picture Soundtrack) is the soundtrack album to the 2013 film Safe Haven directed by Lasse Hallström, based on Nicholas Sparks' 2010 novel of the same name. The soundtrack was released by Republic Records on February 5, 2013, and featured 13 songs heard in the film performed by artists Colbie Caillat, Ben Howard, Brandi Carlile, Amos Lee, Dar Williams and Gavin DeGraw amongst others.

== Background ==
The Safe Haven soundtrack was announced on January 16, 2013, with the complete track list. Prior to the album's announcement, the song "We Both Know" was released as a single on December 12, 2012.

== Track listing ==
No.	Title	Artist(s)	Length
1.	"We Both Know"	Colbie Caillat feat. Gavin DeGraw	3:50
2.	"Say Anything"	Tristan Prettyman	3:55
3.	"Keep Your Head Up"	Ben Howard	4:22
4.	"Summer Child"	Dar Williams	3:04
5.	"Sleepy Little Town"	The White Buffalo	2:24
6.	"Wrap Your Arms Around Me"	Gareth Dunlop	3:45
7.	"Moonshine"	Sara Haze	3:23
8.	"The Journey"	FM Radio	3:08
9.	"Heart's Content" (Strings Mix)	Brandi Carlile	3:34
10.	"Violin"	Amos Lee	5:18
11.	"My Baby's Got To Pay The Rent"	The Deep Dark Woods	2:44
12.	"Conoeing" (Katie and Alex's Theme)	Deborah Lurie	1:48
Total length:			41:15

Bonus track: MP3 and iTunes only
No.	Title	Artist(s)	Length
13.	"Go Your Own Way"	Lissie	3:32
Total length:			44:47

== Chart performance ==
Chart (2012)	Peak position
UK Soundtrack Albums (OCC)	31
US Billboard 200	133
US Top Soundtracks (Billboard)	5

== Original score ==
Safe Haven (Original Score)

Film score by Deborah Lurie
- Released: February 12, 2013
- Genre: Film score
- Length: 38:35
- Label: Relativity Music Group

Deborah Lurie chronology
Fun Size (2012)	Safe Haven (Original Score) (2013)	Murder of a Cat (2014)

Deborah Lurie composed the film score in her third collaboration with Hallström after An Unfinished Life (2005) and Dear John (2010). The score album was released under Relativity Music Group on February 12, 2013.

No.	Title	Length
1.	"Canoeing (Katie and Alex's Theme)"	1:48
2.	"Running Away"	3:01
3.	"Letting the Bus Go"	1:25
4.	"Walking in Southport"	2:30
5.	"Foot Through the Floor"	1:56
6.	"Josh Falls"	1:10
7.	"Kiss Goodnight"	1:10
8.	"Bedtime Without Mom"	2:04
9.	"Tierney's Rage"	3:00
10.	"Tierney Arrives"	5:26
11.	"No Safer Place"	2:55
12.	"Mom's Loft"	0:40
13.	"In Flames"	3:15
14.	"After the Fire"	2:33
15.	"Katie Thanks Jo"	1:12
16.	"The Letter"	3:11
17.	"Alex and Katie"	1:19
Total length:		38:35
