= List of Murder in the First episodes =

This is a list of episodes for the television series Murder in the First, an American detective anthology drama that airs on TNT. The series stars Taye Diggs and Kathleen Robertson. Set in San Francisco, the show follows a single case across an entire season.

During the course of the series, 32 episodes of Murder in the First aired, concluding on September 4, 2016.

== Series overview ==
Season	Episodes	Originally released	
Season	Episodes	First released	Last released
1	10	June 9, 2014	August 11, 2014
2	12	June 8, 2015	August 24, 2015
3	10	June 26, 2016	September 4, 2016

== Episodes ==
=== Season 1 (2014) ===
No. overall	No. in season	Title	Directed by	Written by	Original release date	US viewers (millions)
1	1	"Pilot"	Thomas Schlamme	Story by : Steven Bochco and Eric Lodal; Teleplay by : Eric Lodal	June 9, 2014	3.76
When an unidentified male is found dead in the Tenderloin district, SFPD Homicide Inspectors Terry English and Hildy Mulligan learn that the victim had been in contact with tech prodigy Erich Blunt. English and Mulligan find a likely suspect for the shooting and close the case, but are soon drawn back into the investigation when Blunt's flight attendant is found dead in her home.
2	2	"The City of Sisterly Love"	Jesse Bochco	Story by : Steven Bochco and Eric Lodal; Teleplay by : Eric Lodal	June 16, 2014	2.90
The medical examiner determines that Cindy, the flight attendant, was definitely a homicide, was two months pregnant, and had oral sex with a man (who could potentially be identified by DNA) within an hour of her death. The detectives bring in her ex-husband Mark, who has an alibi, and question Wilkerson, the pilot of the plane, who discovered her body. They surreptitiously obtain DNA samples from both. Walton takes a plea, but English is convinced the two homicides both involving Blunt must be linked. Against his lawyer's advice, Blunt appears for questioning by English and Mulligan, who play bad cop and good cop respectively. With his lawyer and English out of the room, Blunt tells Mulligan that although he is innocent, he has the resources to defeat any attempt at prosecuting him. Later he invites her to an off-duty romantic dinner, after which she kisses him, thus obtaining his DNA sample.
3	3	"Who's Your Daddy"	Rick Wallace	Story by : Steven Bochco and Eric Lodal; Teleplay by : Alison Cross	June 23, 2014	2.65
Evidence begins to mount against Blunt: lab tests show a high probability he is both the father of Cindy's unborn child and the source of the semen in her mouth, and Molk's acquaintance Hannah reveals to him that Blunt drugged and raped her, nearly choking her, some five years ago. The medical examiner is confident off the record that Cindy died at 8:30 p.m., though he can only testify to a range from 8:00 to midnight; a text came from Cindy's phone to Wilkerson at 9:00 but the detectives learn about ways this could have been faked by a technical expert like Blunt. Blunt reconsiders his strategy and hires famed defense attorney Warren Daniels. The boy who helped locate Walton finds Mulligan and tells her that his mother is in danger from her boyfriend. Later D-Hop, the boy, phones to say that an attack is in progress. Mulligan goes to the address and kills the boyfriend when he comes at her with a knife. She is placed on administrative leave for ten days. A drug dealer named Milan tells English that Blunt is an expert in krav maga; with heavy backup, English arrests him for the murder at his dojo.
4	4	"Burning Woman"	Ben Bolt	Story by : Steven Bochco and Eric Lodal; Teleplay by : Alison Cross	June 30, 2014	2.49
Blunt is released on $10M bail, but soon violates the conditions of his bond by flying to the Burning Man festival, where he is photographed. The judge revokes his bail and returns him to custody, and Daniels withdraws from his case. Before that, Milan reports that Blunt has arranged a drug buy, but when English stakes out the location he is met instead by Blunt's employee Salter, English's former SFPD boss. At her hearing on the shooting, Mulligan finds D-Hop's mother represented by an unscrupulous lawyer and misrepresenting the circumstances in the hope of winning a wrongful death suit. After English talks to D-Hop and Mulligan talks to his mother (with both detectives risking charges of witness tampering), the mother recants and Mulligan is both exonerated and returned to duty. At a dinner at Mulligan's house to celebrate, English and Mulligan share a kiss, but he leaves before things go further.
5	5	"Pants on Fire"	Allison Anders	Story by : Steven Bochco and Eric Lodal; Teleplay by : David Maples	July 7, 2014	2.55
Despite his lack of criminal experience, David takes over Blunt's defense. He meets with the mayor, and soon after the judge recuses himself and David is able to get the new judge to reinstate Blunt's bond. Salter leads the detectives to surveillance tapes destroying Mark's original alibi for the night of the murder, but his new story of a spontaneous tryst in a car is confirmed confidentially by the other party, one Dr. Smoot. When Blunt begs Daniels to return to the case, he gives Blunt a polygraph test and then agrees when he passes. Wilkerson's wife leaves him and serves him with divorce papers; he finds her with Blunt's help, and learns that she has somehow acquired a video of him having sex with Cindy. After an awkward discussion of the kiss with English, Mulligan returns home to find Blunt on her doorstep, asking for a date after his case is resolved.
6	6	"Punch Drunk"	Reggie Hudlin	Story by : Steven Bochco and Eric Lodal; Teleplay by : Brian Nelson	July 14, 2014	2.67
Six months later, Blunt's trial begins. English testifies to his belief that the two murders are related. Mulligan's ex-husband, as part of his alcohol recovery process, apologizes to English for a drunken fight three years ago. Inspired by this and by Mulligan's criticism of his quick resort to violence, English travels to San Quentin to apologize to Walton for beating him during interrogation. With no one else present, Walton recants his confession and urges English to find the actual killer of Blunt's father. At the trial, Mark Strauss is unable to convincingly assert his alibi under questioning from Daniels. Just as the prosecution is about to bring Dr. Smoot to the stand to verify the alibi, the trial is interrupted: Mark has been found dead of an apparent drug overdose, leaving a laptop with a suicide note in which he confesses to killing Cindy. Also, Wilkerson and his wife come to blows at a meeting arranged by David to discuss their potential divorce.
7	7	"Suck My Alibi"	Mike Mayers	Story by : Steven Bochco and Eric Lodal; Teleplay by : Brian Nelson	July 21, 2014	2.53
The DA tells Mulligan and English that she can delay, but not prevent, public release of the note found with Mark. They suspect Blunt's tech director, Ivana West, of writing the note, although digital records appear to give her an alibi. They bring West in, and, after she asks for a lawyer, English confronts her with stylistic evidence and threatens her with a media circus that would harm her firm's stock. She says that she picked up Mark at a bar intending to kill him, but that he died of a drug overdose first and she wrote the note. This testimony is inadmissible, but it allows the DA to truthfully say that Mark's death was neither a homicide nor suicide, and that he left no note. Mulligan and English then destroy the laptop. At the trial, Mulligan withstands Daniels' questioning, and Hannah testifies to her rape by Blunt, though she admits that she has no physical evidence of it.
8	8	"Win Some, Lose Some"	Jesse Bochco	Story by : Steven Bochco and Eric Lodal; Teleplay by : Alison Cross	July 28, 2014	2.74
Blunt takes the stand against Daniels' advice. He testifies that he saw Cindy that night, had sex with her, left her alive and well, lied to the police because it wouldn't look good, and learned about her pregnancy only from the leak of the autopsy. He also says that Hannah was his lover but that she made up the rape story to get a better settlement when Blunt sold his former company. A devastated Hannah is consoled by Molk. English again visits Walton and now believes his story. He also has sex on the first date with his realtor, but drives her away when she expresses love for him. West testifies that she was with Blunt later that night, and that she would take over the company were Blunt to be convicted and thus has no motive to protect him. Both sides make closing arguments, and that night Blunt tells Wilkerson that he was the one who sent the sex tape to his wife, believing that Wilkerson was better off without her. The jury returns quickly with a verdict of not guilty on both counts. On the way out of the courtroom, with no one else in earshot, Blunt reminds English and Mulligan of the rule of double jeopardy and then says that he killed Cindy.
9	9	"Family Matters"	Bethany Rooney	Story by : Steven Bochco and Eric Lodal; Teleplay by : Eric Lodal	August 4, 2014	2.69
English and Mulligan pursue the theory that Blunt directed the murder of Kevin Nyers, his biological father. Questioned by English, D-Hop and his friend recant their identification of Walton, saying that an older man threatened them with a gun into silence. Noting that the killer took care to leave no clues, English questions Salter, who denies his guilt and brings Blunt's political influence to bear so that Koto orders them off the case, assigning them a new one out of rotation. This is the death of a wealthy drug user who overdosed, possibly from drugs injected by another, before being left for several days in a bathtub. The obvious suspect is her husband, but Daniels later appears with evidence that the husband (his new client) was in rehab since before the wife was seen alive. English again visits Harbach, Blunt's maternal grandfather, who is dying of cancer. He denies involvement in Nyers' death but D-Hop identifies him as the one who threatened him. Harbach is then found dead with an apparently self-inflicted wound from the gun that killed Nyers, leaving a note saying that he killed Nyers and acted alone. Walton is released, and Koto forbids Mulligan and English from further pursuing their theory that Blunt was involved. West tells Blunt that she is leaving his company to form another; Blunt reacts angrily and later English confronts him and vows to find him out.
10	10	"Blunt the Edge"	Jesse Bochco	Story by : Steven Bochco and Eric Lodal; Teleplay by : Eric Lodal	August 11, 2014	3.39
The detectives learn that the gun that killed Nyers once belonged to Salter. Questioned, Salter tells them that he gave the gun to Blunt some years ago; he then quits his job with Blunt. This circumstantial case is not good enough for the DA, who will only try Blunt for the second murder if she has ironclad proof. Mulligan and English again visit Mrs. Harbach and win her confidence, finally learning that Wilkerson was involved in Blunt's dealings with her husband. Wilkerson visits Blunt, who finds the recording device hidden in his watch and then explains how he committed both murders, including his orders against Cindy to abort his child. Blunt arrives at the police station the next morning, claiming evidence that Salter and Wilkerson killed Nyers, but he is surprised to learn that the NSA (with a federal search warrant) hacked his own phone and recorded his conversation with Wilkerson. He is arrested and his company's stock loses all its value. Daniels refuses to defend him again, telling David that he knew all along that Blunt killed Cindy and actually failed the lie detector test. The detectives' celebratory walk in Golden Gate Park is interrupted by the news that Blunt has hanged himself in his cell.

=== Season 2 (2015) ===
No. overall	No. in season	Title	Directed by	Written by	Original release date	US viewers (millions)
11	1	"Twenty-Fifteen"	Jesse Bochco	Eric Lodal	June 8, 2015	2.38
Terry and Hildy investigate when two students open fire on a school bus.
12	2	"Schizofrenzy"	Jesse Bochco	Robert Munic	June 15, 2015	2.19
A manhunt for a missing shooter proves to be more difficult than anticipated. Meanwhile, Terry is promoted as acting lieutenant, but the greater job responsibilities soon test him.
13	3	"Blue on Blue"	Allison Anders	Daniele Nathanson	June 22, 2015	2.19
The city reels from the school-bus tragedy as the newly appointed district attorney promises justice for the victims. Meanwhile, evidence emerges about a cop's death, and the body of a gang member is found.
14	4	"My Sugar Walls"	Michael Mayers	Jonathan Abrahams	June 29, 2015	2.15
Raffi has fears that Hildy's continuing murder probe will impact her own case. Meanwhile, a defense team enlists an acclaimed attorney, and emerging evidence suggests that an inspector was murdered.
15	5	"The McCormack Mulligan"	Allison Anders	Robert Munic	July 6, 2015	1.96
The pressure is on Terry and Hildy to find a cop killer. Meanwhile, Jamie makes a surprise move in her defense of Dustin; Navarro reunites with his brother; and Raffi receives an anonymous tip.
16	6	"Oh Mexico"	Jessie Bochco	Daniele Nathanson	July 13, 2015	2.00
Jamie digs into Dustin's past. Meanwhile, Terry and Hildy investigate people within their own department, and Sugar makes a stunning discovery when someone close to him vanishes.
17	7	"State of the Union"	Reggie Hudlin	Eric Lodal	July 20, 2015	1.93
Terry and Hildy head to Mexico when truths emerge about Navarro. Meanwhile, a fuming Suger prepares for war, and unforeseen developments mark Raffi's investigation into Suger.
18	8	"Out of the Shadows"	David Boyd	Jonathan Abrahams	July 27, 2015	2.18
Junior reveals new details, possibly giving leverage to Hildy and Terry in their investigation. Meanwhile, the trial of Dustin Maker kicks off with opening statements, and Sugar receives startling information about his sister from a surprising source.
19	9	"Bruja Blanca"	Reggie Hudlin	Daniele Nathanson	August 3, 2015	2.10
Terry and Hildy's investigation suffers a serious setback. Meanwhile, Raffi's loyalty is questioned, and the stress of the trial takes a toll on Jamie.
20	10	"Nothing But The Truth"	Allison Anders	Alison Cross	August 10, 2015	2.02
Witnesses take the stand in the case against Dustin. Meanwhile, Jamie faces fallout from her tirade, and threats are made against Hildy's family.
21	11	"Down Time"	Martha Mitchell	Jonathan Abrahams & Daniele Nathanson	August 17, 2015	1.88
A high-ranking officer is taken into custody by Terry and Hildy. Meanwhile, an unexpected threat revolves around Sugar and Potrero, and Molk unearths disturbing information about a possible prostitution ring.
22	12	"Number Thirty Nine"	Jesse Bochco	Jonathan Abrahams	August 24, 2015	1.83
Terry and Hildy swarm in on a murder suspect. Also: Fatty B tries to push Potrero in a new direction, and the trial of Dustin Maker reaches a climactic verdict with Dustin ultimately being sentenced to death.

=== Season 3 (2016) ===
No. overall	No. in season	Title	Directed by	Written by	Original release date	US viewers (millions)
23	1	"Normandy Bitch"	Jesse Bochco	Story by : Steven Bochco and Jonathan Abrahams; Teleplay by : Jonathan Abrahams	June 26, 2016	1.38
At his birthday party in a darkened nightclub, pro footballer Normandy Parker is shot dead and the assailant escapes. The police identify his longtime friend Billy James as the one person who evaded the weapons check, but he is not immediately found. Parker's celebrity girlfriend Alicia Barnes refuses to be questioned. At his own birthday party, D.A. Siletti has a tryst with Melissa Danson from the state Attorney General's staff. Arguing with his wife on the drive home, he kills a pedestrian and is arraigned for vehicular homicide; Danson is put in charge of the prosecution. Mulligan is diagnosed with breast cancer and told to put her affairs in order. Worried about Louise's future, she is badly distracted, but eventually confides in English who promises to support her.
24	2	"Tropic of Cancer"	Rick Wallace	Daniele Nathanson	July 3, 2016	1.39
English offers to move in with Mulligan to help her during her cancer treatment but, when they learn that the diagnosis was a mistake, they go home and have sex. Siletti hires a specialist in DUI cases, who visits Danson and finds her uninterested in a plea bargain. His wife and son move out of his house. Barnes comes in to tell the police that James was having an affair with Parker's estranged wife Daphne, who had financial motive to kill Parker. Daphne admits to having sex with James once, but denies both criminal involvement and knowledge of James' whereabouts. Video evidence from an unrelated homicide places James in the Excelsior District. Based on a tip, the police raid an apartment there and a man flees through the window with English in pursuit. When he reaches for his back, English shoots him dead, but he was not James and was apparently unarmed.
25	3	"Black and Blue"	Eriq LaSalle	Corinne Marrinan	July 10, 2016	1.34
Public protests erupt over the man that English killed. English and Mulligan both testify (the latter falsely) that they saw the gun on him before the chase started. When the gun is found, English is cleared. Another tip then leads to the capture of James in a homeless encampment; he is unresponsive to questioning. The detectives learn that Parker's finances were precarious and that his business associates resented James and the other hangers-on. Siletti attempts to influence Danson, the attorney general, and the acting D.A. without success. After his own lawyer stresses the importance of his wife not testifying about his drinking at the party, Siletti visits her and, for the first time, expresses contrition for the crash.
26	4	"The Barbers of Seville"	Dan Shaw	Alison Cross	July 17, 2016	1.29
After an argument at the recording studio, Barnes' manager Andy Lippman returns home to find her unconscious in the bathtub; he clashes with her father Paul (Anthony Michael Hall) after she revives in the hospital. Searching the house, Mulligan and English discover that Parker had a life-threatening heart condition. Siletti sabotages the new D.A.'s prosecution of a rape case. James is released for lack of evidence. On the advice of his lawyer, he lays low for a time, but then borrows a car and visits a park, where he briefly evades surveillance and is shot dead at close range. Koto tells English that unless he and Mulligan break off their relationship, one of them must leave the homicide division. English offers to do so, but Mulligan opts to sacrifice the romance to preserve their partnership and friendship.
27	5	"Follow the Money"	Martha Mitchell	Ethan Kass	July 24, 2016	1.47
The detectives learn that most of Parker's money was invested in Sam Rydell's sandwich shop chain and that someone shorted the stock just before Parker was killed. They trace the trade to Parker's business manager, who claims he did it because he knew Rydell was in general trouble, not due to any prior knowledge of the murder. He also suggests that Rydell had motive because he held a life insurance policy in Parker's name. Rydell is tortured and abducted by Chinese gang members to whom he is indebted. Siletti convinces his wife and son to return home, but both seem eager to exploit their newfound leverage over him. A woman brought in on drug charges claims to have witnessed Siletti's crash. Mulligan's date with medical examiner Burnside is interrupted when Rydell's car is found abandoned on the Richmond Bridge.
28	6	"Sam I Am"	Nicole Rubio	Daniele Nathanson	July 31, 2016	1.31
Rydell is identified in Reno after suffering a nonfatal heart attack while gambling under an assumed name; when brought back, he confesses to fraud, but does not appear to be a likely suspect for the murders. Sports blogger Serena Parrish tells Koto that footballer Luke Wedman once threatened Parker with a gun after a game didn't go as planned. Koto's later meeting with her to explain that Wedman had solid alibis for both murders develops into a sexual encounter. An incorrect report of shots fired at the Barnes mansion leads to a search that yields a gun which is both registered to Lippman and a ballistics match to the Parker shooting. The new DA insists on charging Lippman, but the detectives are skeptical because he has an alibi for the James murder. Siletti is served with a $15M lawsuit for wrongful death and explores private sector job options. Mulligan has a pleasant date with Burnside, but sends English a romantic text afterward.
29	7	"Let's Make a Deal"	Allison Anders	Corinne Marrinan	August 14, 2016	1.10
After being arraigned for murder and held without bail, Lippman suggests to the detectives that Paul Barnes had access to the gun and a motive to hire James to kill Parker. They interview both Paul and his ex-wife Kat Cooper, who has not interacted with Alicia since she suspected a possible sexual relationship between father and daughter. Paul claims to have been at Alicia's hospital bedside for the entire day on which James was killed, but it is possible he left briefly. When Parrish misses a lunch date, Koto goes to her home and finds her dead; Wedman is arrested for the murder and admits killing her in a struggle but denies premeditation. Koto blames himself for telling Parrish about Wedman's prior violent history, leading to her fatal interview with him. Siletti refuses a plea bargain that would avoid jail time but still limit his future employment prospects. His trial begins but is recessed when the drug-using eyewitness is unable to testify. English buys an expensive birthday present for Louise, triggering a dispute with Mulligan.
30	8	"Daddy Dearest"	Mark-Paul Gosselaar	Alison Cross	August 21, 2016	1.31
Mulligan covertly records an interview with Alicia Barnes, in which the latter admits to an incestuous relationship with her father, but says it was consensual. Paul Barnes is now their prime suspect but they lack evidence to proceed. English revisits the police counselor (Kim Delaney) and gets advice that helps him stabilize his partnership with Mulligan. Siletti's trial continues; his prospects appear to improve when the new D.A. says he was not drunk at the party, but suffer with the testimony of the victim's husband. With Cassie Siletti on the stand, Mario directs his lawyer to ask her whether he was distracted before the crash. She says they were arguing over Mario's dalliance with Danson, now his prosecutor. After an uproar, the judge declares a mistrial, but warns that Siletti may be retried; his lawyer refuses to represent him again.
31	9	"Rise of the Phoenix"	Allison Anders	Ethan Kass	August 28, 2016	1.50
Things begin looking up for Siletti: His case is not retried by the Attorney General who is trying to minimize the damage by firing Danson, he accepts a lucrative offer from a firm of defense attorneys, and he pressures his victim's husband, an illegal immigrant, to drop the civil suit. Louise and two of her friends are caught shoplifting. After English explains to her how his own mother's influence kept him from a life of crime, she and Mulligan are somewhat reconciled. James' wallet is found, containing the key to a box in a highly secure private vault. The box is empty, as James apparently mailed the contents to his lawyer sometime between the Parker murder and his own death. English asks the grandfather of James' lawyer, a mentor to both Parker and James, to get his grandson to break posthumous attorney–client privilege and turn over the package. It contains a locked cell phone, which they determine was sold to Alicia Barnes.
32	10	"Kat's Meow"	Jesse Bochco	Alison Cross & Corinne Marrinan & Daniele Nathanson & Ethan Kass	September 4, 2016	1.61
Alicia unlocks the phone, which contains a voice recording of someone hiring James to kill Parker. Voice analysis confirms English's identification of the hirer as Paul Barnes, but not before Kat goes to Alicia's house, shoots Paul dead, calls the police, and confesses. Siletti buys the car he promised his son, but his wife forces him to create a trust fund for the children of the woman he killed. Meanwhile, Molk and Navarro are assigned the case of Maria Rivera, brutally beaten to death in her home. The obvious suspect is her abusive husband, but he is killed in a drive-by shooting before he can be arrested. The truck used in the shooting is traced to Maria's father, who surrenders and does not dispute his guilt. The detectives are sympathetic until they learn that the father was a gang assassin and is himself a domestic abuser. When Alicia learns of her father's death, she checks out of rehab and drinks herself sick. Mulligan cleans her up, allows her to sleep it off in an interrogation room, then plays the recording for her and shows her an overdose victim in the morgue. Taken to see her mother, Alicia hugs her as English and Mulligan look on holding hands.
