= David Lyons (actor) =

Australian actor

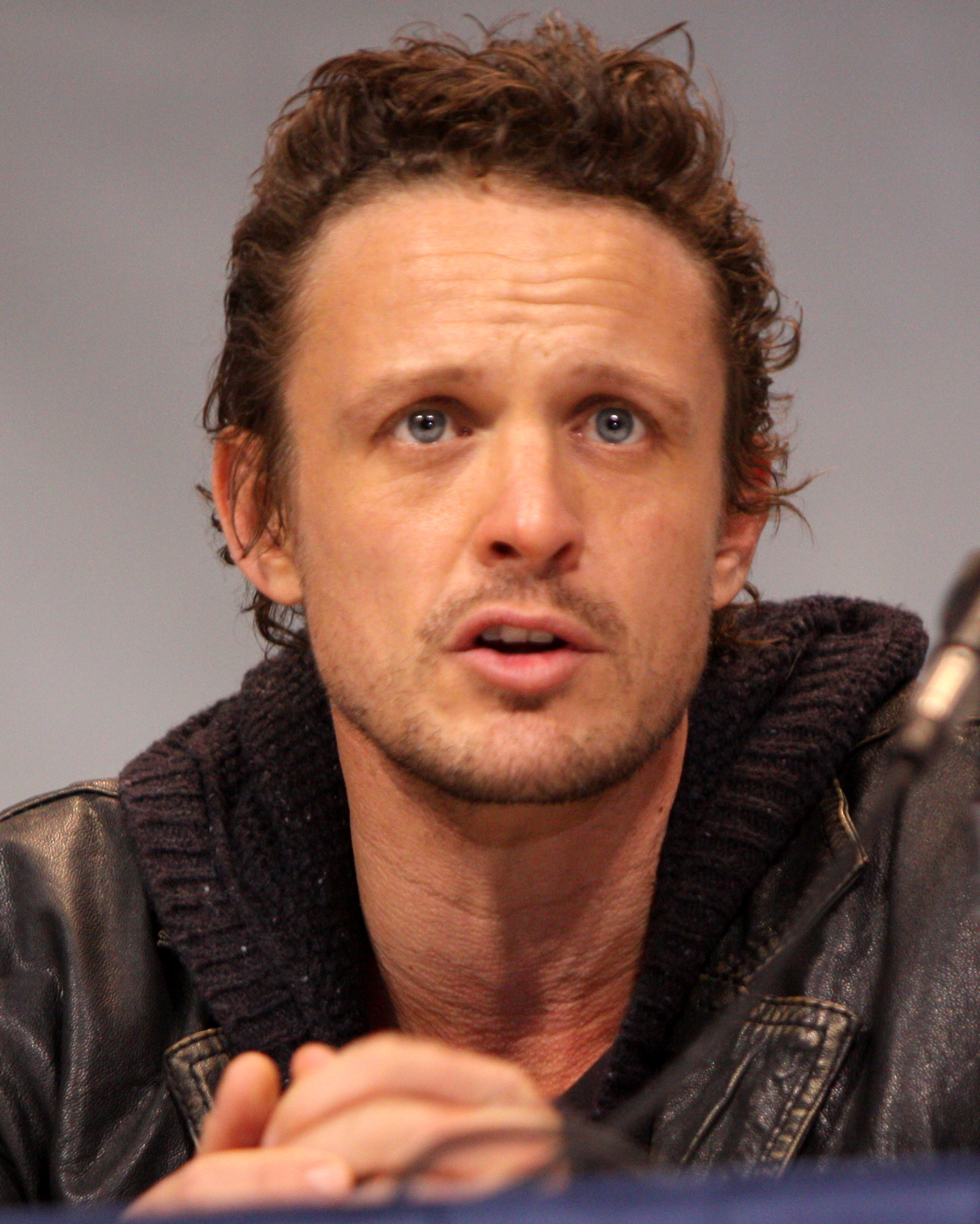
- Lyons speaking at the 2013 WonderCon in Anaheim, California
- Education: Yarra Valley Grammar
- Alma mater: National Institute of Dramatic Art
- Occupation: Actor
- Years active: 2002–present
- Spouse: Carly Pope
- Children: 1

David Lyons is an Australian actor. He is known for his roles Josh Holiday in the Nine Network navy drama Sea Patrol (2007–2009), Dr. Simon Brenner in the NBC medical drama ER (2008–2009), as General Sebastian Monroe in the NBC post-apocalyptic drama Revolution (2012–2014) and as FBI agent Brian Abbott in the Netflix limited series The Beast In Me (2025) as well as FBI agent Adam Corrigan in the third season of the Netflix series The Night Agent (2026).

== Early life and education ==
Lyons graduated from Yarra Valley Grammar school in 1993 and continued on to graduate from Australia's National Institute of Dramatic Art (NIDA) with a degree in Performing Arts (Acting) in 2004.

== Career ==
In 2005, Lyons had a recurring role on the Seven Network police drama Blue Heelers and guest-starred on the Seven Network/Network Ten/Eleven soap opera Neighbours.

Lyons starred in the Nine Network police drama Sea Patrol, where he played the Leading Seaman Josh Holiday for the show's first three series from 2007 until 2009.

Lyons began starring in the NBC medical drama ER as Dr. Simon Brenner, making his first appearance in season 14, episode 14 titled "Owner of a Broken Heart" which aired on 10 April 2008, but he was credited as a special guest star. When the show's 15th and final season premiere titled "Life After Death" aired on 25 September 2008, Lyons was added to the main cast. Lyons remained on the show until it ended with the two-hour series finale, "And in the End...", which aired on 2 April 2009.

In 2009, Lyons starred in the television film A Model Daughter: The Killing of Caroline Byrne.

In 2010, Lyons appeared in the biographical romantic drama Eat Pray Love, which starred Julia Roberts and was based on Elizabeth Gilbert's autobiography of the same name.

In January 2011, Lyons starred as the title role in the NBC superhero drama The Cape, until the show was cancelled in March that same year after ten episodes.

Lyons co-starred with Billy Burke in the NBC post-apocalyptic drama Revolution, which ran for two seasons from 2012 to 2014. He played Sebastian "Bas" Monroe, a former US Marine Corps sergeant who served with Miles Matheson (Burke), founded the Monroe Republic, and became its president and later general of its militia.

In 2013, Lyons co-starred with Josh Duhamel and Julianne Hough in the romantic drama Safe Haven, based on Nicholas Sparks' novel of the same name.

The short film Record was released in 2013. Lyons was the director, composer, and one of the screenwriters.

Lyons will appear in the upcoming Netflix limited series adaptation All the Sinners Bleed, based on the S. A. Cosby novel of the same name.

== Personal life ==
Born April 16, 1976 Lyons is married to Canadian actress Carly Pope. In November 2024, Pope gave birth to their child.

== Filmography ==
=== Film ===
Year	Title	Role	Notes
2007	Storm Warning	Jimmy	
2008	Cactus	Eli Jones	
2010	Eat Pray Love	Ian	
2011	Swerve	Colin	
2011	Möbius	Steve	Short film
2012	Save Your Legs!	The Prince	
2013	Safe Haven	Kevin Tierney	
2013	The Trials of Cate McCall	Josh	
2015	Truth	Josh Howard	
2025	She Rides Shotgun	Jimmy	

=== Television ===
Year	Title	Role	Notes
2002	Neighbours	Damian Slattery	
2005	Blue Heelers	Jason Tyler	4 episodes
2007–2009	Sea Patrol	Leading Seaman Josh "E.T." Holiday	Series regular
2008–2009	ER	Dr. Simon Brenner	Special guest cast (season 14), main cast (season 15)
2009	A Model Daughter: The Killing of Caroline Byrne	Gordon Wood	Television film
2010	Day One	Sam	Television film
2011	The Cape	Vince Farraday / The Cape	Series regular
2012	Don't Try This at Home	Matt	Episode: "Sex/Death, Part II"
2012–2014	Revolution	General Sebastian "Bass" Monroe	Series regular
2013	Revolution: Enemies of the State	General Sebastian "Bass" Monroe	TV miniseries
2016	Game of Silence	Jackson Brooks	Series regular
2018	Philip K. Dick's Electric Dreams	Connie	Episode: "Autofac"
2018	Seven Seconds	Mike Diangelo	Series regular
2019	The Commons	Lloyd Green	Series regular
2021–2023	Truth Be Told	Detective Aames	Series regular
2022	Troppo	Lou Damford	Series regular
2025	Invisible Boys	Father Mulroney	TV series
2025	The Beast in Me	Brian Abbott	Recurring
2026	The Night Agent	Adam Corrigan	Main role (season 3)
TBA	All the Sinners Bleed †	Jasper Sanderson	Limited series

== Awards and nominations ==
Year	Award	Category	Nominated work	Result
2014	Stellae Awards	Best Actor	Penance	Won
2014	Heartland International Film Festival	Best Narrative Short	Record	Won
