= Sounds of the Season =

Sounds of the Season may refer to:

- Sounds of the Season: The Lionel Richie Collection (2006)
- Sounds of the Season: The Enya Holiday Collection (2006)
- Sounds of the Season: The KT Tunstall Holiday Collection (2007)
- Sounds of the Season: The Taylor Swift Holiday Collection (2007)
- Sounds of the Season: The Julianne Hough Holiday Collection (2008)
