= Mimi Kirkland =

American actress

- Born: October 15, 2004 (age 21); Raleigh, North Carolina, U.S.
- Occupation: Actress
- Years active: 2013–present

Mimi Kirkland (born October 15, 2004) is an American actress. She is best known for playing Louise Mulligan in the crime drama series Murder in the First and Lexie in the romance film Safe Haven

== Early life ==
Kirkland was born in Raleigh, North Carolina. She got interested in acting after entertaining her friends at school and making them laugh. At her pre-school graduation, her teacher asked the students what they wanted to be, and she told the crowd she wanted to be an actress. She has said that her parents were very supportive of her acting career.

== Career ==
Kirkland made her on-screen debut playing Lexi in the romance film Safe Haven starring Josh Duhamel and Julianne Hough. Kirkland’s first recurring and first appearance in a TV show was in Disney Channels Austin & Ally where she played Lily.

Kirkland was exposed to a larger audience when she was cast as Rachel in the hugely popular series The Walking Dead. Her first leading role in a television series was as Louise in Murder in the First.

== Personal life ==
She cites Bridgit Mendler as an inspiration. She enjoys roller skating, riding her bike, swimming, cooking, playing the recorder, and traveling. Her favorite singer is Justin Bieber.

== Filmography ==
=== Film ===
Year	Title	Role	Notes
2013	Safe Haven	Lexie	

=== Television ===
Year	Title	Role	Notes
2015	Austin & Ally	Lily	4 episodes
2014–2016	Murder in the First	Louise Mulligan	32 episodes
2016–2018	The Walking Dead	Rachel	7 episodes
