= Murder in the First (TV series) =

TV series

- Genre: Crime drama; Mystery
- Created by: Steven Bochco; Eric Lodal
- Starring: Taye Diggs; Kathleen Robertson; Richard Schiff; Ian Anthony Dale; Raphael Sbarge; Lombardo Boyer; Bess Rous; Mimi Kirkland; Tom Felton; Steven Weber; James Cromwell; Nicole Ari Parker; Currie Graham; Laila Robins; Emmanuelle Chriqui; A. J. Buckley; Mo McRae; John Cothran; Mateus Ward; Corey Reynolds; Sara Paxton; Michael Gaston
- Country of origin: United States
- Original language: English
- No. of seasons: 3
- No. of episodes: 32 (list of episodes)

Production
- Executive producers: Steven Bochco; Eric Lodal; Thomas Schlamme
- Running time: 42 minutes
- Production companies: Steven Bochco Productions; Shoe Money Productions; TNT Original Productions

Original release
- Network: TNT
- Release: June 9, 2014 – September 4, 2016

Murder in the First is an American crime drama television series that originally aired on TNT. The series was created by Steven Bochco and Eric Lodal, and stars Taye Diggs and Kathleen Robertson. Set in San Francisco, the show follows a single case across an entire season. The series aired for three seasons from June 9, 2014 to September 4, 2016. This series was the last produced by Bochco.

On October 11, 2016, TNT canceled the series after three seasons.

== Overview ==
In the first season, Homicide Inspectors Terry English and Hildy Mulligan investigate two seemingly unrelated murders only to learn both victims have ties to a Silicon Valley prodigy who is darker than anyone realizes.

In the second season, as San Francisco recovers from a school bus massacre, English and Mulligan investigate the death of a fellow officer and uncover a conspiracy that shakes the city to its core.

In the third season, English and Mulligan juggle investigating a football player's murder and dealing with their respective personal issues while District Attorney Mario Siletti reels from a tragedy that jeopardizes his career.

== Cast and characters ==
=== Main cast ===
- Taye Diggs as Inspector Terry English: a homicide inspector with the San Francisco Police Department who struggles to cope with his wife's death. He is a former U.S. Marine Corps scout-sniper.
- Kathleen Robertson as Inspector Hildy Mulligan: English's partner and a single mother who juggles raising her daughter and doing her job.
- Ian Anthony Dale as Lieutenant Jim Koto: the squad's no-nonsense supervisor
- Raphael Sbarge as Inspector David Molk: a philosophizing SFPD homicide inspector
- Lombardo Boyar as Inspector Edgar Navarro: a dedicated SFPD homicide inspector, Molk's partner
- Currie Graham as Chief Prosecutor Mario Siletti
- Mimi Kirkland as Louise Mulligan: Hildy's inquisitive eleven-year-old daughter.

=== Supporting cast ===
- Jamie McShane as Justin Burnside: a forensics technician from the Medical Examiner's office.
- Camille Balsamo as Kami Keefer: the homicide squad's technology expert who has a crush on Hildy Mulligan.
- Jamie Luner as Cassie Siletti, Mario Siletti's wife.

Season 1

- Tom Felton as Erich Blunt: a young Silicon Valley prodigy who the SFPD suspects of murdering his biological father and his latest personal mistress.
- Steven Weber as Bill Wilkerson: Blunt's long-time friend, chauffeur, and pilot whose marriage is put in jeopardy following Blunt's arrest.
- James Cromwell as Warren Daniels: a well-known yet unscrupulous criminal defense attorney hired to represent Blunt.
- Richard Schiff as David Hertzberg: Blunt's personal and corporate attorney.
- Bess Rous as Ivana West: the chief technology officer of Erich Blunt's company and one of his mistresses.
- Nicole Ari Parker as District Attorney Jacqueline Perez, who is having an affair with Jim Koto; she resigns when it becomes public.
- Peter Onorati as Jimmy Salter, a former police sergeant turned head of security of Blunt's company.
- Charles Baker as Chris Walton, a drug dealer who is suspected of murder.

Season 2

- Laila Robins as Jamie Nelson: a professor of law and a famous criminal defense attorney.
- Emmanuelle Chriqui as Sergeant Raphaelle "Raffi" Veracruz: a gang unit and special operations officer who is a veteran of the Israeli Army.
- A. J. Buckley as Inspector Marty "Junior" McCormack: a special operations officer and Hildy's brother, who transfers to Homicide from Vice.
- Mo McRae as Anthony "Suger" Cascade: the kingpin of an African-American gang, dealing with the accidental death of a member of another gang during an unsanctioned warehouse heist.
- Marcus Hopson as Fatty B, Sugar's right-hand man.
- Mateus Ward as Dustin Maker: one of two high school boys participating in the bus shooting before being captured by the SFPD. He is later given the death penalty for his role in the crime.
- Jimmy Bennett as Alfie Rentman: the second boy participating in the shooting, who escapes capture but is later killed.
- Spencer Garrett as Dr. Frank Rentman: Alfie's father, a psychiatrist who diagnoses Alfie's mental illness.
- Laura Regan as Mary Rentman: Alfie's mother, who appears to be in denial about Alfie's mental state.
- Adam O'Byrne as Det. Kaleb Peat: a member of the squad and Walt Martin's partner, who commits suicide after Martin's funeral.
- Inny Clemons as Det. Walt Martin: a member of the squad, and Peat's partner, who is presumed to be shot by Alfie Rentman, but was actually shot by a cop.
- Jade Tailor as Alyssa: a stripper who Det. Molk becomes involved with.

Season 3

- Kim Delaney as Dr. Nancy Redman: Inspector Terry English therapist.
- Anthony Michael Hall as Paul Barnes.
- Tiffany Dupont as Serena Parrish: A sports blogger who Lieutenant Jim Koto becomes involved with.
- Michael Gaston as Alfred Arkin: Defended suspended DA Mario Siletti in his DUI trial.
- Sara Paxton as Alicia Barnes.
- Corey Reynolds as ADA Martin Reardon.
- Amanda Schull as Melissa Danson: She had affair with suspended DA Mario Siletti who she also prosecuted.
- Robert Cicchini as Chief Charles Shannon.

== Episodes ==
Season	Episodes	Originally released	
Season	Episodes	First released	Last released
1	10	June 9, 2014	August 11, 2014
2	12	June 8, 2015	August 24, 2015
3	10	June 26, 2016	September 4, 2016

== Production ==
TNT ordered 10 episodes on September 19, 2013, which premiered on June 9, 2014. On September 12, 2014, TNT renewed Murder in the First for a 12-episode second season, which began on June 8, 2015. On November 12, 2015, TNT renewed Murder in the First for a third season, which was set to premiere on June 19, 2016, but was pushed back to the following week due to the delayed third season premiere of The Last Ship.

== Critical reception ==
Murder in the First scored 68 out of 100, in its first season, on Metacritic based on 20 reviews. Its second season scored 67, based on four reviews. The review aggregator website Rotten Tomatoes currently reports a 73% critics’ rating with an average rating of 6.8/10 based on 22 reviews. The website consensus reads: "Murder in the First fits happily into the over-arcing [sic] season-long murder mystery mold, offering pleasurably typical twists and natural, attention-grabbing characters."

== Broadcasts ==
Murder in the First has aired in several international countries in Italy, France, Australia, Latin America, Portugal, United Kingdom, Russia, Denmark, and Germany.

In Australia, it has aired on Network Ten and 10 Peach, Top Crime and Premium Crime in Italy, Fox in the UK, TNT Series in Latin America, and WarnerTV Serie in Germany.

Universal Networks International has acquired international rights to Murder in the First in 2014, including European countries such as France, Denmark, and Portugal.

It first aired on Universal Channel in France on July 30, 2014.^{[17]} It then aired on 13th Street in Denmark on August 12 all the way up to the last day of 2016.

And last but not least, in Portugal, Murder in the First aired on Diva.

== Home media ==
Name	Region 1	Region 2	Region 4	Discs
Murder in the First: The Complete First Season	May 12, 2015	—N/a	—N/a	3
