= Safe Haven (film) =

2013 film by Lasse Hallström

- Theatrical release poster
- Directed by: Lasse Hallström
- Screenplay by: Gage Lansky; Dana Stevens
- Based on: Safe Haven by Nicholas Sparks
- Produced by: Marty Bowen; Chad Freet; Wyck Godfrey; Ryan Kavanaugh
- Starring: Josh Duhamel; Julianne Hough; Cobie Smulders; David Lyons
- Cinematography: Terry Stacey
- Edited by: Andrew Mondshein
- Music by: Deborah Lurie
- Production companies: Relativity Media; Temple Hill Entertainment
- Distributed by: Relativity Media
- Release date: February 14, 2013
- Running time: 115 minutes
- Country: United States
- Language: English
- Budget: $28 million
- Box office: $97.6 million

Safe Haven is a 2013 American romantic drama film starring Julianne Hough, Josh Duhamel and Cobie Smulders. The film marks the final film role for actor Red West. The film was directed by Lasse Hallström, and is an adaptation of Nicholas Sparks' 2010 novel. The film was originally set for a February 8 release. The film was released by Relativity Media on February 14, 2013 to negative reviews from critics and grossed $97.6 million against a $28 million budget.

== Plot ==
Barefoot and covered in blood, a terrified woman runs to a neighbor’s house for shelter. After cutting and bleaching her hair, she arrives at a bus station. The police arrive and start looking for her, but she has already escaped on a bus.

In Southport, North Carolina, the woman, now known as Katie Feldman, gets a job as a waitress, and rents a small house on the edge of town. She befriends her neighbor, Jo, and meets Alex Wheatley, a shopkeeper who operates the local general store. He is a widowed father of two young children, Josh, who has a strained relationship with him, and Lexie.

Katie soon begins a relationship with Alex, becoming a mother figure to Josh and Lexie. Meanwhile, Boston police detective Kevin Tierney prepares wanted posters for "Erin", a woman accused of first-degree murder. Alex sees the poster in the police station and notices the picture bears a striking resemblance to Katie. Following an argument with Katie, Alex breaks up with her and she packs to move on.

As Katie is about to leave town, Alex intercepts her, begging Katie not to leave and promising to keep her safe. Katie reluctantly returns his love, and decides to stay in Southport (though still apprehensive of bringing danger upon his family). Katie tells him that she fled there to escape her abusive and alcoholic husband.

Meanwhile, Kevin is suspended for creating the false wanted posters – for crimes that were not committed – and for drinking on the job. It is revealed that on the night Katie ran away, she stabbed Kevin (her husband) with a knife when he attacked her in a drunken rage. Enraged, Kevin breaks into Katie's former neighbor's home in Boston, getting the phone number to the restaurant where Katie works.

Arriving in time for the town's Fourth of July parade, a severely intoxicated Kevin sees Katie kissing Alex. That evening, Katie has a dream that as she is standing on the docks watching the fireworks when Jo comes up and tells her that "he" is here. Katie wakes up in the convenience store next to a sleeping Lexie when Kevin suddenly appears and confronts her, demanding that she go back with him. Katie refuses and tells him to leave but Kevin pulls a gun and pours gasoline all over the store, with the intent to burn it down with her inside.

Fearing for Lexie’s safety (as she’s upstairs), Katie buys time by faking sympathy and agreeing to go back with him. When he lets his guard down, she pushes him into the water. A firework spark lands on the gasoline, igniting a fire that engulfs the store. Alex sees the burning store, quickly crosses the harbor by boat, and saves Lexie. Meanwhile, as Katie tries to fight off Kevin, she kills him by shooting him.

After the fire, Alex recovers several letters written by his late wife Carly before she died. They were prepared ahead of time for important events such as Josh's eighteenth birthday and Lexie's wedding day. He also reconciles with Josh.

Jo later tells Katie that she will be leaving Southport soon. Katie thanks her for being a good friend and Jo tells her, "You deserve this, Katie. You belong here."

Alex gives Katie a letter with the words "To Her" on the envelope. It explains that he must be in love to have given her the letter and she hopes that she feels the same, wishing that she could be there with them. Enclosed with the letter is a photo of Alex's late wife. Katie realizes that her neighbor "Jo" was the ghost of Carly watching over them.

== Cast ==
- Josh Duhamel as Alex Wheatley, Katie's new boyfriend and a widower who struggles to raise his two children after the death of his wife.
- Julianne Hough as Erin Tierney / Katie Feldman, a young woman who flees her abusive husband and Alex's new girlfriend.
- Cobie Smulders as Carly Wheatley / Jo, a local woman who befriends Katie.
- David Lyons as Det. Kevin Tierney, Katie's abusive husband.
- Noah Lomax as Josh Wheatley, Alex's son who has a rough and strained relationship with his father due to his mother's death.
- Mimi Kirkland as Lexie Wheatley, Alex's daughter who befriends Katie.
- Irene Ziegler as Mrs. Feldman
- Robin Mullins as Maddie
- Red West as Roger. This was West's last film role before his death in July 2017.
- Juan Carlos Piedrahita as Detective Ramirez
- Cullen Moss as Deputy Bass
- Mike Pniewski as Lieutenant Robinson

== Production ==
According to a 2012 Twitch Film article, Keira Knightley had entered into "early talks" to play Katie, but had to drop out due to scheduling conflicts with the 2013 film Begin Again.

The film began principal photography on June 18, 2012, in Wilmington and Southport, North Carolina. Parts of it were filmed in Louisiana and the opening scene with Katie on the Coach America bus is on the Linn Cove Viaduct along the Blue Ridge Parkway near Grandfather Mountain in Linville, North Carolina.

== Reception ==
=== Box office ===
Safe Haven grossed US$71,349,120 in North America and US$26,245,020 in other territories for a worldwide total of US$97,594,140.

In its opening weekend, the film grossed US$21,401,594, finishing third at the box office behind A Good Day to Die Hard (US$24,834,845) and Identity Thief (US$23,674,295).

=== Critical response ===
Critical reaction for Safe Haven was poor. On Rotten Tomatoes it has a rating of 13%, based on reviews from 146 critics, with an average rating of 4.00/10. The consensus reads, "Schmaltzy, predictable, and melodramatic, Safe Haven also suffers from a ludicrous plot twist, making for a particularly ignominious Nicholas Sparks adaptation." On Metacritic the film has a score of 34 out of 100 based on 33 reviews, indicating "generally unfavorable reviews". Audiences surveyed by CinemaScore gave the film a grade B+.

British film magazine Empire gave the film three out of five stars, writing: "She’s Katie, a mysterious girl on the run who conveniently ends up in a small town populated by beautiful, friendly people including Alex (Josh Duhamel), who also happens to be a widower. Thanks to their spirited performances, this is superior to other recent Sparks adaptations — the extra dash of mystery doesn’t hurt either. But it’s still firmly on the side of sentiment and implausible plot developments — perhaps secure in the knowledge that’s exactly what the fan base wants."

Richard Roeper called the film "Bat. Bleep. Crazy." and asks if the filmmakers or a key character is out of her mind. Roeper expresses disbelief at the twist ending, and "how insane the whole thing is". Aside from the twist ending he would have given the film 2.5 stars, but ultimately gives it only 1.5 out of four stars. Peter Bradshaw, writing for The Guardian, called Safe Haven's setting "a sugary vision of small-town America that does not correspond with the real world at any point." Peter Travers of Rolling Stone gave the film zero stars out of four, and concluded his review by stating: "I hate Safe Haven. It's a terrible thing to do to your Valentine."

=== Accolades ===
Safe Haven was nominated for a Teen Choice Awards in the category Choice Movie: Romance. Mimi Kirkland received a Young Artist Award nomination in the category "Best Supporting Young Actress in a Feature Film".

== Home media ==
Safe Haven was released on DVD and Blu-ray on May 7, 2013.

== See also ==
- Safe Haven (soundtrack)
