= That Song in My Head =

2008 single by Julianne Hough

Single by Julianne Hough

from the album Julianne Hough
- Released: March 3, 2008
- Genre: Country
- Length: 3:13
- Label: Mercury Nashville
- Songwriters: Jim Collins; Wendell Mobley; Tony Martin
- Producer: David Malloy

Julianne Hough singles chronology
"Will You Dance with Me" (2007)	"That Song in My Head" (2008)	"My Hallelujah Song" (2008)

"That Song in My Head" is a song written by Tony Martin, Wendell Mobley and Jim Collins, and recorded by American country music singer and professional dancer Julianne Hough. The song was released March 3, 2008 on as the first single from her self-titled debut album. It was a top 20 hit on the Billboard Hot Country Songs charts.

== Critical reception ==
The single was overall met with positive reviews from websites. Billboard said that the song was "marked by a sweet tone and warm texture. Slant Magazine said the single had "enthusiasm and charm".

== Music video ==
The music video takes place in two scenes, a beach party at night and a pier during daytime, the Ventura Pier in Ventura, California. The music video starts off with Hough on a boat with radio, remembering past memories. The video then goes back to a couple of days before when Hough was at the nighttime beach party, standing beside the truck from where her lover was dancing from, and dancing to the song on the radio. The video then goes to pier, showing Hough walking down the pier with a portable radio, watching the events that go on in the pier, including palm reading and a man breakdancing. The video regularly goes through both scenes throughout the course of the video. It then ends with Hough finding her lover at the end of the day beside the beach with the same truck. The two then kiss and soon after, the music video ends. It was directed by Trey Fanjoy.

== Chart performance ==
"That Song in My Head" debuted at number 51 on the U.S. Billboard Hot Country Songs chart on the chart week of March 5, 2008. The song reached the top 40 in its third week on that chart. The song soon reached the top 20 after being on the charts for over 20 weeks. It then debuted on the Billboard Hot 100 at number 88 the same week. The song reached a peak of number 18 on the country chart for the week of August 2, 2008.

Chart (2008)	Peak position
US Billboard Hot 100	88
US Hot Country Songs (Billboard)	18
