= Julianne Hough (album) =

Studio album by Julianne Hough
- Released: May 20, 2008
- Genre: Country
- Length: 38:38
- Label: Mercury Nashville
- Producer: David Malloy

Julianne Hough chronology
Julianne Hough (2008)	Sounds of the Season: The Julianne Hough Holiday Collection (2008)

Singles from Julianne Hough
- 1. "That Song in My Head" Released: March 3, 2008; 2. "My Hallelujah Song" Released: September 22, 2008

Professional ratings
Review scores
Source	Rating
Allmusic	2/5 stars
Slant	2/5 stars
Country Weekly	3.5/5 stars

Julianne Hough is the debut album studio by American country music singer, and professional dancer, Julianne Hough. The album was released on May 20, 2008 on Mercury Nashville Records.

After its release, the album debuted at #3 on the Billboard 200, selling about 67,000 copies during its first week. The album was produced by David Malloy. Hough's debut album also debuted at #1 on the Billboard Top Country Albums chart May 28, 2008.

The lead single off the album, "That Song in My Head", was released the week of March 3, 2008, and peaked at number 18 on that chart. "My Hallelujah Song" was released as the second single on September 22, peaking at number 44 and the music video was ranked number 48 on GAC's Top 50 Videos of the Year list.

== Track listing ==
No.	Title	Writer(s)	Length
1.	"That Song in My Head"	Jim Collins, Tony Martin, Wendell Mobley	3:13
2.	"You, You, You"	Rick Ferrell, Jennifer Hicks	3:45
3.	"Hide Your Matches"	Hillary Lindsey, Scooter Carusoe	3:40
4.	"My Hallelujah Song"	Craig Wiseman, Steve McEwan	3:30
5.	"Jimmy Ray McGee"	David Frasier, Josh Kear	3:31
6.	"Dreaming Under the Same Moon" (duet with Derek Hough)	Tim Johnson, Marabeth Poole, David Malloy	3:58
7.	"About Life"	Marcel, Trevor Rosen, Jessica Andrews	3:17
8.	"Hello"	Marty Dodson, Tom Shapiro, Rebecca Lynn Howard	3:10
9.	"Help Me, Help You"	Danny Green, Catt Gravitt	4:01
10.	"Love Yourself"	Mark Irwin, Malloy, Kear	3:02
11.	"I'd Just Be with You"	John Kennedy, Andrea Stople	3:31

== Chart positions ==
=== Weekly charts ===
Chart (2008)	Peak position
US Billboard 200	3
US Top Country Albums (Billboard)	1

=== Year-end charts ===
Chart (2008)	Position
US Billboard 200	194
US Top Country Albums (Billboard)	30
Chart (2009)	Position
US Top Country Albums (Billboard)	60

Singles – Billboard

Year	Single	Chart Positions		
Year	Single	US Country	US	US Pop
2008	"That Song in My Head"	18	88	84
2008	"My Hallelujah Song"	44	—	—

== Personnel ==
Musicians

- Spady Brannan — bass guitar
- Mike Brignardello — bass guitar
- Bob Britt — electric guitar
- Mickey Jack Cones — background vocals
- Eric Darken — percussion
- Glen Duncan — percussion
- Paul Franklin — steel guitar
- Tatiana Hanchero — background vocals
- Derek Hough — duet vocals on "Dreaming Under the Same Moon"
- Julianne Hough — lead vocals
- Mike Johnson — steel guitar
- Troy Lancaster — electric guitar
- B. James Lowry — acoustic guitar
- Jerry McPherson — electric guitar
- Jimmy Nichols — keyboards, Hammond B-3 organ, piano, background vocals
- Karyn Rochelle — background vocals
- Jimmie Lee Sloas — bass guitar
- Ilya Toshinsky — acoustic guitar
- Lonnie Wilson — drums
- Jonathan Yudkin — fiddle, strings

Technical

- Adam Ayan — mastering
- Jake Bailey — makeup
- Ondrea Barbe — photography
- Tonya Ginnetti — production assistant
- Campbell McAuley — hair
- Karen Naff — art direction, design
- Chari Pirtle — production assistant
- Julie Weiss — wardrobe stylist
