= Is That So Wrong =

Single by Julianne Hough

from the album Wildfire
- Released: June 21, 2010
- Genre: Country
- Length: 3:32
- Label: Mercury Nashville
- Songwriter(s): Sarah Buxton; Blair Daly; Julianne Hough
- Producer(s): Dann Huff

Julianne Hough singles chronology
"My Hallelujah Song" (2008)	"Is That So Wrong" (2010)

"Is That So Wrong" is a song co-written and recorded by American country artist Julianne Hough. It was released on June 21, 2010 as the lead-off single to her second studio album, Wildfire, which was expected for release in November 2010, but ultimately went unreleased.

== Content ==
"Is That So Wrong" is a moderate up-tempo song, backed by electric guitar and percussion with steel guitar fills. The song's female narrator has just experienced a breakup and describes the longing for someone to fill that vacancy. In the chorus, she finds herself explaining her desire to find a fast replacement, and asking of others: "I don't want to be alone / Is that so wrong?" It was written by Hough with Sarah Buxton and Blair Daly.

Hough described the process of writing the song in a behind the scenes video of making her second album. "Blair [Daly] was playing this riff and I said 'let's write a song about how I just got out of a relationship, and I don't want anything really, but I just want to like have somebody there.'" Hough's breakup with Chuck Wicks, a fellow country artist she had been dating for over a year, influenced the new single.

== Reception ==
Matt Bjorke of Roughstock reviewed the song positively as a radio-friendly track that sheds the dated production of her debut record and embraces "the 'current; sound that Julianne Hough needed to set herself back on the path to country music stardom." He also commented that Hough turns in a "strong, able vocal performance" and positively noted the influences of co-writer Sarah Buxton.

== Music video ==
The music video, which was directed by Adam Shankman, premiered on CMT on June 23, 2010. In the video, Hough is shown carrying some items from her car to her apartment, but on the way she bumps into a man walking his dog. They smile at each other and continue on, with Hough going up to her apartment, where she begins to dance on her furniture and all around her living space. Upon hearing someone at her door, she opens it to find the man she bumped into previously with a bouquet of flowers.

In December 2010, Hough told an audience that the video had been deemed too racy and was removed from CMT. Despite Hough's statement, CMT told CNN the video, along with videos from Lee Ann Womack and Sugarland, were removed due to contract negotiation problems.
