= Sounds of the Season: The Julianne Hough Holiday Collection =

EP by Julianne Hough
- Released: October 12, 2008
- Length: 21:00
- Label: Mercury Nashville
- Producer: David Malloy

Julianne Hough chronology
Julianne Hough (2008)	Sounds of the Season: The Julianne Hough Holiday Collection (2008)

Sounds of the Season: The Julianne Hough Holiday Collection is a Christmas themed EP released by country music artist Julianne Hough. Released on October 12, 2008, the EP was available for purchase only at the American discount department store chain Target. The album contains two original tracks, "Sounds of Christmas" and "Christmas Memories".

In early 2009, the album peaked at #2 on the Hot Country Albums chart.

The EP was released on iTunes under the name The Julianne Hough Holiday Collection on March 9, 2016.

== Track listing ==
No.	Title	Writer(s)	Length
1.	"Sounds of Christmas" (instrumental track)	Julianne Hough; Jimmy Nichols	1:08
2.	"Jingle Bell Rock"	Joseph Carleton Beal; James Ross Boothe	2:23
3.	"Feliz Navidad"	José Feliciano	3:29
4.	"It Wasn't His Child / Mary, Did You Know?" (medley featuring Phil Vassar)	Donald Ralph Ewing / Mark Lowry; Buddy Greene	4:17
5.	"Santa Baby"	Joan Javits; Philip Springer; Tony Springer	2:55
6.	"Rockin' Around the Christmas Tree"	Johnny Marks	1:56
7.	"Christmas Memories"	Julianne Hough; Ilya Toshinsky	0:58
8.	"Have Yourself a Merry Little Christmas"	Hugh Martin; Ralph Blane	3:53
Total length:			20:59

== Charts ==
=== Weekly charts ===
Chart (2008)	Peak position
US Billboard 200	24
US Top Country Albums (Billboard)	2
US Top Holiday Albums (Billboard)	2

=== Year-end charts ===
Chart (2009)	Position
US Top Country Albums (Billboard)	43
