= Eric Lodal =

American screenwriter (born 1976)

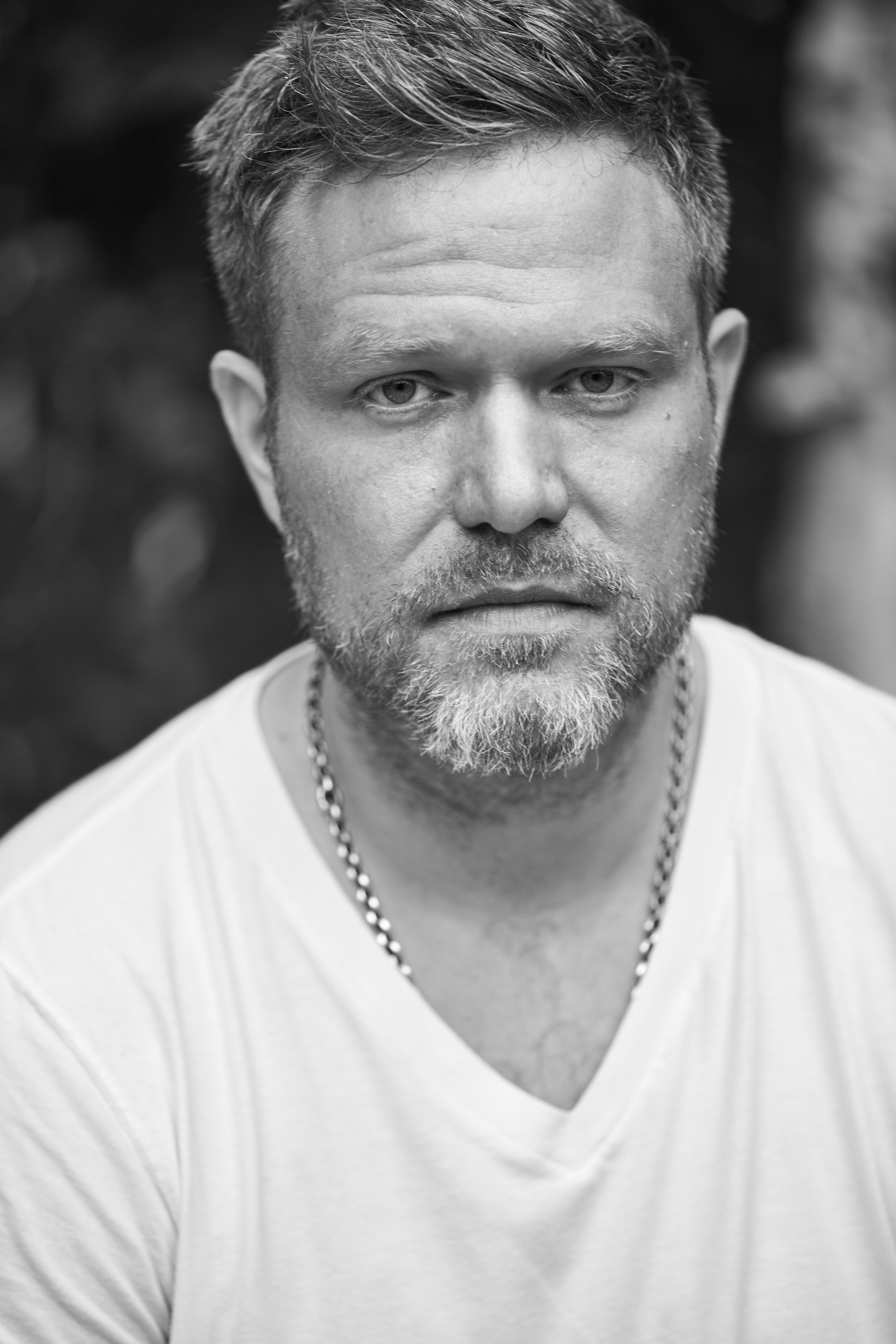
- Born: Eric Olaf Lodal; January 30, 1976 (age 50); Washington, DC, U.S.
- Education: Yale University, Juilliard School
- Occupations: screenwriter, producer, director, classical musician, entrepreneur, political strategist
- Years active: 2005–present
- Notable work: Murder in the First, The Locrian Mode, Simple City

Eric Olaf Lodal (born January 30, 1976) is an American screenwriter, creator, producer, musician, and director. He has written and developed original television series and feature films for Warner Brothers, F/X, TNT, Fox Studios, Sonar, Sony and New Regency.

He is noted for co-creating and showrunning Murder in the First an American crime drama television series that originally aired on TNT. The series stars Tom Felton, Taye Diggs, Kathleen Robertson, James Cromwell, and others.

Outside entertainment, Lodal is a political consultant and an active investor.

As an entrepreneur he has founded several successful businesses, including Evolution Music LLC, Idea Cartel, Olaf Inc., Lonesome Pine Productions LLC and his current venture, Lodestar MG LLC based in Aspen, Colorado.

== Early life and education ==
Lodal was born in Washington, D.C., and raised in Northern Virginia. He spent his early years engaged in a number of diverse pursuits, ranging from classical music to politics and investment banking. An Eagle Scout, All State Football player and Virginia Academic Player of the Year (1994), as well as a classically trained opera singer, Lodal has performed as a soloist at Carnegie Hall, with the New York City Opera, and was featured on NPR's "World of Opera". He has also worked in hip-hop and other genres and was the first Opera singer to be featured on a major rap album when he was featured on IDK's track "A Boy's Innocence."

Lodal studied economics and music at Yale University, graduating with a B.A. in 1998. While at Yale he briefly played football, and sang with the Whiffenpoofs. Famously, Lodal assisted Yale College Dean Betty Trachtenberg during a disruption to secret-society and Whiffenpoof Tap Night traditions that drew campus press coverage. After touring the world with the Whiffs, he proceeded to New York City after being accepted into the Master's of Music degree program at the Juilliard School. As a student at Juillard he starred in multiple productions at Lincoln Center including Juilliard Opera Theater's performances of L'étoile

Lodal was also named an "American Fellow" at the Aspen Music Festival in 2000, where he starred as Nick Shadow in the NPR "World of Opera" and AOTC production of "The Rake's Progress" by Igor Stravinsky.

== Early career ==
While at Juilliard, Lodal worked as an analyst at KPS (KPS Special Situations Fund), reporting to co-founder Eugene Keilin.

After Juilliard, Lodal served as Communications Director for former Governor of Virginia and current US Senator Tim Kaine.

== Film and television career ==
Lodal's short film The Locrian Mode (2005) screened at international festivals and was an opening-night selection at the 2006 Beverly Hills Film Festival. He subsequently developed original pilots and features with Warner Bros., F/X, TNT, Fox, Sony Pictures Television, and New Regency.

== Murder In The First ==
"There aren't a lot of smart, occult-free crime thrillers this summer, and that makes 'Murder in the First' all the more enjoyable," wrote New York Times critic Alessandra Stanley.

Set in San Francisco, the show follows a single case across an entire season. The series aired for three seasons from June 9, 2014 to September 4, 2016 and is now streaming on Apple TV, YouTube, Amazon Prime and Fandango.

Murder in the First co-created, written, and Executive Produced by Lodal, became a hit over its debut summer, averaging over 5 million viewers a week and dominating summer on-demand numbers for TNT. It was reportedly the most "binged watched" series for Time Warner that summer, which earned the series a second season.

Legendary LA Times TV critic Mary McNamara said in her front-page review of the series, "Let the other shows fiddle with their tonal hemlines, structural silhouettes and genre blends; creators Steven Bochco and Eric Lodal are sticking with the classics, and it's a very good look for summer."

=== Style and reception ===
Industry coverage has described Lodal's writing as "cinematic" with "moral intensity," combining procedural realism with character-driven subtext. In the Center Maryland interview, Lodal discussed approaching scenes "like music," a habit attributed to his formal vocal training.

== Current and upcoming work ==
Lodal has also developed TV series with William Broyles Jr. (Laredo), Stephen Gaghan (Search and Rescue), Michael Eisner (Bel Canto), and Michael De Luca (Simple City), amongst others.

== Kelloff Campaign ==
In 2025, 24 years after his last formal political role as Senator Tim Kaine's (VA) first Communications Director, Lodal reentered professional politics when he was named Campaign Chair and Senior Advisor to current Colorado congressional candidate Alex Kelloff and oversaw the launch of his campaign in the highly competitive 3rd District of Colorado, recently held by Lauren Boebert. In explaining Kelloff's run, Lodal was quoted in the Aspen Times, saying, "There's a lack of leadership nationwide, and that's the void Alex is stepping into — not with slogans but with serious ideas and the guts to get things done. He knows the moment, and he's ready to meet it.".

== Personal life ==
Lodal divides his time between Aspen, Colorado, New York, NY, Grasse, France and Los Angeles, California. He is the son of Jan Martin Lodal, a former U.S. Principal Deputy Under Secretary of Defense (Policy) and past president of the Atlantic Council, and Elizabeth Lodal, an educator and former principal of Thomas Jefferson High School for Science and Technology, which U.S. News and World Report ranked as the number one high school in America over her tenure. His daughter, Wesley Lodal, is an accomplished singer and musician and middle school student at Aspen Country Day School in Aspen, Colorado.
