= Safe Haven (novel) =

2010 novel by Nicholas Sparks

- Author: Nicholas Sparks
- Language: English
- Genre: Realism; Romance
- Publisher: Grand Central Publishing
- Publication date: September 2, 2010
- Publication place: United States
- Media type: Print (Hardcover, Paperback)
- Pages: 432
- ISBN: 978-0446547598

Safe Haven is a romantic fantasy novel by American novelist Nicholas Sparks. It was published in 2010. According to WorldCat, the book is held in 2242 libraries.

== Plot ==
Erin flees her abusive alcoholic husband, Kevin, takes on a different identity and changes her name to Katie. She arrives in Southport, North Carolina. Finding work at a seafood restaurant, she becomes friends with her neighbor, Jo, and gets to know the town's general store owner, Alex.

Katie is interested in Alex, who is a widower with two children. Alex and Katie's relationship becomes romantic, encouraged by Jo. Alex's former job had trained him to recognize signs of an abuse victim. Katie reveals her past to Alex, who wants to know why she did not go seek help from the police. She explains that Kevin is a police detective. She fled from his abuse because she knew he would kill her if he located her. Her created identity is based on a neighbor's dead daughter who resembled her.

Kevin is furious with his wife for leaving and drank more to dull his pain. He learns of Erin's new identity and searches for her. Kevin arrives in Southport, while Katie is caring for Alex's children. Kevin sets the house on fire, thinking it would kill both Katie and Alex. She fights Kevin, and the children escape. Alex, arriving home, finds his children and takes them to Katie's house where he thinks they will be safe. He returns to the fire and finds Kevin attempting to harm Katie. Desperate, Alex drives toward Kevin who is firing a gun at him. The vehicle hits Kevin, breaking his hand and disarming him. Katie retrieves Kevin's gun, and she and Alex are reunited. Kevin, however, is able to drive away. He goes to Katie's house. When she learns that Alex left the children at her house, she is terrified, knowing that Kevin will hunt her down at her house, putting the children's lives in danger. As they reach Katie's house, Kevin attacks Alex with a crowbar. Kevin is going to shoot and kill Katie, but when he fires the gun, the bullet hits Kevin in the stomach and he dies in front of Katie.

Alex had been given an unopened letter from his dead wife, Carly. After he and Katie recover from their injuries, they locate the safe in the ashes of the burnt home. He gives Katie the unopened letter to read. She goes home to read it and is shocked when she sees Jo's house looking like no one had ever lived in it. Startled, she begins to think that Jo had been a complete figment of her imagination. Upon reading the letter, Katie realizes that it was written by Alex's late wife, Carly Jo, whom friends called "Jo". Katie realizes that her friend Jo was really Carly's spirit. In the letter, Carly Jo asked Katie to take care of Alex and the children. After Katie reads the letter, she sees lights in her neighbor's house and Jo standing in the window, waving farewell. The next time she glances at Jo's house, it is dark and has returned to the appearance that no one has lived in the house for years.

== Adaptation ==
Safe Haven was adapted into a feature film in 2013. The film was directed by Lasse Hallström. It starred Julianne Hough as Katie, Josh Duhamel as Alex, David Lyons as Kevin, and Cobie Smulders as Jo.
