= Julianne Hough =

American dancer and actress (born 1988)

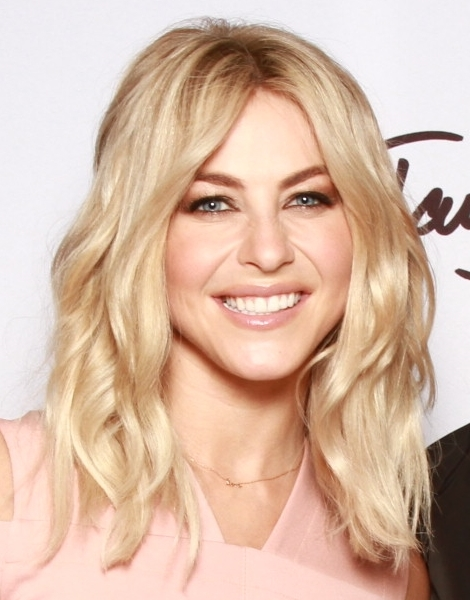
- Hough in 2016
- Born: Julianne Alexandra Hough; July 20, 1988 (age 38); Orem, Utah, U.S.
- Education: Italia Conti Academy of Theatre Arts
- Occupations: Dancer; singer; actress; television personality
- Years active: 2001–present
- Spouse: Brooks Laich (m. 2017; div. 2022)
- Relatives: Derek Hough (brother)

Julianne Alexandra Hough (/hʌf/ huff; born July 20, 1988) is an American dancer, singer, actress and television personality. In 2007, she joined the cast of ABC's Dancing with the Stars as a professional dancer, winning two seasons with her celebrity partners. After leaving the show in 2009, she returned in 2014 to serve as a judge, a position she held until 2017. She received three Primetime Emmy Award nominations for her work on the series, winning once in 2015 with her brother, Derek Hough.

Hough made her acting debut in the 2001 film Harry Potter and the Philosopher's Stone, but played her first major role in the 2010 film Burlesque, which was followed with leading roles as Ariel in Footloose (2011), Sherrie in Rock of Ages (2012), and Katie in Safe Haven (2013). Hough portrayed Sandy in the 2016 live Fox television production of Grease. She also served as a judge on America's Got Talent for its 14th season. In 2023, Hough returned to Dancing with the Stars as co-host, alongside main host Alfonso Ribeiro.

On stage, she made her Broadway theater debut in the political farce POTUS: Or, Behind Every Great Dumbass Are Seven Women Trying to Keep Him Alive (2022). She has hosted The Tony Awards: Act One in 2022, 2023 and 2024.

== Early life and education ==
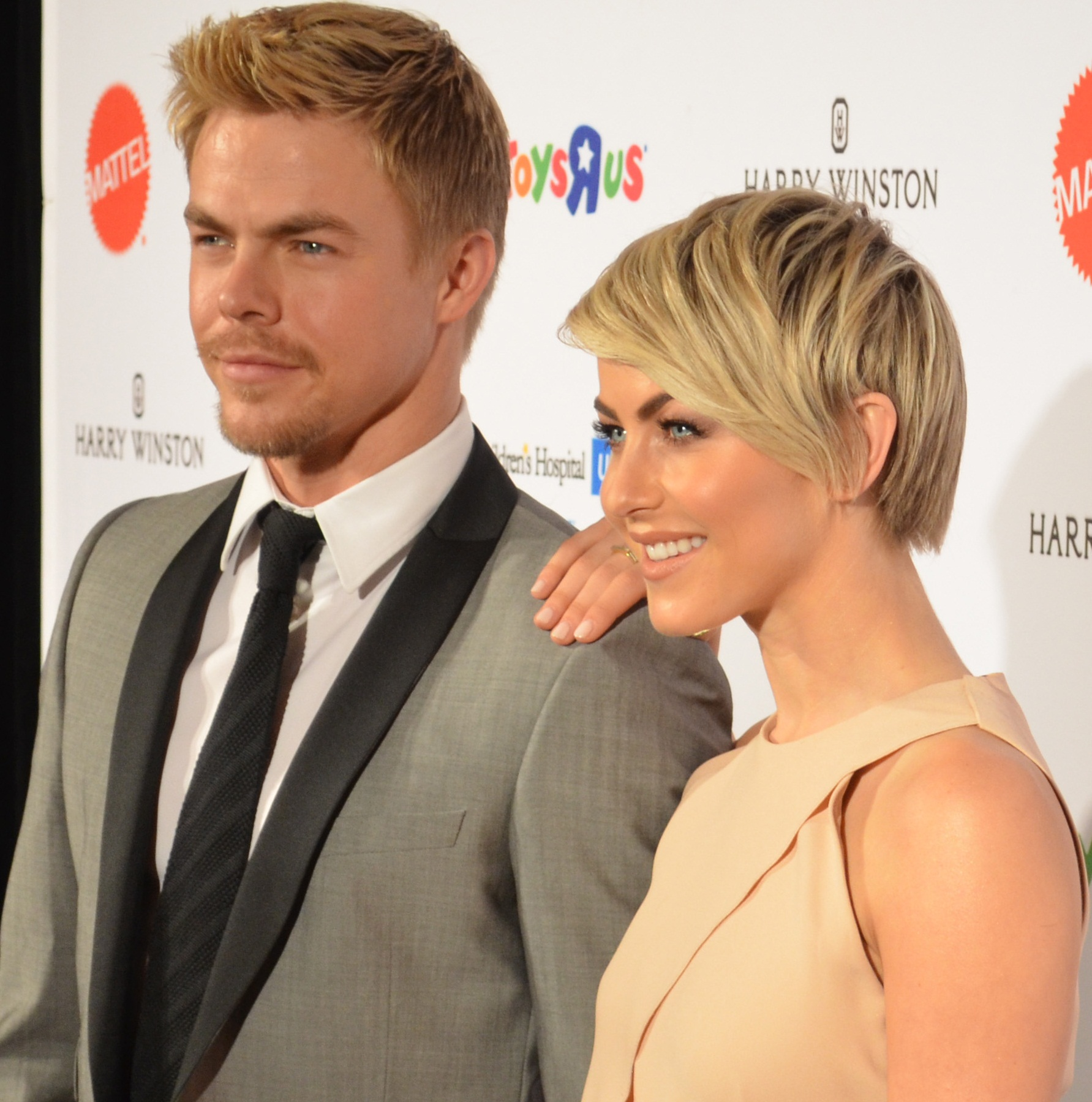
Hough and her brother Derek at the 2014 Kaleidoscope Ball

Julianne Alexandra Hough was born on July 20, 1988, in Orem, Utah, the youngest of five children in a Mormon family. Her parents are Bruce and Marianne Hough; her father was twice chairman of the Utah Republican Party and ran for Utah's 2nd congressional district in 2023. Her brother, Derek, is also a professional dancer. She has three older sisters. All four of Hough's grandparents were dancers. She is a second cousin of musicians Riker, Rydel, Rocky, Ryland, and Ross Lynch from the band R5; their maternal grandmothers are sisters.

Hough's formal training began at the Center Stage Performing Arts Studio in Orem. She began dancing competitively at nine. The next year, Hough's parents, who were divorcing, sent her and her brother to London, where they lived and studied with their coaches, Corky and Shirley Ballas, alongside their son, Mark. They continued their studies at the Italia Conti Academy of Theatre Arts, and received training in song, theatre, gymnastics and various forms of dance, including jazz, ballet, and tap.

When Hough was 12, the three children formed their own pop music trio 2B1G ("2 Boys, 1 Girl"). They performed at dance competitions in the UK and the U.S., and were showcased in a UK television show. At 15, Hough became the youngest dancer, and the only American, to win both Junior World Latin Champion and International Latin Youth Champion at the Blackpool Dance Festival. After returning to the U.S., she attended the Las Vegas Academy and Alta High School.

== Career ==
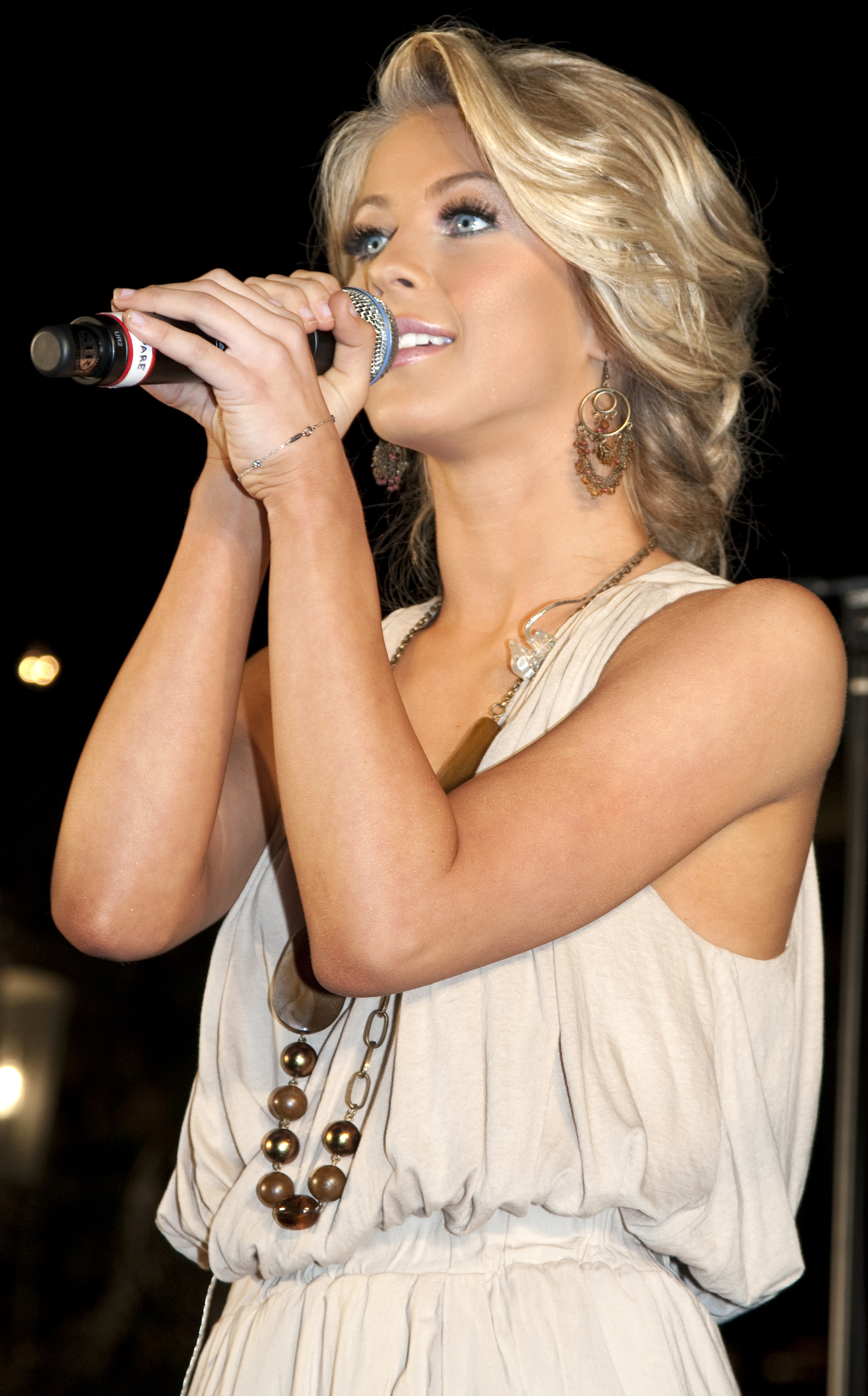
Hough performing in March 2009

Hough was one of the Million Dollar Dancers in the 2006 ABC game show called Show Me the Money. She won season four of the U.S. edition of Dancing with the Stars with her partner, Olympic gold medal-winning speed skater Apolo Ohno, making Hough the youngest professional dancer to win on the program. On November 27, 2007, Hough and her partner, three-time Indianapolis 500 champion Hélio Castroneves, became the winners of season five. Hough returned for season six with radio host/comedian Adam Carolla, but they were eliminated in week four. In July 2008, Hough was nominated at the 60th Primetime Emmy Awards in the category of "Outstanding Choreography" for her mambo "Para Los Rumberos" (performed with partner Hélio Castroneves) on Dancing with the Stars.

On August 25, 2008, the cast of season seven was announced, and Hough was partnered with Hannah Montana actor Cody Linley. She felt abdominal pains during their jitterbug performance on October 21, 2008, and she was rushed to a hospital 40 minutes after the encore performance. She subsequently had surgery to have her appendix removed after being diagnosed with endometriosis, causing her to miss several performances. Edyta Śliwińska stood in for her. Hough returned to the show, but the pair were eliminated in the semi-finals. She appeared on the November 12 results show dancing the jive to "Great Balls of Fire" with her brother for the "Design-A-Dance" contest.

On November 20, 2008, Hough was on Ryan Seacrest's radio show, On Air with Ryan Seacrest. She announced that, in order to further her music career, she would not be returning to Dancing with the Stars for the foreseeable future. However, she did return for one final time in season eight, partnering with country singer Chuck Wicks. They were voted off in week eight of the competition and came in sixth place. They then began dating after the season was over. On October 11, 2011, Hough returned to Dancing with the Stars and danced with her Footloose co-star Kenny Wormald twice, and with her brother. She returned again on May 15, 2012, in a dance performance to promote her film Rock of Ages. On October 7, 2013, she was guest judge in place of Len Goodman, which was the first time a former pro dancer came back to judge. In September 2014, she returned as a permanent judge on the panel, a position she held until 2017. She returned to the show as a guest judge in 2021, filling in for her brother Derek.

On March 20, 2023, it was announced that Hough would join Dancing with the Stars as the new co-host, following Tyra Banks's departure, and that previous co-host Alfonso Ribeiro would assume Banks's old role as emcee.

=== Move Live On Tour ===
On March 18, 2014, Hough and her brother Derek announced a summer tour of over 40 cities across the U.S. and Canada, called "Move Live on Tour", which would include dancing and singing from both of them, and the appearance of a group of dancers employed by the Houghs who earned their jobs through auditions. They embarked on the sold-out tour on May 25, 2014, in Park City, Kansas, and ended it in Los Angeles on July 26, 2014. Due to the success of ticket sales and several sold-out venues before the tour had officially kicked off, several more shows were added to the tour schedule, which also sold out. For the tour choreography, the Hough siblings collaborated with Nappytabs.

Following the success of the 2014 tour and high demand, the Houghs announced the return of "Move Live on Tour" in the summer of 2015. Spanning from June 12, 2015, to August 8, 2015, the sold-out tour visited over 40 cities throughout the U.S. and Canada, and visited larger venues than in the previous year. Tabitha and Napoleon D'umo "Nappytabs" returned as collaborating choreographers alongside the Hough siblings. Auditions were also held to recruit a new group of dancers to join the Houghs, although some back-up dancers from the previous year returned.

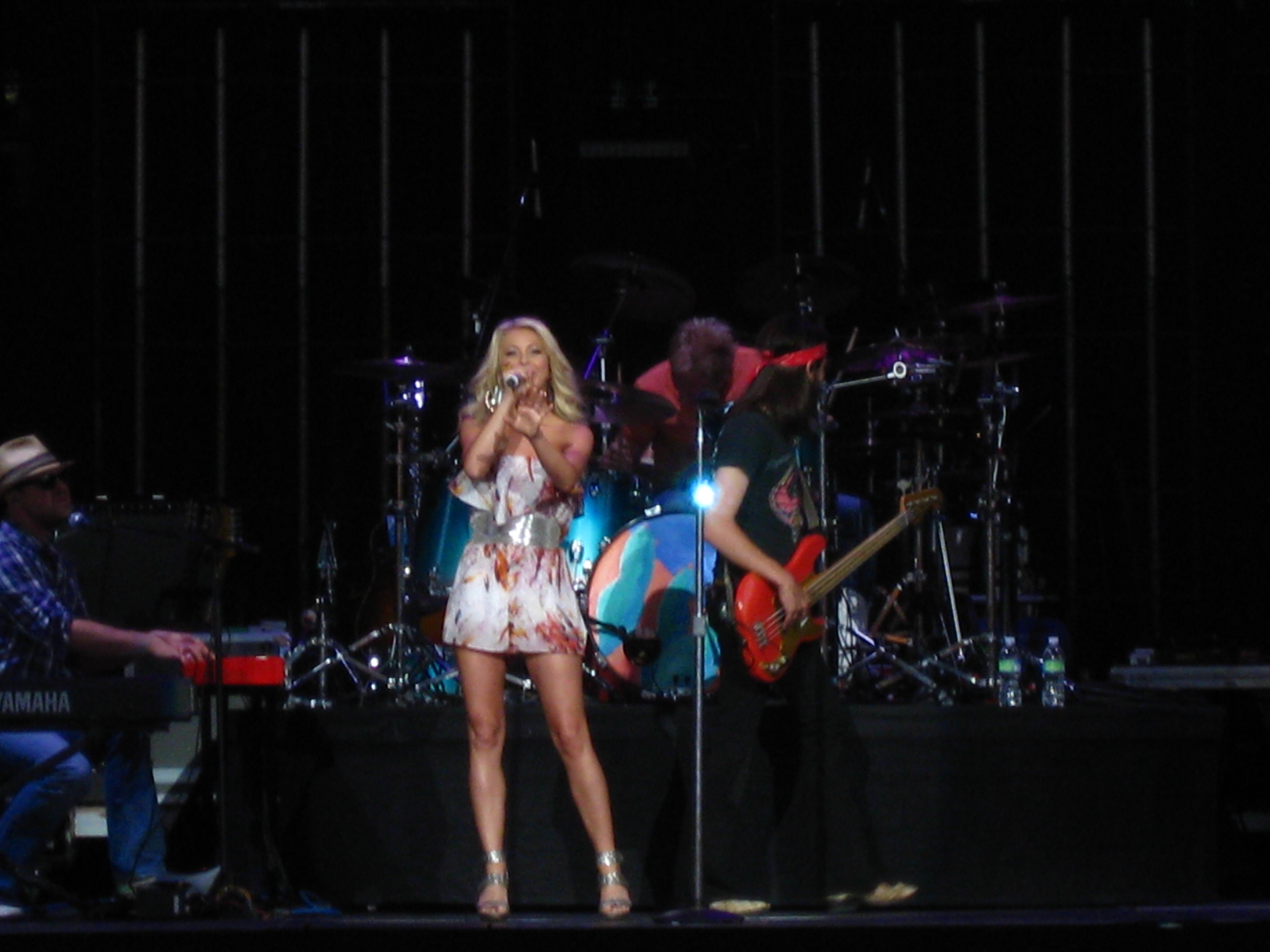
Hough performing at a George Strait Concert in 2009

On December 14, 2016, they announced, via social media, that they would be going on a new tour, "MOVE BEYOND Live on Tour", in 2017.

=== Music ===
Hough's first country-music single, "Will You Dance With Me", was released to iTunes and Wal-Mart in May 2007 to raise money for the American Red Cross. The song placed at number 100 on the Billboard Pop 100 chart. She later signed with Universal Music Group Nashville's Mercury Nashville division.

Her 2008 self-titled debut album was recorded in Nashville and produced by David Malloy, who has worked with Reba McEntire and Eddie Rabbitt, among others. Hough's album, which met with mixed reviews, debuted at number one on the Top Country Albums chart on May 31, and also peaked at number three on the Billboard 200. Hough's second single, and the first to be released to country radio, was "That Song in My Head".

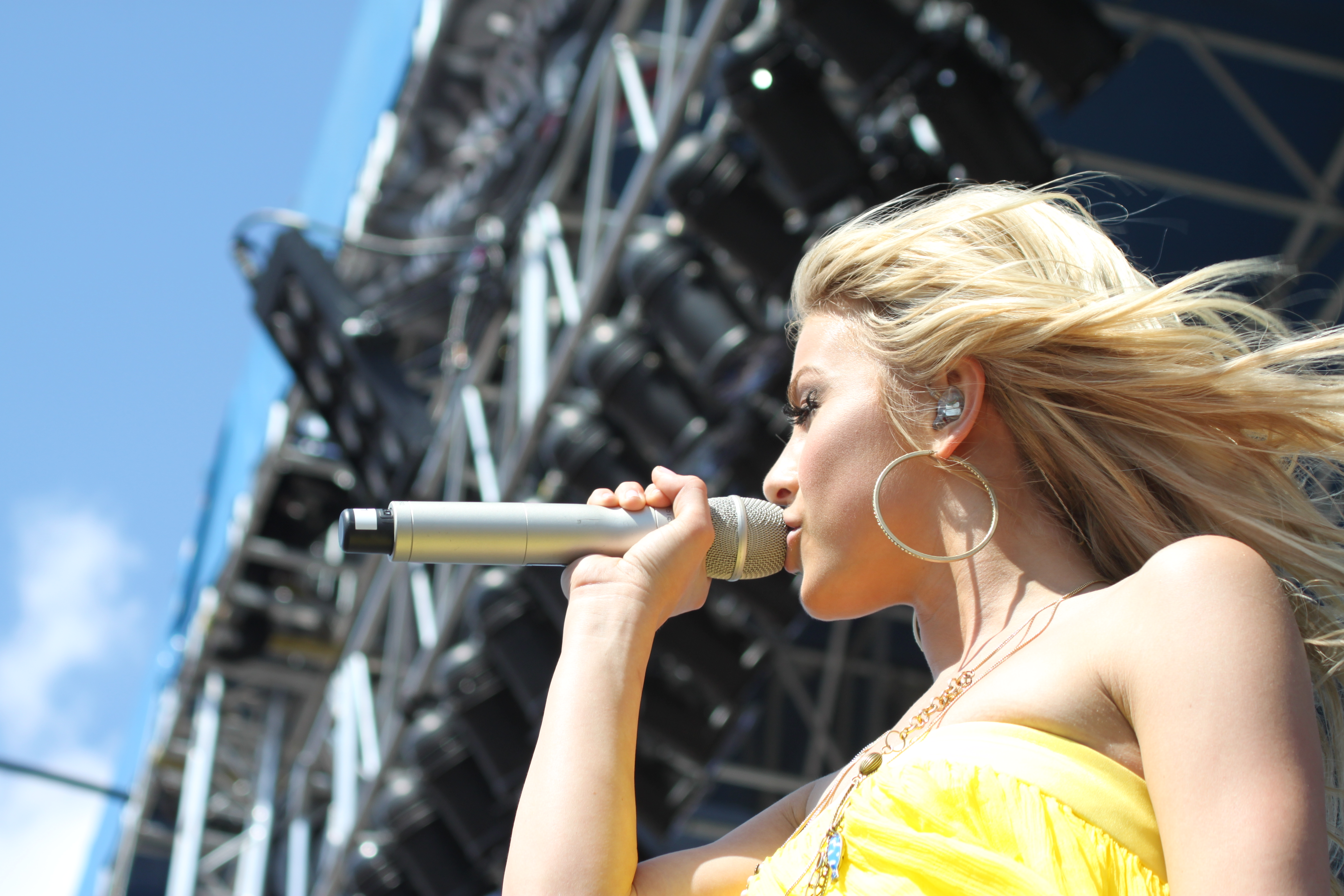
Hough performing at a 2009 Birthday Bash concert

Hough joined Brad Paisley's 2008 Tour, along with Jewel and Chuck Wicks. Hough, Paisley, and Willie Nelson appeared in the video for the Snoop Dogg song "My Medicine".

Hough appeared in a Juicy Fruit commercial in the fall of 2008, and released an EP of Christmas music called Sounds of the Season: The Julianne Hough Holiday Collection. She performed her second single "My Hallelujah Song" on Dancing With the Stars on November 18, 2008, with her brother Derek Hough, Mark Ballas, and Lacey Schwimmer dancing.

Hough, LeAnn Rimes, Jessica Simpson, and Kellie Pickler announced the 2009 Academy of Country Music Award nominees in February 2009. Hough was nominated for the Top New Female Vocalist award, a fan-voted award, which she subsequently won. Hough won the Top New Artist award at the 44th Annual Academy of Country Music Awards on April 5, 2009, and released a single, "Is That So Wrong", to country radio on June 21, 2010. It was intended as the lead single for her second album, Wildfire, but the album was never released.

In June 2012, Hough told AOL's The Boot that her second album was "completely done" and that she was initially "really, really looking forward to the record." However, she also stated that, due to the underperforming lead single and having "a lot of momentum" in her film career, no plans have been made to release Wildfire. She does intend to resume focusing on her music career at some point, though: "I feel like when I have the time to focus on it, and when I feel like it is the right time, [I'll return to] my music," she said. Hough's manager, Scott Siman also represents Tim McGraw.

=== Acting and other appearances ===
Hough's first acting role was in the 2001 feature film Harry Potter and the Philosopher's Stone, in an uncredited role as a "Hogwarts schoolgirl". She appeared in the 2010 musical Burlesque, starring Cher and Christina Aguilera. In the film, which chronicles a small-town girl (Aguilera) who finds success at a Los Angeles burlesque club, Hough plays a dancer named Georgia.

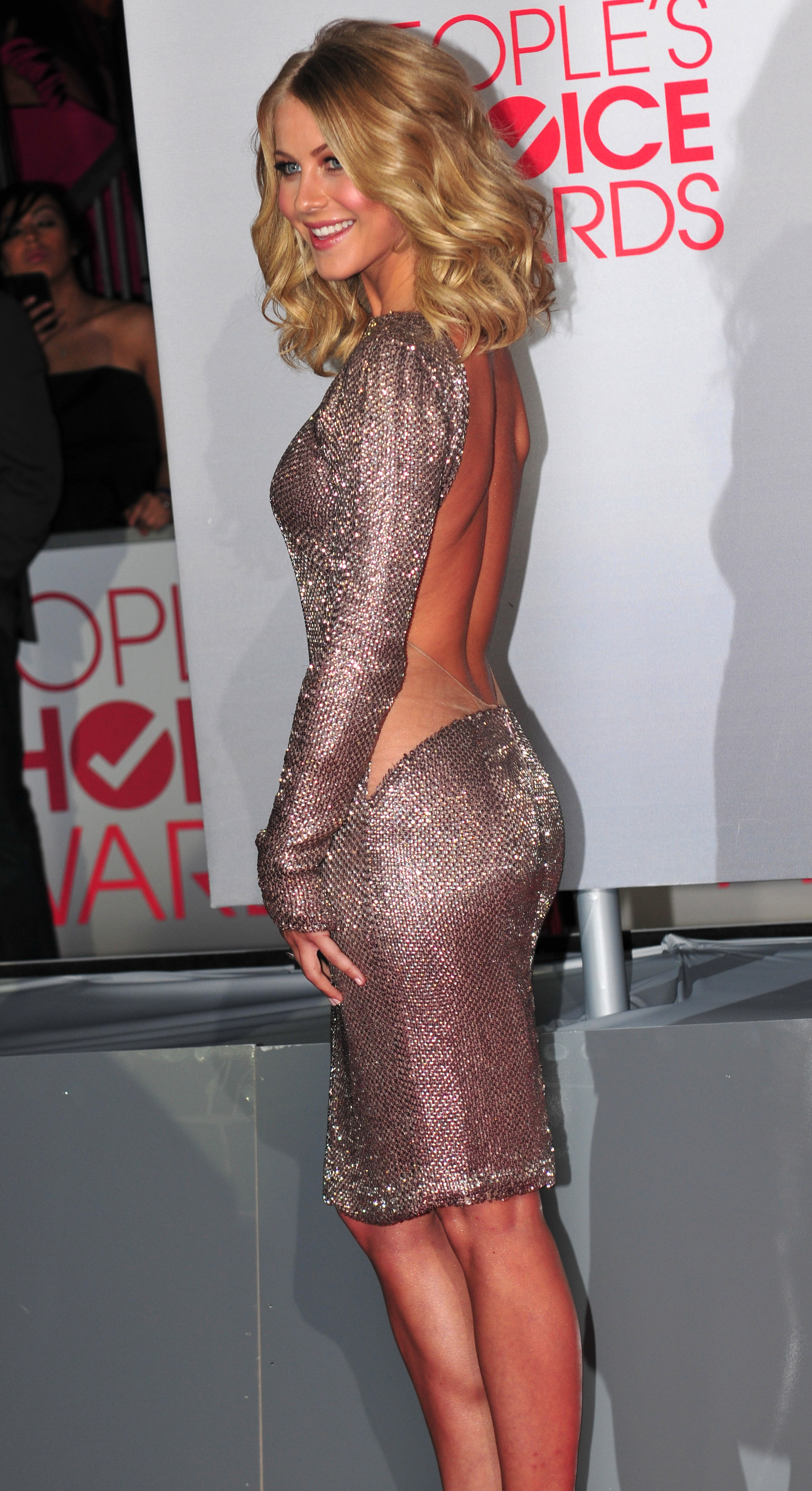
Julianne Hough at the 38th People's Choice Award, 2012

Hough's first leading role was as Ariel Moore in the 2011 remake of the Paramount film Footloose, opposite Kenny Wormald as Ren McCormack. Filming began in September 2010. The film was released on October 14, 2011. Hough played the role of Sherrie Christian in the 2012 film adaptation of the Broadway musical Rock of Ages, alongside Tom Cruise, Catherine Zeta-Jones and Malin Akerman. That same year she filmed her starring role opposite Josh Duhamel in the romantic drama Safe Haven, based on the novel of the same name by Nicholas Sparks, which was released on February 14, 2013. Hough also starred in the comedy-drama Paradise as Lamb Mannerheim, which was released on October 18, 2013. She starred alongside Russell Brand, who had previously co-starred with Hough in Rock of Ages.

Hough starred as protagonist Mallory Rutledge in the 2015 thriller film Curve opposite Teddy Sears. In the same year she appeared on business coach Lewis Howes's podcast where they had a discussion and it ended with him asking to salsa dance with her. Hough returned to musical performances portraying the role of Sandy Young for Fox's live television presentation of the musical Grease on January 31, 2016. Hough and brother Derek hosted the 2016 The Wonderful World of Disney: Magical Holiday Celebration and The Disney Parks' Magical Christmas Celebration. It was televised by ABC on Thanksgiving night, November 24, and Christmas Day, December 25. The Hough siblings introduced performances by Garth Brooks, Trisha Yearwood and Kelly Clarkson. A companion holiday album, Disney Channel Holiday Hits, was released November 18, 2016.

In 2018, she was cast as Jolene in the episode of the same name from the Netflix anthology series Heartstrings, based on the Dolly Parton song. On February 11, 2019, it was announced that Hough had joined the NBC talent competition series America's Got Talent. However, she was announced to be exiting in November 22 in the same year after one season.

In 2020, Hough partnered with entertainment company Meet Cute for a three-part Transformation podcast series. Meet Cute, along with Hough's production banner, Canary House Productions, wrote, executive produced, and voice acted in the series. As the title of the series suggests, Transformation aligns with Canary House's mission to impact lives through stories of transformation, self-discovery and identity.

=== Broadway debut ===
Hough made her Broadway debut as Dusty in Selina Fillinger's comedic play POTUS: Or, Behind Every Great Dumbass Are Seven Women Trying to Keep Him Alive. Performances began on April 14, 2022, at the Shubert Theatre. Hough received rave reviews for her comic performance with Entertainment Weekly declaring, "Julianne Hough is particularly mesmerizing...[she] could easily be a mere stereotype, but she surprises at every turn."

Hough hosted the first hour of the 75th Tony Awards alongside Darren Criss which was aired on Paramount+. The New York Times praised her hosting capabilities writing, "[she] delighted us with her endearing eagerness to put on a show." Critic Elizabeth Vincentelli also praised her adding, "she who didn't miss a step...[she] had a sparkly showbiz quality peppered with an adorably enthusiastic nerdiness". She also presented Best Book of a Musical on the main telecast which aired on CBS. She has since returned hosting the "Act One" Pre-Show Tony Awards in 2023 with Skylar Astin and in 2024 with Utkarsh Ambudkar.

== Personal life ==
In October 2013, Hough told the New York Post that although she was no longer a practicing Mormon, she was glad that she was raised in the church.

Hough dated fellow country singer Chuck Wicks from August 2008 to November 2009; when the two had a mutual break-up, it inspired Hough's song "Is That So Wrong". Hough dated Ryan Seacrest from April 2010 to March 2013. In February 2014, it was revealed that she had begun dating NHL player Brooks Laich, then of the Washington Capitals, in December 2013. The couple announced their engagement on August 18, 2015, and were married on July 8, 2017. They separated in 2020, but later attempted to reconcile. Hough filed for divorce on November 2, 2020; the divorce was finalized on February 22, 2022.

Hough attracted controversy in October 2013 when she donned blackface as part of a Halloween costume depicting Uzo Aduba's character Suzanne "Crazy Eyes" Warren from the Netflix comedy-drama Orange Is the New Black. Hough later apologized, writing on Twitter, "I realize my costume hurt and offended people and I truly apologize."

She was diagnosed with endometriosis in 2008, and went public with it to help de-stigmatize the conditions surrounding the disease.

She co-owns a wine brand with actress Nina Dobrev called Fresh Vine Wine.

== Dancing with the Stars performances ==
Season	Partner	Place	Average
4	Apolo Ohno	1st	27.5
5	Hélio Castroneves	1st	27.1
6	Adam Carolla	9th	18.5
7	Cody Linley	4th	22.4
8	Chuck Wicks	6th	23.2

=== With Apolo Anton Ohno ===
Week	Dance	Song	Judges' scores			Dance	Result
Week	Dance	Song	Inaba	Goodman	Tonioli	Dance	Result
1	Cha-cha-cha	"Let's Hear It for the Boy" — Deniece Williams	7	7	7	21	No Elimination
2	Quickstep	"Two Hearts" — Phil Collins	8	9	9	26	Safe
3	Jive	"You Never Can Tell" — Chuck Berry	7	8	8	23	Safe
4	Waltz	"If You Don't Know Me by Now" — Simply Red	9	8	9	26	Safe
5	Samba	"I Like to Move It" — Reel 2 Real	10	10	10	30	Safe
6	Rumba	"Cool" — Gwen Stefani	9	9	10	28	Safe
7	Foxtrot	"Steppin' Out with My Baby" — Dinah Shore	9	8	9	26	Safe
7	Mambo	"Dr. Beat" — Miami Sound Machine	9	9	10	28	Safe
8	Tango	"Jessie's Girl" — Rick Springfield	10	8	10	28	Safe
8	Paso doble	"Carnaval de Paris" — Dario G	10	10	10	30	Safe
9 (Semi-finals)	Quickstep	"Mr. Pinstripe Suit" — Big Bad Voodoo Daddy	10	10	10	30	Bottom Two
9 (Semi-finals)	Cha-cha-cha	"Push It" — Salt-N-Pepa	10	9	10	29	Bottom Two
10 (Finals)	Rumba	"Midnight Train to Georgia" — Gladys Knight & the Pips	9	9	10	28	Winners
10 (Finals)	Freestyle	"Bust a Move" — Young MC	10	10	10	30	Winners
10 (Finals)	Paso doble	"Carnaval de Paris" — Dario G	10	10	10	30	Winners

=== With Hélio Castroneves ===
Week	Dance	Song	Judges' scores			Dance	Result
Week	Dance	Song	Inaba	Goodman	Tonioli	Dance	Result
1	Foxtrot	"Bewitched" — Steve Lawrence	8	9	8	25	Safe
2	Mambo	"Para los Rumberos" — Santana	9	9	9	27	Safe
3	Jive	"Kids in America" — Kim Wilde	8	8	8	24	Safe
4	Viennese waltz	"Iris" — Goo Goo Dolls	9	9	9	27	Safe
5	Rumba	"Apologize" — Timbaland, feat. OneRepublic	8	7	8	23	Safe
6	Cha-cha-cha	"Get Up Offa That Thing" — James Brown	9	10	9	28	Safe
7	Tango	"The Jean Genie" — David Bowie	9	8	8	25	Safe
7	Samba	"Candela" — Buena Vista Social Club	9	9	9	27	Safe
8	Paso doble	"Amparito Roca" — Unidad musical de la Guardia Real España	9	9	9	27	Safe
8	Quickstep	"Hey! Pachuco!" — Royal Crown Revue	10	10	10	30	Safe
9 (Semi-finals)	Foxtrot	"Ain't That a Kick in the Head?" — Dean Martin	10	10	10	30	Safe
9 (Semi-finals)	Cha-cha-cha	"Love Rollercoaster" — Red Hot Chili Peppers	10	10	10	30	Safe
10 (Finals)	Jive	"Let's Twist Again" — Chubby Checker	8	8	9	25	Safe
10 (Finals)	Freestyle	"Land of 1000 Dances" — Wilson Pickett	9	10	10	29	Safe
10 (Finals)	Quickstep	"Hey! Pachuco!" — Royal Crown Revue	10	10	10	30	Winners

=== With Adam Carolla ===
Week	Dance	Song	Judges' scores			Dance	Result
Week	Dance	Song	Inaba	Goodman	Tonioli	Dance	Result
1	Foxtrot	"Mellow Yellow" — Donovan	5	5	5	15	No Elimination
2	Mambo	"House of Bamboo" — Andy Williams	6	7	6	19	Safe
3	Tango	"I Can't Tell A Waltz From A Tango" — Alma Cogan	7	7	7	21	Safe
4	Paso doble	"The Plaza of Execution" — James Horner	6	7	6	19	Eliminated

=== With Cody Linley ===
Week	Dance	Song	Judges' scores			Dance	Result
Week	Dance	Song	Inaba	Goodman	Tonioli	Dance	Result
1	Cha-cha-cha	"Tilt Ya Head Back" — Nelly & Christina Aguilera	6	6	6	18	No Elimination
1	Quickstep	"I Want You To Want Me" — Letters to Cleo	8	7	8	23	Safe
2	Rumba	"Bleeding Love" — Leona Lewis	7	7	7	21	Safe
3	Jive	"Call Me the Breeze" — Lynyrd Skynyrd	7	7	7	21	No Elimination
4	Tango	"Bohemian Like You" — The Dandy Warhols	7	8	8	23	Safe
5	Jitterbug	"Big Time Operator" — Big Bad Voodoo Daddy	10	9	9	26	Safe
6	Samba	"Whine Up" — Kat DeLuna, feat. Elephant Man	8	8 (Note: Due to Len Goodman's absence, Michael Flatley filled in Goodman's spot to score contestants.)	7	23	Safe
7 (Note: Due to Julianne recovering from endometriosis surgery, Cody performed with Edyta Śliwińska.)	Viennese waltz	"Have You Ever Really Loved a Woman?" — Bryan Adams	8	7	7	22	Safe
7	Team Cha-cha-cha	"Mercy" — Duffy	6	7	7	20	Safe
8 (Note: Due to Julianne recovering from endometriosis surgery, Cody performed with Edyta Śliwińska.)	Foxtrot	"Call Me Irresponsible" — Frank Sinatra	8	8	8	24	Safe
8	Mambo	"My Way" — Los Lonely Boys	8	8	8	24	Safe
9	Paso doble	"Le Disko" — Shiny Toy Guns	8	7	7	22	Eliminated
9	Salsa	"Juventud de Presente" — Tito Puente	8	8	8	24	Eliminated

=== With Chuck Wicks ===
Week	Dance	Song	Judges' scores			Dance	Result
Week	Dance	Song	Inaba	Goodman	Tonioli	Dance	Result
1	Waltz	"Are You Lonesome Tonight?" — Elvis Presley	6	7	7	20	No Elimination
2	Salsa	"Say Hey (I Love You)" — Michael Franti & Spearhead	6	7	7	20	Safe
3	Foxtrot	"All I Want To Do" — Sugarland	8	7	8	23	Safe
4	Lindy Hop	"Summertime Blues" — Brian Setzer	8	7	7	22	Safe
5	Viennese waltz	"Feels Like Today" — Rascal Flatts	7	8	8	23	Safe
6	Rumba	"She Will Be Loved" — Maroon 5	8	7	8	23	Safe
7	Samba	"Bailá, Bailá" — Angela Via, feat. Joe Budden	9	9	9	27	Safe
8	Cha-cha-cha	"I'm Outta Love" — Anastacia	9	9	8	26	Eliminated
8	Team Mambo	"Single Ladies (Put a Ring on It)" — Beyoncé	8	8	9	25	Eliminated

== Discography ==
=== Albums / EPs ===
Title	Album details	Peak chart positions		
Title	Album details	US Country	US	US Holiday
Julianne Hough	Release date: May 20, 2008; Label: Mercury Nashville	1	3	—
Sounds of the Season: The Julianne Hough Holiday Collection (EP)	Release date: October 12, 2008; Label: Mercury Nashville	2	24	2

=== Singles ===
Year	Single	Peak chart positions			Album
Year	Single	US Country	US	US Pop	Album
2007	"Will You Dance With Me"	—	114	100	Non-album single
2008	"That Song in My Head"	18	88	84	Julianne Hough
2008	"My Hallelujah Song"	44	—	—	Julianne Hough
2010	"Is That So Wrong"	—	—	—	Wildfire (unreleased)
2019	"Transform"	—	—	—	Non-album single
"—" denotes releases did not chart

=== Guest singles ===
Year	Single	Artist	Peak chart positions							Album
Year	Single	Artist	US	CAN	NOR	IRE	NZ	SWE	SPA	Album
2010	"We Are the World 25 for Haiti"	Artists for Haiti	2	7	1	9	8	5	15	Non-album single

=== Soundtrack appearances ===
Title	Album details	Peak chart positions
Title	Album details	US
Rock of Ages	Release date: June 5, 2012; Label: WaterTower Music	5
Grease Live! (Music from the Television Event)	Release date: January 31, 2016; Label: Paramount Pictures	37

=== Music videos ===
Year	Song	Director
2008	"That Song in My Head"	Trey Fanjoy
2008	"My Hallelujah Song"	Wayne Isham
2010	"We Are the World 25 for Haiti"	Paul Haggis
2010	"Is That So Wrong"	Adam Shankman

== Filmography ==
=== Film ===
Year	Title	Role	Notes
2001	Harry Potter and the Philosopher's Stone	Hogwarts schoolgirl	Uncredited extra
2010	Burlesque	Georgia	
2011	Footloose	Ariel Moore	
2012	Rock of Ages	Sherrie Christian	
2013	Safe Haven	Katie Feldman / Erin Tierney	
2013	Paradise	Lamb Mannerhelm	
2015	Curve	Mallory Rutledge	
2016	Dirty Grandpa	Meredith Goldstein	
2018	The Steam Engines of Oz	Locasta	Voice role
2018	Bigger	Betty Weider	
2026	The Bride!	Iris / Jinx	

=== Television ===
Year	Title	Role	Notes
2006	Show Me the Money	Herself/Dancer	7 episodes (2 unaired)
2007–2009	Dancing with the Stars	Dancer/Choreographer	Season 4–8
2013, 2014, 2017, 2021	Dancing with the Stars	Guest Judge	Season 17–18, 25, 30
2014–2017	Dancing with the Stars	Judge	season 19–24
2023–present	Dancing with the Stars	Co-Host	Season 32–present
2011	Keeping Up with the Kardashians	Herself	Episode: "Kim's Fairytale Wedding: A Kardashian Event – Part 2"
2011	Strictly Come Dancing	Herself/Dancer	Episode: "Week 3: The Results"
2012	Punk'd	Herself	Episode: "Kellan Lutz"
2014	Nashville	Herself	Episode: "I'm Coming Home to You"
2015	Lip Sync Battle	Herself	Episode: "Julianne Hough vs Derek Hough"
2016	Running Wild with Bear Grylls	Herself	Season 3, episode 2
2016	Grease Live!	Sandy	Special
2016	Speechless	Miss Bloom	Episode: "C-h-o-Choir"
2016–2017	Miss USA	Herself / Host	Special
2016–2017, 2020–2022	Disney Parks Magical Christmas Celebration	Herself / Lead co-Host	Special
2019	Billboard Music Awards	Herself / Presenter	Special
2019	Heartstrings	Jolene	Episode: "Jolene"
2019	America's Got Talent	Herself / Judge	Season 14
2020	The Disney Family Singalong	Herself	Special
2022	Step into the Movies with Derek and Julianne Hough	Herself	Special
2022	75th Tony Awards: Act One	Herself (host)	Paramount+ special
2023	76th Tony Awards: Act One	Herself (host)	Pluto TV special
2024	77th Tony Awards: Act One	Herself (host)	Pluto TV special

=== Theater ===
Year	Title	Role	Venue	Ref.
2022	POTUS: Or, Behind Every Great Dumbass Are Seven Women Trying to Keep Him Alive	Dusty	Shubert Theatre, Broadway	
2027	Damn Yankees	Lola	Marquis Theater, Broadway	

=== Podcasts ===
Year	Title	Notes
2015	Lewis Howes: The School of Greatness	Episode: "Julianne Hough on Finding Your Passion and Following Your Purpose"; The podcast ended with a video of Lewis Howes testing his salsa dancing skills with Hough

== Awards and nominations ==
Year	Association	Category	Nominated work	Result	Ref.
2008	Primetime Emmy Awards	Outstanding Choreography	Dancing with the Stars	Nominated	
2009	Primetime Emmy Awards	Outstanding Choreography	Dancing with the Stars shared with Derek Hough	Nominated	
2011	ShoWest	Female Rising Star of 2011	—N/a	Won	
2012	Teen Choice Awards	Choice Movie: Breakout	Rock of Ages	Nominated	
2015	Primetime Emmy Awards	Outstanding Choreography (tie)	Dancing with the Stars shared with Derek Hough & Tessandra Chavez	Won	
