= Kerry Heysen =

Australian Film Producer

Kerry Margaret Heysen (born May 30, 1945) is an Australian film producer from Adelaide, South Australia, known for her work on Shine (1996), Snow Falling on Cedars (1999), No Reservations (2007), Glass: A Portrait of Philip in Twelve Parts (2007) and The Lucky One (2012).

== Early life ==
Heysen was born Kerry Margaret Madigan in Adelaide, South Australia and was educated at Cabra College and Flinders University. Her father, Ted Madigan was a well-known South Australian radio broadcaster.

Widowed at the age of 22, with a newborn son, she returned to school and entered Flinders University where she met fellow filmmaker, Scott Hicks.

In 1971 Heysen and Hicks married and began a lifelong pursuit of making films together. Heysen and Hicks would go on to have a second son, Jethro Heysen-Hicks.

== Career ==
Heysen's company developed the film Shine which was nominated for seven Academy Awards, five Golden Globes, nine BAFTAS, and won nine Australian Film Institute Awards. Based on the life of pianist David Helgott, the film also won Geoffrey Rush the Oscar for best actor.

Kerry Heysen is CEO and a Founding Director of the Kino Films Group of Companies, Color and Movement Films USA.

== Awards ==
In 2006, Flinders University awarded her a Distinguished Alumni Award.

In 2009, Heysen produced Glass: A Portrait of Philip in Twelve Parts, which won the 2009 Australian Film Institute Awards for Best Feature Length Documentary.

In 2014, Heysen was named as one of the most Influential Women of South Australia.

At the 2019 Queen's Birthday Honours, Heysen was made a Member of the Order of Australia for significant service to film, and to women.

In 2020, Heysen was awarded The Premier's Lifetime Achievement Award jointly with her husband Scott Hicks.

In 2022, an Honorary Doctorate of Letters was awarded to her by Flinders University of South Australia.

== Filmography ==
=== Executive producer ===
- Glass: A Portrait of Philip in Twelve Parts (2007)

=== Producer ===
- Highly Strung (2015)
- No Reservations (2007)
- Hearts in Atlantis (2001)

=== Co-Producer ===
- Fallen (2016)
- The Lucky One (2012 )

=== Associate Producer ===
- Snow Falling on Cedars (1999

=== Creative Consultant ===
- Shine (1996)
