= 1971 Qantas bomb hoax =

1971 aviation incident in Australia

1971 Qantas bomb hoax Qantas Flight 755
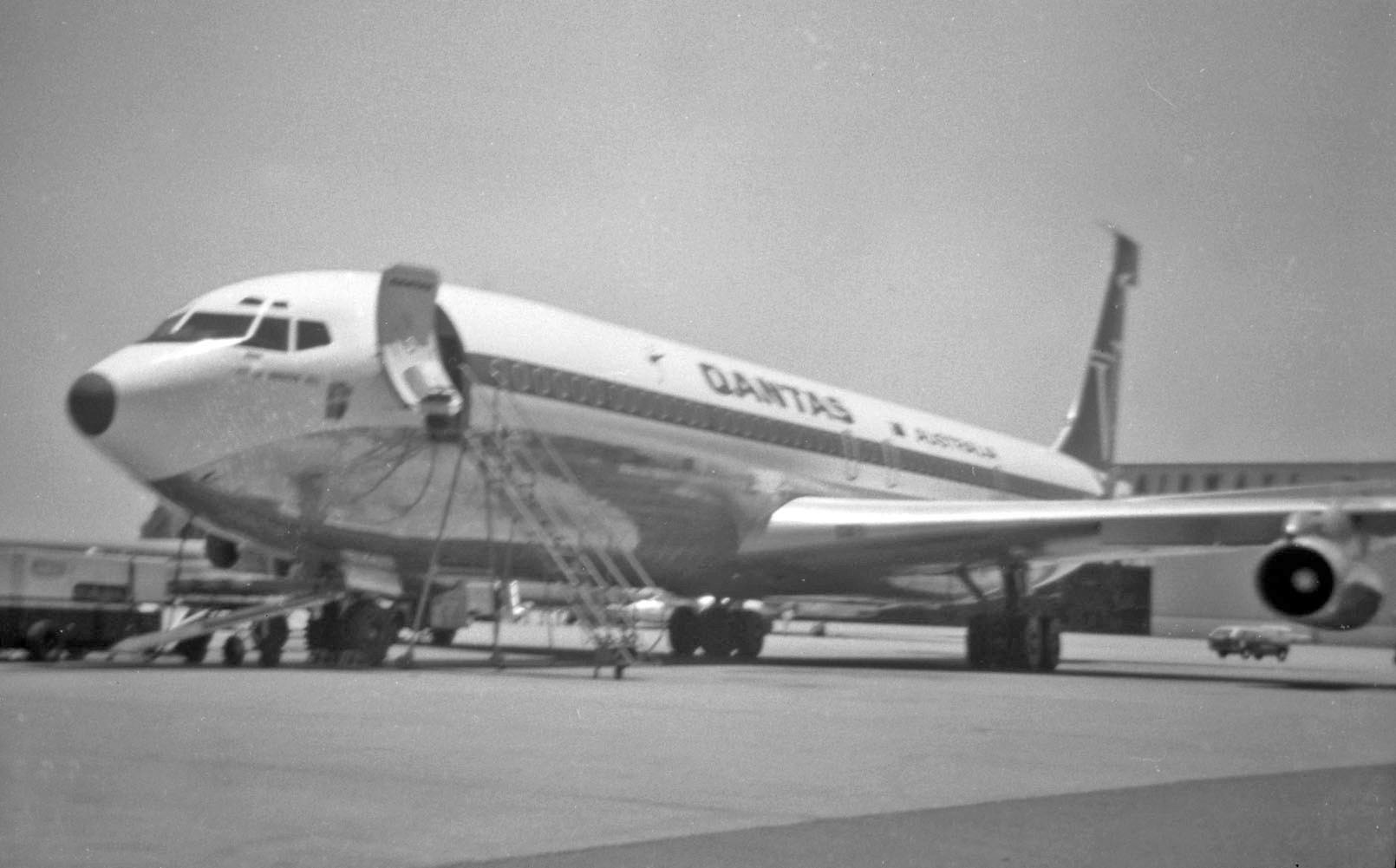
- VH-EBU, the aircraft involved in the incident, seen in 1969

Incident
- Date: 21 June 1971
- Summary: Bomb threat
- Site: Sydney, Australia

Aircraft
- Aircraft type: Boeing 707-338C
- Aircraft name: City of Broken Hill
- Operator: Qantas
- Registration: VH-EBU
- Flight origin: Sydney
- Destination: Hong Kong
- Occupants: 128
- Passengers: 116
- Crew: 12
- Fatalities: 0
- Survivors: 128

The 1971 Qantas bomb hoax was an extortion and robbery committed by Peter Macari and Raymond Poynting on 26 May 1971, where Macari, under the alias of "Mr. Brown", extorted $500,000 from Qantas by informing officials that he had hidden a bomb on board Qantas Flight 755 from Sydney to Hong Kong, and that the device would explode if the plane were to descend below 20,000 feet. In exchange for the safety of the 128 passengers and crew on board Flight 755, Macari demanded a ransom of $500,000. While authorities negotiated with Macari, Flight 755 was forced to circle Sydney; however after over six hours in the air and with fuel supplies dwindling, Qantas was forced to concede. At around 5:45 p.m., in Chifley Square, just outside Qantas company headquarters, Captain R. J. Ritchie, a Qantas general manager, handed Macari the ransom money through the window of a Volkswagen Kombi. Sometime after 6:00 pm, Qantas received a final call from Macari stating that there was no bomb onboard Flight 755. The plane was able to land safely at Sydney Airport around 6:45 p.m.

An investigation was launched by police and Macari and his accomplice, Raymond Poynting, were arrested on 4 August 1971, after a service station attendant tipped off police about Poynting's new lavish lifestyle. Poynting was jailed for seven years and Macari for 15. However, Macari served only nine years before being paroled and deported to England in 1980.

The 1986 Australian television film Call Me Mr Brown is based on the events of the 1971 Qantas bomb hoax.

== Background ==
Peter Macari was born in Devon, England. In July 1969, he was arrested on charges of indecent assault and was later released on bail. Macari then sold his elder brother Bernard a fish and chip shop he owned for roughly $6,500. In August 1969, using a false passport, Macari skipped bail and sailed to Sydney, Australia, on the MS Achille Lauro with 22-year-old Ivan Jay. Macari used a variety of aliases while living in Sydney including "Peter King", "Peter Young", "Brian Adams", and "William Day"; however, most people knew him as "Peter King", including his accomplice, Raymond Poynting. It is unclear exactly how Macari and Poynting met, but according to police they became friends while Macari was running a fibreglass furniture and boatbuilding business in Brookvale.

== Planning ==
Macari's plan to extort an aircraft was initially inspired by the 1966 television-thriller film The Doomsday Flight; the film depicted a bomb equipped with an altitude-sensitive switch being hidden inside an airliner. Macari viewed the film in Townsville in March 1971 while travelling inside what witnesses described as a "fitted-up van". According to witnesses, after watching the film Macari stated "That would be a good way to make money".

With the plan beginning to form, Macari travelled to Mount Isa in April where he befriended a miner called Francis Sorohan, who stole gelignite and a dozen detonators for him. On 11 May, Macari bought an altimeter and offered Poynting $50,000 in exchange for his help with the extortion. Poynting agreed and typed out three threatening letters that detailed the instructions for the ransom and warned that the bomb would explode if the plane descended below 20,000 feet; the three letters were later discovered in a locker at Sydney Airport, along with an explosive device consisting of unprimed gelignite that could be detonated at a set height using the altimeter. According to Poynting, Macari initially asked him for help on how to build the explosive device; however, Poynting stated that he did not know anything about electronics and that Macari apparently got the advice elsewhere. The night before the hoax on 25 May, Poynting drove Macari to the Hertz depot in Alexandria, where they stole car keys belonging to a Volkswagen Kombi, later used as the getaway vehicle during the extortion. Macari had initially planned to extort a Pan American jet, but he found that Flight 755 from Sydney to Hong Kong was the only flight that would stay long enough in the air to make the plan work.

== Extortion of Qantas Airways ==
Around midday on 26 May 1971 Macari, under the alias of "Mr Brown", called the Australian Department of Civil Aviation where he told officials he had hidden a bomb on board a Boeing 707, on Qantas Flight 755; to prove he was not lying, Macari told authorities there was an identical bomb located in locker 84 at Kingsford Smith International Airport. Police located the locker and upon opening it, found three letters and an explosive device constructed out of unprimed gelignite and an altimeter. The first letter was addressed to Captain R. J. Ritchie, Qantas' General Manager (in this period the title of "General Manager" was assigned to the Chief Executive); the letter demanded a $500,000 ransom in exchange for instructions on how to dismantle the bomb on Flight 755. The second letter repeated that an identical explosive device was hidden inside Flight 755, and the third letter warned that the bomb would explode if the plane should descend below 20,000 feet. Police defused the replica bomb found in locker 84 and replaced the explosives with a light bulb. The bomb was then taken aboard a second Boeing 707 to test whether the device would explode during its descent. The plane climbed to roughly 8,500 feet (2,600 metres) before it began its descent; when the plane reached 5,000 feet (1,500 metres) the light bulb was activated, meaning that the bomb would have exploded if the explosives had not been replaced. This worried authorities and a radio link was soon established with the pilot of Flight 755.

=== Search of Flight 755 ===
Qantas Flight 755 from Sydney to Hong Kong was a Boeing 707 and was carrying a total of 128 people; 116 passengers and 12 crew. Around 1:30 p.m., while flying over Dalby, Queensland, Captain William Selwyn, pilot of Flight 755, was informed of the situation and was told to maintain an altitude of 35,000 feet. Initial plans were made to divert the plane to Canberra as it was the highest location in the country where the plane could land. Instead, Flight 755 was diverted to Brisbane, the crew told passengers this was because of a technical fault. After reaching Brisbane air space at 2:22pm, the plane started to circle the city at an altitude of six miles (31,680 feet (9,660 m), escorted by an RAAF Phantom fighter-bomber jet. Soon afterwards, Flight 755 was diverted back to Sydney, due to superior emergency services. While Selwyn made his way back to Sydney at minimum speed, the air and cabin crew searched the plane extensively for the bomb; according to statements taken from those on board, passengers' personal belongings were searched and they were told the crew was "looking for a small-object". Selwyn later recounted:

We were searching all the time. We pulled off every conceivable panel and searched. The passengers remained calm and there was no panic at any time. This was the case even when the stewards and hostesses began ripping-up carpets and removing light-fittings.

Selwyn arrived at Sydney and was forced to circle the plane for several hours at sea off Mascot while negotiations were held. He informed controllers of his dwindling fuel supply and told them he would need to land the plane at 7:00 p.m. at the latest.

=== The pay-off ===
While Flight 755 circled at sea, Macari, still posing as "Mr Brown", spoke with Qantas deputy general manager Phillip Howson, because Qantas general manager Captain Ritchie, to whom the letter in locker 84 was addressed, was not present at the time. Macari spoke with Howson at roughly 2:00 pm, 3:00 pm, and 4:00 pm, each time providing more information and instructions regarding the ransom; at around 5:30 pm Macari spoke with Howson again, relaying his instructions for the delivery of the ransom money. Macari demanded $500,000 in used, unmarked $20 notes. With a little over an hour of fuel left on Flight 755, Qantas agreed to pay the ransom. Macari told authorities that a yellow van would park outside Qantas company headquarters in Chifley Square at 5:45 pm, and that the driver would identify himself by shaking his keys out of the window; he warned that the van must not be followed, and if there was any deviation from the agreement, he would activate the bomb on Flight 755. The money was delivered in two blue suitcases. At roughly 5:45 pm Macari arrived in a yellow Volkswagen Kombi which he had stolen the night before; he was reported to have worn a disguise consisting of a wig, a fake moustache, and glasses. Captain Ritchie handed the suitcases to Macari through the window of the van. There were four police vehicles in the area, but they were apparently never informed the handover was taking place; it remains unclear exactly what happened.

Soon after 6:00 pm, authorities received a final call from Macari stating that there was no bomb onboard Flight 755. The plane began its descent around 6:40 pm and was able to land safely at Sydney Airport.

== Investigation ==
The next day, on 27 May, a reward of $50,000 for information leading to the capture of the hoaxer was offered to the public; police received over 14,500 calls regarding the reward. The police brought in phonetic experts who, after listening to recordings of Macari's voice, concluded that he was an Englishman, likely from the Midlands, and likely a recent English migrant; police tried to match the information gained in the phonetic analysis with those that had a criminal record in Britain and they worked closely with Scotland Yard, Interpol, and the FBI, who helped Australian police narrow down the list of suspects. Two weeks after the hoax, police discovered that the gelignite and detonators used in the making of the bomb found in locker 84 at Sydney Airport were also being used in the Mount Isa Mines, in Queensland. At the time this led them to believe that the hoaxer, "Mr. Brown", either worked or had worked in the mines.

=== Arrests ===
A breakthrough came in August 1971 when police received a tip-off from a service station attendant about a young barman, Raymond Poynting; the attendant became suspicious of the man after he suddenly began making large and extravagant purchases, including buying himself an E-Type Jaguar and a Ford Falcon GT. Detectives placed Poynting and later Macari, a suspicious associate of the man, under surveillance. Police tailed a Chevrolet Camaro belonging to Macari before arresting him on Burton and Elizabeth Street, in Darlinghurst. A few hours later police arrested Poynting outside his apartment in Bondi Junction; shortly after he was detained, Poynting confessed to his part in the robbery.

=== Search for the missing money ===
Soon after the arrests, police became suspicious of an Annandale property which they believed to be owned by Macari. A bricklayer working on the property later contacted police, telling them that recent work had been done inside the house by somebody else. Police arrived at the property where they found $138,240 in $20 notes behind a bricked-up fireplace. In 1972, Qantas held an auction where they sold the suitcases used in the ransom as well as cars bought by Macari and Poynting. In July 1973, police found $137,000 of the ransom money in a home in Balmain after a new tenant contacted police, telling them that he was suspicious about the position of some of the floorboards. Police stated that Macari had hidden in the house for a few days after the extortion. After his arrest, Macari was asked by authorities where the remainder of the money was, he stated that there was another man involved in the extortion by the name of "Ken". According to Macari "Ken" was a part of a large gang and was the mastermind behind the hoax; "Ken" had seen The Doomsday Flight, and he had stayed in touch with Macari throughout the extortion. Macari stated that after he was handed the ransom money, he was given $125,000, while "Ken" took the rest. Police dismissed Macari's statement, as there was no evidence of another individual involved in the crime. As of 2021, only about $260,000 of the $500,000 ransom had been recovered. Some suspect that the missing money might be hidden underwater off Bondi Beach.

== Aftermath ==
=== Legal proceedings ===
Macari and Poynting both pleaded guilty to charges of demanding money with menaces and stealing a motor vehicle. Macari was also charged with carrying a grenade in Sydney Airport. Francis Sorohan, the man who stole the gelignite and detonators for Macari, was initially charged as a minor accomplice; however, the charges against him were later dismissed. Macari and Poynting were sentenced in January 1972 at Sydney Quarter Sessions. Macari was sentenced to fifteen years in prison, eligible for parole after serving nine; Poynting received seven years for his involvement.

In 1980, after serving nine years in prison, Macari was paroled and deported to England on a Qantas flight. Macari was later reported to be running a fish and chip shop in England bought by his brothers. In 2017, British police learned that Macari had died four years earlier, having allegedly committed suicide.

=== The Doomsday Flight ===
Four days after the hoax, an interview was published with Rod Serling, screenwriter of the 1966 film The Doomsday Flight. By now The Doomsday Flight had inspired three extortion plots. Serling expressed regret over writing the film, stating that he "didn't realise there were that many kooks in the woodwork". Later, in August of the same year, a similar incident was carried out in Denver, Colorado, on a British Overseas Airways Corporation flight with 380 passengers on board. The United States government became involved and urged 500 television stations to ban the film.

=== Copycat attempt ===
At 1:44 pm on 4 July 1997, a man contacted Qantas under the pseudonym "Mr. Brown"; he stated that he had hidden a bomb on board a Boeing 747-400, on Qantas Flight 27 from Sydney to Hong Kong, and like Macari, he said the device would explode if the plane descended below 6,500 metres (21,300 ft). He demanded $505,000 and said that the bomb contained trip wires to prevent it being defused; he also said that he was able to remotely detonate it if Qantas did not meet his demands. Like Macari, the man also demanded the money in used banknotes and that they should be delivered inside a suitcase. New South Wales Police were notified and upon further review of technical information given by the man, they deemed the threat a hoax. Authorities reached this conclusion as not only was deactivating the bomb via remote control deemed impossible, but the hoaxer also relayed inconsistent instructions to Qantas and displayed technical ineptitude. It was highly unlikely the hoaxer would have been able to hide the device on the plane. After the threat was deemed a hoax, Qantas was able to trace the origin of the call and delivered two bags full of phone books to the hoaxer to give the impression that there was money inside. At 8:15 pm, Flight 27 landed safely in Hong Kong. The calls were being made from a motel, where the hoaxer stayed the night. The next day he arranged a taxi to deliver the bags to his residence, and police followed the taxi and arrested the hoaxer once he took possession of the bags.

== In popular culture ==
In 1971, Australian singer Peter Hiscock released a single titled "A Certain Mr Brown", detailing the events of the hoax.

The 1986 Australian television film Call Me Mr Brown, written and directed by South Australian director Scott Hicks, is based on the events of the bomb hoax. Qantas actively tried to stop the film being made and despite failing to do so, Network 10, which had invested A$250,000 in the film, refrained from airing it. The film was eventually released on video in 1990.

== See also ==
- Bomb threat
- List of aircraft hijackings
