= 2012 Teen Choice Awards =

American awards ceremony held in California

- Date: July 22, 2012
- Location: Gibson Amphitheatre, Universal City, California
- Hosted by: Demi Lovato; Kevin McHale

Television/radio coverage
- Network: Fox

The 2012 Teen Choice Awards ceremony, hosted by Demi Lovato and Kevin McHale, was held on July 22, 2012, at the Gibson Amphitheatre, Universal City, California. The awards celebrated the year's achievements in music, film, television, sports, fashion, comedy, and the Internet, and were voted on by teenage viewers aged 13 through 19. Over 134 million votes were cast.

Taylor Swift had the most individual wins with five, including Choice Female Artist and Female Country Artist. Kristen Stewart obtained three awards, including the "Ultimate Choice" award which she shared with Twilight co-stars Taylor Lautner and Robert Pattinson. Although the actors received most awards, The Twilight Saga: Breaking Dawn – Part 1 won four out of 11 nominations as a whole, including the "Ultimate Choice", bringing the entire series' Teen Choice Award totals to 41. The Hunger Games won seven of its eight nominations, including Choice Book, Sci-Fi/Fantasy Movie, and Sci-Fi/Fantasy Movie Actor, for Josh Hutcherson's work. The Vampire Diaries won six of its eight nominations, including Choice Fantasy/Sci-Fi TV Show, Actor: Fantasy/Sci-Fi TV Show and Male Hottie for its star, Ian Somerhalder. Pretty Little Liars won all five of their nominations, including Choice TV Drama.

== Presenters ==
- Zooey Deschanel and Selena Gomez—presented Choice Comedian
- Shaun White and Dax Shepard—presented Choice TV Show: Sci-Fi/Fantasy
- Hayden Panettiere and Will.i.am—introduced No Doubt
- Troian Bellisario, Ashley Benson, Lucy Hale, Ian Harding and Shay Mitchell–presented Choice Movie Actor: Drama
- Zachary Knighton, Adam Pally and Damon Wayans Jr.—presented Choice Hotties
- Kevin Hart and Nina Dobrev—presented Choice Music Group
- Jordin Sparks, Adam Rodriguez and Paul Wesley—presented Choice Movie: Comedy
- Laura Marano, Vanessa Marano and Stefano—introduced Flo Rida
- Zachary Levi—presented Ultimate Choice
- Victoria Justice and Chris Colfer—presented Acuvue Inspire Award
- Tyler Posey and Lea Michele—presented Choice Female Artist
- Bridgit Mendler and Shane West—introduced Justin Bieber
- Taylor Swift—presented Choice Movie Actor: Sci-Fi/Fantasy
- Justin Kirk and Gordon Ramsay—presented Choice Summer Music Star: Group
- Zoe Saldaña and Taylor Lautner—presented Choice Summer Movie Star: Male
- Cat Deeley, Demi Lovato, and Kevin McHale—introduced Carly Rae Jepsen

== Performers ==
- Pauly D (DJ host)
- No Doubt – "Settle Down"
- Flo Rida – "Whistle" and "Wild Ones" with Stayc Reigns
- Justin Bieber – "Boyfriend" and "As Long as You Love Me" with Big Sean
- Carly Rae Jepsen – "Call Me Maybe"

== Winners and nominees ==
Winners are listed first and highlighted in bold text.

=== Movies ===
Choice Movie: Action	Choice Movie Actor: Action
**Abduction**; Act of Valor; Mission: Impossible – Ghost Protocol; Red Tails; Sherlock Holmes: A Game of Shadows	**Taylor Lautner – Abduction**; Tom Cruise – Mission: Impossible – Ghost Protocol; Robert Downey Jr. – Sherlock Holmes: A Game of Shadows; Tom Hardy – Warrior; Logan Lerman – The Three Musketeers
Choice Movie Actress: Action	Choice Movie: Sci-Fi/Fantasy
**Zoe Saldaña – Colombiana**; Salma Hayek – Puss in Boots; Milla Jovovich – The Three Musketeers; Paula Patton – Mission: Impossible – Ghost Protocol; Noomi Rapace – Sherlock Holmes: A Game of Shadows	**The Hunger Games**; The Avengers; Mirror Mirror; The Twilight Saga: Breaking Dawn – Part 1; Wrath of the Titans
Choice Movie Actor: Sci-Fi/Fantasy	Choice Movie Actress: Sci-Fi/Fantasy
**Josh Hutcherson – Journey 2: The Mysterious Island & The Hunger Games**; Robert Downey Jr. – The Avengers; Chris Hemsworth – The Avengers; Taylor Lautner – The Twilight Saga: Breaking Dawn – Part 1; Robert Pattinson – The Twilight Saga: Breaking Dawn – Part 1	**Jennifer Lawrence – The Hunger Games**; Lily Collins – Mirror Mirror; Vanessa Hudgens – Journey 2: The Mysterious Island; Scarlett Johansson – The Avengers; Kristen Stewart – The Twilight Saga: Breaking Dawn – Part 1
Choice Movie: Drama	Choice Movie Actor: Drama
**The Lucky One**; Drive; The Help; The Vow; We Bought a Zoo	**Zac Efron – The Lucky One**; Matt Damon – We Bought a Zoo; Ryan Gosling – Drive; Channing Tatum – The Vow; Justin Timberlake – In Time
Choice Movie Actress: Drama	Choice Movie: Comedy
**Emma Stone – The Help**; Sandra Bullock – Extremely Loud and Incredibly Close; Viola Davis – The Help; Scarlett Johansson – We Bought a Zoo; Rachel McAdams – The Vow	**21 Jump Street**; American Reunion; Crazy, Stupid, Love; The Muppets; What to Expect When You're Expecting
Choice Movie Actor: Comedy	Choice Movie Actress: Comedy
**Channing Tatum – 21 Jump Street**; Jason Biggs – American Reunion; Ryan Gosling – Crazy, Stupid, Love; Jonah Hill – 21 Jump Street; Chris Rock – What to Expect When You're Expecting	**Emma Stone – Crazy, Stupid, Love**; Cameron Diaz – What to Expect When You're Expecting; Alyson Hannigan – American Reunion; Jennifer Lopez – What to Expect When You're Expecting; Reese Witherspoon – This Means War
Choice Movie: Romance	Choice Movie Actor: Romance
**The Twilight Saga: Breaking Dawn – Part 1**; The Lucky One; Think Like a Man; This Means War; The Vow	**Zac Efron – The Lucky One**; Michael Ealy – Think Like a Man; Robert Pattinson – The Twilight Saga: Breaking Dawn – Part 1; Chris Pine – This Means War; Channing Tatum – The Vow
Choice Movie Actress: Romance	Choice Movie: Voice
**Kristen Stewart – The Twilight Saga: Breaking Dawn – Part 1**; Miley Cyrus – LOL; Meagan Good – Think Like a Man; Rachel McAdams – The Vow; Taylor Schilling – The Lucky One	**Taylor Swift – The Lorax**; Zac Efron – The Lorax; Seth MacFarlane – Ted; Jesse McCartney – Alvin and the Chipmunks: Chipwrecked; Chris Rock – Madagascar 3: Europe's Most Wanted
Choice Movie: Villain	Choice Movie: Scene Stealer – Male
**Alexander Ludwig – The Hunger Games**; Jemaine Clement – Men in Black 3; Tom Hiddleston – The Avengers; Rhys Ifans – The Amazing Spider-Man; Charlize Theron – Snow White and the Huntsman	**Liam Hemsworth – The Hunger Games**; Chace Crawford – What to Expect When You're Expecting; Chris Evans – The Avengers; Kevin Hart – Think Like a Man; Kellan Lutz – The Twilight Saga: Breaking Dawn – Part 1
Choice Movie: Scene Stealer – Female	Choice Movie: Breakout
**Ashley Greene – The Twilight Saga: Breaking Dawn – Part 1**; Elizabeth Banks – The Hunger Games; Lea Michele – New Year's Eve; Nikki Reed – The Twilight Saga: Breaking Dawn – Part 1; Nicole Scherzinger – Men in Black 3	**Rihanna – Battleship**; Sam Claflin – Snow White and the Huntsman; Julianne Hough – Rock of Ages; Joe Manganiello – What to Expect When You're Expecting; Noomi Rapace – Prometheus
Choice Movie: Chemistry	Choice Movie: Liplock
**Jennifer Lawrence & Amandla Stenberg – The Hunger Games**; Steve Carell & Ryan Gosling – Crazy, Stupid, Love; Jonah Hill & Channing Tatum – 21 Jump Street; Will Smith & Josh Brolin – Men in Black 3; Mark Wahlberg & Seth MacFarlane – Ted	**Jennifer Lawrence & Josh Hutcherson – The Hunger Games**; Zac Efron & Taylor Schilling – The Lucky One; Ryan Gosling & Emma Stone – Crazy, Stupid, Love; Rachel McAdams & Channing Tatum – The Vow; Kristen Stewart & Robert Pattinson – The Twilight Saga: Breaking Dawn – Part 1
Choice Movie: Hissy Fit	Choice Summer Movie: Action
**Charlize Theron – Snow White and the Huntsman**; Steve Carell – Crazy, Stupid, Love; Kevin Hart – Think Like a Man; Jonah Hill & Channing Tatum – 21 Jump Street; Mark Ruffalo – The Avengers	**The Avengers**; The Amazing Spider-Man; Men in Black 3; Prometheus; Snow White and the Huntsman
Choice Summer Movie: Comedy/Music	Choice Summer Movie Actor
**Katy Perry: Part of Me**; Madagascar 3: Europe's Most Wanted; Rock of Ages; Ted; That's My Boy	**Chris Hemsworth – The Avengers & Snow White and the Huntsman**; Robert Downey Jr. – The Avengers; Andrew Garfield – The Amazing Spider-Man; Adam Sandler – That's My Boy; Will Smith – Men in Black 3
Choice Summer Movie Actress	
**Kristen Stewart – Snow White and the Huntsman**; Scarlett Johansson – The Avengers; Leighton Meester – That's My Boy; Emma Stone – The Amazing Spider-Man; Charlize Theron – Snow White and the Huntsman & Prometheus	

=== Television ===
Choice TV Show: Drama	Choice TV Actor: Drama
**Pretty Little Liars**; Bones; Gossip Girl; Revenge; Touch	**Ian Harding – Pretty Little Liars**; Penn Badgley – Gossip Girl; David Boreanaz – Bones; Kiefer Sutherland – Touch; Ed Westwick – Gossip Girl
Choice TV Actress: Drama	Choice TV Show: Sci-Fi/Fantasy
**Lucy Hale – Pretty Little Liars**; Emily Deschanel – Bones; Sarah Michelle Gellar – Ringer; Leighton Meester – Gossip Girl; Emily VanCamp – Revenge	**The Vampire Diaries**; Fringe; Once Upon a Time; Supernatural; True Blood
Choice TV Actor: Sci-Fi/Fantasy	Choice TV Actress: Sci-Fi/Fantasy
**Ian Somerhalder – The Vampire Diaries**; Jensen Ackles – Supernatural; Joshua Jackson – Fringe; Jared Padalecki – Supernatural; Paul Wesley – The Vampire Diaries	**Nina Dobrev – The Vampire Diaries**; Ginnifer Goodwin – Once Upon a Time; Kat Graham – The Vampire Diaries; Anna Paquin – True Blood; Anna Torv – Fringe
Choice TV Show: Action	Choice TV Actor: Action
**CSI: Miami**; Chuck; Hawaii Five-0; NCIS: Los Angeles; Nikita	**Adam Rodriguez – CSI: Miami**; Daniel Dae Kim – Hawaii Five-O; Zachary Levi – Chuck; LL Cool J – NCIS: Los Angeles; Shane West – Nikita
Choice TV Actress: Action	Choice TV Show: Comedy
**Linda Hunt – NCIS: Los Angeles**; Lyndsy Fonseca – Nikita; Grace Park – Hawaii Five-O; Maggie Q – Nikita; Yvonne Strahovski – Chuck	**Glee**; 2 Broke Girls; The Big Bang Theory; Modern Family; New Girl
Choice TV Actor: Comedy	Choice TV Actress: Comedy
**Chris Colfer – Glee**; Ty Burrell – Modern Family; Neil Patrick Harris – How I Met Your Mother; Ashton Kutcher – Two and a Half Men; Jim Parsons – The Big Bang Theory	**Lea Michele – Glee**; Miranda Cosgrove – iCarly; Kaley Cuoco – The Big Bang Theory; Zooey Deschanel – New Girl; Sofía Vergara – Modern Family
Choice TV: Animated Show	Choice TV: Reality Competition
**The Simpsons**; Beavis and Butt-head; Bob's Burgers; Family Guy; Robot Chicken	**The X Factor**; America's Next Top Model; American Idol; Survivor: One World; The Voice
Choice TV: Reality Show	Choice TV Personality: Male
**Punk'd**; Dance Moms; Jersey Shore; Keeping Up with the Kardashians; Tia & Tamera	**Simon Cowell – The X Factor**; Nick Cannon – America's Got Talent; CeeLo Green – The Voice; Gordon Ramsay – Hell's Kitchen; Steven Tyler – American Idol
Choice TV Personality: Female	Choice TV: Villain
**Jennifer Lopez – American Idol**; Christina Aguilera – The Voice; Tyra Banks – America's Next Top Model; Carrie Ann Inaba – Dancing with the Stars; Jessica Simpson – Fashion Star	**Janel Parrish – Pretty Little Liars**; Joseph Morgan – The Vampire Diaries; Lana Parrilla – Once Upon a Time; Krysten Ritter – Don't Trust the B— in Apartment 23; Michelle Trachtenberg – Gossip Girl
Choice TV: Male Scene Stealer	Choice TV: Female Scene Stealer
**Michael Trevino – The Vampire Diaries**; Max Greenfield – New Girl; Gabriel Mann – Revenge; James Van Der Beek – Don't Trust the B— in Apartment 23; Damon Wayans Jr. – Happy Endings	**Candice Accola – The Vampire Diaries**; Dianna Agron – Glee; Sarah Hyland – Modern Family; Francia Raisa – The Secret Life of the American Teenager; Casey Wilson – Happy Endings
Choice TV: Breakout Show	Choice TV Breakout Performance – Male
**The X Factor**; Don't Trust the B— in Apartment 23; New Girl; Revenge; Smash	**Beau Mirchoff – Awkward.**; Josh Bowman – Revenge; Josh Dallas – Once Upon a Time; Jake Johnson – New Girl; Lamorne Morris – New Girl
Choice TV Breakout Performance - Female	Choice TV Reality Star – Male
**Hannah Simone – New Girl**; Beth Behrs – 2 Broke Girls; Sutton Foster – Bunheads; Katharine McPhee – Smash; Dreama Walker – Don't Trust the B— in Apartment 23	**Paul "Pauly D" DelVocchio – Jersey Shore**; Rob Dyrdek – Rob Dyrdek's Fantasy Factory; William Levy – Dancing with the Stars; Scotty McCreery – American Idol; Mike "The Situation" Sorrentino – Jersey Shore
Choice TV Reality Star – Female	Choice Summer TV Show
**The Kardashians – Keeping Up with the Kardashians**; Lauren Alaina – American Idol; Melanie Amaro – The X Factor; Tia & Tamera Mowry – Tia & Tamera; Nicole "Snooki" Polizzi – Jersey Shore	**Teen Wolf**; America's Got Talent; The Secret Life of the American Teenager; So You Think You Can Dance; Workaholics
Choice Summer TV Star: Male	Choice Summer TV Star: Female
**Tyler Posey – Teen Wolf**; Ken Baumann – The Secret Life of the American Teenager; Jean-Luc Bilodeau – Baby Daddy; Michael Ealy – Common Law; Daren Kagasoff – The Secret Life of the American Teenager	**Troian Bellisario – Pretty Little Liars**; Chelsea Kane – Baby Daddy; Crystal Reed – Teen Wolf; Ashley Rickards – Awkward.; Shailene Woodley – The Secret Life of the American Teenager

=== Music ===
Choice Male Artist	Choice Female Artist
**Justin Bieber**; Drake; Bruno Mars; Pitbull; Blake Shelton	**Taylor Swift**; Adele; Jennifer Lopez; Katy Perry; Rihanna
Choice Music Group	Choice R&B/Hip-Hop Artist
**Selena Gomez & the Scene**; Gym Class Heroes; Lady Antebellum; LMFAO; The Wanted	**Nicki Minaj**; Beyoncé; Flo Rida; Pitbull; Kanye West
Choice Rock Group	Choice Country Music Artist: Male
**fun.**; The Black Keys; Foo Fighters; Foster the People; Linkin Park	**Hunter Hayes**; Jason Aldean; Luke Bryan; Scotty McCreery; Blake Shelton
Choice Country Music Artist: Female	Choice Country Group
**Taylor Swift**; Lauren Alaina; Miranda Lambert; Kellie Pickler; Carrie Underwood	**Lady Antebellum**; The Band Perry; Eli Young Band; Rascal Flatts; Thompson Square
Choice EDM Artist	Choice Single: Male
**David Guetta**; deadmau5; Calvin Harris; Kaskade; Skrillex	**"Boyfriend" – Justin Bieber**; "Give Me Everything" – Pitbull feat. Ne-Yo, Afrojack, and Nayer; "Good Feeling" – Flo Rida; "It Will Rain" – Bruno Mars; "Take Care" – Drake feat. Rihanna
Choice Single: Female	Choice Single: Group
**"Eyes Open" – Taylor Swift**; "Dance Again" – Jennifer Lopez feat. Pitbull; "Part of Me" – Katy Perry; "Set Fire to the Rain" – Adele; "Stronger (What Doesn't Kill You)" – Kelly Clarkson	**"We Are Young" – fun. feat. Janelle Monáe**; "Ass Back Home" – Gym Class Heroes feat. Neon Hitch; "Hit the Lights" – Selena Gomez & the Scene; "Moves Like Jagger" – Maroon 5 feat. Christina Aguilera; "Party Rock Anthem" – LMFAO feat. Lauren Bennett and GoonRock
Choice Country Song	Choice R&B/Hip-Hop Song
**"Sparks Fly" – Taylor Swift**; "Crazy Girl" – Eli Young Band; "God Gave Me You" – Blake Shelton; "Storm Warning" – Hunter Hayes; "Tattoos on This Town" – Jason Aldean	**"Starships" – Nicki Minaj**; "Love on Top" – Beyoncé; "Take Care" – Drake feat. Rihanna; "Wild Ones" – Flo Rida feat. Sia; "Without You" – David Guetta feat. Usher
Choice Rock Song	Choice Love Song
**"Paradise" – Coldplay**; "Lonely Boy" – The Black Keys; "Pumped Up Kicks" – Foster the People; "Somebody That I Used to Know" – Gotye feat. Kimbra; "We Are Young" – fun. feat. Janelle Monáe	**"What Makes You Beautiful" – One Direction**; "Die in Your Arms" – Justin Bieber; "Give Your Heart a Break" – Demi Lovato; "Home" – Phillip Phillips; "I Won't Give Up" – Jason Mraz
Choice Break-Up Song	Choice Music: Breakout Artist
**"Payphone" – Maroon 5 feat. Wiz Khalifa**; "Climax" – Usher; "Somebody That I Used to Know" – Gotye feat. Kimbra; "Stronger (What Doesn't Kill You)" – Kelly Clarkson; "Wide Awake" – Katy Perry	**Carly Rae Jepsen**; Gotye; Ellie Goulding; Kimbra; Phillip Phillips
Choice Music: Breakout Group	Choice Summer Song
**One Direction**; Eli Young Band; fun.; Karmin; The Wanted	**"Call Me Maybe" – Carly Rae Jepsen**; "All Around the World" – Justin Bieber feat. Ludacris; "Give Your Heart a Break" – Demi Lovato; "Glad You Came" – The Wanted; "Scream" – Usher
Choice Summer Music Star: Male	Choice Summer Music Star: Female
**Justin Bieber**; Flo Rida; David Guetta; Pitbull; Usher	**Demi Lovato**; Carly Rae Jepsen; Jennifer Lopez; Katy Perry; Rihanna
Choice Summer Music Group	
**One Direction**; Coldplay; Gym Class Heroes; Maroon 5; The Wanted	

=== Fashion ===
Choice Hottie: Male	Choice Hottie: Female
**Ian Somerhalder**; Justin Bieber; Ryan Gosling; Liam Hemsworth; Robert Pattinson	**Miley Cyrus**; Selena Gomez; Katy Perry; Rihanna; Kate Upton
Choice Fashion Icon: Male	Choice Fashion Icon: Female
**Justin Bieber**; Chris Colfer; CeeLo Green; Justin Timberlake; will.i.am	**Katy Perry**; Miley Cyrus; Zooey Deschanel; Jennifer Lopez; Nicki Minaj

=== Sports ===
Choice Athlete: Male	Choice Athlete: Female
**David Beckham**; Kobe Bryant; Albert Pujols; Tim Tebow; Shaun White	**Serena Williams**; Kelly Clark; Maria Sharapova; Hope Solo; Lindsey Vonn

=== Miscellaneous ===
Choice Book	Choice Comedian
**The Hunger Games – Suzanne Collins**; Divergent – Veronica Roth; The Giver – Lois Lowry; The Lucky One – Nicholas Sparks; The Twilight Saga – Stephenie Meyer	**Ellen DeGeneres**; Jimmy Fallon; Andy Samberg; Daniel Tosh; Kristen Wiig
Choice Social Network	Choice Twit
**Facebook**; Instagram; Pinterest; Tumblr; Twitter	**Demi Lovato**; Justin Bieber; Miley Cyrus; Jimmy Fallon; Ryan Seacrest
Choice Video Game	Choice Web Star
**Just Dance 3**; Call of Duty: Modern Warfare 3; Mass Effect 3; NBA 2K12; The Sims 3 Showtime: Katy Perry Collector's Edition	**Sophia Grace & Rosie**; Ryan Beatty; Cimorelli; Elle and Blair Fowler; Karmin

== Television ratings ==
The 2012 Teen Choice Awards received a 1.0 rating, a 3 share among viewers aged 18–49 and was watched by 3.02 million viewers.
