= The Doomsday Flight =

- Film poster
- Genre: Thriller
- Written by: Rod Serling
- Directed by: William Graham
- Starring: Jack Lord; Edmond O'Brien; Katherine Crawford; John Saxon; Van Johnson
- Music by: Lalo Schifrin
- Country of origin: United States
- Original language: English

Production
- Producer: Frank Price
- Cinematography: William Margulies
- Editor: Robert F. Shugrue
- Running time: 93 minutes
- Production company: Universal Television

Original release
- Network: NBC
- Release: 13 December 1966

The Doomsday Flight is a 1966 American thriller television film written by Rod Serling and directed by William Graham. The cast includes Jack Lord, Edmond O'Brien, Van Johnson, Katherine Crawford, John Saxon, Richard Carlson and Ed Asner. It aired on NBC on 13 December 1966.

The film concerns a bomb placed on an airliner, and the efforts to locate it before it explodes. The terrorist who placed the bomb demands money in exchange for necessary information. The film inspired real-life copycat incidents involving bomb threats.

== Plot ==
At Los Angeles International Airport, a Douglas DC-8 airliner takes off for New York. Shortly after takeoff, the airline receives a bomb threat. The stranger on the telephone asks for a sum of $100,000 in small denominations. He also states that the bomb is hidden in the cabin. The stranger is actually a former engineer who worked in the aviation industry.

The company Chief Pilot Bob Shea decides to warn the flight crew. He orders pilot Capt. Anderson, to circle around Las Vegas. He also asks the flight crew to search for the bomb on board. It is revealed that the bomb has an aneroid, altitude-sensitive switch and will detonate when the aircraft descends.

Meanwhile, the search to find the bomb on board the flight involves the opening of passenger hand luggage and tearing open several areas in the cabin and cockpit. All efforts are unsuccessful. The passengers are alerted to the emergency and start to panic.

The bomb threat caller telephones again to tell the police how to pay the ransom. A delivery man will simply come to the airport and take the money. The police follow the van closely, but the van has a serious accident on a ring road and catches fire. The terrorist has trouble believing the police who confirm that they are preparing a second payment. He seeks refuge at a bar, where he drinks a lot and starts talking to the bartender who is suspicious of the caller.

When the caller has a heart attack, the bartender calls the police who come running, but the man is dead. The FBI Special Agent Frank Thompson then interrogates the bartender asking him to report the exact words of the terrorist. The police discover that the bomb will explode if the airliner drops below 4,000 feet.

The chief pilot then decides to tell the flight crew to land the aircraft at Stapleton International Airport in Denver, Colorado, whose altitude is higher, and landing there will not trigger the bomb. After the airliner is safely on the ground, the flight crew meet in the airline operations room of his company.

In the end, by chance, the bomb is discovered where it was least expected – in the pilot's chart case.

== Cast ==
- Jack Lord as FBI Special Agent Frank Thompson
- Edmond O'Brien as The Man, Bomb Threat Caller
- Van Johnson as Captain Anderson, Pilot
- Katherine Crawford as Jean
- John Saxon as George Ducette, a celebrity on flight
- Richard Carlson as Chief Pilot Bob Shea
- Edward Faulkner as Co-Pilot Reilly
- Tom Simcox as Flight Engineer
- Michael Sarrazin as Army Corporal with PTSD
- Edward Asner as Mr. Feldman
- Malachi Throne as The Bartender
- Jan Shepard as Mrs. Elizabeth Thompson
- Greg Morris as FBI Agent Balaban
- David Lewis as Mr. Rierdon, Personnel Director, Aviation Co.
- Howard Caine as Mack, L.A. Dispatcher

== Production ==
The film was the second in a series of at least twelve movies made for television by Universal for NBC. The films were budgeted between $750,000 and $1,250,000 and would air on Tuesday and Saturday nights. Some would be pilots for series.

It was the first TV movie for John Saxon and first American television film for Michael Sarrazin, who was under contract to Universal.

== Release ==
The Doomsday Flight premiered in Canada on CTV on 10 December 1966, and on NBC in the United States on 13 December 1966. On NBC, it was the most watched made-for-TV movie to that time, with a Nielsen rating of 27.5 and an audience share of 48% until it was surpassed by Heidi in 1968.

The Doomsday Flight was released theatrically in cinemas in other countries around the world, and distributed by the Rank Organisation in the UK.

MCA Home Video released "The Doomsday Flight" on VHS in 1986.

== Reception ==
In a contemporary review by J. Gould in The New York Times decried the "exploitation of bomb scares on passenger airplanes" engendered by The Doomsday Flight. (Note: The story of The Doomsday Flight was one that Rod Serling admitted that he regretted writing.)

=== Copycats and FAA concerns ===
The Doomsday Flight led to copycats who would call airlines and claim to have a similar bomb aboard a flight. A notable attempt was the Qantas bomb hoax in 1971, when a caller claimed to have placed such a bomb. The man actually placed a bomb at the Sydney Airport, leading officials to take the threat seriously and pay out $500,000 to the person. In 1971 the Federal Aviation Administration urged television stations in the United States not to air the film, on the basis that the film could inspire other emotionally unstable individuals to commit the same or similar acts as the villain in the film.

== See also ==
- Aircraft hijacking
- Disaster film
