= Teen Choice Award for Choice Movie – Romance =

Entertainment award category

The following is a list of Teen Choice Award winners and nominees for Choice Movie - Romance. It was formally awarded under different titles and separate categories: Choice Movie - Date Movie in 2004 and 2005, Choice Movie - Chick Flick from 2006 to 2008, Choice Movie - Bromantic Comedy in 2008 and 2009 and Choice Movie - Romantic Comedy in 2008, 2010 and 2011 before being retitled to its current title from 2009 in 2012.

== Winners and nominees ==
=== 2000s ===
Year	Winner	Nominees	Ref.
2004	Choice Movie - Date Movie		
2004	50 First Dates	13 Going on 30; Along Came Polly; Chasing Liberty; Honey; Love Don't Cost a Thing; Win a Date with Tad Hamilton!; You Got Served	
2005	Choice Movie - Date Movie		
2005	The Notebook	A Cinderella Story; Fever Pitch; Guess Who; Hitch; A Lot like Love; Monster-in-Law; Mr. & Mrs. Smith	
2006	Choice Movie - Chick Flick		
2006	Just like Heaven	Aquamarine; Failure to Launch; Just My Luck; The Lake House; Last Holiday	
2007	Choice Movie - Chick Flick		
2007	The Holiday	Georgia Rule; The Last Kiss; License to Wed; Music and Lyrics	
2008	Choice Movie - Chick Flick		
2008	27 Dresses	Enchanted; Fool's Gold; P.S. I Love You; Sex and the City	
2008	Choice Movie - Bromantic Comedy		
2008	What Happens in Vegas	Dan in Real Life; Definitely, Maybe; Forgetting Sarah Marshall; Made of Honor	
2009	Choice Movie - Bromatic Comedy		
2009	Marley & Me	I Love You, Man; Pineapple Express; Role Models; Tropic Thunder	
2009	Choice Movie - Romance		
2009	Twilight	Australia; Confessions of a Shopholic; He's Just Not That Into You; The Sisterhood of the Traveling Pants 2	

=== 2010s ===
Year	Winner	Nominees	Ref.
2010	Choice Movie - Romantic Comedy		
2010	Valentine's Day	The Back-up Plan; Just Wright; Letters to Juliet; The Proposal	
2011	Choice Movie - Romantic Comedy		
2011	Easy A	Just Go with It; Life as We Know It; No Strings Attached; Something Borrowed	
2012	Choice Movie - Romance		
2012	The Twilight Saga: Breaking Dawn – Part 1	The Lucky One; Think Like a Man; This Means War; The Vow	
2013	Choice Movie - Romance		
2013	The Twilight Saga: Breaking Dawn – Part 2	Beautiful Creatures; Les Misérables; Safe Haven; Warm Bodies	
