= Scott Hicks (director) =

Australian filmmaker (born 1953)

- Hicks in 2026
- Born: Robert Scott Hicks; 4 March 1953 (age 73); Uganda
- Education: Flinders University (BA)
- Occupations: Film director, screenwriter
- Years active: 1974–present
- Known for: Shine; Snow Falling on Cedars; Hearts in Atlantis; No Reservations; The Boys Are Back; The Lucky One
- Spouse: Kerry Heysen AM
- Children: 2

Robert Scott Hicks (born 4 March 1953) is an Australian film director, producer and screenwriter. He is best known as the director of Shine, the biopic of pianist David Helfgott, for which he was nominated for two Academy Awards (Best Director and Best Original Screenplay). Other films he has directed include the film adaptations of Stephen King's Hearts in Atlantis and Nicholas Sparks' The Lucky One.

== Early life and education ==
Hicks was born on born 4 March 1953 in Uganda. His father was a civil engineer. His family lived in Kenya, outside Nairobi before moving to the UK when Scott was 10 years old, and then moving to Adelaide, South Australia, when Hicks was 14 years old. He had piano lessons until his early teens, and learnt to read music, but "wasn't really prepared to put the necessary time in".

Hicks enrolled for an arts degree at Flinders University in Adelaide when he was 16, graduating with a Bachelor of Arts (Hons) (Drama) in 1975, along with his wife Kerry Heysen AM.

== Rock music ==
In the 1970s, when still a student, Hicks attended numerous rock concerts by international acts, and used his Nikkormat camera to photograph them. The photographs, taken at gigs including the Rolling Stones at Kooyong Tennis Club (1973); David Bowie at Adelaide Oval (1978); Bob Marley at the old Apollo Stadium; Bob Dylan at West Lakes (1978), David Cassidy (1974); The Police; and Rod Stewart on his Blondes Have More Fun tour, have been preserved, and selected images have been mounted in at least two exhibitions:

- Misspent Youth, February–March 2015 at the Hill Smith Gallery, Adelaide
- Scott Hicks – Behind the Velvet Rope, May 2022 at Light ADL, Adelaide

He started his directing career on music videos, and worked with WEA Records (Australia) on several projects. One of these was Freedom (1982), a feature film filmed in and around Adelaide, which featured music by Cold Chisel's Don Walker and most of the band, and vocals by then unknown INXS lead singer Michael Hutchence. A single, "Speed Kills" / "Fascist Sounds" was released by WEA Records in 1982.

He directed three music videos for INXS, which were some of the first Australian ones to appear on MTV:

- "Don't Change" (1982)
- "Spy of Love" (1982)
- "To Look at You" (1983)

Also with WEA, Hicks made a film clip for South Australian band Vertical Hold, costly for its time, for their third single, "Shotdown (In Love)" (1983). He used 16mm film rather than video for the clip.

== Film career ==
=== Films ===
Hicks started his film career in an industry stimulated by renewed government support for the arts, after a period of inactivity. South Australia was at the forefront of this Australian film revival, with established directors such as Peter Weir and Bruce Beresford coming to Adelaide to shoot their films.

Hicks started out working as a crew member on various feature films, before making several short films and documentaries on his own. In 1975 he co-directed and produced the hour-long fiction film Down the Wind.

In 1982, Hicks made a documentary film about the 11th Adelaide Festival of the Arts under artistic director Jim Sharman, titled The Hall of Mirrors: A Festival.

In 1986, Hicks wrote and directed the telemovie Call Me Mr. Brown, which was based on the Qantas bomb hoax of 1971. In 1988 he made a children's film called Sebastian and the Sparrow. In 1989 he made a TV documentary series for the Discovery Channel, The Great Wall of Iron, which was filmed in China with the People's Liberation Army. It became the highest-rating programme on that channel in the US.

In 1993 he made another popular and acclaimed documentary series, Submarines: Sharks of Steel.

He is best known as the director of Shine (1996), the biopic of pianist David Helfgott that won an Oscar for Geoffrey Rush for Best Actor, and garnered several other nominations at the Academy Awards as well as the AFI Awards. The film was made in Adelaide, at the insistence of the then chair of the South Australian Film Corporation, former premier David Tonkin. Launched at the 2026 Adelaide Film Festival, Hicks published a book about the difficulties getting Shine made.

Hicks' first Hollywood studio film was Snow Falling on Cedars (1999), based on David Guterson's novel of the same title. This was followed in 2001 by his second Hollywood film, the adaptation of Stephen King's novel Hearts in Atlantis.

After working on Hearts in Atlantis (2001), Hicks decided to take time off and enjoy living at home. In that time, he fell into working on American television commercials, which he enjoyed, working with some of the best names in the business.

More than six years later, Hicks made his third Hollywood film as a director in No Reservations, released in mid-2007. He followed that up with a more personal project, shooting a feature-length documentary on the iconic composer Philip Glass, Glass: A Portrait of Philip in Twelve Parts. This film premiered at the 2007 Toronto International Film Festival. Glass told Hicks that he was not happy with the film, but for Hicks it was "a labour of love".

In 2009 he made The Boys Are Back, an Australian-UK co-production starring Clive Owen, based on the 2001 memoir by Simon Carr, The Boys Are Back in Town, and filmed in South Australia.

In 2014–15, Hicks made the documentary Highly Strung, about attempts by the Ngeringa Arts Centre to obtain four rare and valuable Guadagnini violins for the Australian String Quartet (ASQ). The film was produced by his wife Kerry Heysen, and opened the 2015 Adelaide Film Festival. The film portrays the relationships within the ASQ, Australia's only full-time quartet, the wealthy arts patron, Ulrike Klein (founder of Jurlique) who purchases the violins, and a family of musicians and dealers in New York City, David, Sean and Lauren Carpenter. He said of the film: "This was about the people. People who are obsessed with what they're doing. Whether they're musicians, investors, dealers... they're all obsessed". He called the Carpenters "the Kardashians of the music world".

== Other roles ==
Hicks is a member of the Academy of Motion Picture Arts and Sciences and the British Academy of Film and Television Arts.

In 2019 Hicks gave a training session in Singapore at MindChamps.

== Recognition, awards, and honours ==
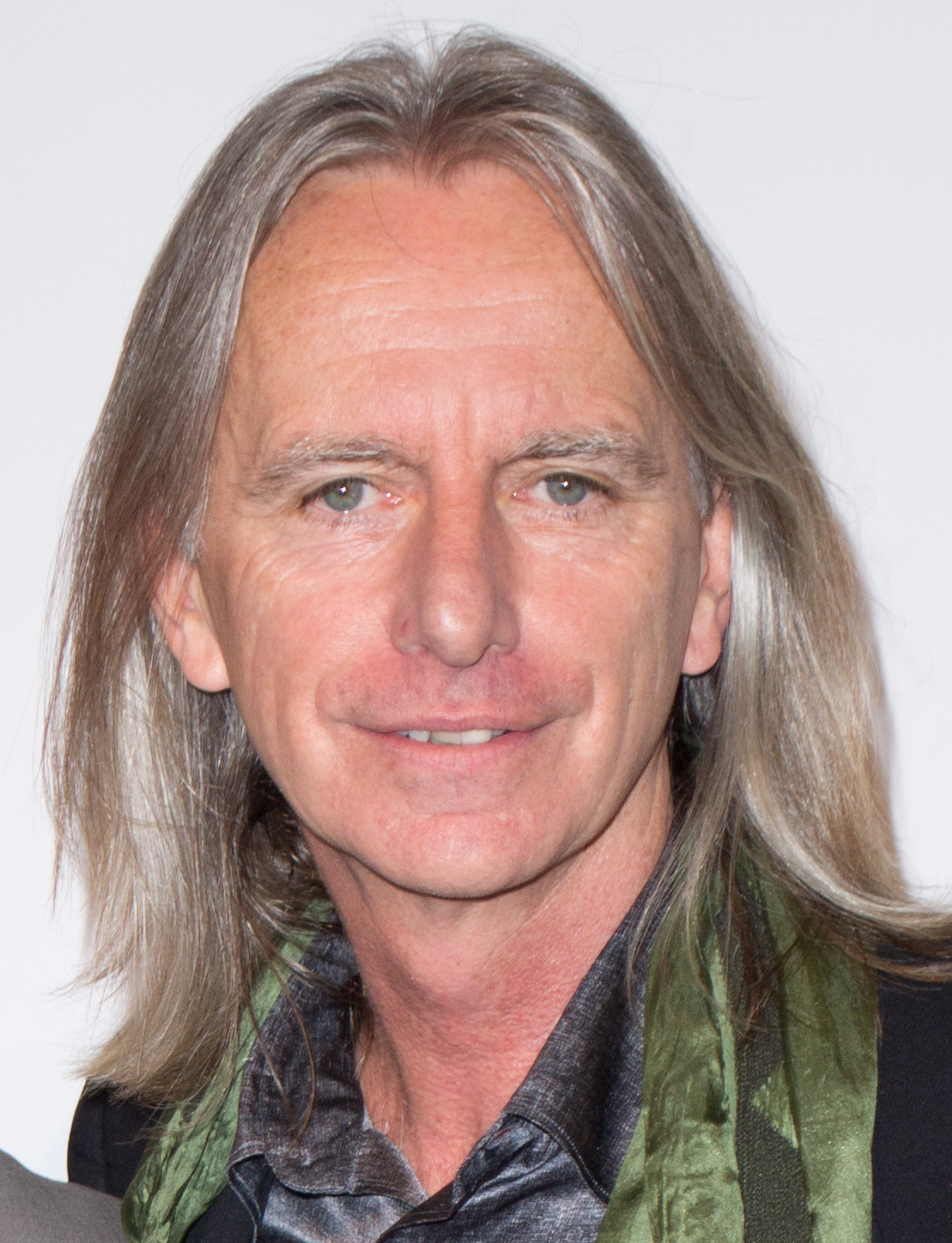
Hicks at the Australian premiere of The Lucky One

Hicks was awarded an honorary doctorate by his alma mater, Flinders University, in 1997.

He has had his portrait painted by David Bromley several times. The 1999 portrait was a finalist for the Archibald Prize.

Hicks was a finalist in 2008 for the Australian of the Year Awards.

In 2017, the Heysen Hicks Set Construction Studio was opened at the South Australian Film Corporation.

In November 2024, Hicks' 1982 documentary The Hall of Mirrors: A Festival, about the Adelaide Festival under the directorship of Jim Sharman, was screened at the Space Theatre in the Adelaide Festival Centre, followed by a conversation with the two men. The event was the biennial Wal Cherry Lecture, coinciding with the celebration of the 50th anniversary of Flinders Drama Centre celebration and named in honour of its founder, Wal Cherry.

The State Library of South Australia holds records of Hicks' life and work, including papers relating his work on many feature films and documentaries (original script drafts and development, correspondence, production files, publicity and marketing files, press cuttings, etc.), from 1970 to 2011. The accompanying catalogue description says: "His documentaries and feature films have helped inspire a new generation of Australian filmmakers and actors by telling unique, Australian stories which define us as a people".

=== Film and TV awards ===
Awards for Shine included:

- Jury Award for best film, Fort Lauderdale International Film Festival
- Toronto International Film Festival, best picture
- Citroen Audience Award, Rotterdam International Film Festival
- Directors' Week Award, Fantasporto, best director and best film
- Academy Award nominations for Best Director and Best Original Screenplay (with Jan Sardi)
- Golden Globe Award nomination, best director of a motion picture
- Writers Guild of America Screen Award nomination (with Jan Sardi)
- Writers Guild of America, best original screenplay written directly for the screen
- BAFTA Award nomination (with Jane Scott), best film
- David Lean Award for Direction nomination, (BAFTA)
- Nine nominations in the AFI Awards.

Other film/TV awards:

- 1993: Emmy Award, outstanding individual directorial achievement, for Submarines, Sharks of Steel: The Hidden Threat
- George Foster Peabody Broadcasting Award, for Discovery Channel documentaries

== Personal life ==
Hicks married film producer Kerry Heysen when they were both students. They have two sons, Scott and Jethro.

== Legacy ==
In 2024, Hicks donated his personal archive of film memorabilia and documentation to the State Library of South Australia, including such items as hand-drawn sketches of movie scenes, storyboards from completed films, and the glasses and costume worn by Geoffrey Rush in Shine. A large exhibition of the items is planned for 2026.

== Filmography ==
Film

Year	Title	Director	Writer	Producer
1974	The Wanderer	Yes	No	No
1975	Down the Wind	Yes	No	Yes
1982	Freedom	Yes	No	No
1988	Sebastian and the Sparrow	Yes	Yes	Yes
1996	Shine	Yes	Story	No
1999	Snow Falling on Cedars	Yes	Yes	No
2001	Hearts in Atlantis	Yes	No	No
2007	No Reservations	Yes	No	No
2009	The Boys Are Back	Yes	No	No
2012	The Lucky One	Yes	No	No
2016	Fallen	Yes	No	No

Documentary film

Year	Title	Director	Producer	Notes
1979	You Can't Always Tell	Yes	Yes	
1980	Bert Flugelman: Public Sculptor	Yes	No	
1980	Assertive Skills Training	Yes	No	
1981	No Going Back	Yes	No	
1982	The Hall of Mirrors: A Festival	Yes	No	
1983	One Last Chance	Yes	No	
1985	The INXS: Swing and Other Stories	Yes	No	
1985	Family Tree	Yes	No	
1993	Submarines: Sharks of Steel	Yes	No	Also writer
2004	I'm Only Looking – The Best of INXS	Yes	No	
2007	Glass: A Portrait of Philip in Twelve Parts	Yes	Yes	Also cinematographer

TV series

- Women Artists of Australia (1981)
- The Great Wall of Iron (1991)
- Finders Keepers (1991)

TV movies

Year	Title	Director	Writer	Producer
1986	Call Me Mr. Brown	Yes	Yes	No
1994	The Space Shuttle	Yes	Yes	No
1996	The Ultimate Athlete: Pushing the Limit	Yes	No	Yes
