= Teen Choice Award for Choice Movie – Drama =

Entertainment award category

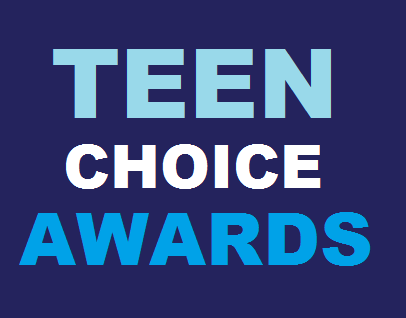
Teen Choice Awards logo

The following is a list of the Teen Choice Award winners and nominees for Choice Movie – Drama. Formerly, it had been combined with Choice Action Movie as the Choice Movie – Action/Drama award.

== Winners and nominees ==
=== 1990s ===
| Year | Winner | Nominees | Ref. |
|---|---|---|---|
| 1999 | Cruel Intentions | Enemy of the State; Ever After: A Cinderella Story; October Sky; Pleasantville; Star Wars: Episode I – The Phantom Menace; Stepmom; Varsity Blues | |

=== 2000s ===
| Year | Winner | Nominees | Ref. |
|---|---|---|---|
| 2000 | The Sixth Sense | American Beauty; The Beach; The Cider House Rules; Girl, Interrupted; Love & Basketball; Romeo Must Die; The Talented Mr. Ripley | |
| 2001† | Pearl Harbor | Almost Famous; A Knight's Tale; Lara Croft: Tomb Raider; The Mummy Returns; Remember the Titans; Save the Last Dance; Vertical Limit | |
| 2002† | Spider-Man | A Beautiful Mind; Black Hawk Down; Harry Potter and the Sorcerer's Stone; The Lord of the Rings: The Fellowship of the Ring; Men in Black II; Moulin Rouge!; Star Wars: Episode II – Attack of the Clones | |
| 2005 | The Notebook | The Aviator; Coach Carter; Finding Neverland; Friday Night Lights; Garden State; Ladder 49; The Sisterhood of the Traveling Pants | |
| 2006 | Harry Potter and the Goblet of Fire | Flightplan; Goal!; Pride & Prejudice; Take the Lead; Walk the Line | |
| 2007 | The Pursuit of Happyness | The Departed; The Guardian; Step Up; Stomp the Yard | |
| 2008 | Step Up 2: The Streets | 21; August Rush; Into the Wild; Stop-Loss | |
| 2009 | Twilight | Angels & Demons; The Curious Case of Benjamin Button; Obsessed; Slumdog Millionaire | |

† - Year awarded was under Choice Movie – Action/Drama.

=== 2010s ===
| Year | Winner | Nominees | Ref. |
|---|---|---|---|
| 2010 | The Blind Side | Dear John; The Last Song; Remember Me; The Runaways | |
| 2011 | Black Swan | Limitless; The Roommate; Soul Surfer; Water for Elephants | |
| 2012 | The Lucky One | Drive; The Help; The Vow; We Bought a Zoo | |
| 2013 | The Perks of Being a Wallflower | Argo; The Great Gatsby; The Impossible; Les Misérables | |
| 2014 | The Fault in Our Stars | American Hustle; Heaven Is for Real; Million Dollar Arm; Veronica Mars | |
| 2015 | If I Stay | The Age of Adaline; Fury; The Longest Ride; McFarland, USA; The Theory of Everything | |
| 2016 | Miracles from Heaven | 10 Cloverfield Lane; Creed; The Martian; Point Break; Straight Outta Compton | |
| 2017 | Everything, Everything | Before I Fall; The Edge of Seventeen; Gifted; Hidden Figures; The Shack | |
| 2018 | The Greatest Showman | Midnight Sun; Murder on the Orient Express; A Quiet Place; Truth or Dare; Wonder | |
| 2019 | After | Bohemian Rhapsody; Breakthrough; Five Feet Apart; The Hate U Give; To All the Boys I've Loved Before | |
