= Call Me Mr. Brown =

- Directed by: Scott Hicks
- Written by: Terry Jennings
- Produced by: Terry Jennings
- Starring: Chris Haywood; Vincent Ball; John Frawley
- Edited by: Andrew Prowse
- Production company: Kino Film Co.
- Release date: 1986
- Running time: 85 mins
- Country: Australia
- Language: English

Call Me Mr. Brown is a 1986 Australian movie based on the 1971 Qantas bomb hoax, written and directed by South Australian director Scott Hicks.

== Plot ==
In the true story of Australia's 'Great Plane Robbery', petty criminal Peter Marcari, using the pseudonym 'Mr Brown', extorts $500,000 from Australia's national airline Qantas, by threatening to blow up Flight 755 from Sydney to Hong Kong on 26 May 1971. After making a clean getaway, an international manhunt begins.

== Cast ==
- Chris Haywood as Peter Macari
- John Polson as Brian Day
- Vincent Ball as Captain Ritchie
- John Frawley as Captain Howson
- Bill Hunter as Detective Sergeant ‘Jim’ Jack McNeill
- Russell Kiefel as Ray Poynting
- Max Cullen as Fibreglass Factory Foreman
- John Noble as Geoff Fraser
- Ken Goodlet as Captain Selwyn
- Edwin Hodgeman as Bill Harding
- Leo Taylor as Major Morrison
- Lyn Collingwood as Woman Caller at Phone Box

=== Also in credits ===
- Brenton Whittle as Qantas Official 2
- Grant Piro as Mt Isa Miner
- Damon Herriman as Bowser Boy
- Stuart McCreery
- Huw Williams
- Robert Newman
- Damien Wiseman
- Michael Norman
- Patrick Frost
- Celine Griffin
- Tony Allison
- Adrian Shirley
- Henry Salter

== Release ==
Qantas actively tried to stop the film being made and despite failing to do so, Network 10, which had invested A$250,000 in the film, refrained from airing it. The film was eventually released on video in 1990.

== See also ==
- Cinema of Australia
