= Qantas House =

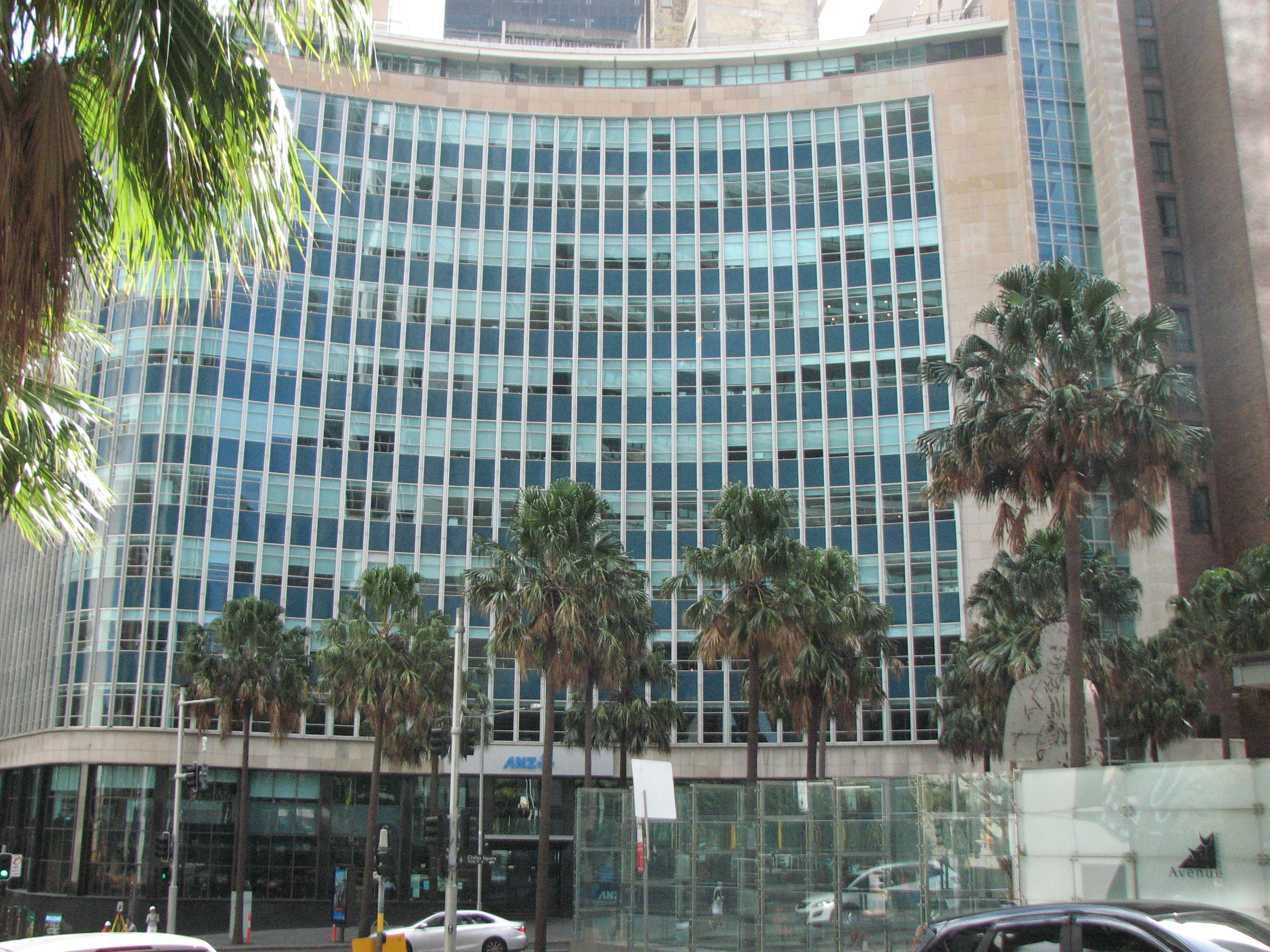
- Qantas House, 68-96 Hunter Street, Sydney, New South Wales

- Location within Sydney Location within Australia
- 33.8660°S 151.2107°E
- Location: 68–96 Hunter Street, Sydney, New South Wales, Australia

History
- Founded: 28 October 1957; 68 years ago
- Built: 1955–1957

Site notes
- Architect(s): Rudder, Littlemore & Rudder
- Architectural style: International

New South Wales Heritage Register
- Official name: Qantas House (No. 1 Chifley Square)
- Type: State heritage (built)
- Designated: 25 May 2001; 25 years ago
- Reference no.: 1512
- Type: Commercial Office/Building
- Category: Commercial
- Builders: Concrete Constructions Pty Ltd

Qantas House is an Australian heritage-listed office building at 68–96 Hunter Street, Sydney. It was designed by Rudder, Littlemore & Rudder and built from 1955 to 1957 by Concrete Constructions Pty Ltd. It is also known as No. 1 Chifley Square. The site was added to the New South Wales State Heritage Register on 25 May 2001.

== History ==
The airline Qantas saw a surge in activity in the years following World War II, and the company had achieved stature as a major world airline. Qantas House symbolised Australia's progress in aviation generally and the aeronautic future of Qantas Airways in particular. The construction of the building during this period reflected the increasing importance of international travel to the increasingly affluent middle class in Australia. The building was opened by Prime Minister Robert Menzies on 28 October 1957.

In its new company headquarters, Qantas wished to project a progressive image with the use of the latest imported curtain wall technology combined with Australian materials such as granite, marble and a variety of timbers. Qantas House was the first office building to use Australian black granite from Adelong and Bookharn green granite from the Yass area. Marble was sourced in the country town of Mudgee and the Wombeyan Caves area. Queensland maple was used extensively throughout the building and other timbers featured included walnut, mahogany and sycamore. As well as being chosen for aesthetic and patriotic reasons, there were economies to be achieved through the use of materials which could be found close at hand.

The desire to reflect a specifically Australian character was rare in office interiors of the 1950s. In keeping with the prevailing International style, the Australian theme in Qantas House was reflected more in the choice of materials than in the way they were used.

In her report Post World War II Multistoried Office Buildings in Australia (1945–1967), Jennifer Taylor states that the 'aesthetic ideas informing the design of multistoried office buildings in the '50s and '60s in Australia essentially belonged to architectural traditions developed in the Bauhaus, Germany in the late 1920s and early '30s and transported to America after the closure of that school by the Nazi government, where they blended with America's own traditions associated with multistoried building design. These ideas form the mainstream of architectural modernism, and are characterised by a value placed upon clarity, rationality, honesty, efficiency, functionality and technology. The external skin of the building was often the vehicle for a potent expression of such values. The glass curtain wall was prized as representing the complete release of the external fabric from its structural role'.

Buildings demonstrating the new curtain wall technology began to appear in Australian cities, particularly Sydney and Melbourne, from 1955. Qantas House (completed 1957), with its sweeping curtain wall attached to a reinforced concrete frame, is therefore an early example of the influence of this contemporary American technology and aesthetic in Australia. The building is significant in that it embraced this construction and aesthetic within the constraints of the 150' height limit which remained in place in Sydney until 1963.

As might be expected during a period of expansion, investment in office buildings had been growing during the late 1950s. In general, however, the buildings themselves were of low budget and limited dimension. They were usually infill structures of limited height, were built right to the building line and provided minimal pedestrian amenity. Context was generally seen as inconsequential and plazas associated with these buildings tended to divorce rather than unite the building with the city.

Within this context, the curved form of Qantas House, which addresses and shapes Chifley Square, is rare. Its form broke from the standard flat facade of most contemporary office buildings with its sweeping glass wall and dramatic cantilevered entry awning (now lost). Its curved fagade and more three-dimensional aesthetic distinguish it from the other buildings in the area.

Taylor also states that, at their most progressive, "the new office blocks principally were ree-standing or virtually so, and by 1957 Australia could boast designs as aesthetically and technologically advanced as any outside America, and not far behind developments there. An interesting hybrid of infill and freestanding solutions occurred in response to certain sites, notably corner locations, where innovative buildings appear to strive to break free of the constraints of the physical restrictions. The curving forms of the Qantas Building ... provide the most exuberant example."

Australia's affair with these early curtain walls was short-lived, and they reached their peak of development and prestige in the early 1960s.

Qantas House was judged the best new building in the British Commonwealth by the Royal Institute of British Architects in 1959, and was awarded the Bronze medal.

== Description ==
Qantas House is distinguished by its graceful, segmented, curved facade which consists of a 46m high, double glazed curtain wall of green glass with enamelled blue-green steel spandrel panels. It is located on the western side of Chifley Square which itself is located at the intersection of Elizabeth, Hunter and Phillip Streets in Sydney. In following the curve of Chifley Square, the building's plan respects the semi-circular form which was proposed for the northern side of the square in its original design of 1908. Qantas House is still a distinctive feature of Chifley Square and its curved form provides a welcome pedestrian area at the front of the building.

The building was designed in the post war International Style. The base, middle and top of the building are differentiated by changes in the facade treatment.

The base consists of a double height foyer which incorporates a mezzanine level. On the facade, the volume of this space is differentiated from the upper levels of the building by the use of dark green and black polished granite cladding and by the large, uninterrupted panels of glazing set in bronze frames. The eleven storeys of the middle section of the facade are characterised by the repetitive pattern of the smaller aluminium-framed curtain wall panels. The curtain wall is composed of vertical standard sections which include awning windows at their tops, central panels of fixed glazing and enamelled steel spandrel panels at their bases. At the northern end of the building is a full height sandstone faced wall on which a vertical "Qantas Airways" sign was originally located. The sandstone facing returns in a long band to form the top of the fagade composition, providing an exciting demarcation of the building against the sky. Above this band, a recessed roofline contains staff facilities and a rooftop recreation area.

The reinforced concrete structure of the building is relatively conventional. However, the planning is noteworthy in that the service cores are asymmetrically placed adjacent to the boundaries with the adjoining buildings. This allows for the inclusion of a light well at the rear of the building, ensuring the penetration of light deep into the interior. It also means that the curved line of the building against the sky is not interrupted by vertical projections of centrally located service cores.

The planning may also have resulted from a desire to maximise the available building envelope - the building appears to have reached the maximum floor space ratio and maximum height which were allowable under the planning codes at the time.

At its south eastern corner, the building joins Emil Sodersten's 1936 City Mutual Life Building in a carefully considered and sensitive manner. The polished granite base course below the foyer windows respects the line and material of the base of Sodersten's granite clad building. In addition, the proportions of the fenestration of Qantas House's curtain wall panels and the steel framed windows of the WL building are similar.

In successfully taking advantage of its corner site, Qantas House also forms an elegant termination to the long view northwards along Elizabeth Street. The exterior of the building is in near original condition, the only notable changes having been the loss of the original cantilevered entrance awning and original exterior signage and the formation of a new entrance to the lift lobby at the northern end of the building. Internally, the double height volume of the foyer is intact although the current recent fitout has resulted in some partitioning of the space. The original curtains to the office and foyer levels have been removed or replaced with vertical drapes. Originally, the building interior featured Australian grown timbers such as sycamore, mahogany and walnut. The exterior of the building generally retained its original appearance as of 2001, except that the original cantilevered entrance awning and external signage had been lost. The archaeological potential of the building is low.

=== Modifications and dates ===
- 1964/1965 – Alterations and additions. WC and bathroom to ground floor.
- 1966/1967 – Storeroom, fourth floor. Extensions to building.
- 1982/1983 – Refurbishment of building by Stephenson and Turner, Architects. A separate entrance to the office floors was formed at the building's northern end. The facade was repaired and restored.
- 1988/1989 – Alterations to ground floor and mezzanine.
- 1992 – Modification of ceiling, north fire stair and basement. Installation of revolving door. Entrance awning. The original sweeping cantilevered entrance awning has been replaced with the current unsympathetic awning.
- Signage – The original 'Qantas Airways' signage from the sandstone wall at the northern end of the building has been removed along with the neon signage from the rooftop over the building's northern service core.

== Heritage listing ==
Qantas House, No. 1 Chifley Square, Sydney, designed in 1950 by Felix Tavener of Rudder Littlemore & Rudder, Architects and completed in 1957 represents the highest standard of architectural response to its urban setting and client needs through its form, composition and construction. A variant of the Post-War International style of architecture, Qantas House represents transitional aspects of "moderate" 1930s European modernism, combined with the latest in post-war curtain wall technologies and materials and is the best design response to its setting in Australia from this period. Although altered internally, its external facade remains largely intact. The graceful double-curved facade is coherently ordered and its shape reflects and visually reinforces the implementation of a long-planned extension to Elizabeth Street. It became the inspiration for the eventual completion of the ironically named, but no less significant, Chifley Square, modelled on a town planned scheme of some eighty years before. Qantas House is a key defining element in this important, planned, urban space; it provides an appropriate visual termination to important vistas and it visually links to adjoining important buildings and streets.

Historically significant as the first planned world headquarters for Qantas Empire Airways, at the time Australia's only, and Government-owned, international airline, the building, and in particular the aerofoil-shaped aluminium mullions of its curtain wall, gives form to Qantas' forward looking and expansive image at a time when air travel was taking off. Qantas Airways remained as its sole occupant for twenty-five years. The building is highly regarded by the people of Sydney for its inherent aesthetic qualities and its association with Qantas, an Australian corporate icon. Qantas House is a fine example in the Australian context of intact, post-war, multi-storeyed office buildings from the first phase in the 1950s, and is from the small group in Sydney of this group designed prior to the amendments to the Heights of Buildings Act in 1957 that heralded the subsequent "high-rise" phase. It has particular rarity within Australia for its unique shape, the outstanding quality of its curtain wall facade and its contribution to its urban setting. As such, it is considered to have heritage significance at a national level. A well known and much loved city landmark, Qantas House is an icon of its time; a quintessential Sydney building that represents a brave future and a strong sense of history and of place.

Qantas House was listed on the New South Wales State Heritage Register on 25 May 2001 having satisfied the following criteria.

The place is important in demonstrating the course, or pattern, of cultural or natural history in New South Wales.

Qantas House is an important landmark in the development of the modern office building in Australia. Significant for its use of early curtain wall technology and as one of the last multi-storey buildings designed prior to amendments to the Heights of Buildings Act in 1957 in NSW, it is from the first phase of curtain wall buildings that provided a transition to the mature high-rise buildings of the 1960s. Qantas House is significant as the first purpose-built world headquarters office building for Qantas Empire Airways, at that time Australia's only, and Government-owned, international airline. It is important evidence of the rapid post-War growth in Qantas Empire Airways' international operations and in air travel generally. Alterations to Qantas House to allow for the construction by Qantas of the adjacent Wentworth Hotel are important evidence of changes in the nature of air travel and the growth of international tourism in Australia. Qantas House is a statement of the confidence and progressive spirit which was characteristic of Australia during the 1950s. The international status and progressive nature of Qantas' operations when combined with the exuberant form and imagery, the use of innovative and local materials, and innovative techniques and services in the building itself, provides an exemplar of the positive, forward-looking aspects of Australian society during this period. The construction of Qantas House marked the partial implementation of a significant town planning scheme for the betterment of Sydney and provided the pattern for the eventual completion of Chifley Square as a significant urban space some eighty years after it was first envisaged. The fulfilment of this town planning vision provides important evidence of the complex nature of such activity and the interaction between various levels of Government, professionals and land owners. Qantas House shows the continuity of use from the time of construction to the present as a commercial office building and the continuous use of the ground floor for a publicly accessible use associated with travel. It provides evidence of the period during which air travel originated at city terminals for departure to Sydney Airport. It also provides evidence of the nature of changes in the nature of office use and fitout since the time of construction, including those resulting from the change from a single owner occupier to multiple tenancies on its upper levels.

The place has a strong or special association with a person, or group of persons, of importance of cultural or natural history of New South Wales's history.

Qantas House has a strong association with Qantas Airways, a prominent Australian company of international renown. Qantas Empire Airways constructed the building as its first purpose-designed world headquarters, as an identifiable icon for its modern image, and was its sole occupant for twenty-five years. This association is continued through its lease of the ground and mezzanine floors and naming rights to the building. Qantas House is important for its public use associations with air travellers since its time of construction, as a booking and information venue for Qantas and other airlines that occupied the ground floor including TAA and Australian Airlines. Qantas House was designed by the noted architectural firm Rudder Littlemore & Rudder, with Felix Tavener as the design architect, and is arguably their most significant building achievement.

The State Heritage Register inclusion criteria satisfied is associated with a significant event, person or groups of persons.

The place is important in demonstrating aesthetic characteristics and/or a high degree of creative or technical achievement in New South Wales.

Qantas House is a masterpiece of architectural form, composition and construction. It represents the highest standards of architectural design response its urban setting and its client's needs. Its unique graceful double curved from strikes a chord with the public and professionals alike. The composition of its façade elements is coherently ordered, as is its curtain wall construction featuring aerofoil-shaped mullions, symbolically linking building and client, lustrous teal coloured spandrels and green-tinted glazing. Qantas House is an important early and innovative example of post-War multi-storeyed office building in Australia. It was one of the first uses of curtain-walled technology in Australia and was designed as a showcase for Australian materials. It also featured an innovative internal fitout and use of air conditioning services. It was critically acclaimed in the architectural press at the time and it was the recipient of the 1959 Royal Institute of British Architects Bronze Medal. Qantas House is significant as a variation within the Post-War International style of architecture, representing some aspects of transition from interwar European modernism. Characteristics of earlier styles can be identified in both the building (a humanist/organic form, a traditional composition and symbolic use of elemental forms) and in the influences identified by its designer, while its materials, such as aluminium, and its curtain wall construction arrived as post-War construction technologies. As a landmark building in such a prominent location, Qantas House demonstrates an excellent urban design response. Its relationship with Chifley Square, which it helps to define, reflects earlier twentieth-century schemes for the space and has itself been respected by the recent developments around this important urban space. The generous footpath space n front of Qantas House provides an appropriate forecourt to the public ground-floor booking hall. Qantas House was designed as and forms an aesthetically distinctive termination of the northern view along Elizabeth Street, while at the same time the building leads the eye around the Chifley Square space and onto the extension of Elizabeth Street as Philip Street. The external form of Qantas House retains its integrity with only minor alteration, and its key internal ground-floor/mezzanine space is retained along with its key internal circulation spaces. Although much of the building's internal fabric has been altered, the external fabric remains largely intact.

The place has a strong or special association with a particular community or cultural group in New South Wales for social, cultural or spiritual reasons.

It is likely that Qantas House is viewed as culturally significant within the community of NSW generally, not just for its association with Qantas, an Australian corporate icon, but also for its readily appreciated aesthetic and townscape qualities. This level of esteem was evident at the time of construction and there is evidence, through media coverage in recent years when it was perceived as being under threat, that it remains. Qantas House is also held in a high level of esteem by the architectural profession and other conservation groups in NSW. The building is included on the Royal Australian Institute of Architects Register of Twentieth Century Buildings of Significance and they recently nominated the building for inclusion on the State Heritage Register. Qantas House is likely to have a strong association for current and former employees of Qantas Airways because of its former headquarters role for twenty-five years and its current role as the Qantas city-based booking office.

The place has potential to yield information that will contribute to an understanding of the cultural or natural history of New South Wales.

Although the building interior has been considerably altered, it is likely that some internet fabric of the interior would be able to reveal further information about spatial arrangements, materials and finishes from the original construction period. Qantas House has the potential to yield important information on aspects of mid-twentieth-century architectural history and other technical aspects of its construction, such as the detail of the internal fitout, the provision of air conditioning services, the first phases of curtain wall construction and office functional arrangements in the 1950s and 1960s. Qantas House is an important reference site for its early use of high-quality, curtain-walled technology and as a showcase for Australian building materials, including the granite and sandstone facing of the façade. Because of the depth of excavation for the construction of the basement levels for Qantas House across most of the site, there is little potential for archaeological remains that predate the existing building to remain intact. There is some potential for intact subsurface deposits to survive in the northwestern corner of the site (currently lightwell) as the amount of disturbance that has occurred in these areas is uncertain. The northwestern corner of the site may contain the northern extension of an early brick-barrel drain, dating to the 1820s. (This drain previously ran diagonally across the site but was removed during the construction of Qantas House and replaced by a modern ceramic drainpipe. It is also likely to adjoin the southeastern boundary of the site). Although not part of the Qantas House site itself, the area adjoining the front of Qantas House (Philip Street and Chifley Square) has high potential to contain intact subsurface deposits related to the previous street alignment and associated development.

The place possesses uncommon, rare or endangered aspects of the cultural or natural history of New South Wales.

Qantas House is a rare and outstanding example of architectural design of the highest quality in the Australian context from the first phase of post-War, multi-storey commercial building construction in Australia in the period up to 1960. Qantas House is a unique example in the Australian context of a curved, curtain wall building of this type and period. The facade of Qantas House retains its original, aluminium-framed, curtain wall construction, with distinctive aerofoil-shaped mullions. This early technology is becoming increasingly rare with continual upgrading of buildings and the Qantas House facade is an excellent example of this type. Qantas House is one of the five heritage listed "non-high-rise" multi-storeyed buildings within Sydney (four in the city of Sydney and one in North Sydney) to remain that were constructed prior to 1960. Qantas House and the MLC building in North Sydney represent the finest examples from this period, and both represent distinctive and different forms of Post-War International style architecture. Qantas House is part of a small group of multi-storey buildings constructed by the last generation of Post-War corporate clients whose buildings were specifically designed to reflect that corporation's public image. Qantas House is a rare example of Post-War International Style architecture with an expressionist form. Qantas House illustrates a high quality consideration for its context and for urban design, forming a key element in the Chifley Square urban area that was part of this long-standing town planning scheme for the betterment of this area of Sydney that dated to the early twentieth century.

The place is important in demonstrating the principal characteristics of a class of cultural or natural places/environments in New South Wales.

Qantas House is representative of the intact Post-War International style, multi-storeyed office buildings from the 1950s. It is one of only a handful of similar intact buildings in Sydney from that period and only a small numbering Australia. Qantas House is a fine example of early curtain-walled building technology in Australia, with an unconventional curved design. Qantas House is one of the small group of post-War, multi-storeyed office buildings remaining intact in NSW whose design preceded the amendments to the Heights of Buildings Act in 1957. Qantas House is representative of the group of commercial buildings in Sydney associated with travel and is representative of the group of buildings with ground-floor public booking hall spaces. Qantas House is a good example of the work of the architectural firm Rudder Littlemore and Rudder. Qantas House is associated with the group of planned and implemented proposals for the betterment of Sydney's streets.

== See also ==
- Australian non-residential architectural styles
