= Glass: A Portrait of Philip in Twelve Parts =

2007 film by Scott Hicks

- Theatrical release poster
- Directed by: Scott Hicks
- Written by: Scott Hicks
- Produced by: Scott Hicks Susanne Preissler
- Starring: JoAnne Akalaitis; Woody Allen
- Cinematography: Scott Hicks
- Edited by: Stephen Jess
- Music by: Philip Glass
- Production companies: Independent Media; Kino Films; Mandalay Motion Pictures
- Distributed by: Koch Lorber Films
- Release date: September 7, 2007 (Toronto International Film Festival)
- Running time: 119 minutes
- Countries: Australia; United States
- Language: English
- Box office: $32,090

Glass: A Portrait of Philip in Twelve Parts is a 2007 documentary on the life of American composer Philip Glass directed by Scott Hicks. The film was nominated for Emmy Awards and AFI Award

== Cast ==
All the persons below play their own life roles.

- JoAnne Akalaitis
- Woody Allen
- Holly Critchlow
- Philip Glass
- Errol Morris
- Nico Muhly
- Godfrey Reggio
- Dennis Russell Davies
- Martin Scorsese
- Ravi Shankar

== Reception ==
It holds an 84% rating on Rotten Tomatoes, and a rating score of 55 out of 100 on Metacritic.

== Awards and nominations ==
Year	Award	Category	Recipient(s)	Result
2009	AFI Award	Best Sound in a Documentary	Stephen R. Smith, Peter D. Smith, Tom Heuzenroeder, Adrian Medhurst	Nominated
2009	Emmy Award	Outstanding Sound Editing for Nonfiction Programming (Single or Multi-Camera)	Stephen R. Smith (sound supervisor), Peter D. Smith (dialogue editor/music editor), Tom Heuzenroeder (sound effects editor), Adrian Medhurst (sound effects editor), (PBS).	Nominated
