= The Lucky One (film) =

- Theatrical release poster
- Directed by: Scott Hicks
- Screenplay by: Will Fetters
- Based on: The Lucky One by Nicholas Sparks
- Produced by: Denise Di Novi; Kevin McCormick
- Starring: Zac Efron; Taylor Schilling; Jay R. Ferguson; Blythe Danner
- Cinematography: Alar Kivilo
- Edited by: Scott Gray
- Music by: Mark Isham
- Production companies: Village Roadshow Pictures; Di Novi Pictures
- Distributed by: Warner Bros. Pictures
- Release date: April 20, 2012
- Running time: 100 minutes
- Country: United States
- Language: English
- Budget: $25 million
- Box office: $99.4 million

The Lucky One is a 2012 American romantic drama film directed by Scott Hicks and released in April 2012. It is an adaptation of Nicholas Sparks’ 2008 novel.

The film stars Zac Efron as Logan Thibault, a US Marine who finds a photograph of a young woman while serving in Iraq, carries it around as a good luck charm, and later tracks down the woman, with whom he begins a relationship.

The film received negative reviews, and grossed $99.4 million.

== Plot ==
Logan Thibault, a US Marine serving in Iraq, witnesses a Marine called "Aces" die attempting to aid one of his men during an ambush. The following morning, he finds a picture of a young woman on the ground just before a mortar attack destroys where he had been sitting, killing many around him. Unsuccessful at finding the photo's owner, he keeps it. Logan's squad-mate declares the woman in the picture his "guardian angel," just before an explosion destroys their Humvee.

Logan returns to Colorado to live with his sister's family, who have been looking after his dog Zeus. Suffering from PTSD and survivor guilt, he decides it is best to leave and departs to search for the woman in the photo. Logan and Zeus walk to Louisiana, where a lighthouse in the photo has provided a clue. He shows the photo around town and a local resident tells him that the woman used to be married to his friend, a local deputy sheriff.

Logan finds the woman, Beth Green, but has difficulty explaining why he is there. She assumes he wants a job, and her grandmother, Ellie, ends up hiring him. At first, Beth is irritated by Logan's presence, but she begins to warm to him due to his calm demeanor, willingness to work, and competence in repairing machinery. Logan develops a supportive relationship with Beth's son Ben, who is without a positive male influence since the death of Beth's brother Drake. Beth's former husband, Sheriff's Deputy Keith Clayton—the son of the town's judge—is immediately suspicious of Logan. He is brusque and overbearing with the former Marine. He discourages his son Ben from playing the violin around him, which leads the boy to practice in his tree house.

On the anniversary of Drake's death, Beth becomes distraught and Logan calms her down. Keith tries to stop the budding relationship between Beth and Logan, but she stands up to him, showing that she is no longer intimidated by him.

Discovering that Logan was asking about Beth when he first arrived in town, Keith steals the photo, making her believe that Logan has been stalking her. Her trust destroyed, she is distraught and sends Logan away. Ellie tries to soften Beth, explaining it isn't Logan's fault he survived and Drake did not.

An intoxicated Keith sees Logan walking with his dog and angrily confronts him, drawing his gun while people on the street begin to panic and run. Logan disarms him, turning the weapon over to another officer. He then heads home to pack, finding a photo of Beth's brother Drake inside a book Ben had given him. The tattoo on Drake's forearm says "Aces" and he realizes that Drake was the sergeant from the night raid. Logan returns to Beth's to tell her what he knows of how Drake died.

At Judge Clayton's, Keith is shocked and embarrassed over what he did, although his father assures him it will all blow over before the election. Keith walks out into a gathering storm, leaving his badge behind, pleading to Beth to reconcile. When she gently but firmly refuses, he again threatens to take Ben away.

Ben overhears and runs out into the storm, followed by Keith and Beth, just as Logan arrives. Ellie urges Logan to follow. Ben is going to the treehouse, but the rope suspension bridge gives way and he falls into the river along with his father, just as Beth and Logan arrive. Keith, caught in the rope of the bridge, calls to Logan who grabs Ben and hands him to Beth. Before Logan can return for Keith, the treehouse falls on him and he is swept away in the raging river to his death.

Back home, Beth thanks Logan for saving her son. He explains that Drake died saving one of his own men. Then Logan starts to leave, but Beth runs after him and says that he belongs with them.

A year passes, finding Logan, Beth, Ben, and Zeus celebrating Ben's 9th birthday together.

== Cast ==
- Zac Efron as Logan Thibault
- Taylor Schilling as Elizabeth "Beth" Green
- Blythe Danner as Ellie
- Jay R. Ferguson as Keith Clayton
- Riley Thomas Stewart as Benjamin "Ben" Clayton
- Adam LeFevre as Judge Clayton
- Joe Chrest as Deputy Moore
- Ann McKenzie as Charlotte Clayton
- Kendal Tuttle as Drake "Aces" Green
- Robert Terrell Hayes as Victor
- Russ Comegys as Roger Lyle
- Sharon Morris as Principal Miller

== Reception ==
=== Box office ===
The Lucky One has grossed $60,457,138 in North America and $38,900,000 in other territories for a worldwide total of $99,357,138.

In its opening weekend, the film grossed $22,518,358, finishing second at the box office behind Think Like a Man ($33,636,303).

=== Critical reception ===
The Lucky One received mostly negative reviews from critics. On Rotten Tomatoes, the film holds a "negative" rating of 20%, based on 148 reviews and an average rating of 4.3/10, with the critical consensus saying, "While it provides the requisite amount of escapist melodrama, The Lucky One ultimately relies on too many schmaltzy clichés to appeal to anyone not already familiar with the Nicholas Sparks formula". On Metacritic it has a score of 39 out of 100 based on 35 reviews, indicating "generally unfavorable reviews". Audiences surveyed by CinemaScore gave the film an average grade of "B+" on an A+ to F scale.

=== Awards ===
Award	Category	Recipient(s)	Result
Golden Trailer Awards	Best Romance	Find You	Nominated
Golden Trailer Awards	Best Romance Poster	One Sheet	Won
Golden Trailer Awards	Best Romance TV Spot	Reveal	Nominated
Teen Choice Awards	Choice Movie Actor: Drama	Zac Efron	Won
Teen Choice Awards	Choice Movie Actor: Romance	Zac Efron	Won
Teen Choice Awards	Choice Movie Actress: Romance	Taylor Schilling	Nominated
Teen Choice Awards	Choice Movie: Drama	The Lucky One	Won
Teen Choice Awards	Choice Movie: Liplock	Zac Efron & Taylor Schilling	Nominated
Teen Choice Awards	Choice Movie: Romance	The Lucky One	Nominated
People's Choice Awards	Favorite Dramatic Movie	The Lucky One	Nominated
People's Choice Awards	Favorite Dramatic Movie Actor	Zac Efron	Won
Young Artist Awards	Best Performance in a Feature Film – Leading Young Actor	Riley Thomas Stewart	Nominated

== Home media ==
The Lucky One was released on DVD and Blu-ray on August 28, 2012, and grossed $31.6 million in home media sales.
