= The Lucky One (novel) =

Novel by Nicholas Sparks

- First edition
- Author: Nicholas Sparks
- Language: English
- Genre: Romance; Drama; War
- Publisher: Grand Central Publishing
- Publication date: 2008
- Publication place: United States
- Media type: Print (hardcover)
- Pages: 386 pp
- ISBN: 0-446-57993-9
- OCLC: 233573959
- Dewey Decimal: 813/.54 22
- LC Class: PS3569.P363 L83 2008
- Preceded by: The Choice

The Lucky One is a 2008 romance novel by American writer Nicholas Sparks. U.S. Marine Logan Thibault finds a photograph of a smiling young woman half-buried in the dirt during his first deployment in the Iraq War. The photograph brings him luck, and, once home, he sets out to find the woman in the photo.

The novel follows from three different character perspectives: Keith Clayton, Elizabeth Green, and Logan Thibault.

The novel was adapted into a 2012 film starring Zac Efron and Taylor Schilling.

== Plot summary ==
The book starts from Keith Clayton's perspective. Keith is a local police officer. He is at a location where local college students go for nude swimming. He is carrying a camera he borrowed from the Police Department and is taking pictures of three female college students. One of them leaves the beach and comes upon Keith who is supposed to be on duty. He hides the camera and talks with the girls about their breaking the law by nude bathing. He lets them go. He comes across a man whom Keith describes as looking like a hippie walking down a logging road by the beach with a dog. It is Logan Thibault and his dog, Zeus. Keith is concerned Logan saw everything that had happened and tries to find a way to take Logan in. However, after running a background check on Logan and Logan refusing to let him search his bags he lets Logan go. He asks Logan where he is going and states he is heading to Arden. Keith goes back to find the camera he hid, but it is gone and the tires on his squad car are slashed. Keith becomes concerned as his father is the local Sheriff and his grandfather is a local judge.

When the story changes to Logan's perspective, he is in the car with the three college girls who picked him up when he indicated he wanted to hitch a ride. He gives the camera (from which he removed the memory disk) to the college girls. The story also back tracks to Logan witnessing Keith taking the pictures and Logan taking the camera, destroying the disk, and slashing the tires of Keith's cruiser. The story then goes back further into Logan's life as he reflects on his walking all the way from Colorado and even further back as to why he decided to join the Marines. It is explained how Logan began to play Poker while tensions were building in the Middle East and this was his outlet. He lost all of his money while doing this and eventually gave up joining in on the games. It is then mentioned that Logan liked to go for early morning runs while in the Middle East and one day he came upon a picture half buried in the sand. It turns out to be a picture of Beth who is wearing a shirt that says Lucky Lady. His luck then begins to change. It is first noticed when his friend in his squad, Victor, encourages him to join in a poker game that night. Victor also believes in omens and superstitions and is the one who slowly convinces Logan the picture and the girl in the picture are powerful to Logan and the picture may have a deeper meaning in Logan's life.

Elizabeth (Beth) is next introduced in the story. It starts at a birthday party her son, Ben, is attending. It comes up that Beth's grandmother, Nana, recently had a stroke and Beth has been helping her run the dog kennel/obedience school Nana owns. It is also mentioned that Nana raised Beth, because Beth's parents died in a car accident when Beth was 3 years old. Beth is also a teacher at a local school. It slowly becomes known that Keith Clayton is the ex-husband of Beth, and the father of Ben. Beth expresses her frustration about Keith's disappointment in Ben as Ben is not as athletically inclined as other boys of his age. It becomes apparent that Ben does not care for his father much and does not like spending every other weekend with Keith.

The story goes back to Logan and the beginning of his experience in the Middle East is mentioned. A story is told about how the two comrades in his fire team are killed by a RPG and Logan survives. Logan is staying at a local motel and first decides to find the fairgrounds where the picture he had of Beth was taken. He finds the exact location where the picture was taken and knows he is in the right place. He determines he is going to go to a pool hall/bar to ask the locals if anyone knows the girl in the picture.

Next, Keith reminisces about his day and having to explain the slashed tires to his father. It comes to light that his dad and grandfather are well known in the town and Keith is stuck between keeping out of trouble and his family being able to get him out of trouble due to their status in town. Keith also explains his dislike for his son's (in Keith's eyes) weaknesses. Instead of wanting to be with Ben, Keith wants to be out looking for Logan to make him pay for what he did. Keith receives a phone call from a co-worker, Tony, who says a stranger has a picture of Beth at a local pool hall and was asking about her. Keith asks if the guy looks like what Logan had looked like earlier, but the co-worker says that is not the description of the man at the pool hall. Keith is disappointed and decides to do nothing about man with the picture.

Logan's version of the bar/pool hall encounter is described and he learns Beth's full name. The next day Logan goes to the dog kennel and meets Beth for the first time. He applies for a position at the kennel and Beth becomes suspicious due to the half told story Logan tells her. (He leaves the part out about the picture as the reason why he came to Hampton). Beth is skeptical and decides to have Nana talk with Logan. Nana decides to hire Logan, but admits she feels he isn't telling the whole truth about being in Hampton. Once hired, Logan finds a place to rent in town and begins working at the kennel. Over the next few weeks Logan (and Zeus) becomes closer with Nana, Beth and Ben.

Nana decides to go on a trip to visit her sister in Greensboro, leaving Beth and Logan to tend to the kennel. Beth and Logan get to know each other better, and this is one of the weekends when Ben spends time with his father. Logan and Beth make ice cream on the Saturday night Ben is gone when Keith brings him back to Beth. Ben has a bruise on his face and his glasses are broken. Keith tells Ben to tell Beth it wasn't his fault, but it's apparent Keith threw a baseball too hard and it hit Ben in the face. Keith does not notice Logan initially, but when he does he demands to know what Logan is doing there. Zeus becomes defensive and Logan tells Keith to leave. Keith does, but is upset about the incident, because he does not like being challenged and forced to back down. He also upset to have found out that Logan had never left town and is concerned Logan may still have the camera's memory disk.

Beth and Logan go on a date and Logan opens up about Victor and Logan's boating trip in Minnesota. Logan informs Beth that Victor died when another boat hit their boat. Logan and Beth continue to date, and eventually Keith breaks into Logan's home to see if he could find the photo disk. Logan suggests to Beth that Keith has been the reason why none of her relationships have lasted and tells her about the break-in he had had in his home. Nana implies she agrees with Logan. Beth goes to a former boyfriend's home and he weakly admits Keith may have been involved in his breaking up with her. Beth (politely) confronts Keith about this. Keith during this conversation tries to convince Beth that she knows nothing about Logan and this could dangerous. Keith thinks he has begun to convince Beth and is in high spirits. However, Logan did research on Keith's family and meets Keith at Keith's home. Logan tells Keith he knows it was Keith who broke into his home and bluffs that he has a video recording of the break in. Logan said he would take the information to Keith's family if Keith did not stay out of Beth's business. Keith realizes he no longer has the upper hand and begins to drink heavily.

Later, there is a storm that comes through Hampton and it rains for days/weeks and the area begins to flood. Ben convinces Logan to go to his tree house and Logan realizes it is no longer safe because of the flooding. They still enter the tree house and Logan gives Ben the picture because he feels it will keep Ben safe. Logan mentions his friend Victor's belief in the luck of the photo. Logan also plays the piano in church for Nana and the town begins to admire Logan, and even Keith's grandfather praises Ben, deepening Keith's hatred of Logan.

Tony, the co-worker who called Keith from the pool hall when Logan first arrived in town, goes to Keith's house and informs Keith that Logan was the guy who had had the picture of Beth which Keith had ignored. Keith goes to the school where Beth works and convinces Beth that Logan is a stalker. Beth doesn't necessarily believe Keith at the time and confronts Logan who admits to having the photo. Beth becomes extremely upset and demands the picture. Logan informs Beth that he had given it to Ben.

Later, Beth asks Ben for the photo and asks him to tell her everything Logan had said when Logan had given it to Ben. Beth realizes Logan had been honest about how he felt the photo was a good luck charm. Beth goes to Logan's home and he tells her everything. He also mentions the tree house being very unsafe to Beth. Keith spies on Beth and Logan and is enraged. When Beth leaves Logan's house Keith follows her to her home. Keith tells her he was going to take her to court to obtain full custody of Ben if she doesn't follow his rules. He wants her to stop seeing Logan and date him (Keith) again. Ben overhears Keith threatening to take full custody, and tells Keith he doesn't want to live with him. Ben runs away to his tree house. Logan had seen the extra set of tire tracks and realizes Keith had been around when Beth was at his house. Logan runs to Beth's house.

Beth finally realizes Ben had run to the tree house and both Keith and Beth struggle to get to the tree house through the flooding and rain. When they arrive at the tree house it has partially collapsed and Ben was in the creek running under the tree house clinging to the rope bridge. Keith tries to go to the tree house but falls through the rotten wood and breaks his ribs and clings to rope bridge as well. Beth broke her foot on the way to the tree house and only able to watch everything unfold. Logan and Zeus arrive and try to help, as well. Logan ends up closer to Keith and Keith clings to Logan dragging him under when the whole tree house collapses and Logan and Keith disappear into the abyss. Zeus saves Ben.

In the epilogue it becomes apparent that Keith died and Logan survives. Ben continues to carry the photo around for good luck.

== Author's comments ==
The book deals with the themes of starcrossed fate and destiny. Despite the allusions to such themes made in the novel, Sparks admitted that he does not necessarily believe in either. He adds, however, that he is "a big believer in the fact that people have the ability to influence the future in a way that seems coincidental and when that happens, the feeling of fate or destiny is amplified. [...] In the end, when writing The Lucky One, I wanted to explore the subject of fate or destiny, but in a way that reflected the reality of the world."
